= List of North Texas Mean Green football seasons =

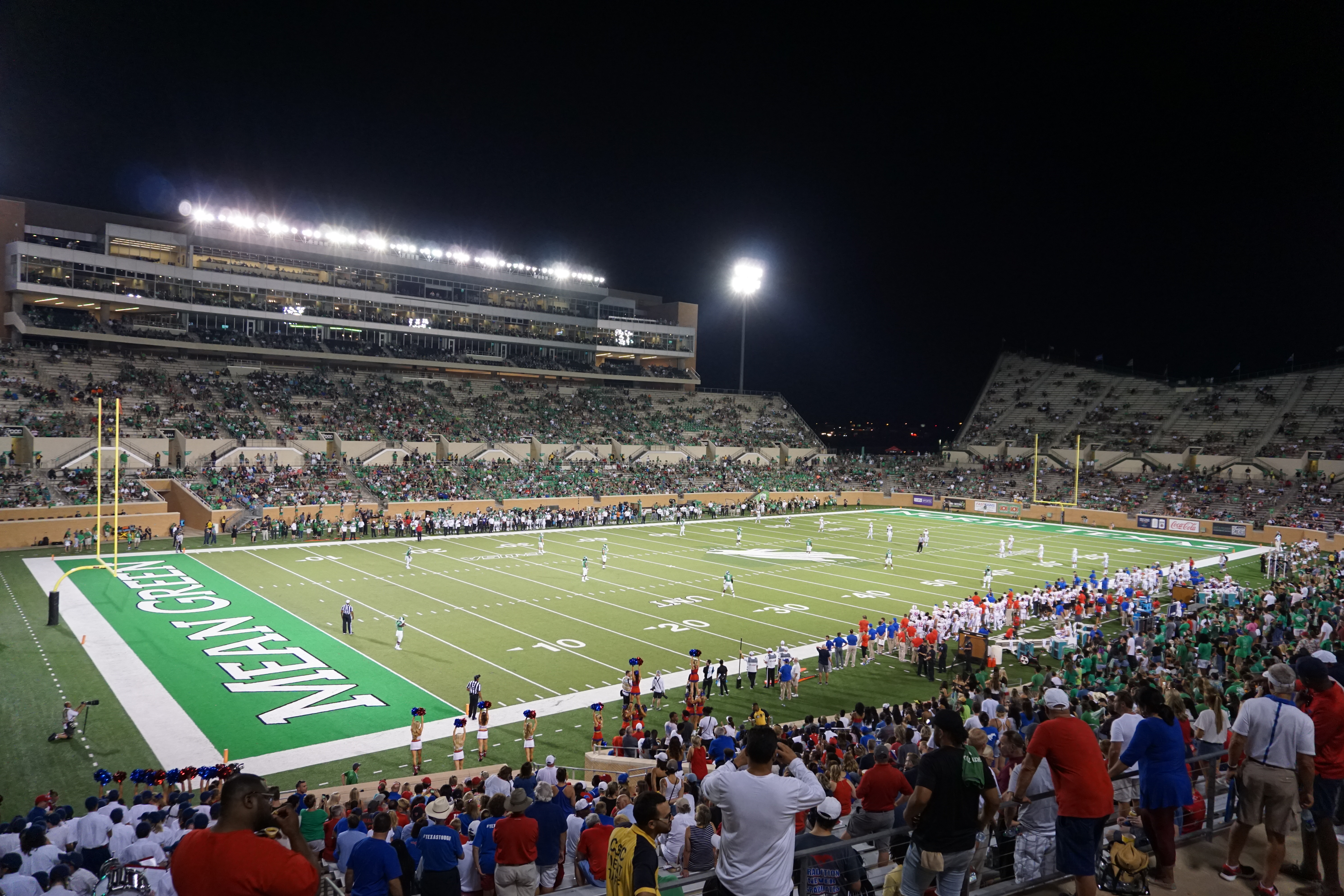
North Texas defeated SMU 46–23 at Apogee Stadium to open their 2018 season.

The North Texas Mean Green football team competes as part of the National Collegiate Athletic Association (NCAA) Division I Football Bowl Subdivision (FBS), representing North Texas University as part of the Conference USA (C-USA). North Texas left C-USA and joined the American Athletic Conference for the 2023 season.

The Mean Green have played 109 seasons of football, compiling a record of 548–548–33 (.500) and winning 26 conference championships (1 in the Texas Intercollegiate Athletic Association, 8 in the Lone Star Conference, 5 in the Gulf Coast Conference, 6 in the Missouri Valley Conference, 2 in the Southland Conference, and 4 in the Sun Belt Conference). The Mean Green appeared in 15 bowl games, and they appeared in the FCS playoffs four times.

North Texas fielded their first team in 1913 under coach J. W. Pender. After competing as an independent during their early years, the then named Eagles joined the Texas Intercollegiate Athletic Association (TIAA) in 1922, and were TIAA champions in 1931. Next as a member of the Lone Star Conference from 1932 to 1948, the Eagles captured eight championships. In 1946, North Texas defeated Pacific (CA) in the Optimist Bowl for their first all-time bowl victory. The Eagles' would win another 11 combined conference championships as members of the Gulf Coast Conference and the Missouri Valley Conference from 1949 to 1974.

After a brief stint as an I-A Independent from 1975 to 1981, the Mean Green participated in their first NCAA Division I-AA postseason in 1983 after they won the Southland Conference championship, when they lost at Nevada. North Texas moved back to the I-A Division in 1995, and were defeated in their first modern bowl game by Colorado State in the 2001 New Orleans Bowl.

== Seasons ==
Conference champions †	Bowl game/postseason berth ^

Season	Team	Coach	Conference	Season results					Bowl result	Final ranking	
Season	Team	Coach	Conference	Conference finish	Wins	Losses	Ties	Winning percentage	Bowl result	AP Poll	Coaches Poll
1913	1913	J. W. Pender	Independent	—	0	1	0	.000	—	—	—
1914	1914	J. W. Pender	Independent	—	3	3	0	0.500	—	—	—
1915	1915	James W. St. Clair	Independent	—	5	1	1	0.786	—	—	—
1916	1916	James W. St. Clair	Independent	—	4	3	1	0.563	—	—	—
1917	1917	James W. St. Clair	Independent	—	6	1	0	0.857	—	—	—
1918	1918	James W. St. Clair	Independent	—	1	2	1	0.375	—	—	—
1919	1919	James W. St. Clair	Independent	—	5	3	0	0.625	—	—	—
1920	1920	Theron J. Fouts	Independent	—	7	1	0	0.875	—	—	—
1921	1921	Theron J. Fouts	Independent	—	3	3	0	0.500	—	—	—
1922	1922	Theron J. Fouts	Texas Intercollegiate Athletic Association	2nd	5	2	1	0.688	—	—	—
1923	1923	Theron J. Fouts	Texas Intercollegiate Athletic Association	6th	3	5	0	0.375	—	—	—
1924	1924	Theron J. Fouts	Texas Intercollegiate Athletic Association	2nd	5	3	1	0.611	—	—	—
1925	1925	John B. Reid	Texas Intercollegiate Athletic Association	T–4th	6	4	0	0.600	—	—	—
1926	1926	John B. Reid	Texas Intercollegiate Athletic Association	T–2nd	5	3	1	0.611	—	—	—
1927	1927	John B. Reid	Texas Intercollegiate Athletic Association	T–9th	1	6	2	0.222	—	—	—
1928	1928	John B. Reid	Texas Intercollegiate Athletic Association	5th	4	5	0	0.444	—	—	—
1929	1929	Jack Sisco	Texas Intercollegiate Athletic Association	2nd	4	3	2	0.556	—	—	—
1930	1930	Jack Sisco	Texas Intercollegiate Athletic Association	3rd	5	4	1	0.550	—	—	—
1931	1931 †	Jack Sisco	Texas Intercollegiate Athletic Association	1st †	8	3	0	0.727	—	—	—
1932	1932 †	Jack Sisco	Lone Star Conference	1st †	8	1	1	0.850	—	—	—
1933	1933	Jack Sisco	Lone Star Conference	3rd	3	4	2	0.444	—	—	—
1934	1934	Jack Sisco	Lone Star Conference	T–2nd	5	4	0	0.556	—	—	—
1935	1935 †	Jack Sisco	Lone Star Conference	T–1st †	5	3	1	0.611	—	—	—
1936	1936 †	Jack Sisco	Lone Star Conference	1st †	6	2	1	0.722	—	—	—
1937	1937	Jack Sisco	Lone Star Conference	2nd	4	4	2	0.500	—	—	—
1938	1938	Jack Sisco	Lone Star Conference	3rd	7	4	0	0.636	—	—	—
1939	1939 †	Jack Sisco	Lone Star Conference	1st †	6	1	0	0.857	—	—	—
1940	1940 †	Jack Sisco	Lone Star Conference	1st †	6	3	0	0.667	—	—	—
1941	1941 †	Jack Sisco	Lone Star Conference	1st †	7	1	0	0.875	—	—	—
1942	1942	Lloyd Russell	Lone Star Conference	3rd	3	5	0	0.375	—	—	—
1946	1946 †	Odus Mitchell	Lone Star Conference	1st †	7	3	1	0.682	Won Optimist Bowl vs. Pacific (CA), 14–13 ^	—	—
1947	1947 †	Odus Mitchell	Lone Star Conference	1st †	10	2	0	0.833	Lost Salad Bowl vs. Nevada, 6–13 ^	—	—
1948	1948	Odus Mitchell	Lone Star Conference	2nd	6	4	0	0.600	—	—	—
1949	1949	Odus Mitchell	Gulf Coast Conference	2nd	8	4	0	0.667	—	—	—
1950	1950 †	Odus Mitchell	Gulf Coast Conference	1st †	7	2	1	0.750	—	—	—
1951	1951 †	Odus Mitchell	Gulf Coast Conference	1st †	8	4	0	0.667	—	—	—
1952	1952 †	Odus Mitchell	Gulf Coast Conference	1st †	7	3	0	0.700	—	—	—
1953	1953	Odus Mitchell	Gulf Coast Conference	2nd	3	6	1	0.350	—	—	—
1954	1954	Odus Mitchell	Gulf Coast Conference	2nd	4	6	0	0.400	—	—	—
1955	1955 †	Odus Mitchell	Gulf Coast Conference	T–1st †	5	4	1	0.550	—	—	—
1956	1956 †	Odus Mitchell	Gulf Coast Conference	T–1st †	7	2	1	0.750	—	—	—
1957	1957	Odus Mitchell	Missouri Valley Conference	2nd	5	5	0	0.500	—	—	—
1958	1958 †	Odus Mitchell	Missouri Valley Conference	1st †	7	2	1	0.750	—	—	—
1959	1959 †	Odus Mitchell	Missouri Valley Conference	T–1st †	9	2	0	0.818	Lost Sun Bowl vs. New Mexico State, 8–28 ^	—	—
1960	1960	Odus Mitchell	Missouri Valley Conference	4th	2	6	1	0.278	—	—	—
1961	1961	Odus Mitchell	Missouri Valley Conference	T–2nd	5	4	1	0.550	—	—	—
1962	1962	Odus Mitchell	Missouri Valley Conference	2nd	6	4	0	0.600	—	—	—
1963	1963	Odus Mitchell	Missouri Valley Conference	T–3rd	3	6	0	0.333	—	—	—
1964	1964	Odus Mitchell	Missouri Valley Conference	4th	2	7	1	0.250	—	—	—
1965	1965	Odus Mitchell	Missouri Valley Conference	T–3rd	3	7	0	0.300	—	—	—
1966	1966 †	Odus Mitchell	Missouri Valley Conference	T–1st †	8	2	0	0.800	—	—	—
1967	1967 †	Rod Rust	Missouri Valley Conference	1st †	7	1	1	0.833	—	—	—
1968	1968	Rod Rust	Missouri Valley Conference	2nd	8	2	0	0.800	—	—	—
1969	1969	Rod Rust	Missouri Valley Conference	2nd	7	3	0	0.700	—	—	—
1970	1970	Rod Rust	Missouri Valley Conference	4th	3	8	0	0.273	—	—	—
1971	1971 †	Rod Rust	Missouri Valley Conference	1st †	3	8	0	0.273	—	—	—
1972	1972	Rod Rust	Missouri Valley Conference	8th	1	10	0	0.091	—	—	—
1973	1973 †	Hayden Fry	Missouri Valley Conference	T–1st †	5	5	1	0.500	—	—	—
1974	1974	Hayden Fry	Missouri Valley Conference	6th	2	7	2	0.273	—	—	—
1975	1975	Hayden Fry	NCAA Division I/I-A independent	—	7	4	0	0.636	—	—	—
1976	1976	Hayden Fry	NCAA Division I/I-A independent	—	7	4	0	0.636	—	—	—
1977	1977	Hayden Fry	NCAA Division I/I-A independent	—	10	1	0	0.909	—	—	16
1978	1978	Hayden Fry	NCAA Division I/I-A independent	—	9	2	0	0.818	—	—	—
1979	1979	Jerry Moore	NCAA Division I/I-A independent	—	5	6	0	0.455	—	—	—
1980	1980	Jerry Moore	NCAA Division I/I-A independent	—	6	5	0	0.545	—	—	—
1981	1981	Bob Tyler	NCAA Division I/I-A independent	—	2	9	0	0.182	—	—	—
1982	1982	Corky Nelson	Southland Conference	NA	2	9	0	0.182	—	—	—
1983	1983 †	Corky Nelson	Southland Conference	T–1st †	8	4	0	0.667	Lost NCAA Division I-AA Quarterfinal vs. Nevada, 17–20 OT ^	—	—
1984	1984	Corky Nelson	Southland Conference	T–6th	2	9	0	0.182	—	—	—
1985	1985	Corky Nelson	Southland Conference	T–5th	4	6	1	0.409	—	—	—
1986	1986	Corky Nelson	Southland Conference	T–2nd	6	4	0	0.600	—	—	—
1987	1987	Corky Nelson	Southland Conference	T–2nd	7	5	0	0.583	Lost NCAA Division I-AA First Round vs. Northeast Louisiana, 9–30 ^	—	—
1988	1988	Corky Nelson	Southland Conference	3rd	8	4	0	0.667	Lost NCAA Division I-AA First Round vs. Marshall, 0–7 ^	—	—
1989	1989	Corky Nelson	Southland Conference	T–5th	5	6	0	0.455	—	—	—
1990	1990	Corky Nelson	Southland Conference	6th	6	5	0	0.545	—	—	—
1991	1991	Dennis Parker	Southland Conference	T–6th	3	7	1	0.318	—	—	—
1992	1992	Dennis Parker	Southland Conference	5th	4	7	0	0.364	—	—	—
1993	1993	Dennis Parker	Southland Conference	T–5th	4	7	0	0.364	—	—	—
1994	1994 †	Matt Simon	Southland Conference	1st †	7	4	1	0.625	Lost NCAA Division I-AA First Round vs. Boise State, 20–24 ^	—	—
1995	1995	Matt Simon	NCAA Division I-A independent	—	2	9	0	0.182	—	—	—
1996	1996	Matt Simon	Big West Conference	T–3rd	5	6	—	0.455	—	—	—
1997	1997	Matt Simon	Big West Conference	T–4th	4	7	—	0.364	—	—	—
1998	1998	Darrell Dickey	Big West Conference	T–2nd	3	8	—	0.273	—	—	—
1999	1999	Darrell Dickey	Big West Conference	7th	2	9	—	0.182	—	—	—
2000	2000	Darrell Dickey	Big West Conference	T–3rd	3	8	—	0.273	—	—	—
2001	2001 †	Darrell Dickey	Sun Belt Conference	1st †	5	7	—	0.455	Lost New Orleans Bowl vs. Colorado State, 20–45 ^	—	—
2002	2002 †	Darrell Dickey	Sun Belt Conference	1st †	8	5	—	0.615	Won New Orleans Bowl vs. Cincinnati, 24–19 ^	—	—
2003	2003 †	Darrell Dickey	Sun Belt Conference	1st †	9	4	—	0.692	Lost New Orleans Bowl vs. Memphis, 17–27 ^	—	—
2004	2004 †	Darrell Dickey	Sun Belt Conference	1st †	7	5	—	0.583	Lost New Orleans Bowl vs. Southern Miss, 10–31 ^	—	—
2005	2005	Darrell Dickey	Sun Belt Conference	7th	2	9	—	0.182	—	—	—
2006	2006	Darrell Dickey	Sun Belt Conference	7th	3	9	—	0.250	—	—	—
2007	2007	Todd Dodge	Sun Belt Conference	7th	2	10	—	0.167	—	—	—
2008	2008	Todd Dodge	Sun Belt Conference	8th	1	11	—	0.083	—	—	—
2009	2008	Todd Dodge	Sun Belt Conference	8th	2	10	—	0.167	—	—	—
2010	2010	Todd Dodge; Mike Canales	Sun Belt Conference	T–6th	3	9	—	0.250	—	—	—
2011	2011	Dan McCarney	Sun Belt Conference	5th	5	7	—	0.417	—	—	—
2012	2012	Dan McCarney	Sun Belt Conference	T–6th	4	8	—	0.333	—	—	—
2013	2013	Dan McCarney	Conference USA	T–2nd (West)	9	4	—	0.692	Won Heart of Dallas Bowl vs. UNLV, 36–14 ^	—	—
2014	2014	Dan McCarney	Conference USA	5th (West)	4	8	—	0.333	—	—	—
2015	2015	Dan McCarney; Mike Canales	Conference USA	6th (West)	1	11	—	0.083	—	—	—
2016	2016	Seth Littrell	Conference USA	4th (West)	5	8	—	0.385	Lost Heart of Dallas Bowl vs. Army, 31–38 ^	—	—
2017	2017	Seth Littrell	Conference USA	1st (West)	9	5	—	0.643	Lost New Orleans Bowl vs. Troy, 30–50 ^	—	—
2018	2018	Seth Littrell	Conference USA	T–2nd (West)	9	4	—	0.692	Lost New Mexico Bowl vs. Utah State, 13–52 ^	—	—
2019	2019	Seth Littrell	Conference USA	T–4th (West)	4	8	—	0.333	—	—	—
2020	2020	Seth Littrell	Conference USA	4th (West)	4	6	—	0.400	Lost Myrtle Beach Bowl vs. Appalachian State, 28–56 ^	—	—
2021	2021	Seth Littrell	Conference USA	3rd (West)	6	7	—	0.462	Lost Frisco Football Classic vs. Miami (OH), 14–27 ^	—	—
2022	2022	Seth Littrell; Phil Bennett	Conference USA	T–2nd	7	7	—	0.500	Lost Frisco Bowl vs. Boise State, 32–35 ^	—	—
2023	2023	Eric Morris	American Athletic Conference	T–8th	5	7	—	0.417	—	—	—
2024	2024	Eric Morris	American Athletic Conference	T–9th	6	7	—	0.462	Lost First Responder Bowl vs. Texas State, 28–30 ^	—	—
2025	2025	Eric Morris	American Athletic Conference	T–1st	12	2	—	0.857	Won New Mexico Bowl vs. San Diego State, 49–47 ^	24	—
