= 1965 Wichita State Shockers football team =

American college football season

1965 Wichita State Shockers football
- Conference: Missouri Valley Conference
- Record: 2–7 (0–4 MVC)
- Head coach: George Karras (1st season)
- Home stadium: Veterans Field

1965 Missouri Valley Conference football standings
	Conf.					Overall
Team	W		L		T	W		L		T
Tulsa $	4	–	0	–	0	8	–	3	–	0
Louisville	2	–	1	–	0	6	–	4	–	0
North Texas State	2	–	2	–	0	3	–	7	–	0
Cincinnati	1	–	2	–	0	5	–	5	–	0
Wichita State	0	–	4	–	0	2	–	7	–	0
$ – Conference champion

The 1965 Wichita Shockers football team was an American football team that represented Wichita State University as a member of the Missouri Valley Conference during the 1965 NCAA University Division football season. In its first season under head coach George Karras, the team compiled a 2–7 record (0–4 against conference opponents), finished last out of five teams in the MVC, and was outscored by a total of 170 to 120. The team played its home games at Veterans Field, now known as Cessna Stadium.

== Schedule ==
Date	Opponent	Site	Result	Attendance	Source
September 25	at Montana State*	Gatton Field; Bozeman, MT	L 6–17	8,000	
October 2	at Cincinnati	Nippert Stadium; Cincinnati, OH	L 6–14	10,000	
October 9	at Arizona State*	Sun Devil Stadium; Tempe, AZ	L 6–8	24,687	
October 16	New Mexico State*	Veterans Field; Wichita, KS	L 20–45	10,800	
October 23	Southern Illinois*	Veterans Field; Wichita, KS	W 27–0	9,615	
October 30	at Louisville	Fairgrounds Stadium; Louisville, KY	L 10–30	6,700	
November 6	at North Texas State	Fouts Field; Denton, TX	L 21–24	14,000	
November 13	Utah State*	Veterans Field; Wichita, KS	W 21–19	7,266	
November 20	Tulsa	Veterans Field; Wichita, KS	L 3–13	12,000	
*Non-conference game
