= 1966 Cincinnati Bearcats football team =

American college football season

1966 Cincinnati Bearcats football
- Conference: Missouri Valley Conference
- Record: 3–7 (2–2 MVC)
- Head coach: Chuck Studley (6th season)
- Captains: Jay Bachman; John Parker
- Home stadium: Nippert Stadium

1966 Missouri Valley Conference football standings
	Conf.					Overall
Team	W		L		T	W		L		T
North Texas State +	3	–	1	–	0	8	–	2	–	0
Tulsa +	3	–	1	–	0	6	–	4	–	0
Cincinnati	2	–	2	–	0	3	–	7	–	0
Louisville	1	–	3	–	0	6	–	4	–	0
Wichita State	1	–	3	–	0	2	–	8	–	0
+ – Conference co-champions

The 1966 Cincinnati Bearcats football team represented University of Cincinnati as a member of the Missouri Valley Conference (MVC) during the 1966 NCAA University Division football season. Led by Chuck Studley in his sixth and final season as head coach, the Bearcats compiled an overall record of 3–7 with a mark of 2–2 in conference play, placing third in the MVC. The team played home games at Nippert Stadium in Cincinnati.

The game against Tulsa was the first game a Cincinnati football game was televised from Nippert Stadium.

== Schedule ==
Date	Opponent	Site	Result	Attendance	Source
September 24	Dayton*	Nippert Stadium; Cincinnati, OH	L 7–23	18,000	
October 1	at Wichita State	Veterans Field; Wichita, KS	W 20–6	10,373	
October 8	Xavier*	Nippert Stadium; Cincinnati, OH (rivalry)	L 13–25	22,500	
October 15	at Tulane*	Tulane Stadium; New Orleans, LA	L 21–28	38,570–38,750	
October 22	Kansas State*^{†}	Nippert Stadium; Cincinnati, OH	W 28–14	13,200	
October 29	Tulsa	Nippert Stadium; Cincinnati, OH	L 0–13	18,000	
November 5	at North Texas State	Fouts Field; Denton, TX	L 13–35	16,800	
November 12	Louisville	Nippert Stadium; Cincinnati, OH (rivalry)	W 17–3	10,000	
November 19	at Memphis State*	Memphis Memorial Stadium; Memphis, TN (rivalry)	L 14–26	13,357	
November 26	Miami (OH)*	Nippert Stadium; Cincinnati, OH (Victory Bell)	L 8–28	11,500	
*Non-conference game; ^{†}Homecoming
