= 1965 North Texas State Eagles football team =

American college football season

1965 North Texas State Eagles football
- Conference: Missouri Valley Conference
- Record: 3–7 (2–2 MVC)
- Head coach: Odus Mitchell (20th season)
- Home stadium: Fouts Field

1965 Missouri Valley Conference football standings
	Conf.					Overall
Team	W		L		T	W		L		T
Tulsa $	4	–	0	–	0	8	–	3	–	0
Louisville	2	–	1	–	0	6	–	4	–	0
North Texas State	2	–	2	–	0	3	–	7	–	0
Cincinnati	1	–	2	–	0	5	–	5	–	0
Wichita State	0	–	4	–	0	2	–	7	–	0
$ – Conference champion

The 1965 North Texas State Eagles football team was an American football team that represented North Texas State University (now known as the University of North Texas) during the 1965 NCAA University Division football season as a member of the Missouri Valley Conference. In their 20th year under head coach Odus Mitchell, the team compiled a 3–7 record.

== Schedule ==
Date	Opponent	Site	Result	Attendance	Source
September 18	at Texas Western*	Sun Bowl; El Paso, TX	L 15–61	22,515	
September 25	Parsons*	Fouts Field; Denton, TX	W 26–7		
October 2	Louisville	Fouts Field; Denton, TX	L 21–29	5,000	
October 9	at Tampa*	Phillips Field; Tampa, FL	L 14–17	8,000	
October 16	Tulsa	Fouts Field; Denton, TX	L 20–27	7,000–8,000	
October 23	at No. 1 Arkansas*	War Memorial Stadium; Little Rock, AR	L 20–55	35,000–42,000	
October 30	at Cincinnati	Nippert Stadium; Cincinnati, OH	W 28–24	12,000	
November 6	Wichita State^{†}	Fouts Field; Denton, TX	W 24–21	14,000	
November 13	Memphis State*	Fouts Field; Denton, TX	L 0–28	5,000	
November 20	at New Mexico State*	Memorial Stadium; Las Cruces, NM	L 13–43	> 10,000	
*Non-conference game; ^{†}Homecoming; Rankings from AP Poll released prior to the game
