= 1965 Louisville Cardinals football team =

American college football season

1965 Louisville Cardinals football
- Conference: Missouri Valley Conference
- Record: 6–4 (2–1 MVC)
- Head coach: Frank Camp (20th season)
- Home stadium: Fairgrounds Stadium

1965 Missouri Valley Conference football standings
	Conf.					Overall
Team	W		L		T	W		L		T
Tulsa $	4	–	0	–	0	8	–	3	–	0
Louisville	2	–	1	–	0	6	–	4	–	0
North Texas State	2	–	2	–	0	3	–	7	–	0
Cincinnati	1	–	2	–	0	5	–	5	–	0
Wichita State	0	–	4	–	0	2	–	7	–	0
$ – Conference champion

The 1965 Louisville Cardinals football team was an American football team that represented the University of Louisville in the Missouri Valley Conference (MVC) during the 1965 NCAA University Division football season. In their 20th season under head coach Frank Camp, the Cardinals compiled a 6–4 record (2–1 against conference opponents) and outscored opponents by a total of 218 to 164.

The team's statistical leaders included Benny Russell with 1,791 passing yards, Wayne Patrick with 428 rushing yards, Mike Dennis with 587 receiving yards, and Al MacFarlane and Benny Russell with 48 points each.

== Schedule ==
Date	Opponent	Site	Result	Attendance	Source
September 18	at Western Michigan*	Waldo Stadium; Kalamazoo, MI	L 13–17	13,500	
September 25	Southern Illinois*	Fairgrounds Stadium; Louisville, KY	W 13–0	7,000	
October 2	at North Texas State	Fouts Field; Denton, TX	W 29–21	5,000	
October 9	Dayton*	Fairgrounds Stadium; Louisville, KY	W 34–0	7,800	
October 16	East Carolina*	Fairgrounds Stadium; Louisville, KY	L 20–34	8,800	
October 23	Marshall*	Fairgrounds Stadium; Louisville, KY	W 23–7	6,800	
October 30	Wichita State	Fairgrounds Stadium; Louisville, KY	W 30–10	6,700	
November 6	at Tulsa	Skelly Field; Tulsa, OK	L 18–51	35,783	
November 13	at Drake*	Drake Stadium; Des Moines, IA	W 32–17	3,500	
November 20	at Kent State*	Memorial Stadium; Kent, OH	L 6–7	5,500	
*Non-conference game
