= 1965 Tulsa Golden Hurricane football team =

American college football season

1965 Tulsa Golden Hurricane football

MVC champion

Bluebonnet Bowl, L 6–27 vs. Tennessee
- Conference: Missouri Valley Conference

Ranking
- Coaches: No. 16
- Record: 8–3 (4–0 MVC)
- Head coach: Glenn Dobbs (5th season)
- Home stadium: Skelly Stadium

1965 Missouri Valley Conference football standings
	Conf.					Overall
Team	W		L		T	W		L		T
Tulsa $	4	–	0	–	0	8	–	3	–	0
Louisville	2	–	1	–	0	6	–	4	–	0
North Texas State	2	–	2	–	0	3	–	7	–	0
Cincinnati	1	–	2	–	0	5	–	5	–	0
Wichita State	0	–	4	–	0	2	–	7	–	0
$ – Conference champion

The 1965 Tulsa Golden Hurricane football team represented the University of Tulsa during the 1965 NCAA University Division football season. In their fifth year under head coach Glenn Dobbs, the Golden Hurricane compiled an 8–3 record, 4–0 against Missouri Valley Conference opponents, and lost to Tennessee, 27–6 in the Bluebonnet Bowl. Under Glenn Dobbs, Tulsa led the nation in passing for five straight years from 1962 to 1966.

The 1965 team was led by record-setting performances from quarterback Billy Anderson and end Howard Twilley. Anderson set five NCAA major college, single-season records with 3,464 passing yards, 3,343 yards of total offense (334.3 per game), 509 pass attempts, 296 completions, and 580 total offense plays. Twilley set eight new major college records, including 19 receptions in a game, 134 receptions in a season, 261 receptions in a career, five touchdown receptions in a game, 16 touchdown receptions in a season, 32 touchdown catches in a career, 1,779 receiving yards in a season, and 3,343 receiving yards in a career. He also led the NCAA in 1965 with 121 points. Twilley was a consensus first-team All-American in 1965. He went on to play 11 seasons in the National Football League (NFL) and was inducted into the College Football Hall of Fame in 1992.

== Schedule ==
Date	Opponent	Site	TV	Result	Attendance	Source
September 11	at Houston*	Houston Astrodome; Houston, TX		W 14–0	37,138	
September 25	at No. 5 Arkansas*	Razorback Stadium; Fayetteville, AR		L 12–20	34,000	
October 2	at Oklahoma State*	Lewis Field; Stillwater, OK (rivalry)		L 14–17	27,000	
October 9	Memphis State*	Skelly Stadium; Tulsa, OK		W 32–28	25,315	
October 16	at North Texas State	Fouts Field; Denton, TX		W 27–20	7,000–8,000	
October 23	Cincinnati	Skelly Stadium; Tulsa, OK		W 49–6	24,867	
October 30	at Southern Illinois*	McAndrew Stadium; Carbondale, IL		W 55–12	15,000	
November 6	Louisville^{†}	Skelly Stadium; Tulsa, OK		W 51–18	35,783	
November 20	at Wichita State	Veterans Stadium; Wichita, KS		W 13–3	12,000	
November 25	Colorado State*	Skelly Stadium; Tulsa, OK		W 48–20	29,631	
December 18	vs. No. 7 Tennessee*	Rice Stadium; Houston TX (Bluebonnet Bowl)	NBC	L 6–27	40,000	
*Non-conference game; ^{†}Homecoming; Rankings from AP Poll released prior to the game

== After the season ==
=== 1966 NFL draft ===
The following Golden Hurricane players were selected in the 1966 NFL draft following the season.

Round	Pick	Player	Position	NFL club
2	22	Willie Townes	Defensive end	Dallas Cowboys
3	34	Dick Tyson	Guard	Los Angeles Rams
10	144	John Osmond	Center	Philadelphia Eagles
14	209	Howard Twilley	Wide receiver	Minnesota Vikings
20	292	Bud Harrington	Gridiron	Los Angeles Rams

=== 1966 AFL draft ===
The following Golden Hurricane players were selected in the 1966 American Football League draft following the season.

Round	Pick	Player	Position	AFL club
4	71	Dick Tyson	Guard	Oakland Raiders
6	47	John Osmond	Center	Kansas City Chiefs
12	101	Howard Twilley	Wide receiver	Miami Dolphins

=== AFL redshirt draft ===
Round	Pick	Player	Position	AFL club
1	2	Willie Townes	Defensive end	Boston Patriots
9	75	Bud Harrington	Gridiron	Denver Broncos
