= 1966 Wichita State Shockers football team =

American college football season

1966 Wichita State Shockers football
- Conference: Missouri Valley Conference
- Record: 2–8 (1–3 MVC)
- Head coach: George Karras (2nd season)
- Home stadium: Veterans Field

1966 Missouri Valley Conference football standings
	Conf.					Overall
Team	W		L		T	W		L		T
North Texas State +	3	–	1	–	0	8	–	2	–	0
Tulsa +	3	–	1	–	0	6	–	4	–	0
Cincinnati	2	–	2	–	0	3	–	7	–	0
Louisville	1	–	3	–	0	6	–	4	–	0
Wichita State	1	–	3	–	0	2	–	8	–	0
+ – Conference co-champions

The 1966 Wichita Shockers football team was an American football team that represented Wichita State University as a member of the Missouri Valley Conference during the 1966 NCAA University Division football season. In its second season under head coach George Karras, the team compiled a 2–8 record (1–3 against conference opponents), tied for last place in the MVC, and was outscored by a total of 314 to 119. The team played its home games at Veterans Field, now known as Cessna Stadium.

Wichita State quarterback John Eckman ranked second in the country with 2,339 passing yards and also set an NCAA record with 37 interceptions. He also led the country in pass completions (195), pass attempts (458), and total plays (539), and ranked second in yards gained per game (233.9) and fifth in total yards (2,174).

== Schedule ==
Date	Opponent	Site	Result	Attendance	Source
September 17	at Southern Illinois*	McAndrew Stadium; Carbondale, IL	L 7–17	6,000	
October 1	Cincinnati	Veterans Field; Wichita, KS	L 6–20	10,373	
October 8	at Drake*	Drake Stadium; Des Moines, IA	L 16–34	9,500	
October 15	at New Mexico State*	Memorial Stadium; Las Cruces, NM	L 17–45	17,500	
October 22	at Arkansas*	War Memorial Stadium; Little Rock, AR	L 0–41	42,000	
October 29	Louisville	Veterans Field; Wichita, KS	W 9–2	7,133	
November 5	Wyoming*	Veterans Field; Wichita, KS	L 0–55	9,133–9,173	
November 12	North Texas State	Veterans Field; Wichita, KS	L 13–30	5,444	
November 19	Colorado State*	Veterans Field; Wichita, KS	W 37–23	4,388	
November 24	at Tulsa	Skelly Stadium; Tulsa, OK	L 14–47	14,500	
*Non-conference game
