= Bill Parcells =

American football coach (born 1941)

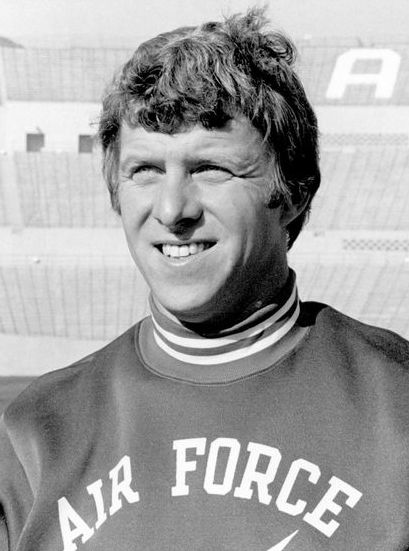
- Parcells as the head coach of Air Force in 1978

Personal information
- Born: August 22, 1941 (age 85); Englewood, New Jersey, U.S.

Career information
- High school: River Dell (Oradell, New Jersey)
- College: Wichita State (1960–1963)
- NFL draft: 1964: 7th round, 89th overall pick

Career history

Playing
- Detroit Lions (1964)*
- * Offseason or practice squad member only

Coaching
- Hastings (1964) Linebackers coach; Wichita State (1965) Linebackers coach; Army (1966–1967) Linebackers coach; Army (1968–1969) Defensive coordinator; Florida State (1970–1972) Linebackers coach; Vanderbilt (1973–1974) Linebackers coach; Texas Tech (1975–1977) Defensive coordinator & linebackers coach; Air Force (1978) Head coach; New York Giants (1979) Defensive coordinator Resigned in the offseason after six weeks; New England Patriots (1980) Linebackers coach; New York Giants (1981–1982) Defensive coordinator & linebackers coach; New York Giants (1983–1990) Head coach; New England Patriots (1993–1996) Head coach; New York Jets (1997–1999) Head coach; Dallas Cowboys (2003–2006) Head coach

Operations
- New England Patriots (1993–1996) General manager; New York Jets (1997–2000) General manager; Miami Dolphins (2008–2010) Executive VP of football operations

Awards and highlights
- 2× Super Bowl champion (XXI, XXV); 2× AP NFL Coach of the Year (1986, 1994); The Sporting News NFL Coach of Year (1986); 2× Pro Football Weekly NFL Coach of Year (1986, 1994); Greasy Neale Award (1994); NFL 1990s All-Decade Team; New York Giants Ring of Honor; New England Patriots Hall of Fame; New England Patriots All-1990s Team

Head coaching record
- Regular season: NFL: 172–130–1 (.569); NCAA: 3–8 (.273)
- Postseason: 11–8 (.579)
- Career: 183–138–1 (.570)
- Coaching profile at Pro Football Reference
- Executive profile at Pro Football Reference
- Pro Football Hall of Fame

Duane Charles "Bill" Parcells (/pɑːrˈsɛlz/ par-SELZ; born August 22, 1941) is an American former football coach who served as a head coach in the National Football League (NFL) for 19 seasons. He came to prominence as the head coach of the New York Giants from 1983 to 1990, winning two Super Bowl titles. Parcells was later the head coach of the New England Patriots from 1993 to 1996, the New York Jets from 1997 to 2000, and the Dallas Cowboys from 2003 to 2006. Nicknamed "the Big Tuna", he is the only NFL coach to lead four different franchises to the playoffs and three to a conference championship game.

As the head coach of the Giants, Parcells took over a franchise that had qualified for the playoffs only once in the past decade and had only one winning record in their last 10 seasons. Within four years, he guided them to their first Super Bowl title and won a second championship in Super Bowl XXV four years later. Parcells retired following the second Super Bowl, but came out of retirement in 1993 to become the head coach of the Patriots, another struggling franchise at the time. By his fourth season, New England reached Super Bowl XXXI, although the game ended in defeat. He left the Patriots after their Super Bowl loss and became the head coach and general manager of the Jets, who went from a one-win season to appearing in the AFC Championship Game by his second year.

Parcells retired for a second time in 1999, but returned again in 2003 as the head coach of the Cowboys. The Cowboys made two playoff appearances under Parcells, although both ended in first-round defeats, leading to his third and final retirement in 2007. Following his final retirement from coaching, Parcells served as the vice president of football operations for the Miami Dolphins from 2008 to 2010. He was inducted to the Pro Football Hall of Fame in 2013.

== Early life ==
Parcells was born in Englewood, New Jersey, on August 22, 1941. He grew up in the nearby town of Hasbrouck Heights. His mother, Ida Parcells (born Naclerio), was a housewife while his father, Charles (Chubby) Parcells, played quarterback at Georgetown University and worked for the FBI before becoming a lawyer for Uniroyal Tires.

Prior to his sophomore year in high school, the Parcells family moved a few miles north to the town of Oradell, where he attended River Dell Regional High School. While he was at River Dell, he was routinely mistaken for another boy named Bill. As he had always disliked his given name of Duane, he decided to adopt Bill as his nickname. While coaching the New York Giants, Parcells and his family lived in upscale Upper Saddle River, a New Jersey town which was the home of Giants General Manager George Young as well.

Parcells was an athlete as a youth. At 6 feet 2 inches (1.88 m) upon entering River Dell, he was large for his age, which enabled him to become a standout player on his high school's football, baseball, and basketball teams. His football coach at River Dell was Tom Cahill, who would later become the head coach at Army. His basketball coach at River Dell was Mickey Corcoran, whom Parcells considers to be "next to my father ... the most important influence in my life." Corcoran would serve Parcells as an advisor and confidant throughout his coaching career.

== Playing career ==
Upon graduating from high school, Parcells arrived at Colgate University. As a freshman, he was offered a contract by the Philadelphia Phillies. His father disapproved of a career in sports and wanted him to study law, so the younger Parcells declined the offer. He soon transferred to the University of Wichita (now known as Wichita State University), where he played linebacker and earned a physical education degree.

He was drafted in the seventh round (89th overall) by the Detroit Lions as an offensive lineman, but was released by the team before playing a single NFL game when he reportedly quit the team after a hot morning workout.

== College coaching career ==
At the conclusion of his playing days, Parcells took a close look at his future. He was considering attending law school or becoming a franchise owner for Pizza Hut, where he had worked in college. Instead, he chose to pursue a career in football. He began as an assistant coach at Hastings (1964) before moving on to Wichita State (1965), Army (1966–69), Florida State (1970–72), Vanderbilt (1973–74), and Texas Tech (1975–77). In 1978, he became the head coach at the Air Force Academy for one season.

While serving as linebackers coach at Army, Parcells was also a part-time assistant basketball coach for Bob Knight during the 1966–67 season, which led to their longtime friendship.

== Professional coaching career ==
=== New York Giants (1979) ===
In 1979, Parcells accepted an offer to become the defensive coordinator of the New York Giants under head coach Ray Perkins. However, when his wife Judy and three daughters wanted to stay in Colorado, he resigned and took a job with a land development company in Colorado. While living in Colorado, Parcells became a season ticket holder with the Denver Broncos. Parcells called it the most miserable year of his life. Recognizing his unhappiness, his wife eventually encouraged him to return to coaching, paving the way for his eventual tenure with the Giants.

=== New England Patriots (1980) ===
Feeling dissatisfied with his life away from football, Parcells returned to the sport in 1980 as the linebackers coach of the New England Patriots under Ron Erhardt. It was during this stint with the Patriots that Parcells adopted his "Big Tuna" nickname. Whenever he thought his players were trying to get away with something, Parcells would yell "Who do you think I am? Charlie the Tuna?," referencing a StarKist commercial of the era featuring a naive cartoon fish named, "Charlie the Tuna."

=== New York Giants (1981–1990) ===
The following season, Parcells was approached once again by Perkins to join the Giants' staff as an assistant coach, and Parcells accepted the offer. As defensive coordinator and linebackers coach, he was allowed to change the team's 4–3 defense to a 3–4 system. When Perkins announced on December 15, 1982, that he was leaving the Giants at the end of the season to become head coach and athletic director at the University of Alabama, the Giants announced that Parcells would succeed him as head coach.

When Parcells took over in 1983, the team had posted just one winning season in the previous ten years. In his first year, he made a controversial decision to bench Phil Simms in favor of Scott Brunner due to Brunner's success in leading the Giants to the 1981 post-season. Also, Simms had missed the entire 1982 season in addition to the latter part of 1981 due to injury. Brunner struggled and Parcells went back to Simms in week 6, but Simms broke his thumb and missed the rest of 1983. The result was a disastrous 3–12–1 season during which the Giants surreptitiously offered Parcells's job to University of Miami head coach Howard Schnellenberger after a week 14 loss to the St. Louis Cardinals; however, Schnellenberger declined, and Parcells remained as head coach.

After this dismal first season, Parcells made a finally healthy Simms the starter again for 1984 and replaced half the roster. The team's record improved to 9–7 and 10–6 over the next two years, and earned them their first back-to-back playoff appearances since 1961–1963. In 1986, he led the Giants to the first of two Super Bowls. In the 1986 season, the Giants compiled a franchise-best 14–2 record and the first of three division titles. Parcells, whose stifling 3–4 defense (known as the Big Blue Wrecking Crew) led by Lawrence Taylor, Carl Banks, Harry Carson, and Leonard Marshall, and an offense under the direction of Phil Simms, knocked off the San Francisco 49ers 49–3, and the Washington Redskins 17–0, in the playoffs before routing the Denver Broncos 39–20 in Super Bowl XXI. Parcells is credited as the first head coach to be doused with Gatorade at the end of a Super Bowl, which led to a Super Bowl tradition. While there are some claims that Chicago Bears head coach Mike Ditka had been doused a year earlier, NFL Films president Steve Sabol has stated that he can find no evidence to support it in any footage he has reviewed and that he believes the tradition started with Parcells and Jim Burt.

Following the Super Bowl win, Parcells was courted by the Atlanta Falcons to become the head coach and general manager of the franchise. However, NFL Commissioner Pete Rozelle would not allow Parcells to break his contract with the Giants and he stayed in New York.

Parcells led the Giants to a second Super Bowl in 1990. The Giants began the 1990 season 10–0, but lost Phil Simms to injury late in the season and finished 13–3. Playing with a back-up quarterback in Jeff Hostetler and a 33-year-old veteran running back in Ottis Anderson, the Giants convincingly defeated the Chicago Bears in the divisional playoff, 31–3. They followed that up with a dramatic, come-from-behind fashion over San Francisco, 15–13, in the NFC Championship game on a last-second 42-yard field goal by Matt Bahr, set up by a Roger Craig fumble caused by nose tackle Erik Howard. Super Bowl XXV proved equally exciting as the Giants used a tough defensive scheme crafted by defensive coordinator Bill Belichick and a ball-control and power-running Erhardt – Perkins style offense to stop the Buffalo Bills, 20–19, whose own last-second 47-yard field goal attempt by Scott Norwood missed Wide Right. Parcells retired from football after Super Bowl XXV due to health problems.

During his coaching tenure, the Giants secured three division titles (1986, 1989, 1990), had only two losing seasons (the Giants went 6–9 during the strike year of 1987), and tallied an 8–3 playoff record. Parcells, along with former Giants head coach Tom Coughlin, both made the NFL playoffs five times as Giants head coach, and the two Super Bowl titles they each won with the Giants occurred in their fourth and eighth seasons with the franchise, respectively.

=== First retirement ===
Following retirement, Parcells spent time as a football analyst for NBC Sports from 1991 to 1992, working as a commentator. He also co-hosted a local sports show in New York with Mike Francesa called Around the NFL.

In 1992, Parcells made a handshake agreement to become head coach of the Tampa Bay Buccaneers. At the last minute, Parcells opted not to take the job. Parcells did not feel the situation was right for him at that time. Buccaneers owner Hugh Culverhouse said, "I feel like I've been jilted at the altar."

Parcells was also offered by his friend Ron Wolf the opportunity to become the new head coach of the Green Bay Packers in 1992, but Parcells declined, saying that he needed open heart surgery. The job instead went to Mike Holmgren, who would later coach against Parcells in Super Bowl XXXI.

=== New England Patriots (1993–1996) ===
After a two-year hiatus, Parcells returned to the NFL in 1993 as the head coach for the struggling New England Patriots, who were fresh off of a 2–14 record in 1992. Within two years, he coached the team to a 10–6 record in 1994 and its first playoff game in eight years. In 1996, he guided the Patriots to their first division title in 11 years, and only the second and third home playoff games in franchise history. The Patriots went all the way to Super Bowl XXXI, but lost to the Green Bay Packers, 35–21, in New Orleans.

Parcells left the Patriots after disagreements with owner Robert Kraft, who had bought the team in early 1994, after Parcells's first year as head coach. Parcells had effectively been the team's general manager since arriving in New England, but felt Kraft would not allow him enough input in player personnel decisions. Upon his departure, Parcells famously stated: "They want you to cook the dinner; at least they ought to let you shop for some of the groceries. Okay?" This was mainly in reference to an incident in the Patriots' war room during the 1996 draft. Parcells wanted to draft defensive end Tony Brackens with their first-round choice, but was vetoed by Kraft. They ultimately selected Ohio State wide receiver Terry Glenn.

=== New York Jets (1997–1999) ===
Although Parcells had decided to leave New England, his contract did not allow him to coach anywhere else.

The Giants seriously considered offering him his old job as head coach of their organization, but in a dramatic behind-the-scenes event ended up offering the job to Jim Fassel instead.

The New York Jets sought Parcells as head coach and general manager after a 4–28 record under Rich Kotite. To circumvent Parcells's contractual obligations, the Jets hired Bill Belichick (then the No. 1 assistant to Parcells) as the Jets head coach, and then hired Parcells in an "advisory" role. New England threatened legal action against Parcells and the Jets, but NFL Commissioner Paul Tagliabue brokered a deal between the two sides, with New England releasing Parcells from his contract and the Jets giving New England a third- and fourth-round pick that year, a second-round pick the next year and a first-round draft choice the year after that. Jets owner Leon Hess gave Parcells complete control over football operations, the main sticking point in his dispute with Kraft.

==== 1997–98 ====
Parcells again orchestrated a remarkable turnaround in his first year with the Jets. In his first season with the Jets, the team barely missed the playoffs with a record of 9–7 (the Jets were 1–15 the year before Parcells arrived, and had won a total of 10 games in the previous three seasons combined). In 1998, the Jets went to the playoffs with a current franchise-best 12–4 record, which was good enough for second place in the conference and earned the Jets their third home playoff game since moving to New Jersey in 1984 (their first home playoff game was against the New England Patriots following the 1985 season), but they lost to the eventual Super Bowl XXXIII champion Denver Broncos in the AFC Championship Game, in which New York had led 10–0 in the third quarter before Denver scored 23 unanswered points. It was the only time Parcells lost a conference championship game.

==== 1999 ====
In 1999, expectations were high for the Jets to go to the Super Bowl. However, quarterback Vinny Testaverde ruptured his Achilles tendon in the Jets' home opener against the New England Patriots and the season went downhill from there. After starting the season 1–6, the Jets won three straight and faced the Indianapolis Colts. Parcells emphasized the importance of not obtaining a "7th loss" but they did lose to the Colts and then to the New York Giants the following week. At 4–8, the Jets were in danger of finishing below .500. The Jets would finish 8–8, but out of the playoffs. In 1999, Parcells retired from football for the second time, vowing that he would not coach again. He picked his assistant Bill Belichick to be head coach, which ended up seeing him resign in favor of Al Groh. Parcells remained with the Jets one more year as general manager until he announced his resignation on January 9, 2001. To date, he is the only Jets head coach to leave the team with a winning record after coaching at least two seasons.

=== Dallas Cowboys (2003–2006) ===
Following three straight 5–11 seasons, Dallas Cowboys owner Jerry Jones lured Parcells out of retirement and made him the head coach in 2003.

==== Earn the Star ====
"You knew real quick in my rookie year with Coach Parcells that nothing was going to be given to you, and you had to respect that tradition of what the Cowboys are all about. I thought it (earning the star) was great because nothing is given to you, you have to earn it. That should be especially true for the Cowboys because it's such a great franchise."

— Jason Witten

Always known for deploying psychological tactics and strategies to get the most from his players, Parcells mandated upon his arrival in 2003 that to have the Cowboys star placed on the helmet was a privilege reserved for players that had made the team, not a right, and informed all rookies that regardless of their draft position, it was incumbent upon them to "earn the star." Jones enthusiastically embraced the idea, and supported Parcells's decision to have Cowboys equipment managers remove all of the star logos from rookie helmets. Since then, all drafted and UFA (undrafted free agent) rookies that report to the Cowboys must officially make the roster before having the star logo permanently placed on their helmet.

The practice of "earning the star" has become a permanent fixture of Cowboys tradition, with all of Parcells's successors adopting the practice. As social media emerged, #EarnTheStar and #EarningTheStar became popular Twitter hashtags for Cowboys fans and players.

==== 2003 ====
In his first season with the Cowboys in 2003, he led them to the playoffs with a 10–6 record (losing to the eventual NFC champion Carolina Panthers in the Wild Card round), making him the first head coach in NFL history to guide four teams to the playoffs.

==== 2004 ====
The 2004 season was one of turmoil. Starting quarterback Quincy Carter was terminated for alleged drug use in favor of 40-year-old veteran Vinny Testaverde, who had been brought to the Cowboys from the New York Jets by his former coach in the off-season. While a favorite of Coach Parcells, Testaverde proved ineffective as a starter. The Cowboys started strong, with victories against the Cleveland Browns and Washington Redskins, but injuries, older personnel, spotty play-calling, and persistent penalties hobbled the Cowboys, and they quickly fell off to a 3–5 record by midseason, finishing the season 6–10.

==== 2005 ====
The Cowboys improved their defense before the 2005 season with the additions of first-round draft picks DeMarcus Ware and Marcus Spears. Parcells drafted these players in hopes of jumpstarting the team's transition from the traditional 4–3 defense to a 3–4 defense, which Parcells ran in all of his previous stops. Jerry Jones also added a number of high-priced older veteran players, acquiring nose tackle Jason Ferguson and cornerback Anthony Henry via free agency, and linebacker Scott Fujita via the Kansas City Chiefs. On offense, the Cowboys felt the need to upgrade their passing game to complement their top 2004 draft pick, running back Julius Jones, and acquired quarterback Drew Bledsoe via free agency. During his tenure, Parcells made a point of signing players who had played for him in the past, including Bledsoe, Terry Glenn (with the Patriots), Testaverde, cornerback Aaron Glenn, wide receiver Keyshawn Johnson, and fullback Richie Anderson with the Jets. In 2005, the Cowboys went 9–7, missing the playoffs by one game.

==== 2006 ====
In 2006, the Cowboys signed controversial former Philadelphia Eagles wide receiver Terrell Owens. Keyshawn Johnson was released and signed with the Carolina Panthers. Owens, whom Parcells never referred to by name, but rather as "The Player", was fairly successful with the team. In week 7 of the 2006 season, Parcells decided to replace veteran quarterback Drew Bledsoe with fourth-year quarterback Tony Romo. The Cowboys were 6–4 with Romo as the starter. They finished the season with a 9–7 overall record but failed to win the NFC East Division after a 23–7 loss to the Philadelphia Eagles on Christmas Day in week 16, followed by a loss to the last-place team in the NFC North, the Detroit Lions in week 17. They were able to clinch a playoff berth as the 5th seed in the NFC, eventually losing 21–20 against the Seahawks in Seattle on January 6, on a botched hold by Tony Romo during a field goal attempt.

Parcells would finish his Dallas stint with a 34–30 record and no playoff wins. Parcells's greatest accomplishment as Cowboys head coach was the development of quarterback Tony Romo. He signed Romo in 2003 and helped him develop into a Pro Bowl quarterback by 2006.

=== Third retirement ===
Parcells would have entered the final year of his contract with the Cowboys in 2007, and had been facing questions all year as to whether he would return to the Cowboys to coach his final season. With his 0–2 playoff record over four years as coach of Dallas, many had begun to wonder if the game had simply "passed him by." Immediately following the Cowboys' loss to the Seattle Seahawks, Parcells said that he was unsure if he would return in 2007, and the rumors about Parcells's future escalated.

On January 9, the Newark Star Ledger reported through anonymous sources that Parcells had contacted the New York Giants about their available general manager position, but the Giants were not interested in Parcells's services. Parcells, the next day, quickly refuted any interest in the position, stating, "There is absolutely nothing to it. Whoever said it is a liar."

On January 22, 2007, he announced his retirement as head coach of the Cowboys after 4 years, apparently ending his coaching career.

Evidently, there are still questions as to his specific reasons for leaving the game. There were even reports that Parcells had been holding out for more money, and that Cowboys owner Jerry Jones simply did not think Parcells's performance was worth the money he was demanding for the upcoming season.

After retiring from coaching, Parcells became a studio analyst for ESPN. This was his fourth stint with ESPN, having worked there before accepting the job in Dallas, where he coached both the Dallas Cowboys and a little league team for charity. It was rumored that ESPN offered him a position on Monday Night Football, but Parcells declined the opportunity. (It is also worth noting that ESPN still held a contract with Parcells as a broadcaster even when he coached the Cowboys.)

=== Miami Dolphins ===
On December 19, 2007, the Miami Herald reported that Parcells had agreed to become the new executive vice president of football operations of the Miami Dolphins. ESPN reported the following day that he signed a four-year contract. Just a day prior, reports linking Parcells to the Atlanta Falcons' position of vice president of football operations were leaked. However, the following day the Falcons formally announced that Parcells had turned down the offer because of discussions with Miami.

In the first season as executive vice president of football operations, Parcells fired head coach Cam Cameron, general manager Randy Mueller, along with a few assistant coaches, after a 1–15 finish in the 2007 season. With vacancies at the general manager and head coaching spots, he brought in Jeff Ireland to be the general manager and signed Tony Sparano as head coach.

The new front office under Parcells then signed over 20 little-known players in the free-agent market.

In the 2008 draft, they drafted offensive tackle Jake Long with the No. 1 overall pick, along with Phillip Merling, Kendall Langford, Chad Henne, Lex Hilliard, and Donald Thomas. They also signed undrafted free agents Dan Carpenter and Davone Bess.

They also released fan favorite Zach Thomas, who would end up signing with the Dallas Cowboys, and traded star defensive end Jason Taylor to the Washington Redskins for a second-round pick in the 2009 draft.

The Dolphins then went on to sign quarterback Chad Pennington (drafted by Parcells in his Jets days), who was cut by the Jets to make room for Brett Favre.

The Dolphins finished the 2008 season 11–5 and became AFC East champions when Pennington and the Dolphins defeated Favre and the Jets in the final game of the season. They finished with a 10-game improvement from the previous season, making the Dolphins one of two teams in NFL history to accomplish a 10-game turnaround, the other being the 1999 Indianapolis Colts. It was also the first time since 2001 that the Dolphins made the playoffs. However, they were routed in the first round by the Baltimore Ravens, 27–9.

Parcells left the Dolphins in 2010.

=== Advisory role with the Cleveland Browns ===
On February 12, 2014, Parcells was reportedly interviewed by the Cleveland Browns in an executive capacity, but the two sides could not come to a deal. However, on March 6, 2014, Pro Football Hall of Fame executive Gil Brandt reported Parcells had met with Browns owner Jimmy Haslam as a courtesy consultant. Brandt made another tweet stating that Parcells met with Teddy Bridgewater for 4 1/2 hours, leading many to speculate his role with the Browns was as a draft consultant for the front office on the incoming quarterback class leading into the 2014 NFL draft. But when the media contacted the Browns directly, the team denied these rumors.

In an interview with The Plain Dealer, Jimmy Haslam squashed any rumor that Parcells would be joining the front office, saying, "...Bill's not going to come work for us, okay? I know that's what everyone's angling at, but there's other people that we talk to too who are knowledgeable in football that will share that too. Somehow the Parcells information just happened to hit the radar screen." Haslam also mentioned that his and Parcells's advisory relationship began in 2013 when Parcells gave some suggestions for their head coaching search.

Since 2014, Parcells has on occasion given advice to the Browns, such as in 2017 when Parcells gave his endorsement to hiring John Dorsey as their new general manager, and in 2018 when he was given the same role as in 2014 by consulting the Browns front office in searching for their next franchise quarterback in the 2018 NFL draft.

== Personal life ==
Parcells was married to Judith Goss from 1962 until their divorce in 2002. The couple, who married when both were still undergraduates at Wichita State, had three daughters, Suzy, Dallas, and Jill. Parcells's son-in-law through his daughter Dallas is football executive Scott Pioli, who won three Super Bowls as an executive with the New England Patriots.

== Head coaching record ==
=== College ===
Year	Team	Overall	Bowl/playoffs
Air Force Falcons (NCAA Division I-A independent) (1978)
1978	Air Force	3–8	
Air Force:		3–8	
Total:		3–8	

=== NFL ===
Team	Year	Regular season					Postseason			
Team	Year	Won	Lost	Ties	Win %	Finish	Won	Lost	Win %	Result
NYG	1983	3	12	1	.219	5th in NFC East	–	–	–	–
NYG	1984	9	7	0	.562	2nd in NFC East	1	1	.500	Lost to San Francisco 49ers in NFC Divisional Game
NYG	1985	10	6	0	.625	2nd in NFC East	1	1	.500	Lost to Chicago Bears in NFC Divisional Game
NYG	1986	14	2	0	.875	1st in NFC East	3	0	1.000	Super Bowl XXI Champions
NYG	1987	6	9	0	.400	5th in NFC East	–	–	–	–
NYG	1988	10	6	0	.625	2nd in NFC East	–	–	–	–
NYG	1989	12	4	0	.750	1st in NFC East	0	1	.000	Lost to Los Angeles Rams in NFC Divisional Game
NYG	1990	13	3	0	.812	1st in NFC East	3	0	1.000	Super Bowl XXV Champions
NYG Total		77	49	1	.611		8	3	.727	
NE	1993	5	11	0	.312	4th in AFC East	–	–	–	–
NE	1994	10	6	0	.625	2nd in AFC East	0	1	.000	Lost to Cleveland Browns in AFC Wild Card game
NE	1995	6	10	0	.375	4th in AFC East	–	–	–	–
NE	1996	11	5	0	.687	1st in AFC East	2	1	.667	Lost to Green Bay Packers in Super Bowl XXXI
NE Total		32	32	0	.500		2	2	.500	
NYJ	1997	9	7	0	.562	3rd in AFC East	–	–	–	–
NYJ	1998	12	4	0	.750	1st in AFC East	1	1	.500	Lost to Denver Broncos in AFC Championship Game
NYJ	1999	8	8	0	.500	4th in AFC East	–	–	–	–
NYJ Total		29	19	0	.604		1	1	.500	
DAL	2003	10	6	0	.625	2nd in NFC East	0	1	.000	Lost to Carolina Panthers in NFC Wild Card Game
DAL	2004	6	10	0	.375	3rd in NFC East	–	–	–	–
DAL	2005	9	7	0	.562	3rd in NFC East	–	–	–	–
DAL	2006	9	7	0	.562	2nd in NFC East	0	1	.000	Lost to Seattle Seahawks in NFC Wild Card Game
DAL Total		34	30	0	.531		0	2	.000	
Total		172	130	1	.569		11	8	.578	

== Coaching tree ==
Parcells has worked under eight head coaches:

- Dean Pryor: Hastings (1964)
- George Karras: Wichita State (1965)
- Tom Cahill: Army (1966–1969)
- Bill Peterson: Florida State (1970)
- Larry Jones: Florida State (1971–1972)
- Steve Sloan: Vanderbilt (1973–1974), Texas Tech (1975–1977)
- Ray Perkins: New York Giants (1979, 1981–1982)
- Ron Erhardt: New England Patriots (1980)

Seventeen of Parcells's coaching assistants became head coaches in the NFL or NCAA:

- Al Groh, Wake Forest University (1981–1986), New York Jets (2000), University of Virginia (2001–2009)
- Bill Belichick: Cleveland Browns (1991–1995), New England Patriots (2000–2023), University of North Carolina (2025–present)
- Ray Handley, New York Giants (1991–1992)
- Tom Coughlin, Jacksonville Jaguars (1995–2002), New York Giants (2004–2015)
- Walt Harris: Pittsburgh Panthers (1997–2004), Stanford University (2005–2006)
- Chris Palmer, Cleveland Browns (1999–2000)
- Romeo Crennel, Cleveland Browns (2005–2008), Kansas City Chiefs (2011, interim, 2012), Houston Texans (2020, interim)
- Eric Mangini, New York Jets (2006–2008), Cleveland Browns (2009–2010)
- Sean Payton: New Orleans Saints (2006–2021), Denver Broncos (2023–present)
- Tony Sparano, Miami Dolphins (2008–2011), Oakland Raiders (2014, interim)
- Charlie Weis, University of Notre Dame (2005–2009), University of Kansas (2012–2014)
- Todd Haley, Kansas City Chiefs (2009–2011)
- Mike MacIntyre, San Jose State University (2010–2012), University of Colorado (2013–2018), Florida International University (2022–present)
- Todd Bowles: Miami Dolphins (2011, interim), New York Jets (2015–2018), Tampa Bay Buccaneers (2022–present)
- Mike Zimmer: Minnesota Vikings (2014–2021)
- Anthony Lynn: Los Angeles Chargers (2017–2020)
- Freddie Kitchens: Cleveland Browns (2019)

Three of Parcells's former players became a head coach in the NFL or NCAA:

- Dan Campbell: Miami Dolphins (2015, interim), Detroit Lions (2021–present)
- Eddie George: Tennessee State (2021–2024), Bowling Green (2025–present)
- Aaron Glenn: New York Jets (2025–present)

Ten of Parcells's coaches/executives became general managers in the NFL:

- Bill Belichick: New England Patriots (2000–2024)
- Charley Armey: St. Louis Rams (2000–2005)
- Jerry Angelo: Chicago Bears (2001–2011)
- Mike Tannenbaum: New York Jets (2006–2012)
- Jeff Ireland: Miami Dolphins (2008–2013)
- Scott Pioli: Kansas City Chiefs (2009–2012)
- Trent Baalke: San Francisco 49ers (2011–2016), Jacksonville Jaguars (2020, interim, 2021–2024)
- Chris Grier: Miami Dolphins (2016–2025)
- Brian Gaine: Houston Texans (2018–2019)
- Joe Schoen: New York Giants (2022–present)

== See also ==
- History of the New York Giants (1979–1993)
- List of National Football League head coaches with 50 wins
