= Chuck Studley =

American football player and coach (born 1929)

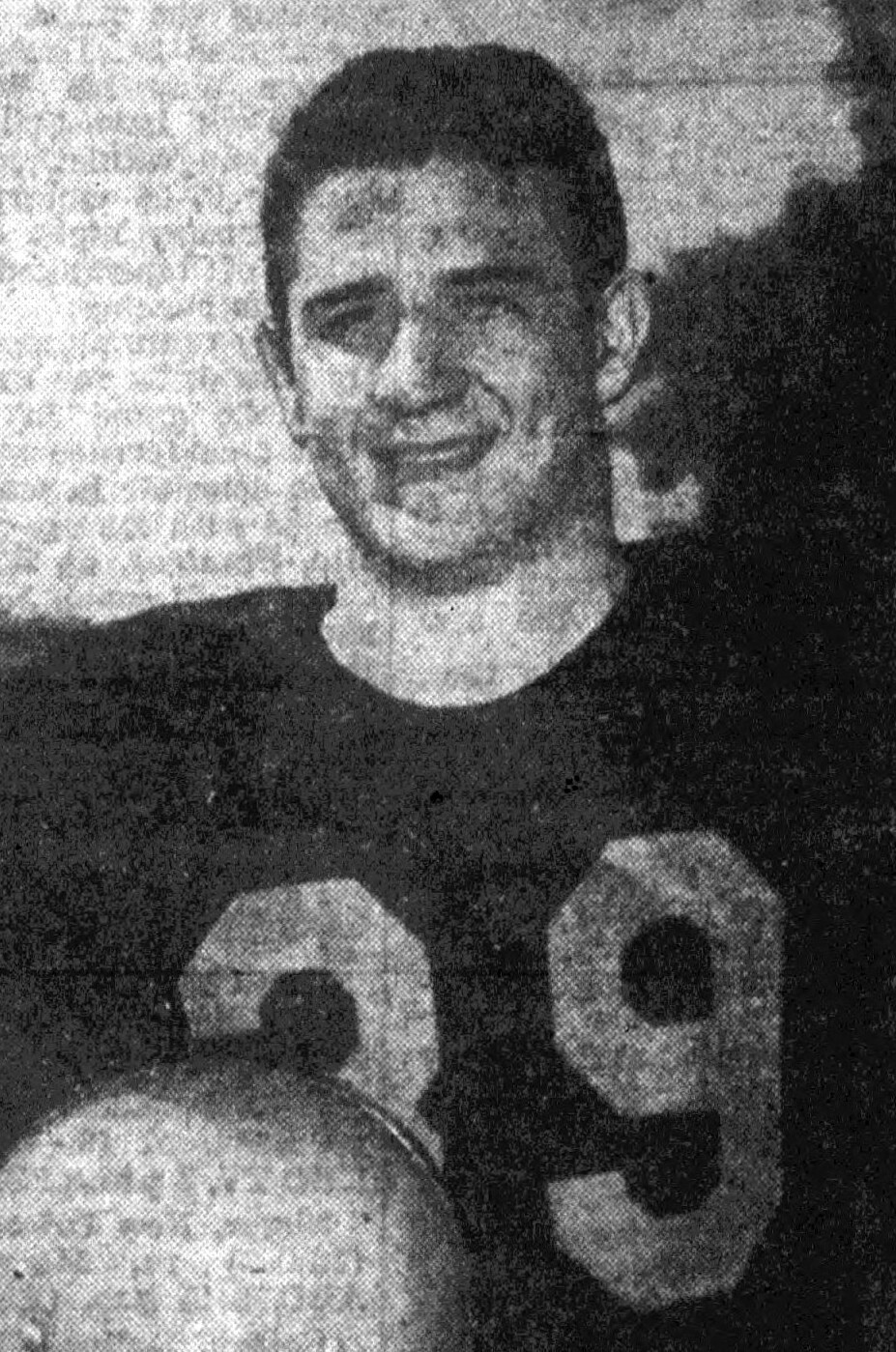
- Studley, circa 1951

Biographical details
- Born: January 17, 1929 (age 97); Maywood, Illinois, U.S.

Playing career
- 1949–1951: Illinois
- Position: Guard

Coaching career (HC unless noted)
- 1952–1954: Alton HS (IL)
- 1955–1959: Illinois (line)
- 1960: UMass
- 1961–1966: Cincinnati
- 1969–1978: Cincinnati Bengals (DL)
- 1979–1982: San Francisco 49ers (DC)
- 1983: Houston Oilers (DC)
- 1983: Houston Oilers (interim)
- 1984–1986: Miami Dolphins (DC)
- 1987–1988: Miami Dolphins (LB)
- 1989–1991: Cincinnati Bengals (DL)

Head coaching record
- Overall: 34–35 (college); 2–8 (NFL)

Accomplishments and honors

Championships
- 1 Yankee (1960); 2 MVC (1963–1964)

Awards
- First-team All-Big Ten (1951); Missouri Valley Coach of the Year (1964)

Charles B. Studley (born January 17, 1929) is an American former football coach. He served as head coach at University of Cincinnati from 1961 to 1966 and interim head coach of the Houston Oilers in 1983. Studley finished with a 2–8 record in his only job as an NFL head coach.

Prior to joining the Oilers as a defensive coordinator in 1983, Studley served as defensive coordinator with the San Francisco 49ers. He was in charge of the defense under Bill Walsh and was responsible for the 49ers being able to hold off the Cincinnati Bengals' rally in Super Bowl XVI. Studley subsequently served from 1984 to 1986 as defensive coordinator with the Miami Dolphins. Following a tenure as the Dolphins' linebackers coach, he joined the Cincinnati Bengals from 1989 to 1991 as a defensive line coach.

Studley played guard on the 1952 Rose Bowl team at the University of Illinois at Urbana–Champaign.

Studley now resides with his family in Cincinnati, Ohio.

== Head coaching record ==
=== College ===
Year	Team	Overall	Conference	Standing	Bowl/playoffs
UMass Redmen (Yankee Conference) (1960)
1960	UMass	7–2	3–1	T–1st	
UMass:		7–2	3–1		
Cincinnati Bearcats (Missouri Valley Conference) (1961–1966)
1961	Cincinnati	3–7	1–2	3rd	
1962	Cincinnati	2–8	1–2	3rd	
1963	Cincinnati	6–4	3–1	T–1st	
1964	Cincinnati	8–2	4–0	1st	
1965	Cincinnati	5–5	2–2	3rd	
1966	Cincinnati	3–7	2–2	3rd	
Cincinnati:		27–33	13–9		
Total:		34–35			
National championship Conference title Conference division title or championship game berth

=== NFL ===
Team	Year	Regular Season					Postseason			
Team	Year	Won	Lost	Ties	Win %	Finish	Won	Lost	Win %	Result
HOI	1983	2	8	0	.200	4th in AFC Central	–	–	–	–
HOI Total		2	8	0	.200		–	–	–	
Total		2	8	0	.200					
