= George Karras =

American football player, coach, scout, and executive

Biographical details
- Born: 1928 or 1929 (age 96–97)
- Died: March 5, 2017

Playing career
- 1953–1955: Villanova
- Position: Guard

Coaching career (HC unless noted)
- 1960–1962: Villanova (line)
- 1963: Wichita State (DL)
- 1964: UMass (defensive assistant)
- 1965–1966: Wichita State
- 1967: UMass (line)
- 1971–1979: Harvard (assistant)

Administrative career (AD unless noted)
- 1983–1986: Denver Broncos (scout)
- 1987–1997: Los Angeles Raiders (dir. pro pers.)

Head coaching record
- Overall: 4–15

George Karras (c. 1929 – March 5, 2017) was an American football player, coach, scout, and executive. He served as the head football coach at Wichita State University from 1965 to 1966, compiling a record of 4–15. Karras gave Bill Parcells his first full-time coaching job while he was the Wichita State head coach. He left Wichita in 1966 to be the line coach at the University of Massachusetts Amherst. He had previously been the defensive coach there before coming to Wichita in 1964. Karras played college football as a guard at Villanova University from 1953 to 1955. Karras attended high school in Etna, Pennsylvania. He later worked for the United Scouting Combine and as the chief scout in the Northeastern United States for the Denver Broncos of the National Football League (NFL). In 1987, he was named the director of pro personnel for the NFL's Los Angeles Raiders. Karras died on March 5, 2017.

== Head coaching record ==
Year	Team	Overall	Conference	Standing	Bowl/playoffs
Wichita State Shockers (Missouri Valley Conference) (1965–1966)
1965	Wichita State	2–7	0–4	6th	
1966	Wichita State	2–8	1–3	T–4th	
Wichita State:		4–15	1–7		
Total:		4–15			
