= 1966 North Texas State Mean Green football team =

American college football season

1966 North Texas State Mean Green football

MVC co-champion
- Conference: Missouri Valley Conference
- Record: 8–2 (3–1 MVC)
- Head coach: Odus Mitchell (21st season)
- Home stadium: Fouts Field

1966 Missouri Valley Conference football standings
	Conf.					Overall
Team	W		L		T	W		L		T
North Texas State +	3	–	1	–	0	8	–	2	–	0
Tulsa +	3	–	1	–	0	6	–	4	–	0
Cincinnati	2	–	2	–	0	3	–	7	–	0
Louisville	1	–	3	–	0	6	–	4	–	0
Wichita State	1	–	3	–	0	2	–	8	–	0
+ – Conference co-champions

The 1966 North Texas State Mean Green football team was an American football team that represented North Texas State University (now known as the University of North Texas) during the 1966 NCAA University Division football season as a member of the Missouri Valley Conference. In their 21st year under head coach Odus Mitchell, the team compiled an 8–2 record and finished as Missouri Valley Conference co-champion.

== Schedule ==
Date	Opponent	Site	Result	Attendance	Source
September 17	New Mexico State*	Fouts Field; Denton, TX	W 25–21	6,000	
September 24	Texas Western*	Fouts Field; Denton, TX	W 12–9	10,500	
October 1	at Louisville	Fairgrounds Stadium; Louisville, KY	W 20–19	9,500–10,000	
October 8	Tampa*	Fouts Field; Denton, TX	W 41–6	10,000	
October 15	at Tulsa	Skelly Field; Tulsa, OK	L 27–30	25,400	
October 22	Southern Illinois*	Fouts Field; Denton, TX	W 53–6	9,000	
October 29	at Drake*	Drake Stadium; Des Moines, IA	L 13–17	9,100	
November 5	Cincinnati^{†}	Fouts Field; Denton, TX	W 35–13	16,800	
November 12	at Wichita State	Veterans Field; Wichita, KS	W 30–13	5,444	
November 19	Chattanooga*	Fouts Field; Denton, TX	W 42–7	7,000	
*Non-conference game; ^{†}Homecoming
