= Frank Camp =

American football player and coach (1905–1986)

Biographical details
- Born: December 23, 1905; Trenton, Kentucky, U.S.
- Died: January 26, 1986 (aged 80); Louisville, Kentucky, U.S.

Playing career
- c. 1929: Transylvania
- Position: Quarterback

Coaching career (HC unless noted)
- 1946–1968: Louisville

Administrative career (AD unless noted)
- 1969–1975: Louisville (assistant AD)

Head coaching record
- Overall: 118–95–2 (college)
- Bowls: 1–0

Accomplishments and honors

Championships
- 1 KIAC (1947)

Edward Franklin Camp Jr. (December 23, 1905 – January 26, 1986) was an American football player and coach. He served as the head coach at the University of Louisville from 1946 to 1968, compiling a record of 118–95–2 (.551). He is credited as the man who brought back Louisville football following a three-year absence caused by World War II, and has the most wins of any head coach in school history. Pro Football Hall of Fame quarterback Johnny Unitas was among the players Camp coached. In 1947, Louisville had a 7–0–1 season.

Camp was born on December 23, 1905, on Trenton, Kentucky. He graduated from Transylvania University, where he played football as a quarterback, in 1930. He starting his coaching career at the high school level, working in Hodgenville, Glasgow, and Henderson, Kentucky.

== Head coaching record ==
=== College ===
Year	Team	Overall	Conference	Standing	Bowl/playoffs
Louisville Cardinals (Kentucky Intercollegiate Athletic Conference) (1946–1947)
1946	Louisville	6–2	2–2	4th	
1947	Louisville	7–0–1	2–0	T–1st	
Louisville Cardinals (Ohio Valley Conference) (1948–1949)
1948	Louisville	5–5	1–1	T–3rd	
1949	Louisville	8–3	3–0	2nd	
Louisville Cardinals (NCAA University Division independent) (1950–1962)
1950	Louisville	3–6–1			
1951	Louisville	5–4			
1952	Louisville	3–5			
1953	Louisville	1–7			
1954	Louisville	3–6			
1955	Louisville	7–2			
1956	Louisville	6–3			
1957	Louisville	9–1			W Sun
1958	Louisville	4–4			
1959	Louisville	6–4			
1960	Louisville	7–2			
1961	Louisville	6–3			
1962	Louisville	6–4			
Louisville Cardinals (Missouri Valley Conference) (1963–1968)
1963	Louisville	3–7	1–3	5th	
1964	Louisville	1–9	0–4	5th	
1965	Louisville	6–4	3–1	2nd	
1966	Louisville	6–4	1–3	T–4th	
1967	Louisville	5–5	1–3	4th	
1968	Louisville	5–5	2–3	T–4th	
Louisville:		118–95–2	16–20		
Total:		118–95–2			
National championship Conference title Conference division title or championship game berth
