= 1966 Louisville Cardinals football team =

American college football season

1966 Louisville Cardinals football
- Conference: Missouri Valley Conference
- Record: 6–4 (1–3 MVC)
- Head coach: Frank Camp (21st season)
- Home stadium: Fairgrounds Stadium

1966 Missouri Valley Conference football standings
	Conf.					Overall
Team	W		L		T	W		L		T
North Texas State +	3	–	1	–	0	8	–	2	–	0
Tulsa +	3	–	1	–	0	6	–	4	–	0
Cincinnati	2	–	2	–	0	3	–	7	–	0
Louisville	1	–	3	–	0	6	–	4	–	0
Wichita State	1	–	3	–	0	2	–	8	–	0
+ – Conference co-champions

The 1966 Louisville Cardinals football team was an American football team that represented the University of Louisville in the Missouri Valley Conference (MVC) during the 1966 NCAA University Division football season. In their 21st season under head coach Frank Camp, the Cardinals compiled a 6–4 record (1–3 against conference opponents) and outscored opponents by a total of 231 to 159.

The team's statistical leaders included Benny Russell with 2,016 passing yards, Jim Stallings with 350 rushing yards, Jim Zamberlan with 747 receiving yards, and Mike Dennis with 30 points scored.

== Schedule ==
Date	Opponent	Site	Result	Attendance	Source
September 24	at Southern Illinois*	McAndrew Stadium; Carbondale, IL	W 16–7	10,000–10,500	
October 1	North Texas State	Fairgrounds Stadium; Louisville, KY	L 19–20	9,500–10,000	
October 8	at Dayton*	Baujan Field; Dayton, OH	L 17–20		
October 15	Drake*	Fairgrounds Stadium; Louisville, KY	W 66–26	8,000	
October 22	at Marshall*	Fairfield Stadium; Huntington, WV	W 35–15	10,000	
October 29	at Wichita State	Veterans Field; Wichita, KS	L 2–9	7,133	
November 5	Kent State*	Fairgrounds Stadium; Louisville, KY	W 23–20	5,000	
November 12	at Cincinnati	Nippert Stadium; Cincinnati, OH (rivalry)	L 3–17	10,000	
November 19	Tulsa	Fairgrounds Stadium; Louisville, KY	W 29–18	3,500	
November 26	East Carolina*	Fairgrounds Stadium; Louisville, KY	W 21–7	3,500–4,500	
*Non-conference game
