= 1956 North Texas State Eagles football team =

American college football season

1956 North Texas State Eagles football

GCC co-champion
- Conference: Gulf Coast Conference
- Record: 7–2–1 (2–0–1 GCC)
- Head coach: Odus Mitchell (11th season)
- Home stadium: Fouts Field

1956 Gulf Coast Conference football standings
	Conf.					Overall
Team	W		L		T	W		L		T
North Texas State +	2	–	0	–	1	7	–	2	–	1
Trinity (TX) +	2	–	0	–	1	5	–	3	–	1
Abilene Christian	1	–	2	–	0	4	–	6	–	0
Midwestern (TX)	0	–	3	–	0	3	–	7	–	0
+ – Conference co-champions

The 1956 North Texas State Eagles football team was an American football team that represented North Texas State College (now known as the University of North Texas) during the 1956 college football season as a member of the Gulf Coast Conference. In their 11th year under head coach Odus Mitchell, the team compiled a 7–2–1 record.

== Schedule ==
Date	Opponent	Site	Result	Attendance	Source
September 22	at No. 13 Ole Miss*	Hemingway Stadium; Oxford, MS	L 0–45	7,000	
September 29	at Arizona State*	Goodwin Stadium; Tempe, AZ	L 7–27	16,000	
October 6	San Diego Marines*	Fouts Field; Denton, TX	W 65–6		
October 13	at Midwestern (TX)	Wichita Falls, TX	W 14–7		
October 20	Texas Western*	Fouts Field; Denton, TX	W 13–6		
October 26	at Youngstown State*	Rayen Stadium; Youngstown, OH	W 19–12		
November 3	Trinity (TX)^{†}	Fouts Field; Denton, TX	T 7–7		
November 10	McMurry*	Fouts Field; Denton, TX	W 23–7		
November 17	Abilene Christian	Fouts Field; Denton, TX	W 20–7		
November 22	at Chattanooga*	Chamberlain Field; Chattanooga, TN	W 20–7		
*Non-conference game; ^{†}Homecoming; Rankings from AP Poll released prior to the game
