= 1966 Tulsa Golden Hurricane football team =

American college football season

1966 Tulsa Golden Hurricane football

MVC co-champion
- Conference: Missouri Valley Conference
- Record: 6–4 (3–1 MVC)
- Head coach: Glenn Dobbs (6th season)
- Home stadium: Skelly Stadium

1966 Missouri Valley Conference football standings
	Conf.					Overall
Team	W		L		T	W		L		T
North Texas State +	3	–	1	–	0	8	–	2	–	0
Tulsa +	3	–	1	–	0	6	–	4	–	0
Cincinnati	2	–	2	–	0	3	–	7	–	0
Louisville	1	–	3	–	0	6	–	4	–	0
Wichita State	1	–	3	–	0	2	–	8	–	0
+ – Conference co-champions

The 1966 Tulsa Golden Hurricane football team represented the University of Tulsa during the 1966 NCAA University Division football season. In their sixth year under head coach Glenn Dobbs, the Golden Hurricane compiled a 6–4 record, 3–1 against conference opponents, and finished tied for first place in the Missouri Valley Conference.

The team's statistical leaders included Greg Barton with 1,673 passing yards, Gene Lakusiak with 330 rushing yards, and Neal Sweeney with 740 receiving yards.

== Schedule ==
Date	Opponent	Site	Result	Attendance	Source
September 17	Tampa*	Skelly Stadium; Tulsa, OK	W 57–11	25,500	
September 24	at No. 6 Arkansas*	Razorback Stadium; Fayetteville, AR	L 8–27	41,000	
October 8	at Colorado State*	Colorado Field; Fort Collins, CO	W 20–6	14,300	
October 15	North Texas State	Skelly Stadium; Tulsa, OK	W 30–27	25,400	
October 22	at Memphis State*	Memphis Memorial Stadium; Memphis, TN	L 0–6	27,604	
October 29	at Cincinnati	Nippert Stadium; Cincinnati, OH	W 13–0	18,000	
November 5	at Houston*	Houston Astrodome; Houston, TX	L 14–73	42,061	
November 12	No. 3 (small) Montana State*^{†}	Skelly Stadium; Tulsa, OK	W 13–10	24,055	
November 19	at Louisville	Fairgrounds Stadium; Louisville, KY	L 18–29	3,500	
November 24	Wichita State	Skelly Stadium; Tulsa, OK	W 47–14	14,500	
*Non-conference game; ^{†}Homecoming; Rankings from AP Poll released prior to the game

== After the season ==
=== 1967 NFL/AFL draft ===
The following Golden Hurricane players were selected in the 1967 NFL/AFL draft following the season.

Round	Pick	Player	Position	Club
6	135	Don Bandy	Guard	Washington Redskins (NFL)
6	139	Neal Sweeney	Wide receiver	Denver Broncos (AFL)
7	170	Milt Jackson	Defensive back	San Francisco 49ers (NFL)
13	323	Charley Hardt	Defensive back	Minnesota Vikings (NFL)
