= 1965 Cincinnati Bearcats football team =

American college football season

1965 Cincinnati Bearcats football
- Conference: Missouri Valley Conference
- Record: 5–5 (2–2 MVC)
- Head coach: Chuck Studley (5th season)
- Captain: Dick Fugere
- Home stadium: Nippert Stadium

1965 Missouri Valley Conference football standings
| | Conf. | | | | | Overall |
| Team | W | | L | | T | W | | L | | T |
|---|---|---|---|---|---|---|---|---|---|---|
| Tulsa $ | 4 | – | 0 | – | 0 | 8 | – | 3 | – | 0 |
| Louisville | 2 | – | 1 | – | 0 | 6 | – | 4 | – | 0 |
| North Texas State | 2 | – | 2 | – | 0 | 3 | – | 7 | – | 0 |
| Cincinnati | 1 | – | 2 | – | 0 | 5 | – | 5 | – | 0 |
| Wichita State | 0 | – | 4 | – | 0 | 2 | – | 7 | – | 0 |
$ – Conference champion

The 1965 Cincinnati Bearcats football team represented University of Cincinnati as a member of the Missouri Valley Conference (MVC) during the 1965 NCAA University Division football season. Led by fifth-year head coachChuck Studley, the Bearcats compiled an overall record of 5–5 with a mark of 2–2 in conference play, placing third in the MVC. The team played home games at Nippert Stadium in Cincinnati.

== Schedule ==
| Date | Opponent | Site | Result | Attendance | Source |
|---|---|---|---|---|---|
| September 18 | Dayton* | Nippert Stadium; Cincinnati, OH | W 28–0 | 18,000 | |
| September 24 | at Houston* | Houston Astrodome; Houston, TX | L 6–21 | 27,576 | |
| October 2 | Wichita State | Nippert Stadium; Cincinnati, OH | W 14–6 | 10,000 | |
| October 9 | Xavier* | Nippert Stadium; Cincinnati, OH (rivalry) | L 3–14 | 26,000 | |
| October 15 | at George Washington* | District of Columbia Stadium; Washington, DC | W 13–3 | 10,000 | |
| October 23 | at Tulsa | Skelly Stadium; Tulsa, OK | L 6–49 | 24,867 | |
| October 30 | North Texas State | Nippert Stadium; Cincinnati, OH | L 24–28 | 12,000 | |
| November 6 | at Kansas State* | Memorial Stadium; Manhattan, KS | W 21–14 | 11,000 | |
| November 13 | South Dakota* | Nippert Stadium; Cincinnati, OH | W 41–0 | 12,000 | |
| November 20 | Miami (OH)* | Nippert Stadium; Cincinnati, OH (Victory Bell) | L 7–37 | 17,000 | |
*Non-conference game
