= J. W. Pender =

American football coach and professor

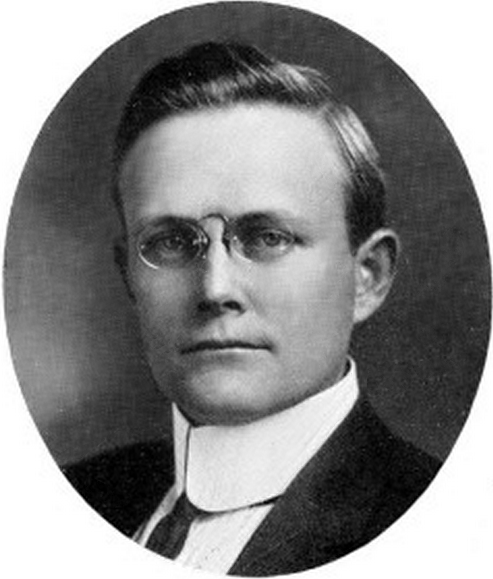
- Pender pictured in The Yucca 1914, North Texas State Normal yearbook

Biographical details
- Born: October 15, 1875; Texas, U.S.
- Died: February 12, 1969 (aged 93); Denton, Texas, U.S.
- Education: Baylor University

Coaching career (HC unless noted)
- 1913–1914: North Texas State Normal

Joseph William "Dad" Pender (October 15, 1875 – February 12, 1969) was an American football coach and university professor. He served as the first ever head football coach at North Texas State Normal College, now the University of North Texas, from 1913 to 1914, compiling a 3–4 record. Pender joined the North Texas faculty in 1912, and served for many years in a wide range of posts such as athletics and government. He died in 1969 from a stroke.

== Head coaching record ==
| Year | Team | Overall | Conference | Standing | Bowl/playoffs |
|---|---|---|---|---|---|
North Texas State Normal (Independent) (1913–1914)
| 1913 | North Texas State Normal | 0–1 | | | |
| 1914 | North Texas State Normal | 3–3 | | | |
| North Texas State Normal: | | 3–4 | | | |
| Total: | | 3–4 | | | |
