= 1959 Sun Bowl =

American college football game

| New Mexico State Aggies | North Texas State Eagles |
| (7–3) | (9–1) |
| Border Conference | Missouri Valley |
| 28 | 8 |
| Head coach: Warren B. Woodson | Head coach: Odus Mitchell |
| | 1 | 2 | 3 | 4 | Total |
|---|---|---|---|---|---|
| New Mexico State | 14 | 7 | 7 | 0 | 28 |
| North Texas State | 0 | 0 | 8 | 0 | 8 |
- Date: December 31, 1959
- Season: 1959
- Stadium: Kidd Field
- Location: El Paso, Texas
- Referee: Curly Hays (Border; split crew: Border, Missouri Valley)
- Attendance: 14,000

The 1959 Sun Bowl featured the New Mexico State Aggies and the North Texas State Eagles.

== Background ==
New Mexico State represented the Border Intercollegiate Athletic Association (BAAA) and finished tied for third in Warren B. Woodson's second season as head coach for the Aggies. North Texas State was co-champion of the Missouri Valley Conference with Houston in Odus Mitchell's 14th year. This was the Eagles first bowl game since the 1948 Salad Bowl.

== Game summary ==
- New Mexico State - Atkins 57 yard touchdown pass from Johnson (Gaiters run), 14:20 remaining
- New Mexico State - Locklin fumble recovery (run failed), :01 remaining
- New Mexico State - B. Kelly 15 yard touchdown pass from Johnson (Villanueva kick), 4:05 remaining
- New Mexico State - Gaiters 44 yard touchdown run (Villanueva kick), 13:50 remaining
- North Texas State - Christie 51 punt return (Perkins pass from Duty),:01 remaining

Charley Johnson was named Sun Bowl MVP, going 7–of-15 with 124 yards passing and two touchdowns along with 31 yards rushing. Billy Ray Locklin had a defensive touchdown for the Aggies when he recovered a fumble as they led 21–0 at halftime. The Eagles could only muster a second half touchdown by Billy Christle and even though Abner Haynes had 174 all purpose yards, Bob Gaiters put the game out of reach with his 44 yard touchdown.

| Statistics | New Mexico State | North Texas State |
|---|---|---|
| First downs | 18 | 20 |
| Yards rushing | 206 | 152 |
| Yards passing | 136 | 182 |
| Total yards | 342 | 334 |
| Passing (C-A-I) | 8-16-0 | 15-31-2 |
| Penalties-Yards | 8-69 | 5-35 |
| Fumbles-Lost | 4-2 | 8-6 |

== Aftermath ==
New Mexico State returned to the Sun Bowl the following season after winning the BIAA once again. Mitchell coached the Eagles for seven more years and won the conference title twice. The program did not reach another bowl game until the 2001 New Orleans Bowl, 42 years later.
