= Optimist Bowl =

1946 American college football game

The Optimist Bowl was a postseason college football bowl game played in 1946. It was held at Public School Stadium (later known as Robertson Stadium), in Houston.

== Origins ==
The game was sponsored by the Houston Optimist Club, through agreement reached with the Lone Star Conference in April 1946; the game was to be contested annually for five years, matching the conference champion against a nationally-rated team. Proceeds from the game would be used to benefit homeless boys in Texas. The 1946 conference champion was North Texas State (now the University of North Texas) coached by Odus Mitchell, and organizers extended an invitation to coach Amos Alonzo Stagg and his College of the Pacific team (now the University of the Pacific), who accepted. It was the last game of Stagg's incredible 57-year college football coaching career.

== Game results ==
Season	Date	Winner		Loser		Attendance (est.)
1946	December 21, 1946	North Texas	14	Pacific	13	5,000

The game itself went right down to the wire. With 2:40 to go in the fourth quarter, Pacific quarterback Bud Klein broke a 7-7 tie with a 22-yard strike to Bob Heck. But the extra point failed, which turned out to be the difference in the game: North Texas QB Billy Dinkle then drove his team down the field, and with just nine seconds left, fired a nine-yard touchdown pass to Louis Rienzi. Dinkle himself booted the extra point, and the Eagles won their first-ever bowl game.

Although the Optimist Bowl was originally planned to be played annually through at least 1950, a poor crowd of about 5,000 ensured the game would not be played again. Like some other postseason match-ups of the era, such as the Grape Bowl and the Glass Bowl, results are listed in NCAA records, but the games were not considered NCAA-sanctioned bowls.

=== 1946: North Texas 14, Pacific 13 ===
Scoring summary

Quarter	Time	Drive			Team	Scoring information	Score	
Quarter	Time	Plays	Yards	TOP	Team	Scoring information	COP	NTS
2					NTS	Interception returned 58 yards for touchdown by Ned McNeil, Billy Dinkle kick good	0	7
3			24		COP	John Rohde 5-yard touchdown reception from Bruce Orvis, Ed Waits kick good	7	7
4	2:40		28		COP	Bob Heck 22-yard touchdown reception from Bud Klein, Ed Waits kick no good	13	7
4	0:09	10	67		NTS	Louis Rienzi 9-yard touchdown reception from Billy Dinkle, Billy Dinkle kick good	13	14
"TOP" = time of possession. For other American football terms, see Glossary of American football.							13	14

== See also ==
- List of college bowl games
