= 1951 North Texas State Eagles football team =

American college football season

1951 North Texas State Eagles football

GCC champion
- Conference: Gulf Coast Conference
- Record: 8–4 (2–0 GCC)
- Head coach: Odus Mitchell (6th season)
- Home stadium: Eagle Field

1951 Gulf Coast Conference football standings
| | Conf. | | | | | Overall |
| Team | W | | L | | T | W | | L | | T |
|---|---|---|---|---|---|---|---|---|---|---|
| North Texas State $ | 2 | – | 0 | – | 0 | 8 | – | 4 | – | 0 |
| Midwestern (TX) | 0 | – | 1 | – | 1 | 5 | – | 4 | – | 1 |
| Trinity (TX) | 0 | – | 1 | – | 1 | 4 | – | 5 | – | 1 |
$ – Conference champion

The 1951 North Texas State Eagles football team was an American football team that represented North Texas State College (now known as the University of North Texas) during the 1951 college football season as a member of the Gulf Coast Conference. In their sixth year under head coach Odus Mitchell, the team compiled a 8–4 record. The team was ranked at No. 70 in the 1951 Litkenhous Ratings.

== Schedule ==
| Date | Opponent | Site | Result | Attendance | Source |
|---|---|---|---|---|---|
| September 15 | at Lamar Tech* | Beaumont, TX | W 54–6 | 5,400 | |
| September 22 | at Texas Western* | Kidd Field; El Paso, TX | W 33–0 | 11,000 | |
| September 29 | at Sul Ross* | Jackson Field; Alpine, TX | W 62–6 | | |
| October 5 | East Texas State* | Eagle Field; Denton, TX | W 48–7 | 7,500 | |
| October 12 | at West Texas State* | Amarillo Stadium; Amarillo, TX | W 42–14 | 3,000 | |
| October 19 | Carswell Air Force Base* | Eagle Field; Denton, TX | L 6–13 | | |
| October 27 | at Pacific (CA)* | Pacific Memorial Stadium; Stockton, CA | L 0–34 | 13,100 | |
| November 3 | at Trinity (TX) | Alamo Stadium; San Antonio, TX | W 32–0 | | |
| November 10 | Midwestern (TX)^{†} | Eagle Field; Denton, TX | W 61–0 | | |
| November 17 | Fresno State* | Eagle Field; Denton, TX | W 62–0 | 5,000 | |
| November 22 | at Chattanooga* | Chamberlain Field; Chattanooga, TN | L 20–32 | 10,000 | |
| November 30 | Houston* | Eagle Field; Denton, TX | L 14–20 | | |
*Non-conference game; ^{†}Homecoming
