= John Eckman =

- Eckman in 1965

Profile
- Position: Quarterback

Personal information
- Born: 1946 (age 79–80)

Career information
- High school: Wall (Wall Township, New Jersey)
- College: Wichita State (1965–1967)

Career history
- Atlanta Falcons (1968)*; Lowell Giants (1968); Hamilton Tiger-Cats (1969–1970)
- * Offseason or practice squad member only

John Eckman (born 1946) is an American former gridiron football quarterback. He played college football for the Wichita State Shockers from 1965 to 1967. He played professionally for the Hamilton Tiger-Cats of the Canadian Football League from 1969 to 1970.

== Early life ==
John Eckman was born in 1946. He attended Wall High School in Wall Township, New Jersey.

== College career ==
Eckman played college football for the Wichita State Shockers from 1965 to 1967. He appeared in nine games as a sophomore in 1965, completing 41 passes for 518 yards. As a junior in 1966, he ranked second in the country with 2,339 passing yards and also set an NCAA record with 37 interceptions. He also led the country in pass completions (195), pass attempts (458), and total plays (539), and ranked second in yards gained per game (233.9) and fifth in total yards (2,174). He missed much of the 1967 season with a knee injury.

== Professional career ==
After going undrafted in the 1968 NFL/AFL draft, Eckman signed with the NFL's Atlanta Falcons in February 1968. He was released on July 31, 1968, during training camp.

Eckman played for the Lowell Giants of the Atlantic Coast Football League in 1968, scoring three passing touchdowns and one rushing touchdown.

Eckman dressed in all 28 games for the Hamilton Tiger-Cats of the Canadian Football League from 1969 to 1970, completing 124 of 238 passes (52.1%) for 1,908, 10 touchdowns, and 26 interceptions while also rushing 44 times for 224 yards and two touchdowns.
