= North Texas Mean Green football =

College football team for the University of North Texas

2026 North Texas Mean Green football team
- First season: 1913; 113 years ago
- Head coach: Neal Brown; 1st season, 6–2 (.750)
- Location: Denton, Texas
- Stadium: DATCU Stadium (capacity: 30,850)
- NCAA division: Division I FBS
- Conference: The American
- Colors: Green and white
- All-time record: 558–549–33 (.504)
- Bowl record: 4–12 (.250)

Conference championships
- TIAA: 1931 LSC: 1935, 1936, 1939, 1940, 1941, 1946, 1947 GCC: 1950, 1951, 1952, 1955, 1956 MVC: 1958, 1959, 1966, 1967, 1973 Southland: 1983, 1994 SBC: 2001, 2002, 2003, 2004

Division championships
- CUSA West: 2017
- Consensus All-Americans: 2
- Rivalries: Rice; SMU (rivalry); UTSA

Uniforms
- Fight song: UNT Fight Song
- Mascot: Scrappy
- Marching band: Green Brigade Marching Band
- Website: meangreensports.com/football

The North Texas Mean Green football program is the intercollegiate team that represents the University of North Texas in the sport of American football. The Mean Green compete in the Football Bowl Subdivision (FBS) of the National Collegiate Athletic Association (NCAA) and the American Conference. North Texas has produced 24 conference championship titles, with fifteen postseason bowl appearances and four appearances in the former I-AA (now Football Championship Series) Playoffs. The Mean Green play their home games at DATCU Stadium which has a seating capacity of 30,850.

== History ==
=== Early history ===
Before even becoming a fully-fledged state-recognized institution, the University of North Texas (then known as North Texas State Normal College) fielded its first football team in 1913. Under the direction of Professor J. W. Pender, the band of teachers-in-training played one game against TCU, a 13–0 loss at Eagle Field (located on the current site of Willis Library).

The next year saw North Texas assemble its first full schedule, with three home and three away games, against schools such as TCU and Sam Houston State. The Eagles picked up their first win in school history on the road against now-defunct Burleson College, a 25–0 shutout. They'd pick up their first home win a week later, beating the University of Dallas 13–2.

After Pender left the university in 1915, basketball coach James W. St. Clair took over the football program, coaching both teams and leading North Texas to a 20–11–2 record in his five years. St. Clair's final season saw the Eagles pick up their first win over a future major college program, beating TCU 14–6 in Fort Worth to open the 1919 campaign.

As the university itself worked its way towards full recognition by the Texas State Legislature in 1921, the school began making moves to improve its young football program. The university hired Theron J. Fouts in 1920, and joined the Texas Intercollegiate Athletic Association in 1922. The jump in prestige allowed the school to schedule games against some of the conferences former members, including SMU and Baylor, who had moved from the TIAA to the Southwest Conference just a few years prior. The Eagles' first year in the TIAA saw them open up the season with a 55–0 loss to Baylor in Denton, also marked the first game in the history of the Safeway Bowl with rival SMU, with North Texas falling to the Mustangs 66–0.

The next few seasons saw average performances on the field. In 1929, the university hired Jack Sisco to coach the program. Sisco lead the team through some of its first years as a consistently-winning college football unit. The program won its first conference title in 1931 as members of the TIAA. In 1932, North Texas became a charter member of the new Lone Star Conference, compiling an 8–1–1 record, winning eight straight games after a 0–1–1 start, six of them via a shutout while allowing just 12 points against in that span. Sisco's tenure continued with conference championships in 1935, 1936, and a three-peat from 1939–-1941. Sisco was replaced by Lloyd Russell in 1942, who would only spend one season at the helm before the school temporarily disbanded its football program from 1943 to 1945 as many students went off to fight in World War II.

=== Odus Mitchell era (1946–1966) ===
The revival of the program after the war turned out to be one of the most successful stretches in school history. North Texas hired Odus Mitchell from Marshall High School to lead the team. In his first season, the Eagles went 7–3–1, winning the Lone Star Conference Championship and earning a bid to the team's first ever bowl game and victory, a 14–13 win over Pacific in the 1946 Optimist Bowl. The year was the first of seven consecutive winning seasons, which remains a school record. In his 21 years as head coach, Mitchell compiled 122 wins, and 10 conference titles, all of which still stand as school records for a single coach. Mitchell also coached North Texas to their first AP Ranking in school history (No. 16 during the 1959 season), and oversaw the transition from Eagle Field to Fouts Field in 1952 (North Texas won its first game 55–0 at the new stadium over North Dakota). He also recruited Abner Haynes and Leon King to North Texas in 1956, where the pair eventually broke the color barrier for college football in the state of Texas the next season. His second to last recruiting class in 1965 included future NFL Hall of Famer Joe Greene, who went on to become the only All-American in North Texas football history, and a four-time Super Bowl champion with the Pittsburgh Steelers.

=== Hayden Fry era (1973–1978) ===
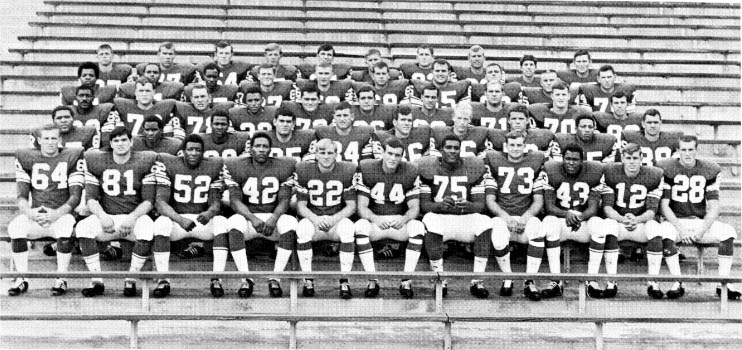
The 1968 North Texas team

After Mitchell left in early 1967, North Texas had just one conference title and three winning seasons over the next six years. In 1973, the Mean Green hired future Hall of Fame coach Hayden Fry, who had been controversially fired by rival SMU the previous season after leading the Mustangs one game shy of a Southwest Conference title. Fry's Mean Green unit won the Missouri Valley Conference in his first year despite putting up a 5–5–1 season. After a lackluster 2–7–2 finish in 1974, Fry, dissatisfied with the lack of support from students, alumni, and fans, began putting together a plan with university officials to move the program to the Southwest Conference. At the time, the SWC was one of the most prominent football conferences in college football, and besides Arkansas, all of its schools were based in Texas, with fellow metroplex schools TCU and SMU making up two of them. Fry felt distancing the program from a lower-tier conference was a good first step, so the team became a Division I-A Independent before the start of the 1975 season. His plan also included moving some home games into a more prominent venue than tiny Fouts Field could hold, so Fry began scheduling two home games per year at Texas Stadium in nearby Irving, already the home of the NFL's Dallas Cowboys and metroplex rival SMU. Fry also gave the school a complete visual makeover, adding lime green to the color scheme and introducing the infamous "flying worm" logo that became a staple of the university for years to come.

Fry's new-look Mean Green went 7–4–0 in 1974 and 1975, albeit with losses coming against games against Southwest Conference and Southeast Conference opponents. The 1975 season saw a 28–0 drubbing of the SWC's Houston, as well as a close 15–12 road loss to SEC's Mississippi State.

The 1976 season saw marked signs of improvement, with the Mean Green falling in close contests to all their major conference opponents (a 7–0 loss to Mississippi State was later forfeited to North Texas after it was revealed the Bulldogs used ineligible players). The Mean Green lost 17–14 against No. 19 Texas, 38–31 against SMU, 16–10 to the Big Eight Conference's Oklahoma State in Stillwater, and a memorable close 21–20 loss to Florida State in a rare Denton blizzard at Fouts Field.

1977 proved to be a high mark in the history of North Texas football. The Mean Green finished the season 9-2-0 while rolling off a seven-game winning streak, their only loss coming to No. 20 Florida State on the road late in the season (their opening game loss to Mississippi State was retroactively forfeited, giving them an official record of 10-1-0). The program was ranked in the Coaches Poll from week 5 until the end of the season, reaching No. 16 prior to their loss to the Seminoles and reaching No. 13 in week 11. Despite this, North Texas was passed over by every bowl committee. The most notable pass came from the officials of the Independence Bowl, who invited 8–1–2 Louisiana Tech just one week after the Mean Green pummeled them 41–14 at Joe Aillet Stadium in Ruston, Louisiana. The Independence Bowl was contractually obligated to take Louisiana Tech as the Southland Conference champion received an automatic invite to the bowl game.

North Texas would see success again in 1978, finishing 9–2–0 with their only losses coming to Mississippi State and No. 12 Texas, despite hanging with both teams for the better half of three quarters. During the season, reports of sponsors in the state legislature to move the Mean Green to the Southwest Conference never materialized. Though they ended the season on a four-game win streak, Fry's team was once again left without a bowl invitation. With the escalating costs associated with North Texas' SWC bid, along with still-poor attendance and what he felt was a deliberate effort by the NCAA and SMU to keep a lesser-known school like North Texas out of the postseason (the Mustangs were reportedly adamant to the NCAA that North Texas could not play any potential SWC games at Texas Stadium, which Fry had intended to do), Fry began shopping around offers from other programs. The door on the Fry era was essentially slammed shut on December 7, 1978, when the Southwest Conference announced it would not offer North Texas a bid to join the conference. Three days later, Fry accepted the head coaching job at the University of Iowa.

=== Demotion to Division I-AA (FCS), rebound to FBS, and present ===
The mounting debt left over from Fry's tenure reached a point where the NCAA ruled the program could not financially compete at the Division I-A level and the team was subsequently demoted to Division I-AA status. In 1982, the university recognized that the athletics program had a deficit of $1.6 million and voted to join the Southland Conference. The program experienced little success in subsequent years, but in 1995, a coordinated campaign by donors to purchase large blocks of seats at Fouts Field spiked the average attendance enough for the school to enter Division I-A once again in 1995.

After the school joined the Sun Belt Conference in 2001, Darrell Dickey briefly revived fortunes in Denton, winning four straight conference championships. The Mean Green played in the 2001 New Orleans Bowl despite a regular-season finish at 5–6 after winning the Sun Belt title with a 5–1 conference record. After going 2–9 and 3–9 in his eighth and ninth seasons, the athletic department fired Dickey on November 8, 2006.

The school then hired Todd Dodge, who had been offensive coordinator at UNT from 1991 to 1992, on December 12, 2006. Dodge had been one of the nation's most successful high school football coaches, amassing a 98–11 record overall at Carroll High School in Southlake, Texas, including a 79–1 record over his last five years. His teams at UNT struggled to win, however, compiling a 6–37 record overall and a 3–23 record in conference play. After a 1–6 start to the 2010 season, the school fired Dodge. He was replaced by offensive coordinator Mike Canales as interim head coach. In 2011, the university hired Dan McCarney as head coach. McCarney was the head coach at Iowa State from 1995 through 2006; he then served as defensive line coach for both the University of South Florida and the University of Florida just prior to his hiring at North Texas.

On May 4, 2012, the school held a press conference announcing that it had accepted an invitation to join Conference USA beginning with the 2013–2014 season. Florida International University, Louisiana Tech University, the University of North Carolina at Charlotte, and the University of Texas at San Antonio began play in Conference USA in 2013 as well, bringing the conference to 13 members. The Mean Green finished 9–4 in their first season in Conference USA. They competed in the 2014 Heart of Dallas Bowl against the UNLV Rebels in which they won, 36–14. It was their first bowl game since 2004 and first win since 2002.

After the Heart of Dallas Bowl victory, the team saw two declining years; finishing 4–8 in 2014, and a 1–11 record in 2015, which included a 66–7 loss to Portland State, the worst loss by an FBS school to an FCS program in NCAA history. After the loss, Dan McCarney was fired. In December of that year, North Texas hired the previous offensive coordinator at the University of North Carolina, Seth Littrell, to take over.

The Mean Green improved by four wins in Littrell's first year at the helm, and despite having a 5–7 record, Academic Progress Rate scores from the previous year allowed the team to compete in the 2016 Heart of Dallas Bowl after there weren't enough 6-6 programs to fill all of the bowl game slots.

The 2017 and 2018 seasons proved to be two of the best consecutive seasons the program had seen since the Hayden Fry era. In 2017, North Texas finished 9–5, capturing Conference USA's West Division crown. North Texas fell to Florida Atlantic in the 2017 Conference USA Football Championship Game, and went on to lose to Troy in the 2017 New Orleans Bowl. The 2018 team shot off to a 4–0 start before somewhat faltering down the stretch, finishing the season 9–4 after a loss to Utah State in the 2018 New Mexico Bowl.

In 2025, North Texas had a historic season finishing with a record of 12–2. The Mean Green would see their first ranking in the AP poll since 1959, finishing with a rank of #24. The team would also see their first ever College Football Playoff ranking, coming in at #25. Drew Mestemaker was the star of the team in the 2025 season. A true freshman walk-on, Drew would get his first start in the 2025 First Responders Bowl against Texas State University. Despite a close loss of 28–30, Mestemaker proved himself as a strong quarterback, even breaking the UNT passing record with 393 yards in a bowl game. Drew would excel in the 2025 regular season, breaking the UNT and American Conference single game passing record with 608 yards in a blowout win against Charlotte. He would finish with the most passing yards in the nation for an FBS team with 4,379 yards. He would also tie for second in most passing touchdowns nationally with 34. They lost to Tulane in the American Conference Championship 34–21 in New Orleans, Louisiana. The UNT football team put a bow on a historic season with a 49–47 win over San Diego State in the Isleta New Mexico Bowl to cap the program's first-ever 12-win season and snap a seven-game bowl losing skid in the process, winning its first bowl game since the 2013 Heart of Dallas Bowl.

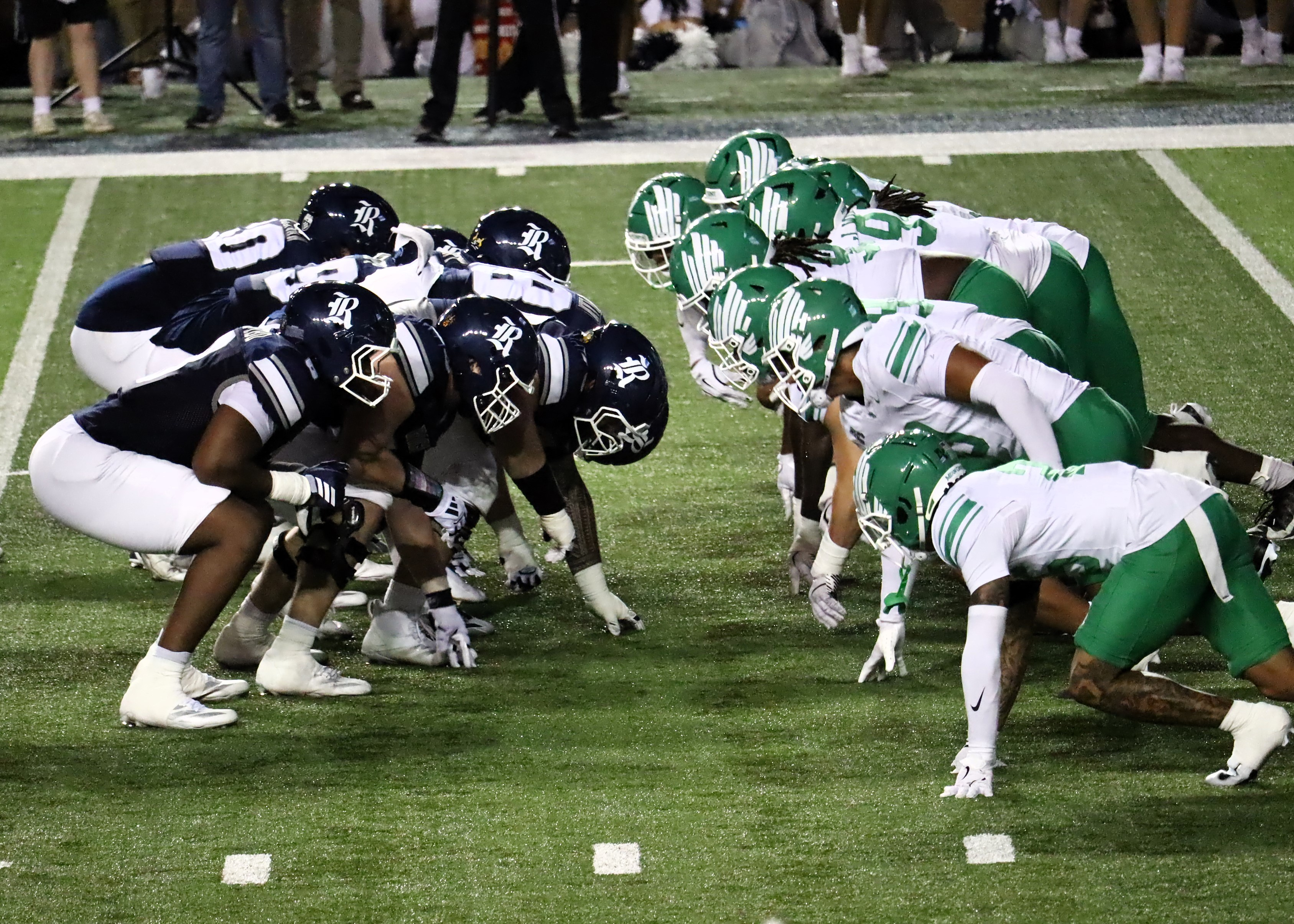
North Texas (right) lines up on defense against Rice during their tenth win of the 2025 season

== Conference affiliations ==
North Texas has been a member of nine different conferences, and has had three stints as an independent team.

- Independent (1913–1921)
- Texas Intercollegiate Athletic Association (1922–1931)
- Lone Star Conference (1932–1948)
- Gulf Coast Conference (1949–1956)
- Missouri Valley Conference (1957–1974)
- NCAA Division I/I-A independent (1975–1981, 1995)
- NCAA Division I-AA independent (1982)
- Southland Conference (1983–1994)
- Big West Conference (1996–2000)
- Sun Belt Conference (2001–2012)
- Conference USA (2013–2022)
- American Conference (2023–present)

== Championships ==
=== Conference championships ===
North Texas has won 25 conference championships (20 outright, five shared).

Season	Conference	Coach	Overall Record
1931	Texas Intercollegiate Athletic Association	Jack Sisco	8–3
1932	Lone Star Conference	Jack Sisco	8–1–1
1935†	Lone Star Conference	Jack Sisco	5–3–1
1936	Lone Star Conference	Jack Sisco	6–2–1
1939	Lone Star Conference	Jack Sisco	6–1
1940	Lone Star Conference	Jack Sisco	6–3
1941	Lone Star Conference	Jack Sisco	7–1
1946	Lone Star Conference	Odus Mitchell	7–3–1
1947	Lone Star Conference	Odus Mitchell	10–2
1950†	Gulf Coast Conference	Odus Mitchell	7–2–1
1951	Gulf Coast Conference	Odus Mitchell	8–4
1952	Gulf Coast Conference	Odus Mitchell	7–3
1955†	Gulf Coast Conference	Odus Mitchell	5–4–1
1956†	Gulf Coast Conference	Odus Mitchell	7–2–1
1958	Missouri Valley Conference	Odus Mitchell	7–2–1
1959	Missouri Valley Conference	Odus Mitchell	9–2
1966	Missouri Valley Conference	Odus Mitchell	8–2
1967	Missouri Valley Conference	Rod Rust	7–1–1
1973	Missouri Valley Conference	Hayden Fry	5–5–1
1983	Southland Conference	Corky Nelson	8–4
1994	Southland Conference	Matt Simon	7–4–1
2001†	Sun Belt Conference	Darrell Dickey	5–7
2002	Sun Belt Conference	Darrell Dickey	8–5
2003	Sun Belt Conference	Darrell Dickey	9–4
2004	Sun Belt Conference	Darrell Dickey	7–5

† Co-champions

=== Division championships ===
Joining Conference USA in 2013 brought North Texas to its first conference with divisions. Split into eastern and western divisions, the Mean Green had to compete against the teams in the western division for a spot in the conference championship game. North Texas won its first title in 2017.

Season	Division	Coach	Opponent	CG result
2017	CUSA West	Seth Littrell	Florida Atlantic	L 17–41

† Co-champions

== NCAA Division I-AA playoff appearances ==
In its time in Division I-AA (now known as the Football Championship Subdivision), the Mean Green qualified for the playoffs four times, garnering a record of 0–4.

Year	Round	Opponent	Result
1983	Quarterfinals	Nevada	L 17–20^{OT}
1987	First Round	Northeast Louisiana	L 9–30
1988	First Round	Marshall	L 0–7
1994	First Round	Boise State	L 20–24

== Bowl games ==
North Texas has played in 16 bowl games with a record of 4–12 through the 2025 season. As Lone Star Conference Champions, North Texas competed in the Optimist Bowl as its first bowl game in 1946 against Pacific. North Texas won the game 14–13.

Season	Coach	Bowl	Stadium	Location	Opponent	Result
1946	Odus Mitchell	Optimist Bowl	Public School Stadium	Houston, TX	Pacific	W 14–13
1947	Odus Mitchell	Salad Bowl	Montgomery Stadium	Phoenix, AZ	Nevada	L 6–13
1959	Odus Mitchell	Sun Bowl	Kidd Field	El Paso, TX	New Mexico State	L 8–28
2001	Darrell Dickey	New Orleans Bowl	Louisiana Superdome	New Orleans, LA	Colorado State	L 20–45
2002	Darrell Dickey	New Orleans Bowl	Louisiana Superdome	New Orleans, LA	Cincinnati	W 24–19
2003	Darrell Dickey	New Orleans Bowl	Louisiana Superdome	New Orleans, LA	Memphis	L 17–27
2004	Darrell Dickey	New Orleans Bowl	Louisiana Superdome	New Orleans, LA	Southern Miss	L 10–31
2013	Dan McCarney	Heart of Dallas Bowl	Cotton Bowl	Dallas, TX	UNLV	W 36–14
2016	Seth Littrell	Heart of Dallas Bowl	Cotton Bowl	Dallas, TX	Army	L 31–38
2017	Seth Littrell	New Orleans Bowl	Mercedes-Benz Superdome	New Orleans, LA	Troy	L 30–50
2018	Seth Littrell	New Mexico Bowl	Dreamstyle Stadium	Albuquerque, NM	Utah State	L 13–52
2020	Seth Littrell	Myrtle Beach Bowl	Brooks Stadium	Conway, SC	Appalachian State	L 28–56
2021	Seth Littrell	Frisco Football Classic	Toyota Stadium	Frisco, TX	Miami (OH)	L 14–27
2022	Phil Bennett	Frisco Bowl	Toyota Stadium	Frisco, TX	Boise State	L 32–35
2024	Eric Morris	First Responder Bowl	Gerald J. Ford Stadium	University Park, TX	Texas State	L 28–30
2025	Eric Morris (season); Drew Svoboda (interim, bowl)	New Mexico Bowl	University Stadium	Albuquerque, NM	San Diego State	W 49–47

== Home field ==
=== DATCU Stadium ===
Since 2011, the Mean Green have played at DATCU Stadium, formerly named Apogee Stadium & Mean Green Stadium. The stadium seats 30,850, but is expandable to 50,000 if ever necessary. The most attended game in DATCU Stadium history was against the South Florida Bulls on October 10, 2025, with a sold-out crowd of 31,386 people in attendance. It was named after ResNet provider Apogee, who paid for the naming rights from 2011 until 2023. However, the Denton Area Teachers Credit Union (DATCU) subsequently purchased naming rights to the facility prior to the 2023 season. The stadium is part of the Mean Green Village, an athletic complex situated at the intersection of Interstate 35 east and west. The stadium is recognizable by its trademark eagle wing in the end zone, facing the freeway. It is the first stadium to be LEED certified, powered by three electric windmills.

=== Fouts Field ===
From 1952 to 2010, the team played its home games at Fouts Field. The first game was a 55–0 win over the North Dakota Fighting Sioux in 1952. The final Mean Green game was a 49–41 loss to the Kansas State Wildcats in 2010. The Mean Green posted a final record at Fouts Field of 155–100–7. From 1971 through 2001, the Mean Green played 21 home games at Texas Stadium in Irving, Texas, 32 miles away from the university's campus in Denton. The team posted a 9–12 record while playing selected home games in Irving. Only one season, 1972, saw the Mean Green play more games at Texas Stadium (4) than on their home field (1) in Denton. Fouts Field was in notoriously poor condition for FBS football in its final years; most notably, one of the power outlets in the press box would cause the entire venue to lose power if used.

=== Eagle Field ===
From the team's inception in 1913 until the opening of Fouts Field in 1952, North Texas played all its home games at Eagle Field. The venue began as just a cleared-out area near the center of campus and didn't have any seats for spectators until steel bleachers were installed in the mid-1920s. The main bleachers sat just off the west sideline of the field, while a smaller set of bleachers were on the east sideline. Both sections of bleachers could seat a combined 2,500 fans. A track also was added around the length of the playing surface. The location as a whole was part of the larger Recreation Park, where athletic programs for students were held. Eagle Field was located on the current site of Willis Library on UNT's campus, situated slightly to the right of the Hurley Administration Building if facing Highland Street, though the field predated the construction of the building and its clock tower by a few decades. The program's first ever game occurred at Eagle Field, a 13–0 loss to TCU in 1913, while the final game was a 20–14 loss to Houston on December 5, 1951. North Texas accumulated a 92–25–5 record in their 36 seasons at Eagle Field for a winning percentage of .754%, which remains their highest at any of their three home stadiums. All that remains of the venue is the supports for the long-gone bleachers; the stretch of large rocks that are still behind Willis Library were the foundation for the installation of the seats.

== Rivalries ==
=== SMU ===
The Safeway Bowl, is the North Texas-SMU rivalry. It was first played in 1922. The Safeway name is derived from a challenge from then North Texas head coach Matt Simon issued in 1994 after a two-year break in the series, stating "I'd like to play because I think we could beat them, and my players feel the same way. If they'd like to play on a Safeway parking lot ... just give us a date and time." The rivalry is either played at SMU in Dallas or at UNT in Denton. In total the two squads have met on the gridiron 43 times with SMU holding a 36–6–1 lead in the series through the 2024 season. This rivalry game was a conference game for one year when UNT joined the American Athletic Conference in 2023, however, since SMU joined the Atlantic Coast Conference in 2024 the game has not been played.

=== UTSA ===
North Texas and UTSA first met in 2013. That year both were first year members of Conference USA (CUSA). The first game was played at then Apogee Stadium in Denton, Texas on November 23, 2013. In 2022, the teams met in the Alamodome for the Conference USA Championship with UTSA winning 48–27. In 2023, the rivalry moved to the American Conference (known before the 2025 season as the American Athletic Conference) following both schools' departure from CUSA. The rivalry as a whole has been played 14 times with UTSA holding an 8–6 lead in the series through the 2025 season.

== Mean Green alumni ==
39 North Texas Mean Green have been drafted into the NFL, most notably NFL Hall of Famer "Mean" Joe Greene who shares his nickname with the school's athletic teams.

=== Current NFL players ===
- Kemon Hall, CB, Tennessee Titans
- Jeff Wilson, RB, Miami Dolphins

=== Retired numbers ===
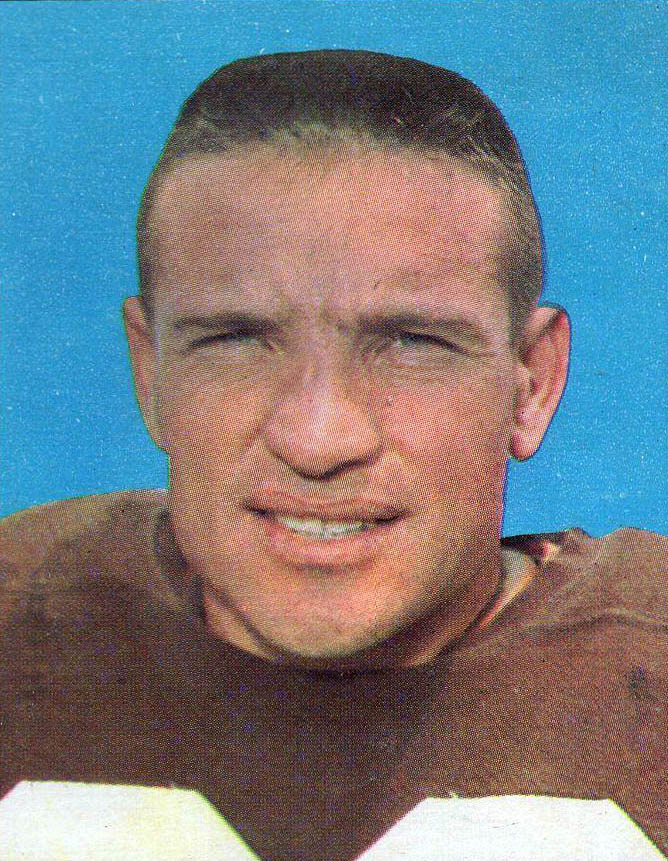
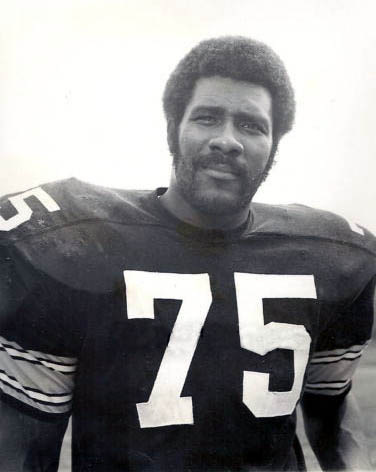
Fltr: Abner Haynes, Ray Renfro, and Joe Greene, who have their numbers retired by North Texas

North Texas Mean Green retired numbers
No.	Player	Pos.	Tenure	No. ret.	Ref.
28	Abner Haynes	HB	1957–1959		
33	Ray Renfro	FL	1949–1951	2000	
55	Richard Gill	LB	1968–1969	1971	
75	Joe Greene	DT	1966–1969	1981	

=== College Football Hall of Famers ===
- Joe Greene

=== Pro Football Hall of Famers ===
- Joe Greene

=== National awards ===
- Burlsworth Trophy (top player who started college career as a walk-on)

Drew Mestemaker – 2025

=== Former players notable in other fields ===
- Kevin Adkisson, professional wrestler better known as Kevin Von Erich
- Johnny Quinn, member of United States bobsled team
- Tobe Nwigwe, rapper and singer
- Steve Williams, professional wrestler and actor now known as "Stone Cold" Steve Austin

== Future non-conference opponents ==
Announced schedules as of August 12, 2026.

2026	2027	2028	2029	2030	2031	2032	2033	2034
at Indiana	Tarleton State	at Baylor	Baylor	Texas State	Central Arkansas	at Colorado	Colorado	at Wyoming
UNLV	at TCU	Louisiana Tech	North Alabama	at Washington State	at UTEP	San Jose State		
at Texas State	Wyoming	East Texas A&M	FIU	Missouri	at Missouri			
Houston Christian	at San Jose State	UTEP		at Wyoming	Western Michigan			

== Broadcasts ==
North Texas games are broadcast on the radio by the Mean Green Sports Network, with 1190 AM KFXR serving as the flagship terrestrial station. Broadcasts are also simulcasted on The Varsity Network from Learfield and are picked up by select SiriusXM stations. Former Texas Rangers, Dallas Mavericks, and San Antonio Spurs announcer Dave Barnett does play-by-play, along with Hank Dickenson on color commentary. Former Mean Green quarterback Nathan Tune is the sideline reporter, while Zac Babb serves as a studio host.

Television broadcasts are carried by the ESPN family of networks.

== See also ==
- American football in the United States
- College football

== Notes ==
- Rogers, James (2002). The story of North Texas. University of North Texas: University of North Texas Press. ISBN 978-1-57441-128-7.
- MacCambridge, Michael (2005). ESPN College Football Encyclopedia. New York, NY: ESPN Books. ISBN 1-4013-3703-1.
