= Odus Mitchell =

American football player and coach (1899–1989)

- Mitchell pictured in The Yucca 1951, North Texas State yearbook

Biographical details
- Born: June 26, 1899; Bell County, Texas, U.S.
- Died: July 5, 1989 (aged 90); Denton, Texas, U.S.

Playing career
- 1921–1924: West Texas State

Coaching career (HC unless noted)
- 1925: Post HS (TX)
- 1926: Childress HS (TX)
- 1927: Slaton HS (TX)
- 1928–1940: Pampa HS (TX)
- 1941–1945: Marshall HS (TX)
- 1946–1966: North Texas State

Head coaching record
- Overall: 122–85–9 (college); 136–70–9 (high school)
- Bowls: 1–2

Accomplishments and honors

Championships
- 2 LSC (1946–1947); 5 GCC (1950–1952, 1955–1956); 3 MVC (1958–1959, 1966)

James Odus Mitchell (June 26, 1899 – July 5, 1989) was an American football player and coach. As a coach, he was successful both at the high school and collegiate levels. In 42 years of coaching, at all levels, he compiled a 258–155–18 record. In his 21 years as a high school coach, he coached at Slaton, Childress, Pampa, and Marshall, compiling a 136–70–9 record. At Marshall he coached Y. A. Tittle. From 1946 to 1966, Mitchell was the head football coach at North Texas State College, now the University of North Texas, compiling a record of 122–85–9. From 1946 to 1952, the Mean Green enjoyed seven consecutive winning seasons, which is a school record. His teams earned 10 conference championships, and played in three bowl games. In his 1966 season, North Texas went 8–2, which helped earn him National Coach of the Year honors. In 1986, he was inducted into the Texas Sports Hall of Fame.

Mitchell was also a catalyst for the integration of college football in the state of Texas, as he instituted a policy allowing "any African American students who showed interest in the football team to be given a fair chance" while he was the head coach at North Texas. He extended a partial scholarship offer to incoming African-American freshmen Abner Haynes and Leon King in 1956, promoting them to the varsity squad in 1957. Haynes and King both made their varsity debuts on the road against UTEP (then known as Texas Western) on September 21, 1957, becoming the first African-Americans to play major college football in Texas.

In the summer of 1965, he also recruited future National Football League Hall of Famer Mean Joe Greene from all-black Dunbar High School in Temple, Texas. The ferocious Greene-led defense allowed an average of less than two yards per carry in 1966, Mitchell's final season at North Texas, earning the team the nickname "Mean Green," which stuck and is now the official mascot of the university to this day.

== Biography ==
Odus Mitchell was born on a farm near Killeen, Texas.

He died in Denton, Texas on July 5, 1989, and was buried at Roselawn Memorial Park.

== Head coaching record ==
=== College ===
Year	Team	Overall	Conference	Standing	Bowl/playoffs
North Texas State Teachers Eagles (Lone Star Conference) (1946–1948)
1946	North Texas State Teachers	7–3–1	4–1	1st	W Optimist
1947	North Texas State Teachers	10–2	6–0	1st	L Salad
1948	North Texas State Teachers	6–4	4–2	2nd	
North Texas State Eagles (Gulf Coast Conference) (1949–1956)
1949	North Texas State	8–4	2–1	2nd	
1950	North Texas State	7–2–1	2–0–1	1st	
1951	North Texas State	8–4	2–0	1st	
1952	North Texas State	7–3	2–0	1st	
1953	North Texas State	3–6–1	1–1	2nd	
1954	North Texas State	4–6	1–1	2nd	
1955	North Texas State	5–4–1	2–1	T–1st	
1956	North Texas State	7–2–1	2–0–1	T–1st	
North Texas State Eagles (Missouri Valley Conference) (1957–1966)
1957	North Texas State	5–5	1–0	2nd	
1958	North Texas State	7–2–1	2–1–1	1st	
1959	North Texas State	9–2	3–1	T–1st	L Sun
1960	North Texas State	2–6–1	0–3	4th	
1961	North Texas State	5–4–1	1–2	T–2nd	
1962	North Texas State	6–4	2–1	1st	
1963	North Texas State	3–6	2–2	T–3rd	
1964	North Texas State	2–7–1	1–3	4th	
1965	North Texas State	3–7	2–2	T–3rd	
1966	North Texas State	8–2	3–1	T–1st	
North Texas State:		122–85–9	45–23–3		
Total:		122–85–9			
National championship Conference title Conference division title or championship game berth
