= Green Brigade Marching Band =

Marching band at the University of North Texas

Green Brigade
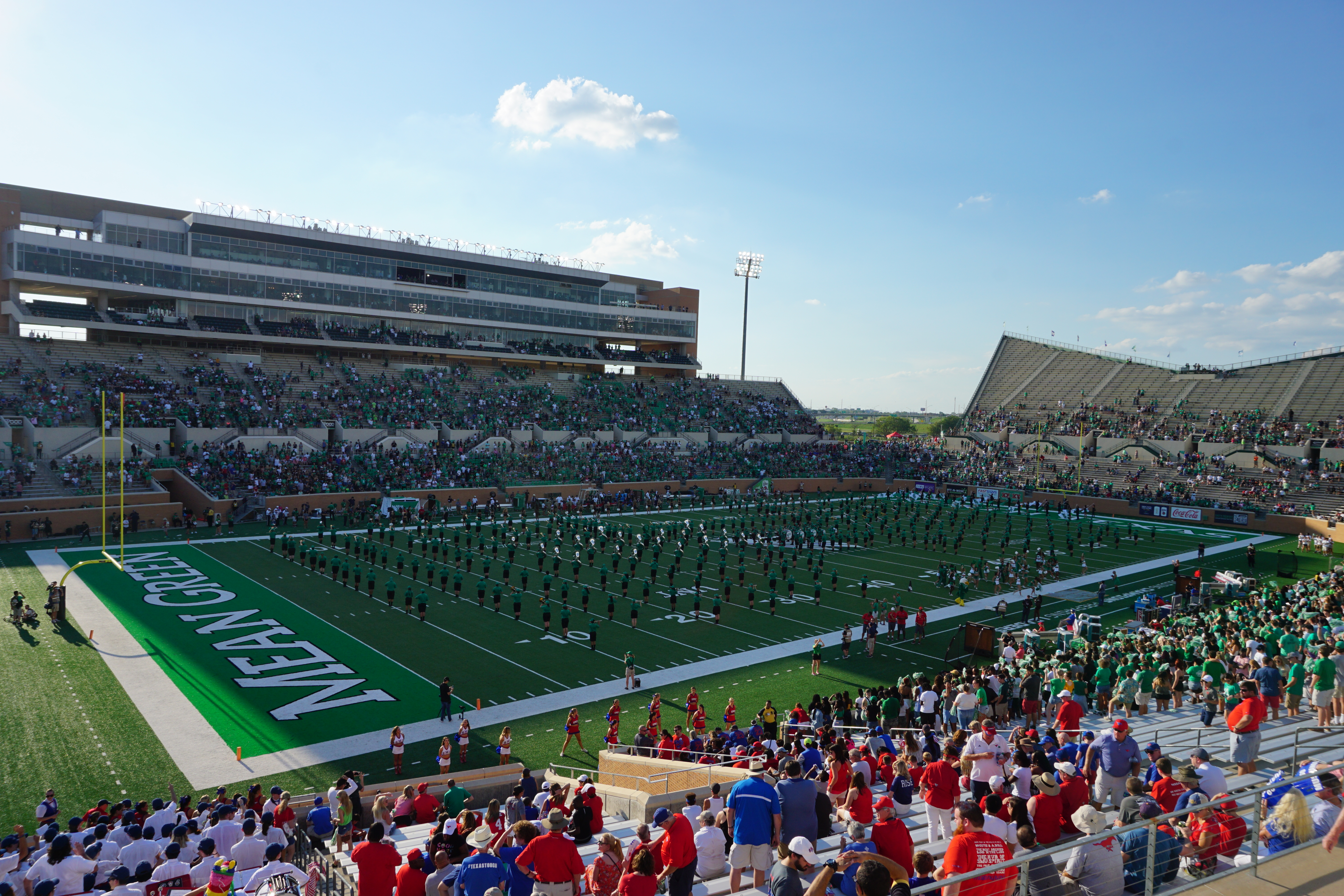
- School: University of North Texas
- Location: Denton, Texas, USA
- Conference: The American
- Founded: 1922
- Director: Professor Amy Woody
- Members: 435
- Fight song: "Fight, North Texas"
- Website: http://music.unt.edu/greenbrigade

The Green Brigade Marching Band is the marching band of the University of North Texas in Denton, home of the North Texas Mean Green. The band is open to all university students, but is curricular and integral for music education majors. The Green Brigade is one of approximately 40 student ensembles in the University of North Texas College of Music, a comprehensive music school with the largest enrollment of any music institution accredited by the National Association of Schools of Music. The band is critically acclaimed and has been featured as an exhibition band for numerous marching festivals — including exhibition performances for the UIL State Marching Contest and various Bands of America competitions throughout the state, and taking part in the 2022 Saint Patrick's Day parade in Dublin.

One of several distinct traditions of the Green Brigade is to perform "You'll Never Walk Alone," from the musical Carousel, at the end of football games.

In 2011, the Bleacher Report dubbed the Green Brigade as "The Best Damn Band in the Land" and the best drumline in college football.

== Filmography ==
- Necessary Roughness (1991)

== Directors of the Green Brigade ==
- 1945–1974: Maurice McAdow (1904–2001)
- 1975–1981: Dr. Robert A. Winslow (1931-2007)
- 1982-1996: Dennis Warren Fisher (b. 1949)
- 1997-2001: Dr. Bradley Genevro (b. 1966)
- 2002: Alfredo Velez (b. 1958)
- 2003–2018: Dr. Nicholas Enrico Williams (b. 1974)
- 2019–2022: Dr. Daniel Cook (b. 1988)
- 2023–2026: Dr. Amy Woody
- 2026-Present: Katharine Reed
