= Fouts Field =

Stadium in Texas, United States

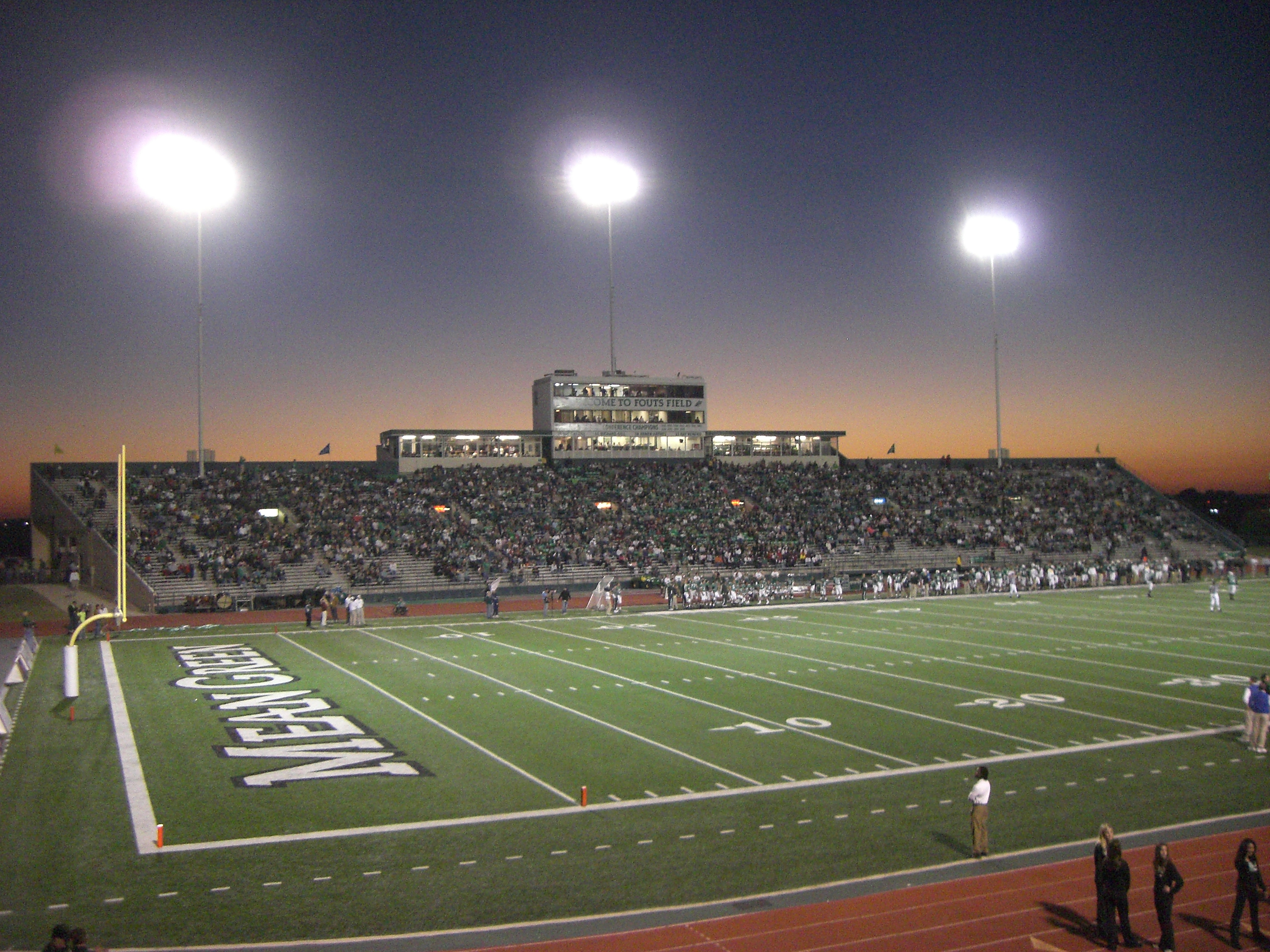
- Interactive map of Fouts Field
- Former names: Eagle Stadium
- Location: 2300 N Interstate 35 E, Denton, TX 76201
- Coordinates: 33°12′30″N 97°9′28″W
- Owner: University of North Texas
- Operator: University of North Texas
- Capacity: 20,000 (1952–1993); 30,500 (1994–2012); 10,000 (2013–2018)
- Surface: Sportex Omnigrass turf

Construction
- Groundbreaking: 1951
- Opened: 1952
- Closed: 2010
- Demolished: 2013 (partial); 2018 (completed)
- Cost: US $850,000 ($8.35 million in 2019)

Tenant
- North Texas Mean Green football (NCAA) (1952–2010)

Fouts Field was a stadium at the University of North Texas, located in Denton, Texas. Its primary use from its opening in 1952 until 2010 was as the home field for North Texas Mean Green football. Over its 59-year history, Fouts Field was the college home of players such as Joe Greene, Abner Haynes, Steve Ramsey, and Steve Anderson, who would later gain worldwide fame as pro wrestler Steve Austin.

== History ==
By the 1940s, college football was beginning to firmly leave its mark as a popular sport in the United States. North Texas had spent its first 40 seasons at Eagle Field, which seated just 2,500 spectators on steel bleachers in an open area near the center of campus called Recreation Park, where the school's athletic events were held. As the popularity of football quickly outgrew the limited number of fans Eagle Field could hold, former football coach and athletic director Theron J. Fouts began pushing for a new master plan for recreational facilities on campus, including a new 20,000-seat football stadium with a track in the southwest corner of the university's property. The plan was approved, and construction on the new facility began in 1951.

Originally christened Eagle Stadium, the new venue opened on September 27, 1952 with a 55–0 win for North Texas State College over the North Dakota Fighting Sioux. The Eagles went 7-3 that season, including a 4–1 mark at the new stadium, winning the Gulf Coast Conference title.

Tragedy struck the North Texas community on April 27, 1954 as Fouts, who was set to retire that June, suffered a heart attack at his home in Denton. The administration of the university almost immediately announced plans to rename the venue Fouts Field in his honor, which was done prior to their 1954 home opener against Southern Miss on October 2.

=== Breaking the color barrier, Mean Joe, and the "Mean Green" ===
Over the next three decades, Fouts Field hosted some of the defining moments in the history of North Texas football. Prior to the 1956 season, Odus Mitchell recruited Abner Haynes and Leon King, both African-Americans, in what was still a largely Jim Crow-era south. After being promoted to the varsity squad in 1957, Haynes and King became the first black players to play major college football in the state of Texas.

In 1967, with the addition of Joe Greene to the defensive line, the Eagles allowed less than two yards per carry on the ground en route to a 7–1–1 record and a Missouri Valley Conference title. The ferocious defense, led by Greene, earned the team the nickname "Mean Green," which soon replaced "Eagles" as the school's official nickname/mascot.

=== Hayden Fry era ===
Fouts Field was nearly put out of use in the mid-1970s after the hiring of future Hall of Fame coach Hayden Fry. Fry began a bold plan to get North Texas admittance into the Southwest Conference; part of that plan included moving potential SWC games to nearby Texas Stadium in Irving, TX. In the meantime, Fouts Field was expanded to including new offices, a state-of-the-art weight room, and new locker rooms in separate buildings just to the right of the north grandstand. While Fry's teams at North Texas in the 1970s proved to be some of the best in school history, the plan to move to the SWC ultimately failed, and the mounting debt left over from the bid forced North Texas to drop down to Division I-AA in 1983.

=== Expansion and final years ===
After a decade in I-AA, a coordinated effort by North Texas donors to purchase large blocks of seats at Fouts Field raised the attendance level enough for the program to be admitted back to Division I-A. The university also expanded the seating capacity, adding two separate sections of 5,250-seat bleachers in each endzone, which raised the total capacity to 30,500. The expanded Fouts saw a mix of good to meager years, culminating with North Texas clinching four straight Sun Belt Conference titles from 2001 to 2004 under Darrell Dickey before bottoming out with a 6–37 record from 2007 to 2010 under Todd Dodge. Throughout the 21st century though, it became more and more clear Fouts Field was no longer up to basic FBS-level standards: Despite the addition of artificial turf in 2005, the electric wiring throughout the venue was often faulty, mold easily grew in the weight room and press boxes, and old plumbing pipes that ran under the playing field often created a horrible stench on the North Texas sideline during hot August and September games.

In 2009, the university began construction of Apogee Stadium across I-35E from Fouts Field, scheduled to open at the start of the 2011 season. The final game at Fouts was played against Kansas State on November 27, 2010, a 49–41 North Texas loss.

The Mean Green finished their 59-year tenure at the stadium with a home record of 155–100–7.

== After football and demolition ==
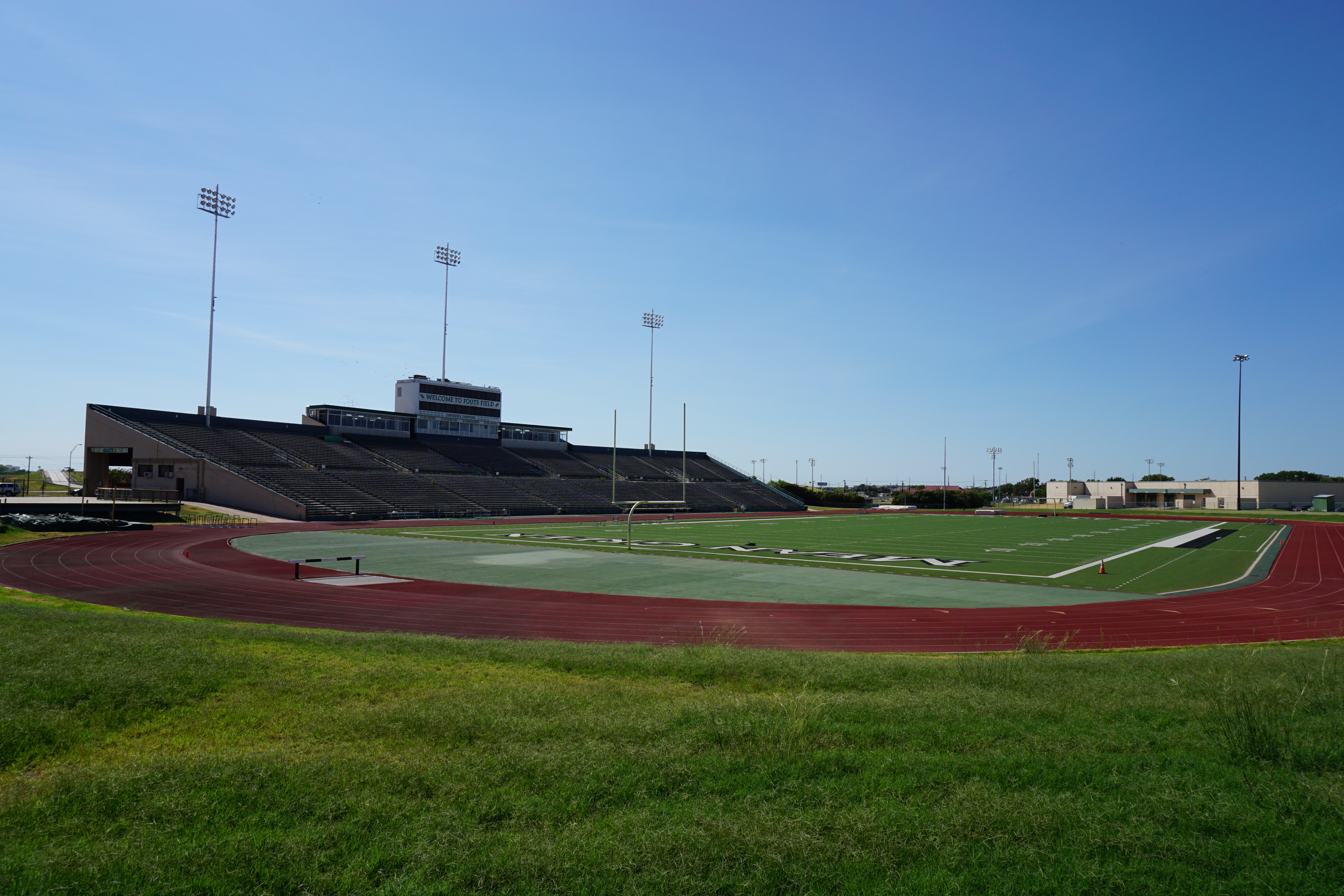
Fouts Field in 2015, after the departure of the football team

Following the departure of the football team, the use of Fouts Field by the university's athletics program was reduced to the school's track and field teams. The stadium was also used as a practice field by the Green Brigade Marching Band, as well as the university's ROTC program.

In 2013, the first phase of demolition began; the north grandstand and bleacher seats in the endzones were removed, leaving just the south grandstand, the playing surface, track, field goal posts, and 1994 scoreboard. The remnants of Fouts Field sat largely empty for the next five years, until demolition began of the remaining components on November 28, 2018, with the last vestiges of the venue cleared out of the lot by December 8. The site was subsequently converted into campus parking spaces and a bus transfer station.

== In popular culture ==
Many of the football scenes in the 1991 film Necessary Roughness were filmed at Fouts Field. The fictional Texas State Armadillos, the team featured in the movie, wore the same colors (green and white) as UNT's football team.

== Attendance history ==
Rank	Attendance	Opponent	Date	Result
1	29,437	Baylor	September 6, 2003	W 52–14
2	28,315	Baylor	August 31, 2000	L 20–7
3	26,012	Navy	November 10, 2007	L 74–62
4	25,231	SMU	September 9, 2006	W 24–6
5	26,119	Rice	September 11, 2010	L 32–31
All-time record in Fouts: 155-100-7 (.605)
