= 1965 Dayton Flyers football team =

American college football season

1965 Dayton Flyers football
- Conference: Independent
- Record: 1–8–1
- Head coach: John McVay (1st season)
- Home stadium: Baujan Field

1965 NCAA University Division independents football records
	Conf.			Overall
Team	W	L	T	W		L		T
New Mexico State		–		8	–	2	–	0
Utah State		–		8	–	2	–	0
Xavier		–		8	–	2	–	0
Texas Western		–		8	–	3	–	0
No. 9 Notre Dame		–		7	–	2	–	1
Southern Miss		–		7	–	2	–	0
Syracuse		–		7	–	3	–	0
Virginia Tech		–		7	–	3	–	0
Georgia Tech		–		7	–	3	–	1
Boston College		–		6	–	4	–	0
West Texas State		–		6	–	4	–	0
Boston University		–		5	–	3	–	1
Buffalo		–		5	–	3	–	2
Miami (FL)		–		5	–	4	–	1
Penn State		–		5	–	5	–	0
Memphis State		–		5	–	5	–	0
San Jose State		–		5	–	5	–	0
Navy		–		4	–	4	–	2
Colgate		–		4	–	5	–	1
Florida State		–		4	–	5	–	1
Army		–		4	–	5	–	1
Houston		–		4	–	5	–	1
Colorado State		–		4	–	6	–	0
Air Force		–		3	–	6	–	1
Pittsburgh		–		3	–	7	–	0
Dayton		–		3	–	7	–	0
Holy Cross		–		2	–	7	–	1
Villanova		–		1	–	8	–	0
Rankings from AP Poll

The 1965 Dayton Flyers football team represented the University of Dayton as an independent during the 1965 NCAA University Division football season. In their first season under head coach John McVay, the Flyers compiled a 1–8–1 record. Dayton played their home games at Baujan Field in Dayton, Ohio.

== Schedule ==
Date	Time	Opponent	Site	Result	Attendance	Source
September 18		at Cincinnati	Nippert Stadium; Cincinnati, OH	L 0–28	18,000	
September 25		at Kent State	Memorial Stadium; Kent, OH	L 6–14	13,500	
October 2		Bowling Green	Baujan Field; Dayton, OH	L 0–9	12,267	
October 9		at Louisville	Fairgrounds Stadium; Louisville, KY	L 0–34	7,800	
October 16	1:30 p.m.	Quantico Marines	Baujan Field; Dayton, OH	L 0–10	12,036	
October 23		at Buffalo	Rotary Field; Buffalo, NY	T 0–0	6,096	
October 30		Ohio	Baujan Field; Dayton, OH	W 13–7	9,429	
November 6		at Xavier	Xavier Stadium; Cincinnati, OH	L 0–10	12,263	
November 13		Miami (OH)	Baujan Field; Dayton, OH	L 0–28	12,123	
November 20		at Toledo	Glass Bowl; Toledo, OH	L 7–21	7,480	
All times are in Eastern time; Source:
