= 1965 Quantico Marines Devil Dogs football team =

College football season

1965 Quantico Marines Devil Dogs football
- Conference: Independent
- Record: 6–4
- Head coach: Joe Caprara (1st season)
- Home stadium: Butler Stadium

The 1965 Quantico Marines Devil Dogs football team represented the Quantico Marine Base in the 1965 college football season. The team was led by first-year head coach Joe Caprara, who had played college football for Notre Dame. The team compiled a 6–4 record, while outscoring their opponents 177–101.

== Schedule ==
Date	Time	Opponent	Site	Result	Attendance	Source
September 25		at Toledo	Glass Bowl; Toledo, OH	L 0–9		
October 2	8:00 p.m.	at Xavier	Xavier Stadium; Cincinnati, OH	L 12–28		
October 9		at Marshall	Fairfield Stadium; Huntington, WV	L 9–10		
October 16	1:30 p.m.	at Dayton	Baujan Field; Dayton, OH	W 10–0	12,036	
October 23	12:30 p.m.	Pensacola NAS	Butler Stadium; Quantico, VA	W 37–0		
October 30		Camp Lejeune	Butler Stadium; Quantico, VA	W 36–12		
November 6	1:30 p.m.	at Villanova	Villanova Stadium; Villanova, PA	W 32–7	7,400	
November 13		at Camp Lejeune	Jacksonville, NC	W 14–7		
November 20		Bradley	Butler Stadium; Quantico, VA	L 7–14		
November 27		Memphis State	Butler Stadium; Quantico, VA	W 20–14	3,000	
All times are in Eastern time; Source:
