= 1965 Arlington State Rebels football team =

American college football season

1965 Arlington State Rebels football
- Conference: Southland Conference
- Record: 6–3 (2–2 Southland)
- Head coach: Chena Gilstrap (13th season)
- Home stadium: Memorial Stadium

1965 Southland Conference football standings
	Conf.					Overall
Team	W		L		T	W		L		T
Lamar Tech $	3	–	1	–	0	6	–	4	–	0
Arlington State	2	–	2	–	0	6	–	3	–	0
Trinity (TX)	2	–	2	–	0	4	–	5	–	1
Abilene Christian	2	–	2	–	0	4	–	5	–	0
Arkansas State	1	–	3	–	0	6	–	3	–	0
$ – Conference champion

The 1965 Arlington State Rebels football team was an American football team that represented Arlington State College (now known as the University of Texas at Arlington) in the Southland Conference during the 1965 NCAA College Division football season. In their thirteenth year under head coach Chena Gilstrap, the team compiled a 6–3 record.

== Schedule ==
Date	Opponent	Site	Result	Attendance	Source
September 18	New Mexico State*	Memorial Stadium; Arlington, TX	L 10–29	9,000	
September 25	Texas A&I*	Memorial Stadium; Arlington, TX	W 25–7	8,700	
October 2	at East Texas State*	Memorial Stadium; Commerce, TX	W 20–6	9,500–10,000	
October 16	at Trinity (TX)	Alamo Stadium; San Antonio, TX	L 0–9	2,605	
October 23	at McMurry*	Shotwell Stadium; Abilene, TX	W 41–16	4,000–5,000	
October 30	Arizona State–Flagstaff*^{†}	Memorial Stadium; Arlington, TX	W 27–6	9,900	
November 6	Abilene Christian	Memorial Stadium; Arlington, TX	L 12–14	7,500	
November 13	at Arkansas State	Kays Stadium; Jonesboro, AR	W 27–12	4,800	
November 20	Lamar Tech	Memorial Stadium; Arlington, TX	W 31–21	7,500	
*Non-conference game; ^{†}Homecoming
