= 1965 Trinity Tigers football team =

American college football season

1965 Trinity Tigers football
- Conference: Southland Conference
- Record: 4–5–1 (2–2 Southland)
- Head coach: W. C. McElhannon (4th season)
- Home stadium: Alamo Stadium

1965 Southland Conference football standings
	Conf.					Overall
Team	W		L		T	W		L		T
Lamar Tech $	3	–	1	–	0	6	–	4	–	0
Arlington State	2	–	2	–	0	6	–	3	–	0
Trinity (TX)	2	–	2	–	0	4	–	5	–	1
Abilene Christian	2	–	2	–	0	4	–	5	–	0
Arkansas State	1	–	3	–	0	6	–	3	–	0
$ – Conference champion

The 1965 Trinity Tigers football team was an American football team that represented Trinity University in the Southland Conference during the 1965 NCAA College Division football season. In their fourth year under head coach W. C. McElhannon, the team compiled a 4–5–1 record.

== Schedule ==
Date	Opponent	Site	Result	Attendance	Source
September 18	McMurry*	Alamo Stadium; San Antonio, TX	T 12–12	4,205	
September 25	at Southwest Texas State*	Evans Field; San Marcos, TX	L 0–27	5,200–5,500	
October 2	at Texas A&I*	Javelina Stadium; Kingsville, TX	L 6–15	4,000–4,500	
October 9	at West Texas State*	Buffalo Bowl; Canyon, TX	L 6–34	11,000	
October 16	Arlington State	Alamo Stadium; San Antonio, TX	W 9–0	2,605	
October 23	at Corpus Christi*	Tarpon Field; Corpus Christi, TX	W 28–14	1,000	
October 30	Texas Lutheran*	Alamo Stadium; San Antonio, TX	W 24–6	2,707	
November 6	at Lamar Tech	Cardinal Stadium; Beaumont, TX	L 3–21	11,062	
November 13	at Abilene Christian	Shotwell Stadium; Abilene, TX	L 27–30	8,000–9,000	
November 20	Arkansas State	Alamo Stadium; San Antonio, TX	W 15–14	1,808–1,850	
*Non-conference game
