= 1965 Furman Paladins football team =

American college football season

1965 Furman Paladins football
- Conference: Southern Conference
- Record: 5–5 (2–3 SoCon)
- Head coach: Bob King (8th season)
- Captains: Grey Geddie; Billy Turner
- Home stadium: Sirrine Stadium

1965 Southern Conference football standings
	Conf.					Overall
Team	W		L		T	W		L		T
West Virginia $	4	–	0	–	0	6	–	4	–	0
William & Mary	5	–	1	–	0	6	–	4	–	0
East Carolina	3	–	1	–	0	9	–	1	–	0
VMI	3	–	2	–	0	3	–	7	–	0
George Washington	4	–	3	–	0	5	–	5	–	0
The Citadel	4	–	4	–	0	4	–	6	–	0
Davidson	2	–	3	–	0	6	–	4	–	0
Furman	2	–	3	–	0	5	–	5	–	0
Richmond	0	–	6	–	0	0	–	10	–	0
$ – Conference champion

The 1965 Furman Paladins football team was an American football team that represented Furman University as a member of the Southern Conference (SoCon) during the 1965 NCAA University Division football season. In their eighth season under head coach Bob King, Furman compiled a 5–5 record, with a mark of 2–3 in conference play, placing eighth in the SoCon.

== Schedule ==
Date	Opponent	Site	Result	Attendance	Source
September 18	Frederick College*	Sirrine Stadium; Greenville, SC	W 51–14	6,000	
September 25	Davidson	Sirrine Stadium; Greenville, SC	L 0–24	7,000	
October 2	No. 8 East Carolina	Sirrine Stadium; Greenville, SC	W 14–7	4,000	
October 9	at Wofford*	Snyder Field; Spartanburg, SC (rivalry)	L 13–35	7,000	
October 16	at Presbyterian*	Bailey Stadium; Clinton, SC	L 7–14	4,000	
October 23	at Newberry*	Setzler Field; Newberry, SC	W 48–12		
October 30	at Lehigh*	Taylor Stadium; Bethlehem, PA	W 27–15	5,500	
November 6	George Washington	Sirrine Stadium; Greenville, SC	L 7–24		
November 13	Richmond	Sirrine Stadium; Greenville, SC	W 14–0	7,000	
November 20	at The Citadel	Johnson Hagood Stadium; Charleston, SC (rivalry)	L 0–28	8,500	
*Non-conference game; Rankings from AP Poll released prior to the game
