= Mel Massucco =

American football player and coach (1925–2002)

Biographical details
- Born: November 22, 1925; Arlington, Massachusetts, U.S.
- Died: March 23, 2002 (aged 76); Worcester, Massachusetts, U.S.

Playing career
- 1948–1951: Holy Cross
- Position: Halfback

Coaching career (HC unless noted)

Football
- 1952–1953: UMass (freshmen)
- 1954–1964: Holy Cross (assistant)
- 1965–1966: Holy Cross
- 1967–1977: WPI

Ice hockey
- 1953–1954: UMass

Head coaching record
- Overall: 33–70–3 (football)

Melvin G. Massucco (November 22, 1925 – March 23, 2002) was an American football player and coach. He served as the head football coach at the College of the Holy Cross in Worcester, Massachusetts from 1965 to 1966 and at Worcester Polytechnic Institute, also in Worcester, from 1967 to 1977, compiling a career college football coaching record of 33–70–3.

Prior to serving at the head coach at Holy Cross, Massucco served as a defensive coach and scout under Hall of Fame coach Eddie Anderson. As an athlete, Massucco was selected by the Chicago Cardinals in the 1952 NFL draft.

== Head coaching record ==
=== Ice hockey ===
Record table
Season	Team	Overall	Conference	Standing	Postseason
Massachusetts Redmen Independent (1953–1954)
1953–54	Massachusetts	0–9–1			
Massachusetts:		0–9–1			
Total:		0–9–1			

=== Football ===
Year	Team	Overall	Conference	Standing	Bowl/playoffs
Holy Cross Crusaders (NCAA University Division independent) (1965–1966)
1965	Holy Cross	2–7–1			
1966	Holy Cross	6–3–1			
Holy Cross:		8–10–2			
WPI Engineers (NCAA College Division / Division III independent) (1967–1976)
1967	WPI	1–6			
1968	WPI	5–2			
1969	WPI	3–5			
1970	WPI	2–6			
1971	WPI	2–6			
1972	WPI	3–5			
1973	WPI	2–6			
1974	WPI	2–6			
1975	WPI	2–5–1			
1976	WPI	2–6			
1977	WPI	1–7			
Holy Cross:		25–60–1			
Total:		33–70–3			
