= 1965 Richmond Spiders football team =

American college football season

1965 Richmond Spiders football
- Conference: Southern Conference
- Record: 0–10 (0–6 SoCon)
- Head coach: Ed Merrick (15th season)
- Home stadium: City Stadium

1965 Southern Conference football standings
	Conf.					Overall
Team	W		L		T	W		L		T
West Virginia $	4	–	0	–	0	6	–	4	–	0
William & Mary	5	–	1	–	0	6	–	4	–	0
East Carolina	3	–	1	–	0	9	–	1	–	0
VMI	3	–	2	–	0	3	–	7	–	0
George Washington	4	–	3	–	0	5	–	5	–	0
The Citadel	4	–	4	–	0	4	–	6	–	0
Davidson	2	–	3	–	0	6	–	4	–	0
Furman	2	–	3	–	0	5	–	5	–	0
Richmond	0	–	6	–	0	0	–	10	–	0
$ – Conference champion

The 1965 Richmond Spiders football team represented the University of Richmond as a member of the Southern Conference (SoCOn) during the 1965 NCAA University Division football season. Led by Ed Merrick in his 15th and final season as head coach, the Spiders compiled an overall record 0–10 with a mark of 0–6 in conference play, placing last out of nine teams in the SoCon. Richmond played home games at City Stadium in Richmond, Virginia.

== Schedule ==
Date	Opponent	Site	Result	Attendance	Source
September 18	at West Virginia	Mountaineer Field; Morgantown, WV	L 0–56		
September 25	Virginia Tech*	City Stadium; Richmond, VA	L 7–25	11,000	
October 2	at Southern Miss*	Faulkner Field; Hattiesburg, MS	L 7–28	10,000	
October 9	East Carolina	City Stadium; Richmond, VA	L 13–34	5,500	
October 16	at Buffalo*	Rotary Field; Buffalo, NY	L 0–24	7,705	
October 23	at Boston College*	Alumni Stadium; Chestnut Hill, MA	L 7–38	24,722	
October 30	The Citadel	City Stadium; Richmond, VA	L 0–24	5,000	
November 6	at VMI	Alumni Memorial Field; Lexington, VA (rivalry)	L 14–21	3,800	
November 13	at Furman	Sirrine Stadium; Greenville, SC	L 0–14	7,000	
November 20	William & Mary	City Stadium; Richmond, VA (rivalry)	L 0–21	11,000	
*Non-conference game
