= 1965 Lamar Tech Cardinals football team =

American college football season

1965 Lamar Tech Cardinals football

Southland champion
- Conference: Southland Conference
- Record: 6–4 (3–1 Southland)
- Head coach: Vernon Glass (3rd season)
- Home stadium: Cardinal Stadium

1965 Southland Conference football standings
	Conf.					Overall
Team	W		L		T	W		L		T
Lamar Tech $	3	–	1	–	0	6	–	4	–	0
Arlington State	2	–	2	–	0	6	–	3	–	0
Trinity (TX)	2	–	2	–	0	4	–	5	–	1
Abilene Christian	2	–	2	–	0	4	–	5	–	0
Arkansas State	1	–	3	–	0	6	–	3	–	0
$ – Conference champion

The 1965 Lamar Tech Cardinals football team represented Lamar State College of Technology—now known as Lamar University—as a member of the Southland Conference during the 1965 NCAA College Division football season. Led by third-year head coach Vernon Glass, the Cardinals compiled an overall record of 6–4 with a mark of 3–1 in conference play, winning the Southland title. Lamar Tech played home games at Cardinal Stadium in Beaumont, Texas.

== Schedule ==
Date	Opponent	Rank	Site	Result	Attendance	Source
September 18	at East Central*		Norris Field; Ada, OK	W 15–14	4,000	
September 25	at New Mexico State*		Memorial Stadium; Las Cruces, NM	L 20–21	11,200	
October 2	Pensacola Navy*		Cardinal Stadium; Beaumont, TX	W 37–0	15,208	
October 9	No. 10 Arkansas State		Cardinal Stadium; Beaumont, TX	W 20–7	16,000	
October 16	at Abilene Christian	No. 10	Shotwell Stadium; Abilene, TX	W 28–18	5,000–7,200	
October 23	at Texas A&I*	No. 7	Javelina Stadium; Kingsville, TX	L 6–14	8,500	
October 30	Southwestern Louisiana*	No. 10	Cardinal Stadium; Beaumont, TX (rivalry)	L 6–20	10,102	
November 6	Trinity (TX)		Cardinal Stadium; Beaumont, TX	W 21–3	11,062	
November 13	West Texas State*		Cardinal Stadium; Beaumont, TX	W 21–14	10,427	
November 20	at Arlington State		Memorial Stadium; Arlington, TX	L 21–31	7,500	
*Non-conference game; Rankings from AP Poll released prior to the game
