= 1965 Arkansas State Indians football team =

American college football season

1965 Arkansas State Indians football
- Conference: Southland Conference
- Record: 6–3 (1–3 Southland)
- Head coach: Bennie Ellender (3rd season)
- Home stadium: Kays Stadium

1965 Southland Conference football standings
	Conf.					Overall
Team	W		L		T	W		L		T
Lamar Tech $	3	–	1	–	0	6	–	4	–	0
Arlington State	2	–	2	–	0	6	–	3	–	0
Trinity (TX)	2	–	2	–	0	4	–	5	–	1
Abilene Christian	2	–	2	–	0	4	–	5	–	0
Arkansas State	1	–	3	–	0	6	–	3	–	0
$ – Conference champion

The 1965 Arkansas State Indians football team represented Arkansas State College—now known as Arkansas State University—as a member of the Southland Conference during the 1965 NCAA College Division football season. Led by third-year head coach Bennie Ellender, the Indians compiled an overall record of 6–3 with a mark of 1–3 in conference play, finishing last out of five teams in the Southland.

== Schedule ==
Date	Opponent	Rank	Site	Result	Attendance	Source
September 18	at Tennessee Tech*		Tucker Stadium; Cookeville, TN	W 12–7	3,500	
September 25	Florence State*		Kays Stadium; Jonesboro, AR	W 33–12	7,600	
October 2	Stephen F. Austin*		Kays Stadium; Jonesboro, AR	W 3–0	7,149	
October 9	at Lamar Tech	No. 10	Cardinal Stadium; Beaumont, TX	L 7–20	16,000	
October 16	at The Citadel*		Johnson Hagood Stadium; Charleston, SC	W 14–0	7,580	
October 23	Abilene Christian		Kays Stadium; Jonesboro, AR	W 35–13	6,200	
October 30	Murray State*^{†}		Kays Stadium; Jonesboro, AR	W 27–13	8,765	
November 13	Arlington State		Kays Stadium; Jonesboro, AR	L 12–27	4,800	
November 20	at Trinity (TX)		Alamo Stadium; San Antonio, TX	L 14–15	1,808–1,850	
*Non-conference game; ^{†}Homecoming; Rankings from AP Poll released prior to the game
