= 1965 VMI Keydets football team =

American college football season

1965 VMI Keydets football
- Conference: Southern Conference
- Record: 3–7 (3–2 SoCon)
- Head coach: John McKenna (13th season)
- Home stadium: Alumni Memorial Field

1965 Southern Conference football standings
	Conf.					Overall
Team	W		L		T	W		L		T
West Virginia $	4	–	0	–	0	6	–	4	–	0
William & Mary	5	–	1	–	0	6	–	4	–	0
East Carolina	3	–	1	–	0	9	–	1	–	0
VMI	3	–	2	–	0	3	–	7	–	0
George Washington	4	–	3	–	0	5	–	5	–	0
The Citadel	4	–	4	–	0	4	–	6	–	0
Davidson	2	–	3	–	0	6	–	4	–	0
Furman	2	–	3	–	0	5	–	5	–	0
Richmond	0	–	6	–	0	0	–	10	–	0
$ – Conference champion

The 1965 VMI Keydets football team was an American football team that represented the Virginia Military Institute (VMI) as a member of the Southern Conference (SoCon) during the 1965 NCAA University Division football season. In their 13th year under head coach John McKenna, the team compiled an overall record of 3–7 with a mark of 3–2 in conference play, placing fourth in the SoCon.

== Schedule ==
Date	Opponent	Site	Result	Attendance	Source
September 18	at William & Mary	Cary Field; Williamsburg, VA (rivalry)	L 21–32	10,000	
September 25	at Army*	Michie Stadium; West Point, NY	L 7–21	21,000	
October 2	at George Washington	District of Columbia Stadium; Washington, DC	L 0–14	10,500	
October 9	at Virginia*	Scott Stadium; Charlottesville, VA	L 10–14	21,000	
October 16	at Southern Miss*	Faulkner Field; Hattiesburg, MS	L 0–3	13,000	
October 23	at Davidson	Richardson Field; Davidson, NC	W 16–10	9,000	
October 30	at Boston College*	Alumni Stadium; Chestnut Hill, MA	L 12–41	20,127	
November 6	Richmond	Alumni Memorial Field; Lexington, VA (rivalry)	W 21–14	3,800	
November 13	The Citadel	Alumni Memorial Field; Lexington, VA (rivalry)	W 21–7	4,127	
November 25	vs. Virginia Tech*	Victory Stadium; Roanoke, VA (rivalry)	L 13–44	23,000	
*Non-conference game
