= 1965 George Washington Colonials football team =

American college football season

1965 George Washington Colonials football
- Conference: Southern Conference
- Record: 5–5 (4–3 SoCon)
- Head coach: Jim Camp (5th season)
- Home stadium: District of Columbia Stadium

1965 Southern Conference football standings
	Conf.					Overall
Team	W		L		T	W		L		T
West Virginia $	4	–	0	–	0	6	–	4	–	0
William & Mary	5	–	1	–	0	6	–	4	–	0
East Carolina	3	–	1	–	0	9	–	1	–	0
VMI	3	–	2	–	0	3	–	7	–	0
George Washington	4	–	3	–	0	5	–	5	–	0
The Citadel	4	–	4	–	0	4	–	6	–	0
Davidson	2	–	3	–	0	6	–	4	–	0
Furman	2	–	3	–	0	5	–	5	–	0
Richmond	0	–	6	–	0	0	–	10	–	0
$ – Conference champion

The 1965 George Washington Colonials football team was an American football team that represented George Washington University as part of the Southern Conference during the 1965 NCAA University Division football season. In its fifth season under head coach Jim Camp, the team compiled a 5–5 record (4–3 in the SoCon).

== Schedule ==
Date	Opponent	Site	Result	Attendance	Source
September 18	at Temple*	Temple Stadium; Philadelphia, PA	W 21–13	10,200	
September 25	The Citadel	District of Columbia Stadium; Washington, DC	W 30–7	7,500	
October 2	VMI	District of Columbia Stadium; Washington, DC	W 14–0	10,500	
October 9	Virginia Tech*	District of Columbia Stadium; Washington, DC	L 12–17	12,500	
October 15	Cincinnati*	District of Columbia Stadium; Washington, DC	L 3–13	10,000	
October 23	at William & Mary	Cary Field; Williamsburg, VA	L 14–28	11,000	
October 30	Davidson	District of Columbia Stadium; Washington, DC	W 23–7	7,500	
November 6	at Furman	Sirrine Stadium; Greenville, SC	W 24–7		
November 13	at No. 6 East Carolina	Ficklen Stadium; Greenville, NC	L 20–21	13,202	
November 20	at West Virginia	Mountaineer Field; Morgantown, WV	L 24–37	16,000	
*Non-conference game; Rankings from AP Poll released prior to the game
