= 1965 William & Mary Indians football team =

American college football season

1965 William & Mary Indians football
- Conference: Southern Conference
- Record: 6–4 (5–1 SoCon)
- Head coach: Marv Levy (2nd season)
- Captains: Tom Feola; Jim Dick
- Home stadium: Cary Field

1965 Southern Conference football standings
	Conf.					Overall
Team	W		L		T	W		L		T
West Virginia $	4	–	0	–	0	6	–	4	–	0
William & Mary	5	–	1	–	0	6	–	4	–	0
East Carolina	3	–	1	–	0	9	–	1	–	0
VMI	3	–	2	–	0	3	–	7	–	0
George Washington	4	–	3	–	0	5	–	5	–	0
The Citadel	4	–	4	–	0	4	–	6	–	0
Davidson	2	–	3	–	0	6	–	4	–	0
Furman	2	–	3	–	0	5	–	5	–	0
Richmond	0	–	6	–	0	0	–	10	–	0
$ – Conference champion

The 1965 William & Mary Indians football team was an American football team that represented the College of William & Mary as a member of the Southern Conference (SoCon) during the 1965 NCAA University Division football season. In their second season under head coach Marv Levy, the Indians compiled a 6–4 record with a mark of 5–1 in conference play, finishing second in the SoCon. The game versus VPI was the first-ever varsity football game played at Lane Stadium, but the Indians lost 9–7.

== Schedule ==
Date	Opponent	Site	Result	Attendance	Source
September 18	VMI	Cary Field; Williamsburg, VA (rivalry)	W 32–21	10,000	
September 25	West Virginia	Cary Field; Williamsburg, VA	L 14–34	9,500	
October 2	at Virginia Tech*	Lane Stadium; Blacksburg, VA	L 7–9	15,000	
October 9	at Navy*	Navy–Marine Corps Memorial Stadium; Annapolis, MD	L 14–42	21,375	
October 16	at Davidson	Richardson Stadium; Davidson, NC	W 41–7	8,700	
October 23	George Washington	Cary Field; Williamsburg, VA	W 28–14	11,000	
October 30	vs. Southern Miss*	Foreman Field; Norfolk, VA (Oyster Bowl)	W 3–0	24,000	
November 6	at The Citadel	Johnson Hagood Stadium; Charleston, SC	W 20–6	9,500	
November 13	at Boston College*	Alumni Stadium; Chestnut Hill, MA	L 17–30	17,527	
November 20	at Richmond	City Stadium; Richmond, VA (rivalry)	W 21–0	11,000	
*Non-conference game
