= 1965 East Carolina Pirates football team =

American college football season

1965 East Carolina Pirates football

Tangerine Bowl champion

Tangerine Bowl, W 31–0 vs. Maine
- Conference: Southern Conference
- Record: 9–1 (3–1 SoCon)
- Head coach: Clarence Stasavich (4th season)
- Home stadium: Ficklen Memorial Stadium

1965 Southern Conference football standings
	Conf.					Overall
Team	W		L		T	W		L		T
West Virginia $	4	–	0	–	0	6	–	4	–	0
William & Mary	5	–	1	–	0	6	–	4	–	0
East Carolina	3	–	1	–	0	9	–	1	–	0
VMI	3	–	2	–	0	3	–	7	–	0
George Washington	4	–	3	–	0	5	–	5	–	0
The Citadel	4	–	4	–	0	4	–	6	–	0
Davidson	2	–	3	–	0	6	–	4	–	0
Furman	2	–	3	–	0	5	–	5	–	0
Richmond	0	–	6	–	0	0	–	10	–	0
$ – Conference champion

The 1965 East Carolina Pirates football team was an American football team that represented East Carolina College (now known as East Carolina University) as a member of the Southern Conference, although they were classified in the College Division during the 1965 NCAA College Division football season. In their fourth season under head coach Clarence Stasavich, the team compiled a 9–1 record.

== Schedule ==
Date	Opponent	Rank	Site	Result	Attendance	Source
September 25	West Chester*		Ficklen Memorial Stadium; Greenville, NC	W 27–6	13,500	
October 2	at Furman	No. 8	Sirrine Stadium; Greenville, SC	L 7–14	4,000	
October 9	at Richmond		City Stadium; Richmond, VA	W 34–13	5,500	
October 16	at Louisville*		Fairgrounds Stadium; Louisville, KY	W 34–20	8,800	
October 23	The Citadel		Ficklen Memorial Stadium; Greenville, NC	W 21–0	13,800	
October 30	at Northeast Louisiana State*		Brown Stadium; Monroe, LA	W 45–0	2,000	
November 6	Lenoir Rhyne*	No. 10	Ficklen Memorial Stadium; Greenville, NC	W 44–0	16,332	
November 13	George Washington	No. 6	Ficklen Memorial Stadium; Greenville, NC	W 21–20	13,202	
November 20	at Howard (AL)*	No. 5	Seibert Stadium; Homewood, AL	W 35–10	3,000	
December 11	vs. No. 7 Maine*	No. 8	Tangerine Bowl; Orlando, FL (Tangerine Bowl)	W 31–0	8,350	
*Non-conference game; Rankings from AP Poll released prior to the game
