= 1965 Abilene Christian Wildcats football team =

American college football season

1965 Abilene Christian Wildcats football
- Conference: Southland Conference
- Record: 4–5 (2–2 Southland)
- Head coach: Les Wheeler (4th season)
- Home stadium: Shotwell Stadium

1965 Southland Conference football standings
	Conf.					Overall
Team	W		L		T	W		L		T
Lamar Tech $	3	–	1	–	0	6	–	4	–	0
Arlington State	2	–	2	–	0	6	–	3	–	0
Trinity (TX)	2	–	2	–	0	4	–	5	–	1
Abilene Christian	2	–	2	–	0	4	–	5	–	0
Arkansas State	1	–	3	–	0	6	–	3	–	0
$ – Conference champion

The 1965 Abilene Christian Wildcats football team was an American football team that represented Abilene Christian College (now known as Abilene Christian University) in the Southland Conference during the 1965 NCAA College Division football season. In their fourth year under head coach Les Wheeler, the team compiled a 4–5 record.

== Schedule ==
Date	Opponent	Site	Result	Attendance	Source
September 18	at East Texas State*	Memorial Stadium; Commerce, TX	L 20–21	6,000	
September 25	at Howard Payne*	Lion Stadium; Brownwood, TX	W 45–0	4,000–4,023	
October 2	vs. McMurry*	Shotwell Stadium; Abilene, TX	L 8–9	8,000–8,500	
October 16	No. 10 Lamar Tech	Shotwell Stadium; Abilene, TX	L 18–28	5,000–7,200	
October 23	at Arkansas State	Kays Stadium; Jonesboro, AR	L 13–35	6,200	
October 30	Drake*	Shotwell Stadium; Abilene, TX	L 7–24	3,500	
November 6	at Arlington State	Memorial Stadium; Arlington, TX	W 14–12	7,500	
November 13	Trinity (TX)	Shotwell Stadium; Abilene, TX	W 30–27	8,000–9,000	
November 20	at Angelo State*	San Angelo Stadium; San Angelo, TX	W 41–12	3,500	
*Non-conference game; Rankings from AP Poll released prior to the game
