= 1965 West Virginia Mountaineers football team =

American college football season

1965 West Virginia Mountaineers football

SoCon champion
- Conference: Southern Conference
- Record: 6–4 (4–0 SoCon)
- Head coach: Gene Corum (6th season)
- Home stadium: Mountaineer Field

1965 Southern Conference football standings
	Conf.					Overall
Team	W		L		T	W		L		T
West Virginia $	4	–	0	–	0	6	–	4	–	0
William & Mary	5	–	1	–	0	6	–	4	–	0
East Carolina	3	–	1	–	0	9	–	1	–	0
VMI	3	–	2	–	0	3	–	7	–	0
George Washington	4	–	3	–	0	5	–	5	–	0
The Citadel	4	–	4	–	0	4	–	6	–	0
Davidson	2	–	3	–	0	6	–	4	–	0
Furman	2	–	3	–	0	5	–	5	–	0
Richmond	0	–	6	–	0	0	–	10	–	0
$ – Conference champion

The 1965 West Virginia Mountaineers football team represented West Virginia University as a member of the Southern Conference (SoCon) during the 1965 NCAA University Division football season. Led by Gene Corum in his sixth and final season as head coach, the Mountaineers compiled an overall record of 6–4 with a mark of 4–0 in conference play, winning the SoCon title for the second consecutive season.

== Schedule ==
Date	Opponent	Site	Result	Attendance	Source
September 19	Richmond	Mountaineer Field; Morgantown, WV	W 56–0		
September 25	at William & Mary	Cary Field; Williamsburg, VA	W 34–14	9,500	
October 2	Pittsburgh*	Mountaineer Field; Morgantown, WV (rivalry)	W 63–48	35,000	
October 9	at The Citadel	Johnson Hagood Stadium; Charleston, SC	W 25–2		
October 16	vs. Virginia*	City Stadium; Richmond, VA (Tobacco Bowl)	L 0–41	24,000	
October 23	at Penn State*	Beaver Stadium; University Park, PA (rivalry)	L 6–44	44,230	
October 30	at Kentucky*	McLean Stadium; Lexington, KY	L 8–28	37,500	
November 6	Virginia Tech*	Mountaineer Field; Morgantown, WV (rivalry)	W 31–22	23,000	
November 13	Syracuse*	Mountaineer Field; Morgantown, WV (rivalry)	L 19–41	33,500	
November 20	George Washington	Mountaineer Field; Morgantown, WV	W 37–24	16,000	
*Non-conference game
