= 1965 West Texas State Buffaloes football team =

American college football season

1965 West Texas State Buffaloes football
- Conference: Independent
- Record: 6–4
- Head coach: Joe Kerbel (6th season)
- Home stadium: Buffalo Bowl

1965 NCAA University Division independents football records
	Conf.			Overall
Team	W	L	T	W		L		T
New Mexico State		–		8	–	2	–	0
Utah State		–		8	–	2	–	0
Xavier		–		8	–	2	–	0
Texas Western		–		8	–	3	–	0
No. 9 Notre Dame		–		7	–	2	–	1
Southern Miss		–		7	–	2	–	0
Syracuse		–		7	–	3	–	0
Virginia Tech		–		7	–	3	–	0
Georgia Tech		–		7	–	3	–	1
Boston College		–		6	–	4	–	0
West Texas State		–		6	–	4	–	0
Boston University		–		5	–	3	–	1
Buffalo		–		5	–	3	–	2
Miami (FL)		–		5	–	4	–	1
Penn State		–		5	–	5	–	0
Memphis State		–		5	–	5	–	0
San Jose State		–		5	–	5	–	0
Navy		–		4	–	4	–	2
Colgate		–		4	–	5	–	1
Florida State		–		4	–	5	–	1
Army		–		4	–	5	–	1
Houston		–		4	–	5	–	1
Colorado State		–		4	–	6	–	0
Air Force		–		3	–	6	–	1
Pittsburgh		–		3	–	7	–	0
Dayton		–		3	–	7	–	0
Holy Cross		–		2	–	7	–	1
Villanova		–		1	–	8	–	0
Rankings from AP Poll

The 1965 West Texas State Buffaloes football team represented West Texas State University (now known as West Texas A&M University) as an independent during the 1965 NCAA University Division football season. In their sixth season under head coach Joe Kerbel, the Buffaloes compiled an 6–4 record. West Texas State played home games at the Buffalo Bowl in Canyon, Texas.

== Schedule ==
Date	Opponent	Site	Result	Attendance	Source
September 18	at Ohio	Peden Stadium; Athens, OH	W 7–0	14,200	
September 25	Bowling Green	Buffalo Bowl; Canyon, TX	W 34–0	15,500	
October 2	Arizona State	Buffalo Bowl; Canyon, TX	W 22–14	17,000	
October 9	Trinity (TX)	Buffalo Bowl; Canyon, TX	W 34–6	11,000	
October 16	Colorado State	Buffalo Bowl; Canyon, TX	W 15–12		
October 23	New Mexico State	Buffalo Bowl; Canyon, TX	L 2–10	17,700	
October 30	at Memphis State	Memphis Memorial Stadium; Memphis, TN	L 12–27	19,182	
November 6	Drake	Buffalo Bowl; Canyon, TX	W 20–14	11,000	
November 13	at Lamar Tech	Cardinal Stadium; Beaumont, TX	L 14–21	10,427	
November 27	at Texas Western	Sun Bowl; El Paso, TX	L 21–38	14,767	
