= 1965 Davidson Wildcats football team =

American college football season

1965 Davidson Wildcats football
- Conference: Southern Conference
- Record: 6–4 (2–3 SoCon)
- Head coach: Homer Smith (1st season)
- Home stadium: Richardson Stadium

1965 Southern Conference football standings
	Conf.					Overall
Team	W		L		T	W		L		T
West Virginia $	4	–	0	–	0	6	–	4	–	0
William & Mary	5	–	1	–	0	6	–	4	–	0
East Carolina	3	–	1	–	0	9	–	1	–	0
VMI	3	–	2	–	0	3	–	7	–	0
George Washington	4	–	3	–	0	5	–	5	–	0
The Citadel	4	–	4	–	0	4	–	6	–	0
Davidson	2	–	3	–	0	6	–	4	–	0
Furman	2	–	3	–	0	5	–	5	–	0
Richmond	0	–	6	–	0	0	–	10	–	0
$ – Conference champion

The 1965 Davidson Wildcats football team represented Davidson College as a member of the Southern Conference (SoCon) during the 1965 NCAA University Division football season. Led by first-year head coach Homer Smith, the Wildcats compiled an overall record of 6–4 with a mark of 2–3 in conference play, tying for seventh place in the SoCon.

== Schedule ==
Date	Opponent	Site	Result	Attendance	Source
September 18	Presbyterian*	Richardson Stadium; Davidson, NC	W 35–0	8,000	
September 25	at Furman	Sirrine Stadium; Greenville, SC	W 24–0	7,000	
October 2	at The Citadel	Johnson Hagood Stadium; Charleston, SC	W 14–0	8,500	
October 16	William & Mary	Richardson Stadium; Davidson, NC	L 7–41	8,700	
October 23	VMI	Richardson Stadium; Davidson, NC	L 10–16	9,000	
October 30	at George Washington	District of Columbia Stadium; Washington, DC	L 7–23	7,500	
November 6	Lehigh*	Richardson Stadium; Davidson, NC	W 37–23	7,200	
November 13	at Lafayette*	Fisher Field; Easton, PA	W 14–10	3,500–4,000	
November 20	Wofford*	Richardson Stadium; Davidson, NC	W 13–6	7,300	
November 27	vs. Bucknell*	American Legion Memorial Stadium; Charlotte, NC	L 14–22	5,000–7,200	
*Non-conference game
