= 1965 The Citadel Bulldogs football team =

American college football season

1965 The Citadel Bulldogs football
- Conference: Southern Conference
- Record: 4–6 (4–4 SoCon)
- Head coach: Eddie Teague (9th season)
- Home stadium: Johnson Hagood Stadium

1965 Southern Conference football standings
| | Conf. | | | | | Overall |
| Team | W | | L | | T | W | | L | | T |
|---|---|---|---|---|---|---|---|---|---|---|
| West Virginia $ | 4 | – | 0 | – | 0 | 6 | – | 4 | – | 0 |
| William & Mary | 5 | – | 1 | – | 0 | 6 | – | 4 | – | 0 |
| East Carolina | 3 | – | 1 | – | 0 | 9 | – | 1 | – | 0 |
| VMI | 3 | – | 2 | – | 0 | 3 | – | 7 | – | 0 |
| George Washington | 4 | – | 3 | – | 0 | 5 | – | 5 | – | 0 |
| The Citadel | 4 | – | 4 | – | 0 | 4 | – | 6 | – | 0 |
| Davidson | 2 | – | 3 | – | 0 | 6 | – | 4 | – | 0 |
| Furman | 2 | – | 3 | – | 0 | 5 | – | 5 | – | 0 |
| Richmond | 0 | – | 6 | – | 0 | 0 | – | 10 | – | 0 |
$ – Conference champion

The 1965 The Citadel Bulldogs football team represented The Citadel, The Military College of South Carolina in the 1965 NCAA University Division football season. Eddie Teague served as head coach for the ninth season. The Bulldogs played as members of the Southern Conference and played home games at Johnson Hagood Stadium.

== Schedule ==
| Date | Opponent | Site | Result | Attendance | Source |
|---|---|---|---|---|---|
| September 18 | South Carolina* | Johnson Hagood Stadium; Charleston, SC | L 3–13 | 20,111 (Note: The attendance for this game set a record for Johnson Hagood Stadium which stood until 1992.) | |
| September 25 | at George Washington | District of Columbia Stadium; Washington, DC | L 7–30 | 7,500 | |
| October 2 | Davidson | Johnson Hagood Stadium; Charleston, SC | L 0–14 | 8,500 | |
| October 9 | West Virginia | Johnson Hagood Stadium; Charleston, SC | L 2–25 | | |
| October 16 | Arkansas State* | Johnson Hagood Stadium; Charleston, SC | L 0–14 | 7,580 | |
| October 23 | at East Carolina | Dowdy–Ficklen Stadium; Greenville, NC | W 24–0 | 13,800 | |
| October 30 | at Richmond | City Stadium (Richmond); Richmond, VA | W 24–0 | 5,000 | |
| November 6 | William & Mary | Johnson Hagood Stadium; Charleston, SC | L 6–21 | 9,500 | |
| November 13 | at VMI | Alumni Memorial Field; Lexington, VA (rivalry) | L 7–21 | 4,127 | |
| November 20 | Furman^{†} | Johnson Hagood Stadium; Charleston, SC (rivalry) | W 28–0 | 8,500 | |
*Non-conference game; ^{†}Homecoming
