= 1965 Boston College Eagles football team =

American college football season

1965 Boston College Eagles football
- Conference: Independent
- Record: 6–4
- Head coach: Jim Miller (4th season)
- Captain: Charlie Smith
- Home stadium: Alumni Stadium

1965 NCAA University Division independents football records
| | Conf. | | | Overall |
| Team | W | L | T | W | | L | | T |
|---|---|---|---|---|---|---|---|---|
| New Mexico State | | – | | 8 | – | 2 | – | 0 |
| Utah State | | – | | 8 | – | 2 | – | 0 |
| Xavier | | – | | 8 | – | 2 | – | 0 |
| Texas Western | | – | | 8 | – | 3 | – | 0 |
| No. 9 Notre Dame | | – | | 7 | – | 2 | – | 1 |
| Southern Miss | | – | | 7 | – | 2 | – | 0 |
| Syracuse | | – | | 7 | – | 3 | – | 0 |
| Virginia Tech | | – | | 7 | – | 3 | – | 0 |
| Georgia Tech | | – | | 7 | – | 3 | – | 1 |
| Boston College | | – | | 6 | – | 4 | – | 0 |
| West Texas State | | – | | 6 | – | 4 | – | 0 |
| Boston University | | – | | 5 | – | 3 | – | 1 |
| Buffalo | | – | | 5 | – | 3 | – | 2 |
| Miami (FL) | | – | | 5 | – | 4 | – | 1 |
| Penn State | | – | | 5 | – | 5 | – | 0 |
| Memphis State | | – | | 5 | – | 5 | – | 0 |
| San Jose State | | – | | 5 | – | 5 | – | 0 |
| Navy | | – | | 4 | – | 4 | – | 2 |
| Colgate | | – | | 4 | – | 5 | – | 1 |
| Florida State | | – | | 4 | – | 5 | – | 1 |
| Army | | – | | 4 | – | 5 | – | 1 |
| Houston | | – | | 4 | – | 5 | – | 1 |
| Colorado State | | – | | 4 | – | 6 | – | 0 |
| Air Force | | – | | 3 | – | 6 | – | 1 |
| Pittsburgh | | – | | 3 | – | 7 | – | 0 |
| Dayton | | – | | 3 | – | 7 | – | 0 |
| Holy Cross | | – | | 2 | – | 7 | – | 1 |
| Villanova | | – | | 1 | – | 8 | – | 0 |
Rankings from AP Poll

The 1965 Boston College Eagles football team represented Boston College as an independent during the 1965 NCAA University Division football season. Led by fourth-year head coach Jim Miller, the Eagles compiled a record of 6–4. Boston College played home games at Alumni Stadium in Chestnut Hill, Massachusetts.

== Schedule ==
| Date | Opponent | Site | Result | Attendance | Source |
|---|---|---|---|---|---|
| September 18 | Buffalo | Alumni Stadium; Chestnut Hill, MA | W 18–6 | 21,700 | |
| September 25 | Villanova | Alumni Stadium; Chestnut Hill, MA | W 28–0 | 22,500 | |
| October 2 | at Army | Michie Stadium; West Point, NY | L 0–10 | 31,000 | |
| October 9 | Penn State | Alumni Stadium; Chestnut Hill, MA | L 0–17 | 24,300 | |
| October 23 | Richmond | Alumni Stadium; Chestnut Hill, MA | W 38–7 | 24,722 | |
| October 30 | VMI | Alumni Stadium; Chestnut Hill, MA | W 41–12 | 20,127 | |
| November 5 | at Miami (FL) | Miami Orange Bowl; Miami, FL | L 6–27 | 28,704 | |
| November 13 | William & Mary | Alumni Stadium; Chestnut Hill, MA | W 30–17 | 17,527 | |
| November 20 | at Syracuse | Archbold Stadium; Syracuse, NY | L 13–21 | 20,000 | |
| November 27 | at Holy Cross | Fitton Field; Worcester, MA (rivalry) | W 35–0 | 23,909 | |
