= 1965 Georgia Tech Yellow Jackets football team =

American college football season

1965 Georgia Tech Yellow Jackets football

Gator Bowl champion

Gator Bowl, W 31–21 vs. Texas Tech
- Conference: Independent
- Record: 7–3–1
- Head coach: Bobby Dodd (21st season)
- Captains: John Battle; Tommy Bleick
- Home stadium: Grant Field

1965 NCAA University Division independents football records
	Conf.			Overall
Team	W	L	T	W		L		T
New Mexico State		–		8	–	2	–	0
Utah State		–		8	–	2	–	0
Xavier		–		8	–	2	–	0
Texas Western		–		8	–	3	–	0
No. 9 Notre Dame		–		7	–	2	–	1
Southern Miss		–		7	–	2	–	0
Syracuse		–		7	–	3	–	0
Virginia Tech		–		7	–	3	–	0
Georgia Tech		–		7	–	3	–	1
Boston College		–		6	–	4	–	0
West Texas State		–		6	–	4	–	0
Boston University		–		5	–	3	–	1
Buffalo		–		5	–	3	–	2
Miami (FL)		–		5	–	4	–	1
Penn State		–		5	–	5	–	0
Memphis State		–		5	–	5	–	0
San Jose State		–		5	–	5	–	0
Navy		–		4	–	4	–	2
Colgate		–		4	–	5	–	1
Florida State		–		4	–	5	–	1
Army		–		4	–	5	–	1
Houston		–		4	–	5	–	1
Colorado State		–		4	–	6	–	0
Air Force		–		3	–	6	–	1
Pittsburgh		–		3	–	7	–	0
Dayton		–		3	–	7	–	0
Holy Cross		–		2	–	7	–	1
Villanova		–		1	–	8	–	0
Rankings from AP Poll

The 1965 Georgia Tech Yellow Jackets football team represented the Georgia Institute of Technology as an independent during the 1965 NCAA University Division football season. The Yellow Jackets were led by 21st-year head coach Bobby Dodd, and played their home games at Grant Field in Atlanta. They competed as independents, finishing the regular season with a record of 6–3–1. They were invited to the 1965 Gator Bowl, where they defeated Texas Tech, 31–21.

== Schedule ==
Date	Opponent	Rank	Site	TV	Result	Attendance	Source
September 18	at Vanderbilt		Dudley Field; Nashville, TN (rivalry)		T 10–10	22,275	
September 25	Texas A&M		Grant Field; Atlanta, GA		L 10–14	45,843	
October 2	Clemson		Grant Field; Atlanta, GA (rivalry)		W 38–6	46,736	
October 9	at Tulane		Tulane Stadium; New Orleans, LA		W 13–10	35,000	
October 16	Auburn		Grant Field; Atlanta, GA (rivalry)		W 23–14	50,164	
October 23	Navy		Grant Field; Atlanta, GA		W 37–16	49,793	
October 30	Duke^{†}		Grant Field; Atlanta, GA	NBC	W 35–23	46,981	
November 6	at Tennessee	No. 7	Neyland Stadium; Knoxville, TN (rivalry)		L 7–21	52,174	
November 13	Virginia		Grant Field; Atlanta, GA		W 42–19	40,094	
November 27	Georgia		Grant Field; Atlanta, GA (Clean, Old-Fashioned Hate)		L 7–17	52,013	
December 31	vs. No. 10 Texas Tech		Gator Bowl Stadium; Jacksonville, FL (Gator Bowl)	ABC	W 31–21	60,127	
^{†}Homecoming; Rankings from AP Poll released prior to the game; Source:
