= 1965 New Mexico State Aggies football team =

American college football season

1965 New Mexico State Aggies football
- Conference: Independent
- Record: 8–2
- Head coach: Warren B. Woodson (8th season)
- Home stadium: Memorial Stadium

1965 NCAA University Division independents football records
	Conf.			Overall
Team	W	L	T	W		L		T
New Mexico State		–		8	–	2	–	0
Utah State		–		8	–	2	–	0
Xavier		–		8	–	2	–	0
Texas Western		–		8	–	3	–	0
No. 9 Notre Dame		–		7	–	2	–	1
Southern Miss		–		7	–	2	–	0
Syracuse		–		7	–	3	–	0
Virginia Tech		–		7	–	3	–	0
Georgia Tech		–		7	–	3	–	1
Boston College		–		6	–	4	–	0
West Texas State		–		6	–	4	–	0
Boston University		–		5	–	3	–	1
Buffalo		–		5	–	3	–	2
Miami (FL)		–		5	–	4	–	1
Penn State		–		5	–	5	–	0
Memphis State		–		5	–	5	–	0
San Jose State		–		5	–	5	–	0
Navy		–		4	–	4	–	2
Colgate		–		4	–	5	–	1
Florida State		–		4	–	5	–	1
Army		–		4	–	5	–	1
Houston		–		4	–	5	–	1
Colorado State		–		4	–	6	–	0
Air Force		–		3	–	6	–	1
Pittsburgh		–		3	–	7	–	0
Dayton		–		3	–	7	–	0
Holy Cross		–		2	–	7	–	1
Villanova		–		1	–	8	–	0
Rankings from AP Poll

The 1965 New Mexico State Aggies football team was an American football team representing New Mexico State University as an independent during the 1965 NCAA University Division football season. Led by head coach Warren B. Woodson in his eighth year, the Aggies achieved an 8–2 record and outscored their opponents with a total score of 236 to 153. The team played its four home games at Memorial Stadium in Las Cruces, New Mexico.

Statistical leaders for the team included quarterback Sal Olivas with 594 passing yards, running back Jim Bohl with 1,191 rushing yards (6.5-yard average), and wide receiver Hartwell Menefee with 571 receiving yards. Bohl ranked third nationally in rushing yardage among major-college players and also ranked second in scoring with (90 points scored.

The October 2 rivalry game against Texas Western attracted a crowd of 29,052, marking the largest attendance at a sporting event in El Paso, Texas, up to that date. The following month, the rivalry game against New Mexico drew a crowd of 17,500 spectators, which was the largest attendance for a football game in Las Cruces.

== Schedule ==
Date	Opponent	Site	Result	Attendance	Source
September 18	at Arlington State	Memorial Stadium; Arlington, TX	W 27–10	9,000	
September 25	Lamar Tech	Memorial Stadium; Las Cruces, NM	W 21–20	11,200	
October 2	at Texas Western	Sun Bowl; El Paso, TX (rivalry)	L 6–21	29,052	
October 9	at Pacific (CA)	Pacific Memorial Stadium; Stockton, CA	W 14–6	5,000	
October 16	at Wichita State	Veterans Field; Wichita, KS	W 45–20	10,800	
October 23	at West Texas State	Buffalo Bowl; Canyon, TX	W 10–2	17,700	
October 30	Eastern New Mexico^{†}	Memorial Stadium; Las Cruces, NM	W 41–7	15,000	
November 6	at Texas Tech	Jones Stadium; Lubbock, TX	L 9–48	28,750–28,753	
November 13	New Mexico	Memorial Stadium; Las Cruces, NM (rivalry)	W 20–6	17,500	
November 20	North Texas State	Memorial Stadium; Las Cruces, NM	W 43–13	> 10,000	
^{†}Homecoming
