= 1965 Boston University Terriers football team =

American college football season

1965 Boston University Terriers football
- Conference: Independent
- Record: 5–3–1
- Head coach: Warren Schmakel (2nd season)
- Home stadium: Nickerson Field

1965 NCAA University Division independents football records
	Conf.			Overall
Team	W	L	T	W		L		T
New Mexico State		–		8	–	2	–	0
Utah State		–		8	–	2	–	0
Xavier		–		8	–	2	–	0
Texas Western		–		8	–	3	–	0
No. 9 Notre Dame		–		7	–	2	–	1
Southern Miss		–		7	–	2	–	0
Syracuse		–		7	–	3	–	0
Virginia Tech		–		7	–	3	–	0
Georgia Tech		–		7	–	3	–	1
Boston College		–		6	–	4	–	0
West Texas State		–		6	–	4	–	0
Boston University		–		5	–	3	–	1
Buffalo		–		5	–	3	–	2
Miami (FL)		–		5	–	4	–	1
Penn State		–		5	–	5	–	0
Memphis State		–		5	–	5	–	0
San Jose State		–		5	–	5	–	0
Navy		–		4	–	4	–	2
Colgate		–		4	–	5	–	1
Florida State		–		4	–	5	–	1
Army		–		4	–	5	–	1
Houston		–		4	–	5	–	1
Colorado State		–		4	–	6	–	0
Air Force		–		3	–	6	–	1
Pittsburgh		–		3	–	7	–	0
Dayton		–		3	–	7	–	0
Holy Cross		–		2	–	7	–	1
Villanova		–		1	–	8	–	0
Rankings from AP Poll

The 1965 Boston University Terriers football team was an American football team that represented Boston University as an independent during the 1965 NCAA University Division football season. In its second season under head coach Warren Schmakel, the team compiled a 5–3–1 record, scored 140 points, and gave up 140 points.

== Schedule ==
Date	Opponent	Site	Result	Attendance	Source
September 25	Maine	Nickerson Field; Boston, MA	L 7–18	11,000	
October 2	at Temple	Temple Stadium; Philadelphia, PA	W 14–7	7,000–7,500	
October 9	at Buffalo	Rotary Field; Buffalo, NY	W 14–7	7,314	
October 16	at Holy Cross	Fitton Field; Worcester, MA	T 7–7	11,000–12,000	
October 23	UMass	Nickerson Field; Boston, MA	L 18–34	13,000	
October 30	Rutgers	Nickerson Field; Boston, MA	W 30–0	11,000	
November 6	Connecticut	Nickerson Field; Boston, MA	W 15–14	6,500	
November 13	at Delaware	Delaware Stadium; Newark, DE	L 7–50	7,800–7,874	
November 20	Rhode Island	Nickerson Field; Boston, MA	W 28–3	8,000	
