= 1965 Colorado State Rams football team =

American college football season

1965 Colorado State Rams football
- Conference: Independent
- Record: 4–6
- Head coach: Mike Lude (4th season)
- Home stadium: Colorado Field

1965 NCAA University Division independents football records
	Conf.			Overall
Team	W	L	T	W		L		T
New Mexico State		–		8	–	2	–	0
Utah State		–		8	–	2	–	0
Xavier		–		8	–	2	–	0
Texas Western		–		8	–	3	–	0
No. 9 Notre Dame		–		7	–	2	–	1
Southern Miss		–		7	–	2	–	0
Syracuse		–		7	–	3	–	0
Virginia Tech		–		7	–	3	–	0
Georgia Tech		–		7	–	3	–	1
Boston College		–		6	–	4	–	0
West Texas State		–		6	–	4	–	0
Boston University		–		5	–	3	–	1
Buffalo		–		5	–	3	–	2
Miami (FL)		–		5	–	4	–	1
Penn State		–		5	–	5	–	0
Memphis State		–		5	–	5	–	0
San Jose State		–		5	–	5	–	0
Navy		–		4	–	4	–	2
Colgate		–		4	–	5	–	1
Florida State		–		4	–	5	–	1
Army		–		4	–	5	–	1
Houston		–		4	–	5	–	1
Colorado State		–		4	–	6	–	0
Air Force		–		3	–	6	–	1
Pittsburgh		–		3	–	7	–	0
Dayton		–		3	–	7	–	0
Holy Cross		–		2	–	7	–	1
Villanova		–		1	–	8	–	0
Rankings from AP Poll

The 1965 Colorado State Rams football team represented Colorado State University as an independent during the 1965 NCAA University Division football season. In their fourth season under head coach Mike Lude, the Rams compiled a 4–6 record.

== Schedule ==
Date	Opponent	Site	Result	Attendance	Source
September 18	Hawaii	Colorado Field; Fort Collins, CO	W 54–6	11,700	
September 25	Wyoming	Colorado Field; Fort Collins, CO (rivalry)	L 14–33	14,355	
October 2	New Mexico	Colorado Field; Fort Collins, CO	W 27–22	13,500	
October 9	at Texas Western	Sun Bowl; El Paso, TX	L 10–35	20,102	
October 16	at West Texas State	Buffalo Bowl; Canyon, TX	L 12–15		
October 23	Utah State^{†}	Colorado Field; Fort Collins, CO	L 20–41	14,400	
October 30	at Utah	Ute Stadium; Salt Lake City, UT	L 19–22	17,065	
November 6	South Dakota State	Colorado Field; Fort Collins, CO	W 52–20	8,402	
November 13	at BYU	Cougar Stadium; Provo, UT	W 36–22	20,356	
November 25	at Tulsa	Skelly Stadium; Tulsa, OK	L 20–48	29,631	
^{†}Homecoming
