= 1965 Air Force Falcons football team =

American college football season

1965 Air Force Falcons football
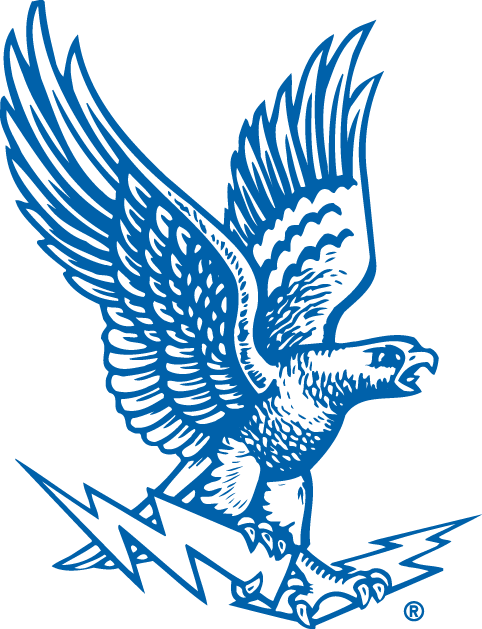
- Conference: Independent
- Record: 3–6–1
- Head coach: Ben Martin (8th season)
- Captain: Paul E. Stein
- Home stadium: Falcon Stadium

1965 NCAA University Division independents football records
	Conf.			Overall
Team	W	L	T	W		L		T
New Mexico State		–		8	–	2	–	0
Utah State		–		8	–	2	–	0
Xavier		–		8	–	2	–	0
Texas Western		–		8	–	3	–	0
No. 9 Notre Dame		–		7	–	2	–	1
Southern Miss		–		7	–	2	–	0
Syracuse		–		7	–	3	–	0
Virginia Tech		–		7	–	3	–	0
Georgia Tech		–		7	–	3	–	1
Boston College		–		6	–	4	–	0
West Texas State		–		6	–	4	–	0
Boston University		–		5	–	3	–	1
Buffalo		–		5	–	3	–	2
Miami (FL)		–		5	–	4	–	1
Penn State		–		5	–	5	–	0
Memphis State		–		5	–	5	–	0
San Jose State		–		5	–	5	–	0
Navy		–		4	–	4	–	2
Colgate		–		4	–	5	–	1
Florida State		–		4	–	5	–	1
Army		–		4	–	5	–	1
Houston		–		4	–	5	–	1
Colorado State		–		4	–	6	–	0
Air Force		–		3	–	6	–	1
Pittsburgh		–		3	–	7	–	0
Dayton		–		3	–	7	–	0
Holy Cross		–		2	–	7	–	1
Villanova		–		1	–	8	–	0
Rankings from AP Poll

The 1965 Air Force Falcons football team represented the United States Air Force Academy as an independent during the 1965 NCAA University Division football season. Led by eighth-year head coach Ben Martin, the Falcons compiled a record of 3–6–1 and outscored their opponents 166–156. Air Force played their home games at Falcon Stadium in Colorado Springs, Colorado.

== Schedule ==
Date	Opponent	Site	Result	Attendance	Source
September 18	at Wyoming	War Memorial Stadium; Laramie, WY	L 14–31	18,510	
September 25	No. 2 Nebraska	Falcon Stadium; Colorado Springs, CO	L 17–27	37,056	
October 2	Stanford	Falcon Stadium; Colorado Springs, CO	L 16–17	21,861	
October 9	California	Falcon Stadium; Colorado Springs, CO	L 7–24	29,470	
October 16	at Oregon	Multnomah Stadium; Portland, OR	T 18–18	20,677	
October 23	at Pacific (CA)	Pacific Memorial Stadium; Stockton, CA	W 40–0	11,000	
October 30	UCLA	Falcon Stadium; Colorado Springs, CO	L 0–10	28,234	
November 6	vs. Army	Soldier Field; Chicago, IL (rivalry)	W 14–3	55,000	
November 13	at Arizona	Arizona Stadium; Tucson, AZ	W 34–7	27,800	
November 20	Colorado	Falcon Stadium; Colorado Springs, CO	L 6–19	38,235	
Rankings from AP Poll released prior to the game; Source:
