= 1965 Xavier Musketeers football team =

American college football season

1965 Xavier Musketeers football
- Conference: Independent
- Record: 8–2
- Head coach: Ed Biles (4th season)
- Home stadium: Xavier Stadium

1965 NCAA University Division independents football records
	Conf.			Overall
Team	W	L	T	W		L		T
New Mexico State		–		8	–	2	–	0
Utah State		–		8	–	2	–	0
Xavier		–		8	–	2	–	0
Texas Western		–		8	–	3	–	0
No. 9 Notre Dame		–		7	–	2	–	1
Southern Miss		–		7	–	2	–	0
Syracuse		–		7	–	3	–	0
Virginia Tech		–		7	–	3	–	0
Georgia Tech		–		7	–	3	–	1
Boston College		–		6	–	4	–	0
West Texas State		–		6	–	4	–	0
Boston University		–		5	–	3	–	1
Buffalo		–		5	–	3	–	2
Miami (FL)		–		5	–	4	–	1
Penn State		–		5	–	5	–	0
Memphis State		–		5	–	5	–	0
San Jose State		–		5	–	5	–	0
Navy		–		4	–	4	–	2
Colgate		–		4	–	5	–	1
Florida State		–		4	–	5	–	1
Army		–		4	–	5	–	1
Houston		–		4	–	5	–	1
Colorado State		–		4	–	6	–	0
Air Force		–		3	–	6	–	1
Pittsburgh		–		3	–	7	–	0
Dayton		–		3	–	7	–	0
Holy Cross		–		2	–	7	–	1
Villanova		–		1	–	8	–	0
Rankings from AP Poll

The 1965 Xavier Musketeers football team was an American football team that represented Xavier University as an independent during the 1965 NCAA University Division football season. In its fourth season under head coach Ed Biles, the team compiled an 8–2 record and outscored opponents by a total of 217 to 155.

== Schedule ==
Date	Time	Opponent	Site	Result	Attendance	Source
September 18		Kent State	Xavier Stadium; Cincinnati, OH	W 21–14	12,235	
September 25		at Miami (OH)	Miami Field; Oxford, OH	W 29–28	12,927	
October 2	8:00 p.m.	Quantico Marines	Xavier Stadium; Cincinnati, OH	W 26–12		
October 9		at Cincinnati	Nippert Stadium; Cincinnati, OH (rivalry)	W 14–3	26,000	
October 16		at Ohio	Peden Stadium; Athens, OH	W 21–19	17,750	
October 23		at Chattanooga	Chamberlain Field; Chattanooga, TN	L 14–15	7,100–8,000	
October 30		Villanova^{†}	Xavier Stadium; Cincinnati, OH	W 35–0	12,000–13,072	
November 6		Dayton	Xavier Stadium; Cincinnati, OH	W 10–0	12,263	
November 13		Toledo	Xavier Stadium; Cincinnati, OH	W 14–7	11,239	
November 20		at Texas Western	Sun Bowl; El Paso, TX	L 33–57	20,114	
^{†}Homecoming; All times are in Eastern time
