= 1965 Memphis State Tigers football team =

American college football season

1965 Memphis State Tigers football
- Conference: Independent
- Record: 5–5
- Head coach: Billy J. Murphy (8th season)
- Captains: Don McClard; Billy Fletcher; Harry Day
- Home stadium: Memphis Memorial Stadium

1965 NCAA University Division independents football records
| | Conf. | | | Overall |
| Team | W | L | T | W | | L | | T |
|---|---|---|---|---|---|---|---|---|
| New Mexico State | | – | | 8 | – | 2 | – | 0 |
| Utah State | | – | | 8 | – | 2 | – | 0 |
| Xavier | | – | | 8 | – | 2 | – | 0 |
| Texas Western | | – | | 8 | – | 3 | – | 0 |
| No. 9 Notre Dame | | – | | 7 | – | 2 | – | 1 |
| Southern Miss | | – | | 7 | – | 2 | – | 0 |
| Syracuse | | – | | 7 | – | 3 | – | 0 |
| Virginia Tech | | – | | 7 | – | 3 | – | 0 |
| Georgia Tech | | – | | 7 | – | 3 | – | 1 |
| Boston College | | – | | 6 | – | 4 | – | 0 |
| West Texas State | | – | | 6 | – | 4 | – | 0 |
| Boston University | | – | | 5 | – | 3 | – | 1 |
| Buffalo | | – | | 5 | – | 3 | – | 2 |
| Miami (FL) | | – | | 5 | – | 4 | – | 1 |
| Penn State | | – | | 5 | – | 5 | – | 0 |
| Memphis State | | – | | 5 | – | 5 | – | 0 |
| San Jose State | | – | | 5 | – | 5 | – | 0 |
| Navy | | – | | 4 | – | 4 | – | 2 |
| Colgate | | – | | 4 | – | 5 | – | 1 |
| Florida State | | – | | 4 | – | 5 | – | 1 |
| Army | | – | | 4 | – | 5 | – | 1 |
| Houston | | – | | 4 | – | 5 | – | 1 |
| Colorado State | | – | | 4 | – | 6 | – | 0 |
| Air Force | | – | | 3 | – | 6 | – | 1 |
| Pittsburgh | | – | | 3 | – | 7 | – | 0 |
| Dayton | | – | | 3 | – | 7 | – | 0 |
| Holy Cross | | – | | 2 | – | 7 | – | 1 |
| Villanova | | – | | 1 | – | 8 | – | 0 |
Rankings from AP Poll

The 1965 Memphis State Tigers football team represented Memphis State College (now known as the University of Memphis) as an independent during the 1965 NCAA University Division football season. In its eighth season under head coach Billy J. Murphy, the team compiled a 5–5 record and outscored opponents by a total of 215 to 153. Don McClard, Billy Fletcher, and Harry Day were the team captains. The team played its home games at Memphis Memorial Stadium in Memphis, Tennessee.

The team's statistical leaders included Billy Fletcher with 1,239 passing yards and 556 rushing yards and Bob Sherlag with 673 receiving yards and 54 points scored.

== Schedule ==
| Date | Opponent | Site | Result | Attendance | Source |
|---|---|---|---|---|---|
| September 18 | Ole Miss | Memphis Memorial Stadium; Memphis, TN (rivalry) | L 14–34 | 50,160 | |
| September 25 | at Southern Miss | Mississippi Veterans Memorial Stadium; Jackson, MS (rivalry) | L 16–21 | 22,500 | |
| October 9 | at Tulsa | Skelly Stadium; Tulsa, OK | L 28–32 | 25,315 | |
| October 16 | No. 10 Mississippi State | Memphis Memorial Stadium; Memphis, TN | W 33–13 | 41,431 | |
| October 23 | at McNeese State | Cowboy Stadium; Lake Charles, LA | W 28–0 | 12,000 | |
| October 30 | West Texas State | Memphis Memorial Stadium; Memphis, TN | W 27–12 | 19,182 | |
| November 6 | Utah State | Memphis Memorial Stadium; Memphis, TN | W 7–0 | 23,876 | |
| November 13 | at North Texas State | Fouts Field; Denton, TX | W 28–0 | 5,000 | |
| November 20 | Wake Forest | Memphis Memorial Stadium; Memphis, TN | L 20–21 | 17,800 | |
| November 27 | at Quantico Marines | Butler Stadium; Quantico, VA | L 14–20 | 3,000 | |
Rankings from AP Poll released prior to the game
