= 1965 Miami Hurricanes football team =

American college football season

1965 Miami Hurricanes football
- Conference: Independent
- Record: 5–4–1
- Head coach: Charlie Tate (2nd season)
- MVP: Ed Weisacosky
- Home stadium: Miami Orange Bowl

1965 NCAA University Division independents football records
	Conf.			Overall
Team	W	L	T	W		L		T
New Mexico State		–		8	–	2	–	0
Utah State		–		8	–	2	–	0
Xavier		–		8	–	2	–	0
Texas Western		–		8	–	3	–	0
No. 9 Notre Dame		–		7	–	2	–	1
Southern Miss		–		7	–	2	–	0
Syracuse		–		7	–	3	–	0
Virginia Tech		–		7	–	3	–	0
Georgia Tech		–		7	–	3	–	1
Boston College		–		6	–	4	–	0
West Texas State		–		6	–	4	–	0
Boston University		–		5	–	3	–	1
Buffalo		–		5	–	3	–	2
Miami (FL)		–		5	–	4	–	1
Penn State		–		5	–	5	–	0
Memphis State		–		5	–	5	–	0
San Jose State		–		5	–	5	–	0
Navy		–		4	–	4	–	2
Colgate		–		4	–	5	–	1
Florida State		–		4	–	5	–	1
Army		–		4	–	5	–	1
Houston		–		4	–	5	–	1
Colorado State		–		4	–	6	–	0
Air Force		–		3	–	6	–	1
Pittsburgh		–		3	–	7	–	0
Dayton		–		3	–	7	–	0
Holy Cross		–		2	–	7	–	1
Villanova		–		1	–	8	–	0
Rankings from AP Poll

The 1965 Miami Hurricanes football team represented the University of Miami as an independent during the 1965 NCAA University Division football season. Led by second-year head coach Charlie Tate, the Hurricanes played their home games at the Miami Orange Bowl in Miami, Florida. Miami finished the season 5–4–1.

== Schedule ==
Date	Opponent	Site	Result	Attendance	Source
September 18	SMU	Miami Orange Bowl; Miami, FL	L 3–7	46,494	
September 25	at No. 9 Syracuse	Archbold Stadium; Syracuse, NY	W 24–0	31,000	
October 2	at Tulane	Tulane Stadium; New Orleans, LA	L 16–24	16,600–17,000	
October 9	LSU	Miami Orange Bowl; Miami, FL	L 27–34	43,367	
October 16	Houston	Miami Orange Bowl; Miami, FL	W 44–12	39,575	
October 23	at Pittsburgh	Pitt Stadium; Pittsburgh, PA	L 14–28	37,431	
November 5	Boston College	Miami Orange Bowl; Miami, FL	W 27–6	28,704	
November 13	at Vanderbilt	Dudley Field; Nashville, TN	W 28–14	12,996	
November 20	No. 10 Florida	Miami Orange Bowl; Miami, FL (rivalry)	W 16–13	67,762	
November 27	No. 6 Notre Dame	Miami Orange Bowl; Miami, FL (rivalry)	T 0–0	68,077	
Rankings from AP Poll released prior to the game; Source:

== Roster ==
- S Andy Sixkiller
