= 1965 Buffalo Bulls football team =

American college football season

1965 Buffalo Bulls football
- Conference: Independent
- Record: 5–3–2
- Head coach: Dick Offenhamer (11th season)
- Captain: Joe Holly
- Home stadium: Rotary Field

1965 NCAA University Division independents football records
	Conf.			Overall
Team	W	L	T	W		L		T
New Mexico State		–		8	–	2	–	0
Utah State		–		8	–	2	–	0
Xavier		–		8	–	2	–	0
Texas Western		–		8	–	3	–	0
No. 9 Notre Dame		–		7	–	2	–	1
Southern Miss		–		7	–	2	–	0
Syracuse		–		7	–	3	–	0
Virginia Tech		–		7	–	3	–	0
Georgia Tech		–		7	–	3	–	1
Boston College		–		6	–	4	–	0
West Texas State		–		6	–	4	–	0
Boston University		–		5	–	3	–	1
Buffalo		–		5	–	3	–	2
Miami (FL)		–		5	–	4	–	1
Penn State		–		5	–	5	–	0
Memphis State		–		5	–	5	–	0
San Jose State		–		5	–	5	–	0
Navy		–		4	–	4	–	2
Colgate		–		4	–	5	–	1
Florida State		–		4	–	5	–	1
Army		–		4	–	5	–	1
Houston		–		4	–	5	–	1
Colorado State		–		4	–	6	–	0
Air Force		–		3	–	6	–	1
Pittsburgh		–		3	–	7	–	0
Dayton		–		3	–	7	–	0
Holy Cross		–		2	–	7	–	1
Villanova		–		1	–	8	–	0
Rankings from AP Poll

The 1965 Buffalo Bulls football team represented the University at Buffalo as an independent during the 1965 NCAA University Division football season. Led by Dick Offenhamer in his 11th and final season as head coach, the Bulls compiled a record of 5–3–2. The team's offense scored 145 points while the defense allowed 78 points. Buffalo played home games at Rotary Field in Buffalo, New York.

== Schedule ==
Date	Opponent	Site	Result	Attendance	Source
September 18	at Boston College	Alumni Stadium; Chestnut Hill, MA	L 6–18	21,700	
September 25	Tampa	Rotary Field; Buffalo, NY	T 13–13	8,016	
October 2	at UMass	Alumni Stadium; Hadley, MA (rivalry)	W 18–6	10,200	
October 9	Boston University	Rotary Field; Buffalo, NY	L 7–14	7,314	
October 16	Richmond	Rotary Field; Buffalo, NY	W 24–0	7,705	
October 23	Dayton	Rotary Field; Buffalo, NY	T 0–0	6,096	
October 30	at Holy Cross	Fitton Field; Worcester, MA	L 7–20	7,500	
November 6	at Delaware	Delaware Stadium; Newark, DE	W 22–0	10,401	
November 13	Colgate	Rotary Field; Buffalo, NY	W 28–0	8,268	
November 20	at Villanova	Villanova Stadium; Villanova, PA	W 20–7	10,200	
