= 1965 San Jose State Spartans football team =

American college football season

1965 San Jose State Spartans football
- Conference: Independent
- Record: 5–5
- Head coach: Harry Anderson (1st season)
- Defensive coordinator: Ron McBride (1st season)
- Home stadium: Spartan Stadium

1965 NCAA University Division independents football records
	Conf.			Overall
Team	W	L	T	W		L		T
New Mexico State		–		8	–	2	–	0
Utah State		–		8	–	2	–	0
Xavier		–		8	–	2	–	0
Texas Western		–		8	–	3	–	0
No. 9 Notre Dame		–		7	–	2	–	1
Southern Miss		–		7	–	2	–	0
Syracuse		–		7	–	3	–	0
Virginia Tech		–		7	–	3	–	0
Georgia Tech		–		7	–	3	–	1
Boston College		–		6	–	4	–	0
West Texas State		–		6	–	4	–	0
Boston University		–		5	–	3	–	1
Buffalo		–		5	–	3	–	2
Miami (FL)		–		5	–	4	–	1
Penn State		–		5	–	5	–	0
Memphis State		–		5	–	5	–	0
San Jose State		–		5	–	5	–	0
Navy		–		4	–	4	–	2
Colgate		–		4	–	5	–	1
Florida State		–		4	–	5	–	1
Army		–		4	–	5	–	1
Houston		–		4	–	5	–	1
Colorado State		–		4	–	6	–	0
Air Force		–		3	–	6	–	1
Pittsburgh		–		3	–	7	–	0
Dayton		–		3	–	7	–	0
Holy Cross		–		2	–	7	–	1
Villanova		–		1	–	8	–	0
Rankings from AP Poll

The 1965 San Jose State Spartans football team represented San Jose State College—now known as San Jose State University—as an independent during the 1965 NCAA University Division football season. Led by first-year head coach Harry Anderson, the Spartans compiled a record of 5–5 and were outscored by opponents 192 to 184. The team played home games at Spartan Stadium in San Jose, California.

== Schedule ==
Date	Opponent	Site	Result	Attendance	Source
September 17	at Stanford	Stanford Stadium; Stanford, CA (rivalry)	L 6–26	31,031	
September 25	at Idaho	Neale Stadium; Moscow, ID	L 7–27	10,500	
October 2	Utah State	Spartan Stadium; San Jose, CA	L 8–35	16,000	
October 8	at BYU	Cougar Stadium; Provo, UT	L 7–34	19,559	
October 16	Arizona State	Spartan Stadium; San Jose, CA	W 21–14	13,600	
October 23	at Arizona	Arizona Stadium; Tucson, AZ	W 13–7	28,000–28,832	
October 30	at New Mexico	University Stadium; Albuquerque, NM	W 27–7	17,948	
November 6	Pacific (CA)^{†}	Spartan Stadium; San Jose, CA (Victory Bell)	W 52–21	17,300	
November 13	Montana State	Spartan Stadium; San Jose, CA	W 25–7	4,000–4,100	
November 20	at Fresno State	Ratcliffe Stadium; Fresno, CA (rivalry)	L 18–24	8,500	
^{†}Homecoming; Source:

== Team players in the NFL/AFL ==
The following San Jose State players were selected in the 1966 NFL draft.

Player	Position	Round	Overall	NFL team
Fred Heron	Defensive tackle, defensive end	3	45	Green Bay Packers
Mel Tom	Defensive end	6	89	Philadelphia Eagles
Ralph Wenzel	Guard	11	168	Green Bay Packers
Saint Saffold	Split end, wide receiver	15	222	San Francisco 49ers
Charley Harraway	Running back	18	273	Cleveland Browns

The following San Jose State players were selected in the 1966 American Football League draft.

Player	Position	Round	Overall	AFL team
Saint Saffold	Split end, wide receiver	RS7	62	San Diego Chargers
Mel Tom	Defensive end	RS9	80	Oakland Raiders
Charley Harraway	Running back	14	244	Kansas City Chiefs

The following finished their San Jose State career in 1965, were not drafted, but played in the AFL.

Player	Position	First AFL team
John Travis	Fullback	San Diego Chargers
