= 1965 Penn State Nittany Lions football team =

American college football season

1965 Penn State Nittany Lions football
- Conference: Independent
- Record: 5–5
- Head coach: Rip Engle (16th season)
- Captain: Bob Andronici
- Home stadium: Beaver Stadium

1965 NCAA University Division independents football records
	Conf.			Overall
Team	W	L	T	W		L		T
New Mexico State		–		8	–	2	–	0
Utah State		–		8	–	2	–	0
Xavier		–		8	–	2	–	0
Texas Western		–		8	–	3	–	0
No. 9 Notre Dame		–		7	–	2	–	1
Southern Miss		–		7	–	2	–	0
Syracuse		–		7	–	3	–	0
Virginia Tech		–		7	–	3	–	0
Georgia Tech		–		7	–	3	–	1
Boston College		–		6	–	4	–	0
West Texas State		–		6	–	4	–	0
Boston University		–		5	–	3	–	1
Buffalo		–		5	–	3	–	2
Miami (FL)		–		5	–	4	–	1
Penn State		–		5	–	5	–	0
Memphis State		–		5	–	5	–	0
San Jose State		–		5	–	5	–	0
Navy		–		4	–	4	–	2
Colgate		–		4	–	5	–	1
Florida State		–		4	–	5	–	1
Army		–		4	–	5	–	1
Houston		–		4	–	5	–	1
Colorado State		–		4	–	6	–	0
Air Force		–		3	–	6	–	1
Pittsburgh		–		3	–	7	–	0
Dayton		–		3	–	7	–	0
Holy Cross		–		2	–	7	–	1
Villanova		–		1	–	8	–	0
Rankings from AP Poll

The 1965 Penn State Nittany Lions football team represented Penn State University as an independent during the 1965 NCAA University Division football season. It was Rip Engle's last season as head coach of Penn State.

== Schedule ==
Date	Opponent	Site	Result	Attendance	Source
September 25	Michigan State	Beaver Stadium; University Park, PA (rivalry)	L 0–23	46,100	
October 2	UCLA	Beaver Stadium; University Park, PA	L 22–24	46,429	
October 9	at Boston College	Alumni Stadium; Chestnut Hill, MA	W 17–0	24,300	
October 16	at Syracuse	Archbold Stadium; Syracuse, NY (rivalry)	L 21–28	39,000	
October 23	West Virginia^{†}	Beaver Stadium; University Park, PA (rivalry)	W 44–6	44,230	
October 30	at California	California Memorial Stadium; Berkeley, CA	L 17–21	38,000	
November 6	Kent State	Beaver Stadium; University Park, PA	W 21–6	30,300	
November 13	Navy	Beaver Stadium; University Park, PA	W 14–6	47,100	
November 20	at Pittsburgh	Pitt Stadium; Pittsburgh, PA (rivalry)	L 27–30	35,567	
December 4	at Maryland	Byrd Stadium; College Park, MD (rivalry)	W 19–7	24,000	
^{†}Homecoming; Source:
