= 1965 Army Cadets football team =

American college football season

1965 Army Cadets football
- Conference: Independent
- Record: 4–5–1
- Head coach: Paul Dietzel (4th season)
- Captain: Sonny Stowers
- Home stadium: Michie Stadium

1965 NCAA University Division independents football records
	Conf.			Overall
Team	W	L	T	W		L		T
New Mexico State		–		8	–	2	–	0
Utah State		–		8	–	2	–	0
Xavier		–		8	–	2	–	0
Texas Western		–		8	–	3	–	0
No. 9 Notre Dame		–		7	–	2	–	1
Southern Miss		–		7	–	2	–	0
Syracuse		–		7	–	3	–	0
Virginia Tech		–		7	–	3	–	0
Georgia Tech		–		7	–	3	–	1
Boston College		–		6	–	4	–	0
West Texas State		–		6	–	4	–	0
Boston University		–		5	–	3	–	1
Buffalo		–		5	–	3	–	2
Miami (FL)		–		5	–	4	–	1
Penn State		–		5	–	5	–	0
Memphis State		–		5	–	5	–	0
San Jose State		–		5	–	5	–	0
Navy		–		4	–	4	–	2
Colgate		–		4	–	5	–	1
Florida State		–		4	–	5	–	1
Army		–		4	–	5	–	1
Houston		–		4	–	5	–	1
Colorado State		–		4	–	6	–	0
Air Force		–		3	–	6	–	1
Pittsburgh		–		3	–	7	–	0
Dayton		–		3	–	7	–	0
Holy Cross		–		2	–	7	–	1
Villanova		–		1	–	8	–	0
Rankings from AP Poll

The 1965 Army Cadets football team represented the United States Military Academy as an independent during the 1965 NCAA University Division football season. In their fourth year under head coach Paul Dietzel, the Cadets compiled a 4–5–1 record and were outscored by all opponents by a combined total of 132 to 119. In the annual Army–Navy Game, the Cadets tied the Midshipmen at a 7 to 7 score. The Cadets lost to Tennessee, Notre Dame, Stanford, Colgate, and Air Force.

No Army players were recognized on the 1965 College Football All-America Team.

== Schedule ==
Date	Time	Opponent	Site	Result	Attendance	Source
September 18		at Tennessee	Neyland Stadium; Knoxville, TN	L 0–21	48,500	
September 25		VMI	Michie Stadium; West Point, NY	W 21–7	21,000	
October 2		Boston College	Michie Stadium; West Point, NY	W 10–0	31,000	
October 9	8:00 p.m.	vs. Notre Dame	Shea Stadium; Flushing, NY (rivalry)	L 0–17	61,000	
October 16		Rutgers	Michie Stadium; West Point, NY	W 23–6	31,000	
October 23		at Stanford	Stanford Stadium; Stanford, CA	L 14–31	56,000	
October 30		Colgate	Michie Stadium; West Point, NY	L 28–29	30,800	
November 6		vs. Air Force	Soldier Field; Chicago, IL (rivalry)	L 3–14	55,000	
November 13		Wyoming	Michie Stadium; West Point, NY	W 13–0	25,000	
November 27		vs. Navy	John F. Kennedy Stadium; Philadelphia, PA (Army–Navy Game)	T 7–7	102,000	
All times are in Eastern time; Source:

== Roster ==
- Sonny Stowers
