= 1965 Florida State Seminoles football team =

American college football season

1965 Florida State Seminoles football
- Conference: Independent
- Record: 4–5–1
- Head coach: Bill Peterson (6th season)
- Offensive coordinator: Bill Crutchfield (2nd season)
- Offensive scheme: Pro set
- Defensive coordinator: Don James (4th season)
- Base defense: 4–3
- Captains: Bill McDowell; Max Wettstein
- Home stadium: Doak Campbell Stadium

1965 NCAA University Division independents football records
| | Conf. | | | Overall |
| Team | W | L | T | W | | L | | T |
|---|---|---|---|---|---|---|---|---|
| New Mexico State | | – | | 8 | – | 2 | – | 0 |
| Utah State | | – | | 8 | – | 2 | – | 0 |
| Xavier | | – | | 8 | – | 2 | – | 0 |
| Texas Western | | – | | 8 | – | 3 | – | 0 |
| No. 9 Notre Dame | | – | | 7 | – | 2 | – | 1 |
| Southern Miss | | – | | 7 | – | 2 | – | 0 |
| Syracuse | | – | | 7 | – | 3 | – | 0 |
| Virginia Tech | | – | | 7 | – | 3 | – | 0 |
| Georgia Tech | | – | | 7 | – | 3 | – | 1 |
| Boston College | | – | | 6 | – | 4 | – | 0 |
| West Texas State | | – | | 6 | – | 4 | – | 0 |
| Boston University | | – | | 5 | – | 3 | – | 1 |
| Buffalo | | – | | 5 | – | 3 | – | 2 |
| Miami (FL) | | – | | 5 | – | 4 | – | 1 |
| Penn State | | – | | 5 | – | 5 | – | 0 |
| Memphis State | | – | | 5 | – | 5 | – | 0 |
| San Jose State | | – | | 5 | – | 5 | – | 0 |
| Navy | | – | | 4 | – | 4 | – | 2 |
| Colgate | | – | | 4 | – | 5 | – | 1 |
| Florida State | | – | | 4 | – | 5 | – | 1 |
| Army | | – | | 4 | – | 5 | – | 1 |
| Houston | | – | | 4 | – | 5 | – | 1 |
| Colorado State | | – | | 4 | – | 6 | – | 0 |
| Air Force | | – | | 3 | – | 6 | – | 1 |
| Pittsburgh | | – | | 3 | – | 7 | – | 0 |
| Dayton | | – | | 3 | – | 7 | – | 0 |
| Holy Cross | | – | | 2 | – | 7 | – | 1 |
| Villanova | | – | | 1 | – | 8 | – | 0 |
Rankings from AP Poll

The 1965 Florida State Seminoles football team represented Florida State University as an independent during the 1965 NCAA University Division football season. Led by sixth-year head coach Bill Peterson, the Seminoles compiled a record of 4–5–1.

== Schedule ==
| Date | Opponent | Site | Result | Attendance | Source |
|---|---|---|---|---|---|
| September 25 | at TCU | Amon G. Carter Stadium; Fort Worth, TX | L 3–7 | 18,506 | |
| October 2 | Baylor | Doak Campbell Stadium; Tallahassee, FL | W 9–7 | 28,900 | |
| October 9 | at Kentucky | McLean Stadium; Lexington, KY | L 24–26 | 37,500 | |
| October 16 | No. 5 Georgia | Doak Campbell Stadium; Tallahassee, FL | W 10–3 | 40,112 | |
| October 23 | at No. 2 Alabama | Denny Stadium; Tuscaloosa, AL | L 0–21 | 43,066 | |
| October 30 | Virginia Tech | Doak Campbell Stadium; Tallahassee, FL | W 7–6 | 22,536 | |
| November 6 | Wake Forest | Doak Campbell Stadium; Tallahassee, FL | W 35–0 | 25,600 | |
| November 13 | at NC State | Riddick Stadium; Raleigh, NC | L 0–3 | 22,000 | |
| November 20 | Houston | Doak Campbell Stadium; Tallahassee, FL | T 16–16 | 25,135 | |
| November 27 | at Florida | Florida Field; Gainesville, FL (rivalry) | L 17–30 | 48,626–49,513 | |
Rankings from AP Poll released prior to the game; Source:
