= 1965 Notre Dame Fighting Irish football team =

American college football season

1965 Notre Dame Fighting Irish football
- Conference: Independent

Ranking
- Coaches: No. 9
- AP: No. 9
- Record: 7–2–1
- Head coach: Ara Parseghian (2nd season)
- Captain: Phil Sheridan
- Home stadium: Notre Dame Stadium

1965 NCAA University Division independents football records
	Conf.			Overall
Team	W	L	T	W		L		T
New Mexico State		–		8	–	2	–	0
Utah State		–		8	–	2	–	0
Xavier		–		8	–	2	–	0
Texas Western		–		8	–	3	–	0
No. 9 Notre Dame		–		7	–	2	–	1
Southern Miss		–		7	–	2	–	0
Syracuse		–		7	–	3	–	0
Virginia Tech		–		7	–	3	–	0
Georgia Tech		–		7	–	3	–	1
Boston College		–		6	–	4	–	0
West Texas State		–		6	–	4	–	0
Boston University		–		5	–	3	–	1
Buffalo		–		5	–	3	–	2
Miami (FL)		–		5	–	4	–	1
Penn State		–		5	–	5	–	0
Memphis State		–		5	–	5	–	0
San Jose State		–		5	–	5	–	0
Navy		–		4	–	4	–	2
Colgate		–		4	–	5	–	1
Florida State		–		4	–	5	–	1
Army		–		4	–	5	–	1
Houston		–		4	–	5	–	1
Colorado State		–		4	–	6	–	0
Air Force		–		3	–	6	–	1
Pittsburgh		–		3	–	7	–	0
Dayton		–		3	–	7	–	0
Holy Cross		–		2	–	7	–	1
Villanova		–		1	–	8	–	0
Rankings from AP Poll

The 1965 Notre Dame Fighting Irish football team was an American football team that represented the University of Notre Dame as an independent during the 1965 NCAA University Division football season. In their second year under head coach Ara Parseghian, the Fighting Irish compiled a 7–2–1 record, outscored opponents by a total of 270 to 73, and were ranked No. 9 in the final AP and UPI polls. In three games against ranked opponents, they lost to No 6 Purdue and No. 1 Michigan State and defeated No. 4 USC.

Guard Dick Arrington and defensive back Nick Rassas were both consensus first-team picks on the 1965 All-America college football team. Fullback Bill Wolski also received first-team honors from Football News. The team's statistical leaders included Wolski (48 points scored), quarterback Bill Zloch (558 passing yards), and Nick Eddy (572 rushing yards, 233 receiving yards).

The team played its home games at Notre Dame Stadium in Notre Dame, Indiana.

== Schedule ==
Date	Time	Opponent	Rank	Site	TV	Result	Attendance	Source
September 18	4:30pm	at California	No. 3	California Memorial Stadium; Berkeley, CA	NBC	W 48–6	53,000	
September 25	2:30pm	at No. 6 Purdue	No. 1	Ross–Ade Stadium; West Lafayette, IN (rivalry)		L 21–25	61,291	
October 2	2:30pm	Northwestern	No. 8	Notre Dame Stadium; Notre Dame, IN (rivalry)		W 38–7	59,273	
October 9	8:00pm	vs. Army	No. 7	Shea Stadium; Flushing, NY (rivalry)		W 17–0	61,000	
October 23	2:30pm	No. 4 USC	No. 7	Notre Dame Stadium; Notre Dame, IN (rivalry)	NBC	W 28–7	59,235	
October 30	2:30pm	Navy	No. 4	Notre Dame Stadium; Notre Dame, IN (rivalry)		W 29–3	59,206	
November 6	1:30pm	at Pittsburgh	No. 4	Pitt Stadium; Pittsburgh, PA (rivalry)		W 69–13	57,169	
November 13	1:30pm	North Carolina	No. 4	Notre Dame Stadium; Notre Dame, IN (rivalry)		W 17–0	59,216	
November 20	1:30pm	No. 1 Michigan State	No. 4	Notre Dame Stadium; Notre Dame, IN (rivalry)		L 3–12	59,291	
November 27	8:00pm	at Miami (FL)	No. 6	Miami Orange Bowl; Miami, FL (rivalry)		T 0–0	68,077	
Rankings from AP Poll released prior to the game; All times are in Eastern time; Source:

== Game summaries ==
=== California ===
Team	1	2	3	4	Total
• Notre Dame	9	19	13	7	48
California	0	6	0	0	6

- Date: September 18
- Location: California Memorial Stadium, Berkeley, CA
- Game start: 1:30 p.m. PDT
- Game attendance: 53,000
- Television network: NBC

Scoring summary
1	ND	Ivan 28-yard field goal	ND 3-0
1	ND	Zloch 3-yard run (kick failed)	ND 9-0
2	ND	Conjar 1-yard run (Ivan kick)	ND 16-0
2	ND	Rassas 65-yard punt return (2-pt failed)	ND 22-0
2	Cal	Bradley 7-yard pass from Berry (kick failed)	ND 22-6
2	ND	Zloch 11-yard run (2-pt failed)	ND 28-6
3	ND	Eddy 24-yard pass from Zloch (kick failed)	ND 34-6
3	ND	Wolski 6-yard run (Ivan kick)	ND 41-6
4	ND	Harshman 3-yard run (Ivan kick)	ND 48-6

=== Purdue ===
Team	1	2	3	4	Total
Notre Dame	3	7	8	3	21
• Purdue	0	12	6	7	25

- Date: September 25
- Location: Ross-Ade Stadium, West Lafayette, IN
- Game start: 1:30 p.m. CDT

Scoring summary
1	ND	Ivan 27-yard field goal	ND 3-0
2	PU	Beirne 28-yard pass from Griese (kick failed)	PU 3-6
2	ND	Eddy 4-yard run (Ivan kick)	ND 10-6
2	PU	Beirne 14-yard pass from Griese (2-pt failed)	PU 10-12
3	PU	Minniear 12-yard pass from Griese (2-pt failed)	PU 10-18
3	ND	Wolski 54-yard run (2-pt good)	Tied 18-18
4	ND	Ivan 24-yard field goal	ND 21-18
4	PU	Teter 3-yard run (Griese kick)	PU 21-25

=== Northwestern ===
Team	1	2	3	4	Total
Northwestern	7	0	0	0	7
• Notre Dame	0	6	8	24	38

- Date: October 2
- Location: Notre Dame Stadium, South Bend, IN
- Game start: 1:30 pm EST

Scoring summary
1	NW	Clark 50-yard interception return (Dickie kick)	NW 0-7
2	ND	Wolski 7-yard run (kick failed)	NW 6-7
3	ND	Rassas 92-yard interception return (2-pt good)	ND 14-7
4	ND	Ivan 26-yard field goal	ND 17-7
4	ND	Rassas 72-yard punt return (Ivan kick)	ND 24-7
4	ND	May 1-yard run (Ivan kick)	ND 31-7
4	ND	Bleier 13-yard run (Ivan kick)	ND 38-7

=== Army ===
Team	1	2	3	4	Total
• Notre Dame	0	7	7	3	17
Army	0	0	0	0	0

- Date: October 9
- Location: Shea Stadium, New York, NY
- Game start: 8:00 pm EDT
- Game attendance: 61,000

Scoring summary
2	ND	Don Gmitter 29-yard pass from Tom Schoen (Ken Ivan kick)	ND 7-0
3	ND	Nick Eddy 5-yard run (Ken Ivan kick)	ND 14-0
4	ND	Ken Ivan 23-yard field goal	ND 17-0

=== USC ===
Team	1	2	3	4	Total
USC	0	0	0	7	7
• Notre Dame	14	7	7	0	28

- Date: October 23
- Location: Notre Dame Stadium, South Bend, IN
- Game start: 1:30 p.m. EST
- Television network: NBC

Scoring summary
1	ND	Conjar 1-yard run (Ivan kick)	ND 7-0
1	ND	Conjar 2-yard run (Ivan kick)	ND 14-0
2	ND	Conjar 1-yard run (Ivan kick)	ND 21-0
3	ND	Conjar 2-yard run (Ivan kick)	ND 28-0
4	USC	Thomas 8-yard pass from Winslow (Rossovich kick)	ND 28-7

=== Navy ===
Team	1	2	3	4	Total
Navy	0	3	0	0	3
• Notre Dame	0	7	22	0	29

- Date: October 30
- Location: Notre Dame Stadium, South Bend, IN
- Game start: 1:30 p.m. EST

Scoring summary
2	Navy	Hoch 29-yard field goal	Navy 0-3
2	ND	Eddy 55-yard pass from Zloch (Ivan kick)	ND 7-3
3	ND	Zloch 1-yard run (Ivan kick)	ND 14-3
3	ND	Conjar 1-yard run (Ivan kick)	ND 21-3
3	ND	Rassas 66-yard punt return (2-pt. good)	ND 29-3

=== Pittsburgh ===
Team	1	2	3	4	Total
• Notre Dame	21	14	20	14	69
Pittsburgh	0	6	0	7	13

- Date: November 6
- Location: Pitt Stadium, Pittsburgh, PA
- Game start: 1:30 pm EST

Scoring summary
1	ND	Conjar 42-yard run (Ivan kick)	ND 7-0
1	ND	Wolski 7-yard run (Ivan kick)	ND 14-0
1	ND	Wolski 5-yard run (Ivan kick)	ND 21-0
2	ND	Wolski 5-yard run (Ivan kick)	ND 28-0
2	ND	Wolski 1-yard run (Ivan kick)	ND 35-0
2	Pitt	Dyer 21-yard pass from Lucas (kick blocked)	ND 35-6
3	ND	Wolski 1-yard run (Ivan kick)	ND 42-6
3	ND	Gmitter 44-yard pass from Zloch (kick blocked)	ND 48-6
3	ND	May 5-yard run (Ivan kick)	ND 55-6
4	ND	Bleier 3-yard run (Ivan kick)	ND 62-6
4	ND	Conway 2-yard run (Ivan kick)	ND 69-6
4	Pitt	Zalansky 5-yard pass from James (Jones kick)	ND 69-13

=== North Carolina ===
Team	1	2	3	4	Total
N. Carolina	0	0	0	0	0
• Notre Dame	0	0	0	17	17

- Date: November 13
- Location: Notre Dame Stadium, South Bend, IN
- Game start: 1:30 p.m. EST

Scoring summary
4	ND	Ivan 38-yard field goal	ND 3-0
4	ND	Eddy 66-yard run (Ivan kick)	ND 10-0
4	ND	Eddy 3-yard run (Ivan kick)	ND 17-0

=== Michigan State ===
Team	1	2	3	4	Total
• Michigan St.	0	0	6	6	12
Notre Dame	3	0	0	0	3

- Date: November 20
- Location: Notre Dame Stadium, South Bend, IN
- Game start: 1:30 p.m. EST

Scoring summary
1	ND	Ivan 22-yard field goal	ND 3-0
3	MSU	Jones 3-yard run (kick failed)	MSU 3-6
4	MSU	Lee 19-yard pass from Juday (2-pt. failed)	MSU 3-12

=== Miami (Florida) ===
Notre Dame outgained Miami, 175 yards to 87 (including 115 yards rushing to negative 17), but missed field goals of 22 and 27 yards. The latter miss came with 5:15 left in the game, after a drive that had advanced to the Miami 3 yard line before going backwards. Miami had no serious scoring threats and only once made it as far as the ND 42 yard line.

Team	1	2	3	4	Total
Notre Dame	0	0	0	0	0
Miami	0	0	0	0	0

- Date: November 27
- Location: Miami Orange Bowl
- Game start: 8:00 p.m. EST
- Game weather: 73 degrees
