= 1965 Syracuse Orangemen football team =

American college football season

1965 Syracuse Orangemen football
- Conference: Independent

Ranking
- Coaches: No. 19
- Record: 7–3
- Head coach: Ben Schwartzwalder (17th season)
- Captain: Harris Elliott
- Home stadium: Archbold Stadium

1965 NCAA University Division independents football records
	Conf.			Overall
Team	W	L	T	W		L		T
New Mexico State		–		8	–	2	–	0
Utah State		–		8	–	2	–	0
Xavier		–		8	–	2	–	0
Texas Western		–		8	–	3	–	0
No. 9 Notre Dame		–		7	–	2	–	1
Southern Miss		–		7	–	2	–	0
Syracuse		–		7	–	3	–	0
Virginia Tech		–		7	–	3	–	0
Georgia Tech		–		7	–	3	–	1
Boston College		–		6	–	4	–	0
West Texas State		–		6	–	4	–	0
Boston University		–		5	–	3	–	1
Buffalo		–		5	–	3	–	2
Miami (FL)		–		5	–	4	–	1
Penn State		–		5	–	5	–	0
Memphis State		–		5	–	5	–	0
San Jose State		–		5	–	5	–	0
Navy		–		4	–	4	–	2
Colgate		–		4	–	5	–	1
Florida State		–		4	–	5	–	1
Army		–		4	–	5	–	1
Houston		–		4	–	5	–	1
Colorado State		–		4	–	6	–	0
Air Force		–		3	–	6	–	1
Pittsburgh		–		3	–	7	–	0
Dayton		–		3	–	7	–	0
Holy Cross		–		2	–	7	–	1
Villanova		–		1	–	8	–	0
Rankings from AP Poll

The 1965 Syracuse Orangemen football team represented Syracuse University as an independent during the 1965 NCAA University Division football season. The Orangemen were led by 17th-year head coach Ben Schwartzwalder and played their home games at Archbold Stadium in Syracuse, New York. Syracuse finished the regular season with a record of 7–3 and ranked 19th in the Coaches Poll. They were not invited to a bowl game.

== Schedule ==
Date	Opponent	Rank	Site	Result	Attendance	Source
September 18	at Navy		Navy–Marine Corps Memorial Stadium; Annapolis, MD	W 14–6	20,367	
September 25	Miami (FL)	No. 9	Archbold Stadium; Syracuse, NY	L 0–24	31,000	
October 2	at Maryland		Byrd Stadium; College Park, MD	W 24–7	35,000	
October 9	at UCLA		Los Angeles Memorial Coliseum; Los Angeles, CA	L 14–24	27,729	
October 16	Penn State		Archbold Stadium; Syracuse, NY (rivalry)	W 28–21	39,000	
October 23	Holy Cross		Archbold Stadium; Syracuse, NY	W 32–6	15,000	
October 30	vs. Pittsburgh		Shea Stadium; Flushing, NY (rivalry)	W 51–13	24,590	
November 6	Oregon State		Archbold Stadium; Syracuse, NY	L 12–13	33,000	
November 13	at West Virginia		Mountaineer Field; Morgantown, WV (rivalry)	W 41–19	33,500	
November 20	Boston College		Archbold Stadium; Syracuse, NY	W 21–13	20,000	
Rankings from AP Poll released prior to the game; Source:
