= 1965 Villanova Wildcats football team =

American college football season

1965 Villanova Wildcats football
- Conference: Independent
- Record: 1–8
- Head coach: Alexander F. Bell (6th season)
- Captain: Thomas Brown
- Home stadium: Villanova Stadium

1965 NCAA University Division independents football records
	Conf.			Overall
Team	W	L	T	W		L		T
New Mexico State		–		8	–	2	–	0
Utah State		–		8	–	2	–	0
Xavier		–		8	–	2	–	0
Texas Western		–		8	–	3	–	0
No. 9 Notre Dame		–		7	–	2	–	1
Southern Miss		–		7	–	2	–	0
Syracuse		–		7	–	3	–	0
Virginia Tech		–		7	–	3	–	0
Georgia Tech		–		7	–	3	–	1
Boston College		–		6	–	4	–	0
West Texas State		–		6	–	4	–	0
Boston University		–		5	–	3	–	1
Buffalo		–		5	–	3	–	2
Miami (FL)		–		5	–	4	–	1
Penn State		–		5	–	5	–	0
Memphis State		–		5	–	5	–	0
San Jose State		–		5	–	5	–	0
Navy		–		4	–	4	–	2
Colgate		–		4	–	5	–	1
Florida State		–		4	–	5	–	1
Army		–		4	–	5	–	1
Houston		–		4	–	5	–	1
Colorado State		–		4	–	6	–	0
Air Force		–		3	–	6	–	1
Pittsburgh		–		3	–	7	–	0
Dayton		–		3	–	7	–	0
Holy Cross		–		2	–	7	–	1
Villanova		–		1	–	8	–	0
Rankings from AP Poll

The 1965 Villanova Wildcats football team represented the Villanova University during the 1965 NCAA University Division football season. The head coach was Alexander F. Bell, coaching his sixth season with the Wildcats. The team played their home games at Villanova Stadium in Villanova, Pennsylvania.

== Schedule ==
Date	Time	Opponent	Site	Result	Attendance	Source
September 18		Toledo*	Villanova Stadium; Villanova, PA	L 7–9	8,200	
September 25		at Boston College	Alumni Stadium; Chestnut Hill, MA	L 0–28	22,500	
October 9		at Washington State	Joe Albi Stadium; Spokane, WA	L 14–24	14,500	
October 16		at Delaware	Delaware Stadium; Newark, DE (rivalry)	L 21–24	12,288–12,388	
October 23		West Chester	Villanova Stadium; Villanova, PA	W 28–13	12,500	
October 30		at Xavier	Corcoran Stadium; Cincinnati, OH	L 0–35	12,000–13,072	
November 6	1:30 p.m.	Quantico Marines*	Villanova Stadium; Villanova, PA	L 7–32	7,400	
November 13		at Virginia Tech	Lane Stadium; Blacksburg, VA	L 19–21	15,000	
November 20		at Buffalo*	Rotary Field; Buffalo, NY	L 7–20	10,200–10,400	
*Non-conference game; All times are in Eastern time; Source:
