= 1965 Houston Cougars football team =

American college football season

1965 Houston Cougars football
- Conference: Independent
- Record: 4–5–1
- Head coach: Bill Yeoman (4th season)
- Defensive coordinator: Melvin Robertson (1st season)
- Captain: Cotton Guerrant
- Home stadium: Astrodome

1965 NCAA University Division independents football records
	Conf.			Overall
Team	W	L	T	W		L		T
New Mexico State		–		8	–	2	–	0
Utah State		–		8	–	2	–	0
Xavier		–		8	–	2	–	0
Texas Western		–		8	–	3	–	0
No. 9 Notre Dame		–		7	–	2	–	1
Southern Miss		–		7	–	2	–	0
Syracuse		–		7	–	3	–	0
Virginia Tech		–		7	–	3	–	0
Georgia Tech		–		7	–	3	–	1
Boston College		–		6	–	4	–	0
West Texas State		–		6	–	4	–	0
Boston University		–		5	–	3	–	1
Buffalo		–		5	–	3	–	2
Miami (FL)		–		5	–	4	–	1
Penn State		–		5	–	5	–	0
Memphis State		–		5	–	5	–	0
San Jose State		–		5	–	5	–	0
Navy		–		4	–	4	–	2
Colgate		–		4	–	5	–	1
Florida State		–		4	–	5	–	1
Army		–		4	–	5	–	1
Houston		–		4	–	5	–	1
Colorado State		–		4	–	6	–	0
Air Force		–		3	–	6	–	1
Pittsburgh		–		3	–	7	–	0
Dayton		–		3	–	7	–	0
Holy Cross		–		2	–	7	–	1
Villanova		–		1	–	8	–	0
Rankings from AP Poll

The 1965 Houston Cougars football team was an American football team that represented the University of Houston as an independent during the 1965 NCAA University Division football season. In its fourth season under head coach Bill Yeoman, the team compiled a 4–5–1 record. Cotton Guerrant was the team captain. The team played its home games at the Astrodome in Houston

== Schedule ==
Date	Opponent	Site	Result	Attendance	Source
September 11	Tulsa	Astrodome; Houston, TX	L 0–14	37,138	
September 18	Mississippi State	Astrodome; Houston, TX	L 0–36	37,216	
September 24	Cincinnati	Astrodome; Houston, TX	W 21–6	27,576	
October 9	at Texas A&M	Kyle Field; College Station, TX	L 7–10	35,000	
October 16	at Miami (FL)	Miami Orange Bowl; Miami, FL	L 12–44	39,575	
October 23	at Tennessee	Neyland Stadium; Knoxville, TN	L 8–17	34,504	
October 30	Chattanooga	Astrodome; Houston, TX	W 40–7	32,320–32,731	
November 6	Ole Miss^{†}	Astrodome; Houston, TX	W 17–3	38,197	
November 13	No. 10 Kentucky	Astrodome; Houston, TX	W 38–21	37,248	
November 20	at Florida State	Doak Campbell Stadium; Tallahassee, FL	T 16–16	25,135	
^{†}Homecoming; Rankings from AP Poll released prior to the game
