= 1965 Texas Western Miners football team =

American college football season

1965 Texas Western Miners football

Sun Bowl champion

Sun Bowl, W 13–12 vs. TCU
- Conference: Independent
- Record: 8–3
- Head coach: Bobby Dobbs (1st season)
- Home stadium: Sun Bowl

1965 NCAA University Division independents football records
| | Conf. | | | Overall |
| Team | W | L | T | W | | L | | T |
|---|---|---|---|---|---|---|---|---|
| New Mexico State | | – | | 8 | – | 2 | – | 0 |
| Utah State | | – | | 8 | – | 2 | – | 0 |
| Xavier | | – | | 8 | – | 2 | – | 0 |
| Texas Western | | – | | 8 | – | 3 | – | 0 |
| No. 9 Notre Dame | | – | | 7 | – | 2 | – | 1 |
| Southern Miss | | – | | 7 | – | 2 | – | 0 |
| Syracuse | | – | | 7 | – | 3 | – | 0 |
| Virginia Tech | | – | | 7 | – | 3 | – | 0 |
| Georgia Tech | | – | | 7 | – | 3 | – | 1 |
| Boston College | | – | | 6 | – | 4 | – | 0 |
| West Texas State | | – | | 6 | – | 4 | – | 0 |
| Boston University | | – | | 5 | – | 3 | – | 1 |
| Buffalo | | – | | 5 | – | 3 | – | 2 |
| Miami (FL) | | – | | 5 | – | 4 | – | 1 |
| Penn State | | – | | 5 | – | 5 | – | 0 |
| Memphis State | | – | | 5 | – | 5 | – | 0 |
| San Jose State | | – | | 5 | – | 5 | – | 0 |
| Navy | | – | | 4 | – | 4 | – | 2 |
| Colgate | | – | | 4 | – | 5 | – | 1 |
| Florida State | | – | | 4 | – | 5 | – | 1 |
| Army | | – | | 4 | – | 5 | – | 1 |
| Houston | | – | | 4 | – | 5 | – | 1 |
| Colorado State | | – | | 4 | – | 6 | – | 0 |
| Air Force | | – | | 3 | – | 6 | – | 1 |
| Pittsburgh | | – | | 3 | – | 7 | – | 0 |
| Dayton | | – | | 3 | – | 7 | – | 0 |
| Holy Cross | | – | | 2 | – | 7 | – | 1 |
| Villanova | | – | | 1 | – | 8 | – | 0 |
Rankings from AP Poll

The 1965 Texas Western Miners football team was an American football team that represented Texas Western College (now known as the University of Texas at El Paso) as an independent during the 1965 NCAA University Division football season. In its first season under head coach Bobby Dobbs, the team compiled an 8–3 record, defeated TCU in the 1965 Sun Bowl, and outscored all opponents by a total of 317 to 206.

== Schedule ==
| Date | Opponent | Site | Result | Attendance | Source |
|---|---|---|---|---|---|
| September 18 | North Texas State | Sun Bowl; El Paso, TX | W 61–15 | 22,515 | |
| September 25 | at New Mexico | University Stadium; Albuquerque, NM | W 35–14 | 29,952 | |
| October 2 | New Mexico State | Sun Bowl; El Paso, TX (rivalry) | W 21–6 | 29,052 | |
| October 9 | Colorado State^{†} | Sun Bowl; El Paso, TX | W 35–10 | 20,102 | |
| October 16 | at Wyoming | War Memorial Stadium; Laramie, WY | L 14–38 | 16,747 | |
| October 30 | Arizona State | Sun Bowl; El Paso, TX | L 20–28 | 25,753 | |
| November 6 | at Arizona | Arizona Stadium; Tucson, AZ | L 3–10 | 24,500 | |
| November 13 | at Utah | Ute Stadium; Salt Lake City, UT | W 20–19 | 8,833 | |
| November 20 | Xavier | Sun Bowl; El Paso, TX | W 57–33 | 20,114 | |
| November 27 | West Texas State | Sun Bowl; El Paso, TX | W 38–21 | 14,767 | |
| December 31 | TCU | Sun Bowl; El Paso, TX (Sun Bowl) | W 13–12 | 27,450 | |
^{†}Homecoming
