= 1965 Navy Midshipmen football team =

American college football season

1965 Navy Midshipmen football
- Conference: Independent
- Record: 4–4–2
- Head coach: Bill Elias (1st season)
- Captain: Bob Wittenberg
- Home stadium: Navy–Marine Corps Memorial Stadium

1965 NCAA University Division independents football records
	Conf.			Overall
Team	W	L	T	W		L		T
New Mexico State		–		8	–	2	–	0
Utah State		–		8	–	2	–	0
Xavier		–		8	–	2	–	0
Texas Western		–		8	–	3	–	0
No. 9 Notre Dame		–		7	–	2	–	1
Southern Miss		–		7	–	2	–	0
Syracuse		–		7	–	3	–	0
Virginia Tech		–		7	–	3	–	0
Georgia Tech		–		7	–	3	–	1
Boston College		–		6	–	4	–	0
West Texas State		–		6	–	4	–	0
Boston University		–		5	–	3	–	1
Buffalo		–		5	–	3	–	2
Miami (FL)		–		5	–	4	–	1
Penn State		–		5	–	5	–	0
Memphis State		–		5	–	5	–	0
San Jose State		–		5	–	5	–	0
Navy		–		4	–	4	–	2
Colgate		–		4	–	5	–	1
Florida State		–		4	–	5	–	1
Army		–		4	–	5	–	1
Houston		–		4	–	5	–	1
Colorado State		–		4	–	6	–	0
Air Force		–		3	–	6	–	1
Pittsburgh		–		3	–	7	–	0
Dayton		–		3	–	7	–	0
Holy Cross		–		2	–	7	–	1
Villanova		–		1	–	8	–	0
Rankings from AP Poll

The 1965 Navy Midshipmen football team represented the United States Naval Academy (USNA) as an independent during the 1965 NCAA University Division football season. The team was led by first-year head coach Bill Elias.

== Schedule ==
Date	Time	Opponent	Site	Result	Attendance	Source
September 18		Syracuse^{†}	Navy–Marine Corps Memorial Stadium; Annapolis, MD	L 6–14	20,367	
September 25		at Stanford	Stanford Stadium; Stanford, CA	T 7–7	52,000	
October 2		at Oklahoma	Oklahoma Memorial Stadium; Norman, OK	W 10–0	57,000	
October 9		William & Mary^{†}	Navy–Marine Corps Memorial Stadium; Annapolis, MD	W 42–14	21,375	
October 16		vs. Pittsburgh	District of Columbia Stadium; Washington, DC	W 12–0	24,183	
October 23		at Georgia Tech	Grant Field; Atlanta, GA	L 16–37	49,793	
October 30	2:30 p.m.	at No. 4 Notre Dame	Notre Dame Stadium; Notre Dame, IN (rivalry)	L 3–29	59,206	
November 6		Maryland	Navy–Marine Corps Memorial Stadium; Annapolis, MD (rivalry)	W 19–7	28,135	
November 13		at Penn State	Beaver Stadium; University Park, PA	L 6–14	47,100	
November 27		vs. Army	Philadelphia Municipal Stadium; Philadelphia, PA (Army–Navy Game)	T 7–7	102,000	
^{†}Homecoming; Rankings from AP Poll released prior to the game; All times are in Eastern time; Source:

== Roster ==
1965 Navy Midshipmen football team roster
Players			Coaches
Offense: Pos. / # / Name / Class; QB / / John Cartwright / So	Defense: Pos. / # / Name / Class	Special teams: Pos. / # / Name / Class	Head coach: Bill Elias; Coordinators/assistant coaches Legend: (C) Team captain; (S) Suspended; (I) Ineligible; Injured; Redshirt
