= 1965 Southern Miss Southerners football team =

American college football season

1965 Southern Miss Southerners football
- Conference: Independent
- Record: 7–2
- Head coach: Thad Vann (17th season)
- Home stadium: Faulkner Field

1965 NCAA University Division independents football records
	Conf.			Overall
Team	W	L	T	W		L		T
New Mexico State		–		8	–	2	–	0
Utah State		–		8	–	2	–	0
Xavier		–		8	–	2	–	0
Texas Western		–		8	–	3	–	0
No. 9 Notre Dame		–		7	–	2	–	1
Southern Miss		–		7	–	2	–	0
Syracuse		–		7	–	3	–	0
Virginia Tech		–		7	–	3	–	0
Georgia Tech		–		7	–	3	–	1
Boston College		–		6	–	4	–	0
West Texas State		–		6	–	4	–	0
Boston University		–		5	–	3	–	1
Buffalo		–		5	–	3	–	2
Miami (FL)		–		5	–	4	–	1
Penn State		–		5	–	5	–	0
Memphis State		–		5	–	5	–	0
San Jose State		–		5	–	5	–	0
Navy		–		4	–	4	–	2
Colgate		–		4	–	5	–	1
Florida State		–		4	–	5	–	1
Army		–		4	–	5	–	1
Houston		–		4	–	5	–	1
Colorado State		–		4	–	6	–	0
Air Force		–		3	–	6	–	1
Pittsburgh		–		3	–	7	–	0
Dayton		–		3	–	7	–	0
Holy Cross		–		2	–	7	–	1
Villanova		–		1	–	8	–	0
Rankings from AP Poll

The 1965 Southern Miss Southerners football team was an American football team that represented the University of Southern Mississippi as an independent during the 1965 NCAA University Division football season. In their seventeenth year under head coach Thad Vann, the team compiled a 7–2 record.

== Schedule ==
Date	Opponent	Site	Result	Attendance	Source
September 18	Southeastern Louisiana	Faulkner Field; Hattiesburg, MS	W 15–0	11,000	
September 25	Memphis State	Mississippi Veterans Memorial Stadium; Jackson, MS (rivalry)	W 21–16	22,500	
October 2	Richmond	Faulkner Field; Hattiesburg, MS	W 28–7	10,000	
October 9	at No. 9 Mississippi State	Scott Field; Starkville, MS	L 9–27	25,000	
October 16	VMI^{†}	Faulkner Field; Hattiesburg, MS	W 3–0	13,000	
October 23	at Auburn	Cliff Hare Stadium; Auburn, AL	W 3–0	25,000	
October 30	at William & Mary	Foreman Field; Norfolk, VA (Oyster Bowl)	L 0–3	24,000	
November 6	at Chattanooga	Chamberlain Field; Chattanooga, TN	W 17–0	6,400	
November 13	at Louisiana Tech	Tech Stadium; Ruston, LA (rivalry)	W 31–7	7,500	
^{†}Homecoming; Rankings from AP Poll released prior to the game
