= 1965 Colgate Red Raiders football team =

American college football season

1965 Colgate Red Raiders football
- Conference: Independent
- Record: 6–3–1
- Head coach: Hal Lahar (9th season)
- Captain: John Paske
- Home stadium: Colgate Athletic Field

1965 NCAA University Division independents football records
	Conf.			Overall
Team	W	L	T	W		L		T
New Mexico State		–		8	–	2	–	0
Utah State		–		8	–	2	–	0
Xavier		–		8	–	2	–	0
Texas Western		–		8	–	3	–	0
No. 9 Notre Dame		–		7	–	2	–	1
Southern Miss		–		7	–	2	–	0
Syracuse		–		7	–	3	–	0
Virginia Tech		–		7	–	3	–	0
Georgia Tech		–		7	–	3	–	1
Boston College		–		6	–	4	–	0
West Texas State		–		6	–	4	–	0
Boston University		–		5	–	3	–	1
Buffalo		–		5	–	3	–	2
Miami (FL)		–		5	–	4	–	1
Penn State		–		5	–	5	–	0
Memphis State		–		5	–	5	–	0
San Jose State		–		5	–	5	–	0
Navy		–		4	–	4	–	2
Colgate		–		4	–	5	–	1
Florida State		–		4	–	5	–	1
Army		–		4	–	5	–	1
Houston		–		4	–	5	–	1
Colorado State		–		4	–	6	–	0
Air Force		–		3	–	6	–	1
Pittsburgh		–		3	–	7	–	0
Dayton		–		3	–	7	–	0
Holy Cross		–		2	–	7	–	1
Villanova		–		1	–	8	–	0
Rankings from AP Poll

The 1965 Colgate Red Raiders football team was an American football team that represented Colgate University as an independent during the 1965 NCAA University Division football season. Head coach Hal Lahar returned for the fourth consecutive year, and the ninth overall. His 1965 team compiled a 6–3–1 record. John Paske was the team captain.

The team played its home games at Colgate Athletic Field in Hamilton, New York.

== Schedule ==
Date	Opponent	Site	Result	Attendance	Source
September 18	Lafayette	Colgate Athletic Field; Hamilton, NY	W 40–0	5,800	
September 25	at Cornell	Schoellkopf Field; Ithaca, NY (rivalry)	T 0–0	19,000	
October 2	at Yale	Yale Bowl; New Haven, CT	W 7–0	26,676	
October 9	Holy Cross	Colgate Athletic Field; Hamilton, NY	W 7–3	7,500	
October 16	at Princeton	Palmer Stadium; Princeton, NJ	L 0–27	28,000	
October 23	at Brown	Brown Stadium; Providence, RI	L 0–6	9,100	
October 30	at Army	Michie Stadium; West Point, NY	W 29–28	30,800	
November 6	Bucknell	Colgate Athletic Field; Hamilton, NY	W 21–7	6,000	
November 13	at Buffalo	Rotary Field; Buffalo, NY	L 0–28	8,268	
November 20	at Rutgers	Rutgers Stadium; Piscataway, NJ	W 24–10	13,300	

== Leading players ==
Statistical leaders for the 1965 Red Raiders included:

- Rushing: Marvin Hubbard, 655 yards and 7 touchdowns on 167 attempts
- Passing: Robert Mark, 320 yards, 27 completions and 1 touchdown on 67 attempts
- Receiving: Paul Port, 164 yards and 2 touchdowns on 14 receptions
- Total offense: Marvin Hubbard, 621 yards (all rushing)
- Scoring: Marvin Hubbard, 48 points from 7 touchdowns, 4 PATs and 1 two-point conversion
- All-purpose yards: Marvin Hubbard, 763 yards (621 rushing, 90 receiving, 52 kickoff returning)
