= 1965 Holy Cross Crusaders football team =

American college football season

1965 Holy Cross Crusaders football
- Conference: Independent
- Record: 2–7–1
- Head coach: Mel Massucco (1st season)
- Captains: Joseph T. Lilly; Earl Kirmser
- Home stadium: Fitton Field

1965 NCAA University Division independents football records
	Conf.			Overall
Team	W	L	T	W		L		T
New Mexico State		–		8	–	2	–	0
Utah State		–		8	–	2	–	0
Xavier		–		8	–	2	–	0
Texas Western		–		8	–	3	–	0
No. 9 Notre Dame		–		7	–	2	–	1
Southern Miss		–		7	–	2	–	0
Syracuse		–		7	–	3	–	0
Virginia Tech		–		7	–	3	–	0
Georgia Tech		–		7	–	3	–	1
Boston College		–		6	–	4	–	0
West Texas State		–		6	–	4	–	0
Boston University		–		5	–	3	–	1
Buffalo		–		5	–	3	–	2
Miami (FL)		–		5	–	4	–	1
Penn State		–		5	–	5	–	0
Memphis State		–		5	–	5	–	0
San Jose State		–		5	–	5	–	0
Navy		–		4	–	4	–	2
Colgate		–		4	–	5	–	1
Florida State		–		4	–	5	–	1
Army		–		4	–	5	–	1
Houston		–		4	–	5	–	1
Colorado State		–		4	–	6	–	0
Air Force		–		3	–	6	–	1
Pittsburgh		–		3	–	7	–	0
Dayton		–		3	–	7	–	0
Holy Cross		–		2	–	7	–	1
Villanova		–		1	–	8	–	0
Rankings from AP Poll

The 1965 Holy Cross Crusaders football team was an American football team that represented the College of the Holy Cross as an independent during the 1965 NCAA University Division football season. First-year head coach Mel Massucco led the team to a record of 2–7–1.

All home games were played at Fitton Field on the Holy Cross campus in Worcester, Massachusetts.

== Schedule ==
Date	Opponent	Site	Result	Attendance	Source
September 25	at Harvard	Harvard Stadium; Boston, MA	L 7–17	20,000	
October 2	Dartmouth^{†}	Fitton Field; Worcester, MA	L 6–27	20,000	
October 9	at Colgate	Colgate Athletic Field; Hamilton, NY	L 3–7	7,500	
October 16	Boston University	Fitton Field; Worcester, MA	T 7–7	11,000–12,000	
October 23	at Syracuse	Archbold Stadium; Syracuse, NY	L 6–32	15,000	
October 30	Buffalo^	Fitton Field; Worcester, MA	W 20–8	7,500	
November 6	at UMass	Alumni Stadium; Hadley, MA	L 0–27	17,400	
November 13	at Rutgers	Rutgers Stadium; Piscataway, NJ	L 0–14	9,000	
November 20	at Connecticut	Memorial Stadium; Storrs, CT	W 22–0	1,164	
November 27	Boston College	Fitton Field; Worcester, MA (rivalry)	L 0–35	23,000	
^{†}Homecoming; ^ Family Weekend

== Statistical leaders ==
Statistical leaders for the 1965 Crusaders included:

- Rushing: Earl Kirmser, 303 yards and 2 touchdowns on 93 attempts
- Passing: Tom Tyler, 357 yards, 29 completions and 1 touchdown on 70 attempts
- Receiving: Pete Kimener, 221 yards on 21 receptions
- Scoring: Mike Kaminski, 15 points from 6 PATs and 3 field goals
- Total offense: Tom Tyler, 304 yards (357 passing, minus-53 rushing)
- All-purpose yards: Brian Flatley, 542 yards (314 returning, 128 receiving, 100 rushing)
