= 1965 Virginia Tech Gobblers football team =

American college football season

1965 Virginia Tech Gobblers football
- Conference: Independent
- Record: 7–3
- Head coach: Jerry Claiborne (5th season)
- Home stadium: Lane Stadium

1965 NCAA University Division independents football records
	Conf.			Overall
Team	W	L	T	W		L		T
New Mexico State		–		8	–	2	–	0
Utah State		–		8	–	2	–	0
Xavier		–		8	–	2	–	0
Texas Western		–		8	–	3	–	0
No. 9 Notre Dame		–		7	–	2	–	1
Southern Miss		–		7	–	2	–	0
Syracuse		–		7	–	3	–	0
Virginia Tech		–		7	–	3	–	0
Georgia Tech		–		7	–	3	–	1
Boston College		–		6	–	4	–	0
West Texas State		–		6	–	4	–	0
Boston University		–		5	–	3	–	1
Buffalo		–		5	–	3	–	2
Miami (FL)		–		5	–	4	–	1
Penn State		–		5	–	5	–	0
Memphis State		–		5	–	5	–	0
San Jose State		–		5	–	5	–	0
Navy		–		4	–	4	–	2
Colgate		–		4	–	5	–	1
Florida State		–		4	–	5	–	1
Army		–		4	–	5	–	1
Houston		–		4	–	5	–	1
Colorado State		–		4	–	6	–	0
Air Force		–		3	–	6	–	1
Pittsburgh		–		3	–	7	–	0
Dayton		–		3	–	7	–	0
Holy Cross		–		2	–	7	–	1
Villanova		–		1	–	8	–	0
Rankings from AP Poll

The 1965 Virginia Tech Gobblers football team represented the Virginia Polytechnic Institute or VPI (now known as Virginia Polytechnic Institute and State University or Virginia Tech) as an independent during the 1965 NCAA University Division football season. Led by fifth-year head coach Jerry Claiborne the Gobblers compiled an overall record of 7–3. VPI played home games at Lane Stadium in Blacksburg, Virginia.

== Schedule ==
Date	Time	Opponent	Site	Result	Attendance	Source
September 18		vs. Wake Forest	Victory Stadium; Roanoke, VA (Harvest Bowl)	W 12–3	20,000	
September 25	8:15 p.m.	at Richmond	City Stadium; Richmond, VA	W 25–7	11,000	
October 2		William & Mary	Lane Stadium; Blacksburg, VA	W 9–7	15,000	
October 9		at George Washington	District of Columbia Stadium; Washington DC	W 17–12	12,500	
October 16		at Vanderbilt	Dudley Field; Nashville, TN	L 10–21	14,338	
October 23		Virginia^{†}	Lane Stadium; Blacksburg, VA (rivalry)	W 22–14	30,100	
October 30		at Florida State	Doak Campbell Stadium; Tallahassee, FL	L 6–7	22,536	
November 6		at West Virginia	Mountaineer Field; Morgantown, WV (rivalry)	L 22–31	23,000	
November 13		Villanova	Lane Stadium; Blacksburg, VA	W 21–19	15,000	
November 25		vs. VMI	Victory Stadium; Roanoke, VA (rivalry)	W 44–13	23,000	
^{†}Homecoming; Source:

== Roster ==
The following players were members of the 1965 football team according to the roster published in the 1966 edition of The Bugle, the Virginia Tech yearbook.

VPI 1965 roster
Art Aguilar; Ken Barefoot; Jay Barfield; Judson Bigelow; Andy Bowling; Donnie Bruce; Eddie Bulheller; Paul Frederick Cobb; Clarence Culpepper; George Dallas; Scott Dawson; Damon William Dedo; Bill Edwards; Jack Evan; David Lowell Farmer; Rusty Fife; Gene Fisher; George Foussekis	Tommy Francisco; Sal Garcia; Bill Gordon; Leo Griffin; Bob Griffith; Tommy Groom; Les Hanly; Jeff Haynes; Basil G. Jennings; Erick Johnson; Bill Kegley; Jackie Kennedy; Ronnie Lindon; Dickie Longerbeam; Frank Loria; Ronald Lee McGuigan; Claude Earl Messamore, Jr.; Milton E. Miller	Dan Mooney; Bobby Owens; John Raible; Wayne Rash; James John Reba; Jim Richards; Robert Rupp; Fred Michael Saunders; Dennis Michael Semones; John Sheehy; John George Shipley; Bill Skinner; Tommy Stafford; Tom Swords; Don Thacker; Jonathan Titley Utin; Sands Woody; Peter Wrenn
