= 1965 Utah State Aggies football team =

American college football season

1965 Utah State Aggies football
- Conference: Independent
- Record: 8–2
- Head coach: Tony Knap (3rd season)
- Home stadium: Romney Stadium

1965 NCAA University Division independents football records
	Conf.			Overall
Team	W	L	T	W		L		T
New Mexico State		–		8	–	2	–	0
Utah State		–		8	–	2	–	0
Xavier		–		8	–	2	–	0
Texas Western		–		8	–	3	–	0
No. 9 Notre Dame		–		7	–	2	–	1
Southern Miss		–		7	–	2	–	0
Syracuse		–		7	–	3	–	0
Virginia Tech		–		7	–	3	–	0
Georgia Tech		–		7	–	3	–	1
Boston College		–		6	–	4	–	0
West Texas State		–		6	–	4	–	0
Boston University		–		5	–	3	–	1
Buffalo		–		5	–	3	–	2
Miami (FL)		–		5	–	4	–	1
Penn State		–		5	–	5	–	0
Memphis State		–		5	–	5	–	0
San Jose State		–		5	–	5	–	0
Navy		–		4	–	4	–	2
Colgate		–		4	–	5	–	1
Florida State		–		4	–	5	–	1
Army		–		4	–	5	–	1
Houston		–		4	–	5	–	1
Colorado State		–		4	–	6	–	0
Air Force		–		3	–	6	–	1
Pittsburgh		–		3	–	7	–	0
Dayton		–		3	–	7	–	0
Holy Cross		–		2	–	7	–	1
Villanova		–		1	–	8	–	0
Rankings from AP Poll

The 1965 Utah State Aggies football team was an American football team that represented Utah State University as an independent during the 1965 NCAA University Division football season. In their third season under head coach Tony Knap, the Aggies compiled an 8–2 record and outscored all opponents by a total of 271 to 136.

The team's statistical leaders included Ron Edwards with 1,095 passing yards, Roy Shivers with 1,138 rushing yards and 96 points scored, and Dave Clark with 579 receiving yards.

== Schedule ==
Date	Opponent	Site	Result	Attendance	Source
September 11	Hawaii	Romney Stadium; Logan, UT	W 31–12	7,582	
September 25	at Arizona State	Sun Devil Stadium; Tempe, AZ	W 13–0	29,112	
October 2	at San Jose State	Spartan Stadium; San Jose, CA	W 35–8	16,000	
October 9	Idaho	Romney Stadium; Logan, UT	W 30–19	13,732	
October 16	Montana	Romney Stadium; Logan, UT	W 54–21	11,853	
October 23	at Colorado State	Colorado Field; Fort Collins, CO	W 41–20	14,400	
October 30	BYU	Romney Stadium; Logan, UT (rivalry)	W 34–21	15,596	
November 6	at Memphis State	Liberty Bowl Memorial Stadium; Memphis, TN	L 0–7	23,876	
November 13	at Wichita State	Veterans Field; Wichita, KS	L 19–21	7,266	
November 20	at Utah	Ute Stadium; Salt Lake City, UT (rivalry)	W 14–7	20,357	
