= 1966 Sugar Bowl =

American college football game

- 32nd Sugar Bowl
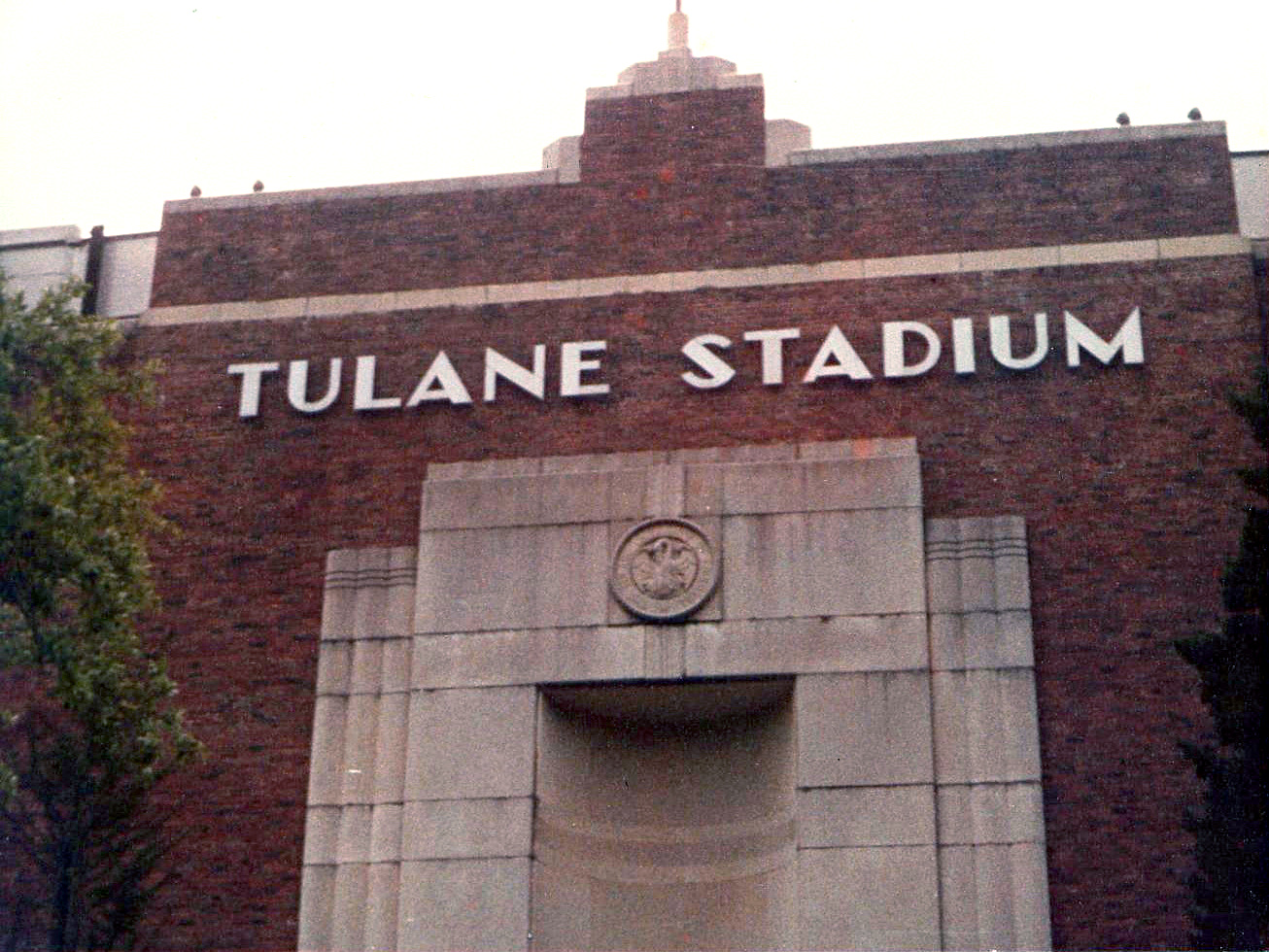
- Tulane Stadium in New Orleans, Louisiana, hosted the Sugar Bowl.
Missouri Tigers	Florida Gators
(7–2–1)	(7–3)
Big 8	SEC
20	18
Head coach: Dan Devine	Head coach: Ray Graves
AP / Coaches; 6 / 6	AP / Coaches; NR / 12
	1	2	3	4	Total
Missouri	0	17	3	0	20
Florida	0	0	0	18	18
- Date: January 1, 1966
- Season: 1965
- Stadium: Tulane Stadium
- Location: New Orleans, Louisiana
- MVP: Steve Spurrier (Florida QB)
- Favorite: Missouri by 2½ points
- Referee: Earl Jansen (Big 8; split crew: Big Eight, SEC)
- Attendance: 67,421

United States TV coverage
- Network: NBC
- Announcers: Jim Simpson, Bud Wilkinson

The 1966 Sugar Bowl was the 32nd edition of the college football bowl game, played at Tulane Stadium in New Orleans, Louisiana, on Saturday, January 1. As a part of the 1965–66 bowl game season, it matched the sixth-ranked Missouri Tigers of the Big Eight Conference and the unranked Florida Gators of the Southeastern Conference (SEC). Missouri was slightly favored and won 20–18.

== Teams ==
=== Missouri ===
The Tigers entered the game with a 7–2–1 record; but they lost by two points to undefeated #5 Nebraska in the Big Eight.

=== Florida ===
The Gators had three losses during the regular season.

== Game summary ==
The Sugar Bowl was the first game of a major bowl tripleheader (Rose, Orange) on NBC, and kicked off at 1 pm CST.

After a scoreless first quarter, Missouri went on a tear in the second quarter. Charlie Brown scored on a 16-yard touchdown run giving the Tigers a 7–0 lead. Defensive back Johnny Roland came in on offense and threw an 11-yard touchdown pass to Earl Denny as the Tigers extended their lead to 14–0. Bill Bates kicked a 27-yard field goal and Missouri led 17–0 at halftime.

In the third quarter, Bates kicked a 34-yard field goal as Missouri led 20–0 at the end of three. Florida attempted to make a furious comeback in the fourth quarter; quarterback Steve Spurrier threw a 22-yard touchdown pass to halfback Jack Harper as Florida got within 20–6. Spurrier threw another 21-yard touchdown pass to end, Charles Casey, as Florida got within 20–12. Spurrier scored himself from two yards out, as the score became 20–18. Florida failed on three consecutive two-point conversion attempts and had they just kicked the extra points, they may have ended with a win.

Despite playing on the losing team, Spurrier was named the Most Valuable Player for the game.

=== Scoring ===
First quarter

No scoring

Second quarter

- Missouri – Charlie Brown 10-yard run (Bill Bates kick)
- Missouri – Earl Denny 11-yard pass from Johnny Roland (Bates kick)
- Missouri – Bates 37-yard field goal

Third quarter

- Missouri – Bates 34-yard field goal

Fourth quarter

- Florida – Jack Harper 22-yard pass from Steve Spurrier (pass failed)
- Florida – Spurrier 2-yard run (pass failed)
- Florida – Charles Casey 21-yard pass from Spurrier (pass failed)

== Statistics ==
Statistics	Missouri	Florida
First downs	18	18
Rushing	62–257	16–(-2)
Passing	5–14–1	27–46–1
Passing yards	50	352
Total offense	76–307	62–350
Punts–avg.	5–44.0	6–32.5
Fumbles–lost	2–2	1–1
Turnovers	3	2
Penalties–yards	2–30	3–25

== Aftermath ==
This was the sixth major bowl appearance for Missouri, and their second Sugar Bowl (1942). Their only major bowl since was four years later in the Orange Bowl. Missouri honored the 1965 Tigers in the 2015 season, bringing the team to midfield at halftime of their 24–10 win over South Carolina, then coached by Spurrier.

This was Florida's first appearance in a major bowl; their first victory came the following year in the Orange Bowl. The Gators' next Sugar Bowl was in December 1974 and their first win came in January 1994.
