= Tommy O'Boyle =

American football player, coach, scout, and administrator

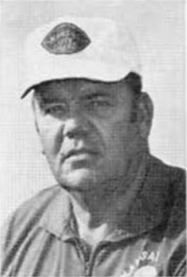
- O'Boyle, c. 1974

Biographical details
- Born: August 21, 1917; Fort Dodge, Iowa. U.S.
- Died: July 19, 2000 (aged 82); Greensboro, North Carolina, U.S.

Playing career
- 1938–1940: Tulane
- Position: Guard

Coaching career (HC unless noted)
- 1941: Tulane (assistant)
- 1946: Tulane (assistant)
- 1947–1948: Southwest Missouri State
- 1949–1950: Kansas State (line)
- 1951–1958: Duke (line)
- 1959–1960: Miami (FL) (line)
- 1961: Tulane (assistant)
- 1962–1965: Tulane
- 1966–1974: Kansas City Chiefs (assistant)

Administrative career (AD unless noted)
- 1947–1948: Southwest Missouri State
- 1975–1984: Kansas City Chiefs (scout)

Head coaching record
- Overall: 22–37–2
- Bowls: 0–1

Accomplishments and honors

Championships
- 1 MIAA (1948)

Awards
- Second-team All-American (1939)

Thomas Joseph O'Boyle (August 21, 1917 – July 19, 2000) was an American football player, coach, scout, and college athletics administrator. He served as the head football coach at Southwest Missouri State College—now known as Missouri State University—from 1947 to 1948 and at Tulane University from 1962 to 1965, compiling a career college football coaching record of 22–37–2. At Southwest Missouri State he was also the school's athletic director. O'Boyle later worked an assistant coach and scout for the Kansas City Chiefs of the American Football League (AFL) and the National Football League (NFL).

== Biography ==
O'Boyle was born on August 21, 1917, in Fort Dodge, Iowa, and was raised in Gary, Indiana. He attended Tulane University and played college football for the Green Wave as a guard from 1938 to 1940. O'Boyle was selected by Chicago Bears in the sixth round of the 1941 NFL draft, but remained at Tulane in 1941 as an assistant coach. He served in the United States Navy during World War II and returned to Tulane as an assistant coach in 1946.

In 1947, O'Boyle was hired as head football coach and athletic director at Southwest Missouri State College. He led the Southwest Missouri State Bears football team for two seasons, compiling a record of 16–4–1 and winning the Missouri Intercollegiate Athletic Association title in 1948. O'Boyle worked as an assistant football coach at Kansas State University from 1949 to 1950, at Duke University from 1951 to 1958, and at the University of Miami from 1959 to 1960, before returning once more to his alma mater, in 1961. After one season as an assistant, he succeeded Andy Pilney as head football coach at Tulane. O'Boyle managed only a 6–33–1 record in four seasons before he quit his post at the end of the 1965 season, a campaign that ended with a 62–0 loss to the rival LSU Tigers (ironically, Pilney's tenure at Tulane ended in the exact same fashion four years earlier).

The following year O'Boyle moved to the ranks of professional football, joining the Kansas City Chiefs of the American Football League (AFL) under head coach Hank Stram, with whom O'Boyle had worked as a fellow assistant at Miami. O'Boyle coached the Chiefs teams that appeared in the First AFL-NFL World Championship Game—later known as Super Bowl I—and won Super Bowl IV. He remained a coach with the team through their merger into the National Football League (NFL) until the end of the 1974 season. Thereafter, he worked as a scout with the Chiefs until his retirement in 1984.

O'Boyle retired to Greensboro, North Carolina, where he died on July 19, 2000.

== Head coaching record ==
Year	Team	Overall	Conference	Standing	Bowl/playoffs
Southwest Missouri State Bears (Missouri Intercollegiate Athletic Association) (1947–1948)
1947	Southwest Missouri State	7–2–1	3–1–1	T–2nd	
1948	Southwest Missouri State	9–2	4–1	T–1st	L Missouri-Kansas
Southwest Missouri State:		16–4–1	7–2–1		
Tulane Green Wave (Southeastern Conference) (1962–1965)
1962	Tulane	0–10	0–7	12th	
1963	Tulane	1–8–1	0–6–1	12th	
1964	Tulane	3–7	1–5	11th	
1965	Tulane	2–8	1–5	T–9th	
Tulane:		6–33–1	2–23–1		
Total:		22–37–2			
National championship Conference title Conference division title or championship game berth
