= 1966 Rose Bowl =

American college football game

- 52nd Rose Bowl Game
UCLA Bruins	Michigan State Spartans
(7–2–1)	(10–0)
AAWU	Big Ten
14	12
Head coach: Tommy Prothro	Head coach: Duffy Daugherty
AP / Coaches; 5 / 5	AP / Coaches; 1 / 1
	1	2	3	4	Total
UCLA	0	14	0	0	14
Michigan State	0	0	0	12	12
- Date: January 1, 1966
- Season: 1965
- Stadium: Rose Bowl
- Location: Pasadena, California
- MVP: Bob Stiles (UCLA DB)
- Favorite: Michigan State by 14 points
- National anthem: UCLA Band
- Referee: Howard Wirtz (Big Ten; split crew: Big Ten, AAWU)
- Halftime show: UCLA Band, Michigan State University Spartan Marching Band
- Attendance: 100,087

United States TV coverage
- Network: NBC
- Announcers: Lindsey Nelson, Terry Brennan
- Nielsen ratings: 28.5

The 1966 Rose Bowl was the 52nd edition of the college football bowl game, played at the Rose Bowl in Pasadena, California, on Saturday, January 1. The fifth-ranked UCLA Bruins of the AAWU (Pac-8) upset the undefeated and top-ranked Michigan State Spartans of the Big Ten Conference, 14–12. UCLA defensive back Bob Stiles, a junior college transfer, was named the Player of the Game.

== Teams ==
The game was a rematch of the season opener in East Lansing that Michigan State won, 13–3. Unknown UCLA quarterback Gary Beban had a long touchdown pass play nullified by a penalty in that game. As it turned out, UCLA gave MSU one of its toughest games of the season in its home opener, a fact that was apparently forgotten when the 14-point odds came out favoring MSU for the Rose Bowl re-match. The two previous meetings also were won by Michigan State in January 1954 and 1956.

=== Michigan State Spartans ===
Michigan State was undefeated and winner of the AFCA National Championship Trophy given to the team ranked #1 in the nation in early December, after the regular season, but before postseason bowl games. Regular season opponents Michigan (-51), Ohio State (-22), and Notre Dame (-12) each had negative yards rushing. Their key victory was a 32–7 win over Ohio State that ultimately decided the Big Ten Conference title as the Spartans finished one game ahead of the Buckeyes.

The Spartans featured future College Football Hall of Fame members split end Gene Washington, defensive end Charles "Bubba" Smith, roverback George "Mickey" Webster, and halfback Clint Jones. Webster is credited with creating the roverback position. In the first round of the 1967 NFL/AFL draft, the first overall pick was Smith by the Baltimore Colts, the second was Jones by the Minnesota Vikings, the fifth was Webster by the Houston Oilers, and the eighth pick was Washington, also by the Minnesota Vikings. They were the first group of four African-American members of the college football hall of fame from the same class. Smith was a defensive end and Webster was a safety on Sports Illustrated's NCAA football all-century team in 1999. In the second round of the 1966 NFL draft, Harold Lucas was selected by the St. Louis Cardinals.

=== UCLA Bruins ===
UCLA lost the season opener at Michigan State 13–3, upset highly regarded Syracuse and Penn State, tied at Missouri 14–14, then won four straight. Going into the rivalry game against USC on November 20, UCLA was ranked seventh, with the conference championship and Rose Bowl were on the line. The sixth-ranked Trojans, led by Heisman Trophy winner Mike Garrett led 16–6 until UCLA got a touchdown on a pass from Gary Beban to Dick Witcher with four minutes to play. After the two-point conversion made it 16–14, UCLA recovered an onside kick. Beban then hit Kurt Altenberg on a fifty-yard bomb and UCLA won, 20–16. Los Angeles Times columnist Jim Murray did not like the Bruins chances.

UCLA then faced Tennessee on December 4 in the new Liberty Bowl in Memphis, the native city of UCLA head coach Tommy Prothro. On the last play of a wild game, defensive back Bob Petrella intercepted a UCLA pass to save a 37–34 Volunteer win. Prothro was uncharacteristically upset. He criticized a pass interference penalty, a phantom holding call on end Byron Nelson that nullified a key UCLA play, claimed that the clock had been wrongly stopped twice on Tennessee's winning drive, and said that a dropped pass was a lateral and a fumble. He stated, "For the first time in my life, I am ashamed to be a Southerner."

The 1965 team was nicknamed the "Gutty little Bruins" as the defensive line was small with John Richardson at 225 pounds (102 kg), Steve Butler at 220 lb (100 kg), and 200-pound (91 kg) defensive tackles Al Claman and Terry Donahue. By comparison, the Spartan defensive line included middle guard Harold Lucas who weighed 286-pound (130 kg) and Bubba Smith who was 6 ft 7 in (2.01 m) and 265 lb (120 kg). Even Michigan State roverback Webster weighed as much as the heaviest UCLA defensive lineman at 225 lb (102 kg).

== Game summary ==
New Year's Day was on Saturday in 1966, and the Pasadena weather was sunny and 65 °F (18 °C). Michigan State was a two-touchdown favorite, and the consensus #1 ranked team, but the undersized Bruins held their own through a scoreless first quarter – even after future Heisman Trophy and Maxwell Award winner Gary Beban ran 27 yards on the Bruins first play from scrimmage. Sophomore Beban surprised Michigan State's defense with a head fake quarterback off-guard run reminiscent of an old single-wing formation tailback off-tackle run play. Beban ran a similar play two years before at Sequoia High School where he was an All America candidate. At the time, he spoke of wanting to playing for Notre Dame but was disappointed that he didn't get a scholarship. UCLA end Byron Nelson stripped the ball from punt returner Don Japinga, co-captain of the Spartans, and center John Erquiaga of UCLA recovered at the Michigan State six-yard line. Beban carried the ball around left end on a quarterback keeper and was stopped at the one by Webster as the quarter ended.

On the first play of the second quarter, Beban took it in from one yard out on a quarterback sneak to give the Bruins a surprising lead over the stunned Spartans. Then Prothro went into his bag of tricks and called for an onside kick. Kicker Kurt Zimmerman executed it perfectly and linebacker Dallas Grider fell on the ball. Halfback Mel Farr ran for 21 yards to the Spartan 22. In preparation for the game, UCLA assistant coach Pepper Rodgers had designed a formation called shadow set, in which wide receivers Altenberg and Witcher lined up one behind the other . From the shadow set, Beban then called the pass play "Michigan spread left post", and threaded a pass between three Spartan defenders to Kurt Altenberg, who made a great catch that put UCLA on the one yard-line. Beban then scored on a short run to make it 14–0. Later in the second quarter, the Spartans drove deep into UCLA territory led by quarterback and co-captain Steve Juday. Their drive was stopped by a fumble during a quarterback scramble. Juday, even though untouched by any UCLA tackler, lost control of the football and UCLA co-captain and defensive end Jim Colletto recovered at the UCLA 19 . Another drive came up empty when just before the half, Dick Kenney, the Spartan barefoot kicker from Hawaii, missed a field goal from the 23-yard line.

UCLA's undersized defense continued to play well in the third quarter, but the larger Spartans were beginning to wear them down and began picking up bigger and bigger chunks of yardage on the ground.

With just over six minutes remaining, Michigan State began a drive from their own 20-yard line. Juday passed to Gene Washington for 42 yards to the UCLA 38. They finally broke through for a touchdown when their large Samoan fullback Bob Apisa took a lateral from sophomore quarterback Jimmy Raye and scored on a 38-yard run. On the point after, Michigan State faked the kick and went for a two-point conversion. Pressured by UCLA defensive end Jerry Klein, Juday's pass failed and UCLA led 14–6. Michigan State got the ball back at the UCLA 49 after Bubba Smith partly blocked a punt by UCLA punter Larry Cox. The Spartans began to march down field in the waning moments, switching on this drive to a two-quarterback system. They alternated Juday and Raye with Daugherty sending in the plays. Three times in this final drive the Spartans went for it on fourth down and picked up the first down. A pass to fullback Eddie Cotton brought the ball to the one-yard line. With thirty-one seconds to play, Juday scored on a quarterback sneak. Trailing 14–12, Daughterty had the Spartans line up on the left hash mark for a two-point conversion attempt. On a play called "option pitch", Raye tossed the football to the sophomore Apisa who ran to the right, and as he turned the corner, it appeared he would fall into the end zone to tie the game. (This would not have resulted in overtime; tie games until the 1996 season) But Apisa was forced by Colletto to run parallel to the goal line. Then Apisa was slowed down by Grider. Finally, Stiles ran full speed and threw himself into Apisa. Although Apisa knocked Stiles unconscious, Stiles' sacrifice kept Apisa out of the end zone. The Spartans then tried an onside kick but UCLA recovered.

"We fell victim to the distractions," Juday later said at a 2015 reunion.

== Scoring ==
=== First quarter ===
No scoring

=== Second quarter ===
- UCLA – Gary Beban, 1-yard run. Kurt Zimmerman converts.
- UCLA – Beban, 1-yard run. Zimmerman converts.

=== Third quarter ===
No scoring

=== Fourth quarter ===
- MSU – Bob Apisa, 38-yard run. Steve Juday's pass failed.
- MSU – Juday, 1-yard run. Apisa run failed.

== Statistics ==
Team stats	UCLA	Michigan St.
First downs	10	13
Net Yards Rushing	65	204
Net Yards Passing	147	110
Total Yards	212	314
PC–PA–Int.	8–20–0	8–22–3
Punts–Avg.	11–39.9	5–42.4
Fumbles–Lost	3–2	3–2
Penalties–Yards	9–86	1–14

== Aftermath ==
Until the 1974 season, the final UPI Coaches' poll was taken after the regular season but before the bowl games, so Michigan State retained its top ranking in the UPI. The AP took its first-ever post-bowl vote this season. Earlier in the day, second-ranked Arkansas was upset by LSU in the Cotton Bowl. In the final major bowl that night, Alabama, ranked fourth with a record of 8–1–1 and led by quarterback Steve Sloan, handed undefeated and third-ranked Nebraska a 39–28 loss in the Orange Bowl. The Crimson Tide was voted first in the AP poll with Michigan State falling to second; UCLA ended up ranked fourth in AP, fifth in UPI.

In a 1995 vote of the greatest moments in Los Angeles sports history, Bob Stiles' stop of Bob Apisa on the goal line ranked #26. The defeat of USC in the rivalry game to get to the Rose Bowl ranked #35.

It was Prothro's second straight Rose Bowl, but also his last, as rival USC went to the next four. In 1966, the Trojans were voted in ahead of the Bruins despite UCLA's 14–7 win over USC. In 1967, a spectacular run by O. J. Simpson gave USC the bid and the national championship. In the 1969 game, a battle of undefeated teams, USC again prevailed, 14–12.

Kurt Altenberg died in 2005. The 1965 Bruins were honored as co-captains in 2015 on October 31 (against Cal), as part of the 50th anniversary celebration.

== Game facts ==
- Future UCLA head coach Terry Donahue was a 195-pound (88 kg) defensive lineman for UCLA. He was an assistant coach for the Bruins' next Rose Bowl appearance, ten years later in January 1976.
- Dallas Grider, who recovered the 2nd quarter onside kick that led to UCLA's second touchdown in the Rose Bowl, also recovered the onside kick in the UCLA–USC game that led to the Bruins' winning touchdown.
- Tommy Prothro became the first coach to take two different schools to the Rose Bowl, and he did it in successive seasons. Prothro guided Oregon State to Pasadena the previous year. It was also Prothro's last Rose Bowl appearance. The AAWU conference voted 7–3 in favor of USC (a team 9–1 UCLA had beaten 14–7) over the Bruins for the berth in the January 1967 game.
- Prothro was a quarterback for Duke University in the 1942 Rose Bowl.
- This was UCLA's first Rose Bowl win after five losses. It was Michigan State's first loss after two wins, both over UCLA.
- This game began a streak of West Coast dominance in the Rose Bowl as Pac-8/Pac-10 teams would win all but four of the next 22 Rose Bowls, often as the underdog.
- Both teams wore their home jerseys, Michigan State in green and UCLA in powder blue.

== Bibliography ==
- 20 Years Ago Today, It Was the Mouse That Roared, Not the Lion : UCLA Pulled Off Perhaps the Biggest Upset in Rose Bowl History, Beating Michigan St. - Page 3 - latimes*
- A night at the bar with Michigan State's 1965 football legends
- CHFS Famous Upsets (PDF Copy available at Archived 2016-09-11 at the Wayback Machine)
- College Football's Most Memorable Games, 2d ed.
- Football's Bowl Week. Sports Illustrated, January 10, 1966, Volume 24, Issue 2
- Gary Beban Helped UCLA Make History 50 Years Ago
- "Gutty Little Bruins" Rise Up
- Michigan State battles UCLA In Rose Bowl Today
- Michigan State Football: They are Spartans
- Michigan State Welcomes 1965-66 Teams Back to Campus for 50-Year Reunion - Michigan State Official Athletic Site Archived 2017-03-26 at the Wayback Machine
- Shanahan, Tom (2014). Raye of Light: Jimmy Raye, Duffy Daugherty, the Integration of College Football, and the 1965-66 Michigan State Spartans. August Publications. ISBN 978-1938532191.
- Roots '66
- ROSE BOWL 1966 - Stock Footage
- Rose Bowl Game Media Guide Available Online - Michigan State Official Athletic Site Archived 2017-01-08 at the Wayback Machine
- Rose Bowl History 1966
- Sports Illustrated Team of the Century
- They may have been gutty, but UCLA's 1966 Rose Bowl team was also gritty
- UCLA Football Media Guide (PDF Copy available at www.uclabruins.com)
- UCLA Shocks Michigan State 14-12
- USA Today College Football Encyclopedia

== See also ==
- List of college football post-season games that were rematches of regular season games
- 1967 UCLA vs. USC football game
