= Johnny Roland =

American football player and coach (born 1943)

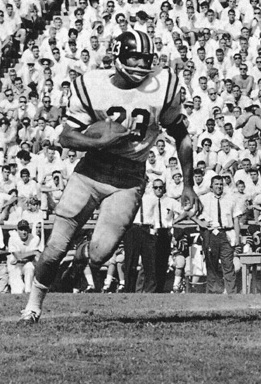
- Roland with the Missouri Tigers in 1962

No. 23
- Position: Running back

Personal information
- Born: May 21, 1943 (age 83); Corpus Christi, Texas, U.S.
- Listed height: 6 ft 2 in (1.88 m)
- Listed weight: 220 lb (100 kg)

Career information
- High school: Roy Miller (Corpus Christi)
- College: Missouri (1962, 1964–1965)
- NFL draft: 1965: 4th round, 54th overall pick
- AFL draft: 1965: red shirt 1st round, 4th overall pick

Career history

Playing
- St. Louis Cardinals (1966–1972); New York Giants (1973)

Coaching
- Green Bay Packers (1974) Assistant coach; Notre Dame (1975) Assistant coach; Philadelphia Eagles (1976–1978) Running backs coach; Chicago Bears (1983–1992) Running backs coach; New York Jets (1993–1994) Running backs coach; St. Louis Rams (1995–1996) Running backs coach; Arizona Cardinals (1997–2003) Running backs coach; Green Bay Packers (2004) Running backs coach; New Orleans Saints (2005) Assistant coach

Awards and highlights
- As a player: NFL Rookie of the Year (1966); Second-team All-Pro (1967); 2× Pro Bowl (1966, 1967); Consensus All-American (1965); Third-team All-American (1962); 2× First-team All-Big Eight (1962, 1965); Second-team All-Big Eight (1964); Missouri Tigers No. 23 retired; As a coach: Super Bowl champion (XX)

Career NFL statistics
- Rushing yards: 3,750
- Rushing average: 3.7
- Rushing touchdowns: 28
- Receptions: 153
- Receiving yards: 1,430
- Receiving touchdowns: 6
- Stats at Pro Football Reference
- College Football Hall of Fame

Johnny Earl Roland (born May 21, 1943) is an American former professional football player and coach in the National Football League (NFL). He played as a running back for the St. Louis Cardinals from 1966 to 1972 and the New York Giants in 1973. Roland played college football for the Missouri Tigers, earning consensus All-American honors as a defensive back in 1965. He was the star running back of the first racially integrated high school team to win a Texas state football championship. After his playing days, he served as an assistant coach with the number of NFL teams and at the University of Notre Dame. Roland was inducted into the College Football Hall of Fame as a player in 1998.

== Early life ==
Roland was born on May 21, 1943, in Corpus Christi, Texas. He played high school football at Roy Miller High School in Corpus Christi, and in 1960 led the team to a 13–1 record and the 4A State Championship, the first racially integrated team in Texas to win a state high school championship.

On the way to the 1960 championship, the Buccaneers won three playoff games to reach the finals, including a win against Port Arthur which was led by future college and NFL Hall of fame coach Jimmy Johnson. They defeated Wichita Falls in the championship game, one of the country's best high school teams (which appeared in four consecutive title games during that period). Roland had 103 yards rushing in the title game, including a 37-yard touchdown run in the 13–6 victory. On the year, Roland rushed for 1,224 yards and scored 90 points.

He was a first team high school All-American.

In 2009, he was inducted into the Texas High School Football Hall of Fame.

== College football ==
Roland played college football at the University of Missouri. In 1962, he rushed for 830 yards, seventh best total in the nation, and scored 78 points, ninth in the nation, leading the Tigers in both categories as well as kickoff returns. This rushing total included 155 yards against Oklahoma State University and 104 against Iowa State University. As a 19-year old sophomore, his college coaches found Roland skilled in all aspects of football, including blocking and tackling and not only running, as well as being alert, smart and quick to learn.

One of his most notable games that season was his first varsity game, where he rushed for 171 yards and three touchdowns. That season, Roland earned his first of three All-Big Eight Conference honors. His teammates included future NFL player Andy Russell.

Thought to have stolen a pair of tires, Roland was suspended by the school for the fall semester. Forced to leave the team and the school during the 1963 season, he worked that year in Kansas City. It was later reported he had nothing to do with the theft, and his coach Dan Devine would not have blamed Roland for leaving Missouri for another school. He was welcomed back to the team in 1964 and was moved to the defensive back position. He led his team to a 6–3–1 record and was again chosen as an All-Big Eight Conference player. He led the team in punt and kickoff returns in 1964 and interceptions in 1965.

In 1965, Roland led the Tigers to an 8–2–1 record and a victory in the 1966 Sugar Bowl over the Florida Gators and Steve Spurrier, 20–18, in which he threw a touchdown pass. That season, he was named the team's captain, was voted a College All-American, and again was on the All-Big Eight team. By being named the captain of the 1965 team, Roland was the first African-American to serve as the captain for any University of Missouri athletic team.

After his senior year, Roland played in the Senior Bowl, Coaches All-America Game and College All Star Game.

Roland had his jersey retired (#23) by Missouri and was inducted to the College Football Hall of Fame in 1998. He was inducted into University of Missouri Hall of Fame in 1990. In 2012, he was selected as a Southeastern Conference Legend.

== Professional career ==
Roland was drafted in the fourth round of the 1965 NFL draft by the St. Louis Cardinals, and by the New York Jets in the 1965 AFL draft. He signed a three year, $400,000, contract with the Cardinals (though reportedly less than the Jets offered). Roland was named UPI NFL Rookie of the Year in 1966. He was selected to play in the Pro Bowl in 1966 and 1967. Roland had 1,476 all-purpose yards in 1966, with six touchdowns. In 1967, he had 876 rushing yards, over 1,000 total yards, and 10 touchdowns when he suffered a season-ending knee injury in the second to last game, that would affect his future career. He would never rush for more than 498 yards in a full season for the remainder of his career.

He played for seven seasons with the Cardinals, and was the franchise's leading rusher when he left the team, and is fourth as of 2024. He then went on to play for one season with the New York Giants in 1973. Roland played in 103 NFL games, during which he rushed for 3,750 yards and 28 touchdowns on 1,015 attempts, caught 153 passes for 1,430 yards and six touchdowns, returned 49 punts for 452 yards with two touchdowns, returned 22 kickoffs for 444 yards, and completed five of 13 passes for 130 yards and one touchdown.

== NFL career statistics ==
Legend
**Bold**	Career high

Year	Team	Games		Rushing					Receiving				
Year	Team	GP	GS	Att	Yds	Avg	Lng	TD	Rec	Yds	Avg	Lng	TD
1966	STL	14	13	192	695	3.6	50	5	21	213	10.1	37	0
1967	STL	13	13	**234**	**876**	3.7	**70**	**10**	20	269	**13.5**	**41**	1
1968	STL	14	13	121	455	3.8	45	2	8	97	12.1	40	0
1969	STL	14	14	138	498	3.6	21	5	12	136	11.3	23	1
1970	STL	14	6	94	392	**4.2**	20	3	17	96	5.6	20	1
1971	STL	13	5	78	278	3.6	16	0	15	108	7.2	15	0
1972	STL	14	9	105	414	3.9	18	2	**38**	**321**	8.4	27	**2**
1973	NYG	7	6	53	142	2.7	10	1	22	190	8.6	30	1
		103	79	1,015	3,750	3.7	70	28	153	1,430	9.3	41	6

== Coaching career ==
=== First stint with Green Bay (1974) ===
Roland's former college coach, Dan Devine, hired Roland to be the Green Bay Packers special assignments coach in 1974. While there, he coordinated some of the first computer programs used by Packers coaches, as well as scouting college talent and coaching.

=== Notre Dame (1975) ===
Roland then followed Devine to the University of Notre Dame, where he was an assistant coach in 1975.

=== Philadelphia Eagles (1976–1978) ===
Roland was the running backs coach for the Philadelphia Eagles from 1976 to 1978 under head coach Dick Vermeil. During his time there, Roland coached Wilbert Montgomery, who helped lead Philadelphia to Super Bowl XV and is the Eagles' second all-time leading rusher behind LeSean McCoy (as of 2024).

=== Chicago Bears (1983–1992) ===
Roland was hired by Chicago Bears head coach Mike Ditka in 1983 to help coach running back Walter Payton, who at the time stood 2,108 yards from Jim Brown's NFL rushing record; breaking the mark in 1984. Roland also coached Payton's successor Neal Anderson, whom Roland coached into the Bears' second all-time leading rusher. He coached in Chicago from 1983 to 1992. During Roland's tenure, the Bears led the league in rushing four times, and finished among the top three in seven of his 11 seasons. From 1984 to 1988, Chicago rushed for 160.9 yards per game, went 62–17 (.785), made the playoffs five straight years and won Super Bowl XX.

=== New York Jets (1993–1994) ===
Roland was the running backs coach for the New York Jets from 1993 to 1994.

=== St. Louis Rams (1995–1996) ===
Roland joined the St. Louis Rams in 1995 and coached running back Jerome Bettis during Bettis' last year with the Rams before playing for the Pittsburgh Steelers.

=== Arizona Cardinals (1997–2003) ===
Roland joined the Arizona Cardinals in 1997. During his final season with the Cardinals in 2003, he coached Emmitt Smith who was traded by the Dallas Cowboys in the offseason. By coaching Smith, Roland became the only coach to work with the two all-time leading NFL rushers (Payton and Smith).

=== Second stint with Green Bay (2004) ===
Roland started his second stint with Green Bay in 2004 as the coach for Ahman Green, who was the National Football Conference's leading rusher in 2003 and second all-time leading rusher in franchise history. Roland coached in Green Bay for only one season before being hired by the New Orleans Saints. He left the Packers because he reportedly had differences with head coach Mike Sherman and a league source reported the Packers had reservations about Roland's work ethic. Roland was reportedly overjoyed to move on to a new position with the New Orleans Saints.

=== New Orleans Saints (2005) ===
Roland joined the New Orleans Saints in 2005 under head coach Jim Haslett. Haslett was fired the following season and replaced with Sean Payton, who chose not to retain Roland.

== Personal life ==
Roland lives in St. Louis, and has two sons, Johnny, Jr. and James, and one daughter, Cynnamon. He owned part of a radio station, KIRL, in St. Louis, until it filed for bankruptcy in 2004. He also owns WRBZ in Wetumpka, Alabama. Roland was inducted into the St. Louis Sports Hall of Fame in 2014. In 2011, he was inducted into the Missouri Sports Hall of Fame.
