= 1965 Auburn Tigers football team =

American college football season

1965 Auburn Tigers football

Liberty Bowl, L 7–13 vs. Ole Miss
- Conference: Southeastern Conference
- Record: 5–5–1 (4–1–1 SEC)
- Head coach: Ralph Jordan (15th season)
- Home stadium: Cliff Hare Stadium; Legion Field

1965 Southeastern Conference football standings
| | Conf. | | | | | Overall |
| Team | W | | L | | T | W | | L | | T |
|---|---|---|---|---|---|---|---|---|---|---|
| No. 1 Alabama $ | 6 | – | 1 | – | 1 | 9 | – | 1 | – | 1 |
| Auburn | 4 | – | 1 | – | 1 | 5 | – | 5 | – | 1 |
| No. 7 Tennessee | 3 | – | 1 | – | 2 | 8 | – | 1 | – | 2 |
| Florida | 4 | – | 2 | – | 0 | 7 | – | 4 | – | 0 |
| Ole Miss | 5 | – | 3 | – | 0 | 7 | – | 4 | – | 0 |
| No. 8 LSU | 3 | – | 3 | – | 0 | 8 | – | 3 | – | 0 |
| Georgia | 3 | – | 3 | – | 0 | 6 | – | 4 | – | 0 |
| Kentucky | 3 | – | 3 | – | 0 | 6 | – | 4 | – | 0 |
| Vanderbilt | 1 | – | 5 | – | 0 | 2 | – | 7 | – | 1 |
| Tulane | 1 | – | 5 | – | 0 | 2 | – | 8 | – | 0 |
| Mississippi State | 1 | – | 5 | – | 0 | 4 | – | 6 | – | 0 |
$ – Conference champion; Tennessee's game against South Carolina and Georgia's game against Clemson counted in the conference standings.; Rankings from AP Poll

The 1965 Auburn Tigers football team represented Auburn University in the 1965 NCAA University Division football season. It was the Tigers' 74th overall and 32nd season as a member of the Southeastern Conference (SEC). The team was led by head coach Ralph "Shug" Jordan, in his 15th year, and played their home games at Cliff Hare Stadium in Auburn and Legion Field in Birmingham, Alabama. They finished with a record of five wins, five losses and one tie (5–5–1 overall, 4–1–1 in the SEC) and with a loss against Ole Miss in the Liberty Bowl.

== Schedule ==
| Date | Opponent | Site | Result | Attendance | Source |
|---|---|---|---|---|---|
| September 18 | Baylor* | Cliff Hare Stadium; Auburn, AL | L 8–14 | 25,000 | |
| September 25 | at Tennessee | Neyland Stadium; Knoxville, TN | T 13–13 | 43,614 | |
| October 2 | No. 6 Kentucky | Cliff Hare Stadium; Auburn, AL | W 23–18 | 35,000 | |
| October 9 | Chattanooga* | Cliff Hare Stadium; Auburn, AL | W 30–7 | 32,160 | |
| October 16 | at Georgia Tech* | Grant Field; Atlanta, GA (rivalry) | L 14–23 | 50,164 | |
| October 23 | Southern Miss* | Cliff Hare Stadium; Auburn, AL | L 0–3 | 25,000 | |
| October 30 | No. 7 Florida^{†} | Cliff Hare Stadium; Auburn, AL (rivalry) | W 28–17 | 46,313 | |
| November 6 | Mississippi State | Legion Field; Birmingham, AL | W 25–18 | 45,000 | |
| November 13 | at Georgia | Sanford Stadium; Athens, GA (rivalry) | W 21–19 | 46,812 | |
| November 27 | vs. No. 5 Alabama | Legion Field; Birmingham, AL (Iron Bowl) | L 3–30 | 66,333 | |
| December 18 | vs. Ole Miss* | Memphis Memorial Stadium; Memphis, TN (Liberty Bowl) | L 7–13 | 38,607 | |
*Non-conference game; ^{†}Homecoming; Rankings from AP Poll released prior to the game
