= 1965 Vanderbilt Commodores football team =

American college football season

1965 Vanderbilt Commodores football
- Conference: Southeastern Conference
- Record: 2–7–1 (1–5 SEC)
- Head coach: John Green (3rd season)
- Home stadium: Dudley Field

1965 Southeastern Conference football standings
	Conf.					Overall
Team	W		L		T	W		L		T
No. 1 Alabama $	6	–	1	–	1	9	–	1	–	1
Auburn	4	–	1	–	1	5	–	5	–	1
No. 7 Tennessee	3	–	1	–	2	8	–	1	–	2
Florida	4	–	2	–	0	7	–	4	–	0
Ole Miss	5	–	3	–	0	7	–	4	–	0
No. 8 LSU	3	–	3	–	0	8	–	3	–	0
Georgia	3	–	3	–	0	6	–	4	–	0
Kentucky	3	–	3	–	0	6	–	4	–	0
Vanderbilt	1	–	5	–	0	2	–	7	–	1
Tulane	1	–	5	–	0	2	–	8	–	0
Mississippi State	1	–	5	–	0	4	–	6	–	0
$ – Conference champion; Tennessee's game against South Carolina and Georgia's game against Clemson counted in the conference standings.; Rankings from AP Poll

The 1965 Vanderbilt Commodores football team represented Vanderbilt University in the 1965 NCAA University Division football season. The Commodores were led by head coach John Green in his third season and finished the season with a record of two wins, seven losses and one tie (2–7–1 overall, 1–5 in the SEC).

== Schedule ==
Date	Opponent	Site	Result	Attendance	Source
September 18	Georgia Tech*	Dudley Field; Nashville, TN (rivalry)	T 10–10	22,275	
September 25	at Georgia	Sanford Stadium; Athens, GA (rivalry)	L 10–24	45,000	
October 2	at Wake Forest*	Bowman Gray Stadium; Winston-Salem, NC	L 0–7	11,000	
October 9	Alabama	Dudley Field; Nashville, TN	L 7–22	29,268	
October 16	Virginia Tech*	Dudley Field; Nashville, TN	W 21–10	14,338	
October 23	at Ole Miss	Hemingway Stadium; Oxford, MS (rivalry)	L 7–24	16,000	
October 30	at Tulane	Tulane Stadium; New Orleans, LA	W 13–0	27,000	
November 6	No. 10 Kentucky	Dudley Field; Nashville, TN (rivalry)	L 0–34	26,663	
November 13	Miami (FL)*	Dudley Field; Nashville, TN	L 14–28	12,996	
November 27	at No. 9 Tennessee	Neyland Stadium; Knoxville, TN (rivalry)	L 3–21	36,248	
*Non-conference game; Rankings from AP Poll released prior to the game
