= 1965 Tulane Green Wave football team =

American college football season

1965 Tulane Green Wave football
- Conference: Southeastern Conference
- Record: 2–8 (1–5 SEC)
- Head coach: Tommy O'Boyle (4th season)
- Home stadium: Tulane Stadium

1965 Southeastern Conference football standings
	Conf.					Overall
Team	W		L		T	W		L		T
No. 1 Alabama $	6	–	1	–	1	9	–	1	–	1
Auburn	4	–	1	–	1	5	–	5	–	1
No. 7 Tennessee	3	–	1	–	2	8	–	1	–	2
Florida	4	–	2	–	0	7	–	4	–	0
Ole Miss	5	–	3	–	0	7	–	4	–	0
No. 8 LSU	3	–	3	–	0	8	–	3	–	0
Georgia	3	–	3	–	0	6	–	4	–	0
Kentucky	3	–	3	–	0	6	–	4	–	0
Vanderbilt	1	–	5	–	0	2	–	7	–	1
Tulane	1	–	5	–	0	2	–	8	–	0
Mississippi State	1	–	5	–	0	4	–	6	–	0
$ – Conference champion; Tennessee's game against South Carolina and Georgia's game against Clemson counted in the conference standings.; Rankings from AP Poll

The 1965 Tulane Green Wave football team was an American football team that represented Tulane University as a member of the Southeastern Conference (SEC) during the 1965 NCAA University Division football season. In its fourth and final year under head coach Tommy O'Boyle, Tulane compiled a 2–8 record (1–5 in conference games, finished in a three-way tie for ninth at the bottom of the SEC standings, and was outscored by a total of 268 to 71.

The team gained an average of 70.4 rushing yards and 124.6 passing yards per game. On defense, it gave up an average of 213.7 rushing yards and 138.5 passing yards per game. Tulane's individual statistical leaders included quarterback Bobby Duhon with 807 passing yards, Carl Crowder with 301 rushing yards, and Jerry Colquette with 466 receiving yards.

1965 was Tulane's final season as a member of the SEC. Tulane president Herbert E. Longenecker announced the school's withdrawal from SEC competition on December 31, 1964, effective June 30, 1966. The Green Wave competed as an independent for the next 30 seasons before joining Conference USA in 1996.

Tulane played its 1965 home games at Tulane Stadium in New Orleans.

== Schedule ==
Date	Opponent	Site	Result	Attendance	Source
September 18	at No. 2 Texas*	Texas Memorial Stadium; Austin, TX (Note: The Green Wave was originally scheduled to open their season at home against Texas September 17, but one week prior to that date, Category 4 Hurricane Betsy wreaked destruction upon New Orleans, bending the light towers at Tulane Stadium, leaving large tree limbs strewn across the campus and the surrounding neighborhood, and knocking out power throughout the metropolitan area. As a result, the game was shifted to Austin and moved back one day.)	L 0–31	40,000	
September 25	at Alabama	Ladd Stadium; Mobile, AL	L 0–27	31,920	
October 2	Miami (FL)*	Tulane Stadium; New Orleans, LA	W 24–16	16,600–17,000	
October 9	Georgia Tech	Tulane Stadium; New Orleans, LA	L 10–13	35,000	
October 16	at Ole Miss	Mississippi Veterans Memorial Stadium; Jackson, MS (rivalry)	L 7–24	20,000	
October 22	Mississippi State	Tulane Stadium; New Orleans, LA	W 17–15	20,000	
October 30	Vanderbilt	Tulane Stadium; New Orleans, LA	L 0–13	27,000	
November 6	Stanford*	Tulane Stadium; New Orleans, LA	L 0–16	15,000	
November 13	at Florida	Florida Field; Gainesville, FL	L 13–51	39,616	
November 20	at LSU	Tiger Stadium; Baton Rouge, LA (Battle for the Rag)	L 0–62	65,000	
*Non-conference game; Rankings from AP Poll released prior to the game
