= 1965 NCAA University Division football rankings =

- Season: 1965
- Bowl season: 1965–66 bowl games
- Preseason No. 1: Nebraska
- End of season champions: Alabama (AP); Michigan State (Coaches)

Two human polls comprised the 1965 NCAA University Division football rankings. Unlike most sports, college football's governing body, the NCAA, does not bestow a national championship, instead that title is bestowed by one or more different polling agencies. There are two main weekly polls that begin in the preseason—the AP Poll and the Coaches Poll.

== Legend ==
	Increase in ranking
	Decrease in ranking
	Not ranked previous week
	National champion
(#–#)	Win–loss record
(Italics)	Number of first place votes
т	Tied with team above or below also with this symbol

== AP Poll ==
For the first time in its history, the final AP Poll was released in January, after the bowl games. This practice would not be repeated again for the next two seasons, but has been the standard since the 1968 season.

The AP Poll ranked only the top ten teams from 1962 through 1967. Entering New Year's Day, the top three teams (Michigan State, Arkansas, Nebraska) were all 10–0, but all three lost.

	Preseason Aug	Week 1 Sep 20	Week 2 Sep 27	Week 3 Oct 4	Week 4 Oct 11	Week 5 Oct 18	Week 6 Oct 25	Week 7 Nov 1	Week 8 Nov 8	Week 9 Nov 15	Week 10 Nov 22	Week 11 Nov 29	Week 12 (Final) Jan 4	
1.	Nebraska (11)	Notre Dame (1–0) (24)	Texas (2–0) (15)	Texas (3–0) (25)	Texas (4–0) (22)	Arkansas (5–0) (28)	Michigan State (6–0) (19)	Michigan State (7–0) (36)	Michigan State (8–0) (32)	Michigan State (9–0) (31)	Michigan State (10–0) (34)	Michigan State (10–0) (35)	Alabama (9–1–1) (37)	1.
2.	Texas (7)	Nebraska (1–0) (16)	Purdue (2–0) (14)	Nebraska (3–0) (10)	Nebraska (4–0) (16)	Michigan State (5–0) (14)	Arkansas (6–0) (23)	Arkansas (7–0) (11)	Arkansas (8–0) (14)	Arkansas (9–0) (15)	Arkansas (10–0) (9)	Arkansas (10–0) (10)	Michigan State (10–1) (18)	2.
3.	Notre Dame (7)	Texas (1–0) (7)	Nebraska (2–0) (13)	Arkansas (3–0) (1)	Arkansas (4–0) (4)	Nebraska (5–0) (8)	Nebraska (6–0) (9)	Nebraska (7–0) (3)	Nebraska (8–0) (4)	Nebraska (9–0) (2)	Nebraska (9–0)	Nebraska (10–0)	Arkansas (10–1) (1)	3.
4.	Michigan (5)	Michigan (1–0) (2)	Arkansas (2–0) (3)	Georgia (3–0) (3)	Michigan State (4–0) (3)	USC (4–0–1)	Notre Dame (4–1)	Notre Dame (5–1)	Notre Dame (6–1) (1)	Notre Dame (7–1)	UCLA (7–1–1)	Alabama (8–1–1) (1)	UCLA (8–2–1) (1)	4.
5.	Alabama (4)	Arkansas (1–0) (4)	LSU (2–0)	Michigan State (3–0)	Georgia (4–0) (2)	Texas (4–1)	LSU (5–1)	Alabama (5–1–1)	Alabama (6–1–1)	Alabama (7–1–1)	Alabama (7–1–1)	UCLA (7–1–1)	Nebraska (10–1)	5.
6.	Arkansas (6)	Purdue (1–0)	Kentucky (2–0) (1)	Purdue (2–0–1) (1)	USC (3–0–1)	Purdue (4–0–1)	Purdue (4–1–1)	USC (4–1–1)	USC (5–1–1)	USC (6–1–1)	Notre Dame (7–2)	Missouri (7–2–1)	Missouri (8–2–1)	6.
7.	USC (4)	LSU (1–0)	Michigan (2–0)	Notre Dame (2–1)	Purdue (3–0–1) (1)	Notre Dame (3–1)	Florida (4–1)	Georgia Tech (5–1–1)	UCLA (5–1–1)	UCLA (6–1–1)	Missouri (7–2–1)	Tennessee (6–1–2)	Tennessee (8–1–2)	7.
8.	LSU	Florida (1–0)	Notre Dame (1–1)	USC (2–0–1)	Notre Dame (3–1)	Florida (4–1)	USC (4–1–1)	UCLA (4–1–1)	Tennessee (4–0–2)	Missouri (6–2–1)	USC (6–2–1)	USC (7–2–1)	LSU (8–3)	8.
9.	Purdue (1)	Syracuse (1–0)	Michigan State (2–0)	Mississippi State (3–0)	Florida (3–1)	LSU (4–1)	Texas (4–2)	Missouri (4–2–1)	Missouri (5–2–1)	Texas Tech (8–1)	Tennessee (5–1–2)	Notre Dame (7–2–1)	Notre Dame (7–2–1)	9.
10.	Ohio State (1)	Kentucky (1–0)	Georgia (2–0)	Florida (2–1)	Mississippi State (4–0)	Georgia (4–1)	Alabama (4–1–1)	Kentucky (5–2)	Kentucky (6–2)	Florida (6–2)	Texas Tech (8–2)	Texas Tech (8–2)	USC (7–2–1)	10.
	Preseason Aug	Week 1 Sep 20	Week 2 Sep 27	Week 3 Oct 4	Week 4 Oct 11	Week 5 Oct 18	Week 6 Oct 25	Week 7 Nov 1	Week 8 Nov 8	Week 9 Nov 15	Week 10 Nov 22	Week 11 Nov 29	Week 12 (Final) Jan 4	
		Dropped: Alabama; Ohio State; USC	Dropped: Florida; Syracuse	Dropped: Kentucky; LSU; Michigan	None	Dropped: Mississippi State	Dropped: Georgia	Dropped: Florida; LSU; Purdue; Texas	Dropped: Georgia Tech	Dropped: Kentucky; Tennessee	Dropped: Florida	None	Dropped: Texas Tech	

== Final Coaches Poll ==
The final UPI Coaches Poll was released prior to the bowl games, in late November.
Michigan State received 28 of the 35 first-place votes; Arkansas received five and Nebraska two.

Ranking	Team	Conference	Bowl
1	Michigan State	Big Ten	Lost Rose, 12–14
2	Arkansas	Southwest	Lost Cotton, 7–14
3	Nebraska	Big Eight	Lost Orange, 28–39
4	Alabama	SEC	Won Orange, 39–28
5	UCLA	AAWU (Pac-8)	Won Rose, 14–12
6	Missouri	Big Eight	Won Sugar, 20–18
7	Tennessee	SEC	Won Bluebonnet, 27–6
8	Notre Dame	Independent	none
9	USC	AAWU (Pac-8)	none
10	Texas Tech	Southwest	Lost Gator, 21–31
11	Ohio State	Big Ten	none
12	Florida	SEC	Lost Sugar, 18–20
13	Purdue	Big Ten	none
14	LSU	SEC	Won Cotton, 14–7
15	Georgia	SEC	none
16	Tulsa	MVC	Lost Bluebonnet, 6–27
17	Mississippi	SEC	Won Liberty, 13–7
18	Kentucky	SEC	none
19	Syracuse	Independent	none
20	Colorado	Big Eight	none

- Notre Dame did not participate in bowl games from 1925 through 1968.
- Prior to the 1975 season, the Big Ten and Pac-8 conferences allowed only one postseason participant each, for the Rose Bowl.
- The Ivy League has prohibited its members from participating in postseason football since the league was officially formed in 1954.

== Litkenhouse ==
1. Michigan State - 114.0
2. Arkansas - 107.2
3. Nebraska - 104.8
4. Notre Dame
5. UCLA - 104.2
6. USC - 104.0
7. Alabama - 104.1
8. Purdue - 101.5
9. Tennessee - 101.1
10. Illinois - 100.1
11. Florida - 99.4
12. Missouri - 98.7
13. Ole Miss - 97.6
16. Ohio State
20. Michigan
