= 1965 Kentucky Wildcats football team =

American college football season

1965 Kentucky Wildcats football
- Conference: Southeastern Conference

Ranking
- Coaches: No. 18
- Record: 6–4 (3–3 SEC)
- Head coach: Charlie Bradshaw (4th season)
- Captains: Sam Ball; Rick Norton
- Home stadium: McLean Stadium

1965 Southeastern Conference football standings
	Conf.					Overall
Team	W		L		T	W		L		T
No. 1 Alabama $	6	–	1	–	1	9	–	1	–	1
Auburn	4	–	1	–	1	5	–	5	–	1
No. 7 Tennessee	3	–	1	–	2	8	–	1	–	2
Florida	4	–	2	–	0	7	–	4	–	0
Ole Miss	5	–	3	–	0	7	–	4	–	0
No. 8 LSU	3	–	3	–	0	8	–	3	–	0
Georgia	3	–	3	–	0	6	–	4	–	0
Kentucky	3	–	3	–	0	6	–	4	–	0
Vanderbilt	1	–	5	–	0	2	–	7	–	1
Tulane	1	–	5	–	0	2	–	8	–	0
Mississippi State	1	–	5	–	0	4	–	6	–	0
$ – Conference champion; Tennessee's game against South Carolina and Georgia's game against Clemson counted in the conference standings.; Rankings from AP Poll

The 1965 Kentucky Wildcats football team represented the University of Kentucky in the Southeastern Conference during the 1965 NCAA University Division football season. The Wildcats scored 202 points while allowing 160 points, finishing 6–4 overall, 3–3 in the SEC.

Rick Norton and Sam Ball were chosen as team captains.

Kentucky opened with a 7–0 win at Missouri. Missouri finished the season ranked #6 in the nation, with a record of 8–2–1. Kentucky entered Week 2 of the season ranked #10 in the country.

The second game was a 16–7 win against Ole Miss. Kentucky advanced to a #6 ranking in the AP poll.

A loss at Auburn (23–18) was followed by a 26–24 win against Florida State. A 31–21 loss at LSU was followed by a 28–10 win over Georgia and a 28–8 victory over West Virginia. Kentucky then was ranked again in the AP poll, at #10.

Next was a 34–0 win over Vanderbilt. Kentucky retained its #10 ranking in the AP poll.

At that point Kentucky was offered a bid to the Gator Bowl but turned it down, hoping for a better bowl invitation. However, star quarterback Rick Norton suffered a broken leg in the next game, which ended up being a 38–21 loss at Houston, and a 19–3 loss to Tennessee left the Wildcats with a 6–4 record and no bowl game.

== Schedule ==
Date	Opponent	Rank	Site	Result	Attendance	Source
September 18	at Missouri*		Memorial Stadium; Columbia, MO	W 7–0	44,550	
September 25	Ole Miss	No. 10	McLean Stadium; Lexington, KY	W 16–7	38,000	
October 2	at Auburn	No. 6	Cliff Hare Stadium; Auburn, AL	L 18–23	35,000	
October 9	Florida State*		McLean Stadium; Lexington, KY	W 26–24	37,500	
October 16	at LSU		Tiger Stadium; Baton Rouge, LA	L 21–31	68,000	
October 23	No. 10 Georgia		McLean Stadium; Lexington, KY	W 28–10	37,300	
October 30	West Virginia*^{†}		McLean Stadium; Lexington, KY	W 28–8	37,500	
November 6	at Vanderbilt	No. 10	Dudley Field; Nashville, TN (rivalry)	W 34–0	26,663	
November 13	at Houston*	No. 10	Houston Astrodome; Houston, TX	L 21–38	37,248	
November 20	Tennessee		McLean Stadium; Lexington, KY (rivalry)	L 3–19	38,000	
*Non-conference game; ^{†}Homecoming; Rankings from AP Poll released prior to the game

== Team players in the 1966 NFL and AFL drafts ==
Player	Position	Round	Pick	NFL club
Rick Norton	Quarterback	1	2	Miami Dolphins
Rodger Bird	Defensive back	1	10	Oakland Raiders
Sam Ball	Tackle	1	15	Baltimore Colts
Sam Ball	Tackle	2	14	New York Jets
Bob Windsor	Tight end	2	26	San Francisco 49ers
Rick Norton	Quarterback	2	29	Cleveland Browns
Rick Kestner	Wide receiver	3	47	Baltimore Colts
Doug Davis	Tackle	5	72	Minnesota Vikings
Rick Kestner	Wide receiver	18	155	Miami Dolphins
