= 1965 Georgia Bulldogs football team =

American college football season

1965 Georgia Bulldogs football
- Conference: Southeastern Conference

Ranking
- Coaches: No. 15
- Record: 6–4 (3–3 SEC)
- Head coach: Vince Dooley (2nd season)
- Defensive coordinator: Erk Russell (2nd season)
- Home stadium: Sanford Stadium

1965 Southeastern Conference football standings
	Conf.					Overall
Team	W		L		T	W		L		T
No. 1 Alabama $	6	–	1	–	1	9	–	1	–	1
Auburn	4	–	1	–	1	5	–	5	–	1
No. 7 Tennessee	3	–	1	–	2	8	–	1	–	2
Florida	4	–	2	–	0	7	–	4	–	0
Ole Miss	5	–	3	–	0	7	–	4	–	0
No. 8 LSU	3	–	3	–	0	8	–	3	–	0
Georgia	3	–	3	–	0	6	–	4	–	0
Kentucky	3	–	3	–	0	6	–	4	–	0
Vanderbilt	1	–	5	–	0	2	–	7	–	1
Tulane	1	–	5	–	0	2	–	8	–	0
Mississippi State	1	–	5	–	0	4	–	6	–	0
$ – Conference champion; Tennessee's game against South Carolina and Georgia's game against Clemson counted in the conference standings.; Rankings from AP Poll

The 1965 Georgia Bulldogs football team represented the University of Georgia as a member of the Southeastern Conference (SEC) during the 1965 NCAA University Division football season. Led by second-year head coach Vince Dooley, the Bulldogs compiled an overall record of 6–4 with a mark of 3–3 in conference play, placing in a three-way tie for sixth in the SEC. Georgia played home games at Sanford Stadium in Athens, Georgia.

== Schedule ==
Date	Opponent	Rank	Site	TV	Result	Attendance	Source
September 18	No. 5 Alabama		Sanford Stadium; Athens, GA (rivalry)	ABC	W 18–17	41,500	
September 25	Vanderbilt		Sanford Stadium; Athens, GA (rivalry)		W 24–10	45,000	
October 2	at No. 7 Michigan*	No. 10	Michigan Stadium; Ann Arbor, MI		W 15–7	59,470	
October 9	Clemson (Note: Georgia's game against Clemson counted in the SEC standings.)^{†}	No. 4	Sanford Stadium; Athens, GA (rivalry)		W 23–9	45,000	
October 16	at Florida State*	No. 5	Doak Campbell Stadium; Tallahassee, FL		L 3–10	40,112	
October 23	at Kentucky	No. 10	McLean Stadium; Lexington, KY		L 10–28	37,300	
October 30	at North Carolina*		Kenan Memorial Stadium; Chapel Hill, NC		W 47–35	43,000	
November 6	vs. Florida		Gator Bowl Stadium; Jacksonville, FL (rivalry)		L 10–14	61,527	
November 13	Auburn		Sanford Stadium; Athens, GA (rivalry)		L 19–21	46,812	
November 27	Georgia Tech*		Grant Field; Atlanta, GA (rivalry)		W 17–7	52,013	
*Non-conference game; ^{†}Homecoming; Rankings from AP Poll released prior to the game

== Roster ==
1965 Georgia Bulldogs football team roster
Players
Coaches
Offense

Pos.	#	Name	Class
QB		Danny Cronic	Fr
QB		Kirby Moore	So
QB		Preston Ridlehuber	Sr

Defense

Pos.	#	Name	Class

Special teams

Pos.	#	Name	Class

Head coach

- Vince Dooley

Coordinators/assistant coaches

- Erk Russell
  (Defensive coordinator)
- Hootie Ingram
  (Defensive backs coach)

Legend

- (C) Team captain
- (S) Suspended
- (I) Ineligible
- Injured
- Redshirt
