= Jack Harper (American football) =

American football player (born 1944)

No. 29
- Position: Running back

Personal information
- Born: October 8, 1944 (age 82); Lakeland, Florida, U.S.
- Listed height: 5 ft 11 in (1.80 m)
- Listed weight: 190 lb (86 kg)

Career information
- High school: Lakeland
- College: Florida
- NFL draft: 1967: undrafted

Career history
- Miami Dolphins (1967–1968)

Career NFL/AFL statistics
- Games played: 14
- Rushing attempts: 41
- Rushing yards: 197
- Receptions: 11
- Receiving yards: 212
- Touchdowns: 4
- Stats at Pro Football Reference

Jack Ridley Harper (born October 8, 1944) is an American former professional football player who was a running back for two seasons in the American Football League (AFL) and National Football League (NFL) during the 1960s. Harper played college football for the Florida Gators, and thereafter, he played for the Miami Dolphins of the AFL and NFL.

== Early life ==
Harper was born in Lakeland, Florida, in 1944. He attended Lakeland High School, and he played for the Lakeland Dreadnaughts high school football team.

== College career ==
Harper accepted an athletic scholarship to attend the University of Florida in Gainesville, Florida, where he played for coach Ray Graves' Gators teams from 1963 to 1965. Memorably, he had an 80-yard punt return for a touchdown versus the SMU Mustangs in 1964, and had 111 receiving yards against the Florida State Seminoles in 1965. Harper led the Gators in kick return yardage for three consecutive seasons, and as a senior halfback in 1965, he became one of quarterback Steve Spurrier's favorite passing targets out of the backfield. He had 1,127 total yards gained in 1965, including 286 rushing, 403 receiving and 438 kick return yards.

== Professional career ==
In July 1966, Harper was one of 83 rookies to show up at the original Miami Dolphins training camp held on St. Petersburg Beach. Harper suffered a slight back injury on the second day of practice, and he was cut on July 9, 1966, before the free agent veterans showed up, as the original group of 83 rookies had to be cut to 49 that day to make room for the incoming veterans. The next year, Harper signed with the AFL expansion franchise Miami Dolphins as an undrafted free agent in 1967, and he played for the Dolphins in fourteen games from 1967 to 1968. He compiled 197 rushing yards and a touchdown on forty-one carries, and 212 receiving yards and three touchdowns on eleven catches in his two AFL seasons.

== See also ==
- History of the Miami Dolphins
- List of American Football League players
- List of Miami Dolphins players
