= Bobby Johns (American football) =

American football player and coach (born 1946)

Biographical details
- Born: May 18, 1946 (age 80); Birmingham, Alabama, U.S.

Playing career
- 1965–1969: Alabama
- Position: Defensive back

Coaching career (HC unless noted)
- 1972: North Alabama (assistant)
- 1976–1977: McAdory HS (AL)
- 1978–1983: Erwin HS (AL)
- 1984: Valdosta State (assistant)
- 1985: Florida State (GA)
- 1986–1992: Chattanooga (DC)
- 1993: Eastern Kentucky (assistant)
- 1994–1995: South Carolina (assistant)
- 1996: West Alabama (DC)
- 1997–2000: West Alabama

Head coaching record
- Overall: 11–31 (college); 52–30 (high school)

Accomplishments and honors

Awards
- Consensus All-American (1967); First-team All-American (1966); 3× First-team All-SEC (1965, 1966, 1967)

Bobby Johns (born May 17, 1946) is an American former football coach and player. He served as an assistant coach in the college ranks for many years as well as head coach for a pair of high schools and at the University of West Alabama from 1997 through 2000. He is also a former college football All-American defensive back who played for coach Bear Bryant at the University of Alabama.

== Early years ==
After graduating from Banks High School in Birmingham, Alabama, Johns enrolled at the University of Alabama. Playing quarterback in high school, during his freshman year he moved to defensive back. For the Crimson Tide, Johns was a member of the 1965 national championship team, was selected All-SEC three times (1965–1967) and All-America twice (1966–1967). He was selected in the 12th Round of the 1968 NFL/AFL draft by the Kansas City Chiefs, but elected to pursue a coaching career instead. As recognition for his career at Alabama, Johns was elected to the Alabama Sports Hall of Fame in 2010.

== Coaching career ==
Early in his career, Johns coach at both McAdory and E.B. Erwin High School where he compiled an overall record of 52 wins and 30 losses (52–30) during his eight-year tenure as a high school head coach. From Erwin, Johns entered the college coaching ranks in 1972 where he coached defensive backs at Florence State University now UNA. Between 1984 and 1996 he coached at Valdosta State, Florida State, Chattanooga, Eastern Kentucky, South Carolina and West Alabama. After serving one season as defensive coordinator at West Alabama, in December 1996 he was promoted to the head coach position after the resignation of Todd Stroud. Prior to entering the 2000 season with the Tigers, Johns announced he would resign from his position effective at the end of the season. For his career at West Alabama, Johns compiled a record of 11 wins and 31 losses (11–31).

== Head coaching record ==
=== College ===
Year	Team	Overall	Conference	Standing	Bowl/playoffs
West Alabama Tigers (Gulf South Conference) (1997–2000)
1997	West Alabama	4–6	1–6	9th	
1998	West Alabama	3–7	2–7	8th	
1999	West Alabama	1–10	1–8	10th	
2000	West Alabama	3–8	2–7	10th	
West Alabama:		11–31	6–28		
Total:		11–31			
National championship Conference title Conference division title or championship game berth
