= 1965 Mississippi State Bulldogs football team =

American college football season

1965 Mississippi State Bulldogs football
- Conference: Southeastern Conference
- Record: 4–6 (1–5 SEC)
- Head coach: Paul E. Davis (4th season)
- Home stadium: Scott Field; Mississippi Veterans Memorial Stadium

1965 Southeastern Conference football standings
	Conf.					Overall
Team	W		L		T	W		L		T
No. 1 Alabama $	6	–	1	–	1	9	–	1	–	1
Auburn	4	–	1	–	1	5	–	5	–	1
No. 7 Tennessee	3	–	1	–	2	8	–	1	–	2
Florida	4	–	2	–	0	7	–	4	–	0
Ole Miss	5	–	3	–	0	7	–	4	–	0
No. 8 LSU	3	–	3	–	0	8	–	3	–	0
Georgia	3	–	3	–	0	6	–	4	–	0
Kentucky	3	–	3	–	0	6	–	4	–	0
Vanderbilt	1	–	5	–	0	2	–	7	–	1
Tulane	1	–	5	–	0	2	–	8	–	0
Mississippi State	1	–	5	–	0	4	–	6	–	0
$ – Conference champion; Tennessee's game against South Carolina and Georgia's game against Clemson counted in the conference standings.; Rankings from AP Poll

The 1965 Mississippi State Bulldogs football team was an American football team that represented Mississippi State University as a member of the Southeastern Conference (SEC) during the 1965 NCAA University Division football season. In their fourth year under head coach Paul E. Davis, the Bulldogs compiled an overall record of 4–6, with a mark of 1–5 in conference play, and finished tied for ninth in the SEC.

== Schedule ==
Date	Opponent	Rank	Site	Result	Attendance	Source
September 18	at Houston*		Astrodome; Houston, TX	W 36–0	37,216	
September 25	at No. 8 Florida		Florida Field; Gainesville, FL	W 18–13	46,000	
October 2	Tampa*		Scott Field; Starkville, MS	W 48–7	17,000	
October 9	Southern Miss*	No. 9	Scott Field; Starkville, MS	W 27–9	25,000	
October 16	at Memphis State*	No. 10	Memphis Memorial Stadium; Memphis, TN	L 13–33	41,431	
October 22	at Tulane		Tulane Stadium; New Orleans, LA	L 15–17	20,000	
October 30	No. 10 Alabama		Mississippi Veterans Memorial Stadium; Jackson, MS (rivalry)	L 7–10	46,000	
November 6	at Auburn		Legion Field; Birmingham, AL	L 18–25	45,000	
November 13	at LSU		Tiger Stadium; Baton Rouge, LA (rivalry)	L 20–37	60,000	
November 27	Ole Miss		Scott Field; Starkville, MS (Egg Bowl)	L 0–21	35,000	
*Non-conference game; Rankings from AP Poll released prior to the game
