= 1966 Orange Bowl =

American college football game

- 32nd Orange Bowl; National Championship Game (Note: Through luck and fortuitous scheduling, a "national championship game" was occasionally able to settle the matter on the field, as described in some contemporaneous reports. Despite the promotional billing, in several instances there were plausible scenarios for a third team to be selected as national champion by the major selectors, depending on outcomes of other games.) (Note: Became AP Poll championship game after No. 1 and 2 teams lost the Rose and Cotton Bowl games earlier in the day.)
- The Miami Orange Bowl in Miami, Florida, hosted the Orange Bowl.
Alabama Crimson Tide	Nebraska Cornhuskers
(8–1–1)	(10–0)
SEC	Big Eight
39	28
Head coach: Bear Bryant	Head coach: Bob Devaney
AP / Coaches; 4 / 4	AP / Coaches; 3 / 3
	1	2	3	4	Total
Alabama	7	17	8	7	39
Nebraska	0	7	6	15	28
- Date: January 1, 1966
- Season: 1965
- Stadium: Orange Bowl
- Location: Miami, Florida
- MVP: Steve Sloan (Alabama QB)
- Favorite: Alabama by 3 points
- Referee: Morris Harrison (SEC; split crew: SEC, Big Eight)
- Attendance: 72,214

United States TV coverage
- Network: NBC
- Announcers: Curt Gowdy, Paul Christman
- Nielsen ratings: 19.1

The 1966 Orange Bowl was the 32nd edition of the college football bowl game, played at the Orange Bowl in Miami, Florida, on Saturday, January 1. The final game of the 1965–66 bowl season, it matched the third-ranked and undefeated Nebraska Cornhuskers of the Big Eight Conference and the #4 Alabama Crimson Tide of the Southeastern Conference (SEC).

This was the second year that the Orange Bowl was played at night on New Year's Day, after the other college football bowl games. Due to losses by both #1 Michigan State in the Rose Bowl and #2 Arkansas in the Cotton Bowl earlier in the day, the game had turned into a de facto national championship game, as the AP would be taking a final post-bowl vote for the first time ever. Slightly favored, Alabama won, 39–28.

== Game summary ==
Alabama scored first on a 32-yard touchdown pass from Steve Sloan to Ray Perkins. In the second quarter, Nebraska's Bob Churchich threw a 33-yard touchdown pass to Tony Jeter to tie the game at seven. Alabama's Les Kelly scored on a four-yard touchdown run as the Crimson Tide regained the lead at 14–7. Sloan and Perkins connected again from eleven yards out, then Alabama recovered the ensuing onside kick; a 19-yard field goal David Ray in the final minute gave the Crimson Tide a commanding 24–7 lead at halftime.

In the third quarter, Churchich threw a 49-yard touchdown pass to Ben Gregory as Nebraska narrowed the deficit to 24–13. Steve Bowman scored from a yard out, and a successful two-point conversion, increased the Tide's lead to 32–13.

On the first play of the fourth quarter, Churchich ran in from a yard to make it 32–20. Alabama answered with a time-consuming drive, with Bowman scoring on a three-yard run, which put the lead back to nineteen points at 39–20 with just over eight minutes remaining. Churchich threw a 14-yard touchdown pass to Jeter with less than three minutes to go for the last score as Alabama won 39–28. Quarterback Sloan was named the game's outstanding player.

=== Scoring ===
First quarter

- Alabama – Ray Perkins 21-yard pass from Steve Sloan (David Ray kick), 9:36

Second quarter

- Nebraska – Tony Jeter 33-yard pass from Bob Churchich (Larry Wachholtz kick), 12:15
- Alabama – Les Kelley 4-yard run (Ray kick), 7:11
- Alabama – Perkins 11-yard pass from Sloan (Ray kick), 1:42
- Alabama – Ray 19-yard field goal, 0:34

Third quarter

- Nebraska – Ben Gregory 49-yard pass from Churchich (pass failed), 9:35
- Alabama – Steve Bowman 1-yard run (Perkins pass from Sloan), 4:29

Fourth quarter

- Nebraska – Churchich 1-yard run (Wachholtz kick), 14:58
- Alabama – Bowman 3-yard run (Ray kick), 8:13
- Nebraska – Jeter 14-yard pass from Churchich (Gregory pass from Churchich), 2:50

== Statistics ==
Statistics	Alabama	Nebraska
First downs	29	17
Rushes–yards	57–222	24–145
Passing yards	296	232
Passes (C–A–I)	20–29–2	12–19–1
Total offense	86–518	43–377
Punts–average	5–31.2	3–41.7
Fumbles–lost	0–0	4–4
Turnovers	2	5
Penalties–yards	8–62	8–86

== Aftermath ==
In the final AP poll, Alabama climbed to first for the national championship, while Nebraska dropped to fifth.

Both Nebraska and Alabama would play for the National Championship again in the 1972 Orange Bowl, where the Cornhuskers exacted revenge over the Tide in a 38-6 blowout win to repeat as national champions.
