= 1965 Alabama Crimson Tide football team =

American college football season

1965 Alabama Crimson Tide football

AP poll national champion FWAA co-national champion SEC champion Orange Bowl champion

Orange Bowl (NCG), W 39–28 vs. Nebraska
- Conference: Southeastern Conference

Ranking
- Coaches: No. 4
- AP: No. 1
- Record: 9–1–1 (6–1–1 SEC)
- Head coach: Bear Bryant (8th season)
- Offensive coordinator: Howard Schnellenberger (5th season)
- Captains: Steve Sloan; Paul Crane
- Home stadium: Denny Stadium; Legion Field; Ladd Stadium

1965 Southeastern Conference football standings
	Conf.					Overall
Team	W		L		T	W		L		T
No. 1 Alabama $	6	–	1	–	1	9	–	1	–	1
Auburn	4	–	1	–	1	5	–	5	–	1
No. 7 Tennessee	3	–	1	–	2	8	–	1	–	2
Florida	4	–	2	–	0	7	–	4	–	0
Ole Miss	5	–	3	–	0	7	–	4	–	0
No. 8 LSU	3	–	3	–	0	8	–	3	–	0
Georgia	3	–	3	–	0	6	–	4	–	0
Kentucky	3	–	3	–	0	6	–	4	–	0
Vanderbilt	1	–	5	–	0	2	–	7	–	1
Tulane	1	–	5	–	0	2	–	8	–	0
Mississippi State	1	–	5	–	0	4	–	6	–	0
$ – Conference champion; Tennessee's game against South Carolina and Georgia's game against Clemson counted in the conference standings.; Rankings from AP Poll

The 1965 Alabama Crimson Tide football team (variously "Alabama", "UA" or "Bama") represented the University of Alabama in the 1965 NCAA University Division football season. It was the Crimson Tide's 71st overall and 32nd season as a member of the Southeastern Conference (SEC). The team was led by head coach Bear Bryant, in his eighth year, and played their home games at Denny Stadium in Tuscaloosa, Legion Field in Birmingham and Ladd Stadium in Mobile, Alabama. They finished season with nine wins, one loss and one tie (9–1–1 overall, 6–1–1 in the SEC), as SEC champions and with a victory over Nebraska in the Orange Bowl. Alabama was also recognized as national champions by the AP Poll after their Orange Bowl win.

Alabama opened the season ranked No. 5, but were upset by Georgia 18–17 in the first game of the season. They rebounded with their first win of the season over Tulane and followed that with a 17–16 win over Ole Miss in a game in which Alabama had to rally from a nine-point fourth quarter deficit for the victory. The next week, the Crimson Tide defeated Vanderbilt in Nashville before they returned home for their rivalry game against Tennessee. Against the Volunteers, the score was deadlocked 7–7 in the closing seconds, but Alabama had driven to the Tennessee four-yard line. Ken Stabler believing that it was third down, threw the ball out of bounds with six seconds left to stop the clock. However, it was actually fourth down, possession went to Tennessee, and the game ended in a tie.

After the tie, the Crimson Tide won five in a row over Florida State, Mississippi State, LSU, South Carolina and Auburn en route to Bryant's fourth SEC title at Alabama. Because the Associated Press was holding its vote until after the bowl games instead of before for the first time, No. 4 Alabama still had a chance to win the national championship when they played No. 3 Nebraska in the Orange Bowl. On New Year's Day, No. 1 Michigan State lost in the Rose Bowl and No. 2 Arkansas lost in the Cotton Bowl Classic, and Alabama defeated Nebraska 39–28 in the Orange Bowl and captured its third AP National Championship in five years.

== Schedule ==
Date	Opponent	Rank	Site	TV	Result	Attendance	Source
September 18	at Georgia	No. 5	Sanford Stadium; Athens, GA (rivalry)	NBC	L 17–18	42,500	
September 25	Tulane		Ladd Stadium; Mobile, AL		W 27–0	33,321	
October 2	Ole Miss		Legion Field; Birmingham, AL (rivalry)		W 17–16	65,677	
October 9	at Vanderbilt		Dudley Field; Nashville, TN		W 22–7	29,268	
October 16	Tennessee		Legion Field; Birmingham, AL (Third Saturday in October)		T 7–7	65,680	
October 23	Florida State*^{†}		Denny Stadium; Tuscaloosa, AL		W 21–0	43,066	
October 30	at Mississippi State	No. 10	Mississippi Veterans Memorial Stadium; Jackson, MS (rivalry)		W 10–7	45,876	
November 6	at LSU	No. 5	Tiger Stadium; Baton Rouge, LA (rivalry)	NBC	W 31–7	58,953	
November 13	South Carolina*	No. 5	Denny Stadium; Tuscaloosa, AL		W 35–14	38,776	
November 27	vs. Auburn	No. 5	Legion Field; Birmingham, AL (Iron Bowl)		W 30–3	66,333	
January 1, 1966	vs. No. 3 Nebraska*	No. 4	Miami Orange Bowl; Miami, FL (Orange Bowl)	NBC	W 39–28	72,214	
*Non-conference game; ^{†}Homecoming; Rankings from AP Poll released prior to the game; Source:

== Game summaries ==
=== Georgia ===
Team	1	2	3	4	Total
#5 Alabama	0	3	7	7	17
• Georgia	0	10	0	8	18

- Date: September 18
- Location: Sanford Stadium
  Athens, GA
- Game attendance: 42,500

To open the 1965 season, the No. 5 Crimson Tide were upset by the Georgia Bulldogs 18–17 at Athens. After a scoreless first quarter, Georgia took a 10–0 lead on a 37-yard Bob Etter field goal and when George Patton intercepted a Steve Sloan pass and returned it 55-yards for a touchdown in the second quarter. Alabama then made the halftime score 10–3 with a 26-yard David Ray field goal. The Crimson Tide then tied the game in the third on an eight-yard Steve Bowman run and took their only lead of the game in the fourth on a two-yard Sloan touchdown run. The Bulldogs then scored their second touchdown late in the fourth quarter when Pat Hodgson lateraled a Kirby Moore pass to Bob Taylor who took it 73-yards for a touchdown. Georgia then successfully made a two-point conversion that gave them an 18–17 victory.

=== Tulane ===
Team	1	2	3	4	Total
Tulane	0	0	0	0	0
• Alabama	10	7	7	3	27

- Date: September 25
- Location: Ladd Stadium
  Mobile, AL
- Game attendance: 31,920

After their loss to Georgia in the season opener, the Crimson Tide dropped out of the rankings prior to their game against Tulane. At Mobile, the Crimson Tide shutout the Green Wave 27–0 in their annual Ladd Stadium game of the season. The Crimson Tide took a 10–0 first quarter lead on a 37-yard David Ray field goal followed by a one-yard Leslie Kelley touchdown run, and then extended it to 17–0 at halftime with a 29-yard Steve Sloan touchdown pass to Tommy Tolleson in the second. Alabama then closed the game with a 15-yard Sloan touchdown pass to Richard Thompson in the third and a 25-yard Ray field goal in the fourth for the 27–0 win.

=== Ole Miss ===
Team	1	2	3	4	Total
Ole Miss	3	6	0	7	16
• Alabama	0	7	0	10	17

- Date: October 2
- Location: Legion Field
  Birmingham, AL
- Game attendance: 65,677

For their third game of the season, Alabama met rival Ole Miss during the regular season for the first time since the 1944 season. In a night game at Legion Field, a nine-yard Steve Sloan touchdown run with just over a minute left in the game gave Alabama a 17–16 victory over the Rebels. Ole Miss took an early 3–0 lead on a 34-yard Jimmy Keyes field goal in the first quarter and then extended it to 9–0 in the second on an eight-yard James Heidel touchdown pass to Donald Street. Sloan then got Alabama on the scoreboard near the end of the second quarter on a five-yard touchdown run that made the halftime score 9–7. After a scoreless third, the Rebels extended their lead to 16–7 on a one-yard Heidel touchdown run before the Crimson Tide rallied for the victory.

David Ray scored first with his 37-yard field goal that made the score 16–10 in favor of Ole Miss, and then with 1:19 left in the game Sloan scored the game-tying touchdown on a nine-yard run. On the next play, Ray successfully converted the extra point and gave Alabama a 17–16 lead. The Crimson Tide then secured the victory on the next play when the Rebels' Stan Moss fumbled kickoff that was recovered by Alabama who then ran out the clock and won the game.

=== Vanderbilt ===
Team	1	2	3	4	Total
• Alabama	0	0	0	22	22
Vanderbilt	0	7	0	0	7

- Date: October 9
- Location: Dudley Field
  Nashville, TN
- Game attendance: 30,066

After they trailed for the majority of the game, Alabama rallied with 22 fourth quarter points and defeated the Commodores 22–7 at Nashville. After a scoreless first quarter, the Commodores took a 7–0 lead after Charles Boyd returned a punt 69-yards for a touchdown in the second. Vanderbilt remained in the lead through the fourth quarter when Alabama scored a trio of touchdowns. Steve Bowman scored first on a two-yard run, followed by a 35-yard John Reitz interception return and then on a 57-yard Bowman run late in the game.

=== Tennessee ===
Third Saturday in October

Team	1	2	3	4	Total
Tennessee	0	7	0	0	7
Alabama	0	7	0	0	7

- Date: October 16
- Location: Legion Field
  Birmingham, AL
- Game attendance: 65,680

In a game that saw multiple turnovers result in failed touchdown opportunities, Alabama tied the rival Tennessee Volunteers 7–7 at Legion Field. After a scoreless first quarter, both teams scored their only touchdown in the second. Stan Mitchell scored first for the Vols on a one-yard run and Steve Sloan followed for Alabama with his one-yard run. The Crimson Tide had a chance to win the game in the final minute of the game. With only 0:36 remaining in the game, Alabama had possession at the Tennessee six-yard line. However, Alabama quarterback Ken Stabler thought the Tide gained a first down on the previous play and threw the ball out-of-bounds on a fourth down play and turned the ball over on downs back to the Vols. Tennessee then ran out the clock for the tie.

=== Florida State ===
Team	1	2	3	4	Total
Florida State	0	0	0	0	0
• Alabama	7	6	0	8	21

- Date: October 23
- Location: Denny Stadium
  Tuscaloosa, AL
- Game attendance: 43,066

In what was their first all-time game against Florida State, the Crimson Tide shutout the Seminoles 21–0 on homecoming in Tuscaloosa. Alabama took a 13–0 halftime lead after Leslie Kelley scored on a one-yard touchdown run in the first and Steve Sloan scored on a two-yard touchdown run in the second quarter. After a scoreless third, the Crimson Tide closed the game with a second one-yard Kelley touchdown run in the fourth quarter coupled with a Ken Stabler two-point conversion that made the final score 21–0.

=== Mississippi State ===
Team	1	2	3	4	Total
• #10 Alabama	7	0	3	0	10
Mississippi State	0	0	7	0	7

- Date: October 30
- Location: Mississippi Veterans Memorial Stadium
  Jackson, MS
- Game attendance: 45,876

At the Mississippi Veterans Memorial Stadium, a pair of Bobby Johns turnovers in the fourth quarter preserved a 10–7 win over the Mississippi State Bulldogs. The Crimson Tide took an early 7–0 lead after Steve Sloan threw a 65-yard touchdown pass to Dennis Homan in the first quarter. They then extended their lead to 10–0 in the third quarter on a 27-yard David Ray field goal before the Bulldogs scored their only points on an eleven-yard Ashby Cook touchdown pass to Marcus Rhoden later in the quarter. In the fourth, Johns preserved the Crimson Tide win with his blocked field goal and interception late in the game.

=== LSU ===
Team	1	2	3	4	Total
• #5 Alabama	7	17	7	0	31
LSU	0	0	0	7	7

- Date: November 6
- Location: Tiger Stadium
  Baton Rouge, LA
- Game attendance: 58,953

After their victory over Mississippi State, Alabama moved into the No. 5 position in the AP Poll prior to their game against LSU. Against the Tigers, the Crimson Tide won 31–7 at Tiger Stadium. Alabama scored their first touchdown early on a 45-yard Steve Sloan pass to Dennis Homan for a 7–0 first quarter lead. 17 second quarter points scored on a two-yard Steve Bowman run, a six-yard Sloan pass to David Ray and a 41-yard Ray field goal made the halftime score 24–0 in favor of the visitors. After Bowman scored on a 35-yard run in the third, LSU scored their only points in the fourth on a 53-yard Pat Screen touchdown pass to Joe Labruzzo that made the final score 31–7.

=== South Carolina ===
Team	1	2	3	4	Total
South Carolina	0	0	7	7	14
• #5 Alabama	7	0	14	14	35

- Date: November 13
- Location: Denny Stadium
  Tuscaloosa, AL
- Game attendance: 38,776

In their second non-conference game of the season, Alabama defeated the South Carolina Gamecocks 35–14 at Denny Stadium. The Crimson Tide took an early 7–0 lead after Steve Sloan scored on a two-yard touchdown run in the first quarter. After they extended their lead on a two-yard Steve Bowman touchdown run, the Gamecocks responded with their first touchdown on a seven-yard Michael L. Fair pass to J. R. Wilburn that made the score 14–7. Alabama then scored a pair of touchdowns on Sloan passes to Dennis Homan, the first from 50 and the second from 39 yards. South Carolina answered with a two-yard Phil Branson touchdown run and then Alabama with a two-yard Ken Stabler touchdown run that made the final score 35–14. In the game, Sloan eclipsed the previous team records for both pass completions and yardage in a single season formerly held by Joe Namath.

=== Auburn ===
Iron Bowl

Team	1	2	3	4	Total
Auburn	0	3	0	0	3
• #5 Alabama	6	9	8	7	30

- Date: November 27
- Location: Legion Field
  Birmingham, AL
- Game attendance: 66,333

In the annual Iron Bowl game, Alabama defeated the Auburn Tigers 30–3 and secured their second consecutive SEC championship. Alabama took a 15–0 lead late into the second quarter with Steve Sloan touchdown passes of 11-yards to Tommy Tolleson, 33-yards to Ray Perkins and a 27-yard David Ray field goal. Auburn then ended the shutout bid just before halftime on a 44-yard Don Lewis field goal that made the score 15–3. The Crimson Tide then closed the game with a two-yard Leslie Kelley touchdown in the third and a 29-yard Sloan touchdown pass to Don Shankles in the fourth that made the final score 30–3.

=== Nebraska ===
Orange Bowl

Team	1	2	3	4	Total
• #4 Alabama	7	17	8	7	39
#3 Nebraska	0	7	6	15	28

- Date: January 1, 1966
- Location: Miami Orange Bowl
  Miami, FL
- Game attendance: 72,214

For the second year in a row, Alabama played in the Orange Bowl. In the 1966 edition of the game, the Crimson Tide defeated the Nebraska Cornhuskers 39–28 and finished the season 9–1–1 and as AP national champions.

== National championship claim ==
The NCAA recognizes consensus national champions as the teams that have captured a championship by way of one of the major polls since the 1950 NCAA University Division football season. As they entered the Orange Bowl, the Crimson Tide was ranked fourth by the AP behind Michigan State, Arkansas and Nebraska. After losses by the Spartans and Razorbacks in their bowl game coupled with an Alabama victory over Nebraska in their contest, the AP, voting after the bowls for the first time, vaulted the Crimson Tide into the No. 1 position in the final poll of the season and won the national championship. Michigan State was also recognized as national champions by various other selectors for the 1965 season, including the UPI Coaches Poll.

== NFL/AFL Draft ==
Several players that were varsity lettermen from the 1965 squad were drafted into the National Football League (NFL) and the American Football League (AFL) between the 1966 and 1968 drafts. These players included the following:

Year	Round	Overall	Player name	Position	NFL/AFL team
1966 NFL draft	11	156	Steve Sloan	Quarterback	Atlanta Falcons
1966 NFL draft	15	216	Tom Tolleson	Wide receiver	Atlanta Falcons
1966 NFL draft	15	226	Steve Bowman	Running back	New York Giants
1966 AFL draft	17	150	Tom Tolleson	Wide receiver	New York Jets
1966 AFL draft	20	179	Steve Bowman	Halfback	Oakland Raiders
1967 NFL/AFL draft	1	26	Leslie Kelley	Running back Linebacker	New Orleans Saints
1967 NFL/AFL draft	4	82	Louis Thompson	Defensive tackle	New York Giants
1967 NFL/AFL draft	4	91	Wayne Trimble	Wide receiver	San Francisco 49ers
1967 NFL/AFL draft	9	230	Cecil Dowdy	Linebacker	Cleveland Browns
1968 NFL/AFL draft	1	20	Dennis Homan	Wide receiver	Dallas Cowboys
1968 NFL/AFL draft	2	52	Ken Stabler	Quarterback	Oakland Raiders
1968 NFL/AFL draft	12	320	Bobby Johns	Defensive back	Kansas City Chiefs

== Freshman squad ==
Prior to the 1972 NCAA University Division football season, NCAA rules prohibited freshmen from participating on the varsity team, and as such many schools fielded freshmen teams. The Alabama freshmen squad finished the 1965 season with a record of three wins and one loss (3–1). The Baby Tide opened their season with a 7–6 loss at Mississippi State. After a scoreless first quarter, the Bulldogs took a 7–0 lead in the second when Ronnie Coleman threw an 11-yard touchdown pass to Harry Ivey. Although the Alabama defense only allowed State only two first downs for the remainder of the game, the Baby Tide lost 7–6 after a failed two-point conversion attempt that followed a 26-yard Joe Kelley touchdown pass to Donnie Sutton.

Alabama then won their first game of the season at Denny Stadium with a 27–14 victory over Ole Miss. Ole Miss took an early 7–0 lead on a 12-yard Jimmy Wallis touchdown pass to Glenn Cannon. Alabama responded with the next four touchdowns and took a 27–7 lead. Touchdowns were scored on runs of 19-yards by Dave Beddingfield, 25-yards by Mickey Lee, three-yards by Frank Chambers run and on a 61-yard Kelley pass to Conrad Fowler. The Rebels then scored their final points as time expired on a 73-yard Terry Collier touchdown pass to Cannon. In their third game, Alabama defeated Tennessee 19–8 at Neyland Stadium. Alabama took an early 7–0 lead after Donnie Johnston scored on a two-yard touchdown run in the first quarter. After a pair of Myles Prestige field goals, the Baby Tide extended their lead to 19–0 with a second half touchdown. Tennessee responded late with their only touchdown on a four-yard Nick Showalter touchdown run in the fourth quarter.

Two weeks later, Alabama closed the season with a 30–6 victory over rival Auburn at Cliff Hare Stadium. After Baby Tide took a 7–0 first quarter lead on short Frank Chambers run, Auburn scored their only points on a 96-yard return by Larry Ellis on the kickoff that ensued. The Baby Tide then closed the game with 23 unanswered points scored on a one-yard Kelley run, a 20-yard Prestige field goal, a 52-yard Don Matthews punt return and on a nine-yard Johnston reverse.

== Personnel ==
=== Varsity letter winners ===
Player	Hometown	Position
Tim Bates	Tarrant, Alabama	Linebacker
David Bedwell	Cedar Bluff, Alabama	Defensive back
Steve Bowman	Pascagoula, Mississippi	Fullback
Richard Brewer	Sylacauga, Alabama	Split end
John Calvert	Cullman, Alabama	Guard
Frank Canterbury	Birmingham, Alabama	Halfback
Jimmy Carroll	Enterprise, Alabama	Center
David Chatwood	Fairhope, Alabama	Fullback
Richard Cole	Crossville, Alabama	Defensive tackle
Wayne Cook	Montgomery, Alabama	Tight end
Paul Crane	Prichard, Alabama	Center
Steve Davis	Columbus, Georgia	Placekicker
Cecil Dowdy	Cherokee, Alabama	Offensive tackle
Jerry Duncan	Sparta, North Carolina	Offensive tackle
Jim Fuller	Fairfield, Alabama	Tackle
Creed Gilmer	Birmingham, Alabama	Defensive end
Allen 'Bunk' Harpole	Columbus, Mississippi	Defensive guard
Charles Harris	Mobile, Alabama	Defensive end
Dennis Homan	Muscle Shoals, Alabama	Split end
Bobby Johns	Birmingham, Alabama	Defensive back
Billy Johnson	Selma, Alabama	Center
Leslie Kelley	Cullman, Alabama	Fullback
Terry Killgore	Annandale, Virginia	Center
Ben McLeod Jr.	Pensacola, Florida	Defensive end
Harold Moore	Chattanooga, Tennessee	Fullback
John Mosley	Thomaston, Alabama	Halfback
Stan Moss	Birmingham, Alabama	Left end
Ray Perkins	Petal, Mississippi	End
Gene Raburn	Jasper, Alabama	Fullback
David Ray	Phenix City, Alabama	Placekicker
John Reitz	Morristown, Tennessee	Defensive end
Jackie Sherrill	Biloxi, Mississippi	Fullback
Steve Sloan	Cleveland, Tennessee	Quarterback
Tom Somerville	White Station, Tennessee	Offensive guard
Ken Stabler	Foley, Alabama	Quarterback
Bruce Stephens	Thomasville, Alabama	Guard
Lynwood Strickland	Alexander City, Alabama	Defensive end
Johnny Sullivan	Nashville, Tennessee	Defensive tackle
Louis Thompson	Lebanon, Tennessee	Defensive tackle
Richard Thompson	Thomasville, Alabama	Halfback
Tommy Tolleson	Talladega, Alabama	End
Wayne Trimble	Cullman, Alabama	Quarterback
Frank Whaley	Lineville, Alabama	Defensive end
John Williams	Decatur, Alabama	Guard

=== Coaching staff ===
Name	Position	Seasons at Alabama	Alma mater
Bear Bryant	Head coach/Athletic Director	8	Alabama (1936)
Sam Bailey	Assistant coach	8	Ouachita Baptist (1949)
Ken Donahue	Assistant coach	2	Tennessee (1951)
Pat Dye	Assistant coach	1	Georgia (1962)
Ralph Genito	Assistant coach	1	Kentucky (1950)
Jim Goostree	Assistant coach (head athletic trainer)	9	Tennessee (1952)
Clem Gryska	Assistant coach	6	Alabama (1948)
Dude Hennessey	Assistant coach	6	Kentucky (1955)
Carney Laslie	Assistant coach	9	Alabama (1934)
Ken Meyer	Assistant coach	3	Denison (1950)
Mal Moore	Assistant coach	2	Alabama (1962)
Dee Powell	Assistant coach	3	Texas A&M (1957)
Hayden Riley	Assistant coach	8	Alabama (1948)
Howard Schnellenberger	Assistant coach	5	Kentucky (1956)
Jimmy Sharpe	Assistant coach	3	Alabama (1962)
Richard Williamson	Assistant coach	2	Alabama (1963)
