= 1965 Ole Miss Rebels football team =

American college football season

1965 Ole Miss Rebels football

Liberty Bowl champion

Liberty Bowl, W 13–7 vs. Auburn
- Conference: Southeastern Conference

Ranking
- Coaches: No. 17
- Record: 7–4 (5–3 SEC)
- Head coach: Johnny Vaught (19th season)
- Home stadium: Hemingway Stadium; Mississippi Veterans Memorial Stadium

1965 Southeastern Conference football standings
	Conf.					Overall
Team	W		L		T	W		L		T
No. 1 Alabama $	6	–	1	–	1	9	–	1	–	1
Auburn	4	–	1	–	1	5	–	5	–	1
No. 7 Tennessee	3	–	1	–	2	8	–	1	–	2
Florida	4	–	2	–	0	7	–	4	–	0
Ole Miss	5	–	3	–	0	7	–	4	–	0
No. 8 LSU	3	–	3	–	0	8	–	3	–	0
Georgia	3	–	3	–	0	6	–	4	–	0
Kentucky	3	–	3	–	0	6	–	4	–	0
Vanderbilt	1	–	5	–	0	2	–	7	–	1
Tulane	1	–	5	–	0	2	–	8	–	0
Mississippi State	1	–	5	–	0	4	–	6	–	0
$ – Conference champion; Tennessee's game against South Carolina and Georgia's game against Clemson counted in the conference standings.; Rankings from AP Poll

The 1965 Ole Miss Rebels football team represented the University of Mississippi in the sport of American football during the 1965 NCAA University Division football season. The team won seven games and lost four. It concluded the season with a 13–7 victory over Auburn in the 1965 Liberty Bowl.

Quarterback Jimmy Heidel led the team in passing, completing 52 of 95 attempts for 586 yards and three touchdowns. Running back Mike Dennis led the team in both rushing and receiving, with 525 and 246 yards respectively. Dennis, defensive tackle Jim Urbanek, and offensive guard Stan Hindman were each first-team selections by both the Associated Press (AP) and United Press International for the 1965 All-SEC football team, and offensive guard Jim Harvey earned second-team honors from the AP.

== Schedule ==
Date	Opponent	Site	Result	Attendance	Source
September 18	at Memphis State*	Memphis Memorial Stadium; Memphis, TN (rivalry)	W 34–14	50,160	
September 25	at No. 10 Kentucky	McLean Stadium; Lexington, KY	L 7–16	38,000	
October 2	at Alabama	Legion Field; Birmingham, AL (rivalry)	L 16–17	68,000	
October 9	No. 10 Florida	Hemingway Stadium; Oxford, MS	L 0–17	27,500–30,006	
October 16	Tulane	Mississippi Veterans Memorial Stadium; Jackson, MS (rivalry)	W 24–7	20,000	
October 23	Vanderbilt	Hemingway Stadium; Oxford, MS (rivalry)	W 24–7	16,000	
October 30	No. 5 LSU	Mississippi Veterans Memorial Stadium; Jackson, MS (rivalry)	W 23–0	46,616	
November 6	at Houston*	Astrodome; Houston, TX	L 3–17	38,197	
November 13	vs. No. 8 Tennessee	Memphis Memorial Stadium; Memphis, TN (rivalry)	W 14–13	40,181	
November 27	at Mississippi State	Scott Field; Starkville, MS (Egg Bowl)	W 21–0	35,000	
December 18	vs. Auburn	Memphis Memorial Stadium; Memphis, TN (Liberty Bowl, rivalry)	W 13–7	38,607	
*Non-conference game; Rankings from AP Poll released prior to the game

== Personnel ==
1965 Ole Miss Rebels football team roster
Players			Coaches
Offense: Pos. / # / Name / Class; RB / / Mike Dennis (C) / Sr	Defense: Pos. / # / Name / Class	Special teams: Pos. / # / Name / Class	Head coach: Johnny Vaught; Coordinators/assistant coaches Legend: (C) Team captain; (S) Suspended; (I) Ineligible; Injured; Redshirt
