= 1965 NCAA University Division football season =

American college football season

- Preseason AP No. 1: Nebraska
- Regular season: September 17 – December 4, 1965
- Number of bowls: 8
- Bowl games: December 18, 1965 – January 1, 1966
- Champion(s): Alabama (AP, FWAA); Michigan State (Coaches, FWAA, NFF)
- Heisman: USC halfback Mike Garrett

During the 20th century, the NCAA had no playoff for the major college football teams in the University Division, later known as Division I-A. The NCAA did recognize a national champion based upon the final results of "wire service" (AP and UPI) polls. The "writers' poll" by Associated Press (AP) was the most popular, followed by the "coaches' poll" by United Press International) (UPI). Prior to 1965, both services issued their final polls at the close of the regular season, but before teams competed in bowl games. For the 1965 season, the AP took its final poll after the postseason games, an arrangement made permanent in 1968. The Associated Press presented the "AP Trophy" to the winner.

The AP poll in 1965 consisted of the votes of 55 sportswriters, each of whom would give their opinion of the ten best teams. Under a point system of ten points for first place, nine for second, etc., the "overall" ranking was determined. In the preseason poll for 1965, the writers cast first place votes for nine different teams, and the range of points between the highest six finishers ranged from 252 to 311 points. Nebraska was first, followed by Texas, Notre Dame, Michigan, Alabama, and Arkansas. As the regular season progressed, new polls were issued weekly on Mondays.

At the end of the regular season, Michigan State, Arkansas, and Nebraska were all unbeaten at 10–0. As champions of their respective conferences (Big Ten, Southwest, and Big Eight), they played in three separate bowl games (Rose, Cotton, and Orange) on New Year's Day. Arkansas and Michigan State lost during the day, and Alabama defeated Nebraska at night in Miami. In the final poll, taken after the bowls, Alabama was crowned the national champion by the Associated Press. The Crimson Tide had been first in both final polls at the end of the 1964 regular season and crowned as national champions, but lost the Orange Bowl.

In addition to 1964 and 1965, the UPI national champions in 1970 and 1973 also lost their respective bowl games. Beginning with the 1974 season, the UPI released its final poll after the bowls.

== Rule changes ==
- Free substitution is now permitted only on changes of possession, which brought back the two-platoon system to college football.
- A two-inch (5 cm) kicking tee was allowed for kickoffs; this was reduced to one-inch (2½ cm) in 2006.

== Conference and program changes ==
- The New England Football Conference, now a Division III conference, began football play in 1965.

School	1964 Conference	1965 Conference
East Carolina Pirates	Independent	Southern
Detroit Titans	Independent	dropped program
VPI Hokies	Southern	Independent

== September ==
In Week One (September 18) No. 5 Alabama and No. 7 USC both fell out of the Top Ten. USC played Minnesota to a 20–20 tie on a Friday night game in Los Angeles while Alabama narrowly lost to Georgia, 18–17. No. 1 Nebraska beat Texas Christian (TCU) at home, 34–14. No. 2 Texas shut out Tulane 31–0 in a game which was shifted from New Orleans to Austin due to the devastation of Hurricane Betsy across the Crescent City. No. 3 Notre Dame crushed California 48–6 at Berkeley, and No. 4 Michigan won 31–24 at North Carolina. No. 6 Arkansas beat Oklahoma State 28–14. Following its big win, Notre Dame rose to No. 1 in the next poll, Nebraska and Texas fell to 2nd and 3rd, Michigan stayed at No. 4 and Arkansas was No. 5. In a matchup which would later have national championship implications, Michigan State defeated UCLA 13–3 at East Lansing.

On September 25, No. 1 Notre Dame stayed in Indiana as it lost to No. 6 Purdue 25–21 at West Lafayette. No. 2 Nebraska won 27–17 over Air Force in Colorado Springs, and No. 3 Texas beat Texas Tech 33–7. No. 4 Michigan barely won over unranked California 10–7 and No. 5 Arkansas defeated Tulsa 20–12. No. 7 LSU won 42–14 over Rice. In the next poll, Texas, Purdue and Nebraska had had 15, 14 and 13 first place votes in a tight race for No. 1, No. 2 and No. 3. Arkansas rose to No. 4, while LSU placed fifth. Michigan State entered the poll at No. 9 with a 23−0 shutout of Penn State.

== October ==
October 2, No. 1 Texas hosted Indiana and won 27–12. No. 2 Purdue played SMU to a 14–14 tie in Dallas. No. 3 Nebraska shut out Iowa State 44–0, while No. 4 Arkansas blanked TCU 28–0. In an SEC matchup at Gainesville, visiting No. 5 LSU fell to the Florida Gators 14–7. No. 10 Georgia beat No. 7 Michigan 15–7 in Ann Arbor, while No. 9 Michigan State beat Illinois at home, 22–12. The next poll was No. 1 Texas, No. 2 Nebraska, No. 3 Arkansas, No. 4 Georgia, and No. 5 Michigan State.

In October 9 play, all five of the top teams remained unbeaten. No. 1 Texas shut out Oklahoma, 19–0 at Dallas. No. 2 Nebraska held visiting Wisconsin scoreless 37–0. No. 3 Arkansas won at Baylor 38–7 and No. 4 Georgia beat Clemson at home, 23–9. No. 5 Michigan State followed Georgia's visit to Ann Arbor with one of its own, beating Michigan 24–7. The Spartans and Bulldogs traded places in the next poll, which was No. 1 Texas, No. 2 Nebraska, No. 3 Arkansas, No. 4 Michigan State, and No. 5 Georgia.

On October 16, No. 1 Texas met No. 3 Arkansas at Fayetteville in a Southwest Conference matchup between two 4–0 teams, and Arkansas won 27–24. Meanwhile, No. 2 Nebraska recorded its third straight shutout, a 41–0 win at Kansas State. In a game that ultimately decided the Big Ten title, No. 4 Michigan State beat Ohio State 32–7, and No. 5 Georgia lost 10–3 to Florida State at Tallahassee. No. 6 USC beat Stanford 14–0 and remained unbeaten at 4–0–1. Arkansas was the new No. 1 in the next poll, followed by No. 2 Michigan State, No. 3 Nebraska, No. 4 USC, and No. 5 Texas.

October 23: No. 1 Arkansas defeated North Texas State 55–20 at Little Rock, No. 2 Michigan State won 14–10 at No. 6 Purdue, and No. 3 Nebraska beat Colorado 38–13. No. 4 USC fell 28–7 to No. 7 Notre Dame at South Bend, and No. 5 Texas lost its second straight game, falling 20–17 to Rice. After their 4–0 start, the Longhorns finished the season at 6–4. No. 9 LSU beat South Carolina 21–7. In the next poll, Michigan State received fewer first place votes than Arkansas, but had seven more points overall, 473–466, while Nebraska was third. The three teams were the last to remain unbeaten, all with 6–0 records. Notre Dame was No. 4 and LSU was No. 5.

October 30 No. 1 Michigan State overwhelmed Northwestern 49–7 at home in East Lansing. Playing in Little Rock, No. 2 Arkansas shut out Texas A&M 31–0. No. 3 Nebraska won a close one, 16–14, at Missouri and No. 4 Notre Dame won 29–3 over Navy. No. 5 LSU was shut out at home by Mississippi, 23–0. Meanwhile, No. 10 Alabama beat Mississippi State 10–7 at Jackson. The next poll featured No. 1 Michigan State, No. 2 Arkansas, No. 3 Nebraska, No. 4 Notre Dame, and No. 5 Alabama.

== November ==
On November 6, No. 1 Michigan State won 35–0 at Iowa, No. 2 Arkansas won 31–0 at Rice, and No. 3 Nebraska won 42–6 over Kansas. All three remained unbeaten, with 8–0 records. No. 4 Notre Dame rolled over host Pittsburgh 69–13, and No. 5 Alabama won 31–7 at LSU. The top five remained the same.

November 13 The top three extended their records to 9–0. No. 1 Michigan State beat Indiana 27–13 to guarantee itself the Big Ten title and a trip to Pasadena for the Rose Bowl. No. 2 Arkansas beat SMU 24–3 at Dallas. No. 3 Nebraska had a surprisingly difficult game against 1–6 Oklahoma State, winning 21–17 at Stillwater, but still clinched the Big 8 title and a berth in the Orange Bowl. No. 4 Notre Dame shut out visiting North Carolina, 17–0, and No. 5 Alabama beat South Carolina 35–14 at home. The top five again remained the same.

November 20: With its Big Ten title assured, No. 1 Michigan State visited its most difficult opponent yet, No. 4 Notre Dame, with hopes of finishing its season unbeaten. The Spartans won, 12–3. Though unbeaten, No. 2 Arkansas was only a game ahead of No. 9 Texas Tech (6–0 vs. 5–1) in SWC play. The two met at Arkansas, and the Razorbacks beat the Red Raiders 42–24 to get a spot in the Cotton Bowl. No. 3 Nebraska and No. 5 Alabama had the week off. In Los Angeles, No. 7 UCLA beat No. 6 USC 20–16 to win the AAWU (Pac-8) title, a Rose Bowl berth, and the opportunity to avenge their early-season loss to Michigan State. Unranked LSU destroyed Tulane 62–0 (the third time in the past eight meetings the Tigers defeated the Green Wave by that score) and earned a berth in the Cotton Bowl opposite Arkansas. The next poll featured No. 1 Michigan State, No. 2 Arkansas, No. 3 Nebraska, No. 4 UCLA, and No. 5 Alabama.

Thanksgiving Day, No. 3 Nebraska beat Oklahoma at home in Lincoln, 21–9 to finish with a 10−0 record. No. 5 Alabama met Auburn (which was surprisingly undefeated in SEC play despite losing three of their four non-conference games) in their annual season closer at Birmingham on Saturday. The Crimson Tide beat the Tigers 30–3. For the second straight year, SEC champion Alabama would play in the Orange Bowl rather than the Sugar Bowl; the latter game matched No. 6 Missouri against Florida. The next AP Poll was No. 1 Michigan State, No. 2 Arkansas, No. 3 Nebraska, No. 4 Alabama, and No. 5 UCLA.

On the following December 4, No. 5 UCLA lost to No. 7 Tennessee 37–34 in a game marred by a questionable pass interference call and the clock stopping for no apparent reason during Tennessee's last-minute drive. However, the Bruins were not penalized by the AP voters, who did not release a poll after this week. Instead, the AP planned to take its final poll after the bowl games, as its top six teams were all playing on New Year's Day.

== Conference standings ==
1965 Athletic Association of Western Universities football standings
	Conf.					Overall
Team	W		L		T	W		L		T
No. 4 UCLA $	4	–	0	–	0	8	–	2	–	1
No. 10 USC	4	–	1	–	0	7	–	2	–	1
Washington State	2	–	1	–	0	7	–	3	–	0
Washington	4	–	3	–	0	5	–	5	–	0
Stanford	2	–	3	–	0	6	–	3	–	1
California	2	–	3	–	0	5	–	5	–	0
Oregon State	1	–	3	–	0	5	–	5	–	0
Oregon	0	–	5	–	0	4	–	5	–	1
$ – Conference champion; Rankings from AP Poll

1965 Atlantic Coast Conference football standings
	Conf.					Overall
Team	W		L		T	W		L		T
NC State +	5	–	2	–	0	6	–	4	–	0†
Clemson +	5	–	2	–	0	5	–	5	–	0†
Duke	4	–	2	–	0	6	–	4	–	0
Maryland	3	–	3	–	0	4	–	6	–	0
North Carolina	3	–	3	–	0	4	–	6	–	0
Virginia	3	–	3	–	0	4	–	6	–	0†
Wake Forest	2	–	4	–	0	3	–	7	–	0†
South Carolina	0	–	6	–	0	5	–	5	–	0†
+ – Conference co-champions; † South Carolina forfeited its 4 conference wins (Clemson, NC State, Virginia, Wake Forest) due to use of ineligible players. This improved Clemson and NC State from 4–3 to 5–2, making them co-champions. Overall records did not change due to the forfeits. Duke and South Carolina were originally co-champions with records of 4–2.

1965 Big Eight Conference football standings
	Conf.					Overall
Team	W		L		T	W		L		T
No. 5 Nebraska $	7	–	0	–	0	10	–	1	–	0
No. 6 Missouri	6	–	1	–	0	8	–	2	–	1
Colorado	4	–	2	–	1	6	–	2	–	2
Iowa State	3	–	3	–	1	5	–	4	–	1
Oklahoma	3	–	4	–	0	3	–	7	–	0
Oklahoma State	2	–	5	–	0	3	–	7	–	0
Kansas	2	–	5	–	0	2	–	8	–	0
Kansas State	0	–	7	–	0	0	–	10	–	0
$ – Conference champion; Rankings from AP Poll

1965 Big Sky Conference football standings
	Conf.					Overall
Team	W		L		T	W		L		T
Weber State +	3	–	1	–	0	8	–	1	–	0
Idaho +	3	–	1	–	0	5	–	5	–	0
Montana	2	–	2	–	0	4	–	6	–	0
Idaho State	1	–	3	–	0	3	–	5	–	1
Montana State	1	–	3	–	0	3	–	7	–	0
+ – Conference co-champions

1965 Big Ten Conference football standings
	Conf.					Overall
Team	W		L		T	W		L		T
No. 2 Michigan State $	7	–	0	–	0	10	–	1	–	0
Ohio State	6	–	1	–	0	7	–	2	–	0
Purdue	5	–	2	–	0	7	–	2	–	1
Minnesota	5	–	2	–	0	5	–	4	–	1
Illinois	4	–	3	–	0	6	–	4	–	0
Northwestern	3	–	4	–	0	4	–	6	–	0
Michigan	2	–	5	–	0	4	–	6	–	0
Wisconsin	2	–	5	–	0	2	–	7	–	1
Indiana	1	–	6	–	0	2	–	8	–	0
Iowa	0	–	7	–	0	1	–	9	–	0
$ – Conference champion; Rankings from AP Poll

1965 Ivy League football standings
	Conf.					Overall
Team	W		L		T	W		L		T
Dartmouth $	7	–	0	–	0	9	–	0	–	0
Princeton	6	–	1	–	0	8	–	1	–	0
Harvard	3	–	2	–	2	5	–	2	–	2
Cornell	3	–	3	–	1	4	–	3	–	2
Yale	3	–	4	–	0	3	–	6	–	0
Penn	2	–	4	–	1	4	–	4	–	1
Brown	1	–	6	–	0	2	–	7	–	0
Columbia	1	–	6	–	0	2	–	7	–	0
$ – Conference champion

1965 Mid-American Conference football standings
	Conf.					Overall
Team	W		L		T	W		L		T
Bowling Green +	5	–	1	–	0	7	–	2	–	0
Miami (OH) +	5	–	1	–	0	7	–	3	–	0
Western Michigan	3	–	2	–	1	6	–	2	–	1
Kent State	3	–	2	–	1	5	–	4	–	1
Marshall	2	–	4	–	0	5	–	5	–	0
Toledo	2	–	4	–	0	5	–	5	–	1
Ohio	0	–	6	–	0	0	–	10	–	0
+ – Conference co-champions

1965 Middle Three Conference football standings
	Conf.					Overall
Team	W		L		T	W		L		T
Rutgers +	1	–	1	–	0	3	–	6	–	0
Lafayette +	1	–	1	–	0	3	–	7	–	0
Lehigh +	1	–	1	–	0	1	–	8	–	0
+ – Conference co-champions

1965 Missouri Valley Conference football standings
	Conf.					Overall
Team	W		L		T	W		L		T
Tulsa $	4	–	0	–	0	8	–	3	–	0
Louisville	2	–	1	–	0	6	–	4	–	0
North Texas State	2	–	2	–	0	3	–	7	–	0
Cincinnati	1	–	2	–	0	5	–	5	–	0
Wichita State	0	–	4	–	0	2	–	7	–	0
$ – Conference champion

1965 Southeastern Conference football standings
	Conf.					Overall
Team	W		L		T	W		L		T
No. 1 Alabama $	6	–	1	–	1	9	–	1	–	1
Auburn	4	–	1	–	1	5	–	5	–	1
No. 7 Tennessee	3	–	1	–	2	8	–	1	–	2
Florida	4	–	2	–	0	7	–	4	–	0
Ole Miss	5	–	3	–	0	7	–	4	–	0
No. 8 LSU	3	–	3	–	0	8	–	3	–	0
Georgia	3	–	3	–	0	6	–	4	–	0
Kentucky	3	–	3	–	0	6	–	4	–	0
Vanderbilt	1	–	5	–	0	2	–	7	–	1
Tulane	1	–	5	–	0	2	–	8	–	0
Mississippi State	1	–	5	–	0	4	–	6	–	0
$ – Conference champion; Tennessee's game against South Carolina and Georgia's game against Clemson counted in the conference standings.; Rankings from AP Poll

1965 Southern Conference football standings
	Conf.					Overall
Team	W		L		T	W		L		T
West Virginia $	4	–	0	–	0	6	–	4	–	0
William & Mary	5	–	1	–	0	6	–	4	–	0
East Carolina	3	–	1	–	0	9	–	1	–	0
VMI	3	–	2	–	0	3	–	7	–	0
George Washington	4	–	3	–	0	5	–	5	–	0
The Citadel	4	–	4	–	0	4	–	6	–	0
Davidson	2	–	3	–	0	6	–	4	–	0
Furman	2	–	3	–	0	5	–	5	–	0
Richmond	0	–	6	–	0	0	–	10	–	0
$ – Conference champion

1965 Southwest Conference football standings
	Conf.					Overall
Team	W		L		T	W		L		T
No. 3 Arkansas $	7	–	0	–	0	10	–	1	–	0
Texas Tech	5	–	2	–	0	8	–	3	–	0
TCU	5	–	2	–	0	6	–	5	–	0
Texas	3	–	4	–	0	6	–	4	–	0
Baylor	3	–	4	–	0	5	–	5	–	0
SMU	3	–	4	–	0	4	–	5	–	1
Texas A&M	1	–	6	–	0	3	–	7	–	0
Rice	1	–	6	–	0	2	–	8	–	0
$ – Conference champion; Rankings from AP Poll

1965 Western Athletic Conference football standings
	Conf.					Overall
Team	W		L		T	W		L		T
BYU $	4	–	1	–	0	6	–	4	–	0
Arizona State	3	–	1	–	0	6	–	4	–	0
Wyoming	3	–	2	–	0	6	–	4	–	0
New Mexico	2	–	3	–	0	3	–	7	–	0
Utah	1	–	3	–	0	3	–	7	–	0
Arizona	1	–	4	–	0	3	–	7	–	0
$ – Conference champion

1965 NCAA University Division independents football records
	Conf.			Overall
Team	W	L	T	W		L		T
New Mexico State		–		8	–	2	–	0
Utah State		–		8	–	2	–	0
Xavier		–		8	–	2	–	0
Texas Western		–		8	–	3	–	0
No. 9 Notre Dame		–		7	–	2	–	1
Southern Miss		–		7	–	2	–	0
Syracuse		–		7	–	3	–	0
Virginia Tech		–		7	–	3	–	0
Georgia Tech		–		7	–	3	–	1
Boston College		–		6	–	4	–	0
West Texas State		–		6	–	4	–	0
Boston University		–		5	–	3	–	1
Buffalo		–		5	–	3	–	2
Miami (FL)		–		5	–	4	–	1
Penn State		–		5	–	5	–	0
Memphis State		–		5	–	5	–	0
San Jose State		–		5	–	5	–	0
Navy		–		4	–	4	–	2
Colgate		–		4	–	5	–	1
Florida State		–		4	–	5	–	1
Army		–		4	–	5	–	1
Houston		–		4	–	5	–	1
Colorado State		–		4	–	6	–	0
Air Force		–		3	–	6	–	1
Pittsburgh		–		3	–	7	–	0
Dayton		–		3	–	7	–	0
Holy Cross		–		2	–	7	–	1
Villanova		–		1	–	8	–	0
Rankings from AP Poll

== Bowl games ==
=== Major bowls ===
Saturday, January 1, 1966

BOWL				
COTTON	No. 14 LSU Tigers	14	No. 2 Arkansas Razorbacks	7
SUGAR	No. 6 Missouri Tigers	20	No. 12 Florida Gators	18
ROSE	No. 5 UCLA Bruins	14	No. 1 Michigan State Spartans	12
ORANGE	No. 4 Alabama Crimson Tide	39	No. 3 Nebraska Cornhuskers	28

The top three teams in the polls were upset, starting with LSU's 14–7 win over No. 2 Arkansas in the Cotton Bowl. Then came an even bigger stunner, as 13-point underdog UCLA bested top-ranked Michigan State in the Rose Bowl, 14–12. Trailing by eight points, Michigan State scored a touchdown in the final minute but the two-point conversion attempt to tie was stopped just short of the goal line. With the top two teams defeated, the Orange Bowl game that night between No. 3 Nebraska and No. 4 Alabama would determine the national champion. Alabama, led by QB Steve Sloan, beat Nebraska 39–28 to claim the national title. The final AP poll, released three days after the bowls, was No. 1 Alabama, No. 2 Michigan State, No. 3 Arkansas, No. 4 UCLA, and No. 5 Nebraska.

=== Other bowls ===
BOWL	Location	Date	Winner	Score	Runner-up
SUN	El Paso, TX	December 31	Texas Western	13–12	TCU
GATOR	Jacksonville, FL	December 31	Georgia Tech	31–21	No. 10 Texas Tech
BLUEBONNET	Houston, TX	December 18	No. 7 Tennessee	27–6	No. 16 Tulsa
LIBERTY	Memphis, TN	December 18	No. 17 Mississippi	13–7	Auburn

- Prior to the 1975 season, the Big Ten and Pac-8 (AAWU) conferences allowed only one postseason participant each, for the Rose Bowl.
- Notre Dame did not play in the postseason for 44 consecutive seasons (1925–1968).

== Heisman Trophy voting ==
The Heisman Trophy is given to the year's most outstanding player

Player	School	Position	1st	2nd	3rd	Total
Mike Garrett	USC	RB	179	143	103	926
Howard Twilley	Tulsa	WR	101	78	69	528
Jim Grabowski	Illinois	FB	97	72	46	481
Donny Anderson	Texas Tech	HB	78	57	60	408
Floyd Little	Syracuse	HB	51	42	50	287
Steve Juday	Michigan State	QB	53	40	42	281
Tommy Nobis	Texas	LB	27	37	50	205
Bob Griese	Purdue	QB	32	36	25	193
Steve Spurrier	Florida	QB	17	14	14	93
Steve Sloan	Alabama	QB	18	15	8	92

== See also ==
- 1965 NCAA University Division football rankings
- 1965 College Football All-America Team
- 1965 NCAA College Division football season
- 1965 NAIA football season
