= 1965 Tennessee Volunteers football team =

American college football season

1965 Tennessee Volunteers football

Bluebonnet Bowl champion

Bluebonnet Bowl, W 27–6 vs. Tulsa
- Conference: Southeastern Conference

Ranking
- Coaches: No. 7
- AP: No. 7
- Record: 8–1–2 (3–1–2 SEC)
- Head coach: Doug Dickey (2nd season)
- Home stadium: Neyland Stadium

1965 Southeastern Conference football standings
	Conf.					Overall
Team	W		L		T	W		L		T
No. 1 Alabama $	6	–	1	–	1	9	–	1	–	1
Auburn	4	–	1	–	1	5	–	5	–	1
No. 7 Tennessee	3	–	1	–	2	8	–	1	–	2
Florida	4	–	2	–	0	7	–	4	–	0
Ole Miss	5	–	3	–	0	7	–	4	–	0
No. 8 LSU	3	–	3	–	0	8	–	3	–	0
Georgia	3	–	3	–	0	6	–	4	–	0
Kentucky	3	–	3	–	0	6	–	4	–	0
Vanderbilt	1	–	5	–	0	2	–	7	–	1
Tulane	1	–	5	–	0	2	–	8	–	0
Mississippi State	1	–	5	–	0	4	–	6	–	0
$ – Conference champion; Tennessee's game against South Carolina and Georgia's game against Clemson counted in the conference standings.; Rankings from AP Poll

The 1965 Tennessee Volunteers football team (variously "Tennessee", "UT" or the "Vols") represented the University of Tennessee as a member of the Southeastern Conference (SEC) during the 1965 NCAA University Division football season. Led by second-year head coach Doug Dickey, the Volunteers compiled an overall record of 8–1–2 with a mark of 3–1–2, in conference play, tying for third place in the SEC. Tennessee was invited to the Bluebonnet Bowl, where the Volunteers defeated Tulsa. The team played home games at Neyland Stadium in Knoxville, Tennessee.

== Schedule ==
Date	Opponent	Rank	Site	TV	Result	Attendance	Source
September 18	Army*		Neyland Stadium; Knoxville, TN		W 21–0	48,500	
September 25	Auburn		Neyland Stadium; Knoxville, TN (rivalry)		T 13–13	43,614	
October 9	South Carolina (Note: Tennessee's game against South Carolina counted in the SEC standings.)^{†}		Neyland Stadium; Knoxville, TN (rivalry)		W 24–3	38,519	
October 16	at Alabama		Legion Field; Birmingham, AL (Third Saturday in October)		T 7–7	65,680	
October 23	Houston*		Neyland Stadium; Knoxville, TN		W 17–8	34,504	
November 6	No. 7 Georgia Tech*		Neyland Stadium (rivalry)		W 21–7	52,174	
November 13	vs. Ole Miss	No. 8	Memphis Memorial Stadium; Memphis, TN (rivalry)	NBC	L 13–14	40,181	
November 20	at Kentucky		McLean Stadium; Lexington, KY (rivalry)		W 19–3	38,000	
November 27	Vanderbilt	No. 9	Neyland Stadium; Knoxville, TN (rivalry)		W 21–3	36,248	
December 4	No. 5 UCLA*	No. 7	Memphis Memorial Stadium; Memphis, TN		W 37–34	44,495	
December 18	vs. Tulsa	No. 7	Rice Stadium; Houston, TX (Bluebonnet Bowl)	NBC	W 27–6	40,000	
*Non-conference game; ^{†}Homecoming; Rankings from AP Poll released prior to the game

== Personnel ==
1965 Tennessee Volunteers football team roster
Players			Coaches
Offense: Pos. / # / Name / Class; QB / 16 / Dewey Warren / So	Defense: Pos. / # / Name / Class	Special teams: Pos. / # / Name / Class	Head coach: Doug Dickey; Coordinators/assistant coaches Legend: (C) Team captain; (S) Suspended; (I) Ineligible; Injured; Redshirt

== Team players drafted into the NFL ==
Player	Position	Round	Pick	NFL club
Tom Fisher	Linebacker	3	40	New York Giants
Frank Emanuel	Linebacker	4	52	Philadelphia Eagles
Stan Mitchell	Fullback	8	115	Washington Redskins
Austin Denney	End	11	160	Dallas Cowboys
Bob Petrella	Defensive back	12	181	Minnesota Vikings
Hal Wantland	Halfback	16	235	Washington Redskins
