= 1965 Bluebonnet Bowl =

Tennessee Volunteers	Tulsa Golden Hurricane
(7–1–2)	(8–2)
27	6
Head coach: Doug Dickey	Head coach: Glenn Dobbs
AP / Coaches; 7 / 7	AP / Coaches; NR / 16
	1	2	3	4	Total
Tennessee	6	14	7	0	27
Tulsa	6	0	0	0	6
- Date: December 18, 1965
- Season: 1965
- Stadium: Rice Stadium
- Location: Houston, Texas
- MVP: QB Dewey Warren (Tennessee)
- Attendance: 40,000

United States TV coverage
- Network: NBC

The 1965 Bluebonnet Bowl was a college football postseason bowl game that featured the Tennessee Volunteers and the Tulsa Golden Hurricane.

== Background ==
The Golden Hurricane finished as champions of the Missouri Valley Conference. This was the second straight bowl season, the first time they had gone to bowl games in consecutive seasons since 1941-45. The Volunteers sprung up #8 after an upset of #7 Georgia Tech. A loss to Ole Miss the next week dropped them, but three consecutive victories led them back to the Top 10 in the polls in their first bowl game since 1957.

== Game summary ==
Hal Wantland gave the Vols a 6–0 lead after a Tulsa fumble led to his 4-yard touchdown catch from Warren a few plays later. The Golden Hurricane made it 6–6 on a Gary McDermott touchdown plunge. Dewey Warren ran for three touchdowns, and Stan Mitchell added in an 11-yard run of his own to contribute to 21 straight points for the Vols. Tulsa had three fumbles and four passes intercepted.

== Aftermath ==
Tulsa did not return to a bowl game until 1976. Tennessee began a bowl streak and went to a bowl game every year until 1974.
