= 1965 Liberty Bowl =

American college football game

- 7th Liberty Bowl
Ole Miss Rebels	Auburn Tigers
(6–4)	(5–4–1)
SEC	SEC
13	7
Head coach: Johnny Vaught	Head coach: Ralph Jordan
AP / Coaches; NR / 17
	1	2	3	4	Total
Ole Miss	0	3	7	3	13
Auburn	0	7	0	0	7
- Date: December 18, 1965
- Season: 1965
- Stadium: Memphis Memorial Stadium
- Location: Memphis, Tennessee
- MVP: FB Tom Bryan, Auburn
- Referee: E.D. Cavette (SEC)
- Attendance: 38,607

The 1965 Liberty Bowl was a college football postseason bowl game between the Auburn Tigers and the Ole Miss Rebels, both of the Southeastern Conference (SEC). Played on December 18, 1965, it was the seventh edition of the Liberty Bowl and was won by Ole Miss, 13–7.

== Background ==
The Rebels had finished 4th in the Southeastern Conference (SEC), a rise from the prior year's 7th-place finish. This was the Rebels' 9th straight bowl appearance. As for the Tigers, they finished 2nd in the SEC after tying Tennessee in the beginning of the season and losing to Alabama in the Iron Bowl. This was the first Liberty Bowl played in Memphis, Tennessee, after five editions in Philadelphia and one edition in Atlantic City, New Jersey. The bowl has been played at Liberty Bowl Memorial Stadium (originally known as Memphis Memorial Stadium) ever since.

== Game summary ==
Jimmy Keyes gave the Rebels a 3–0 lead on his 42-yard field goal in the second quarter. With 6:58, Tom Bryan rushed for a touchdown from 44 yards out to make it 7-3 Auburn. Doug Cunningham caught a six-yard touchdown pass from Jody Graves to make it 10-7 Rebels in the third quarter. Keyes made it 13–7 on his 30-yard field goal in the following quarter. Auburn had one last chance, reaching the Ole Miss 9. With 33 seconds later, Alex Bowden was sacked on 4th down, clinching the victory for the Rebels. In a losing effort, Tom Bryan rushed for 111 yards on 19 carries.

== Aftermath ==
Ole Miss reached three more bowl games before the end of the decade. Auburn did not return to a bowl game again until the 1968 Sun Bowl. They later faced Ole Miss in the 1971 Gator Bowl (January).

== Statistics ==
Statistics	Ole Miss	Auburn
First downs	12	15
Rushing yards	189	156
Passing yards	24	112
Total yards	213	268
Passing (C-A-I)	4-12-0	11-24-1
Punts-average	9-34.8	8-39
Fumbles-lost	0-0	0-0
Penalties-yards	5-25	4-29

== See also ==
- Auburn–Ole Miss football rivalry
