= 1965 LSU Tigers football team =

American college football season

1965 LSU Tigers football

Cotton Bowl, W 14–7 vs. Arkansas
- Conference: Southeastern Conference

Ranking
- Coaches: No. 14
- AP: No. 8
- Record: 8–3 (3–3 SEC)
- Head coach: Charles McClendon (4th season)
- Home stadium: Tiger Stadium

1965 Southeastern Conference football standings
| | Conf. | | | | | Overall |
| Team | W | | L | | T | W | | L | | T |
|---|---|---|---|---|---|---|---|---|---|---|
| No. 1 Alabama $ | 6 | – | 1 | – | 1 | 9 | – | 1 | – | 1 |
| Auburn | 4 | – | 1 | – | 1 | 5 | – | 5 | – | 1 |
| No. 7 Tennessee | 3 | – | 1 | – | 2 | 8 | – | 1 | – | 2 |
| Florida | 4 | – | 2 | – | 0 | 7 | – | 4 | – | 0 |
| Ole Miss | 5 | – | 3 | – | 0 | 7 | – | 4 | – | 0 |
| No. 8 LSU | 3 | – | 3 | – | 0 | 8 | – | 3 | – | 0 |
| Georgia | 3 | – | 3 | – | 0 | 6 | – | 4 | – | 0 |
| Kentucky | 3 | – | 3 | – | 0 | 6 | – | 4 | – | 0 |
| Vanderbilt | 1 | – | 5 | – | 0 | 2 | – | 7 | – | 1 |
| Tulane | 1 | – | 5 | – | 0 | 2 | – | 8 | – | 0 |
| Mississippi State | 1 | – | 5 | – | 0 | 4 | – | 6 | – | 0 |
$ – Conference champion; Tennessee's game against South Carolina and Georgia's game against Clemson counted in the conference standings.; Rankings from AP Poll

The 1965 LSU Tigers football team was an American football team that represented Louisiana State University (LSU) as a member of the Southeastern Conference (SEC) during the 1965 NCAA University Division football season. In their fourth year under head coach Charles McClendon, the Tigers compiled an overall record of 8–3 with a conference record of 3–3 the SEC, placing in a three-way tie for sixth place in the SEC.

Back-to-back losses to Ole Miss and Alabama put LSU's bowl hopes in peril, but wins over Mississippi State and Tulane prompted the Cotton Bowl to extend a bid to the 7-–3 Tigers. The bowl's faith in LSU was rewarded when the Tigers stunned No. 2 Arkansas, 14–7, to stop the Razorbacks' winning streak at 22 games and deny Arkansas a second consecutive national championship.

== Schedule ==
Destruction from Hurricane Betsy on September 10 put the season opener vs. Texas A&M in jeopardy. Repairs to the light towers, scoreboard and press box were made in time for the game to proceed as planned eight days later.

LSU defeated rival Tulane by a 62-0 tally for the third time in eight seasons (1958 and 1961) in the Green Wave's final football game as a member of the Southeastern Conference. It was also LSU's third consecutive shutout of Tulane at Baton Rouge.

| Date | Time | Opponent | Rank | Site | TV | Result | Attendance | Source |
|---|---|---|---|---|---|---|---|---|
| September 18 | 8:00 pm | Texas A&M* | No. 8 | Tiger Stadium; Baton Rouge, LA (rivalry) | | W 10–0 | 68,000 | |
| September 25 | 8:00 pm | Rice* | No. 7 | Tiger Stadium; Baton Rouge, LA | | W 42–14 | 67,500 | |
| October 2 | 1:00 pm | at Florida | No. 5 | Florida Field; Gainesville, FL (rivalry) | | L 7–14 | 47,592 | |
| October 9 | 7:00 pm | at Miami (FL)* | | Miami Orange Bowl; Miami, FL | | W 34–27 | 43,367 | |
| October 16 | 8:00 pm | Kentucky^{†} | | Tiger Stadium; Baton Rouge, LA | | W 31–21 | 68,000 | |
| October 23 | 8:00 pm | South Carolina* | No. 9 | Tiger Stadium; Baton Rouge, LA | | W 21–7 | 66,000 | |
| October 30 | 2:00 pm | at Ole Miss | No. 5 | Mississippi Veterans Memorial Stadium; Jackson, MS (rivalry) | | L 0–23 | 46,616 | |
| November 6 | 1:15 pm | No. 5 Alabama | | Tiger Stadium; Baton Rouge, LA (rivalry) | NBC | L 7–31 | 58,000 | |
| November 13 | 8:00 pm | Mississippi State | | Tiger Stadium; Baton Rouge, LA (rivalry) | | W 37–20 | 60,000 | |
| November 20 | 8:00 pm | Tulane | | Tiger Stadium; Baton Rouge, LA (Battle for the Rag) | | W 62–0 | 65,000 | |
| January 1, 1966 | 12:30 pm | vs. No. 2 Arkansas* | | Cotton Bowl; Dallas, TX (Cotton Bowl, rivalry) | CBS | W 14–7 | 76,200 | |
*Non-conference game; ^{†}Homecoming; Rankings from AP Poll released prior to the game
