= 1966 Cotton Bowl Classic (January) =

- 30th Cotton Bowl Classic
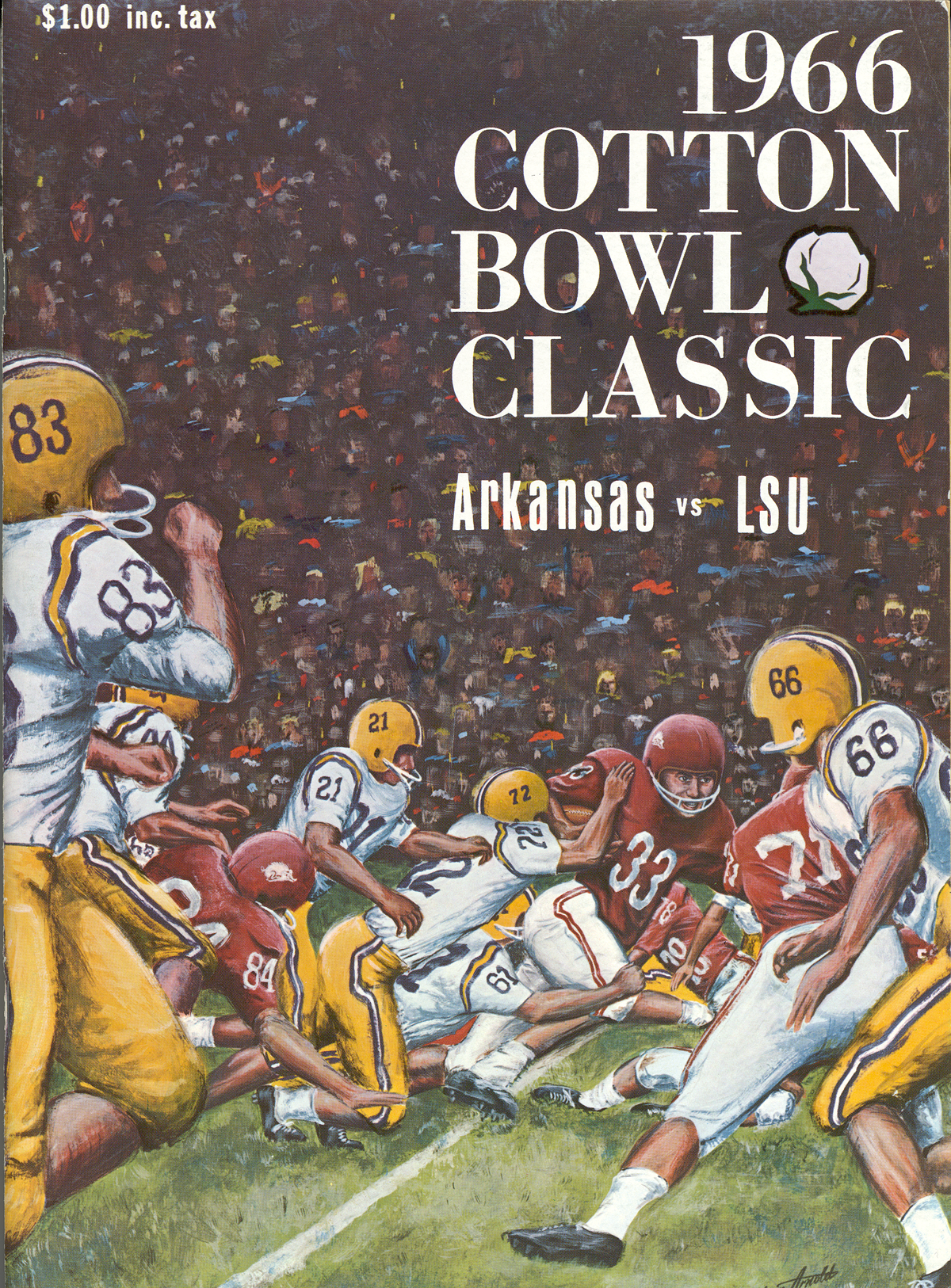
LSU Tigers	Arkansas Razorbacks
(7–3)	(10–0)
SEC	SWC
14	7
Head coach: Charles McClendon	Head coach: Frank Broyles
AP / Coaches; NR / 14	AP / Coaches; 2 / 2
	1	2	3	4	Total
LSU	0	14	0	0	14
Arkansas	7	0	0	0	7
- Date: January 1, 1966
- Season: 1965
- Stadium: Cotton Bowl
- Location: Dallas, Texas
- MVP: TB Joe Labruzzo (LSU); T David McCormick (LSU)
- Referee: James Artley (SEC; split crew: SEC, SWC)
- Attendance: 76,200

United States TV coverage
- Network: CBS

The Cotton Bowl in Dallas, Texas, hosted the Cotton Bowl Classic.

The 1966 Cotton Bowl Classic was a post-season college football bowl game of the 1965 season with national championship implications between the Southwest Conference champion Arkansas Razorbacks and the LSU Tigers of the Southeastern Conference. With a scoreless second half at the Cotton Bowl in Dallas, LSU defeated Arkansas 14–7 in front of 76,200 spectators on Saturday, January 1, 1966.

The top three teams in the polls were all defeated on this New Year's Day.

== Setting ==
Arkansas and LSU's rivalry had been discontinued since 1956, and Arkansas had not beaten the Bayou Bengals since 1929. This was the second Cotton Bowl Classic meeting, after the Hogs and Tigers met nineteen years earlier, in January 1947. The game, sometimes referred to as the Ice Bowl, ended as scoreless tie in the rain and subfreezing cold.

Arkansas and LSU had a common opponent in 1965 in Rice, whom both defeated. The Tigers won 42–14 in Baton Rouge in late September, and Arkansas shut out the Owls 31–0 in Houston in early November.

=== Arkansas ===
Bobby Burnett tied three others in scoring, with 16 TD's, the fourth-highest total in the nation. Ronny South was second in kick scoring, with 42 extra points and 6 field goals. As an offensive unit, the Hogs had the best scoring offense (32.4 ppg), the eighth-best rushing offense (226.1 ypg), seventh best total offense (360.2 ypg) nationally. The defense was fourth-best against the run (74.9 yards allowed per game). Glen Ray Hines was a consensus All-American.

Arkansas, defending FWAA national champions, entered the game on a 22-game winning streak. The 1965 Hogs defeated the #1 Texas Longhorns and #9 Texas Tech Red Raiders in Fayetteville, Arkansas. Despite this, the Razorbacks were ranked #1 for only one week, during which they defeated North Texas 55–20. #2 Michigan State beat #6 Purdue on the same weekend, giving the Spartans the #1 spot in the AP Poll.

=== LSU ===
LSU entered the game with a 7–3 record, with conference losses at Florida and Ole Miss, and Alabama at home.

== Game summary ==
The Arkansas Razorbacks put their 22-game win streak on the line in the 1966 Cotton Bowl Classic against their rivals, the Tigers of LSU. Arkansas had the number one scoring offense coming into the game, averaging 32.4 points per contest.

Arkansas took the ball to the end zone on the opening drive, capped by a 19-yard toss from Jon Brittenum to All-American end Bobby Crockett. Running back Joe LaBruzzo then ran in from three yards out for the Bengal Tigers to tie the game at 7. Razorback QB Brittenum then left the game after suffering a shoulder injury and the Hogs fumbled the ball three plays later. LaBruzzo again scored, this time from one yard away, giving the Tigers a 14–7 halftime lead.

Neither team scored in the second half, and Arkansas ended the game on the LSU 24-yard line. Razorback Bobby Crockett set a bowl record with 10 catches for 129 yards.

Scoring summary

Quarter	Time	Drive			Team	Scoring information	Score	
Quarter	Time	Plays	Yards	TOP	Team	Scoring information	ARK	LSU
1	3:35		87	11	ARK	Bobby Crockett 19-yard touchdown reception from Harry Wilson, Ronny South kick good	7	0
2	4:15		80	16	LSU	Joe LaBruzzo 3-yard touchdown run, Doug Moneau kick good	7	7
2	0:18		34	7	LSU	Joe LaBruzzo 1-yard touchdown run, Doug Moneau kick good	7	14
"TOP" = time of possession. For other American football terms, see Glossary of American football.							7	14
