= 1965 Florida Gators football team =

American college football season

1965 Florida Gators football

Sugar Bowl, L 18–20 vs. Missouri
- Conference: Southeastern Conference

Ranking
- Coaches: No. 12
- Record: 7–4 (4–2 SEC)
- Head coach: Ray Graves (6th season)
- Offensive coordinator: Ed Kensler (1st season)
- Defensive coordinator: Gene Ellenson (2nd season)
- Home stadium: Florida Field

1965 Southeastern Conference football standings
	Conf.					Overall
Team	W		L		T	W		L		T
No. 1 Alabama $	6	–	1	–	1	9	–	1	–	1
Auburn	4	–	1	–	1	5	–	5	–	1
No. 7 Tennessee	3	–	1	–	2	8	–	1	–	2
Florida	4	–	2	–	0	7	–	4	–	0
Ole Miss	5	–	3	–	0	7	–	4	–	0
No. 8 LSU	3	–	3	–	0	8	–	3	–	0
Georgia	3	–	3	–	0	6	–	4	–	0
Kentucky	3	–	3	–	0	6	–	4	–	0
Vanderbilt	1	–	5	–	0	2	–	7	–	1
Tulane	1	–	5	–	0	2	–	8	–	0
Mississippi State	1	–	5	–	0	4	–	6	–	0
$ – Conference champion; Tennessee's game against South Carolina and Georgia's game against Clemson counted in the conference standings.; Rankings from AP Poll

The 1965 Florida Gators football team represented the University of Florida during the 1965 NCAA University Division football season. The season was Ray Graves's sixth year as the Florida Gators football team's head coach. The highlights of the season included an intersectional road victory over the Northwestern Wildcats of the Big Ten Conference, Southeastern Conference (SEC) wins over the LSU (14–7), Ole Miss Rebels (17–0), Georgia Bulldogs (14–10) and Tulane Green Wave (51–13), and a sound thumping of the in-state rival Florida State Seminoles (30–17). The Gators also lost close matches against the Mississippi State Bulldogs (18–13) and the Miami Hurricanes (16–13). Graves' 1965 Florida Gators finished 7–4 overall and 4–2 in the SEC, tying for third in the 11-team conference.

== Schedule ==
Date	Opponent	Rank	Site	TV	Result	Attendance	Source
September 18	at Northwestern*		Dyche Stadium; Evanston, IL		W 24–14	33,918	
September 25	Mississippi State	No. 8	Florida Field; Gainesville, FL		L 13–18	42,612	
October 2	No. 5 LSU		Florida Field; Gainesville, FL (rivalry)		W 14–7	48,210	
October 9	at Ole Miss	No. 10	Hemingway Stadium; Oxford, MS		W 17–0	27,500–30,006	
October 16	NC State*^{†}	No. 9	Florida Field; Gainesville, FL		W 28–6	48,010	
October 30	at Auburn	No. 7	Cliff Hare Stadium; Auburn, AL (rivalry)	ABC	L 17–28	46,313	
November 6	vs. Georgia		Gator Bowl Stadium; Jacksonville, FL (rivalry)		W 14–10	61,211	
November 13	Tulane		Florida Field; Gainesville, FL		W 51–13	39,616	
November 20	at Miami (FL)*	No. 10	Miami Orange Bowl; Miami, FL (rivalry)		L 13–16	67,762	
November 27	Florida State*		Florida Field; Gainesville, FL (rivalry)		W 30–17	48,626–49,513	
January 1, 1966	vs. No. 6 Missouri*		Tulane Stadium; New Orleans, LA (Sugar Bowl)	NBC	L 18–20	67,421	
*Non-conference game; ^{†}Homecoming; Rankings from AP Poll released prior to the game

== Sugar Bowl ==
At the end of the season, the Gators played the Missouri Tigers in the Gators' first-ever major bowl game, the Sugar Bowl, on January 1, 1966. Despite a three-touchdown second-half effort from the Gators, they lost to the Tigers 18–20 after they failed to score on three consecutive two-point conversion attempts after each of their touchdowns. Following the game, Gators quarterback Steve Spurrier was recognized as the game's Most Valuable Player—the only MVP selected from the losing team in the history of the Sugar Bowl.

== Roster ==
1965 Florida Gators football team roster
Players
Coaches
Offense

Pos.	#	Name	Class
		Charles Casey
QB	11	Steve Spurrier	Jr

Defense

Pos.	#	Name	Class

Special teams

Pos.	#	Name	Class

Head coach

- Ray Graves

Coordinators/assistant coaches

Legend

- (C) Team captain
- (S) Suspended
- (I) Ineligible
- Injured
- Redshirt
