= The Grinder (TV series) =

2015 American legal comedy television series

- Genre: Sitcom
- Created by: Jarrad Paul; Andrew Mogel
- Starring: Rob Lowe; Fred Savage; Mary Elizabeth Ellis; Natalie Morales; Hana Hayes; Connor Kalopsis; William Devane
- Composer: Jeff Cardoni
- Country of origin: United States
- Original language: English
- No. of seasons: 1
- No. of episodes: 22

Production
- Executive producers: Rob Lowe; Scott Silveri; Jake Kasdan; Melvin Mar; Nicholas Stoller; Jarrad Paul; Andrew Mogel; Ben Wexler
- Producer: Niki Schwartz-Wright
- Cinematography: Rhet W. Bear
- Editors: Jeremy Cohen; Tara Timpone; Josh Drisko; Steve Welch
- Camera setup: Single-camera
- Running time: 21–24 minutes
- Production companies: Paul Mogel Network Television; Stoller Global Solutions; The Detective Agency; 20th Century Fox Television

Original release
- Network: Fox
- Release: September 29, 2015 – May 10, 2016

The Grinder is an American legal sitcom television series created by Jarrad Paul and Andrew Mogel for Fox. The show was picked up to series on May 8, 2015, and aired from September 29, 2015 to May 10, 2016. On October 15, 2015, Fox ordered six additional scripts for the first season, potentially increasing the season order to 19 episodes. On October 27, 2015, Fox ordered a full season of 22 episodes for the first season.

Despite being acclaimed by critics and viewers, the show never achieved high ratings. On May 16, 2016, Fox canceled the series after one season.

== Plot ==
The series follows television actor Dean Sanderson Jr., who returns to his hometown of Boise, Idaho, after his long-running fictional television series, The Grinder, ends after eight seasons. Though Dean is not a lawyer, he believes that his experience playing one on television makes him qualified to practice law. He decides to join his family's law firm, Sanderson & Yao, much to the chagrin of his younger brother Stewart, who is an actual lawyer. Stewart and a new hire named Claire are the only people who seem to comprehend that Dean's television experience does not qualify him for a job at a real law firm.

== Cast ==
=== Main ===
- Rob Lowe as Dean Sanderson Jr., an actor who played the role of attorney Mitch Grinder on the long-running fictional legal drama series The Grinder
- Fred Savage as Stewart Sanderson, Dean's younger brother who is a real life attorney
- Mary Elizabeth Ellis as Debbie Sanderson, Stewart's wife and Dean's sister-in-law
- William Devane as Dean Sanderson Sr., the patriarch of the Sanderson family, Dean and Stewart's father and head of the law firm
- Natalie Morales as Claire Lacoste, a new associate in the Jefferson, Sanderson, & Holt law firm who is resistant to Dean's romantic advances
- Hana Hayes as Lizzie Sanderson, Stewart and Debbie's 15-year-old daughter
- Connor Kalopsis as Ethan Sanderson, Stewart and Debbie's 12-year-old son

=== Recurring ===
- Steve Little as Todd, an attorney of questionable skill who works at Jefferson, Sanderson, & Holt, and is also a huge fan of Dean's
- John Owen Lowe as Joel Zadack, Lizzie's boyfriend, they eventually break up after becoming more comfortable hanging out with her family
- Jason Alexander as Cliff Bemis, the creator and head writer for The Grinder TV show, whose constant disagreements with Dean led to Dean leaving the show
- Kumail Nanjiani as Leonard, a prosecuting attorney who gets humiliated by Dean in the courtroom
- Timothy Olyphant as a fictionalized version of himself who becomes Dean's nemesis; he assumes the starring role of Rake Grinder on The Grinder: New Orleans after convincing Dean to quit the show, and then begins dating Claire
- Maya Rudolph as Jillian, Stewart and Dean's therapist, who later becomes Dean's girlfriend, much to Stewart's chagrin
- Matt Hobby as Pat Landy
- Kenny Lucas as Cory Manler, a former Sanderson & Yao client who sues the firm for malpractice
- Keith Lucas as Rory Manler, twin brother of Cory Manler

== Episodes ==
No.	Title	Directed by	Written by	Original release date	Prod. code	U.S. viewers (millions)
1	"Pilot"	Jake Kasdan	Jarrad Paul & Andrew Mogel	September 29, 2015	1AYV01	4.98
Dean Sanderson Jr. is a famed actor who starred in the legal drama series The Grinder for eight seasons. After the series ends, he is left wondering what to do with his life, while temporarily living with his lawyer brother Stewart and his family. With his brother and father both being lawyers, and his experience "practicing law" on television, Dean feels he has what it takes to be an actual lawyer. In doing so, he assists Stewart in a case involving a couple being wrongfully evicted from their apartment building.
2	"A Hero Has Fallen"	Jake Kasdan	Jarrad Paul & Andrew Mogel	October 6, 2015	1AYV02	3.15
Dean encourages the law firm to take the case of a couple that was fired from their job for violating a no-dating policy. Stewart notices that an annoying character from The Grinder is very similar to him, so he decides to be more lenient about life.
3	"The Curious Disappearance of Mr. Donovan"	Jay Chandrasekhar	Dominic Dierkes	October 13, 2015	1AYV04	2.53
When confidential information on a case that the firm is working on leaks, Dean believes that Claire, who is newly hired by Sanderson & Yao, is the mole. Dean then learns that Todd (unintentionally) leaked the information, but he tries to hide it from Stewart because he doesn't want to admit he was wrong. Meanwhile, Ethan and Lizzie refuse to fess up on who deleted an episode of Ray Donovan from the family DVR.
4	"Little Mitchard No More"	John Hamburg	Hayes Davenport	October 20, 2015	1AYV03	2.86
Dean continues to make romantic advances on Claire and tries to meet common ground with her by helping her work on a case involving a school bully. Stewart thinks that his snooty neighbors, the Gerharts, Lyle (Nat Faxon) and Vanessa (Alexie Gilmore), are only being friendly with him and Debbie because they are related to Dean.
5	"A Bittersweet Grind (Une Mouture Amer)"	Matt Sohn	Sean Clements	November 3, 2015	1AYV05	2.52
In an effort to perk up Dean's love life and get him to move out of their house, Stewart and Debbie set up Dean with Gail Budnick (Christina Applegate), an old high school girlfriend. Stewart and Debbie then become worried that Dean is jumping into his relationship with Gail too fast, with him already considering himself the surrogate father of Gail's adult son. Elsewhere, Lizzie gets upset when Stewart and Debbie allow Ethan to bring a girl over, feeling it is a double standard because they won't allow her to date.
6	"Dedicating This One to the Crew"	Phil Traill	Guy Endore-Kaiser	November 10, 2015	1AYV08	2.56
The school play is coming up and Stewart encourages Ethan to join the crew, as he did back in school, but it appears that Ethan would rather follow in the footsteps of his Uncle Dean. When Ethan does not get the role despite Dean's coaching, Dean learns that the drama teacher is a former classmate who still holds a grudge.
7	"Buckingham Malice"	Christine Gernon	Julius Sharpe	November 17, 2015	1AYV07	2.37
Dean becomes tired of getting special treatment because he is a celebrity, and wants to be treated like a regular person. His new way of life leads to him demanding that a cop give him a traffic ticket for running a stop sign, something he would have gotten away with in the past, only to learn that "normal people" often fight their traffic tickets in court. Debbie deals with an incompetent new secretary, whom she does not want to fire after already recently firing two previous secretaries, feeling it will look bad on her.
8	"Giving Thanks, Getting Justice"	Jamie Babbit	Niki Schwartz-Wright	November 24, 2015	1AYV06	2.25
Dean is looking forward to a real family Thanksgiving, and is disappointed when Stewart says the family no longer celebrates it. After some digging, Dean learns it is because Stewart caught his mother and Yao, his dad's law firm partner, in the bedroom five years ago on Thanksgiving, and he hasn't yet told their dad. Making things worse, Dean Sr. indulges his son and decides the family will celebrate Thanksgiving this year, and he invites Yao (Clyde Kusatsu) to attend. Meanwhile, Dean has flashbacks to his final episodes of The Grinder, and his arguments with writer-director Cliff Bemis (Jason Alexander) that led to him departing the series.
9	"Grinder Rests in Peace"	Max Winkler	Sally Bradford McKenna	December 1, 2015	1AYV09	2.41
Cliff Bemis shows up in town wanting Dean to reprise his role as Mitch Grinder in the spin-off series The Grinder: New Orleans, starring Timothy Olyphant as Mitch's brother Rake. Dean is excited about returning, only to later learn that he is being invited back so that his character can be killed off. Dean proposes a different storyline to Bemis, wherein Mitch starts a new life in Key West. Stewart is more than happy to help Dean look for loopholes in his TV contract, seeing this as an opportunity to get his brother out of the house and out of the law firm.
10	"The Olyphant in the Room"	Gail Mancuso	Sean Clements & Dominic Dierkes	January 5, 2016	1AYV13	2.13
Claire's relationship with Timothy Olyphant continues to grow, with a jealous Dean taking the lead in a vandalism case trying to connect Olyphant as the culprit even though both situations have nothing do with each other. A newspaper reporter follows Stewart around for a story, however, the story's focus then takes a turn to be about Dean.
11	"The Exodus (Part 1)"	Jeremy Garelick	Justin Nowell	January 19, 2016	1AYV10	1.97
When Stewart and Debbie ask Dean about his "future plans", he assumes they are kicking him out and takes it badly. Seeing Dean down in the dumps, a rival law firm tries to convince him to come and work for them.
12	"Blood Is Thicker than Justice (Part 2)"	Tristram Shapeero	Bridget Kyle & Vicky Luu	January 26, 2016	1AYV11	2.00
Dean begins working for the law firm Rozz & Landy, and goes up against Stewart in a divorce case. It soon becomes clear to Stewart that Rozz & Landy hired Dean for his celebrity status so he can entertain and impress clients, and Dean eventually catches on. Todd thinks that he and Claire will be the new "will they/won't they" couple in the office with Dean gone, and Claire has some fun playing along. In the end, Dean returns to the firm and drops a bombshell on Stewart and Debbie at home...he has bought and leveled the houses adjacent to their backyard, and plans to build his dream home there.
13	"Grinder v. Grinder"	Eric Appel	Ben Wexler	February 2, 2016	1AYV12	1.65
With Timothy Olyphant now dating Claire, he starts showing up at the law office. When Olyphant gives legal advice based on one of his TV episodes and Stewart says it could actually work, Dean becomes unnerved. Stewart and Claire plot to bring Olyphant back the next day in hopes that it will show Dean how ridiculous he is himself, which leads to Dean and Timothy arguing over who is closer to being a real lawyer. Todd then suggests they hold a mock trial between the two actors to put the issue to rest.
14	"The Retooling of Dean Sanderson"	Dean Holland	Dan Sterling	February 9, 2016	1AYV14	1.91
Stewart says that if Dean is going to be a member of the firm "for the long haul", he needs to me more rooted in reality. He suggests Dean book a session with his therapist, Jillian (Maya Rudolph), but that backfires when Dean shares Jillian's confidential words and advice with Debbie and Stewart. Meanwhile, Dean Sr. gets a letter stating a former client is suing Sanderson & Yao for malpractice.
15	"The Ties That Grind"	Nicholas Stoller	Bridget Kyle & Vicky Luu	February 16, 2016	1AYV15	1.68
Jillian convinces Dean to finally leave The Grinder character and its associated drama behind, but all Stewart sees is that Dean is being dramatic about NOT being dramatic. At the office, Dean Sr. insists on taking the lead in the malpractice suit, shunning Stewart's attempts to help. Meanwhile, Debbie is already bored only a few days after quitting her job, so the family suggests that she be the one to help her father-in-law get organized and prepare for the case.
16	"Delusions of Grinder"	Chad Lowe	Niki Schwartz-Wright	February 23, 2016	1AYV16	1.61
Dean, who is now sleeping with Jillian, takes on the role of an intern at Sanderson & Yao, stating he realizes he's not a lawyer and must start at the bottom. Meanwhile, Stewart is wowed at how prepared malpractice plaintiff Cory Manler (Kenny Lucas) is and suggests he's secretly getting help from another lawyer. His attempt to prove it, however, makes the family and Jillian think he's delusional and just dreaming up conspiracy theories to fill the "drama void" left by Dean.
17	"From the Ashes"	Andy Ackerman	Guy Endore-Kaiser	March 1, 2016	1AYV17	1.61
Dean Sr. finally agrees to let Stewart help on the malpractice case, but only if he teams up with his brother. Stewart reluctantly enlists the help of Jillian and Cliff Bemis to manipulate Dean into returning to his Grinder persona, but Dean has moved on to taking some college law classes and insists he can no longer be associated with his character. In the end, Dean breaks up with Jillian (as a therapist and a girlfriend), and the next morning, the staff arrives to find the Sanderson & Yao offices have been trashed.
18	"Genesis"	Christine Gernon	Justin Nowell	March 15, 2016	1AYV18	1.53
Stewart, with Todd's help, fabricates a scenario that the law firm was ransacked in order to get Dean back in his Grinder mode again and assist in the ongoing case of Dean Sr. getting sued for malpractice. Also, Dean looks back on his struggling acting career ten years ago, when he was living with his then-girlfriend Kelly (Jenna Fischer), who strongly discouraged Dean's aspirations of an acting career. With encouragement from Benji (Chris Klein), another struggling actor, Dean agrees to audition for The Grinder.
19	"A System on Trial"	Jay Chandrasekhar	Jamie Block & Michael Levin	April 12, 2016	1AYV19	1.56
As Stewart tries to prepare Dean Sr. to be cross-examined on the stand in the malpractice trial, he gets frustrated while his dad just gets angry. Dean remembers the focus groups that were used for screenings of The Grinder, and decides to bring one into the firm. While Dean begins to have doubts about whether or not focus groups are truthful, the situation does get Dean Sr. to admit he made a mistake during Cory Manler's original defense. Meanwhile, the concept of focus groups makes everyone else in the Sanderson family re-evaluate their lives.
20	"For the People"	Jamie Babbit	Sean Clements	April 19, 2016	1AYV21	1.50
Lenore (Anne Archer), Stewart's and Dean's mother, pays a surprise visit. Dean Sr. wants to show her he's moved on, so he quickly has Lizzie and Ethan create his online dating profile, where he is set up with a much younger woman named Calista (Chloe Bridges). Knowing that Lenore favors Stewart for settling down and having a family, Dean pretends he's engaged to Claire. Lenore later reveals the real reason she came to town: her 45-year old second husband has left her and she wants to rekindle her relationship with Dean Sr. Meanwhile, Stewart and Debbie both scramble to cover up the fact that each forgot their anniversary.
21	"Divergence"	Andy Ackerman	Sally Bradford McKenna	May 3, 2016	1AYV20	1.51
After watching a Grinder episode where a side story helps Mitch solve the episode's main case, Dean becomes convinced that he needs a real-life side story to solve the mystery that still surrounds Cory Manler's malpractice suit. Thus, he agrees to help Joel, Lizzie's ex-boyfriend, whom she says was wrongly accused of trashing the principal's office. Meanwhile, a number of strange occurrences cause Stewart to keep delaying a meeting with Manler to sign the settlement papers, which Dean and the family see as a sign that Stewart subconsciously wants to take Manler to court rather than settle.
22	"Full Circle"	Jay Chandrasekhar	Dominic Dierkes	May 10, 2016	1AYV22	1.59
Dean figures out that Leonard (Kumail Nanjiani), the prosecutor he humiliated by defeating him in the Pilot episode, is the counsel behind Cory Manler's lawsuit, and that the lawsuit is primarily an act of revenge for Leonard. Just as the case goes to trial, Stewart is suspended by the judge when video surfaces of him breaking into Manler's apartment. Stewart selects Claire to take over first chair, but Dean Sr. overrules him and puts Dean in charge. It appears Leonard is about to win the case when, from the sidelines, Stewart discovers that the plaintiff Cory Manler is in fact his twin brother Rory Manler (Keith Lucas) and Sanderson Sr. is exonerated.

== Reception ==
=== Critical reception ===
On Rotten Tomatoes the season has a rating of 93%, based on 57 reviews, with an average rating of 7.4/10. The site's critical consensus reads, "The Grinder's humor is buoyed by Rob Lowe and Fred Savage's chemistry as a hilarious new odd couple." On Metacritic, the season has a score of 71 out of 100, based on 23 critics, indicating "generally favorable reviews".

=== Accolades ===
Year	Association	Category	Nominee(s)	Result
2016	6th Critics' Choice Television Awards	Best Actor in a Comedy Series	Fred Savage	Nominated
2016	6th Critics' Choice Television Awards	Best Guest Performer in a Comedy Series	Timothy Olyphant	Won
2016	73rd Golden Globe Awards	Best Actor – Television Series Musical or Comedy	Rob Lowe	Nominated
2016	42nd People's Choice Awards	Favorite Actor in a New TV Series	Rob Lowe	Nominated
2016	42nd People's Choice Awards	Favorite New TV Comedy	The Grinder	Nominated
