= 1965 Washington Huskies football team =

American college football season

1965 Washington Huskies football
- Conference: Athletic Association of Western Universities
- Record: 5–5 (4–3 AAWU)
- Head coach: Jim Owens (9th season)
- Captains: Ron Medved; Ralph Winters
- Home stadium: University of Washington Stadium

1965 Athletic Association of Western Universities football standings
	Conf.					Overall
Team	W		L		T	W		L		T
No. 4 UCLA $	4	–	0	–	0	8	–	2	–	1
No. 10 USC	4	–	1	–	0	7	–	2	–	1
Washington State	2	–	1	–	0	7	–	3	–	0
Washington	4	–	3	–	0	5	–	5	–	0
Stanford	2	–	3	–	0	6	–	3	–	1
California	2	–	3	–	0	5	–	5	–	0
Oregon State	1	–	3	–	0	5	–	5	–	0
Oregon	0	–	5	–	0	4	–	5	–	1
$ – Conference champion; Rankings from AP Poll

The 1965 Washington Huskies football team was an American football team that represented the University of Washington during the 1965 NCAA University Division football season. In its ninth season under head coach Jim Owens, the team compiled a 5–5 record, finished in fourth place in the Athletic Association of Western Universities, and outscored its opponents 205 to 185.

Ron Medved and Ralph Winters were the team captains.

== Schedule ==
Date	Opponent	Site	Result	Attendance	Source
September 18	Idaho*	University of Washington Stadium; Seattle, WA	W 14–9	54,500–54,682	
September 25	at Baylor*	Baylor Stadium; Waco, TX	L 14–17	22,000	
October 2	Ohio State*	University of Washington Stadium; Seattle, WA	L 21–23	52,500	
October 9	No. 8 USC	University of Washington Stadium; Seattle, WA	L 0–34	56,000	
October 16	at California	California Memorial Stadium; Berkeley, CA	L 12–16	35,000	
October 23	at Oregon	Multnomah Stadium; Portland, OR (rivalry)	W 24–20	33,437	
October 30	Stanford	University of Washington Stadium; Seattle, WA	W 41–8	51,000	
November 6	at No. 8 UCLA	Los Angeles Memorial Coliseum; Los Angeles, CA	L 24–28	46,084	
November 13	Oregon State	University of Washington Stadium; Seattle, WA	W 28–21	53,500	
November 20	Washington State	University of Washington Stadium; Seattle, WA (Apple Cup)	W 27–9	57,395	
*Non-conference game; Rankings from AP Poll released prior to the game; Source:

== Game summaries ==
=== Washington State ===
Team	1	2	3	4	Total
Washington St	3	6	0	0	9
• Washington	0	20	0	7	27

- Date: November 20
- Location: Husky Stadium Seattle, WA

Scoring summary
1	WSU	Gerela 40-yard field goal	WSU 3-0
2	WASH	O. Parker 28?-yard pass from Hullin (kick failed)	WASH 6-3
2	WASH	Halverson 4-yard run (Martin kick)	WASH 13-3
2	WASH	Williams 54-yard pass from Hullin (Martin kick)	WASH 20-3
2	WSU	Washington 4-yard pass from Roth (kick failed)	WASH 20-9
4	WASH	Medved 38-yard run (Martin kick)	WASH 27-9

== Professional football draft selections ==
Three University of Washington Huskies were selected in the 1966 NFL draft, which lasted 20 rounds with 305 selections. One Husky was selected in the 1966 AFL Draft, which lasted twenty rounds with 181 selections. This was the final year of separate drafts; a common draft was introduced for 1967.

= Husky Hall of Fame

League	Player	Position	Round	Pick	Franchise
NFL	Mason Mitchell	Halfback	10	146	Dallas Cowboys
NFL	Ron Medved	Defensive back	14	204	Philadelphia Eagles
NFL	Steve Orr	Tackle	18	266	Dallas Cowboys
AFL	Fred Forsberg	Linebacker	14	121	Denver Broncos
