= 1965 Pittsburgh Panthers football team =

American college football season

1965 Pittsburgh Panthers football
- Conference: Independent
- Record: 3–7
- Head coach: John Michelosen (11th season)
- Home stadium: Pitt Stadium

1965 NCAA University Division independents football records
| | Conf. | | | Overall |
| Team | W | L | T | W | | L | | T |
|---|---|---|---|---|---|---|---|---|
| New Mexico State | | – | | 8 | – | 2 | – | 0 |
| Utah State | | – | | 8 | – | 2 | – | 0 |
| Xavier | | – | | 8 | – | 2 | – | 0 |
| Texas Western | | – | | 8 | – | 3 | – | 0 |
| No. 9 Notre Dame | | – | | 7 | – | 2 | – | 1 |
| Southern Miss | | – | | 7 | – | 2 | – | 0 |
| Syracuse | | – | | 7 | – | 3 | – | 0 |
| Virginia Tech | | – | | 7 | – | 3 | – | 0 |
| Georgia Tech | | – | | 7 | – | 3 | – | 1 |
| Boston College | | – | | 6 | – | 4 | – | 0 |
| West Texas State | | – | | 6 | – | 4 | – | 0 |
| Boston University | | – | | 5 | – | 3 | – | 1 |
| Buffalo | | – | | 5 | – | 3 | – | 2 |
| Miami (FL) | | – | | 5 | – | 4 | – | 1 |
| Penn State | | – | | 5 | – | 5 | – | 0 |
| Memphis State | | – | | 5 | – | 5 | – | 0 |
| San Jose State | | – | | 5 | – | 5 | – | 0 |
| Navy | | – | | 4 | – | 4 | – | 2 |
| Colgate | | – | | 4 | – | 5 | – | 1 |
| Florida State | | – | | 4 | – | 5 | – | 1 |
| Army | | – | | 4 | – | 5 | – | 1 |
| Houston | | – | | 4 | – | 5 | – | 1 |
| Colorado State | | – | | 4 | – | 6 | – | 0 |
| Air Force | | – | | 3 | – | 6 | – | 1 |
| Pittsburgh | | – | | 3 | – | 7 | – | 0 |
| Dayton | | – | | 3 | – | 7 | – | 0 |
| Holy Cross | | – | | 2 | – | 7 | – | 1 |
| Villanova | | – | | 1 | – | 8 | – | 0 |
Rankings from AP Poll

The 1965 Pittsburgh Panthers football team represented the University of Pittsburgh as an independent during the 1965 NCAA University Division football season. The team compiled a 3–7 record under head coach John Michelosen. The team's statistical leaders included Kenny Lucas with 1,921 passing yards and Barry McKnight with 406 rushing yards.

== Schedule ==
| Date | Opponent | Site | Result | Attendance | Source |
|---|---|---|---|---|---|
| September 18 | Oregon | Pitt Stadium; Pittsburgh, PA | L 15–17 | 31,916 | |
| September 25 | Oklahoma | Pitt Stadium; Pittsburgh, PA | W 13–9 | 24,452 | |
| October 2 | at West Virginia | Mountaineer Field; Morgantown, WV (rivalry) | L 48–63 | 35,000 | |
| October 9 | at Duke | Duke Stadium; Durham, NC | L 13–21 | 25,000 | |
| October 16 | vs. Navy | District of Columbia Stadium; Washington, DC | L 0–12 | 24,183 | |
| October 23 | Miami (FL) | Pitt Stadium; Pittsburgh, PA | W 28–14 | 37,431 | |
| October 30 | vs. Syracuse | Shea Stadium; Flushing, NY (rivalry) | L 13–51 | 24,590 | |
| November 6 | No. 4 Notre Dame | Pitt Stadium; Pittsburgh, PA (rivalry) | L 13–69 | 57,169 | |
| November 13 | at No. 6 USC | Los Angeles Memorial Coliseum; Los Angeles, CA | L 0–28 | 40,339 | |
| November 20 | Penn State | Pitt Stadium; Pittsburgh, PA (rivalry) | W 30–27 | 35,567 | |
Rankings from AP Poll released prior to the game; Source:

== Preseason ==
The de-emphasis of the football program was felt most strongly from 1965 through 1972. Bill Cabin wrote in the April 28, 1965 Pitt News: “Rumors about financial problems have been circulating since November, and Chancellor Edward H. Litchfield admits the university is under financial stress.” Three assistant coaches (Ernie Hefferle, Bill Kaliden, Joe Pullikines) resigned along with head trainer Frank Weichec. Athletic Director Frank Carver dismissed the idea that finances influenced their decisions, but they all received jobs with substantial pay increases. On May 22, while Chancellor Litchfield attempted to solicit donations and funding, he suffered a heart attack. On July 28, he decided to resign and Dr. Stanton C. Crawford was named Acting Chancellor. On August 23, 1966, the University of Pittsburgh became a state-related school.

Athletic Director, Frank Carver, hired former Pitt end Bob Rosborough, former Panther tackle Dick Mills and former Penn and Rutgers head coach John Stiegman to complete Michelosen's staff. Due to the assistant coaching matters, the football staff was able to only recruit 16 incoming freshmen.

On March 18, Coach Michelosen welcomed 67 varsity hopefuls, including 20 lettermen, for spring practice. The NCAA allowed 20 days of practice, but the Pitt trimester break interfered with the calendar. The Blue-White intra-squad game was played on April 24. The Blues beat the Whites 30–25. Halfback Eric Crabtree scored 4 touchdowns for the winners. Quarterback Jim Alcorn threw 2 touchdown passes to end Bob Longo for the losing side.

On Sunday August 22, over 60 Panthers reported to the Stadium for their final camp, under the direction of Coach Michelosen, at Allegheny College. On Monday the squad bussed to Meadville. Tuesday was photo day, and on Wednesday 10 days of two-a-day drills began. On Saturday, September 4 a final scrimmage was played before bussing back to Pittsburgh for 12 more days of preparation prior to their opening game against Oregon.

== Game summaries ==
=== Oregon ===
Week 1:Oregon at Pitt

| Team | 1 | 2 | 3 | 4 | Total |
|---|---|---|---|---|---|
| • Oregon | 0 | 3 | 14 | 0 | 17 |
| Pitt | 0 | 7 | 0 | 8 | 15 |

- Date: September 18, 1965
- Location: Pitt Stadium
  Pittsburgh, PA
- Game start: 1:30 p.m.
- Game attendance: 31,916
- Game weather: hot and humid
- Referee: Harry Roche

Scoring summary
| 2 | ORE | Len Scholl 36-yard field goal | ORE 3–0 |
| 2 | PITT | Bobby Dyer 1-yard run (Frank Clark kick) | PITT 7–3 |
| 3 | ORE | Tom Trovato 8-yard pass to Scott Cress (Scholl kick) | ORE 10–7 |
| 3 | ORE | Cress 6-yard run (Scholl kick) | ORE 17–7 |
| 4 | PITT | Dyer 9-yard pass to Mitch Zalnasky (Dyer pass to Eric Crabtree) | ORE 17–15 |

The Panthers opened the season against Coach Len Casanova's Oregon Ducks. Pitt led the all-time series 2–1, but Oregon had won the previous game played in Portland, OR. Pitt and Oregon have not met since on the gridiron.

In front of an opening day crowd of 31,916 at Pitt Stadium, Oregon evened the all-time series at 2–2 with a 17–15 victory. After a scoreless opening period, the Ducks offense stalled on the Pitt 23-yard line and Len Scholl booted a 36-yard field goal. Pitt answered with a 13-play, 80-yard drive capped by a 1-yard touchdown dive by Bob Dyer. Frank Clark kicked the extra point. Pitt led 7–3 at halftime. The Oregon offense scored twice in the third period. First, halfback Scott Cress caught an 8-yard pass from Tom Trovato to end an 11-play, 72-yard drive. Then, the Oregon defense forced a punt and drove 87 yards for their final touchdown. Cress ran around left end for 6-yards. Scholl converted both extra points. In the final quarter, the Panthers offense drove deep inside Oregon territory to the 25-yard line but lost the ball on a fumble. They got the ball back, drove to the 5-yard line and fumbled again. The next Pitt drive ended with a Bob Dyer 8-yard touchdown pass to Mitch Zalnasky. Fullback Barry McKnight's run cut the lead to 2 points. The Panthers managed to regain possession and move the ball to the Ducks 8-yard line, but Kenny Lucas threw an interception and Oregon was able to run out the clock.

The Pitt starting lineup for the game against Oregon was Mitch Zalnasky (left end), Tom Raymond (left tackle), Gabe Tamburino (left guard), Fred Hoaglin (center), Tom Qualey (right guard), Jim Jones (right tackle), Mike Rosborough (right end), Ken Lucas (quarterback), Eric Crabtree (left halfback), Bob Dyer (right halfback) and Barry McKnight (fullback). Substitutes appearing in the game for Pitt were Ed Assid, Bob Longo, Greg Keller, John Verkleeren, Phil Dahar, Howard Heit, John Schmidt, Al Keiser, Robert Trethaway, Robert Guzinsky, George Macko, Ray Radakovich, Joe Novogratz,Tom Crosby, David Merrill, Tom Mitrakos, Jock Beachler, John Boucek, Bob Bazylak, Joe Pohl, James Dodaro, Dale Stewart, Joe Curtin, Gerald Rife, Jim Flanigan, Mike Raklewicz, Andy McGraw and Frank Clark.

| Statistics | ORE | PITT |
|---|---|---|
| First downs | 16 | 16 |
| Plays–yards | 65–364 | 72–335 |
| Rushes–yards | 41–131 | 41–97 |
| Passing yards | 233 | 238 |
| Passing: comp–att–int | 14–24-1 | 13–31-2 |
| Turnovers | 3 | 4 |
| Time of possession | na | na |

| Team | Category | Player | Statistics |
|---|---|---|---|
| ORE | Passing | Tom Trovato | 7/12, 111 yards, 1 int |
| ORE | Rushing | Dick Winn | 9 carries, 39 yards |
| ORE | Receiving | Dennis Keller | 2 receptions, 77 yards |
| PITT | Passing | Kenny Lucas | 12/29, 229 yards, 1 int |
| PITT | Rushing | Eric Crabtree | 11 carries, 64 yards |
| PITT | Receiving | Eric Crabtree | 2 receptions, 91 yards |

=== Oklahoma ===
Week 2:OKLA at Pitt

| Team | 1 | 2 | 3 | 4 | Total |
|---|---|---|---|---|---|
| Oklahoma | 0 | 3 | 0 | 6 | 9 |
| • Pitt | 0 | 13 | 0 | 0 | 13 |

- Date: September 25, 1965
- Location: Pitt Stadium
  Pittsburgh, PA
- Game start: 1:30 p.m.
- Game attendance: 24,452
- Game weather: partly cloudy and cool
- Referee: David H. Buchanan

Scoring summary
| 2 | OKLA | Ron Shotts 24-yard field goal | OKLA 3–0 |
| 2 | PITT | Kenny Lucas 22-yard pass to Eric Crabtree (James Jones kick) | PITT 7–3 |
| 2 | PITT | Lucas 8-yard pass to Mitch Zalnasky (kick failed) | PITT 13–3 |
| 4 | OKLA | John Hammond 8-yard pass to Gordon Brown (pass failed) | PITT 13–9 |

On September 5, the Panthers hosted Coach Gomer Jones' Oklahoma Sooners for the third time in their series. Oklahoma had not lost to the Panthers and led the all-time series 4–0–1. Coach Jones had 20 returning lettermen on his roster, including All-American linebacker Carl McAdams.

Pitt managed to thrill the crowd of 24,452 fans by beating the Sooners 13–9. After a scoreless first quarter, in which the Panthers botched a field goal attempt, the Oklahoma offense moved to the Pitt 7-yard line and converted a Ron Shotts field goal. The Pitt offense answered with a 66-yard, 6-play drive, capped with a 22-yard touchdown pass from Kenny Lucas to Eric Crabtree. James Jones added the extra point. Then, with less than 2 minutes left in the half, a 14-yard punt gave Pitt possession on the Sooners 28-yard line. Lucas connected with end Mitch Zalnasky on three straight passes. The final 8-yard reception produced the touchdown. Jones' kick went wide left and Pitt lead 13–3. The Panthers squandered two scoring chances in the second half. Sooner guard Glanville Liggins blocked a 33-yard field goal attempt by Jones. Later Pitt drove to the 4-yard line and ended up turning the ball over on downs on the 9-yard line. Oklahoma started their 8-play, 91-yard touchdown drive with less than 6 minutes remaining. Quarterback John Hammond threw a 8-yard touchdown pass to Gordon Brown to cut the lead to 4 points. A fake placement attempt was intercepted by Pitt linebacker Tom Mitrakos. Oklahoma halfback Tom Pannell led all rushers with 82 yards. Barry McKnight's 43 yards led the Panthers. The crucial stat was Pitt punter Andy McGraw averaged 44 yards on 5 punts, while Sooner Tom Stidam averaged 29.9 on 7 kicks.

The Pitt starting lineup for the game against Oklahoma was Mitch Zalnasky (left end), Tom Raymond (left tackle), Gabe Tamburino (left guard), Fred Hoaglin (center), Tom Qualey (right guard), Jim Jones (right tackle), Mike Rosborough (right end), Ken Lucas (quarterback), Eric Crabtree (left halfback), Bob Dyer (right halfback) and Barry McKnight (fullback). Substitutes appearing in the game for Pitt were Ed Assid, Bob Longo, Greg Keller, Phil Dahar, George Hawryluk, Howard Heit, John Schmidt, Al Keiser, Robert Trethaway, Robert Guzinsky, Dave Drake, David Randour, Richard Genter, Joe Novogratz,Tom Crosby, Tom Mitrakos, Jock Beachler, John Boucek, Ed James, Bob Bazylak, Joe Pohl, James Dodaro, Dale Stewart, Joe Curtin, Gerald Rife, Jim Flanigan, Mike Raklewicz, Dewey Chester and Andy McGraw.

| Statistics | OKLA | PITT |
|---|---|---|
| First downs | 18 | 16 |
| Plays–yards | 67–322 | 62–241 |
| Rushes–yards | 49–177 | 39–93 |
| Passing yards | 145 | 148 |
| Passing: comp–att–int | 10–18 | 12–23 |
| Turnovers | 1 | 1 |
| Time of possession | na | na |

| Team | Category | Player | Statistics |
|---|---|---|---|
| OKLA | Passing | John Hammond | 10/18, 145 yards |
| OKLA | Rushing | Tommy Pannell | 15 carries, 82 yards |
| OKLA | Receiving | Tommy Pannell | 3 receptions, 65 yards |
| PITT | Passing | Kenny Lucas | 12/22, 148 yards |
| PITT | Rushing | Barry McKnight | 14 carries, 43 yards |
| PITT | Receiving | Eric Crabtree | 5 receptions, 72 yards |

=== at West Virginia ===
Week 3: Pitt at West Virginia

| Team | 1 | 2 | 3 | 4 | Total |
|---|---|---|---|---|---|
| Pitt | 0 | 20 | 14 | 14 | 48 |
| • West Virginia | 14 | 14 | 7 | 28 | 63 |

- Date: October 2, 1965
- Location: Mountaineer Field
  Morgantown, WV
- Game start: 1:30p.m.
- Game attendance: 35,000
- Game weather: cool
- Referee: H. G. Munder

Scoring summary
| 1 | WVU | Dick Leftridge 16-yard run (Chuck Kinder kick) | WVU 7–0 |
| 1 | WVU | Dick Rader 72-yard pass from Allen McCune (Kinder kick) | WVU 14–0 |
| 2 | WVU | Rader 14-yard pass from McCune (Kinder kick) | WVU 21–0 |
| 2 | PITT | Mike Rosborough 13-yard pass from Kenny Lucas (James Jones kick) | WVU 21–7 |
| 2 | PITT | Kenny Lucas 2-yard run (run failed) | WVU 21–13 |
| 2 | WVU | Garrett Ford 58-yard run (Kinder kick) | WVU 28–13 |
| 2 | PITT | Barry McKnight 2-yard run (Jones kick) | WVU 28–20 |
| 3 | PITT | Eric Crabtree 43-yard pass from Lucas (Lucas run) | TIED 28–28 |
| 3 | WVU | McCune 1-yard run (Kinder kick) | WVU 35–28 |
| 3 | PITT | Crabtree 71-yard run (pass failed) | WVU 35–34 |
| 4 | WVU | Jim Harris 17-yard pass from McCune (Kinder kick) | WVU 42–34 |
| 4 | PITT | Crabtree 92-yard kick-off (Lucas pass to Mitch Zalnasky) | TIED 42–42 |
| 4 | WVU | Rader 15-yard pass from McCune (Kinder kick) | WVU 49–42 |
| 4 | PITT | Bob Dyer 1-yard run (run failed) | WVU 49–48 |
| 4 | WVU | Ford 59-yard pass from McCune (Kinder kick) | WVU 56–48 |
| 4 | WVU | Ford 5-yard run (Kinder kick) | WVU 63–48 |

On October 2, the Panthers went to Morgantown, WV for the 58th Backyard Brawl. Pitt lead the all-time series 41–15–1, but the teams had split the past eight games. Sixth-year head coach Gene Corum returned 25 lettermen from the team that lost 14–0 at Pitt Stadium the previous season.

In front of a record sell-out crowd of 35,000 fans, West Virginia beat Pitt 63–48. In the highest scoring game of the series, the Pitt Panthers offense scored 7 touchdowns, kicked 2 extra points and converted 2-2 point conversions for 48 points, but the Pitt defense gave up 9 touchdowns and 9 extra points. Other records set were: highest losing score (48); total offense (624 yards WVU); passing yardage (320 yards WVU); touchdown passes (5 by Allen McCune WVU); rushing yardage in a quarter (133 yards by Garrett Ford). Eric Crabtree led Pitt with 3 touchdowns. He gained 75 yards rushing on 4 carries, had 3 pass receptions for 76 yards and returned a kick-off 92-yards to tie the game at 42. Halfbacks Dick Rader and Garrett Ford each scored three touchdowns for the Mountaineers.

The Pitt starting lineup for the game against West Virginia was Mitch Zalnasky (left end), Tom Raymond (left tackle), Gabe Tamburino (left guard), Fred Hoaglin (center), Tom Qualey (right guard), Jim Jones (right tackle), Mike Rosborough (right end), Kenny Lucas (quarterback), Bob Dyer (left halfback), Eric Crabtree (right halfback) and Barry McKnight (fullback). Substitutes appearing in the game for Pitt were Phil Dahar, Ed Assid, Bob Longo, John Verkleeren, Greg Keller, Al Keiser, Robert Guzinsky, Howard Heit, John Schmidt, Robert Trethaway, Dave Drake, David Randour, Brian Bubnis, Tom Crosby, James Dodaro, Mickey Depp, Jim Flanigan, Tom Mitrakos, Joe Novogratz, William Boucek, Ken Perry, Dale Stewart, Gerald Rife, Joseph Pohl, Joe Curtin, Bob Bazylak and Andy McGraw.

| Statistics | PITT | WVU |
|---|---|---|
| First downs | 18 | 27 |
| Plays–yards | na–447 | na–624 |
| Rushes–yards | na–195 | na–304 |
| Passing yards | 252 | 320 |
| Passing: comp–att–int | 16–27-1 | 18–25-1 |
| Turnovers | 1 | 1 |
| Time of possession | na | na |

| Team | Category | Player | Statistics |
|---|---|---|---|
| PITT | Passing | Kenny Lucas | 16/27, 252 yards, 1 int |
| PITT | Rushing | Barry McKnight | 17 carries, 61 yards |
| PITT | Receiving | Eric Crabtree | 3 receptions, 76 yards |
| WVU | Passing | Allen McCune | 18/25, 320 yards, 1 int |
| WVU | Rushing | Garrett Ford | 18 carries, 198 yards |
| WVU | Receiving | Dick Rader | 3 receptions, 101 yards |

=== at Duke ===
Week 4: Pitt at Duke

| Team | 1 | 2 | 3 | 4 | Total |
|---|---|---|---|---|---|
| Pitt | 7 | 0 | 0 | 6 | 13 |
| • Duke | 0 | 21 | 0 | 0 | 21 |

- Date: October 9, 1965
- Location: Duke Stadium
  Durham, NC
- Game start: noon
- Game attendance: 25,000
- Game weather: fair and mild

Scoring summary
| 1 | PITT | Eric Crabtree 8-yard run (Jim Jones kick) | PITT 7–0 |
| 2 | DUKE | Page Wilson 1-yard run (Mark Caldwell kick) | TIED 7–7 |
| 2 | DUKE | Chuck Drulis 17-yard pass from Scotty Glacken (Caldwell kick) | DUKE 14–7 |
| 2 | DUKE | Glacken 2-yard run (fCaldwell kick) | DUKE 21–7 |
| 4 | PITT | Mitch Zalnasky 1-yard pass from Kenny Lucas (pass failed) | DUKE 21–13 |

On October 9, the Panthers travelled to Durham, NC to play the unbeaten (3–0) Duke Blue Devils. The all-time series was tied at 6–6, but Pitt had won the previous three games. This was the National TV Game of the Week.

In front of 25,000 fans the Pitt Panthers lost to the Blue Devils 21–13. The Pitt offense scored a touchdown on an opening drive of 95-yards in 10 plays. Eric Crabtree ran the final 8 yards for the score. James Jones added the extra point and Pitt led 7–0 after less than 5 minutes. The second quarter was all Duke, as they tallied 3 touchdowns. Duke fullback Page Wilson ran 1-yard over left guard to cap a 9-play, 77-yard drive. Mike Caldwell tied the score with his first of three placements. An exchange of punts gave the Devils possession on the Pitt 31-yard line. Duke scored in three plays on a 17-yard touchdown pass from Scotty Glacken to Chuck Drulis. On second down after the kick-off Pitt quarterback Kenny Lucas fumbled and Duke recovered on the Panthers 39-yard line. Glacken scored on a 2-yard run around left end and Duke led 21–7 at halftime. Pitt engineered an 85-yard march early in the fourth quarter to cut the lead to 21–13. End Mitch Zalnasky caught a 1-yard pass from Lucas, but the 2-point conversion failed. Later in the period, Pitt gained possession and drove to a first down on the Duke 22-yard line. Barry McKnight fumbled the hand off and Duke recovered. The Blue Devils were then able to run out the clock.

The Pitt starting lineup for the game against Duke was Mitch Zalnasky (left end), Tom Raymond (left tackle), Gabe Tamburino (left guard), Fred Hoaglin (center), Dave Randour (right guard), John Schmidt (right tackle), Mike Rosborough (right end), Kenny Lucas (quarterback), Bob Dyer (left halfback), Eric Crabtree (right halfback) and Barry McKnight (fullback). The defensive lineup was Phil Dahar (left end), Al Keiser (left tackle), Dave Drake (middle guard), Bob Guzinsky (right tackle), Ed Assid (right end), Jim Flanigan (left linebacker), Tom Mitrakos (middle linebacker), Joe Novogratz (right linebacker), Dale Stewart (left cornerback), Gerald Rife (right cornerback) and Joe Pohl (safety). Substitutes appearing in the game for Pitt were Ed James, Andy McGraw, and James Jones.

| Statistics | PITT | DUKE |
|---|---|---|
| First downs | 18 | 18 |
| Plays–yards | 67–359 | 70–354 |
| Rushes–yards | 33–85 | 46–189 |
| Passing yards | 274 | 165 |
| Passing: comp–att–int | 21–34 | 18–24-2 |
| Turnovers | 2 | 2 |
| Time of possession | na | na |

| Team | Category | Player | Statistics |
|---|---|---|---|
| PITT | Passing | Kenny Lucas | 18/26, 233 yards |
| PITT | Rushing | Barry McKnight | 10 carries, 47 yards |
| PITT | Receiving | Eric Crabtree | 8 receptions, 132 yards |
| DUKE | Passing | Scotty Glacken | 16/24, 165 yards, 2 ints |
| DUKE | Rushing | Jay Calabrese | 15 carries, 67 yards |
| DUKE | Receiving | Chuck Drulis | 6 receptions, 61 yards |

=== at Navy ===
Week 5: Pitt at Navy

| Team | 1 | 2 | 3 | 4 | Total |
|---|---|---|---|---|---|
| Pitt | 0 | 0 | 0 | 0 | 0 |
| • Navy | 0 | 6 | 0 | 6 | 12 |

- Date: October 16, 1965
- Location: District of Columbia Stadium
  Washington, DC
- Game start: 1:30
- Game attendance: 24,183
- Game weather: cloudy
- Referee: Edward G. Myer (Temple)

Scoring summary
| 2 | NAVY | Al Roodhouse 1-yard run (kick failed) | NAVY 6–0 |
| 4 | NAVY | Steve Shrawder 21-yard pass from Bruce Bickel (pass failed) | NAVY 12–0 |

On October 16, the Panthers played their third road game in a row against the Midshipmen of the Naval Academy at RFK Stadium in Washington D. C. Pitt led the all-time series 7–4–2, but the Panthers had not beaten the Middies in the past three contests. First-year Navy Coach Bill Elias had 17 returning lettermen and his troops had a 2–1–1 record.

In front of 24,184 fans, including 4,100 Midshipmen classmates, Navy shut out the Panthers 12–0. Early in the second period, the Panthers drove to the Navy 27-yard line and Jim Jones missed a 37-yard field goal. Later in the period, the Navy defense forced the Panthers to punt from their own 26-yard line. Defensive end Ray Hill blocked the punt and Pitt fullback Barry McKnight downed it on the Pitt 2-yard line. Navy halfback Al Roodhouse scored on first down. A poor pass from center botched the extra point, but Navy led 6–0. In the third quarter, Pitt recovered a Navy fumble on the Midshipmen 21-yard line. On a pass to Eric Crabtree in the end zone Navy was called for pass interference. The ball was placed on the 1-yard line. Fullback McKnight was stopped twice, halfback Bob Dyer lost a yard and on fourth down quarterback Kenny Lucas fumbled. In the final period Pitt punter Andy McGraw pinned the Middies back on their own 4-yard line. Then backup quarterback Bruce Bickel directed a 96-yard touchdown drive that ended with his 21-yard touchdown pass to Steve Shrawder. The conversion try failed.

Pitt quarterback Kenny Lucas was sacked for losses totaling 87 yards, and he threw 2 interceptions. The Panthers lost 1 fumble. The Pitt defense intercepted 2 passes and recovered 3 Navy fumbles. They generated 191 yards of total offense but no points.

The Pitt starting lineup for the game against Navy was Mitch Zalnasky (left end), Tom Raymond (left tackle), Gabe Tamburino (left guard), Fred Hoaglin (center), Dave Randour (right guard), John Schmidt (right tackle), Mike Rosborough (right end), Kenny Lucas (quarterback), Bob Dyer (left halfback), Eric Crabtree (right halfback) and Barry McKnight (fullback). Substitutes appearing in the game for Pitt were Phil Dahar, Ed Assid, Bob Longo, John Verkleeren, Greg Keller, Al Keiser, Robert Guzinsky, James Jones, Tom Qualey, Robert Trethaway, Dave Drake, Brian Bubnis, Mickey Depp, Jim Flanigan, Tom Mitrakos, Joe Novogratz, William Boucek, Dale Stewart, Gerald Rife, Joseph Pohl, Joe Curtin, David Merrill, Richard Miale, Richard Genter, Frank Pecman and Andy McGraw.

| Statistics | PITT | NAVY |
|---|---|---|
| First downs | 14 | 11 |
| Plays–yards | 72–191 | 63–211 |
| Rushes–yards | 41–24 | 43–111 |
| Passing yards | 167 | 100 |
| Passing: comp–att–int | 15–31-2 | 8–20-2 |
| Turnovers | 3 | 5 |
| Time of possession | na | na |

| Team | Category | Player | Statistics |
|---|---|---|---|
| PITT | Passing | Kenny Lucas | 15/31, 167 yards, 2 ints |
| PITT | Rushing | Barry McKnight | 17 carries, 65 yards |
| PITT | Receiving | Eric Crabtree | 6 receptions, 89 yards |
| NAVY | Passing | John Cartwright | 5/16, 43 yards, 2 ints |
| NAVY | Rushing | Terrence Murray | 11 carries, 40 yards |
| NAVY | Receiving | Phil Norton | 4 receptions, 56 yards |

=== Miami (FL) ===
Week 6:Miami at Pitt

| Team | 1 | 2 | 3 | 4 | Total |
|---|---|---|---|---|---|
| Miami | 0 | 7 | 7 | 0 | 14 |
| • Pitt | 14 | 0 | 7 | 7 | 28 |

- Date: October 23, 1965
- Location: Pitt Stadium
  Pittsburgh, PA
- Game start: 1:30 p.m.
- Game attendance: 37,431
- Game weather: windy, cold, showers

Scoring summary
| 1 | PITT | Bob Dyer 23-yard pass from Kenny Lucas (kick failed) | PITT 6–0 |
| 1 | PITT | Barry McKnight 1-yard run (Mitch Zalnasky pass from Lucas) | PITT 14–0 |
| 2 | MIAMI | Russell Smith 1-yard run (Don Curtright kick ) | PITT 14–7 |
| 3 | PITT | Eric Crabtree 14-yard pass from Lucas (James Jones kick) | PITT 21–7 |
| 3 | MIAMI | Bill Schirmer 59-yard interception return (Curtright kick) | PITT 21–14 |
| 4 | PITT | Dyer 3-yard run (Jones kick) | PITT 28–14 |

On October 23, after a month on the road, the Panthers hosted the Miami Hurricanes for their Youth Day Game. Second-year coach Charlie Tate's squad had 24 returning lettermen, including All-American candidate defensive end Ed Weisacosky. The Hurricanes had a 2–3 record, and Pitt led the all-time series 5–4–1.

The Panthers treated the Youth Day crowd of 37,431 to a 28–14 victory over the Hurricanes. Pitt scored 2 touchdowns in the first quarter. Quarterback Kenny Lucas threw a 23-yard pass to Bob Dyer for the first score, and after an interception, fullback Barry McKnight capped the second scoring drive of 17 yards with a 1-yard plunge. A conversion pass from Lucas to Mitch Zalnasky put the Panthers ahead 14–0. Then, Pitt lost a fumble on their 23-yard line. The 9-play Miami drive ended with a Russell Smith dive into the end zone from the 1-yard line. Don Curtright booted the extra point to cut the lead to 7 points. Pitt took the second half kick-off and marched 80 yards in 13 plays with Lucas throwing a 23-yard pass to Eric Crabtree for the score. Jim Jones booted the placement. Late in the period Miami linebacker Ken Corbin bumped Lucas's arm as he was throwing and defensive end Bill Schirmer intercepted and ran 59-yards untouched for the score. Curtright was good on the placement to again cut the lead to 7. Pitt answered with a 14-play, 80-yard drive to seal the victory. Bob Dyer scored on a 3-yard run and Jones kicked the extra point. Pitt's 3 game losing streak was over.

The Pitt starting offensive lineup for the Miami game was Mike Rosborough (left end), Tom Raymond (left tackle), Gabe Tamburino (left guard), Fred Hoaglin (center), Tom Qualey (right guard), James Jones (right tackle), Mitch Zalnasky (right end), Kenny Lucas (quarterback), Bob Dyer (left halfback) Eric Crabtree (right halfback) and Barry McKnight (fullback). The defensive lineup was Ed Assid (left end), Bob Guzinsky (left tackle), Joe Novogratz (right linebacker), Tom Mitrakos (middle linebacker), Jim Flanigan (left linebacker), Dave Drake (middle guard), Al Keiser (right tackle), Phil Dahar (right end), Dale Stewart (left cornerback), Gerald Rife (right cornerback) and Joe Pohl (safety). Substitutes appearing in the game for Pitt were Mike Raklewicz, Dewey Chester, Ed James, Bob Longo, Andy McGraw, Mickey Depp, William Boucek, Marc Mallinger and Richard Genter.

| Statistics | MIAMI | PITT |
|---|---|---|
| First downs | 9 | 27 |
| Plays–yards | 45–168 | 89–439 |
| Rushes–yards | 21–48 | 74–231 |
| Passing yards | 120 | 208 |
| Passing: comp–att–int | 9–24-4 | 11–15-1 |
| Turnovers | 4 | 4 |
| Time of possession | na | na |

| Team | Category | Player | Statistics |
|---|---|---|---|
| MIAMI | Passing | Bill Miller | 9/24, 120 yards, 4 ints |
| MIAMI | Rushing | Russell Smith | 8 carries, 14 yards |
| MIAMI | Receiving | Jerry Daanen | 3 receptions, 49 yards |
| PITT | Passing | Kenny Lucas | 11/15, 208 yards, 1 int |
| PITT | Rushing | Eric Crabtree | 22 carries, 75 yards |
| PITT | Receiving | Mitch Zalnasky | 4 receptions, 58 yards |

=== at Syracuse ===
Week 7: Pitt at Syracuse

| Team | 1 | 2 | 3 | 4 | Total |
|---|---|---|---|---|---|
| Pitt | 0 | 0 | 0 | 13 | 13 |
| • Syracuse | 14 | 23 | 14 | 0 | 51 |

- Date: October 30, 1965
- Location: Shea Stadium
  New York, NY
- Game start: 1:30p.m.
- Game attendance: 24,590
- Game weather: sunny and warm

Scoring summary
| 1 | SYR | Mike Koski 70-yard run (Joe Dziekonski kick ) | SYR 7–0 |
| 1 | SYR | Ed Mantie 32-yard interception (Dziekonski kick) | SYR 14–0 |
| 2 | SYR | Floyd Little 15-yard run ( Dziekonski kick ) | SYR 21–0 |
| 2 | SYR | Little 95-yard punt return L (Dziekonski kick) | SYR 28–0 |
| 2 | SYR | Dziekonski 21-yard field goal | SYR 31–0 |
| 2 | SYR | Terry Roe 33-yard interception return (kick failed) | SYR 37–0 |
| 3 | SYR | Little 1-yard run (Dziekonski kick) | SYR 44–0 |
| 3 | SYR | Little 23-yard run (Dziekonski kick) | SYR 51–0 |
| 4 | PITT | Eric Crabtree 48-yard pass from Kenny Lucas (James Jones kick) | SYR 51–7 |
| 4 | PITT | Barry McKnight 1-yard run (kick failed) | SYR 51–13 |

On October 30, Pitt and Syracuse played in Flushing, New York at Shea Stadium. This was the twenty-first meeting and Pitt led the series 11–7–2. However, the Orangemen had won 5 of the past eight meetings. Coach Ben Schwartzwalder's team had 20 lettermen and two All-Americans (halfback Floyd Little and center Pat Killorin). Their fullback was sophomore Larry Csonka.

In front of a sparse crowd of 24,950 fans, Pitt absorbed its worst loss in this series 51–13. Syracuse only needed two and a half quarters to amass 51 points. Pitt scored its 13 points against the second and third string Syracuse defense. Floyd Little scored four touchdowns and gained 248 yards. Pitt received the opening kick-off, and were forced to punt. Four plays later Mike Koski raced 70 yards for the first touchdown. Joe Dziekonski converted the first of his six placements for a 7–0 lead. Then Pitt halfback Bob Dyer fumbled on second down into the arms of Ed Mantie, who raced 32 yards untouched for touchdown number two, and Pitt was behind 14–0 in the first seven minutes. Little starred in the second and third quarters. He raced 15 yards around left end for his first touchdown and followed that with a 95-yard punt return. Dziekonski booted a 21-yard field goal and Terrell Roe closed the first half scoring with a 33-yard interception return. Syracuse 37–Pitt 0. In the third quarter, Little scored on a 1-yard and 23-yard run to up the score to 51–0. In the final period, Pitt managed a 48-yard scoring toss from Kenny Lucas to Eric Crabtree and a 1-yard plunge by Barry McKnight. Jim Jones was good on the first conversion.

The Pitt starting offensive lineup for the Syracuse game was Mike Rosborough (left end), Tom Raymond (left tackle), Gabe Tamburino (left guard), Fred Hoaglin (center), Tom Qualey (right guard), James Jones (right tackle), Mitch Zalnasky (right end), Kenny Lucas (quarterback), Bob Dyer (left halfback) Eric Crabtree (right halfback) and Barry McKnight (fullback). The defensive lineup was Ed Assid (left end), Bob Guzinsky (left tackle), Joe Novogratz (right linebacker), Tom Mitrakos (middle linebacker), Jim Flanigan (left linebacker), Dave Drake (middle guard), Al Keiser (right tackle), Phil Dahar (right end), Dale Stewart (left cornerback), Gerald Rife (right cornerback) and Ken Perry (safety). Substitutes appearing in the game for Pitt were Frank Pecman, Robert Trethaway, George Macko, Brian Bubnis, Ray Radakovich, David Merrill, Joe Curtin, Bob Bazylak, Carmen Sporio, Mike Raklewicz, Dewey Chester, Ed James, Bob Longo, Andy McGraw, Richard Miale, Mickey Depp, William Boucek, Marc Mallinger, Howard Heit and Richard Genter.

| Statistics | PITT | SYR |
|---|---|---|
| First downs | 17 | 20 |
| Plays–yards | na–228 | na–373 |
| Rushes–yards | na–52 | na–308 |
| Passing yards | 176 | 65 |
| Passing: comp–att–int | 15–34-3 | 5–13-1 |
| Turnovers | 6 | 3 |
| Time of possession | na | na |

| Team | Category | Player | Statistics |
|---|---|---|---|
| PITT | Passing | Kenny Lucas | 15/34, 176 yards, 3 ints |
| PITT | Rushing | Eric Crabtree | 14 carries, 35 yards |
| PITT | Receiving | Mike Rosborough | 7 receptions, 59 yards |
| SYR | Passing | Rick Cassata | 3/6, 41 yards |
| SYR | Rushing | Floyd Little | 13 carries, 97 yards |
| SYR | Receiving | Mike Koski | 1 reception, 23 yards |

=== Notre Dame ===
Week 8:Notre Dame at Pitt

| Team | 1 | 2 | 3 | 4 | Total |
|---|---|---|---|---|---|
| • Notre Dame | 21 | 14 | 20 | 14 | 69 |
| Pitt | 0 | 6 | 0 | 7 | 13 |

- Date: November 6, 1965
- Location: Pitt Stadium
  Pittsburgh, PA
- Game start: 1:30 p.m.
- Game attendance: 57,169
- Game weather: cloudy, warm
- Referee: Howard Wirtz

Scoring summary
| 1 | ND | Larry Conjar 42-yard run (Ken Ivan kick ) | ND 7–0 |
| 1 | ND | Bill Wolski 7-yard run (Ivan kick) | ND 14–0 |
| 1 | ND | Wolski 5-yard run (Ivan kick ) | ND 21–0 |
| 2 | ND | Wolski 5-yard run (Ivan kick) | ND 28–0 |
| 2 | ND | Wolski 5-yard run (Ivan kick) | ND 35–0 |
| 2 | PITT | Bobby Dyer 21-yard pass from Kenny Lucas (pass failed) | ND 35–6 |
| 3 | ND | Wolski 1-yard run (Ivan kick) | ND 42–6 |
| 3 | ND | Don Gmitter 44-yard pass from Bill Zloch (kick failed) | ND 48–6 |
| 3 | ND | Paul May 5-yard run (Ivan kick) | ND 55–6 |
| 4 | ND | Rocky Bleier 2-yard run (JIvan kick) | ND 62–6 |
| 4 | ND | Dennis Conway 2-yard run (Ivan kick) | ND 69–6 |
| 4 | PITT | Mitch Zalnasky 5-yard pass from Ed James (James Jones kick) | ND 69–13 |

On November 6, Pitt hosted Notre Dame for Homecoming. Notre Dame led the all-time series 19–11–1 and had won 3 of the past 4 games. Coach Ara Parseghian's squad was 5–1 and ranked #4 by the AP. All-America candidates Dick Arrington (guard), Nick Rassas (defensive back), Tom Regner (guard), Bill Wolski (halfback) and Jim Lynch (linebacker) highlighted the roster.

In front of a capacity crowd of 57,169 fans, the Panthers were beaten by the Irish 69–13. Notre Dame led 35–0 in the first half, on the strength of Bill Wolski's 4 touchdowns, before the Panthers were able to score. Late in the second period Kenny Lucas connected on a 21-yard pass to Bob Dyer, but the extra point was blocked, and Pitt trailed 35–6 at halftime. The second half mimicked the first as the Irish substitutes scored another 5 touchdowns. (Future Steeler running back Rocky Bleier scored on a 2-yard run). Against Notre Dame's third stringers, with 12 seconds left on the clock, Panther end Mitch Zalnasky caught a touchdown pass from Ed James and Jim Jones converted to complete the scoring. On a positive note, Pitt quarterbacks Kenny Lucas and Ed James completed 20 of 37 passes for 242 yards with no interceptions. Bill Wolski set a Notre Dame record with 5 touchdowns. Ken Ivan set a record by converting on 9 of 10 extra points.

The Pitt starting offensive lineup for the Notre Dame game was Mike Rosborough (left end), Tom Raymond (left tackle), Richard Miale (left guard), Fred Hoaglin (center), Tom Qualey (right guard), James Jones (right tackle), Mitch Zalnasky (right end), Kenny Lucas (quarterback), Bob Dyer (left halfback) Eric Crabtree (right halfback) and Barry McKnight (fullback). The defensive lineup was Ed Assid (left end), Bob Guzinsky (left tackle), Joe Novogratz (right linebacker), William Boucek (middle linebacker), Jim Flanigan (left linebacker), Dave Drake (middle guard), Al Keiser (right tackle), Phil Dahar (right end), Dale Stewart (left cornerback), Mickey Depp (right cornerback) and Joe Pohl (safety). Substitutes appearing in the game for Pitt were Bob Longo, Ronald Simantel John Schmidt, Frank Pecman, Tom Crosby, David Merrill, Tom Mitrakos, Richard Genter, Jock Beachler, David Randour, Robert Trethaway, David Raudman, Greg Keller, John Verkleeren, Dewey Chester, James Dodaro, Joe Curtin, Gerald Rife, Ed James, Mike Raklewicz and Ken Perry.

| Statistics | ND | PITT |
|---|---|---|
| First downs | 26 | 15 |
| Plays–yards | 81–547 | 62–282 |
| Rushes–yards | 74–363 | 25–40 |
| Passing yards | 184 | 242 |
| Passing: comp–att–int | 6–7 | 20–37-2 |
| Turnovers | 0 | 4 |
| Time of possession | na | na |

| Team | Category | Player | Statistics |
|---|---|---|---|
| ND | Passing | Bill Zloch | 3/4, 129 yards |
| ND | Rushing | Nick Eddy | 11 carries, 88 yards |
| ND | Receiving | Don Gmitter | 2 receptions, 73 yards |
| PITT | Passing | Kenny Lucas | 14/29, 155 yards, 2 ints |
| PITT | Rushing | Eric Crabtree | 4 carries, 27 yards |
| PITT | Receiving | Eric Crabtree | 6 receptions, 50 yards |

=== at Southern Cal ===
Week 9: Pitt at USC

| Team | 1 | 2 | 3 | 4 | Total |
|---|---|---|---|---|---|
| Pitt | 0 | 0 | 0 | 0 | 0 |
| • USC | 7 | 7 | 7 | 7 | 28 |

- Date: November 13, 1965
- Location: Los Angeles Memorial Coliseum
  Los Angeles, CA
- Game start: 1:30p.m.
- Game attendance: 40,339
- Game weather: cloudy
- Referee: Lawrence Ellis

Scoring summary
| 1 | USC | Mike Garrett 1-yard run (Tim Rossovich kick ) | USC 7–0 |
| 2 | USC | Garrett 7-yard run (Rossovich kick ) | USC 14–0 |
| 3 | USC | Garrett 4-yard run (Rossovich kick ) | USC 21–0 |
| 4 | USC | Don McCall 3-yard run (Rossovich kick) | USC 28–0 |

Pitt's final road game was in Los Angeles to play the USC Trojans. The all-time series was tied at 4–4. Coach John McKay's squad was 5–1–1 and ranked #6 by the AP. All-American halfback Mike Garrett led the nation in rushing with 962 yards. After the two blowout losses, Coach Michelosen tweaked the defensive lineup: end Mitch Zalnasky, tackle Tom Raymond and guard Tom Qualey played both offense and defense; center Jock Beachler was moved to defense; halfback Gerald Rife replaced Dale Stewart at defensive back.

In front of 40,339 fans at the Los Angeles Coliseum, the Trojans beat the Panthers 28–0. Heisman Trophy winner Mike Garrett scored the first three touchdowns and his replacement Mickey McCall scored the last one. Tim Rossovich converted all four extra points. USC opened the game with a 16-play, 78-yard drive capped by Garrett's 1-yard plunge. In the second quarter, Pitt quarterback Kenny Lucas fumbled while being sacked, and Adrian Young recovered for the Trojans on the Pitt 7-yard line. Garrett scored on first down. In the third period, Phil Lee intercepted a Lucas pass on the USC 34-yard line. On the tenth play Garrett scored from 4 yards out. In the final quarter, the Panthers drove to the Trojans' 12-yard line, but Mike Hunter intercepted, and the USC offense travelled 88 yards in 13 plays for their final score. Pitt's final drive ended on the USC 9-yard line.

The Pitt starting offensive lineup for the USC game was Mike Rosborough (left end), Tom Raymond (left tackle), Richard Miale (left guard), Fred Hoaglin (center), Tom Qualey (right guard), James Jones (right tackle), Mitch Zalnasky (right end), Kenny Lucas (quarterback), Bob Dyer (left halfback) Eric Crabtree (right halfback) and Barry McKnight (fullback). The defensive lineup was Ed Assid (left end), Bob Guzinsky (left tackle), Joe Novogratz (right linebacker), William Boucek (middle linebacker), Jim Flanigan (left linebacker), Dave Drake (middle guard), Al Keiser (right tackle), Phil Dahar (right end), Gerald Rife (left cornerback), Mickey Depp (right cornerback) and Joe Pohl (safety). Substitutes appearing in the game for Pitt were Bob Longo, Mike Raklewicz and Dewey Chester.

| Statistics | PITT | USC |
|---|---|---|
| First downs | 15 | 24 |
| Plays–yards | 45–193 | 73–326 |
| Rushes–yards | 13–74 | 63–287 |
| Passing yards | 119 | 121 |
| Passing: comp–att–int | 13–32–4 | 10–16–1 |
| Turnovers | 5 | 2 |
| Time of possession | na | na |

| Team | Category | Player | Statistics |
|---|---|---|---|
| PITT | Passing | Kenny Lucas | 13/31, 119 yards, 4 ints |
| PITT | Rushing | Robert Dyer | 6 carries, 32 yards |
| PITT | Receiving | Bob Longo | 4 receptions, 50 yards |
| USC | Passing | Troy Winslow | 9/14, 88 yards, 1 int |
| USC | Rushing | Mike Garrett | 26 carries, 156 yards |
| USC | Receiving | Mickey Upton | 3 receptions, 53 yards |

=== Penn State ===
Week 10:Penn State at Pitt

| Team | 1 | 2 | 3 | 4 | Total |
|---|---|---|---|---|---|
| Penn State | 0 | 0 | 7 | 20 | 27 |
| • Pitt | 12 | 8 | 7 | 3 | 30 |

- Date: November 20, 1965
- Location: Pitt Stadium
  Pittsburgh, PA
- Game start: 1:30 p.m.
- Game attendance: 35,596
- Game weather: cloudy and cool
- Referee: E. L. Meringer

Scoring summary
| 1 | PITT | Dewey Chester 1-yard run (kick failed ) | PITT 6–0 |
| 1 | PITT | Bob Longo 41-yard pass from Kenny Lucas (pass failed) | PITT 12–0 |
| 2 | PITT | Barry McKnight 1-yard run (Longo pass from Lucas) | PITT 20–0 |
| 3 | PSU | Jack White 3-yard run (Tom Sherman kick ) | PITT 20–7 |
| 3 | PITT | McKnight 7-yard run (Frank Clark kick ) | PITT 27–7 |
| 4 | PSU | Dave McNaughton 3-yard run (Sherman kick ) | PITT 27–14 |
| 4 | PSU | Don Kunit 3-yard run (Sherman kick ) | USC 27–21 |
| 4 | PSU | Don Kunit 2-yard run (Rkick failed ) | TIED 27–27 |
| 4 | PITT | Frank Clark 18-yard field goal Score=PITT 30–27 | {{{Score}}} |

On November 20, the Panthers hosted the Penn State Nittany Lions for their annual game. Pitt led the all-time series 34–27–3, but had lost 5 of the previous 7 contests. Twenty senior Panthers suited up for their final college game: Eric Crabtree, Carmen Sporio, Jim Dadaro, Phil Dahar, Jock Beachler, Kenny Lucas, Fred Hoaglin, Gabe Tamburino, Mitch Zalnasky, Tom Raymond, Joe Novogratz, Jimmy Jones, Ron Simantel, Ed Assid, Barry McKnight, George Macko, Bob Guzinsky, Andy McGraw, Dale Stewart and Ken Perry.

In front of 35,567 fans, the Pitt Panthers closed their season with a surprising 30–27 victory over Penn State. Pitt scored three touchdowns in the first half and led 20–0 at halftime. Lion halfback, Don Kunit's three fumbles led to Pitt scores. Pitt kicked off and, after State made a first down, Kunit fumbled on first down at the Lion 36-yard line. Pitt defensive back Tippy Pohl recovered. Pitt scored in 10 plays when Dewey Chester plunged over from 1-yard out on fourth down. Jim Jones missed the point after. Pitt kicked off and Kunit fumbled on second down. Pitt tackle Robert Trethaway recovered on the Pitt 47-yard line. Kenny Lucas passed 41-yards to Bob Longo for the touchdown, but his pass for the two-point conversion was incomplete. Kunit's next fumble led to a missed field goal try by Frank Clark from the 14-yard line. The Pitt offense regained possession and capped an 87-yard drive with a 1-yard run from Barry McKnight. Kenny Lucas passed to Bob Longo for the 2-point conversion. After intermission, the Penn State offense went 48 yards in 10 plays to cut the lead to 20–7. Pitt answered with a 67-yard drive which ended with McKnight running the final 7 yards for the score. Clark's point after was good and Pitt led 27–7 at the end of 3 quarters. Penn State proceeded to score three touchdowns on drives of 59, 68 and 88 yards. Dave McNaughton scored the first and Kunit scored the next two. Tom Sherman converted the first two extra points. He missed the third, so the score remained tied with 1:06 left on the clock. Eric Crabtree returned the kick-off 31 yards to the Pitt 40-yard line with 55 seconds remaining. Lucas proceeded to complete 4 of 5 passes (with a 15-yard gain on a Bobby Dyer run mixed in) to move the ball to the 2-yard line with 9 seconds left. Lucas tried to rollout, but he was forced out of bounds on the 1-yard line with 3 seconds left. Then Frank Clark booted the only field goal of his Pitt career to break the Penn State string of 26 consecutive winning seasons.

The Pitt starting offensive lineup for the Penn State game was Bob Longo (left end), Tom Raymond (left tackle), Richard Miale (left guard), Fred Hoaglin (center), Tom Qualey (right guard), James Jones (right tackle), Mitch Zalnasky (right end), Kenny Lucas (quarterback), Bob Dyer (left halfback) Eric Crabtree (right halfback) and Barry McKnight (fullback). The defensive lineup was Ed Assid (left end), Bob Guzinsky (left tackle), Joe Novogratz (right linebacker), William Boucek (middle linebacker), Jim Flanigan (left linebacker), Dave Drake (middle guard), Robert Trethaway (right tackle), Phil Dahar (right end), Gerald Rife (left cornerback), Mickey Depp (right cornerback) and Joe Pohl (safety). Substitutes appearing in the game for Pitt were Greg Keller, Howard Heit, Al Keiser, Brian Bubnis, Jock Beachler, Dale Stewart, Andy McGraw, Frank Clark and Dewey Chester.

| Statistics | PSU | PITT |
|---|---|---|
| First downs | 17 | 24 |
| Plays–yards | 66–320 | 79–383 |
| Rushes–yards | 47–198 | 54–142 |
| Passing yards | 122 | 241 |
| Passing: comp–att–int | 9–19 | 19–25–1 |
| Turnovers | 4 | 1 |
| Time of possession | na | na |

| Team | Category | Player | Statistics |
|---|---|---|---|
| PSU | Passing | Jack White | 9/18, 122 yards |
| PSU | Rushing | Dave McNaughton | 21 carries, 83 yards |
| PSU | Receiving | Jack Curry | 3 receptions, 37 yards |
| PITT | Passing | Kenny Lucas | 18/24, 228 yards, 1 int |
| PITT | Rushing | Barry McKnight | 23 carries, 81 yards |
| PITT | Receiving | Bob Longo | 6 receptions, 92 yards |

== Postseason ==
Halfback Eric Crabtree and linebacker Joe Novogratz were selected to play in both the East-West Shrine Game (December 31, 1965 in San Francisco, CA) and the Hula Bowl (January 8, 1966 in Honolulu, HI). Quarterback Kenny Lucas and center Fred Hoaglin were selected to play in the North-South Shrine Game (December 25, 1965 in Miami, FL)

On November 24, 1965, Coach John Michelosen was relieved of his coaching duties, and offered a position on the faculty. His eleven-year record was 56–49–7.

== Coaching staff ==
1965 Pittsburgh Panthers football staff
| Coaching staff: John Michelosen – head coach; Carl DePasqua –defensive backs coach; John Stiegman–defensive line coach; Walter Cummins – center coach; Lou Cecconi – offensive backfield coach; Robert Rosborough – end coach; Richard Mills – tackle coach; Steve Petro – freshman coach | Support staff: Frank Carver– athletic director; J. Clyde Barton – assistant athletic director; Walter Cummins – assistant athletic director; Carroll Cook– athletic publicity director; Dr. W. K. Smith – team doctor; Dr. Chester Phillips – team doctor; Dr.Richard Deitrick – team doctor; Dr. Edward McCain – team doctor; Dr. Andrew Wissinger - team doctor; Howard Waite – trainer; Walter O. Willoughby – trainer; Donald Graham - trainer; Ellis Weinberger– student manager |

== Roster ==
1965 Pittsburgh Panthers football roster
| Player | Position | Games | Weight | Height | Class | Prep School | Hometown |
|---|---|---|---|---|---|---|---|
| James Alcorn | quarterback | 0 | 185 | 6 ft | junior | Penn Hills H. S. | Verona, PA |
| Wayne Andersen | guard | 0 | 200 | 6 ft | junior | William Penn H. S. | York, PA |
| Ed Assid* | halfback | 10 | 195 | 6 ft 3 in | senior | New Castle H. S. | New Castle, PA |
| Robert Bazylak* | quarterback | 4 | 175 | 5 ft 11 in | sophomore | McKeesport H. S. | McKeesport, PA |
| Jock Beachler* | center | 4 | 185 | 5 ft 11 in | senior | Mt. Lebanon H. S. | Mt. Lebanon, PA |
| Andrew Beamon | center | 0 | 185 | 6 ft | sophomore | McKeesport H. S. | Port Vue, PA |
| William Boucek* | center | 10 | 210 | 6 ft 1 in | sophomore | North Catholic/ Manlius H. S. | Pittsburgh, PA |
| Brian Bubnis | guard | 4 | 235 | 6 ft | junior | Mt. Carmel H. S. | Mt. Carmel, PA |
| Dewey Chester* | halfback | 3 | 205 | 6 ft 1 in | junior | East H. S. | Cleveland, OH |
| Frank Clark | halfback | 2 | 170 | 5 ft 7 in | junior | Mohawk H. S. | Bessemer, PA |
| Mike Coleman | guard | 0 | 220 | 6 ft | sophomore | Our Lady of Sorrows H. S. | Farmington, MI |
| Eric Crabtree* | halfback | 10 | 180 | 5 ft 11in | senior | Monessen H. S. | Monessen, PA |
| Tom Crosby* | guard | 5 | 205 | 5 ft 10 in | sophomore | Glassport H. S. | Glassport, PA |
| Joseph Curtin* | halfback | 9 | 188 | 5 ft 11 in | sophomore | Brentwood H. S. | Brentwood, PA |
| Phil Dahar* | end | 10 | 209 | 6 ft 2 in | senior | Dillonvale H. S. | Dillonvale, OH |
| Mickey Depp* | halfback | 5 | 190 | 6 ft 1 in | sophomore | Punxsutawney H. S. | Punxsutawney, PA |
| James Dodaro* | halfback | 5 | 200 | 6 ft 2 in | senior | North Catholic H. S. | Blawnox, PA |
| Dave Drake* | guard | 9 | 215 | 6 ft 2 in | sophomore | Ambridge H. S. | Ambridge, PA |
| Robert Dyer* | halfback | 10 | 175 | 5 ft 9 in | junior | Central Bucks H. S. | Doylestown, PA |
| Mike Elliott | halfback | 0 | 190 | 5 ft 11 in | sophomore | Mesa H. S. | Ymesa, AZ |
| James Elmore | halfback | 0 | 180 | 6 ft | junior | Brentwood H. S. | Brentwood, PA |
| James Flanagan* | fullback | 10 | 230 | 6 ft 3 in | sophomore | West-Mifflin North | West Mifflin, PA |
| Richard Genter* | center | 3 | 200 | 6 ft 3 in | sophomore | North Hills H. S. | North Hills, PA |
| Bob Guzinsky* | tackle | 10 | 224 | 6 ft 2 in | senior | Mahonoy, Manlius H. S. | Mahonoy City, PA |
| George Hawryluk | end | 1 | 195 | 6 ft 2 in | sophomore | Brentwood H. S. | Pittsburgh, PA |
| Howard Heit | tackle | 6 | 228 | 6 ft 3 in | junior | Kingston H. S. | Kingston, PA |
| Toby Hensgen | center | 0 | 220 | 6 ft 1 in | sophomore | Highland Park H. S. | Highland Park, IL |
| Fred Hoaglin* | center | 10 | 225 | 6 ft 4 in | senior | East Palestine H. S. | East Palestine, OH |
| Edward James | quarterback | 2 | 190 | 6 ft 1 in | junior | New Castle H. S. | New Castle, PA |
| James Jones* | tackle | 10 | 265 | 6 ft 1 in | senior | Easton H. S. | Easton, PA |
| Joseph Jones | fullback | 0 | 200 | 5 ft 11 in | sophomore | HarrisonH. S. | Harrison, NJ |
| Al Keiser* | tackle | 10 | 225 | 6 ft 2 in | junior | Bay H. S. | Bay Village, OH |
| Greg Keller* | end | 9 | 210 | 6 ft 3 in | sophomore | St. Ignatius H. S. | Cleveland, OH |
| Paul Killian | halfback | 0 | 194 | 6 ft | sophomore | TarentumH. S. | Tarentum, PA |
| Jay Knafelc | end | 0 | 220 | 6 ft 3 in | sophomore | Ambridge H. S. | Ambridge, PA |
| Dev Lemster | punter | 0 | 150 | 5 ft 10 in | sophomore | Mt. Lebanon H. S. | Mt. Lebanon, PA |
| Robert Longo* | end | 10 | 215 | 6 ft 4 in | sophomore | Baldwin H. S. | Baldwin, PA |
| Kenny Lucas* | quarterback | 10 | 180 | 6 ft | senior | Glassport H. S. | Glassport, PA |
| George Macko* | tackle | 2 | 235 | 6 ft 1 in | senior | Greensburg, Manlius H. S. | Greensburg, PA |
| Marc Mallinger | end | 1 | 201 | 6 ft 1 in | sophomore | Westmoor H. S. | Daly City, CA |
| Andy McGraw* | punter | 10 | 195 | 5 ft 11 in | senior | South Fayette H. S. | Cuddy, PA |
| Barry McKnight* | fullback | 10 | 204 | 6 ft | senior | Indiana H. S. | Indiana, PA |
| David Merrill | guard | 4 | 215 | 6 ft | junior | Allegheny H. S. | Cumberland, MD |
| Mark Mervos | tackle | 0 | 230 | 6 ft 2 in | sophomore | South H. S. | Pittsburgh, PA |
| Richard Miale* | end | 4 | 218 | 6 ft 2 in | sophomore | Monongahela H. S. | Monongahela, PA |
| Tom Mitrakos* | center | 9 | 225 | 6 ft 4 in | sophomore | Penn Hills H. S. | Penn Hills, PA |
| Joe Novogratz* | guard | 10 | 225 | 6 ft 2 in | senior | Northampton, Bordentown H. S. | Northampton, PA |
| Frank Pecman* | tackle | 3 | 230 | 6 ft 3 in | sophomore | Central Catholic H. S. | JPittsburgh, PA |
| Ken Perry* | fullback | 3 | 185 | 5 ft 11 in | senior | Monongahela H. S. | Finleyville, PA |
| Joseph Pohl* | quarterback | 9 | 195 | 6 ft 1 in | junior | Erie East H. S. | Erie, PA |
| Thomas Qualey* | guard | 10 | 215 | 6 ft | junior | Braddock H. S. | Braddock, PA |
| Raymond Radakovich | guard | 2 | 215 | 6 ft 1 in | sophomore | West Mifflin North H. S. | West Mifflin, PA |
| Mike Raklewicz* | fullback | 4 | 205 | 6 ft | sophomore | Kingston H. S. | Harvey's Lake, PA |
| David Randour* | fullback | 5 | 206 | 5 ft 10 in | junior | Fort Cherry H. S. | McDonald, PA |
| David Raudman | tackle | 1 | 230 | 6 ft 3 in | sophomore | CarthageH. S. | Carthage, MO |
| Tom Raymond* | tackle | 10 | 240 | 6 ft 1 in | senior | Beth-Center H. S. | Low Hill, PA |
| Gerald Rife* | halfback | 9 | 203 | 6 ft 2 in | sophomore | McDowell H. S. | Erie, PA |
| Gary Rohen | halfback | 0 | 170 | 5 ft 8 in | sophomore | Jamaica H. S. | Flushing, NY |
| Michael Rosborough* | end | 8 | 200 | 6 ft 3 in | junior | Donora H. S. | Donora, PA |
| John Schmidt* | tackle | 7 | 228 | 6 ft 2 in | junior | Baldwin H. S. | Whitehall, PA |
| Ronald Simantel* | end | 1 | 240 | 6 ft 8 in | senior | New Kensington H. S. | New Kensington, PA |
| Carmen Sporio* | fullback | 1 | 200 | 6 ft | senior | Thomas Jefferson H. S. | Clairton, PA |
| Dale Stewart* | halfback | 10 | 205 | 6 ft 1 in | senior | Hazelton, Manlius H. S. | Hazelton, PA |
| Gabe Tamburino* | center | 7 | 230 | 6 ft 3 in | senior | Ursuline H. S. | Youngstown, OH |
| Robert Taylor | center | 1 | 205 | 6 ft 2 in | junior | Ambridge H. S. | Ambridge, PA |
| Robert Trethaway* | tackle | 10 | 225 | 6 ft 4 in | junior | Meyers H. S. | Wilkes-Barre, PA |
| John Verkleeren* | end | 7 | 205 | 6 ft 3 in | junior | Charleroi H. S. | Charleroi, PA |
| Kurt Wentzel | end | 0 | 215 | 6 ft 2 in | junior | Mt. Lebanon, Manlius H. S. | Mt. Lebanon, PA |
| Mitchell Zalnasky* | end | 10 | 200 | 6 ft 2 in | senior | West Allegheny H. S. | Tyre, PA |
* Letterman

== Individual scoring summary ==
1965 Pittsburgh Panthers scoring summary
| Player | Touchdowns | Extra points | Two pointers | Field goals | Safety | Points |
|---|---|---|---|---|---|---|
| Eric Crabtree | 7 | 0 | 1 | 0 | 0 | 44 |
| Barry McKnight | 5 | 0 | 0 | 0 | 0 | 30 |
| Bob Dyer | 5 | 0 | 0 | 0 | 0 | 30 |
| Mitch Zalnasky | 4 | 0 | 2 | 0 | 0 | 28 |
| Kenny Lucas | 1 | 0 | 1 | 0 | 0 | 8 |
| James Jones | 0 | 8 | 0 | 0 | 0 | 8 |
| Bob Longo | 1 | 0 | 1 | 0 | 0 | 6 |
| Mike Rosborough | 1 | 0 | 0 | 0 | 0 | 6 |
| Dewey Chester | 1 | 0 | 0 | 0 | 0 | 6 |
| Frank Clark | 0 | 2 | 0 | 1 | 0 | 5 |
| Totals | 25 | 10 | 5 | 1 | 0 | 173 |

== Statistical leaders ==
Pittsburgh's individual statistical leaders for the 1965 season include those listed below.

=== Rushing ===
| Player | Attempts | Net yards | Yards per attempt | Touchdowns |
|---|---|---|---|---|
| Barry McKnight | 124 | 406 | 3.3 | 5 |
| Eric Crabtree | 84 | 372 | 3.5 | 3 |
| Bob Dyer | 75 | 307 | 4.1 | 3 |

=== Passing ===
| Player | Attempts | Completions | Interceptions | Comp % | Yards | Yds/Comp | TD |
|---|---|---|---|---|---|---|---|
| Ken Lucas | 268 | 144 | 15 | 53.7 | 1921 | 13.3 | 10 |
| Bob Dyer | 4 | 1 | 1 | 25.0 | 9 | 9.0 | 1 |

=== Receiving ===
| Player | Receptions | Yards | Yds/Recp | TD |
|---|---|---|---|---|
| Eric Crabtree | 45 | 724 | 16.1 | 4 |
| Mike Rosborough | 32 | 364 | 11.4 | 1 |
| Mitch Zalnasky | 32 | 340 | 10.6 | 4 |
| Bob Longo | 20 | 341 | 17.1 | 1 |

=== Kickoff returns ===
| Player | Returns | Yards | Yds/Return | TD |
|---|---|---|---|---|
| Eric Crabtree | 25 | 636 | 25.4 | 0 |
| Bob Dyer | 13 | 148 | 11.4 | 0 |

=== Punt returns ===
| Player | Returns | Yards | Yds/Return | TD |
|---|---|---|---|---|
| Mickey Depp | 7 | 22 | 3.1 | 0 |
| Joe Pohl | 4 | 34 | 8.5 | 0 |

== Team players drafted into the NFL ==
The following Panthers were chosen by NFL teams during their 1966 draft.

| Player | Position | Round | Pick | NFL club |
|---|---|---|---|---|
| Fred Hoaglin | Center | 6 | 93 | Cleveland Browns |
| Eric Crabtree | Wide receiver | 11 | 170 | Baltimore Colts |
| Joe Novogratz | Linebacker | 14 | 203 | Pittsburgh Steelers |
| Mitch Zalnasky | end | 17 | 251 | Washington Redskins |
| Kenny Lucas | quarterback | 18 | 263 | Pittsburgh Steelers |

== Team players drafted into the AFL ==
The following Panthers were chosen by AFL teams during their 1966 draft.

| Player | Position | Round | Pick | AFL club |
|---|---|---|---|---|
| Eric Crabtree | Wide receiver | 13 | 112 | Buffalo Bills |
| Joe Novogratz | Guard | 19 | 165 | Boston Patriots |
