= 1965 Arizona State Sun Devils football team =

American college football season

1965 Arizona State Sun Devils football
- Conference: Western Athletic Conference
- Record: 6–4 (3–1 WAC)
- Head coach: Frank Kush (8th season)
- Home stadium: Sun Devil Stadium

1965 Western Athletic Conference football standings
	Conf.					Overall
Team	W		L		T	W		L		T
BYU $	4	–	1	–	0	6	–	4	–	0
Arizona State	3	–	1	–	0	6	–	4	–	0
Wyoming	3	–	2	–	0	6	–	4	–	0
New Mexico	2	–	3	–	0	3	–	7	–	0
Utah	1	–	3	–	0	3	–	7	–	0
Arizona	1	–	4	–	0	3	–	7	–	0
$ – Conference champion

The 1965 Arizona State Sun Devils football team was an American football team that represented Arizona State University in the Western Athletic Conference (WAC) during the 1965 NCAA University Division football season. In their eighth season under head coach Frank Kush, the Sun Devils compiled a 6–4 record (3–1 against WAC opponents), finished in second place in the WAC, and were outscored by their opponents by a combined total of 142 to 132.

The team's statistical leaders included John Goodman with 1,165 passing yards, Travis Williams with 523 rushing yards, and Ben Hawkins with 504 receiving yards.

Don Baker, Dick Corrick, Bill Kajikawa, Paul Kemp, Jack Stovall, and Dick Tamburo were assistant coaches. The team captains were right tackle Bobby Johnson and linebacker John Folmer. The Sun Devils finished 5-2 at home and 1-2 on the road. All home games were played at Sun Devil Stadium in Tempe, Arizona.

== Schedule ==
Date	Opponent	Site	Result	Attendance	Source
September 18	BYU	Sun Devil Stadium; Tempe, AZ	L 6–24	35,354	
September 25	Utah State*	Sun Devil Stadium; Tempe, AZ	L 0–13	29,112	
October 2	at West Texas State*	Buffalo Bowl; Canyon, TX	L 14–22	17,000	
October 9	Wichita State*	Sun Devil Stadium; Tempe, AZ	W 8–6	24,687	
October 16	at San Jose State*	Spartan Stadium; San Jose, CA	L 14–21	13,600	
October 23	New Mexico	Sun Devil Stadium; Tempe, AZ	W 27–14	24,360	
October 30	at Texas Western*	Sun Bowl; El Paso, TX	W 28–20	25,753	
November 13	Washington State*	Sun Devil Stadium; Tempe, AZ	W 7–6	32,824	
November 20	Wyoming	Sun Devil Stadium; Tempe, AZ	W 14–10	23,371	
November 27	Arizona	Sun Devil Stadium; Tempe, AZ (rivalry)	W 14–6	38,782	
*Non-conference game

== Game summaries ==
On September 18, in the season opener at Sun Devil Stadium, Arizona State suffered a 24-6 loss to BYU.

On September 25, the Sun Devils dropped a 13-0 home contest to Utah State.

On October 2, Arizona State fell 22-14 against West Texas State on the road.

On October 9, the Sun Devils rebounded with an 8-6 home victory over Wichita State.

On October 16, Arizona State suffered a 21-14 road loss against San Jose State.

On October 23, the Sun Devils bounced back with a 27-14 home win over New Mexico.

On October 30, Arizona State outlasted Texas-El Paso for a 28-20 road victory.

On November 13, following a bye week, the Sun Devils defeated Washington State, 7-6, in Tempe.

On November 20, Arizona State prevailed for a 14-10 home win against Wyoming.

On November 27, in the annual Arizona–Arizona State football rivalry game, the Sun Devils closed the season with a 14-6 home win over Arizona.

== Roster ==
Arizona State's usual offensive lineup included wide receiver John Pitts, left tackle Ray Shirey, left guard George Corneal, center Bob Lueck, right guard Obie Lowe, right tackle Bobby Johnson, tight end Dewey Forrister, quarterback John Goodman, halfback Travis Williams, fullback Jim Bramlet, and wingback Ben Hawkins.

Arizona State's usual defensive lineup included left defensive end Jesse Fleming, left defensive tackle John Hanson, middle guard Curley Culp, right defensive tackle Bob Rokita, right defensive end Steve Timarac, linebackers Leo Rossi and John Folmer, left cornerback Reggie Jackson, right cornerback Ken Dyer, and safeties John Pitts and S. Darrell Hoover.

Bob Rokita was the team's regular punter and placekicker.

Cecil Abono, Max Anderson, Rick Davis, Dick Egloff, Larry Langford, and Paul Palumbo were also on the roster.

== Individual and team statistics ==
The team's individual statistical leaders included:

- Rushing: Travis Williams, 130 carries, 523 rushing yards, and 4.0 yards per carry
- Passing: John Goodman, 96-175, 1,165 passing yards, 54.9% completion percentage, nine touchdowns and four interceptions
- Scoring: Ben Hawkins (28 points on six touchdowns and a two-point conversion)
- Receiving: Ben Hawkins (36 receptions for 504 receiving yards and four receiving touchdowns)
- Interceptions: Ben Hawkins (4 interceptions and 125 return yards)
- Punting: Chuck Kolb (65 punts, 2,857 yards, and a 44.0 yard average)
- Kickoff returns: Ben Hawkins (10 returns for 201 yards)
- Punt returns: Ben Hawkins (19 returns for 191 yards)

Arizona State set single-season school records for the fewest interceptions thrown (four) and most yards per punt (44-yard average).

The team's statistical averages for the 1965 season included the following:

- Rushing yards: 128.2 yards per game on offense, 117.3 yards allowed per game on defense;
- Passing yards: 118.5 yards per game on offense, 152.3 yards allowed per game on defense;
- Total offense: 246.7 yards of total offense per game, 269.6 yards of total offense allowed per game on defense;
- Scoring: 13.2 points scored per game, 14.2 points allowed per game on defense;
- First downs: 140 first downs on offense, 145 first downs allowed on defense; and
- Punting: 66 total punts for an average of 44.8 yards per punt.

== Awards and honors ==
Wingback and defensive back Ben Hawkins received All-America honors from Time magazine and first-team All-Western Athletic Conference (WAC) honors. Hawkins also played in the Chicago College All-Star Game. Safety John Pitts received second-team All-WAC honors. Cornerback Ken Dyer played in the 1965 Senior Bowl.

Team awards were presented as follow:

- Wingback and defensive back Ben Hawkins won the Sun Angel Award;
- Center Bob Lueck won the Mike Bartholomew Award;
- Rick Davis won the Cecil Abono Captains Award;
- Fullback Jim Bramlet won the Glen Hawkins Sportsmanship Award; and
- Quarterback John Goodman won the Most Improved Award.
