= 1965 Oregon Ducks football team =

American college football season

1965 Oregon Ducks football
- Conference: Athletic Association of Western Universities
- Record: 4–5–1 (0–5 AAWU)
- Head coach: Len Casanova (15th season)
- Captains: Tim Casey; Mark Richards; Dave Tobey
- Home stadium: Hayward Field; Multnomah Stadium

1965 Athletic Association of Western Universities football standings
| | Conf. | | | | | Overall |
| Team | W | | L | | T | W | | L | | T |
|---|---|---|---|---|---|---|---|---|---|---|
| No. 4 UCLA $ | 4 | – | 0 | – | 0 | 8 | – | 2 | – | 1 |
| No. 10 USC | 4 | – | 1 | – | 0 | 7 | – | 2 | – | 1 |
| Washington State | 2 | – | 1 | – | 0 | 7 | – | 3 | – | 0 |
| Washington | 4 | – | 3 | – | 0 | 5 | – | 5 | – | 0 |
| Stanford | 2 | – | 3 | – | 0 | 6 | – | 3 | – | 1 |
| California | 2 | – | 3 | – | 0 | 5 | – | 5 | – | 0 |
| Oregon State | 1 | – | 3 | – | 0 | 5 | – | 5 | – | 0 |
| Oregon | 0 | – | 5 | – | 0 | 4 | – | 5 | – | 1 |
$ – Conference champion; Rankings from AP Poll

The 1965 Oregon Ducks football team represented University of Oregon in the Athletic Association of Western Universities (AAWU) during the 1965 NCAA University Division football season. The Ducks were led by fifteenth-year head coach Len Casanova and finished with a record of four wins, five losses, and one tie (4–5–1 overall, 0–5 in AAWU, last).

Three home games were played on campus at Hayward Field in Eugene and three at Multnomah Stadium in Portland.

== Schedule ==
| Date | Opponent | Site | Result | Attendance | Source |
|---|---|---|---|---|---|
| September 18 | at Pittsburgh* | Pitt Stadium; Pittsburgh, PA | W 17–15 | 31,916 | |
| September 25 | at Utah* | Ute Stadium; Salt Lake City, UT | W 31–14 | 19,393 | |
| October 2 | BYU* | Hayward Field; Eugene, OR | W 27–14 | 20,500 | |
| October 9 | at Stanford | Stanford Stadium; Stanford, CA | L 14–17 | 39,500 | |
| October 16 | Air Force* | Multnomah Stadium; Portland, OR | T 18–18 | 20,677 | |
| October 23 | Washington | Multnomah Stadium; Portland, OR (rivalry) | L 20–24 | 33,437 | |
| October 30 | Idaho*^{†} | Hayward Field; Eugene, OR | W 17–14 | 15,500 | |
| November 6 | at Washington State | Rogers Field; Pullman, WA | L 7–27 | 21,200 | |
| November 13 | California | Multnomah Stadium; Portland, OR | L 0–24 | 16,890 | |
| November 20 | Oregon State | Hayward Field; Eugene, OR (Civil War) | L 14–19 | 21,000 | |
*Non-conference game; ^{†}Homecoming; Source:
