= 1965 Oregon State Beavers football team =

American college football season

1965 Oregon State Beavers football
- Conference: Athletic Association of Western Universities
- Record: 5–5 (1–3 AAWU)
- Head coach: Dee Andros (1st season)
- Home stadium: Parker Stadium; Multnomah Stadium

1965 Athletic Association of Western Universities football standings
	Conf.					Overall
Team	W		L		T	W		L		T
No. 4 UCLA $	4	–	0	–	0	8	–	2	–	1
No. 10 USC	4	–	1	–	0	7	–	2	–	1
Washington State	2	–	1	–	0	7	–	3	–	0
Washington	4	–	3	–	0	5	–	5	–	0
Stanford	2	–	3	–	0	6	–	3	–	1
California	2	–	3	–	0	5	–	5	–	0
Oregon State	1	–	3	–	0	5	–	5	–	0
Oregon	0	–	5	–	0	4	–	5	–	1
$ – Conference champion; Rankings from AP Poll

The 1965 Oregon State Beavers football team represented Oregon State University in the Athletic Association of Western Universities (AAWU) during the 1965 NCAA University Division football season. In their first season under head coach Dee Andros, the Beavers compiled a 5–5 record (1–3 in AAWU, seventh), and were outscored 162 to 125. They had only three home games, two on campus at Parker Stadium in Corvallis and one at Multnomah Stadium in Portland.

After ten seasons and a recent Rose Bowl appearance, head coach Tommy Prothro departed for UCLA in January 1965, and forty-year-old Andros was hired in early February. A Marine in World War II, he was the head coach at Idaho (1962–1964), and had played college football as a guard at Oklahoma in the late 1940s under head coach Bud Wilkinson. Andros led OSU for eleven years, through 1975, compiling a 51–64–1 (.444) record, (30–37–1 (.449) in AAWU/Pac-8), then was the athletic director until 1985.

The Beavers defeated rival Oregon for a second consecutive year, this time on the road in the final installment of the Civil War contested at Hayward Field; when the Beavers returned to Eugene two years later, the Ducks had moved into Autzen Stadium. It was the first of seven straight wins for Andros in the Civil War game.

== Schedule ==
Date	Opponent	Site	Result	Attendance	Source
September 18	at Illinois*	Memorial Stadium; Champaign, IL	W 12–10	34,149	
September 25	Iowa*	Multnomah Stadium; Portland, OR	L 7–27	24,778	
October 2	at USC	Los Angeles Memorial Coliseum; Los Angeles, CA	L 12–26	52,100	
October 9	at Northwestern*	Dyche Stadium; Evanston, IL	L 7–15	34,575	
October 16	at Idaho*	old Bronco Stadium; Boise, ID	W 16–14	13,000	
October 23	Utah*	Parker Stadium; Corvallis, OR	W 10–6	15,304	
October 30	Washington State	Parker Stadium; Corvallis, OR	L 8–10	20,079	
November 6	at Syracuse*	Archbold Stadium; Syracuse, NY	W 13–12	33,000	
November 13	at Washington	Husky Stadium; Seattle, WA	L 21–28	53,500	
November 20	at Oregon	Hayward Field; Eugene, OR (Civil War)	W 19–14	21,000	
*Non-conference game; Source:

== Roster ==
- QB Paul Brothers, Jr.
- RB Bob Grim, Jr.
- RB Pete Pifer, Jr.
- Skip Vanderbrundt, So. (defense)
