= 1965 New Mexico Lobos football team =

American college football season

1965 New Mexico Lobos football
- Conference: Western Athletic Conference
- Record: 3–7 (2–3 WAC)
- Head coach: Bill Weeks (6th season)
- Home stadium: University Stadium

1965 Western Athletic Conference football standings
	Conf.					Overall
Team	W		L		T	W		L		T
BYU $	4	–	1	–	0	6	–	4	–	0
Arizona State	3	–	1	–	0	6	–	4	–	0
Wyoming	3	–	2	–	0	6	–	4	–	0
New Mexico	2	–	3	–	0	3	–	7	–	0
Utah	1	–	3	–	0	3	–	7	–	0
Arizona	1	–	4	–	0	3	–	7	–	0
$ – Conference champion

The 1965 New Mexico Lobos football team was an American football team that represented the University of New Mexico in the Western Athletic Conference (WAC) during the 1965 NCAA University Division football season. In their sixth season under head coach Bill Weeks, the Lobos compiled a 3–7 record (2–3 against WAC opponents) and were outscored, 226 to 127.

Quarterback Stan Quintana and Dave Hettema were the team captains. The team's statistical leaders included Quintana with 444 passing yards, Carl Jackson with 665 rushing yards and 60 points scored, and Woody Dame with 198 receiving yards.

== Schedule ==
Date	Opponent	Site	Result	Attendance	Source
September 25	Texas Western*	University Stadium; Albuquerque, NM	L 14–35	29,952	
October 2	Colorado State*	Colorado Field; Fort Collins, CO	L 22–27	13,500	
October 9	at Arizona	Arizona Stadium; Tucson, AZ (rivalry)	W 24–2	33,700	
October 16	Utah	University Stadium; Albuquerque, NM	W 13–10	25,000	
October 23	at Arizona State	Sun Devil Stadium; Tempe, AZ	L 14–27	24,360	
October 30	San Jose State*	University Stadium; Albuquerque, NM	L 7–27	17,948	
November 6	Wyoming	University Stadium; Albuquerque, NM	L 9–27	19,318	
November 13	at New Mexico State*	Memorial Stadium; Las Cruces, NM (rivalry)	L 6–20	17,500	
November 20	Iowa State*^{†}	University Stadium; Albuquerque, NM	W 10–9	17,346	
November 27	BYU	University Stadium; Albuquerque, NM	L 8–42	14,289	
*Non-conference game; ^{†}Homecoming
