= 1965 Arizona Wildcats football team =

American college football season

1965 Arizona Wildcats football
- Conference: Western Athletic Conference
- Record: 3–7 (1–4 WAC)
- Head coach: Jim LaRue (7th season)
- Captains: Tom Malloy; Woody King; Jim Pazerski
- Home stadium: Arizona Stadium

1965 Western Athletic Conference football standings
	Conf.					Overall
Team	W		L		T	W		L		T
BYU $	4	–	1	–	0	6	–	4	–	0
Arizona State	3	–	1	–	0	6	–	4	–	0
Wyoming	3	–	2	–	0	6	–	4	–	0
New Mexico	2	–	3	–	0	3	–	7	–	0
Utah	1	–	3	–	0	3	–	7	–	0
Arizona	1	–	4	–	0	3	–	7	–	0
$ – Conference champion

The 1965 Arizona Wildcats football team represented the University of Arizona in the Western Athletic Conference (WAC) during the 1965 NCAA University Division football season. In their seventh season under head coach Jim LaRue, the Wildcats compiled a 3–7 record (1–4 in WAC, last), and were outscored 172 to 77. Home games were played on campus at Arizona Stadium in Tucson, and the team captains were linebacker Tom Malloy, safety Woody King, and tackle Jim Pazerski.

Arizona scored 77 total points with only two touchdown passes by quarterbacks in the entire season. The Wildcats began the season with the first three games on the road. After their loss to Washington State on October 16, the Wildcats finished the rest of the season without leaving the state of Arizona, with four straight home games and the season finale on the road at Arizona State. The win over Texas Western on November 6 was the only victory at home for the Wildcats during the season.

Arizona's statistical leaders included Phil Albert with 559 passing yards, Brad Hubbert with 526 rushing yards, and Tim Plodinec with 191 receiving yards.

== Schedule ==
Date	Opponent	Site	Result	Attendance	Source
September 18	at Utah	Ute Stadium; Salt Lake City, UT	W 16–9	11,063	
September 25	at Kansas*	Memorial Stadium; Lawrence, KS	W 23–15	35,500	
October 2	at Wyoming	War Memorial Stadium; Laramie, WY	L 0–19	16,654	
October 9	New Mexico	Arizona Stadium; Tucson, AZ (rivalry)	L 2–24	33,700	
October 16	at Washington State*	Joe Albi Stadium; Spokane, WA	L 3–21	16,500	
October 23	San Jose State*	Arizona Stadium; Tucson, AZ	L 7–13	28,000–28,832	
November 6	Texas Western*	Arizona Stadium; Tucson, AZ	W 10–3	24,500	
November 13	Air Force*	Arizona Stadium; Tucson, AZ	L 7–34	27,800	
November 20	BYU	Arizona Stadium; Tucson, AZ	L 3–20	24,700	
November 27	at Arizona State	Sun Devil Stadium; Tempe, AZ (rivalry)	L 6–14	38,782	
*Non-conference game

== Coaching staff ==
- Ron Marciniak
- Ed Cavanaugh
- Jake Rowden
