= Kenny Lucas =

May refer to

- Kenny and Keith Lucas (born September 13, 1985), twin brothers, comedians and filmmakers
- Kenny Lucas (quarterback), American football player (1944–2026)
