= 1965 Stanford Indians football team =

American college football season

1965 Stanford Indians football
- Conference: Athletic Association of Western Universities
- Record: 6–3–1 (2–3 AAWU)
- Head coach: John Ralston (3rd season)
- Home stadium: Stanford Stadium

1965 Athletic Association of Western Universities football standings
	Conf.					Overall
Team	W		L		T	W		L		T
No. 4 UCLA $	4	–	0	–	0	8	–	2	–	1
No. 10 USC	4	–	1	–	0	7	–	2	–	1
Washington State	2	–	1	–	0	7	–	3	–	0
Washington	4	–	3	–	0	5	–	5	–	0
Stanford	2	–	3	–	0	6	–	3	–	1
California	2	–	3	–	0	5	–	5	–	0
Oregon State	1	–	3	–	0	5	–	5	–	0
Oregon	0	–	5	–	0	4	–	5	–	1
$ – Conference champion; Rankings from AP Poll

The 1965 Stanford Indians football team represented Stanford University in the 1965 NCAA University Division football season. The team was led by third-year head coach John Ralston and played their home games at Stanford Stadium in Stanford, California.

Stanford finished with a losing record within the AAWU conference, but were undefeated (4–0–1) outside the conference. They were led by defensive end Gary Pettigrew and fullback Ray Handley.

== Schedule ==
Date	Opponent	Site	Result	Attendance	Source
September 18	San Jose State*	Stanford Stadium; Stanford, CA (rivalry)	W 26–6	31,031	
September 25	Navy*	Stanford Stadium; Stanford, CA	T 7–7	52,000	
October 2	at Air Force*	Falcon Stadium; Colorado Springs, CO	W 17–16	21,861	
October 9	Oregon	Stanford Stadium; Stanford, CA	W 17–14	39,500	
October 16	at No. 6 USC	Los Angeles Memorial Coliseum; Los Angeles, CA (rivalry)	L 0–14	61,618	
October 23	Army*	Stanford Stadium; Stanford, CA	W 31–14	56,000	
October 30	at Washington	Husky Stadium; Seattle, WA	L 8–41	51,000	
November 6	at Tulane*	Tulane Stadium; New Orleans, LA	W 16–0	15,000	
November 13	No. 7 UCLA	Stanford Stadium; Stanford, CA	L 13–30	20,500	
November 20	California	Stanford Stadium; Stanford, CA (Big Game)	W 9–7	78,000	
*Non-conference game; Rankings from AP Poll released prior to the game; Source:

== Players drafted by the NFL/AFL ==
Player	Position	Round	Pick	NFL/AFL Club (Note: AFL Draft selections shown in italics.)
Gary Pettigrew	Defensive tackle	2/6	20/49	Philadelphia Eagles/San Diego Chargers (Note: Signed with Philadelphia.)
John Mason	End	8	114	Philadelphia Eagles
Craig Ritchey	Defensive back	16	143	Oakland Raiders
