= 1965 California Golden Bears football team =

American college football season

1965 California Golden Bears football
- Conference: Athletic Association of Western Universities
- Record: 5–5 (2–3 AAWU)
- Head coach: Ray Willsey (2nd season)
- Home stadium: California Memorial Stadium

1965 Athletic Association of Western Universities football standings
	Conf.					Overall
Team	W		L		T	W		L		T
No. 4 UCLA $	4	–	0	–	0	8	–	2	–	1
No. 10 USC	4	–	1	–	0	7	–	2	–	1
Washington State	2	–	1	–	0	7	–	3	–	0
Washington	4	–	3	–	0	5	–	5	–	0
Stanford	2	–	3	–	0	6	–	3	–	1
California	2	–	3	–	0	5	–	5	–	0
Oregon State	1	–	3	–	0	5	–	5	–	0
Oregon	0	–	5	–	0	4	–	5	–	1
$ – Conference champion; Rankings from AP Poll

The 1965 California Golden Bears football team was an American football team that represented the University of California, Berkeley in the Athletic Association of Western Universities (AAWU) during the 1965 NCAA University Division football season. In their second year under head coach Ray Willsey, the Golden Bears compiled a 5–5 record (2–3 in AAWU, fifth) and were outscored 194 to 125. Home games were played on campus at California Memorial Stadium in Berkeley, California.

California's statistical leaders on offense were quarterback Jim Hunt with 383 passing yards, Tom Relles with 485 rushing yards, and Jerry Bradley with 360 receiving yards.

== Schedule ==
Date	Opponent	Site	Result	Attendance	Source
September 18	No. 3 Notre Dame*	California Memorial Stadium; Berkeley, CA	L 6–48	53,000	
September 25	at No. 4 Michigan*	Michigan Stadium; Ann Arbor, MI	L 7–10	81,417	
October 2	Kansas*	California Memorial Stadium; Berkeley, CA	W 17–0	32,000	
October 9	at Air Force*	Falcon Stadium; Colorado Springs, CO	W 24–7	29,470	
October 16	Washington	California Memorial Stadium; Berkeley, CA	W 16–12	35,000	
October 23	at UCLA	Los Angeles Memorial Coliseum; Los Angeles, CA (rivalry)	L 3–56	39,542	
October 30	Penn State*	California Memorial Stadium; Berkeley, CA	W 21–17	38,000	
November 6	No. 6 USC	California Memorial Stadium; Berkeley, CA	L 0–35	52,000	
November 13	at Oregon	Multnomah Stadium; Portland, OR	W 24–0	16,890	
November 20	at Stanford	Stanford Stadium; Stanford, CA (Big Game)	L 7–9	78,000	
*Non-conference game; Rankings from AP Poll released prior to the game; Source:
