= 1965 BYU Cougars football team =

American college football season

1965 BYU Cougars football

WAC champion
- Conference: Western Athletic Conference
- Record: 6–4 (4–1 WAC)
- Head coach: Tommy Hudspeth (2nd season)
- Home stadium: Cougar Stadium

1965 Western Athletic Conference football standings
	Conf.					Overall
Team	W		L		T	W		L		T
BYU $	4	–	1	–	0	6	–	4	–	0
Arizona State	3	–	1	–	0	6	–	4	–	0
Wyoming	3	–	2	–	0	6	–	4	–	0
New Mexico	2	–	3	–	0	3	–	7	–	0
Utah	1	–	3	–	0	3	–	7	–	0
Arizona	1	–	4	–	0	3	–	7	–	0
$ – Conference champion

The 1965 BYU Cougars football team was an American football team that represented Brigham Young University (BYU) as a member of the Western Athletic Conference (WAC) during the 1965 NCAA University Division football season. In their second season under head coach Tommy Hudspeth, the Cougars compiled an overall record of 6–4 with a mark of 4–1 in conference play, won the WAC title, and outscored opponents 229 to 178. The conference championship was the first in program history.

The Cougars' statistical leaders included Virgil Carter with 1,789 passing yards, John Ogden with 700 rushing yards, and Phil Odle with 657 receiving yards and 66 points scored.

The morning of the season finale at New Mexico, a chartered DC-3 with thirteen aboard crashed in a snowstorm near Camp Williams, between Salt Lake City and Provo, Utah. It was bound for Provo to pick up more passengers for the afternoon game in Albuquerque; there were no survivors.

== Schedule ==
Date	Opponent	Site	Result	Attendance	Source
September 18	at Arizona State	Sun Devil Stadium; Tempe, AZ	W 24–6		
September 24	Kansas State*	Cougar Stadium; Provo, UT	W 21–3	26,335	
October 2	at Oregon*	Hayward Field; Eugene, OR	L 14–27	20,500	
October 8	San Jose State	Cougar Stadium; Provo, UT	W 34–7	19,559	
October 23	at Wyoming	War Memorial Stadium; Laramie, WY	L 6–34	19,671	
October 30	at Utah State*	Romney Stadium; Logan, UT (rivalry)	L 21–34	15,596	
November 6	Utah^{†}	Cougar Stadium; Provo, UT (rivalry)	W 25–20	29,842	
November 13	Colorado State*	Cougar Stadium; Provo, UT	L 22–36	20,356	
November 20	at Arizona	Arizona Stadium; Tucson, AZ	W 20–3	24,700	
November 27	at New Mexico	University Stadium; Albuquerque, NM	W 42–8	14,289	
*Non-conference game; ^{†}Homecoming

== Roster ==
1965 BYU Cougars football team roster
Players
Coaches
Offense

Pos.	#	Name	Class
QB	14	Virgil Carter	Jr
TB/WB	22	Kent Oborn	Jr
WR	88	Phil Odle	So

Defense

Pos.	#	Name	Class

Special teams

Pos.	#	Name	Class

Head coach

- Tommy Hudspeth

Coordinators/assistant coaches

Legend

- (C) Team captain
- (S) Suspended
- (I) Ineligible
- Injured
- Redshirt

Roster
