= 1965 Wyoming Cowboys football team =

American college football season

1965 Wyoming Cowboys football
- Conference: Western Athletic Conference
- Record: 6–4 (3–2 WAC)
- Head coach: Lloyd Eaton (4th season)
- Captains: Darryl Alleman; Tom Wilkinson
- Home stadium: War Memorial Stadium

1965 Western Athletic Conference football standings
	Conf.					Overall
Team	W		L		T	W		L		T
BYU $	4	–	1	–	0	6	–	4	–	0
Arizona State	3	–	1	–	0	6	–	4	–	0
Wyoming	3	–	2	–	0	6	–	4	–	0
New Mexico	2	–	3	–	0	3	–	7	–	0
Utah	1	–	3	–	0	3	–	7	–	0
Arizona	1	–	4	–	0	3	–	7	–	0
$ – Conference champion

The 1965 Wyoming Cowboys football team was an American football team that represented the University of Wyoming as a member of the Western Athletic Conference (WAC) during the 1965 NCAA University Division football season. In their fourth year under head coach Lloyd Eaton, the Cowboys compiled a 6–4 record (3–2 against conference opponents), finished third in the WAC, and outscored opponents by a total of 201 to 182. They played their home games on campus at War Memorial Stadium in Laramie, Wyoming. In the opening game of the season, they began a 22-game home winning streak, which lasted five seasons, until the opening game of the 1970 season.

== Schedule ==
Date	Opponent	Site	Result	Attendance	Source
September 18	Air Force*	War Memorial Stadium; Laramie, WY	W 31–14	18,510	
September 25	at Colorado State*	Colorado Field; Fort Collins, CO (rivalry)	W 33–14	14,355	
October 2	Arizona	War Memorial Stadium; Laramie, WY	W 19–0	16,654	
October 9	at Utah	Ute Stadium; Salt Lake City, UT	L 3–42	21,069	
October 16	Texas Western*	War Memorial Stadium; Laramie, WY	W 38–14	16,747	
October 23	BYU	War Memorial Stadium; Laramie, WY	W 34–6	19,671	
November 6	at New Mexico	University Stadium; Albuquerque, NM	W 27–9	19,318	
November 13	at Army*	Michie Stadium; West Point, NY	L 0–13	25,000	
November 20	at Arizona State	Sun Devil Stadium; Tempe, AZ	L 10–14	23,371	
November 27	at No. 8 USC*	Los Angeles Memorial Coliseum; Los Angeles, CA	L 6–56	39,233	
*Non-conference game; Rankings from AP Poll released prior to the game

== NFL draft ==
Two Cowboys were selected in the 1966 NFL draft, which lasted 20 rounds (305 selections).

Player	Position	Round	Overall	Franchise
Jerry Marion	Defensive back	10	143	Pittsburgh Steelers
Darryl Alleman	Wide receiver	15	224	St. Louis Cardinals
