= 1965 Washington State Cougars football team =

American college football season

1965 Washington State Cougars football
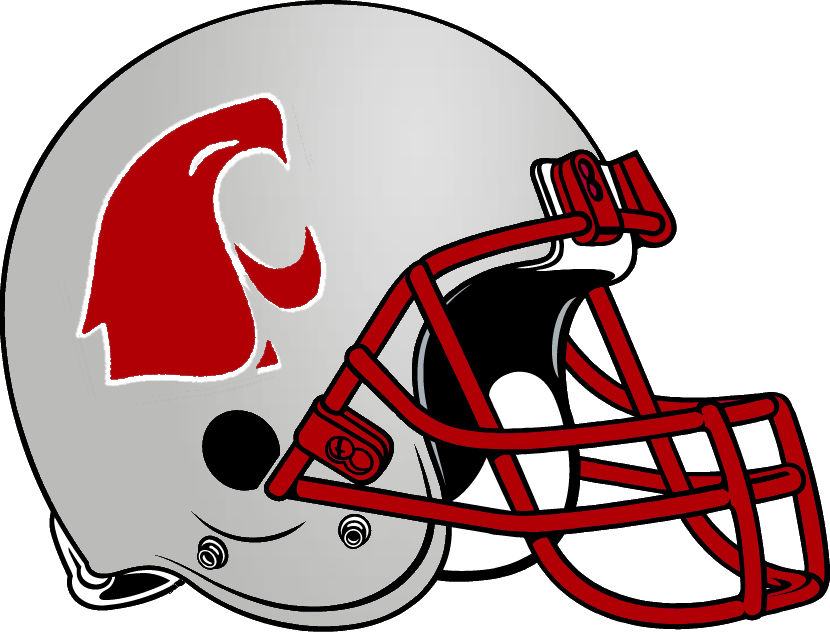
- Conference: Athletic Association of Western Universities
- Record: 7–3 (2–1 AAWU)
- Head coach: Bert Clark (2nd season)
- Home stadium: Rogers Field, Joe Albi Stadium

1965 Athletic Association of Western Universities football standings
	Conf.					Overall
Team	W		L		T	W		L		T
No. 4 UCLA $	4	–	0	–	0	8	–	2	–	1
No. 10 USC	4	–	1	–	0	7	–	2	–	1
Washington State	2	–	1	–	0	7	–	3	–	0
Washington	4	–	3	–	0	5	–	5	–	0
Stanford	2	–	3	–	0	6	–	3	–	1
California	2	–	3	–	0	5	–	5	–	0
Oregon State	1	–	3	–	0	5	–	5	–	0
Oregon	0	–	5	–	0	4	–	5	–	1
$ – Conference champion; Rankings from AP Poll

The 1965 Washington State Cougars football team was an American football team that represented Washington State University in the Athletic Association of Western Universities (AAWU) during the 1965 NCAA University Division football season. In their second season under head coach Bert Clark, the Cougars compiled a 7–3 record (2–1 in AAWU, third), and outscored their opponents 139 to 103.

The team's statistical leaders included Tom Roth with 1,257 passing yards, Larry Eilmes with 818 rushing yards, and Doug Flansburg with 578 receiving yards.

The Cougars played only three conference games, all against Northwest teams, defeating Oregon State and Oregon. With several close margins in their games, they became known as the "Cardiac Kids."

WSU dropped both rivalry games this season: the Battle of the Palouse at home to Idaho, and the Apple Cup to Washington in Seattle, which eliminated a possible Rose Bowl berth.

== Schedule ==
Date	Opponent	Site	Result	Attendance	Source
September 18	at Iowa*	Iowa Stadium; Iowa City, IA	W 7–0	53,000	
September 25	at Minnesota*	Memorial Stadium; Minneapolis, MN	W 14–13	46,917	
October 2	Idaho*	Rogers Field; Pullman, WA (Battle of the Palouse)	L 13–17	22,600	
October 9	Villanova*	Joe Albi Stadium; Spokane, WA	W 24–14	14,500	
October 16	Arizona*	Joe Albi Stadium; Spokane, WA	W 21–3	16,500	
October 23	at Indiana*	Seventeenth Street Stadium; Bloomington, IN	W 8–7	32,601	
October 30	at Oregon State	Parker Stadium; Corvallis, OR	W 10–8	20,079	
November 6	Oregon^{†}	Rogers Field; Pullman, WA	W 27–7	21,200	
November 13	at Arizona State*	Sun Devil Stadium; Tempe, AZ	L 6–7	32,872	
November 20	at Washington	Husky Stadium; Seattle, WA (Apple Cup)	L 9–27	56,800	
*Non-conference game; ^{†}Homecoming; Source:

== Roster ==
1965 Washington State Cougars football team roster
Players
Coaches
Offense

Pos.	#	Name	Class
OT	71	Brian Beveridge	Sr
HB	44	Mel Brady	Sr
FB	33	Larry Eilmes	Sr
SE	80	Doug Flansburg	So
HB	22	Ted Gerela	So
G	65	Robin Larson	Jr
HB	40	T.C. McClellan	Sr
G	68	Dave Middendorf	So
QB	15	Dave Petersen	Jr
QB	12	Mike Price	So
QB	11	Tom Roth	Sr
TE	88	Rich Sheron	Jr
HB	42	Bob Simpson	So
OT	55	Dave Thomas	Jr
C	52	Ron Vrlicak	Jr

Defense

Pos.	#	Name	Class
MG	60	Jerry Anderson	So
CB	43	Huarleen Bain
LB	32	Dick Baird	So
DT	72	Burgess Bauder	Jr
LB	66	Steve Boots	So
DT	77	Wayne Foster	Sr
S	20	Bill Gaskins	Sr
DE	85	Craig Goodwin	So
LB	61	Larry Griffith	Jr
CB	23	Bob Hively	So
CB	24	Jim Newson	Jr
CB	25	Jerry Strong	Jr
DE	83	John Thompson	So
LB	34	Mark Wicks	So

Special teams

Pos.	#	Name	Class
PK	22	Ted Gerela	So
P	14	Jim Engstrom	So

Head coach

- Bert Clark (2nd year)

Coordinators/assistant coaches

- Laurie Niemi
- King Block
- Red Smith
- Joe Marvin
- Jim Shanley
- John Nelson

Legend

- (C) Team captain
- (S) Suspended
- (I) Ineligible
- Injured
- Redshirt

== NFL and AFL drafts ==
This was the final year for separate drafts; both were held on November 27, 1965.

=== NFL ===
No Cougars were selected in the 1966 NFL draft.

=== AFL ===
One Cougar was selected in the 1966 AFL draft.

Player	Position	Round	Overall	Franchise
Wayne Foster	Tackle	12	107	Oakland Raiders
