= 1965 USC Trojans football team =

American college football season

1965 USC Trojans football
- Conference: Athletic Association of Western Universities

Ranking
- Coaches: No. 9
- AP: No. 10
- Record: 7–2–1 (4–1 AAWU)
- Head coach: John McKay (6th season)
- Captains: Chuck Arrobio; Mike Garrett
- Home stadium: Los Angeles Memorial Coliseum

1965 Athletic Association of Western Universities football standings
	Conf.					Overall
Team	W		L		T	W		L		T
No. 4 UCLA $	4	–	0	–	0	8	–	2	–	1
No. 10 USC	4	–	1	–	0	7	–	2	–	1
Washington State	2	–	1	–	0	7	–	3	–	0
Washington	4	–	3	–	0	5	–	5	–	0
Stanford	2	–	3	–	0	6	–	3	–	1
California	2	–	3	–	0	5	–	5	–	0
Oregon State	1	–	3	–	0	5	–	5	–	0
Oregon	0	–	5	–	0	4	–	5	–	1
$ – Conference champion; Rankings from AP Poll

The 1965 USC Trojans football team represented the University of Southern California (USC) in the 1965 NCAA University Division football season. In their sixth year under head coach John McKay, the Trojans compiled a 7–2–1 record (4–1 against conference opponents), finished in second place in the Athletic Association of Western Universities (AAWU or Pac-8), and outscored their opponents by a combined total of 262 to 92. The team was ranked tenth in the final AP Poll and ninth in the final Coaches Poll.

Quarterback Troy Winslow led the team in passing, completing 78 of 128 passes for 1,019 yards with 11 touchdowns and 9 interceptions. Mike Garrett won the Heisman Trophy and led the team in rushing with 267 carries for 1,440 yards and 13 touchdowns. Dave Moton led the team in receiving with 29 catches for 493 yards and five touchdowns.

== Schedule ==
Date	Opponent	Rank	Site	Result	Attendance	Source
September 17	Minnesota*	No. 7	Los Angeles Memorial Coliseum; Los Angeles, CA	T 20–20	58,497	
September 25	at Wisconsin*		Camp Randall Stadium; Madison, WI	W 26–6	52,706	
October 2	Oregon State		Los Angeles Memorial Coliseum; Los Angeles, CA	W 26–12	52,100	
October 9	at Washington	No. 8	Husky Stadium; Seattle, WA	W 34–0	56,000	
October 16	Stanford	No. 6	Los Angeles Memorial Coliseum; Los Angeles, CA (rivalry)	W 14–0	61,618	
October 23	at No. 7 Notre Dame*	No. 4	Notre Dame Stadium; Notre Dame, IN (rivalry)	L 7–28	59,235	
November 6	at California	No. 6	California Memorial Stadium; Berkeley, CA	W 35–0	52,000	
November 13	Pittsburgh*	No. 6	Los Angeles Memorial Coliseum; Los Angeles, CA	W 28–0	40,339	
November 20	No. 7 UCLA^{†}	No. 6	Los Angeles Memorial Coliseum; Los Angeles, CA (Victory Bell)	L 16–20	94,085	
November 27	Wyoming*	No. 8	Los Angeles Memorial Coliseum; Los Angeles, CA	W 56–6	39,233	
*Non-conference game; ^{†}Homecoming; Rankings from AP Poll released prior to the game; Source:

== Game summaries ==
=== UCLA ===
	1	2	3	4	Total
UCLA	6	0	0	14	20
USC	0	7	0	9	16

- Mike Garrett 40 rushes, 210 yards

=== Wyoming ===
Statistics

- Receiving: David Moton 5 receptions, 181 yards, 3 TD

== 1965 team players in the NFL ==
The following players were drafted into professional football following the season.

Player	Position	Round	Pick	Franchise
Rod Sherman	Halfback	4	54	Baltimore Colts
Jeff Smith	Defensive end	10	151	New York Giants
Ed King	Linebacker	13	198	Green Bay Packers
Bob Miller	Tackle	14	211	Detroit Lions
Dave Moton	End	19	288	Green Bay Packers

== Awards and honors ==
- Mike Garrett, Heisman Trophy
