= 1965 Utah Utes football team =

American college football season

1965 Utah Utes football
- Conference: Western Athletic Conference
- Record: 3–7 (1–3 WAC)
- Head coach: Ray Nagel (8th season)
- Home stadium: Ute Stadium

1965 Western Athletic Conference football standings
	Conf.					Overall
Team	W		L		T	W		L		T
BYU $	4	–	1	–	0	6	–	4	–	0
Arizona State	3	–	1	–	0	6	–	4	–	0
Wyoming	3	–	2	–	0	6	–	4	–	0
New Mexico	2	–	3	–	0	3	–	7	–	0
Utah	1	–	3	–	0	3	–	7	–	0
Arizona	1	–	4	–	0	3	–	7	–	0
$ – Conference champion

The 1965 Utah Utes football team, or also commonly known as the Utah Redskins, was an American football team that represented the University of Utah as a member of the Western Athletic Conference (WAC) during the 1965 NCAA University Division football season. In their eighth and final season under head coach Ray Nagel, the Utes compiled an overall record of 3–7 with a mark of 1–3 against conference opponents, placing fifth in the WAC. Home games were played on campus at Ute Stadium in Salt Lake City.

Following a 2–2 start, Utah won just once in the final six games. After the season, in December, Nagel left Utah to become the head football coach at the University of Iowa.

== Schedule ==
Date	Opponent	Site	Result	Attendance	Source
September 11	Montana*	Ute Stadium; Salt Lake City, UT	W 28–13	13,431	
September 18	Arizona	Ute Stadium; Salt Lake City, UT	L 9–16	11,063	
September 25	Oregon*	Ute Stadium; Salt Lake City, UT	L 14–31	19,393	
October 9	Wyoming	Ute Stadium; Salt Lake City, UT	W 42–3	21,069	
October 16	at New Mexico	University Stadium; Albuquerque, NM	L 10–13	25,000	
October 23	at Oregon State*	Parker Stadium; Corvallis, OR	L 6–10	15,304	
October 30	Colorado State*^{†}	Ute Stadium; Salt Lake City, UT	W 22–19	17,065	
November 6	at BYU	Cougar Stadium; Provo, UT (rivalry)	L 20–25	29,842	
November 13	Texas Western*	Ute Stadium; Salt Lake City, UT	L 19–20	8,833	
November 20	Utah State*	Ute Stadium; Salt Lake City, UT (rivalry)	L 7–14	20,357	
*Non-conference game; ^{†}Homecoming

== NFL draft ==
One Utah player was selected in the 1966 NFL draft.

Player	Position	Round	Pick	NFL team
John Stipech	Linebacker	12	175	Washington Redskins
