= 1965 UCLA Bruins football team =

American college football season

1965 UCLA Bruins football

AAWU champion Rose Bowl champion

Rose Bowl, W 14–12 vs. Michigan State
- Conference: Athletic Association of Western Universities

Ranking
- Coaches: No. 5
- AP: No. 4
- Record: 8–2–1 (4–0 AAWU)
- Head coach: Tommy Prothro (1st season)
- Home stadium: Los Angeles Memorial Coliseum

1965 Athletic Association of Western Universities football standings
	Conf.					Overall
Team	W		L		T	W		L		T
No. 4 UCLA $	4	–	0	–	0	8	–	2	–	1
No. 10 USC	4	–	1	–	0	7	–	2	–	1
Washington State	2	–	1	–	0	7	–	3	–	0
Washington	4	–	3	–	0	5	–	5	–	0
Stanford	2	–	3	–	0	6	–	3	–	1
California	2	–	3	–	0	5	–	5	–	0
Oregon State	1	–	3	–	0	5	–	5	–	0
Oregon	0	–	5	–	0	4	–	5	–	1
$ – Conference champion; Rankings from AP Poll

The 1965 UCLA Bruins football team represented University of California, Los Angeles (UCLA) in the 1965 NCAA University Division football season. The team was led by first-year head coach Tommy Prothro, who succeeded William F. Barnes, Under sophomore quarterback Gary Beban, the team finished the regular season with a 8–2–1 record and the AAWU (Pac-8) conference championship.

In the Rose Bowl on New Year's Day, UCLA upset top-ranked and undefeated Michigan State, who had beaten them in the season opener in September. The Bruins finished at 8–2–1, were fourth in the final AP Poll, and outscored their opponents 257 to 168.

Hired in January, Prothro was previously the head coach at Oregon State for ten seasons and a former UCLA assistant.

The Bruins lost their season opening game 13–3 at Michigan State, who then rose to become a top-ranked team in the country. The unheralded Bruins went on a seven-game undefeated streak, surprising eastern national powers like Penn State and Syracuse.

Ranked seventh entering the rivalry game with #6 USC on November 20, with the conference championship and a Rose Bowl berth on the line. The Trojans, with Heisman Trophy winner Mike Garrett, led 16–6 until UCLA got a touchdown on a pass from Gary Beban to Dick Witcher with four minutes to play. After the two-point conversion made it 16–14, UCLA recovered an onside kick. Beban then hit Kurt Altenberg on a fifty-yard bomb and the Bruins prevailed, 20–16.

Two weeks later, integrated #5 UCLA then faced all-white #7 Tennessee in the newly-built Liberty Bowl stadium in Memphis, Prothro's native city. On the last play of the game, Tennessee defensive back Bob Petrella intercepted a UCLA pass to save a 37–34 Volunteer win. Tennessee's winning drive was aided by a controversial pass interference call, the clock had questionably stopped twice, and a dropped pass that appeared to be a lateral was recovered by UCLA but was later ruled an incomplete forward pass. After the game, Prothro stated, "For the first time in my life, I am ashamed to be a Southerner."

== Schedule ==
Date	Opponent	Rank	Site	Result	Attendance	Source
September 18	at Michigan State*		Spartan Stadium; East Lansing, MI	L 3–13	51,279	
October 2	at Penn State*		Beaver Stadium; University Park, PA	W 24–22	46,345	
October 9	Syracuse*		Los Angeles Memorial Coliseum; Los Angeles, CA	W 24–14	27,729	
October 16	at Missouri*		Memorial Stadium; Columbia, MO	T 14–14	47,000	
October 23	California		Los Angeles Memorial Coliseum; Los Angeles, CA (rivalry)	W 56–3	39,542	
October 30	at Air Force*		Falcon Stadium; Colorado Springs, CO	W 10–0	28,234	
November 6	Washington	No. 8	Los Angeles Memorial Coliseum; Los Angeles, CA	W 28–24	46,084	
November 13	at Stanford	No. 7	Stanford Stadium; Stanfor, CA	W 30–13	20,500	
November 20	at No. 6 USC	No. 7	Los Angeles Memorial Coliseum; Los Angeles, CA (Victory Bell)	W 20–16	94,085	
December 4	at No. 7 Tennessee*	No. 5	Memphis Memorial Stadium; Memphis, TN	L 34–37	44,495	
January 1, 1966	vs. No. 1 Michigan State*	No. 5	Rose Bowl; Pasadena, CA (Rose Bowl)	W 14–12	100,087	
*Non-conference game; Rankings from AP Poll released prior to the game; Source:

== Game summaries ==
=== USC ===
	1	2	3	4	Total
UCLA	6	0	0	14	20
USC	0	7	0	9	16

=== Michigan State (Rose Bowl) ===
	1	2	3	4	Total
#5 UCLA	0	14	0	0	14
#1 Michigan State	0	0	0	12	12

The fifth-ranked Bruins went to the Rose Bowl on New Year's Day as a 14½-point underdog in a rematch with undefeated and #1 ranked powerhouse Michigan State. UCLA, now dubbed "The Miracle Bruins" by Sports Illustrated, vanquished the heavily-favored Spartans 14–12. That victory gave UCLA an 8–2–1 mark, prevented the Spartans from winning the AP title, and resulted in Prothro earning Coach of the Year accolades from his coaching colleagues. UCLA finished fourth, and due to their small size, earned the moniker "Gutty little Bruins."

1st quarter scoring: No scoring

2nd quarter scoring: UCLA – Gary Beban 1-yard run (Kurt Zimmerman kick); UCLA – Beban 1-yard run (Zimmerman kick)

3rd quarter scoring: No scoring

4th quarter scoring: MSU – Bob Apisa 38-yard run (Jimmy Raye pass fail); MSU – Juday 1-yard run (Apisa run fail)

=== Statistics ===
Team stats	UCLA	Michigan St.
First downs	10	13
Net Yards Rushing	65	204
Net Yards Passing	147	110
Total Yards	212	314
PC–PA–Int.	8–20–0	8–22–3
Punts–Avg.	11–39.9	5–42.4
Fumbles–Lost	3–2	3–2
Penalties–Yards	9–86	1–14

== Awards and honors ==
- All-Coast/Conference First Team: Kurt Altenberg (E), Russ Banducci (T), Gary Beban (QB), Jim Colletto (E), Mel Farr (H), John Richardson (G), Bob Stiles (H)
