= Ron Medved =

American football player (born 1944)

No. 45
- Positions: Defensive back, Linebacker

Personal information
- Born: May 27, 1944 (age 82); Tacoma, Washington, U.S.
- Listed height: 6 ft 1 in (1.85 m)
- Listed weight: 210 lb (95 kg)

Career information
- High school: Bellarmine Prep (Tacoma)
- College: Washington (1962-1965)
- NFL draft: 1966: 14th round, 204th overall pick

Career history
- Philadelphia Eagles (1966–1970)

Awards and highlights
- Second-team All-PCC (1965)

Career NFL statistics
- Interceptions: 3
- Fumble recoveries: 2
- Stats at Pro Football Reference

Ronald George Medved (born May 27, 1944) is an American former professional football player who played defensive back and linebacker for five seasons for the Philadelphia Eagles.

From Tacoma, Washington, Medved graduated from Bellarmine Prep in 1962 and played college football at the University of Washington in Seattle under head coach Jim Owens. He was selected in the fourteenth round of the 1966 NFL draft by the Eagles (204th overall).

Medved was the oldest of twelve children (nine sons); the youngest were identical twins Jerry and Jim, linebackers at the University of Idaho in the late 1980s. Ron was on an NFL roster before they were born.
