= Kenny Lucas (quarterback) =

Profile
- Position: Quarterback

Personal information
- Born: February 13, 1944; Glassport, Pennsylvania, U.S.
- Died: January 20, 2026 (aged 81)

Career information
- High school: Glassport (PA)
- College: Pittsburgh (1962–1965)

Kenny Lucas (February 13, 1944 – January 20, 2026) was an American football quarterback.

Lucas played college football for Pittsburgh from 1963 to 1965. In 1965, he ranked among the leading quarterbacks in major-college football with 1,921 passing yards (4th), 1,762 total yards (5th), 144 pass completions (6th), 268 pass attempts (6th), a 53.7 completion percentage (9th), and 15 interceptions (10th). He was selected as the first-team quarterback on the University Division All-East team in 1965.

Lucas's brother Richie Lucas was an All-American quarterback for Penn State.

Lucas was selected by Pittsburgh Steelers in the 18th round (263rd overall) of the 1966 NFL draft. He signed with the Steelers but was released before the regular season began. He played for the Hartford Charter Oaks of the Continental Football League in 1966.

Lucas later worked as a sales representative for Karsten Manufacturing. He died in January 2026.
