= 1965 Big Ten Conference football season =

- Sport: American football
- Teams: 10
- Top draft pick: Tom Mack
- Champion: Michigan State
- Runners-up: Ohio State
- Season MVP: Jim Grabowski

Seasons
- ← 1964 1966 →

1965 Big Ten Conference football standings
	Conf.					Overall
Team	W		L		T	W		L		T
No. 2 Michigan State $	7	–	0	–	0	10	–	1	–	0
Ohio State	6	–	1	–	0	7	–	2	–	0
Purdue	5	–	2	–	0	7	–	2	–	1
Minnesota	5	–	2	–	0	5	–	4	–	1
Illinois	4	–	3	–	0	6	–	4	–	0
Northwestern	3	–	4	–	0	4	–	6	–	0
Michigan	2	–	5	–	0	4	–	6	–	0
Wisconsin	2	–	5	–	0	2	–	7	–	1
Indiana	1	–	6	–	0	2	–	8	–	0
Iowa	0	–	7	–	0	1	–	9	–	0
$ – Conference champion; Rankings from AP Poll

The 1965 Big Ten Conference football season was the 70th season of college football played by the member schools of the Big Ten Conference and was a part of the 1965 NCAA University Division football season.

This was the first year Big Ten teams were allowed to play 10 regular season games. Ohio State was the lone school not to play a 10th game, sticking with nine-game regular seasons through 1970.

== Season overview ==
=== Results and team statistics ===
Conf. Rank	Team	Head coach	AP final	AP high	Overall record	Conf. record	PPG	PAG	MVP
1	Michigan State	Duffy Daugherty	#2	#1	10–1	7–0	**23.9**	**6.9**	Steve Juday
2	Ohio State	Woody Hayes	NR	#10	7–2	6–1	17.3	13.1	Doug Van Horn
3 (tie)	Purdue	Jack Mollenkopf	NR	#2	7–2–1	5–2	22.7	12.7	Bob Griese
3 (tie)	Minnesota	Murray Warmath	NR	NR	5–4–1	5–2	18.8	16.0	John Hankinson
5	Illinois	Pete Elliott	NR	NR	6–4	4–3	23.5	11.8	**Jim Grabowski**
6	Northwestern	Alex Agase	NR	NR	4–6	3–4	14.1	20.8	Jim Burns
7 (tie)	Michigan	Bump Elliott	NR	#4	4–6	2–5	18.5	16.1	Bill Yearby
7 (tie)	Wisconsin	Milt Bruhn	NR	NR	2–7–1	2–5	8.1	29.1	Tom Brigham
9	Indiana	John Pont	NR	NR	2–8	1–6	13.4	22.5	Bill Malinchak
10	Iowa	Jerry Burns	NR	NR	1–9	0–7	9.4	19.2	Dave Long

Key
AP final = Team's rank in the final AP Poll of the 1965 season
AP high = Team's highest rank in the AP Poll throughout the 1965 season
PPG = Average of points scored per game
PAG = Average of points allowed per game
MVP = Most valuable player as voted by players on each team as part of the voting process to determine the winner of the Chicago Tribune Silver Football trophy; trophy winner in bold

== Statistical leaders ==
The Big Ten's individual statistical leaders for the 1965 season include the following:

=== Passing yards ===
Rank	Name	Team	Yards
1	Bob Griese	Purdue	1,719
2	John Hankinson	Minnesota	1,483
3	Steve Juday	Michigan State	1,253
4	Charles Burt	Wisconsin	1,143
5	Fred Custardo	Illinois	1,124

=== Rushing yards ===
Rank	Name	Team	Yards
1	Jim Grabowski	Illinois	1,258
2	Clinton Jones	Michigan State	900
3	Bob Apisa	Michigan State	715
4	Carl Ward	Michigan	639
5	Bob McKelvey	Northwestern	587

=== Receiving yards ===
Rank	Name	Team	Yards
1	Jack Clancy	Michigan	762
2	John Wright	Illinois	755
3	Gene Washington	Michigan State	719
4	Bill Malinchak	Indiana	699
5	Bob Hadrick	Purdue	562

=== Total yards ===
Rank	Name	Team	Yards
1	Bob Griese	Purdue	1,784
2	John Hankinson	Minnesota	1,623
3	Steve Juday	Michigan State	1,380
4	Jim Grabowski	Illinois	1,258
5	Fred Custardo	Illinois	1,244

=== Scoring ===
Rank	Name	Team	Points
1	Clinton Jones	Michigan State	72
2	Bob Apisa	Michigan State	60
3	John Kuzniewski	Purdue	48
3	Bob McKelvey	Northwestern	48
3	Willard Sander	Ohio State	48

== Awards and honors ==
=== All-Big Ten honors ===
The following players were picked by the Associated Press (AP) and/or the United Press International (UPI) as first-team players on the 1965 All-Big Ten Conference football team.

Offense

Position	Name	Team	Selectors
Quarterback	Steve Juday	Michigan State	AP
Quarterback	Bob Griese	Purdue	UPI
Running back	Jim Grabowski	Illinois	AP, UPI [fb]
Running back	Clinton Jones	Michigan State	AP, UPI [hb]
Running back	Carl Ward	Michigan	AP, UPI [hb]
End	Gene Washington	Michigan State	AP, UPI
End	Bob Hadrick	Purdue	AP
Tackle	Tom Mack	Michigan	AP, UPI
Tackle	Karl Singer	Purdue	AP, UPI
Guard	John Niland	Iowa	AP, UPI
Guard	Doug Van Horn	Ohio State	AP, UPI
Center	Larry Kaminski	Purdue	AP
Center	Ray Pryor	Ohio State	UPI

Defense

Position	Name	Team	Selectors
Defensive end	Aaron Brown	Minnesota	AP, UPI [offense]
Defensive end	Bubba Smith	Michigan State	AP, UPI
Defensive end	David Long	Iowa	UPI
Defensive tackle	Bill Yearby	Michigan	AP, UPI
Defensive tackle	Jerry Shay	Purdue	AP, UPI
Defensive guard	Harold Lucas	Michigan State	UPI
Linebacker	Dwight Kelly	Ohio State	AP, UPI
Linebacker	Don Hansen	Illinois	AP, UPI
Linebacker	Ron Goovert	Michigan State	AP
Defensive back	Rich Volk	Michigan	AP, UPI [s]
Defensive back	George Webster	Michigan State	AP, UPI [lb]
Defensive back	Ron Acks	Illinois	AP
Defensive back	John Fill	Ohio State	AP
Defensive back	Don Japinga	Michigan State	UPI [hb]
Defensive back	Charles King	Purdue	UPI [hb]

=== All-American honors ===
At the end of the 1965 season, six Big Ten players secured consensus first-team honors on the 1965 College Football All-America Team. The Big Ten's consensus All-Americans were:

Position	Name	Team	Selectors
Running back	Jim Grabowski	Illinois	AFCA, AP, CP, FWAA, NEA, UPI, FN, Time, TSN, WCFF
Defensive end	Aaron Brown	Minnesota	AP, FWAA, NEA, UPI, FN, Time, TSN, WCFF
Quarterback	Bob Griese	Purdue	AFCA, CP, NEA, UPI, FN, WCFF
Defensive back	George Webster	Michigan State	AFCA, AP, NEA, UPI, FN, WCFF
Defensive tackle	Bill Yearby	Michigan	AFCA, NEA, UPI, Time, TSN, WCFF
Defensive end	Bubba Smith	Michigan State	AFCA, UPI, WCFF

Other Big Ten players who were named first-team All-Americans by at least one selector were:

Position	Name	Team	Selectors
Offensive end	Gene Washington	Michigan State	CP, FN
Offensive tackle	Karl Singer	Purdue	AP
Offensive guard	Doug Van Horn	Ohio State	AFCA, UPI
Offensive guard	John Niland	Iowa	Time, TSN
Quarterback	Steve Juday	Michigan State	AP
Running back	Clinton Jones	Michigan State	FWAA
Defensive tackle	Jerry Shay	Purdue	AFCA, FN
Middle guard	Harold Lucas	Michigan State	NEA
Linebacker	Ike Kelley	Ohio State	AP, UPI, FN [center]
Linebacker	Ron Goovert	Michigan State	FWAA

=== Other awards ===
The 1965 Heisman Trophy was awarded to Mike Garrett of USC. Three Big Ten players finished among the top 10 in the voting: Illinois fullback Jim Grabowski (third); Michigan State quarterback Steve Juday (sixth); and Purdue quarterback Bob Griese (eighth).

== 1966 NFL draft ==
The following Big Ten players were among the first 100 picks in the 1966 NFL draft:

Name	Position	Team	Round	Overall pick
Tom Mack	Offensive tackle	Michigan	1	2
Randy Beisler	Defensive end	Indiana	1	4
John Niland	Offensive guard	Iowa	1	5
Jerry Shay	Offensive tackle	Purdue	1	7
Jim Grabowski	Running back	Illinois	1	9
Gale Gillingham	Offensive tackle	Minnesota	1	13
Harold Lucas	Tackle	Michigan State	2	23
Al Randolph	Running back	Iowa	3	37
Tom Barrington	Running back	Ohio State	3	38
Bill Malinchak	Wide receiver	Indiana	3	39
Don Hansen	Linebacker	Illinois	3	42
Dave Long	Defensive end	Iowa	3	43
Doug Van Horn	Guard	Ohio State	4	55
Ron Acks	Defensive back	Illinois	4	57
Gary Snook	Quarterback	Iowa	4	58
Steve Smith	Wide receiver	Michigan	5	71
Jack Clancy	Wide receiver	Michigan	5	73
Bill Briggs	Defensive end	Iowa	5	75
