= 1966 Minnesota Vikings season =

NFL team season

- General manager: Jim Finks
- Head coach: Norm Van Brocklin
- Home stadium: Metropolitan Stadium

Results
- Record: 4–9–1
- Division place: T-6th NFL Western
- Playoffs: Did not qualify
- All-Pros: C Mick Tingelhoff (1st team)
- Pro Bowlers: C Mick Tingelhoff; T Grady Alderman; E Paul Flatley; G Milt Sunde

Uniform
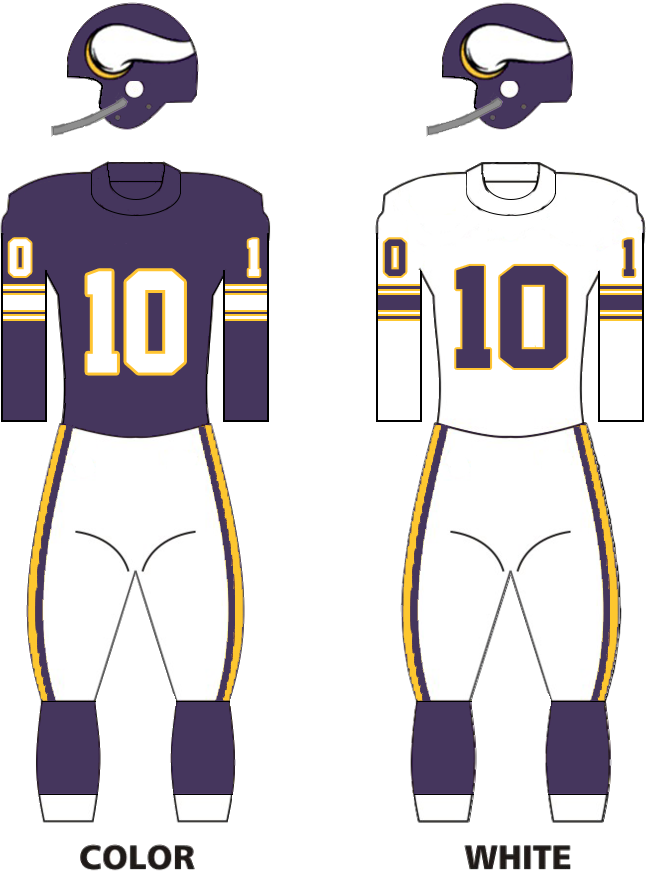

The 1966 season was the Minnesota Vikings' sixth in the National Football League. Sixth-year head coach Norm Van Brocklin resigned at the end of the season, after the team finished with a 4–9–1 record.

== Offseason ==
=== 1966 draft ===
1966 Minnesota Vikings Draft
Draft order		Player name	Position	College	Notes
Round	Selection	Player name	Position	College	Notes
1	6	Jerry Shay	Offensive tackle	Purdue	
2	27	Jim Lindsey	Running back	Arkansas	
3	42	Don Hansen	Linebacker	Illinois	
4	57	Ron Acks	Safety	Illinois	
5	72	Doug Davis	Offensive tackle	Kentucky	
5	76	Bob Hall	Defensive back	Brown	from Bears (Note: The Vikings traded G Palmer Pyle to the Bears in exchange for a fifth-round selection (76th overall).)
6	83	Wilbur Aylor	Offensive tackle	Southwest Texas State	from Steelers, via Giants (Note: The Vikings trade LB Bill Swain to the Giants in exchange for a sixth-round selection (83rd overall).)
6	87	Traded to the Detroit Lions (Note: The Vikings traded their sixth-round selection (87th overall) and a 1965 seventh-round selection (92nd overall) to the Lions in exchange for DT Mike Bundra and end Larry Vargo.)			
7	106	Bob Meers	End	UMass	
8	120	Traded to the Baltimore Colts (Note: The Vikings traded their eighth-round selection (120th overall) and LB John Campbell to the Colts in exchange for OT Larry Kramer.)			
9	134	Ron Green	Wide receiver	North Dakota	
10	148	Traded to the Detroit Lions (Note: The Vikings traded their 10th-round selection (148th overall) to the Lions in exchange for DB Gary Lowe.)			
11	162	Stan Quintana	Defensive back	New Mexico	
12	181	Bob Petrella	Defensive back	Tennessee	
13	195	Larry Martin	Offensive tackle	San Diego State	
14	209	Howard Twilley	Wide receiver	Tulsa	
15	223	Hugh Wright	Running back	Adams State	
16	237	Jim Williams	Defensive end	Arkansas	
17	256	Monroe Beard	Running back	Virginia Union	
18	270	Dale Greco	Defensive tackle	Illinois	
19	284	Jesse Stokes	Running back	Corpus Christi	
20	298	Traded to the Philadelphia Eagles (Note: The Vikings traded their 20th-round selection (298th overall) to the Eagles in exchange for HB Billy Ray Barnes.)			

=== Undrafted free agents ===
1966 undrafted free agents of note
Player	Position	College
Chuck Arrobio	Tackle	USC
Joe Chapman	Wide receiver	Idaho
Jim Ferrozzo	Defensive tackle	Minnesota
Vern Johnson	Center	Wiley
John McSwaney	Guard	Parsons
Bob Miranda	Fullback	Santa Clara
Sheldon Moomaw	Defensive end	Tulsa
Sam Shivers	Linebacker	Alcorn A&M
Jim Vellone	Guard	USC
Donnie Wallace	Cornerback	Alcorn A&M

== Roster ==
1966 Minnesota Vikings roster
Quarterbacks (QB): 17 Bob Berry; 10 Fran Tarkenton; 15 Ron Vander Kelen; Running backs (RB): 30 Bill Brown; 24 Phil King; 21 Jim Lindsey; 41 Dave Osborn; 43 Jeff Williams; Wide receivers (WR): 85 Paul Flatley; 28 Tom Hall; 19 Lance Rentzel; Tight ends (TE): 40 Preston Carpenter; 83 John Powers	Offensive linemen (OL): 67 Grady Alderman T; 61 Larry Bowie G; 71 Doug Davis T; 64 Milt Sunde G; 72 Archie Sutton T; 53 Mick Tingelhoff C; 63 Jim Vellone G; Defensive linemen (DL): 76 Paul Dickson DT; 81 Carl Eller DE; 77 Gary Larsen DT; 70 Jim Marshall DE; 73 Jerry Shay DT; 74 Mike Tilleman DT	Linebackers (LB): 55 Don Hansen OLB/MLB; 36 John Kirby OLB; 54 Bob Schmitz MLB; 51 Dave Tobey OLB; 60 Roy Winston OLB; Defensive backs (DB): 37 Mike Fitzgerald CB; 49 Dale Hackbart FS; 22 Jeff Jordan FS; 29 Karl Kassulke SS; 46 Earsell Mackbee CB; 44 George Rose CB; Special teams (ST): 14 Fred Cox K; 39 Bobby Walden P	Reserve: 79 Chuck Arrobio T (IR); 86 Hal Bedsole TE (IR); 66 Ken Byers G (IR); 20 Tommy Mason RB (IR); 82 Jim Phillips WR (IR); 45 Ed Sharockman CB (IR); 59 Lonnie Warwick LB (IR); Rookies in italics

== Preseason ==
Game	Date	Opponent	Result	Record	Venue	Attendance
1	August 6	Detroit Lions	T 6–6	0–0–1	Tulane Stadium (New Orleans, LA)	38,229
2	August 13	Pittsburgh Steelers	W 35–6	1–0–1	Multnomah Stadium Portland, OR)	21,228
3	August 20	Los Angeles Rams	W 24–10	2–0–1	Metropolitan Stadium	40,270
4	August 26	Washington Redskins	W 30–27	3–0–1	Cleveland Stadium (Cleveland, OH)	83,418
5	September 2	at Dallas Cowboys	L 24–28	3–1–1	Cotton Bowl	58,316

== Regular season ==
=== Schedule ===
Week	Date	Opponent	Result	Record	Venue	Attendance
1	September 11	at San Francisco 49ers	T 20–20	0–0–1	Kezar Stadium	29,312
2	September 18	Baltimore Colts	L 23–38	0–1–1	Metropolitan Stadium	47,426
3	September 25	at Dallas Cowboys	L 17–28	0–2–1	Cotton Bowl	64,116
4	October 2	Chicago Bears	L 10–13	0–3–1	Metropolitan Stadium	47,426
5	Bye					
6	October 16	Los Angeles Rams	W 35–7	1–3–1	Metropolitan Stadium	47,426
7	October 23	at Baltimore Colts	L 17–20	1–4–1	Memorial Stadium	60,238
8	October 30	San Francisco 49ers	W 28–3	2–4–1	Metropolitan Stadium	45,077
9	November 6	at Green Bay Packers	W 20–17	3–4–1	Lambeau Field	50,861
10	November 13	Detroit Lions	L 31–32	3–5–1	Metropolitan Stadium	43,939
11	November 20	at Los Angeles Rams	L 6–21	3–6–1	Los Angeles Memorial Coliseum	38,775
12	November 27	Green Bay Packers	L 16–28	3–7–1	Metropolitan Stadium	47,426
13	December 4	Atlanta Falcons	L 13–20	3–8–1	Metropolitan Stadium	37,117
14	December 11	at Detroit Lions	W 28–16	4–8–1	Tiger Stadium	43,022
15	December 18	at Chicago Bears	L 28–41	4–9–1	Wrigley Field	45,191

- A bye week was necessary as the league had expanded to an odd number (15) of teams (Atlanta); one team was idle each week.

== Standings ==
NFL Western Conference
	W	L	T	PCT	CONF	PF	PA	STK
Green Bay Packers	12	2	0	.857	10–2	335	163	W5
Baltimore Colts	9	5	0	.643	7–5	314	226	W1
Los Angeles Rams	8	6	0	.571	6–6	289	212	L1
San Francisco 49ers	6	6	2	.500	5–5–2	320	325	L1
Chicago Bears	5	7	2	.417	4–6–2	234	272	W1
Detroit Lions	4	9	1	.308	3–8–1	206	317	L3
Minnesota Vikings	4	9	1	.308	4–7–1	292	304	L1

Note: Tie games were not officially counted in the standings until 1972.

== Statistics ==
=== Team leaders ===
Category	Player(s)	Value
Passing yards	Fran Tarkenton	2,561
Passing touchdowns	Fran Tarkenton	17
Rushing yards	Bill Brown	829
Rushing touchdowns	Bill Brown	6
Receiving yards	Paul Flatley	777
Receiving touchdowns	Preston Carpenter	4
Points	Fred Cox	88
Kickoff return yards	Mike Fitzgerald	301
Punt return yards	Ed Sharockman	95
Interceptions	Dale Hackbart	5
Sacks	Jim Marshall	7

Note that sack totals from 1960 to 1981 are considered unofficial by the NFL.

=== League rankings ===
Category	Total yards	Yards per game	NFL rank (out of 15)
Passing offense	2,548	182.0	7th
Rushing offense	2,091	149.4	3rd
Total offense	4,639	331.4	4th
Passing defense	2,236	159.7	2nd
Rushing defense	1,686	120.4	7th
Total defense	3,922	280.1	5th
