= 1965 Illinois Fighting Illini football team =

American college football season

1965 Illinois Fighting Illini football
- Conference: Big Ten Conference
- Record: 6–4 (4–3 Big Ten)
- Head coach: Pete Elliott (6th season)
- MVP: Jim Grabowski
- Captains: Jim Grabowski; Don Hansen
- Home stadium: Memorial Stadium

1965 Big Ten Conference football standings
	Conf.					Overall
Team	W		L		T	W		L		T
No. 2 Michigan State $	7	–	0	–	0	10	–	1	–	0
Ohio State	6	–	1	–	0	7	–	2	–	0
Purdue	5	–	2	–	0	7	–	2	–	1
Minnesota	5	–	2	–	0	5	–	4	–	1
Illinois	4	–	3	–	0	6	–	4	–	0
Northwestern	3	–	4	–	0	4	–	6	–	0
Michigan	2	–	5	–	0	4	–	6	–	0
Wisconsin	2	–	5	–	0	2	–	7	–	1
Indiana	1	–	6	–	0	2	–	8	–	0
Iowa	0	–	7	–	0	1	–	9	–	0
$ – Conference champion; Rankings from AP Poll

The 1965 Illinois Fighting Illini football team represented the University of Illinois as a member of the Big Ten Conference during the 1965 Big Ten season. In their sixth season under head coach Pete Elliott, the Fighting Illini compiled a 6–4 (4–3 in conference games), finished in fifth place in the Big Ten, and outscored opponents 235 to 118.

Fullback Jim Grabowski led the Big Ten with 252 rushing carries and 1,258 rushing yards. He won the Chicago Tribune Silver Football as the most valuable player in the Big Ten and was a consensus pick for the 1965 All-America team. Grabowski, linebacker Don Hansen, and defensive back Ron Acks received first-team honors on the 1965 All-Big Ten Conference football team.

The team's statistical leaders included quarterback Fred Custardo (1,124 passing yards, 52.9% completion percentage) and wide receiver John Wright (47 receptions for 755 yards).

The team played its home games at Memorial Stadium in Champaign, Illinois.

== Schedule ==
Date	Opponent	Site	Result	Attendance	Source
September 18	Oregon State*	Memorial Stadium; Champaign, IL	L 10–12	34,149	
September 25	SMU*	Memorial Stadium; Champaign, IL	W 42–0	45,175	
October 2	at No. 9 Michigan State	Spartan Stadium; East Lansing, MI	L 12–22	71,237	
October 9	at Ohio State	Ohio Stadium; Columbus, OH (Illibuck)	L 14–28	83,712	
October 16	Indiana	Memorial Stadium; Champaign, IL (rivalry)	W 34–13	61,257	
October 23	Duke*	Memorial Stadium; Champaign, IL	W 28–14	47,077	
October 30	No. 6 Purdue	Memorial Stadium; Champaign, IL (rivalry)	W 21–0	59,507	
November 6	Michigan	Memorial Stadium; Champaign, IL (rivalry)	L 3–23	50,136	
November 13	at Wisconsin	Camp Randall Stadium; Madison, WI	W 51–0	55,192	
November 20	at Northwestern	Dyche Stadium; Evanston, IL (rivalry)	W 20–6	41,348	
*Non-conference game; Rankings from AP Poll released prior to the game; Source:

== Awards and honors ==
- Jim Grabowski (fullback)
  - Chicago Tribune Silver Football
  - Consensus All-American

== 1966 NFL draft ==
Player	Round	Pick	Position	Club
Jim Grabowski	1	9	Running back	Green Bay Packers
Don Hansen	3	42	Linebacker	Minnesota Vikings
Ron Acks	4	57	Defensive end	Minnesota Vikings
Sam Price	16	240	Defensive end	New York Giants
Gary Eickman	17	254	Defensive end	New York Giants
Kai Anderson	18	268	Defensive end	New York Giants
Dale Greco	18	270	Defensive tackle	Minnesota Vikings

- Jim Grabowski was also the first pick overall in the 1966 American Football League draft. He was the first ever draft pick of the Miami Dolphins.
