= 1965 Ohio State Buckeyes football team =

American college football season

1965 Ohio State Buckeyes football
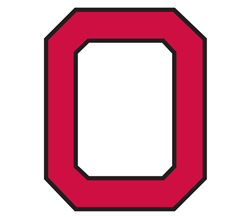
- Conference: Big Ten Conference

Ranking
- Coaches: No. 11
- Record: 7–2 (6–1 Big Ten)
- Head coach: Woody Hayes (15th season)
- MVP: Doug Van Horn
- Captains: Ike Kelley; Greg Lashutka
- Home stadium: Ohio Stadium

1965 Big Ten Conference football standings
	Conf.					Overall
Team	W		L		T	W		L		T
No. 2 Michigan State $	7	–	0	–	0	10	–	1	–	0
Ohio State	6	–	1	–	0	7	–	2	–	0
Purdue	5	–	2	–	0	7	–	2	–	1
Minnesota	5	–	2	–	0	5	–	4	–	1
Illinois	4	–	3	–	0	6	–	4	–	0
Northwestern	3	–	4	–	0	4	–	6	–	0
Michigan	2	–	5	–	0	4	–	6	–	0
Wisconsin	2	–	5	–	0	2	–	7	–	1
Indiana	1	–	6	–	0	2	–	8	–	0
Iowa	0	–	7	–	0	1	–	9	–	0
$ – Conference champion; Rankings from AP Poll

The 1965 Ohio State Buckeyes football team was an American football represented the Ohio State University as a member of the Big Ten Conference during the 1965 Big Ten season. In their 15th year under head coach Woody Hayes, the Buckeyes compiled a 7–2 record (6–1 in conference games), finished in second place in the Big Ten, and outscored opponents by a total of 156 to 118. They lost to conference champion Michigan State by a 32–7 score. They were ranked No. 11 in the final UPI poll.

The team's statistical leaders included quarterback Don Unverferth (1,061 passing yards, 51.8% completion percentage), halfback Tom Barrington (530 rushing yards, 4.0 yards per carry), halfback Bo Rein (29 receptions for 328 yards), and Willard Sander (eight touchdowns). Four Ohio State players received first-team honors on the 1965 All-Big Ten Conference football team: offensive guard Doug Van Horn (AP-1, UPI-1); linebacker Ike Kelley (AP-1, UPI-1); center Ray Pryor (UPI-1); and defensive back John Fill (AP-1).

The team played its home games at Ohio Stadium in Columbus, Ohio.

== Schedule ==
Date	Time	Opponent	Site	TV	Result	Attendance	Source
September 25	1:30 p.m.	North Carolina*	Ohio Stadium; Columbus, OH		L 3–14	80,182	
October 2	3:30 p.m.	at Washington*	Husky Stadium; Seattle, WA	NBC	W 23–21	52,500	
October 9	1:30 p.m.	Illinois	Ohio Stadium; Columbus, OH (Illibuck)		W 28–14	83,712	
October 16	1:30 p.m.	at No. 4 Michigan State	Spartan Stadium; East Lansing, MI		L 7–32	75,288	
October 23	2:30 p.m.	at Wisconsin	Camp Randall Stadium; Madison, WI		W 20–10	65,269	
October 30	1:30 p.m.	Minnesota	Ohio Stadium; Columbus, OH		W 11–10	84,359	
November 6	1:30 p.m.	Indiana	Ohio Stadium; Columbus, OH		W 17–10	83,863	
November 13	1:30 p.m.	Iowa	Ohio Stadium; Columbus, OH		W 38–0	84,116	
November 20	1:00 p.m.	at Michigan	Michigan Stadium; Ann Arbor, MI (rivalry)	NBC	W 9–7	77,733	
*Non-conference game; Rankings from AP Poll released prior to the game; All times are in Eastern time; Source:

== Game summaries ==
=== North Carolina ===
Team	1	2	3	4	Total
• North Carolina	7	0	0	7	14
Ohio State	0	3	0	0	3

- Date: September 25
- Location: Ohio Stadium
- Game attendance: 80,182
- Game weather: Clear, wind SE 5mph, 68 °F (20 °C)

Scoring summary
Q1	11:09	NC	Talbott 5 yard run (Talbott kick)	NC 0–7
Q2	14:52	OSU	Funk 26 yard field goal	NC 3–7
Q4	0:56	NC	Talbott 48 yard run (Talbott kick)	NC 3–14

=== Washington ===
Team	1	2	3	4	Total
• Ohio State	0	14	6	3	23
Washington	7	6	8	0	21

- Date: September 2
- Location: U.W. Stadium, Seattle, WA
- Game attendance: 52,500
- Game weather: wind SE 4 mph, 60 °F (16 °C)
- Television network: NBC

Scoring summary
Q1	9:25	WASH	Medved 1 yard run (Medved kick)	WASH 7–0
Q2	14:57	OSU	Sander 2 yard run (Funk kick)	TIED 7–7
Q2	8:23	OSU	Barrington 1 yard run (Funk kick)	OSU 7–14
Q2	2:55	WASH	Moore 6 yard run (rush failed)	OSU 13–14
Q3	8:38	WASH	Moore 3 yard run (Hullin pass to Kramer, good)	WASH 21–14
Q3	3:36	OSU	Fontes 5 yard run (kick failed)	WASH 21–20
Q4	0:59	OSU	Funk 27 yard field goal	OSU 21–23

=== Illinois ===
Team	1	2	3	4	Total
Illinois	7	0	0	7	14
• Ohio State	0	21	7	0	28

- Date: September 9
- Location: Ohio Stadium, Columbus, OH
- Game attendance: 83,712
- Game weather: Rain, wind WSW 15-20 mph, 54 °F (12 °C)

Scoring summary
Q1	7:39	ILL	Pinder 4 yard run (Custardo kick)	ILL 0–7
Q2	8:14	OSU	Sander 3 yard run (Funk kick)	TIED 7–7
Q2	3:06	OSU	Barrington 12 yard run (Funk kick)	OSU 14–7
Q2	0:41	OSU	Barrington 3 yard run (Funk kick)	OSU 21–7
Q3	5:12	OSU	Barrington 1 yard run (Funk kick)	OSU 28–7
Q4	3:26	ILL	Bess 5 yard run (Custardo kick)	OSU 28-14

=== Michigan State ===
Team	1	2	3	4	Total
Ohio State	0	0	0	7	7
• Michigan State	7	0	5	20	32

- Date: October 16
- Location: Spartan Stadium, East Lansing, MI
- Game attendance: 75,288
- Game weather: Fair, wind 9 mph, 67 °F (19 °C)

Scoring summary
Q1	12:24	MSU	Jones 80 yard run (Kenney kick)	MSU 0–7
Q3	2:10	MSU	Kenney 35 yard field goal	MSU 0–10
Q3	1:24	MSU	Unverferth tackled for a safety by Goovert	MSU 0–12
Q4	11:40	MSU	Juday 12 yard pass to Jones (run failed)	MSU 0–18
Q4	11:08	OSU	Unverferth 64 yard pass to Fontes (Funk kick)	MSU 7–18
Q4	4:36	MSU	Apisa 1 yard run (Kenney kick)	MSU 7–25
Q4	0:00	MSU	Lowther 6 yard run (Kenney kick)	MSU 7–32

=== Wisconsin ===
Team	1	2	3	4	Total
• Ohio State	17	0	0	3	20
Wisconsin	3	0	7	0	10

- Date: October 23
- Location: Camp Randall Stadium, Madison, WI
- Game attendance: 65,269
- Game weather: Cold, wind N 20-30, 42 °F (6 °C)

Scoring summary
Q1	12:28	WIS	Pinnow 35 yard field goal	WIS 0–3
Q2	12:29	OSU	Sander 2 yard run (Funk kick)	OSU 7–3
Q2	7:06	OSU	Sander 1 yard run (Funk kick)	OSU 14–3
Q2	0:52	OSU	Funk 19 yard field goal	OSU 17–3
Q3	1:37	WIS	Burt 12 yard pass to Jung (Kaye kick)	OSU 17–10
Q4	9:56	OSU	Funk 44 yard field goal	OSU 20–10

=== Minnesota ===
This was the first matchup between Ohio State and Minnesota in 15 years, last meeting during the 1950 season.

Team	1	2	3	4	Total
Minnesota	7	0	3	0	10
• Ohio State	0	8	0	3	11

- Date: October 30
- Location: Ohio Stadium
- Game attendance: 84,359
- Game weather: Clear, wind SW 10-15 mph, 60 °F (16 °C)

Scoring summary
Q1	10:04	MINN	Hankinson 1 yard run (Ramey kick)	MINN 0–7
Q2	8:30	OSU	Unverferth 25 yard pass to Adderly (Fontes run)	OSU 8–7
Q3	3:10	MINN	Ramey 32 yard field goal	MINN 8–10
Q4	1:17	OSU	Funk 18 yard field goal	OSU 11–10

=== Indiana ===
Team	1	2	3	4	Total
Indiana	0	10	0	0	10
• Ohio State	7	0	3	7	17

- Date: November 6
- Location: Ohio Stadium
- Game attendance: 83,863
- Game weather: Clear, 68 °F (20 °C)

Scoring summary
Q1	12:22	OSU	Sander 3 yard run (Funk kick)	OSU 7–0
Q2	9:14	IND	Kornowa 27 yard field goal	OSU 7–3
Q2	3:14	IND	Stavroff 15 yard run (Kornowa kick)	IND 7–10
Q3	4:34	OSU	Funk 26 yard field goal	TIED 10–10
Q4	5:29	OSU	Sander 2 yard run (Funk kick)	OSU 17–10

=== Iowa ===
Team	1	2	3	4	Total
Iowa	0	0	0	0	0
• Ohio State	7	10	21	0	38

- Date: November 13
- Location: Ohio Stadium
- Game attendance: 84,116
- Game weather: Clear, 49 °F (9 °C)

Scoring summary
Q1	6:33	OSU	Barrington 33 yard run (Funk kick)	OSU 7–0
Q2	14:47	OSU	Funk 26 yard field goal	OSU 10–0
Q2	0:59	OSU	Sander 4 yard run (Funk kick)	OSU 17–0
Q3	9:39	OSU	Barrington 3 yard run (Funk kick)	OSU 24–0
Q3	8:47	OSU	Unverferth 22 yard pass to Rein (Funk kick)	OSU 31–0
Q3	2:34	OSU	Sander 3 yard run (Funk kick)	OSU 38–0

=== Michigan ===
Team	1	2	3	4	Total
• Ohio State	6	0	0	3	9
Michigan	0	7	0	0	7

- Date: November 20
- Location: Michigan Stadium, Ann Arbor, MI
- Game attendance: 77,733
- Game weather: Cloudy

Scoring summary
1	5:09	OSU	Anders 5 yard pass from Unverferth (kick failed)	OSU 0-6
2	3:12	MICH	Fisher 2 yard run (Sygar kick)	MICH 7-6
4	1:15	OSU	Funk 28 yard field goal	OSU 7-9

== Coaching staff ==
- Woody Hayes - Head Coach - 15th year

== 1966 pro draftees ==
Player	Draft	Round	Pick	Position	NFL club
Tom Barrington	NFL	3	38	Running Back	Washington Redskins
Tom Barrington	AFL	16	142	Running Back	Kansas City Chiefs
Doug Van Horn	NFL	4	55	Guard	Detroit Lions
Doug Van Horn	AFL	5	39	Guard	Kansas City Chiefs
Ike Kelley	NFL	17	249	Linebacker	Philadelphia Eagles
Greg Lashutka	AFL	18	163	End	Buffalo Bills
