= 1965 Michigan Wolverines football team =

American college football season

1965 Michigan Wolverines football
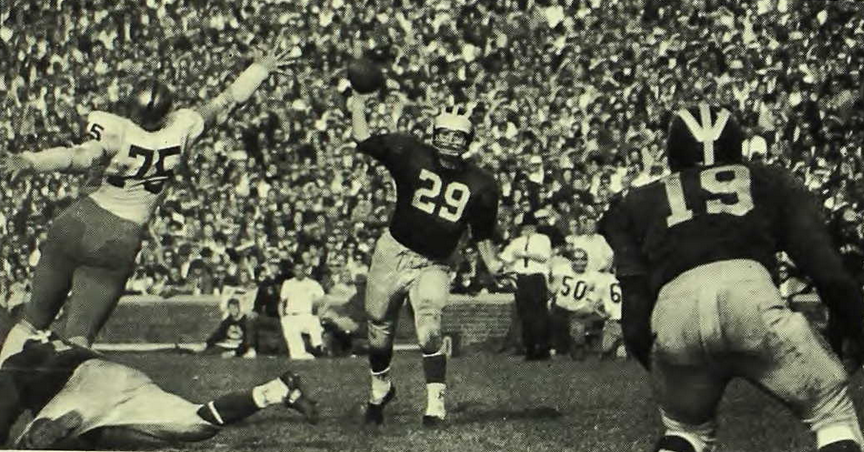
- Michigan quarterback Wally Gabler (No. 29) and halfback Carl Ward (No. 19)
- Conference: Big Ten Conference
- Record: 4–6 (2–5 Big Ten)
- Head coach: Bump Elliott (7th season)
- MVP: Bill Yearby
- Captain: Tom Cecchini
- Home stadium: Michigan Stadium

1965 Big Ten Conference football standings
	Conf.					Overall
Team	W		L		T	W		L		T
No. 2 Michigan State $	7	–	0	–	0	10	–	1	–	0
Ohio State	6	–	1	–	0	7	–	2	–	0
Purdue	5	–	2	–	0	7	–	2	–	1
Minnesota	5	–	2	–	0	5	–	4	–	1
Illinois	4	–	3	–	0	6	–	4	–	0
Northwestern	3	–	4	–	0	4	–	6	–	0
Michigan	2	–	5	–	0	4	–	6	–	0
Wisconsin	2	–	5	–	0	2	–	7	–	1
Indiana	1	–	6	–	0	2	–	8	–	0
Iowa	0	–	7	–	0	1	–	9	–	0
$ – Conference champion; Rankings from AP Poll

The 1965 Michigan Wolverines football team was an American football team that represented the University of Michigan in the 1965 Big Ten Conference football season. In its seventh year under head coach Bump Elliott, Michigan compiled a 4–6 record (2–5 against conference opponents), finished in seventh place in the Big Ten, and outscored opponents by a combined total of 185 to 161.

Ranked No. 4 in the preseason AP poll, the Wolverines were plagued by injuries throughout the season and lost close games to No. 7 Purdue (17–15, decided by two missed extra points), Minnesota (14–13, decided by a missed two-point conversion), and Ohio State (9–7, decided on a last-minute field goal after Michigan out-gained the Buckeyes).

Linebacker Tom Cecchini was the team captain, and defensive tackle Bill Yearby received the team's most valuable player award. Yearby was also a consensus first-team All-American. Four Michigan players received first-team All-Big Ten honors: Yearby, running back Carl Ward, offensive tackle Tom Mack, and defensive back Rich Volk.

The team's statistical leaders included quarterback Wally Gabler with 825 passing yards and 42 points scored, Carl Ward with 639 rushing yards, and right end Jack Clancy with 762 receiving yards.

== Schedule ==
Date	Opponent	Rank	Site	Result	Attendance	Source
September 18	at North Carolina*	No. 4	Kenan Memorial Stadium; Chapel Hill, NC	W 31–24	41,000	
September 25	California*	No. 4	Michigan Stadium; Ann Arbor, MI	W 10–7	81,417	
October 2	No. 10 Georgia*	No. 7	Michigan Stadium; Ann Arbor, MI	L 7–15	59,470	
October 9	No. 5 Michigan State		Michigan Stadium; Ann Arbor, MI (rivalry)	L 7–24	103,219	
October 16	No. 7 Purdue^{†}		Michigan Stadium; Ann Arbor, MI	L 15–17	85,905	
October 23	at Minnesota		Memorial Stadium; Minneapolis, MN (Little Brown Jug)	L 13–14	58,519	
October 30	Wisconsin		Michigan Stadium; Ann Arbor, MI	W 50–14	66,907	
November 6	at Illinois		Memorial Stadium; Champaign, IL (rivalry)	W 23–3	50,136	
November 13	at Northwestern		Dyche Stadium; Evanston, IL (rivalry)	L 22–34	40,007	
November 20	Ohio State		Michigan Stadium; Ann Arbor, MI (rivalry)	L 7–9	77,733	
*Non-conference game; ^{†}Homecoming; Rankings from AP Poll released prior to the game

== Season summary ==
=== Preseason ===
The 1964 Michigan Wolverines football team compiled a 9–1 record, won the Big Ten championship, and was ranked No. 4 in the final AP poll.

In January 1965, Michigan's players selected defensive end Tom Cecchini to be the captain of the 1965 team.

In April 1965, Bill Keating won the Meyer Morton Trophy as the player showing the greatest development in spring practice, and Rocky Rosema received the John Maulbetsch Scholarship, awarded to a freshman player "on the basis of need, scholarship, capacity, and desire for leadership and success."

Multiple starters returned from the 1964 team, including Cecchini, Tom Mack, Carl Ward, Jim Detwiler, Dave Fisher, and Bill Yearby. In addition, Barry Dehlin, Jack Clancy, and John Rowser returned to the team after missing all or most of the 1964 season due to injury.

In the Associated Press' annual preseason college football poll, Michigan received five first place ballots and was ranked fourth with 282 points, trailing Nebraska (311 points), Texas (292 points), and Notre Dame (282 points).

=== At North Carolina ===
Week 1: Michigan at North Carolina

Team	1	2	3	4	Total
• No. 4 Michigan	14	7	0	10	31
North Carolina	0	9	7	8	24

- Date: September 18
- Location: Chapel Hill, NC
- Game attendance: 41,000

Scoring summary
1	MICH	Wally Gabler 31-yard run (Dick Sygar kick)	MICH 7–0
1	MICH	Jim Detwiler 6-yard run (Sygar kick)	MICH 14–0
2	MICH	Detwiler 2-yard run (Sygar kick)	MICH 21–0
2	NC	Bill Darnall 52-yard interception return (pass incomplete)	MICH 21–6
2	NC	Danny Talbott 21-yard field goal	MICH 21–9
3	NC	John Atherton 12-yard pass from Talbott (Talbott kick)	MICH 21–16
4	MICH	Sygar 33-yard field goal	MICH 24–16
4	MICH	Jack Clancy 10-yard pass from Dick Vidmer (Sygar kick)	MICH 31–16
4	NC	Max Chapman 19-yard pass from Talbott (pass, Jeff Beaver to Atherton)	MICH 31–24

Michigan was ranked No. 4 in the pre-season AP poll. On September 18, 1965, the team opened its season on the road with a 31–24 victory over North Carolina. The game was played in "brutal, suffocating heat" that reached 100 degrees on the field with humidity near 80 per cent. Bump Elliott said after the game it felt like 186 degrees, "the hottest weather I've ever seen."

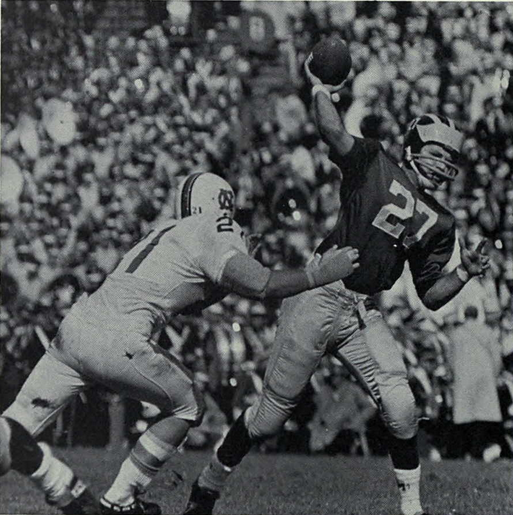
Dick Vidmer

Michigan took a 21–0 lead after the first 18 minutes of the game, scoring on a 31-yard touchdown run by quarterback Wally Gabler and two touchdown runs by halfback Jim Detwiler. As the game progressed, the heat slowed the Wolverines, as Bill Yearby, Tom Cecchini, Paul Johnson, and Dave Fisher all left the game with heat sickness. Detwiler and Rich Volk also left the game with knee injuries. The Tar Heels scored 16 unanswered points against the depleted Wolverines – a 53-yard interception return by Bill Darnall, a 21-yard field goal, and a 12-yard touchdown pass from Danny Talbott to John Atherton.

In the fourth quarter, Dick Vidmer replaced Gabler at quarterback and revitalized the offense. He led a drive that culminated in a 33-yard field goal by Dick Sygar and later threw a 10-yard pass to Steve Smith, the ball bouncing off Smith and into the hands of Jack Clancy for the game-clinching touchdown. North Carolina concluded the scoring with a 19-yard touchdown pass from Jeff Beaver to Max Chapman.

Michigan rushed for 255 yards in the game, including 50 yards by Detwiler, 48 by Sygar, 46 by Carl Ward, and 44 by Gabler. Quarterbacks Vidmer and Gabler combined to complete 6 of 12 passes for 74 yards and one interception.

=== California ===
Week 2: California at Michigan

Team	1	2	3	4	Total
California	0	0	7	0	7
• No. 4 Michigan	3	7	0	0	10

- Date: September 25
- Location: Ann Arbor, MI
- Game attendance: 81,417

Scoring summary
1	MICH	Dick Sygar 17-yard field goal	MICH 3–0
2	MICH	Dick Vidmer 1-yard run (Sygar kick)	MICH 10–0
4	CAL	Ted Parks 16-yard pass from Dan Berry (Sinclair kick)	MICH 10–7

On September 25, Michigan defeated California, 10–7, in its home opener before a crowd of 81,417. Jim Detwiler did not play due to a knee injury sustained in the North Carolina game.

Michigan took a 10–0 lead at halftime on a 17-yard field goal by Dick Sygar, set up by a Frank Nunley interception, and a one-yard touchdown run by quarterback Dick Vidmer.

Turnovers allowed California to keep the game close. Michigan fumbled five times (losing three) and threw two interceptions. In the third quarter, California narrowed the lead on a 16-yard touchdown pass from Dan Berry to Ted Parks.

In the fourth first quarter, the game nearly got away from the Wolverines when Vidmer turned the ball over as he pitched the ball into an empty backfield on a sweep play. Michigan forced California to punt, but the ball caromed off Rich Volk's chest as he tried to execute a fair catch. Cal recovered the fumble at the Wolverines' 30-yard line, then fumbled at the 12-yard line with 59 second remaining in the game. Paul Johnson recovered the loose ball, allowing the Wolverines to run out the clock.

Michigan totaled 223 rushing yards led by Carl Ward (75 yards), Dick Sygar (60 yards), and Dave Fisher (58 yards). Vidmer completed 8 of 14 passes for 103 yards. Jack Clancy caught six passes for 71 yards.

Following the game, Michigan dropped from No. 4 to No. 7 in the AP poll.

=== Georgia ===
Week 3: Georgia at Michigan

Team	1	2	3	4	Total
• No. 10 Georgia	3	3	0	9	15
No. 7 Michigan	0	7	0	0	7

- Date: October 2
- Location: Ann Arbor, MI
- Game attendance: 59,470

Scoring summary
1	UGA	Bobby Etter 34-yard field goal	GA 3–0
2	MICH	Tim Radigan 1-yard run (Dick Sygar kick)	MICH 7–3
2	UGA	Etter 44-yard field goal	MICH 7–6
4	UGA	Pat Hodgson 10-yard pass from Preston Ridlehuber (pass failed)	GA 12–7
4	UGA	Etter 31-yard field goal	GA 15–7

On October 2, No. 7 Michigan lost to No. 10 Georgia by a 15–7 score before a crowd of 59,470 at Michigan Stadium. The loss broke an eight-game winning streak for Michigan that dated back to October 24, 1964.

Michigan took a 7–6 halftime lead on a one-yard touchdown run by fullback Tim Radigan. Michigan's lead held until the final five minutes of the game. With 4:11 remaining, Georgia quarterback Preston Ridlehuber rolled out on an option play and threw a 10-yard touchdown pass to Pat Hodgson. Georgia tried for a two-point conversion but Michigan defender Dick Wells knocked down Ridlehuber's pass, and the Bulldogs led, 12–7. On the ensuing possession, Lynn Hughes intercepted a Dick Vidmer pass and returned it to Michigan's nine-yard line. Georgia kicker Bobby Etter concluded the scoring with his third field goal.

Michigan was limited to 128 rushing yards (led by Dave Fisher with 66 yards on 13 carries) and 107 passing yards (led by Vidmer with 75 yards on four-of-nine passing). Jack Clancy led the Wolverines' offense with five catches for 90 yards.

=== Michigan State ===
Week 4: Michigan State at Michigan

Team	1	2	3	4	Total
• No. 5 Michigan State	6	3	6	9	24
Michigan	0	7	0	0	7

- Date: October 9
- Location: Ann Arbor, MI
- Game attendance: 103,219

Scoring summary
1	MSU	Steve Juday 1-yard run (kick failed)	MSU 6–0
2	MICH	Wally Gabler 1-yard run (Dick Sygar kick)	MICH 7–6
2	MSU	Dick Kenney 20-yard field goal	MSU 9–7
3	MSU	Jones 10-yard run (run failed)	MSU 15–7
4	MSU	Kenney 35-yard field goal	MSU 18–7
4	MSU	Bob Apisa 39-yard run (kick failed)	MSU 24–7

On October 9, Michigan lost its annual rivalry game to No. 5 Michigan State by a 24–7 score. The game was played at Michigan Stadium before a crowd of 103,219.

Michigan State opened the scoring with a one-yard touchdown plunge by quarterback Steve Juday. Michigan responded with an 87-yard touchdown drive in the second quarter, capped by Wally Gabler's one-yard run. The Spartans added a 20-yard field goal by its barefoot kicker, Dick Kenney, and led 9–7 at halftime. Michigan State's first-half scores followed turnovers (a fumble recovery and an interception) by linebacker George Webster.

In the second half, Michigan played without its offensive stars, Jim Detwiler, Carl Ward, and Jack Clancy, each of whom sustained injuries in the game. The Spartans held the Wolverines scoreless, as the Michigan State offense added 15 points on two touchdowns (including a 39-yard run by Samoan fullback Bob Apisa) and a second field goal.

Michigan's running game limited to -38 rushing yards, including -50 yards by quarterback Dick Vidmer and two yards on seven carries for Carl Ward. With the run game stymied, Michigan turned to the air, completing 17 of 40 passes for 287 yards. Split end Steve Smith was the team's offensive leader with seven catches for 110 yards. Michigan gave up two interceptions and fumbled seven times, three resulting in turnovers.

=== Purdue ===
Week 5: Purdue at Michigan

Team	1	2	3	4	Total
• No. 7 Purdue	0	0	14	3	17
Michigan	0	6	6	3	15

- Date: October 16
- Location: Ann Arbor, MI
- Game attendance: 85,905

Scoring summary
2	MICH	Carl Ward 17-yard run (kick failed)	MICH 6–0
3	PUR	Jim Finley 24-yard pass from Bob Griese (Griese kick)	PUR 7–6
3	PUR	Jim Beirne 6-yard pass from Griese (Griese kick)	PUR 14–6
3	MICH	Jack Clancy 40-yard pass from Wally Gabler (run failed)	PUR 14–12
4	MICH	Sygar 18-yard field goal	MICH 15–14
4	PUR	Griese 35-yard field goal	PUR 17–15

On October 16, Michigan lost to No. 7 Purdue by a 17–15 score before a homecoming crowd of 85,905 at Michigan Stadium.

Michigan took a 6–0 lead at halftime on a 17-yard touchdown run by Carl Ward. Bob Griese led Purdue's comeback in the third quarter with touchdown passes of 24 yards to Jim Finley and six yards to Jim Beirne. For the game, Griese completed 22 of 38 passes for 273 yards.

Michigan narrowed the lead on a 40-yard touchdown pass from Wally Gabler to Jack Clancy later in the third quarter. In the fourth quarter, the Wolverines took a 15–14 lead on an 18-yard field goal by Dick Sygar. Griese then kicked a game-winning, 35-yard field goal.

For Michigan, Dave Fisher and Jack Clancy led the team with 89 rushing yards and 125 receiving yards, respectively.

=== At Minnesota ===
Week 6: Michigan at Minnesota

Team	1	2	3	4	Total
Michigan	7	0	0	6	13
• Minnesota	0	7	7	8	22

- Date: October 23
- Location: Minneapolis
- Game attendance: 58,519

Scoring summary
1	MICH	Dave Fisher 14-yard pass from Carl Ward (Dick Sygar kick)	MICH 7–0
3	MINN	Joe Holmberg 8-yard run (Ramey kick)	TIE 7–7
4	MINN	John Hankinson 1-yard run (Ramey kick)	MINN 14–7
4	MICH	Wally Gabler 4-yard run (pass failed)	MINN 14–13

On October 23, Michigan lost the annual Little Brown Jug rivalry game to Minnesota by a 14–13 score before a crowd of 58,519 at Memorial Stadium in Minneapolis.

Michigan took a 7–0 halftime lead on a 14-yard touchdown pass from Carl Ward to Dave Fisher. The Golden Gophers tied the game in the third quarter and took a 14–7 lead in the fourth quarter on one-yard touchdown run by quarterback John Hankinson.

With 2:46 remaining in the game, Michigan took possession at its own 48-yard line. Wally Gabler led that Wolverines on a seven-play, 52-yard drive capped by Gabler's four-yard touchdown run. Rather than kick for the extra point to tie the game, Michigan went for the two-point conversion to win. Gabler took the snap and rolled out to his left searching for an open receiver. With Minnesota defensive end Bob Bruggers rushing at him, Gabler tossed the ball in the direction of Steve Smith, but the pass fell incomplete.

=== Wisconsin ===
Week 7: Wisconsin at Michigan

Team	1	2	3	4	Total
Wisconsin	0	0	7	7	14
• Michigan	14	21	15	0	50

- Date: October 30
- Location: Ann Arbor, MI
- Game attendance: 66,907

Scoring summary
1	MICH	Jack Clancy 52-yard pass from Wally Gabler (Dick Sygar kick)	MICH 7–0
1	MICH	Gabler 1-yard run (Sygar kick)	MICH 14–0
2	MICH	Sygar 2-yard run (Sygar kick)	MICH 21–0
2	MICH	Dave Fisher 12-yard run (Sygar kick)	MICH 28–0
2	MICH	Gabler 5-yard run (Sygar kick)	MICH 35–0
3	MICH	Safety, Chuck Burt tackled in end zone	MICH 37–0
3	MICH	Clancy 26-yard pass from Sygar (Sygar kick)	MICH 44–0
3	MICH	Ernie Sharpe 1-yard run (kick failed)	MICH 50–0
3	WISC	Dick Schumitsch 83-yard kickoff return (Kaye kick)	MICH 50–7
3	WISC	John Boyajian 6-yard run (Kaye kick)	MICH 50–14

On October 30, Michigan defeated Wisconsin, 50–14, before a crowd of 66,907 at Michigan Stadium.

Michigan began the scoring on its first offensive play, 99 seconds into the game, with a 52-yard touchdown pass from Wally Gabler to Jack Clancy. After forcing a Wisconsin punt, Carl Ward ran 53 yards on Michigan's second play from scrimmage. The scoring continued unabated, and Michigan led, 50–0, with five and a half minutes left in the third quarter. With the game well in hand, the Wolverines emptied the bench and broke an "unofficial" school record by rotating 62 players into the game.

The Wolverines totaled 360 rushing yards led by Dave Fisher (106 yards) and Carl Ward (84 yards). Wally Gabler rushed for 24 yards and two touchdowns and completed 5 of 12 passes for 121 yards and a touchdown. Jack Clancy caught four passes for 105 yards and two touchdowns.

=== At Illinois ===
Week 8: Michigan at Illinois

Team	1	2	3	4	Total
• Michigan	7	10	6	10	33
Illinois	3	0	0	0	3

- Date: November 6
- Location: Champaign, IL
- Game attendance: 50,136

Scoring summary
1	MICH	Custardo 27-yard field goal	ILL 3–0
1	MICH	Carl Ward 6-yard run (Dick Sygar kick)	MICH 7–3
2	MICH	ward 1-yard run (Sygar kick)	MICH 14–3
2	MICH	Sygar 24-yard field goal	MICH 17–3
3	MICH	Wally Gabler 4-yard run (kick failed)	MICH 23–3

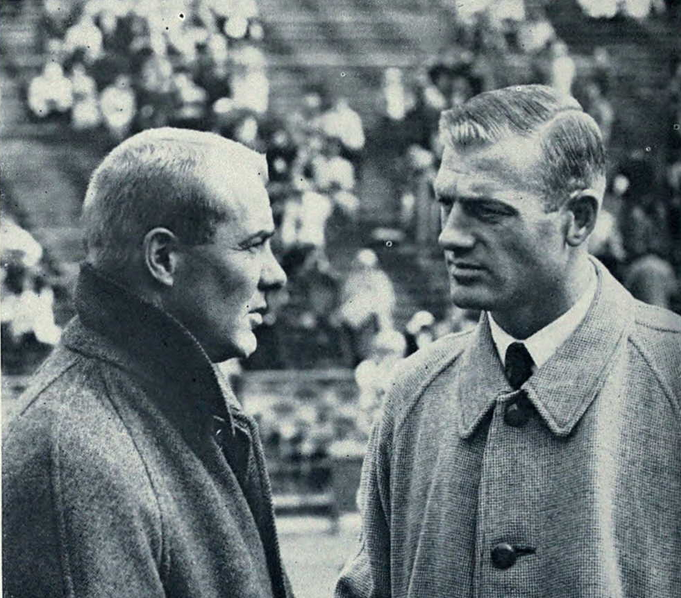
Bump and Pete Elliott

On November 6, Michigan defeated Illinois, 23–3, before a crowd of 50,136 at Memorial Stadium in Champaign, Illinois. The game was the sixth straight victory for Bump Elliott against his brother, Pete Elliott, head coach of Illinois since 1960.

The Wolverines out-gained Illinois by 423 yards to 254 yards. On the ground, the margin was 306 yards to 130 yards. Carl Ward led the way with 139 rushing yards and scored two touchdowns, the first on a one-yard run and the second on a five-yard pass from Wally Gabler. Gabler completed 7 of 12 passes for 124 yards and rushed for 68 yards and a touchdown.

=== At Northwestern ===
Week 9: Michigan at Northwestern

Team	1	2	3	4	Total
Michigan	7	3	6	6	22
• Northwestern	0	14	13	7	34

- Date: November 13
- Location: Evanston, IL
- Game attendance: 40,007

Scoring summary
1	MICH	Wally Gabler 3-yard run (Dick Sygar kick)	MICH 7–0
2	NW	Denny Boothe 1-yard run (Dickie kick)	TIE 7–7
2	MICH	Sygar 21-yard field goal	MICH 10–7
2	NW	Dick Smith 45-yard pass from Boothe (Dickie kick)	NW 14–10
3	NW	Ron Rector 9-yard run (kick failed)	NW 20–10
3	MICH	Jack Clancy 19-yard pass from Gabler (pass failed, illegal)	MICH 20–16
3	NW	Bob McKelvey 2-yard run (Dickie kick)	NW 27–16
4	NW	McKelvey 2-yard run (Dickie kick)	NW 34–16
4	MICH	Dave Fisher 3-yard plunge (pass failed)	NW 34–22

On November 13, Michigan lost to Northwestern, 34–22, before a crowd of 40,007 at Dyche Stadium in Evanston, Illinois.

On its first possession of the game, Michigan drove 88 yards in 21 plays, ending with Wally Gabler's three-yard touchdown run. In the second quarter, Northwestern quick-kicked 57 yards to Michigan's 12-yard line. Michigan was stopped on the ensuing drive, and Stan Kemp's punt from the end zone was blocked. Northwestern recovered the ball at Michigan's one-yard line and then scored on a one-yard plunge by quarterback Denny Boothe. Michigan retook the lead on a 21-yard field goal by Rick Sygar, but Booth completed a 45-yard touchdown pass to Dick Smith, giving Northwestern a 14–10 lead at halftime.

Northwestern drove 74 yards early in the third quarter, capped by a nine-yard touchdown run by Ron Rector. Michigan responded with a 19-yard touchdown pass to Jack Clancy. Late in the third quarter and early in the fourth, Northwestern fullback Bob McKelvey rushed for two touchdowns to extend the lead to 34–16. For the game, McKelvey rushed for 136 yards and two touchdowns on 35 carries. Michigan scored a final touchdown on a three-yard run by Dave Fisher.

=== Ohio State ===
Week 10: Ohio State at Michigan

Team	1	2	3	4	Total
• OhioState	6	0	0	3	9
Michigan	0	7	0	0	7

- Date: November 20
- Location: Ann Arbor, MI
- Game attendance: 77,733

Scoring summary
1	OSU	Billy Anders 4-yard pass from Don Unverferth (kick failed)	OSU 6–0
2	MICH	Dave Fisher 2-yard run (Dick Sygar kick)	MICH 7–6
4	OSU	Bob Funk 28-yard field goal	OSU 9–7

On November 20, Michigan lost its annual rivalry game with Ohio State by a 9–7 score before a crowd of 77,733 at Michigan Stadium.

In the first quarter, Ohio State took a 6–0 lead on a four-yard touchdown pass from Don Unverth to Billy Anders. Bob Funk missed the kick for extra point.

With 3:14 remaining in the first half, after an interception by Mike Bass, Michigan scored on a two-yard touchdown run by Dave Fisher. Dick Sygar's kick for extra point put Michigan ahead, 7–6. Michigan's lead held until the closing minutes.

With seven and a half minutes remaining, a punt by Stan Kemp pinned the Buckeyes at their own nine-yard line. Ohio State drove 74 yards in 15 plays, and with 75 second remaining in the game, Bob Funk kicked a 28-yard, game-winning field goal. In the final 75 seconds, Wally Gabler drove the Wolverines to the Ohio State 33-yard line. With 10 seconds remaining, Paul D'Eramo's kick for a long field goal failed.

Michigan out-gained Ohio State by 249 rushing yards 138 yards. Carl Ward and Dave Fisher led the Wolverines with 104 yards and 96 yards, respectively. In the air, the Buckeyes out-gained the Wolverines by 123 yards to 86 yards. Jack Clancy caught seven passes for 86 yards. Clancy ended the season with 52 receptions to set a single-season school record.

=== Post-season ===
==== All-American ====
Defensive tackle Bill Yearby was a consensus player on the 1965 All-America team. He received first-team honors from the United Press International (UPI), American Football Coaches Association, Newspaper Enterprise Association (NEA), Central Press Association, Sporting News, Time magazine, and the Walter Camp Football Foundation. He received second-team honors from the Associated Press (AP).

The only other Michigan player to receive All-America honors was offensive tackle Tom Mack who received second-team honors from the UPI and NEA.

==== All-Big Ten ====
Seven Michigan players received recognition from the AP and/or UPI on their 1965 All-Big Ten Conference football teams. They were:

- Bill Yearby (AP-1, UPI-1);
- Tom Mack (AP-1, UPI-1);
- Rich Volk (AP-1, UPI-1);
- Carl Ward (AP-1, UPI-1);
- Tom Cecchini (AP-2, UPI-2);
- Jack Clancy (UPI-2);
- Charles Kines (UPI-2)

==== Team honors ====
At Michigan's annual football bust, held on November 29 at Cobo Hall in Detroit, varsity letters were presented to 44 players. Team awards were presented as follows:

- Bill Yearby received the Lou Hyde award, having been selected by his teammates as Michigan's most valuable player.
- Pete Hollis received the Patterson Award as the team's outstanding academic senior with a 3.8 grade point average.

==== NFL draft ====
The 1965 NFL draft was held in New York City on November 27, 1965. The following Michigan players were drafted:

- Tom Mack - selected by the Los Angeles Rams in the first round, second overall pick.
- Steve Smith - selected by the San Francisco 49ers in the fifth round, 71st overall pick.
- Jack Clancy - selected by the St. Louis Cardinals in the fifth round, 73rd overall pick.
- Charles Kines - selected by the Chicago Bears in the 18th round, 272nd overall pick.

== Personnel ==
=== Letter winners ===
The following 44 players received varsity letters for their participation on the 1965 football team. Players starting at least five games are displayed in bold.

==== Offense ====
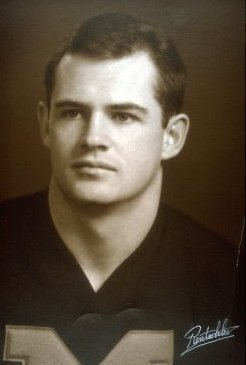
Jack Clancy

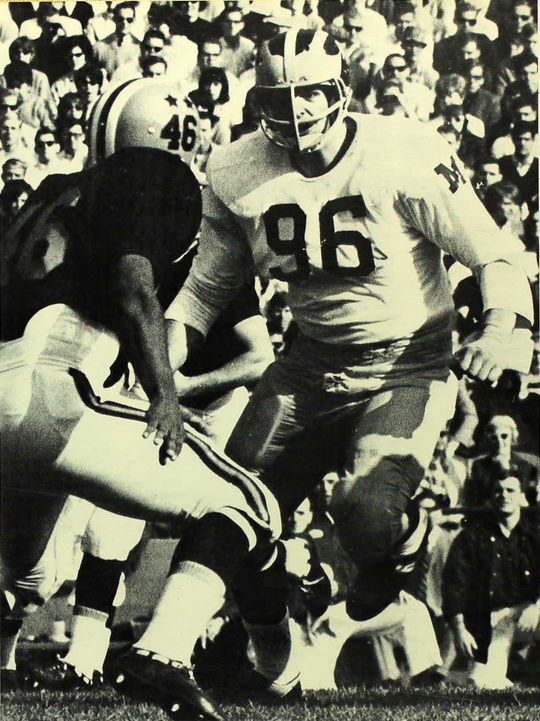
Tom Mack

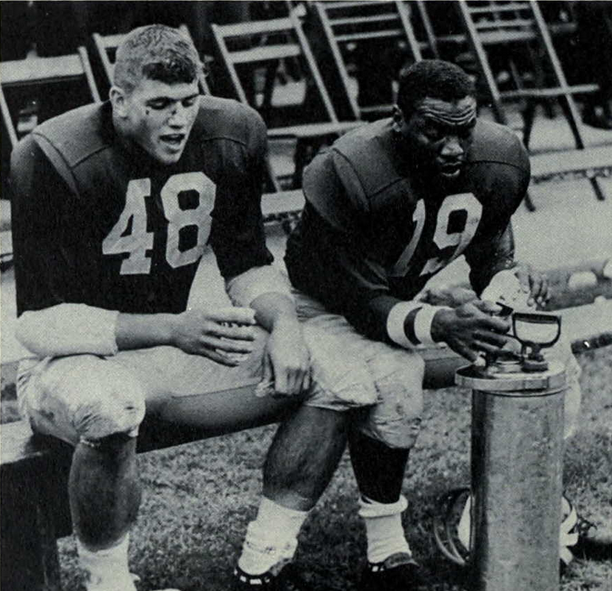
Jim Detwiler and Carl Ward

- **Donald Bailey**, 5'11", 198 pounds, junior, Greenberg, PA – started 8 games at right offensive guard
- Thomas Brigstock, 6'1", 197 pounds, senior, Battle Creek, MI - halfback
- **Jack Clancy**, 6'1", 195 pounds, junior, Detroit – started 7 games at right offensive end
- Floyd A. Day, 6'2", 202 pounds, senior, Canton, MI - guard
- **Joseph Dayton**, 6'2", 218 pounds, sophomore, Detroit – started 7 games at center
- Jim Detwiler, 6'3", 215 pounds, junior, Toledo, OH - started 3 games at left halfback
- Paul D'Eramo, 5'10", 212 pounds, sophomore, Youngstown, OH - started 2 games at center
- **Dave Fisher**, 5'10", 215 pounds, junior, Kettering, OH – started 5 games at fullback
- **Dennis Flanagan**, 6'2", 215 pounds, senior, Niles, OH - started 5 games at left offensive guard
- **Wally Gabler**, 6'2", 195 pounds, senior, Royal Oak, MI – started 5 games at quarterback
- Henry Hanna, 6'0", 220 pounds, junior, Youngstown, OH - started 1 game at left offensive guard
- William Hardy, 6'1", 225 pounds, junior, Detroit - started 2 games at right offensive tackle
- Peter Hollis, 6'0", 190 pounds, senior, Detroit - quarterback
- Bill Keating, 6'2", 226 pounds, senior, Chicago - started 2 games at left offensive guard
- Stanley Kemp, 6'1", 185 pounds, junior, Greenville, MI - started 1 game at right offensive end
- **Charles Kines**, 6'1", 238 pounds, senior, Niles, OH - started 8 games at left offensive tackle
- Craig Kirby, 6'2", 185 pounds, senior, Royal Oak, MI - end
- Louis Lee, 6'2", 192 pounds, junior, Willow Grove, PA -halfback
- **Tom Mack**, 6'3", 235 pounds, senior, Bucyrus, OH – started 7 games at right offensive tackle
- Dennis Morgan, 5'11", 222 pounds, sophomore, Phoenixville, PA - started 3 games at fullback
- Thomas Parkhill, 6'2", 205 pounds, senior, Ada, MI - end
- Raymond Phillips, 6'3", 222 pounds, sophomore, Evanston, IL - tackle
- Tim Radigan, 5'11", 206 pounds, junior, Lansing, MI - started 1 game at fullback
- John Rowser, 6'0", 182 pounds, junior, Detroit - halfback
- Gary Schick, 6'2", 215 pounds, senior, Grosse Pointe, MI - started 1 game at fullback
- Ernie Sharpe, 5'11", 190 pounds, sophomore, Palos Heights, IL - started 1 game at quarterback
- **Steve Smith**, 6'5", 229 pounds, senior, Park Ridge, IL – started 7 games at left offensive end
- Dick Sygar, 5'11", 180 pounds, junior, Niles, OH - started 4 games at left halfback, 1 game at safety, also handled kicking
- Dick Vidmer, 6'0", 184 pounds, Greensburg, PA - started 3 games at quarterback
- **Carl Ward**, 5'9", 177 pounds, junior, Cincinnati – started 7 games at right halfback

==== Defense ====
- **Mike Bass**, 6'0", 182 pounds, junior, Ypsilanti, MI – started 10 games at cornerback, 2 games at right offensive halfback, and 1 game at quarterback
- **Tom Cecchini**, 6'0", 194 pounds, senior, Detroit – started 10 games at linebacker
- Barry Dehlin, 5'11", 215 pounds, senior, Flushing, MI - started 1 game at defensive right guard
- **Jeff Hoyne**, 6'1", 190 pounds, senior, Chicago – started 7 games at defensive end (3 at left; 4 at right), 3 games at offensive end
- **Paul Johnson**, 6'0", 226 pounds, sophomore, Bay City, MI – started 7 games at right defensive tackle, 1 game at right offensive tackle
- **Bob Mielke**, 6'1", 218 pounds, junior, Chicago – started 10 games at defensive left guard, 2 games at offensive left guard
- **Frank Nunley**, 6'2", 222 pounds, junior, Belleville, MI – started 10 games at linebacker, 1 game at center, and 1 game at offensive right guard
- **Tom Pullen**, 6'4", 190 pounds, sophomore, Ottawa, Canada – started 6 games at right defensive end, 2 games at offensive end
- Rockey Rosema, 6'3", 208 pounds, sophomore, Grand Rapids, MI - started 2 games at defensive left end, 1 game at offensive tackle
- Charles Ruzicka, 6'1", 238 pounds, senior, Skokie, IL - started 3 games at defensive right tackle
- **Rich Volk**, 6'3", 190 pounds, junior, Wauseon, OH – started 10 games at cornerback, 4 games at offensive laeft halfback
- **Dick Wells**, 5'9", 178 pounds, senior, Grand Rapids, MI – started 9 games at safety, 1 game at offensive right halfback
- **Clayton Wilhite**, 6'4", 204 pounds, junior, Bay City, MI – started 5 games at left defensive end
- **Ken Wright**, 6'1", 215 pounds, junior, Bay City, MI – started 9 games at defensive right guard
- **Bill Yearby**, 6'3", 230 pounds, sophomore, Detroit – started 10 games at defensive left tackle, 1 game at left offensive tackle

=== Non-letter winners ===
- Dennis Brown, 6'2", 195 pounds, freshman, Lincoln Park, MI - end
- Tom Goss, 6'2", 217 pounds, sophomore, Knoxville, TN - tackle
- George Hoey, 5'10", 168 pounds, freshman, Flint, MI - halfback
- Ron Johnson, 6'0", 190 pounds, freshman, Detroit
- Tom Stincic, 6'3", 210 pounds, freshman, Cleveland - end

=== Coaching staff ===
Michigan's 1965 coaching, training, and support staff included the following persons.

- Head coach: Bump Elliott
- Assistant coaches:

- Don Dufek, Sr. - defensive backfield coach
- Dennis Fitzgerald - freshman coach
- Henry Fonde - offensive backfield coach
- Bob Hollway - defensive line coach
- Tony Mason - offensive line coach
- Jack Nelson - ends coach

- Trainer: Jim Hunt
- Manager: David Muir

== Statistical leaders ==
Michigan's individual statistical leaders for the 1965 season include those listed below.

=== Rushing ===
Player	Attempts	Net yards	Yards per attempt	Touchdowns
Carl Ward	112	639	5.7	2
Dave Fisher	139	575	4.1	3
Wally Gabler	85	265	3.1	7

=== Passing ===
Player	Attempts	Completions	Interceptions	Comp %	Yards	Yds/Comp	TD
Wally Gabler	125	58	2	46.4	825	14.2	4
Dick Vidmer	66	31	6	47.0	454	14.7	1

=== Receiving ===
Player	Receptions	Yards	Yds/Recp	TD	Long
Jack Clancy	52	762	14.7	5	
Steve C. Smith	21	314	14.9	0	39
Ernie Sharpe	4	62	15.5	0	

=== Kickoff returns ===
Player	Returns	Yards	Yds/Return	TD	Long
Carl Ward	10	193	19.3	0	27
Rick Volk	6	81	13.5	0	28
Dick Sygar	3	56	18.7	0	21

=== Punt returns ===
Player	Returns	Yards	Yds/Return	TD	Long
Dick Sygar	10	121	12.1	0	
Richard Wells	7	89	12.7	0	14
Rick Volk	10	73	7.3	0	16
