= 1965 Wisconsin Badgers football team =

American college football season

1965 Wisconsin Badgers football
- Conference: Big Ten Conference
- Record: 2–7–1 (2–5 Big Ten)
- Head coach: Milt Bruhn (10th season)
- MVP: Tom Brigham
- Captain: Dave Fronek
- Home stadium: Camp Randall Stadium

1965 Big Ten Conference football standings
	Conf.					Overall
Team	W		L		T	W		L		T
No. 2 Michigan State $	7	–	0	–	0	10	–	1	–	0
Ohio State	6	–	1	–	0	7	–	2	–	0
Purdue	5	–	2	–	0	7	–	2	–	1
Minnesota	5	–	2	–	0	5	–	4	–	1
Illinois	4	–	3	–	0	6	–	4	–	0
Northwestern	3	–	4	–	0	4	–	6	–	0
Michigan	2	–	5	–	0	4	–	6	–	0
Wisconsin	2	–	5	–	0	2	–	7	–	1
Indiana	1	–	6	–	0	2	–	8	–	0
Iowa	0	–	7	–	0	1	–	9	–	0
$ – Conference champion; Rankings from AP Poll

The 1965 Wisconsin Badgers football team was an American football team that represented the University of Wisconsin as a member of the Big Ten Conference during the 1965 Big Ten season. In their tenth year under head coach Milt Bruhn, the Badgers compiled a 2–7–1 record (2–5 in conference games), tied for seventh place in the Big Ten, and were outscored by a total of 291 to 81.

The Badgers gained an average of 139.4 passing yards and 58.1 rushing yards per game. On defense, they gave up an average of 102.0 passing yards and 229.7 rushing yards per game. The team's individual statistical leaders included: quarterback Charles Burt (1,143 passing yards); running back Tim Jankowski (271 rushing yards); and running back Dennis Lager (39 receptions for 396 yards).

Defensive back Tom Brigham was selected as the team's most valuable player. Dave Fronek was the team captain. Brigham received second-team honors from the Associated Press on the 1965 All-Big Ten Conference football team.

The Badgers played their home games at Camp Randall Stadium in Madison, Wisconsin.

== Schedule ==
Date	Opponent	Site	Result	Attendance	Source
September 18	Colorado*	Camp Randall Stadium; Madison, WI	T 0–0	45,914	
September 25	USC*	Camp Randall Stadium; Madison, WI	L 6–26	52,706	
October 2	Iowa	Camp Randall Stadium; Madison, WI (rivalry)	W 16–13	63,058	
October 9	at No. 2 Nebraska*	Memorial Stadium; Lincoln, NE (rivalry)	L 0–37	53,810	
October 16	at Northwestern	Dyche Stadium; Evanston, IL	W 21–7	44,444	
October 23	Ohio State^{†}	Camp Randall Stadium; Madison, WI	L 10–20	65,269	
October 30	at Michigan	Michigan Stadium; Ann Arbor, MI	L 14–50	66,907	
November 6	at Purdue	Ross–Ade Stadium; West Lafayette, IN	L 7–45	48,369	
November 13	Illinois	Camp Randall Stadium; Madison, WI	L 0–51	55,192	
November 20	at Minnesota	Memorial Stadium; Minneapolis, MN (rivalry)	L 7–42	50,847	
*Non-conference game; ^{†}Homecoming; Rankings from AP Poll released prior to the game; Source:

== Team players in the 1966 NFL draft ==
Player	Position	Round	Pick	NFL club
Tom Brigham	Defensive End	10	150	Detroit Lions
Bill Masselter	Tackle	13	192	Detroit Lions
