= 1965 Iowa Hawkeyes football team =

American college football season

1965 Iowa Hawkeyes football
- Conference: Big Ten Conference
- Record: 1–9 (0–7 Big Ten)
- Head coach: Jerry Burns (5th season)
- MVP: Dave Long
- Captain: Karl Noonan
- Home stadium: Iowa Stadium

1965 Big Ten Conference football standings
	Conf.					Overall
Team	W		L		T	W		L		T
No. 2 Michigan State $	7	–	0	–	0	10	–	1	–	0
Ohio State	6	–	1	–	0	7	–	2	–	0
Purdue	5	–	2	–	0	7	–	2	–	1
Minnesota	5	–	2	–	0	5	–	4	–	1
Illinois	4	–	3	–	0	6	–	4	–	0
Northwestern	3	–	4	–	0	4	–	6	–	0
Michigan	2	–	5	–	0	4	–	6	–	0
Wisconsin	2	–	5	–	0	2	–	7	–	1
Indiana	1	–	6	–	0	2	–	8	–	0
Iowa	0	–	7	–	0	1	–	9	–	0
$ – Conference champion; Rankings from AP Poll

The 1965 Iowa Hawkeyes football team was an American football team that represented the University of Iowa as a member of the Big Ten Conference during the 1965 Big Ten football season. In their fifth and final year under head coach Jerry Burns, the Hawkeyes compiled a 1–9 record (0–7 in conference game), finished in last place in the Big Ten, and were outscored by a total of 192 to 94.

The 1965 Hawkeyes gained 848 rushing yards and 1,241 passing yards. On defense, they gave up 1,710 rushing yards and 1,069 passing yards.

Guard John Niland won first-team All-America honors from Time and The Sporting News. Defensive end Dave Long received first-team All-America honors from the New York Daily News based on a poll of 113 sports writers and sports casters. Long was selected as the team's most valuable player. Noonan was the team captain.

The team played its home games at Iowa Stadium in Iowa City, Iowa. Home attendance totaled 263,700, an average of 52,740 per game.

== Schedule ==
Date	Opponent	Site	TV	Result	Attendance	Source
September 18	Washington State*	Iowa Stadium; Iowa City, IA		L 0–7	53,000	
September 25	at Oregon State*	Multnomah Stadium; Portland, OR	NBC	W 27–7	24,778	
October 2	at Wisconsin	Camp Randall Stadium; Madison, WI (rivalry)		L 13–16	63,058	
October 9	No. 6 Purdue^{†}	Iowa Stadium; Iowa City, IA		L 14–17	59,800	
October 16	Minnesota	Iowa Stadium; Iowa City, IA (rivalry)		L 3–14	59,200	
October 23	at Northwestern	Dyche Stadium; Evanston, IL		L 0–9	45,129	
October 30	at Indiana	Seventeenth Street Stadium; Bloomington, IN		L 17–21	32,417	
November 6	No. 1 Michigan State	Iowa Stadium; Iowa City, IA	NBC	L 0–35	54,700	
November 13	at Ohio State	Ohio Stadium; Columbus, OH		L 0–38	84,116	
November 20	NC State*	Iowa Stadium; Iowa City, IA		L 20–28	37,000	
*Non-conference game; ^{†}Homecoming; Rankings from AP Poll released prior to the game; Source:

== Players ==
The following players received varsity letters for their performance on the 1965 Iowa football team:

- Bob Anderson, kicker, sophomore
- Bill Briggs, defensive tackle, senior, 209 pounds, Westwood, NJ
- James Cmejrek
- John Diehl, offensive guard, sophomore, 235 pounds, Cedar Rapids, IA
- Terry Ferry
- John Ficeli, center, junior, 222 pounds, Grand Rapids, MI
- Dick Gibbs, junior, 180 pounds, Chariton, IA
- Carl Harris
- John Hendricks, offensive tackle, sophomore, 230 pounds, Boone, IA
- Richard Hendryx
- Dan Hilsabaeck, linebacker, junior, 192 pounds, Audulson, IA
- James Killbreath
- Dalton Kimble, halfback, junior, 161 pounds, Flint, MI
- Tom Knutson, linebacker, junior, 212 pounds, Cedar Rapids, IA
- William Krill
- John Lagota
- Roger Lamont
- Gary Larsen
- Farley Lewis
- Dave Long, defensive end, senior, 207 pounds, Cedar Rapids, IA
- Philip Major
- William McCutchen
- Larry McDowell
- Silas McKinnie, fullback, 195 pounds
- Leo Miller, middle guard, senior, 240 pounds, Sioux City, IA
- David Moreland
- James Moses
- David Moss
- Terry Mulligan, defensive end, junior, 199 pounds, Cleveland
- Michael Mullins
- John Niland, guard, senior, 260 pounds, Amityville, NY
- Karl Noonan, end/halfback, senior, 176 pounds, Davenport, IA
- Jerry O'Donnell, halfback
- Richard O'Hara, end (offense), junior, 188 pounds, Maquoketa, IA
- Al Randolph, defensive back, senior, 172 pounds, East St. Louis, IL
- Franklin Reinhardt
- Bill Restelli, defensive tackle, senior, 204 pounds, Great Falls, MT
- Charles Roland
- Karlin Ryan, defensive back, senior, 195 pounds, Beaver Falls, PA
- Philip Schooley
- Gary Simpson, fullback, senior, 195 pounds, Newton, IA
- William Smith
- Gary Snook, quarterback, senior, 181 pounds, Iowa City, IA
- Richard Somodi
- Gary Swain
- George Tompras
- Orville Townsend
- Paul Usinowicz
- Curtis Vande Walle
- Lee Weston
- Tony Williams, defensive back, sophomore, 190 pounds, Davenport, IA

== Statistical leaders ==
Quarterback Gary Snook completed 95 of 230 passes (41.3%) for 1,009 yards, four touchdowns, 23 interceptions, and a 63.9 quarterback rating.

The team's leading rushers were Silas McKinnie (286 yards on 89 carries, 3.2 yards per carry), Jerry O'Donnell (228 yards on 80 carries, 2.9 yards per carry), and Dalton Kimble (98 yards on 38 carries, 2.6 yards per carry).

The leading receivers were Karl Noonan (43 receptions for 545 yards), Cliff Wilder (23 receptons for 231 yards), Rich O'Hara (21 receptions for 230 yards), and Gary Larsen (seven receptions for 101 yards).

Kicker Bob Anderson led the team in scoring with 28 points. Cliff Wilder scored two touchdowns, the only player to score more than one touchdown.
