= 1965 Minnesota Golden Gophers football team =

American college football season

1965 Minnesota Golden Gophers football
- Conference: Big Ten Conference
- Record: 5–4–1 (5–2 Big Ten)
- Head coach: Murray Warmath (12th season)
- MVP: John Hankinson
- Captain: Paul Faust
- Home stadium: Memorial Stadium

1965 Big Ten Conference football standings
	Conf.					Overall
Team	W		L		T	W		L		T
No. 2 Michigan State $	7	–	0	–	0	10	–	1	–	0
Ohio State	6	–	1	–	0	7	–	2	–	0
Purdue	5	–	2	–	0	7	–	2	–	1
Minnesota	5	–	2	–	0	5	–	4	–	1
Illinois	4	–	3	–	0	6	–	4	–	0
Northwestern	3	–	4	–	0	4	–	6	–	0
Michigan	2	–	5	–	0	4	–	6	–	0
Wisconsin	2	–	5	–	0	2	–	7	–	1
Indiana	1	–	6	–	0	2	–	8	–	0
Iowa	0	–	7	–	0	1	–	9	–	0
$ – Conference champion; Rankings from AP Poll

The 1965 Minnesota Golden Gophers football team represented the University of Minnesota in the 1965 Big Ten Conference football season. In their 12th year under head coach Murray Warmath, the Golden Gophers compiled a 5–4–1 record and outscored their opponents by a combined total of 188 to 160.

Quarterback John Hankinson received the team's Most Valuable Player award. End Aaron Brown was named an All-American by the Associated Press, Look magazine, United Press International, Collier's/Grantland Rice and Football Writers Association of America. Brown was also named All-Big Ten first team.

Total attendance at six home games was 302,747, an average of 50,458 per game. The largest crowd was against Michigan.

== Schedule ==
Date	Opponent	Site	Result	Attendance	Source
September 17	at No. 7 USC*	Los Angeles Memorial Coliseum; Los Angeles, CA	T 20–20	58,497	
September 25	Washington State*	Memorial Stadium; Minneapolis, MN	L 13–14	46,917	
October 2	Missouri*	Memorial Stadium; Minneapolis, MN	L 6–17	49,889	
October 9	Indiana	Memorial Stadium; Minneapolis, MN	W 42–18	46,010	
October 16	at Iowa	Iowa Stadium; Iowa City, IA (rivalry)	W 14–3	59,200	
October 23	Michigan^{†}	Memorial Stadium; Minneapolis, MN (Little Brown Jug)	W 14–13	58,519	
October 30	at Ohio State	Ohio Stadium; Columbus, OH	L 10–11	84,359	
November 6	Northwestern	Memorial Stadium; Minneapolis, MN	W 27–22	50,565	
November 13	at Purdue	Ross–Ade Stadium; West Lafayette, IN	L 0–35	45,587	
November 20	Wisconsin	Memorial Stadium; Minneapolis, MN (rivalry)	W 42–7	50,847	
*Non-conference game; ^{†}Homecoming; Rankings from AP Poll released prior to the game; Source:

== Game summaries ==
=== Iowa ===
Floyd of Rosedale

=== Michigan ===
Little Brown Jug

Team	1	2	3	4	Total
Michigan	7	0	0	6	13
• Minnesota	0	0	7	7	14

- Date: October 23
- Location: Minneapolis

Scoring summary
1		MICH	Fisher 14-yard pass from Ward (Sygar kick)	MICH 7-0
3		MINN	Holmberg 8-yard run (Ramey kick)	Tied 7-7
4		MINN	Hankinson 1-yard run (Ramey kick)	MINN 14-7
4	1:22	MICH	Gabler 4-yard run (pass failed)	MINN 14-13

=== Ohio State ===
This was the first matchup between Minnesota and Ohio State in 15 years, last meeting during the 1950 season.

Team	1	2	3	4	Total
Minnesota	7	0	3	0	10
• Ohio State	0	8	0	3	11

- Date: October 30
- Location: Ohio Stadium
- Game attendance: 84,359
- Game weather: Clear, wind SW 10-15 mph, 60 °F (16 °C)

Scoring summary
Q1	10:04	MINN	Hankinson 1 yard run (Ramey kick)	MINN 0–7
Q2	8:30	OSU	Unverferth 25 yard pass to Adderly (Fontes run)	OSU 8–7
Q3	3:10	MINN	Ramey 32 yard field goal	MINN 8–10
Q4	1:17	OSU	Funk 18 yard field goal	OSU 11–10

=== Wisconsin ===
Paul Bunyan's Axe
