= Don Unverferth =

American cardiologist, professor, and college football player (1944–1988)

Profile
- Position: Quarterback
- Class: Former player

Personal information
- Born: April 21, 1944
- Died: January 8, 1988 (aged 43); Columbus, Ohio, U.S.
- Listed height: 6 ft 3 in (1.91 m)
- Listed weight: 205 lb (93 kg)

Career information
- High school: Chaminade (Dayton, OH)
- College: Ohio State (1962–1965)

Donald V. Unverferth (April 21, 1944 – January 8, 1988) was an American cardiologist, professor, and college football quarterback. He was the starting quarterback of the Ohio State Buckeyes football program for three years from 1963 to 1965 during which he broke the school's career passing record. He was later a cardiologist who oversaw the first heart bypass operation at Ohio State.

== Early life ==
Unverferth attended Chaminade High School in Dayton, Ohio.

== Ohio State ==
Unverferth enrolled at Ohio State University in 1962 and was the starting quarterback for the Ohio State Buckeyes football teams of 1963, 1964, and 1965. The Buckeyes compiled a 19–7–1 record during his three years as starting quarterback. He tallied 2,518 passing yards and held the school's career record in that category until 1979.

Unverferth received his undergraduate degree from Ohio State in 1966. The Baltimore Colts made him an offer, but he decided to "forego a shot at professional football" to attend medical school. Unverferth said at the time, "I had to realize what I wanted with my life. It's either one or the other and since I wanted to be a doctor so badly I had to go all the way with it." He enrolled the Ohio State University College of Medicine and in 1967 was selected by the faculty as the outstadnding first-year medical student. He received his M.D. in 1970.

== Medical career and family ==
Unverferth served for two years as a lieutenant commander in the United States Public Health Service Commissioned Corps and attended Stanford University on a fellowship from 1977 to 1978. In 1978, he joined the faculty of the Ohio State College of Medicine. He became an expert in congestive heart failure, publishing approximately 200 works. He was the director of the heart transplant team at Ohio State and oversaw the university's first heart transplant in 1986.

Unverferth and his wife, Barbara, had a son, Jeff, and three daughters, Tracey, Katie and Megan. He died at his home in Columbus, Ohio, in 1988 at age 43. The Unverferth House at Ohio State provides housing for the families of cardiac patients and was established in his honor.
