= 1965 Northwestern Wildcats football team =

American college football season

1965 Northwestern Wildcats football
- Conference: Big Ten Conference
- Record: 4–6 (3–4 Big Ten)
- Head coach: Alex Agase (2nd season)
- MVP: Jim Burns
- Captain: Jeff Brooke
- Home stadium: Dyche Stadium

1965 Big Ten Conference football standings
	Conf.					Overall
Team	W		L		T	W		L		T
No. 2 Michigan State $	7	–	0	–	0	10	–	1	–	0
Ohio State	6	–	1	–	0	7	–	2	–	0
Purdue	5	–	2	–	0	7	–	2	–	1
Minnesota	5	–	2	–	0	5	–	4	–	1
Illinois	4	–	3	–	0	6	–	4	–	0
Northwestern	3	–	4	–	0	4	–	6	–	0
Michigan	2	–	5	–	0	4	–	6	–	0
Wisconsin	2	–	5	–	0	2	–	7	–	1
Indiana	1	–	6	–	0	2	–	8	–	0
Iowa	0	–	7	–	0	1	–	9	–	0
$ – Conference champion; Rankings from AP Poll

The 1965 Northwestern Wildcats team represented Northwestern University during the 1965 Big Ten Conference football season. In their second year under head coach Alex Agase, the Wildcats compiled a 4–6 record (3–4 against Big Ten Conference opponents) and finished in sixth place in the Big Ten Conference.

The team's offensive leaders were quarterback Denny Boothe with 487 passing yards, Bob McKelvey with 587 rushing yards, and Cas Banaszek with 333 receiving yards. McKelvey, Banaszek, and tackle Jim Burns were selected by the Associated Press as second-team All-Big Ten players.

== Schedule ==
Date	Opponent	Site	Result	Attendance	Source
September 18	Florida*	Dyche Stadium; Evanston, IL	L 14–24	33,918	
September 25	at Indiana	Seventeenth Street Stadium; Bloomington, IN	W 20–0	31,537	
October 2	at No. 8 Notre Dame*	Notre Dame Stadium; Notre Dame, IN (rivalry)	L 7–38	59,273	
October 9	Oregon State*	Dyche Stadium; Evanston, IL	W 15–7	34,575	
October 16	Wisconsin	Dyche Stadium; Evanston, IL	L 7–21	44,444	
October 23	Iowa	Dyche Stadium; Evanston, IL	W 9–0	45,129	
October 30	at No. 1 Michigan State	Spartan Stadium; East Lansing, MI	L 7–49	74,215	
November 6	at Minnesota	Memorial Stadium; Minneapolis, MN	L 22–27	50,565	
November 13	Michigan	Dyche Stadium; Evanston, IL (rivalry)	W 34–22	40,007	
November 20	Illinois	Dyche Stadium; Evanston, IL (rivalry)	L 6–20	41,348	
*Non-conference game; Rankings from AP Poll released prior to the game; Source:
