= 1965 Indiana Hoosiers football team =

American college football season

1965 Indiana Hoosiers football
- Conference: Big Ten Conference
- Record: 2–8 (1–6 Big Ten)
- Head coach: John Pont (1st season)
- MVP: Bill Malinchak
- Captain: Bill Malinchak
- Home stadium: Seventeenth Street Stadium

1965 Big Ten Conference football standings
	Conf.					Overall
Team	W		L		T	W		L		T
No. 2 Michigan State $	7	–	0	–	0	10	–	1	–	0
Ohio State	6	–	1	–	0	7	–	2	–	0
Purdue	5	–	2	–	0	7	–	2	–	1
Minnesota	5	–	2	–	0	5	–	4	–	1
Illinois	4	–	3	–	0	6	–	4	–	0
Northwestern	3	–	4	–	0	4	–	6	–	0
Michigan	2	–	5	–	0	4	–	6	–	0
Wisconsin	2	–	5	–	0	2	–	7	–	1
Indiana	1	–	6	–	0	2	–	8	–	0
Iowa	0	–	7	–	0	1	–	9	–	0
$ – Conference champion; Rankings from AP Poll

The 1965 Indiana Hoosiers football team represented the Indiana Hoosiers in the 1965 Big Ten Conference football season. They participated as members of the Big Ten Conference. The Hoosiers played their home games at Seventeenth Street Stadium in Bloomington, Indiana. The team was coached by John Pont, in his first year as head coach of the Hoosiers.

== Schedule ==
Date	Time	Opponent	Site	TV	Result	Attendance	Source
September 18		Kansas State*	Seventeenth Street Stadium; Bloomington, IN	NBC	W 19–7	22,883	
September 25		Northwestern	Seventeenth Street Stadium; Bloomington, IN		L 0–20	31,537	
October 2	7:30 pm	at No. 1 Texas*	Memorial Stadium; Austin, TX		L 12–27	57,000	
October 9		at Minnesota	Memorial Stadium; Minneapolis, MN		L 18–42	46,010	
October 16		at Illinois	Memorial Stadium; Champaign, IL (rivalry)		L 13–34	61,257	
October 23		Washington State*	Seventeenth Street Stadium; Bloomington, IN		L 7–8	32,601	
October 30		Iowa^{†}	Seventeenth Street Stadium; Bloomington, IN		W 21–17	32,417	
November 6		at Ohio State	Ohio Stadium; Columbus, OH		L 10–17	83,863	
November 13		at No. 1 Michigan State	Spartan Stadium; East Lansing, MI (rivalry)		L 13–27	75,280	
November 20		Purdue	Seventeenth Street Stadium; Bloomington, IN (Old Oaken Bucket)		L 21–26	50,046	
*Non-conference game; ^{†}Homecoming; Rankings from AP Poll released prior to the game; All times are in Eastern time; Source:

== 1966 NFL draftees ==
Player	Position	Round	Pick	NFL club
Randy Beisler	Defensive end	1	4	Philadelphia Eagles
Bill Malinchak	Wide receiver	3	39	Detroit Lions
Ken Hollister	Tackle	12	171	Atlanta Falcons
Tom Gallagher	Defensive end	20	299	St. Louis Cardinals
