= Tom Pullen =

Canadian gridiron football player (born 1945)

Profile
- Position: Tight end

Personal information
- Born: January 3, 1945 (age 81); Ottawa, Ontario, Canada
- Listed height: 6 ft 4 in (1.93 m)
- Listed weight: 205 lb (93 kg)

Career information
- High school: Glebe Collegiate Institute
- College: University of Michigan

Career history
- 1968–1969: Ottawa Rough Riders
- 1970–1971: Montreal Alouettes
- 1972–1974: Ottawa Rough Riders
- 1975: Toronto Argonauts

Awards and highlights
- 4× Grey Cup champion (1968, 1969, 1970, 1973)

Thomas Pullen (born January 3, 1945) is a Canadian former football player. He played college football at the University of Michigan from 1965 to 1967. A native of Ottawa, Ontario, he also played professional football in the Canadian Football League for the Ottawa Rough Riders (1968–1969, 1972–1974), the Montreal Alouettes (1970–1971), and the Toronto Argonauts (1975).

== Early life ==
Pullen was born in Ottawa, Ontario, in 1945. He attended Glebe Collegiate Institute, a high school in Ottawa, where he played football, basketball and ran track and field. He was selected as Glebe's most outstanding football player in 1961, set records in the high jump, hurdles and sprints, and led the basketball team to the Ontario provincial finals. He also played goalie for the Ottawa Montagnards and was also one of the first players in Canadian Little League history to pitch a no-hit shut-out.

== University of Michigan ==
Pullen enrolled at the University of Michigan in 1965 and played college football for the Michigan Wolverines football team from 1965 to 1967. He was the first Canadian to receive a full football scholarship from the school, and he became the first Canadian to letter with the Michigan football team. He played principally at the end position for the 1965 Michigan Wolverines football team. Pullen graduated from the University of Michigan with degrees in science and education.

== Professional football ==
Pullen later played seven seasons in the Canadian Football League with the Ottawa Rough Riders (1968–1969, 1972–1974), the Montreal Alouettes (1970–1971), and the Toronto Argonauts (1975). He had his best season in 1971 when he caught 34 passes for 487 yards and three touchdowns as a member of the Alouettes. He was a member of three consecutive Grey Cup championship teams (two with Ottawa with 1968 and 1979, and one with Montreal in 1970), and he also a fourth Grey Cup championship with Ottawa in 1973.

== Later life ==
While playing football, Pullen was a teacher and basketball and track coach at Glebe Collegiate in Ottawa. He also held coaching positions with the Carleton Ravens (three years as receivers coach), Midget Nepean Rams (one year as assistant coach), and Ashbury (one season as the goalie coach). He later became a vice-president of business development for Innovative Financial Group Inc.
