= Tom Cecchini =

American football player and coach (born 1944)

Biographical details
- Born: September 12, 1944 (age 82); Detroit, Michigan, U.S.
- Died: August 30, 2023 (aged 78)

Playing career
- 1963–1965: Michigan
- 1967: Ypsilanti Vikings
- Position: Linebacker

Coaching career (HC unless noted)
- 1970–1971: Xavier (assistant)
- 1972–1973: Xavier
- 1974–1975: Iowa (assistant)
- 1976–1977: Toledo (assistant)
- 1978–1979: Iowa (assistant)
- 1980–1983: Minnesota Vikings (assistant)

Head coaching record
- Overall: 8–13–1

Accomplishments and honors

Awards
- Second-team All-Big Ten (1965)

Thomas Allen Cecchini (December 9, 1944 – August 30, 2023) was an American football player and coach. He played college football as an All-Big Ten Conference linebacker at the University of Michigan, and he held coaching positions with Xavier University, University of Iowa, and the Minnesota Vikings. In two years as the head coach at Xavier, he compiled a record of 8–13–1.

== Early years ==
Cecchini was born in Detroit in 1944, the son of Geno and Clementina (Salvucci) Cecchini. He had three siblings: Eugene, Carol Dawn, and Karen. He played attended Detroit's Pershing High School where he was selected as an all-city player in 1961. He was a two-way center at Pershing.

== University of Michigan ==
In the fall of 1962, Cecchini enrolled at the University of Michigan. As a sophomore in 1963, he started the first four games of the season as a two-way player at center and linebacker. He was selected by the UPI was the Midwest Lineman of the Week for his performance against Michigan State on October 12, 1963. One week later, he tore ligaments in his left knee in a game against Purdue and was lost to the team for the remainder of the 1963 season.

After surgery on his knee, Cecchini returned to Michigan in 1964. He played 300 minutes, principally at linebacker, in Michigan's nine regular season games, helping the Wolverines to an 8–1 record and a Big Ten championship. He was again selected by the UPI as the Midwest Lineman of the Week for his role in Michigan's 10–0 victory over Ohio State. At the end of the 1964 season he was selected by the Associated Press (AP) as a first-team linebacker on the 1964 All-Big Ten Conference football team.

In January 1965, Cecchini was voted by his teammates as captain of the 1965 Michigan Wolverines football team. He started all 10 games at linebacker for a 1965 team that saw its record drop to 4–6. At the end of the 1965 season, he was selected by both the AP and UPI as a second-team player on the 1965 All-Big Ten Conference football team.

After leaving Michigan, Cecchini played for the Ypsilanti Vikings of the Midwest Football League and was selected as a first-team, all-league linebacker in 1967.

== Coaching career ==
After receiving his bachelor's degree from Michigan in 1966, he remained at Michigan as a member of Michigan's coaching staff. He also received a master's degree in education at Michigan. In 1970, he was hired as the defensive line coach at Xavier University in Cincinnati, Ohio. He served as the head football coach at Xavier from 1972 to 1973. At the end of the 1973 season, Xavier terminated its intercollegiate football program. In January 1974, he was hired as an assistant football coach at the University of Iowa, where former Michigan head coach Bump Elliott was employed as the athletic director. After two seasons at Iowa, he became defensive coordinator at Toledo for the 1976 and 1977 seasons. He returned to Iowa for the 1978 season as defensive coordinator. He was retained by Hayden Fry when he took over as head coach at Iowa in 1979, but moved to linebackers coach for that season. He left Iowa to become defensive line coach for the Minnesota Vikings in March 1980.

== Business career ==
In 1984, Cecchini quit coaching to form a computer document processing company and a software company. In the mid-1990s, Cecchini's companies went out of business, and Cecchini filed for person bankruptcy. In September 1998, Cecchini was hired by Michigan athletic director Tom Goss as an associate athletic director at Michigan. In 1999, Cecchini became embroiled in controversy. Cecchini received a salary of $96,000 and bonuses of $12,800 at Michigan. The Detroit News reported that Goss stated that Cecchini had been making about $200,000 a year, but an investigation by the newspaper showed he had been a $38,400 employee of a Minnesota video technology company when he was hired by Goss. The News investigation also criticized Goss for following Cecchini's advice concerning the installation of new electronic scoreboards at Michigan Stadium and Crisler Arena.

== Death ==
Cecchini died on August 30, 2023, due to complications from sepsis.

== Head coaching record ==
Year	Team	Overall	Conference	Standing	Bowl/playoffs
Xavier Musketeers (NCAA University Division / NCAA Division I independent) (1972–1973)
1972	Xavier	3–8			
1973	Xavier	5–5–1			
Xavier:		8–13–1			
Total:		8–13–1			
