= Gale Gillingham =

American football player (1944–2011)

No. 68
- Position: Guard

Personal information
- Born: February 3, 1944; Madison, Wisconsin, U.S.
- Died: October 20, 2011 (aged 67); Little Falls, Minnesota, U.S.
- Listed height: 6 ft 3 in (1.91 m)
- Listed weight: 255 lb (116 kg)

Career information
- High school: Little Falls (Little Falls, Minnesota)
- College: Minnesota (1962-1965)
- NFL draft: 1966: 1st round, 13th overall pick

Career history
- Green Bay Packers (1966–1974, 1976)

Awards and highlights
- 2× Super Bowl champion (I, II); 2× NFL champion (1966, 1967); 3× First-team All-Pro (1969, 1970, 1974); 3× Second-team All-Pro (1968, 1971, 1973); 5× Pro Bowl (1969–1971, 1973, 1974); Green Bay Packers Hall of Fame; Second-team All-Big Ten (1965)

Career NFL statistics
- Games played: 128
- Games started: 115
- Fumble recoveries: 3
- Stats at Pro Football Reference

Gale Herbert Gillingham (February 3, 1944 – October 20, 2011) was an American professional football player who was a guard for 10 seasons in the National Football League (NFL) with the Green Bay Packers (1966–1974, 1976).

== Early life ==
Gillingham was born on February 5, 1944, in Madison, Wisconsin. He moved to Stoughton, Wisconsin at age five, and grew up on a farm there. At age 13, his family moved to Tomah, Wisconsin, and then at age 16 Gillingham's family moved to Little Falls, Minnesota, when he was in high school.

He began high school at Monticello High School and/or Tomah High School, but attended Little Falls High School for his junior and senior years after moving to Minnesota. He was a 6 ft 3 in (1.9 m), 215 pound (97.5 kg) fullback on Little Falls' football team, rushing for over 1,000 yards in 1961. He was also on the track and field team, and was a Minnesota State Champion as a senior in throwing the discus in 1962. As a junior, he had set a conference record in the discus throw. He also threw shot put. He was also a member of Little Falls' basketball team.

== College ==
Gillingham played college football for the Minnesota Golden Gophers. He played tackle on both offense and defense, and was also used as a running back. As a senior, he was named second-team All-Big Ten at offensive tackle.

Before his sophomore season (1963), the team planned to use him as a fullback. However, before the season began, Gillingham left the football team, saying he was only playing because his father wanted him to; telling coach Murray Warmath he did not like the sport and would be locked into it if he joined the varsity team. His coaches were surprised, and Gillingham returned to his family home to reflect on decisions he needed to make concerning his future, including coming back to the football team. Gillingham did not play in 1963, but returned to play for Minnesota the next season (1964), as a junior. However, Gillingham lost his scholarship and had to prove himself on a trial basis before Warmath would allow him to rejoin the team.

At Minnesota, his teammates included All-American and future Kansas City Chiefs defensive end Aaron Brown, whom Gillingham faced in Super Bowl I (though neither started in that game).

Gillingham played in the 1966 Senior Bowl. Gillingham also was selected to play in Chicago College All-Star Game, but broke a bone in his hand while training with the team and could not make the college team. However, the July 1966 game was against the Green Bay Packers (the 1965 NFL champions), and as the Packers drafted Gillingham, coach Vince Lombardi played him in the College All-Star Game for the Packers and against the collegians.

== Professional career ==
The Packers drafted Gillingham in the first round with the 13th overall selection of the 1966 NFL draft, where he began his career in 1966 under Hall of Fame head coach Vince Lombardi. Gillingham's selection was made with the knowledge the Packers' offensive line was aging. The 1965 Packers had been NFL champions, and their starting guards on the team were future Hall of Famer Jerry Kramer at right guard and Fred "Fuzzy" Thurston at left guard. By the start of the 1966 season, the 30-year old Kramer had been a first-team All-Pro three times. Thurston, who had been a first- or second-team All-Pro in 1960-61, would be turning 33 toward the end of the season.

=== Lombardi years ===
In 1966, Thurston started at left guard in the team's first 12 games of the season. Gillingham replaced Thurston as a starter in the second-to-last game of the regular season against the Baltimore Colts, after Thurston injured his ankle a week earlier during a game against the San Francisco 49ers. Gillingham also replaced the still-injured Thurston in the final game of the season against the Los Angeles Rams the following week on December 18, 1966.

When the Packers reached the NFL Championship Game against the Dallas Cowboys on January 1, 1967, Thurston started, but Cowboys Hall of Fame coach Tom Landry said before the game, "'This kid Gale Gillingham, who put Thurston on the bench, must be wonderful'". After defeating the Cowboys, 34–27, the Packers defeated the Kansas City Chiefs, 35–10, on January 15, 1967, in Super Bowl I. Thurston again started at left guard, Lombardi favoring Thurston's experience in big games even though Gillingham had shown brilliant promise in his play as a rookie. This would be Thurston's fifth championship game (one with the 1958 Baltimore Colts and four with the Packers).

During the 1967 season, Gillingham took Thurston's spot full-time at left guard, starting all 14 games, playing opposite Kramer except when Kramer was hurt. Evan at 260 pounds (117.9 kg), he was considered the fastest man on the team, excluding receivers. This was Thurston's final season, playing in nine games as a backup. Gillingham believed that his teammates recognized and accepted that his starting over Thurston was best for the team.

Despite going with Thurston's experience a year earlier, Lombardi started Gillingham in the 1967 playoffs. The Packers first defeated the Los Angeles Rams, 28–7, in the Western Division playoffs, where Gillingham faced the Rams' 300-pound Pro Bowl tackle Roger Brown. The Packers next played the Cowboys again for the 1967 NFL Championship, winning 21–17 on the game's last play. The game came to be known as the "Ice Bowl" because of the sub-freezing temperatures in which the teams played, reaching as low as –18 degrees Fahrenheit (-27.8 C) at the end of the game. Gillingham faced Hall of Fame right tackle Bob Lilly, one of the NFL's top 100 players of all time, in that game.

The Packers then defeated the Oakland Raiders in Super Bowl II, 33–14. Gillingham battled against American Football League (AFL) All-Pro right defensive tackle Tom Keating throughout the game. This was the last game for Vince Lombardi as head coach after nine seasons with the team.

=== Packers under Phil Bengston, Dan Devine and Bart Starr ===
After winning two Super Bowls in Gillingham's first two seasons, the Packers would only make the playoffs one time over the rest of Gillingham's career, and have only two seasons above .500, under head coaches Phil Bengston (1968-70), Dan Devine (1971-74) and former Packers Hall of Fame quarterback Bart Starr (1976). Individually, however, Gillingham was stellar during this period.

Gillingham was a five-time Pro Bowler (1969-71, 1973-74). In 1968, the Newspaper Enterprise Association (NEA) and United Press International selected him NFL second-team All-Pro. 1969, the NEA selected him first-team All-Pro, and the Associated Press (AP), Pro Football Hall of Fame and UPI selected him second-team All-Pro. The AP and NEA both selected him NFL first-team All-Pro in 1970. In 1971, the NEA again selected him first-team All-Pro and the Pro Football Writers of America selected him second-team All-Pro. In 1973, the Pro Football Writers selected him second-team All-Pro, and in 1974, the NEA again named him first-team All-Pro.

Gillingham was selected as the inaugural winner of the Football Writers Association of America Forrest Gregg Award for the NFL Offensive Lineman of the Year following the 1970 season. Gillingham had played on the same offensive line with Gregg from 1966 to 1970. He was the NFC choice as the NFLPA/Coca-Cola Offensive Lineman of the Year for 1971.

Gillingham moved to right guard in 1969, after Kramer retired. After three unsuccessful seasons, Bengtson resigned after the 1970 season. In Devine's first year (1971), the team was 4–8–2, with Gillingham at right guard and Mike McCoy starting the majority of games at defensive left tackle.

The only season he was not on offense was 1972 when head coach Dan Devine shifted him to the defensive line after the pre-season, even though Gillingham was the team's best offensive lineman. Devine had been thinking of the move for a year, and the team's left defensive tackle Mike McCoy was injured in training camp 1972. Devine traded running back Dave Hampton to the Atlanta Falcons for guard Mal Snider, to facilitate Gillingham's move to defensive tackle. Snider started all 14 games at right guard in 1972.

Gillingham, who considered himself the best offensive guard in the NFL at the time, did not agree with Devine's decision to move him to the defensive line. One Wisconsin writer later called the move "hare-brained", and quoted Packers Hall of Fame linebacker Dave Robinson as saying Devine did not know what he was doing and that switching Gillingham to defense "'made no sense whatsoever" and "was the dumbest thing in the world'". Devine's move failed when Gillingham sustained a season-ending knee injury two games into the regular season, and he was criticized for eventually being a factor in diminishing the team's playoff run. Gillingham had knee surgery in 1972 and again in 1974, and another knee injury ended his career in 1976.

During that season, the success of the Packers' offense heavily depended on a strong running attack led by MacArthur Lane and John Brockington, who gained over 2,000 yards from scrimmage between them. Though Gillingham missed virtually the entire season, this would be the first time the Packers reached the playoffs since Super Bowl II, losing in the first round to Washington 16–3. Brockington, who rushed for over 1,000 yards during the season, had only nine yards on 13 carries during the playoff game.

Lane considered Gillingham the leader of the Packers offense, and that if Gillingham had stayed at guard in 1972 the team would have fared even better. Brockington had been the first running back to rush for over 1,000 in his first three seasons (1971-73). During the two seasons Gillingham blocked for Brockington (1971, 1973), Brockington averaged 5.1 and 4.3 yards per carry; while in 1972, Brockington averaged only 3.7 yards per carry.

While Gillingham returned to top form at right guard in 1973 (with Snider moving to left tackle), the Packers record fell to 5–7–2. In 1974, Gillingham was selected to his fifth and final Pro Bowl, and was a Packers team captain, but the team finished 6–8. It was a divisive year for the team and head coach Dan Devine, both with the front office and among the coaches and players. Devine resigned after the 1974 season.

Divine was replaced by former Packers Hall of Fame quarterback Bart Starr as head coach, who brought in Leon McLaughlin as his offensive line coach. While Gillingham liked his former teammate Starr personally, he had no faith in the new offensive system Starr wanted to implement, or in McLaughlin. Gillingham asked to be traded. When this did not happen, he chose to sit out the 1975 season.

When the Packers still refused to trade him, Gillingham decided to rejoin the team in 1976. He started all 14 games at right guard that season, but retired permanently at the end of the season. Gillingham still had differences with the team's offensive philosophy, and his knees were weakened after three surgeries during his career. When he retired a few months after the 1976 season, the 33-year old Gillingham was the last member of the Lombardi-era Packers to be active as a player with the franchise. The 42-year old Bart Starr, whom Gillingham blocked for in the first two Super Bowl seasons, was the team's head coach.

== Legacy and honors ==
In 1982, he was inducted into the Green Bay Packers Hall of Fame. In 2016, the Professional Football Researchers Association named Gillingham to the PFRA Hall of Very Good Class of 2016. Former Packers center Larry McCarran believed Gillingham's decision not to politic for inclusion in the Hall of Fame hurt his chances; and Green Bay sports editor Cliff Christl, a Hall of Fame voter, believed Gillingham's lack of inclusion involved some fatigue with so many members of the Packers being inducted into the Hall of Fame, along with the poor quality of the post-Lombardi Packers being held against Gillingham's selection.

Bob Lilly said Gillingham was the best guard he had ever played against. Packers center Ken Bowman considered Gillingham the greatest guard with whom he had ever played, which included Kramer and Thurston.

== Personal life and death ==
After his playing days, Gillingham was in the real estate business in Little Falls, Minnesota and retired in 2010. Noted for his brute strength, he was one of the first players in the NFL to use weight training to stay in playing shape during the offseason, and continued weight training well into his retirement. His oldest son, Karl, is a Professional Strongman and has competed in two Worlds Strongest Man competitions. Middle son, Brad, is a 6 time World Champion powerlifter with several National and World Records. Youngest son, Wade, is a former Professional Strongman and is widely regarded as having one of the best grips in the world.

In 1982, the Packers offered him $3,656 to resolve a claim Gillingham raised with the Wisconsin Employment Relations Commission arising out of knee injuries he suffered while playing for the Packers that ultimately ended his career at age 33.

Gillingham died at age 67 in 2011 in Little Falls, while lifting weights.
