= Mike Fitzgerald (American football) =

American football player (born 1941)

Profile
- Position: Defensive back

Personal information
- Born: May 4, 1941 (age 85); Detroit, Michigan, U.S.

Career information
- College: Iowa State

Career history
- 1966–1967: Minnesota Vikings
- 1967: New York Giants
- 1967: Atlanta Falcons
- Stats at Pro Football Reference

Mike Fitzgerald (born May 4, 1941) is an American former professional football player who was a defensive back in the National Football League (NFL) for the Minnesota Vikings, New York Giants, and Atlanta Falcons. He played college football for the Iowa State Cyclones.
