= Chuck Arrobio =

American football player (1944–2018)

No. 79
- Position: Tackle

Personal information
- Born: July 9, 1944; Los Angeles, California, U.S.
- Died: March 18, 2018 (aged 73); Pasadena, California, U.S.
- Listed height: 6 ft 4 in (1.93 m)
- Listed weight: 250 lb (113 kg)

Career information
- High school: Glendale (CA)
- College: USC
- NFL draft: 1966: undrafted

Career history
- Minnesota Vikings (1966)

Awards and highlights
- First-team All-PCC (1965)
- Stats at Pro Football Reference

Charles Augustus Arrobio (July 9, 1944 – March 18, 2018) was an American football tackle who played for the USC Trojans and the Minnesota Vikings.

He is one of at least 345 NFL players to be diagnosed after death with chronic traumatic encephalopathy (CTE), which is caused by repeated hits to the head.
