= Bill Briggs (defensive end) =

American football player (born 1943)

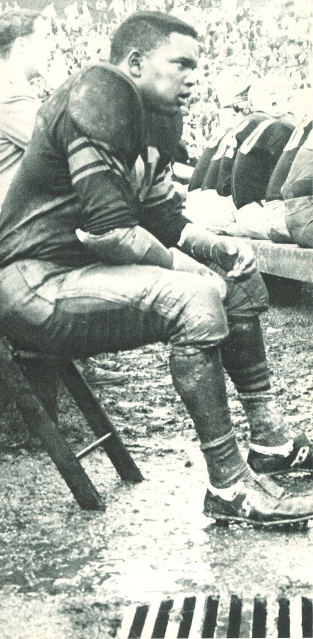
- Briggs while with Iowa in 1966

No. 86
- Position: Defensive end

Personal information
- Born: December 25, 1943 (age 82); Sanford, North Carolina, U.S.
- Listed height: 6 ft 3 in (1.91 m)
- Listed weight: 250 lb (113 kg)

Career information
- High school: Hackensack (Hackensack, New Jersey)
- College: Iowa (1962–1965)
- NFL draft: 1966: 5th round, 75th overall pick

Career history
- New York Giants (1966)*; Minnesota Vikings (1966)*; Washington Redskins (1966–1967); Virginia Sailors (1968)
- * Offseason or practice squad member only

Awards and highlights
- Second-team All-Big Ten (1965)

Career NFL statistics
- Fumble recoveries: 1
- Sacks: 1
- Stats at Pro Football Reference

William John Briggs (born December 25, 1943) is an American former professional football player who was a defensive end in the National Football League (NFL) for the Washington Redskins. He played college football for the Iowa Hawkeyes and was selected in the fifth round of the 1966 NFL draft.
