= Tom Mack =

American football player (born 1943)

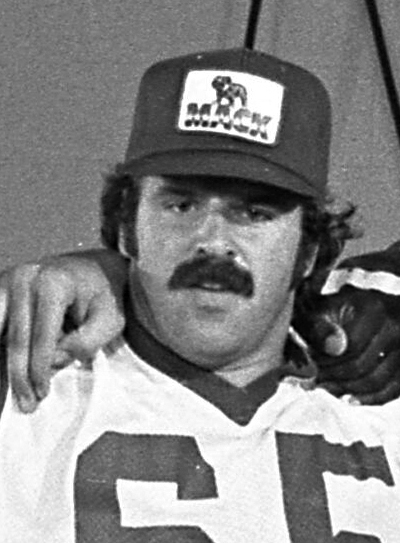
- Mack in 1975

No. 65
- Position: Guard

Personal information
- Born: November 1, 1943 (age 83); Cleveland, Ohio, U.S.
- Listed height: 6 ft 3 in (1.91 m)
- Listed weight: 250 lb (113 kg)

Career information
- High school: Cleveland Heights (Cleveland Heights, Ohio)
- College: Michigan (1963–1965)
- NFL draft: 1966: 1st round, 2nd overall pick

Career history
- Los Angeles Rams (1966–1978)

Awards and highlights
- 4× First-team All-Pro (1969, 1971, 1973, 1974); 4× Second-team All-Pro (1968, 1970, 1972, 1975); 11× Pro Bowl (1967–1975, 1977, 1978); Second-team All-American (1965); First-team All-Big Ten (1965); St. Louis Football Ring of Fame; University of Michigan Athletic Hall of Honor

Career NFL statistics
- Games played: 184
- Games started: 176
- Fumble recoveries: 5
- Stats at Pro Football Reference
- Pro Football Hall of Fame

Thomas Lee Mack (born November 1, 1943) is an American former professional football player who was a guard for the Los Angeles Rams of the National Football League (NFL). He was inducted into the Pro Football Hall of Fame in 1999.

A native of Cleveland, Ohio, Mack played college football as an end and tackle for the Michigan Wolverines from 1963 to 1965. He was a starter on the 1964 Michigan team that won the Big Ten Conference championship and defeated Oregon State in the 1965 Rose Bowl. He was selected as a first-team All-Big Ten player in 1965 and was inducted into the University of Michigan Athletic Hall of Honor in 2006.

Mack was selected by the Rams with the second overall pick of the 1966 NFL draft and played at left guard for the Rams for 13 seasons from 1966 to 1978. During his NFL career, Mack played in 11 Pro Bowls and appeared in 184 consecutive games, 176 as a starter, over 13 seasons.

== Early life ==
Mack was born in 1943 in Cleveland, Ohio, and attended Cleveland Heights High School. He was the son of Ray Mack, a Cleveland native who played Major League Baseball as a second baseman from 1938 to 1947, including eight seasons with the Cleveland Indians. Mack became an Eagle Scout in 1960, and he later became a recipient of the Distinguished Eagle Scout Award.

== College career ==
Mack enrolled at the University of Michigan in 1962 and was a member of the Michigan Wolverines football team from 1962 to 1965. As a sophomore in 1963, he played at the end position and spent most of the season on the bench. After the 1963 season, Mack switched to the tackle position at the suggestion of Michigan coach Bump Elliott. Mack later referred to the position change as "the big break of my life," an opportunity that "turned my whole experience in terms of football around."

As a junior, he started seven games at right tackle and won the Meyer Morton Award for the 1964 Michigan Wolverines football team that compiled a 9–1 record, outscored opponents 235–83, and defeated Oregon State in the 1965 Rose Bowl. As a senior, he started seven games at right tackle for the 1965 Michigan team, and he was selected by the Associated Press as a first-team tackle on the 1965 All-Big Ten Conference football team. Mack was inducted into the University of Michigan Athletic Hall of Honor in 2006.

While attending Michigan, Mack was a member of Sigma Alpha Epsilon fraternity.

== Professional career ==
Mack was selected by the Los Angeles Rams in the first round, as the second overall pick, in the 1966 NFL draft. During Mack's rookie season with the Rams, starter Don Chuy was injured during the fifth game of the season, allowing Mack to move into the lineup. He started nine games during the 1966 season and became a fixture for the Rams at the left guard position for the next 13 seasons. During his NFL career, Mack never missed a game due to injury, appearing in 184 consecutive contests, the third longest streak in Rams history behind Merlin Olsen and Jack Youngblood.

During Mack's career with the Rams, the club enjoyed a .720 winning percentage with a won-lost-tie record of 129–48–7, won their division eight times (1967, 1969, and 1973–1978), and reached four NFC championship games. In 1973, the Rams scored led the NFL with 388 points (27.7 points/game). In 1974, the Rams lost to the Minnesota Vikings by four points in the 1974 NFC Championship Game, with a controversial penalty call against Mack costing the Rams a touchdown. The Rams had the ball at the one-yard line on second down when the Vikings' Alan Page made contact with Mack; the referee called illegal procedure on Mack, but replays showed that Mack had not moved. After the game, Mack insisted he had not moved but credited Page with "a smart play" in making contact since a penalty, if called against the Vikings, would have been meaningless.

Mack was selected to 11 Pro Bowls, the first coming after his second season in 1967. He missed only one Pro Bowl appearance the rest of his career (1976). Mack's 11 invitations earned him a third-place tie with Bob Lilly and Ken Houston for the most selections of all time. Mack was selected first-team All-Pro four times (1969, 1971, 1973, 1974) and second-team All-Pro four times (1968, 1970, 1972, and 1975). In addition, he was named All-NFC eight times between 1970 and 1978.

Mack announced in late November 1978 that he would retire at the end of the 1978 NFL season. He was inducted into the Pro Football Hall of Fame in 1999.

== Later life ==
After retiring from football, Mack worked as an engineer, using the engineering degree he received at the University of Michigan. He eventually became a lobbyist for Bechtel Group, Inc. Mack has a daughter named Carrie who attended Quince Orchard High School in Gaithersburg, MD (Class of 1992).
