= 1965 Purdue Boilermakers football team =

American college football season

1965 Purdue Boilermakers football
- Conference: Big Ten Conference

Ranking
- Coaches: No. 13
- Record: 7–2–1 (5–2 Big Ten)
- Head coach: Jack Mollenkopf (10th season)
- MVP: Bob Griese
- Captains: Sal Ciampi; Jerry Shay
- Home stadium: Ross–Ade Stadium

1965 Big Ten Conference football standings
	Conf.					Overall
Team	W		L		T	W		L		T
No. 2 Michigan State $	7	–	0	–	0	10	–	1	–	0
Ohio State	6	–	1	–	0	7	–	2	–	0
Purdue	5	–	2	–	0	7	–	2	–	1
Minnesota	5	–	2	–	0	5	–	4	–	1
Illinois	4	–	3	–	0	6	–	4	–	0
Northwestern	3	–	4	–	0	4	–	6	–	0
Michigan	2	–	5	–	0	4	–	6	–	0
Wisconsin	2	–	5	–	0	2	–	7	–	1
Indiana	1	–	6	–	0	2	–	8	–	0
Iowa	0	–	7	–	0	1	–	9	–	0
$ – Conference champion; Rankings from AP Poll

The 1965 Purdue Boilermakers football team represented Purdue University during the 1965 Big Ten Conference football season. Led by tenth-year head coach Jack Mollenkopf, the Boilermakers compiled an overall record of 7–2–1 with a mark of 5–2 in conference play, tying for third place in the Big Ten. Purdue played home games at Ross–Ade Stadium in West Lafayette, Indiana.

== Schedule ==
Date	Opponent	Rank	Site	Result	Attendance	Source
September 18	Miami (OH)*	No. 9	Ross–Ade Stadium; West Lafayette, IN	W 38–0	44,809	
September 25	No. 1 Notre Dame*	No. 6	Ross–Ade Stadium; West Lafayette, IN (rivalry)	W 25–21	61,291	
October 2	at SMU*	No. 2	Cotton Bowl; Dallas, TX	T 14–14	17,000	
October 9	at Iowa	No. 6	Iowa Stadium; Iowa City, IA	W 17–14	59,800	
October 16	at Michigan	No. 7	Michigan Stadium; Ann Arbor, MI	W 17–15	85,905	
October 23	No. 2 Michigan State^{†}	No. 6	Ross–Ade Stadium; West Lafayette, IN	L 10–14	62,113	
October 30	at Illinois	No. 6	Memorial Stadium; Champaign, IL (rivalry)	L 0–21	59,507	
November 6	Wisconsin		Ross–Ade Stadium; West Lafayette, IN	W 45–7	48,369	
November 13	Minnesota		Ross–Ade Stadium; West Lafayette, IN	W 35–0	45,587	
November 20	at Indiana		Seventeenth Street Stadium; Bloomington, IN (Old Oaken Bucket)	W 26–21	50,046	
*Non-conference game; ^{†}Homecoming; Rankings from AP Poll released prior to the game; Source:

== Game summaries ==
=== Iowa ===
Team	1	2	3	4	Total
• Purdue	0	7	7	3	17
Iowa	0	7	0	7	14

- Date: October 9
- Location: Kinnick Stadium, Iowa City, IA
- Game attendance: 59,800

Scoring summary
2	IOWA	Kimble 42-yard pass from Snook (Anderson kick)	IOWA 7-0
2	PUR	Griese 1-yard run (Griese kick)	Tied 7-7
3	PUR	Kuzniewski 1-yard run (Griese kick)	PUR 14-7
4	PUR	Griese 19-yard field goal	PUR 17-7
4	IOWA	Wilder 4-yard pass from Snook (Anderson kick)	PUR 17-14

=== Michigan ===
Team	1	2	3	4	Total
• Purdue	0	0	14	3	17
Michigan	0	6	6	3	15

- Date: October 16
- Location: Michigan Stadium, Ann Arbor, MI

Scoring summary
2		MICH	Ward 17-yard run (kick failed)	MICH 6-0
3		PUR	Finley 24-yard pass from Griese (Griese kick)	PUR 7-6
3		PUR	Beirne 6-yard pass from Griese (Griese kick)	PUR 14-6
3		MICH	Clancy 40-yard pass from Gabler (run failed)	PUR 14-12
4		MICH	Sygar 18-yard field goal	MICH 15-14
4	0:55	PUR	Griese 35-yard field goal	PUR 17-15

=== Indiana ===
Team	1	2	3	4	Total
• Purdue	20	0	6	0	26
Indiana	0	14	7	0	21

- Date: November 20
- Location: Bloomington, IN

Scoring summary
1	PUR	Kuzniewski 6-yard run (Griese kick)	PUR 7-0
1	PUR	Teter 9-yard run (kick failed)	PUR 13-0
1	PUR	Kuzniewski 2-yard run (Griese kick)	PUR 20-0
2	IND	Malinchak 75-yard pass from Stavroff (kick failed)	PUR 20-6
2	IND	Malinchak 21-yard pass from Stavroff (Stavroff to Kalupa pass)	PUR 20-14
3	PUR	Griese 1-yard run (pass failed)	PUR 26-14
3	IND	Cole 13-yard run (Kornowa kick)	PUR 26-21

== Roster ==
1965 Purdue Boilermakers football team roster
Players
Coaches
Offense

Pos.	#	Name	Class
TE		Jim Beirne
OL		Jim Bonk
OL		Sal Ciampi
RB		Bob Corby
QB	12	Bob Griese
OL		Babe DiFilippo
OL		Charles Erlenbaugh
TE		Jim Faflik
WR		Jim Finley
WR		Bob Hadrick
OL		Jim Hales
QB		Doug Holcomb
OL		Bob Hopp
RB		Bob Hurst
OL		Larry Kaminski
OL		Chuck Kuzneski
RB		John Kuzniewski
RB		Jerry Mewha
RB		Randy Minniear
RB		Lou Sims
OL		Karl Singer
RB		Gordon Teter

Defense

Pos.	#	Name	Class
DL		Mike Barnes
LB		Francis Burke
DL		Jack Calcaterra
DB		George Catavolos
DB		John Charles
LB		Pat Conley
DB		Charles King
LB		Pat Labus
DL		Jim Long
DL		George Olion
DL		Jerry Shay
DL		Bob Sebeck
LB		Bob Yunaska

Special teams

Pos.	#	Name	Class

Head coach

- Jack Mollenkopf

Coordinators/assistant coaches

- Bob DeMoss
- Len Jardine
- Ned Maloney
- Ron Meyer

Legend

- (C) Team captain
- (S) Suspended
- (I) Ineligible
- Injured
- Redshirt
