= Ron Rector =

American football player (1944–1968)

No. 24, 29
- Position: Running back

Personal information
- Born: May 29, 1944; Akron, Ohio, U.S.
- Died: July 14, 1968 (aged 24); Columbus, Ohio, U.S.
- Listed height: 6 ft 0 in (1.83 m)
- Listed weight: 200 lb (91 kg)

Career information
- High school: Coventry (Akron)
- College: Northwestern (1962–1965)
- NFL draft: 1966: 9th round, 138th overall pick

Career history
- Washington Redskins (1966); Atlanta Falcons (1966–1967)

Awards and highlights
- Second-team All-Big Ten (1965)

Career NFL statistics
- Rushing yards: 167
- Rushing average: 5.1
- Receptions: 6
- Receiving yards: 22
- Stats at Pro Football Reference

Ronald S. Rector (May 29, 1944 – July 14, 1968) was an American football running back in the National Football League (NFL) for the Green Bay Packers, the Washington Redskins, and the Atlanta Falcons. He played college football at Northwestern University and was drafted in the ninth round of the 1966 NFL draft.

On June 29, 1968, Rector suffered a fractured skull and a concussion as a result of a motorcycle accident on Interstate 71 and died on July 14, 1968, as a result of these injuries.

== See also ==
- List of gridiron football players who died during their careers
