= Dave Long (American football) =

American football player (born 1944)

No. 89
- Positions: Defensive end, Defensive tackle

Personal information
- Born: September 6, 1944 (age 82); Jefferson, Iowa, U.S.
- Listed height: 6 ft 4 in (1.93 m)
- Listed weight: 245 lb (111 kg)

Career information
- High school: Thomas Jefferson
- College: Iowa
- NFL draft: 1966: 3rd round, 43rd overall pick
- AFL draft: 1966: 6th round, 45th overall pick

Career history
- St. Louis Cardinals (1966–1968); New Orleans Saints (1969–1972)

Awards and highlights
- First-team All-Big Ten (1965)

Career NFL statistics
- Fumble recoveries: 6
- Sacks: 15
- Stats at Pro Football Reference

David Frank Long (born September 6, 1944) is an American former professional football player who was a defensive tackle and defensive end in the National Football League (NFL) who played seven seasons for the St. Louis Cardinals and New Orleans Saints. Long played college football for the Iowa Hawkeyes, where he was named All-Big Ten as a senior. He was selected in the third round of the 1966 NFL draft with the 43rd overall pick, and in the sixth round of the 1966 American Football League draft, 45th overall.

== Early life ==
Long was born on September 6, 1944, in Jefferson, Iowa. He had four younger brothers. Long attended Thomas Jefferson High School in Cedar Rapids, Iowa. He played football and basketball in high school.

He was a center as a freshman football player, a tackle as a sophomore, and began his junior season at end. In his junior year on the football team (1960) he was switched from end to quarterback during the season. He was the team's starting quarterback as a senior (1961). He was reportedly an All-State quarterback for Jefferson as a senior. He was a second-team All-Mississippi Valley Conference quarterback in 1961. He led the Mississippi Valley Conference in passing as a senior, and the Cedar Rapids Gazette named him to its All-City first team.

Long was stated to be 6 ft 2 in (1.88 m) 198 lb (89.8 kb) in late August 1961, before the start of the football season; 6 ft 3 in (1.91 m) 200 lb (90.7 kg) in November; and 6 ft 3.5 in (1.92 m) 205 lb (93 kg) by late March 1962, during the basketball season. In 1962, Long was selected second-team All-State in basketball at guard by the Iowa Daily Press Association.

== College career ==
Long attended the University of Iowa, after being recruited by coach Jerry Burns. Long played defensive end under coach Burns for the Iowa Hawkeyes, in the Big Ten Conference. As a sophomore (1963), he became a starter on defense during the season. Long was the Hawkeyes' starting left defensive end as a junior in 1964. Notre Dame's No. 3 nationally ranked football team considered Long among the top players they faced in 1964. In one 1964 game, he had 11 unassisted tackles and eight assisted tackles.

In 1965, again starting at end, Long was considered a key to Iowa's defense. He also had to spend time on offense in 1965, due to injuries on the team. United Press International (UPI) named Long first-team All-Big Ten at defensive end in 1965. Long missed being named a UPI second-team All-American by one vote. The Associated Press recognized Long as an honorable mention All-Big Ten player in 1965. One of his teammates at Iowa was future Dallas Cowboys' offensive guard John Niland.

== Professional career ==
The St. Louis Cardinals selected Long in the third round of the 1966 NFL draft, 43rd overall. The Houston Oilers drafted him in the sixth round of the 1966 American Football League draft, 45th overall. Both drafts took place on the same day in late November 1965. In the first contract dispute between the two leagues that year, the Cardinals and Oilers each claimed that they had signed Long to a contract shortly after their drafts. Oilers' owner Bud Adams relented on his claim, and Long went on to play with the Cardinals.

While playing defensive end in his first preseason with the Cardinals, Long sacked future Hall of Fame quarterback Johnny Unitas during an exhibition game. Unitas patted Long on the helmet and said "Nice play, rook". This remained the emotional highlight of Long's career for a number of years. When his 1966 rookie season began, the Cardinals used Long as a defensive tackle, starting two of the 14 games in which he appeared. He had 1.5 quarterback sacks that season.

In 1967, coach Charley Winner played Long at defensive tackle and defensive end, playing both right and left defensive end. He started 13 games, with five sacks and one fumble recovery. Before signing his 1968 contract, Long expressed his strong preference to play tackle rather than end, as he did not think he had the speed that was necessary to play his best at defensive end. In 1968, however, Winner continued to use Long as a defensive end. Cardinals' defensive line coach Dick Voris worked with Long to improve his technique at defensive end. After starting three games, Long was replaced by Chuck Walker at right defensive end, with Bob Rowe taking over Walker's right defensive tackle position. Long did not start again that season and did not have a sack in 1968.

In February 1969, the Cardinals traded Long, Dick Kasperek, Brady Keys, and their 1969 second-round draft choice Richard Neal to the New Orleans Saints for receiver John Gilliam. In June 1969, the Cardinals traded Long and a draft pick to the Washington Redskins for quarterback Jim Ninowski. Future Hall of Fame coach Vince Lombardi, now with Washington after a long career in Green Bay, made the trade for Long. However, the trade was contingent on Ninowski agreeing to play for the Saints. When the Saints began their preseason in July, Ninowski did not come to training camp, the trade never finalized, and Long stayed with the Saints.

Long started all 14 games for the Saints at left defensive end in 1969, with two quarterback sacks. During Long's first year with the Saints, Doug Atkins started all 14 games at right defensive end for the Saints. This was Atkins final NFL season in a 17-year career. Atkins is in the Pro Football Hall of Fame and has been selected as one of the 100 greatest players of the NFL's first 100 years. During the 1969 season, Long and Atkins became close friends, and Long learned a great deal from Atkins about how to play football.

After Atkins' retired, Long was moved to right defensive end in 1970, starting 12 games with four sacks and one fumble recovery. In 1971, Saints' coach J. D. Roberts moved Long to right defensive tackle. Long started all 14 games, with four fumble recoveries and one sack that season. Roberts lauded Long's efforts as a team player, and for always hustling and being aggressive, whether in practice or in games. In a mid-October 1971 game against the Dallas Cowboys, Long playing right defensive tackle faced off directly opposite his former college teammate John Niland, who played left guard for the Cowboys.

In 1972, Long was moved back to right defensive end, starting seven games that season, with two sacks. This was his last season in the NFL. The Cardinals traded Long to the Buffalo Bills in August 1973 for an undisclosed draft choice. The Bills released Long before the start of the 1973 season.

Over his seven-year career, Long appeared in 96 games, starting 65 with 15 quarterback sacks and six fumble recoveries.

== Personal life ==
During his professional playing career, Long operated a construction business in Cedar Rapids. After retiring, he was a member of the football coaching staff at Coe College in Cedar Rapids in the mid-1970s. Later, Long was an assistant football coach at Padua Franciscan High School in Ohio. He was an instructor of theology at the school, located in Parma, Ohio, where he lived with his wife Terry and their four children. In the 2010s, he helped with youth football camps in Cedar Rapids.
