= Doug Van Horn =

American football player (born 1944)

No. 60, 61, 63
- Positions: Guard, Tackle

Personal information
- Born: June 24, 1944 (age 82); Sedalia, Missouri, U.S.
- Listed height: 6 ft 2 in (1.88 m)
- Listed weight: 245 lb (111 kg)

Career information
- High school: Eastmoor Academy (Columbus, Ohio)
- College: Ohio State (1962–1965)
- NFL draft: 1966: 4th round, 55th overall pick
- AFL draft: 1966: 5th round, 39th overall pick

Career history
- Detroit Lions (1966); Westchester Bulls (1967–1968); New York Giants (1968–1979)

Awards and highlights
- First-team All-American (1965); First-team All-Big Ten (1965)

Career NFL statistics
- Games played: 172
- Games started: 154
- Fumble recoveries: 7
- Stats at Pro Football Reference

Douglas Claydon Van Horn (born June 24, 1944) is an American former professional football player who was an offensive lineman in the National Football League (NFL) for the Detroit Lions and New York Giants. He played college football for the Ohio State Buckeyes, earning first-team All-American honors in 1965. Van Horn was selected in the fourth round of the 1966 NFL draft. He was also selected in the fifth round of the 1966 AFL draft by the Kansas City Chiefs. He earned the Giants starting right guard spot in 1969, playing in that role until he was switched to right tackle in 1974.
