= Tom Barrington =

American football player (1944–2002)

No. 31, 32
- Position: Running back

Personal information
- Born: January 29, 1944; Lima, Ohio, U.S.
- Died: November 8, 2002 (aged 58); Columbus, Ohio, U.S.
- Listed height: 6 ft 1 in (1.85 m)
- Listed weight: 213 lb (97 kg)

Career information
- High school: Lima (OH)
- College: Ohio State (1962-1965)
- NFL draft: 1966: 3rd round, 38th overall pick
- AFL draft: 1966: 16th round, 142nd overall pick

Career history
- Washington Redskins (1966); New Orleans Saints (1967–1970); Washington Redskins (1971)*
- * Offseason or practice squad member only

Awards and highlights
- Third-team All-American (1965); Second-team All-Big Ten (1965)

Career NFL statistics
- Rushing yards: 530
- Rushing average: 3.2
- Receptions: 41
- Receiving yards: 278
- Total touchdowns: 4
- Stats at Pro Football Reference

George Thomas Barrington (January 29, 1944 – November 8, 2002) was an American football running back in the National Football League (NFL) for the Washington Redskins and New Orleans Saints. He played college football at Ohio State University and was drafted in the third round of the 1966 NFL draft. Barrington was also selected in the sixteenth round of the 1966 AFL draft by the Kansas City Chiefs.

== See also ==
- List of NCAA major college yearly punt and kickoff return leaders
