= Ron Acks =

American football player (1944–2023)

- Acks in 1972

No. 52, 51, 57
- Position: Linebacker

Personal information
- Born: October 3, 1944; Herrin, Illinois, U.S.
- Died: November 21, 2023 (aged 79); Cornelius, North Carolina, U.S.
- Listed height: 6 ft 2 in (1.88 m)
- Listed weight: 214 lb (97 kg)

Career information
- High school: Carbondale Community
- College: Illinois (1964–1966)
- NFL draft: 1966: 4th round, 57th overall pick
- AFL draft: 1966: 16th round, 141st overall pick

Career history
- Atlanta Falcons (1968–1971); New England Patriots (1972–1973); Green Bay Packers (1974–1976)

Awards and highlights
- First-team All-Big Ten (1965)

Career NFL statistics
- Fumble recoveries: 5
- Interceptions: 2
- Touchdowns: 1
- Stats at Pro Football Reference

Ronald William Acks (October 3, 1944 – November 21, 2023) was an American professional football player who was a linebacker for nine seasons for the Atlanta Falcons, New England Patriots, and Green Bay Packers.

== Early life ==
Ron Acks was born October 3, 1944 in Herrin, Illinois. He grew up in neighboring Carbondale, where he attended Carbondale Community High School, where his football coach was Frank Bleyer.

== College career ==
In college, under head coach Pete Elliott he played running back on the 1963 and 1964 University of Illinois Fighting Illini, and switched to safety his senior year in 1965. He was a part of the University of Illinois Fighting Illini football team that beat the Washington Huskies at the January 1st 1964 Rose Bowl.

== Professional career ==
Acks was selected by the Minnesota Vikings in the fourth round of the 1966 NFL draft (57th pick overall). He was unable to land a position on the roster, however, and spent the 1966 and part of the 1967 season playing for the Des Moines franchise of the Professional Football League of America (PFLA).

Acks played linebacker for nine seasons in the National Football League (NFL) for the Atlanta Falcons, New England Patriots, and Green Bay Packers.

== Life after football, death, and legacy ==
Acks died at his home in Cornelius, North Carolina, on November 21, 2023, at the age of 79.

Acks was "inducted into the Carbondale Sports Hall of Fame" in 2012.
