= Aaron Brown (defensive lineman) =

American football player (1943–1997)

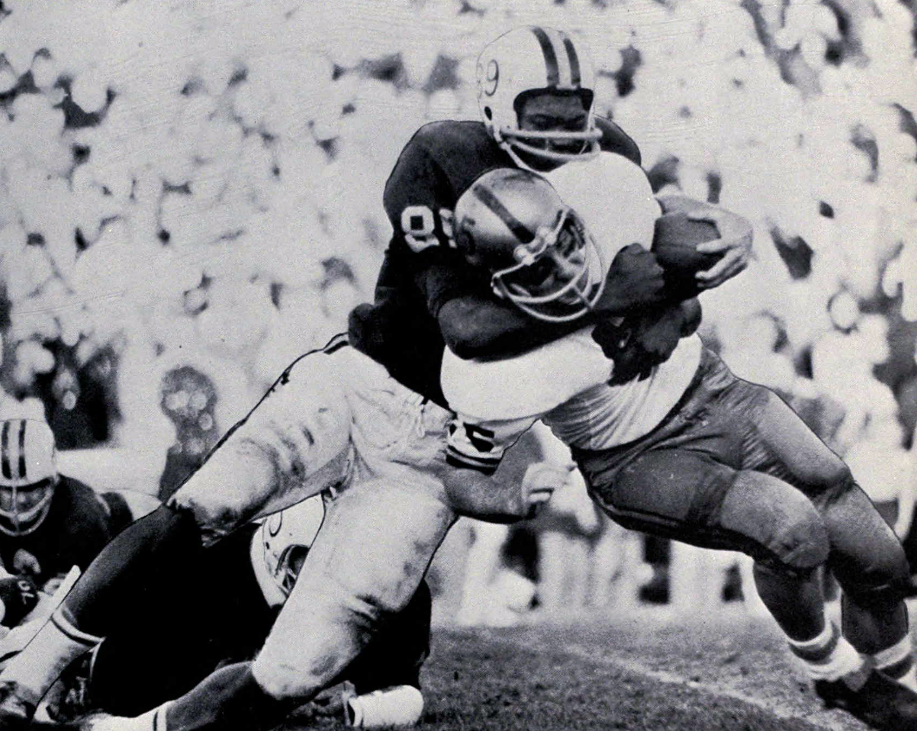
- Brown from the 1964 Gopher

No. 87
- Position: Defensive end

Personal information
- Born: November 16, 1943; Port Arthur, Texas, U.S.
- Died: November 15, 1997 (aged 53); Houston, Texas, U.S.
- Listed height: 6 ft 5 in (1.96 m)
- Listed weight: 255 lb (116 kg)

Career information
- High school: Abraham Lincoln (Port Arthur, Texas)
- College: Minnesota
- AFL draft: 1966: 1st round, 6th overall pick

Career history
- Kansas City Chiefs (1966–1972); Green Bay Packers (1973–1974)

Awards and highlights
- Super Bowl champion (IV); Consensus All-American (1965); Second-team All-American (1964); 2× First-team All-Big Ten (1964, 1965)

Career statistics
- Games played: 88
- Interceptions: 1
- Fumble recoveries: 7
- Stats at Pro Football Reference

Aaron Lewis Brown Jr. (November 16, 1943 – November 15, 1997) was an American football defensive lineman born in Port Arthur, Texas. Brown played for the Kansas City Chiefs from 1966 to 1972 and Green Bay Packers from 1973 to 1974. Brown is an alumnus of the University of Minnesota.

Brown was selected by the Kansas City Chiefs with their first round selection in the 1966 American Football League draft. Brown participated in the first AFL-NFL World Championship game with the team (later known as the Super Bowl). Three years later, Brown was on the 1969 Chiefs' team that won the final AFL-NFL World Championship.

Due to his speed of 4.7 in the 40 yard dash, Hank Stram, coach of the Chiefs, decided to try Brown at running back. Brown developed callouses on his thighs, which caused him to miss most of a season. Brown's greatest disappointment was failure to be in the starting lineup for Super Bowl I, when Stram decided to start Chuck Hurston at right end instead. In the 1969 AFL Championship, Brown registered 2.5 sacks in the Chiefs 17–7 victory over the Raiders. Brown made up for the missed Super Bowl I opportunity in Super Bowl IV, where he had one sack and tackled Minnesota quarterback Joe Kapp, forcing him to leave the game in the 4th quarter.

He died on November 15, 1997, in Houston, Texas, when struck from behind by a motorist after walking home one day before his 54th birthday.

== See also ==
- List of American Football League players
