= Don Hansen =

American football player (born 1944)

- Hansen in 1972

No. 55, 58
- Position: Linebacker

Personal information
- Born: August 20, 1944 (age 82); Millersburg, Indiana, U.S.
- Listed height: 6 ft 2 in (1.88 m)
- Listed weight: 235 lb (107 kg)

Career information
- High school: FJ Reitz (Evansville, Indiana)
- College: Illinois
- NFL draft: 1966: 3rd round, 42nd overall pick
- AFL draft: 1966: 7th round, 51st overall pick

Career history
- Minnesota Vikings (1966–1968); Atlanta Falcons (1969–1975); Seattle Seahawks (1976); Green Bay Packers (1976-1977)

Awards and highlights
- First-team All-Big Ten (1965)

Career NFL statistics
- Interceptions: 10
- Fumble recoveries: 13
- Touchdowns: 1
- Stats at Pro Football Reference

Donald Ray Hansen (born August 20, 1944) is an American former professional football player who was a linebacker in the National Football League (NFL) from 1966 to 1977. He was known as an extremely hard hitter and an underrated as well as overachieving linebacker.

Hansen was a member of FJ Reitz High School's legendary 1961 State Champion football team. He played college football for the Illinois Fighting Illini, who won the 1964 Rose Bowl. He was selected by the Minnesota Vikings in the third round of the 1966 NFL draft. He was also chosen by the Miami Dolphins in the seventh round of the 1966 AFL draft.
