= 1965 All-Big Ten Conference football team =

American college football all-star team

The 1965 All-Big Ten Conference football team consists of American football players chosen by various organizations for All-Big Ten Conference teams for the 1965 Big Ten Conference football season. Players receiving All-Big Ten honors in 1965 included six players who were also recognized as consensus All-Americans: Aaron Brown, Jim Grabowski, Bob Griese, Bubba Smith, George Webster, and Bill Yearby. Eleven players from the 1965 Michigan State Spartans football team received first- or second-team All-Big Ten honors.

== Offensive selections ==
=== Quarterbacks ===
- Steve Juday, Michigan State (AP-1, UPI-2)
- Bob Griese, Purdue (AP-2, UPI-1)

=== Running backs ===
- Jim Grabowski, Illinois (AP-1, UPI-1 [fb])
- Clinton Jones, Michigan State (AP-1, UPI-1 [hb])
- Carl Ward, Michigan (AP-1, UPI-1 [hb])
- Tom Barrington, Ohio State (AP-2, UPI-2 [hb])
- Bob McKelvey, Northwestern (AP-2)
- Bob Apisa, Michigan State (AP-2, UPI-2 [fb])
- Ron Rector, Northwestern (UPI-2 [hb])

=== Ends ===
- Gene Washington, Michigan State (AP-1, UPI-1)
- Bob Hadrick, Purdue (AP-1, UPI-2)
- Bill Malinchak, Indiana (AP-2)
- Cas Banaszek, Northwestern (AP-2)
- Jack Clancy, Michigan (UPI-2)

=== Tackles ===
- Tom Mack, Michigan (AP-1, UPI-1)
- Karl Singer, Purdue (AP-1, UPI-1)
- Gale Gillingham, Minnesota (AP-2, UPI-2)
- Jim Burns, Northwestern (AP-2)
- Jerry West, Michigan State (UPI-2)
- Charles Kines, Michigan (UPI-2)

=== Guards ===
- John Niland, Iowa (AP-1, UPI-1)
- Doug Van Horn, Ohio State (AP-1, UPI-1)
- Paul Faust, Minnesota (AP-2, UPI-2)
- John Karpinski, Michigan State (AP-2, UPI-2)

=== Centers ===
- Larry Kaminski, Purdue (AP-1, UPI-2)
- Ray Pryor, Ohio State (UPI-1)
- Boris Dmitroff, Michigan State (AP-2)

== Defensive selections ==
=== Ends ===
- Aaron Brown, Minnesota (AP-1, UPI-1 [offense])
- Bubba Smith, Michigan State (AP-1, UPI-1)
- David Long, Iowa (UPI-1)
- Bo Batchelder, Illinois (AP-2, UPI-2)
- Jim Long, Purdue (AP-2, UPI-2)

=== Tackles ===
- Bill Yearby, Michigan (AP-1, UPI-1)
- Jerry Shay, Purdue (AP-1, UPI-1)
- Gary Eickman, Illinois (AP-2)
- Bill Briggs, Iowa (UPI-2)

=== Guards ===
- Harold Lucas, Michigan State (AP-2 [lb], UPI-1)
- William Ridder, Ohio State (AP-2, UPI-2)

=== Linebackers ===
- Ike Kelley, Ohio State (AP-1, UPI-1)
- Don Hansen, Illinois (AP-1, UPI-1)
- Ron Goovert, Michigan State (AP-1, UPI-2)
- Jack Calcaterra, Purdue (AP-2)
- Tom Cecchini, Michigan (AP-2, UPI-2)
- Dan Hilsabeck, Iowa (UPI-2)

=== Defensive backs ===
- Rich Volk, Michigan (AP-1, UPI-1 [s])
- George Webster, Michigan State (AP-1, UPI-1 [lb])
- Ron Acks, Illinois (AP-1, UPI-2 [hb])
- John Fill, Ohio State (AP-1)
- Don Japinga, Michigan State (AP-2, UPI-1 [hb])
- Charles King, Purdue (UPI-1 [hb])
- John Charles, Purdue (AP-2, UPI-2 [hb])
- Tom Sakal, Minnesota (AP-2)
- Tom Brigham, Wisconsin (AP-2)
- Mike Buckner, Northwestern (UPI-2 [s])

== Key ==
AP = Associated Press

UPI = United Press International

Bold = First-team selection of both the AP and UPI

== See also ==
- 1965 College Football All-America Team
