= List of Nebraska Cornhuskers football All-Americans =

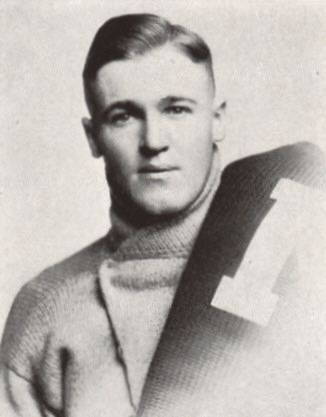
Guy Chamberlin became Nebraska's first consensus All-American in 1915

This is a list of Nebraska Cornhuskers football All-Americans who have been selected as a first-team All-American by one or more selectors.

Nebraska has produced 97 players who have earned 111 first-team, fifty-five consensus, and twenty-one unanimous All-Americans. Tackle Vic Halligan was named Nebraska's first All-American in 1914. The following year, end Guy Chamberlin became a consensus All-American, one who appears on over half of All-America lists from recognized selectors. Thirteen Cornhuskers have been named an All-American multiple times, most recently offensive lineman Aaron Taylor. From 1963 to 2003, there were just three seasons in which NU did not have at least one player selected as an All-American.

== List of All-Americans ==
Consensus	Unanimous

Year	Player	Position
1914	Vic Halligan	T
1915	Guy Chamberlin	E
1924	Ed Weir	T
1925	Ed Weir (2)	T
1926	Lonnie Stiner	T
1928	Danny McMullen	G
1929	Ray Richards	T
1930	Hugh Rhea	T
1932	Lawrence Ely	C
1933	George Sauer	FB
1936	Sam Francis	FB
1937	Fred Shirey	T
1937	Charley Brock	C
1940	Warren Alfson	G
1940	Forrest Behm	T
1949	Tom Novak	C
1950	Bobby Reynolds	HB
1952	Jerry Minnick	T
1963	Bob Brown	OT
1964	Larry Kramer	T
1965	Freeman White	E
1965	Walter Barnes	T
1965	Tony Jeter	E
1966	LaVerne Allers	G
1966	Larry Wachholtz	DB
1966	Wayne Meylan	MG
1967	Wayne Meylan (2)	MG
1968	Joe Armstrong	G
1970	Jerry Murtaugh	LB
1970	Bob Newton	T
1971	Jeff Kinney	HB
1971	Larry Jacobson	DT
1971	Jerry Tagge	QB
1971	Rich Glover	MG
1971	Willie Harper	DE
1971	Johnny Rodgers	WB
1972	Rich Glover	MG
1972	Willie Harper (2)	DE
1972	Johnny Rodgers (2)	WB
1972	Daryl White	OT
1973	John Dutton	DT
1973	Daryl White (2)	OT
1974	Rik Bonness	C
1974	Marvin Crenshaw	OT
1974	David Humm	QB
1975	Rik Bonness (2)	C
1975	Bob Martin	DE
1975	Wonder Monds	DB
1976	Dave Butterfield	DB
1976	Vince Ferragamo	QB
1976	Mike Fultz	DT
1977	Tom Davis	C
1978	Kelvin Clark	OT
1978	George Andrews	DE
1979	Junior Miller	TE
1980	Derrie Nelson	DE
1980	Jarvis Redwine	IB
1980	Randy Schleusener	OG
1981	Dave Rimington	C
1981	Jimmy Williams	DE
1982	Dave Rimington (2)	C
1982	Mike Rozier	IB
1983	Irving Fryar	WB
1983	Mike Rozier (2)	IB
1983	Dean Steinkuhler	OG
1984	Bret Clark	DB
1984	Harry Grimminger	OG
1984	Mark Traynowicz	C
1985	Bill Lewis	C
1985	Jim Skow	T
1986	Danny Noonan	MG
1987	John McCormick	OG
1987	Neil Smith	DT
1987	Steve Taylor	QB
1987	Broderick Thomas	LB
1988	Broderick Thomas (2)	LB
1988	Jake Young	C
1989	Doug Glaser	OT
1989	Jake Young (2)	C
1990	Kenny Walker	DT
1992	Travis Hill	LB
1992	Will Shields	OG
1993	Trev Alberts	LB
1994	Brenden Stai	OG
1994	Ed Stewart	LB
1994	Zach Wiegert	OT
1995	Tommie Frazier	QB
1995	Aaron Graham	C
1995	Jared Tomich	DE
1996	Aaron Taylor	C
1996	Jared Tomich (2)	DE
1996	Grant Wistrom	DE
1997	Jason Peter	DT
1997	Aaron Taylor (2)	OG
1997	Grant Wistrom (2)	DE
1999	Mike Brown	DB
1999	Ralph Brown	DB
2000	Russ Hochstein	OG
2000	Carlos Polk	LB
2000	Dominic Raiola	C
2001	Keyuo Craver	DB
2001	Eric Crouch	QB
2001	Toniu Fonoti	OG
2002	DeJuan Groce	PR
2003	Josh Bullocks	DB
2003	Kyle Larson	P
2009	Ndamukong Suh	DT
2010	Prince Amukamara	DB
2010	Alex Henery	K
2011	Lavonte David	LB
2025	Emmett Johnson	RB/AP
