= 1966 Notre Dame vs. Michigan State football game =

1966 Notre Dame vs. Michigan State
- Non-conference game National Championship Game (Note: Through luck and fortuitous scheduling, a "national championship game" was occasionally able to settle the matter on the field, as described in some contemporaneous reports. Despite the promotional billing, in several instances there were plausible scenarios for a third team to be selected as national champion by the major selectors, depending on outcomes of other games.) (Note: The following week Notre Dame defeated USC in its last regular season game.) "Game of the Century"
| Notre Dame Fighting Irish | Michigan State Spartans |
| (8–0) | (9–0) |
| Independent | Big Ten |
| 10 | 10 |
| Head coach: Ara Parseghian | Head coach: Duffy Daugherty |
| AP / Coaches; 1 / 1 | AP / Coaches; 2 / 2 |
| | 1 | 2 | 3 | 4 | Total |
|---|---|---|---|---|---|
| Notre Dame | 0 | 7 | 0 | 3 | 10 |
| Michigan State | 0 | 10 | 0 | 0 | 10 |
- Date: November 19, 1966
- Season: 1966
- Stadium: Spartan Stadium
- Location: East Lansing, Michigan
- Referee: Howard Wirtz

United States TV coverage
- Network: ABC
- Announcers: Chris Schenkel and Bud Wilkinson

The 1966 Notre Dame vs. Michigan State football game is considered one of the greatest and most controversial games in college football history played between Michigan State and Notre Dame. The game was played in Michigan State's Spartan Stadium on November 19, 1966. Notre Dame was coached by Ara Parseghian and Michigan State was coached by Duffy Daugherty, both school legends. Michigan State entered the contest 9–0 and ranked No. 2, while Notre Dame entered 8–0 and ranked No. 1. The game ended in a 10–10 tie.

The late-season clash between the top-ranked teams was billed as the year's national championship game. After the tie, and following their final game vs. USC, Notre Dame was selected as national champions by the AP Poll and UPI Coaches Poll and was awarded the Grantland Rice Trophy by the Football Writers Association of America. The National Football Foundation split their national championship, awarding the MacArthur Bowl jointly to Michigan State and Notre Dame.

== Introduction ==
Notre Dame entered the contest ranked No. 1 both the AP and Coaches' polls. Defending National Champion Michigan State, who had finished the 1965 season No. 1 in the UPI Coaches' poll, but was upset by UCLA in the Rose Bowl the previous year, entered the game ranked No. 2 in the polls. The Fighting Irish, whose bid for a national championship two years earlier was snuffed out by Southern Cal, were hungry, while the Spartans had history and home-field advantage on their side. This was the first time in 20 years that a college football matchup was given the "Game of the Century" tag by the national media, and ABC had the nation's viewers in its grip, with equal parts Notre Dame fans and Michigan State fans. It was the tenth time in the 30-year history of the AP poll that the No. 1 team played the No. 2 team. The Spartans had defeated Notre Dame the prior year 12–3 holding Notre Dame to minus-12 yards rushing.

A fortuitous quirk in scheduling brought these two teams together late in the season. They were not even supposed to meet when the 1966 schedules were first drawn up. Michigan State had only nine games scheduled (even though they were allowed to have ten; the Big Ten did not allow teams to schedule ten regular season games until 1965) while Notre Dame was originally scheduled to play Iowa that week, as had been the custom since 1945. However, in 1960, the Hawkeyes suddenly dropped the Irish from their schedule, from 1964 onward (the 1963 Notre Dame-Iowa game was cancelled following the assassination of John F. Kennedy). Michigan State was available and agreed to return to Notre Dame's schedule in 1965–66.

The game was not shown live on national TV, and it was not supposed to be seen on TV at all. Each team was allotted one national television appearance and two regional television appearances each season. Notre Dame had used their national TV slot in the season opening game against Purdue and Michigan State had used their regional TV slot against Purdue. ABC executives did not even want to show the game anywhere but the regional area, but pressure from the West Coast and the South (to the tune of 50,000 letters) made ABC air the game on tape delay. ABC relented and blacked out the Michigan State-Notre Dame game in two states (reportedly North Dakota and South Dakota), so it could technically be called a regional broadcast. It would also be the first time a college football game was broadcast live to Hawaii and to U.S. troops in Vietnam on the Intelsat II F-1 satellite; at halftime, the link was reversed and ABC broadcast a 90-second film of sunbathers at the Hawaiian Village Hotel to the nation. The official attendance was announced at 80,011 (111% capacity) and was the most attended game in Michigan State football history at the time (the current record is 80,401 on Sept. 22, 1990 vs. Notre Dame).

The ABC broadcast was watched by 33 million viewers and had a 22.5 rating, but it was not televised again for 37 years until ESPN Classic re-aired it on November 27, 2003. Discovered in an ABC library vault two years earlier in 2001, the telecast footage is mostly intact with the exception of the missing first quarter.

== Game summary ==
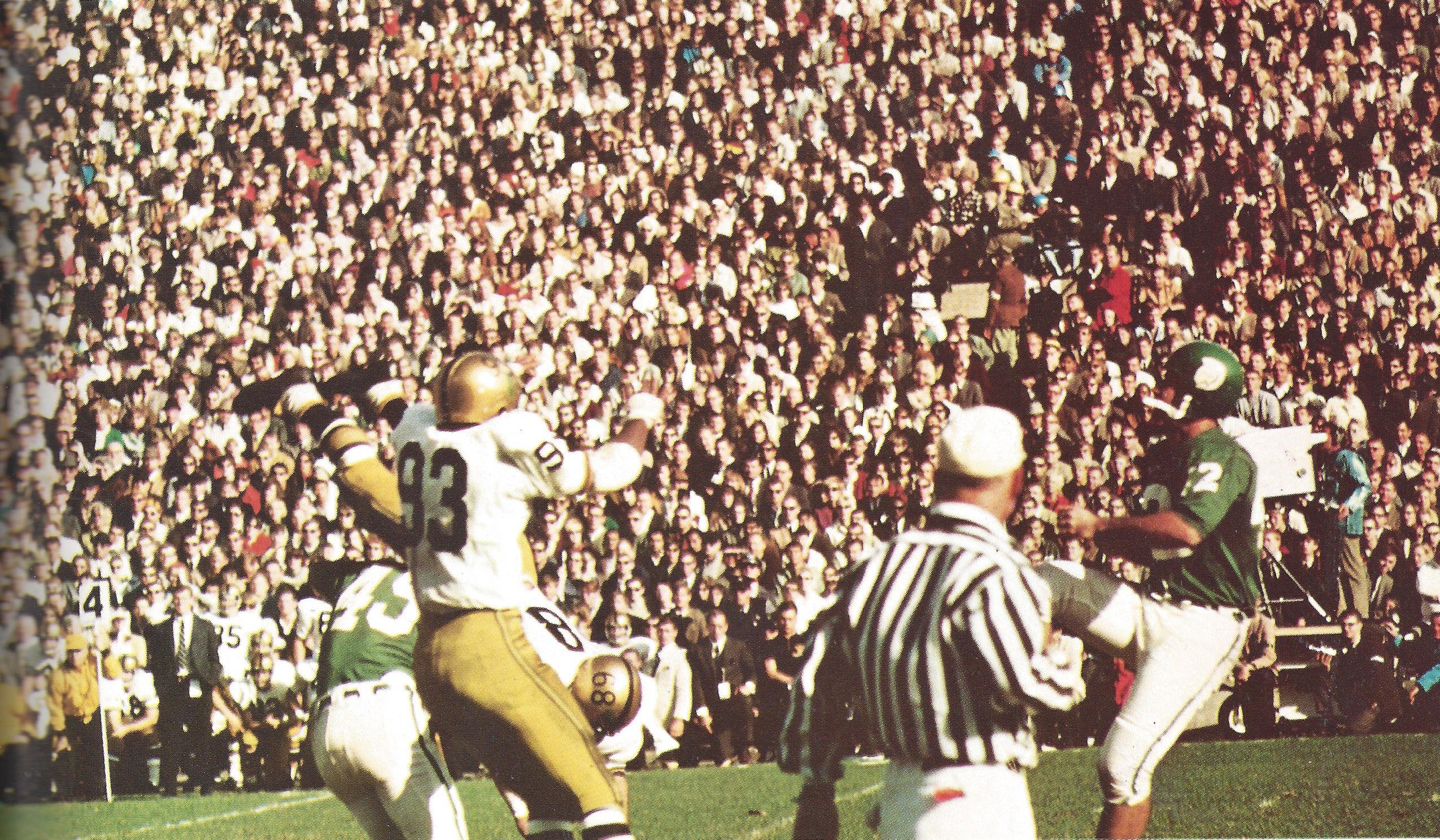
Dick Kenney kicks a field goal to give the Spartans a 10–0 lead.

Before and during the game, Notre Dame was mired in injury problems: Irish quarterback Terry Hanratty was knocked out after getting sacked in the first quarter by Spartan defensive lineman Bubba Smith. Starting Notre Dame running back Nick Eddy was out entirely after hurting his shoulder by slipping on ice while getting off the train in East Lansing. Center George Goeddeke wrenched his ankle on a punt play.

Michigan State jumped out to a 7–0 lead behind a five-yard touchdown run by Regis Cavender early in the second quarter. Later in the half, MSU added a field goal (by barefooted Hawaiian Dick Kenney). But the Irish came back, quickly scoring a touchdown on a 34-yard pass thrown by backup quarterback Coley O'Brien over the outstretched hand of MSU safety Jess Phillips to halfback Bob Gladieux. MSU took a 10–7 lead into the locker room at the half.

Notre Dame started the second half in prime position to score after recovering a fumble on the Michigan State 32-yard line on the Spartans' first play from scrimmage. However, the Irish gave the ball right back to MSU on an interception.

Perhaps the best second-half scoring opportunity for MSU occurred during a pass thrown from Jimmy Raye to Gene Washington. The speedy wide receiver had outrun Raye's deep pass and Notre Dame's defensive backfield. Washington was forced to double back, and in so doing was caught by the defense.

Notre Dame tied the game on the first play of the fourth quarter on Joe Azzaro's 28-yard field goal. Tom Schoen's second interception on consecutive plays from scrimmage by Michigan State put Notre Dame in a position to take the lead, but Azzaro's 41-yard field goal attempt with 4:38 left on the clock missed by inches to the right.

After a Michigan State punt Notre Dame had the ball on its own 30-yard line with 1:24 left. They needed about 40 yards for a game-winning field goal. But coach Ara Parseghian, not wanting to risk a turnover that could hand the game to the Spartans, chose to run the ball four times—including on fourth down, which Notre Dame converted from its own 39-yard line. Michigan State called three time-outs in an unsuccessful attempt to perhaps get the ball back and start a potential game-winning drive of their own.

After making a first down with ten seconds left, O'Brien dropped back to pass, but was sacked by Bubba Smith. On the last play of the game, O'Brien gained five yards on a quarterback sneak. The game ended in a 10–10 tie.

== Notre Dame play-calling controversy ==
Ara Parseghian's decision to run the ball on five of six plays in the last one-and-a-half minutes drew criticism from some fans and sportswriters, who argued he should have played more aggressively to either win the game or risk losing it, and left some fans feeling disappointed at the game not having a more definitive resolution. Echoing one of the great idioms of Notre Dame lore, college football expert Dan Jenkins led off his article on the game for Sports Illustrated by sarcastically saying that Parseghian chose to "Tie one for the Gipper". Jenkins concluded that Parseghian "felt arrogantly sure that Notre Dame could win the polls with a tie, not just over Michigan State but also over an undefeated and untied Alabama".

Until his death in 2017, however, Parseghian defended his end-of-the-game strategy. According to the same article, Parseghian cited his team's field position and the dynamics of the game as reasons why he hadn't played more aggressively: "We'd fought hard to come back and tie it up. After all that, I didn't want to risk giving it to them cheap. They get reckless and it could cost them the game. I wasn't going to do a jackass thing like that at this point. [...] My starting quarterback, starting center, starting left tackle and all my top guys were over on the bench with me. We hadn't completed a pass in the last seven or eight attempts."

== Aftermath ==
The presidents of each school, Notre Dame’s Father Theodore Hesburgh and MSU’s John Hannah, together went into each locker room to console and congratulate the players. The two visionary leaders served for several years on a leadership Commission beginning in the late 1950s and sat together during the MSU-Notre Dame battles.

The tie resulted in 9–0–1 seasons for both Michigan State and Notre Dame. The final AP and Coaches' polls put the Irish and Spartans at No. 1 and No. 2, ranking both teams above the undefeated, and two-time defending national champion 11–0–0 Alabama. Both schools shared the MacArthur Bowl.

Notre Dame beat USC 51–0 the next week, completing an undefeated (but tied) regular season and solidifying its No. 1 claim. The Irish did not accept bowl bids between 1926 and 1969 (see below), and Michigan State was the victim of two Big Ten rules that would be rescinded a few years later: The same school could not represent the league in the Rose Bowl in back-to-back seasons (rescinded in December 1971, effective for the 1972 season), and no Big Ten school could play in a bowl game other than the Rose Bowl (rescinded for the 1975 season). So despite being Big Ten Champions and undefeated in the regular season, the Spartans could not play in the Rose Bowl, or indeed any bowl game.

Players for both schools earned tremendous accolades for the season including All American honors. In the 1967 NFL/AFL draft, Michigan State had four players drafted within the first eight picks of the first round.

After (but not necessarily as a result of) Eddy's injury while debarking from the train in East Lansing, Notre Dame football never traveled to away games by train again. Both teams now make the 160-mile trip by bus.

== Legacy ==
=== 40th anniversary ===
On September 23, 2006, Michigan State and Notre Dame commemorated the 40th anniversary of the game. Michigan State wore "throwback" jerseys and helmets from the 1960s era. Notre Dame declined to wear throwback jerseys or helmets. 45 members from the original '66 squad returned. In addition, 1965 and 1966 All American Bubba Smith had his No. 95 jersey retired at halftime, becoming only the third person in Michigan State history with such an honor. Notre Dame won the game 40–37, after coming back from a 16-point deficit and scoring 19 straight points to win.

=== 50th anniversary ===
On September 17, 2016, Notre Dame commemorated the 50th anniversary of the game. Members of the 1966 Notre Dame team appeared on the field prior to the game. Michigan State won the game 36-28, in a season where both teams disappointed with losing campaigns.
