= Eric Hansen =

Eric Hansen may refer to:

- Eric Hansen (chess player) (born 1992), Canadian-American chess player
- Eric Hansen (drummer), American drummer
- Eric Hansen (sportswriter), American sportswriter
- Eric Hansen (travel writer), American author
- Eric Hansen (wrestler) (1934–1978), Danish wrestler
- Eric T. Hansen (born 1960), American writer in Germany
- Eric Hansen (character), from Malcolm in the Middle

== See also ==
- Erik Hansen (disambiguation)
- Erik Hanson (disambiguation)
