= North–South Shrine Game =

Annual postseason college football game

North–South Shrine Game (defunct)
- Mahi Shrine's North–South; College All-Star Football Game
- Program cover from 1967 game
- Stadium: Orange Bowl (1948–1973); Silverdome (1976)
- Location: Miami, Florida (1948–1973); Pontiac, Michigan (1976)
- Operated: 1948–1973, 1976

Sponsors
- Shriners

The North–South Shrine Game was an annual postseason college football all-star game played each December from 1948 to 1973 in Miami, and a final time in 1976 in Pontiac, Michigan. The game was sponsored by the fraternal group Shriners International, with proceeds used to support the Shriners Hospitals for Crippled Children. The full name of the game when played in Miami, as listed on programs, was the Mahi Shrine's North–South College All-Star Football Game.

== History ==
In the early 1930s, there were several college all-star charity games organized between North and South teams. These were held in various locations, and benefitted different charitable causes. While listed in NCAA records, these games were unrelated to the series started in Florida after World War II.

The first two playings of the Miami-based Shrine game, in 1946 and 1947, were contested between high school football teams. Lynn Classical High School from Massachusetts, led by future Boston Red Sox player Harry Agganis, won the first game, while Miami High School won the second game. In October 1948, game organizers announced their intent to invite college football players, noting "there will be enough players for both of us", in reference to the Blue–Gray Football Classic being played in Montgomery, Alabama. Andy Gustafson of Miami and Herman Hickman of Yale, who would both be inducted to the College Football Hall of Fame, were signed to five-year contracts to coach the South and North teams, respectively.

After switching to a college all-star format, the game drew many top players and coaches during its history, such as George Blanda as South quarterback in 1948, and Ara Parseghian as North head coach in 1958. The 1964 game featured two Heisman Trophy winners; John Huarte, that year's recipient, and Roger Staubach, who had won the award in 1963 as a junior. Organizers sought to make the games competitive, including a special rule that allowed a team to receive a kickoff after scoring, if they were still trailing.

The 1956 game created some controversy, when singer Harry Belafonte was invited, and then apparently uninvited, to perform the national anthem before the game. Belafonte felt the incident was racially motivated, which game organizers denied; Belafonte was ultimately allowed to sing, although without accompaniment. At the time, the game was still segregated, as African-American players were not included on the South team until Willie Richardson and Bob Paremore in 1962. In the 1962 game, Richardson was selected as South team MVP, and Paremore received the game's sportsmanship award.

The Shrine executive committee voted to discontinue the Miami-based games after 1973, due to sparse attendance and the failure to secure a national television contract. Organizers in Michigan cited scheduling difficulties and a desire "to solicit a TV package", in not continuing the game beyond 1976.

A similar game, the East–West Shrine Game, has been played since 1925.

== Game results ==
=== Early years: college all-star teams ===
Date	Winner	Score	Attendance	Stadium	City	Organizer	Ref.
January 1, 1930	North	21–12	20,000	Grant Field	Atlanta	Yaarab Temple (Shriners)	
December 28, 1930	South	7–0	2,000	Ebbets Field	New York City	Knights of Columbus	
December 10, 1932	South	7–6	500	Baltimore Stadium	Baltimore	Mayor Howard W. Jackson	
December 24, 1933	North	3–0	5,000	Brooklyn Sports Stadium	New York City	American Legion	
January 1, 1934	North	7–0	12,000	Shields–Watkins Field	Knoxville, Tennessee	Shriners	

Notes:

The January 1930 game was a Southern Conference all-star game.
The January 1934 game was a Southeastern Conference all-star game.

=== Shrine games: high school teams ===
No.	Date	North team		South team		Attendance	Ref.
1	December 25, 1946	Lynn Classical High School (MA)	21	Granby High School (VA)	14	18,138	
2	December 25, 1947	McKeesport High School (PA)	14	Miami High School (FL)	34	26,430	

Quarterbacks in the 1946 game were Harry Agganis for Lynn Classical and Chuck Stobbs for Granby; both went on to play in major-league baseball.

=== Shrine games: college all-star teams ===
No.	Date	Winner	Score	Attendance
3	December 25, 1948	South	24–14	33,056
4	December 26, 1949	North	20–14	37,378
5	December 25, 1950	South	14–9	39,132
6	December 25, 1951	South	35–7	39,995
7	December 25, 1952	Tie	21–21	42,866
8	December 25, 1953	South	20–0	44,715
9	December 25, 1954	South	20–17	37,847
10	December 26, 1955	South	20–7	42,179
11	December 26, 1956	North	17–7	39,181
12	December 25, 1957	North	23–20	28,303
13	December 27, 1958	South	49–20	35,519
14	December 26, 1959	North	27–17	35,185
15	December 26, 1960	North	41–14	26,146

No.	Date	Winner	Score	Attendance
16	December 25, 1961	South	35–16	18,892
17	December 22, 1962	South	15–14	16,952
18	December 21, 1963	South	23–14	19,120
19	December 25, 1964	North	37–30	29,124
20	December 25, 1965	South	21–14	25,640
21	December 26, 1966	North	27–14	28,569
22	December 25, 1967	North	24–0	17,400
23	December 25, 1968	North	3–0	18,063
24	December 25, 1969	North	31–10	23,527
25	December 25, 1970	North	28–7	15,402
26	December 27, 1971	South	7–6	18,640
27	December 25, 1972	North	17–10	18,013
28	December 25, 1973	South	27–6	10,672
29	December 17, 1976	South	24–0	41,627

Notes:

Overall record for Shrine games: South (14–12–1) in college games; South (15–13–1) including high school games.
All Shrine games played at the Miami Orange Bowl, except for the 1976 game, which was played at the Pontiac Silverdome.
The date of the 1949 game is incorrectly listed as December 25 in NCAA records; the game was played on Monday, December 26.

== MVPs ==
†	Inducted into the College Football Hall of Fame

Year played	North			South			Ref.
Year played	Player	Pos.	College	Player	Pos.	College	Ref.
1948	no selection						
1949	Ralph Pasquariello	FB	Villanova	no selection			
1950	Gil Stephenson	FB	Army	John Ford	QB	Hardin–Simmons	
1951	John Turco	HB	Holy Cross	Bill Wade	QB	Vanderbilt	
1952	Donn Moomaw†	LB	UCLA	Jack Scarbath†	QB	Maryland	
1953	Ken Miller	FB	Illinois	Crawford Mims	G	Ole Miss	
1954	Alan Ameche†	FB	Wisconsin	Dick Bielski	FB	Maryland	
1955	Don Holleder	E	Army	George Welsh†	QB	Navy	
1956	Tommy McDonald†	HB	Oklahoma	Billy Ray Barnes	FB	Wake Forest	
1957	Jim Ninowski	QB	Michigan State	Dick Christy	HB	NC State	
1958	Pete Dawkins†	HB	Army	Buddy Humphrey	QB	Baylor	
1959	Joe Caldwell	QB	Army	Dan Edgington	E	Florida	
1960	Bill Brown	HB	Illinois	Bobby Skelton	QB	Alabama	
1961	Larry Onesti	C	Northwestern	Bobby Ply	QB	Baylor	
1962	Jerry Gross	QB	Detroit Mercy	Willie Richardson†	WR	Jackson State	
1963	Jack Concannon	QB	Boston College	George Mira	QB	Miami (FL)	
1964	John Huarte†	QB	Notre Dame	Bob Hayes	SE	Florida A&M	
1965	Nick Rassas	S/PR	Notre Dame	Ed Weisacosky	LB	Miami (FL)	
1966	Pete Duranko	DT	Notre Dame	Gene Trosch	DT	Miami (FL)	
1967	Dennis Coyne	LB	Northwestern	Gordon Lambert	DE	Tennessee-Martin	
1968	Bob Gladieux	RB	Notre Dame	Bill Bergey	LB	Arkansas State	
1969	Bruce Van Ness	RB	Rutgers	Clovis Swinney	G	Arkansas State	
1970	Lynn Dickey	QB	Kansas State	Dave Elmendorf†	S	Texas A&M	
1971	Keith Schroeder	LB	Iowa State	Joe Federspiel	LB	Kentucky	
1972	Rufus Ferguson	RB	Wisconsin	Chuck Foreman	RB	Miami (FL)	
1973	Gerald Tinker	WR	Kent State	Jimmy Allen	CB	UCLA	
1976	Tom Hannon	S	Michigan State	Steve Pisarkiewicz	QB	Missouri	

Most MVP selections (college): 4, accomplished by Army, Notre Dame, and Miami (FL).

=== Sportsmanship award ===
(awarded intermittently)

Year played	Player	Pos.	College	Team	Ref.
1950	Herb Hannah^{note}	OT	Alabama	South	
1951	Bill Wade	QB	Vanderbilt	South	
1955	Jack Losch	HB	Miami (FL)	South	
1958	Billy Stacy	HB	Mississippi State	South	
1961	Larry Wilson	SE	Miami (FL)	South	
1962	Bob Paremore	HB	Florida A&M	South	

^ Herb Hannah was the father of John Hannah.

== See also ==
- List of college bowl games
