= Kevin Hardy =

Kevin Hardy may refer to:

- Kevin Hardy (linebacker) (born 1973), former American football linebacker
- Kevin Hardy (defensive tackle) (1945–2024), former American football defensive tackle
