= Martine Bercher =

American football player (1944–2005)

No. 17 (Arkansas)
- Position: Defensive back

Personal information
- Born: February 23, 1944; Fort Smith, Arkansas, U.S.
- Died: December 7, 2005 (aged 61); Fort Smith, Arkansas, U.S.

Career information
- College: Arkansas
- NFL draft: 1967: 6th round, 151st overall pick

Career history
- Atlanta Falcons (1967); Minnesota Vikings (1968)

Awards and highlights
- National champion (1964); First-team All-American (1966); First-team All-SWC (1966); University of Arkansas Sports Hall of Honor; University of Arkansas All Century Team; Arkansas Sports Hall of Fame Class of 2009

Martine Bercher (February 23, 1944 – December 7, 2005) was an American football defensive back for the University of Arkansas Razorbacks football team from 1962-1966. He was a member of the 1964 National Championship team that won the 1965 Cotton Bowl Classic, and was named to the University of Arkansas All Century Team in 1994.

== Arkansas ==
Bercher attended the University of Arkansas from 1962 to 1966, where he would become an All-American. Bercher played under Frank Broyles as a defensive back, and was a sophomore on the 1964 National Championship team.

== NFL ==
=== Atlanta Falcons ===
Bercher was drafted in the sixth round with the 151st overall pick by the Atlanta Falcons in the 1967 NFL/AFL draft. He was with the Falcons for only the 1967 NFL season.

=== Minnesota Vikings ===
Bercher became a member of the Minnesota Vikings for 1968. This would be the Fort Smith natives' final year of professional football.

== After football ==
Catholic High School hired Bercher as a teacher and assistant football coach in 1969. He moved back to Fort Smith to care for his ill father-in-law in 1972. Bercher would re-open his father-in-law's restaurant and operate it for over 30 years until his death in 2005.
