= Dick Swatland =

American football player (1945–2022)

No. 64
- Position: Guard

Personal information
- Born: October 8, 1945; Stamford, Connecticut, U.S.
- Died: April 9, 2022 (aged 76); Stamford, Connecticut, U.S.
- Listed height: 6 ft 2 in (1.88 m)
- Listed weight: 245 lb (111 kg)

Career information
- High school: Stamford Catholic
- College: Notre Dame
- NFL draft: 1968: 8th round, 195th overall pick

Career history
- New Orleans Saints (1968)*; Houston Oilers (1968–1969); Bridgeport Jets (1969); Washington Redskins (1970)*; New England Patriots (1971)*; Hamilton Tiger-Cats (1971)
- * Offseason or practice squad member only

Awards and highlights
- National champion (1966); Second-team All-American (1967)

Career AFL statistics
- Games played: 4
- Stats at Pro Football Reference

Richard Thomas Swatland (October 8, 1945 – April 9, 2022) was an American professional football player who was a guard for one season with the Houston Oilers of the American Football League (AFL). He played college football for the Notre Dame Fighting Irish and was selected by the New Orleans Saints in the eighth round of the 1968 NFL/AFL draft. Swatland also spent time with the Bridgeport Jets of the Atlantic Coast Football League (ACFL), the Washington Redskins and New England Patriots of the National Football League (NFL), and the Hamilton Tiger-Cats of the Canadian Football League (CFL).

== Early life and education ==
Swatland was born on October 8, 1945, in Stamford, Connecticut. He attended Stamford Catholic High School, where he was named all-state and All-American as a senior in 1963.

Swatland played college football for the Notre Dame Fighting Irish. As a freshman, he missed the entire football season. In his second year, Swatland became the team's starting right guard, though he could also play at left guard. In 1966, he was a starter on Notre Dame's undefeated national championship team. As a senior in 1967, Swatland was named second-team All-American by the Central Press Association.

== Professional career ==
Swatland was selected in the eighth round (195th overall) of the 1968 NFL/AFL draft by the New Orleans Saints. He signed a contract with the Saints in early June. He was released by the Saints in mid-August, but was recommended to play with their farm team, the Richmond Roadrunners.

Rather than play for the Roadrunners, Swatland signed a practice squad contract with the Houston Oilers along with Jim LeMoine. He was later promoted to the active roster to be the backup to Tom Regner, one of his teammates at Notre Dame. Overall, Swatland appeared in four games in the 1968 season, starting none. He wore number 64 with the Oilers.

Despite being "almost assured of a job" after Sonny Bishop retired, Swatland was released as part of the final roster cuts in 1969. On October 6, it was announced that he had joined the Bridgeport Jets of the Atlantic Coast Football League (ACFL).

In 1970, Swatland was signed by the Washington Redskins, but did not make their final roster.

In 1971, Swatland signed with the New England Patriots, but was placed on the injury waiver list and was released in August.

After being released by the Patriots, Swatland signed with the Hamilton Tiger-Cats of the Canadian Football League (CFL), but quit midseason. "On my way home I stopped at Niagara Falls and threw my spikes over the falls. I had enough," he later said.

== Later life and death ==
Swatland later became a real estate lawyer. He died on April 9, 2022, at the age of 76.
