= 1966 All-America college football team =

Official list of the best college football players of 1966

The 1966 All-America college football team is composed of college football players who were selected as All-Americans by various organizations that chose All-America college football teams in 1966.

The NCAA recognizes six selectors as "official" for the 1966 season. They are (1) the American Football Coaches Association (AFCA), (2) the Associated Press (AP), (3) the Central Press Association (CP), (4) the Football Writers Association of America (FWAA), (5) the Newspaper Enterprise Association (NEA), and (6) the United Press International (UPI). Four of the six teams (AP, UPI, NEA, and FWAA) were selected by polling of sports writers and/or broadcasters. The Central Press team was selected with input from the captains of the major college teams. The AFCA team was based on a poll of coaches. Other notable selectors, though not recognized by the NCAA as official, included Time magazine, The Sporting News (TSN), and the Walter Camp Football Foundation (WCFF).

The undefeated Notre Dame and Michigan State teams finished the season ranked #1 and #2, played to a 10–10 tie in the 1966 Notre Dame vs. Michigan State football game, and dominated the 1966 All-America selections. Notre Dame had six players who received first-team honors: guard Tom Regner (AFCA, AP, CP, NEA, UPI, Time, TSN, WCFF); back Nick Eddy (AFCA, AP, CP, FWAA, NEA, UPI, WCFF); defensive end Alan Page (CP, FWAA, NEA, Time, TSN, WCFF); linebacker Jim Lynch (AFCA, AP, CP, FWAA, NEA, UPI, Time, TSN, WCFF); and defensive tackles Pete Duranko (AFCA, UPI) and Kevin Hardy (Time, TSN). Michigan State had five: defensive end Bubba Smith (AFCA, AP, CP, FWAA, NEA, UPI, Time, TSN, WCFF); offensive end Gene Washington (AFCA, UPI, Time, TSN); running back Clint Jones (AP, CP, NEA, Time, TSN, WCFF); defensive back/linebacker George Webster (AFCA, AP, CP, FWAA, NEA, UPI, Time, TSN, WCFF); and tackle Jerry West (NEA).

== Consensus All-Americans ==
The NCAA recognizes 22 players as "consensus" All-Americans for the 1966 season. The following chart identifies the consensus All-Americans and displays which first-team designations they received.

Name	Position	School	Official selectors	Number	Others	Total
Jack Clancy	End	Michigan	AFCA, AP, CP, FWAA, NEA, UPI	6/6	FN, Time, TSN, WCFF	10/10
Jim Lynch	Linebacker	Notre Dame	AFCA, AP, CP, FWAA, NEA, UPI	6/6	FN, Time, TSN, WCFF	10/10
Loyd Phillips	Defensive tackle	Arkansas	AFCA, AP, CP, FWAA, NEA, UPI	6/6	FN, Time, TSN, WCFF	10/10
Bubba Smith	Defensive end	Michigan State	AFCA, AP, CP, FWAA, NEA, UPI	6/6	FN, Time, TSN, WCFF	10/10
Steve Spurrier	Quarterback	Florida	AFCA, AP, CP, FWAA, NEA, UPI	6/6	FN, Time, TSN, WCFF	10/10
George Webster	Defensive back	Michigan State	AFCA, AP, CP, FWAA, NEA, UPI	6/6	FN, Time, TSN, WCFF	10/10
Mel Farr	Running back	UCLA	AFCA, AP, FWAA, NEA, UPI	5/6	FN, Time, TSN, WCFF	9/10
Tom Regner	Guard	Notre Dame	AFCA, AP, CP, NEA, UPI	5/6	FN, Time, TSN, WCFF	9/10
Nick Eddy	Running back	Notre Dame	AFCA, AP, CP, FWAA, NEA, UPI	6/6	FN, WCFF	8/10
Ron Yary	Tackle	USC	AFCA, CP, FWAA, UPI	4/6	FN, Time, TSN, WCFF	8/10
Cecil Dowdy	Tackle	Alabama	AFCA, AP, CP, FWAA, NEA, UPI	6/6	WCFF	7/10
Wayne Meylan	Middle guard	Nebraska	AFCA, AP, FWAA, NEA, UPI	5/6	FN, WCFF	7/10
Alan Page	Defensive end	Notre Dame	CP, FWAA, NEA	3/6	FN, Time, TSN, WCFF	7/10
Nate Shaw	Defensive back	USC	AFCA, NEA, UPI	3/6	FN, Time, TSN, WCFF	7/10
Tom Beier	Defensive back	Miami (Fla.)	AFCA, AP, NEA, UPI	4/6	FN, WCFF	6/10
Jim Breland	Center	Georgia Tech	AFCA, AP, CP, UPI	4/6	FN, WCFF	6/10
Clint Jones	Running back	Michigan State	AP, CP, NEA	3/6	Time, TSN, WCFF	6/10
Paul Naumoff	Linebacker	Tennessee	AFCA, AP, FWAA, UPI	4/6	FN, WCFF	6/10
Ray Perkins	End	Alabama	AFCA, AP, FWAA, NEA	4/6	FN, WCFF	6/10
LaVerne Allers	Guard	Nebraska	AP, CP, UPI	3/6	FN, WCFF	5/10
John LaGrone	Middle guard	SMU	AFCA, CP, FWAA, NEA	4/6	WCFF	5/10
Tom Greenlee	Defensive tackle	Washington	AFCA, AP, UPI	3/6	WCFF	4/10

== Offensive selections ==
=== Ends ===
- Jack Clancy, Michigan (AFCA, AP-1, CP-1, FWAA, NEA-1 [split end], UPI-1, FN, Time, TSN, WCFF)
- Ray Perkins, Alabama (AFCA [flanker], AP-1, CP-2, FWAA, NEA-1 [safety], UPI-2, FN, WCFF)
- Gene Washington, Michigan State (College Football Hall of Fame) (AFCA, NEA-2 [split end], UPI-1, Time, TSN)
- Jim Beirne, Purdue (CP-1)
- Eppie Barney, Iowa (AP-2 [end])
- Larry Gilbert, Texas Tech (AP-2 [end])
- Jim Seymour, Notre Dame (CP-2, NEA-2 [flanker], UPI-2, FN)

=== Tight ends ===
- Austin Denney, Tennessee (NEA-1)
- Cas Banaszek, Northwestern (NEA-2)

=== Tackles ===
- Cecil Dowdy, Alabama (AFCA [guard], AP-1, CP-1, FWAA, NEA-1, UPI-1, WCFF)
- Ron Yary, USC (College and Pro Football Halls of Fame) (AFCA, AP-2, CP-1, FWAA, NEA-2, UPI-1, FN, Time, TSN, WCFF)
- Wayne Mass, Clemson (AFCA, CP-2, UPI-2)
- Jerry West, Michigan State (NEA-1)
- Jack Calcaterra, Purdue (AP-2, UPI-2)
- Reeve Vannaman, Cornell (CP-2)

=== Guards ===
- Tom Regner, Notre Dame (AFCA, AP-1, CP-1, NEA-1, UPI-1, FN, Time, TSN, WCFF)
- LaVerne Allers, Nebraska (AP-1, CP-1, NEA-2, UPI-1, FN, WCFF)
- Mo Moorman, Texas A&M (FWAA, NEA-2 [tackle], Time, TSN)
- Gary Bugenhagen, Syracuse (AP-1 [tackle], FWAA)
- Bob Hyland, Boston College (CP-2, Time, TSN)
- Edgar Chandler, Georgia (NEA-1, UPI-2)
- Lynn Thornhill, Southern Methodist (AP-2)
- Del Williams, Florida State (AP-2, CP-2, NEA-2, UPI-2)

=== Centers ===
- Jim Breland, Georgia Tech (AFCA, AP-1, CP-1, NEA-1, UPI-1, FN, WCFF)
- Bill Carr, Florida (AP-2, CP-2, Time, TSN)
- Ray Pryor, Ohio State (FWAA, NEA-2)
- Bob Johnson, Tennessee (FN)
- George Goeddeke, Notre Dame (UPI-2)

=== Quarterbacks ===
- Steve Spurrier, Florida (College Football Hall of Fame) (AFCA [tie], AP-1, CP-1, FWAA, NEA-1, UPI-1, FN, Time, TSN, WCFF)
- Bob Griese, Purdue (College and Pro Football Halls of Fame) (AFCA [tie], AP-2, CP-2, NEA-2, UPI-2, FN)
- Gary Beban, UCLA (FN)

=== Running backs ===
- Mel Farr, UCLA (AFCA, AP-1, CP-2, FWAA, NEA-1, UPI-1, FN [halfback], Time, TSN, WCFF)
- Nick Eddy, Notre Dame (AFCA, AP-1, CP-1, FWAA, NEA-1 (FL), UPI-1, FN [halfback], WCFF)
- Clint Jones, Michigan State (AP-1, CP-1, NEA-1, UPI-2, Time, TSN, WCFF)
- Floyd Little, Syracuse (College and Pro Football Halls of Fame) (AFCA, AP-2, CP-2, NEA-2, UPI-1, WCFF)
- Ray McDonald, Idaho (AP-2, NEA-2, UPI-2, Time, TSN)
- Lenny Snow, Georgia Tech (FWAA, UPI-2, FN [halfback])
- Larry Csonka, Syracuse (College and Pro Football Halls of Fame) (CP-1 [fullback], FN [fullback])
- Jim Bohl, New Mexico State (FN [halfback])
- Warren McVea, Houston (FN [halfback])
- Bob Apisa, Michigan State (FN [fullback])
- Larry Conjar, Notre Dame (FN [fullback])
- Garrett Ford, Sr., West Virginia (AP-2)
- Pete Pifer, Oregon State (CP-2 [fullback])

== Defensive selections ==
=== Defensive ends ===
- Bubba Smith, Michigan State (College Football Hall of Fame) (AFCA, AP-1, CP-1, FWAA, NEA-1, UPI-1, FN [end], Time, TSN, WCFF)
- Alan Page, Notre Dame (College and Pro Football Halls of Fame) (AP-2, CP-1, FWAA, NEA-1, UPI-2, FN [end], Time, TSN, WCFF)
- George Foussekis, Virginia Tech (AP-2)
- Sam Harris, Colorado (CP-2, UPI-2)
- Billy Anders, Ohio State (CP-2)
- Dennis Randall, Oklahoma State (NEA-2)
- Ted Hendricks, Miami (College and Pro Football Halls of Fame) (NEA-2)

=== Defensive tackles ===
- Loyd Phillips, Arkansas (College Football Hall of Fame) (AFCA, AP-1, CP-1, FWAA, NEA-1, UPI, FN [tackle], Time, TSN, WCFF)
- Tom Greenlee, Washington (AFCA, AP-1 [defensive end], UPI-1 [defensive end], WCFF)
- Pete Duranko, Notre Dame (AFCA, UPI)
- Dennis Byrd, North Carolina State (College Football Hall of Fame) (AP-2, NEA-1, FWAA)
- George Patton, Georgia (AP-1, CP-1, UPI-2, FN [tackle])
- Kevin Hardy, Notre Dame (AP-2, UPI-2, FN [tackle], Time, TSN)
- Bill Stanfill, Georgia (College Football Hall of Fame) (NEA-2)
- Ed Philpott, Miami (OH) (CP-2, NEA-2)
- Jim Urbanek, Mississippi (CP-2, FN [tackle])

=== Middle guards ===
- Wayne Meylan, Nebraska (College Football Hall of Fame) (AFCA [defensive tackle], AP-1, CP-2 [guard], FWAA, NEA-1, UPI-1, FN [guard], WCFF)
- John LaGrone, SMU (AFCA [middle guard], AP-2, CP-1 [guard], FWAA, NEA-1 [linebacker], UPI-2, WCFF)
- John Richardson, UCLA (CP-1 [guard])
- Granville Liggins, Oklahoma (CP-2 [guard], NEA-2, FN [guard])

=== Linebackers ===
- Jim Lynch, Notre Dame (College Football Hall of Fame) (AFCA, AP-1, CP-1, FWAA, NEA-1, UPI-1, FN, Time, TSN, WCFF)
- Paul Naumoff, Tennessee (AFCA, AP-1, CP-2, FWAA, NEA-2, UPI-1, FN, WCFF)
- Bob Matheson, Duke (AP-1, Time, TSN)
- Townsend Clarke, Army (AP-2, CP-1, NEA-1, UPI-2)
- Charles Thornhill, Michigan State (AP-2, NEA-2, UPI-2)
- Adrian Young, Southern California (AP-2)
- D. D. Lewis, Mississippi State (CP-2)
- Wayne Purdon, Montana State (CP-2)

=== Defensive backs ===
- George Webster, Michigan State (College Football Hall of Fame) (AFCA, AP-1, CP-1 [linebacker], FWAA, NEA-1 [linebacker], UPI-1, FN [linebacker], Time, TSN, WCFF)
- Nate Shaw, USC (AFCA, AP-2, CP-2, NEA-1, UPI-1, FN, Time, TSN, WCFF)
- Tom Beier, Miami (Fla.) (AFCA, AP-1, CP-2, NEA-1, UPI-1, FN, WCFF)
- Frank Loria, Virginia Tech (AP-1, FWAA)
- Martine Bercher, Arkansas (AFCA, UPI-1)
- Rick Volk, Michigan (Time, TSN)
- John Charles, Purdue (Time, TSN)
- Henry King, Utah State (NEA-2, Time, TSN)
- Bobby Johns, Alabama (CP-1, UPI-2, FN)
- Wynn Mabry, Dartmouth (CP-1)
- Larry Wachholtz, Nebraska (AP-2, UPI-2)
- Chuck Latourette, Rice (AP-2)
- Bruce Sullivan, Illinois (NEA-2)
- Bobby Bryant, South Carolina (NEA-2 [safety])
- Tom Schoen, Notre Dame (UPI-2)
- Lynn Hughes, Georgia (UPI-2)

== Special teams ==
=== Kicker ===
- Jan Stenerud, Montana State (Pro Football Hall of Fame) (TSN)

=== Punter ===
- Ron Widby, Tennessee (TSN)

== Key ==
- **Bold** – Consensus All-American
- -1 – First-team selection
- -2 – Second-team selection
- -3 – Third-team selection

=== Official selectors ===
- AFCA = American Football Coaches Association, sponsored by the Eastman Kodak Company
- AP = Associated Press, "based on recommendations of the AP football board of sportswriters and sportscasters"
- CP = Central Press Association, "picked with the aid of the nation's football captains"
- FWAA = Football Writers Association of America
- NEA = Newspaper Enterprise Association, "chosen by consulting scouts, coaches and writers in every part of the country, representing a true cross-section of opinion"
- UPI = United Press International, "selected by the ballots of 267 football writers and broadcasters"

=== Unofficial selectors ===
- FN = The Football News, consisting of the 34 best players out of the 25,000 men playing college football that year, as selected by the paper's correspondents and staff members
- Time = Time magazine
- TSN = The Sporting News, consisting of 24 players (11 offense, 11 defense, a punter, and a placekicker) "picked by 24 directors of player personnel of the American and National Football Leagues for the Sporting News"
- WCFF = Walter Camp Football Foundation

== See also ==
- 1966 All-Atlantic Coast Conference football team
- 1966 All-Big Ten Conference football team
- 1966 All-Pacific-8 Conference football team
- 1966 All-SEC football team
- 1966 All-Southwest Conference football team
