= Erik Hansen =

Erik Hansen may refer to:

- Erik Hansen (American football) (born 1999), St. Louis Battlehawks of the XFL
- Erik Hansen (architect) (1927–2016), Danish architect
- Erik Hansen (canoeist) (1939–2014), Danish flatwater canoer
- Erik Hansen (footballer)
- Erik Hansen (football manager), managed Denmark national team, 1967–69
- Erik Hansen (general) (1889–1967), German general of the Wehrmacht during World War II
- Erik Hansen (linguist) (1931–2017), Danish linguist
- Erik Hansen (sailor) (born 1945), Danish sailor and Olympic champion
- Erik Fosnes Hansen (born 1965), Norwegian writer

== See also ==
- Eric Hansen (disambiguation)
- Erik Hanson (disambiguation)
- Erik Kofoed-Hansen (1897–1965), Danish fencer
- Erik Ninn-Hansen (1922–2014), Danish politician
- Erik Haaest (born Erik Hansen, 1935–2012), Danish journalist and writer
