= Jim Breland =

American football player (born 1944)

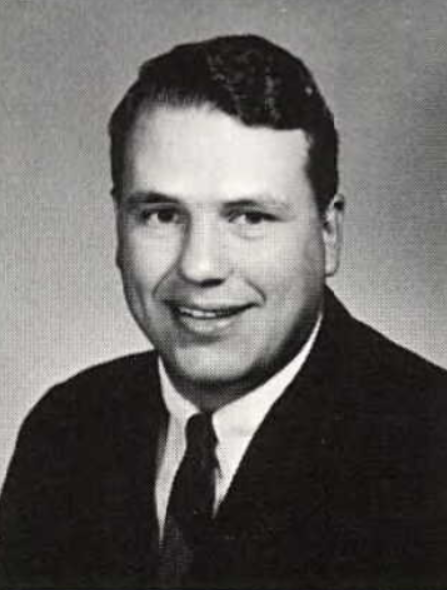
- Breland from 1968 Blueprint

Profile
- Position: Center

Personal information
- Born: 1944 (age 81–82)
- Listed height: 6 ft 2 in (1.88 m)
- Listed weight: 223 lb (101 kg)

Career information
- College: Georgia Tech
- NFL draft: 1966: 17th round, 255th overall pick

Awards and highlights
- Consensus All-American (1966); Georgia Tech Sports Hall of Fame (1978)

James E. Breland, Jr. (born 1944) is an American former football player who was an All-American center for the Georgia Tech Yellow Jackets football team of the Georgia Institute of Technology.

Breland initially attended the United States Naval Academy in Annapolis, Maryland, where he played linebacker for the Navy Midshipmen football team as a sophomore in 1963. As a member of the Midshipmen's football team led by quarterback Roger Staubach, he played in the 1964 Cotton Bowl Classic.

After his sophomore season, Breland transferred to Georgia Tech in Atlanta, Georgia, and sat out the 1964 season as required by NCAA transfer rules. He was a two-year starter at center for coach Bobby Dodd's Georgia Tech Yellow Jackets from 1965 to 1966. As a junior in 1965, he was a key member of the Yellow Jackets team than compiled a 7–3–1 record, and defeated the Texas Tech Red Raiders 31–21 in the December 1965 Gator Bowl. He was a team captain during the team's 1966 season when the Yellow Jackets finished 9–2 and received an invitation to the January 1967 Orange Bowl. He was recognized as a consensus first-team All-American following his senior season, when he was a first-team selection by the American Football Coaches Association, the Associated Press, Central Press Association, Newspaper Enterprise Association, United Press International, and the Walter Camp Football Foundation.

Breland was honored as an Academic All-American in 1966, graduated from Georgia Tech with a bachelor's degree in civil engineering in 1967, and was inducted into the Georgia Tech Sports Hall of Fame in 1978. At the end of his final season as Georgia Tech's long-time football coach in 1966, Bobby Dodd called Breland "the best offensive center I've ever had at Tech."

== See also ==
- Georgia Tech Yellow Jackets
- List of Georgia Institute of Technology alumni
