= Cecil Dowdy =

American gridiron football player (1945–2002)

No. 70
- Position: Offensive tackle

Personal information
- Born: May 9, 1945; Barton, Alabama, U.S.
- Died: November 24, 2002 (aged 57); Helena, Arkansas, U.S.

Career information
- College: Alabama

Career history
- 1964–1966: Alabama
- 1967: Cleveland Browns
- 1968: Los Angeles Rams
- 1969: Saskatchewan Roughriders

Awards and highlights
- 2× National champion (1964, 1965); Unanimous All-American (1966); Jacobs Blocking Trophy (1966); First-team All-SEC (1966)

Cecil Dowdy (May 9, 1945 – November 24, 2002) was an American professional football player who was an offensive tackle in the National Football League (NFL). He played college football for the Alabama Crimson Tide from 1964 through 1966. He was a member of both the 1964 and 1965 national championship teams. Dowdy was also named a unanimous All-American in 1966.

== Playing career ==
=== College ===
After a successful high school playing career at Cherokee Vocational High School that culminated with his selection to the 16th annual AHSAA All-Star Game in 1963, Dowdy enrolled at the University of Alabama with an athletic scholarship to play on the football team. After he played on the freshman football squad for the 1963 season, Dowdy stated as an offensive tackle for the three years that followed. Over those three seasons, Alabama amassed an overall record of 30 wins, two losses and one tie (30–2–1) and won three Southeastern Conference (SEC) championships and two national championships.

In recognition for his play on the field, Dowdy was recognized as a unanimous selection to the 1966 College Football All-America Team as an offensive tackle. He was also awarded the Jacobs Blocking Trophy in 1966 as the best blocker in the SEC as selected by the coaches.

=== Professional ===
Dowdy was selected in the ninth round (230th overall) of the 1967 NFL/AFL draft by the Cleveland Browns. After spending a season with the Browns with limited playing time, Dowdy was traded to the Los Angeles Rams ahead of the 1968 season, where he was a member of their practice squad. In April 1969, Dowdy signed with the Saskatchewan Roughriders of the Canadian Football League. He was later waived by the team in July 1969.

== Death ==
Dowdy died on November 24, 2002, at Helena, Arkansas at the age of 57. His death was ruled accidental after his shotgun discharged and hit him in his lower jaw when he was retrieving a duck he hit during a hunting trip at Lambrook, Arkansas. He was pronounced dead at 11:45 a.m at Helena Regional Medical Center.
