= Paul Seiler =

American football player (1945–2001)

No. 71, 79, 65
- Positions: Center, Tackle

Personal information
- Born: November 1, 1945; Algona, Iowa, U.S.
- Died: September 25, 2001 (aged 55)
- Listed height: 6 ft 4 in (1.93 m)
- Listed weight: 258 lb (117 kg)

Career information
- High school: Bishop Garrigan (Algona)
- College: Notre Dame
- NFL draft: 1967: 1st round, 12th overall pick

Career history
- New York Jets (1967, 1969); Oakland Raiders (1971–1973)

Awards and highlights
- National champion (1966)

Career NFL/AFL statistics
- Games played: 39
- Games started: 1
- Fumble recoveries: 1
- Stats at Pro Football Reference

Paul Herman Seiler (November 1, 1945 – September 25, 2001) was an American professional football offensive lineman who played in the American (AFL) and National Football League (NFL) for the New York Jets and Oakland Raiders.

Born in Algona, Iowa, Seiler played college football at the University of Notre Dame and was a member of the school's 1966 team that won the national championship. After playing for a combined 59 minutes in 1964 and 1965 as a backup, he was Notre Dame's starting right tackle in 1966, his senior year. In the 1967 NFL/AFL draft, the Jets selected him in the first round with the 12th overall pick. Seiler played in two games for the Jets in the 1967 AFL season, but a leg injury led the Jets to put him on a "waived injured list". In 1968, he joined the United States Army and did not play that season. Seiler returned to the Jets in 1969, playing in 11 games. After undergoing offseason leg surgery, the Jets released Seiler before the start of the 1970 season. From 1971 to 1973, Seiler played for the Raiders. He played in 26 games, starting once in 1973, his last NFL season.

Seiler was married and had one stepson. After his football career, he lived in the West Coast region and eventually became a church minister in California. On September 25, 2001, Seiler died of colon cancer at the age of 55.
