= Arkansas Razorbacks football, 1950–1959 =

Contents:	1950 – 1951 – 1952 – 1953 – 1954 – 1955 – 1956 – 1957 – 1958 – 1959

== 1950–1959 Statistical Leaders ==
=== Passing ===
Year	Player	Com	Att	%	Yards
1950	Jim Rinehart	59	139	42	756
1951	Lamar McHan	53	135	39	724
1952	Lamar McHan	55	136	40	743
1953	Lamar McHan	78	150	52	1,107
1954	George Walker	45	85	53	603
1955	George Walker	22	47	47	347
1956	Don Christian	18	53	34	260
1957	George Walker	35	63	56	587
1958	James Monroe	41	96	43	512
1959	James Monroe	19	30	63	202

=== Rushing ===
Year	Player	Att	Yards	Avg
1950	Buddy Rodgers	118	476	4.0
1951	Lamar McHan	127	433	3.4
1952	Buddy Sutton	100	448	4.5
1953	Lamar McHan	143	409	2.9
1954	Henry Moore	153	670	4.4
1955	Henry Moore	134	701	5.2
1956	Gerald Nesbitt	129	663	5.1
1957	Gerald Nesbitt	145	624	4.3
1958	Jim Mooty	71	395	5.6
1959	Jim Mooty	93	519	5.6

=== Receiving ===
Year	Player	Rec	Yards	YPC
1950	Bill Jurney	22	465	15.2
1951	Pat Summerall	24	358	14.9
1952	Lewis Carpenter	19	335	17.6
1953	Floyd Sagely	30	542	18.1
1954	Preston Carpenter	21	234	11.1
1955	Preston Carpenter	11	155	14.1
1956	Ron Underwood	7	154	22.0
1957	Billy Kyser	10	179	17.9
1958	Charles Barnes	15	175	11.7
1959	Steve Butler	9	107	11.9

Source: ESPN College Football Encyclopedia

== See also ==
- University of Arkansas
- Arkansas Razorbacks
- Arkansas Razorbacks football, 1940–1949
- Arkansas Razorbacks football, 1960–1969
- Cotton Bowl Classic
- Gator Bowl
- Southwest Conference
