= Jim Seymour (American football) =

American football player (1946–2011)

No. 84, 85
- Position: Wide receiver

Personal information
- Born: November 24, 1946; Detroit, Michigan, U.S.
- Died: March 29, 2011 (aged 64); Deerfield, Illinois, U.S.
- Listed height: 6 ft 4 in (1.93 m)
- Listed weight: 210 lb (95 kg)

Career information
- High school: Shrine (Royal Oak, Michigan)
- College: Notre Dame
- NFL draft: 1969: 1st round, 10th overall pick

Career history
- Los Angeles Rams (1969); Chicago Bears (1970–1972); Chicago Fire (1974)

Awards and highlights
- National champion (1966); 2× First-team All-American (1967, 1968); Second-team All-American (1966); Notre Dame record: most receiving yards in a single game (276)

Career NFL statistics
- Receptions: 21
- Receiving yards: 385
- Touchdowns: 5
- Stats at Pro Football Reference

James Patrick Seymour (November 24, 1946 – March 29, 2011) was an American professional football wide receiver who played three seasons for the Chicago Bears in the National Football League (NFL). He was originally selected by the Los Angeles Rams in the first round of the 1969 NFL/AFL draft, tenth pick overall. In 1974, he played for the Chicago Fire of the World Football League (WFL).

Seymour played high school football at Shrine of the Little Flower High School, Royal Oak, Michigan, and college football at Notre Dame, where he was a two-time First-team All-American (1967, 1968) while also being a Second-team All-America selection in 1966. He is widely considered to be one of the Top 50 players in Notre Dame history, and is one of only five three-time football All-Americans at the school (Leon Hart, Ken MacAfee, Chris Zorich, Luther Bradley). Seymour was featured on the cover of Time Magazine in the October 28th, 1966 issue, along with Terry Hanratty. He was the older brother of former professional football player Paul Seymour.

He was traded along with Ron Smith from the Rams to the Bears for Dick Evey on September 1, 1970.

Seymour died on March 29, 2011, from cancer. He was buried in the Cedar Grove Cemetery in Notre Dame, Indiana.
