= Erik Hanson =

Erik Hanson may refer to:

- Erik Hanson (baseball)
- Erik Hanson, member of Kill Sadie

== See also ==
- Eric Hansen (disambiguation)
- Erik Hansen (disambiguation)
