= Nick Eddy =

American football player (1944–2025)

No. 40
- Position: Running back

Personal information
- Born: August 23, 1944; Dunsmuir, California, U.S.
- Died: December 31, 2025 (aged 81)
- Listed height: 6 ft 1 in (1.85 m)
- Listed weight: 210 lb (95 kg)

Career information
- High school: Tracy (Tracy, California)
- College: Notre Dame (1963–1966)
- NFL draft: 1966: 2nd round, 24th overall pick
- AFL draft: 1966: Red Shirt 1st round, 3rd overall pick

Career history
- Detroit Lions (1966–1972)

Awards and highlights
- 2× National champion (1964, 1966); Unanimous All-American (1966)

Career NFL statistics
- Rushing yards: 523
- Rushing average: 3.4
- Receptions: 24
- Receiving yards: 237
- Total touchdowns: 5
- Stats at Pro Football Reference

Nicholas Matthew Eddy (August 23, 1944 – December 31, 2025) was an American professional football player who was a running back for the Detroit Lions of the National Football League (NFL). He played college football for the Notre Dame Fighting Irish, earning consensus All-American honors in 1966.

== Biography ==
Eddy was raised in Tracy, California. A broad-shouldered 6 feet, 195 lbs, he attended the University of Notre Dame on a football scholarship. Eddy was a standout running back and kick returner. Eddy was an All-American halfback, leading Notre Dame to the 1966 national championship. He finished third to Steve Spurrier and Bob Griese in the 1966 Heisman Trophy balloting. The Detroit Lions drafted Eddy in the 1966 NFL draft. Eddy played for the Lions from 1967 to 1972, although he was never a star. He was hampered by knee injuries.

He appeared as himself in the George Plimpton movie, Paper Lion. Eddy and his spouse and family lived in Modesto, California.

Eddy obtained a Mild Moderate Specialist teaching credential from Chapman University in Modesto in 2005. He taught special education for Modesto City Schools. Eric C. Hansen devotes a chapter to Eddy in his book, Notre Dame: Where Have You Gone (2005).

Eddy died from a cardiac arrest on December 31, 2025, at the age of 81.
