= 1966 Notre Dame Fighting Irish football team =

American college football season

1966 Notre Dame Fighting Irish football

Consensus national champion NFF co-national champion
- Conference: Independent

Ranking
- Coaches: No. 1
- AP: No. 1
- Record: 9–0–1
- Head coach: Ara Parseghian (3rd season)
- Offensive scheme: T formation
- Base defense: 4–4
- Captain: Jim Lynch
- Home stadium: Notre Dame Stadium

1966 NCAA University Division independents football records
	Conf.					Overall
Team	W		L		T	W		L		T
No. 1 Notre Dame		–		–		9	–	0	–	1
Colgate		–		–		8	–	1	–	1
No. 8 Georgia Tech		–		–		9	–	2	–	0
Army		–		–		8	–	2	–	0
Dayton		–		–		8	–	2	–	0
Houston		–		–		8	–	2	–	0
Memphis State		–		–		7	–	2	–	0
No. 9 Miami (FL)		–		–		8	–	2	–	1
Virginia Tech		–		–		8	–	2	–	1
Syracuse		–		–		8	–	3	–	0
Colorado State		–		–		7	–	3	–	0
New Mexico State		–		–		7	–	3	–	0
West Texas State		–		–		7	–	3	–	0
Villanova		–		–		6	–	3	–	0
Holy Cross		–		–		6	–	3	–	1
Southern Miss		–		–		6	–	4	–	0
Texas Western		–		–		6	–	4	–	0
Tulane		–		–		5	–	4	–	1
Florida State		–		–		6	–	5	–	0
Buffalo		–		–		5	–	5	–	0
Penn State		–		–		5	–	5	–	0
Air Force		–		–		4	–	6	–	0
Boston College		–		–		4	–	6	–	0
Navy		–		–		4	–	6	–	0
Utah State		–		–		4	–	6	–	0
Xavier		–		–		4	–	6	–	0
Pacific (CA)		–		–		4	–	7	–	0
San Jose State		–		–		3	–	7	–	0
Pittsburgh		–		–		1	–	9	–	0
Rankings from AP Poll

The 1966 Notre Dame Fighting Irish football team was an American football team that represented the University of Notre Dame as an independent during the 1966 NCAA University Division football season. In their second season under head coach Ara Parseghian, the Irish compiled a 9–0–1 record, shut out six of ten opponents, outscored all opponents by a total of 362 to 38, and were ranked No. 1 in the final AP and UPI Polls. In four games against ranked opponents, they defeated No. 7 Purdue (26–14), No. 10 Oklahoma (38–0), and No. 10 USC (51–0), and tied with No. 2 Michigan State (10–10). The 1966 Notre Dame vs. Michigan State football game is considered one of the great "games of the century".

Notre Dame linebacker Jim Lynch won the Maxwell Award as the best all-around player in college football. Lynch, guard Tom Regner, halfback Nick Eddy, and defensive end Alan Page were consensus first-team selections on the 1966 All-America college football team. Defensive tackles Pete Duranko and Kevin Hardy also received first-team All-America honors from multiple seectors. The team's statistical leaders included quarterback Terry Hanratty (1,247 passing yards), Eddy (553 rushing yards, 60 points scored), end Jim Seymour (862 receiving yards), and Lynch (106 tackles).

The team played its home games at Notre Dame Stadium in Notre Dame, Indiana.

== Schedule ==
Date	Opponent	Rank	Site	Result	Attendance	Source
September 24	No. 7 Purdue	No. 8	Notre Dame Stadium; Notre Dame, IN (rivalry)	W 26–14	59,075	
October 1	at Northwestern	No. 4	Dyche Stadium; Evanston, IL (rivalry)	W 35–7	55,356	
October 8	Army	No. 3	Notre Dame Stadium; Notre Dame, IN (rivalry)	W 35–0	59,075	
October 15	North Carolina	No. 2	Notre Dame Stadium; Notre Dame, IN (rivalry)	W 32–0	59,075	
October 22	at No. 10 Oklahoma	No. 1	Oklahoma Memorial Stadium; Norman, OK	W 38–0	63,439	
October 29	vs. Navy	No. 1	John F. Kennedy Stadium; Philadelphia, PA (rivalry)	W 31–7	70,101	
November 5	Pittsburgh	No. 1	Notre Dame Stadium; Notre Dame, IN (rivalry)	W 40–0	59,075	
November 12	Duke	No. 1	Notre Dame Stadium; Notre Dame, IN	W 64–0	59,075	
November 19	at No. 2 Michigan State	No. 1	Spartan Stadium; East Lansing, MI (rivalry)	T 10–10	80,011	
November 26	at No. 10 USC	No. 1	Los Angeles Memorial Coliseum; Los Angeles, CA (rivalry)	W 51–0	88,520	
Rankings from AP Poll released prior to the game; Source:

== Roster ==
1966 Notre Dame Fighting Irish football team roster
Players
Coaches
Offense

Pos.	#	Name	Class
QB	2	Bob Belden	So
RB	28	Rocky Bleier	Jr
RB	32	Larry Conjar
RB	21	Frank Criniti
RB	38	Ron Dushney
RB	47	Nick Eddy
G	68	Roger Fox
RB	20	Bob Gladieux	So
TE	80	Don Gmitter
C	54	George Goeddeke
G	57	Tim Gorman
RB	22	Dave Haley
WR	86	Curt Heneghan
QB	5	Terry Hanratty	So
C	58	Gerald Kelly
OT	73	Rudy Konieczny
G	75	Bob Kuechenberg	So
TE	78	Mike Kuzmicz
G	69	Joe Marsico
RB	31	Paul May
OT	79	Tom McKinley
C	55	Tim Monty
QB	3	Coley O’Brien
G	62	Steve Quinn
WR	89	Kevin Rassas
G	76	Tom Regner
OT	70	Fred Schnurr
OT	71	Paul Seiler
WR	85	Jim Seymour
WR	49	Brian Stenger
G	59	Dick Swatland
TE	96	Jim Winegardner

Defense

Pos.	#	Name	Class
DT	77	Harry Alexander
S	33	Mike Burgener
DT	64	Pete Duranko
DT	75	Kevin Hardy
CB	34	Dan Harshman
LB	51	John Horney
LB	65	Ron Jeziorski
DE	93	Chick Lauck
LB	41	John Lavin
CB	40	Tom O’Leary
LB	61	Jim Lynch	Sr
LB	56	Dave Martin
LB	60	Mike McGill
DT	72	Eric Norri
DE	81	Alan Page	Sr
LB	50	John Pergine	Jr
CB	19	Tom Quinn
DB	30	Jim Kelly
DE	87	Tom Rhoads
DE	88	Allen Sack
S	7	Tom Schoen	Jr
DE	94	Bill Skoglund
CB	25	Jim Smithberger
LB	89	Al VanHuffel
LB	54	Ed Vuillemin

Special teams

Pos.	#	Name	Class
P	90	Joe Azzaro
K	11	Jim Ryan

Head coach

- Ara Parseghian

Coordinators/assistant coaches

Legend

- (C) Team captain
- (S) Suspended
- (I) Ineligible
- Injured
- Redshirt

== Game summaries ==
=== Purdue ===
Purdue at Notre Dame

Team	1	2	3	4	Total
No. 8 Boilermakers	7	0	0	7	14
• No. 6 Fighting Irish	7	7	0	12	26

- Date: September 24
- Location: Notre Dame Stadium, Notre Dame, IN
- Game start: 1:15 pm CDT
- Game attendance: 59,075
- Game weather: Fair, 67 degrees
- TV announcers (ABC (national)): Chris Schenkel and Bud Wilkinson

Scoring summary
1	PUR	Leroy Keyes 94-yard fumble return (kick good)	PUR 7-0
1	ND	Nick Eddy 96-yard kickoff return (kick good)	Tied 7-7
2	ND	Jim Seymour 84-yard pass from Terry Hanratty (kick good)	ND 14-7
4	ND	Jim Seymour 39-yard pass from Terry Hanratty	ND 20-7
4	PUR	Perry Williams 1-yard run (kick good)	ND 20-14
4	ND	Jim Seymour 7-yard pass from Terry Hanratty	ND 26-14

=== Northwestern ===
Notre Dame at Northwestern

Team	1	2	3	4	Total
• No. 4 Fighting Irish	7	6	8	14	35
Wildcats	0	0	0	7	7

- Date: October 1
- Location: Dyche Stadium, Evanston, IL
- Game start: 1:30 pm CDT
- Game attendance: 55,356
- Game weather: Partly sunny, 60 degrees

Scoring summary
1	ND	Nick Eddy 56-yard run (kick good)	ND 7-0
2	ND	Larry Conjar 1-yard run (kick failed)	ND 13-0
3	ND	Rocky Bleier 12-yard run (2-pt. good)	ND 21-0
4	ND	Frank Criniti 2-yard run (kick good)	ND 28-0
4	ND	Tom Schoen 37-yard interception return (kick good)	ND 35-0
4	NU	Roger Murphy 22-yard pass from Bill Melzer (kick good)	ND 35-7

=== Army ===
Army at Notre Dame

Team	1	2	3	4	Total
Cadets	0	0	0	0	0
• No. 3 Fighting Irish	21	14	0	0	35

- Date: October 8
- Location: Notre Dame Stadium, Notre Dame, IN
- Game start: 1:30 pm CDT
- Game attendance: 59,075
- Game weather: Fair, 76 degrees

Scoring summary
1	ND	Rocky Bleier 2-yard run (kick good)	ND 7-0
1	ND	Jim Seymour 33-yard pass from Terry Hanratty (kick good)	ND 14-0
1	ND	Terry Hanratty 7-yard run (kick good)	ND 21-0
2	ND	Nick Eddy 3-yard run (kick good)	ND 28-0
2	ND	Nick Eddy 3-yard run (kick good)	ND 35-0

=== North Carolina ===
North Carolina at Notre Dame

Team	1	2	3	4	Total
Tar Heels	0	0	0	0	0
• No. 2 Fighting Irish	7	13	6	6	32

- Date: October 15
- Location: Notre Dame Stadium, Notre Dame, IN
- Game start: 1:30 pm CDT
- Game attendance: 59,075
- Game weather: Cloudy, 50 degrees, wind 22-40 MPH

Scoring summary
1	ND	Larry Conjar 1-yard run (kick good)	ND 7-0
2	ND	Larry Conjar 1-yard run (kick failed)	ND 13-0
2	ND	Jim Seymour 56-yard pass from Terry Hanratty (kick good)	ND 20-0
3	ND	Nick Eddy 52-yard run (2-pt. failed)	ND 26-0
4	ND	Bob Gladieux 5-yard run (2-pt. failed)	ND 32-0

=== Oklahoma ===
Notre Dame at Oklahoma

Team	1	2	3	4	Total
• No. 1 Fighting Irish	0	17	21	0	38
No. 10 Sooners	0	0	0	0	0

- Date: October 22
- Location: Oklahoma Memorial Stadium, Norman, OK
- Game start: 2:30 pm CDT
- Game attendance: 63,439
- Game weather: Fair, 66 degrees

Scoring summary
2		ND	Nick Eddy 3-yard run (Joe Azzaro kick)	ND 7-0
2		ND	Terry Hanratty 2-yard run (Joe Azzaro kick)	ND 14-0
2		ND	Joe Azzaro 32-yard field goal	ND 17-0
3		ND	Nick Eddy 1-yard run (Joe Azzaro kick)	ND 24-0
3	3:30	ND	Rocky Bleier 9-yard run (Joe Azzaro kick)	ND 31-0
3		ND	Coley O'Brien 5-yard run (Joe Azzaro kick)	ND 38-0

=== Navy ===
Team	1	2	3	4	Total
• No. 1 Fighting Irish	3	7	14	7	31
Midshipmen	0	0	0	7	7

- Date: October 29
- Location: JFK Stadium, Philadelphia, PA
- Game start: 1:30 pm EDT
- Game attendance: 70,101
- Game weather: Fair, 70 degrees

Scoring summary
1	ND	Azzaro 42-yard field goal	ND 3-0
2	ND	Conjar 7-yard run (Azzaro kick)	ND 10-0
3	ND	Hanratty 1-yard run (Azzaro kick)	ND 17-0
3	ND	Gladieux 1-yard run (Azzaro kick)	ND 24-0
4	NAVY	Bergner recovered blocked punt in end zone (Church kick)	ND 24-7
4	ND	Hanratty 6-yard run (Azzaro kick)	ND 31-7

=== Pittsburgh ===
Pittsburgh at Notre Dame

Team	1	2	3	4	Total
Panthers	0	0	0	0	0
• No. 1 Fighting Irish	0	7	14	19	40

- Date: October 8
- Location: Notre Dame Stadium, Notre Dame, IN
- Game start: 1:30 pm CST
- Game attendance: 59,075
- Game weather: Cloudy, 40 degrees

Scoring summary
2	ND	Terry Hanratty 3-yard run (kick good)	ND 7-0
3	ND	Nick Eddy 85-yard kickoff return (kick failed)	ND 13-0
3	ND	Tom Schoen 63-yard punt return (2-pt. good)	ND 21-0
4	ND	Larry Conjar 1-yard run (2-pt. failed)	ND 27-0
4	ND	Bob Gladieux 19-yard pass from Terry Hanratty (2-pt. failed)	ND 33-0
4	ND	Bob Gladieux 5-yard run (kick good)	ND 40-0

=== Duke ===
Duke at Notre Dame

Team	1	2	3	4	Total
Blue Devils	0	0	0	0	0
• No. 1 Fighting Irish	22	21	14	7	64

- Date: October 15
- Location: Notre Dame Stadium, Notre Dame, IN
- Game start: 1:30 pm CST
- Game attendance: 59,075
- Game weather: Cloudy, 42 degrees

Scoring summary
1	ND	Nick Eddy 77-yard run (2-pt. good)	ND 8-0
1	ND	Tom O'Leary 30-yard return on lateral from John Horney after 25-yard interception return (kick good)	ND 15-0
1	ND	Rocky Bleier 4-yard run (kick good)	ND 22-0
2	ND	Rocky Bleier 45-yard pass from Terry Hanratty (kick good)	ND 29-0
2	ND	Larry Conjar 2-yard run (kick good)	ND 36-0
2	ND	Jim Seymour 10-yard pass from Terry Hanratty (kick good)	ND 43-0
3	ND	Dave Haley 9-yard run (kick good)	ND 50-0
3	ND	Coley O'Brien 3-yard run (kick good)	ND 57-0
4	ND	Frank Criniti 10-yard run (kick good)	ND 64-0

=== Michigan State ===
Notre Dame at Michigan State

Team	1	2	3	4	Total
No.1 Fighting Irish	0	7	0	3	10
No. 2 Spartans	0	10	0	0	10

- Date: November 19
- Location: Spartan Stadium, East Lansing, Michigan
- Game start: 1:30 pm EST
- Game attendance: 80,010
- Game weather: Cloudy, 32 degrees
- Referee: Howard Wirtz
- TV announcers (ABC (regional)): Chris Schenkel and Bud Wilkinson

Scoring summary
2	MSU	Cavender 4-yard run (Kenney kick)	MSU 7-0
2	MSU	Kenney 47-yard field goal	MSU 10-0
2	ND	Gladieux 34-yard pass from O'Brien (Azzaro kick)	MSU 10-7
4	ND	Azzaro 28-yard field goal	Tied 10-10

=== USC ===
Notre Dame at USC

Team	1	2	3	4	Total
• No. 1 Fighting Irish	14	17	13	7	51
No. 10 Trojans	0	0	0	0	0

- Date: November 26
- Location: Los Angeles Memorial Coliseum, Los Angeles
- Game start: 1:30 pm PST
- Game attendance: 88,520
- Game weather: Sunny, 70 degrees

Scoring summary
1	ND	Larry Conjar 2-yard run (Joe Azzaro kick)	ND 7-0
1	ND	Tom Schoen 40-yard interception return (Joe Azzaro kick)	ND 14-0
2	ND	Joe Azzaro 38-yard field goal	ND 17-0
2	ND	Jim Seymour 13-yard pass from Coley O'Brien (Joe Azzaro kick)	ND 24-0
2	ND	Jim Seymour 39-yard pass from Coley O'Brien (Joe Azzaro kick)	ND 31-0
3	ND	Dan Harshman 23-yard pass from Coley O'Brien (Joe Azzaro kick)	ND 38-0
3	ND	Nick Eddy 9-yard run (kick failed)	ND 44-0
4	ND	Dave Martin 33-yard interception return (Joe Azzaro kick)	ND 51-0

== Post-season ==
=== Award winners ===
- Jim Lynch - Maxwell Award

Heisman Voting:

Nick Eddy, 3rd,
Terry Hanratty, 6th

All-Americans
Name	AP	UPI	NEA	FC	SN	L	T	CP	FN
† Nick Eddy, HB	1	1	1	1	2	1		1	1
† Jim Lynch, LB	1	1	1	1	1	1	1	1	1
‡ Tom Regner, G	1	1	1	1	1	1		1	1
Alan Page, DE	2	2	1		1	1	1	1	1
Pete Duranko, DT	3	1		1	2				
Kevin Hardy, DT	2	2	3		1		1		1
Jim Seymour, E	3	2	2		3				1
Paul Seiler, T		3			2				
George Goeddeke, C	3	2	3		3				
Tom Schoen, DB	3	2							
Larry Conjar, FB	3	3			3				1
Terry Hanratty, QB	3		3						
† denotes unanimous selection ‡ denotes consensus selection

College Football Hall of Fame Inductees
Name	Position	Year Inducted
Jim Lynch	Linebacker	1992
Alan Page	Defensive End	1993
Ara Parseghian	Coach	1980

Notre Dame leads all universities in players inducted.

=== 1967 NFL draft ===
Player	Position	Round	Pick	Franchise
Paul Seiler	Guard	1(12)	12	New York Jets
† Alan Page	Defensive End	1(15)	15	Minnesota Vikings
Thomas Regner	Guard	1(23)	23	Houston Oilers
Larry Conjar	Running Back	2(20)	46	Cleveland Browns
Jim Lynch	Linebacker	2(21)	47	Kansas City Chiefs
George Goeddeke	Center	3(6)	59	Denver Broncos
Tom Rhoads	Defensive End	3(17)	70	Buffalo Bills
Allen Sack	Linebacker	16(15)	408	Los Angeles Rams
† Pro Football Hall of Famer
