= Tom Schoen =

American football player (1946–2023)

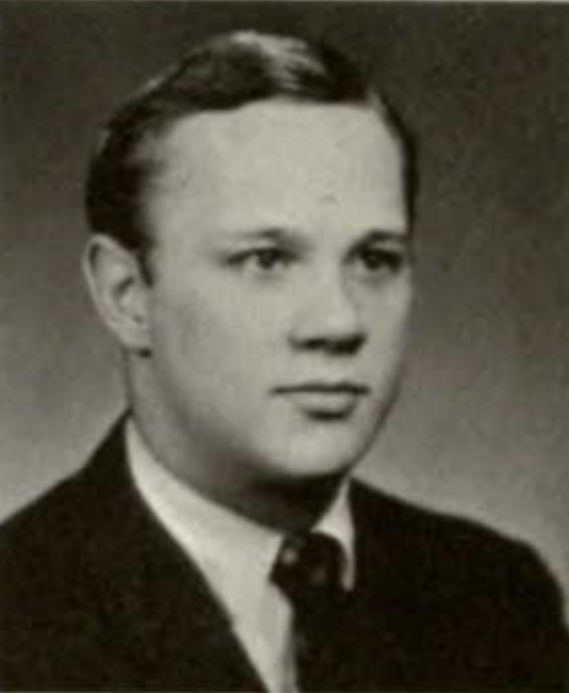
- Schoen from 1968 Dome

No. 33
- Position: Defensive back

Personal information
- Born: 1945 or 1946; Cleveland, Ohio, U.S.
- Died: January 31, 2023 (aged 77)
- Listed height: 5 ft 11 in (1.80 m)
- Listed weight: 185 lb (84 kg)

Career information
- High school: St. Joseph (Cleveland)
- College: Notre Dame
- NFL draft: 1968: 8th round, 212th overall pick

Career history
- Cleveland Browns (1970)

Awards and highlights
- National champion (1966); Consensus All-American (1967); Second-team All-American (1966)
- Stats at Pro Football Reference

Thomas Ralph Schoen (born 1945 or 1946 – January 31, 2023) was an American football defensive back who played one season with the Cleveland Browns of the National Football League (NFL). He was selected by the Browns in the eighth round of the 1968 NFL/AFL draft. He played college football at the University of Notre Dame, where he was a consensus All-American in 1967.

== Early life ==
Schoen played quarterback at St. Joseph High School in Cleveland, Ohio and led the team to a 9–0–1 record his senior year, earning All-Ohio honors.

== College career ==
Schoen joined Notre Dame as a quarterback before being converted to safety his junior and senior seasons. He was a consensus All-American in 1967.

== Professional career ==
Schoen was selected by the Cleveland Browns in the eighth round with the 212th overall pick in the 1968 NFL/AFL draft. He did not play until 1970 because of military service.

While in the military as quarterback, Schoen led the 7th Infantry Division football team to an undefeated 8th Army championship. He was stationed at Fort Campbell, Kentucky in 1969 as a private first class. He also served in South Korea in 1969.

== Coaching career ==
Schoen returned to St. Joseph High School to become assistant football coach in 1988. He was named head coach in 1995 and became the school's athletic director in 1998.

== Personal life ==
Schoen died on January 31, 2023.
