= Arkansas Razorbacks football, 1970–1979 =

American college football seasons

Contents:	1970 – 1971 – 1972 – 1973 – 1974 – 1975 – 1976 – 1977 – 1978 – 1979 – Stats

== 1970–1979 statistical leaders ==
=== Passing ===
Year	Player	Com	Att	%	Yards
1970	Bill Montgomery	110	195	56	1662
1971	Joe Ferguson	160	271	59	2203
1972	Joe Ferguson	119	254	47	1484
1973	Mike Kirkland	75	151	50	990
1974	Scott Bull	14	32	44	238
1975	Scott Bull	33	71	46	570
1976	Ron Calcagni	17	57	30	366
1977	Ron Calcagni	73	137	53	1147
1978	Ron Calcagni	62	103	60	807
1979	Kevin Scanlon	92	139	66	1212

=== Rushing ===
Year	Player	Att	Yards	Avg
1970	Bill Burnett	110	445	4.0
1971	Dickey Morton	127	831	6.5
1972	Dickey Morton	242	1188	4.9
1973	Dickey Morton	226	1298	5.7
1974	Ike Forte	187	974	5.2
1975	Ike Forte	174	983	5.6
1976	Ben Cowins	183	1162	6.3
1977	Ben Cowins	220	1192	5.4
1978	Ben Cowins	188	1006	5.4
1979	Roland Sales	138	625	4.5

=== Receiving ===
Year	Player	Rec	Yards	YPC
1970	Chuck Dicus	38	577	15.2
1971	Mike Reppond	56	986	17.6
1972	Mike Reppond	36	475	13.2
1973	Jack Ettinger	28	411	14.7
1974	Freddie Douglas	15	332	22.1
1975	Freddie Douglas	13	232	17.8
1976	Charles Clay	7	174	24.9
1977	Donnie Bobo	22	454	20.6
1978	Robert Farrell	13	229	17.6
1979	Gary Stiggers	23	221	9.6

== See also ==
- University of Arkansas
- Arkansas Razorbacks
- Arkansas Razorbacks football, 1960–1969
- Arkansas Razorbacks football, 1980–89
- Southwest Conference
- Liberty Bowl
- Cotton Bowl Classic
- Orange Bowl
- Fiesta Bowl
- Sugar Bowl

== Notes ==
Arkansas Razorbacks Sports Network Online 1970–1979 Football Schedule/Results
