= MacArthur Bowl =

American college football trophy

- Location: College Football Hall of Fame, Atlanta, Georgia
- Country: United States
- Presented by: Football Writers Association of America and National Football Foundation

History
- First award: 1959
- Most recent: Indiana
- Website: National Football Foundation

The MacArthur Bowl is a trophy awarded annually by the National Football Foundation (NFF) (owners and operators of the College Football Hall of Fame) to the NCAA Division I Football Bowl Subdivision (FBS) team(s) that are recognized by the NFF as the national champions for that season.

Much like the Stanley Cup of the National Hockey League (NHL), the trophy is kept by the winning institution for one year, then passed on to the next year's winner. The trophy, manufactured by Tiffany & Co., is made of 400 ounces (11,000 g) of silver and is fashioned in the shape of a football stadium measuring 25 by 18 inches (64 cm × 46 cm) on its base, and 10 inches (25 cm) in height.

== History ==
The trophy was the gift of an anonymous donor in honor of General Douglas MacArthur, a founder of National Football Foundation. The trophy features his famous quote: "There is no substitute for victory." MacArthur was known to have a keen interest in college football, Army Cadet football in particular. MacArthur had served as student manager of the Army team during his cadet days. During World War II, he sent a telegram congratulating Army on an undefeated 1944 College football season and defeat of Navy in the Army–Navy Game. The telegram read, "The greatest of all Army teams. We have stopped the war to celebrate your magnificent success."

The trophy was first presented in 1959, and has been presented annually since then. Since its inception, there have been occasions where the MacArthur trophy winner differed from the AP Poll winner, Coaches' Poll winner or both. From 1998 to 2013 during the Bowl Championship Series (BCS) era, the trophy was awarded to the winner of the BCS National Championship Game.

With the advent of the College Football Playoff (CFP), the winner of the CFP National Championship automatically wins the MacArthur Bowl; the trophy is presented to the winning head coach in a ceremony held at the College Football Hall of Fame in the spring following the championship game.

== Winners ==
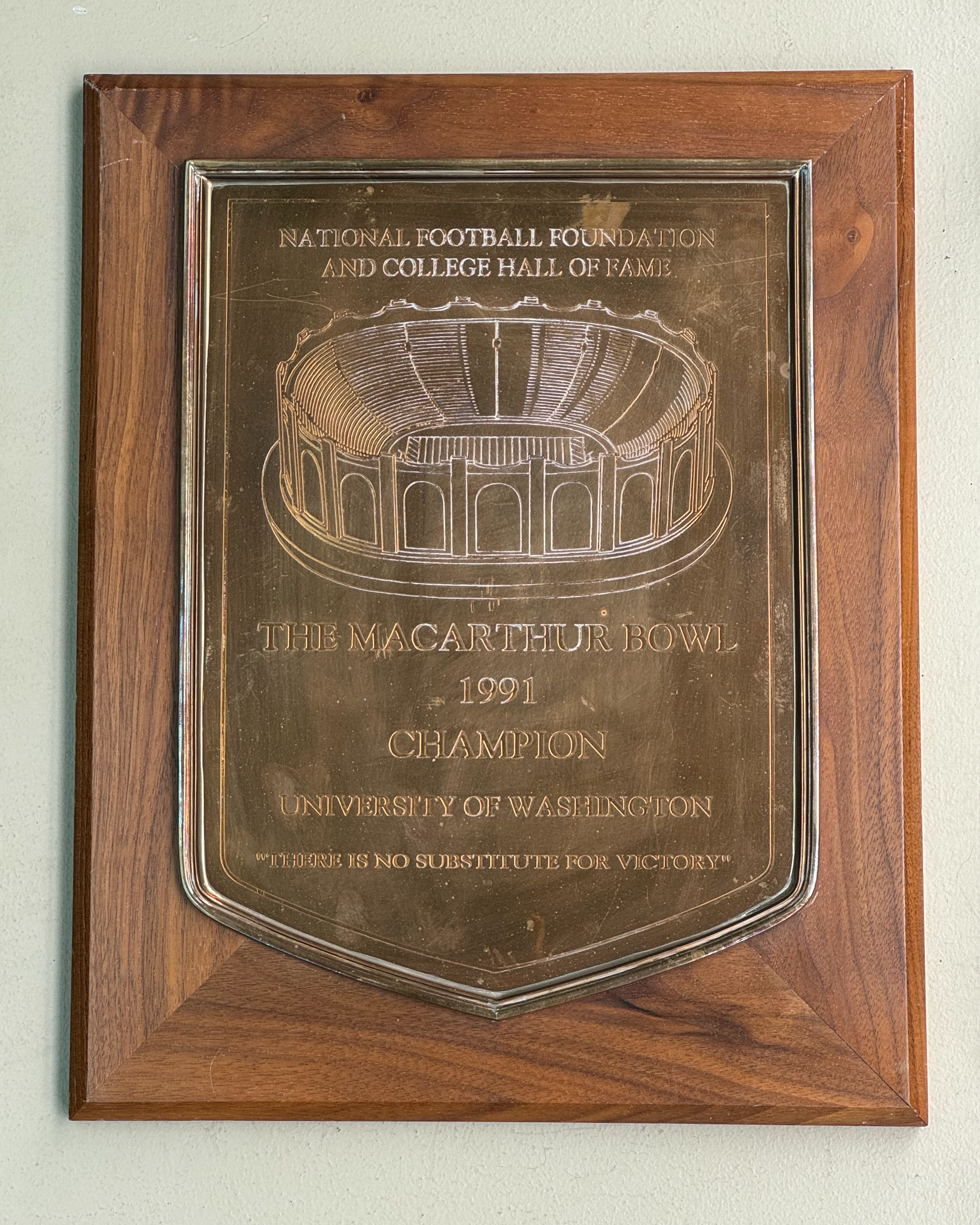
1991 MacArthur Bowl plaque awarded to Washington.

| Season | Team | Conference | Head coach | Record |
|---|---|---|---|---|
| 1959 | Syracuse | Independent | Ben Schwartzwalder | 11–0 |
| 1960 | Minnesota | Big Ten | Murray Warmath | 8–2 |
| 1961 | Alabama | SEC | Bear Bryant | 11–0 |
| 1962 | USC | AAWU | John McKay | 11–0 |
| 1963 | Texas | Southwest | Darrell Royal | 11–0 |
| 1964 | Notre Dame | Independent | Ara Parseghian | 9–1 |
| 1965 | Michigan State | Big Ten | Duffy Daugherty | 9–1 |
| 1966 | Michigan State; Notre Dame (joint) | Big Ten; Independent | Duffy Daugherty; Ara Parseghian | 9–0–1; 9–0–1 |
| 1967 | USC | AAWU | John McKay | 10–1 |
| 1968 | Ohio State | Big Ten | Woody Hayes | 10–0 |
| 1969 | Texas | Southwest | Darrell Royal | 11–0 |
| 1970 | Ohio State; Texas (joint) | Big Ten; Southwest | Woody Hayes; Darrell Royal | 9–1; 10–1 |
| 1971 | Nebraska | Big 8 | Bob Devaney | 13–0 |
| 1972 | USC | Pac-8 | John McKay | 12–0 |
| 1973 | Notre Dame | Independent | Ara Parseghian | 11–0 |
| 1974 | USC | Pac-8 | John McKay | 10–1–1 |
| 1975 | Oklahoma | Big 8 | Barry Switzer | 11–1 |
| 1976 | Pittsburgh | Independent | Johnny Majors | 12–0 |
| 1977 | Notre Dame | Independent | Dan Devine | 11–1 |
| 1978 | Alabama | SEC | Bear Bryant | 11–1 |
| 1979 | Alabama | SEC | Bear Bryant | 12–0 |
| 1980 | Georgia | SEC | Vince Dooley | 12–0 |
| 1981 | Clemson | ACC | Danny Ford | 12–0 |
| 1982 | Penn State | Independent | Joe Paterno | 11–1 |
| 1983 | Miami (FL) | Independent | Howard Schnellenberger | 11–1 |
| 1984 | BYU | WAC | LaVell Edwards | 12–0 |
| 1985 | Oklahoma | Big 8 | Barry Switzer | 11–1 |
| 1986 | Penn State | Independent | Joe Paterno | 12–0 |
| 1987 | Miami (FL) | Independent | Jimmy Johnson | 12–0 |
| 1988 | Notre Dame | Independent | Lou Holtz | 12–0 |
| 1989 | Miami (FL) | Independent | Dennis Erickson | 11–1 |
| 1990 | Colorado | Big 8 | Bill McCartney | 11–1–1 |
| 1991 | Washington | Pac-10 | Don James | 12–0 |
| 1992 | Alabama | SEC | Gene Stallings | 13–0 |
| 1993 | Florida State | ACC | Bobby Bowden | 12–1 |
| 1994 | Nebraska | Big 8 | Tom Osborne | 13–0 |
| 1995 | Nebraska | Big 8 | Tom Osborne | 12–0 |
| 1996 | Florida | SEC | Steve Spurrier | 12–1 |
| 1997 | Michigan | Big Ten | Lloyd Carr | 12–0 |
| 1998 | Tennessee | SEC | Phillip Fulmer | 13–0 |
| 1999 | Florida State | ACC | Bobby Bowden | 12–0 |
| 2000 | Oklahoma | Big 12 | Bob Stoops | 13–0 |
| 2001 | Miami (FL) | Big East | Larry Coker | 12–0 |
| 2002 | Ohio State | Big Ten | Jim Tressel | 14–0 |
| 2003 | LSU | SEC | Nick Saban | 13–1 |
| 2004 | USC | Pac-10 | Pete Carroll | 13–0 |
| 2005 | Texas | Big 12 | Mack Brown | 13–0 |
| 2006 | Florida | SEC | Urban Meyer | 13–1 |
| 2007 | LSU | SEC | Les Miles | 12–2 |
| 2008 | Florida | SEC | Urban Meyer | 13–1 |
| 2009 | Alabama | SEC | Nick Saban | 14–0 |
| 2010 | Auburn | SEC | Gene Chizik | 14–0 |
| 2011 | Alabama | SEC | Nick Saban | 12–1 |
| 2012 | Alabama | SEC | Nick Saban | 13–1 |
| 2013 | Florida State | ACC | Jimbo Fisher | 14–0 |
| 2014 | Ohio State | Big Ten | Urban Meyer | 14–1 |
| 2015 | Alabama | SEC | Nick Saban | 14–1 |
| 2016 | Clemson | ACC | Dabo Swinney | 14–1 |
| 2017 | Alabama | SEC | Nick Saban | 13–1 |
| 2018 | Clemson | ACC | Dabo Swinney | 15–0 |
| 2019 | LSU | SEC | Ed Orgeron | 15–0 |
| 2020 | Alabama | SEC | Nick Saban | 13–0 |
| 2021 | Georgia | SEC | Kirby Smart | 14-1 |
| 2022 | Georgia | SEC | Kirby Smart | 15-0 |
| 2023 | Michigan | Big Ten | Jim Harbaugh | 15–0 |
| 2024 | Ohio State | Big Ten | Ryan Day | 14–2 |
| 2025 | Indiana | Big Ten | Curt Cignetti | 16-0 |

=== By team ===
| Team | Number | Seasons |
|---|---|---|
| Alabama | 10 | 1961, 1978, 1979, 1992, 2009, 2011, 2012, 2015, 2017, 2020 |
| USC | 5 | 1962, 1967, 1972, 1974, 2004 |
| Notre Dame | 5 | 1964, 1966, 1973, 1977, 1988 |
| Ohio State | 5 | 1968, 1970, 2002, 2014, 2024 |
| Miami (FL) | 4 | 1983, 1987, 1989, 2001 |
| Texas | 4 | 1963, 1969, 1970, 2005 |
| Clemson | 3 | 1981, 2016, 2018 |
| Florida | 3 | 1996, 2006, 2008 |
| Florida State | 3 | 1993, 1999, 2013 |
| LSU | 3 | 2003, 2007, 2019 |
| Nebraska | 3 | 1971, 1994, 1995 |
| Oklahoma | 3 | 1975, 1985, 2000 |
| Georgia | 3 | 1980, 2021, 2022 |
| Michigan | 2 | 1997, 2023 |
| Michigan State | 2 | 1965, 1966 |
| Penn State | 2 | 1982, 1986 |
| Auburn | 1 | 2010 |
| BYU | 1 | 1984 |
| Colorado | 1 | 1990 |
| Indiana | 1 | 2025 |
| Minnesota | 1 | 1960 |
| Pittsburgh | 1 | 1976 |
| Syracuse | 1 | 1959 |
| Tennessee | 1 | 1998 |
| Washington | 1 | 1991 |
