= Michigan State–Notre Dame football rivalry =

American college football rivalry

Michigan State-Notre Dame football rivalry
- Michigan State Spartans Notre Dame Fighting Irish
- First meeting: November 25, 1897; Notre Dame, 34–6
- Latest meeting: September 19, 2026; Notre Dame, 27–10
- Next meeting: September 18, 2027, in East Lansing
- Stadiums: Notre Dame Stadium; South Bend, Indiana, U.S. Spartan Stadium; East Lansing, Michigan, U.S.
- Trophy: None (1897–1948); Megaphone Trophy (1949–present)

Statistics
- Total meetings: 80
- All-time series: Notre Dame leads, 48–29–1 (.622)
- Trophy series: Notre Dame leads, 34–27–1 (.556)
- Largest victory: Notre Dame, 53–0 (1898)
- Longest win streak: Notre Dame, 8 (1897–1909, 1987–1994); Michigan State, 8 (1955–1963)
- Current win streak: Notre Dame, 2 (2017–present)

Locations of Michigan State and Notre Dame

The Battle for the Megaphone is an American college football rivalry between the Michigan State Spartans and Notre Dame Fighting Irish. The first game between the teams took place on November 25, 1897. Notre Dame leads the all-time series 48–29–1.

Since 1949, the teams competed for the Megaphone Trophy, a trophy introduced by the Alumni Clubs of Notre Dame and Michigan State to be presented to the winner of the game. Notre Dame leads the Megaphone Trophy series 34–27–1.

The Notre Dame side of the trophy is blue, while the Michigan State side is green, and the year of the game and teams' respective scores running down the middle. The current trophy is the third trophy as the prior two trophies no longer have space for the respective games to be included.

The rivalry includes several notable games, such as the 1966 game, arguably one of the greatest college football games ever played. Notre Dame currently leads the series. Games played prior to 1949 also appear on the trophy to commemorate the entire series. Notre Dame is the current holder of the trophy, with a 27–10 victory on September 19, 2026. They will hold the Megaphone Trophy until 2027 when the two teams are scheduled to play again.

== Recent games ==
After an 8–0 series run by Notre Dame from 1987 to 1994, tying the series win streak set by Michigan State from 1955 to 1963 (they didn't meet in 1958), Michigan State won five games in a row. Michigan State won 44–41 in double overtime at Notre Dame in 2005. Notre Dame pulled out a thrilling come from behind 40–37 victory in East Lansing in 2006. The trend continued in 2007 for Michigan State under new head coach Mark Dantonio who defeated the Fighting Irish 31–14, recording MSU's sixth straight victory at Notre Dame. On September 20, 2008, MSU defeated Notre Dame 23–7 in East Lansing, ending the series "jinx" of home teams always losing since 2001. Notre Dame returned the favor the following year by defeating MSU at Notre Dame. The 2010 meeting had one of the most exciting finishes to the start of the college football season. A back and forth battle the entire game, Notre Dame took the lead in overtime off of a field goal. After Spartans quarterback Kirk Cousins was sacked on third down, Michigan State lined up for a field goal to tie the game at 31. They faked it, and the holder Aaron Bates tossed a game-winning touchdown pass to Charlie Gantt to win it 34–31 for the Spartans. In 2011, the Irish reclaimed the trophy with a 31–13 victory in which they led all the way. Notre Dame's 17–13 victory in South Bend in 2013 made it three wins in a row for the Irish. The teams renewed the rivalry in 2016, as No. 12 Michigan State reclaimed the trophy by defeating No. 18 Notre Dame in South Bend 36–28.

In 2017, Notre Dame traveled to East Lansing to take on the Spartans once again. Notre Dame quarterback Brandon Wimbush threw for a touchdown and ran for another as Notre Dame routed Michigan State 38–18. Notre Dame's defense forced three turnovers in the game, including an interception thrown by MSU QB Brian Lewerke. The interception was returned for a touchdown by Irish defensive back Julian Love on MSU's first possession, giving the Irish an early 14–0 lead. Both teams then swapped touchdown drives. Down 21–7, Michigan State drove deep into Notre Dame territory, and appeared to score to make it a one touchdown game as running back LJ Scott rumbled into the endzone late in the first half. However, Scott had the ball jarred free at the half-yard line by Notre Dame defensive back Shawn Crawford. Crawford also recovered the forced fumble in the end zone, resulting in a touch back. The play resulted in a 14-point swing, as Notre Dame drove the length of the field in just four plays, taking a commanding 28–7 lead into halftime off of the three devastating Michigan State turnovers.

== Game results ==
Michigan State victories	Notre Dame victories	Tie games	Vacated wins (Note: Notre Dame's wins in 2012 and 2013 were vacated as a result of NCAA sanctions against the Notre Dame football program issued on November 22, 2016, after the NCAA found that a student-trainer committed academic misconduct for two football players and provided six other players with impermissible academic extra benefits. The NCAA also rejected Notre Dame's appeal on February 13, 2018. This win is not included in Notre Dame's all-time record, nor is it counted in the series record between the two teams. See Wikipedia:WikiProject College football/Vacated victories for an explanation of how vacated victories are recorded.)

No.	Date	Location	Winning team		Losing team	
1	November 25, 1897	South Bend, IN	Notre Dame	34	Michigan State	6
2	October 15, 1898	South Bend, IN	Notre Dame	53	Michigan State	0
3	September 30, 1899	South Bend, IN	Notre Dame	40	Michigan State	0
4	September 27, 1902	South Bend, IN	Notre Dame	33	Michigan State	0
5	October 3, 1903	South Bend, IN	Notre Dame	12	Michigan State	0
6	October 7, 1905	South Bend, IN	Notre Dame	28	Michigan State	0
7	October 27, 1906	South Bend, IN	Notre Dame	5	Michigan State	0
8	October 23, 1909	South Bend, IN	Notre Dame	17	Michigan State	0
9	October 29, 1910	East Lansing, MI	Michigan Agricultural	17	Notre Dame	0
10	November 18, 1916	East Lansing, MI	Notre Dame	14	Michigan State	0
11	November 17, 1917	South Bend, IN	Notre Dame	23	Michigan State	0
12	November 16, 1918	East Lansing, MI	Michigan Agricultural	13	Notre Dame	7
13	November 15, 1919	South Bend, IN	Notre Dame	13	Michigan State	0
14	November 25, 1920	East Lansing, MI	Notre Dame	25	Michigan State	0
15	November 24, 1921	South Bend, IN	Notre Dame	48	Michigan State	0
16	October 9, 1948	South Bend, IN	No. 1 Notre Dame	26	Michigan State	7
17	November 5, 1949	East Lansing, MI	No. 1 Notre Dame	34	No. 10 Michigan State	21
18	October 28, 1950	South Bend, IN	No. 15 Michigan State	36	Notre Dame	33
19	November 10, 1951	East Lansing, MI	No. 5 Michigan State	35	No. 11 Notre Dame	0
20	November 15, 1952	East Lansing, MI	No. 1 Michigan State	21	No. 6 Notre Dame	3
21	October 16, 1954	South Bend, IN	No. 8 Notre Dame	20	Michigan State	19
22	October 15, 1955	East Lansing, MI	No. 13 Michigan State	21	No. 4 Notre Dame	7
23	October 20, 1956	South Bend, IN	No. 2 Michigan State	47	Notre Dame	14
24	November 9, 1957	East Lansing, MI	No. 4 Michigan State	34	No. 15 Notre Dame	6
25	October 17, 1959	East Lansing, MI	Michigan State	19	Notre Dame	0
26	October 15, 1960	South Bend, IN	No. 14 Michigan State	21	Notre Dame	0
27	October 21, 1961	East Lansing, MI	No. 1 Michigan State	17	No. 6 Notre Dame	7
28	October 20, 1962	South Bend, IN	Michigan State	31	Notre Dame	7
29	November 16, 1963	East Lansing, MI	No. 4 Michigan State	12	Notre Dame	7
30	November 14, 1964	South Bend, IN	No. 1 Notre Dame	34	Michigan State	7
31	November 20, 1965	South Bend, IN	No. 1 Michigan State	12	No. 4 Notre Dame	3
32	November 19, 1966	East Lansing, MI	Tie	10	Tie	10
33	October 28, 1967	South Bend, IN	Notre Dame	24	Michigan State	12
34	October 26, 1968	East Lansing, MI	Michigan State	21	No. 5 Notre Dame	17
35	October 4, 1969	South Bend, IN	Notre Dame	42	No. 14 Michigan State	28
36	October 3, 1970	East Lansing, MI	No. 4 Notre Dame	29	Michigan State	0
37	October 2, 1971	South Bend, IN	No. 4 Notre Dame	14	Michigan State	2
38	October 7, 1972	East Lansing, MI	No. 7 Notre Dame	16	Michigan State	0
39	October 6, 1973	South Bend, IN	No. 8 Notre Dame	14	Michigan State	10
40	October 5, 1974	East Lansing, MI	No. 7 Notre Dame	19	Michigan State	14
41	October 4, 1975	South Bend, IN	Michigan State	10	No. 8 Notre Dame	3

No.	Date	Location	Winning team		Losing team	
42	October 2, 1976	East Lansing, MI	No. 18 Notre Dame	24	Michigan State	6
43	October 1, 1977	South Bend, IN	No. 14 Notre Dame	16	Michigan State	6
44	October 7, 1978	East Lansing, MI	Notre Dame	29	Michigan State	25
45	September 29, 1979	South Bend, IN	No. 15 Notre Dame	27	No. 7 Michigan State	3
46	October 4, 1980	East Lansing, MI	No. 7 Notre Dame	26	Michigan State	21
47	October 3, 1981	South Bend, IN	Notre Dame	20	Michigan State	7
48	October 2, 1982	East Lansing, MI	No. 11 Notre Dame	11	Michigan State	3
49	September 17, 1983	South Bend, IN	Michigan State	28	No. 4 Notre Dame	23
50	September 15, 1984	East Lansing, MI	Notre Dame	24	Michigan State	20
51	September 21, 1985	South Bend, IN	Notre Dame	27	Michigan State	10
52	September 20, 1986	East Lansing, MI	Michigan State	20	No. 20 Notre Dame	15
53	September 19, 1987	South Bend, IN	No. 9 Notre Dame	31	No. 17 Michigan State	8
54	September 17, 1988	East Lansing, MI	No. 8 Notre Dame	20	Michigan State	3
55	September 23, 1989	South Bend, IN	No. 1 Notre Dame	21	Michigan State	13
56	September 22, 1990	East Lansing, MI	No. 1 Notre Dame	20	No. 24 Michigan State	19
57	September 21, 1991	South Bend, IN	No. 11 Notre Dame	49	Michigan State	10
58	September 19, 1992	East Lansing, MI	No. 7 Notre Dame	52	Michigan State	31
59	September 18, 1993	South Bend, IN	No. 4 Notre Dame	36	Michigan State	14
60	September 17, 1994	East Lansing, MI	No. 8 Notre Dame	21	Michigan State	20
61	September 20, 1997	South Bend, IN	No. 17 Michigan State	23	Notre Dame	7
62	September 12, 1998	East Lansing, MI	Michigan State	45	No. 10 Notre Dame	23
63	September 18, 1999	South Bend, IN	Michigan State	23	No. 24 Notre Dame	13
64	September 23, 2000	East Lansing, MI	No. 23 Michigan State	27	No. 16 Notre Dame	21
65	September 22, 2001	South Bend, IN	Michigan State	17	No. 23 Notre Dame	10
66	September 21, 2002	East Lansing, MI	No. 12 Notre Dame	21	Michigan State	17
67	September 20, 2003	South Bend, IN	Michigan State	22	Notre Dame	16
68	September 18, 2004	East Lansing, MI	Notre Dame	31	Michigan State	24
69	September 17, 2005	South Bend, IN	Michigan State	44	No. 10 Notre Dame	41^{2OT}
70	September 23, 2006	East Lansing, MI	No. 12 Notre Dame	40	Michigan State	37
71	September 22, 2007	South Bend, IN	Michigan State	31	Notre Dame	14
72	September 20, 2008	East Lansing, MI	Michigan State	23	Notre Dame	7
73	September 19, 2009	South Bend, IN	Notre Dame	33	Michigan State	30
74	September 18, 2010	East Lansing, MI	Michigan State	34	Notre Dame	31^{OT}
75	September 17, 2011	South Bend, IN	Notre Dame	31	No. 15 Michigan State	13
76	September 15, 2012	East Lansing, MI	No. 20 Notre Dame^{†}	20	No. 10 Michigan State	3
77	September 21, 2013	South Bend, IN	No. 22 Notre Dame^{†}	17	Michigan State	13
78	September 17, 2016	South Bend, IN	No. 12 Michigan State	36	No. 18 Notre Dame	28
79	September 23, 2017	East Lansing, MI	Notre Dame	38	Michigan State	18
80	September 19, 2026	South Bend, IN	#3 Notre Dame	27	Michigan State	10
Series: Notre Dame leads 48–29–1
† Vacated by Notre Dame.

== See also ==
- List of NCAA college football rivalry games
