= George Goeddeke =

American football player (born 1945)

No. 67
- Positions: Guard, Center, Tackle

Personal information
- Born: July 29, 1945 (age 81); Detroit, Michigan, U.S.
- Listed height: 6 ft 3 in (1.91 m)
- Listed weight: 253 lb (115 kg)

Career information
- High school: St. David's (Detroit)
- College: Notre Dame (1963-1966)
- NFL draft: 1967: 3rd round, 59th overall pick

Career history
- Denver Broncos (1967-1972)

Awards and highlights
- AFL All-Star (1969); 2× National champion (1964, 1966); Second-team All-American (1966)

Career NFL/AFL statistics
- Games played: 66
- Games started: 60
- Fumble recoveries: 2
- Stats at Pro Football Reference

George Goeddeke (/ˈɡɛdɛkiː/ GED-eh-kee; born July 29, 1945) is an American former professional football player who was an offensive lineman for the Denver Broncos in the American Football League (AFL) and National Football League (NFL) in the 1960s and 1970s. He played college football for the Notre Dame Fighting Irish. Playing with Denver, Goeddeke was an AFL All-Star in 1969. He was a second-team All-American as a senior at Notre Dame, and played in the 1964 Chicago College All-Star Game.

== Early life ==
Goeddeke was born on July 29, 1945, in Detroit, Michigan. He was one of 13 children. He attended St. David High School in Detroit. Goeddeke played on the school's football and basketball teams.

As a 15-year old sophomore in 1960, he was a 6 ft 2 in (1.88 m) 195 lb (88.5 kg) center on the football team. In November 1960, he was selected All-Division at center on the Catholic League Second Division All-Star Team, and was named All-East. Goeddeke was switched to fullback in 1961, and he received All-State mention in football that year. As a senior in 1962, he was a 6 ft 2 in 210 lb (95.3 kg) fullback, and was named to the Catholic League All-First Division team as a fullback.

Goeddeke was also a star player on St. David's basketball team. In an early March 1963 game he scored a school single game record of 51 points. He was named to the Catholic League's All-East basketball team in 1963.

== College career ==
Goeddeke attended the University of Notre Dame, where he played football for the Fighting Irish as an offensive lineman. He played on the freshman team in 1963, and for the varsity from 1964 to 1966. He was a reserve lineman on the 1964 Notre Dame team. Notre Dame was 9–1 in 1964, and ranked No. 3 in the final Associated Press (AP) poll. He started at center for Notre Dame as a junior in 1965, until undergoing an appendectomy in November 1965.

Goeddeke entered his senior season (1966) as a 228 lb (103.4 kg) center. In 1966, United Press International (UPI) selected Goeddeke as a second-team All-American at center. He also was named an honorable mention All-American at center by the Associated Press and Newspaper Enterprise Association and was an honorable mention Central Press Captains' All-American.

Notre Dame was 9–0–1 in 1966. The AP ranked Notre Dame No. 1 for 1966, after tying No. 2 Michigan State, 10–0, on November 19, and then beating the University of Southern California, 51–0, the following week in their final game of the season. Goeddeke was injured in the first quarter of the Michigan State game and did not play the rest of the game. He was selected to play in the Chicago College All-Star Game against the Green Bay Packers in August 1964.

Goeddeke was considered the team "cut up" at Notre Dame, and was known among his teammates for his sometimes outlandish hijinks; being called "Mouse" or "Mr Clean" by his teammates. Goedekke later described himself as being "very uninhibited". He would spontaneously perform animal imitations during practice, and dance jigs to the Fighting Irish band. Among other things, Goeddeke once had his head shaved, and later let the hair on the sides of his head grow out before St. Patrick's Day and then cut into the shape of shamrocks and dyed green for the holiday. He was also the target of his teammates' practical jokes. His behaviors had a more meaningful purpose to his teammates, as fullback Larry Conjar said "Goeddeke kept the team together". Coach Ara Parseghian ran a strict and disciplined program, but Goedekke believed the coach understood Goedekke's antics helped relieve some of the pressure on the players, which was important to the team.

== Professional career ==
The Denver Broncos drafted Goeddeke in the third round of the 1967 NFL/AFL draft, 59th overall. The Broncos played the 240 lb (108.9 kg) Goeddeke at offensive guard during the 1967 preseason, under head coach Lou Saban. The Broncos released Goeddeke in early September, but kept Goeddeke on their taxi squad to begin the 1967 AFL season. The Broncos activated Goeddeke to join the team's roster at the end of September, before the Broncos' fifth game that season. He started five of his ten games on the Broncos that year at left guard, after winning the starting left guard position late in the season.

Goeddeke was the Broncos' starting left guard in all 14 games each year from 1968 to 1970. In 1969, he was selected to play in the AFL All-Star Game. Goeddeke missed the first two games of the 1971 season after suffering a back injury in the last 1971 preseason game. He returned to start the third game of the season at left guard. During that game, Broncos' center Larry Kaminski suffered a broken leg and Goeddeke replaced him at center. It was the first time Goeddeke had played center since the November 1966 game between Notre Dame and USC. Kaminski did not play another game that year, and Goeddeke was the team's starting center for the remainder of the 1971 season.

Goeddeke suffered a knee injury during the second game of the 1972 season that required knee surgery and ended his season. He never played another game in the NFL. In July 1973, he had another surgery on his injured knee. Goeddeke announced his retirement in August 1974, after failing to pass a physical examination.

During his professional career, Goeddeke started 60 games. He spent three years in the AFL (1967 to 1969), and three years in the NFL after the leagues merged (1970 to 1972). The NFL officially lists him as having played at 6 ft 3 in (1.91 m) 253 lb (115 kg).

== Personal life ==
After retiring from the Broncos he sold investment appraisals in the Detroit area. Goedekke and his wife Geneva had six children, living in Detroit. He was involved in a lawsuit against the Denver Broncos involving allegations of the cumulative effect of traumatic head injuries on players' health. He and Geneva were plaintiffs in a 2011 lawsuit against the NFL and football helmet manufacturers, filed in the Los Angeles County Superior Court. They sought damages for alleged concussion related harms and chronic traumatic encephalopathy, that were the result of multiple concussions which were improperly diagnosed and treated, and for failures to warn Goeddeke adequately about the dangers presented by head trauma while playing in the NFL.

== See also ==
- Other American Football League players
