= Steve Quinn =

American football player (born 1946)

No. 54
- Position: Center

Personal information
- Born: February 11, 1946 (age 80); Pittsburg, Kansas, U.S.
- Listed height: 6 ft 1 in (1.85 m)
- Listed weight: 225 lb (102 kg)

Career information
- High school: Loyola Academy (Wilmette, Illinois)
- College: Notre Dame (1964-1967)
- NFL draft: 1968: undrafted

Career history
- Houston Oilers (1968)

Awards and highlights
- National champion (1966)

Career AFL statistics
- Games played: 9
- Stats at Pro Football Reference

Stephen Timothy Quinn (born February 11, 1946) is an American former professional football player who was a center for one season with the Houston Oilers of the American Football League (AFL). He played college football for the Notre Dame Fighting Irish.
