= Jim Lynch =

American football player (1945–2022)

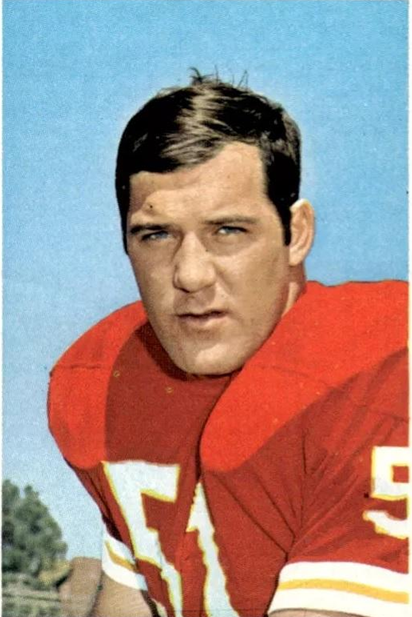
- Lynch in 1971

No. 51
- Position: Linebacker

Personal information
- Born: August 28, 1945; Lima, Ohio, U.S.
- Died: July 21, 2022 (aged 76); Kansas City, Missouri, U.S.
- Listed height: 6 ft 1 in (1.85 m)
- Listed weight: 235 lb (107 kg)

Career information
- High school: Central Catholic (Lima)
- College: Notre Dame (1964–1966)
- NFL draft: 1967: 2nd round, 47th overall pick

Career history
- Kansas City Chiefs (1967–1977)

Awards and highlights
- Super Bowl champion (IV); AFL champion (1969); 2× Second-team All-AFL (1968, 1969); AFL All-Star (1968); Kansas City Chiefs Hall of Fame; National Champion (1966); Maxwell Award (1966); Unanimous All-American (1966); Second-team All-American (1965)

Career AFL/NFL statistics
- Sacks: 18
- Interceptions: 17
- Interception yards: 191
- Fumble recoveries: 14
- Defensive touchdowns: 1
- Stats at Pro Football Reference
- College Football Hall of Fame

James Robert Lynch (August 28, 1945 – July 21, 2022) was an American professional football linebacker who played in both the American Football League (AFL) and the National Football League (NFL) for 11 seasons with the Kansas City Chiefs. He played college football for the Notre Dame Fighting Irish, where he was named an All-American and won the Maxwell Award in 1966. He was inducted into the College Football Hall of Fame in 1992.

== Early life ==
Lynch was born in Lima, Ohio. He graduated from Lima Central Catholic High School in 1963. Lynch played for the football and basketball teams.

== College career ==
Lynch played college football at the University of Notre Dame. Leading the Fighting Irish in tackles with 108 in 1965 and 106 in 1966, he was the defensive captain of the national champion 1966 Irish team. He received the Maxwell Award as the nation's best college football player in 1966. He was also a unanimous All-American selection that year.

== Professional career ==
The Kansas City Chiefs selected Lynch 47th overall in the second round of the 1967 NFL/AFL draft. From 1967 to 1977, Lynch played for the Chiefs as a right outside linebacker, playing alongside middle linebacker Willie Lanier and left outside linebacker Bobby Bell, both Pro Football Hall of Famers. These linebackers led the defense in the Chiefs' first Super Bowl victory in 1969.

Retiring at the end of the 1977 season, Lynch finished his career with 18 sacks, (Note: Sacks were not an official stat until 1982. All sack stats from before that year are unofficial.) 17 interceptions and 14 fumble recoveries. He also scored one touchdown.

== Honors ==
Lynch was selected to play in the 1968 AFL All-Star Game.

In 1988, Lynch was inducted as an inaugural member into the Lima Central Catholic Hall of Fame for athletic achievement. In 1990, Lynch was inducted into the Chiefs' Hall of Fame. He was inducted into the College Football Hall of Fame in 1992. In 2006, Lynch was interviewed for the NFL Network documentary America's Game: The Super Bowl Champions chronicling the 1969 Kansas City Chiefs AFL and World Championship season.

== Personal life ==
Lynch and his wife had three children. His older brother, Tom, was a center and captain for the 1963 Navy football team.

Lynch died on July 21, 2022, at the age of 76.
