= LaVerne Allers =

American football player

Profile
- Position: G

Personal information
- Born: c. 1945; Davenport, Iowa, U.S.
- Listed height: 6 ft 0 in (1.83 m)
- Listed weight: 209 lb (95 kg)

Career information
- College: University of Nebraska

Career history
- 1964–1966: Nebraska

Awards and highlights
- Consensus All-American (1966); 2× First-team All-Big Eight (1965, 1966)

LaVerne Allers (born c. 1945) is an American former football guard at the University of Nebraska. He was a consensus All-American in 1966.

== Early life ==
Allers was born in Davenport, Iowa around 1945 to Mr. and Mrs. Louis Allers. He attend Davenport West High School where he was fullback on the football team under coach Bob Liddy. He also lettered twice in both basketball and wrestling.

== College career ==
Allers attended the University of Nebraska and majored in soil conservation. He lettered for the Nebraska Cornhuskers football team under coach Bob Devaney during the 1964, 1965, and 1966 seasons. He made the All-Big Eight team in both 1965 and 1966. In his senior year, as a 6-foot, 0-inch, 209-pound guard, Allers was recognized as a consensus first-team All-American, having received first-team honors from several publications and organizations including the Associated Press (AP), and United Press International (UPI).
