= Terry Hanratty =

American football player (born 1948)

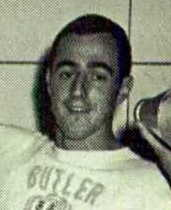
- Hanratty at Butler High School in 1965

No. 5
- Position: Quarterback

Personal information
- Born: January 19, 1948 (age 78); Butler, Pennsylvania, U.S.
- Listed height: 6 ft 1 in (1.85 m)
- Listed weight: 210 lb (95 kg)

Career information
- High school: Butler
- College: Notre Dame (1966–1968)
- NFL draft: 1969: 2nd round, 30th overall pick

Career history
- Pittsburgh Steelers (1969–1975); Tampa Bay Buccaneers (1976)

Awards and highlights
- 2× Super Bowl champion (IX, X); National champion (1966); Sammy Baugh Trophy (1967); Consensus All-American (1968)

Career NFL statistics
- Passing attempts: 431
- Passing completions: 165
- Completion percentage: 38.3%
- TD–INT: 24–35
- Passing yards: 2,510
- Passer rating: 43
- Stats at Pro Football Reference
- College Football Hall of Fame

Terrence Hugh Hanratty (born January 19, 1948) is an American former professional football player who was a quarterback in the National Football League (NFL) during the 1960s and 1970s. He played college football for the Notre Dame Fighting Irish, earning consensus All-American honors in 1968. He won two Super Bowls with the Pittsburgh Steelers as a backup quarterback. He was inducted into the College Football Hall of Fame in 2025.

== College career ==
Hanratty attended St. Paul Butler Catholic School and Butler Senior High School in western Pennsylvania before attending the University of Notre Dame, where he was a three-year starter and twice an All-American, as well as a Heisman Trophy candidate. Hanratty and Jim Seymour formed a passing/receiving duo leading Notre Dame to the national championship in 1966. Hanratty was also a teammate and friend of halfback Rocky Bleier at Notre Dame before the two were teammates in Pittsburgh.

== Professional career ==
In 1969, Hanratty was selected in the second round of the NFL draft by the Steelers' new head coach, Chuck Noll, and was the starting quarterback for a short time before losing the job to the Steelers' No. 1 1970 overall draft pick Terry Bradshaw. Hanratty was the last Pittsburgh-area native to start a game at quarterback for the Steelers, until Homestead native Charlie Batch filled in for an injured Ben Roethlisberger for two games during the team's Super Bowl-winning season in 2005. Hanratty suited up for Super Bowl IX, but did not see action.

In 1975, Hanratty played in only one regular season game, for only two plays. However, he played more in the postseason, getting into two playoff games. In the AFC Championship Game he finished the game at quarterback, taking the Steelers' last two offensive snaps, after Bradshaw was hurt. He also finished Super Bowl X at quarterback in what turned out to be his last game as a Steeler, taking the team's last four offensive snaps.

Hanratty was placed on waivers by the Steelers in September 1976 and picked up in October by the expansion Tampa Bay Buccaneers, who lost every game they played that season. As the backup quarterback to Steve Spurrier, Hanratty made a handful of appearances, and his sole start came in Week 13 against his old team, the Pittsburgh Steelers. Hanratty was pulled in favor of Spurrier after throwing just four passes: one was intercepted, two incomplete, and one caught for a one-yard loss. The 42–0 defeat was Hanratty's last appearance in the NFL; he retired after the 1976 season.

He finished his career with 2,510 passing yards, 24 touchdown passes, and 35 interceptions. He completed 38 percent of his pass attempts, which led to an overall quarterback rating of 43.0.

== Personal life ==
Hanratty's son Conor also played football at Notre Dame as an offensive guard.
