= Kevin Hardy (defensive tackle) =

American football player (1945–2024)

No. 86, 73, 80
- Position: Defensive tackle

Personal information
- Born: July 28, 1945; Oakland, California, U.S.
- Died: May 6, 2024 (aged 78); Danville, California, U.S.
- Listed height: 6 ft 5 in (1.96 m)
- Listed weight: 276 lb (125 kg)

Career information
- High school: St. Elizabeth (Oakland)
- College: Notre Dame
- NFL draft: 1968: 1st round, 7th overall pick

Career history
- San Francisco 49ers (1968); Green Bay Packers (1970); San Diego Chargers (1971–1972)

Awards and highlights
- 2× National champion (1964, 1966); First-team All-American (1967); Second-team All-American (1966); Third-team All-American (1964)

Career NFL statistics
- Fumble recoveries: 1
- Sacks: 5
- Stats at Pro Football Reference

Kevin Thomas Hardy (July 28, 1945 – May 6, 2024) was an American professional football player who was a defensive tackle in the National Football League (NFL). He was selected by the New Orleans Saints in the first round (7th pick overall) of the 1968 NFL draft. He was an All-American out of Notre Dame where he also lettered in basketball and baseball.

Hardy played in the NFL for four seasons and never for the team that drafted him. He was sent along with a 1969 first-round selection (7th overall–Ted Kwalick) as part of a compensation package to the San Francisco 49ers as a result of the Saints signing free agent Dave Parks. This was the second of only four times the NFL exercised the Rozelle rule. He appeared in most games during these seasons but was unable to force his way into the starting lineup.

In September 1970, the 49ers traded Hardy to Green Bay in exchange for a second-round pick in the 1971 NFL draft. In June 1972, Green Bay traded Hardy to the San Diego Chargers in exchange for a first-round draft pick in 1972.

Hardy was a member of The Pigskin Club Of Washington, D.C. National Intercollegiate All-American Football Players Honor Roll. He died in Danville, California on May 6, 2024, at the age of 78.
