= Tom Regner =

American football player (1944–2014)

No. 60
- Position: Guard

Personal information
- Born: April 19, 1944; Kenosha, Wisconsin, U.S.
- Died: November 13, 2014 (aged 70); Reno, Nevada, U.S.
- Listed height: 6 ft 1 in (1.85 m)
- Listed weight: 235 lb (107 kg)

Career information
- High school: St. Joseph (Kenosha)
- College: Notre Dame (1963–1966)
- NFL draft: 1967: 1st round, 23rd overall pick

Career history
- Houston Oilers (1967–1972); Houston Texans-Shreveport Steamer (1974)

Awards and highlights
- National champion (1966); Consensus All-American (1966); Second-team All-American (1965)

Career NFL/AFL statistics
- Games played: 67
- Games started: 47
- Fumble recoveries: 1
- Stats at Pro Football Reference

Thomas Eugene Regner (April 19, 1944 – November 13, 2014) was an American professional football player who was a guard for six seasons with the Houston Oilers of the American Football League (AFL) and National Football League (NFL). He played college football for the Notre Dame Fighting Irish, earning consensus All-American honors in 1966. He was traded along with a 1973 third-round selection (61st overall–Bill Olds) from the Oilers to the Baltimore Colts for Bill Curry on January 29, 1973.
