= Pete Duranko =

American football player (1943–2011)

No. 55
- Positions: Defensive end, Defensive tackle

Personal information
- Born: December 15, 1943; Johnstown, Pennsylvania, U.S.
- Died: July 8, 2011 (aged 67); Windber, Pennsylvania, U.S.
- Listed height: 6 ft 2 in (1.88 m)
- Listed weight: 250 lb (113 kg)

Career information
- High school: Bishop McCort (Johnstown)
- College: Notre Dame (1963–1966)
- NFL draft: 1966: 4th round, 61st overall pick
- AFL draft: 1966: Red Shirt 2nd round, 12th overall pick

Career history
- Denver Broncos (1967–1974); Tampa Bay Buccaneers (1976)*
- * Offseason or practice squad member only

Awards and highlights
- 2× National champion (1964, 1966); First-team All-American (1966)

Career NFL/AFL statistics
- Fumble recoveries: 4
- Sacks: 32.5
- Stats at Pro Football Reference

Peter Nicholas Duranko (December 15, 1943 – July 8, 2011) was an American professional football player who was a defensive end for the Denver Broncos of the American Football League (AFL) and National Football League (NFL). He played college football for the Notre Dame Fighting Irish. Duranko was an All-American and a member of Notre Dame's 1966 national champion team. He was selected by the Broncos in the 1966 AFL draft and was also chosen by the Cleveland Browns in the fourth round of the NFL draft. He played in 98 games for Denver in an eight-year career from 1967 through 1974. After sitting out the 1975 season due to injury, he was one of the first free agent signings of the NFL's expansion Tampa Bay Buccaneers on January 27, 1976, however, he did not make the roster and was released by the Buccaneers on July 18, 1976, before the franchise played its first preseason game.

At Bishop McCort High School, he played football, ran track, and was a shot putter. He was inducted into the Pennsylvania State Hall of Fame.

Duranko earned a Master's degree from St. Francis University of Loretto, Pennsylvania. After his playing days, he became a steel company executive. Duranko died in 2011 from amyotrophic lateral sclerosis (ALS), which he had had since 2000. Postmortem research showed that Duranko had developed chronic traumatic encephalopathy. He was one of at least 345 NFL players to be diagnosed after death with this disease, which is caused by repeated hits to the head.

== See also ==
- List of American Football League players
- List of NFL players with chronic traumatic encephalopathy
