= Wayne Meylan =

American football player (1946–1987)

No. 59, 66
- Position: Linebacker

Personal information
- Born: March 2, 1946; Bay City, Michigan, U.S.
- Died: June 26, 1987 (aged 41); Grant, Michigan, U.S.
- Listed height: 6 ft 1 in (1.85 m)
- Listed weight: 237 lb (108 kg)

Career information
- High school: Central (Bay City)
- College: Nebraska (1964-1967)
- NFL draft: 1968: 4th round, 104th overall pick

Career history
- Cleveland Browns (1968–1969); Minnesota Vikings (1970)

Awards and highlights
- 2× Consensus All-American (1966, 1967); 2× First-team All-Big Eight (1966, 1967)

Career NFL statistics
- Fumble recoveries: 1
- Stats at Pro Football Reference
- College Football Hall of Fame

Wayne Meylan (March 2, 1946 – June 26, 1987) was an American football player. Before playing college football at the University of Nebraska–Lincoln, he attended T.L. Handy High School in Bay City, Michigan.

Meylan played middle guard on defense for the Nebraska Cornhuskers for three years, and the team had a 25–7 record in that time. He was a consensus All-American in 1966 and 1967. In 1966, he blocked three punts and recovered two for touchdowns. Meylan set Nebraska records for most tackles in a season and most tackles in a career. He played three years in the National Football League (NFL), from 1968 to 1970, then returned to Nebraska to complete work on his degree. He joined Engineered Systems, a company doing underground work for TV systems and phone companies. He then started Meylan Enterprises in Omaha, Nebraska. This company worked on contracts in 18 states. His hobby was flying World War II fighter planes in air shows.

On June 26, 1987, Meylan, age 41, was killed when his plane crashed in Ludington, Michigan. The National Transportation Safety Board ruled that the probable cause of the accident was wind shear. He is buried in the Prospect Hill Cemetery, Elkhorn, Nebraska. Meylan was inducted into the College Football Hall of Fame in 1991.
