= Arkansas Razorbacks football, 1960–1969 =

Contents:	1960 – 1961 – 1962 – 1963 – 1964 – 1965 – 1966 – 1967 – 1968 – 1969 – Game of the Century – Stats

== 1960–1969 statistical leaders ==
=== Passing ===
Year	Player	Com	Att	%	Yards
1960	George McKinney	39	90	43	728
1961	George McKinney	32	68	47	426
1962	Billy Moore	51	91	56	673
1963	Bill Gray	34	94	43	483
1964	Fred Marshall	50	94	53	656
1965	John Brittenum	75	149	50	1,103
1966	John Brittenum	76	143	53	1,103
1967	Ronny South	84	142	59	1,159
1968	Bill Montgomery	134	234	57	1,595
1969	Bill Montgomery	93	173	54	1,333

=== Rushing ===
Year	Player	Att	Yards	Avg
1960	Lance Alworth	106	375	3.5
1961	Lance Alworth	110	516	4.7
1962	Billy Moore	131	585	4.5
1963	Jim Lindsey	130	444	3.4
1964	Jack Brasuell	173	542	3.1
1965	Bobby Burnett	232	947	4.1
1966	David Dickey	115	447	3.9
1967	Russell Cody	95	383	4.0
1968	Bill Burnett	207	859	4.1
1969	Bill Burnett	209	900	4.3

=== Receiving ===
Year	Player	Rec	Yards	YPC
1960	Jimmy Collier	17	356	20.9
1961	Lance Alworth	18	320	17.8
1962	Jerry Lamb	23	378	16.4
1963	Jerry Lamb	16	240	15.0
1964	Jim Lindsey	24	331	13.8
1965	Bobby Crocket	30	487	16.2
1966	Tommy Burnett	29	401	13.8
1967	Max Peacock	30	468	15.6
1968	Max Peacock	39	497	12.7
1969	Chuck Dicus	42	688	16.4

== See also ==
- University of Arkansas
- Arkansas Razorbacks
- Arkansas Razorbacks football, 1950–59
- Arkansas Razorbacks football, 1970–79
- Cotton Bowl Classic
- Sugar Bowl
- Southwest Conference

== Notes ==
Arkansas Razorbacks Sports Network Online 1960–1969 Football Schedule/Results
