= Eric T. Hansen =

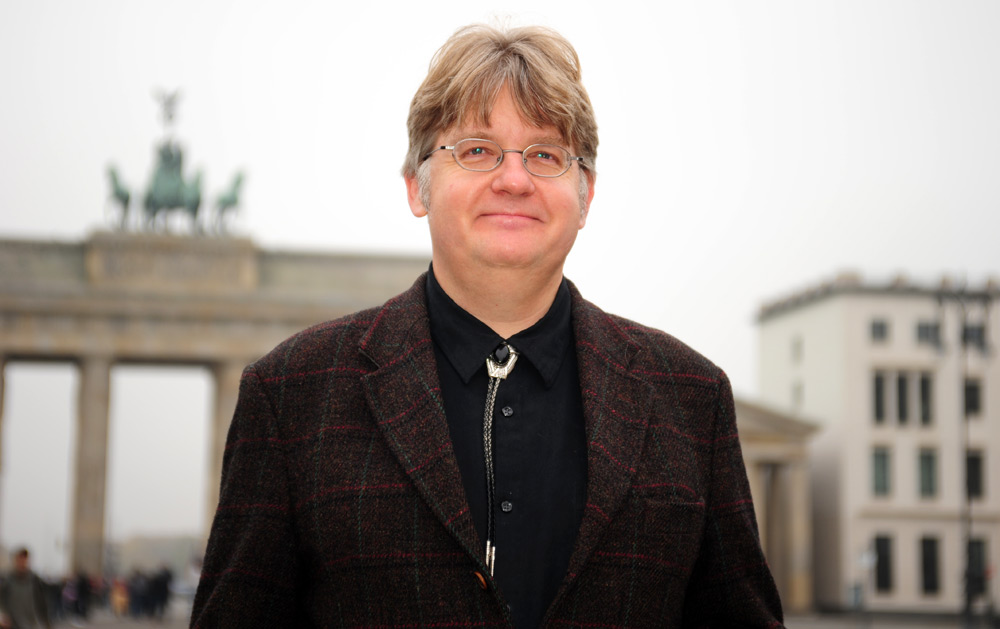
- Eric T. Hansen in 2008
- Born: 3 July 1960 (age 66); Bellingham, Washington, United States
- Occupation: Writer
- Website: http://www.ethansen.com/

Eric T. Hansen (born July 3, 1960) is a bilingual American writer known in Germany for his humorous non-fiction, critical satire and novels.

== Life ==
Eric T. Hansen was born in Bellingham, Washington, and moved with his family to Hawaii when he was six. He was raised a Mormon and served a two-year mission to West Germany from 1980, where he also met his future wife. He then returned to Germany to study at LMU Munich, where he earned a Masters in the literature of the German Middle Ages in 1989.

After leaving university, Hansen began a career as a freelance journalist writing about German politics, media and culture for American and British publications including The European, Variety, The Hollywood Reporter (where he was German Bureau Chief), The Washington Post.

In 2001 and 2002, he took a one-year trip through Germany in a VW Bus in search of the Middle Ages and turned his experiences into the travel book Die Nibelungenreise (The Nibelung Trip), which was published only in German. His second book, Planet Germany, about Germany through the eyes of an American and written in German, was a bestseller. Since then, he has continued writing books in German as well as articles for German publications including Cicero, Süddeutsche Zeitung, GEO and, currently, a political column for the online edition of the leading weekly German newspaper, Die Zeit. Starting with Planet Germany, Hansen has written all his books entirely in German with his co-writer and companion Astrid Ule, who had translated Nibelungenreise from English, and with whom Hansen writes thrillers under the pseudonym "Ule Hansen".

In 2015, Hansen launched his own publisher for English-language books, Hula Ink, and runs the YouTube-Channel "Poetry and Purpose" about philosophy, the getting of wisdom and German poetry (in English).

Hansen is divorced and is no longer a member of the LDS Church; he currently lives with Astrid Ule in Berlin.

== "The Hansen method" ==
Hansen’s books tend to combine journalistic research with political analysis and humor or even sarcasm and gravitate toward themes that question popular German attitudes. For example, while many Germans tend to think of themselves as "americanized" and as "critical thinkers", Hansen goes out of his way to prove that "americanization" is a myth and that "critical thinking" is often no more than a sophisticated way of complaining. While many Germans tend to perceive American conservatives in a negative light, Hansen in various articles during the 2012 US-presidential election explained the rationale behind the sometimes extreme positions of both parties and criticized the often one-sided perspective in the German press. The critic Henryk M. Broder in the newsweekly Der Spiegel has noted Hansen's fervor for attacking sacred cows and identified "the Hansen method" as forcing readers to view themselves from an unfamiliar and uncomfortable perspective.

== Hula Ink ==
In 2015 Hansen launched the small publishing house Hula Ink, specializing in literary fiction and non-fiction. In 2017, Hula Ink published its first print edition, Hansen's autobiographical book about Mormonism and spirituality, "Losing My Religion."

== Ule Hansen ==
In 2016, Hansen and Ule launched the Emma Carow series of thrillers set in Berlin under the pseudonym "Ule Hansen", which currently consists of Neuntöter, Blutbuche and Wassertöchter.

== Works ==
=== Non-fiction ===
- 2004 Die Nibelungenreise – Mit dem VW-Bus durchs Mittelalter (The Nibelungen Trip – Through the Middle Ages in a VW Bus)
- 2006 Planet Germany – Eine Expedition in die Heimat des Hawaii Toast (Planet Germany – An Expedition into the Homeland of Hawaii Toast)
- 2007 Deutschland-Quiz – Alles, was Sie über dieses Land wissen sollten und nie zu fragen wagten (Germany Quiz – Everything You Always Wanted to Know About this Country but Were Afraid to Ask)
- 2010 Nörgeln! Des Deutschen größte Lust (Nagging! The Greatest German Passion)
- 2011 Forbetter your English – Englisch für Deutsche (Forbetter Your English – English for Germans)
- 2012 Planet America – Ein Ami erklärt sein Land (Planet America – A Yankee Explains his Country)
- 2013 Die ängstliche Supermacht – Warum Deutschland endlich erwachsen werden muss (The Frightened Superpower – Why Germany Has to Grow Up)
- 2017 Losing My Religion – Why I Love and Left My Mormon Faith (English)

=== Novels ===
- 2009 Nibelungenfieber (Nibelung Fever) (by Eric T. Hansen and Astrid Ule)
- 2016 Neuntöter (Thriller with Astrid Ule under the pseudonym "Ule Hansen")
- 2018 Blutbuche (Thriller with Astrid Ule under the pseudonym "Ule Hansen")
- 2020 Wassertöchter (Thriller with Astrid Ule under the pseudonym "Ule Hansen")
