= Eric Hansen (sportswriter) =

American sportswriter

Eric C. Hansen is an American sportswriter with the South Bend Tribune. The University of Notre Dame football beat writer and an assistant sports editor for the newspaper, Hansen has also written two books on Notre Dame football. Stadium Stories: Notre Dame Fighting Irish: Colorful Tales of the Blue and Gold (2004) won a first-place prize for non-fiction books from the Indiana chapter of the Society of Professional Journalists. The book recounted many tales of Notre Dame's football history.

In 2005 Hansen published Notre Dame Fighting Irish: Where Have You Gone?, a collection of stories and interviews about former Notre Dame football players. Hansen has won a number of national writing awards from the Football Writers Association of America, and was a member of the FWAA committee that chose the 2006 college All-American team.

A Cleveland, Ohio native and a graduate of Ohio State University, Hansen has covered college sports since 1983. He was managing editor of the Irish Sports Report, a publication about Notre Dame sports, for seven years. He currently resides in South Bend, Indiana with his two sons.

== Bibliography ==
- Stadium Stories: Notre Dame Fighting Irish: Colorful Tales of the Blue and Gold (Globe Pequot 2004) ISBN 0-7627-3139-7
- Notre Dame Fighting Irish: Where Have You Gone? (Sports Publishing 2005) ISBN 1-58261-151-3
