= Bob Gladieux =

American football player (born 1947)

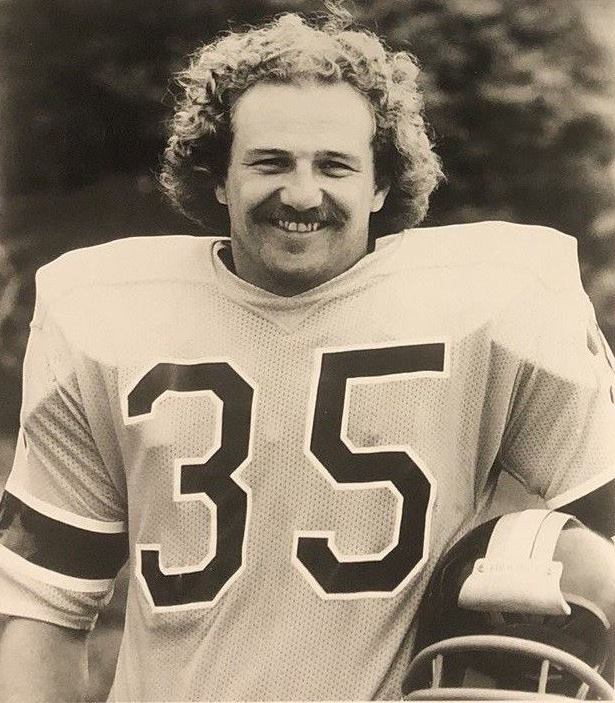

No. 24
- Position: Running back

Personal information
- Born: January 2, 1947 (age 79); Louisville, Ohio, U.S.
- Listed height: 5 ft 11 in (1.80 m)
- Listed weight: 195 lb (88 kg)

Career information
- High school: Louisville
- College: Notre Dame
- NFL draft: 1969: 8th round, 188th overall pick

Career history
- Boston Patriots (1969-1970); Buffalo Bills (1970); New England Patriots (1971–1972); New York Stars (1974)

Awards and highlights
- National champion (1966)

Career NFL/AFL statistics
- Rushing yards: 239
- Rushing average: 3.7
- Receptions: 25
- Receiving yards: 252
- Stats at Pro Football Reference

Robert Joseph Gladieux (born January 2, 1947) is an American former professional football player who was a running back in the American Football League (AFL) and National Football League (NFL) for the Boston Patriots, Buffalo Bills and New England Patriots. He played college football for the Notre Dame Fighting Irish. He also played in the World Football League (WFL) for the New York Stars. His nickname is "Harpo" due to his frizzy hairstyle which resembled that of Harpo Marx.

Gladieux caught a touchdown pass for the Irish in the "Game of the Century," a 10-10 tie between #1 Notre Dame and #2 Michigan State Spartans.

During his senior year at the University of Notre Dame, Gladieux scored 15 touchdowns and he outrushed eventual Heisman Trophy winner O.J. Simpson in a game between the Irish and University of Southern California. After the season he was one of the first players announced for the first North-South All Star Bowl Game in Tampa, Florida in January, 1969. Later that month, the Boston Patriots drafted Gladieux on the 8th round of the NFL draft.

In the first game of the 1970 season, Gladieux was paged over the Harvard Stadium's loudspeakers and placed into the lineup; an upset victory for the Patriots over the Miami Dolphins, 27-14. Shortly before the game, head coach Clive Rush benched safety John Charles and cornerback Larry Carwell because neither had signed their contracts. This created a need for Gladieux who was waived a week earlier to complete the Patriots roster. Gladieux made the tackle on the game's opening kickoff, the first for both the Patriots and Dolphins as members of the new American Football Conference (AFC)

In March 1972, Gladieux was arrested in Fort Lauderdale, Florida and charged with possession of marijuana and public intoxication. He was arrested with a female companion and told a reporter that he didn't know "about the stuff they say they found in the glove compartment.

As a member of the New York Stars in the World Football League Gladieux is named Player of the Week for his performance in the Stars' 43-10 victory over the Houston Texans in Week 7 of the 1974 season. "I'm no great runner, I'm just a winner," said Gladieux who ran for 84 yards and three touchdowns. He would finish the season as the Stars leading rusher.

In the spring of 1980, he along with nearly 500 other players discovered they were part of a settlement between the NFL and NFLPA. Gladieux received $2330 in a pension as a result of him being on an NFL roster between 1972 and 1975. He received this news while completing a round of golf.

In retirement, Gladieux worked as a bartender at Gabby's Pub, a saloon in New Hampshire and returned to his alma mater in 1986 as an assistant on Lou Holtz's staff. Later, he and his wife opened a travel agency that they ran together for 24 years and made a cameo appearance in the 1993 feature film "Rudy." In 2022, Gladieux was recognized in his high school's "Ring of Honor."
