= Larry Conjar =

American football player (born 1945)

No. 35, 25, 31, 48
- Position: Running back

Personal information
- Born: October 28, 1945 (age 81); Harrisburg, Pennsylvania, U.S.
- Listed height: 6 ft 1 in (1.85 m)
- Listed weight: 214 lb (97 kg)

Career information
- High school: Bishop McDevitt (Harrisburg)
- College: Notre Dame
- NFL draft: 1967: 2nd round, 46th overall pick

Career history
- Cleveland Browns (1967); Philadelphia Eagles (1968); Baltimore Colts (1969–1970)

Awards and highlights
- National champion (1966)

Career NFL statistics
- Rushing yards: 102
- Rushing average: 3.4
- Receptions: 6
- Receiving yards: 68
- Stats at Pro Football Reference

Lawrence Wayne Conjar (born October 28, 1945) is an American former professional football player who was a running back for four seasons in the National Football League (NFL) with the Cleveland Browns, Philadelphia Eagles and Baltimore Colts. He was selected by the Browns in the second round of the 1967 NFL/AFL draft after playing college football for the Notre Dame Fighting Irish.

== Early life and college ==
Lawrence Wayne Conjar was born on October 28, 1945, in Harrisburg, Pennsylvania. He attended Bishop McDevitt High School in Harrisburg.

Conjar played college football for the Fighting Irish of the University of Notre Dame. He rushed 137 times for 535 yards and seven touchdowns in 1965 while also catching four passes for 55 yards. In 1966, he recorded 112 carries for 521 yards and seven touchdowns, and four receptions for 62 yards. The 1966 Fighting Irish were consensus national champions.

== Professional career ==
Conjar was selected by the Cleveland Browns in the second round, with the 46th overall pick, of the 1967 NFL draft. He played in 12 games, starting two, during his rookie year in 1967, rushing 20 times for 78 yards while catching six passes for 68 yards. He also appeared in one playoff game that year.

On August 27, 1968, Conjar was traded to the Philadelphia Eagles for an undisclosed 1969 draft pick. He appeared in all 14 games for the Eagles during the 1968 season and recorded eight carries for 21 yards. He was waived on September 1, 1969.

Conjar was claimed off waivers by the Baltimore Colts on September 4, 1969. He played in six games for the Colts that year but only recorded one rushing attempt for no yards. He was waived in early September 1970 but soon signed to the team's taxi squad. Conjar was later promoted to the active roster, appearing in three games (one start) while rushing once for three yards, before being cut that same season.

== Personal life ==
Conjar served in the United States Army.
