= 1966 Big Ten Conference football season =

- Sport: American football
- Number of teams: 10
- Top draft pick: Bubba Smith
- Champion: Michigan State
- Runners-up: Purdue
- Season MVP: Bob Griese

Seasons
- ← 1965 1967 →

1966 Big Ten Conference football standings
	Conf.					Overall
Team	W		L		T	W		L		T
No. 2 Michigan State $	7	–	0	–	0	9	–	0	–	1
No. 7 Purdue	6	–	1	–	0	9	–	2	–	0
Michigan	4	–	3	–	0	6	–	4	–	0
Illinois	4	–	3	–	0	4	–	6	–	0
Minnesota	3	–	3	–	1	4	–	5	–	1
Ohio State	3	–	4	–	0	4	–	5	–	0
Northwestern	2	–	4	–	1	3	–	6	–	1
Wisconsin	2	–	4	–	1	3	–	6	–	1
Indiana	1	–	5	–	1	1	–	8	–	1
Iowa	1	–	6	–	0	2	–	8	–	0
$ – Conference champion; Rankings from AP Poll

The 1966 Big Ten Conference football season was the 71st season of college football played by the member schools of the Big Ten Conference and was a part of the 1966 NCAA University Division football season.

The 1966 Michigan State Spartans football team, under head coach Duffy Daugherty, won the Big Ten football championship, compiled a 9–0–1 record, and was ranked No. 2 in the final AP Poll. Four Spartans' players were among the first eight selections in the 1967 NFL/AFL draft: defensive tackle Bubba Smith (first); running back Clinton Jones (second); linebacker George Webster (fifth); and flanker Gene Washington (eighth).

The 1966 Purdue Boilermakers football team, under head coach Jack Mollenkopf, finished in second place with a 9–2 record and was ranked No. 7 in the final AP Poll. The Boilermakers received the conference's berth to play in the 1967 Rose Bowl because of the Big Ten's "no-repeat" rule and defeated USC, 14–13. Purdue quarterback Bob Griese led the conference in passing yards and total yards and won the Chicago Tribune Silver Football as the Big Ten's most valuable player and the Sammy Baugh Trophy as the nation's top collegiate passer. Griese also finished second behind Steve Spurrier in the voting for the 1966 Heisman Trophy.

== Season overview ==
=== Results and team statistics ===
Conf. Rank	Team	Head coach	AP final	AP high	Overall record	Conf. record	PPG	PAG	MVP
1	Michigan State	Duffy Daugherty	#2	#1	9–0–1	7–0	**29.3**	**9.9**	George Webster
2	Purdue	Jack Mollenkopf	#7	#7	9–2	6–1	27.0	14.0	**Bob Griese**
3 (tie)	Michigan	Bump Elliott	NR	#8	6–4	4–3	23.6	13.8	Jack Clancy
3 (tie)	Illinois	Pete Elliott	NR	NR	4–6	4–3	17.3	19.3	Ron Guenther
5	Minnesota	Murray Warmath	NR	NR	4–5–1	3–3–1	12.4	16.0	Tim Wheeler
6	Ohio State	Woody Hayes	NR	NR	4–5	3–4	12.0	13.7	Ray Pryor
7 (tie)	Northwestern	Alex Agase	NR	NR	3–6–1	2–4–1	13.7	21.3	Roger Murphy
7 (tie)	Wisconsin	Milt Bruhn	NR	NR	3–6–1	2–4–1	8.7	21.2	Bob Richter
9	Indiana	John Pont	NR	NR	1–8–1	1–5–1	10.4	22.9	Frank Stavroff
10	Iowa	Ray Nagel	NR	NR	2–8	1–6	8.6	25.3	Dick Gibbs

Key
AP final = Team's rank in the final AP Poll of the 1966 season
AP high = Team's highest rank in the AP Poll throughout the 1966 season
PPG = Average of points scored per game
PAG = Average of points allowed per game
MVP = Most valuable player as voted by players on each team as part of the voting process to determine the winner of the Chicago Tribune Silver Football trophy; trophy winner in bold

== Statistical leaders ==
The Big Ten's individual statistical leaders for the 1966 season include the following:

=== Passing yards ===
Rank	Name	Team	Yards
1	Bob Griese	Purdue	1,749
2	Dick Vidmer	Michigan	1,609
3	Frank Stavroff	Indiana	1,406
4	William Long	Ohio State	1,180
5	Bill Melzer	Northwestern	1,171

=== Rushing yards ===
Rank	Name	Team	Yards
1	Clinton Jones	Michigan State	784
2	Perry Williams	Purdue	689
3	Mike Krivoshia	Indiana	675
4	Dave Fisher	Michigan	672
5	Curt Wilson	Minnesota	546

=== Receiving yards ===
Rank	Name	Team	Yards
1	Jack Clancy	Michigan	1,077
2	John Wright	Illinois	831
3	Roger Murphy	Northwestern	777
4	Jim Beirne	Purdue	768
5	Tom McCauley	Wisconsin	689

=== Total yards ===
Rank	Name	Team	Yards
1	Bob Griese	Purdue	1,964
2	Dick Vidmer	Michigan	1,639
3	Jimmy Raye	Michigan State	1,596
4	Ed Podolak	Iowa	1,491
5	Frank Stavroff	Indiana	1,328

=== Scoring ===
Rank	Name	Team	Points
1	Jim Detwiler	Michigan	60
2	Perry Williams	Purdue	54
2	Bob Apisa	Michigan State	54
4	Carl Ward	Michigan	48
4	Jim Beirne	Purdue	48

== Awards and honors ==
=== All-Big Ten honors ===
The following players were picked by the Associated Press (AP) and/or the United Press International (UPI) as first-team players on the 1966 All-Big Ten Conference football team.

Offense

Position	Name	Team	Selectors
Quarterback	Bob Griese	Purdue	AP, UPI
Running back	Clinton Jones	Michigan State	AP, UPI [halfback]
Running back	Jim Detwiler	Michigan	AP, UPI [halfback]
Running back	Dave Fisher	Michigan	UPI [fullback]
Running back	Bob Apisa	Michigan State	AP
End	Gene Washington	Michigan State	AP, UPI
End	Jack Clancy	Michigan	AP, UPI
Tackle	Jack Calcaterra	Purdue	AP, UPI
Tackle	Jerry West	Michigan State	AP, UPI
Guard	Chuck Erlenbaugh	Purdue	AP
Guard	Tom Schuette	Indiana	AP
Guard	Donald Bailey	Michigan	UPI
Guard	Anthony Conti	Michigan State	UPI
Center	Ray Pryor	Ohio State	AP, UPI

Defense

Position	Name	Team	Selectors
Defensive end	Bubba Smith	Michigan State	AP, UPI
Defensive end	Ken Kmiec	Illinois	AP
Defensive end	George Olion	Purdue	UPI
Defensive tackle	Lance Olssen	Purdue	AP, UPI
Defensive tackle	Nick Jordan	Michigan State	AP
Defensive tackle	Richard Himes	Ohio State	UPI
Defensive guard	Chuck Kyle	Purdue	UPI
Linebacker	Frank Nunley	Michigan	AP, UPI
Linebacker	Chuck Thornhill	Michigan State	AP, UPI
Linebacker	George Webster	Michigan State	AP [def. back], UPI
Linebacker	Bob Richter	Wisconsin	AP
Defensive back	Bruce Sullivan	Illinois	AP, UPI
Defensive back	Rich Volk	Michigan	AP, UPI
Defensive back	Phil Clark	Northwestern	AP
Defensive back	Jess Philips	Michigan State	UPI [safety]

=== All-American honors ===
At the end of the 1966 season, four Big Ten players secured consensus first-team honors on the 1966 College Football All-America Team. The Big Ten's consensus All-Americans were:

Position	Name	Team	Selectors
Offensive end	Jack Clancy	Michigan	AFCA, AP, CP, FWAA, NEA [split end], UPI, Time, TSN, WCFF
Running back	Clinton Jones	Michigan State	AP, CP, NEA, Time, TSN, WCFF
Defensive end	Bubba Smith	Michigan State	AFCA, AP, CP, FWAA, NEA, UPI, Time, TSN, WCFF
Defensive back	George Webster	Michigan State	AFCA, AP, CP [linebacker], FWAA, NEA [linebacker], UPI, Time, TSN, WCFF

Other Big Ten players who were named first-team All-Americans by at least one selector were:

Position	Name	Team	Selectors
Offensive end	Gene Washington	Michigan State	AFCA, UPI, Time, TSN
Offensive end	Jim Beirne	Purdue	CP
Offensive tackle	Jerry West	Michigan State	NEA
Center	Ray Pryor	Ohio State	FWAA
Quarterback	Bob Griese	Purdue	AFCA [tie]
Defensive back	Rick Volk	Michigan	Time, TSN
Defensive back	John Charles	Purdue	Time, TSN

=== Other awards ===
Purdue quarterback Bob Griese received the Sammy Baugh Trophy as the nation's top collegiate passer. He also finished second in the voting for the Heisman Trophy.

== 1967 NFL/AFL Draft ==
The following Big Ten players were among the first 100 picks in the 1967 NFL/AFL draft:

Name	Position	Team	Round	Overall pick
Bubba Smith	Defensive tackle	Michigan State	1	1
Clinton Jones	Running back	Michigan State	1	2
Bob Griese	Quarterback	Purdue	1	4
George Webster	Linebacker	Michigan State	1	5
Gene Washington	Flanker	Michigan State	1	8
Cas Banaszek	Tight end	Northwestern	1	11
Jim Detwiler	Running back	Michigan	1	20
John Charles	Defensive back	Purdue	1	21
Rick Volk	Defensive back	Michigan	2	45
Mike Current	Tackle	Ohio State	3	58
Frank Nunley	Linebacker	Michigan	3	62
Phil Clark	Defensive back	Northwestern	3	76
John Rowser	Defensive back	Michigan	3	78
Carl Ward	Running back	Michigan	4	83
