= 1966 Michigan Wolverines football team =

American college football season

1966 Michigan Wolverines football
- Conference: Big Ten Conference
- Record: 6–4 (4–3 Big Ten)
- Head coach: Bump Elliott (8th season)
- MVP: Jack Clancy
- Captain: Jack Clancy
- Home stadium: Michigan Stadium

1966 Big Ten Conference football standings
	Conf.					Overall
Team	W		L		T	W		L		T
No. 2 Michigan State $	7	–	0	–	0	9	–	0	–	1
No. 7 Purdue	6	–	1	–	0	9	–	2	–	0
Michigan	4	–	3	–	0	6	–	4	–	0
Illinois	4	–	3	–	0	4	–	6	–	0
Minnesota	3	–	3	–	1	4	–	5	–	1
Ohio State	3	–	4	–	0	4	–	5	–	0
Northwestern	2	–	4	–	1	3	–	6	–	1
Wisconsin	2	–	4	–	1	3	–	6	–	1
Indiana	1	–	5	–	1	1	–	8	–	1
Iowa	1	–	6	–	0	2	–	8	–	0
$ – Conference champion; Rankings from AP Poll

The 1966 Michigan Wolverines football team represented the University of Michigan in the 1966 Big Ten Conference football season. In its eighth year under head coach Bump Elliott, Michigan compiled a 6–4 record (4–3 against conference opponents), tied for third place in the Big Ten, and outscored opponents by a combined total of 236 to 138.

After opening the season with non-conference victories over Oregon State and California, Michigan lost three consecutive games, including losses to No. 1 Michigan State and No. 9 Purdue. The team then won four of its final five games, including a 17–3 victory over rival Ohio State.

Right end Jack Clancy was the team captain and the recipient of the team's most valuable player award. He set a school record and led the Big Ten with 1,077 receiving yards and received both All-American and All-Big Ten honors.

The team's other statistical leaders included quarterback Dick Vidmer with 1,609 passing yards, Dave Fisher with 672 rushing yards, and Jim Detwiler with 60 points scored. Detwiler's 60 points led the Big Ten, and Vidmer's passing yards ranked second behind Bob Griese of Purdue.

== Schedule ==
Date	Opponent	Rank	Site	Result	Attendance	Source
September 17	Oregon State*		Michigan Stadium; Ann Arbor, MI	W 41–0	56,907	
September 24	at California*	No. 9	California Memorial Stadium; Berkeley, CA	W 17–7	41,302	
October 1	North Carolina*	No. 8	Michigan Stadium; Ann Arbor, MI	L 7–21	88,233	
October 8	at No. 1 Michigan State		Spartan Stadium; East Lansing, MI (rivalry)	L 7–20	78,833	
October 15	No. 9 Purdue		Michigan Stadium; Ann Arbor, MI	L 21–22	79,642	
October 22	Minnesota^{†}		Michigan Stadium; Ann Arbor, MI (Little Brown Jug)	W 49–0	71,749	
October 29	at Wisconsin		Camp Randall Stadium; Madison, WI	W 28–17	51,861	
November 5	Illinois		Michigan Stadium; Ann Arbor, MI (rivalry)	L 21–28	59,322	
November 12	Northwestern		Michigan Stadium; Ann Arbor, MI (rivalry)	W 28–20	58,556	
November 19	at Ohio State		Ohio Stadium; Columbus, OH (rivalry)	W 17–3	83,403	
*Non-conference game; ^{†}Homecoming; Rankings from AP Poll released prior to the game; Source:

== Season summary ==
=== Preseason ===
After winning a Big Ten Conference championship in 1964, culminating with a victory over Oregon State in the 1965 Rose Bowl, Michigan compiled a disappointing 4–6 record and tied for seventh place in the Big Ten during the 1965 season.

Starters returning on offense from the 1965 team included halfback Carl Ward, end Jack Clancy, and fullback Dave Fisher. Quarterback Dick Vidmer, who started three games in 1965, returned as the team's starting quarterback in 1966. Jim Detwiler, who missed most of the 1965 season and underwent ACL surgery on his knee, returned to the 1966 squad and became the Big Ten's leading scorer. A key player who did not return from the 1965 offense was offensive tackle Tom Mack who was chosen by the Los Angeles Rams with the second overall pick in the 1966 NFL draft.

On defense, Rich Volk and Mike Bass returned at the cornerback positions, and Frank Nunley returned at linebacker. Key players who did not return from the 1965 squad included All-American defensive tackle Bill Yearby and linebacker Tom Cecchini who became a member of Michigan's coaching staff.

The coaching staff also underwent changes in 1966. In February, Michigan added Don James (inducted into the College Football Hall of Fame in 1997) and George Mans to replace defensive assistants Bob Hollway and Don Dufek Sr. Y. C. McNease was also added as ends and linebackers coach in April, replacing Jack Nelson. William A. Dodd, who played fullback and halfback for Michigan in 1962 and 1963, was hired in June as the freshman football coach, freeing up Dennis Fitzgerald to join the varsity coaching staff.

Michigan's 1966 recruiting class included two players who were later inducted into the College Football Hall of Fame: quarterback (later converted to safety) Tom Curtis and end Jim Mandich. Other members of the 1966 recruiting class were end Phil Seymour, halfback Garvie Craw, linebacker Cecil Pryor, tight end Mike Hankwitz, and quarterback Barry Pierson.

=== Oregon State ===
Week 1: Oregon State at Michigan

Team	1	2	3	4	Total
Oregon State	0	0	0	0	0
• Michigan	14	7	7	13	41

- Date: September 17
- Location: Ann Arbor, MI
- Game attendance: 56,097

On September 17, 1966, Michigan opened its season with a 41–0 victory over Oregon State before a crowd of 56,097 at Michigan Stadium. Jack Clancy set a Michigan record with 10 receptions for 197 yards. Dick Vidmer completed 12 of 18 passes for 258 yards. Michigan tallied 502 yards of offense in the game. The defense held Oregon State to 193 yards of total offense.

=== California ===
Week 2: Michigan at California

Team	1	2	3	4	Total
• Michigan	7	3	7	0	17
California	0	0	0	7	7

- Date: September 24
- Location: Berkeley, CA
- Game attendance: 40,000

On September 24, 1966, Michigan defeated California before a crowd of 40,000 at Memorial Stadium in Berkeley, California. Carl Ward and Dave Fisher scored Michigan's touchdowns, and Rick Sygar kicked a field goal and two extra points. Fisher had 90 rushing yards on 19 carries. Jack Clancy caught eight passes for 93 yards.

=== North Carolina ===
Week 3: North Carolina at Michigan

Team	1	2	3	4	Total
• North Carolina	0	7	7	7	21
Michigan	7	0	0	0	7

- Date: October 1
- Location: Ann Arbor, MI
- Game attendance: 88,233

On October 1, 1966, Michigan (ranked No. 8 in the AP Poll) lost to North Carolina, 21–7, before a crowd of 88,233 at Michigan Stadium. Michigan took a 7–0 lead on a touchdown run by Dave Fisher in the first quarter. Two interceptions thrown by Dick Vidmer and two fumbles by Carl Ward allowed North Carolina back into the game. The Detroit Free Press wrote: "The Wolverines fumbled, bumbled, stumbled, and tumbled out of the ranks of unbeaten college football teams."

=== Michigan State ===
Week 4: Michigan at Michigan State

Team	1	2	3	4	Total
Michigan	0	0	0	7	7
• Michigan State	7	0	0	13	20

- Date: October 8
- Location: East Lansing, MI
- Game attendance: 78,833

On October 8, 1966, Michigan lost to Michigan State, 20–7, before a crowd of 78,833 at Spartan Stadium in East Lansing, Michigan. Michigan State came into the game ranked No. 1 and favored by 14 points and led, 7–0, as the fourth quarter began. Michigan was held to 47 rushing yards. Michigan quarterback Dick Vidmer threw a school record 47 passes, completing 18 for 168 yards, including a 15-yard touchdown pass to Jim Detwiler in the fourth quarter. Michigan's offense was hampered by the strong rushing of Spartan defender Bubba Smith.

=== Purdue ===
Week 5: Purdue at Michigan

Team	1	2	3	4	Total
• Purdue	7	7	2	6	22
Michigan	0	14	7	0	21

- Date: October 15
- Location: Ann Arbor, MI
- Game attendance: 79,642

On October 15, 1966, Michigan lost to Purdue, 22–21, before a crowd of 79,642 at Michigan Stadium. A safety, a blocked punt, and two lost fumbles contributed to Michigan's third consecutive loss. Michigan led, 21–14, when Rick Sygar fielded a punt at the goal line and was tackled for a safety. Purdue next blocked a Michigan punt from the Michigan eight-yard line and recovered the loose ball for a touchdown. Dick Vidmer completed 13 of 18 passes for 208 yards, while the Michigan defense held Bob Griese to 63 yards and intercepted two of his passes. Michigan's Dave Fisher rushed for 120 yards on 20 carries.

=== Minnesota ===
Week 6: Minnesota at Michigan

Team	1	2	3	4	Total
Minnesota	0	0	0	0	0
• Michigan	14	21	7	7	49

- Date: October 22
- Location: Ann Arbor, MI
- Game attendance: 71,749

On October 22, 1966, Michigan defeated Minnesota, 49–0, before a homecoming crowd of 71,749 at Michigan Stadium. The margin of victory was the largest in the history of the Little Brown Jug rivalry to that point. The victory broke a three-game losing streak for the Wolverines. Jack Clancy caught 10 passes for 168 yards and two touchdowns. Jim Detwiler had 16 carries for 60 yards and two touchdowns. Dick Vidmer completed 15 of 19 passes for 212 yards. Rick Sygar returned a punt 57 yards for a touchdown and kicked seven extra points.

=== Wisconsin ===
Week 7: Michigan at Wisconsin

Team	1	2	3	4	Total
• Michigan	3	7	7	0	17
Wisconsin	0	3	0	0	3

- Date: October 29
- Location: Madison, WI
- Game attendance: 52,881

On October 29, 1966, Michigan defeated Wisconsin, 28–17, before a crowd of 52,881 at Camp Randall Stadium in Madison, Wisconsin. Michigan's fullback Dave Fisher was the leading rusher in the Big Ten Conference prior to the game and totaled 99 yards and scored a touchdown in the first half, but he suffered a shoulder injury in the second quarter. Jim Detwiler added two touchdowns for Michigan, and Carl Ward also scored a touchdown. Michigan totaled 232 rushing yards and 71 passing yards, while Wisconsin totaled 127 rushing yards and 185 passing yards.

=== Illinois ===
Week 8: Illinois at Michigan

Team	1	2	3	4	Total
Illinois	7	10	3	0	20
• Michigan	7	7	7	7	28

- Date: November 5
- Location: Ann Arbor, MI
- Game attendance: 59,322

On November 5, 1966, Michigan lost to Illinois, 28–21, before a crowd of 59,322 in a snow storm at Michigan Stadium. The outcome was the only Illinois victory in the seven-year rivalry between head coaching brothers Bump Elliott and Pete Elliott. Michigan led, 21–14, at the start of the fourth quarter. Illinois narrowed Michigan's lead on a 60-yard punt return for touchdown by Mick Smith. The extra point was missed, and Michigan led, 21–20. Later in the fourth quarter, Michigan had the ball at Illinois' six-yard line and appeared to be driving for a clinching touchdown. Illinois safety Bruce Sullivan intercepted Dick Vidmer's pass at the two-yard line and returned the ball 98 yards for a touchdown. Illinois successfully passed for a two-point conversion.

=== Northwestern ===
Week 9: Northwestern at Michigan

Team	1	2	3	4	Total
Northwestern	7	10	3	0	20
• Michigan	7	7	7	7	28

- Date: November 12
- Location: Ann Arbor, MI
- Game attendance: 58,556

On November 12, 1966, Michigan defeated Northwestern, 28–20, before a crowd of 58,556 at Michigan Stadium. Dick Vidmer passed for 170 yards, including touchdown passes of 49 yards to Jim Detwiler and 33 yards to Jack Clancy. Vidmer also scored on a one-yard run, and Carl Ward also scored on a five-yard run. The Detroit Free Press wrote: "There were so many fundamental mistakes, it looked like romper room football. The same mistakes that have plagued Michigan all season threatened an upset in this home finale. Fumbles, dropped passes, missed tackles, bad passes from center on punts and botched-up punt returns."

=== Ohio State ===
Week 10: Michigan at Ohio State

Team	1	2	3	4	Total
• Michigan	3	7	7	0	17
Ohio State	0	3	0	0	3

- Date: November 19
- Location: Columbus, OH
- Game attendance: 83,403
- Game weather: Cloudy; 36 °F (2 °C)

Scoring summary
1	2:57	MICH	Dick Sygar 24-yard field goal	MICH 3–0
2	3:50	OSU	Cairns 26-yard field goal	Tie 3–3
2	1:11	MICH	Jim Detwiler 7-yard run (Sygar kick)	MICH 10–3
3	9:04	MICH	Clayton Wilhite 28-yard pass from Dick Vidmer (Sygar kick)	MICH 17–3

On November 19, 1966, Michigan defeated Ohio State, 17–3, before a crowd of 83,403 at Ohio Stadium in Columbus, Ohio. Michigan totaled 382 yards of offense, including 272 rushing yards. Jim Detwiler rushed for 140 yards on 20 carries, including a seven-yard touchdown run in the second quarter. Michigan also scored on a 28-yard touchdown pass from Dick Vidmer to Clayton Wilhite in the third quarter. Vidmer passed for 110 yards to give him Michigan's career and season passing records. Jack Clancy had three receptions for 59 yards to conclude the season with a Big Ten record 1,079 receiving yards. Bo Rein had 82 rushing yards and 59 receiving yards for Ohio State. The loss gave Woody Hayes his second losing record in 16 seasons at Ohio State. This was Michigan's last victory over Ohio State at Ohio Stadium while unranked until 2024.

=== Postseason ===
With a 4–3 conference record (6–4 overall), Michigan tied with Illinois for third place in the Big Ten Conference. Michigan outscored all opponents by a combined total of 236 to 138. Undefeated Michigan State won the conference championship and was ranked No. 2 in the final AP Poll.

At Michigan's annual football bust held on November 21, 1966, center Joe Dayton was selected to serve as the captain of the 1967 Michigan Wolverines football team.

Michigan end Jack Clancy set new Big Ten records with 76 receptions and 1,077 receiving yards. He won numerous postseason awards, including the following:

- He was a consensus All-American, receiving first-team honors from the Associated Press, United Press International, American Football Coaches Association, Football Writers Association of America, Newspaper Enterprise Association, Central Press Association, Football News, Time, The Sporting News, and Walter Camp Football Foundation.
- He was selected by both the Associated Press (AP, writers) and United Press International (UPI, coaches) as a first-team end on the 1966 All-Big Ten Conference football team.
- He was selected as the most valuable player on the 1966 Michigan team.
- Clancy finished third behind Bob Griese and George Webster in voting for the Chicago Tribune Silver Football as the Big Ten's most valuable player.

Defensive back Rick Volk also received multiple postseason awards, including first-team All-American honors from Time and The Sporting News, and first-team All-Big Ten honors from the AP and UPI.

Other Michigan players receiving All-Big Ten honors in 1966 were: Jim Detwiler (AP-1, UPI-1); Frank Nunley (AP-1, UPI-1); Dave Fisher (AP-2, UPI-1); Don Bailey (UPI-1); Carl Ward (AP-2, UPI-2); Henry Hanna (AP-2); James Hribal (AP-2); and John Rowser (UPI-2).

Six Michigan players were selected to play in postseason all-star games: Jack Clancy, Rick Volk, and Dave Fisher in the East–West Shrine Game; Carl Ward and Don Bailey in the North–South Shrine Game; and Frank Nunley in the Senior Bowl and Blue–Gray Football Classic.

Team awards were presented as follows:

- Most Valuable Player: Jack Clancy
- Meyer Morton Award: Don Bailey
- John Maulbetsch Award: Tom Stincic
- Arthur Robinsion Scholarship Award: Clayton Wilhite

== Personnel ==
=== Letter winners ===
The following players received varsity letters for their participation on the 1966 football team.

==== Offense ====
- Donald Bailey, 6'0", 225 pounds, senior, Greensburg, Pennsylvania - started 6 games at right guard
- Mike Bass, 6'0", 180 pounds, senior, Ypsilanti, Michigan - started 4 games at right halfback, 2 games at left halfback
- John Buzynski 6'4", 230 pounds, senior, Harper Woods, Michigan - center
- Jack Clancy, 6'1", 192 pounds, senior, Detroit Michigan - started 6 games at right end
- Jerome Danhof, 6'3", 228 pounds, senior, Detroit, Michigan - center
- Joseph Dayton, 6'2", 229 pounds, junior, Detroit, Michigan - started 8 games at center
- Paul D'Eramo, 5'10", 208 pounds, junior, Youngstown, Ohio - started 1 game at left guard
- Jim Detwiler, 6'3", 215 pounds, senior, Toledo, Ohio - started 1 game at left halfback
- Dave Fisher, 5'10", 210 pounds, senior, Kettering, Ohio - started 7 games at fullback
- Henry Hanna, 6'0", 220 pounds, senior, Youngstown, Ohio - started 7 games at left guard
- William Hardy, 6'1", 229 pounds, senior, Detroit - started 1 game at left offensive tackle, 1 game at right guard, 3 games at right defensive tackle
- James Hribal, 6'0", 220 pounds, senior, Dearborn, Michigan - started 5 games at right tackle
- Derrick Humphries, 6'2", 190 pounds, junior, Detroit - end
- Ron Johnson, 6'1", 192 pounds, sophomore, Detroit - halfback
- Stanley Kemp, 6'1", 185 pounds, senior, Greenville, Michigan - end
- Jon Kramer 6'3", 213 pounds, sophomore, Toledo, Ohio - started 4 games at left offensive end, 1 game at right offensive end
- Thomas Landsittel, 5'10", 198 pounds, senior, Delaware, Ohio - offensive guard
- Peter Mair, 6'4", 233 pounds, senior, Allentown, Pennsylvania - offensive tackle
- Jerry Miklos, 6'3", 225 pounds, sophomore, Chicago - started 1 game at center, 1 game at left tackle, 1 game at right tackle
- Ray Phillips, 6'3", 228 pounds, junior, Evanston, Illinois - started 5 games at left tackle
- John Reynolds, 5'10", 218 pounds, sophomore, Grosse Pointe Woods, Michigan - fullback
- Ernie Sharpe, 5'11", 191 pounds, junior, Palos Heights, Illinois - started 5 games at left halfback
- Warren Sipp, 6'1", 216 pounds, sophomore, Akron, Ohio - started 3 games at left end
- Dick Vidmer, 6'1", 185 pounds, junior, Greensburg, Pennsylvania - started 9 games at quarterback
- Carl Ward, 5'11", 178 pounds, senior, Cincinnati - started 3 games at right halfback
- Clayton Wilhite, 6'4", 210 pounds, senior, Bay City, Michigan - started 1 game at left end
- Ken Wright, 6'1", 230 pounds, senior, Bay City, Michigan - started 1 game at left tackle

==== Defense ====
- Mike Bass, 6'0", 180 pounds, senior, Ypsilanti, Michigan - started 10 games at cornerback
- Charles Barry Dehlin, 5'11", 205 pounds, senior, Flushing, Michigan - started 3 games at linebacker, 1 game at left offensive guard
- Tom Goss, 6'2", 225 pounds, junior, Knoxville, Tennessee - started 3 games at middle guard
- Gerald Hartman, 6'1", 168 pounds, sophomore, Ann Arbor, Michigan - defensive back
- Jon Kramer, 6'3", 213 pounds, sophomore, Toledo, Ohio - started 6 games at left defensive end
- Louis Lee, 6'2", 195 pounds, senior, Willow Grove, Pennsylvania - defensive back
- Bob Mielke, 6'1", 223 pounds, senior, Chicago - started 7 games at middle guard, 3 games at left defensive tackle, 1 game at left offensive guard, 1 game at left offensive tackle
- Dennis Morgan, 5'11", 230 pounds, junior, Phoenixville, Pennsylvania - started 7 games at linebacker
- Frank Nunley, 6'2", 218 pounds, senior, Belleville, Michigan - started 10 games at linebacker, 2 games at right offensive guard, 1 game at right offensive tackle
- Dave Porter, 6'3", 237 pounds, junior, Lansing, Michigan - started 7 games at right defensive tackle, 3 games at right offensive tackle, 1 game at center
- Rocky Rosema, 6'2", 214 pounds, junior, Grand Rapids, Michigan - started 4 games at left defensive end
- John Rowser, 6'O", 183 pounds, senior, Detroit - started 10 games at cornerback, 3 games at left halfback
- Tom Stincic, 6'3", 217 pounds, sophomore, Cleveland - started 10 games at right defensive end, 3 games at right offensive end, 1 game at right offensive guard
- Dick Sygar, 5'11", 185 pounds, senior, Niles, Ohio - started 10 games at safety, 2 games at right halfback, 1 game at fullback
- Rick Volk, 6'3", 192 pounds, senior, Wauseon, Ohio - started 10 games at safety, 2 games at fullback, 1 game at quarterback
- Robert Wedge, 6'2", 193 pounds, sophomore, Port Huron, Michigan - defensive back
- Dick Williamson, 6'4", 225 pounds, junior, East Detroit, Michigan - started 7 games at left defensive tackle, 1 game at left offensive tackle

=== Coaching staff ===
Michigan's 1966 coaching, training, and support staff included the following persons.

- Head coach: Bump Elliott
- Assistant coaches: William Dodd (freshman), Dennis Fitzgerald, Henry Fonde (backfield), Don James (defensive backfield), George Mans, Tony Mason (offensive line), Y. C. McNease (defensive line)
- Trainer: Jim Hunt
- Manager: David Muir

== Statistical leaders ==
Michigan's individual statistical leaders for the 1966 season include those listed below.

=== Rushing ===
Player	Attempts	Net yards	Yards per attempt	Touchdowns
Dave Fisher	131	672	5.1	2
Carl Ward	128	519	4.0	2
Jim Detwiler	86	411	4.8	4

=== Passing ===
Player	Attempts	Completions	Interceptions	Comp %	Yards	Yds/Comp	TD
Dick Vidmer	225	117	7	52.0	1609	13.8	10

=== Receiving ===
Player	Receptions	Yards	Yds/Recp	TD
Jack Clancy	76	1077	14.2	4
Jim Detwiler	9	165	18.3	3
Carl Ward	10	146	14.6	2

=== Kickoff returns ===
Player	Returns	Yards	Yds/Return	TD	Long
Jim Detwiler	8	183	22.9	0	19
Carl Ward	5	109	21.8	0	40
Ernie Sharpe	3	45	15.0	0	17

=== Punt returns ===
Player	Returns	Yards	Yds/Return	TD	Long
Rick Volk	12	131	10.9	0	10
Dick Sygar	7	102	14.6	1	13
