= 1966 Illinois Fighting Illini football team =

American college football season

1966 Illinois Fighting Illini football
- Conference: Big Ten Conference
- Record: 4–6 (4–3 Big Ten)
- Head coach: Pete Elliott (7th season)
- MVP: Ron Guenther
- Captains: Bo Batchelder; Kai Anderson
- Home stadium: Memorial Stadium

1966 Big Ten Conference football standings
	Conf.					Overall
Team	W		L		T	W		L		T
No. 2 Michigan State $	7	–	0	–	0	9	–	0	–	1
No. 7 Purdue	6	–	1	–	0	9	–	2	–	0
Michigan	4	–	3	–	0	6	–	4	–	0
Illinois	4	–	3	–	0	4	–	6	–	0
Minnesota	3	–	3	–	1	4	–	5	–	1
Ohio State	3	–	4	–	0	4	–	5	–	0
Northwestern	2	–	4	–	1	3	–	6	–	1
Wisconsin	2	–	4	–	1	3	–	6	–	1
Indiana	1	–	5	–	1	1	–	8	–	1
Iowa	1	–	6	–	0	2	–	8	–	0
$ – Conference champion; Rankings from AP Poll

The 1966 Illinois Fighting Illini football team was an American football team that represented the University of Illinois as a member of the Big Ten Conference during the 1966 Big Ten season. In their seventh year under head coach Pete Elliott, the Fighting Illini compiled a 4–6 record (4–3 in conference games), tied for third place in the Big Ten, and were outscored by a total of 193 to 173.

The team's statistical leaders included quarterback Bob Naponic (998 passing yards, 43.2% completion percentage), running back Bill Huston (420 rushing yards, 4.7 yards per carry), and wide receiver John Wright (60 receptions for 831 yards). Guard Ron Guenther was selected as the team's most valuable player. Defensive end Ken Kmiec and defensive back Bruce Sullivan received first-team honors on the 1966 All-Big Ten Conference football team.

The team played its home games at Memorial Stadium in Champaign, Illinois.

== Schedule ==
Date	Opponent	Site	Result	Attendance	Source
September 17	at SMU*	Cotton Bowl; Dallas, TX	L 7–26	28,000	
September 24	Missouri*	Memorial Stadium; Champaign, IL (rivalry)	L 14–21	55,378	
October 1	No. 1 Michigan State	Memorial Stadium; Champaign, IL	L 10–26	57,747	
October 8	Ohio State	Memorial Stadium; Champaign, IL (Illibuck)	W 10–9	51,069	
October 15	at Indiana	Seventeenth Street Stadium; Bloomington, IN (rivalry)	W 24–10	39,339	
October 22	Stanford*	Memorial Stadium; Champaign, IL	L 3–6	56,561	
October 29	at Purdue	Ross–Ade Stadium; West Lafayette, IN (rivalry)	L 21–25	61,643	
November 5	at Michigan	Michigan Stadium; Ann Arbor, MI (rivalry)	W 28–21	59,322	
November 12	Wisconsin	Memorial Stadium; Champaign, IL	W 49–14	53,645	
November 19	at Northwestern	Dyche Stadium; Evanston, IL (rivalry)	L 7–35	37,625	
*Non-conference game; Rankings from AP Poll released prior to the game; Source:
