= 1966 Ohio State Buckeyes football team =

American college football season

1966 Ohio State Buckeyes football
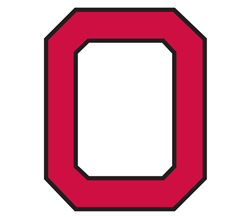
- Conference: Big Ten Conference
- Record: 4–5 (3–4 Big Ten)
- Head coach: Woody Hayes (16th season)
- MVP: Ray Pryor
- Captains: Mike Current; John Fill; Ray Pryor
- Home stadium: Ohio Stadium

1966 Big Ten Conference football standings
	Conf.					Overall
Team	W		L		T	W		L		T
No. 2 Michigan State $	7	–	0	–	0	9	–	0	–	1
No. 7 Purdue	6	–	1	–	0	9	–	2	–	0
Michigan	4	–	3	–	0	6	–	4	–	0
Illinois	4	–	3	–	0	4	–	6	–	0
Minnesota	3	–	3	–	1	4	–	5	–	1
Ohio State	3	–	4	–	0	4	–	5	–	0
Northwestern	2	–	4	–	1	3	–	6	–	1
Wisconsin	2	–	4	–	1	3	–	6	–	1
Indiana	1	–	5	–	1	1	–	8	–	1
Iowa	1	–	6	–	0	2	–	8	–	0
$ – Conference champion; Rankings from AP Poll

The 1966 Ohio State Buckeyes football team represented the Ohio State University as a member of the Big Ten Conference during the 1966 Big Ten season. In their 16th year under head coach Woody Hayes, the Buckeyes compiled a 4–5 record (3–4 in conference games), finished in sixth place in the Big Ten, and were outscored by a total of 123 to 108.

The team's statistical leaders included quarterback William Long (1,180 passing yards, 55.2% completion percentage), halfback Bo Rein (446 rushing yards, 4.4 yards per carry), and wide receiver Billy Anders (55 receptions for 671 yards). Two Ohio State players received first-team honors on the 1966 All-Big Ten Conference football team: center Ray Pryor (AP-1, UPI-1); and defensive tackle Dick Himes (UPI-1).

The team played its home games at Ohio Stadium in Columbus, Ohio.

== Schedule ==
Date	Time	Opponent	Site	Result	Attendance	Source
September 24	1:30 p.m.	TCU*	Ohio Stadium; Columbus, OH	W 14–7	75,375	
October 1	1:30 p.m.	Washington*	Ohio Stadium; Columbus, OH	L 22–38	80,241	
October 8	1:30 p.m.	at Illinois	Memorial Stadium; Champaign, IL (Illibuck)	L 9–10	51,069	
October 15	1:30 p.m.	No. 1 Michigan State	Ohio Stadium; Columbus, OH	L 8–11	84,282	
October 22	1:30 p.m.	Wisconsin	Ohio Stadium; Columbus, OH	W 24–13	84,265	
October 29	2:30 p.m.	at Minnesota	Memorial Stadium; Minneapolis, MN	L 7–17	49,489	
November 5	1:30 p.m.	Indiana	Ohio Stadium; Columbus, OH	W 7–0	80,834	
November 12	2:30 p.m.	at Iowa	Iowa Stadium; Iowa City, IA	W 14–10	44,677	
November 19	1:30 p.m.	Michigan	Ohio Stadium; Columbus, OH (rivalry)	L 3–17	83,403	
*Non-conference game; Rankings from AP Poll released prior to the game; All times are in Eastern time; Source:

== Game summaries ==
=== TCU ===
Team	1	2	3	4	Total
TCU	0	0	7	0	7
• Ohio St	7	0	0	7	14

- Date: September 24
- Location: Ohio Stadium, Columbus, Ohio
- Game attendance: 75,375
- Game weather: Sunny; 66 °F (19 °C); wind 8-10 mph W

Scoring summary
Q1	10:10	OHST	Hudson 2 yard run (Cairns kick)	OHST 7–0
Q3	8:41	TCU	Shabay 2 yard run (Alford kick)	Tie 7–7
Q4	12:31	OHST	Hudson 18 yard run (Cairns kick)	OHST 14–7

=== Washington ===
Team	1	2	3	4	Total
• Washington	7	14	7	10	38
Ohio State	0	7	8	7	22

- Date: October 1
- Location: Ohio Stadium
- Game attendance: 80,241
- Game weather: Rainy, wind NW 10 mph, 59 °F (15 °C)

Scoring summary
Q1	11:26	WASH	Jordan 3 yard run (Martin kick)	WASH 0–7
Q2	11:08	WASH	Jordan 1 yard run (Martin kick)	WASH 0–14
Q2	4:27	WASH	Jordan 4 yard run (Martin kick)	WASH 0–21
Q2	0:12	OSU	Long 1 yard run (Cairns kick)	WASH 7–21
Q3	12:43	WASH	Moore 2 yard run (Martin kick)	WASH 7–28
Q3	3:40	OSU	Long 3 yard pass to Fontes (Long pass to Anders)	WASH 15–28
Q4	9:03	WASH	Martin 23 yard field goal	WASH 15–31
Q4	5:22	OSU	Long 3 yard pass to Anders (Cairns kick)	WASH 22–31
Q4	4:27	WASH	Moore 47 yard run (Martin kick)	WASH 22–38

=== Illinois ===
Team	1	2	3	4	Total
Ohio State	3	3	3	0	9
• Illinois	0	3	0	7	10

- Date: October 8
- Location: Memorial Stadium, Champaign, Illinois
- Game attendance: 51,069
- Game weather: Partly cloudy, wind SSW 18-20 mph, 65 °F (18 °C)

Scoring summary
Q1	4:48	OSU	Cairns 22 yard field goal	OSU 0–3
Q2	7:39	OSU	Cairns 55 yard field goal	OSU 0–6
Q2	0:34	ILL	Stotz 29 yard field goal	OSU 3–6
Q3	6:25	OSU	Cairns 28 yard field goal	OSU 3–9
Q4	6:26	ILL	Naponic run (Stotz kick)	ILL 10–9

=== Michigan State ===
Team	1	2	3	4	Total
• Michigan State	0	0	3	8	11
Ohio State	2	0	0	6	8

- Date: October 15
- Location: Ohio Stadium
- Game attendance: 84,282
- Game weather: Rain, wind SE 20-35, 69 °F (21 °C)

Scoring summary
Q1	8:09	OSU	Safety, center pass through end zone	OSU 2–0
Q3	6:02	MSU	Kenny 27 yard field goal	MSU 2–3
Q4	14:53	OSU	Long 47 yard pass to Anders (kick failed)	OSU 8–3
Q4	7:09	MSU	Apisa 1 yard run (Kenney pass to Wedemeyer)	MSU 8–11

=== Wisconsin ===
Team	1	2	3	4	Total
Wisconsin	0	6	7	0	13
• Ohio St	7	0	3	14	24

- Date: October 22
- Location: Ohio Stadium, Columbus, Ohio
- Game attendance: 84,265
- Game weather: Clear; 65 °F (18 °C); wind 25 mph SW

Scoring summary
Q1	1:55	OHST	Hudson 2 yard run (Cairns kick)	OHST 7–0
Q2	11:54	WIS	Schinke 40 yard field goal	OHST 7–3
Q2	:22	WIS	Schinke 47 yard field goal	OHST 7–6
Q3	7:11	OHST	Cairns 27 yard field goal	OHST 10–6
Q3	3:06	WIS	Jankowski 5 yard pass from Boyajian (Schinke kick)	WIS 13–10
Q4	4:19	OHST	Hudson 7 yard run (Cairns kick)	OHST 17–13
Q4	:38	OHST	Hudson 8 yard run (Cairns kick)	OHST 24–13

=== Minnesota ===
Team	1	2	3	4	Total
Ohio State	0	0	0	7	7
• Minnesota	0	7	7	3	17

- Date: October 29
- Location: Memorial Stadium, Champaign, Illinois
- Game attendance: 49,489
- Game weather: Overcast, 37 °F (3 °C)

Scoring summary
Q2	7:58	MINN	Fumble recovery in end zone by Wintermute (Bevan kick)	MINN 7–0
Q3	11:45	MINN	Wilson 3 yard run (Bevan kick)	MINN 14–0
Q4	11:59	OSU	Long 10 yard pass to Rein (Cairns kick)	MINN 14–7
Q4	7:01	MINN	Bevans 21 yard field goal	MINN 17–7

=== Indiana ===
Team	1	2	3	4	Total
Indiana	0	0	0	0	0
• Ohio St	0	0	7	0	7

- Date: November 5
- Location: Ohio Stadium, Columbus, Ohio
- Game attendance: 80,834
- Game weather: Rain; 40 °F (4 °C); wind 15 mph S

Scoring summary
Q3	9:39	OHST	Hubbard 9 yard pass from Long (Cairns kick)	OHST 7–0

=== Iowa ===
Team	1	2	3	4	Total
• Ohio St	0	7	0	7	14
Iowa	0	3	0	7	10

- Date: November 12
- Location: Kinnick Stadium, Iowa City, Iowa
- Game attendance: 44,677
- Game weather: Sunny; 38 °F (3 °C); wind 8 mph SE

Scoring summary
Q2	10:42	IOWA	Anderson 42 yard field goal	IOWA 3–0
Q2	5:02	OHST	Hudson 4 yard run (Cairns kick)	OHST 7–3
Q4	13:51	IOWA	Crees 12 yard pass from Podolak (Anderson kick)	IOWA 10–7
Q4	5:20	OHST	Rein 2 yard pass from Long (Cairns kick)	OHST 14–10

=== Michigan ===
Team	1	2	3	4	Total
• Michigan	3	7	7	0	17
Ohio St	0	3	0	0	3

- Date: November 19
- Location: Ohio Stadium, Columbus, Ohio
- Game attendance: 83,403
- Game weather: Cloudy; 36 °F (2 °C)

Scoring summary
Q1	2:57	MICH	Sygar 24 yard field goal	MICH 3–0
Q2	3:50	OHST	Cairns 26 yard field goal	Tie 3–3
Q2	1:11	MICH	Detwiler 7 yard run (Sygar kick)	MICH 10–3
Q3	9:04	MICH	Wilhite 28 yard pass from Vidmer (Sygar kick)	MICH 17–3

== Coaching staff ==
- Woody Hayes – Head coach – 16th year

== 1967 NFL draftees ==
Player	Round	Pick	Position	NFL club
Mike Current	3	58	Tackle	Denver Broncos
Bo Rein	7	179	Flanker	Baltimore Colts
Ron Sepic	12	300	End	Washington Redskins
