= 1966 Iowa Hawkeyes football team =

American college football season

1966 Iowa Hawkeyes football
- Conference: Big Ten Conference
- Record: 2–8 (1–6 Big Ten)
- Head coach: Ray Nagel (1st season)
- MVP: Dick Gibbs
- Captains: Dick Gibbs; Dan Hilsabeck
- Home stadium: Iowa Stadium

1966 Big Ten Conference football standings
	Conf.					Overall
Team	W		L		T	W		L		T
No. 2 Michigan State $	7	–	0	–	0	9	–	0	–	1
No. 7 Purdue	6	–	1	–	0	9	–	2	–	0
Michigan	4	–	3	–	0	6	–	4	–	0
Illinois	4	–	3	–	0	4	–	6	–	0
Minnesota	3	–	3	–	1	4	–	5	–	1
Ohio State	3	–	4	–	0	4	–	5	–	0
Northwestern	2	–	4	–	1	3	–	6	–	1
Wisconsin	2	–	4	–	1	3	–	6	–	1
Indiana	1	–	5	–	1	1	–	8	–	1
Iowa	1	–	6	–	0	2	–	8	–	0
$ – Conference champion; Rankings from AP Poll

The 1966 Iowa Hawkeyes football team was an American football team that represented the University of Iowa as a member of the Big Ten Conference during the 1966 Big Ten football season. In their first year under head coach Ray Nagel, the Hawkeyes compiled a 2–8 record (1–6 in conference game), finished the season in last place in the Big Ten, and were outscored by a total of 253 to 86.

The 1966 Hawkeyes gained 1,385 rushing yards and 1,210 passing yards. On defense, they gave up 1,990 rushing yards and 1,603 passing yards.

The team's statistical leaders included quarterback Ed Podolak (77-of-191 passing, 1,041 yards; 1,491 yards of total offense), Silas McKinnie (516 rushing yards), Al Bream (30 receptions for 418 yards), and kicker Bob Anderson (24 points). Key players on defense included defensive back Dick Gibbs and linebackers Dan Hilsabeck and Dave Moreland. Gibbs and Hilsabeck were the team captains. Gibbs was selected as the team's most valuable player.

The team played its home games at Iowa Stadium in Iowa City, Iowa. Home attendance totaled 278,628, an average of 46,438 per game.

== Schedule ==
Date	Opponent	Site	Result	Attendance	Source
September 17	Arizona*	Iowa Stadium; Iowa City, IA	W 31–20	45,000	
September 24	Oregon State*	Iowa Stadium; Iowa City, IA	L 3–17	43,276	
October 1	Wisconsin	Iowa Stadium; Iowa City, IA (rivalry)	L 0–7	52,787	
October 8	at Purdue	Ross–Ade Stadium; West Lafayette, IN	L 0–35	52,715	
October 15	at Minnesota	Memorial Stadium; Minneapolis, MN (rivalry)	L 0–17	62,631	
October 22	Northwestern^{†}	Iowa Stadium; Iowa City, IA	L 15–24	54,613	
October 29	Indiana	Iowa Stadium; Iowa City, IA	W 20–19	38,952	
November 5	at No. 2 Michigan State	Spartan Stadium; East Lansing, MI	L 7–56	68,711	
November 12	Ohio State	Iowa Stadium; Iowa City, IA	L 10–14	44,677	
November 18	at Miami (FL)*	Miami Orange Bowl; Miami, FL	L 0–44	35,003	
*Non-conference game; ^{†}Homecoming; Rankings from AP Poll released prior to the game; Source:
