= Richard Gibbs (disambiguation) =

Richard Gibbs (born 1955) is an American film composer and music producer.

Richard Gibbs may also refer to:

- Richard Gibbs, 2nd Baron Wraxall (1928–2001), British peer
- Richard Gibbs (judge) (born 1941), British judge
- Richard Gibbs (diplomat), United States Ambassador to Peru, 1875–1879, and to Bolivia, 1883–1885
- Richard Gibbs (biologist), Australian geneticist
- Richard Gibbs (Canadian football) (born c. 1945), Canadian and American football player
- Dick Gibbs (1892–1916), Australian rules footballer
- Dick Gibbs (basketball) (born 1948), American basketball player
