= 1966 Wisconsin Badgers football team =

American college football season

1966 Wisconsin Badgers football
- Conference: Big Ten Conference
- Record: 3–6–1 (2–4–1 Big Ten)
- Head coach: Milt Bruhn (11th season)
- MVP: Bob Richter
- Captains: Tony Loukas; Bob Richter
- Home stadium: Camp Randall Stadium

1966 Big Ten Conference football standings
	Conf.					Overall
Team	W		L		T	W		L		T
No. 2 Michigan State $	7	–	0	–	0	9	–	0	–	1
No. 7 Purdue	6	–	1	–	0	9	–	2	–	0
Michigan	4	–	3	–	0	6	–	4	–	0
Illinois	4	–	3	–	0	4	–	6	–	0
Minnesota	3	–	3	–	1	4	–	5	–	1
Ohio State	3	–	4	–	0	4	–	5	–	0
Northwestern	2	–	4	–	1	3	–	6	–	1
Wisconsin	2	–	4	–	1	3	–	6	–	1
Indiana	1	–	5	–	1	1	–	8	–	1
Iowa	1	–	6	–	0	2	–	8	–	0
$ – Conference champion; Rankings from AP Poll

The 1966 Wisconsin Badgers football team was an American football team that represented the University of Wisconsin as a member of the Big Ten Conference during the 1966 Big Ten season. In their 11th and final year under head coach Milt Bruhn, the Badgers compiled a 3–6–1 record (2–4–1 in conference games), tied for seventh place in the Big Ten, and were outscored by a total of 212 to 87.

The Badgers gained an average of 136.6 passing yards and 105.5 rushing yards per game. On defense, they gave up an average of 119.9 passing yards and 178.7 rushing yards per game. The team's individual statistical leaders included: quarterback John Boyajian (863 passing yards); running back Wayne Todd (480 rushing yards); and wide receiver Tom McCauley (46 receptions for 689 yards).

Linebacker Bob Richter was selected as the team's most valuable player. Richter and Tony Loukas were the team captains. Two Wisconsin players received first- or second-team honors on the 1966 All-Big Ten Conference football team: Richter at linebacker (AP-1, UPI-2); and Tom Schinke at defensive back (AP-2).

The Badgers played their home games at Camp Randall Stadium in Madison, Wisconsin.

== Schedule ==
Date	Opponent	Site	Result	Attendance	Source
September 17	Iowa State*	Camp Randall Stadium; Madison, WI	W 20–10	51,051	
September 24	at No. 5 USC*	Los Angeles Memorial Coliseum; Los Angeles, CA	L 3–38	52,325	
October 1	at Iowa	Iowa Stadium; Iowa City, IA (rivalry)	W 7–0	52,787	
October 8	No. 7 Nebraska*	Camp Randall Stadium; Madison, WI (rivalry)	L 3–31	52,428	
October 15	Northwestern	Camp Randall Stadium; Madison, WI	T 3–3	53,163	
October 22	at Ohio State	Ohio Stadium; Columbus, OH	L 13–24	84,265	
October 29	Michigan	Camp Randall Stadium; Madison, WI	L 17–28	51,816	
November 5	Purdue^{†}	Camp Randall Stadium; Madison, WI	L 0–23	56,475	
November 12	at Illinois	Memorial Stadium; Champaign, IL	L 14–49	53,645	
November 19	Minnesota	Camp Randall Stadium; Madison, WI (rivalry)	W 7–6	45,372	
*Non-conference game; ^{†}Homecoming; Rankings from AP Poll released prior to the game; Source:

== Team players in the 1967 NFL/AFL draft ==
Player	Position	Round	Pick	NFL club
Bill Gardner	Tight end	17	444	Green Bay Packers
