= Wally Gabler =

American football player (1944–2025)

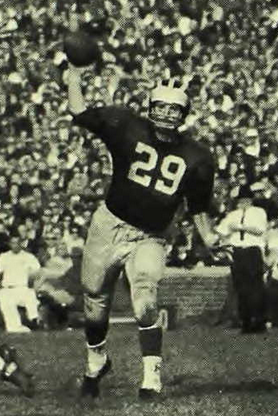
- Gabler preparing to pass, 1965

No. 12, 10, 11
- Position: QB

Personal information
- Born: June 9, 1944; Royal Oak, Michigan, U.S.
- Died: February 9, 2025 (aged 80); Heathcote, Ontario, Canada
- Listed height: 6 ft 2 in (1.88 m)
- Listed weight: 195 lb (88 kg)

Career information
- College: Michigan

Career history
- 1966–1969, 1972: Toronto Argonauts
- 1969–1970: Winnipeg Blue Bombers
- 1970–1972: Hamilton Tiger-Cats

Wallace Fredrick Gabler III (June 9, 1944 – February 9, 2025) was an American professional football player who was a quarterback for seven seasons in the Canadian Football League (CFL). He played college football for the Michigan Wolverines, starting at quarterback in 1965. Gabler was a starter in the CFL for the Toronto Argonauts (1966–1969), Winnipeg Blue Bombers (1969–1970), and Hamilton Tiger-Cats (1970–1972). He passed for 13,080 yards and 61 touchdowns in the CFL.

== Early life ==
Gabler was born in Royal Oak, Michigan, and attended Kimball High School there. He attended the New Mexico Military Institute (NMMI) after graduating from high school, with the hopes of qualifying for the United States Naval Academy the following year. At NMMI, Gabler broke Roger Staubach's school records for most passing touchdowns in a game and completion percentage and was selected as a junior college All-American.

== University of Michigan ==
Gabler transferred to the University of Michigan in 1963 without a scholarship and played for the freshman football team. As a junior, Gabler received a tuition-only scholarship, and appeared as a backup to Bob Timberlake on the 1964 Michigan team that won the Big Ten Conference championship.

As a senior in 1965, Gabler began the season as a backup to Dick Vidmer. Gabler got his first start in the second game of the season against Cal. Gabler started five games for the 1965 Wolverines and completed 58 of 126 passes for 825 yards, four touchdowns and two interceptions. He also gained 149 rushing yards.

Following his senior year, Gabler played in the 1965 Blue–Gray Football Classic.

Gabler's younger brother, John H. Gabler, also played football at Michigan, as a halfback from 1966 to 1969.

== Canadian Football League ==
Gabler played seven years in the Canadian Football League after graduating from Michigan in 1966. He began his professional football career as the starting quarterback for the Toronto Argonauts. As a rookie, he passed for 1,659 yards and rushed for another 373 yards. In his history of the Argonauts, Craig Wallace wrote: "In 1966, the offence was based on Wally Gabler running around the backfield looking for open receivers -- and when he couldn't find one, running for his life." Gabler remained with the Argonauts for three years. He had his best year in 1968 when he completed 205 of 365 passes for 3,242 yards and 18 touchdowns. He also rushed for 458 yards and four touchdowns for the 1968 Argonauts.

Interviewed in 1968, Gabler described his adjustment to the Canadian rules: "Of course, changing to three downs makes some difference. You have to be accustomed to putting the ball in the air more in Canada but the rules compensate."

In August 1969, Gabler was traded to the Winnipeg Blue Bombers in exchange for Dave Raimey. Gabler gained 2,288 passing yards for the Blue Bombers in 1969.

During the 1970 season, Gabler was traded to the Hamilton Tiger-Cats. He passed for 1,908 yards for the Tiger-Cats in 1970. He led the team to the Eastern regular season championship in 1970. In November 1970, the Canadian Press published a feature story about Gabler's role in leading the Tiger-Cats. The article described Gabler as "scholarly" and "soft-spoken" and noted:

Wally Gabler's shoulders will be carrying the lion's share of the load Sunday when he directs the Tiger-Cats in the first game of the Eastern Football Conference final against the Montreal Alouettes. And it's ironic in view of the nomadic life the 26-year-old Royal Oak, Mich. native has experienced in his short career in the Canadian Football League. ... Arriving in late September to fill in at quarterback for injured Joe Zuger, Gabler quickly picked up the intricate Hamilton offence and was one of the instruments in the Tiger-Cats' first place finish.

During the off-seasons from 1967 to 1971, Gabler sold securities for Richardson Securities of Canada.

In August 1972, Gabler returned to the Toronto Argonauts, who lost their quarterback Joe Theismann in the season opener. Gabler concluded his playing career in Toronto during the 1972 season, passing for 1,689 yards in 10 games.

In seven years in the CFL, Gabler completed 848 of 1,690 passes for 13,080 yards, 61 touchdowns and 118 interceptions.

== Later life and death ==
Gabler was a colour commentator on CTV in 1974. Gabler died from brain and prostate cancer in Heathcote, Ontario, on February 9, 2025, at the age of 80.
