= Tom Schuette =

American gridiron football player (born 1945)

Profile
- Position: Guard

Personal information
- Born: January 10, 1945; East St. Louis, Illinois, U.S.
- Died: August 6, 2024 (aged 79); St. Augustine, Florida, U.S.
- Listed height: 6 ft 1 in (1.85 m)
- Listed weight: 230 lb (104 kg)

Career information
- College: Indiana

Career history
- 1967–1977: Ottawa Rough Riders Number 56

Awards and highlights
- Grey Cup champion (1968, 1969, 1973, 1976); First-team All-Big Ten (1966)

Tom Schuette (January 10, 1945 – August 6, 2024) was an American professional Canadian football player who played for the Ottawa Rough Riders. He won the Grey Cup in 1968, 1969, 1973, and 1976. He previously played college football at Indiana University.
