= Jeff Richardson (American football) =

American football player (born 1944)

No. 74, 76, 68, 78
- Positions: Offensive lineman, defensive lineman

Personal information
- Born: September 1, 1944 (age 82); Johnstown, Pennsylvania, U.S.
- Listed height: 6 ft 3 in (1.91 m)
- Listed weight: 250 lb (113 kg)

Career information
- High school: Johnstown (Pennsylvania)
- College: Michigan State (1963–1966)
- NFL draft: 1967: 6th round, 146th overall pick

Career history
- New York Jets (1967–1968); Cincinnati Bengals (1969)*; Miami Dolphins (1969); Jersey Jays (1969–1970)
- * Offseason or practice squad member only

Awards and highlights
- Super Bowl champion (III); AFL champion (1968); Second-team All-Big Ten (1966)

Career AFL statistics
- Games played: 28
- Games started: 0
- Stats at Pro Football Reference

Jeffery A. Richardson (born September 1, 1944) is an American former professional football player who was an offensive lineman for three seasons in the American Football League (AFL) with the New York Jets and Miami Dolphins. He played college football for the Michigan State Spartans and was selected by the Jets in the sixth round of the 1967 NFL/AFL draft. He was a member of the Jets team that won Super Bowl III.

== Early life ==
Jeffery A. Richardson was born on September 1, 1944, in Johnstown, Pennsylvania. He participated in football, wrestling, and track at Johnstown High School. He won the state heavyweight wrestling title his junior year after going 22–0. Richardson had an overall wrestling record of 52–3 while in high school.

Richardson was inducted into the Cambria County Sports Hall of Fame in 1981 and the Pennsylvania Wrestling Coaches Association Hall of Fame in 2009.

== College career ==
Richardson was a member of the Spartans of Michigan State University from 1963 to 1966 as a defensive lineman. He earned United Press International second-team All-Big Ten honors in 1966. The Spartans were national champions in 1965 and 1966. Richardson won the Big Ten wrestling championship his sophomore year in 1966.

== Professional career ==
Richardson was selected by the New York Jets in the sixth round, with the 146th overall pick, of the 1967 NFL draft. He played in 11 games as a rookie in 1967. He re-signed with the Jets on May 23, 1968. Richardson appeared in all 14 games for the Jets during the 1968 season. He also played in both of the team's playoff games that year, including the Super Bowl III victory over the Baltimore Colts. He was listed as an offensive lineman while with the Jets.

On July 28, 1969, Richardson was traded to the Cincinnati Bengals for an undisclosed draft pick. He was waived by the Bengals in early September 1969.

On September 2, 1969, Richardson was claimed off waivers by the Miami Dolphins. He played in three games for the Dolphins during the 1969 season before being released. He was listed as a defensive tackle while with the Dolphins.

Richardson then played for the Jersey Jays of the Continental Football League from 1969 to 1970 as a defensive tackle.
