= Jimmy Raye Youth Foundation =

American youth education foundation

The Jimmy Raye Youth Foundation is an American organization started by football coach Jimmy Raye II with his friend Ronald "Chase" Chalmers as a means of benefiting underprivileged children in the Cumberland County area of North Carolina. It was incorporated in Wake County in 1998. The two joined their efforts to provide college scholarships to local students as well as cover registration fees for recreational sports. Each year, a luncheon is held to raise funds for the foundation and allow the local community to meet current and former NFL stars. At the conclusion of the luncheon, a free football clinic is held for the attending children and is directed by Raye as well as the attending past and present NFL players. The criteria for selecting a scholar recipient are determined by Chalmer's three children. While the scholarship is intended to provide an opportunity for a young person to attend college, academic performance and integrity are highly important as the foundation tries to enhance the success of adolescents in the Fayetteville, North Carolina, community.

== Mission ==
The mission of the Jimmy Raye Youth Foundation is to provide educational opportunities to identified "at-risk" adolescents that will enhance their ability to successfully function in society and positively impact the social and physical environment.

== Past speakers/events ==
2003 – Darrell Green, Washington Redskins cornerback

2004 – James Brown, sports commentator

2005 – Joe Theismann and Marcus Allen both attended the annual event in 2005. Joe Theismann was a former quarterback for the Washington Redskins and has done work as an NFL football analyst for ESPN. Marcus Allen was a former NFL running back who was inducted into the Pro Football Hall of Fame in 2003.

2006 – Marcus Allen attended the event for the second consecutive year and Sean Salisbury was a new guest speaker. Salisbury was a former NFL quarterback who now serves as an NFL analyst on Sportscenter and Sunday NFL Countdown.

2007 – Phil Simms, Super Bowl XXI MVP and a 15-year NFL veteran. He is a major analyst for the NFL on CBS.

2008 – Jamie Dukes, former NFL guard and center who became an analyst for NFL Total Access after his retirement. He is also the host of Put Up Your Dukes.

2009 – Tony Dungy, the first African-American coach to win a Super Bowl as he led the Indianapolis Colts in 2007. Dungy joined Mike Ditka and Tom Flores as the only individuals to win the Super Bowl as both a player and head coach. He is the author of four New York Times winning novels.

In addition to the keynote speakers for each annual event, numerous past and present NFL players attend the luncheon and kids' football clinic. Former attendees include Joe Horn, Eric Dickerson, Leon Washington, Jonathan Stewart, Wallace Wright, Joe Theismann, Ernest Byner, Darrell Green, Curtis Martin, Sean Salisbury, and Vonta Leach. From 2003–2008, the event was held at E.E. Smith High School in Fayetteville, NC. In 2009, the football clinic was held at Jack Britt High School.

== Officers ==
- Executive President – Jimmy Raye II
- President – Bill Commons
- Executive Administrator – Cressie Thigpen
- Administrative Assistant – Edwena F. Raye
- Board of Directors – Robin Raye Alston, Tommy Marsh, Michael Kapland, Olen Geralds, Rex Harris, Melody Chalmers, Chris Harris
- Advisory Board – Tyrone Willingham, Paula Quick Hall, Herman Edwards, Bobby Mitchell, Georgia Buchanon, Walt Douglas, Eric Dickerson, Marcus Allen
