= 1966 Minnesota Golden Gophers football team =

American college football season

1966 Minnesota Golden Gophers football
- Conference: Big Ten Conference
- Record: 4–5–1 (3–3–1 Big Ten)
- Head coach: Murray Warmath (13th season)
- MVP: Tim Wheeler
- Captain: Chuck Killian
- Home stadium: Memorial Stadium

1966 Big Ten Conference football standings
	Conf.					Overall
Team	W		L		T	W		L		T
No. 2 Michigan State $	7	–	0	–	0	9	–	0	–	1
No. 7 Purdue	6	–	1	–	0	9	–	2	–	0
Michigan	4	–	3	–	0	6	–	4	–	0
Illinois	4	–	3	–	0	4	–	6	–	0
Minnesota	3	–	3	–	1	4	–	5	–	1
Ohio State	3	–	4	–	0	4	–	5	–	0
Northwestern	2	–	4	–	1	3	–	6	–	1
Wisconsin	2	–	4	–	1	3	–	6	–	1
Indiana	1	–	5	–	1	1	–	8	–	1
Iowa	1	–	6	–	0	2	–	8	–	0
$ – Conference champion; Rankings from AP Poll

The 1966 Minnesota Golden Gophers football team represented the University of Minnesota in the 1966 Big Ten Conference football season. In their 13th year under head coach Murray Warmath, the Golden Gophers compiled a 4–5–1 record and were outscored by their opponents by a combined total of 160 to 124.

Linebacker Tim Wheeler received the team's Most Valuable Player award. Defensive lineman Ron Kamzelski and defensive lineman Bob Stein were named Academic All-Big Ten.

Total attendance at five home games was 248,248, an average of 49,600 per game. The largest crowd was against Iowa.

== Schedule ==
Date	Opponent	Site	Result	Attendance	Source
September 17	at Missouri*	Faurot Field; Columbia, MO	L 0–24	48,500	
September 24	Stanford*	Memorial Stadium; Minneapolis, MN	W 35–21	43,351	
October 1	Kansas*	Memorial Stadium; Minneapolis, MN	L 14–16	43,512	
October 8	at Indiana	Seventeenth Street Football Stadium; Bloomington, IN	T 7–7	34,721	
October 15	Iowa^{†}	Memorial Stadium; Minneapolis, MN (rivalry)	W 17–0	62,631	
October 22	at Michigan	Michigan Stadium; Ann Arbor, MI (Little Brown Jug)	L 0–49	71,749	
October 29	Ohio State	Memorial Stadium; Minneapolis, MN	W 17–7	49,489	
November 5	at Northwestern	Dyche Stadium; Evanston, IL	W 28–13	35,549	
November 12	Purdue	Memorial Stadium; Minneapolis, MN	L 0–16	49,085	
November 19	at Wisconsin	Camp Randall Stadium; Madison, Wisconsin (rivalry)	L 6–7	45,372	
*Non-conference game; ^{†}Homecoming; Source:
