= 1966 Northwestern Wildcats football team =

American college football season

1966 Northwestern Wildcats football
- Conference: Big Ten Conference
- Record: 3–6–1 (2–4–1 Big Ten)
- Head coach: Alex Agase (3rd season)
- MVP: Roger Murphy
- Captain: Cas Banaszek
- Home stadium: Dyche Stadium

1966 Big Ten Conference football standings
	Conf.					Overall
Team	W		L		T	W		L		T
No. 2 Michigan State $	7	–	0	–	0	9	–	0	–	1
No. 7 Purdue	6	–	1	–	0	9	–	2	–	0
Michigan	4	–	3	–	0	6	–	4	–	0
Illinois	4	–	3	–	0	4	–	6	–	0
Minnesota	3	–	3	–	1	4	–	5	–	1
Ohio State	3	–	4	–	0	4	–	5	–	0
Northwestern	2	–	4	–	1	3	–	6	–	1
Wisconsin	2	–	4	–	1	3	–	6	–	1
Indiana	1	–	5	–	1	1	–	8	–	1
Iowa	1	–	6	–	0	2	–	8	–	0
$ – Conference champion; Rankings from AP Poll

The 1966 Northwestern Wildcats team represented Northwestern University during the 1966 Big Ten Conference football season. In their third year under head coach Alex Agase, the Wildcats compiled a 3–6–1 record (2–4–1 against Big Ten Conference opponents) and finished in a tie for seventh place in the Big Ten Conference.

The team's offensive leaders were quarterback Bill Melzer with 1,171 passing yards, Bob McKelvey with 459 rushing yards, and Roger Murphy with 777 receiving yards.

== Schedule ==
Date	Opponent	Site	Result	Attendance	Source
September 17	at Florida*	Florida Field; Gainesville, FL	L 7–43	40,056	
September 24	Indiana	Dyche Stadium; Evanston, IL	L 14–26	37,777	
October 1	No. 4 Notre Dame*	Dyche Stadium; Evanston, IL (rivalry)	L 7–35	55,356	
October 8	at Oregon State*	Parker Stadium; Corvallis, OR	W 14–6	22,497	
October 15	at Wisconsin	Camp Randall Stadium; Madison, WI	T 3–3	53,163	
October 22	at Iowa	Kinnick Stadium; Iowa City, IA	W 24–15	54,613	
October 29	No. 2 Michigan State	Dyche Stadium; Evanston, IL	L 0–22	44,304	
November 5	Minnesota	Dyche Stadium; Evanston, IL	L 13–28	35,549	
November 12	at Michigan	Michigan Stadium; Ann Arbor, MI (rivalry)	L 20–28	58,556	
November 19	Illinois	Dyche Stadium; Evanston, IL (rivalry)	W 35–7	37,625	
*Non-conference game; Rankings from AP Poll released prior to the game; Source:
