= 1966 Indiana Hoosiers football team =

American college football season

1966 Indiana Hoosiers football
- Conference: Big Ten Conference
- Record: 1–8–1 (1–5–1 Big Ten)
- Head coach: John Pont (2nd season)
- MVP: Frank Stavroff
- Captain: Frank Stavroff
- Home stadium: Seventeenth Street Stadium

1966 Big Ten Conference football standings
	Conf.					Overall
Team	W		L		T	W		L		T
No. 2 Michigan State $	7	–	0	–	0	9	–	0	–	1
No. 7 Purdue	6	–	1	–	0	9	–	2	–	0
Michigan	4	–	3	–	0	6	–	4	–	0
Illinois	4	–	3	–	0	4	–	6	–	0
Minnesota	3	–	3	–	1	4	–	5	–	1
Ohio State	3	–	4	–	0	4	–	5	–	0
Northwestern	2	–	4	–	1	3	–	6	–	1
Wisconsin	2	–	4	–	1	3	–	6	–	1
Indiana	1	–	5	–	1	1	–	8	–	1
Iowa	1	–	6	–	0	2	–	8	–	0
$ – Conference champion; Rankings from AP Poll

The 1966 Indiana Hoosiers football team represented the Indiana Hoosiers in the 1966 Big Ten Conference football season. The Hoosiers played their home games at Seventeenth Street Stadium in Bloomington, Indiana. The team was coached by John Pont, in his second year as head coach of the Hoosiers.

== Schedule ==
Date	Time	Opponent	Site	Result	Attendance	Source
September 17		Miami (OH)*	Seventeenth Street Stadium; Bloomington, IN	L 10–20	28,538	
September 24		at Northwestern	Dyche Stadium; Evanston, IL	W 26–14	37,777	
October 1	7:30 p.m.	at Texas*	Memorial Stadium; Austin, TX	L 0–35	56,000	
October 8		Minnesota	Seventeenth Street Stadium; Bloomington, IN	T 7–7	34,721	
October 15		Illinois^{†}	Seventeenth Street Stadium; Bloomington, IN (rivalry)	L 10–24	39,339	
October 21		at Miami (FL)*	Miami Orange Bowl; Miami, FL	L 7–14	19,627	
October 29		at Iowa	Iowa Stadium; Iowa City, IA	L 19–20	38,952	
November 5		at Ohio State	Ohio Stadium; Columbus, OH	L 0–7	80,834	
November 12		No. 2 Michigan State	Seventeenth Street Stadium; Bloomington, IN (rivalry)	L 19–37	30,096	
November 19		at No. 10 Purdue	Ross–Ade Stadium; West Lafayette, IN (Old Oaken Bucket)	L 6–51	62,197	
*Non-conference game; ^{†}Homecoming; Rankings from AP Poll released prior to the game; All times are in Eastern time; Source:

== 1967 NFL draftees ==
Player	Position	Round	Pick	NFL club
Bob Van Pelt	Center	5	114	Philadelphia Eagles
