= 1966 Purdue Boilermakers football team =

American college football season

1966 Purdue Boilermakers football

Rose Bowl champion

Rose Bowl, W 14–13 vs. USC
- Conference: Big Ten Conference

Ranking
- Coaches: No. 6
- AP: No. 7
- Record: 9–2 (6–1 Big Ten)
- Head coach: Jack Mollenkopf (11th season)
- MVP: Bob Griese
- Captains: Bob Griese; George Catavolos
- Home stadium: Ross–Ade Stadium

1966 Big Ten Conference football standings
	Conf.					Overall
Team	W		L		T	W		L		T
No. 2 Michigan State $	7	–	0	–	0	9	–	0	–	1
No. 7 Purdue	6	–	1	–	0	9	–	2	–	0
Michigan	4	–	3	–	0	6	–	4	–	0
Illinois	4	–	3	–	0	4	–	6	–	0
Minnesota	3	–	3	–	1	4	–	5	–	1
Ohio State	3	–	4	–	0	4	–	5	–	0
Northwestern	2	–	4	–	1	3	–	6	–	1
Wisconsin	2	–	4	–	1	3	–	6	–	1
Indiana	1	–	5	–	1	1	–	8	–	1
Iowa	1	–	6	–	0	2	–	8	–	0
$ – Conference champion; Rankings from AP Poll

The 1966 Purdue Boilermakers football team represented Purdue University in the 1966 Big Ten Conference football season. The Boilermakers, led by future National Football League (NFL) quarterback Bob Griese, won the 1967 Rose Bowl. Griese led Purdue to a second-place finish in the Big Ten Conference and the school's first appearance in the Rose Bowl Game. The Boilermakers were the runner-up in the Big Ten behind Michigan State, but received the conference's Rose Bowl berth because of the Big Ten's "no-repeat" rule at the time. Griese was a two-time All-American at Purdue and was the runner-up to Steve Spurrier for the Heisman Trophy in 1966.

== Schedule ==
Date	Opponent	Rank	Site	TV	Result	Attendance	Source
September 17	Ohio*	No. 8	Ross–Ade Stadium; West Lafayette, IN		W 42–3	47,172	
September 24	at No. 8 Notre Dame*	No. 7	Notre Dame Stadium; Notre Dame, IN (rivalry)	ABC	L 14–26	59,075	
October 1	SMU*		Ross–Ade Stadium; West Lafayette, IN		W 35–23	46,116	
October 8	Iowa		Ross–Ade Stadium; West Lafayette, IN		W 35–0	52,715	
October 15	at Michigan	No. 9	Michigan Stadium; Ann Arbor, MI		W 22–21	79,642	
October 22	at No. 2 Michigan State	No. 9	Spartan Stadium; East Lansing, MI	ABC	L 20–41	78,014	
October 29	Illinois^{†}		Ross–Ade Stadium; West Lafayette, IN (rivalry)		W 25–21	61,643	
November 5	at Wisconsin		Camp Randall Stadium; Madison, WI		W 23–0	56,475	
November 12	at Minnesota		Memorial Stadium; Minneapolis, MN		W 16–0	49,085	
November 19	Indiana	No. 10	Ross–Ade Stadium; West Lafayette, IN (Old Oaken Bucket)		W 51–6	62,197	
January 1	vs. USC*	No. 7	Rose Bowl; Pasadena, CA (Rose Bowl)	NBC	W 14–13	101,455	
*Non-conference game; ^{†}Homecoming; Rankings from AP Poll released prior to the game; Source:

== Roster ==
1966 Purdue Boilermakers football team roster
Players
Coaches
Offense

Pos.	#	Name	Class
RB		Bob Baltzell
OL		Mike Barnes
WR	81	Jim Beirne	Jr
OL		Jim Bonk
OL		Jack Calcaterra
WR		Bob Dillingham
QB		Mike Engelbrecht
OL		Charles Erlenbaugh
WR		Jim Finley
QB	12	Bob Griese (C)	Sr
TE		Marion Griffin
RB		Dave Herrick
RB		Bob Hurst
RB	23	Leroy Keyes	So
OL		Chuck Kuzneski
OL		Pat Labus
TE		Rich Ruble
G	65	Bob Sebeck	Jr
RB		Lou Sims
RB	47	Perry Williams	So

Defense

Pos.	#	Name	Class
LB		Francis Burke
DB	86	George Catavolos (C)	Sr
DB	25	John Charles	Sr
DB		Dennis Cirbes
LB		Pat Conley
DB	45	Bob Corby	Jr
DL		Robert Holmes
DL		Chuck Kyle
DL		George Olion
DL		Lance Olssen
DL		Fred Rafa
LB		Bob Yunaska

Special teams

Pos.	#	Name	Class

Head coach

- Jack Mollenkopf

Coordinators/assistant coaches

- Bob DeMoss
- Len Jardine
- Ned Maloney
- Ron Meyer

Legend

- (C) Team captain
- (S) Suspended
- (I) Ineligible
- Injured
- Redshirt

== Game summaries ==
=== At Notre Dame ===
Purdue at Notre Dame

Team	1	2	3	4	Total
No. 8 Boilermakers	7	0	0	7	14
• No. 6 Fighting Irish	7	7	0	12	26

- Date: September 24
- Location: Notre Dame Stadium, South Bend, IN
- Game attendance: 59,075
- Television network: ABC (national)

Scoring summary
1	PUR	Leroy Keyes 94-yard fumble return (kick good)	PUR 7-0
1	ND	Nick Eddy 96-yard kickoff return (kick good)	Tied 7-7
2	ND	Jim Seymour 84-yard pass from Terry Hanratty (kick good)	ND 14-7
4	ND	Jim Seymour 39-yard pass from Terry Hanratty	ND 20-7
4	PUR	Perry Williams 1-yard run (kick good)	ND 20-14
4	ND	Jim Seymour 7-yard pass from Terry Hanratty	ND 26-14

=== At Michigan ===
Purdue at Michigan

Team	1	2	3	4	Total
• No. 9 Boilermakers	7	7	2	6	22
Wolverines	0	14	7	0	21

- Date: October 15
- Location: Michigan Stadium, Ann Arbor, MI
- Game attendance: 79,642

=== At Michigan State ===
Purdue at Michigan State

Team	1	2	3	4	Total
No. 9 Boilermakers	0	0	7	13	20
• No. 2 Spartans	7	14	14	6	41

- Date: October 22
- Location: Spartan Stadium, East Lansing, Michigan
- Game attendance: 70,014

Scoring summary
Q1	MSU	Lee 3-yard run (Kenney kick)	MSU 7–0
Q2	MSU	Raye 16-yard run (Kenney kick)	MSU 14–0
Q2	MSU	Apisa 6-yard pass from Raye (Kenney kick)	MSU 21–0
Q3	MSU	Apisa 2-yard run (Kenney kick)	MSU 28–0
Q3	PUR	Griese 6-yard run (Griese kick)	MSU 28–7
Q3	MSU	Apisa 10-yard run (Kenney kick)	MSU 35–7
Q4	PUR	Hurst 2-yard run (kick failed)	MSU 35–13
Q4	MSU	Cavender 2-yard run (pass failed)	MSU 41–13
Q4	PUR	Griese 2-yard run (Griese kick)	MSU 41–20

=== Indiana ===
- Purdue clinches Rose Bowl berth
- Bob Griese 11/21, 255 Yds, 3 TD, 1 FG, 6/7 XP
- Leroy Keyes Rush TD, Pass TD, INT
- Jim Beirne 2 TD Rec
- Biggest margin in rivalry since 1893

=== USC (Rose Bowl) ===
Purdue vs. USC

Team	1	2	3	4	Total
• No. 7 Boilermakers	0	7	7	0	14
Trojans	0	7	0	6	13

- Date: January 2
- Location: Rose Bowl, Pasadena, CA
- Game attendance: 101,438
- TV announcers (NBC): Curt Gowdy

Scoring summary
Q2	PUR	Perry Williams 1-yard run (Griese kick)	PUR 7–0
Q2	USC	McCall 1-yard run (Rossovich kick)	Tied 7–7
Q3	PUR	Perry Williams 1-yard run (Griese kick)	PUR 14–7
Q4	USC	Rod Sherman 19-yard pass from Troy Winslow (pass failed)	PUR 14–13

== Team players in the NFL ==
Player	Position	Round	Pick	NFL club
Bob Griese	Quarterback	1	4	Miami Dolphins
John Charles	Defensive back	6	145	New England Patriots
Mike Barnes	Defensive back	8	194	Pittsburgh Steelers
Pat Conley	Linebacker	14	359	Baltimore Colts
George Catavolos	Defensive back	17	437	Philadelphia Eagles

== Awards and honors ==
- Bob Griese, Sammy Baugh Trophy
- Bob Griese, second in Heisman Trophy voting
