= Jimmy Raye II =

American football player and coach (born 1946)

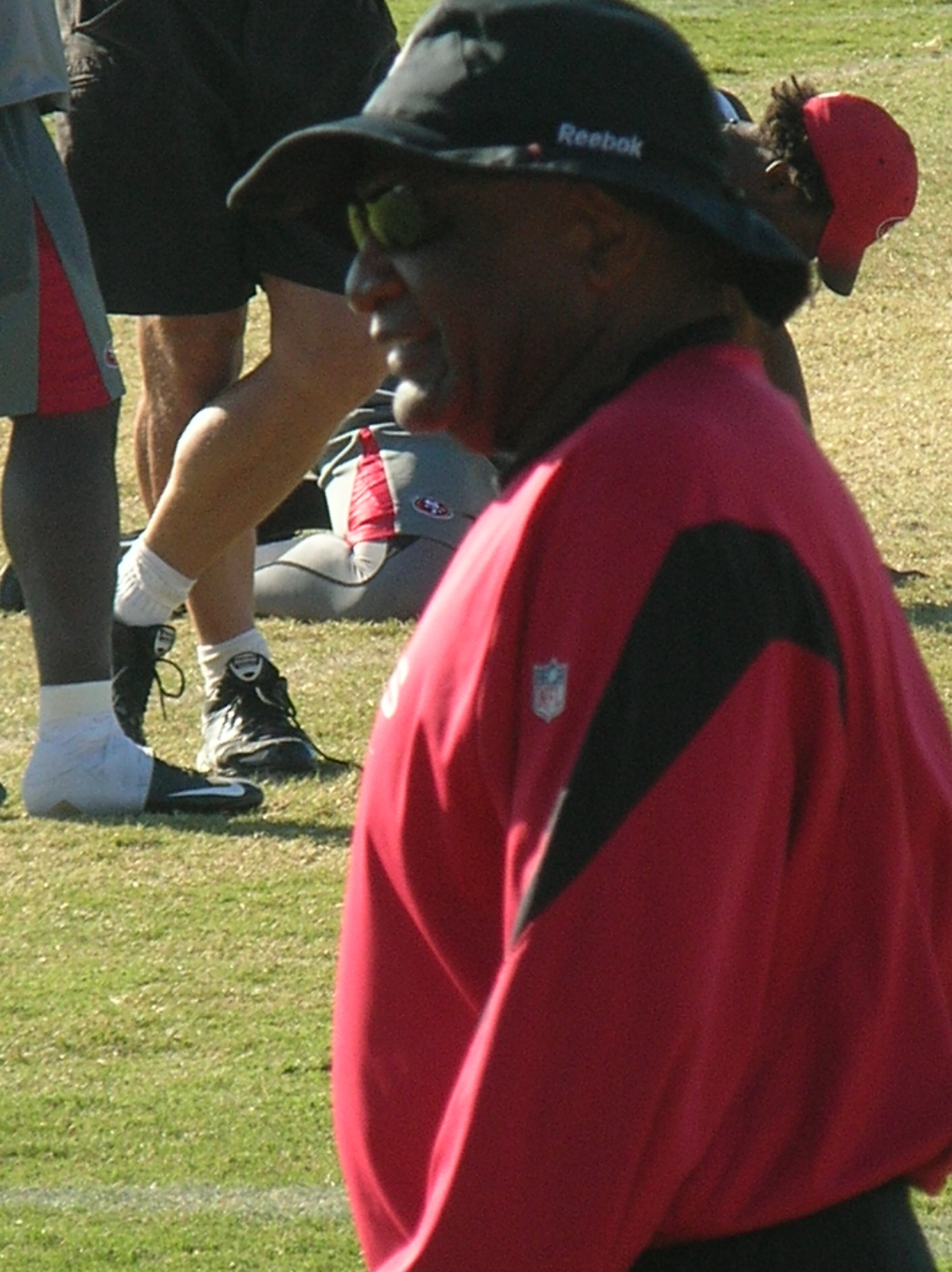
- Raye at 49ers training camp in August 2010

No. 30
- Position: Cornerback

Personal information
- Born: March 26, 1946 (age 80); Fayetteville, North Carolina, U.S.
- Listed height: 6 ft 0 in (1.83 m)
- Listed weight: 185 lb (84 kg)

Career information
- High school: E. E. Smith (Fayetteville)
- College: Michigan State (1965-1967)
- NFL draft: 1968: 16th round, 431st overall pick

Career history

Playing
- Los Angeles Rams (1968); Philadelphia Eagles (1969)

Coaching
- Michigan St. (1971–1975) Assistant coach; Wyoming (1976) Assistant coach; Texas (1977) Assistant coach; San Francisco 49ers (1977) Wide receivers coach; Detroit Lions (1978–1979) Running backs coach; Atlanta Falcons (1980–1982) Wide receivers coach; Los Angeles Rams (1983–1984) Offensive coordinator; Tampa Bay Buccaneers (1985–1986) Offensive coordinator; Atlanta Falcons (1987–1989) Wide receivers coach; New England Patriots (1990) Offensive coordinator; Los Angeles Rams (1991) Wide receivers coach; Kansas City Chiefs (1992–2000) Offensive coordinator, running backs coach, tight ends coach; Washington Redskins (2001) Offensive coordinator; New York Jets (2002–2003) Senior offensive assistant; Oakland Raiders (2004–2005) Offensive coordinator; New York Jets (2006–2008) Running backs coach; San Francisco 49ers (2009–2010) Offensive coordinator; Tampa Bay Buccaneers (2012–2013) Senior offensive assistant

Awards and highlights
- Second-team All-Big Ten (1966)

Career NFL statistics
- Fumble recoveries: 1
- Stats at Pro Football Reference
- Coaching profile at Pro Football Reference

James Arthur Raye Jr. (born March 26, 1946) is an American football coach and former player.

== Playing career ==
Raye attended the segregated E. E. Smith High School in Fayetteville, North Carolina.

In college, as a quarterback, Raye was the backup for the Michigan State Spartans football team that played in the 1966 Rose Bowl, and he started for the 1966 Spartans in the famous 10–10 tie with Notre Dame, a game often referred to as "The Game of the Century." He was the South's first black quarterback to win a national title, on the 1966 Michigan State team. (The first black quarterback to win a national title was Minnesota's Sandy Stephens, from Uniontown, Pennsylvania, in 1960.) Raye and College Football Hall of Famers Bubba Smith (from Texas), George Webster (South Carolina) and Gene Washington (Texas) arrived at Michigan State from the segregated South as part of head coach Duffy Daugherty's Underground Railroad.

Raye was drafted in the 16th round of the 1968 NFL draft by the Los Angeles Rams for the position of cornerback but was quickly traded to the Philadelphia Eagles.

== Coaching career ==
Raye began his coaching career in 1971 at his alma mater, Michigan State, where he stayed for five years (1971–75). He served a brief stint at Wyoming in 1976 and Texas in 1977 before moving to the NFL ranks in 1977.

He coached in the NFL for a total of 36 years with 10 different teams, serving as offensive coordinator for 13 seasons: 1983–84 with the Los Angeles Rams, 1985–86 with the Tampa Bay Buccaneers, 1990 with the New England Patriots, 1998–2000 with the Kansas City Chiefs, 2001 with the Washington Redskins, 2004–05 with the Oakland Raiders (where he was also assistant head coach), and 2009–10 with the San Francisco 49ers.

Following the 2009 49ers season, Raye was praised for his ability to adapt the offense after key players were injured, and he continued as the 49ers' offensive coordinator to start the 2010 season. This was the first time in seven years that the 49ers had an offensive coordinator return to the team for consecutive seasons. But Raye was fired after the 49ers lost their first three games of 2010.

In 1998 he founded the Jimmy Raye Youth Foundation for underprivileged youngsters.

== Personal life ==
His son, Jimmy Raye III, is currently the senior executive advisor to the GM for the Cleveland Browns.
