= John Wright (wide receiver) =

American football player (born 1946)

No. 45, 89
- Position: Wide receiver

Personal information
- Born: January 11, 1946 (age 80); Oak Park, Illinois, U.S.
- Listed height: 6 ft 0 in (1.83 m)
- Listed weight: 197 lb (89 kg)

Career information
- High school: Central (IL)
- College: Illinois (1964-1967)
- NFL draft: 1968: 2nd round, 53rd overall pick

Career history
- Atlanta Falcons (1968); Detroit Lions (1969); Chicago Fire (1974)*
- * Offseason or practice squad member only

Awards and highlights
- First-team All-Big Ten (1967); Second-team All-Big Ten (1966)

Career NFL statistics
- Receptions: 12
- Receiving yards: 130
- Receiving touchdowns: 2
- Stats at Pro Football Reference

John William Wright (born January 11, 1946) is an American former professional football player who was a wide receiver in the National Football League (NFL). He played college football for the Illinois Fighting Illini. Wright played in the NFL for the Atlanta Falcons in 1968 and for the Detroit Lions in 1969.
