= 1966 All-Big Ten Conference football team =

American college football all-star team

The 1966 All-Big Ten Conference football team consists of American football players chosen by various organizations for All-Big Ten Conference teams for the 1966 Big Ten Conference football season. Players from the 1966 Michigan State Spartans football team dominated the All-Big Ten team in 1966, taking eight of the 22 first-team spots. Players from Purdue and Michigan each received four spots.

== Offensive selections ==
=== Quarterbacks ===
- Bob Griese, Purdue (AP-1; UPI-1)
- Jimmy Raye II, Michigan State (AP-2; UPI-2)

=== Running backs ===
- Clinton Jones, Michigan State (AP-1; UPI-1 [halfback])
- Jim Detwiler, Michigan (AP-1; UPI-1 [halfback])
- Dave Fisher, Michigan (AP-2; UPI-1 [fullback])
- Bob Apisa, Michigan State (AP-1)
- Bo Rein, Ohio State (AP-2; UPI-2 [halfback])
- Carl Ward, Michigan (AP-2; UPI-2 [halfback])
- Mike Krivoshia, Indiana (UPI-2 [fullback])

=== Ends ===
- Gene Washington, Michigan State (AP-1; UPI-1)
- Jack Clancy, Michigan (AP-1; UPI-1)
- John Wright, Illinois (AP-2; UPI-2)
- Jim Beirne, Purdue (AP-2)
- Cas Banaszek, Northwestern (UPI-2)

=== Tackles ===
- Jack Calcaterra, Purdue (AP-1; UPI-1)
- Jerry West, Michigan State (AP-1; UPI-1)
- Mike Barnes, Purdue (AP-2; UPI-2)
- John Przybcki, Michigan State (AP-2)
- James Hribal, Michigan (AP-2)

=== Guards ===
- Chuck Erlenbaugh, Purdue (AP-1)
- Tom Schuette, Indiana (AP-1)
- Donald A. Bailey, Michigan (UPI-1)
- Anthony Conti, Michigan State (UPI-1)
- Henry Hanna, Michigan (AP-2)
- Bob Sebeck, Purdue (AP-2)
- Ron Guenther, Illinois (UPI-2)
- Bruce Gunstra, Northwestern (UPI-2)

=== Centers ===
- Ray Pryor, Ohio State (AP-1; UPI-1)
- Charles Killian, Minnesota (AP-2)
- Bob Van Pelt, Indiana (UPI-2)

== Defensive selections ==
=== Ends ===
- Bubba Smith, Michigan State (AP-1; UPI-1)
- Ken Kmiec, Illinois (AP-1; UPI-2)
- George Olion, Purdue (UPI-1)
- Philip Hoag, Michigan State (AP-2)
- John McCambridge, Northwestern (UPI-2)
- Jim Sniadecki, Indiana (AP-2)

=== Tackles ===
- Lance Olssen, Purdue (AP-1; UPI-1)
- Nick Jordan, Michigan State (AP-1)
- Dick Himes, Ohio State (UPI-1)
- Pat Gallinagh, Michigan State (AP-2; UPI-2)
- Fred Harms, Illinois (AP-2)
- Jeff Richardson, Michigan State (UPI-2)

=== Guards ===
- Chuck Kyle, Purdue (UPI-1)
- Edward Duren, Minnesota (UPI-2)

=== Linebackers ===
- Frank Nunley, Michigan (AP-1; UPI-1)
- Chuck Thornhill, Michigan State (AP-1; UPI-1)
- George Webster, Michigan State (AP-1 [def. back]; UPI-1)
- Bob Richter, Wisconsin (AP-1; UPI-2)
- Dave Moreland, Iowa (AP-2; UPI-2)
- Frank Burke, Purdue (AP-2)
- Gary Reierson, Minnesota (AP-2)
- Dave Tomasula, Illinois (UPI-2)

=== Defensive backs ===
- Bruce Sullivan, Illinois (AP-1; UPI-1)
- Rich Volk, Michigan (AP-1; UPI-1)
- Phil Clark, Northwestern (AP-1; UPI-2)
- Jess Phillips, Michigan State (UPI-1)
- Leroy Keyes, Purdue (AP-2; UPI-2)
- Dick Gibbs, Iowa (AP-2)
- Phil Knell, Illinois (AP-2)
- John Rowser, Michigan (UPI-2)
- Tom Schinke, Wisconsin (AP-2)

== Key ==
AP = Associated Press, "selected by a board of sports writers covering the Big Ten scene"

UPI = United Press International, selected by the conference coaches

Bold = First-team selection of both the AP and UPI

== See also ==
- 1966 College Football All-America Team
