= Jim Beirne =

American football player (1946–2021)

No. 81, 85, 88
- Positions: Wide receiver, Tight end

Personal information
- Born: October 15, 1946; McKeesport, Pennsylvania, U.S.
- Died: May 28, 2021 (aged 74); Kerrville, Texas, U.S.
- Listed height: 6 ft 2 in (1.88 m)
- Listed weight: 206 lb (93 kg)

Career information
- High school: McKeesport
- College: Purdue
- NFL draft: 1968: 4th round, 105th overall pick

Career history
- Houston Oilers (1968–1973); San Diego Chargers (1974); Houston Oilers (1975–1976)

Awards and highlights
- AFL All-Star (1969); First-team All-American (1966); Second-team All-American (1967); First-team All-Big Ten (1967); Second-team All-Big Ten (1966)

Career NFL/AFL statistics
- Receptions: 142
- Receiving yards: 2,011
- Touchdowns: 11
- Stats at Pro Football Reference

James Patrick Beirne (October 15, 1946 – May 28, 2021) was an American professional football player who was a wide receiver in the American Football League (AFL) and National Football League (NFL). He played college football at Purdue University, where he was an All-American, and first-team All-Big Ten as a senior (1967). He played professionally for the Houston Oilers of the AFL and was named an AFL All-Star in 1969. He later played in the NFL for the Oilers and San Diego Chargers.

== Early life ==
Beirne was born on October 15, 1946, in McKeesport, Pennsylvania. He attended McKeesport High School, where he was a wide receiver on the football team. In 1963, as a 6 ft 1 in (1.85 m) 180 lb (81.6 kg) senior, Beirne had 69 receptions for 1,075 yards and seven touchdowns. He received the most votes for the WPIAL (Western Pennsylvania Interscholastic Athletic League) Class AA All-Star Team that year. In December 1963, the Associated Press (AP) selected Beirne to its first-team All-Pennsylvania All-Star scholastic football team. He was selected to play in the 1964 Big 33 Game between high school all-stars from Texas and Pennsylvania.

He also played outfielder on McKeesport's baseball team.

== College career ==
Beirne attended Purdue University, where he played three varsity seasons for the Boilermakers (1965 to 1967), playing in the Big Ten Conference. Purdue's quarterback in 1965 and 1966 was future Pro Football Hall of Fame quarterback Bob Griese.

Beirne played tight end as a sophomore in 1965. He was third on the team in receptions (29) and receiving yards (384), behind wide receivers Bob Hadrick (47) and Jim Finley (33). Beirne was first on the team in yards per reception (13.2) and receiving touchdowns (four). He was tied for third in the Big Ten in receiving touchdowns and was eighth in yards per reception. Purdue had a 7–2–1 record that season. Beirne was named the team's outstanding sophomore player.

As a junior in 1966, Beirne moved to wide receiver, replacing Bob Hadrick who had graduated. Beirne led the Boilermakers in receptions (64) and receiving yards (768). His eight receiving touchdowns that year was best in the Big Ten. He was second in the Big Ten in total receptions and fourth in receiving yards, and was sixth nationally in receptions. Purdue finished the season 9–2, ranked No. 7 nationally by the Associated Press. Purdue defeated the 1966 USC Trojans in the Rose Bowl, 14–13. Beirne caught a 39-yard pass in the game, but lost an opportunity to score a touchdown. He caught Griese's pass at the USC two-yard line, but fumbled at the goal line as he was being tackled; before reaching the endzone.

The Associated Press named Beirne second team All-Big Ten in November 1966. United Press International (UPI) gave him honorable mention on its All-Big Ten team. He was named to the first-team offense on the Central Press Association Captains' All-America Team in 1966. He was an AP and UPI honorable mention All-American that year.

As a senior in 1967, Beirne tied Leroy Keyes for the team lead with 45 receptions (tied for fourth in the Big Ten), and had 643 receiving yards and five touchdown receptions. Purdue had an 8–2 record and was ranked No. 9 by the Associated Press that year. The Associated Press and UPI named Beirne first-team All-Big Ten in 1967. The AP and UPI also named him an honorable mention All-American in 1967. He was again named a Central Press Captains' All-American in 1967. Beirne's teammates elected him honorary captain at the end of the season.

Beirne was chosen to play in the late December 1967 East West Shrine Game in San Francisco, and in the January 1968 Hula Bowl.

== Professional career ==
The Houston Oilers selected Beirne in the fourth round of the 1968 NFL/AFL draft, 105th overall. Beirne started 12 games at wide receiver as a rookie for the Oilers. He was third on the team with 31 receptions, 474 receiving yards, and four touchdowns. His best game that year was on November 28 against the Kansas City Chiefs, when he had four receptions for 103 yards and a 66-yard touchdown reception from Oilers' quarterback Pete Beathard. He had two touchdown receptions in the season's final game; a victory that gave the Oilers a second-place finish with a 7–7 record that season.

Beirne started all 14 Oilers' games the following season (1969). He had 42 receptions for 540 yards and four touchdowns, and was selected to play in the 1969 AFL All-Star Game. This was the final game in AFL history, as the AFL merged into the NFL for play the following season. In a November 9 game against the Cincinnati Bengals, Beirne had six receptions for 114 yards and two touchdowns (on passes of 37 and 34 yards).

Beirne started seven games in 1970, but became a reserve wide receiver playing behind Charlie Joiner during the season. Beirne's best game that year came against the eventual Super Bowl V Champion Baltimore Colts in week four, with six receptions for 85 yards. Joiner had suffered a broken arm before the 1970 season started, and was not activated until Houston's sixth game of the season on October 25 (in which he caught five passes for 100 yards). Beirne had 11 receptions for 142 yards in the five games before Joiner's return, and five receptions for 74 yards over the final nine games of the season. Jerry LeVias led the Oilers' wide receivers in receptions that season.

The Oilers traded LeVias before the 1971 season and Beirne once again became a full-time starter at wide receiver. He started 13 games in 1971, with 38 receptions for 550 yards and one touchdown. This was Beirne's last season as a full-time starter, and he would only start three games over the remainder of his career. Beirne began the 1972 season as a reserve and did not start a game until week six, because of an injury to starter Ken Burrough (though Burrough came into Game 6 and caught an 80-yard touchdown pass). Beirne started two games that season, with only seven receptions for 95 yards. He suffered a knee injury and did not play in the final four games of the 1972 season; and had surgery after the season ended.

Beirne suffered a stone bruise on his heel before the 1973 season. He appeared in only one game, the first week of the season; and was placed on injured reserve for most of the 1973 season. It is reported that when Oilers' head coach Sid Gillman attempted to pass Beirne through waivers at the end of the 1973 season so Beirne could play a game in Pittsburgh near his hometown of McKeesport, the San Diego Chargers claimed Beirne off waivers for the $100 fee. He signed with the Chargers in early December 1973, reportedly joining the Chargers before the last two games of the season, though he is not listed on their 1973 roster.

He began the 1974 season as a reserve receiver with the Chargers, playing behind former Oilers' teammate Jerry LeVias, and Gary Garrison. Beirne was with the Chargers for 14 games in 1974, not starting any. He had seven receptions for 121 yards, but had a leg injury limiting his play that season. Beirne had three of those receptions for 61 yards in the Chargers first game of the 1974 season, against the Oilers.

The Chargers released Beirne in mid-August 1975, and he returned to his home in Houston. He rejoined the Oilers in 1975 for six games, after the team suffered a number of injuries and needed players. Beirne had one reception in 1975 and played on special teams. The Oilers waived Beirne in late August 1976 and again in early September 1976, but re-signed him during the season.

The Oilers signed Beirne on four separate occasions between the end of the 1975 season and the end of September 1976, releasing him three times during September 1976. He was on the Oilers' 1976 roster for seven games, without a reception. He returned a kickoff 12 yards on November 1, 1976 and played in his last NFL game on November 7. He underwent knee surgery and was out for the remainder of the 1976 season. After finishing the 1976 season on the injured reserved list, the Oilers waived Beirne in March 1977.

During his career Beirne was lacking in speed compared to other wide receivers, but excelled in catching the ball and in his competitiveness. He had a willingness to catch passes in the middle of the field, knowing he would be hit hard. In his eight seasons with the Oilers, Beirne started 49 games, with 135 receptions for 1,890 yards (14 yards per reception) and eleven touchdowns. He had 142 receptions for 2,011 yards over his entire career.

== Personal life and death ==
After Beirne retired, he and his wife Jody established Jim Beirne Custom Homes in the Houston area. They had two sons (Kevin and Mike) and a daughter (Kathleen Ann) who predeceased Beirne. Beirne and Jody lived in Fredericksburg, Texas for about five years before his death in late May 2021.

Beirne's sons were both athletes as well. His son Kevin Beirne was a receiver on Texas A&M's college football team, and was a Major League Baseball right-handed pitcher for three seasons 2000 to 2002. Beirne's son Mike Beirne was a tight end, wide receiver, and linebacker at the University of Kentucky from 1998 to 2001.

Beirne died of complications from Alzheimer's disease on May 28, 2021 in Kerrville, Texas.

== See also ==
- Other American Football League players
