= 1967 Rose Bowl =

American college football game

- 53rd Rose Bowl Game
Purdue Boilermakers	USC Trojans
(8–2)	(7–3)
Big Ten	AAWU
14	13
Head coach: Jack Mollenkopf	Head coach: John McKay
AP / Coaches; 7 / 6	AP / Coaches; NR / 18
	1	2	3	4	Total
Purdue	0	7	7	0	14
USC	0	7	0	6	13
- Date: January 2, 1967
- Season: 1966
- Stadium: Rose Bowl
- Location: Pasadena, California
- MVP: John Charles (DB, Purdue)
- Favorite: Purdue by 14 points
- National anthem: USC Marching Band
- Referee: Jack Sprenger (AAWU) (split crew: AAWU, Big Ten)
- Halftime show: Spirit of Troy, Purdue All-American Marching Band
- Attendance: 101,438

United States TV coverage
- Network: NBC
- Announcers: Lindsey Nelson, Terry Brennan
- Nielsen ratings: 29.3

The 1967 Rose Bowl was the 53rd edition of the college football bowl game, played at the Rose Bowl in Pasadena, California, on Monday, January 2, 1967. The game was played between the Purdue Boilermakers of the Big Ten Conference and the USC Trojans of the AAWU. A total of 101,438 people attended the game. Purdue won 14−13.

Purdue defensive back John Charles was named the Player of the Game. Because New Year's Day fell on Sunday in 1967, the game was delayed until January 2.

== Teams ==
=== Purdue Boilermakers ===
This was Purdue's first Rose Bowl appearance, led by All-American quarterback Bob Griese. The team participated in the Rose Bowl with an 8–2 record, finishing second in the Big Ten Conference. Purdue's only losses were to #1 Notre Dame and #2 Michigan State. Conference champion Michigan State was undefeated at 7–0 in the Big Ten, but the conference's "no-repeat" rule barred the team from playing in the Rose Bowl. Purdue's only other appearance in the Rose Bowl was 34 years later, in January 2001.

=== USC Trojans ===
The USC Trojans, representing the Athletic Association of Western Universities (AAWU), came into the game with a 7–3 record, ranked in the second ten of the AP Poll and #18 in the UPI coaches poll. They were controversially awarded with the Rose Bowl bid over UCLA, despite the Bruins' #5 ranking, 9–1 record, and 14–7 victory over the Trojans. Because of a flaw in the schedule, USC played one more conference game than UCLA and had a 4–1 AAWU record to UCLA's 3–1. Prior to the UCLA-USC game, it was widely assumed that the winner would go to the Rose Bowl.

USC was voted in to the Rose Bowl by the AAWU athletic directors before prior to the game with Notre Dame on November 26, a 51–0 shutout loss in Los Angeles. Many thought awarding USC the Rose Bowl was to make up for 1964, when USC and Oregon State tied for the AAWU title. In that year, it was assumed that if USC upset #1 Notre Dame in its final game, they would get the nod over Oregon State. USC beat Notre Dame 20–17, but Oregon State was awarded the Rose Bowl berth over USC based on a tiebreaker of most recent Rose bowl appearance despite Oregon State's better overall record (8–2 vs. 7–3). The head coach of Oregon State in 1964 was Tommy Prothro, who left after the season for UCLA. Another factor may have been an ankle injury sustained by Bruin junior quarterback Gary Beban, the Heisman Trophy winner in 1967. USC started the season with six wins, then dropped three of their last four games going into the matchup with Purdue. This was the first of four consecutive Rose Bowl appearances for the Trojans; the Pac-8 did not have a "no-repeat" rule.

== Game summary ==
As 1967 was an odd-numbered year, the Athletic Association of Western Universities (AAWU) representative (USC) was designated the home team and wore cardinal red jerseys, while Purdue, the visiting team, wore white jerseys with gold pants and helmets.

The game was played largely defensively. Neither team scored in the first quarter. Both teams only reached the end zone once in the second quarter. The halftime score was 7–7. Purdue took a 14–7 lead in the third quarter after a touchdown run by fullback Perry Williams. With less than two minutes to play, USC scored a touchdown on a Troy Winslow pass to Rod Sherman for 19 yards. Coach John McKay tried for a two-point conversion to secure the win against Purdue, but Purdue's George Catavolos intercepted the pass in the end zone to preserve the 14–13 victory.

Purdue's astronaut alumni (Neil Armstrong, Gene Cernan, Gus Grissom, and Roger Chaffee), attended the 1967 Tournament of Roses Parade and Rose Bowl game. Less than four weeks later, on January 27, Grissom and Chaffee died in the Apollo 1 fire in Florida.

== Scoring ==
=== First quarter ===
- No scoring

=== Second quarter ===
- Purdue - Perry Williams 1-yard run (Bob Griese kick)
- USC - Don McCall 1-yard run (Tim Rossovich kick)

=== Third quarter ===
- Purdue - Williams 2-yard run (Griese kick)

=== Fourth quarter ===
- USC - Rod Sherman 19-yard pass from Troy Winslow (pass failed: interception)
