= John Rowser =

American football player (born 1944)

No. 45, 48, 46
- Position: Defensive back

Personal information
- Born: April 24, 1944 (age 82); Birmingham, Alabama, U.S.
- Listed height: 6 ft 1 in (1.85 m)
- Listed weight: 190 lb (86 kg)

Career information
- High school: Detroit (MI) Eastern
- College: Michigan (1962-1966)
- NFL draft: 1967: 3rd round, 78th overall pick

Career history
- Green Bay Packers (1967–1969); Pittsburgh Steelers (1970–1973); Denver Broncos (1974–1976)

Awards and highlights
- Super Bowl champion (II); NFL champion (1967); Second-team All-Big Ten (1966)

Career NFL statistics
- Interceptions: 26
- Fumble recoveries: 6
- Touchdowns: 4
- Stats at Pro Football Reference

John Felix Rowser (born April 24, 1944) is an American former professional football player, a defensive back in the National Football League (NFL) for ten seasons with the Green Bay Packers, Pittsburgh Steelers, and Denver Broncos.

In his rookie season, he was a member of the Packers' Super Bowl II championship team, Vince Lombardi's last title. He played college football at the University of Michigan as a cornerback and halfback, from 1963 to 1966.

== Early life ==
Born in Birmingham, Alabama, Rowser attended Eastern High School in Detroit, Michigan.

== College career ==
Rowser enrolled at the University of Michigan in 1962 and played college football for head coach Bump Elliott from 1963 to 1966. As a senior, he started all 10 games at cornerback and three games at left halfback for the 1966 Michigan Wolverines football team that compiled a 6–4 record, outscored opponents 236–138, and finished in third place in the Big Ten Conference. Used principally on defense, he gained only 82 yards on 24 carries (3.4 yards per carry) as an offensive player.

== Professional career ==
Rowser was selected by the Green Bay Packers in the third round (78th overall pick) of the 1967 NFL/AFL draft. He signed with the Packers in March 1967, and appeared in 42 regular season games for the Packers from 1967 through 1969 including the Super Bowl II victory over the Oakland Raiders in his rookie season.

In March 1970, the Packers traded Rowser to Pittsburgh Steelers in exchange for tight end John Hilton. Rowser played for the Steelers for four years from 1970 to 1973, appearing in 47 games, including 42 as the team's starting left cornerback.

In 1974, Rowser joined the Denver Broncos. He remained with the Broncos for three seasons from 1974 to 1976, appearing in 38 games, including 37 games as a starter at the left cornerback (1974) and free safety (1975–1976) positions. Rowser cleared waivers and was released by the Broncos in June 1977.

During his decade in the NFL, Rowser appeared in 127 games, 79 as a starter, and intercepted 26 passes for 444 return yards and four touchdowns. He also recovered six fumbles. He missed, by one year, the Steelers' and Broncos' Super Bowl appearances.
