= Dave Fisher =

American football player (born 1946)

Profile
- Position: Fullback

Personal information
- Born: c. 1946 (age 79–80)
- Listed height: 5 ft 10 in (1.78 m)
- Listed weight: 210 lb (95 kg)

Career information
- High school: Fairmont (OH)
- College: University of Michigan (1964–1966)

Awards and highlights
- First-team All-Big Ten (1966); Academic All-American (1966); NCAA Post-Graduate Scholarship (1966); Big Ten Medal of Honor (1967)

Dave Fisher (born c. 1946) is an American former football player. He played in the fullback position for the University of Michigan from 1964 to 1966. He was a first-team All-Big Ten player and an Academic All-American in 1966.

Fisher grew up in Kettering, Ohio, and attended Fairmont High School. He played for the Michigan Wolverines football team from 1964 to 1966. As a junior in 1965, he gained 575 rushing yards, seventh best in the Big Ten Conference. Despite sustaining a shoulder injury in an October 29, 1966 game against Wisconsin, Fisher gained 672 rushing yards in 1966, fourth best in the Big Ten. His average of 5.1 yards per rushing carry in 1966 was second-best in the Big Ten. In October 1966, he rushed for a career-high 120 yards in a 22–21 loss to Bob Griese's Purdue Boilermakers. He was selected by the conference coaches for the United Press International as a first-team back on the 1966 All-Big Ten Conference football team.

Fisher was an engineering student at Michigan. He was selected as an Academic All-American in 1966, received the Big Ten Conference Medal of Honor, and was one of 11 athletes in 1966 who received an NCAA Postgraduate Scholarship. Fisher used the scholarship to study toward a master's degree which he received in 1971.

Fisher signed with the Pittsburgh Steelers as an undrafted free agent in April 1967, but was released during training camp in July. He played for the Ypsilanti Vikings of the Midwest Football League in 1967. He signed with the Baltimore Colts in May 1968, and retired from football in the middle of training camp in July.
