= John Charles (American football) =

American football player (1944–2019)

No. 25
- Positions: Cornerback, Safety

Personal information
- Born: May 9, 1944; Newark, New Jersey, U.S.
- Died: June 16, 2019 (aged 75); Houston, Texas, U.S.
- Listed height: 6 ft 0 in (1.83 m)
- Listed weight: 205 lb (93 kg)

Career information
- High school: Linden (Linden, New Jersey)
- College: Purdue
- NFL draft: 1967: 1st round, 21st overall pick

Career history
- Boston Patriots (1967-1969); Minnesota Vikings (1970); Houston Oilers (1971–1974)

Awards and highlights
- Second-team All-Big Ten (1965)

Career NFL/AFL statistics
- Interceptions: 16
- Fumble recoveries: 2
- Touchdowns: 2
- Stats at Pro Football Reference

John James Charles (May 9, 1944 – June 16, 2019) was an American football cornerback and safety who played eight seasons in the National Football League (NFL). He played college football at Purdue University where he was an All-American in 1966 and the Rose Bowl MVP in leading the Boilermakers over USC on January 2. Charles prepped at Linden High School in Linden, New Jersey. He was inducted into the Purdue Intercollegiate Athletic Hall of Fame on April 18, 2015.

Charles was a first round selection in the 1967 NFL/AFL draft, taken by the Boston Patriots. In early October 1970, he was sent to Minnesota as compensation after Boston signed quarterback Joe Kapp. He played for the Houston Oilers from 1971 through 1974.

Charles died in Houston at age 76 in 2019.
