= Jack Mollenkopf =

American football player and coach (1903–1975)

Biographical details
- Born: November 24, 1903; Convoy, Ohio, U.S.
- Died: December 4, 1975 (aged 72); Rochester, Minnesota, U.S.

Playing career
- 1925–1926: Bowling Green
- Position: End

Coaching career (HC unless noted)
- 1947–1955: Purdue (line)
- 1956–1969: Purdue

Head coaching record
- Overall: 84–39–9
- Bowls: 1–0

Accomplishments and honors

Championships
- 1 Big Ten (1967)
- College Football Hall of Fame; Inducted in 1988 (profile)

Kenneth Webster "Jack" Mollenkopf (November 24, 1903 – December 4, 1975) was the head football coach at Purdue University from 1956 until 1969. Mollenkopf was also an assistant coach at Purdue from 1947 to 1955 under Stu Holcomb.

Mollenkopf was a successful football coach competing at high school and college levels and is widely acknowledged as the greatest football coach in Purdue's history. While coaching high school, he led Toledo Waite to three national championships. Mollenkopf is Purdue's all-time leader in Big Ten Conference wins (58) and conference winning percentage (.637). His 84 wins at Purdue placed him first on the school's all-time wins list until Joe Tiller passed him in 2008, and he ranks fourth in overall winning percentage (.670). Mollenkopf's Boilermakers were nationally ranked for 80 weeks, the most under any Purdue head coach, and captured the No. 1 spot the first five weeks of the 1968 season.

On January 2, 1967, Mollenkopf coached the Purdue's first appearance in the Rose Bowl, leading the Boilermakers to a 14–13 victory over USC. Against Purdue's in-state rivals, Mollenkopf tallied an 11–2–1 record versus Indiana and a 10–4 mark against Notre Dame. From 1966 to 1969, a Purdue player finished in the top three in balloting for the Heisman Trophy: quarterback Bob Griese was second in 1966, halfback Leroy Keyes placed third in 1967 and second in 1968, and quarterback Mike Phipps finished as runner-up in 1969. Mollenkopf's inaugural season in 1956 was the only losing campaign of his tenure as head coach at Purdue.

A prominent figure on the sidelines of postseason all-star games, Mollenkopf served as head coach of the 1958, 1959, and 1960 Blue–Gray Football Classics; the 1962 and 1963 East–West Shrine Games; the 1964, 1967, and 1970 Hula Bowls; the 1968 All-American Bowl; and the 1969 North–South Shrine Game. Mollenkopf was inducted into the College Football Hall of Fame in 1988; the Bowling Green State University Hall of Fame in 1965 and the Indiana Football Hall of Fame in 1975. In 1994, Coach Mollenkopf was inducted as a member of the inaugural class of the Purdue Intercollegiate Athletic Hall of Fame.

Mollenkopf died of cancer on December 4, 1975, at the Mayo Clinic in Rochester, Minnesota.

== Head coaching record ==
Year	Team	Overall	Conference	Standing	Bowl/playoffs	Coaches^{#}	AP^{°}
Purdue Boilermakers (Big Ten Conference) (1956–1969)
1956	Purdue	3–4–2	1–4–2	T–7th			
1957	Purdue	5–4	4–3	T–4th			
1958	Purdue	6–1–2	3–1–2	4th		11	13
1959	Purdue	5–2–2	4–2–1	T–3rd			
1960	Purdue	4–4–1	3–4	T–5th		15	19
1961	Purdue	6–3	4–2	4th		11	12
1962	Purdue	4–4–1	3–3	T–5th			
1963	Purdue	5–4	4–3	4th			
1964	Purdue	6–3	5–2	3rd			
1965	Purdue	7–2–1	5–2	T–3rd		13	
1966	Purdue	9–2	6–1	2nd	W Rose	6	7
1967	Purdue	8–2	6–1	T–1st		9	9
1968	Purdue	8–2	5–2	T–3rd		11	10
1969	Purdue	8–2	5–2	3rd		18	18
Purdue:		84–39–9	58–32–5				
Total:		84–39–9					
National championship Conference title Conference division title or championship game berth
^{#}Rankings from final Coaches Poll.; ^{°}Rankings from final AP Poll.
