= 1966 Michigan State Spartans football team =

American college football season

1966 Michigan State Spartans football

NFF co-national champion Big Ten champion
- Conference: Big Ten Conference

Ranking
- Coaches: No. 2
- AP: No. 2
- Record: 9–0–1 (7–0 Big Ten)
- Head coach: Duffy Daugherty (13th season)
- MVP: George Webster
- Captains: Clinton Jones; George Webster
- Home stadium: Spartan Stadium

1966 Big Ten Conference football standings
	Conf.					Overall
Team	W		L		T	W		L		T
No. 2 Michigan State $	7	–	0	–	0	9	–	0	–	1
No. 7 Purdue	6	–	1	–	0	9	–	2	–	0
Michigan	4	–	3	–	0	6	–	4	–	0
Illinois	4	–	3	–	0	4	–	6	–	0
Minnesota	3	–	3	–	1	4	–	5	–	1
Ohio State	3	–	4	–	0	4	–	5	–	0
Northwestern	2	–	4	–	1	3	–	6	–	1
Wisconsin	2	–	4	–	1	3	–	6	–	1
Indiana	1	–	5	–	1	1	–	8	–	1
Iowa	1	–	6	–	0	2	–	8	–	0
$ – Conference champion; Rankings from AP Poll

The 1966 Michigan State Spartans football team was an American football team that represented Michigan State University in the 1966 Big Ten Conference football season. In their 13th season under head coach Duffy Daugherty, the Spartans compiled a 9–0–1 record (7–0 in conference games), outscored opponents by a total of 293 to 99, won the Big Ten championship, and were ranked No. 2 in the final AP and UPI polls. They played to a 10–10 tie against No. 1 Notre Dame. While the AP and UPI polls recognized Notre Dame as national champion, the College Football Researchers Association selected Michigan State as national champion, and the Helms Athletic Foundation, National Football Foundation (NFF), and Poling System selected the Irish and Spartans as co-national champions.

The Spartans gained an average of 230.5 rushing yards and 124.4 passing yards per game, while holding opponents to an average of 51.4 rushing yards and 157.9 passing yards. The team's individual statistical leaders included halfback Clinton Jones (784 rushing yards), end Gene Washington (27 receptions for 677 yards), and quarterback Jimmy Raye (1,100 passing yards).

Three Spartans were consensus first-team All-Americans: Jones; defensive end Bubba Smith; and defensive back George Webster. End Gene Washington and fullback Bob Apisa also received first-team All-America honors. Smith, Webster, and Washington were later inducted into the College Football Hall of Fame. Four Spartans were among the first eight players picked in the 1967 NFL/AFL draft: Smith (first); Jones (second); Webster (fifth); and Washington (eighth).

Big Ten rules barred the same team from representing the conference in the Rose Bowl in consecutive seasons and barred teams from appearing in any bowl game other than the Rose Bowl. Accordingly, Michigan State was ineligible to play in the Rose Bowl or any other bowl game. The former rule was rescinded in 1972 and the latter in 1975.

== Schedule ==
Date	Opponent	Rank	Site	Result	Attendance	Source
September 17	NC State*	No. 2	Spartan Stadium; East Lansing, MI	W 28–10	55,418	
September 24	Penn State*	No. 1	Spartan Stadium; East Lansing, MI (rivalry)	W 42–8	65,763	
October 1	at Illinois	No. 1	Memorial Stadium; Champaign, IL	W 26–10	57,747	
October 8	Michigan	No. 1	Spartan Stadium; East Lansing, MI (rivalry)	W 20–7	78,833	
October 15	at Ohio State	No. 1	Ohio Stadium; Columbus, OH	W 11–8	84,282	
October 22	No. 9 Purdue^{†}	No. 2	Spartan Stadium; East Lansing, MI	W 41–20	78,004	
October 29	at Northwestern	No. 2	Dyche Stadium; Evanston, IL	W 22–0	44,304	
November 5	Iowa	No. 2	Spartan Stadium; East Lansing, MI	W 56–7	68,711	
November 12	at Indiana	No. 2	Seventeenth Street Stadium; Bloomington, IN (rivalry)	W 37–19	30,096	
November 19	No. 1 Notre Dame*	No. 2	Spartan Stadium; East Lansing, MI (rivalry)	T 10–10	80,011	
*Non-conference game; ^{†}Homecoming; Rankings from AP Poll released prior to the game; Source:

== Game summaries ==
=== Michigan ===
Michigan at Michigan State

Team	1	2	3	4	Total
Wolverines	0	0	0	7	7
• No. 1 Spartans	7	0	0	13	20

- Date: October 8
- Location: Spartan Stadium, East Lansing, Michigan
- Game attendance: 78,833

Scoring summary
Q1	MSU	Raye 5 yard run (Kenney kick)	MSU 7–0
Q4	MSU	Apisa 7 yard run (kick failed)	MSU 13–0
Q4	MSU	Washington 25 yard pass from Raye (Kenney kick)	MSU 20–0
Q4	MICH	Detwiler 15 yard pass from Vidmer (Sygar kick)	MSU 20–7

=== At Ohio State ===
Michigan State at Ohio State

Team	1	2	3	4	Total
• Spartans	0	0	3	8	11
Buckeyes	2	0	0	6	8

- Date: October 15
- Location: Ohio Stadium
- Game attendance: 84,282
- Game weather: Rain, wind SE 20-35, 69 °F (21 °C)

Scoring summary
Q1	8:09	OSU	Safety, center pass through end zone	OSU 2–0
Q3	6:02	MSU	Kenny 27-yard field goal	MSU 3–2
Q4	14:53	OSU	Long 47-yard pass to Anders (kick failed)	OSU 8–3
Q4	7:09	MSU	Apisa 1-yard run (Kenney pass to Wedemeyer)	MSU 11–8

=== Purdue ===
Purdue at Michigan State

Team	1	2	3	4	Total
No. 9 Boilermakers	0	0	7	13	20
• No. 2 Spartans	7	14	14	6	41

- Date: October 22
- Location: Spartan Stadium, East Lansing, Michigan
- Game attendance: 70,014
- TV announcers: ABC

Scoring summary
Q1	MSU	Lee 3 yard run (Kenney kick)	MSU 7–0
Q2	MSU	Raye 16 yard run (Kenney kick)	MSU 14–0
Q2	MSU	Apisa 6 yard pass from Raye (Kenney kick)	MSU 21–0
Q3	MSU	Apisa 2 yard run (Kenney kick)	MSU 28–0
Q3	PUR	Griese 6 yard run (Griese kick)	MSU 28–7
Q3	MSU	Apisa 10 yard run (Kenney kick)	MSU 35–7
Q4	PUR	Hurst 2 yard run (kick failed)	MSU 35–13
Q4	MSU	Cavender 2 yard run (pass failed)	MSU 41–13
Q4	PUR	Griese 2 yard run (Griese kick)	MSU 41–20

=== Notre Dame ===
Notre Dame at Michigan State

Team	1	2	3	4	Total
No.1 Fighting Irish	0	7	0	3	10
No. 2 Spartans	0	10	0	0	10

- Date: November 19
- Location: Spartan Stadium, East Lansing, Michigan
- TV announcers (ABC): Chris Schenkel, Bud Wilkinson

Scoring summary
2	MSU	Cavender 4-yard run (Kenney kick)	MSU 7-0
2	MSU	Kenney 47-yard field goal	MSU 10-0
2	ND	Gladieux 34-yard pass from O'Brien (Azzaro kick)	MSU 10-7
4	ND	Azzaro 28-yard field goal	Tied 10-10

The 1966 Michigan State vs. Notre Dame football game ("The Game of the Century") remains one of the greatest, and most controversial, games in college football history. The game was played in Michigan State's Spartan Stadium on November 19, 1966. Michigan State entered the contest 9–0 and ranked No. 2, while Notre Dame entered the contest 8–0 and ranked No. 1. Notre Dame elected not to try to score on its final series, thus the game ended in a 10–10 tie. Notre Dame retained its No. 1 ranking in the AP and UPI polls.

== Roster ==
1966 Michigan State Spartans football team roster
Players
Coaches
Offense

Pos.	#	Name	Class
FB	45	Robert Apisa	Jr
RB		Rich Berlinski
WR		Al Brenner
RB	25	Regis Cavender	So
OL		Tony Conti
QB		Bill Feraco
WR		Maurice Haynes
WR		Ken Heft
RB	26	Clinton Jones	Sr
RB	34	Dwight Lee	Jr
OL		Mitchell Pruiett
OT	57	Joe Przybycki	Jr
OL		Ron Ranieri
QB	16	James Raye	Jr
OL		Lawrence Smith
OL		Dave Techlin
WR	84	Gene Washington	Sr
RB		Frank Waters
QB		Charlie Wedemeyer
OL		Jerry West

Defense

Pos.	#	Name	Class
DB		Sterling Armstrong
DL	61	Charles Bailey	So
DL		George Chatlos
DL	55	Pat Gallinagh
DB		Drake Garrett
LB		Ron Goovert
DL		Phil Hoag
DB		Jerry Jones
DL		Nick Jordan
S		Jess Phillips	Jr
DE		Jeff Richardson	Sr
DL	95	Bubba Smith	Sr
DB	20	James Summers	Sr
DB	41	Charlie Thornhill	Sr
LB	90	George Webster	Sr

Special teams

Pos.	#	Name	Class
K	42	Dick Kenney	Sr

Head coach

- Duffy Daugherty

Coordinators/assistant coaches

Legend

- (C) Team captain
- (S) Suspended
- (I) Ineligible
- Injured
- Redshirt

== Team members in the NFL ==
- In the 1967 NFL/AFL draft, four of the top eight picks in the draft were players from Michigan State.

Player	Position	Round	Pick	NFL franchise
Bubba Smith	Defensive end	1	1	Baltimore Colts
Clinton Jones	Running back	1	2	Minnesota Vikings
George Webster	Linebacker	1	5	Houston Oilers
Gene Washington	Wide receiver	1	8	Minnesota Vikings
Jeff Richardson	Defensive end	6	146	New York Jets
James Summers	Defensive back	9	217	Denver Broncos
Charlie Thornhill	Defensive back	9	232	Boston Patriots
Dick Kenney	Kicker	14	358	Philadelphia Eagles
