= Frank Nunley =

American football player (1945–2024)

No. 57
- Position: Linebacker

Personal information
- Born: October 1, 1945; Lexington, Alabama, U.S.
- Died: June 26, 2024 (aged 78); San Jose, California, U.S.
- Listed height: 6 ft 2 in (1.88 m)
- Listed weight: 229 lb (104 kg)

Career information
- High school: Belleville (Belleville, Michigan)
- College: Michigan
- NFL draft: 1967: 3rd round, 62nd overall pick

Career history
- San Francisco 49ers (1967–1976)

Awards and highlights
- First-team All-Big Ten (1966)

Career NFL statistics
- Fumble recoveries: 9
- Interceptions: 14
- Sacks: 9
- Stats at Pro Football Reference

Frank Hembre Nunley (October 1, 1945 – June 26, 2024), nicknamed "Fudge Hammer", was an American professional football linebacker who played for the San Francisco 49ers of the National Football League (NFL) from 1967 to 1976. He played college football at the University of Michigan from 1964 to 1966.

== Early life ==
Nunley was born in Lexington, Alabama, in 1945, and attended Belleville High School in Belleville, Michigan. He was known as "Tink" by his classmates, and was the football team’s fullback.

== College career ==
Nunley played college football for the University of Michigan from 1964 to 1966. He was selected by the Associated Press as a first-team linebacker on its 1966 All-Big Ten Conference football team. He was inducted into the University of Michigan Athletic Hall of Honor in 1989.

== Professional career ==
Nunley was selected by the San Francisco 49ers in the third round (62nd overall pick) of the 1967 NFL/AFL draft. He remained with the 49ers for 10 seasons from 1967 to 1976. Playing at the linebacker position, Nunley became a starter in 1969 and anchored the 49ers defense in the early 1970s that ran an innovative "flex" defense under Dick Nolan. He helped lead the 1970 and 1971 49ers teams to consecutive appearances in the NFL championship games, losing both times to the Dallas Cowboys.

== Later life ==
After retiring from football, Nunley lived in Los Altos, California, and sold electronics for Sanmina-SCA.
