= Richard Gibbs (Canadian football) =

Canadian and American football player (born 1945)

Dick Gibbs
Profile
- Position: Halfback

Personal information
- Born: c. 1945 (age 80–81); Oak Park, Illinois, U.S.
- Listed height: 6 ft 1 in (1.85 m)
- Listed weight: 187 lb (85 kg)

Career information
- College: Iowa
- NFL draft: 1967: 13th round, 325th overall pick

Career history
- 1967: Hamilton Tiger-Cats

Awards and highlights
- Grey Cup champion (1967); Second-team All-Big Ten (1966)

Richard Gibbs (born c. 1945) was a Canadian and American football player who played for the Hamilton Tiger-Cats. He won the Grey Cup with them in 1967. He previously played college football at the University of Iowa (winning letters in 1965 and 1966) and lived in Chariton, Iowa. He was selected in the 1967 NFL draft by the San Francisco Giants in Round 13.
