= Ron Guenther =

American football player, coach, and administrator (born 1945)

Biographical details
- Born: October 3, 1945 (age 81)

Playing career
- 1965–1966: Illinois
- Position: Offensive lineman

Coaching career (HC unless noted)
- 1971–1974: Boston College (OL)
- 1975–1978: North Central (IL)

Administrative career (AD unless noted)
- 1988: Illinois (interim AD)
- 1992–2011: Illinois

Head coaching record
- Overall: 22–12–2

Accomplishments and honors

Awards
- Second-team All-Big Ten (1966)

Ronald E. Guenther (born October 3, 1945) is an American former football player, coach, and college athletics administrator. He served as the head football coach at North Central College in Naperville, Illinois from 1975 to 1978, compiling a record of 22–12–2. Guenther was the athletic director at the University of Illinois at Urbana–Champaign from 1992 until he retired on July 1, 2011.

== Education and playing career ==
Guenther is a graduate of the University of Illinois, having earned a Bachelor of Science in physical education in 1967 and an M.S. in administration in 1968. Guenther also played football at Illinois, lettering in 1965 and 1966 as an offensive lineman as well as being named second-team All-Big Ten and the team MVP in 1966. While at Illinois, Guenther was a member of Kappa Sigma fraternity.

== Administrative career ==
University of Illinois Chancellor Richard Herman was quoted in July, 2006 as saying: "If he's not the best AD in the country, I want to know who is." and "He does a wonderful job of bringing in great coaches and building a team that understands what athletics is and needs to be about." (Herman was later relieved of his duties after a scholarship scandal.)

=== Coaches hired ===
==== Football ====
- Ron Turner, 1997–2004
- Ron Zook, 2005–2011

==== Men's basketball ====
- Lon Kruger, 1996–2000
- Bill Self, 2000–2003
- Bruce Weber, 2004–2012

==== Women's basketball ====
- Theresa Grentz, 1995–2006
- Jolette Law, 2007–2012

=== Women's volleyball ===
- Don Hardin, 1996–2009
- Kevin Hambly, 2009–2017

==== Men's tennis ====
- Craig Tiley, 1993-2005
- Brad Dancer, 2006–current

==== Women's tennis ====
- Michelle Dasso, 2006–2015

==== Men's Track and Field ====
- Wayne Angel, 2003–2009

=== Wrestling ===
- Jim Heffernan, 2009–2021

=== Facility construction ===
- Atkins Tennis Center
- Reconstruction of Memorial Stadium
- Pending decision to renovate Assembly Hall or build a new basketball arena, expected in early 2009

=== Criticism ===
Guenther came under fire for an outburst during the 2007 NCAA Tournament, calling an Illini player an "idiot".

Guenther has also been widely criticized by Illinois fans for the poor performance of the Illinois football team during his tenure.

== Head coaching record ==
Year	Team	Overall	Conference	Standing	Bowl/playoffs
North Central Cardinals (College Conference of Illinois and Wisconsin) (1975–1978)
1975	North Central	5–3–1	5–2–1	2nd	
1976	North Central	5–3–1	4–3–1	5th	
1977	North Central	6–3	5–3	3rd	
1978	North Central	6–3	5–3	T–3rd	
North Central:		22–12–2	19–11–2		
Total:		22–12–2			
