= Dick Vidmer =

American football player (1944–2022)

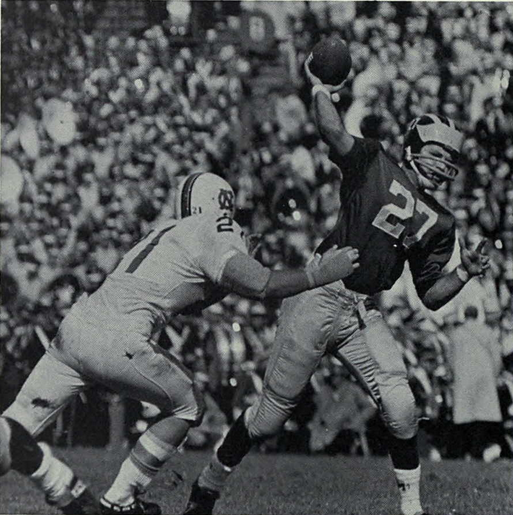

Profile
- Position: Quarterback

Personal information
- Born: December 24, 1944
- Died: April 3, 2022

Career information
- College: Michigan

Richard F. Vidmer (December 24, 1944 — April 3, 2022) was an American football player. He attended University of Michigan, where he played college football as a quarterback for the Wolverines football teams from 1965 to 1967.

== Early life ==
Vidmer's father played college football as a guard at Villanova University in the 1930s. The younger Vidmer was a native of Greensburg, Pennsylvania, and grew up in western Pennsylvania, which Vidmer described as "a peculiar place, where you have a lot of small towns within 10-15 miles of each other, and football is simply the sport throughout the area." He attended Hempfield Area High School, where he was one of the finest prep quarterbacks ever produced in the State of Pennsylvania. He was also president of the student council and had grades that won him admission to Harvard. In a 1966 interview, he described his college selection process as follows:

"Yea. I was accepted at Harvard. My dad was really fired up for Ivy League -- you know, prestige and ivy covered walls . . . I visited Harvard and Princeton and got an idea about that, and then I visited Purdue and MSU too and I kinda got the idea that I wanted a school that played good football, but also offered a good academic program. Ivy League football leaves a lot to be desired . . . and MSU is a little short on academics. So I came here and haven't been sorry a minute."

== University of Michigan ==
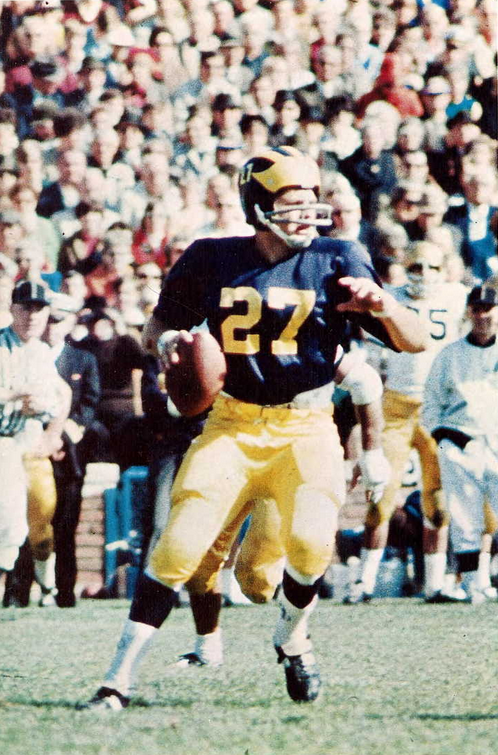
Vidmer from 1968 Michiganensian

As a freshman in 1964, Vidmer suffered a broken leg and torn ankle ligaments during a football practice session. Vidmer never recovered fully from the injury, recalling later, "I was never able to move around like I could before. It made a difference in my effectiveness. I was not as formidable a player as I once was." He started only three games in the 1965 season, completing 32 of 68 passes with seven interceptions.

In 1966, Vidmer was Michigan's starting quarterback in nine of its ten games. In the opening game of the 1966 season, he threw for 258 passing yards, a Michigan single-game record. Five weeks later, he completed 15 of 19 passes for 210 yards and three touchdowns in a 49–0 victory over Minnesota and was selected as the UPI Midwest Back of the Week. His total of 117 pass completions in 1966 set a new Michigan single-season record. Vidmer was also selected as an Academic All-American in 1966.

Vidmer also started four games at quarterback for the 1967 Wolverines. In his three years at Michigan, he completed 187 of 382 passes for 2,455 yards, 11 touchdowns, and 20 interceptions.

Vidmer received three degrees from Michigan, a bachelor's degree in economics, a master's degree in Soviet government and politics (1972), and a Ph.D. in Soviet management theory (1978).

=== Career passing statistics ===
Season	Att	Comp	Int	Comp %	Yds	Yds/Comp	TD
1965	66	31	6	47.0	454	14.6	1
1966	225	117	7	52.0	1609	13.8	10
1967	76	33	4	43.4	337	10.2	0
Career total	367	181	17	49.3	2400	13.3	11

== Later life ==
Vidmer later taught at the University of Virginia and served as an advisor to U.S. Congressman Donald A. Bailey, a former Michigan football teammate. He also served as a county commissioner in Westmoreland County, Pennsylvania. He was court-appointed to the county commissioner position in 1985 and elected to the position in November 1987. He became the chairman of the county commissioners. Vidmer was diagnosed with multiple sclerosis in 1983 and was forced to retire in 1999.
