= 1965 All-Eastern football team =

American all-star college football team

The 1965 All-Eastern football team consists of American football players chosen by various selectors as the best players at each position among the Eastern colleges and universities during the 1965 NCAA University Division football season.

== Offense ==
=== Quarterback ===
- Ken Lucas, Pittsburgh (AP-1)
- Jim Ward, Gettysburg (AP-2)

=== Halfbacks ===
- Floyd Little, Syracuse (AP-1)
- Ron Landeck, Princeton (AP-1)
- Eric Crabtree, Pittsburgh (AP-2)
- Sonny Stowers, Army (AP-2)

=== Fullback ===
- Dave McNaughton, Penn State (AP-1)
- Larry Csonka, Syracuse (AP-2)

=== Ends ===
- Tom Mitchell, Bucknell (AP-1)
- Milt Morin, UMass (AP-1)
- Jack Curry, Penn State (AP-2)
- Phil Norton, Navy (AP-2)

=== Tackles ===
- Joe Bellas, Penn State (AP-1)
- Mike Addesa, Holy Cross (AP-1)
- Steve Diamond, Harvard (AP-2)
- Joe Lilly, Holy Cross (AP-2)

=== Guards ===
- Anthony Yezer, Dartmouth (AP-1)
- John Leone, Boston College (AP-1)
- Chuck Ehinger, Penn State (AP-2)
- Howie McCard, Syracuse (AP-2)

=== Center ===
- Pat Killorin, Syracuse (AP-1)
- Harry Dittmann, Navy (AP-2)

=== Placekicker ===
- Charlie Gogolak, Princeton (AP-1)

== Defense ==
=== Ends ===
- Sam Champi, Army (AP-1)
- Ed Long, Dartmouth (AP-1)
- Tom Schwartz, Army (AP-2)
- Gerry LaFountain, Buffalo (AP-2)

=== Tackles ===
- Paul Savidge, Princeton (AP-1)
- Phil Ratner, Cornell (AP-1)
- John Carber, Army (AP-2)
- E. Greenard Poles, Buffalo (AP-2)

=== Middle guard ===
- Vince Casillo, Army (AP-1)
- Bill Stetz, Boston College (AP-2)

=== Linebackers ===
- Townsend Clarke, Army (AP-1)
- Stas Maliszewski, Princeton (AP-1)
- Ray Ilg, Colgate (AP-1)
- Joe Novogratz, Pittsburgh (AP-2)
- Chris Hoch, Navy (AP-2)
- John Paske, Colgate (AP-2)

=== Backs ===
- Charlie Brown, Syracuse (AP-1)
- Dave Poe, Harvard (AP-1)
- Dick Gingrich, Penn State (AP-1)
- Barry Roach, East Stroudsburg (AP-2)
- Tom Wilson, Colgate (AP-2)
- Duncan Ingraham, Navy (AP-2)

== Key ==
- AP = Associated Press
- UPI = United Press International

== See also ==
- 1965 College Football All-America Team
