= George Webster (American football) =

American football player (1945–2007)

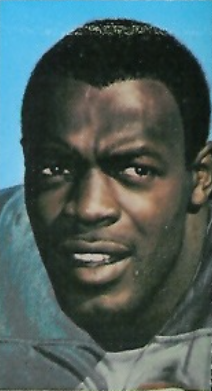
- Webster in 1969

No. 90
- Position: Linebacker

Personal information
- Born: November 25, 1945; Anderson, South Carolina, U.S.
- Died: April 19, 2007 (aged 61); Houston, Texas, U.S.
- Listed height: 6 ft 4 in (1.93 m)
- Listed weight: 255 lb (116 kg)

Career information
- High school: Westside (Anderson, South Carolina)
- College: Michigan State (1964–1966)
- NFL draft: 1967: 1st round, 5th overall pick

Career history
- Houston Oilers (1967–1972); Pittsburgh Steelers (1972–1973); New England Patriots (1974–1976)

Awards and highlights
- 3× First-team All-AFL (1967–1969); 3× AFL All-Star (1967–1969); AFL Rookie of the Year (1967); AFL All-Time Team; Unanimous All-American (1966); Consensus All-American (1965); 2× First-team All-Big Ten (1965, 1966); Michigan State Spartans No. 90 retired

Career NFL statistics
- Sacks: 14
- Interceptions: 5
- Interception yards: 67
- Fumble recoveries: 6
- Stats at Pro Football Reference
- College Football Hall of Fame

George Delano Webster (November 25, 1945 – April 19, 2007) was an American professional football player who was a linebacker in the American Football League (AFL) and National Football League (NFL) with the Houston Oilers, the Pittsburgh Steelers, and the New England Patriots. Webster played college football for the Michigan State Spartans, most notably as a defensive "roverback".

Webster was a consensus All-American as a junior in 1965, and a unanimous All-American as a senior in 1966. He was inducted into the College Football Hall of Fame in 1987. Sports Illustrated named him one of two starting safeties on its all-century college football team.

Webster was the AFL's Rookie of the Year in 1967, and was selected as an All-Star and first-team All-AFL the same year. In 1970, the Pro Football Hall of Fame named Webster to the All-Time AFL Team at linebacker; the youngest player named to that team. He was first-team All-AFL from 1967 to 1969, but suffered knee injuries in 1970 and 1971 that derailed the trajectory of his career. Pro Football Hall of Fame defensive lineman Elvin Bethea called Webster one of the greatest linebackers to ever play professional football, and a prototype for the 1960s and 1970s linebackers who could cover the entire field with his great speed. Hayes once caught and tackled Hall of Fame receiver and Olympic gold medal sprinter Bob Hayes from behind.

== Early life ==
Webster was born on November 25, 1945, in Anderson, South Carolina. He attended Westside High School in Anderson, and played on its Class AA football team at tackle and end, under coach William Roberts. During Webster's three years on the varsity football team, Westside won 33 games, losing only three; and won two state titles. He ran the 40-yard dash in 4.3 seconds, and was known as a ferocious tackler on defense.

Webster also played on Westside's varsity basketball team for three seasons. During that time, the team was 62–7, with Webster averaging 23 points and 14 rebounds per game. As a senior, he was 6 ft 4.5 in (1.94 m) and 208 lb (94.3 kg) or 6 ft 5 in (1.96 m) 218 lb (98.9 kg).

Academically, he finished third or fourth in his high school class, and was class president.

As a high school senior in 1963, Webster was highly sought after by colleges as a football player. He was recruited by Michigan State University, the University of Indiana and the University of Minnesota from the Big Ten Conference. The University of Maryland and Wake Forest University of the Atlantic Coast Conference were also interested in Webster. At a time when segregation still existed, however, neither major South Carolina university, Clemson University or the University of South Carolina, pursued Webster.

== College career ==
Webster chose to attend Michigan State University (MSU). He played on MSU's varsity football team from 1964 to 1966, as a defensive back and roverback. During those three years, the team had a record of 23–6–1; and was 19–1–1 in his final two years. As a junior (1965) and senior (1966) he became the team's "roverback", a position created by head coach Duffy Daugherty that had Webster playing as a combination of safety and linebacker. Daugherty used George Saimes as his roverback in 1962, with the hallmark of the position being the roverback's ability to make his own decisions on how to defend a play, instead of being assigned a strict role in advance. Webster himself described his role at roverback, "I was sort of a cornerback mostly". The Spartans had the top defense in college football in 1965 and 1966.

Webster was a team captain in 1965. The team had a 10–1 record, won the Big Ten Conference, and was ranked No. 2 by the Associated Press (AP) at the end of the year, behind Alabama. United Press International (UPI) ranked MSU No. 1. The Spartans only loss came in the Rose Bowl, 14–12 against UCLA. This was the only game that season in which MSU gave up two touchdowns in a single game; and it was the most points the Spartans allowed in any game that year. One UCLA touchdown came after a muffed punt gave UCLA the ball at MSU's six-yard line and the other came after UCLA recovered an onside kick. Webster recovered a fumble in the game, and the MSU defense only allowed 65 rushing yards and 147 passing yards; but the offense had three interceptions and failed on two conversion attempts after its two touchdowns.

Among Webster's Michigan State teammates was future NFL star and College Hall of Fame defensive lineman Bubba Smith, who played varsity football alongside Webster at Michigan State from 1964 to 1966. MSU’s 1965 defensive team is considered one of the best defenses in college football history. In 1965, Webster and Smith were both consensus first-team All-Americans, and were named first-team All-Big Ten, with Webster being a unanimous All-Big Ten choice. The team also included future NFL star and College Hall of Fame receiver Gene Washington, who like Smith played with Webster from 1964 to 1966.

In 1966, Webster was again a team captain. MSU finished the season 9–0–1, and was again first in the Big Ten. MSU and Notre Dame tied 10–10 on November 19, 1966, in one of college football's most renowned games (called the "Game of the Century" at the time). The game was tied with one minute to play, and Notre Dame ran out the clock rather than attempting to score. Webster told the Notre Dame players he wanted to play another half as the game was coming to a close. The Spartan defense had limited Notre Dame to 91 rushing yards and 128 passing yards, far below Notre Dame's average.

After that game, UPI ranked MSU No. 1 nationally. However, after the teams' next games, UPI ranked Notre Dame No. 1 in its final 1966 college rankings, with MSU ranked second. The coaches voting in the UPI poll awarded 329 points to the Fighting Irish and 324 to the Spartans, the closest vote in UPI ranking history at the time. The AP also ranked Notre Dame No. 1 and MSU No. 2 in its final poll. The National Football Foundation (NFF) and Helms Athletic Foundation ranked Notre Dame and MSU as tied for the No. 1 ranking in 1966. Webster led the Spartans in tackles and solo tackles in 1966, and had 10 tackles for a loss. Webster and Smith were both unanimous All-Americans in 1966, and both were named to the first-team All-Big Ten.

Webster was named the outstanding defensive player in the December 1966 East-West Shrine Game, with a fumble recovery and an interception. He played in the Hula Bowl and the Chicago College All-Star Game in 1967.

== Professional career ==
=== Houston Oilers ===
Webster was selected by the American Football League's (AFL) Houston Oilers as the fifth player overall in the first round of the 1967 NFL/AFL draft. The Oilers put Webster at linebacker, and intended to make him their starting left linebacker as soon as he came to training camp. Webster played left linebacker from the preseason onward that year. In an early September exhibition game against the Dallas Cowboys, Webster caught and tackled Cowboys' receiver "Bullet" Bob Hayes from behind. Hayes was a future Pro Football Hall of Fame receiver and an Olympic gold medal winning sprinter in the 100 meter race, who also was known as the "World's Fastest Human". Cowboys quarterback Don Meredith had completed a square-out to Hayes. Hayes thought he had broken into the open, but was brought down from behind by Webster.

In his 1967 rookie season, Webster started all 14 games at left linebacker, wearing No. 90 as he did in college. He had one interception, one fumble recovery and 1.5 quarterback sacks. Webster averaged over 10 tackles per game. He was selected to play in the 1967 AFL All-Star Game. He was named first-team All-AFL by the Associated Press, United Press International, The Sporting News, and the Newspaper Enterprise Association (NEA). The AP unanimously selected Webster as the AFL's Rookie of the Year. He also was named Rookie of the Year in the NEA's AFL coaches poll, and was UPI's Rookie of the Year.

In 1966, the Oilers were 3–11. They had the worst defense in the AFL, giving up 396 points. In 1967, the Oilers were 9–4–1, and reached the AFL championship game. The Oilers' defense was the source of the team's success, and Webster was the key to that defense. It was reported at the time, "From the day he reported to the Houston camp, Webster was the welding force of that defense as corner linebacker. At 6-5 and 225 pounds, he has both the range and the size to seal off the run and the pass. He has made an impact on the entire league". The Oilers gave up only 18 touchdowns and led the AFL in fewest points allowed, 199. Houston was the first team in AFL history to give up less than 200 points in a season.

In Webster's first professional game, on September 9, 1967, he started at left linebacker against the Kansas City Chiefs. He made 15 tackles in his first AFL game. It has also been reported he made nine tackles in that game, and was one of five players the AP considered for player of the week (the Chiefs' Bobby Bell winning that award). After the game, the Chiefs' All-AFL defensive end and future fellow member of the All-Time AFL-Team Jerry Mays walked over to Webster, offered a handshake and said "George, I just want to meet you ... You're a real fine football player".

In 1968, Webster started all 14 games at left linebacker, with one interception and two quarterback sacks. He was again chosen to play in the AFL All-Star Game, and was named first-team All-AFL by the AP, UPI, NEA, The Sporting News, Pro Football Writers of America, and Pro Football Weekly. He was selected first-team All-NFL/AFL by the Pro Football Writers and Pro Football Weekly. In 1969, he again started all 14 games at left linebacker for the Oilers, with two interceptions, one fumble recovery and 1.5 sacks. He was again an All-Star, and again named first-team All-AFL by the AP, UPI, NEA, The Sporting News and Pro Football Weekly. He was named first-team All-NFL/AFL by the Pro Football Writers, and second-team All-NFL/AFL by the Hall of Fame and NEA.

Webster's career took a downward trajectory after the 1969 season due to injuries. After three consecutive All-Star and first-team All-AFL seasons, he suffered knee injuries in 1970 and 1971 with the Oilers that limited his abilities and curtailed his speed, and led to chronic knee ailments. He first suffered cartilage and ligament damage in his left knee in an early November 1970 game against the St. Louis Cardinals, during the seventh game of the season. He underwent surgery and did not play again that season, with 2.5 sacks in his seven 1970 games. He was one of the Oilers' team captains in 1970. In 1971, he started nine games, with one sack. He missed playing time early in the 1971 season after straining ligaments in his left knee.

=== Pittsburgh Steelers and New England Patriots ===
After playing five games for the Oilers during the 1972 season, with two fumble recoveries, in late October the Oilers traded Webster to the Pittsburgh Steelers for wide receiver Dave Smith. He started in only one game for the Steelers that season. He also started only one game for the Steelers in 1973.

In August 1974, the Steelers traded Webster to the New England Patriots for a future draft choice. He started 12 games for the Patriots during the 1974 season, the most games he had started since 1969. He played left outside linebacker, and had one fumble recovery and a career-high 4.5 sacks. He started 10 games the next season, with one interception and one sack. In 1976, Webster's last season, he started three games for the Patriots, with one fumble recovery.

== Legacy and honors ==
MSU coach Duffy Daugherty considered Webster the greatest player he ever coached, and said of Webster, "He doesn't tackle people. He explodes them!" Daugherty observed that Webster had an instinct for being where the ball was, and his explosive and brutal tackling came from his ability to "uncoil at the point of impact". Webster's contributions at Michigan State are highlighted in the documentary Through the Banks of the Red Cedar, written and directed by MSU teammate Gene Washington's daughter, Maya Washington.

Webster had the ability to run with wide receivers while being strong enough to take on any running back. In winning the AFL's Rookie of the Year award in 1967, United Press International (UPI) said "Webster has the size to go through and foil the end sweeps and the speed to go downfield and cover pass receivers one-on-one". "In rating him as the best player in MSU history, a Lansing State Journal columnist wrote in 2015 that Webster "had the speed to chase down backs and the power to deliver trauma like a middle linebacker". While learning to play linebacker as a rookie in the AFL in 1967, Houston Oilers coach Wally Lemm said Webster did "a superb job covering backs coming out of the backfield with his great speed".

Teammate and Pro Football Hall of Fame defensive lineman Elvin Bethea once called Webster "one of the greatest linebackers who ever lived". Bethea said "He was the prototype linebacker in the '60s and '70s. He could cover the whole field with great speed".

In 1987, Webster was elected to the College Football Hall of Fame. In January 1970, the Pro Football Hall of Fame named him to the All-Time AFL Team. He was the youngest player named to that team. In 1999, Webster was named one of the two starting safeties on Sports Illustrated's NCAA football All-Century team. Michigan State retired Webster’s No. 90 jersey, at the time only the second number to be retired by MSU. In 2016, ESPN ranked Webster second all-time among Big Ten college safeties (only behind Jack Tatum).

On January 18, 1966, Anderson, South Carolina held George Webster Day.

== Personal life and death ==
After his playing career ended, Webster became athletic director of Gulf Coast Community Services in Houston, Texas, where he worked with underprivileged children. In 1989, he was driving an automobile when it was rear-ended by an eighteen-wheel truck, resulting in an injury that paralyzed his vocal cords. In October 1990, he was diagnosed with throat cancer.

=== Disability dispute with NFL ===
In 1989, Webster applied for benefits as totally and permanently disabled. He was found to have lost most use of a hand, foot, knee and ankle due to football-related injuries but did not meet the NFL's definition of totally disabled. In 1998, the United States Supreme Court let stand a finding by the NFL's retirement board that Webster's disability was not related to his football career. At that time, football-related disability benefits were $4,000 a month; non-football disability monthly benefits were $750.

In 2002, Webster had his right leg amputated above the knee in Houston because the limb had little circulation despite five previous surgeries. He also dealt with throat and prostate cancer in his later years. In February 2007, he had a scholarship fund established in his name, to provide opportunities for former Michigan State student athletes to return to the school to complete their degrees.

On April 19, 2007, Webster died in Houston.

== See also ==
- List of American Football League players
