= 1965 Michigan State Spartans football team =

American college football season

1965 Michigan State Spartans football

Coaches Poll national champion FWAA co-national champion NFF national champion Big Ten champion

Rose Bowl, L 12–14 vs. UCLA
- Conference: Big Ten Conference

Ranking
- Coaches: No. 1
- AP: No. 2
- Record: 10–1 (7–0 Big Ten)
- Head coach: Duffy Daugherty (12th season)
- MVP: Steve Juday
- Captains: Donald Japinga; Steve Juday
- Home stadium: Spartan Stadium

1965 Big Ten Conference football standings
	Conf.					Overall
Team	W		L		T	W		L		T
No. 2 Michigan State $	7	–	0	–	0	10	–	1	–	0
Ohio State	6	–	1	–	0	7	–	2	–	0
Purdue	5	–	2	–	0	7	–	2	–	1
Minnesota	5	–	2	–	0	5	–	4	–	1
Illinois	4	–	3	–	0	6	–	4	–	0
Northwestern	3	–	4	–	0	4	–	6	–	0
Michigan	2	–	5	–	0	4	–	6	–	0
Wisconsin	2	–	5	–	0	2	–	7	–	1
Indiana	1	–	6	–	0	2	–	8	–	0
Iowa	0	–	7	–	0	1	–	9	–	0
$ – Conference champion; Rankings from AP Poll

The 1965 Michigan State Spartans football team was an American football team that represented Michigan State University as a member of the Big Ten Conference during the 1965 Big Ten football season. In their 12th season under head coach Duffy Daugherty, the Spartans compiled a 10–1 record (7–0 in conference games), won the Big Ten championship, and outscored opponents by a total of 251 to 62. Undefeated in the regular season, the Spartans were ranked No. 1 in the final UPI coaches poll and No. 2 in the final AP writers poll, both of which were released before the bowl games. The Football Writers Association of America (FWAA) selected Michigan State and undefeated Alabama as co-national champions. The Spartans concluded the season with a 14–12 loss to No. 5 UCLA in the 1966 Rose Bowl.

Quarterback Steve Juday was selected as the team's most valuable player and finished sixth in the Heisman Trophy voting. Duffy Daugherty received multiple national coach of the year awards, and defensive back George Webster was a consensus first-team pick on the 1965 All-America college football team. A total of eight Spartans received first-team All-America honors, including defensive end Bubba Smith, linebacker Ron Goovert, middle guard Harold Lucas, and defensive back Dan Japinga. On defense, the Spartans fielded the strongest rush defense in school history, giving up an average of only 45.6 rushing yards per game and holding each of Michigan, Ohio State, and Notre Dame to negative rushing yards.

The team played its home games at Spartan Stadium in East Lansing, Michigan.

== Schedule ==
Date	Opponent	Rank	Site	Result	Attendance	Source
September 18	UCLA*		Spartan Stadium; East Lansing, MI	W 13–3	51,279	
September 25	at Penn State*		Beaver Stadium; University Park, PA (rivalry)	W 23–0	46,100	
October 2	Illinois	No. 9	Spartan Stadium; East Lansing, MI	W 22–12	71,237	
October 9	at Michigan	No. 5	Michigan Stadium; Ann Arbor, MI (rivalry)	W 24–7	103,219	
October 16	Ohio State	No. 4	Spartan Stadium; East Lansing, MI	W 32–7	75,288	
October 23	at No. 6 Purdue	No. 2	Ross–Ade Stadium; West Lafayette, IN	W 14–10	62,113	
October 30	Northwestern^{†}	No. 1	Spartan Stadium; East Lansing, MI	W 49–7	74,215	
November 6	at Iowa	No. 1	Iowa Stadium; Iowa City, IA	W 35–0	54,700	
November 13	Indiana	No. 1	Spartan Stadium; East Lansing, MI (rivalry)	W 27–13	75,280	
November 20	at No. 4 Notre Dame*	No. 1	Notre Dame Stadium; Notre Dame, IN (rivalry)	W 12–3	59,291	
January 1, 1966	vs. No. 5 UCLA*	No. 1	Rose Bowl; Pasadena, CA (Rose Bowl)	L 12–14	100,087	
*Non-conference game; ^{†}Homecoming; Rankings from AP Poll released prior to the game; Source:

== Game summaries ==
=== UCLA ===
Week 1: UCLA at Michigan State

Team	1	2	3	4	Total
UCLA	0	0	3	0	3
• Michigan State	0	10	3	0	13

- Date: September 18
- Location: East Lansing, MI
- Game attendance: 51,279

Scoring summary
2	MSU	Bob Apisa 21-yard run (Dick Kenney kick)	MSU 7–0
2	MSU	Kenney 34-yard field goal	MSU 10–0
3	UCLA	Kurt Zimmerman 37-yard field goal	MSU 10–3
3	MSU	Kenney 23-yard field goal	MSU 13–3

On September 18, Michigan State defeated UCLA in its season opener by a 13–3 score before a crowd of 51,279 at Spartan Stadium in East Lansing. The Spartans' barefoot kicker Dick Kenney scored two field goals and an extra point. Fullback Bob Apisa scored the only touchdown on a 21-yard run in the second quarter.

=== Penn State ===
Week 2: Michigan State at Penn State

Team	1	2	3	4	Total
Michigan State	0	0	0	0	0
• Penn State	3	17	0	3	23

- Date: September 25
- Location: University Park, PA
- Game attendance: 46,100

Scoring summary
1	MSU	Dick Kenney 24-yard field goal	MSU 3–0
2	MSU	Steve Juday 4-yard run (Kenney kick)	MSU 10–0
2	MSU	Bob Apisa 35-yard run (Kenney kick)	MSU 17–0
2	MSU	Kenney 29-yard field goal	MSU 20–0
4	MSU	Kenney 36-yard field goal	MSU 23–0

On September 25, Michigan State defeated Penn State by a 23–0 score before a crowd of 46,100 at Beaver Stadium in University Park, Pennsylvania. A pair of Hawaiians, fullback Bob Apisa and barefoot kicker Dick Kenney, led the Spartans to victory. Apisa tallied 81 rushing yards and a touchdown on 14 carries. Kenney set a school record with three fields goals (24, 29 and 36 yards) and also converted two extra points for a total of 11 points. Steve Juday completed 10 of 13 passes for 100 yards and also scored on a four-yard touchdown run. It was the first time Penn State was shut out at home since 1955.

=== Illinois ===
Week 3: Illinois at Michigan State

Team	1	2	3	4	Total
Illinois	7	3	2	0	12
• No. 9 Michigan State	3	6	0	13	22

- Date: October 2
- Location: East Lansing, MI
- Game attendance: 71,237

Scoring summary
1	MSU	Dick Kenney 47-yard field goal	MSU 3–0
1	ILL	Jim Grabowski 7-yard run (Custardo kick)	ILL 7–3
2	ILL	Custardo 34-yard field goal	ILL 10–3
2	MSU	Clinton Jones 13-yard run (pass failed)	ILL 10–9
3	ILL	Safety, Philips tackled in end zone	ILL 12–9
4	MSU	Bob Apisa 10-yard run (kick failed)	MSU 15–12
4	MSU	Gene Washington 8-yard pass from Steve Juday (Kenney kick)	MSU 22–12

On October 2, No.9 Michigan State defeated unranked Illinois by a 22–12 score at homecoming in East Lansing. The Spartans got off to a slow start and trailed, 12–9, at the end of three quarters. Illinois tallied on a Jim Grabowski touchdown run, a field goal, and a safety. In the fourth quarter, Michigan State rallied for two touchdowns and held the Illini scoreless. Clinton Jones tallied 89 rushing yards on 16 carries.

=== Michigan ===
Week 4: Michigan State at Michigan

Team	1	2	3	4	Total
• No. 5 Michigan State	6	3	6	9	24
Michigan	0	7	0	0	7

- Date: October 9
- Location: Ann Arbor, MI
- Game attendance: 103,219

Scoring summary
1	MSU	Steve Juday 1-yard run (kick failed)	MSU 6–0
2	MICH	Wally Gabler 1-yard run (Dick Sygar kick)	MICH 7–6
2	MSU	Dick Kenney 20-yard field goal	MSU 9–7
3	MSU	Jones 10-yard run (run failed)	MSU 15–7
4	MSU	Kenney 35-yard field goal	MSU 18–7
4	MSU	Bob Apisa 39-yard run (kick failed)	MSU 24–7

On October 9, Michigan State won its rivalry game against unranked Michigan by a 24–7 score. The game was played at Michigan Stadium before a crowd of 103,219.

Michigan State opened the scoring with a one-yard touchdown plunge by quarterback Steve Juday. Michigan responded with an 57-yard touchdown drive in the second quarter, capped by Wally Gabler's one-yard run. The Spartans added a 20-yard field goal by its barefoot kicker, Dick Kenney, and led 9–7 at halftime. Michigan State's first-half scores followed turnovers (a fumble recovery and an interception) by linebacker George Webster.

In the second half, Michigan played without its offensive stars, Jim Detwiler, Carl Ward, and Jack Clancy, each of whom sustained injuries in the game. The Spartans held the Wolverines scoreless, as the Michigan State offense added 15 points on two touchdowns (including a 39-yard run by Samoan fullback Bob Apisa) and a second field goal.

Michigan's running game limited to −38 rushing yards, including −50 yards by quarterback Dick Vidmer. With the run game stymied, Michigan turned to the air, completing 17 of 40 passes for 287 yards. The Spartans intercepted two passes and forced seven fumbles, three resulting in turnovers.

=== Ohio State ===
Week 5: Ohio State at Michigan State

Team	1	2	3	4	Total
• Ohio State	7	0	5	20	32
No. 4 Michigan State	0	0	0	7	7

- Date: October 16
- Location: East Lansing, MI
- Game attendance: 75,288

Scoring summary
1	MSU	Clinton Jones 80-yard run (Dick Kenney kick)	MSU 7–0
3	MSU	Dick Kenney 35-yard FG	MSU 10–0
3	MSU	Safety, Don Unverferth tackled by Ron Goovert in end zone	MSU 12–0
4	OSU	Fontes 36-yard pass from Unverferth (Funk kick)	MSU 12–7
4	MSU	Clinton Jones 12-yard pass from Juday (snap from center fumbled)	MSU 18–7
4	MSU	Bob Apisa 1-yard run (Kenney kick)	MSU 25–7
4	MSU	Chuck Lowther 6-yard run (Kenney kick)	MSU 32–7

On October 16, No. 4 Michigan State defeated unranked Ohio State by a 32–7 score. The game was played at Spartan Stadium in East Lansing before a crowd of 75,288. It was Woody Hayes' worst defeat in a Big Ten game. The Spartans gained 538 yards (387 rushing, 151 passing) while holding the Buckeyes to 152 yards (minus 22 rushing, 174 passing). The Buckeyes did not convert a single first down by rushing. Two Michigan State backs tallied over 100 rushing yards: Clinton Jones with 132 yards on 16 carries (including an 80-yard run in the first quarter) and Bob Apisa with 114 yards on 17 carries. Gene Washington had six receptions for 83 yards.

=== Purdue ===
Week 6: Michigan State at Purdue

Team	1	2	3	4	Total
• No. 2 Michigan State	0	0	0	14	14
No. 6 Purdue	3	7	0	0	10

- Date: October 23
- Location: West Lafayette, IN
- Game attendance: 62,113

Scoring summary
1	PUR	Bob Griese 20-yard field goal	PUR 3–0
2	PUR	Finley 7-yard pass from Griese (Griese kick)	PUR 10–0
4	MSU	Bob Apisa 1-yard run (Jones pass from Juday)	PUR 10–8
4	MSU	Clinton Jones 8-yard run (pass failed)	MSU 14–10

On October 23, No. 2 Michigan State defeated No. 6 Purdue by a 14–10 score. The game was played at West Lafayette, Indiana, before a homecoming crowd of 62,113. Purdue took a 10–0 lead in the first quarter, as Purdue quarterback Bob Griese threw for a touchdown and kicked a field goal and an extra point. The Boilermakers held the Spartans scoreless through the first three quarters, but the Spartan defense held Purdue scoreless in the second half. Griese, who completed 13 of 23 passes for 113 yards in the first half, completed only two of ten passes in the second half. The Spartans scored two touchdowns in the fourth quarter for a come-from-behind victory.

=== Northwestern ===
Week 7: Northwestern at Michigan State

Team	1	2	3	4	Total
Northwestern	7	0	0	0	7
• No. 1 Michigan State	6	15	21	7	49

- Date: October 30
- Location: East Lansing, MI
- Game attendance: 74,215

Scoring summary
1	NW	Gates fumble recovery in end zone (Dickie kick)	NW 7–0
1	MSU	Bob Apisa 1-yard run (run failed)	NW 7–6
2	MSU	Clinton Jones 4-yard run (Apisa run)	MSU 14–7
2	MSU	Apisa 2-yard run (Dick Kenney kick)	MSU 21–7
3	MSU	Apisa 1-yard run (Kenney kick)	MSU 28–7
3	MSU	Jones, 10-yard pass from Steve Juday (Kenney kick)	MSU 35–7
3	MSU	Dwight Lee 1-yard run (Kenney kick)	MSU 42–7
4	MSU	Jim Raye 46-yard run (Kenney kick)	MSU 49–7

On October 30, Michigan State defeated unranked Northwestern by a 49–7 score before a homecoming crowd of 74,215 in East Lansing. Prior to the game, the Spartans were elevated to No. 1 in the AP poll. Their tally of 49 points was the highest by a Michigan State team since 1957. Fullback Bob Apisa ran for three touchdowns and a two-point conversion; his 20 point tied the school scoring record in a Big Ten game. Halfback Clinton Jones also scored two touchdowns. The Spartans gained 322 rushing yards, led by Jones and backup quarterback Jim Raye 99 yards each and Apisa with 76 yards. Quarterback Steve Juday completed nine of 17 passes for 126 yards. On defense, the Spartan held Northwestern to a net of seven rushing yards and 79 passing yards.

=== Iowa ===
Week 8: Michigan State at Iowa

Team	1	2	3	4	Total
• No. 1 Michigan State	0	14	7	14	35
Iowa	0	0	0	0	0

- Date: November 6
- Location: Iowa City, IA
- Game attendance: 54,700

Scoring summary
2	MSU	Clinton Jones 19-yard run (Dick Kenney kick)	MSU 7–0
2	MSU	Jones 6-yard run (Kenney kick)	MSU 14–0
3	MSU	Jones 2-yard run (Kenney kick)	MSU 21–0
4	MSU	Jones 4-yard run (Kenney kick)	MSU 28–0
4	MSU	Lee 14-yard run (Kenney kick)	MSU 35–0

On November 6, No. 1 Michigan State defeated unranked Iowa, 35–0, in East Lansing. Halfback Clinton Jones rushed for 53 yards on 14 carries and scored four touchdowns; he became the second Michigan State player to tally four touchdowns in a game. (Bud Crane was the first, doing so in 1947.) The Spartans tallied 434 yards of offense with 318 rushing yards and 116 passing yards. Defensive end Bubba Smith knocked down several passes and blocked a punt to set up the Spartans' second touchdown.

=== Indiana ===
Week 9: Indiana at Michigan State

Team	1	2	3	4	Total
Indiana	0	7	6	0	13
• No. 1 Michigan State	3	7	0	17	27

- Date: November 13
- Location: East Lansing, MI
- Game attendance: 75,280

Scoring summary
1	MSU	Dick Kenney 21-yard FG	MSU 3–0
2	MSU	Gene Washington 27-yard pass from Steve Juday (Kenney kick)	MSU 10–0
2	IND	Bill Malinchak 10-yard pass from Frank Stavroff (kick failed)	MSU 10–6
2	IND	Stavroff 1-yard run (kick failed)	IND 13–10
4	MSU	Washington 43-yard pass from Juday (Kenney kick)	MSU 17–13
4	MSU	Kenney 27-yard field goal	MSU 20–13
3	MSU	Washington 4-yard pass from Juday (Kenney kick)	MSU 27–13

On November 13, No 1 Michigan State defeated unranked Indiana by a 27–13 score before a crowd at 75,280 at Spartan Stadium in East Lansing. Indiana led, 13–10, at the end of the third quarter. Michigan State scored three times in the fourth quarter (two touchdowns and a field goal) to win by a 27–13 score. Gene Washington caught the game-winning touchdown pass with only 13 seconds remaining in the game. Washington caught six passes for 112 yards and set a Michigan State record with three touchdown receptions. The Spartans out-gained the Hoosiers by a total of 344 yards to 238 yards. Halfback Dwight Lee gained 103 rushing yards on 23 carries, and Steve Juday completed 11 of 22 passes for 150 yards. With the victory, Michigan State won its first undisputed Big Ten championship since 1953.

=== Notre Dame ===
Week 10: Michigan State at Notre Dame

Team	1	2	3	4	Total
• No. 1 Michigan State	0	0	6	6	12
No. 4 Notre Dame	3	0	0	0	3

- Date: November 20
- Location: Notre Dame, IN
- Game attendance: 59,291

Scoring summary
1	ND	Ken Ivan 32-yard FG	ND 3–0
3	MSU	Clint Jones 3-yard run (kick failed)	MSU 6–3
4	MSU	Dwight Lee 19-yard pass from Steve Juday (pass failed)	MSU 12–3

On November 20, Michigan State capped an undefeated regular season with a 12–3 victory over No. 4 Notre Dame before a crowd of 59,291 at Notre Dame. The Spartans' defense held Notre Dame to negative 12 yards of total offense, including minus 36 yards rushing. Notre Dame kicked a field goal in the first quarter after recovering a Michigan State fumble at the 19-yard line. On offense, the Spartans tallied 215 rushing yards and 71 passing yards. Clint Jones led the team with 117 rushing yards on 20 carries, including a three-yard touchdown run that put the Spartans in the lead.

=== UCLA—Rose Bowl ===
Michigan State vs. UCLA

Team	1	2	3	4	Total
No. 1 Michigan State	0	0	0	12	12
• No. 5 UCLA	0	14	0	0	14

- Date: January 1, 1966
- Location: Pasadena, CA
- Game attendance: 100,087

Scoring summary
2	UCLA	Gary Beban 1-yard run (Zimmerman kick)	UCLA 7–0
2	UCLA	Beban 1-yard run (Zimmerman kick)	UCLA 14–0
4	MSU	Bob Apisa 38-yard run (pass failed)	UCLA 14–12
4	UCLA	Steve Juday 1-yard run (run failed)	UCLA 14–12

On January 1, 1966, No. 1 Michigan State lost, 14–12, to No. 5 UCLA before a crowd of 100,087 in the 1966 Rose Bowl game in Pasadena, California. UCLA took a 14–0 lead on two one-yard touchdown runs by Gary Beban early in the second quarter. UCLA's first touchdown followed a fumbled point that was recovered by the Bruins at the Michigan State seven-yard line. After their first touchdown, the Bruins recovered an on-side kick to set up their second score. The Spartans' comeback effort in the fourth quarter netted two touchdowns, but fell short as two attempts at two-point conversion failed. Quarterback Steve Juday scored the second touchdown with 31 seconds remaining in the game, but Bob Apisa was stopped short of the goal-line on his run for a two-point conversion. The Spartans out-gained the Bruins by 314 yards to 212 yards.

== Personnel ==
=== Roster ===
1965 Michigan State Spartans football team roster
Players
Coaches
Offense

Pos.	#	Name	Class
QB	23	Steve Juday
HB	26	Clinton Jones
HB	34	Dwight Lee
FB	44	Eddie Cotton
FB	45	Bob Apisa
C	50	Boris Dimitroff
OT	57	Joe Przybycki
G	58	John Karpinski
G	63	Norm Jenkins
OT	67	Jerry West
E	80	Jim Proebstle
E	84	Gene Washington

Defense

Pos.	#	Name	Class
DB	14	Don Japinga
DB	20	Jim Summers
DB	29	J. Jones
S	38	Jess Phillips
MG	51	Harold Lucas
DT	53	Buddy Owens
LB	61	Ron Goovert
DT	65	Don Bierowicz
LB	71	Charles Thornhill
DE	85	Bob Viney
Rover	90	George Webster
DE	95	Bubba Smith

Special teams

Pos.	#	Name	Class
PK		Dick Kenney

== Statistics ==
=== Team statistics ===
On offense, the Spartans gained 2,369 rushing yards (236.9 yards game) and 1,186 passing yards (118.6 yards per game). On defense, they held opponents to only 456 rushing yards (45.6 yards per game) and 1,243 passing yards (124.3 yards per game). Outstanding single-game accomplishments on defense included:

- The Spartans held Notre Dame to minus 12 yards of total offense, a figure that remains the third best defensive performance by a Michigan State team. They gave up only three first downs in the game.
- They did not allow Ohio State to convert a first down by rushing. The Buckeyes were limited to negative 22 rushing yards in the game. The 32–7 margin was Ohio State's worst defeat in a Big Ten game during the Woody Hayes era.
- In a 24–7 victory over rival Michigan, the Spartans held the Wolverines to minus 39 rushing yards.

=== Individual statistics ===
Quarterback Steve Juday completed 89 of 168 passes for 1,173 passing yards, seven touchdowns, seven interceptions, and a 117.0 quarterback rating. He also rushed for 170 yards for a team-high 1,343 yards of total offense.

Halfback Clinton Jones led the team in rushing with 788 yards on 164 carries for an average of 4.8 yards per carry. He also led the team in scoring with 72 points on 12 touchdowns. He was also the team's No. 2 receiver with 26 catches for 308 yards.

The team's other top rushers were fullback Bob Apisa with 666 yards and Dwight Lee with 405 yards.

End Gene Washington led the team 40 receptions and 638 receiving yards.

== Awards and honors ==
Steve Juday. Senior quarterback Steve Juday from Northville, Michigan, was a team co-captain (sharing the honor with Don Japinga) and received the Governor of Michigan Award as the most valuable player on the 1965 Michigan State football team. He also finished sixth in the 1965 voting for the Heisman Trophy. He was also selected by the Associated Press as the first-team quarterback on its 1965 All-America football team. Juday was also named as a winner of the 1965 Scholar-Athlete Award by the National Football Foundation, and won the Big Ten Medal of Honor as the Michigan State male athlete with the most outstanding athletic and academic achievement. He closed his collegiate career as Michigan State's all-time leader in passing yardage and touchdown passes, and was inducted into the Michigan State Athletic Hall of Fame in 2016.

George Webster. Junior George Webster of Anderson, South Carolina, led the team on defense, playing at what was variously referred to as defensive back, linebacker, or "roverback". He was a consensus first-team pick on the 1965 All-America college football team. He received first-team honors from the American Football Coaches Association (AFCA), Associated Press (AP), Newspaper Enterprise Association (NEA), United Press International (UPI), and Football News (FN). In January 1966, the mayor of his hometown (Anderson, South Carolina) proclaimed "George Webster Day" with a motorcade through downtown and ceremonies at city Hall.

Duffy Daugherty. In late December 1965, the FWAA selected Daugherty as the winner of its National Football Coach of the Year award. He also won the Eddie Robinson Coach of the Year Award and The Sporting News College Football Coach of the Year award in 1965. He had previously won Coach of the Year honors in 1955.

All-America honors. Eight Michigan State players received first-team All-America honors. In addition to Webster and Juday, the other honorees were: defensive end Bubba Smith (AFCA, UPI); end Gene Washington (CP, FN); halfback Clinton Jones (FWAA); linebacker Ron Goovert (FWAA); middle guard Harold Lucas (NEA); and fullback Bob Apisa (FN).

All-Big Ten honors. Eleven Spartans received first- or second-team honors from the Associated Press (AP) or United Press International (UPI) on their 1965 All-Big Ten Conference football teams: Webster at defensive back (AP-1, UPI-1); running back Clinton Jones (AP-1, UPI-1); end Gene Washington (AP-1, UPI-1); defensive end Bubba Smith (AP-1, UPI-1); quarterback Steve Juday (AP-1, UPI-2); defensive guard Harold Lucas (AP-2, UPI-1); linebacker Ron Goovert (AP-1, UPI-2); defensive back Don Japinga (AP-2, UPI-1); fullback Bob Apisa (AP-2, UPI-2); offensive guard John Karpinski (AP-2); and offensive tackle Jerry West (UPI-2).

College Football Hall of Fame. Five members of the 1965 team were later inducted into the College Football Hall of Fame: head coach Duffy Daugherty in 1984; defensive back George Webster in 1987; defensive end Bubba Smith in 1988; wide receiver Gene Washington in 2011; and running back Clinton Jones in 2015.

Team awards. At the team banquet in late November 1965, awards were presented to Harold Lucas as the Detroit area player contributing most to the team; Steve Juday as most valuable player and the player best combining athletic and academic ability; Jim Proebstle the president's award for perseverance; Dan Japinga the award for dedication; George Webster as outstanding defensive back; Ron Goovert as the outstanding defensive lineman; Clint Jones as outstanding offensive back; Gene Washington as outstanding end; and Bob Viney the Biggie Munn Award as the most improved player.

In addition, the 1965 and 1966 teams were inducted into the Michigan State Athletics Hall of Fame in 2024. Several players from the teams have also been inducted, including Bob Apisa, Clinton Jones, Steve Juday, Jimmy Ray, Bubba Smith, Gene Washington, and George Webster.
