= Gene Washington =

Gene Washington may refer to:

- Gene Washington (American football, born 1944), NFL wide receiver for the Minnesota Vikings
- Gene Washington (American football, born 1947), NFL wide receiver for the San Francisco 49ers
