= Clinton Jones (American football) =

American football player (born 1945)

No. 26
- Position: Running back

Personal information
- Born: May 24, 1945 (age 81); Cleveland, Ohio, U.S.
- Listed height: 6 ft 0 in (1.83 m)
- Listed weight: 206 lb (93 kg)

Career information
- High school: Cathedral Latin (Chardon, Ohio)
- College: Michigan State (1964–1966)
- NFL draft: 1967: 1st round, 2nd overall pick

Career history
- Minnesota Vikings (1967–1972); San Diego Chargers (1973)

Awards and highlights
- NFL champion (1969); 2× National champion (1965, 1966); Consensus All-American (1966); Second-team All-American (1965); 2× First-team All-Big Ten (1965, 1966); Michigan State Spartans No. 26 retired

Career NFL statistics
- Rushing yards: 2,178
- Rushing average: 3.6
- Receptions: 38
- Receiving yards: 431
- Kick return yards: 2,426
- Total touchdowns: 21
- Stats at Pro Football Reference
- College Football Hall of Fame

Clinton Jones (born May 24, 1945) is an American former professional football player who was a running back in the National Football League (NFL) for the Minnesota Vikings and the San Diego Chargers. He played college football for the Michigan State Spartans and was selected by the Vikings in the first round (2nd overall) of the 1967 NFL/AFL draft.

== Early life ==
Clinton Jones was born on May 24, 1945, in Cleveland, Ohio. He attended Notre Dame-Cathedral Latin School in Chardon, Ohio.

== College career ==
After his graduation from Cathedral Latin School, Jones spent his college years at Michigan State University. He finished sixth in voting for the 1966 Heisman Award, the Michigan State Spartans second year in a row as national champions. He is featured in the documentary Through the Banks of the Red Cedar, written and directed by Gene Washington's daughter, Maya Washington.

== NFL career ==
Jones was drafted in the first round with the second overall pick by the Minnesota Vikings in the 1967 NFL/AFL draft. The pick used to draft Jones was one received by the Vikings from the New York Giants in exchange for the quarterback Fran Tarkenton.

Jones spent six seasons, 1967 to 1972, with Minnesota before moving on to the San Diego Chargers for one last season in 1973.

Clint Jones is a member of The Pigskin Club Of Washington, D.C., and National Intercollegiate All-American Football Players Honor Roll.

On January 9, 2015, Jones was named to the College Football Hall Of Fame.

== Career statistics ==
=== NFL ===
Legend
| | Won the NFL championship |
| | Led the league |
| **Bold** | Career high |

==== Regular season ====
| Year | Team | Games | | Rushing | | | | | Receiving | | | | |
| Year | Team | GP | GS | Att | Yds | Avg | Lng | TD | Rec | Yds | Avg | Lng | TD |
|---|---|---|---|---|---|---|---|---|---|---|---|---|---|
| 1967 | MIN | 14 | 0 | 13 | 23 | 1.8 | 9 | 0 | 0 | 0 | 0.0 | 0 | 0 |
| 1968 | MIN | 12 | 12 | 128 | 536 | 4.2 | 43 | 1 | 4 | 26 | 6.5 | 14 | 0 |
| 1969 | MIN | 14 | 2 | 54 | 241 | **4.5** | **80** | 3 | 3 | 23 | 7.7 | 9 | 0 |
| 1970 | MIN | 14 | 7 | 120 | 369 | 3.1 | 23 | **9** | **9** | 117 | 13.0 | **72** | 0 |
| 1971 | MIN | 14 | 10 | **180** | **675** | 3.8 | 73 | 4 | **9** | 98 | 10.9 | 18 | 0 |
| 1972 | MIN | 7 | 3 | 52 | 164 | 3.2 | 33 | 2 | 6 | 42 | 7.0 | 10 | 0 |
| 1973 | SDG | 12 | 3 | 55 | 170 | 3.1 | 38 | 1 | 7 | **125** | **17.9** | 37 | 0 |
| | | 87 | 37 | 602 | 2,178 | 3.6 | 80 | 20 | 38 | 431 | 11.3 | 72 | 0 |

==== Playoffs ====
| Year | Team | Games | | Rushing | | | | | Receiving | | | | |
| Year | Team | GP | GS | Att | Yds | Avg | Lng | TD | Rec | Yds | Avg | Lng | TD |
|---|---|---|---|---|---|---|---|---|---|---|---|---|---|
| 1968 | MIN | 1 | 0 | 2 | 0 | 0.0 | 0 | 0 | 0 | 0 | 0.0 | 0 | 0 |
| 1969 | MIN | 3 | 0 | 2 | 7 | 3.5 | 6 | 0 | 0 | 0 | 0.0 | 0 | 0 |
| 1970 | MIN | 1 | 1 | **15** | **60** | **4.0** | **12** | 0 | **1** | **5** | **5.0** | **5** | 0 |
| 1971 | MIN | 1 | 1 | **15** | 52 | 3.5 | 11 | 0 | 0 | 0 | 0.0 | 0 | 0 |
| | | 6 | 2 | 34 | 119 | 3.5 | 12 | 0 | 1 | 5 | 5.0 | 5 | 0 |

=== College ===
- 1964: 72 carries for 350 yards and one touchdown. 1 catch for 15 yards and one touchdown.
- 1965: 185 carries for 900 yards and 10 TD. 27 catches for 314 yards and 2 TD.
- 1966: 159 carries for 784 yards and 6 TD. 6 catches for 85 yards.

== Later life ==
He was one of the fifteen plaintiffs in Mackey v. National Football League in which Judge Earl R. Larson declared that the Rozelle rule was a violation of antitrust laws on December 30, 1975.
