= Bubba Smith =

American actor and athlete (1945–2011)

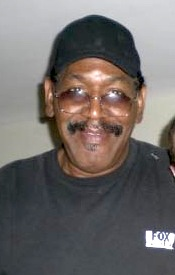
- Smith in 2009

No. 78, 77
- Position: Defensive end

Personal information
- Born: February 28, 1945; Orange, Texas, U.S.
- Died: August 3, 2011 (aged 66); Los Angeles, California, U.S.
- Listed height: 6 ft 7 in (2.01 m)
- Listed weight: 265 lb (120 kg)

Career information
- High school: Charlton-Pollard (Beaumont, Texas)
- College: Michigan State (1964–1966)
- NFL draft: 1967: 1st round, 1st overall pick

Career history
- Baltimore Colts (1967–1972); Oakland Raiders (1973–1974); Houston Oilers (1975–1976)

Awards and highlights
- Super Bowl champion (V); NFL champion (1968); First-team All-Pro (1971); Second-team All-Pro (1968); 2× Pro Bowl (1970, 1971); UPI Lineman of the Year (1966); Unanimous All-American (1966); Consensus All-American (1965); 2× First-team All-Big Ten (1965, 1966); Second-team AP All-Time All-American (2025); Michigan State Spartans No. 95 retired

Career NFL statistics
- Fumble recoveries: 4
- Stats at Pro Football Reference
- College Football Hall of Fame

Charles Aaron "Bubba" Smith (February 28, 1945 – August 3, 2011) was an American professional football defensive end and actor. Smith played in the National Football League (NFL) for the Baltimore Colts, Oakland Raiders, and Houston Oilers.

Smith played college football for the Michigan State Spartans, where he twice earned All-American honors. Smith had a major role in a 10–10 tie against Notre Dame in 1966 that was billed as "The Game of the Century". He is one of only six players to have his jersey number retired by the program. He was inducted into the College Football Hall of Fame in 1988.

The first overall pick of the 1967 NFL/AFL draft, Smith played ten years in the NFL for the Colts, Raiders, and Oilers from 1967 to 1976. He was the Colts' starting left defensive end for five seasons, playing in Super Bowls III and V. He was named to two Pro Bowls and was a first-team All-Pro in 1971. He had tremendous quickness despite being 6 ft 7 in (2.01 m) and 265 pounds (120 kg), a combination which usually earned him a double-team.

During his acting career, Smith specialized in comedic roles in film, television, and television advertising. For about a decade following his retirement from football, he appeared in various commercials for Miller Lite, alongside Chicago Bears linebacker Dick Butkus. His best-known role was as Moses Hightower in the first six Police Academy movies.

Smith was posthumously diagnosed with chronic traumatic encephalopathy, a neurological condition generally related to head trauma. He is one of at least 345 NFL players to be diagnosed after death with this disease.

== Early life ==
Smith was born on February 28, 1945, in Orange, Texas, to Willie Ray Smith Sr. and Georgia Oreatha Curl Smith, and raised in nearby Beaumont. His father, Willie Ray Smith Sr., was a football coach who earned 235 victories at three high schools in the Beaumont area. Bubba had the opportunity to play for his father at Charlton-Pollard High School in Beaumont. He developed into one of the state's best-ever high school football players. Smith's younger brother Tody Smith played collegiately for the University of Southern California, and professionally for the Dallas Cowboys, Houston Oilers, and Buffalo Bills.

== Football career ==
=== College ===
Smith originally had hopes of playing college football at the University of Texas. Even though Longhorns head coach Darrell Royal regarded him as worthy of an athletic scholarship, Royal was unwilling to offer one in the face of racial segregation which prevailed throughout the southern United States at the time. Texas was then a member of the Southwest Conference (SWC), which began to integrate in 1967. The university's football program lagged behind, before acquiescing in 1970.

The situation at UT motivated Smith to become a much better player at Michigan State University, where he was an All-American in both 1965 and 1966. He was a popular athlete at Michigan State, earning the arresting fan chant of "Kill, Bubba, Kill."

His final game at Michigan State was a 10–10 tie with Notre Dame at Spartan Stadium on November 19, 1966. With both teams undefeated, untied and ranked atop the national polls going in (The Fighting Irish were ranked #1 at 8–0–0, the Spartans #2 at 9–0–0), the match-up was hyped as the college "Game of the Century". Early in the first quarter, Smith tackled Notre Dame starting quarterback Terry Hanratty, who sustained a separated left shoulder. Hanratty was replaced for the remainder of the game by Coley O'Brien. Smith, who admitted that Hanratty's injury actually backfired on the Spartans, stated, "That didn't help us any. It just let them put in that O'Brien who's slippery and faster and gave us more trouble. The other guy just sits there and waits, and that's what we wanted." Michigan State finished second behind Notre Dame in the final voting for the national championship.

In 1988, Smith was enshrined in the College Football Hall of Fame. Michigan State retired his number 95 jersey on September 23, 2006, prior to the Spartans' home game against Notre Dame, amid repeated cheers of his old slogan from the student section. This game also celebrated the 40th anniversary of the "Game of the Century."

In 1999, Sports Illustrated included him on its All-Century Team for college football.

=== Professional ===
Smith was the first overall pick in the 1967 NFL draft, taken by the Baltimore Colts with a selection originally held by the expansion New Orleans Saints, which had been traded for quarterback Gary Cuozzo. Smith's Michigan State teammate, running back Clint Jones, followed him as the second pick. As of 2022, Smith is the only Michigan State player to be taken first overall.

Smith spent ten seasons in the NFL as a defensive end and played in the Super Bowl twice in his first five seasons. The heavily-favored Colts lost Super Bowl III to the New York Jets and won Super Bowl V two years later following the 1970 season. It was Smith's only Super Bowl ring. However, in interviews, Smith stated that he would never wear the ring, out of a sense of disappointment that he and his teammates were unable to win Super Bowl III.

Smith was injured at Tampa Stadium in the 1972 preseason, when he ran into a solid steel pole the NFL was using at the time to mark yardage and missed the season. He filed a lawsuit against the Tampa Sports Authority and the NFL for $2.5 million. Smith contended the referees mishandled the markers, creating "an undue hazard". The court battle lasted six years before ending in a mistrial.

Smith was traded from the Colts to the Oakland Raiders for Raymond Chester on July 16, 1973. He finished his career with the Houston Oilers. Smith was selected All-Pro one year, All-Conference two years, and went to two Pro Bowls. His legacy is the inspiration behind the documentary, Through the Banks of the Red Cedar, written and directed by MSU teammate Gene Washington's daughter, Maya.

== Acting career ==
After retiring from professional football, Smith began acting in small movie and television roles in the late 1970s and early 1980s. He is perhaps best known for his role as Moses Hightower in the Police Academy movie series, a role he reprised in all but one of the Police Academy sequels. He also played as the chauffeur for Ned Beatty's character, Clyde Torkle, in the movie Stroker Ace starring Burt Reynolds.

Smith starred in the short-lived television series Blue Thunder, partnering with Pro Football Hall of Fame defensive star Dick Butkus, with whom he frequently costarred in advertisements for Miller Lite beer. Among other television series Smith appeared in were Good Times, Half Nelson, The Odd Couple, Wonder Woman, Taxi, Who’s the Boss?, Hart to Hart, MacGyver, Married... with Children, Family Matters and Open All Night.

Smith was the longtime spokesman of Baltimore-area law firm Cohen, Snyder, Eisenberg & Katzenberg.

== Personal life ==
In 1983, Smith published the autobiography entitled Kill, Bubba, Kill, in which he stated he felt it was possible Super Bowl III had been rigged to enable the Jets to win in order to ensure the AFL–NFL merger proceeded smoothly.

Smith was found dead in his Los Angeles home by his caretaker on August 3, 2011. He died of acute drug intoxication and heart disease. Phentermine, a weight-loss drug, was found in his system. His heart weighed more than twice that of an average similar male. He was 66 years old.

=== CTE diagnosis ===
On May 24, 2016, it was announced that Smith had the brain disease chronic traumatic encephalopathy (CTE), a neurodegenerative illness affecting unknown numbers of former athletes in contact sports. The findings were confirmed by researchers affiliated with the Department of Veterans Affairs, Boston University and the Concussion Legacy Foundation, and released with the permission of the executor of Smith's estate.

Smith is the 90th former NFL player found to have had CTE by the researchers at the Boston University brain bank; they have examined 94 former pro players. According to the Concussion Legacy Foundation, on a scale of 1 to 4 used by the neuropathologist who examined Smith's brain, Smith had Stage 3 CTE, with symptoms including cognitive impairment and problems with judgment and planning.

== Filmography ==
Year	Title	Role	Notes
1973	The Odd Couple	Himself	TV series, Season 3, Episode 22 "Take My Furniture, Please"
1978	Superdome	Moses Gordine	TV movie
1978	Wonder Woman	Rojak	TV series, Season 2, Episode 13 "Light-fingered Lady"
1979	A Pleasure Doing Business	Joe Marsh	
1980	Vega$	Peter Bridges	Episode "A Deadly Victim"
1981-1982	Open All Night	Robin	recurring role as night manager
1981	Escape from DS-3	Mac	
1982	Taxi	Lucius Franklin	
1983	Stroker Ace	Arnold	
1984	Police Academy	Cadet Moses Hightower	
1984	Blue Thunder	Lyman "Bubba" Kelsey	TV series, 11 episodes
1985	Police Academy 2: Their First Assignment	Officer Moses Hightower	
1986	Black Moon Rising	Agent Johnson	
1986	Police Academy 3: Back in Training	Sergeant Moses Hightower	
1987	Police Academy 4: Citizens on Patrol	Sergeant Moses Hightower	
1987	The Wild Pair	Benny Avalon	
1988	Police Academy 5: Assignment Miami Beach	Sergeant / Lieutenant Moses Hightower	
1989	Police Academy 6: City Under Siege	Sergeant / Lieutenant Moses Hightower	
1990	Gremlins 2: The New Batch	Himself	
1991	Married... with Children	"Spare Tire" Dixon	TV series, Season 5, Episode 16 "All Night Security Dude"
1991	MacGyver (1985 TV series)	Bailey	Season 7, Episode 10 "Split Decision"
1991	Who's the Boss?	Himself	Season 8, Episode 8 "Death And Love: Part 2"
1992	My Samurai	Reverend George	
1992	The Naked Truth	Cop	
1992	Coach	Himself	Season 5 episode 8: "The Bachelor Party"
1993	Fist of Honor	Detective Johnson	
1993	Family Matters	Bones	Season 5 episode 5: "Money Out the Window"
1994	The Silence of the Hams	Olaf	
1994	Married... with Children	Himself	Season 9 episode 10: "Dud Bowl"
1995	Drifting School	Peter Jackson	
1997	Sabrina the Teenage Witch (1996 TV series)	Security Guard	Season 1 Episode 15: “Hilda and Zelda: the Teenage Years”
2000	Down 'n Dirty	Detective Jerry Cale	
2000	The Flunky	Himself	
2004	The Coach	Hulk Referee	Short
2004	Full Clip	Sleepy	
2008	Breaking the Huddle: The Integration of College Football	Himself	TV movie
2010	Blood River	Harold	
2016	DaZe: Vol. Too [sic] - NonSeNse	Himself	(final film role)

== See also ==
- List of Pro Football Hall of Fame inductees
- List of NFL players with chronic traumatic encephalopathy
