= Harry Jones (American football) =

American football player (1945–2016)

- Jones in 1972

No. 23
- Position: Running back

Personal information
- Born: July 25, 1945; Huntington, West Virginia, U.S.
- Died: December 11, 2016 (aged 71); Springfield, Arkansas, U.S.
- Listed height: 6 ft 2 in (1.88 m)
- Listed weight: 205 lb (93 kg)

Career information
- High school: Enid (Enid, Oklahoma)
- College: Arkansas (1963-1966)
- NFL draft: 1967: 1st round, 19th overall pick

Career history
- Philadelphia Eagles (1967–1970)

Awards and highlights
- National champion (1964); Second-team All-American (1965); First-team All-SWC (1965)

Career NFL statistics
- Rushing yards: 85
- Rushing average: 1.9
- Receptions: 9
- Receiving yards: 131
- Stats at Pro Football Reference

Harry Lee "Light Horse" Jones (July 25, 1945 – December 11, 2016) was an American professional football player who was a running back in the National Football League (NFL). He was a first-round selection (19th overall pick) by the Philadelphia Eagles in the 1967 NFL/AFL draft, and played from 1967 to 1970 for the Eagles. He played college football for the Arkansas Razorbacks.

== Playing career ==
=== College ===
Jones played college football for the Arkansas Razorbacks. In 1965, Jones set a then-school record for rushing yards in a game with 293 yards. He also led the nation in yards per rush in 1965. In 1966, he was an All-American.

=== Professional ===
Jones was selected by the Philadelphia Eagles in the first round (19th overall) of the 1967 NFL/AFL draft. He was signed by the team on July 6, 1967. He was waived on August 2, 1971. Jones tried to make the team again in the 1972 training camp, but was cut on August 8. He played running back, wide receiver and defensive end for the Eagles during his career.

== Coaching career ==
=== University of Pittsburgh ===
Jones was hired by the Pittsburgh Panthers as an assistant football coach under Johnny Majors on January 21, 1973. In 1975, Jones coached future College Football Hall of Fame and Pro Football Hall of Fame running back Tony Dorsett.
