= Walt Barnes (defensive lineman) =

American football player (born 1944)

No. 77, 73
- Position: Defensive lineman

Personal information
- Born: January 19, 1944 (age 82); Chicago, Illinois, U.S.
- Listed height: 6 ft 3 in (1.91 m)
- Listed weight: 245 lb (111 kg)

Career information
- High school: St. Mel (Chicago)
- College: Nebraska (1962–1965)
- NFL draft: 1966: 2nd round, 21st overall pick
- AFL draft: 1966: 3rd round, 23rd overall pick

Career history
- Washington Redskins (1966–1968); Denver Broncos (1969–1971)

Awards and highlights
- Consensus All-American (1965); 2× First-team All-Big Eight (1964, 1965)

Career NFL/AFL statistics
- Fumble recoveries: 1
- Sacks: 5
- Stats at Pro Football Reference

Walter Charles Barnes (born January 19, 1944) is an American former professional football player who was a defensive lineman in the National Football League (NFL) for the Washington Redskins and the Denver Broncos. He played college football for the Nebraska Cornhuskers, earning consensus All-American honors in 1965. Barnes was selected in the second round of the 1966 NFL draft and was also chosen in the third round of the 1966 AFL draft by the Kansas City Chiefs. He played professionally in the American Football League (AFL) for the Denver Broncos in 1969. He attended the University of Nebraska–Lincoln.

== See also ==
- List of American Football League players
