= 1965 All-Southwest Conference football team =

American college football all-star team

The 1965 All-Southwest Conference football team consists of American football players chosen by various organizations for All-Southwest Conference teams for the 1965 NCAA University Division football season. The selectors for the 1965 season included the Associated Press (AP).

== All Southwest selections ==
=== Offense ===
==== Backs ====
- Donny Anderson, Texas Tech (AP-1)
- Bobby Burnett, Arkansas (AP-1)
- Tom Wilson, Texas Tech (AP-1)
- Harry Jones, Arkansas (AP-1)
- Jon Brittenum, Arkansas (AP-1)

==== Ends ====
- Bobby Crockett, Arkansas (AP-1)
- Pete Lammons, Texas (AP-1)

==== Tackles ====
- Glen Ray Hines, Arkansas (AP-1)
- Jim Vining, Rice (AP-1)

==== Guards ====
- Lynn Thornhill, SMU (AP-1)
- Frank Bedrick, Texas (AP-1)

==== Centers ====
- Jack Howe, Texas (AP-1)

=== Defense ===
==== Defensive ends ====
- Doug January, SMU (AP-1)
- Jack Brasuell, Arkansas (AP-1)
- Bobby Roper, Arkansas (AP-1 [P])

==== Defensive tackles ====
- Loyd Phillips, Arkansas (AP-1)
- Jim Williams, Arkansas (AP-1)

==== Linebackers ====
- Tommy Nobis, Texas (AP-1)
- John LaGrone, SMU (AP-1)
- Diron Talbert, Texas (AP-1)

==== Defensive backs ====
- Frank Horak, TCU (AP-1)
- Ronnie Reel, SMU (AP-1)
- Tommy Trantham, Arkansas (AP-1)

== Key ==
AP = Associated Press

== See also ==
- 1965 College Football All-America Team
