= Tommy Nobis =

American football player (1943–2017)

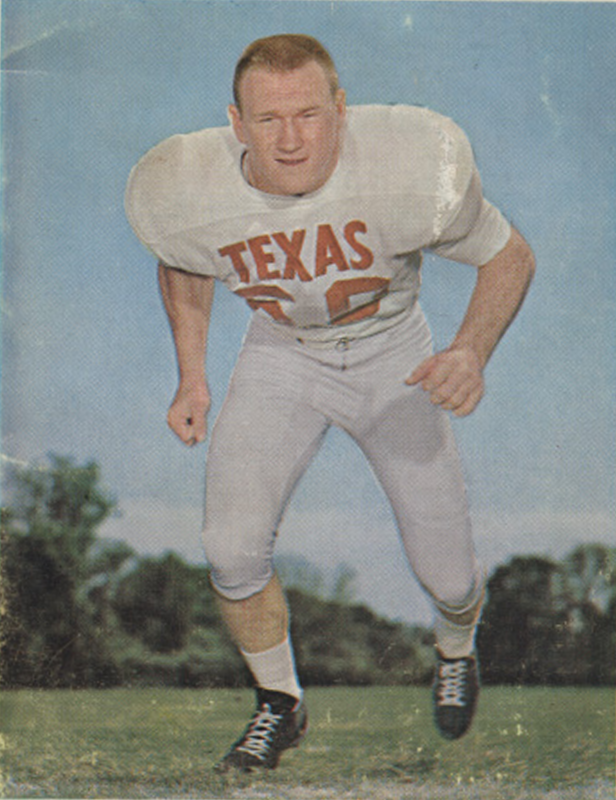
- Nobis, c. 1964

No. 60
- Position: Linebacker

Personal information
- Born: September 20, 1943; San Antonio, Texas, U.S.
- Died: December 13, 2017 (aged 74); Marietta, Georgia, U.S.
- Listed height: 6 ft 2 in (1.88 m)
- Listed weight: 240 lb (109 kg)

Career information
- High school: Thomas Jefferson (San Antonio)
- College: Texas (1963–1965)
- NFL draft: 1966: 1st round, 1st overall pick
- AFL draft: 1966: 1st round, 5th overall pick

Career history
- Atlanta Falcons (1966–1976)

Awards and highlights
- First-team All-Pro (1967); Second-team All-Pro (1968); 5× Pro Bowl (1966–1968, 1970, 1972); NFL Rookie of the Year (1966); NFL 1960s All-Decade Team; Atlanta Falcons Ring of Honor; National champion (1963); Maxwell Award (1965); Outland Trophy (1965); Knute Rockne Memorial Trophy (1965); Consensus All-American (1965); First-team All-American (1964); 3× First-team All-SWC (1963–1965 (Note: Selected only as a linebacker)); Texas Longhorns No. 60 retired

Career NFL statistics
- Tackles: 1,688
- Interceptions: 12
- Interception yards: 182
- Fumble recoveries: 13
- Sacks: 9.5
- Defensive touchdowns: 2
- Stats at Pro Football Reference
- College Football Hall of Fame

Thomas Henry Nobis Jr. (September 20, 1943 – December 13, 2017), nicknamed "Mr. Falcon", was an American professional football linebacker who played for 11 seasons with the Atlanta Falcons of the National Football League (NFL). He played college football for the Texas Longhorns, where he played as a linebacker and guard, and won the Maxwell Award in 1965. He was the first overall selection in the 1966 NFL draft.

== Early life ==
Born and raised in San Antonio, Texas, Nobis played football at Thomas Jefferson High School, where he was an all-state offensive end and middle linebacker for the Mustangs.

== College career ==
Nobis is one of college football's all-time greatest linebackers. In his tenure with the Texas Longhorns (1963–1965) he averaged nearly 20 tackles a game and, as the only sophomore starter, was an important participant on the Longhorns' 1963 national championship team, which defeated #2 Navy led by Heisman Trophy winner Roger Staubach in the Cotton Bowl. Nobis was also a member of Kappa Alpha Order fraternity at the university.

Nobis was a two-time All-American and made the All-Southwest Conference team three times. As a junior in the 1965 Orange Bowl, he made one of the most famous tackles in the game's history. On fourth-and-inches, and clinging to a 21–17 lead, Nobis led his teammates to a game-saving halt of top-ranked Alabama’s QB Joe Namath. Nobis was an iron man, playing (and starting) on both defense and offense for his entire college career. Aside from being an All-American linebacker, he also played guard on the offensive side of the ball and was often the primary blocker on touchdown runs. Famed Texas head coach Darrell Royal called him "the finest two-way player I have ever seen." A knee injury slowed him during the latter part of his senior season, but he still was able to perform at a high level and won a number of major individual awards including the Knute Rockne Award, best lineman, the Outland Trophy, best interior lineman, and the Maxwell Award for college football's best player. Nobis also finished seventh in the Heisman voting to USC's Mike Garrett. He appeared on the covers of LIFE, Sports Illustrated and TIME magazines. In 1999, Sports Illustrated included him on its All-Century Team for college football.

== Professional career ==
In November 1965, Nobis became the first player drafted by the expansion Atlanta Falcons as well as the second linebacker to be chosen first overall when he was taken with the #1 pick in the 1966 NFL draft, held on November 27, 1965. The Houston Oilers also selected him in the AFL draft. This presented a dilemma and also sparked a debate that reached as far as outer space when astronaut Frank Borman (a big Oilers fan), aboard Gemini 7, talked back to earth with the message, "tell Nobis to sign with Houston." (Borman's sons were ball boys for the Oilers.) Nobis instead signed with Atlanta on December 14 and became the first member of the Atlanta Falcons, gaining the nickname "Mr. Falcon".

Nobis joined the Falcons for their inaugural season in 1966. That season, he won the league's NFL Rookie of the Year, was voted to the Pro Bowl and amassed 294 combined tackles which still stands today as the team's all-time single-season record, and is unofficially the most tackles ever credited to one player, in a season, in NFL history. In eleven professional seasons he led the Falcons in tackles nine times, went to five Pro Bowls (one in 1972 after two knee surgeries), was named All-Pro twice and was chosen for the NFL's "All-Decade Team" for the 1960s. Miami Dolphins great, running back Larry Csonka commented, "I'd rather play against Dick Butkus than Nobis," and Falcons coach Norm Van Brocklin once pointed to Nobis' locker and proclaimed, "There's where our football team dresses."

Nobis is a member of the Atlanta Falcons' Ring of Honor. No other Falcons player has ever worn the number. In 2005, he was named to the Professional Football Researchers Association Hall of Very Good in the association's third HOVG class.

== Awards and honors ==
NFL

- First-team All-Pro (1967)
- Second-team All-Pro (1968)
- 5× Pro Bowl (1966–1968, 1970, 1972)
- NFL Rookie of the Year (1966)
- NFL 1960s All-Decade Team
- Atlanta Falcons Ring of Honor

College

- National champion (1963)
- Maxwell Award (1965)
- Outland Trophy (1965)
- Knute Rockne Memorial Trophy (1965)
- Consensus All-American (1965)
- First-team All-American (1964)
- 3× First-team All-SWC (1963–1965 (Note: Selected only as a linebacker))
- Texas Longhorns No. 60 retired

Other

- Atlanta Sports Hall of Fame
- Georgia Sports Hall of Fame
- Texas Sports Hall of Fame

== Hall of Fame credentials ==
Nobis enjoyed a successful NFL career that many believe is worthy of Pro Football Hall of Fame induction. Former NFL player and coach Dan Reeves, while head coach of the Falcons, remarked, "As a running back for eight seasons in the NFL, I certainly took my share of hits. Unfortunately I remember some of them, particularly the ones from Falcons linebacker Tommy Nobis. 'Mr. Falcon,' as he is known in this part of the country, should be considered a worthy candidate for the Hall of Fame.” Reeves based his assertion on the fact that while playing in Atlanta, prior to the days of mass media coverage, Nobis was overlooked because of the “Falcons lack of success during his tenure”. He states, “I played and coached on some great teams while I was with Dallas. Those teams consisted of Hall of Fame members like Bob Lilly, Roger Staubach and Tom Landry. I feel that Nobis' contributions on the field merit those of the Cowboys Hall of Fame players.” Atlanta Journal-Constitution columnist and Hall of Fame voter Furman Bisher wrote, "There isn't much more one can say about Tommy Nobis. In the glow of a winning team, where he would have been a star on the isolated camera, he would already have been residing in Canton. It's not a Falcons thing, it's a Nobis thing, and here is a man who lives up to all the ideals I would establish for admission to the Pro Football Hall of Fame." Nobis has been nominated to the Pro Football Hall of Fame several times, and was a finalist in both 2020 and 2022.

== After the NFL ==
Number 60 is also revered at Texas where it was offered only to the best of linebackers. All American Britt Hager wore #60 during his senior season, as did All American Brian Jones. In 2004, another Longhorn All-American linebacker, Derrick Johnson, decided to wear the jersey in his final collegiate home game to honor Nobis. The number has recently joined Earl Campbell's #20, Bobby Layne's #22, Ricky Williams' #34, Vince Young's #10 and Colt McCoy's #12 as UT's only retired numbers.

Nobis was inducted into the Texas Longhorn Hall of Honor in 1976. He was named to Sports Illustrated ’s All-Century Team (1869–1969) and is a member of the College Football Hall of Fame, the State of Texas Hall of Fame, the Georgia Sports Hall of Fame, the San Antonio Sports Hall of Fame, and the Atlanta Sports Hall of Fame. In May 2007, he was inducted as a charter member into the Thomas Jefferson High School Alumni Hall of Fame.

Nobis retired from the Falcons after 40 years as a member of the organization, in the front office and on the field.

Apart from football, Nobis was a co-founder and a board of directors member of the Tommy Nobis Center that began in 1976. The mission of the organization is to develop and provide job training, employment, and vocational support for youth and adults with disabilities and other barriers to employment. He won the Joseph P. Kennedy Jr. award for his work with the Georgia Special Olympics and has been named the NFL Man of the Year.

Nobis died on December 13, 2017, at home at age 74, with his wife by his side, after an extended illness. On January 28, 2019, researchers from Boston University confirmed that Nobis had the most severe form of chronic traumatic encephalopathy. He is one of at least 345 NFL players to be diagnosed after death with this disease, which is caused by repeated hits to the head.

== See also ==
- List of Texas Longhorns football All-Americans
- List of Atlanta Falcons first-round draft picks
- List of NFL players with chronic traumatic encephalopathy
