= List of Atlanta Falcons first-round draft picks =

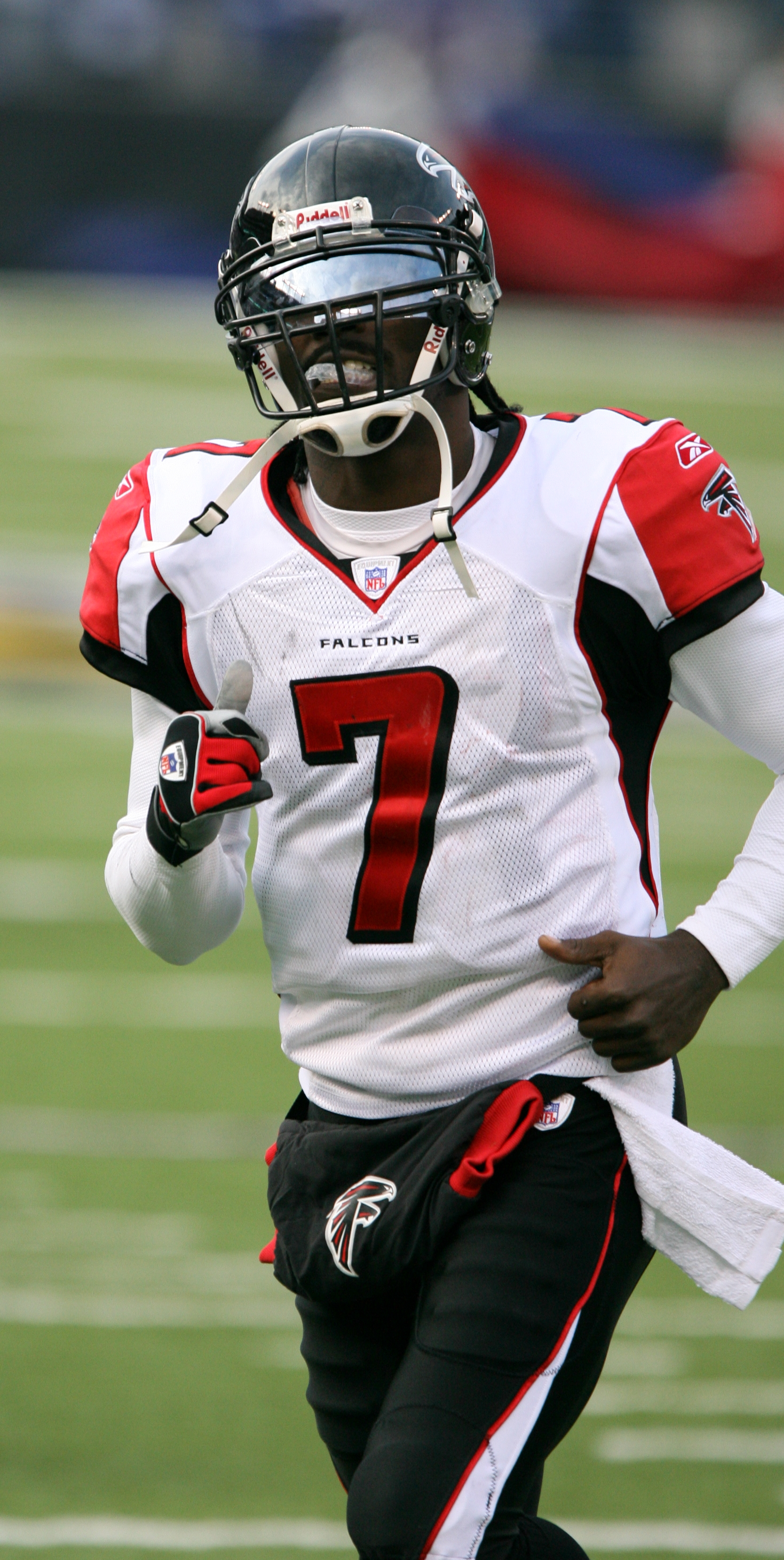
2001 first-overall draft pick Michael Vick during the 2006 season.

The Atlanta Falcons, a professional American football team based in Atlanta, are part of the National Football Conference South Division. They joined the National Football League (NFL) as an expansion team for the 1966 season and became the first NFL franchise in the Southeastern United States. They first participated in the 1966 NFL Annual Player Selection Meeting, more commonly known as the NFL draft. In the NFL Draft, each NFL franchise annually seeks to add new players to its roster. Teams are ranked in reverse order based on the previous season's record, with the worst record picking first, the second-worst picking second and so on. The two exceptions to this order are made for teams that appeared in the previous Super Bowl; the Super Bowl champion always picks 32nd, and the Super Bowl loser always picks 31st. Teams have the option of trading away their picks to other teams for different picks, players, cash, or a combination thereof. Thus, it is not uncommon for a team's actual draft pick to differ from their assigned draft pick, or for a team to have extra or no draft picks in any round due to these trades.

In their first draft, the Falcons had two picks in the first round. These selections were Tommy Nobis, a linebacker from Texas, and Randy Johnson, a quarterback from Texas A&I. The Falcons have selected number one overall four times: Tommy Nobis, Steve Bartkowski, Aundray Bruce, and Michael Vick. The team has also selected number two overall three times and number three overall two times. The Falcons have selected players from Florida State University four times, the most from any university. The team's most recent first-round selections were Jalon Walker, a linebacker from the University of Georgia, and James Pearce Jr., an edge rusher from the University of Tennessee.

== Key ==
Table key
^	Indicates the player was inducted into the Pro Football Hall of Fame.
*	Selected number one overall
—	The Falcons did not draft a player in the first round that year.
Year	Each year links to an article about that particular NFL Draft.
Pick	Indicates the number of the pick within the first round
Position	Indicates the position of the player in the NFL
College	The player's college football team

== Player selections ==
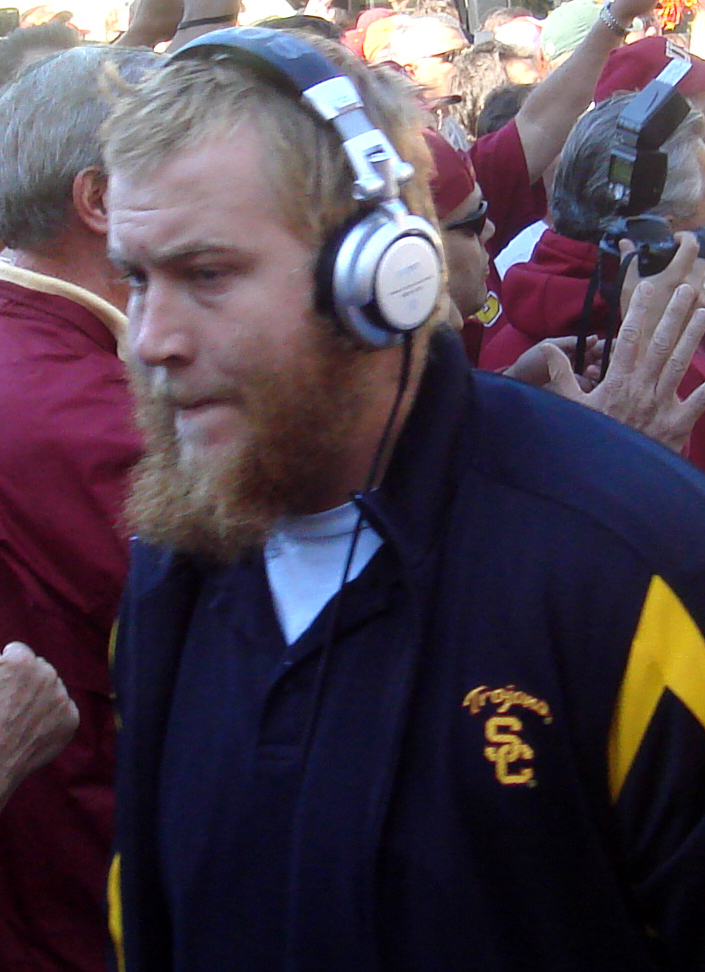
Sam Baker was selected by the Falcons in 2008.

Atlanta Falcons first-round draft picks
Season	Pick	Player name	Position	College	Notes
1966	1	Tommy Nobis *	Linebacker	Texas	
1966	15	Randy Johnson	Quarterback	Texas A&M–Kingsville	
1967	—	No pick	—	—	^{[a]}
1968	3	Claude Humphrey^	Defensive end	Tennessee State	
1969	2	George Kunz	Offensive tackle	Notre Dame	
1970	12	John Small	Linebacker	The Citadel	
1971	7	Joe Profit	Running back	Louisiana–Monroe	
1972	15	Clarence Ellis	Safety	Notre Dame	
1973	—	No pick	—	—	^{[b]}
1974	—	No pick	—	—	^{[c]}
1975	1	Steve Bartkowski *	Quarterback	California	^{[d]}
1976	9	Bubba Bean	Running back	Texas A&M	
1977	6	Warren Bryant	Offensive tackle	Kentucky	
1977	20	Wilson Faumuina	Defensive tackle	San Jose State	^{[e]}
1978	13	Mike Kenn	Offensive tackle	Michigan	
1979	17	Don Smith	Defensive end	Miami (FL)	
1980	7	Junior Miller	Tight end	Nebraska	
1981	25	Bobby Butler	Cornerback	Florida State	
1982	9	Gerald Riggs	Running back	Arizona State	
1983	16	Mike Pitts	Defensive end	Alabama	
1984	9	Rick Bryan	Defensive tackle	Oklahoma	
1985	2	Bill Fralic	Offensive tackle	Pittsburgh	^{[f]}
1986	2	Tony Casillas	Defensive tackle	Oklahoma	
1986	17	Tim Green	Linebacker	Syracuse	^{[g]}
1987	12	Chris Miller	Quarterback	Oregon	
1988	1	Aundray Bruce *	Linebacker	Auburn	
1989	5	Deion Sanders^	CB	Florida State	
1989	27	Shawn Collins	Wide receiver	Northern Arizona	^{[h]}
1990	20	Steve Broussard	Running back	Washington State	^{[i]}^{[j]}
1991	3	Bruce Pickens	Cornerback	Nebraska	
1991	13	Mike Pritchard	Wide receiver	Colorado	^{[i]}
1992	8	Bob Whitfield	Offensive tackle	Stanford	^{[k]}
1992	19	Tony Smith	Running back	Southern Miss	
1993	9	Lincoln Kennedy	Offensive tackle	Washington	
1994	—	No pick	—	—	^{[l]}
1995	26	Devin Bush Sr.	Safety	Florida State	^{[m]}
1996	—	No pick	—	—	^{[l]}
1997	11	Michael Booker	Cornerback	Nebraska	^{[n]}
1998	12	Keith Brooking	Linebacker	Georgia Tech	
1999	30	Patrick Kerney	Defensive end	Virginia	
2000	—	No pick	—	—	^{[o]}
2001	1	Michael Vick *	Quarterback	Virginia Tech	^{[p]}
2002	18	T. J. Duckett	Running back	Michigan State	^{[q]}
2003	—	No pick	—	—	^{[r]}
2004	8	DeAngelo Hall	Cornerback	Virginia Tech	
2004	29	Michael Jenkins	Wide receiver	Ohio State	^{[s]}
2005	27	Roddy White	Wide receiver	UAB	
2006	—	No pick	—	—	^{[t]}
2007	8	Jamaal Anderson	Defensive end	Arkansas	^{[u]}
2008	3	Matt Ryan	Quarterback	Boston College	
2008	21	Sam Baker	Offensive tackle	USC	^{[v]}
2009	24	Peria Jerry	Defensive tackle	Ole Miss	
2010	19	Sean Weatherspoon	Linebacker	Missouri	
2011	6	Julio Jones	Wide receiver	Alabama	^{[w]}
2012	—	No pick	—	—	^{[w]}
2013	22	Desmond Trufant	Cornerback	Washington	^{[x]}
2014	6	Jake Matthews	Offensive tackle	Texas A&M	
2015	8	Vic Beasley	Outside linebacker	Clemson	
2016	17	Keanu Neal	Strong Safety	Florida	
2017	26	Takkarist McKinley	Defensive end	UCLA	^{[y]}
2018	26	Calvin Ridley	Wide receiver	Alabama	
2019	14	Chris Lindstrom	Offensive guard	Boston College	
2019	31	Kaleb McGary	Offensive tackle	Washington	^{[z]}
2020	16	A. J. Terrell	Cornerback	Clemson	
2021	4	Kyle Pitts	Tight end	Florida	
2022	8	Drake London	Wide receiver	USC	
2023	8	Bijan Robinson	Running back	Texas	
2024	8	Michael Penix Jr	Quarterback	Washington	
2025	15	Jalon Walker	Linebacker	Georgia	
2025	26	James Pearce Jr.	Defensive end	Tennessee	
2026	—	No pick	—	—	^{[aa]}

== Footnotes ==
- ^{a} The Falcons traded the #3 overall pick of the 1967 draft to the San Francisco 49ers for wide receiver Bernie Casey, offensive tackle Jim Wilson, and defensive end Jim Norton.
- ^{b} The Falcons traded their #14 overall pick to the Houston Oilers for defensive tackle Mike Tilleman.
- ^{c} The Falcons traded their #17 overall pick to the Minnesota Vikings along with quarterback Bob Berry for quarterback Bob Lee and linebacker Lonnie Warwick.
- ^{d} The Falcons traded their #3 overall pick along with offensive tackle George Kunz to Baltimore Colts for the Colts' first and sixth-round picks.
- ^{e} The Falcons acquired this pick from the St. Louis Cardinals.
- ^{f} The Falcons traded their #4 overall pick along with a third-round pick to the Minnesota Vikings for the #2 overall pick.
- ^{g} The Falcons traded their 1985 second-round pick and 1986 second-round pick to the Washington Redskins for the Redskins' 1985 second-round pick and the #17 overall pick in 1986.
- ^{h} The Falcons acquired this pick from the Cincinnati Bengals for the second, fourth, and tenth-round picks.
- ^{i 1} ^{2} The Falcons traded their #1 overall pick to the Indianapolis Colts for the Colts' fifth-round pick in 1990, #13 overall pick in 1991, wide receiver Andre Rison, and offensive tackle Chris Hinton.
- ^{j} The Falcons acquired this pick from the Washington Redskins.
- ^{k} The Falcons acquired this pick from the New England Patriots.
- ^{l 1} ^{2} The Falcons traded their #7 overall pick along with the third-round pick in 1994 and the #19 overall pick in 1996 to the Indianapolis Colts for quarterback Jeff George.
- ^{m} The Falcons traded their #10 overall pick to the Cleveland Browns for the #26 pick and running back Eric Metcalf.
- ^{n} The Falcons acquired this pick along with the second, third, and fourth-round picks from the Seattle Seahawks for the #11 overall pick along with the third-round pick.
- ^{o} The Falcons traded their #5 overall pick to the Baltimore Ravens for the 1999 second-round pick.
- ^{p} The Falcons traded their #5 overall pick along with wide receiver Tim Dwight, the 2002 second and 2001 third-round picks to the San Diego Chargers for the #1 overall pick.
- ^{q} The Falcons traded their #17 overall pick to the Oakland Raiders for the #18 overall pick and the fifth-round pick.
- ^{r} The Falcons traded their #23 overall pick to the Buffalo Bills for wide receiver Peerless Price.
- ^{s} The Falcons traded their second, third, and fourth-round picks to the Indianapolis Colts for the #29 overall and third-round picks.
- ^{t} The Falcons traded their #15 overall pick to the Denver Broncos for the #29 overall, third-round and a 2007 fourth-round picks. The Falcons then traded the #29 overall pick to the New York Jets for defensive end John Abraham.
- ^{u} The Falcons traded their #10 overall pick and quarterback Matt Schaub to the Houston Texans for the #8 overall, second-round, and 2008 second-round picks.
- ^{v} The Falcons traded two second-round picks and a fourth-round pick to the Washington Redskins for the #21 overall pick along with the third and fifth-round picks.
- ^{w 1} ^{2} The Falcons traded their #27 overall pick along with second-round, fourth-round and a 2012 first-round and fourth-round picks to the Cleveland Browns for the #6 overall pick .
- ^{x} The Falcons traded their #30 overall pick along with third- (92nd), and sixth- (198th) round selections to the St. Louis Rams in exchange for St. Louis 2013 #22nd overall pick along with a 7th-round selection.
- ^{y} The Falcons traded their #31 overall pick along with third- (95th), and seventh- (249th) round selections to the Seattle Seahawks in exchange for Seattle's 2017 #26th overall pick.
- ^{z} The Falcons traded picks #45(second round) and #79 (third round) to the Los Ángeles Rams. In exchange, the Falcons got the Rams' #31 and #203 (sixth round) Picks
- ^{aa} Atlanta traded a first-round selection (13th overall), and 2025 second- and seventh-round selections to the LA Rams in exchange for 2025 first- and third-round selections.
