= 1965 All-America college football team =

Official list of the best college football players of 1965

The 1965 All-America college football team is composed of college football players who were selected as All-Americans by various organizations that chose All-America college football teams in 1965.

The NCAA recognizes six selectors as "official" for the 1965 season. They are (1) the American Football Coaches Association (AFCA), (2) the Associated Press (AP), (3) the Central Press Association (CP), (4) the Football Writers Association of America (FWAA), (5) the Newspaper Enterprise Association (NEA), and (6) the United Press International (UPI). Four of the six teams (AP, UPI, NEA, and FWAA) were selected by polling of sports writers and/or broadcasters. The CP team was selected with input from the captains of the major college teams. The AFCA team was based on a poll of more than 500 coaches. Other notable selectors, though not recognized by the NCAA as official, included The Football News (FN), a weekly national football newspaper, Time magazine, The Sporting News (TSN), and the Walter Camp Football Foundation (WC).

Three players were unanimously selected as first-team players by all six official selectors as well as the four unofficial selectors. They are: (1) USC running back Mike Garrett who led the NCAA with 1,440 rushing yards and won the 1965 Heisman Trophy; (2) Tulsa end Howard Twilley who in 1965 set an NCAA record with 1,779 receiving yards, a single-season record that stood for 30 years; and (3) Illinois fullback Jim Grabowski who was second in the NCAA with 1,258 rushing yards and won the 1965 Chicago Tribune Silver Football trophy after breaking the Big Ten Conference career rushing record. Garrett, Twilley, and Grabowski also finished first, second, and third in the 1965 Heisman Trophy voting with 926, 528, and 481 points, respectively. All three were later inducted into the College Football Hall of Fame.

The 1965 Michigan State Spartans football team were ranked No. 1 in the final UPI Coaches Poll and led the country with eight players receiving at least one first-team All-American designation. The Spartans' first-team honorees were: defensive back George Webster (AFCA, AP, NEA, UPI, FN, WC); defensive end Bubba Smith (AFCA, UPI, WC); end Gene Washington (CP, FN); quarterback Steve Juday (AP); running backs Clinton Jones (FWAA) and Bob Apisa (FN); middle guard Harold Lucas (NEA); and linebacker Ron Goovert (FWAA).

Purdue, ranked No. 13 in the final UPI Coaches' Poll, finished second with four first-team honorees: quarterback Bob Griese (AFCA, CP, NEA, UPI, FN, WC); defensive tackle Jerry Shay (AFCA, FN); offensive tackle Karl Singer (AP); and offensive end Bob Hadrick (FN). Notre Dame, Arkansas, and Nebraska tied for third place, each with three first-team selections.

== Consensus All-Americans ==
The NCAA recognizes 22 players as "consensus" All-Americans for the 1965 season. The following chart identifies the consensus All-Americans and displays which first-team designations they received. The UPI's All-America team vote count (out of a possible 242) and Heisman Trophy point total, where applicable, is also included in the chart for each of the consensus All-Americans.

Name	Position	School	Official selectors	Others	UPI votes	Heisman points
Mike Garrett	Running back	USC	AFCA, AP, CP, FWAA, NEA, UPI (6/6)	FN, Time, TSN, WC	195	926
Howard Twilley	End	Tulsa	AFCA, AP, CP, FWAA, NEA, UPI (6/6)	FN, Time, TSN, WC	194	528
Jim Grabowski	Running back	Illinois	AFCA, AP, CP, FWAA, NEA, UPI (6/6)	FN, Time, TSN, WC	178	481
Dick Arrington	Guard	Notre Dame	AFCA, AP, CP, FWAA, NEA, UPI (6/6)	FN, WC	166	na
Donny Anderson	Running back	Texas Tech	AFCA, AP, FWAA, NEA, UPI (5/6)	FN, Time, TSN, WC	146	408
Carl McAdams	Linebacker	Oklahoma	AFCA, AP, CP, NEA, UPI (5/6)	FN, Time, TSN, WC	144	na
Tommy Nobis	Linebacker	Texas	AFCA, AP, FWAA, NEA, UPI (5/6)	FN, Time, TSN, WC	187	205
Nick Rassas	Defensive back	Notre Dame	AFCA, AP, FWAA, NEA, UPI (5/6)	FN, Time, TSN, WC	160	na
Johnny Roland	Defensive back	Missouri	AFCA, AP, FWAA, NEA, UPI (5/6)	FN, TSN, WC	148	na
Glen Ray Hines	Tackle	Arkansas	AFCA, AP, UPI, FWAA, NEA (5/6)	FN, WC	159	na
Paul Crane	Center	Alabama	AFCA, AP, UPI, FWAA, NEA (5/6)	WC	130	na
Aaron Brown	Defensive end	Minnesota	AP, FWAA, NEA, UPI (4/6)	FN, Time, TSN, WC	128	na
Walt Barnes	Defensive tackle	Nebraska	AFCA, AP, FWAA, NEA (4/6)	FN, Time, TSN, WC	87	na
Sam Ball	Tackle	Kentucky	AFCA, UPI, FWAA, NEA (4/6)	Time, TSN, WC	85	na
Loyd Phillips	Defensive tackle	Arkansas	AFCA, AP, CP, UPI (4/6)	FN, WC	99	na
Bob Griese	Quarterback	Purdue	AFCA, CP, NEA, UPI (4/6)	FN, WC	98	193
George Webster	Defensive back	Michigan State	AFCA, AP, NEA, UPI (4/6)	FN, WC	155	na
Frank Emanuel	Linebacker	Tennessee	AP, FWAA, NEA (3/6)	FN, Time, TSN, WC	32	na
Bill Yearby	Defensive tackle	Michigan	AFCA, NEA, UPI (3/6)	Time, TSN, WC	96	na
Freeman White	End	Nebraska	FWAA, NEA, UPI (3/6)	FN, WC	54	na
Stas Maliszewski	Guard	Princeton	CP, NEA (2/6)	FN, WC	56	na
Bubba Smith	Defensive end	Michigan State	AFCA, UPI (2/6)	WC	100	na

== Offensive selections ==
=== Ends ===
- Howard Twilley, Tulsa (College Football Hall of Fame) (AFCA, AP-1, CP-1, FWAA-1, UPI-1, NEA-1, FN, Time, TSN, WC)
- Freeman White, Nebraska (AP-2, CP-3, FWAA-1, UPI-1, NEA-1, FN, WC)
- Charles Casey, Florida (AFCA, AP-1, NEA-2, CP-3)
- Milt Morin, Massachusetts (Time, TSN)
- Gene Washington, Michigan State (CP-1, UPI-2, FN [end])
- Bobby Crockett, Arkansas (UPI-2, FWAA-1)
- Dave Williams, Washington (AP-2)
- Bob Hadrick, Purdue (CP-2, FN)
- Doug Moreau, LSU (FN)

=== Tackles ===
- Sam Ball, Kentucky (AFCA, AP-2, UPI-1, NEA-1, FWAA-1, Time, TSN, WC)
- Glen Ray Hines, Arkansas (AFCA, AP-1, UPI-1, NEA-1, FWAA-1, FN, WC)
- Francis Peay, Missouri (AP-2, CP-3, UPI-2, NEA-2, Time, TSN)
- Karl Singer, Purdue (AP-1)
- Tom Mack, Michigan (UPI-2, NEA-2)

=== Guards ===
- Dick Arrington, Notre Dame (AFCA, AP-1, CP-1, FWAA-1, UPI-1, NEA-1, FN, WC)
- Stas Maliszewski, Princeton (AP-2 [linebacker], CP-1, UPI-2, NEA-1, FN, WC)
- Doug Van Horn, Ohio State (AFCA, CP-2 [tackle], UPI-1)
- John Niland, Iowa (AP-2, Time, TSN)
- Stan Hindman, Mississippi (AP-2, CP-2, UPI-2, NEA-2, FN, Time, TSN)
- Wayne Foster, Washington State (FWAA-1, FN [tackle])
- Larry Gagner, Florida (FN, NBC)
- Tom Regner, Notre Dame (NEA-2)
- Paul Savidge, Princeton (CP-2)
- Joe Fratangelo, North Carolina (CP-3)

=== Centers ===
- Paul Crane, Alabama (AFCA, AP-1, UPI-1, NEA-1, FWAA-1, WC)
- Pat Killorin, Syracuse (UPI-2, NEA-2 [guard], Time, TSN)

=== Quarterbacks ===
- Bob Griese, Purdue (College and Pro Football Halls of Fame) (AFCA, CP-1, UPI-1, NEA-1, FN, WC)
- Steve Spurrier, Florida (AP-2, FWAA-1)
- Rick Norton, Kentucky (CP-2, Time, TSN)
- Steve Juday, Michigan State (AP-1, UPI-2)
- Gary Beban, UCLA (CP-3, NEA-2, FN)
- Steve Sloan, Alabama (FN)
- Billy Anderson, Tulsa (UPI-2)

=== Running backs ===
- Mike Garrett, USC (College Football Hall of Fame) (AFCA, AP-1, CP-1, FWAA-1, UPI-1 [halfback], NEA-1 [halfback], FN [halfback], Time, TSN, WC)
- Jim Grabowski, Illinois (College Football Hall of Fame) (AFCA, AP-1, CP-1, FWAA-1, UPI-1 [fullback], NEA-1 [fullback], FN [fullback], Time, TSN, WC)
- Donny Anderson, Texas Tech (College Football Hall of Fame) (AFCA, AP-1, CP-2, FWAA-1, UPI-1 [halfback], NEA-1 [FL], FN [halfback], Time, TSN, WC)
- Floyd Little, Syracuse (AP-2, UPI-2, NEA-2, CP-1, FWAA-1, FN [halfback])
- Clinton Jones, Michigan State (AP-2, CP-2, UPI-2, FWAA-1)
- Ray McDonald, Idaho (AP-2, NEA-2 [fullback])
- Harry Jones, Arkansas (NEA-2 [FL])
- Steve Bowman, Alabama (CP-2)
- Bill Wolski, Notre Dame (CP-3, FN [halfback])
- Ron Landeck, Princeton (CP-3)
- Tom Barrington, Ohio State (CP-3)
- Bob Apisa, Michigan State (FN [fullback])

== Defensive selections ==
=== Defensive ends ===
- Aaron Brown, Minnesota (AP-1, CP-2, FWAA-1, UPI-1, NEA-1, FN [end], Time, TSN, WC)
- Bubba Smith, Michigan State (College Football Hall of Fame) (AFCA, UPI-1, WC)
- Lynn Matthews, Florida (NEA-1)
- Ed Weisacosky, Miami (Fla.) (AP-1, NEA-2 [linebacker])
- Tony Jeter, Nebraska (AFCA, UPI-2, NEA-2 [offensive end])
- Ed Long, Dartmouth (AP-2)
- George Pearce, William and Mary (AP-2)
- Cas Banaszek, Northwestern (NEA-2)

=== Defensive tackles ===
- Walt Barnes, Nebraska (AFCA, AP-1, UPI-2, NEA-1, FWAA-1, FN [tackle], Time, TSN, WC)
- Loyd Phillips, Arkansas (College Football Hall of Fame) (AFCA, AP-1, CP-1, UPI-1, NEA-2, FN [tackle]ɫ̩, WC)
- Bill Yearby, Michigan (AFCA, AP-2, CP-1, UPI-1, Time, TSN, WC)
- George Patton, Georgia (AP-1 [middle guard], UPI-2 [defensive end], NEA-2 [defensive end], FWAA-1, FN [tackle])
- George Rice, LSU (CP-2, Time, TSN)
- Jack Thornton, Auburn (NEA-1)
- Jerry Shay, Purdue (AFCA, CP-3, UPI-2, FN [tackle])
- John Richardson, UCLA (AP-2)
- Dick Van Horn, Ohio State (NEA-2)

=== Middle guards ===
- Harold Lucas, Michigan State (CP-3 [guard], NEA-1 [middle guard])
- John Battle, Georgia Tech (AP-2 [middle guard])
- Jack Shinholser, Florida State (NEA-2 [middle guard])

=== Linebackers ===
- Carl McAdams, Oklahoma (AFCA [linebacker], AP-1 [linebacker], CP-1 [center], UPI-1 [linebacker], NEA-1 [linebacker], FN [center], Time, TSN, WC)
- Tommy Nobis, Texas (College Football Hall of Fame) (AFCA, AP-1 [offensive end], CP-2 [center], FWAA-1, UPI-1, NEA-1, FN [guard], Time, TSN, WC)
- Frank Emanuel, Tennessee (College Football Hall of Fame) (AP-1, CP-3 [center], FWAA-1 [center], UPI-2, NEA-1, FN [guard], Time, TSN, WC)
- Ike Kelley, Ohio State (AP-1, UPI-1, FN [center])
- Ron Goovert, Michigan State (UPI-2, NEA-2, FWAA-1)
- Doug Buffone, Louisville (AP-2)
- Bill Cody, Auburn (AP-2, UPI-2, FN [center])
- Jim Lynch, Notre Dame (NEA-2)

=== Defensive backs ===
- Nick Rassas, Notre Dame (AFCA, AP-1, UPI-1, NEA-1 [safety], FWAA-1, FN [halfback], Time, TSN, WC)
- Johnny Roland, Missouri (College Football Hall of Fame) (AFCA, AP-1, UPI-1, NEA-1, FWAA-1, FN [halfback], TSN, WC)
- George Webster, Michigan State (College Football Hall of Fame) (AFCA, AP-1, UPI-1, NEA-1, FN [roving back], WC)
- Bruce Bennett, Florida (UPI-1, NEA-2 [safety])
- Billy Clay, Mississippi (TSN)
- Charlie Brown, Syracuse (TSN)
- Ben Hawkins, Arizona State (AP-2, NEA-2, Time)
- Eric Crabtree, Pittsburgh (Time)
- Rodger Bird, Kentucky (Time)
- Frank Horak, Texas Christian (AP-2, UPI-2)
- Mike Weger, Bowling Green (AP-2)
- Willie Gaskins, Washington State (UPI-2, NEA-2)
- Larry Wachholtz, Nebraska (UPI-2)
- Jerry Mosher, California (UPI-2)

== Special teams ==
=== Kicking specialist ===
- Charlie Gogolak, Princeton (AP-1, FN)

== Key ==
- **Bold** – Consensus All-American
- -1 – First-team selection
- -2 – Second-team selection
- -3 – Third-team selection

=== Official selectors ===
- AFCA = American Football Coaches Association, based on votes cast by over 500 members based on personal observations and "game films provided by the Eastman Kodak Company", with 1965 being the first year the AFCA voted on separate offensive and defensive units
- AP = Associated Press, based on recommendations from sports writers and broadcasters on eight regional boards appointed by the AP separate offensive and defensive units
- CP = Central Press Association, selected for the 35th year "with the aid of the captains of the major schools themselves", selections made without designation of separate offensive and defensive units
- FWAA = Football Writers Association of America, announced in Look magazine; selected without reference to offensive and defensive units
- NEA = Newspaper Enterprise Association, selections of separate offensive and defensive units
- UPI = United Press International, selected "by 242 sports writers and broadcasters in a nation-wide ballot"; separate offensive and defensive units

=== Other selectors ===
- FN = The Football News, consisting of 34 players selected by the paper's correspondents and staff members based upon personal observations and consultation with pro and college scouts, sportswriters and broadcasters
- Time = Time magazine
- TSN = The Sporting News
- WC = Walter Camp Football Foundation

== See also ==
- 1965 All-Atlantic Coast Conference football team
- 1965 All-Big Ten Conference football team
- 1965 All-Pacific Athletic Conference football team
- 1965 All-SEC football team
- 1965 All-Southwest Conference football team
