= Steve Juday =

American football quarterback (born 1945)

Profile
- Position: Quarterback

Personal information
- Listed height: 6 ft 0 in (1.83 m)
- Listed weight: 180 lb (82 kg)

Career information
- College: Michigan State (1963–1965)

Awards and highlights
- First-team All-American (1965)

Steve Juday (born c. 1945) is an American former college football player who was a quarterback for the Michigan State Spartans from 1963 to 1965.

== Early life ==
A native of Northville, Michigan, he attended Northville High School where he was rated as the best quarterback in the state.

== Michigan State ==
Juday enrolled at Michigan State University in 1962. He played quarterback for the Spartans from 1963 to 1965. He led the 1965 Michigan State Spartans football team to a national championship. During the 1965 season, he completed 89 of 168 passes for 1,173 passing yards, seven touchdowns, seven interceptions, and a 117.0 quarterback rating. He also rushed for 170 yards for a team-high 1,343 yards of total offense. He was the first Michigan State quarterback to pass for 1,000 yards in a season.

Juday was a team co-captain in 1965 (sharing the honor with Don Japinga) and received the Governor of Michigan Award as the most valuable player on the 1965 team. He also finished sixth in the 1965 voting for the Heisman Trophy. He was also selected by the Associated Press as the first-team quarterback on its 1965 All-America football team, though he lost the equivalent United Press International selection to Purdue's Bob Griese. Juday was also named as a winner of the 1965 Scholar-Athlete Award by the National Football Foundation, and won the Big Ten Medal of Honor as the Michigan State male athlete with the most outstanding athletic and academic achievement. He closed his collegiate career as Michigan State's all-time leader in passing yardage and touchdown passes, and was inducted into the Michigan State Athletic Hall of Fame in 2016.

Juday played for the Ypsilanti Vikings of the Midwest Football League (MFL) in 1967 and led the league in passing. On May 29, 1968, the Hamtramck Chargers purchased Juday from the Vikings. By September 1968, he had begun playing for the MFL's Pontiac Firebirds.

== Later life ==
In later years, Juday lived in Midland, Michigan, joining Dow Chemical Co. in 1967 and serving as the company's director of human resources starting in 1987. In 1990, he received the NCAA 1990 Silver Anniversary Award presented to former student athletes who went on to distinguished careers.

His sons Rich and Bob Juday played baseball for Michigan State.
