= Jim Ward (quarterback) =

American football player (born 1944)

No. 16, 7
- Position: Quarterback

Personal information
- Born: July 16, 1944 (age 82); Frederick, Maryland, U.S.
- Listed height: 6 ft 2 in (1.88 m)
- Listed weight: 196 lb (89 kg)

Career information
- High school: Gaithersburg (Gaithersburg, Maryland)
- College: Gettysburg
- NFL draft: 1966: 14th round, 215th overall pick

Career history
- Baltimore Colts (1967–1969); Buffalo Bills (1970)*; Washington Redskins (1970); New Orleans Saints (1971)*; Philadelphia Eagles (1971)
- * Offseason or practice squad member only

Awards and highlights
- NFL champion (1968); Second-team All-East (1965)

Career NFL statistics
- TD–INT: 2–2
- Passing yards: 165
- Passer rating: 63.8
- Stats at Pro Football Reference

James Edgar Harold Ward (born July 16, 1944) is an American former professional football player who was a quarterback in the National Football League (NFL). He played college football for the Gettysburg Bullets. He played in the NFL for the Baltimore Colts from 1967 to 1968 and for the Philadelphia Eagles in 1971. With the Colts up 34–0, Ward briefly saw action in relief of starting quarterback Earl Morrall in the final minutes of the 1968 NFL Championship Game.

He attended Gettysburg College and was the only player in school history to be drafted.
