= E. Greenard Poles =

American gridiron football player (born 1943)

Profile
- Position: Linebacker

Personal information
- Born: August 16, 1943 (age 83); Rochester, New York, U.S.
- Listed height: 5 ft 11 in (1.80 m)
- Listed weight: 225 lb (102 kg)

Career information
- College: Buffalo

Career history
- 1966–1968: Edmonton Eskimos
- 1969–1970: BC Lions

Awards and highlights
- Joe Clark Memorial Trophy (1966); Second-team All-East (1965); UB Athletic Hall of Fame inductee (1996)

Edgar Greenard Poles (born August 16, 1943) is a retired Canadian football player. A linebacker, Poles attended the University at Buffalo where he played college football for the Buffalo Bulls football team. Poles later played professional football in the Canadian Football League (CFL), playing for the Edmonton Eskimos from 1966 to 1968, and for the BC Lions from 1969 to 1970.
