= Bill Stetz =

American football player (born 1945)

No. 65, 73, 70
- Position: Guard

Personal information
- Born: September 28, 1945 (age 81); Milwaukee, Wisconsin, U.S.
- Listed height: 6 ft 3 in (1.91 m)
- Listed weight: 250 lb (113 kg)

Career information
- High school: Waukesha (WI) Catholic Memorial
- College: Boston College (1963-1966)
- NFL draft: 1967: 13th round, 316th overall pick

Career history
- Philadelphia Eagles (1967); Pottstown / Philadelphia Firebirds (1968-1970); Norfolk Neptunes (1971)

Awards and highlights
- Second-team All-East (1965)

Career NFL statistics
- Games played: 2
- Stats at Pro Football Reference

William Alan Stetz (born September 28, 1945) is an American former professional football player who was a guard for the Philadelphia Eagles of the National Football League (NFL) in 1967. He played college football for the Boston College Eagles and was selected by the New Orleans Saints in the 13th round of the 1967 NFL/AFL draft.

== See also ==
- List of Philadelphia Eagles players
