= Bob Apisa =

American football player (born 1945)

No. 45
- Position: Fullback

Personal information
- Born: June 4, 1945 (age 81); Fagatogo, American Samoa

Career information
- High school: Farrington (Honolulu, Hawaii, U.S.)
- College: Michigan State
- NFL draft: 1968: 9th round, 245th overall pick

Career history
- Green Bay Packers (1968)*
- * Offseason or practice squad member only

Awards and highlights
- 2× All-American (1965, 1966); First-team All-Big Ten (1966); Second-team All-Big Ten (1965)

Robert Apisa (born June 4, 1945) is an American actor and former football fullback. He played college football at Michigan State University.

== Early life ==
Apisa, one of eleven children, was born in American Samoa. His parents moved the family to Oahu, Hawaii when he was seven. Apisa began playing football while in ninth grade at Farrington High School, where he also practiced baseball and track.

== Career ==
=== College career ===
Apisa accepted a football scholarship from Michigan State University. He was named a starter at fullback as a sophomore, registering 126 carries for 715 yards (second on the team and third in the conference), a 5.7-yard average and 10 touchdowns. At the end of the season, he was limited with injuries, but still was able to become the first player of Samoan ancestry to be named All-American. He required off-season knee surgery.

On November 19, 1966, he was a part of the contest played against the University of Notre Dame called "The Game of the Century", which ended in a 10–10 tie. It was also the first ever live television sports broadcast in Hawaii. He had 140 rushing yards and one touchdown against the University of Michigan. He suffered a knee injury in the seventh game against Northwestern University and missed most of the remaining contests. He posted 86 carries for 445 yards (5.2-yard avg.) and 9 touchdowns.

As a senior, he struggled to recover from off-season knee surgery. He tallied only 50 carries for 183 yards during the season. Besides being a notable blocker, he finished his college career as the school's all-time leading rushing fullback with 1,343 yards. He was a part of two national championship teams (1965 and 1966).

In 2017, he was inducted into the Michigan State Athletics Hall of Fame. In 2018, he was inducted into the Polynesian Football Hall of Fame.

=== Professional career ===
Apisa was selected by the Green Bay Packers in the ninth round (245th overall) of the 1968 NFL/AFL draft. He was waived on July 30.

=== Acting ===
After retiring from professional football, Apisa spent more than 33 years working as a character actor and stunt coordinator in television series and films.

== Personal life ==
Apisa's grandson, Jacob Isaia, is an offensive lineman for Michigan State University and California State University, Fresno.

== Filmography ==
=== Film ===
Year	Title	Role	Notes
1986	Free Ride	Thug #1	
1987	Three O'Clock High	Cop #1	
1987	Code Name Zebra	Alonso	
1987	Grotesque	Patrick	
1990	Heart Condition	Teller	
1990	The Forbidden Dance	Security Guard #2	
1991	The Perfect Weapon	Man with Red Bandana	Uncredited
1991	The Last Boy Scout	Baynard's Bodyguard	
1992	Kill Fee	Bodyguard #1	
1993	Nowhere to Run	Prisoner	
1993	Point of No Return	The V.I.P.	
1993	The Sandlot	Home Plate Umpire	
1993	Hard Target	Mr. Lopacki	
1993	The Painted Desert	Bones	
1994	The Specialist	Ned's Thug in Hotel Room	Uncredited
1994	A Low Down Dirty Shame	Bouncer at Bar	Uncredited
1995	Under Siege 2: Dark Territory	Dane's Tech	
1996	Executive Decision	Jean-Paul Demou	
1996	Courage Under Fire	Iraqi Tank Commander	
1996	Fled	Jose Marti	
1996	The Glimmer Man	Smith's Bodyguard	Uncredited
1996	Santa with Muscles	Franco	
1997	Gang Related	Bailiff	
1998	The Replacement Killers	Thug	
1998	Savior	Colonel	Uncredited

=== Television ===
Year	Title	Role	Notes
1973–1977	Hawaii Five-O	Portuguese, Regan, George	3 episodes
1980	Waikiki	Kahea	Television film
1981–1987	Magnum, P.I.	Various roles	6 episodes
1985	J.O.E. and the Colonel	Schaefer's Henchman	Television film
1985	Riptide	Reed	Episode: "Robin and Marian"
1985–1986	Airwolf	Various roles	5 episodes
1986	The Fall Guy	Cop	Episode: "Tag Team"
1986–1988	Hunter	Various roles	3 episodes
1988	Simon & Simon	Garcia	Episode: "Forever Hold Your Piece"
1988	L.A. Law	Cop #2	Episode: "Hand Roll Express"
1988	Quiet Victory: The Charlie Wedemeyer Story	Kahuna	Television film
1989	Snoops	Santos	Episode: "Photo Opportunity"
1989, 1990	Jake and the Fatman	Konahe, Raymond Say	2 episodes
1990	Twin Peaks	Bodyguard on Stairs	Episode: "The Orchid's Curse"
1991	The Flash	Joey C.'s Bodyguard	Episode: "Alpha"
1992, 1993	Renegade	Bouncer, Corelli	2 episodes
1993	Marked for Murder	Girado	Television film
1993	Raven	Samoan Sam	Episode: "Heat"
1993	Diagnosis: Murder	Foreman	Episode: "Inheritance of Death"
1994	Dead at 21	Secret Service #2	Episode: "Use Your Illusion"
1999	Baywatch	Erik	Episode: "Water Dance"
