= Stas Maliszewski =

Polish American football player (born 1944)

Profile
- Positions: Guard, linebacker

Personal information
- Born: 1944 (age 81–82)

Career information
- College: Princeton (1964–1965)

Awards and highlights
- Consensus All-American (1965); First-team All-American (1964); 2× First-team All-East (1964, 1965)

Staś Maliszewski (born Stanislaw Maliszewski pol. Stanisław Maliszewski; August 1944 in Poland) is a Polish American former football linebacker. He played college football for Princeton from 1963 through 1965, and was an All-American in 1964 and 1965. He was a Consensus All-American (1965). He was drafted in the sixth round of the 1966 NFL draft by the Baltimore Colts.

Born in August 1944 in German-occupied Poland, Maliszewski and his family (his parents, grandparents, and two brothers) soon became refugees, fleeing ahead of the advancing Soviet army. They wound up in a displaced persons camp in West Germany and in 1951 came to the United States. After processing through Ellis Island, they settled in Davenport, Iowa, where they were sponsored by the First Presbyterian Church. As a high school football player at Assumption High School in Davenport (where one of his classmates was future Miami Dolphins receiver Karl Noonan) Maliszewski was heavily recruited by Notre Dame, but in his senior year, Jim Leach, a Davenport resident and Princeton sophomore home on Christmas break, recruited him for Princeton.

A 1965 Sports Illustrated story described Maliszewski as "a sensitive, deeply religious young man who, Princeton coaches say, gets nasty only when he removes his two front teeth before a game, and then he is about the nastiest thing ever to draw a pro scout to a Princeton football game". At Princeton he majored in philosophy, and his senior thesis was called "The Existence of God in Hume and Kant".

He attended Harvard Business School. He founded Gateway Asset Management, a pension marketing firm based in Chicago. In 1998, as an independent director of the Yacktman Fund, a mutual fund, he was a leader of a widely reported challenge to the fund's management. The fund's shareholders ultimately voted to support the fund's manager and the dissident directors were removed, but the controversy influenced the Securities and Exchange Commission in its development of new rules adopted in 2001 to protect independent fund directors. In 2012, he received a lifetime achievement award from Fund Director Intelligence for his contribution to mutual fund governance.

Maliszewski was the president (and later chairman) of the Princeton Football Association. He is married to Julia Armstrong Jitkoff and has four children by a previous marriage and two step-children.
