= Anthony Yezer =

American economist

Academic background
- Education: Massachusetts Institute of Technology, London School of Economics and Political Science, Dartmouth College

Academic work
- Discipline: Real estate economics, Urban Economics, Labour economics
- Institutions: George Washington University
- Website: Information at IDEAS / RePEc

Anthony Marvin Yezer is a professor of economics at George Washington University in the Columbian College of Arts and Sciences. He has provided expert testimony for the United States Congress and Federal Trade Commission on sub-prime mortgage lending and trade regulation issues. He is Director of the Center for Economic Research and a Fellow of the Homer Hoyt School of Advanced Studies in Real Estate and Urban Economics. He is also an affiliate of the Institute for International Economic Policy.

== Education ==
Yezer received a B.S. from Dartmouth College, M.S. from London School of Economics and Political Science, and his PhD in Economics & Urban Studies from Massachusetts Institute of Technology. He was Rhodes Scholarship finalist and received a National Collegiate Athletic Association Scholar-Athlete Fellowship.

== Work ==
Yezer's research has merited inclusion in more than a dozen journals, and he serves as principal editor for the American Real Estate and Urban Economics Association monograph series. He served on the National Research Council's Panel on Disaster Needs in the Social Sciences which led to the publication of The Economic Consequences of a Catastrophic Earthquake.

In 2013, Yezer published the textbook, "Economics of Crime and Enforcement". "This text is designed for use in a course on the economics of crime in a variety of settings. Assuming only a previous course in basic microeconomics, this innovative book is strongly linked to the new theoretical and empirical journal literature. Showing the power of microeconomics in action, Yezer covers a wide array of topics. There are chapters on the following topics: benefit-cost and the imprisonment decision, enforcement games, juvenile crime, private enforcement, economics of 3 strikes law, broken windows strategies, police profiling, and crime in developing countries. There are also separate chapters on guns, drugs, and capital punishment."
