= Ron Goovert =

American football player and coach (born 1944)

No. 57
- Position: Linebacker

Personal information
- Born: February 15, 1944 (age 82); Detroit, Michigan, U.S.
- Listed height: 5 ft 11 in (1.80 m)
- Listed weight: 225 lb (102 kg)

Career information
- College: Michigan State
- NFL draft: 1966: undrafted

Career history

Playing
- Houston Oilers (1966)*; Charleston Rockets (1966); Detroit Lions (1967); Lansing All Stars (1969–1970); Hamilton Tiger-Cats (1971)*; Lansing All Stars (1971–1972); Flint Sabres (1974)
- * Offseason or practice squad member only

Coaching
- Flint Sabres (1973, 1975) Head coach

Awards and highlights
- First-team All-American (1965); First-team All-Big Ten Conference (1965)

Career NFL statistics
- Games played: 14
- Stats at Pro Football Reference

Ronald Edward Goovert (born February 15, 1944) is an American former professional football player who was a linebacker for the Detroit Lions of the National Football League (NFL) in 1967. He played college football for the Michigan State Spartans. He also played in the Continental Football League for the Charleston Rockets in 1966, and in the Midwest Football League for the Lansing All Stars and Flint Sabres from 1969 to 1972 and 1974. He was the head coach of the Sabres for two seasons.

== Professional career ==
Goovert first signed with the Houston Oilers of the American Football League in July 1966 after going undrafted in both the 1966 NFL draft and 1966 AFL draft. He was then released before the start of the regular season on August 25. He joined the Charleston Rockets of the Continental Football League for the 1966 season.

Goovert next signed with the Detroit Lions of the National Football League on April 4, 1967. He played in 14 games for the Lions in 1967, including three starts. He was released before the start of the 1968 season on September 4, 1968.

Goovert later signed with the Lansing All Stars of the Midwest Football League (MFL) in September 1969. He stayed on with the team through the 1970 season. He spent training camp in 1971 with the Hamilton Tiger-Cats of the Canadian Football League, but returned to the All Stars for the 1971 season. He ultimately retired from his playing career during the 1972 season while with Lansing.

Goovert became the head coach for the Flint Sabres of the MFL for the 1973 season. The Sabres went 7–2–1 under Goovert and finished third in the league. He stepped down as head coach in 1974 and joined the Sabres as a player for the season. He became the head coach again for the 1975 season. The Sabres went 9–1 in 1975, and won the MFL championship game.
