= Charlie Brown (defensive back) =

American gridiron football player (born 1942)

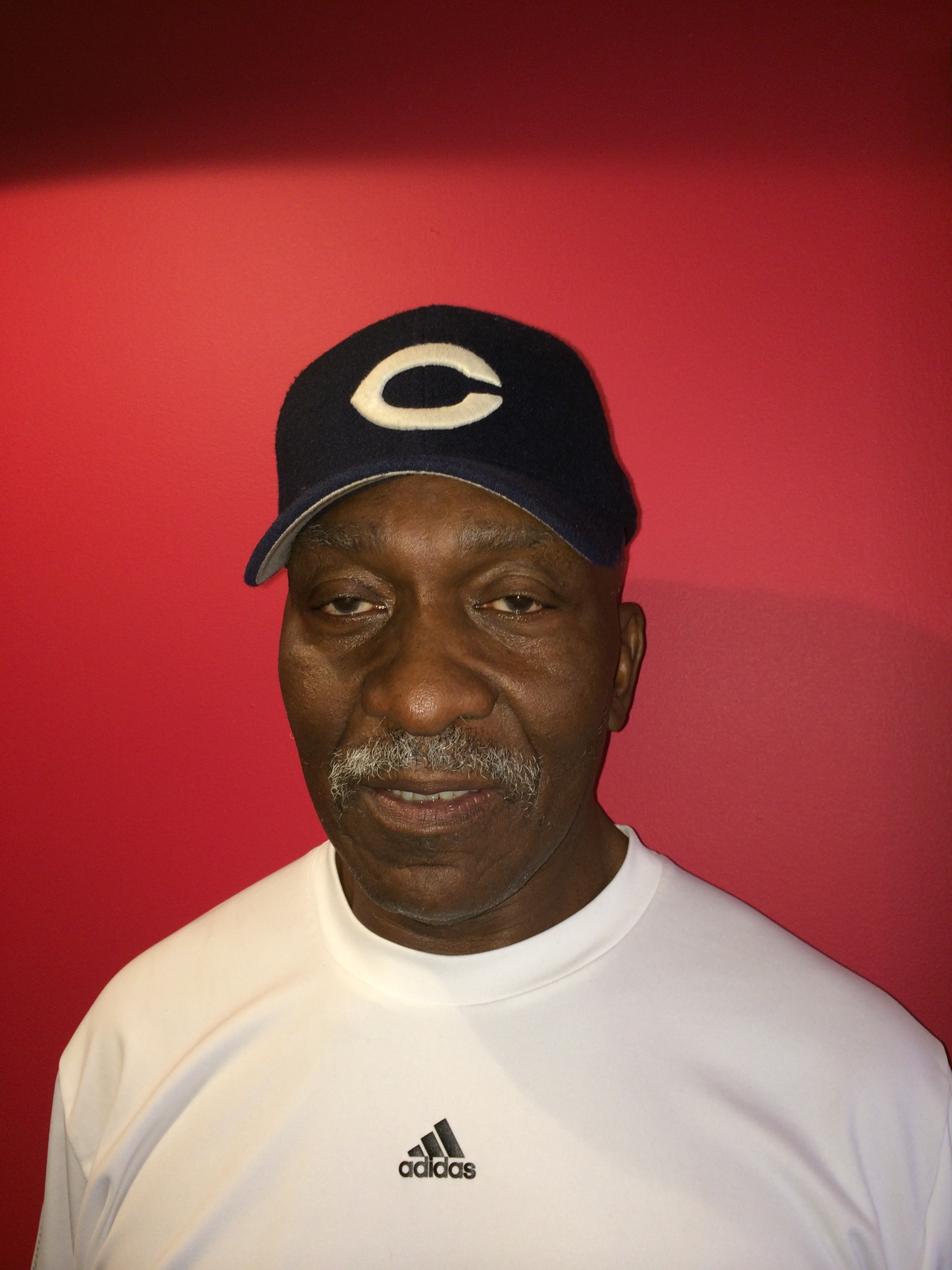
- Brown in 2014

No. 22, 23
- Positions: Defensive back, halfback

Personal information
- Born: September 13, 1942 (age 84); Heflin, Alabama, U.S.
- Listed height: 6 ft 2 in (1.88 m)
- Listed weight: 220 lb (100 kg)

Career information
- High school: Massillon Washington (Massillon, Ohio)
- College: Syracuse (1962-1965)
- NFL draft: 1966: 2nd round, 28th overall pick
- AFL draft: 1966: 4th round, 32nd overall pick

Career history
- Chicago Bears (1966–1967); Buffalo Bills (1968); Hamilton Tiger-Cats (1969)

Awards and highlights
- First-team All-East (1965)

Career NFL/AFL statistics
- Interceptions: 1
- Fumble recoveries: 2
- Rushing yards: 39
- Rushing average: 13
- Stats at Pro Football Reference

Charles Edward Brown (born September 13, 1942) is an American former professional football player who was a defensive back for the Chicago Bears of the National Football League (NFL). He played college football for the Syracuse Orange, and in 1968, he played in the American Football League (AFL) for the Buffalo Bills. He finished his career in the Canadian Football League (CFL) in 1969 with the Hamilton Tiger-Cats, where he returned an interception for 115 yards and a touchdown, at the time the second longest, and now the fifth longest return in league history.

== See also ==
- List of American Football League players
