= Maya Washington =

American poet

Maya Washington is an American filmmaker, actress, playwright, poet, writer, visualist, and arts educator. With a bachelor of arts in theatre from the University of Southern California and a master of fine arts in creative writing from Hamline University, Washington has garnered awards fromJerome Foundation, Minnesota State Arts Board, Minnesota Film and Television, and many more. Her scholarship and creative projects approach issues of diversity and inclusion. Her film work has had a global reach, in Toronto, Budapest, Hong Kong, Berlin, and Rome.

She wrote and directed the 2011 short film White Space starring Ryan Lane, a selection of African American Short Films syndicated series, which follows the life of a deaf performance poet, and was featured as an official selection in over two dozen film festivals, winning many awards. She produced and starred in Life Coach Chronicles (2013), an award-winning web series about friends and families, their circumstances, and their situations from writer and director Freda C. Hobbs. She wrote, directed, and starred in the award-winning short film Clear (2018) about an exoneree reconnecting with her daughter after serving 16 years for a crime she did not commit.

In 2018, Washington released her first feature-length documentary, Through the Banks of the Red Cedar, premiering at the Detroit Free Press Freep Film Festival. The film follows the 50-year legacy of Washington's father, Minnesota Vikings wide-receiver Gene Washington, on his journey from the segregated south to Michigan State University, where he and his teammates led by head coach Duffy Daugherty , played on the first fully racially integrated college football teams, the 1965 and 1966 Spartans football teams.

== Literature ==
- Bodies Built for the Game edited by Natalie Diaz (University of Nebraska, 2019)
- The BreakBeat Poets Vol. 2 : Black Girl Magic edited by Mahogany L. Browne, Idrissa Simmonds, and Jamila Woods (Haymarket Books, 2018)
- Nothing To Lose But Our Chains: Black Voices on Activism, Resistance and Love edited by Marvin K. White (Justice Matters Press, 2018)
- The Beiging of America: Personal Narratives About Being Mixed Race in the Twenty-First Century edited by Cathy J. Scholund-Vials and Tara Betts (2Leaf Press, 2017)
- Prairie Schooner Special Issue: Sports, Winter 2015 edited by Natalie Diaz (University of Nebraska, 2019).
- White Space Poetry Anthology edited by Maya Washington (White Space Poetry Project, 2014)
- The Playwrights’ Center Monologues for Women edited by Kristen Gandrow (Heinemann Drama, 2005)

== Performance background ==
As an actor, Washington has performed at a number of regional and national venues in the United States:Trinity Repertory Company andPenumbra Theatre where she originated the role of August Jackson in William S. Yellow Robe Jr's national tour of Grandchildren of the Buffalo Soldiers which included appearances at The Smithsonian National Museum of the American Indian, Dartmouth, Roundhouse Theater, and other venues nationwide; The Guthrie Theater as a Christmas Carol Company Member for two seasons; History Theatre originating the role of Neecy in Snapshots Life in the city a collaboration between Sounds of Blackness recording artist J.D. Steele and writer David Lawrence Grant, Children's Theatre Company, The Playwrights’ Center, Pillsbury House Theatre, The Powerhouse Theatre, The California Science Center, The House of Blues, and others.

Her play Colorful Women of Invention was commissioned by Youth Performance Company as a touring production in 2003. Her full-length play, South of Adams, received a staged reading at Congo Square Theatre in Chicago as part of the August Wilson Playwriting Initiative in 2005.
