= Gene Washington (American football, born 1944) =

American football player (born 1944)

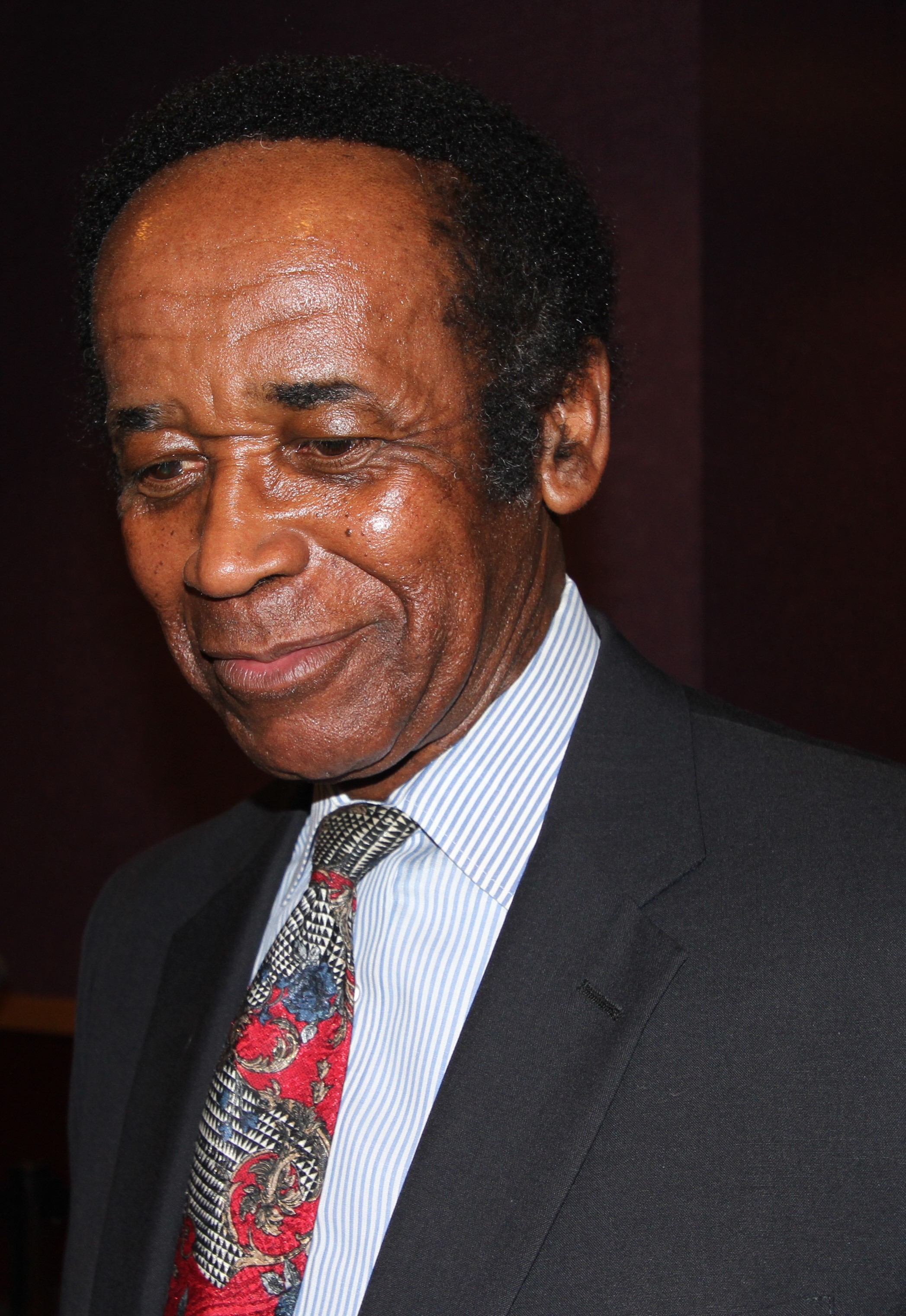
- Washington in 2018

No. 84
- Position: Wide receiver

Personal information
- Born: January 25, 1944 (age 82); La Porte, Texas, U.S.
- Listed height: 6 ft 3 in (1.91 m)
- Listed weight: 208 lb (94 kg)

Career information
- High school: George Washington Carver (Baytown, Texas)
- College: Michigan State (1964–1966)
- NFL draft: 1967: 1st round, 8th overall pick

Career history
- Minnesota Vikings (1967–1972); Denver Broncos (1973)

Awards and highlights
- NFL champion (1969); Second-team All-Pro (1969); 2× Pro Bowl (1969, 1970); 50 Greatest Vikings; 2× First-team All-American (1965, 1966); 2× First-team All-Big Ten (1965, 1966)

Career NFL statistics
- Receptions: 182
- Receiving yards: 3,237
- Receiving touchdowns: 26
- Stats at Pro Football Reference
- College Football Hall of Fame

Eugene Washington (born January 25, 1944) is an American former professional football player who was a wide receiver in the National Football League (NFL). He played for the Minnesota Vikings (1967–1972) and the Denver Broncos (1973). He was one of two wide receivers in the NFL with the same name during the last five year of his career as an active player; they were never teammates.

== Early life ==
Washington was born in 1944 at La Porte, Texas. Because of segregation and La Porte having no black high school he attended George Washington Carver High School in Baytown, Texas.

== Michigan State ==
Washington enrolled at Michigan State University in 1963. He played college football for the Michigan State Spartans football program from 1963 to 1966. He also ran track as well as playing football for the Spartans and was the 1965 NCAA indoor champion for 60-yard hurdles.

As a sophomore in 1964, he had 35 catches for 542 yards and five touchdowns.

As a junior, he starred for the 1965 Michigan State Spartans football team that was recognized as the national champion in the UPI coaches poll. Washington was the leading receiver for the 1965 team, totaling 40 catches for 638 yards and four touchdowns.

As a senior, Washington helped lead the 1966 Michigan State team to an undefeated 9–0–1 record and the No 2 ranking in both the AP and UPI polls. He had 27 catches for 677 yards and seven touchdowns for the 1966 team.

== Professional career ==
Washington was selected by the Minnesota Vikings in the first round, with the eighth overall pick, in the 1967 NFL draft. He was also drafted by the Indiana Pacers in the last round of the inaugural 1967 American Basketball Association draft, though he never played professional basketball for the Pacers or anyone else. As a rookie, Washington averaged 29.5 yards per reception. In 1968, he caught 46 passes. In 1969, Washington had 821 receiving yards and nine touchdowns. Washington made the Pro Bowl in 1969 and 1970. He played in Super Bowl IV (one catch for nine yards) after the 1969 NFL season. The Vikings were upset by the Kansas City Chiefs, 23–7, on January 11, 1970, at Tulane Stadium in New Orleans. Washington was one of the fifteen plaintiffs in Mackey v. National Football League in which Judge Earl R. Larson declared that the Rozelle rule was a violation of antitrust laws on December 30, 1975. He is the subject of the documentary, Through the Banks of the Red Cedar, written and directed by his daughter Maya Washington.

== NFL career statistics ==
Legend
| | Won the NFL championship |
| | Led the league |
| **Bold** | Career high |

=== Regular season ===
| Year | Team | Games | | Receiving | | | | |
| Year | Team | GP | GS | Rec | Yds | Avg | Lng | TD |
|---|---|---|---|---|---|---|---|---|
| 1967 | MIN | **14** | 4 | 13 | 384 | **29.5** | **85** | 2 |
| 1968 | MIN | **14** | **14** | **46** | 756 | 16.4 | 61 | 6 |
| 1969 | MIN | **14** | **14** | 39 | **821** | 21.1 | 83 | **9** |
| 1970 | MIN | **14** | **14** | 44 | 702 | 16.0 | 49 | 4 |
| 1971 | MIN | 13 | 9 | 12 | 165 | 13.8 | 51 | 0 |
| 1972 | MIN | 12 | 11 | 18 | 259 | 14.4 | 39 | 2 |
| 1973 | DEN | **14** | 0 | 10 | 150 | 15.0 | 28 | 3 |
| Career | | 95 | 66 | 182 | 3,237 | 17.8 | 85 | 26 |
