= University of Florida Athletic Hall of Fame =

- Awarded for: Excellence in college sports
- Date: October 9, 2026 (next induction)
- Location: Gainesville, Florida
- Country: United States
- Presented by: University of Florida Lettermen's Association (F Club)
- Reward: Honorary
- Website: F Club

The University of Florida Athletic Hall of Fame includes over 300 former Florida Gators athletes who represented the University of Florida in one or more intercollegiate sports and were recognized as "Gator Greats" for their athletic excellence during their college sports careers. The University of Florida, located in Gainesville, Florida, is a member of the Southeastern Conference (SEC), and fields twenty-one intercollegiate sports teams, all of which compete in Division I of the National Collegiate Athletic Association (NCAA).

Gator Greats are listed below in alphabetical order within each sport. Those listed include athletes from nine men's sports and nine women's sports. This list also includes "Distinguished Letterwinners", who are former Gators athletes who achieved distinction after graduation, as athletic coaches or administrators, professional athletes, or in public service or other career activities; and "Honorary Letterwinners," who were not former Gators athletes, but who distinguished themselves by their significant contributions to the success of the Florida Gators sports teams, including former championship Gators coaches. Distinguished Letterwinners and Honorary Letterwinners are listed below in alphabetical order in separate sections near the end of this article.

The Hall of Fame's Class of 2013 included Gator Greats Jeff Davis (wrestling), Josh Fogg (baseball), Rex Grossman (football), Riko Higashio (women's golf), Heather Mitts (women's soccer), Mike Pearson (football), and Chrissy Van Fleet (women's gymnastics); Honorary Letterwinner Ernestine Weaver (women's gymnastics coach); and Distinguished Letterwinner Larry Morris (football). The Class of 2014 included Gator Greats Aury Cruz (volleyball), Jenny Gladding (softball), Justin O'Neal (men's tennis), Keiwan Ratliff (football), Colleen Rosensteel (women's track and field), Mike Stanley (baseball) and Sarah Yohe (women's soccer), and Distinguished Letterwinner Harry Wilder (men's swimming).

The Class of 2015 included seven Gator Greats: Camilo Benedetti (men's golf), Matt Bonner (men's basketball), Beth Farmer (women's cross country; women's track and field), Nicole McCray (volleyball), Candice Scott (women's track and field), Camilo Villegas (men's golf), and Stephanie Zunich Donley (women's swimming). They were inducted on April 10, 2015.

== Baseball ==
The following Gator Greats are former members of the Florida Gators baseball team:

Name	Sport	Years	Accomplishments
Robert F. Barnes	Baseball	1953, 1956, 1958	In a college career interrupted by military service, Bobby Barnes lettered in 1953, 1956 and 1958. He was a first-team All-Southeastern Conference (SEC) selection twice—first as catcher, then as outfielder, and led the Gators with twenty runs scored in 1958.
Cecil Beck	Football; Track & field Baseball	1925–27; 1926–27; 1926–28	Three-sport letterman Cecil Beck was a 100- and 200-yard sprinter nicknamed "Jack Rabbit". In football, the halfback memorably lifted his team over Washington & Lee with a 55-yard touchdown run; in baseball, the center fielder's swift base-running and heavy bat won him a contract with the Boston Braves. Beck was also a Phi Beta Kappa and two-time recipient of the Norris Trophy as the university's outstanding scholar-athlete.
Harry L. Coe III	Baseball	1951–52	Pitcher Harry Coe was an All-SEC selection in 1952. After his college career, he played four seasons of minor league baseball and put himself through law school. Coe later served as a circuit court judge and state attorney in Hillsborough County, Florida.
Douglas M. Corbett	Baseball	1971–74	Pitcher Doug Corbett was an All-SEC selection in 1974. He made his Major League Baseball (MLB) debut with the Minnesota Twins in 1980, and played eight MLB seasons with the Twins, the California Angels and the Baltimore Orioles. Corbett was an American League All-Star in 1981.
David M. Eckstein	Baseball	1994–97	Infielder David Eckstein was a walk-on player who garnered All-SEC and All-American honors, and was a member of the Gators' 1996 College World Series team. In 1997, he compiled eighty-five runs, 125 runs batted in, and thirty-five stolen bases. He made his MLB debut with the Anaheim Angels in 2001, and in ten MLB seasons, he earned two World Series rings, and 2006 World Series MVP honors.
Joshua S. Fogg	Baseball	1995–98	Pitcher Josh Fogg received All-SEC and consensus first-team All-American honors, and was a member of the Gators' 1996 College World Series team. He made his MLB debut with the Chicago White Sox in 2001, and subsequently played for the Pittsburgh Pirates, Colorado Rockies and Cincinnati Reds.
Matthew V. LaPorta	Baseball	2004–07	First baseman Matt LaPorta was a two-time first-team All-American, two-time first-team All-SEC, and two-time SEC Player of the Year (2005, 2007). He led the NCAA in 2005 with 26 home runs, coinciding in an appearance in the College World Series final against Texas. After his UF career, he was a member of the 2008 Summer Olympics team that won a bronze medal and played 4 years in the MLB with the Cleveland Indians.
Perry C. McGriff Jr.	Baseball; Football	1958–60; 1958–59	Outfielder Perry McGriff was a two-time All-SEC selection and the Gators' first-ever two-time All-American in baseball. He also received All-SEC and All-American honors in football. McGriff was later elected to the Florida House of Representatives.
Tom Moore	Baseball	1960, 1962–63	Third baseman Tom Moore was a two-time All-SEC selection and a two-time first-team All-American. In 1962 and 1963, Moore led the Gators in batting average, hits and stolen bases. He still holds the team records for stolen bases in a single game and triples in a season.
Louis Pesce	Baseball	1952–54	First baseman Lou Pesce was an All-SEC selection in 1954.
Robert G. Pitman	Baseball; Basketball	1931–33; 1931–33	Bob Pitman was the third baseman for the Gators in the early 1930s and received honorable mention All-American honors after leading the team with a .350 batting average. He later served as the backfield coach for the Gators football team from 1942 to 1945, and the head baseball coach in 1945.
Quintus I. Roberts	Baseball	1931–33	Q. I. Roberts was a standout Florida Gators baseball player from 1931 to 1933. Roberts became an educator and coach in the public schools of Putnam County, Florida.
Logan M. Shore	Baseball	2014–16	Logan Shore emerged as one of Florida's premier ace pitchers during his time in Gainesville. The 2014 SEC Freshman of the Year and 2016 SEC Player of the Year, Shore ranks second in UF history with 30 victories and seventh with 248 strikeouts. He was later drafted by the Oakland Athletics in 2016 and played 7 seasons of minor league baseball.
R. Rudy Simpson Jr.	Baseball	1951–54	Pitcher Rudy Simpson was the Gators' first scholarship baseball player in 1951. Simpson was an All-SEC selection in 1954.
R. Michael Stanley	Baseball	1982–85	Catcher Mike Stanley was a member of the SEC All-Tournament Team in 1982, 1984 and 1985, and was a key member of the Gators' SEC regular season and tournament championship teams in 1982 and 1984. Often serving as the team's designated hitter, Stanley still holds the team records for runs scored and runs batted in. He played fifteen MLB seasons for the Texas Rangers, New York Yankees, Boston Red Sox, Toronto Blue Jays and Oakland Athletics.
Haywood C. Sullivan	Baseball; Football	1951–52; 1950–51	Haywood Sullivan was a two-sport standout in baseball and football, and is generally rated as the best passing quarterback of the first fifty-five years of the Gators football program. His equally strong baseball talent led to him receiving a Major League Baseball bonus contract from the Boston Red Sox in 1952, and he rose from team catcher, to general manager, and ultimately, to general partner of the Red Sox franchise.
E. Burton Touchberry	Baseball; Basketball	1954–57; 1954–57	Burt Touchberry was a two-sport star in baseball and basketball. In baseball, he was a three-year starting pitcher and an All-SEC selection. As a senior in 1957, he pitched ten games, with twenty-eight strikeouts and an earned run average of 0.81—still the best single season ERA in Gators history.
Preston M. Tucker	Baseball	2009–12	The all-time hits leader with 341, Preston Tucker made 2 All-American and All-SEC teams. He holds career records in at-bats, doubles, RBI, and total bases, while being second in games played, starts, home runs, and runs scored. The only Gator to make 4 straight Regional All-Tournament Teams, Tucker won 2 SEC titles and 2 Regional MOPs on his way to powering the three straight College World Series appearances from 2010 to 2012, including a national runner-up finish in 2011. Tucker played 6 seasons in the MLB & KBO.
Marc C. Valdes	Baseball	1991–93	Marc Valdes ranks first or second in most major Florida pitching categories. The career leader in wins (31), starts (55), and innings pitched (394.2), Valdes threw for a career 3.13 ERA and 351 strikeouts, second all-time. After a freshman All-America appearance and College World Series appearance in 1991, Valdes pitched for 10 years in the MLB & NPB.
S. Bradley Wilkerson	Baseball	1996–98	Brad Wilkerson was an outfielder, a first baseman, and a three-time first-team All-American. In three years as a Gator, he compiled fifty-five home runs, 224 runs batted in, and forty-six stolen bases. After college, he won a gold medal as a member of the winning U.S. national team at the 2000 Olympics. He made his MLB debut with the Montreal Expos in 2001, and played eight MLB seasons.
Dale J. Willis	Baseball	1954–56	Pitcher Dale Willis was an All-SEC selection in 1956. As a senior, Willis posted three consecutive games with ten or more strikeouts, and averaged 11.9 strikeouts per game. Willis made his MLB debut with the Kansas City Athletics in 1963.
Michael A. Zunino	Baseball	2010–12	Catcher Mike Zunino became the first Gator to win the Golden Spikes Award, doing so in 2012. A two-time first-team All-American and 2011 SEC Player of the Year, he compiled 47 home runs, 175 RBIs, and a .327 batting average while at Florida. He played 11 seasons in the MLB, being named an All-Star in 2021.

== Men's basketball ==
The following Gator Greats are former members of the Florida Gators men's basketball team:

Name	Sport	Years	Accomplishments
Matthew R. Bonner	Basketball	1999–2003	Forward & center Matt Bonner was a three-time All-SEC selection and was named an honorable mention All-American twice. He later went on to play 13 years in the NBA, winning 2 titles with the San Antonio Spurs.
Corey W. Brewer	Basketball	2004–07	Forward Corey Brewer was a key member of the back-to-back national championship teams of 2006 & 2007, winning Final Four Most Outstanding Player in 2007. The first Gator to record a triple-double in program history, Brewer finished his career with 176 steals, the seventh-most in history. He went to play 13 years in the NBA, winning the 2011 NBA championship with the Dallas Mavericks.
Richard J. Casares	Basketball; Football	1951–53; 1951–53	Guard Rick Casares was a two-sport standout in basketball and football. In basketball, he was the Gators' leading scorer for two straight seasons, a two-time All-SEC selection, and a team captain. In 1951, he hit 13-of-13 field goal attempts against Georgia Tech. Casares was drafted by the Chicago Bears and played professional football for twelve seasons.
W. N. "Ben" Clemons	Football; Basketball; Baseball	1928–30; 1929–31; 1930–32	Ben Clemons was a three-sport standout athlete who played for the Florida Gators football, basketball and baseball teams for three years as a collegian. After his undergraduate career, Clemons returned as the basketball team's head coach from 1933 to 1936, the baseball team's head coach from 1934 to 1936, and an assistant football coach from 1933 to 1935.
Daniel C. Cross Jr.	Basketball	1992–95	Guard Dan Cross was a two-time first-team All-SEC selection, received All-American honors twice, and was a senior team captain. Memorably, Cross made a layup at the buzzer to defeat James Madison and advance in the 1994 NCAA Tournament, and was a major factor in the Gators' run to their first-ever NCAA Final Four in 1994. He led the team in scoring during the 1993–94 and 1994–95 seasons.
A. Curtis Cunkle Jr.	Basketball	1951–53	Forward Curt Cunkle played in sixty-one games, scored 604 points, recovered 493 rebounds, and was a first-team All-SEC selection in 1953.
Andrew D. DeClercq	Basketball	1991–95	Forward-center Andrew DeClercq started 128 consecutive games for the Gators, still a program record. A three-time All-SEC selection, DeClercq's 958 career rebounds and 176 career blocks rank third and sixth all-time and were key in helping the Gators make their first Final Four appearance in 1994.
Robert E. Emrick	Basketball	1954–57	Forward-center Bob Emrick played in ninety-one games, scored 1,535 points, made 514 free throws, and pulled down 869 rebounds. He was a two-time All-SEC selection, and a senior team captain. Emrick led the team in scoring for three seasons, averaged 16.7 points per game, and remains tenth on the Gators' career scoring list.
Taurean J. Green	Basketball	2004–07	Guard Taurean Green was a two-time second-team All-SEC selection and honorable mention All-American in 2007. He was a key member of the back-to-back national championship teams of 2006 & 2007, winning MVP of the SEC tournament in 2006. He accumulated 1,174 points, 242 rebounds, 400 assists and 124 steals during his career.
Udonis J. Haslem	Basketball	1999–2002	Center Udonis Haslem scored 1,781 career points, made 515 free throws, recovered 861 rebounds, and remains fourth on the Gators' all-time scoring list. He was the first player in Gators basketball history to play in four consecutive NCAA Tournaments. Haslem was a two-time first-team All-SEC selection, received All-American honors three times, and was a senior team captain. He played all twenty seasons of his NBA career with the Miami Heat, where he was on all 3 of the Heat's NBA championship teams.
Brooks Henderson	Basketball	1963–65	Guard Brooks Henderson played in sixty-six games, scored 1,001 points, pulled down 365 rebounds, and made 83.0 percent of his free throws. Henderson was a three-time All-SEC selection, and received All-American honors as a senior team captain.
Joe Hobbs	Basketball	1956–58	Guard Joe Hobbs was a first-team All-SEC selection, an All-American, and a senior team captain. He scored 1,331 points, completed 84.3 percent of his free throws, and averaged 23.9 points per game as a senior. Memorably, he scored forty-one points against Georgia in 1958—still one of the four highest-scoring performances in team history. Hobbs was the first Gator to receive All-American basketball honors.
Alfred J. Horford Reynoso	Basketball	2004–07	Center Al Horford was a two-time All-American, 2006 SEC Tournament MVP and the man in the middle on the 2006 & 2007 national championship teams. He left Florida with 1,123 points, 869 rebounds (tied for 6th all-time), 187 assists, 94 steals, and 189 blocks (4th all-time). So far, he has played 18 seasons in the NBA, making 5 All-Star teams and winning the 2024 NBA championship with the Boston Celtics.
Gary J. Keller	Basketball	1965–67	Center-forward Gary Keller led the team in scoring during the 1965–66 and 1966–67 seasons. In three seasons, he played in seventy-six games, scored 1,104 points, and recovered 855 rebounds. Keller was a first-team All-SEC selection and an Academic All-American. He played two seasons in the ABA.
David Lee	Basketball	2001–05	Forward-center David Lee was a two-time second-team All-SEC selection and member of the 2005 SEC Tournament winning team, the first time in program history. He finished his career with 1,436 points and 869 rebounds, which is tied for sixth all-time. He played 13 years in the NBA, making 2 All-Star teams & winning the 2015 NBA championship with the Golden State Warriors.
Vernon Maxwell	Basketball	1984–88	The all-time leader in UF history with 2,450 points and 206 steals, homegrown guard Vernon Maxwell (Buchholz HS/Gainesville) was a three-time all-SEC selection with the Gators. After helping lead the Gators to their first two NCAA Tournament appearance, he catapulted an already stellar college career into a 13-year NBA career, helping lead the Houston Rockets to back-to-back championships in 1994 & 1995.
Michael L. Miller	Basketball	1998–2000	Mike Miller will go down in basketball history as one of the most underrated shooters ever. A freshman All-American in 1998, his first-team All-SEC selection and last-second floater over Butler to avoid a first-round upset led to the Gators' first national championship appearance in 2000. This outstanding college career led to an even more successful 18-year NBA career, winning Rookie of the Year in 2001, Sixth Man of the Year in 2006 and back-to-back championships with the Miami Heat in 2012 & 2013.
Tony Miller	Basketball	1971–73	Guard Tony Miller led the Gators in scoring for three straight years, and led the SEC during the 1971–72 season with an average of 26.7 points per game. He was a first-team All-SEC selection, a senior team captain, an Academic All-American, and the recipient of an NCAA Post-Graduate Scholarship. Miller still holds the team record for most points scored in a single game (54). In three seasons, he scored 1,382 points.
Andrew Moten	Basketball	1983–87	Guard Andrew Moten helped lead the Gators to their first NCAA tournament appearance in 1987. The 1984 SEC Freshman of the Year, Moten made three All-SEC teams on his way to scoring 1,930 points, fourth-most all-time. Moten was selected in the fourth round of the 1987 NBA Draft by the New Jersey Nets, but did not play. He coaches high school basketball at West Gadsden High School.
Joakim S. Noah	Basketball	2004–07	Center Joakim Noah will forever be a household name for Gator fans, making 2 first-team All-SEC teams, second-team All-American in 2007, winning back-to-back national titles, and being named the 2006 Final Four Most Outstanding Player. He finished his 3-year career with 1,133 points, 687 rebounds, 95 steals and 186 blocks, the latter being the fifth-most in program history. Noah then had a superb 14-year NBA career, making 2 All-Star teams, 3 All-Defensive teams and the 2014 Defensive Player of the Year award.
Andrew Owens	Basketball	1968–70	Forward Andy Owens was a two-time first-team All-SEC selection, an All-American, an Academic All-American, a senior team captain, and an NCAA Post-Graduate Scholarship recipient. He scored 1,445 career points, and averaged 27.0 points per game during the 1969–70 season—still the team record. Owens was picked in the 1970 NBA Draft, attended law school after a brief pro career, and became a lawyer and circuit court judge.
Chandler E. Parsons	Basketball	2007–11	Forward Chandler Parsons was the 2011 SEC Player of the Year, becoming the first Gator to win the honor. He led the Gators to an SEC Championship win and Elite Eight appearance that year. He later played in the NBA for 10 years.
Hans Tanzler	Basketball	1947–50	Guard Hans Tanzler played in 100 games, led the Gators in scoring during the 1947–48 season, and scored 1,221 career points. He was an All-SEC selection, and a senior team captain. Tanzler was later elected mayor of the City of Jacksonville.
Neal E. Walk	Basketball	1967–69	Center Neal Walk was a two-time first-team All-SEC selection, a two-time All-American, and a senior team captain. He led the nation in rebounds per game during the 1967–68 season. In his three-year college career, he scored 1,600 points, completed 456 free throws, and pulled down 1,181 rebounds. The Phoenix Suns picked Walk in the first round of the 1969 NBA Draft, and he played in the NBA for eight seasons.
Scottie J. Wilbekin	Basketball	2010–14	Guard Scottie Wilbekin won the 2014 SEC Player of the Year award, SEC Tournament MVP, and NCAA Regional Most Outstanding Player, becoming the only Gator to do so on his way to leading Florida to yet another Final Four appearance. A 2-time All-SEC honoree, he is still top 10 in games played, assists and steals in program history. He has had a successful pro career in Europe since leaving UF, winning the Turkish Cup, 3 Israeli Premier League championships, and the 2018 EuroCup while also being regular and postseason MVP.
Chip Williams	Basketball	1973–75	Center Chip Williams was a first-team All-SEC selection and a senior team captain. In three seasons as a Gator, he played in seventy-six games, led the team in scoring during the 1973–74 season, scored 1,246 points, completed 72.4 percent of his free throws, and recovered 775 rebounds.
Ronnie Williams	Basketball	1980–84	Forward Ronnie Williams was a four-year starter, the SEC Freshman of the Year, a four-time All-SEC selection, and a senior team captain. He led the Gators in scoring for four consecutive seasons, scored 2,090 career points (current team record) while completing 58.5 percent of his field goal attempts, pulled down 954 rebounds, and hit 546 free throws (current team record).

== Women's basketball ==
The following Gator Greats are former members of the Florida Gators women's basketball team:

Name	Sport	Years	Accomplishments
Quientella D. Bonner	Basketball	1977–81	In her four years as a Gator, Quientella Bonner scored 1,798 points while shooting fifty-four percent from the floor, and pulling down 1,321 rebounds. Bonner finished her college career as the all-time leading scorer in the history of the Gators women's basketball program, and remains sixth on the Gators' career records list.
Tammy E. Jackson	Basketball	1982–85	Tammy Jackson was a three-time first-team All-SEC selection. During her four-year Gators career, she scored 1,895 points, recovered 1,141 rebounds, and blocked 121 shots on defense. She is the third leading scorer in Lady Gators basketball history. Jackson was a member of the U.S. national teams that won a world championship in 1990, and an Olympic bronze medal in 1992. She also played in the WNBA for six years.
DeLisha Milton-Jones	Basketball	1994–97	Delisha Milton was a two-time first-team All-SEC selection, and a first-team All-American. She scored 1,858 points, pulled down 1,109 rebounds, made 172 blocks, and remains fourth on the Gators' career scoring list. She was the SEC Player of the Year, and the recipient of the Wade Trophy. She was a U.S. national team member and won two Olympic gold medals. She also played in the WNBA for twelve seasons.
LaMurriel Page	Basketball	1995–98	In her four seasons as a Gator, Murriel Page scored 1,915 points, completed fifty-five percent of her field attempts, and recovered 1,251 rebounds. She was a two-time first-team All-SEC selection, and a first-team All-American. Page remains the second leading scorer in Lady Gators history. She was selected third overall in the 1998 WNBA Draft, and played eight seasons in the WNBA.
Sophia L. Witherspoon	Basketball	1989–91	During her three-year college career, guard Sophia Witherspoon scored 1,381 points, pulled down 445 rebounds, and was recognized as a first-team All-SEC selection. Witherspoon was selected with the seventh pick overall in the 1997 WNBA Draft, and played seven seasons in the WNBA.

== Boxing ==
The following Gator Greats are former members of the Florida Gators men's boxing team:

Name	Sport	Years	Accomplishments
John G. Joca	Boxing	1939–40	Boxer Johnny Joca won the NCAA national boxing championship in the 135-pound weight class in 1940. Joca was the first Florida Gators athlete, in any sport, to win an individual NCAA national championship.
Phillip D. O'Connell	Boxing	1929–30; 1930–31	Phil O'Connell was the captain of the University of Florida boxing team for two years. During his professional welterweight boxing career, he compiled a record of six wins (one by knockout), two losses, and one draw. Afterward, he became a lawyer, municipal judge, and state's attorney.
Carlos R. Proctor	Football; Boxing	1929–30; 1930–31	Carlos Proctor was a Gator heavyweight boxer as an undergraduate, and then served as the team's head coach until the boxing program was suspended during World War II. During his brief professional boxing career, Proctor posted two wins, both by knockout, with no losses. He was also a two-year letterman for the football team, and served as an assistant football coach for seven seasons during the 1930s.

== Football ==
The following Gator Greats are former members of the Florida Gators football team:

Name	Sport	Years	Accomplishments
Frederic M. Abbott	Football	1970–72	As the Gators' senior team captain in 1972, linebacker Fred Abbott was a first-team All-SEC selection, an Associated Press All-American, and the recipient of the team's Fergie Ferguson Award. Remarkably, he had switched from playing offensive guard as a junior to playing middle linebacker as a senior. The Minnesota Vikings picked Abbott in the 1973 NFL Draft.
Carlos Alvarez	Football	1969–71	Wide receiver Carlos Alvarez was one of the 1969 Gators' second-year stars known as the "Super Sophs," and set single season NCAA receiving records in virtually every category. He was recognized as a first team All-SEC selection and a consensus first-team All-American. Alvarez was also a three-time Academic All-American, and is a member of the Academic All-American Hall of Fame and the College Football Hall of Fame.
C. Neal Anderson	Football	1982–85	Running back Neal Anderson was a first-team All-SEC selection, and a two-time All-American. In his four years as a Gator, he had fourteen games with 100 yards or more rushing; 639 carries for 3,234 yards rushing and thirty touchdowns; forty-nine receptions for 525 yards receiving and two touchdowns; and ninety-seven yards passing. The Chicago Bears selected Anderson in the first round of the 1986 NFL Draft, and he was a named an All-Pro four times during his eight-year professional career.
Reidel C. Anthony	Football	1994–96	As a junior wide receiver, Reidel Anthony was a first-team All-SEC selection and a consensus first-team All-American. He played a key role in the Gators' 12–1 national championship season in 1996, catching seventy-two passes to lead the SEC with 1,293 yards, and setting a new SEC regular season record with eighteen touchdown catches. The Tampa Buccaneers drafted Anthony in the first round of the 1997 NFL Draft.
Raymond L. "Trace"; Armstrong III	Football	1989	Trace Armstrong was a rare senior transfer who played only a single season at defensive tackle for the Gators, but it was a memorable one, as he set a new Gators single-season record by making nineteen tackles for a loss, including seven quarterback sacks. Armstrong was recognized as a first-team All-SEC selection and a first-team All-American. The Chicago Bears picked him in the first round of the 1990 NFL Draft, and Armstrong recorded over 100 sacks in his fifteen-year professional career.
John Barrow	Football	1954–56	John Barrow was a two-way offensive and defensive lineman for the Gators in the mid-1950s. As a senior, he was recognized as first-team All-SEC selection and a first-team All-American. Drafted by the NFL's Detroit Lions, he chose to play in the CFL instead, and was a thirteen-time CFL All-Star and a member of four Grey Cup championship teams. He is a member of the Canadian Football Hall of Fame.
James E. Beaver	Football	1959–61	Offensive lineman Jim Beaver was a two-time All-SEC selection, a senior team captain, and the recipient of the Gators' Fergie Ferguson Award. He was drafted by the NFL's Philadelphia Eagles and the AFL's Buffalo Bills in 1963.
Jack H. Beckwith	Football	1933–35	Jack Beckwith was a standout halfback and fullback for the Gators from 1933 to 1935. As a sophomore in 1933, Beckwith turned in a memorable rushing and punting performance against Auburn that was the difference in the Gators' 14–7 homecoming victory.
Douglas R. Belden	Basketball; Baseball; Football	1944–45; 1945, 1947–48; 1946–48	Doug Belden was a versatile three-sport letterman during a college career interrupted by military service. In football, he was the Gators' leading passer in 1947 and 1948. He later played three seasons as a quarterback for the Saskatchewan Roughriders of the CFL.
Kerwin D. Bell	Football	1984–87	Quarterback Kerwin Bell was a walk-on player who was eighth on the depth chart as a freshman. He subsequently earned an athletic scholarship, the starting position, a first-team All-SEC selection and All-American honors. In 1984 and 1985, he led the Gators to their first two SEC first-place finishes. Bell finished his college career with 549 completions for 7,585 yards and fifty-six touchdowns. Bell played professional football for all or part of twelve seasons, then became a successful college football coach.
L. Bruce Bennett Jr.	Football	1963–65	As a senior team captain in 1965, defensive back Bruce Bennett was a first-team All-SEC selection and a United Press International first-team All-American, and led the Gators to their first-ever major bowl game. His thirteen career interceptions set a new Gators team record. After college, Bennett played for the CFL's Saskatchewan Roughriders for seven seasons, including their 1966 Grey Cup championship team.
Lee Roy "Red" Bethea	Football	1928–30	As a senior team captain in 1930, Red Bethea rushed for 218 yards against the University of Chicago Maroons football team—still the third highest single-game rushing total in Gators history. He was named to the All-Southern team and was a second-team All-American in 1930.
Ernest J. "Goof" Bowyer	Football	1926–28	Goof Bowyer was the senior team captain of the great Florida Gators football team of 1928. Bowyer's '28 Gators led the nation with 336 points and finished 8–1—the best season win–loss record in the first fifty-four years of Gators football.
Scot E. Brantley	Football; Baseball	1976–79; 1977	Linebacker Scot Brantley was a two-time first-team All-SEC selection and twice received All-American honors. Remembered for his physical play, he led the Gators in tackles during two seasons, and his career total of 467 tackles still ranks second in the Gators' records book. Brantley's senior season was cut short by a severe concussion, but he later had a successful eight-year NFL career with the Tampa Bay Buccaneers.
Alex J. Brown	Football	1998–2001	Alex Brown was a defensive end and a member of the Gators' 2000 SEC championship team. He was a three-time first-team All-SEC selection, and a consensus first-team All-American. In four years as a Gator, Brown totaled 161 tackles, with forty-seven tackles for a loss and thirty-three quarterback sacks—still the best in Gators team history. Brown was drafted by the Chicago Bears and enjoyed a nine-year NFL career.
Lomas Brown Jr.	Football	1981–84	Lomas Brown anchored the "Great Wall of Florida" offensive line and paved the way for the Gators' first undefeated SEC season in 1984. He was a first-team All-SEC selection, consensus first-team All-American, and the SEC's Jacobs Blocking Trophy winner. The Detroit Lions selected him in the first round of the 1985 NFL Draft, and he received numerous Pro Bowl and All-Pro honors during his eighteen-year NFL career.
Carl L. Brumbaugh	Football	1927–28	Carl Brumbaugh was a quarterback and halfback who was a member of the 1928 Gators' "Phantom Four" backfield that set a new single-season national scoring record off 336 points, while posting an 8–1 win–loss record—the best record in Gators history until that time. Brumbaugh played professionally for the Chicago Bears and was a member of two of the Bears' NFL championship teams.
Glenn S. Cameron	Football	1971–74	Linebacker Glenn Cameron was a first-team All-SEC selection and an Associated Press All-American. The Cincinnati Bengals selected him in the first round of the 1975 NFL Draft, and he played 159 games for the Bengals during his eleven NFL seasons—including Super Bowl XVI. After Cameron retired from professional football, he returned to the University of Florida and earned a law degree.
Kevin L. Carter	Football	1991–94	Kevin Carter was a standout defensive end, and was a member of the Gators' first three SEC championship football teams in 1991, 1993 and 1994. As a senior, he was a first-team All-SEC selection, a consensus first-team All-American, and was recognized by 'Football News as its Defensive Player of the Year. The St. Louis Rams selected Carter in the first round of the 1995 NFL Draft, and he played fourteen NFL seasons.
William C. Carr III	Football	1964–66	Center Bill Carr started thirty-two consecutive games in his three seasons on the Gators varsity. As a senior in 1966, he was a first-team All-SEC selection, a first-team All-American, and the offensive team captain. He and his roommate, quarterback Steve Spurrier, led the Gators to their first-ever major bowl game victory in the 1967 Orange Bowl. Later, Carr went into sports administration and served as the athletic director at the University of Florida and the University of Houston.
Richard J. Casares	Football; Basketball	1951–53; 1952–53	Halfback Rick Casares was the Gators' leading rusher and an All-SEC selection in 1952, spurring the team to an 8–3 season and their first-ever bowl game. Casares, who was also a placekicker, scored a touchdown and two extra points in the team's 14–13 Gator Bowl win. Casares was drafted by the Chicago Bears and was named to five Pro Bowls over twelve NFL seasons. He led the NFL in rushing yards in 1956 and was the Bears' career rusher leader until his record was eclipsed by Walter Payton.
Charles A. Casey	Football; Baseball	1963–65; 1965	Wide receiver Charley Casey was a two-time first-team All-SEC selection, a first-team All-American, and the recipient of the Gators' Fergie Ferguson Award. Casey had six games with 100 or more yards receiving, led the team in receiving yardage in 1964 and 1965, and finished his college career as the leading receiver in SEC history. He was drafted by the Atlanta Falcons.
Rainey Cawthon	Football	1927–29	Rainey Cawthon was a member of the 1928 Gators' "Phantom Four" backfield that led the nation in scoring with 336 points, while compiling an 8–1 win–loss record—the best in the first five decades of Gators football.
Donald G. Chandler	Football	1954–55	Don Chandler was a junior transfer who played halfback, punter and placekicker. As a senior in 1955, Chandler led all major college punters with an average kick of 44.3 yards, narrowly beating out Earl Morrall. Memorably, he booted a 76-yard punt in 1955—still tied for the second longest punt in Gators history. Chandler was drafted by the New York Giants, and played in twelve NFL seasons.
Wesley S. Chandler	Football	1974–77	An explosive receiver in the Gators' mid-1970s run-first offense, wide receiver Wes Chandler was a two-time first-team All-SEC selection, a two-time first-team All-American, a first-team Academic All-American, the recipient of the Gators' Fergie Ferguson Award, a senior team captain, and a member of the College Football Hall of Fame. The New Orleans Saints made him the third overall pick in the 1978 NFL Draft, and he compiled 8,966 receiving yards and sixty-seven touchdowns in eleven NFL seasons. He was named to four Pro Bowls and led the NFL in receiving yards and touchdowns in 1982 while playing for the San Diego Chargers.
William W. Chase	Football	1933–35	Billy Chase was an All-SEC selection and the senior team captain in 1935. Memorably, he returned a kickoff ninety-eight yards against Ole Miss in 1934.
Hagood Clarke III	Football	1961–63	Hagood Clarke was a walk-on defensive back, punter and punt returner. He led the Gators in punt return yardage in 1961 and 1962, booted 46 punts for 1,884 yards in 1962, and was the recipient of the Fergie Ferguson Award in 1963. The Buffalo Bills drafted him in 1964, and he played five years in the AFL—including the Bills' 1964 and 1965 AFL championship seasons. He earned All-AFL and AFL All-Star honors.
A. Cris Collinsworth	Football	1977–80	Recruited as an option quarterback, he achieved his greatest success as a converted wide receiver: three-time first-team All-SEC selection, first-team All-American, first-team Academic All-American, and senior team captain. The Cincinnati Bengals picked him in the second round of the 1981 NFL Draft, and he received numerous All-Pro and Pro Bowl honors during his eight-season NFL career.
William W. Corry	Football	1940–42	Fullback Bill Corry was a senior team captain in 1942.
Clyde Crabtree	Basketball; Football	1928–29; 1927–29	"Cannonball" Clyde Crabtree was a member of the "Phantom Four" backfield of the 1928 Gators team that scored 336 points (a new national single-season scoring record) and compiled an 8–1 win–loss record (the Gators' best-ever record until that time). Crabtree received All-American honors in 1928, and later played for two different NFL teams.
J. Broward "Brad" Culpepper	Football	1988–91	Brad Culpepper was a first-team All-SEC selection, a first-team All-American, and recipient of the 1991 Draddy Trophy, recognizing him as the outstanding student-athlete in college football. As a senior team captain, he led the Gators to their first officially recognized SEC championship in 1991. Culpepper was drafted by the Minnesota Vikings and played nine seasons in the NFL.
Joseph F. D'Agostino Jr.	Football	1951–53	A two-way offensive and defensive lineman, Joe D'Agostino was an honorable mention All-American and twice received first-team All-SEC honors. D'Agostino was a key member of the outstanding offensive line that paved the way for Gators backs Rick Casares, Papa Hall and Buford Long during the team's 1952 Gator Bowl season.
Judd D. Davis	Football	1992–94	Placekicker Judd Davis was a walk-on who earned first-team All-SEC and first-team All-American honors. He was the recipient of the Lou Groza Award, recognizing the best placekicker in college football, in 1993. Davis completed over eighty-two percent of his field goals attempts, and 121 of 129 point-after-touchdown (PAT) attempts, including all sixty-five of his PAT attempts in 1994.
Stephen J. DeLaTorre	Football	1952–55	Steve DeLaTorre was a two-way offensive center and linebacker. As a senior team captain in 1955, he was a first-team All-SEC selection and the recipient of the Gators' Fergie Ferguson Award.
J. Franklin Dempsey	Football	1946–49	Frank Dempsey was a standout two-way offensive and defensive lineman during the Gators' ironically named "Golden Era" of the late 1940s, and was a major factor in the rushing success of All-SEC tailback Chuck Hunsinger. After college, Dempsey played four seasons for the NFL's Chicago Bears, and two more seasons in the CFL, where he was named an Eastern All-Star in 1955.
Guy D. Dennis	Football	1966–68	Offensive lineman Guy Dennis was a two-time first-team All-SEC selection, a first-team All-American, a senior team captain, and a recipient of the team's Fergie Ferguson Award. Dennis was drafted by the Cincinnati Bengals, and he played seven NFL seasons for the Bengals and Detroit Lions.
Dwayne K. Dixon	Football	1980–83	Wide receiver Dwayne Dixon was a first-team All-SEC selection, an All-American, and the recipient of the Gators' Fergie Ferguson Award. He led the team in receiving yardage in 1982 and 1983. Dixon signed with the Tampa Bay Buccaneers in 1984, and enjoyed a seven-year professional career, before returning to Gainesville to become an assistant coach.
Christopher P. Doering	Football	1993–95	Wide receiver Chris Doering was a walk-on player who earned an athletic scholarship, a first-team All-SEC selection, and All-American honors. As a starter, he was a member of three consecutive SEC championship teams, and became a team captain as a senior. He finished his Gators career with 2,107 receiving yards and thirty-one touchdowns. After college, he played in the NFL for nine seasons.
Jimmy D. DuBose	Football	1973–75	Running back Jimmy DuBose rushed for 1,307 yards as a senior in 1975. He was a first-team All-SEC selection, the SEC Player of the Year, an All-American, and the recipient of the Gators' Fergie Ferguson Award. DuBose finished in fifth place in the 1975 Heisman Trophy balloting. A second-round draft pick of the Tampa Bay Buccaneers, his NFL career was cut short by a knee injury.
Lawrence W. Dupree	Football	1962–64	Fullback Larry Dupree was a senior team captain, three-time first-team All-SEC selection, first-team All-American, and recipient of the team's Fergie Ferguson Award. Dupree led the Gators in rushing yardage for three seasons, and finished his college career with 1,725 yards.
Thomas L. Durrance	Football	1969–71	Running back Tommy Durrance was one of the "Super Sophs" of 1969, and received a first-team All-SEC selection and All-American honors. During his sophomore season, he scored 110 points—then the team record, and still tied for second on the Gators' single-season records list. Durrance finished his three-year college career with 2,582 yards of combined rushing and receiving yardage.
J. Rex Farrior Sr.	Football; Baseball	1913–16; 1915–17	Rex Farrior was a two-sport athlete in football and baseball. A four-year football letterman and starter, he was the team's captain in 1916. Farrior later returned to the university to earn a law degree and served as the Gators' head baseball coach in 1924. He became a founding partner in a prominent Tampa-based law firm, and remained one of the biggest boosters of the Florida Gators sports program until his death.
Forest K. Ferguson Jr.	Football; Boxing	1939–41; 1942	As a two-way end, Fergie Ferguson set Gators career, season and game receiving records that would endure for over twenty years. As a senior in 1941, he received first-team All-SEC and honorable mention All-American honors. As a U.S. Army lieutenant, Ferguson received the Distinguished Service Cross for heroism under fire during the 1944 D-Day invasion; he was critically wounded and later died as a result. The Fergie Ferguson Award is named in his honor.
Donald D. Fleming	Football; Baseball	1956–58; 1958–60	A two-way defensive back and wide receiver, Don Fleming was the Gators' team captain in 1958, and finished his college football career as a first-team All-SEC selection. Coach Bob Woodruff ranked him as the Gators' best receiver of the 1950s. Fleming was signed by the Cleveland Browns in 1960, and was an All-NFL selection in 1962. His three-year professional career was cut short by his accidental death in 1963.
Robert G. Forbes	Football	1944–47	Back Bobby Forbes was an All-SEC selection in 1944, when he set a new Florida Field single-game rushing record with a 177-yard performance. Forbes' career was interrupted by World War II military service, but his post-war highlights included an 80-yard touchdown run against Auburn, and an 88-yard kickoff return versus Furman, both in 1947.
D. Jabar Gaffney	Football	1999–2001	A two-time first-team All-SEC selection, wide receiver Jabar Gaffney remains the only Gator to record 2 consecutive 1,000-yard receiving seasons. Winning SEC Freshman of the Year in 2000, Gaffney set NCAA freshman records for receiving yards & touchdowns that still stand today. Gaffney finished his UF career top 5 in all major receiving categories and had a 10-year career in the NFL.
Lawrence J. Gagner	Football	1963–65	Guard Larry Gagner was a first-team All-SEC selection in 1964 and 1965, and a first-team All-American in 1965. As a senior offensive lineman, Gagner participated in the 1966 Sugar Bowl, the Gators' first-ever major bowl appearance. Gagner was a second-round draft pick of the Pittsburgh Steelers and enjoyed a successful five-year NFL career.
David L. Galloway Sr.	Football	1977–80	Defensive tackle and end David Galloway was a star lineman under two different head coaches. As a junior, he was a key member of the Gators defense that led the biggest one-year turnaround in NCAA history. As a senior team captain in 1981, Galloway was a first-team All-SEC selection, and a first-team All-American. The St. Louis Cardinals picked Galloway in the second round of the 1982 NFL Draft, and he played in the NFL for nine seasons.
Max Goldstein	Football	1923–25	Goldy Goldstein was a standout lineman on the Gators teams of the mid-1920s, and received first-team All-Southern honors as a senior in 1925. Goldstein was among the first Gator alumni to ever play professional football.
Bobby Joe Green	Football; Track & field	1958–59; 1959–60	Bobby Joe Green was a punter and halfback. As a senior, he kicked fifty-four punts for an average distance of 44.9 yards—still the Gators' single-season record. His 82-yard punt against Georgia in 1958 remains the longest by a Gator in the modern era. Green was also a sprinter and high jumper on the Gators track and field team. After college, Green played in the NFL for fourteen seasons, and was a Pro Bowl selection in 1970.
D. Jacquez Green	Football	1995–97	Wide receiver and returner Jacquez Green was a consensus All-American and first-team All-Selection in 1997 after accumulating almost 1,450 total yards and 13 touchdowns. This electric play helped lead the Gators to their first national championship in 1996. Green finished top 10 in career receiving yards & touchdowns, as well as over 1,200 return yards and 4 touchdowns.
Samuel L. Green	Football	1972–75	Linebacker Sammy Green was a first-team All-SEC selection, a consensus first-team All-American, and a senior team captain. As a sophomore in 1973, he forced a critical fumble that led to a touchdown and the Gators' margin of victory in a 12–8 upset of the Auburn Tigers at home—the Gators' first-ever win at Jordan-Hare Stadium. The Seattle Seahawks drafted Green in the second round of the 1980 NFL Draft.
Rex D. Grossman III	Football	2000–02	Quarterback Rex Grossman was a first-team All-SEC selection, a consensus first-team All-American, and the runner-up for the Heisman Trophy as a sophomore in 2001. He led the Gators to an SEC championship in 2000, and threw for over 9,000 yards in his three-year career. The Chicago Bears drafted Grossman in the first round of the 2003 NFL draft, and he started in the Super Bowl for the Bears in 2007.
Joseph W. Haden III	Football	2007–09	Becoming the first freshman cornerback in Gator history to start a season opener, Joe Haden was named a consensus All-American and first-team All-SEC player in 2008. This elite play would culminate in a third national championship for the Gators later that year. Haden later went on to enjoy a successful 12-year career in the NFL, making 3 Pro Bowls.
J. Lewis "Papa" Hall Jr.	Football; Track & field	1950–52; 1951–53	Papa Hall and fellow backs Buford Long and Rick Casares formed the Gators' winning rushing attack during the team's 8–3 season in 1952, and he ran for ninety-four yards in the team's 14–13 Gator Bowl victory on New Year's Day. Hall was also an NCAA national champion high jumper in track and field. After college, he decided against a professional football career, and became an attorney and circuit court judge.
Malcolm E. Hammack	Football	1953–54	Mal Hammack was a two-way running back and linebacker. As a senior in 1954, he was an All-SEC selection and the first recipient of the Gators' Fergie Ferguson Award, recognizing the "senior football player who displays outstanding leadership, character and courage." Coach Bob Woodruff rated him as one of the Gators' five best offensive backs of the 1950s. Hammack was a fullback in the NFL for twelve seasons.
Vernon Hargreaves III	Football	2013–15	One of the most decorated college cornerbacks of the 2010s, Vernon Hargreaves was a two-time first-team All-American, three-time first-team All-SEC and finalist for the Jim Thorpe Award his junior year. Hargreaves finished his career with 121 tackles, ten interceptions and 28 pass breakups. He played six seasons in the NFL with Tampa Bay, Houston and Cincinnati.
W. Percival Harvin III	Football	2006–08	Percy Harvin was the elite weapon for Tim Tebow and the Florida offense during the three years he played for them. A two-time first-team All-American, 2006 SEC Freshman of the Year, and member of both the 2006 & 2008 national championship teams, Harvin finished his career with almost 3,800 career all-purpose yards and 32 touchdowns, both the most by a Florida wide receiver. Harvin went on to win the NFL Offensive Rookie of the Year & make the Pro Bowl in 2009, as well as returning the opening second-half kickoff 87 yards to help the Seahawks win Super Bowl XLVIII in an 8-year NFL career.
Velles A. Heckman	Football	1956–58	Vel Heckman was a standout two-way offensive and defensive tackle. As a senior in 1958, he was a first-team All-SEC selection and a first-team All-American. He was drafted by the San Francisco 49ers, but walked away from professional football to become a high school football coach.
Chas Henry	Football	2007–10	A three-time All-SEC punter, Chas Henry was named a consensus All-American in 2010, becoming the first Gator to win the Ray Guy Award. He finished his Gator career with the fourth-most punts (165) and yards (7,090), as well as 8th in punting average (43.0). In addition, Henry filled in as emergency placekicker that year, most notably kicking the 37-yard field goal to defeat rival Georgia in overtime.
Isaac J. Hilliard	Football	1994–96	Wide receiver Ike Hilliard was a first team All-SEC selection and a consensus first-team All-American as a junior in 1996. He and fellow All-American wideout Reidel Anthony both compiled over 1,000 receiving yards and were key factors in the Gators' offense during their 1996 national championship season. The New York Giants picked Hilliard in the first round of the 1997 NFL Draft, and he played in the NFL for twelve seasons.
Marcelino Huerta Jr.	Football	1947–49	Guard "Chelo" Huerta was a standout two-way lineman during one of the darkest times of Gators football, the ironically named "Golden Era" of the late 1940s. The stellar line play of Huerta and teammates Frank Dempsey and Jimmy Kynes was a major reason for the All-SEC success of running back Chuck Hunsinger. Huerta became a successful college head coach, and was inducted into the College Football Hall of Fame as a coach in 2002.
Charles R. Hunsinger	Football	1946–49	Halfback Chuck Hunsinger was one of the Gators' bright lights during the dismal "Golden Era" of the post-war 1940s. He was a first-team All-SEC selection in 1948 and 1949. Memorably, Hunsinger rushed for 174 yards and three touchdowns in the 1949 Gators' upset of the Georgia Bulldogs. He was drafted by the Chicago Bears in the first round of the 1950 NFL Draft, and he played six seasons in the NFL and CFL.
Randall B. Jackson	Football	1964–65	Tackle Randy Jackson was a standout lineman on both offense and defense. As a senior in 1965, he was a member of the first Gators team to play in a major New Year's Day bowl game. The Chicago Bears drafted Jackson, and he played for the Bears in 105 games at offensive tackle over eight seasons.
Willie B. Jackson Jr.	Football	1991–93	Wide receiver Willie Jackson Jr. was the son of former Gators wide receiver Willie Jackson Sr. The younger Jackson led the team in receiving twice, was a first-team All-SEC selection, and received All-American honors three times. He finished his college career with 162 receptions for 2,172 yard and twenty-four touchdowns—which remains fifth on the Gators' records list. Jackson played nine seasons in the NFL.
Brandon K. James	Football	2006–09	Running back Brandon James was a two-time All-SEC selection, consensus All-American, and SEC Special Teams Player of the Year in 2008. A member of both the 2006 & 2008 national championship teams, he finished with over 4,770 total yards and still holds the SEC records for both career & combined kickoff yardages.
John W. James Jr.	Football	1970–71	Punter John James was a walk-on player who earned the starting position in 1970 and 1971, and kicked fifty-seven punts for an average distance of 40.3 yards during his senior year in 1971. The Atlanta Falcons signed James in 1972, and he played thirteen seasons in the NFL, and was a three-time Pro Bowl selection.
Alonzo Johnson	Football	1981–85	Linebacker Alonzo Johnson was a two-time first-team All-SEC selection, two-time first-team All-American, and two-time team captain. He was a key member of the Gators defense that produced two first-place SEC finishes in 1984 and 1985. He finished his college career with 335 tackles, fifty-five tackles for a loss, and twenty-seven quarterback sacks. The Philadelphia Eagles picked him in the second round of the 1986 NFL Draft.
Ellis B. Johnson	Football	1991–94	As a senior team captain on the Gators' 1994 SEC championship team, defensive lineman Ellis Johnson was a first-team All-SEC selection, an All-American, CNN's National Defensive Player of the Year, and the team's most valuable player. He finished his Gators career with 16.3 quarterback sacks and 26.8 tackles for a loss. Ellis was a first-round draft pick of the Indianapolis Colts.
Edgar C. Jones	Football; Basketball	1923–25; 1924–25	Halfback Edgar Jones was the senior team captain of the 1925 Gators team that finished 8–2—the best record in the first twenty seasons of the Gators football team. Jones scored sixteen touchdowns and 108 points—still fifth on the Gators' records list. He was also a two-time captain of the basketball team. Jones later returned to the university as an assistant coach and athletic director.
James R. Jones	Football	1979–82	Running back James Jones was a two-time team captain, two-time first-team All-SEC selection, an All-American, and the recipient of the Gators' Fergie Ferguson Award. He finished his college career with 2,026 yards rushing, 593 yards receiving, and forty-eight yards passing. The Detroit Lions picked Jones in the first round of the 1983 NFL Draft, and he played in ten NFL seasons.
James W. Kynes	Football	1946–49	Jimmy Kynes was a two-way offensive and defensive lineman and a senior team captain in 1949. He was one of the great players of the worst time in Gators football history, the ironically named "Golden Era" of the late 1940s. Kynes later served as the attorney general of Florida. His hard-nosed line play is memorialized in the James W. Kynes Award, awarded annually to the best Gator lineman.
William L. Kynes	Football	1975–76	Billy Kynes was a starting quarterback and a Rhodes Scholar.
Charles W. LaPradd	Football	1950–52	Initially an unrecruited walk-on, two-way defensive and offensive tackle Charlie LaPradd was a first-team All-SEC selection and an Associated Press first-team All-American. Described as a man among boys by his teammates, the former paratrooper and team captain developed a ferocious reputation on defense, and was a key man on the Gators defense during the team's 8–3 bowl season in 1952.
R. Burton Lawless	Football	1972–74	Guard Burton Lawless was a three-year starter, a two-time All-SEC selection, and a first-team All-American. The Dallas Cowboys picked Lawless in the second round of the 1975 NFL Draft, and he played in eighty-two NFL games over six seasons, including Super Bowl XII.
Lawrence P. Libertore Jr.	Football	1960–62	Larry Libertore was a small, but quick-on-his-feet option quarterback and defensive back. He was a key member of the Gators offense during the team's 9–2 Gator Bowl season in 1960—the first time the Gators ever won nine games in a season. Libertore's 786 rushing yards remained the most by a Gators quarterback until eclipsed by Tim Tebow in 2007.
David L. Little	Football	1977–80	Linebacker David Little was a first-team All-SEC selection, a consensus first-team All-American, a senior team captain, and the recipient of the Gators' Fergie Ferguson Award. He finished his four-year college career with 475 tackles—still the Gators' all-time career record. Little played in 179 games over twelve seasons for the Pittsburgh Steelers.
Buford E. Long	Football	1950–52	Buford Long was a two-way standout at halfback and defensive back. He was part of the Gators' 1952 backfield that included fullback Rick Casares and halfback Papa Hall and led the team to an 8–3 record and a 14–13 victory in the 1952 Gator Bowl—the Gators' first-ever NCAA-sanctioned bowl game. Long played for the NFL's New York Giants for three seasons.
Wilber B. Marshall	Football	1980–83	Linebacker Wilber Marshall was the core of the Gators' defense from 1980 to 1983. He was a three-time first-team All-SEC selection, a two-time consensus first-team All-American, and ABC Sports' Defensive Player of the Year. The Chicago Bears picked Marshall in the first round of the 1984 NFL Draft, and he played in twelve NFL seasons. He is a member of the College Football Hall of Fame and the Gator Ring of Honor.
Lynn O. Matthews	Football	1963–65	Defensive end Lynn Matthews was a three-year starter, a two-time All-SEC selection, and a first-team All-American. He was a key man in the Gators defense that made possible the team's first-ever Sugar Bowl invitation. Coach Ray Graves rated Matthews as the Gators' best defensive end of the 1960s.
M. Shane Matthews	Football	1989–92	Shane Matthews was a three-year starting quarterback under head coach Steve Spurrier, and led the Gators to their first officially recognized SEC championship in 1991. Matthews led the SEC in passing for three consecutive seasons, and was a three-time first-team All-SEC selection. As a senior team captain, he was also recognized as an All-American. Matthews played in the NFL for fourteen seasons.
Walter "Tiger" Mayberry	Football	1935–37	Halfback Tiger Mayberry was one of the greatest natural athletes to ever play for the Gators, and distinguished himself as a runner, defensive back, passer, "coffin corner" punter, team captain, and rare first-team All-SEC selection. During World War II, he served as a U.S. Marine Corps fighter pilot. Captured by the Japanese after his aircraft crashed in the Pacific Ocean, he died in a prisoner of war camp.
Lee C. McGriff	Football	1972–74	Wide receiver Lee McGriff was a walk-on player who became a first-team All-SEC selection, an All-American, a senior team captain, and the recipient of the Gators' Fergie Ferguson Award. McGriff led the SEC in receiving yardage in 1974 with 698 yards. After college, he played for the NFL's Tampa Bay Buccaneers for a single season.
Perry C. McGriff Jr.	Baseball; Football	1958–60; 1958–59	Perry McGriff was an outstanding two-sport athlete in baseball and football. As a football wide receiver, he led the Gators in pass receptions and yardage and was an All-American selection in 1959. As a baseball player, he was a two-time first-team All-SEC selection and a first-team All-American. McGriff was later elected to the Gainesville city commission, the Alachua County commission, and the Florida House of Representatives.
F. Graham McKeel	Football	1964, 1966–67	Fullback Fred McKeel was a senior team captain in 1967. Memorably, McKeel scored two of the Gators' touchdowns in their 27–12 upset win over Georgia Tech in the 1967 Orange Bowl—the Gators' first-ever major bowl victory.
Victor R. Miranda	Football	1957–58, 1960	As a senior in 1960, guard Vic Miranda was a first-team All-SEC selection, an All-American, and the recipient of the team's Fergie Ferguson Award. A two-way offensive and defensive lineman, Miranda was a key leader of the 1960 Gators squad that finished 9–2 and defeated Baylor 13–12 to win the 1960 Gator Bowl.
Fred Y. Montsdeoca Jr.	Football; Baseball	1948–50; 1948–51	Punter Fred Montsdeoca was one of the standouts of the Gators' ironically named "Golden Era" of the late 1940s. His superior punting was the key to keeping the overmatched Gators competitive in many games. Memorably, in 1949, he punted seven times against Alabama for an average of fifty-three yards per kick. In baseball, Montsdeoca led the Gators with twenty-six runs batted in and a batting average of .422 in 1951.
Nathaniel Moore	Football	1972–73	Running back Nat Moore was a junior transfer. In 1973, he led the Gators with 145 rushes for 845 yards and nine rushing touchdowns, twenty-five receptions for 351 receiving yards and four touchdown catches, and 230 return yards, while earning first-team All-SEC and All-American accolades. In thirteen NFL seasons with the Miami Dolphins, Moore registered 510 catches for 7,547 yards and seventy-four touchdowns.
A. Dennis Murphy	Football	1962–64	Two-way offensive and defensive tackle Dennis Murphy was an All-SEC selection and a first-team All-American in 1964. He played a single season for the NFL's Chicago Bears in 1965.
Richard R. Nattiel	Football	1983–86	Nicknamed the "Rocket" by his Gators teammates, wide receiver Ricky Nattiel was a first-team All-SEC selection, an All-American, a senior team captain, and the recipient of the team's Fergie Ferguson Award. He finished his college career with 117 receptions for 2,086 yards and eighteen touchdowns; he also had 589 yards in punt returns. Nattiel was a first round NFL Draft choice of the Denver Broncos.
Reggie L. Nelson	Football	2005–06	Safety Reggie Nelson was a consensus All-American selection in 2006 with 6 interceptions, helping the Gators to win their first national championship later that year. Nicknamed "The Eraser" for his outstanding defensive play, Nelson went on to play 12 years in the NFL and made 2 Pro Bowls.
Robert D. "Ark" Newton	Football; Basketball	1921–24; 1922–23	An Arkansas native, Newton was nicknamed "Ark" by his teammates. He was the outstanding Gators football player of the early 1920s, and was described as "a superb punter and classic broken field runner, fearless and football-wise." Newton was the senior captain of the 1924 team. Coach James Van Fleet rated him as the best player of his tenure.
Jason B. Odom	Football	1992–95	Offensive lineman Jason Odom was a four-year starter, a first-team All-SEC selection, a unanimous first-team All-American, and a senior team captain. He was also the recipient of the SEC's Jacobs Blocking Trophy. In his four years as a Gator, the team won three consecutive SEC championships, and played for a Bowl Alliance national championship. Odom played four NFL seasons with the Tampa Bay Buccaneers.
Louis Oliver III	Football	1985–88	Free safety Louis Oliver was a walk-on player who earned an athletic scholarship, a starting position, two first-team All-SEC selections, and consensus first-team All-American honors. He was also the recipient of the Gators' Fergie Ferguson Award. In four years as a Gator, he totaled eleven interceptions. A first round NFL Draft choice of the Miami Dolphins, Oliver played eight seasons professionally.
Ralph Ortega	Football	1972–74	Linebacker Ralph Ortega finished his college career with 357 tackles, twelve forced fumbles (eight recovered), and five interceptions. He was a two-time first-team All-SEC selection, a first-team All-American, an Academic All-American, and the senior team captain. The Atlanta Falcons picked Ortega in the second round of the 1975 NFL Draft, and he played six seasons for the Falcons and Miami Dolphins.
Richard A. Pace	Football; Baseball	1947–50; 1948–50	Dick Pace was a three-sport standout in football, basketball and baseball. As a senior baseball player in 1950, he led the team in home runs. Pace later became a long-time SEC basketball and football referee and game official.
Bernard P. Parrish	Football; Baseball	1955–57; 1956–58	Bernie Parrish was a standout two-way halfback and defensive back, and also played baseball. As a junior second baseman, he batted .433 and led the Gators in runs batted in, hits, doubles and home runs, received first-team All-SEC honors, and was the Gators' first-ever first-team baseball All-American. Parrish played eight seasons for the NFL's Cleveland Browns, and was a member of the Browns' 1964 NFL championship team.
Patrick N. Patchen	Football	1958–60	Two-way end Pat Patchen was a first-team All-SEC selection and the recipient of the Gator's Fergie Ferguson award in 1960.
Wayne L. Peace	Football	1980–83	Quarterback Wayne Peace was a four-year starter, an All-SEC selection, and an All-American. During his four-year Gator career, he completed 610 of 991 attempts for 7,286 yards. Memorably, as a freshman he threw for 271 yards and two touchdowns in the Gators' 37–20 victory over the Maryland Terrapins in the 1980 Tangerine Bowl. Peace's 61.6 percent completion average remains the second best in team history.
Michael W. Pearson	Football	1999–2001	Offensive lineman Mike Pearson was a member of the Gators' 2000 SEC championship team, a first-team All-SEC selection twice, and a consensus All-American. The Jacksonville Jaguars chose him in the second round of the 2002 NFL draft, and he played four seasons for the Jaguars and another for the CFL's Toronto Argonauts.
Carl E. "Tootie" Perry	Football	1916, 1919–21	Tootie Perry was a two-way offensive and defensive lineman, among the largest Gators of the day at 5-foot-10 and 235 pounds, and developed a special talent for blocking punts. Perry was an All-Southern selection in 1920 and 1921, and the senior team captain in 1921.
P. Michael Peterson	Football	1995–98	Linebacker Mike Peterson was a first-team All-SEC selection, a first-team All-American, and a senior team captain. He posted 249 tackles, three forced fumbles, thirteen tackles for a loss and 8.5 sacks, and was selected by his teammates as the Gators' most valuable player. The Atlanta Falcons selected Peterson in the second round of the 1999 NFL draft, and he remains an active NFL veteran after thirteen seasons.
L. Maurkice Pouncey	Football	2007–09	National champion, consensus All-American and Rimington Trophy recipient, Maurkice Pouncey was the literal centerpiece for the Gators during his three year in Gainesville. A 39-game starter for Florida, Pouncey went on to start all 134 games in an 11-year career with the Pittsburgh Steelers, making five All-Pro teams and nine Pro Bowls as well as the NFL's 2010s All-Decade Team.
Ashley W. Ramsdell	Football; Basketball; Baseball	1913–15; 1914–16; 1915–16	Quarterback Rammy Ramsdell was a three-year letterman and one of the Gators' great talents of the 'teens. Ramsdell's college football career was prematurely ended when he broke his leg playing baseball at the end of his junior year.
Keiwan J. Ratliff	Football	2000–03	Keiwan Ratliff played cornerback, wide receiver and special teams for the Gators. He was a two-time first-team All-SEC selection, a consensus All-American, and the SEC Defensive Player of the Year. He finished his four-year college career with 860 punt return yards and 12 interceptions. After college, he was drafted by the Cincinnati Bengals in the second round of the NFL Draft and played seven seasons in the NFL.
T. Johnson Reaves	Football	1969–71	Quarterback John Reaves was a three-season starter, a first-team All-SEC selection, and a first-team All-American. He was one of the "Super Sophs," the 1969 Gators' second-year stars who led the team to its all-time best record of 9–1–1 and an upset victory over Tennessee in the Gator Bowl. The Philadelphia Eagles picked Reaves in the first round of the 1972 NFL Draft, and he played fourteen seasons in the NFL and USFL.
Errict U. Rhett	Football	1990–93	Tailback Errict Rhett was a two-time first-team All-SEC selection, a first-team All-American, and a senior team captain. In four college seasons, he totaled 4,163 rushing yards and thirty-four touchdowns, and 1,230 yards receiving and two touchdown receptions; he remains the Gators' all-time leader in career rushing yardage. He was a second round draft pick of the Tampa Bay Buccaneers, and he played in the NFL for seven seasons.
Huey L. Richardson Jr.	Football	1987–90	Defensive end Huey Richardson was a two-time first-team All-SEC selection, a first-team All-American, and a senior team captain. At the conclusion of his four years as a Gator, he totaled 26.5 quarterback sacks and 50.5 tackles for a loss. The Pittsburgh Steelers chose Richardson in the first round of the 1991 NFL Draft.
James W. Rountree	Football	1955–57	Jim Rountree was a two-way halfback and defensive back, a first-team All-SEC selection, and the recipient of the Gators' Fergie Ferguson Award. Coach Bob Woodruff ranked him as one of the Gators' two best defensive backs and one of their two best running backs of the 1950s. Rountree played defensive back and wide receiver for the CFL's Toronto Argonauts from 1958 to 1967, and was a seven-time CFL All-Star.
Lamar Sarra	Football; Basketball; Baseball	1924–26; 1925–27; 1925–27	Lamar Sarra was a versatile three-sport letterman who was the captain of both the Florida Gators baseball and football teams in 1926. He later coached the Plant high school football team.
Thomas J. Shannon Jr.	Football; Baseball	1962–64; 1964–66	Quarterback Tom Shannon was a two-year starter who led the Gators to a 17–7 upset victory over Penn State in the 1962 Gator Bowl. Shannon also played first base for the Gators baseball team and scored twenty-five runs in 1964.
Lito D. Sheppard	Football	1999–2001	Cornerback Lito Sheppard was a two-time All-American & All-SEC selection in his three years with the Gators. He later played 10 years in the NFL, making 2 Pro Bowls and a First-Team All-Pro selection in 2004 for the Eagles.
John M. Simpson	Football	1953–56	Jackie Simpson was a two-way halfback and defensive back, and a three-time All-SEC selection. Head coach Bob Woodruff ranked him as one of the Gators' three best running backs and the best defensive back of the 1950s. His 100-yard interception return in 1955 remains the longest in SEC history. Simpson was drafted by the Baltimore Colts, and he was a member of the Colts' NFL Championship teams in 1958 and 1959.
Emmitt J. Smith III	Football	1987–89	Tailback Emmitt Smith rushed for 3,829 yards and thirty-six touchdowns, and was a three-time first-team All-SEC selection, and unanimous first-team All-American. The Dallas Cowboys chose Smith in the first round of the 1990 NFL Draft, and he became the all-time leading NFL rusher with 18,355 yards and 164 touchdowns. He is a member of the Pro Football Hall of Fame, the College Football Hall of Fame, and the Gator Ring of Honor.
W. Lawrence Smith	Football	1966–68	Tailback Larry Smith was a three-year starter, a three-time first-team All-SEC selection, a first-team All-American, and the recipient of the Gators' Fergie Ferguson Award. He finished his college football career with 528 carries for 2,186 yards and twenty-four touchdowns, and 607 yards receiving. The Los Angeles Rams picked Smith in the first round of the 1969 NFL Draft, and he played in the NFL for six years.
Brandon Spikes	Football	2006–09	Linebacker Brandon Spikes was a three-time first-team All-SEC and was a consensus or unanimous All-American twice. A member of both national championship teams in 2006 & 2008, Spikes finished his Florida career with 307 tackles, 31.5 tackles for loss, 6.5 sacks and 6 interceptions, 4 of which were returned for touchdowns. Spikes went on to have a 6-year career in the NFL.
Stephen O. Spurrier	Football	1964–66	Quarterback Steve Spurrier was a first-team All-SEC selection, a consensus first-team All-American, and the winner of the 1966 Heisman Trophy. Spurrier returned to Florida as head coach in 1990, and led the Gators to their first officially recognized SEC championship in 1991, and their first-ever national championship in 1996. He is a member of the College Football Hall of Fame and the Gator Ring of Honor. In 2016, the university's Board of Regents voted to name the playing surface at Ben Hill Griffin Stadium Steve Spurrier-Florida Field.
Malcolm E. Steen	Football	1967–69	Mac Steen was an offensive lineman who coach Ray Graves rated as the Gators' best right tackle of the 1960s. As the offensive team captain in 1969, Steen led the Gators to an upset 14–13 Gator bowl victory over the Tennessee Volunteers, and a 9–1–1 overall win–loss record—the best in Florida Gators history until that time.
Haywood C. Sullivan	Baseball; Football	1951–52; 1950–51	Haywood Sullivan was a two-sport standout in baseball and football, and is generally rated as the best passing quarterback of the first fifty years of the Gators football program. His equally strong baseball talent led to him receiving a Major League Baseball bonus contract from the Boston Red Sox in 1952, and he rose from team catcher to general manager, and ultimately, to general partner of the Red Sox franchise.
John R. Symank	Football	1955–56	John Symank was a junior transfer to Florida. Coach Bob Woodruff rated him as one of the Gators' five best defensive backs of the 1950s, and among their ten best offensive backs of the decade. The Green Bay Packers picked him in the impossibly low twenty-third round of the 1957 NFL Draft, but Symank rose to become one of the defensive stars of coach Vince Lombardi's 1961 and 1962 NFL Championship teams.
Steven O. Tannen	Football	1967–69	Defensive back Steve Tannen was a first-team All-SEC selection, a first-team All-American, and the recipient of the Gators' Fergie Ferguson Award. Memorably, he blocked a punt that led to the winning score in the Gators' 14–13 upset of the Tennessee Volunteers in the 1969 Gator Bowl. The New York Jets picked Tannen in the first round of the 1970 NFL Draft, and he played for the Jets for five seasons.
Earl A. "Dummy" Taylor	Football	1908–12	Dummy Taylor was one of the greatest athletes of the Florida football team's early years. He was described by contemporaneous newspaper accounts as a legendary broken field runner and a master of the hidden ball trick, and could drop-kick field goals on the run from impossible angles. He was the team captain in 1910 and a prominent member of the Gators' Cigar Bowl team of 1912.
Frederick A. Taylor	Football	1994–97	Running back Fred Taylor earned first-team All-SEC and first-team All-American honors. His coaches picked him as a team captain, and his teammates chose him as their most valuable player in 1997. During his college career, he rushed for 3,075 yards and thirty-one touchdowns. The Jacksonville Jaguars picked Taylor in the first round of the 1998 NFL draft, and he totaled 11,695 rushing yards during his thirteen-season NFL career.
Timothy R. Tebow	Football	2006–09	Arguably one of the greatest college football players of all time, Tim Tebow quarterbacked the Gators to two national championships, making 3 All-SEC teams and winning 2 Maxwell Awards. The all-time leader in career offense and rushing touchdowns for the Gators, he won the 2007 Heisman Trophy off of 55 total touchdowns, including an NCAA record 23 rushing touchdowns, the most by a quarterback up to that point. When he left Florida, he held 5 NCAA, 14 SEC, and 28 UF statistical records. He is a member of the College Football Hall of Fame and the Gator Ring of Honor.
Allen R. Trammell Jr.	Football; Baseball	1963–65; 1964–65	Two-way defensive back and wide receiver Allen Trammell was a walk-on player who earned an All-SEC selection. He was the Gators' leading punt returner in 1964, and Coach Ray Graves rated him as one of the Gators' two best cornerbacks of the 1960s. Trammell was signed by the Houston Oilers in 1966.
Richard E. Trapp	Football; Baseball	1965–67; 1967–68	In his three-season college career, wide receiver Richard Trapp led the Gators in receiving yardage in 1966 and 1967, and compiled 1,783 receiving yards. He had eight games with 100 yards or more receiving, including 171 yards against the Georgia Bulldogs in 1967. He twice received first-team All-SEC honors, and was the recipient of the Gators' Fergie Ferguson Award as a senior.
Dale H. Van Sickel	Football; Basketball; Football	1927–29 1929	Dale Van Sickel was the first University of Florida athlete, in any sport, to receive first-team All-American honors. He was recognized as a first-team All-American as a two-way defensive end and receiver on the great Gators football team of 1928, and received honorable mention All-American honors again in 1929. After graduation, Van Sickel became a Hollywood stuntman and actor.
Ion "Speedy" Walker	Football; Basketball	1926–27; 1927–28	Speedy Walker was the smallest member of the Gators' 1926 and 1927 backfields at 133 pounds, but he could run, pass and kick with equal dexterity. Walker was a key contributor to the Gators' 7–3 season in 1927. He was also the senior captain of the basketball team during the 1927–28 season.
J. Frederick Weary	Football	1994–97	Cornerback Fred Weary was a two-time first-team All-SEC selection and consensus All-American in 1997, as well as a key member of the 1996 national championship team, Florida's first. His 15 career interceptions are the most in Florida history. He later went on to a 7-year career in the NFL.
David W. Williams	Football	1985–88	Offensive lineman David Williams started in every game during his four-season college career, including the Gators' first-place SEC season in 1985. He was a two-time first-team ALL-SEC selection, an All-American, and a senior team captain. Williams was a first-round draft pick of the Houston Oilers and started in 106 games during his nine-season NFL career.
Jarvis E. Williams	Football	1984–87	Strong safety Jarvis Williams started forty-five consecutive games (the second highest total in Gators history), and was a key member of the Gators defense that contributed to the Gators' first-place SEC finishes in 1984 and 1985. In four years as a Gator, he had ten career interceptions, and led the team in tackles and punt returns as a senior. The Miami Dolphins picked Williams in the second round of the 1988 NFL Draft.
John L. Williams	Football	1982–85	Running back John L. Williams shared the Gators backfield with Neal Anderson, and the two formed a devastating running attack. In four years as a Gator, he compiled 2,409 yards rushing and 863 yards receiving, and received All-SEC and All-American honors. A first-round draft pick of the Seattle Seahawks, Williams was a two-time Pro Bowl selection and played in Super Bowl XXX.
Lawrence D. Wright III	Football	1993–96	Safety Lawrence Wright was a member of four consecutive SEC championships teams, and a key defensive player on the Gators' first-ever national championship team in 1996. Wright was a senior team captain, a two-time first-team All-SEC selection, an All-American, a CFA Scholar-Athlete, and the winner of Jim Thorpe Award recognizing him as the best defensive back in college football.
Daniel C. Wuerffel	Football	1993–96	Quarterback Danny Wuerffel was a member of four consecutive SEC championship teams, and led the Gators to their first-ever national championship in 1996. He was a first-team All-SEC selection, a consensus first-team All-American, the recipient of the Draddy Trophy, and the Heisman Trophy winner. In four seasons, Wuerffel completed 708 of 1,170 passes for 10,875 yards and 114 touchdown passes—the best in SEC history.
James K. Yarbrough	Football	1966–68	Six-foot-six, 260-pound Jim Yarbrough was a standout tight end and backup kicker for the Gators. He was drafted by the Detroit Lions in the second round of the 1969 NFL Draft, and played eight seasons for Lions.
H. Jackson Youngblood	Football	1968–70	Defensive lineman Jack Youngblood was a first-team All-SEC selection, a first-team All-American, and the recipient of the Gators' Fergie Ferguson Award. The St. Louis Rams drafted him in the first round of the 1971 NFL Draft, and he received numerous All-Pro and Pro Bowl honors during his fourteen-year NFL career. Youngblood is a member of the Pro Football Hall of Fame, College Football Hall of Fame, and Gator Ring of Honor.
Jeffrey A. Zimmerman	Football	1983–86	Nicknamed the "One Man Gang", offensive lineman Jeff Zimmerman was a three-time All-SEC selection and back-to-back first-team All-American nods in 1985 & 1986 as a member of the "Great Wall of Florida", which helped the Gators achieve their best records in program history from 1984 to 1986, to that point. He later went on to play for 4 years in the NFL with the Dallas Cowboys.

== Men's golf ==
The following Gator Greats are former members of the Florida Gators men's golf team:

Name	Sport	Years	Accomplishments
Thomas D. Aaron	Golf	1956–59	Tommy Aaron was a member of the Gators' 1956 SEC championship team, and won the individual SEC championship in 1957 and 1958. He was a two-time All-American. He placed second in the U.S. Amateur in 1958, was a member of the 1959 U.S. Walker Cup team, and won the Western Amateur in 1960. As a professional, Aaron won three PGA Tour events, and placed second in the 1972 PGA Championship.
T. Andrew Bean	Golf	1972–75	Andy Bean was a member of the 1973 Gators team that won the SEC and NCAA national championship tournaments. He was a two-time first-team All-SEC selection, and a three-time All-American. As a professionalfessional golfer, Bean won eleven PGA Tour events; he placed second in the 1980 and 1989 PGA Championships, and also in the 1982 British Open.
Frank J. Beard	Golf	1958–61	Frank Beard was recognized as an All-American in 1960 and 1961. As a professionalfessional golfer, Beard won eleven PGA Tour events, and placed third in the U.S. Open in 1965 and 1975.
Camilo Benedetti	Golf	1999–2002	A three-time All-American and All-SEC, Camilo Benedetti finished his college career a national champion in 2001 as well as national runner-up that year with a score of 279 at the NCAA Championships that year. He later turned professional, playing in 2 PGA Tour events.
Christian D. DiMarco	Golf	1987–90	As a Gator, Chris DiMarco shot a three-round score of 209 to win the SEC individual title in 1989, while leading the Gators to an SEC team championship. He was a seven-time collegiate medalist, a two-time first-team All-SEC selection, the SEC Player of the Year, and a three-time All-American. As a professional, DiMarco has won three PGA Tour events; he has also placed second in the PGA Championship, The Masters, and the British Open.
Matthew K. Every	Golf	2003–06	A three-team first-team All-American, Matt Every became the first Gator to win the Ben Hogan Award in 2006 as the most outstanding collegiate golfer. This came after an appearance at the 2005 U.S. Open as an amateur, where he finished in 28th place, his best major finish. As a professional, Every won back-to-back Arnold Palmer Invitationals in 2014 & 2015 and the 2009 Nationwide Tour Championship.
J. Brian Gay	Golf	1991–94	During his four years as a Gator, the team won four consecutive SEC championships, and the 1993 NCAA national championship. Individually, he was the SEC Freshman of the Year, a five-time individual medalist, two-time SEC individual champion, three-time first-team All-SEC selection, and a two-time All-American. As a professionalfessional golfer, Gay has won three PGA Tour events.
Phillip R. Hancock	Golf	1973–76	During Phil Hancock's freshman year, the Gators golf team won the 1973 NCAA Championship. Individually, Hancock received All-SEC honors for four consecutive years, and was a three-time All-American. He won the SEC individual championship in 1975 and 1976. As a professional, he won three tournaments.
H. Dudley Hart	Golf	1987–90	As a four-year Gator golfer, Dudley Hart was the SEC Freshman of the Year, a three-time first-team All-SEC selection, and a four-time All-American. As a professionalfessional golfer, Hart has won two PGA Tour events, and placed sixth in the 1993 PGA Championship.
William J. Horschel	Golf	2006–09	Billy Horschel was a four-time All-American and 2-time SEC Player of the Year at the University of Florida, as well as the 2006 U.S. Amateur champion. As a professional, Horschel has 10 wins, 8 of which have come on the PGA Tour. The 2014 FedEx Cup champion, Horschel has finished in the top 25 in all 4 majors, including a fourth-place finish at the 2013 U.S. Open, eighth-place at the 2024 PGA Championship and second place at the 2024 Open Championship.
Gary D. Koch	Golf	1971–74	Gary Koch was a four-time first-team All-SEC selection, and a three-time All-American. He was also a member of the Gators teams that won two SEC championships, and the 1973 NCAA national championship. Individually, he was a two-time individual SEC tournament champion, and the runner-up at the 1973 NCAA tournament. As a professional, Koch won four PGA Tour events; his best finish in a major was fourth at the 1988 British Open.
Steven N. Melnyk	Golf	1967–69	Steve Melnyk was a two-time All-American, and the number one golfer on the 1968 team that won the NCAA Division I Golf Championship—the first national championship, in any sport, in University of Florida history. Melnyk won both the U.S. Amateur and the British Amateur; as a pro, he won four PGA Tour events.
Robert J. Murphy	Golf	1964–66	Bob Murphy won the 1965 U.S. Amateur Championship and the 1966 individual NCAA championship, and was recognized as an All-American in 1966. As a professionalfessional golfer, he won five PGA Tour events; he also placed second at the 1970 PGA Championship, and third at the 1975 U.S. Open.
Andrew S. North	Golf	1969–72	As a Gator golfer, Andy North was a three-time first-team All-SEC selection, and an All-American in 1970, 1971 and 1972. As a member of the PGA Tour, North won the U.S. Open in 1978 and 1985.
David W. Ragan Jr.	Golf	1954–56	Dave Ragan was a member of the Gators team that finished sixth in the NCAA national tournament in 1955, and won the first two SEC championships in team history in 1955 and 1956. As a senior in 1956, he won the SEC individual championship, and was recognized as an All-American. As a professionalfessional golfer, Ragan won three PGA Tour events, and placed third at the 1963 PGA Championship.
G. Douglas Sanders	Golf	1955	In 1955, Doug Sanders and the team won the SEC championship and earned a sixth-place finish at the NCAA championship tournament—the Gators' best national championship finish until that time. He won the 1956 Canadian Open—the first amateur to do so. As a member of the PGA Tour, Sanders won twenty events; he placed second in the PGA Championship, the U.S. Open, and the British Open (twice).
Daniel D. Sikes	Golf	1951–53	Dan Sikes was recognized as an All-American in 1952—the University of Florida's first All-American golfer. As a member of the PGA Tour, he won six events; he also placed fifth at the 1965 Masters, and third at the 1967 PGA Championship.
Camilo Villegas Restrepo	Golf	2001–04	A four-time first-team All-American and All-SEC selection as well as a two-time SEC Player of the Year, Camilo Villegas was a member of the 2001 NCAA championship team as a freshman. As a professional, he has 12 wins, 5 of which came on the PGA Tour. He has finished in the top 15 in all 4 majors, including fourth at the PGA Championship and ninth at the U.S. Open in 2008, and thirteenth at both the Masters & Open Championships in 2009.

== Women's golf ==
The following Gator Greats are former members of the Florida Gators women's golf team:

Name	Sport	Years	Accomplishments
Karen Davies	Golf	1985–88	Karen Davies won the individual SEC championship in 1986, led the Lady Gators to back-to-back NCAA national championships in 1985 and 1986, and set the present team record for most collegiate individual tournament victories (9). She was the SEC Freshman of the Year, the SEC Player of the Year, a four-time first-team All-SEC selection, and a three-time first-team All-American. Davies played on the LPGA Tour for fourteen years.
E. Page Dunlap-Halpin	Golf	1984–87	Page Dunlap was a member of the Lady Gators' back-to-back NCAA national championship teams in 1985 and 1986. Dunlap was also the individual NCAA national champion in 1986, shooting a 72-hole score of 291 to win by a single stroke. She was a first-team All-American, and won the Broderick Award in 1986. Dunlap is a member of the National Golf Coaches Association (NGCA) Players Hall of Fame.
Riko Higashio	Golf	1995–98	Riko Higashio was the SEC Freshman of the Year in 1996, a three-time first-team All-SEC selection, and a first-team All-American and the recipient of the Dinah Shore Trophy in 1998. She tied for the lowest 18-hole round in Lady Gators history (67). Higashio turned professional in 1998, and played on the Futures Tour, LPGA Tour and LPGA Tour of Japan.
Donna Horton White	Golf	1975–76	In her two years as a Lady Gator, Donna Horton was a four-time collegiate medalist. In 1976, she competed in the World Cup and the Curtis Cup, and won the U.S. Amateur. She turned professional in 1977, and competed on the LPGA Tour for fifteen years, and won three LPGA tournaments. Horton is a member of the NGCA Players Hall of Fame.
Cheryl Morley Pontious	Golf	1985–88	Cheryl Morley was a member of the Lady Gators' NCAA national championship team in 1986, and won the individual SEC championship in 1988. She was a three-time first-team All-SEC selection, and a two-time first-team All-American. Morley is a member of the NGCA Players Hall of Fame.
Deb Richard	Golf	1982–85	Deb Richard won seven collegiate tournaments, including three consecutive SEC individual championships. She was a four-time first-team All-SEC selection, and a two-time first-team All-American. She was the individual runner-up, by a single stroke, at the NCAA Women's Golf Championship, the SEC Golfer of the Year, and winner of the Broderick Award in 1985. Richard is a member of the NGCA Players Hall of Fame.

== Women's gymnastics ==
The following Gator Greats are former members of the Florida Gators women's gymnastics team:

Name	Sport	Years	Accomplishments
Kristin Guise Lee	Gymnastics	1993–96	Kristin Guise received a total of eleven All-American honors, including six first-team honors. Guise finished first in the SEC Championship all-around competition in 1995, and was recognized as the SEC Gymnast of the Year in 1996.
Corey Hartung	Gymnastics	2006–09	Corey Hartung received ten All-American honors. She won 58 titles, including 14 in all-around competition. She finished first in the SEC championship balance beam competition in 2008.
Kytra T. Hunter	Gymnastics	2012–15	Kytra Hunter earned 25 All-American honors and was the first Gator to win an NCAA all-around title, which she did twice. She was also a member of the Gators teams that won three consecutive NCAA championships in 2013, 2014, and 2015. She ranks third all-time in school history for career all-around wins (21) and event titles lists (83).
Lynn McDonnell Keefe	Gymnastics	1981–84	Lynn McDonnell received four All-American honors. McDonnell was a member of the Gators teams that won the AIAW national championship team in 1982, and three consecutive SEC championships in 1982, 1983 and 1984. She finished first in the SEC championship all-around competition in 1981 and 1982.
Melissa Miller	Gymnastics	1986–89	Melissa Miller earned six All-American honors. Miller finished first in the SEC championship all-around competition in 1988 and 1989.
Elfi Schlegel-Dunn	Gymnastics	1983–86	Elfi Schlegel received six All-American honors. She was a member of the Gators' SEC championship teams in 1983 and 1984. Schlegel turned in top-three performances in ten individual events at four SEC championship tournaments.
Bridget E. Sloan	Gymnastics	2013–16	When the sport of gymnastics is mentioned, it usually includes Bridget Sloan. 31 All-American honors, 27 all-around victories, 95 event titles, 8 times she earned a 10.0 mark: all the most in Florida history. Helping the Gators win three straight national championships from 2013–2015, she also won six individual titles and became the first Gator gymnast to achieve the "Gym Slam" - a 10.0 mark on all four apparatuses. She also won the Honda Award twice and was named the SEC Female Athlete of the Year in 2016. A silver medalist at the 2008 Olympics, she remains the only gymnast to win all-around titles at the World Championships, U.S. Championships, and NCAA Championships.
Chrissy Van Fleet	Gymnastics	1997–2000	Chrissy Van Fleet earned five first-team All-American honors, and six more second-team honors. Van Fleet led the Gators to a second-place NCAA finish as a sophomore in 1998, earned sixteen all-around victories during her career, and was the SEC Gymnast of the Year in 2000.
Ann M. Woods-Smith	Gymnastics	1980–82	Ann Woods earned five All-American honors. Woods was a key member of the Gators' SEC championship and AIAW national championship team in 1982. Woods placed among the top three in five different individual events at the 1982 SEC championships, and was recognized as the outstanding collegiate gymnast of 1981–82.

== Women's lacrosse ==
The following Gator Greats are former members of the Florida Gators women's lacrosse team:

Name	Sport	Years	Accomplishments
Kitty Cullen	Lacrosse	2010–13	As a member of the first four Gator lacrosse teams in school history, Kitty Cullen made 79 appearances with 73 starts and was a three-time IWLCA All-American. Her 261 career points (203 goals, 58 assists) ranks 5th all time in goals and 7th in points. She helped lead Florida to its first NCAA semifinal in 2012 off of 8 hat-trick games and 3 5+ goal games that season.
Mikey Meagher	Lacrosse	2010–13	Another member of the first four Gator lacrosse teams in school history, Mikey Meagher made history in 2013 as the first goalkeeper named among the finalists for the Tewaaraton Award. A two-time winner of the Ensign C. Markland Kelly, Jr. Award for best goalkeeper, her 7.58 career GAA at Florida still remains the best in program history.

== Women's soccer ==
The following Gator Greats are former members of the Florida Gators women's soccer team:

Name	Sport	Years	Accomplishments
Erin Baxter McCorkle	Soccer	1995–98	Midfielder Erin Baxter was a senior member of the Gators' 1998 NCAA national championship team. Baxter was a three-time first-team All-SEC selection and a three-time All-American. She was named the Soccer America Most Valuable Player of the 1998 season.
Danielle Garrett Fotopoulos	Soccer	1996–98	Forward Danielle Fotopoulos was a senior member of the Gators' 1998 NCAA national championship team. She was a two-time first-team All-SEC selection and a two-time All-American, and was named National Player of the Year by several organizations in 1998. Fotopoulos was a member of the U.S. national team that won the 1999 FIFA Women's World Cup.
Stephanie Freeman Echarte	Soccer	2001–04	Midfielder Stephanie Freeman was a two-time SEC Player of the Year and three-time All-SEC selection. An All-American in 2003, she won MVP of the SEC Tournament in 2004 in a year where she led the Gators with 17 goals & 37 points.
Heather Mitts Feeley	Soccer	1996–99	Defender Heather Mitts was a key member of the Gators' first NCAA national championship team in 1998, and was recognized as a first-team All-American in 1999. Mitts won Olympic gold medals as a member of the winning U.S. teams in 2004, 2008 and 2012, and was a member of the U.S. national team for the 2011 FIFA Women's World Cup tournament.
Erika L. Tymrak	Soccer	2009–12	Midfielder Erika Tymrak was a two-time All-American and three-time first-team All-SEC selection. The 2012 SEC Offensive Player of the Year, her 32 goals and third-best 40 assists helped the Gators to win 3 SEC championships during her college career. She most recently played for the NWSL's Orlando Pride and has signed to join the Tampa Bay Sun of the USL Super League.
M. Abigail Wambach	Soccer	1998–2001	Forward Abby Wambach was a member of the Gators' 1998 NCAA national championship team. She was a four-time first-team All-SEC selection, a two-time first-team All-American, and the Soccer America Most Valuable Player in 2001. Wambach won Olympic gold medals as a member of the winning U.S. teams in 2004 and 2012, and was a member of the U.S. national team for the 2003, 2007, 2011 and 2015 FIFA Women's World Cup tournaments.
Sarah Yohe Cohen	Soccer	1996–99	Sarah Yohe scored eighteen game-winning goals as a Gator. As a freshman, she kicked the winning goal in the Gators' first SEC championship. As a junior, she scored the team's only goal in the 1–0 victory over Santa Clara in the NCAA semifinals, sending the Gators to the 1998 NCAA championship. As a senior, she was SEC Player of the Year, a first-team All-SEC selection, a second-team All-American, and the national Scholar Athlete of the Year.

== Softball ==
The following Gator Great is a former member of the Florida Gators softball team:

Name	Sport	Years	Accomplishments
Kelsey Bruder	Softball	2008–11	Kelsey Bruder was the first Gator softball player to win the NCAA's Top VIII Award and Honda Award, both in 2011. That same year, she won SEC Player of the Year and helped the Gators reach the Women's College World Series, making the all-tournament team. A two-time All-American, she played 3 years in the NPF before becoming an assistant coach for both Murray State and Florida's softball teams.
Francesca Enea	Softball	2007–10	Francesca Enea became the second Gator to make 3 All-America teams, helping lead Florida to its first WCWS appearances in 2008 & 2009. She finished her Florida career with the most home runs (61), RBIs (221), and total bases (431). After leaving UF, she played 4 years in the NPF before becoming an analyst for 12 years & returning to UF as an assistant coach in 2023.
Jennifer M. Gladding	Softball	2003–04	Pitcher Jenny Gladding was a junior transfer to the University of Florida. In two seasons as one of the Gators' starting pitchers, she compiled 285 strikeouts, an earned run average of 1.20, one perfect game and one no-hitter. She was a first-team All-SEC selection in 2003.
Lauren E.A. Haeger	Softball	2012–15	Nicknamed "Haeger Bomb", Lauren Haeger was responsible for leading Florida to back-to-back national championships in 2014 & 2015 on top of winning the Honda Award, USA Softball Collegiate Player of the Year and WCWS MOP, as well as SEC Female Athlete of the Year. A two-time first-team All-American and 2015 SEC Pitcher of the Year, she joins Babe Ruth as the only players in baseball or softball history with 70 career wins and 70 home runs. She ranks top-10 in mostly all Florida categories, including a school-record 71 career home runs & 260 RBIs.
Michelle Moultrie	Softball	2009–12	Michelle Moultrie walked onto the Florida softball team in 2009. In a 4-year career, she made 2 All-America teams, was the 2012 SEC Player of the Year, and was a co-recipient of the Most Outstanding Player at the Women's College World Series in 2011, finishing with career records in batting average (.395) and stolen bases (83). Since leaving UF, she has been a member of the US women's national team, helping the U.S. win a silver medal at the 2020 Summer Olympics.
Stacey L. Nelson	Softball	2006–09	Pitcher Stacey Nelson became Florida's first three-team first-team NFCA All-American. A two-time SEC Pitcher of the Year, she helped Florida make its first two WCWS appearances in 2008 and 2009. When she left, she held 15 single-season records and 15 career records, including wins (136), ERA (0.99), shutouts (60), and innings pitched (1141.2), as well as the second-most strikeouts in Florida history (1,116).
Hannah Rogers	Softball	2011–14	Pitcher Hannah Rogers became Florida's first four-team NFCA All-American. On top of that, she was named the 2014 Women's College World Series Most Outstanding Player as Florida won its first national championship, leading to an addition SEC Female Athlete of the Year award. When she left, she was second in most pitching categories.
C. Chelsey Sakizzie	Softball	1997–98	Chelsey Sakizzie transferred to the University of Florida as a junior. In just two seasons as the Gators' ace starting pitcher, she won sixty games, notched 557 strikeouts, and compiled an earned run average of only 1.14. In ninety-five appearances, she pitched seventy-one complete games, and threw twenty-seven shutouts. She was a two-time first-team All-SEC selection, the SEC Player of the Year, and an All-American.
Kelsey Stewart	Softball	2013–16	Statistically the greatest hitter in Gators softball history, Kelsey Stewart holds the career hits record with 357, alongside 29 triples, 259 runs scored & 509 total bases. A two-time NFCA All-American and three-time All-SEC player, Stewart won the SEC Player of the Year award in 2015 and helped Florida win back-to-back national championships in 2014 & 2015.

== Men's swimming and diving ==
The following Gator Greats are former male members of the Florida Gators swimming and diving teams:

Name	Sport	Years	Accomplishments
St. Elmo "Chic" Acosta	Swimming	1939–40	Chic Acosta won the 1939 individual SEC championship in the 50-yard freestyle event.
Craig R. Beardsley	Swimming	1979–83	Craig Beardsley was a butterfly specialist who was a member of the 1980 U.S. Olympic team and the favorite to win a gold medal, but was unable to compete because of the American-led boycott of the Moscow Olympics. He was an eight-time All-American, and won two individual NCAA championships in the 200-meter butterfly. While he was a Gator, Beardsley held the world record in the 200-meter butterfly from 1980 to 1983.
James L. Borland	Diving	1953–54	Diver Jim Borland was an All-American who won two individual SEC championships in the one-meter and three-meter springboard diving events, making a major contribution to the Gators' SEC team championship in 1954.
Gregory S. Burgess	Swimming	1991–94	Greg Burgess earned twelve All-American honors, and won eight SEC championships & four individual NCAA titles in both the 200 and 400-meter individual medleys, while also setting four records in both events. While a student-athlete at UF, Burgess won a silver medal at the 1992 Olympics in the 200 meter IM. Following his graduation, he finished 8th at the 1996 Olympics & joined the Marine Corps in 1997, where he currently serves as a major after two tours in Iraq.
Matthew J. Cetlinski	Swimming	1983–86	Matt Cetlinski earned eight All-American honors, and won five individual NCAA titles in distance swimming events, including the 500-meter freestyle (twice) and the 1,650-meter freestyle (three times). Cetlinski won a gold medal as a member of the winning U.S. team in the 4×200-meter freestyle relay at the 1988 Olympics.
Marcin Cieślak	Swimming	2011–14	Marcin Cieślak was a 25-time All-American and 23-time All-SEC selection. He won 9 SEC championships in the 200 & 400 medley relays, 100 & 200 flies, 200 IM, and 200 freestyle. He also won NCAA titles in 2014 in the 200-meter individual medley and 100-meter fly. He remains the leader in 10 different events in program history and competed for Poland in two events at the 2012 Olympics.
Edmond "Tom" Dioguardi	Swimming	1966–67	Tom Dioguardi was a freestyle specialist who received five All-American honors, and was an eight-time SEC individual champion—three times in the 50-yard freestyle, twice in the 100-yard freestyle, and three times in the 200-yard freestyle. Dioguardi was a major contributor to the Gators' SEC team championships in 1966 and 1967.
Phillip A. Drake	Swimming	1956–58	Phil Drake was a two-time All-American who won four individual SEC championships in 1957 and 1958, including the 100-yard butterfly, 200-yard butterfly (twice), and 200-yard individual medley. Drake was a major contributor to the Gators' SEC team championships in 1957 and 1958.
Conor J. Dwyer	Swimming	2009–11	Conor Dwyer received twelve All-American honors and was a three-time national champion & eight-time SEC champion. A two-time SEC & NCAA Male Swimmer of the Year, Dwyer still holds six program records. Dwyer won gold medals at both the 2012 & 2016 Olympics as a member of the U.S. team in the 4×200-meter relay, as well as a bronze medal at the 2016 Olympics in the 200-meter freestyle.
Shaune D. Fraser	Swimming	2006–10	Shaune Fraser received a school record twenty-seven All-American honors and was a three-time individual NCAA champion in the 200-yard butterfly (twice) and the 200-yard freestyle, where he broke the collegiate record in the 200-yard butterfly at the 2009 NCAA Championships. A resident of the Cayman Islands, Fraser represented them at 3 Olympic Games, where he was the flag bearer at the 2008 Games.
Geoffrey S. Gaberino	Swimming	1981–84	Geoff Gaberino received fourteen All-American honors and was the team captain when the Gators won back-to-back NCAA national team championships in 1983 and 1984. He swam the opening leg for the Gators' NCAA championship relay teams in the 4×100-meter and 4×200-meter freestyle relay events. Gaberino won a gold medal at the 1984 Olympics as a member of the winning U.S. team in the 4×200-meter relay.
Michael S. Heath	Swimming	1983–86	Mike Heath earned nineteen All-American honors. He swam the anchor leg for the Gators' NCAA national championship relay teams in the 4×100-meter and 4×200-meter freestyle relay events in 1983 and 1984, and also won an individual NCAA title in the 200-meter freestyle. Heath won three gold medals (4×100-meter freestyle, 4×200-meter freestyle, and 4×100-meter medley relays) and a silver (200-meter freestyle) at the 1984 Olympics.
Rogers B. "Tiger" Holmes	Swimming	1941–42, 1947	Tiger Holmes was the SEC champion in the 50-yard freestyle and a member of the Gators' SEC champion medley relay team in 1942. His college career was interrupted by his military service during World War II, but he returned to lead the team as captain after the war. A long-time financial supporter of Gators athletics, Holmes served as president of Gator Boosters, Inc.
Patrick D. Kennedy	Swimming	1983–84; 1986	Pat Kennedy was a nine-time All-American. He was a major contributor to the Gators' 1983 and 1984 NCAA national team championships, placing third in two events in 1983 (200-meter backstroke, 400-meter individual medley), and second in two events in 1984 (200-meter and 400-meter individual medley). Kennedy was a member of the 1984 U.S. Olympic team and placed eighth in the 200-meter butterfly.
David E. Larson	Swimming	1978–81	David Larson received twenty-one All-American honors, and was a member of the Gators' NCAA national championship relay teams in the 4×200-meter freestyle relay in 1979 and 1981. Larson won a gold medal at the 1984 Olympics as a member of the winning U.S. team in the 4×200-meter relay.
Gerald S. Livingston	Swimming	1962–64	Jerry Livingston was a four-time All-American who dominated the butterfly in the SEC, winning three consecutive individual SEC titles in both the 100-yard and 200-yard butterfly events. He was a major contributor to the Gators' SEC team championships in 1962, 1963 and 1964.
Ryan S. Lochte	Swimming	2002–06	Ryan Lochte was a 24-time All-American who won seven NCAA titles & eight SEC titles as well as two NCAA Swimmer of the Year awards. He has won 90 medals in international competition, including 12 Olympic medals, the second-most by an American swimmer. In addition, he still holds 4 world records in Olympic competition.
J. Stephen McBride	Diving	1960–62	Diver Steve McBride was a two-time All-American who dominated diving in the SEC for three years, winning individual SEC championships in the one-meter and three-meter springboard diving events in 1960, 1961 and 1962. McBride was a major contributor to the Gators' SEC team championships in those same years.
Mark A. McKee	Swimming	1968–71	Mark McKee was a medley swimmer who received four All-American honors. He who won four individual SEC championships, including the 200-meter individual medley once, and the 400-meter individual medley three times. He was a major contributor to the Gators' SEC team championships in 1968 and 1970.
A. Timothy McKee	Swimming	1972–74	Tim McKee was a four-time All-American. He won six individual SEC championships, including the 200-meter backstroke (twice), 200-meter individual medley (twice), and 400-meter individual medley (twice). McKee competed at the 1972 and 1976 Olympics, and won three silver medals—one in the 200-meter individual medley, and two in the 400-meter individual medley.
Andrew M. McPherson	Swimming	1967–69	Andy McPherson was a three-time All-American who won five individual SEC titles in three years, including the 100-yard freestyle (three times), the 50-yard freestyle, and the 200-yard individual medley. McPherson was a major contributor to the Gators' SEC team championships in 1967 and 1968.
Alberto E. Mestre-Sosa	Swimming	1983–86	Alberto Mestre earned seventeen All-American honors. He was a member of the Gators' NCAA national championship relay teams in the 4×100-meter and 4×200-meter freestyle relay events in 1983 and 1984, and also placed second in the 100-meter freestyle in 1984. Mestre was a member of the Venezuelan Olympic team in 1980 and 1984, and placed sixth in the 100-meter freestyle and fifth in the 200-meter freestyle in 1984.
Anthony C. Nesty	Swimming	1989–92	Anthony Nesty received sixteen All-American honors. He won three consecutive individual NCAA championships in the 100-yard butterfly (1990–1992), one in the 200-yard butterfly (1990), and one as a member of the school's 400-yard medley relay team (1991). Nesty won a gold medal in the 100-meter butterfly at the 1988 Olympics, and a bronze medal in the same event at the 1992 Olympics.
James Ray Perkins	Swimming	1968–71	Four-time All-American Jimmy Perkins was a breaststroke specialist who won an individual SEC title in the 200-yard breaststroke event in 1970, contributing to the Gators' 1970 SEC team championship.
Edwin C. Reese	Swimming	1961–63	Eddie Reese won seven individual SEC titles, including the 200-yard butterfly, 200-yard breaststroke (twice), 200-yard individual medley (three times), and 400-yard individual medley. He was a major contributor as the Gators swept three straight SEC team championships. Reese is the current head coach of the University of Texas swim team, and his Longhorn swimmers have won ten NCAA national team championships.
Charles T. "Ted" Robinson	Swimming	1953–54	All-American Ted Robinson won three individual SEC titles in breaststroke events, including the 100-yard breaststroke in 1953, and the 200-yard breaststroke in 1953 and 1954. Robinson was a major contributor to the Gators' back-to-back SEC team championships in 1953 and 1954.
Barry R. Russo	Swimming	1966–68	Barry Russo was a two-time All-American in the breaststroke who won two individual SEC titles in the 200-yard breaststroke and a third SEC team title as a member of the Gators' 4×200-yard freestyle relay team. Russo was a key contributor to the Gators' back-to-back SEC team championships in 1966, 1967 and 1968.
Christopher Snode	Diving	1977–80	Chris Snode was the University of Florida's first individual Gator NCAA champion, winning the NCAA national championship in the three-meter springboard event in 1978. He received six All-American honors Snode was Great Britain's first world diving champion (1979) and a member of the British Olympic team in 1976, 1980 and 1984; he placed among the top ten divers in the world in both platform and springboard diving at the 1980 and 1984 Olympics, and won the first FINA World Cup in the three-meter in 1979.
Blanchard E. Tual	Swimming	1965–67	Blanchard Tual dominated the backstroke events at the SEC championships for three consecutive years, sweeping the 100-meter and 200-meter backstroke in 1965, 1966 and 1967, and making major contributions to the Gators' three straight SEC team championships during those same years.
E. Craig White	Diving; Swimming	1954–56	Craig White was a rare All-American athlete who won individual SEC championships in both swimming and diving events. White swept the one-meter and three-meter springboard diving events, while also swimming a leg for the Gators' winning team in the 400-yard freestyle relay, and making a major contribution to the Gators' 1954 SEC team championship.
Bruce L. Williams	Swimming	1968–71	Bruce Williams was a five-time All-American who won a total of five individual SEC championships in 1968 and 1969, including the 100-yard butterfly, 200-yard freestyle (twice), 500-yard freestyle, and 1,650-yard freestyle. Williams was a major contributor to the Gators' SEC team championship in 1968.
David Lopez-Zubero	Swimming	1978–81	David Zubero was a member of the Gators' relay teams that won the NCAA national championship in the 4×200-yard freestyle relay while setting a new American record in 1979, and again when the Gators won the NCAA championship in same event in 1981. He received fourteen All-American honors. Zubero won a bronze medal in the 200-meter butterfly at the 1980 Olympics.
Martin López-Zubero	Swimming	1988–91	While swimming for the Gators, Martin Zubero won four individual NCAA national championships—the 200-meter individual medley, the 400-meter medley relay, and twice in the 200-meter backstroke—received fifteen All-American honors, and was recognized as the 1991 NCAA Male Swimmer of the Year. Zubero won the gold medal in the 200-meter backstroke at the 1992 Olympics.

== Women's swimming and diving ==
The following Gator Greats are former female members of the Florida Gators swimming and diving teams:

Name	Sport	Years	Accomplishments
Theresa Andrews	Swimming	1981–83	Theresa Andrews earned eighteen All-American honors as a Gator along with 3 NCAA titles alongside Florida's first national team championship in 1982. She later went on to win gold medals in both the 100-meter backstroke and 400-meter medley relay at the 1984 Olympics.
Elizabeth L. Beisel	Swimming	2011–14	Elizabeth Beisel earned eighteen All-American honors as a Gator swimmer, and won two NCAA titles, one in the 200 backstroke & one in the 400 IM. She also made 20 All-SEC teams & won 9 SEC titles. She won two medals at the 2012 Olympics–silver in the 400 IM & bronze in the 200 back.
Tami L. Bruce	Swimming	1986–89	Tami Bruce earned thirteen All-American honors as a Gator swimmer, and won six individual NCAA national titles and one NCAA national relay title as a member of a Gators relay team. Bruce was a member of the 1988 U.S. Olympic team and placed fourth in the 400-meter freestyle and fifth in the 800-meter freestyle events.
Caroline S. Burckle	Swimming	2005–08	Caroline Burckle received twenty-three All-American honors and the Honda Award & NCAA Swimmer of the Year in 2008. She won two national titles later that year in the 200 & 500-meter freestyle and at the Olympics, she won a bronze medal in the U.S. 800-meter freestyle relay.
Amy L. Caulkins	Swimming	1980–83	Amy Caulkins received twenty-two All-American honors in four years of college swimming. She also won one individual NCAA national title in the 100-meter freestyle event, another NCAA national title as a member of the Gators winning 200-meter medley relay team, and was a key contributor to the Gators' 1982 NCAA national team championship.
Tracy Caulkins Stockwell	Swimming	1982–84	In three years a Gator swimmer, Tracy Caulkins earned twenty-one All-American honors—the maximum number possible three years. She won sixteen NCAA national titles, including an unprecedented twelve individual NCAA titles, and four more NCAA titles as a member of the Gators relay teams. Unable to compete in the 1980 Moscow Olympics because of the American-led boycott, Caulkins won three Olympic gold medals in 1984.
Julie Gorman	Swimming	1987–90	Julie Gorman received thirteen All-American honors during her four years as a college swimmer. She won four individual NCAA national titles, including the 100-meter individual medley, the 200-meter individual medley, and the 100-meter butterfly twice; she won two more NCAA national titles as a member of the Gators' winning relay teams in the 400-meter medley relay.
Nicole L. Haislett	Swimming	1991–94	Nicole Haislett was able to swim every stroke well, and received twenty-eight All-American honors in her four years as a Gator swimmer—the maximum number possible. She won six individual NCAA national titles, and two NCAA titles as a member of Gators relay teams. Haislett also won three world championship titles in 1991, and three Olympic gold medals in 1992.
Susan E. Halfacre	Swimming	1973–76	Susan Halfacre received three All-American honors. Remarkably, she served as the head coach of the Gators women's team while competing as an athlete for three years. Under her guidance, the Gators finished eighth, eighth and nineteenth in three AIAW national team championships. Halfacre won an individual AIAW national title in the 400-meter freestyle, and two more AIAW national titles as a member of Gators relay teams.
Renee A. Laravie-Kelly	Swimming	1977–79	Rene Laravie received ten All-American honors during her three-year college swimming career. She won three individual AIAW national titles, including the 100-meter breaststroke, 100-meter and 200-meter individual medley events, and two more AIAW national titles as a member of the Gators' winning relay teams in the 800-meter freestyle relay. Laravie was a key contributor to the Gators' 1979 AIAW national team championship.
Kristen Linehan Omli	Swimming	1988–91	Kristen Linehan was a thirteen-time All-American who won NCAA titles in the 100 & 200-yard backstroke in back-to-back years, as well as team titles in the 200 & 400-medley. She also won 5 individual SEC titles–three times in the 100-yard backstroke, and twice in the 200-yard backstroke, on top of three SEC relay championships.
Mimosa L. McNerney	Swimming	1993–96	Mimosa McNerney was a long-distance freestyle specialist. During her four years as a Gator swimmer, she earned seven All-American honors, and won four individual NCAA national championships—three times in the 1,650-meter freestyle, and once in the 500-meter freestyle.
Megan Neyer	Diving	1982–84, 1986	Diver Megan Neyer was a favorite to win a gold medal as a member of the 1980 U.S. Olympic team, but was unable to compete because of the American-led boycott of the Moscow Olympics. As a Gator, she received eight All-American honors–the maximum number possible for a college diver. Neyer also won eight individual NCAA national titles, sweeping the one-meter and three-meter springboard events all four years she competed.
Gemma M. Spofforth	Swimming	2007–10	Gemma Spofforth was an eleven-time All-American who won seven NCAA titles–three each in the 100 & 200-yard backstrokes, and once in the 200-yard freestyle relay. She was also a key contributor to helping the Gators win the national team championship in 2010. She represented the Great Britain at the 2012 Olympics, finishing fifth in the 100-meter backstroke.
Dara G. Torres	Swimming (Note: Torres also played volleyball for the Gators in the 1989 season (part of the 1989–90 school year), after having exhausted her NCAA eligibility as a swimmer. NCAA rules allow five total academic years of athletic eligibility, though no more than four in any one sport.)	1986–89	Demonstrating her versatility, Dara Torres earned twenty-eight All-American honors in four years as a college swimmer—the maximum number possible. She won three individual NCAA national titles and was a member of five Gators relay teams that won NCAA national championships. Torres is a twelve-time Olympic medalist, most recently winning three silver medals in the 2008 Olympics as a 41-year-old.
Kathleen Treible Slaton	Swimming	1981–84	In four years as a Gator swimmer, Kathy Treible received twenty-eight All-American honors—the maximum number an individual college swimmer can earn. She was a key member of the 1982 Gators women's team that won the NCAA national team championship, winning three individual NCAA national titles in breaststroke events in 1982, for a total of six individual NCAA titles and five NCAA relay team titles during her career.
Mary Wayte Bradburne	Swimming	1984–87	Mary Wayte earned twenty-six All-American honors during her four years as a Gator swimmer. She won eight NCAA national titles, two in individual events, and six more as a member of Gators relay teams. In two different Olympics, Wayte won four Olympic medals, including two golds, a silver and a bronze.
Stephanie Zunich Donley	Swimming	1988–91	Stephanie Zunich earned twenty All-American honors during her four years as a Gator swimmer. She won back-to-back NCAA titles in the 100 breaststroke, as well as five more as a member of Gators relay teams.

== Men's tennis ==
The following Gator Greats are former members of the Florida Gators men's tennis team:

Name	Sport	Years	Accomplishments
Harold C. "Chap" Brown	Tennis	1975–78	Chap Brown was a four-time All-SEC selection.
Mark B. Merklein	Tennis	1991–94	Mark Merklein was a four-time All-SEC selection and a four-time All-American. He and partner David Blair won the NCAA national doubles championship in 1993. Merklein won the NCAA national singles championship in 1994. During the 1994 NCAA tennis tournament, he dominated the competition, losing only one set.
Hamid Mirzadeh	Tennis	2001–05	Hamid Mirzadeh was a five-time All-American selection & a four-time first-team All-SEC. He led the Gators to 2 SEC titles and was the only Division I player to advance to the singles & doubles quarterfinals at the 2004 NCAA Championships.
Jeffrey A. Morrison	Tennis	1998–2000	Jeff Morrison was a three-time All-SEC selection and a four-time All-American. Morrison won the NCAA national singles championship in 1999, losing only one set of thirteen played against six NCAA tournament opponents.
Armistead C. Neely	Tennis	1967–69	Armistead Neely was a three-time All-SEC selection and two-time All-American. Neely won SEC singles championships in 1967 and 1969, and SEC doubles championships in 1968 and 1969. Neely later served as the Atlanta WCT Peachtree Grand Prix event director, the circuit coordinator for the USTA, and head coach of the Alabama Crimson Tide men's tennis team.
Justin M. O'Neal	Tennis	1997–2000	Justin O'Neal was a two-time first-team All-SEC selection, and a three-time All-American. O'Neal holds the Gators record for career singles victories.
Greg Ouellette	Tennis	2005–08	Greg Ouellette was a five-time All-American and four-time first-team All-SEC. The 2008 SEC Player of the Year, he was a member of the 2005 SEC championship team & finished with the fifth-most overall wins in program history at 181.
James G. Pressly Jr.	Tennis	1967–69	Jamie Pressly compiled a 60–3 singles record in three years, and was an SEC doubles champion and three-time SEC singles champion. Pressly was a three-time All-SEC selection and a 1969 All-American.
James A. Shaffer	Tennis	1961–62, 1964	Jim Shaffer was a two-time SEC singles champion (1961, 1962), and received All-American honors in 1961 after advancing to the NCAA singles championship quarterfinals.
William A. Tym	Tennis	1961, 1963–64	Bill Tym was a two-time SEC singles champion, and a 1963 All-American. Tym later served as the head coach of the Vanderbilt Commodores men's tennis team, and also as the president and executive director of the United States Tennis Association (USTA).

== Women's tennis ==
The following Gator Greats are former members of the Florida Gators women's tennis team:

Name	Sport	Years	Accomplishments
Judy Acker-Smith	Tennis	1975–78	Judy Acker was named to the first-ever All-America women's tennis team in 1976. Acker and her doubles partner, sister Sherry Acker, finished third in the AIAW national championship tournament, leading the Lady Gators to a fifth-place finish in the AIAW national team championships in 1977. Again led by Acker, the team finished fourth in the 1978 AIAW national championship tournament.
Jillian Alexander Brower	Tennis	1989–91	Jillian Alexander received three All-American honors. Alexander and her partner Nicole Arendt won the 1991 NCAA doubles national championship, winning twelve of thirteen sets played in the six rounds of the NCAA tournament.
Nicole J. Arendt	Tennis	1988–91	Nicole Arendt was a six-time first-team All-SEC selection, and earned eight All-American honors—four each in singles and doubles. She and her partner Jillian Alexander won the 1991 NCAA doubles national championship, losing only one tournament set of thirteen played. Arendt also was the singles runner-up at the 1990 NCAA national tournament. As a professional, she won sixteen doubles tournaments.
Dawn A. Buth	Tennis	1995–98	Dawn Buth received seven All-American honors: four in doubles and three in singles. Buth and partner Stephanie Nickitas won the 1996 and 1997 NCAA doubles national championships, and lost in the final of the 1998 NCAA championship. She was also a member of the Gators' NCAA national championship teams in 1996 and 1998.
Jill N. Craybas	Tennis	1995–96	Jill Craybas was a two-time first-team All-SEC selection and a two-time All-American. She won the 1996 NCAA singles tennis national championship, winning twelve of thirteen sets that she played in the tournament. Craybas was also a member of the Gators' NCAA national championship team in 1996. As a touring pro, she has won five singles events.
Cissie Donigan	Tennis	1979–82	Cissie Donigan was a first-team All-SEC selection and an All-American. Donigan won two SEC singles championships, once as the team's No. 5 player, and once as the No. 1. She also won two SEC doubles championships, both times with partner Ilene Friedland.
Lauren Embree	Tennis	2009–13	Lauren Embree was a five-time All-American & three-time SEC Player of the Year who helped lead the Gators to the 2011 & 2012 NCAA national championships, winning NCAA Championships Most Outstanding Player in both. She left with 236 total wins, the fifth-most in program history, a .880 singles winning percentage (3rd), and a .935 winning percentage in dual match singles (2nd). She served as an assistant coach at Pepperdine before returning to Florida as an assistant coach from 2019 to 2023.
Andrea M. Farley	Tennis	1990–93	Andrea Farley was a three-time first-team All-SEC selection, and a three-time All-American. Farley was a member of the Gators' 1992 NCAA national championship team.
Alexis Gordon	Tennis	2002–04; 2006	Alexis Gordon was a four-time first-team All-American and a five-time first-team All-SEC. The 2004 SEC Female Tennis Player of the Year was also a member of the Gators' 2003 NCAA national championship team.
Jill Hetherington Hultquist	Tennis	1984–87	Jill Hetherington was a four-time first-team All-SEC selection and received four All-American honors. She won four straight SEC singles championships, three as the team's No. 2 singles player, and once at No. 1; she also won three consecutive SEC doubles championships. Hetherington won fourteen events as a pro, and is currently the head coach of the Washington Huskies women's tennis team.
Jessica Lehnhoff	Tennis	1999–2002	Jessica Lehnhoff was a seven-time All-American who won the 2001 NCAA women's doubles championship with her partner Whitney Leiho. She was also a member of the 1999 & 2001 SEC championship teams for the Gators.
Stephanie I. Nickitas	Tennis	1996–99	Stephanie Nickitas was a six-time All-American: twice in singles and four times in doubles. With partner Dawn Buth, she won the NCAA doubles national championships in 1996 and 1997, and played for a third NCAA doubles title in 1998 before losing in the final. Nickitas was also a member of the Gators' NCAA national championship teams in 1996 and 1998.
Lisa Raymond	Tennis	1992–93	In two years as a Lady Gator tennis player, Lisa Raymond was a three-time first-team All-SEC selection, and earned All-American honors in 1992 and 1993, after winning the 1992 and 1993 NCAA singles national championships. She was also a member of the Gators' 1992 NCAA national championship team. As a professional, she has won nine Grand Slam doubles events, most recently the 2011 Wimbledon doubles championship.
Shaun Stafford-Beckish	Tennis	1987–88	Shaun Stafford was a two-time first-team All-SEC selection and an All-American in 1987 and 1988. She advanced to the final of the 1987 NCAA singles national championship before losing. She returned to the final in 1988 and won the NCAA singles national championship, after sweeping six tournament opponents in twelve straight sets.
Alice Luthy Tym	Tennis	1961–64	Alice Luthy became the de facto founder of the Florida Gators women's tennis team when she organized the University of Florida intercollegiate women's tennis club team in 1961. She later married Gator All-American Bill Tym, and became a touring professional tennis player. As a college tennis coach, she led the Chattanooga Lady Mocs to two AIAW small-college national championships.

== Men's track and field ==
The following Gator Greats are former male members of the Florida Gators track and field teams:

Name	Sport	Years	Accomplishments
Keith A. Brantly	Track & field	1982–84	Distance runner Keith Brantly received All-American honors in the indoor two-mile run and twice in the 10,000-meter run. He won the SEC outdoor championships in the 10,000 meters in 1982 and 1983. Brantly was a member of the 1996 U.S. Olympic team, and finished twenty-eighth in the world in the Olympic marathon run.
Beaufort A. Brown	Track & field	1973–75	Sprinter Beaufort Brown won the SEC and NCAA indoor national championships in the 600-yard run in 1973. Brown was an All-American as a member of the Gators 4×440-yard relay teams that won the NCAA indoor championship in 1975, and three SEC indoor championships and one outdoor championship in the same event.
Kerron S. Clement	Track & field	2003–05	Kerron Clement was an eleven-time All-American who finished with 7 SEC titles and 4 NCAA titles–two in the 400-meter hurdles, one in the 400-meter sprint, and the last anchoring Florida's 4×400-meter relay team. Clement has won 4 gold medals at the World Championships & 2 Olympic golds in the 400-meter hurdles & 4×400-meter relay for the U.S., as well as a silver medal at the 2008 Olympics in the 400-meter hurdles.
R. Michael Cotton	Track & field	1971–73	Pole-vaulter Mike Cotton earned All-American honors with a vault of seventeen feet in 1973. He won three SEC championships in the pole vault—one indoor and two outdoor.
Omar Craddock	Track & field	2010–13	Omar Craddock earned seven All-American honors with the Gators, winning the NCAA indoor triple jump championship & back-to-back outdoor titles in 2012 & 2013. In addition, he helped Florida win their first indoor national championship in 2010 & their first SEC outdoor championship in 25 years.
Jeffery B. Demps	Track & field Football	2008–12	Jeff Demps won three straight NCAA indoor titles in the 60-meter run from 2010 to 2012 in addition to winning both the 100-meter and 4×100-meter titles at the 2010 outdoor championships. He finished his track career with 4 NCAA team titles and 2 SEC team titles. In addition to an outstanding track career, Demps also ranks top 10 all time in career rushing yards for the Gators.
Marquis Dendy	Track & field	2012–15	Marquis Dendy won seven NCAA & SEC individual championships over his four years at Florida. His school records in the long jump and triple jump, set in 2015, are still standing. The 2016 World Indoor Champion in the long jump, Dendy became the first Gator to win the Bowerman Trophy, awarded to the best track & field athlete of the year.
Dedric Dukes	Track & field	2012–15	Dedric Dukes was a member of the Gators' relay team that won back-to-back NCAA indoor national titles in 2012 and 2013. An outdoor national champion in the 200 meters in 2014, he also was a member of four national championship relay teams and received 17 All-American honors during his time at UF.
Scott Dykehouse	Track & field	1977	In 1977, javelin thrower Scott Dykehouse received All-American honors for his NCAA national championship throw of 258 feet, five inches, and also won the SEC outdoor championship in the same event.
D. Mark Everett	Track & field	1987–90	Middle-distance runner Mark Everett was a member of the Gators' relay team that won the NCAA indoor national championship in the 4×400-meters in 1988, four consecutive SEC outdoor championships and three of four SEC indoor championships in the same event. Everett also won both the NCAA indoor and outdoor national championships in the 800-meter run in 1990, and four consecutive SEC outdoor championships in the 800 meters.
William A. Freeman	Track & field	1974–76	Pole vaulter Will Freeman won three SEC indoor championships and two SEC outdoor championships in his event. He earned All-American honors with a vault of seventeen feet in 1976, and was a member of the first Gators team to win an SEC indoor track championship in 1975. He has been the head coach of the Grinnell College track team since 1980.
Ellis B. Goodloe	Track & field	1957–59	Sprinter Ellis Goodloe won an SEC indoor championship in the 60-yard dash, and SEC outdoor championships in the 100-yard dash and three times as a member of the Gators' 4×110-yard relay team.
J. Lewis "Papa" Hall Jr.	Football; Track & field	1950–52; 1951–53	Papa Hall was a two-sport Gator standout in football and track and field. As a member of the Gators track and field team, Hall won the individual NCAA national championship in the high jump in 1951 and again in 1953, as well as the 1953 SEC championship in the same event. He was recognized as an All-American in 1951 and 1953.
Michael M. Holloway	Track & field	1988–90, 1992	Mike Holloway won four SEC outdoor championships in the pole vault in 1988, 1989, 1990 and 1992, and one SEC indoor championship in 1992. Holloway earned three All-American honors with vaults over eighteen feet.
Ronald L. Jourdan	Track & field	1968–70	High jumper Ron Jourdan was a two-time All-American, and won the NCAA indoor national championship in the high jump in 1969. He won four consecutive SEC indoor and outdoor championships in the high jump in 1969 and 1970. Jourdan was a member of the 1972 U.S. Olympic team, and was the first Gators track and field athlete to participate in the Olympic Games.
Jack D. McGriff	Track & field	1940–41; 1946–47	Sprinter Jack McGriff was a standout 100-yard dash specialist whose undergraduate career was interrupted by World War II. After serving as a first lieutenant in the U.S. Army air forces, he returned to Gainesville and was elected team captain by his teammates in 1946. He later served as a member of the Florida Board of Regents.
Dennis A. Mitchell	Track & field	1985, 1987–89	All-American sprinter Dennis Mitchell won the NCAA indoor national championship in the 200 meters in 1988, and the NCAA outdoor national championship in the same event in 1989. He was also a member of the Gators' indoor national championship relay team in the 4×400-meters in 1988. Mitchell won an Olympic gold medal as a member of the winning U.S. team in the 4×100-meters relay in 1992, and a silver in the same event in 1996.
John Morton	Track & field	1967–69	With consecutive throws of 181 feet, discus thrower John Morton earned All-American honors in 1967 and 1968. Morton won one SEC indoor championship in the shot put, and SEC outdoor championships in the shot put twice and the discus three times.
R. Earl Poucher	Track & field	1953–56	Pole vaulter Earl Poucher was an All-American and the NCAA outdoor national champion in his event in 1954. Poucher also won four straight SEC outdoor championships in the pole vault.
James Pringle	Track & field	1978–80	High jumper Jim Pringle was a two-time All-American who won the NCAA indoor national championship in his event in 1979, and SEC indoor championships in 1979 and 1980.
Christian Taylor	Track & field	2009–11	Christian Taylor was a four-time NCAA champion in the triple jump & won 2 NCAA team titles. Since then, he has won 4 world championships (2011, 2015, 2017, 2019) & 2 Olympic golds in the triple jump in 2012 & 2016.
W. Henry Wadsworth	Track & field	1960	Pole vaulter Henry Wadsworth earned All-American honors and was the NCAA national runner-up in 1960. Wadsworth also won SEC outdoor championships in the pole vault and high jump that same year.
Josh Walker	Track & field	2002–05	Josh Walker was a six-time All-American, capturing the NCAA outdoor 110-meter hurdles national championship in both 2004 & 2005. He held the school record for the 110 hurdles for over 14 years and was a member of the 2004 SEC indoor championship team.
William J. "Bumper" Watson	Track & field	1954–55, 1958	Bumper Watson was an All-American in the 100-yard dash in 1955 with his NCAA national runner-up time of 9.7 seconds. Watson won the SEC outdoor championship in the 220-yard dash in 1955, and was a member of the Gators' SEC-winning relay team in the 4×110-yard event in 1954, 1955 and 1958.

== Women's track and field ==
The following Gator Greats are former female members of the Florida Gators track and field teams:

Name	Sport	Years	Accomplishments
Nekita Beasley	Track & field	1991–92	Nekita Beasley was an eight-time All-American who won the 1991 & 1992 NCAA outdoor 800-meter titles, 1992 indoor & outdoor 4×400-meter relay NCAA titles, 3 SEC 800-meter titles and the 1991 SEC outdoor 4×400-meter relay title. She finished her career as the school record holder for the 800-meter in both indoor & outdoor categories.
Charlotte Browning	Track & field Cross country	2008–10	Charlotte Browning won 2 NCAA individual titles and 3 SEC individual titles in the one-mile, 1500 & 3000 meter runs. Her school records in the mile and 1500 meter runs in 2010 helped lead the Gators to a seventh-place finish at that year's NCAA Championships, which is still the highest finish in school history.
Hazel M. Clark-Riley	Track & field	1996–99	Middle-distance runner Hazel Clark received twelve All-American honors, and was a three-time NCAA national champion in the 800-meter run (twice indoors, once outdoors). She also won four SEC indoor and two outdoor championships in the 800 meters, one in the 1,500 meters, and was also a member of four different SEC championship relay teams. Clark finished seventh in the world in the 800 meters at the 2000 Olympics.
Beth Farmer	Track & field Cross country	1982–85	Beth Farmer was a six-time All-American, four for track & two for cross country. She won 4 SEC titles, two for the 10K outdoor & two for the 3K indoor.
Michelle Freeman	Track & field	1991–92	Michelle Freeman was a member of the Gators' relay that won the NCAA indoor and outdoor national championships in the 4×400-meters, won an individual NCAA outdoor national championships in the 100-meter hurdles, and received eight All-American honors. Freeman finished sixth in the world in the 100-meter hurdles and won a bronze medal as a member of Jamaica's team in the 4×100-meter relay at the 1996 Olympics.
Heidi Hertz Sweet	Track & field	1976	Heidi Hertz won the 1976 NCAA indoor national championship in the pentathlon with a total of 3,805 points. She was the first Gators women's track and field athlete who won an individual NCAA national championship.
Anita Howard	Track & field	1990–91	Sprinter Anita Howard received seventeen All-American honors. She was a member of the Gators' relay teams that won the NCAA indoor nation championship in the 4×400-meter event in 1990, and the NCAA indoor and outdoor national championships in the same event in 1992. Howard also won an individual NCAA outdoor championship in the 400-meter run in 1992.
Kisha Jett	Track & field	1995–98	Kisha Jett was a nineteen-time All-American, the most in Florida history. A three-time SEC champion (one 55 meter, two 4×400 outdoor relay) and 1996 NCAA indoor 200 meter bronze medalist, she held the 200 meter record for 12 years and helped Florida to win 3 SEC team titles.
Mariam Kevkhishvili Machavariani	Track & field	2007–10	Mariam Kevkhishvili tied the school record with 5 individual NCAA shot put titles as well as 5 SEC shot put titles. An eight-time All-American, she was the second woman in NCAA history to win consecutive indoor & outdoor shot put titles and helped the Gators win two SEC titles.
Leah Kirklin Anderson	Track & field	1990–92	Six-time All-American Leah Kirklin won three NCAA national championships in the triple jump (two indoors, one outdoors). She was also a four-time SEC champion in the triple jump (twice indoors, twice outdoors).
Genevieve LaCaze-Gregson	Track & field	2008–12	Genevieve LaCaze became the first Gator to break the ten-minute mark in the 3000 meter steeplechase at the 2012 NCAA Outdoor Championships, a record that still stands. In addition, she was a four-time All-American, six-time All-SEC selection, and three-time SEC outdoor champion, becoming the first woman in SEC history to sweep the 1500 meter, 3000 meter, and 5000 meter events at the outdoor championships. She competed for Australia at both the 2012 & 2016 Olympics.
Colleen Rosensteel	Track & field	1986–89	Colleen Rosensteel was a six-time All-American in track and field. She dominated the SEC throwing events during the 1988 and 1989 indoor and outdoor seasons, winning six SEC individual championship—four times in the shot put and twice in the discus. After college, she competed in judo at the 1992, 1996 and 2000 Olympics, reaching the semifinals in 2000.
Candice H. Scott	Track & field	2001–05	Candice Scott was a ten-time All-American who won 5 NCAA titles–three in the indoor weight throw and two in the hammer throw. A ten-time SEC champion, she holds school records in both categories.
Rochelle Steely	Cross country Track & field	1982–84; 1983–85	Shelly Steely earned two All-American honors in cross country and three in track. In addition to SEC indoor championships in the distance medley relay in 1984 and the two-mile run in 1985, Steely dominated the outdoor distance events in 1984 and 1985, winning two SEC championships in the 3,000 meters, two in the 5,000 meters, and one in the 10,000 meters. She finished seventh in the world in the 3,000 meters at the 1992 Olympics.
Becki Wells	Cross country Track & field	1995–97	Becki Wells was a five-time track All-American who won the 1997 NCAA indoor mile title and the 1997 outdoor 1,500 meter title. A 2-time SEC cross country champion, she also won 6 SEC titles in track as well as 4 team titles in both sports. She held the mile & 1,500 meter school records for over 13 years.

== Women's volleyball ==
The following Gator Greats are former members of the Florida Gators volleyball team:

Name	Sport	Years	Accomplishments
Jane Collymore	Volleyball	2002–05	Jane Collymore was a three-time All-American, a three-time All-SEC selection, and two-time SEC Player of the Year. She led the Gators to four consecutive SEC championships, an appearance in the NCAA championship final in 2003, and ranks second all-time in attacks (4,076), third in aces (176), and fourth in both kills (1,629) and points (1,944).
Áurea Cruz	Volleyball	2000–03	Aury Cruz was a three-time first-team All-American, a three-time first-team All-SEC selection, and three-time SEC Player of the Year. Cruz holds the Gators career records for kills (1,855) and points (2,188.5), and led the Gators to four consecutive SEC championships and an appearance in the NCAA championship final in 2003. She was also a member of the Puerto Rican national team.
Aycan Gokberk	Volleyball	1992–95	Aycan Gokberk was a two-time first-team All-SEC selection, a three-time first-team All-American, and a two-time Academic All-American. She was the SEC Player of the Year in 1993 and 1995. During her four years as a Gator, she had 1,721 career kills, the team won four consecutive SEC championships, and made NCAA Final Four appearances in 1992 and 1993.
Benavia Jenkins	Volleyball	2000–03	Benavia Jenkins was a three-time All-American and a four-time first-team All-SEC selection. Jenkins holds the Gator career record for most blocks (601), and led the Gators to four consecutive SEC championships and an appearance in the NCAA championship final in 2003. She currently serves as an assistant coach at Michigan after 4 seasons as the head coach at East Tennessee State.
Jenny Manz Theis	Volleyball	1996–99	Rightside hitter Jenny Manz was a three-time first-team All-SEC selection and a two-time All-American. She was the SEC Player of the Year in 1998 and 1999. During her four-season career as a Gator, Manz had 152 service aces, the team won four consecutive SEC championships and made NCAA Final Four appearances in 1996, 1997 and 1998.
Nicole McCray Thorn	Volleyball	1999–2002	Nicole McCray was a three-time All-American and three-time first-team All-SEC selection. She was the SEC Player of the Year in 2000 and played on four SEC championship teams, including the team that made a Final Four appearance in 2002. She ranks third all-time in blocks with 529.
Angie McGinnis	Volleyball	2004–07	Angie McGinnis was a three-time All-American and SEC Player of the Year in both 2006 & 2007. She is also the career leader in total assists (5,784) and assists per set (12.88).
Kelly A. Murphy	Volleyball	2008–11	Kelly Murphy became the first Gator to make four All-America teams. An SEC Player of the Year, National Freshman of the Year and two-time NCAA Regional all-tournament team member, she holds Florida career records with 76 double-doubles and 30 triple-doubles. She also won a bronze medal with the U.S. national volleyball team at the 2016 Olympics.
Gudula Staub	Volleyball	1991–92	Gudula Staub was a two-time first-team All-SEC selection and a two-time first-team All-American. She was the SEC Player of the Year in 1992. She averaged 5.36 points per set, third on the Gators' career records list. During Staub's two-year college career, the Gators won two consecutive SEC championships, and appeared in the NCAA Final Four in 1992. She also represented Germany in women's beach volleyball at the 2000 Olympics.

== Wrestling ==
The following Gator Greats are former members of the Florida Gators wrestling team:

Name	Sport	Years	Accomplishments
Jeff Davis	Wrestling	1972–75	Jeff Davis was a four-time All-SEC selection and the captain of the Gators' undefeated 1975 SEC championship team. Davis later served as an assistant wrestling coach for the Gators from 1975 to 1979. He was inducted into the National Wrestling Hall of Fame in 2004.

== Distinguished Letterwinners ==
The following list of Distinguished Letterwinners includes former Florida Gators athletes who have achieved distinction in their careers after college; among them are notable head coaches, political officeholders, business executives, and educators.

Name	Sport	Years	Accomplishments
Jerry "Red" Anderson	Football	1964–66	Red Anderson played football while he was a University of Florida undergraduate, and was the senior team captain of the Florida Gators football team in 1966. Anderson later became a college football coach, and served as a long-time assistant for four different programs, including fourteen seasons for the Gators. As an assistant coach under Steve Spurrier, Anderson served as the defensive line coach and assistant head coach. Under coach Ron Zook, Anderson served as defensive line coach. He was also the interim head coach of the UCF Knights in 1984.
J. Eldridge Beach	Football	1947–50	Eldridge Beach joined the U.S. Marine Corps straight out of high school and saw action in the South Pacific, where he received the Purple Heart for wounds sustained at the Battle of Okinawa and a Presidential Unit Citation before being discharged in 1946. After four seasons playing running back for the Gators, he joined the Florida Highway Patrol in 1951, but left the following year. After a 5-year absence, he rejoined the FHP in 1957, rising through the ranks to become a colonel and eventually Director of the FHP from 1972 to 1982.
Steve Beeland	Tennis	1967–69	Steve Beeland was a 4-time SEC champion, winning twice in singles & twice in doubles with his partner Armistead Neely. He became the head coach for the Florida women's tennis team from 1982 to 1984, where he led them to two undefeated conference records and SEC first-place finishes in 1982 & 1984. He then became the head men's coach from 1985 to 1988.
Floyd T. Christian	Football; Basketball	1934–36; 1935–37	Floyd Christian played football and basketball while he was a University of Florida undergraduate, and was the senior team captain of the Florida Gators basketball team in 1937. Christian was a highly decorated World War II veteran who was later elected Commissioner of Education for the State of Florida.
Douglas A. Dickey	Football; Baseball	1951–53; 1952–53	Doug Dickey was the Gators' starting quarterback in 1952 and 1953, and led the team to its first-ever NCAA-sanctioned bowl game in 1952. He later became the head football coach of the Tennessee Volunteers and the Florida Gators, winning two SEC championships with Tennessee. After retiring from coaching, he served as the Tennessee Volunteers athletic director, and was inducted into the College Football Hall of Fame as a coach.
Jimmy Dunn	Football	1956–58	Jimmy Dunn was a three-year starter at quarterback and free safety, became the first quarterback to lead the Gators to three consecutive victories over the Georgia Bulldogs, and received the Fergie Ferguson Award in 1958. He later became the offensive coordinator for the Tennessee Volunteers and the Gators under head coach Doug Dickey.
William E. Harlan	Swimming	1963–76	Bill Harlan was a strong Gator swimmer in the late 1940s, and became an instructor in the physical education department. He later served as the head coach of the Florida Gators men's swimming and diving team for thirteen years, during which his swimmers won eight SEC team championships and compiled a dual meet record of 109–25.
C. Kimberlin Helton	Football	1967–69	Kim Helton was the starting center for the Gators football team from 1967 to 1969. Helton later became the offensive coordinator for the Miami Hurricanes during their first national championship season, the offensive line coach for the Tampa Bay Buccaneers, Houston Oilers and Los Angeles Raiders of the NFL, and the head coach of the Houston Cougars football team.
Gelindo Infante	Football	1960–62	Lindy Infante was a running back for the Florida Gators football team from 1960 to 1962. He later became the head coach of the Jacksonville Bulls of the USFL, and the Green Bay Packers and the Indianapolis Colts of the NFL.
Jack Katz	Football	1962–64	Jack Katz was a two-way offensive and defensive lineman for the Florida Gators football team. Katz later became the founder, president and chief executive officer of the Panama Jack Company.
Tommy R. Kelley	Football	1960–62	Tom Kelley was a two-way offensive and defensive lineman for the Florida Gators football team. He was chosen to the 1960 All-SEC Sophomore team. Kelley became a well-known civil engineering consultant in the greater Orlando, Florida area, a long-time Gators booster, and a president of the F Club.
Julian B. Lane	Football	1934–36	Julian Lane was a two-way offensive and defensive lineman, and the senior team captain of the Florida Gators football team in 1936. Lane was later elected Mayor of Tampa, and afterward, as a member of the Florida House of Representatives and the Florida Senate.
William J. "Red" Mitchum	Football	1948–51	Lineman Red Mitchum was a Gators football letterman in 1950 and 1951, and the first student to serve as master of ceremonies at the university's homecoming pep rally, Gator Growl. As a graduate, he became a roving ambassador and successful fundraiser for the Florida Gators sports program, and a well-known speaker at Gators alumni events remembered for his humorous anecdotes of Gators football in the 1940s and 1950s.
R. Larry Morris	Football	1970–72	Larry Morris was a Gators football letterman in 1970 and 1972. He later served as a graduate assistant football coach in 1973, and became a prominent trial attorney and financial supporter of the Florida Gators sports program.
Stephen C. O'Connell	Boxing	1935–38	Steve O'Connell won the SEC middleweight championship as a member the Florida Gators boxing team. O'Connell served as an associate and chief justice of the Florida Supreme Court, and later became the first alumnus to serve as the president of the University of Florida. The university's main indoor sports arena, O'Connell Center, bears his name.
Frederick S. Ridley	Golf	1973	Fred Ridley was a member of the Florida Gators men's golf team in the 1970s. He won the U.S. Amateur Championship in 1975, and was elected president of the United States Golf Association in 2004. Most recently, he became chairman of Augusta National Golf Club, host and organizer of the Masters Tournament, in 2017.
William A. Shands	Football	1908	Bill Shands played for the Florida football team before it was known as the "Gators," and was one of its stars in the early 1900s. He became an attorney and was elected to the Florida Senate; his fellow state senators later selected him as the senate president. Shands is remembered as the legislative driving force behind the founding of the University of Florida medical school and teaching hospital—now known as Shands Hospital.
George A. Smathers	Basketball	1934–36	George Smathers was a standout member of the Florida Gators men's basketball team from 1934 to 1936 and was its captain as a senior. Smathers was later elected to the U.S. House of Representative (1947–1951) and the U.S. Senate (1951–1969) from the state of Florida.
Dennis K. "Dutch" Stanley	Football; Track & field	1926–28; 1927–29	Dutch Stanley was a two-way end on the great Florida Gators football teams of 1927 and 1928. He later returned to his alma mater as the Gators head football coach from 1933 to 1935. He was also the head coach of the Gators tennis team and track and field team, and later served as the founding dean of the university's College of Health and Human Performance for over thirty years.
Larry L. Travis	Football	1960–62	Larry Travis was an All-SEC two-way offensive and defensive lineman for the Florida Gators football team. After graduation, he was an assistant football coach for five Division I football programs, including Florida, and became the associate athletic director for the U.S. Naval Academy and Georgia Tech, then the athletic director for Kansas State and Western Carolina. Travis is currently the mayor of High Springs, Florida.
Keith R. Tribble	Football	1974–76	Keith Tribble was an offensive lineman for the Florida Gators football team in the mid-1970s. Tribble became the chief executive officer of the Orange Bowl organizing committee, and later became the athletic director of the University of Central Florida Knights sports program.
Harrison M. Wilder	Swimming	1961–63	Harry Wilder was a key contributor to the Gators' three consecutive SEC swimming and diving championships in 1961, 1962 and 1963, as a member of five conference champion relay teams. Wilder later became the owner of a successful group of McDonald's franchises, a long-time member of the board of directors of Gators Boosters, Inc., and a major financial supporter of the Florida Gators swimming and diving teams.

== Honorary Letterwinners ==
The following list of Honorary Letterwinners includes former coaches whose Florida Gators teams won national championships, one who later became the Chief Justice of the Florida Supreme Court, another who later served as the U.S. Army four-star general commanding United Nations armed forces during the Korean War, and the university medical researcher who formulated the sports drink Gatorade.

Name	Sport	Years	Accomplishments
Stewart M. "Buddy" Alexander	Men's golf	1988–2014	Buddy Alexander was the head coach of Florida's men's golf team for 27 years, winning national championships in 1993 & 2001, 8 SEC titles and 6 SEC Coach of the Year awards during his tenure.
Ruth Alexander	Administrator	1972–81	Ruth Alexander was the driving force behind the founding of the Florida Gators women's sports program. As a physical education professor and associate athletic director, she assumed responsibility for the rapid expansion of the Florida Gators women's sports program during the 1970s. Alexander was also a key person in the organization of the AIAW, the governing body for women's college sports until 1983.
Charles W. Bachman Jr.	Football	1928–32	Charlie Bachman was the head coach of the 1928 Florida Gators football team that produced a new national scoring record and the best win–loss record in the first eighty-nine years of Gators football. Bachman was inducted into the College Football Hall of Fame in 1978.
Percy M. Beard	Track & field	1937–64	Percy Beard was an Olympic silver medalist in the 120-meter hurdles in the 1932 Olympics. He became the head coach of the Florida Gators track and field team in 1937 and let the team for twenty-eight seasons, including two SEC team championships. Drawing on his Auburn civil engineering education, Beard developed the first all-weather track in 1959. He is the namesake of the university's track and field facility.
B. E. "Buster" Bishop	Men's golf	1964–78	Buster Bishop was the head coach of the Florida Gators men's golf team for fifteen years. During his tenure, the Gators men's golfers won four SEC team championships and two NCAA national team championships—including the 1968 NCAA national team championship—the first national team championship, in any sport, in Florida Gators history.
Otis Boggs	Broadcasting		
Andy Brandi	Women's tennis	1984–2001	Andy Brandi was the head coach of the Florida Gators women's tennis team for seventeen years. During his tenure, the Lady Gators won fourteen SEC team championships, and three NCAA national team championships, in addition to finishing as the national runners-up in five other NCAA tournaments. Brandi was recognized as the national coach of the year five times.
Rebecca L. Burleigh	Women's soccer	1995–2021	The very first head coach of the Florida Gators women's soccer team, Becky Burleigh built a team that went from the bottom of the pile to NCAA champions in 4 years. Other than that 1998 national championship team that went 26-1 and earned Burleigh the National Coach of the Year award, she took Florida back to the College Cup 3 years later and overall, the Gators went to 22 NCAA tournaments during her 26-year tenure. A five-time SEC Coach of the Year, she led the Gators to 14 SEC regular season & 12 SEC Tournament titles, coaching 37 All-Americans and 15 SEC Players of the Year over time. Her 513 career wins (431 at Florida) place her 8th all-time in career wins and her .745 winning percentage (.709 at Florida) places her tied for 20th all-time.
J. Robert Cade	Sports medicine	1961–2004	Robert Cade was a professor of nephrology at the University of Florida College of Medicine. During the 1960s, he and his research team conducted experiments with Florida Gators football players regarding water and electrolyte loss during athletic competition. His team's experiments in rehydration and electrolyte replacement led to the formulation of the sports drink Gatorade.
Norman G. Carlson	Sports Information Director	1963–2011	Norm Carlson is a University of Florida alumnus and former sports journalist who was the sports information director of the Florida Gators sports program from 1963 to 2002. Since then, Carlson has served as an assistant athletic director and the historian of the program.
Jimmy Carnes	Track & field	1965–76	Jimmy Carnes was the head coach of the Florida Gators track and field team, with 93–3 record in dual meets. Carnes was also the founder of the Florida Track Club, founder of the Sunshine State Games, head coach of the 1980 U.S. Olympic team, and the first president of USA Track & Field.
Conrad G. Demro Jr.	Financial contributor		Conrad Demro was an Army veteran & proud UF alum in both World War II & Korea who worked as a certified public accountant. He was a member of various organizations, including Pi Kappa Phi, Kappa Delta Pi, Florida Blue Key, and Delta Chi. In addition to helping with these various organizations, Demro served on the board of directors for the UF Athletic Association, the UF Foundation and was even President of the UF Alumni Association before his passing in 2003.
William J. Donovan Jr.	Basketball	1996–2015	Billy Donovan led the Gators to 4 Final Four appearances, where they won back-to-back national championships in 2006 & 2007. They also won 4 SEC tournaments & 6 SEC regular season titles, and Donovan was named SEC Coach of the Year 3 times. Since leaving Florida, Donovan has served as a head coach in the NBA for both the Oklahoma City Thunder and the Chicago Bulls.
George Edmondson	Football mascot	1949–2008	George Edmondson, more commonly known as "Mr. Two Bits," served as an unofficial mascot and cheerleader at Florida Gators football games played at Florida Field for almost sixty years. Edmondson began to lead the home crowd in the "Two Bits" cheer during the darkest days of Gators football in the late 1940s, through eight SEC titles and three national championships.
John R. Eibner	Football, Administrator	1950–73	John Eibner was an assistant coach for the Florida Gators from 1950 to 1966. He left coaching to become the director of fundraising, a position he served in until his death in 1973.
Eugene Ellenson	Football, Administrator	1960–69	Gene Ellenson was an assistant coach and the defensive coordinator of the Florida Gators football team from 1960 to 1969. He was revered by his players for his pregame motivational speeches. Ellenson later served as an associate athletic director and the head of Gator Boosters, Inc.
George F. "Bud" Fernandez	Head equipment manager	1971–2003	After serving his country for 28 years as a command sergeant major in the U.S. Army, George "Uncle Bud" Fernandez became the head equipment manager at the University of Florida in 1971, a position he held until 1992. He then became the Director of Athletic Equipment & assistant to the athletic director, where he served until his retirement in 2003.
Sol Fleischman	Broadcaster		"Salty" Sol Fleischman was a colorful figure on the televisions of Florida and the Tampa area for over 48 years. Starting as a broadcaster for WDAE straight out of high school in 1928, Fleischman could always be found giving opinions on sports and occasional fishing advice once in a while. Moving to WTVT in 1956, he remained a mainstay until his retirement in 1981.
Jeremy N. Foley	Administrator	1976–present	Jeremy Foley started at the University of Florida in 1976 as an intern in the University Athletic Association. Ten years later, he was named interim athletic director and in 1992, became full-time athletic director, a position he held until 2016. Since retiring in 2016, he has stayed active in the university as AD emeritus.
Skip Foster	Swimming, Administrator	1981–2016	Skip Foster was hired as an assistant coach for Florida's swimming & diving team, where he served until 1990. He won 2 national championships (1983 & 1984) and coached 38 All-Americans during his first time as assistant coach. He was promoted to head coach in 1991, where he served 2 years until returning as an assistant coach before leaving the team in 1995. Going 18–4 in his 2 years as head coach, he won the 1991 SEC Coach of the Year & NCAA Men's Coach of the Year awards while also winning SEC championships in both years. He went on to work with the University Athletic Association for over 20 years until his retirement in 2016.
Dave Fuller	Baseball	1947–76	Dave Fuller was the head coach of the Florida Gators baseball team for thirty years, and the longest serving coach in the history of the Florida Gators intercollegiate sports program. His 557 wins as the Gators baseball coach are more than any other coach, in any sport, in Gators history.
Frank Genovar	Swimming; Tennis	1930–51; 1941	Frank Genovar was the first head coach of the Florida Gators swimming and diving team, and served in that role for twenty-two years. During his tenure, the Gators won five SEC team swimming championships. He also coached the Florida Gators men's tennis team in 1941.
Gary R. Gerson	Financial contributor		As a student at the University of Florida in 1952, Gary Gerson helped to create the first tutoring & counseling program for student-athletes to utilize. 3 years later, he became the youngest CPA in the United States. The founder of Gerson Preston Robinson & Co. has helped to tutor Florida's student-athletes for over 70 years & counting. Appointed to the UF Foundation in 1984, Mr. Gerson has continued to use his influence to give back to his community, serving on various organization bounds in the Miami area. He was awarded an honorary membership to the Florida Blue Key fraternity in 2007.
Richard Giannini	Administrator	1966–70, 1977–86	Richard Giannini was hired as the assistant sports information director in 1966, where he served for 4 years. After stints as Duke's assistant AD & the NCAA's marketing & licensing director, he returned to UF in 1977 and served as senior associate AD for 10 years before leaving to become the CEO of Raycom Management Group, Inc., where he served until 1994. From 1995 to 2012, he served as the athletic director at both the University of Louisiana, Monroe and the University of Southern Mississippi. In 2013, he became the executive director of the Bahamas Bowl and served until 2021.
Mandell Glicksberg	Professor, Faculty representative	1953–97	A former JAG officer in the U.S. Air Force, Mandell Glicksberg joined the University of Florida as a law professor in 1953, a position he served in until his retirement in 1997. While at UF, he served as faculty advisor of the Florida Law Review, became president of the University Athletic Association Board of Directors in 1965, and served as the university's faculty representative to the SEC & NCAA for over 25 years. In the late 1980s, he became a member of the SEC Executive Committee and served as Secretary of the SEC. He was also the co-chair on the SEC committee that helped implement women's sports programs in compliance with Title IX.
S. Ray Graves	Football, Athletic Director	1960–69; 1960–79	Ray Graves was the head coach of the Florida Gators football team from 1960 to 1969. He coached the Gators to their first two major bowl appearances, compiled a 4–1 record in bowl games, and an overall win–loss record of 70–31–4. His seventy wins made him the winningest coach in the first sixty-five years of Gators football. Graves was inducted into the College Football Hall of Fame in 1990.
Ben Hill Griffin Jr.	Financial contributor		Ben Hill Griffin Jr. was a University of Florida alumnus and namesake of the university's football facility, Ben Hill Griffin Stadium. Griffin made his family fortune in citrus, cattle, and land development, and was a strong financial supporter of Florida Gators sports.
Ben Hill Griffin III	Financial contributor		Ben Hill Griffin Jr. was a University of Florida alumnus and a generous contributor to the Florida Gators sports program. Griffin was president of Alico, Inc., an agribusiness and land development company, and Citrus Hill, the family-owned citrus-growing business.
Spessard L. Holland	Supporter		Spessard Holland was an alumnus of the University of Florida College of Law. Holland was one of the founders of the law firm that became Holland & Knight, and was later elected governor of the state (1941–45) and a U.S. Senator from Florida (1946–71).
Daniel T. McCarty	Supporter		Dan McCarty was a University of Florida alumnus and decorated U.S. Army officer in World War II. He was elected speaker of the Florida House of Representatives and governor of the state.
Alfred A. McKethan	Financial contributor		Alfred McKethan was a University of Florida alumnus, citrus grower, cattleman and banker who served as the president of a small county bank that would become SunTrust Bank. McKethan was also a generous supporter of the Florida Gators sports program. He is the namesake of Alfred A. McKethan Field at the university's baseball facility, Florida Ballpark.
J. Hillis Miller Sr.	President	1947–53	J. Hillis Miller served as the fourth president of the University of Florida for six years in the late 1940s and early 1950s. A strong supporter of intercollegiate athletics, Miller was responsible for several key decisions that led to changes in the administration and financing of the Florida Gators sports program, and the upgrading of the university's sports facilities.
Bill Potter	Men's tennis	1952–77	Bill Potter was the head coach of the Florida Gators men's tennis team for twenty-six seasons. During Potter's tenure, the Gators won four SEC team championships.
Randy Reese	Swimming	1976–90	Randy Reese was the head coach of the Florida Gators swimming and diving teams for fifteen years. During his tenure, the Gators men's and women's swimmers and divers won a combined seventeen SEC team championships, and four national team championships. Reese received four national coach of the year honors.
Mimi Ryan	Women's golf	1973–94	Mimi Ryan was the first coach of the Florida Gators women's golf team. During her twenty-one years as head coach, Ryan's Lady Gators won six SEC team championships, and back-to-back NCAA national team championships in 1985 and 1986.
Harold L. "Tom" Sebring	Football	1925–27	Tom Sebring was a law student who served as the head coach of the Gators football team for three seasons in the mid-1920s. The team's 8–2 record in 1925 and 7–3 record in 1927 were the two best in the first twenty-one years of the Gators football team. Sebring became a justice of the Florida Supreme Court, a judge at the Nuremberg Trials, and the dean of the Stetson University College of Law.
George Steinbrenner	Financial contributor		George Steinbrenner was the principal owner of the New York Yankees, and several Tampa and Great Lakes-based shipping concerns. Steinbrenner was also a generous financial contributor to the Florida Gators sports program, and he and his wife donated the funds to build the Steinbrenner Band Hall.
G. A. "Pat" Summerall	Supporter		Placekicker Pat Summerall was a native of Lake City, Florida, and a ten-season veteran of the NFL before he became a national broadcaster for CBS Sports and Fox Sports.
John J. Tigert IV	President	1928–47	John Tigert was the third president of the University of Florida, and a strong advocate of intercollegiate sports. As a Vanderbilt undergraduate, he was an All-Southern halfback and a Rhodes Scholar. He later served as the U.S. Commissioner of Education for seven years. As university president, he was responsible for the construction of Florida Field, and was instrumental in the formation of the Southeastern Conference.
Gregg Troy	Swimming	1998–2018	Gregg Troy served as swimming & diving coach at the University of Florida for 21 years, winning the 2010 NCAA women's championship, 2 SEC women's championships, and 6 SEC men's championship on top of 3 combined NCAA Coach of the Year awards. Troy was also named head coach of the U.S. national swimming team at the 2012 Olympics, where he saw 16 medals won in 17 events.
James A. Van Fleet	Football	1923–24	James Van Fleet was a U.S. Army major and professor of military science in the university's ROTC program when he became the head coach of the Florida Gators football team. During his tenure, the Gators received their first national recognition with high-profile games against Alabama, Army, Georgia Tech and Texas. He later served as the commanding general of United States and United Nations armed forces during the Korean War.
Alfred C. Warrington IV	Financial contributor		Alfred Warrington is a major financial contributor to the Florida Gators sports program, and the University of Florida generally. He is the namesake of the university's Warrington College of Business Administration, and previously served as chairman of the university's board of trustees. He was formerly a national partner in Arthur Andersen and a principal investor in Waste Management, Inc.
Ernestine Weaver	Women's gymnastics	1980–92	Ernestine Weaver served as the head coach of the Florida Gators women's gymnastics team for twelve formative seasons. Her Lady Gators gymnasts were perennial conference and national contenders, won six SEC team championships and the 1982 AIAW national team championship, and made eleven consecutive appearances at the NCAA national championship tournament.
G. Robert Woodruff	Football, Athletic Director	1950–59	Bob Woodruff served as the head coach of the Florida Gators football team and the athletic director of the Florida Gators sports program. His football teams won more games in ten years than those of any other coach in the first fifty-four years of Gators football. As athletic director, Woodruff expanded facilities, created a strong base of alumni and booster support, and put the program on a sound financial footing for the first time.
Everett M. Yon	Athletic Director, Administrator	1925–28; 1950–66	Everett Yon played for the Florida Gators football team in 1914 and 1915, and the Gators baseball team in 1915 and 1916. Yon returned to the university as a U.S. Army captain and ROTC instructor, and served as athletic director of the Florida Gators sports program from 1925 to 1928. Yon returned again as a retired army colonel after World War II, and served as the president of Gator Boosters, Inc. until his death in 1966.

== See also ==
- Fergie Ferguson Award
- Florida Gators
- Florida Sports Hall of Fame
- Gator Football Ring of Honor
- History of the University of Florida
- List of Florida Gators baseball players in Major League Baseball
- List of Florida Gators football All-Americans
- List of Florida Gators in the NFL draft
- List of Florida Gators in the NBA
- List of Florida Gators men's golfers on the PGA Tour
- List of Florida Gators in the WNBA
- List of Florida Gators women's golfers on the LPGA Tour
- List of Florida Gators tennis players
- List of University of Florida alumni
- List of University of Florida Olympians
- University Athletic Association

== Bibliography ==
- Florida Baseball 2014 Media Supplement, University Athletic Association, Gainesville, Florida (2014).
- Florida Football 2014 Media Guide, University Athletic Association, Gainesville, Florida (2014).
- Florida Gymnastics 2014 Media Supplement, University Athletic Association, Gainesville, Florida (2014).
- Florida Men's Basketball 2013–14 Media Guide, University Athletic Association, Gainesville, Florida (2013).
- Florida Men's Golf 2013–14 Media Supplement, University Athletic Association, Gainesville, Florida (2013).
- Florida Men's Tennis 2013–14 Media Supplement, University Athletic Association, Gainesville, Florida (2013).
- Florida Soccer 2014 Media Supplement, University Athletic Association, Gainesville, Florida (2014).
- Florida Softball 2014 Media Supplement, University Athletic Association, Gainesville, Florida (2014).
- Florida Swimming & Diving 2013–14 Media Supplement, University Athletic Association, Gainesville, Florida (2013).
- Florida Volleyball 2013 Media Supplement, University Athletic Association, Gainesville, Florida (2013).
- Florida Women's Basketball 2013–14 Media Supplement, University Athletic Association, Gainesville, Florida (2013).
- Florida Women's Golf 2013–14 Media Supplement, University Athletic Association, Gainesville, Florida (2013).
- Florida Women's Tennis 2013–14 Media Supplement, University Athletic Association, Gainesville, Florida (2013).
- McEwen, Tom, The Gators: A Story of Florida Football, The Strode Publishers, Huntsville, Alabama (1974). ISBN 0-87397-025-X.
