= Dennis K. Stanley =

American football coach and university dean (1906–1983)

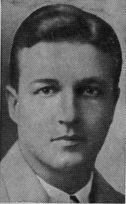
- Young Dutch Stanley

Biographical details
- Born: April 14, 1906; Aylesbury, England
- Died: May 29, 1983 (aged 77); Gainesville, Florida, U.S.

Playing career

Football
- 1926–1928: Florida
- Position: End

Coaching career (HC unless noted)

Football
- 1929: Daytona Beach HS (FL)
- 1930: Andrew Jackson HS (FL)
- 1931–1932: Florida (assistant)
- 1933–1935: Florida
- 1936–1938: Florida (ends)
- 1939–1946: Duke (ends)

Tennis
- 1932–1940: Florida

Track and field
- 1934–1936: Florida

Head coaching record
- Overall: 14–13–2 (college football); 54–12 (college tennis)

Accomplishments and honors

Awards
- Honorable mention All-Southern (1928); University of Florida Athletic Hall of Fame

Dennis Keith Stanley Sr. (April 14, 1906 – May 29, 1983), nicknamed Dutch Stanley, was an American education professor, university administrator and intercollegiate sports coach. Stanley was a native of England, but graduated from high school in Florida. He was a standout college football player for the University of Florida football teams of the late 1920s, and later returned to his alma mater as a professor and coach, and ultimately as the long-time dean of the College of Health and Human Performance.

== Early life and education ==
Dennis Stanley was born in Aylesbury, Buckinghamshire, England on Easter Sunday 1906, the youngest of seven children. The Stanley family emigrated to Canada when he was a child, first to Winnipeg, Manitoba, then to Fort William, Ontario. When he was 12 years old, the family moved to Umatilla and then Ocala, Florida. He attended Hillsborough High School in Tampa, Florida, where he was an all-state end and team captain of the Hillsborough Terriers high school football and basketball teams. The 1923 football team piloted by Speedy Walker was the runner-up for the state title, losing to Lakeland High School and Goof Bowyer. His mother died when he was 17, but he worked nights at The Tampa Tribune office, and managed to graduate from high school in 1924. With the help of a civil engineer, Henry Freeman, for whom he had been working on a surveying crew, Stanley scraped together enough money to go to the University of Florida, where Freeman was an alumnus.

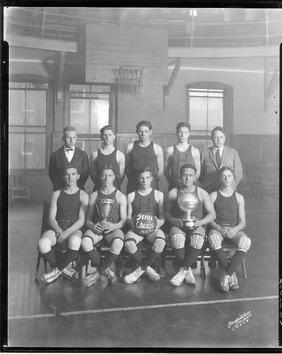
1923-24 Hillsborough High basketball team. Stanley is seated second from left, holding the cup.

Stanley attended the University of Florida in Gainesville, Florida from 1924 to 1929, where he was a member of the Sigma Alpha Epsilon fraternity (Florida Upsilon chapter). Stanley played for the memorable Florida Gators football teams of 1926, 1927 and 1928 under two of the Gators' early football legends, coaches Harold Sebring and Charlie Bachman, and was a senior on Bachman's 8–1 team of 1928. He was a standout end for the Gators, and played on the opposite side of the line from All-American end Dale Van Sickel. Stanley was also a javelin and discus thrower on the Gators track and field team. After graduating from the university with his bachelor's degree in 1929, Stanley earned a master's degree in physical education at Pennsylvania State College in State College, Pennsylvania.

== Academic and coaching career ==
Stanley taught and coached in Daytona Beach and Jacksonville, Florida public high schools for two years before returning to the University of Florida. (Note: His 1929 Daytona Beach Buccaneers went 7–3.) In 1931, Van Sickel left for Hollywood and Stanley returned as an instructor and assistant football coach under Bachman. Stanley supplemented his income during the Great Depression by laying bricks.

=== Florida ===
After a downturn in the win–loss records of Bachman's teams in 1931 and 1932, Bachman resigned and Stanley became the Gators' new head coach at the age of 26, selected over the older Nash Higgins. (Note: Higgins left to start the football program at the University of Tampa.) Stanley led an all-Florida-alumni coaching staff from 1933 to 1935, (Note: Including Rainey Cawthon, Ben Clemons, Carlos Proctor, Goof Bowyer, and Pat Pattilo.) and his three-year turn as the Gators' man-in-charge represented a brief resurgence for Florida football. During the first three years of the new Southeastern Conference (SEC), Stanley posted a 14–13–2 record, including notable victories over the new SEC rival Auburn Tigers, Georgia Tech Yellow Jackets and Sewanee Tigers, as well as the out-of-conference Maryland Terrapins, North Carolina Tar Heels, NC State Wolfpack and South Carolina Gamecocks.

After a 3–7 record in 1935, however, Stanley submitted his resignation at the end of the season in the face of alumni discontent, but, in an unusual move, remained a member of the coaching staff when the new head coach, Josh Cody, took over in 1936. The Gators would not have another winning football season until 1952.

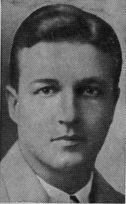
Stanley c. 1933

Stanley also served as the first head coach of the Florida Gators men's tennis team from 1932 to 1940, compiling a 54–12 record, as well as the head coach for the Florida Gators track and field team from 1934 to 1936. As measured by his winning percentage (.818), Stanley remains the winningest tennis coach in Gators history.

=== Duke ===
Stanley continued to serve as an assistant football coach under his successor until 1939, when Stanley left the Florida football program to be an assistant coach under Wallace Wade at Duke University in Durham, North Carolina, succeeding another "Dutch"–Carl Voyles as end coach of the "Iron Dukes". Stanley was a part of Wade's successful Blue Devils football teams in 1940 and 1941, including the squad that played in the 1942 Rose Bowl. Wade's coaching staff also included Herschel Caldwell and Ellis Hagler. When World War II broke up Wade's tenure, Stanley continued to serve as an assistant under Eddie Cameron. The 1944 team beat Alabama in the Sugar Bowl.

=== Return to Florida ===
In 1946, a member of the Florida Board of Control requested that Stanley prepare a plan for the University of Florida's athletic program and a new college of physical education., The plan was approved, and, having been instrumental in advocating the consolidation of the new inter-disciplinary academic program and designing its curriculum, he was appointed as the dean of the new college. The College of Physical Education, Health and Recreation, the nation's first college of its kind, evolved to become the College of Health and Human Performance, and Stanley remained its dean from 1946 to 1970. During the mid-1950s, Stanley developed a smaller court version of tennis for older players which received national attention.

==== Legacy ====
After announcing his resignation as dean in January 1969, he continued to teach in the college until he retired in 1976. The college founded the D.K. Stanley Lecture series in 1986, to recognize Stanley's "many contributions to the professions of physical education, health education and recreation."

Stanley was also a well-known author in his field; his publications included the standard textbook Physical Education Activities Handbook for Men and Women. He was a member of Florida Blue Key and was recognized as a Distinguished Letter Winner in the University of Florida Athletic Hall of Fame. Showing his lifelong love of football, Stanley served as the NCAA representative on the Gator Bowl organizing committee for twenty-eight years.

Stanley died in Gainesville on May 29, 1983; he was 77 years old. He was survived by his wife, June Cowperthwaite Stanley, two children and three stepchildren.

== Head coaching record ==
=== College football ===
Year	Team	Overall	Conference	Standing	Bowl/playoffs
Florida Gators (Southeastern Conference) (1933–1935)
1933	Florida	5–3–1	2–3	T–9th	
1934	Florida	6–3–1	2–2–1	7th	
1935	Florida	3–7	1–6	12th	
Florida:		14–13–2	5–11–1		
Total:		14–13–2			

== See also ==
- List of Sigma Alpha Epsilon members
- List of University of Florida alumni
- List of University of Florida faculty and administrators

== Bibliography ==
- Golenbock, Peter (2002). Go Gators!: An Oral History of Florida's Pursuit of Gridiron Glory. Legends Pub. ISBN 978-0-9650782-1-4.
- McEwen, Tom (1974). The Gators: A Story of Florida Football. Strode Publishers. ISBN 978-0-87397-025-9.
- Stanley, Dennis, Irving F. Waglow & Ruth H. Alexander, Physical Education Activities Handbook for Men and Women, Allyn & Bacon, Inc. (3rd ed. 1973). ISBN 0-205-03640-6.
- Stanley, Dennis Keith (Dutch) (July 25, 1974). "Interview with Dennis Keith (Dutch) Stanley, July 25, 1974" (Interview). Interviewed by Johnson, Bob. Gainesville, Florida: University of Florida Oral History Project, George A. Smathers Libraries, Digital Collections.
