= Royce Goodbread =

American football player (1907–1991)

No. 42
- Positions: Halfback, wingback, fullback

Personal information
- Born: August 23, 1907; Crystal River, Florida, U.S.
- Died: May 19, 1991 (aged 83); Dallas, Texas, U.S.
- Listed height: 5 ft 11 in (1.80 m)
- Listed weight: 207 lb (94 kg)

Career information
- High school: St. Petersburg (St. Petersburg, Florida)
- College: Florida

Career history
- Frankford Yellow Jackets (1930); Minneapolis Red Jackets (1930); Providence Steam Roller (1931)

Career NFL statistics
- Games played: 18
- Games started: 14
- Stats at Pro Football Reference

Royce Ethelbert Goodbread (August 23, 1907 – May 19, 1991) was an American college and professional football player who was a halfback and wingback in the National Football League (NFL) for two seasons during the early 1930s. Goodbread played college football for the University of Florida, and thereafter, he played professionally for the Frankford Yellow Jackets, the Minneapolis Red Jackets and the Providence Steam Roller of the NFL.

== Early life ==
Goodbread was born in Crystal River, Florida in 1907, and attended St. Petersburg High School in St. Petersburg, Florida, and he played for the St. Petersburg Green Devils high school football team. In 1925 he accounted for 189 points, and led his team to a win over rival Hillsborough High School.

== College career ==
After graduating from high school, Goodbread attended the University of Florida in Gainesville, Florida, where he played for coach Tom Sebring and coach Charlie Bachman's Florida Gators football teams from 1927 to 1929. In Goodbread's three seasons as a member of the Gators varsity, the team posted win–loss records of 7–3, 8–1 and 8–2—a three-year peak for the Gators which they would not equal or exceed for over six decades. Goodbread was a key member of the Gators' "Phantom Four" offensive backfield that included Carl Brumbaugh, Rainey Cawthon and Clyde Crabtree, when the 1928 Gators led the country with 336 points scored and finished 8–1, losing only to the Tennessee Volunteers in Knoxville by a single point, 13–12.

Goodbread graduated from the University of Florida with a bachelor's degree in physical education in 1930.

== Professional career ==
During the 1930 NFL season, Goodbread played in thirteen games for the Frankford Yellow Jackets and one game for the Minneapolis Red Jackets, and starting in a total of ten of them. In the following 1931 season, he played in four games for the Providence Steam Roller and started in two of them.

Goodbread was an insurance agent in Dallas, Texas. He died on May 19, 1991; he was 83 years old.

== See also ==
- Florida Gators football, 1920–29
- List of University of Florida alumni
