= Clyde Crabtree =

American football player, teacher, coach

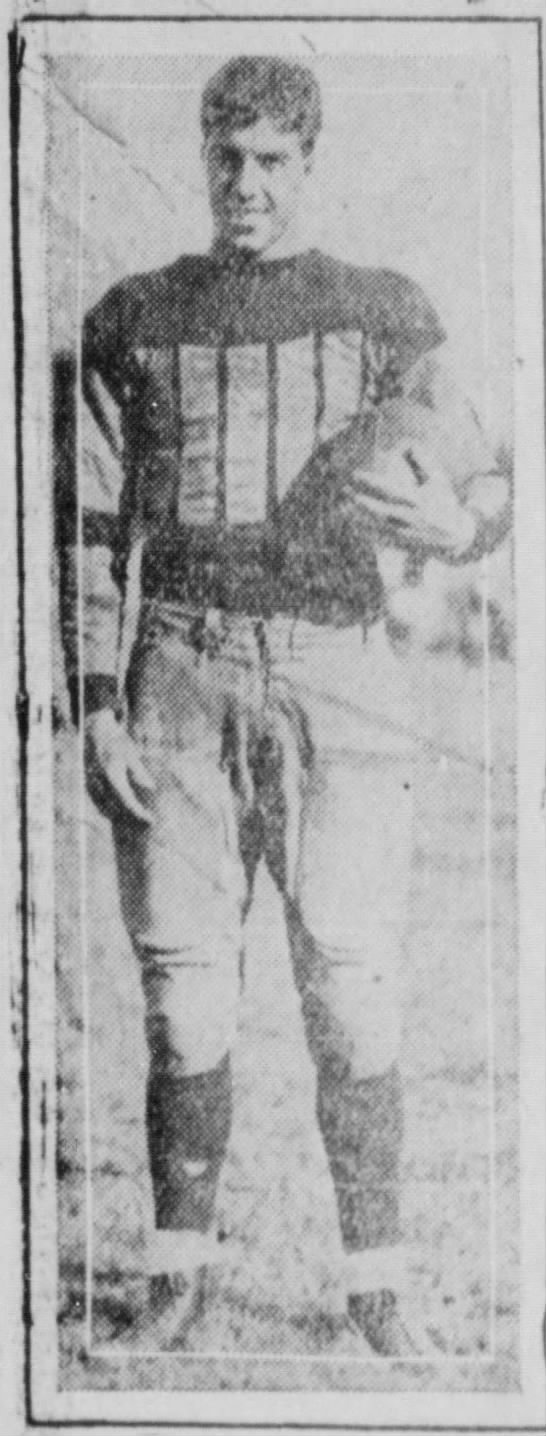
- Crabtree in Gators uniform, circa 1928.

No. 17
- Positions: Halfback, quarterback

Personal information
- Born: November 3, 1905; Altoona, Iowa, U.S.
- Died: April 21, 1994 (aged 88); South Miami, Florida, U.S.
- Listed height: 5 ft 8 in (1.73 m)
- Listed weight: 160 lb (73 kg)

Career information
- High school: J. Sterling Morton East (Cicero, Illinois)
- College: Florida

Career history
- Frankford Yellow Jackets (1930); Minneapolis Red Jackets (1930)

Awards and highlights
- Third-team All-American (1928); First-team All-Southern (1928); University of Florida Athletic Hall of Fame

Career NFL statistics
- Games played: 15
- Games started: 7
- Stats at Pro Football Reference

Clyde Crabtree (November 3, 1905 – April 21, 1994), nicknamed "Cannonball Crabtree," was an American college and professional football player who was a halfback and quarterback in the National Football League (NFL) for a single season in 1930. Crabtree played college football for the University of Florida, and thereafter, he played professionally for the Frankford Yellow Jackets and Minneapolis Red Jackets of the NFL.

== Early life ==
Crabtree was born in Altoona, Iowa in 1905. He attended J. Sterling Morton High School in Cicero, Illinois, and played for the Morton Mustangs high school football team even though he was relatively short and slight of build.

== College career ==
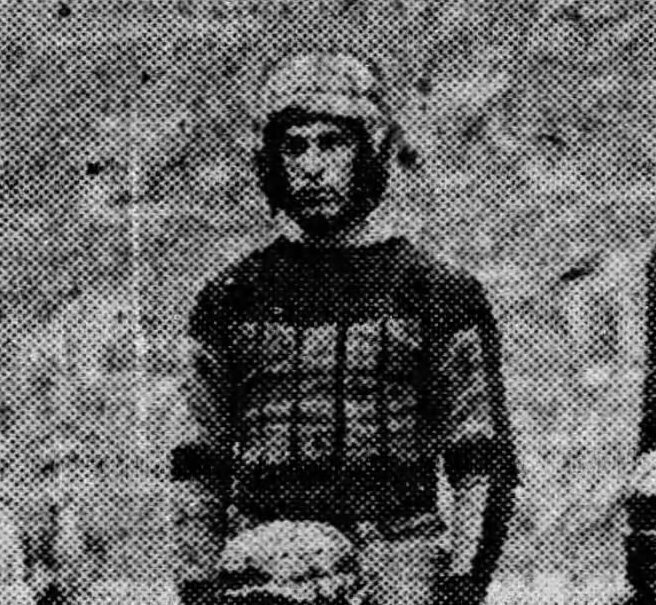
Crabtree in his Florida football uniform during the 1929 football season

Crabtree first attended Northwestern University in Evanston, Illinois, but dropped out after deciding that he did not like the social atmosphere of Northwestern. After his mother and stepfather moved to Florida, his parents convinced him to enroll in the University of Florida in Gainesville, Florida, where he played for coach Tom Sebring and coach Charlie Bachman's Florida Gators football teams from 1927 to 1929. He had the ambidextrous ability to punt or dropkick the ball off either foot while on the run, or throw a forward pass with either arm.

As a collegian, Crabtree was a key backfield contributor for three Gators squads in 1927, 1928 and 1929 which finished 7–3, 8–1 and 8–2, respectively. All three squads ranked among the very best teams produced by the University of Florida through that time, including the great Gator eleven of 1928 whose achievements remained unsurpassed by future Gators football teams through the 1960s, and arguably, through the early 1990s. In 1928, Crabtree was fortunate to have two of the best offensive ends in the country as his primary passing targets, Dutch Stanley and All-American Dale Van Sickel, and was supported by the other three talented and speedy backs of the Gators' "Phantom Four" offensive backfield—Carl Brumbaugh, Rainey Cawthon and Royce Goodbread. By the second week, in less than three quarters of play, Crabtree had directed 8 touchdowns. In an era before national polling, the 1928 Gators attracted national newspaper coverage as they outscored their opponents 336–44, leading the nation in scoring during the 1928 season; they finished 8–1, losing their final game to coach Robert Neyland's Tennessee Volunteers in Knoxville by a single point, 13–12. In that game, Buddy Hackman intercepted a lateral from Crabtree to Brumbaugh, who was in the clear had it been executed correctly.

As a junior in 1928, Crabtree was first-team All-Southern selection by the Associated Press, and received third-team All-American honors from the Associated Press, the Newspaper Enterprise Association and United Press. Crabtree's final football game saw a major intersectional victory over the Oregon Webfoots in Miami. He returned a punt 80 yards for a score. Crabtree was also a star forward for the Florida Gators basketball team in 1928 and 1929, and was later inducted into the University of Florida Athletic Hall of Fame as a "Gator Great" in 1976. As part of an article series written for The Gainesville Sun in 2006, the Sun sportswriters chose him as No. 23 among the 100 all-time greatest Gators from the first 100 years of Florida football.

== Professional career ==
Crabtree played professional football for a single season in 1930, playing for the now-defunct Frankford Yellow Jackets and Minneapolis Red Jackets of the NFL. He played in fifteen games, started in seven of them, and was responsible for scoring two touchdowns.

== Life after football ==
Crabtree returned to the University of Florida after his NFL career was over, and graduated with a bachelor's degree in education in 1934. He also earned a master's degree in education in 1951. Crabtree served as a high school sports coach in several of the high schools of Palm Beach County and Dade County, Florida, and later, as a school administrator.

He died of complications from diabetes in 1994; he was 88 years old.

== See also ==
- List of Florida Gators football All-Americans
- List of Florida Gators in the NFL draft
- List of University of Florida alumni
