= 1928 Florida Gators football team =

American college football season

1928 Florida Gators football
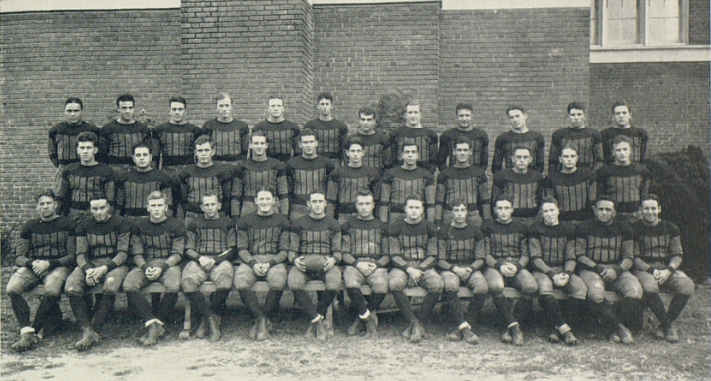
- Conference: Southern Conference
- Record: 8–1 (6–1 SoCon)
- Head coach: Charlie Bachman (1st season)
- Offensive scheme: Notre Dame Box
- Captain: Goof Bowyer
- Home stadium: Fleming Field

Uniform
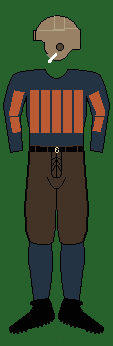

1928 Southern Conference football standings
	Conf.					Overall
Team	W		L		T	W		L		T
No. 3 Georgia Tech $	7	–	0	–	0	10	–	0	–	0
Tennessee	6	–	0	–	1	9	–	0	–	1
Florida	6	–	1	–	0	8	–	1	–	0
VPI	4	–	1	–	0	7	–	2	–	0
Alabama	6	–	2	–	0	6	–	3	–	0
LSU	3	–	1	–	1	6	–	2	–	1
Clemson	4	–	2	–	0	8	–	3	–	0
Vanderbilt	4	–	2	–	0	8	–	2	–	0
Tulane	3	–	3	–	1	6	–	3	–	1
Ole Miss	3	–	3	–	0	5	–	4	–	0
North Carolina	2	–	2	–	2	5	–	3	–	2
Kentucky	2	–	2	–	1	4	–	3	–	1
South Carolina	2	–	2	–	1	6	–	2	–	2
Maryland	2	–	3	–	1	6	–	3	–	1
VMI	2	–	3	–	1	5	–	3	–	2
Georgia	2	–	4	–	0	4	–	5	–	0
NC State	1	–	3	–	1	4	–	5	–	1
Mississippi A&M	1	–	4	–	0	2	–	4	–	2
Virginia	1	–	6	–	0	2	–	6	–	1
Washington and Lee	1	–	6	–	0	2	–	8	–	0
Sewanee	0	–	5	–	0	2	–	7	–	0
Auburn	0	–	7	–	0	1	–	8	–	0
$ – Conference champion; Rankings from Dickinson System

The 1928 Florida Gators football team represented the University of Florida in the sport of American football during the 1928 Southern Conference football season. The season was future Hall-of-Famer Charlie Bachman's first of five as the team's head coach. The Gators finished 8–1 overall, and 6–1 in the Southern Conference (SoCon), placing third of twenty-three teams in the conference, behind the national champion Georgia Tech Golden Tornado (7–0 SoCon), and the Tennessee Volunteers (6–0–1 SoCon).

The Gators led the nation in scoring with 336 points, and were remembered by many sports commentators as the best Florida football team until at least the 1960s. The large scores were mostly due to its "Phantom Four" backfield which included: quarterback Clyde Crabtree, halfbacks Carl Brumbaugh and Royce Goodbread, and fullback Rainey Cawthon. Other backs who were key contributors included: captain Goof Bowyer, sophomore halfback Lee Roy "Red" Bethea, alternate-captain and halfback Tommy Owens, and fullback Ed Sauls. One account reads: "There were twelve backs on the squad. Six of them can do the hundred in 10.1 seconds. Eight of them are fine punters and ten of them are great passers. And all of them are good receivers."

At ends were future coach Dutch Stanley, and Florida's first-ever, first-team All-American, Dale Van Sickel. Van Sickel and quarterback Crabtree, who was ambidextrous and could throw passes with either hand, or punt with either foot, while on the run or stationary, were both unanimous All-Southern selections.

Among the many football highlights of 1928 were the Gators' 26–6 victory over the Georgia Bulldogs, which ended a six-game losing streak versus the Bulldogs, and the controversial loss to Tennessee ending their bid at an undefeated season and possible Rose Bowl berth.

== Before the season ==
Head coach Charlie Bachman succeeded Tom Sebring, his former player at Kansas State. Bachman had attended Notre Dame and used Knute Rockne's system. Sebring graduated from the University of Florida's College of Law, (Note: He later became a circuit court judge and chief justice of the Florida Supreme Court.) and left Bachman several recruits.

Players not returning from the previous season included: Horse Bishop, Cecil Beck, Speedy Walker, Tom Fuller, Charlie Tucker, and Bill Middlekauff. Practice was opened on September 3. A wealth of talented players from Florida high schools was expected. After spending just two weeks with the team, while many players were engaged in other sports, Bachman declared his backfield material as the finest he ever had.

John J. Tigert became UF president in 1928, and began a drive to construct a new and larger stadium upon his arrival.

== Schedule ==
Date	Opponent	Site	Result	Attendance	Source
October 6	Southern College*	Fleming Field; Gainesville, FL	W 26–0	4,000	
October 13	Auburn	Fleming Field; Gainesville, FL (rivalry)	W 27–0	6,000	
October 20	Mercer*^{†}	Fleming Field; Gainesville, FL	W 73–0	8,000	
October 27	vs. NC State	Fairfield Stadium; Jacksonville, FL	W 14–7	13,000	
November 3	vs. Sewanee	Fairfield Stadium; Jacksonville, FL	W 71–6	6,500	
November 10	vs. Georgia	Municipal Stadium; Savannah, GA (rivalry)	W 26–6	16,000	
November 17	vs. Clemson	Fairfield Stadium; Jacksonville, FL	W 27–6	15,000	
November 29	vs. Washington & Lee	Fairfield Stadium; Jacksonville, FL	W 60–6	14,000	
December 8	at Tennessee	Shields–Watkins Field; Knoxville, TN (rivalry)	L 12–13	13,000	
*Non-conference game; ^{†}Homecoming

.

== Game summaries ==
=== Week 1: Southern College ===
Week 1: Southern College at Florida

Team	1	2	3	4	Total
Southern	0	0	0	0	0
• Florida	0	0	26	0	26

- Date: October 6
- Location: Fleming Field
  Gainesville, Florida
- Game attendance: 4,000
- Referee: Ted Arnold

In the first game of the 1928 season, the Gators posted a 26–0 victory over Southern College, whose quarterback weighed just 98 pounds (44 kg). The Gators were held scoreless in the first half of the game, and achieved only two first downs; but then scored 26 points in the third quarter.

The starting lineup was: W. DeHoff (left end), Norfleet (left tackle), Grandoff (left guard), Clemons (center), Perry (right guard), Hicks (right tackle), Green (right end), Bowyer (quarterback), Bethea (left halfback), Owens (right halfback), and Sauls (fullback).

=== Week 2: Auburn ===
Week 2: Auburn at Florida

Team	1	2	3	4	Total
Auburn	0	0	0	0	0
• Florida	0	27	0	0	27

- Date: October 13
- Location: Fleming Field
  Gainesville, Florida
- Game attendance: 6,000
- Game weather: Rain

In the second week of play, the Gators easily defeated the Auburn Tigers 27–0. Carl Brumbaugh ran for three touchdowns in a single quarter, including one scoring run of 85 yards. The other touchdown occurred near the start of the second quarter, when Royce Goodbread carried a pass from Clyde Crabtree 16 yards to the goal. Dutch Stanley kicked the extra point.

In less than three quarters of play, Crabtree had directed 8 touchdowns. Crabtree was an ambidextrous triple threat, able to pass with either arm and punt with either foot, and both while on the run. Crabtree said he learned this technique "from sheer fright." Assistant Nash Higgins added "he played by instinct." "He was a double-quadruple option." said coach Bachman.

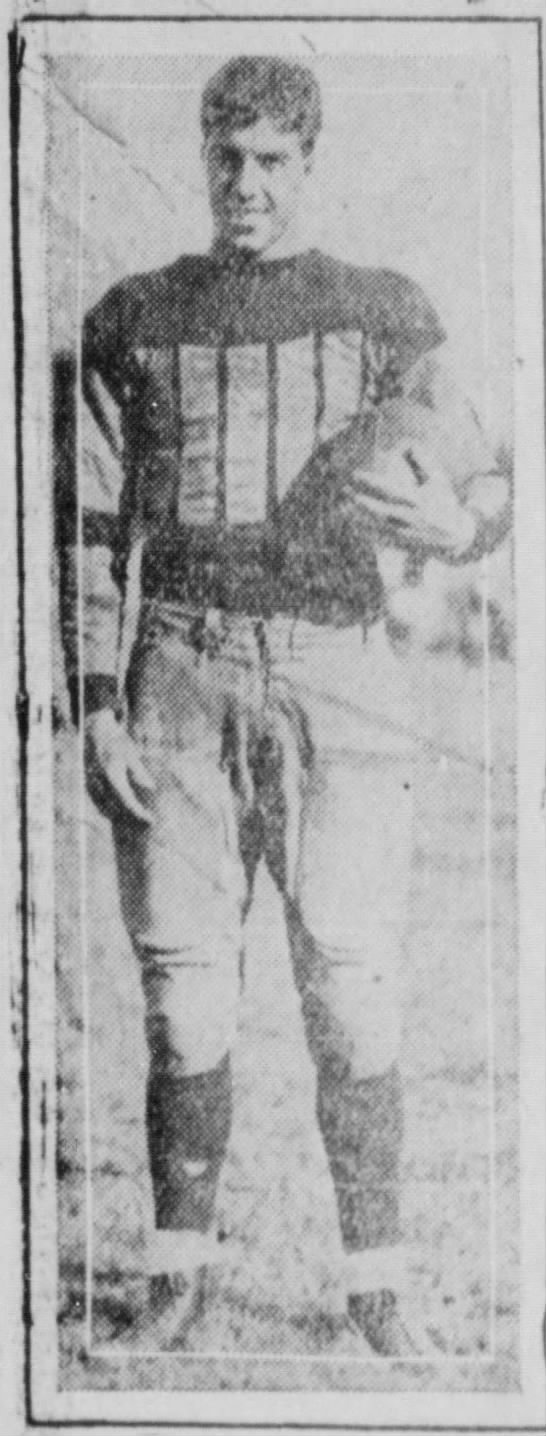
"Cannonball" Clyde Crabtree (pictured) could throw with either hand and punt with either foot.

It began to rain as the third quarter started, and the Gators' substitutes were on the field. This hampered play and prevented a larger score. The rain sent the 6,000 spectators seeking shelter.

The starting lineup was: Green (left end), Norfleet (left tackle), McRae (left guard), Clemons (center), Houser (right guard), Hicks (right tackle), Nolan (right end), Bowyer (quarterback), Bethea (left halfback), Van Sickel (right halfback), and Brumbaugh (fullback).

=== Week 3: Mercer ===
Week 3: Mercer at Florida

Team	1	2	3	4	Total
Mercer	0	0	0	0	0
• Florida	14	28	19	12	73

- Date: October 20
- Location: Fleming Field
  Gainesville, Florida
- Game attendance: 8,000
- Referee: Arthur R. Hutchins

During Florida's homecoming celebrations, the Gators played coach Bernie Moore's Mercer Bears, winning 73–0, and setting a scoring mark that remains the fifth-highest single-game scoring total in team history. Tommy Owens scored four touchdowns, tying a school record; Brumbaugh scored three touchdowns; and Bowyer, Sauls, McEwan, and Stanley had one each. The Mercer Cluster wrote: "The student body is laughing at the football team." This was the last time Florida played Mercer.

The starting lineup was: Green (left end), Norfleet (left tackle), Grandoff (left guard), Bono (center), Houser (right guard), Hicks (right tackle), Nolan (right end), Bowyer (quarterback), McEwen (left halfback), Owens (right halfback), and Sauls (fullback).

=== Week 4: North Carolina State ===
Week 4: North Carolina State at Florida

Team	1	2	3	4	Total
NC State	0	0	0	7	7
• Florida	0	6	6	2	14

- Date: October 27
- Location: Fairfield Stadium
  Jacksonville, Florida
- Game attendance: 13,000
- Referee: Arthur R. Hutchins

Because of the hot autumn weather in Gainesville, the Gators had begun practicing at night. In a closely contested game, the Gators defeated coach Gus Tebell's North Carolina State Wolfpack 14–7 in Jacksonville, Florida, in front of an audience of 13,000.

Both of Florida's touchdowns were scored by Royce Goodbread on 70-yard runs. One of those was around left end, and the other was a punt return. Dutch Stanley missed both extra points after the Gators' two touchdowns, but Rainey Cawthon made up for it when he netted a safety. The Wolfpack scored on the return of a punt blocked off the toe of Gators team captain Goof Bowyer. Just before the game ended, the Wolfpack missed on a long pass to a receiver with a clear field to the goal.

The starting lineup was: Green (left end), Waters (left tackle), McRae (left guard), Bono (center), Houser (right guard), Allen (right tackle), Nolan (right end), Bowyer (quarterback), McEwen (left halfback), Owens (right halfback), and Sauls (fullback).

=== Week 5: Sewanee ===
Week 5: Sewanee at Florida

Team	1	2	3	4	Total
Sewanee	0	6	0	0	6
• Florida	6	25	27	13	71

- Date: November 3
- Location: Fairfield Stadium
  Jacksonville, Florida
- Referee: Walter Powell (Wisconsin)

In the fifth week, Florida crushed the mismatched Sewanee Tigers 71–6 in Jacksonville despite Sewanee's highly publicized aerial attack. (Note: Florida had not played Sewanee since 1915.) Clyde Crabtree and Tommy Owens had to sit out with injuries. Goof Bowyer, Red Bethea, and Broward McClellan were seen as the stars of the game. The Gators played substitutes throughout the second half, putting the first stringers back in by the middle of the fourth quarter. Florida's center, Frank Clark, also drew praise for his play on the line. This score placed the Gators in first place for scoring within the Southern Conference, and still remains one of the seven highest single-game scoring totals in Gators team history.

The scoring started in the first period after some three minutes when Red Bethea caught a 25-yard pass from Goof Bowyer and ran the additional 10 yards for a touchdown. Bethea also had a 14-yard touchdown run in the second period, and a 58-yard touchdown run in the third. Royce Goodbread had two touchdowns, on end runs around the Sewanee line of 15 and 25 yards. Ed Sauls also had two touchdowns, including the second-half kickoff return for 75 yards and a score. Bowyer, Cawthon, Clark, and McClellan all had one touchdown each. Bowyer netted four extra points, and the Gators had another conversion due to a Sewanee penalty.

The starting lineup was: Green (left end), Waters (left tackle), Grandoff (left guard), Clark (center), Houser (right guard), Hicks (right tackle), Nolan (right end), Bowyer (quarterback), Bethea (left halfback), Yancey (right halfback), and Sauls (fullback).

=== Week 6: at Georgia ===
Week 6: Florida at Georgia

Team	1	2	3	4	Total
• Florida	6	7	7	6	26
Georgia	0	6	0	0	6

- Date: November 10
- Location: Municipal Stadium
  Savannah, Georgia
- Game attendance: 16,000
- Referee: Arthur R. Hutchins

Before the 1928 Florida–Georgia game, Georgia fans trumpeted the return of center Ike Boland to bolster its defense. Florida's defense, however, rendered the Georgia Bulldogs' running game, including that of fullback Herdis McCrary, ineffective en route to a 26–6 victory. This was Florida's first victory over Georgia in seven match-ups and solidified the Gators as legitimate contenders for their first-ever conference title. Two Bulldogs' fumbles, and two Gators pass plays, accounted for Florida's four touchdowns.

The first score came after Rip Reeves recovered a Georgia fumble at the 30-yard line. On the second play after this, Red Bethea ran off left tackle for a touchdown. Goof Bowyer missed the extra point. By the second quarter Georgia had failed to consistently move the ball on the ground against Florida's line and tried to pass. Bulldogs' quarterback H. F. Johnson completed a 10-yard pass to back Frank Dudley, who ran 30 additional yards for a touchdown. Johnson missed the extra point and the score was tied. A 16-yard touchdown run by Florida's Clyde Crabtree, starting around right end, then reversing field, broke the tie. Carl Brumbaugh converted the extra point.

A touchdown pass reception by end Dale Van Sickel of more than 30 yards provided another score in the third period, followed by Brumbaugh's extra point kick. To close the third quarter, fullback Rainey Cawthon made a 40-yard broken field run. On the first play of the fourth quarter, Crabtree passed to Brumbaugh for another score, but Brumbaugh's extra point attempt was blocked by the Bulldogs. In the middle of the fourth quarter, Gator fans rushed the field to tear down the goal posts, and fist fights broke out between Georgia and Florida fans.

The starting lineup was: Van Sickel (left end), J. Clemons (left tackle), Steele (left guard), Clark (center), Reeves (right guard), Bryan (right tackle), Stanley (right end), Bowyer (quarterback), Goodbread (left halfback), Bethea (right halfback), and Sauls (fullback).

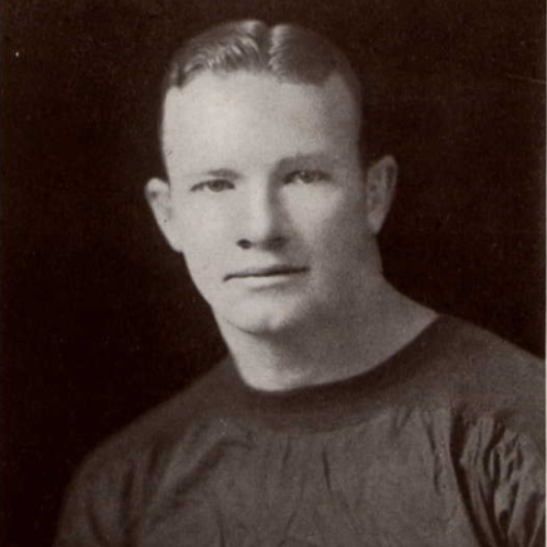
Red Bethea (pictured in 1930).

=== Week 7: Clemson ===
Week 7: Clemson at Florida

Team	1	2	3	4	Total
Clemson	6	0	0	0	6
• Florida	0	7	6	14	27

- Date: November 17
- Location: Fairfield Stadium
  Jacksonville, Florida
- Game attendance: 15,000
- Referee: Severance (Oberlin)

Coach Josh Cody's Clemson Tigers, captained by O. K. Pressley, held extra practices to prepare for the undefeated Gators.

Clemson scored first on a 30-yard pass, leading 6–0 after the first quarter. From then on the Gators dominated, winning 27 to 6. Brumbaugh, Van Sickel, and Bethea were cited as players of the game. In the second quarter, Florida's Owens went around end and Brumbaugh finished the drive with a touchdown.

Florida used both the run and the pass effectively, as Bethea "looked for all the world like the famous Red Grange" according to Associated Press (AP) staff writer Benton E. Jacobs. Florida's second touchdown occurred in the second half, when Bethea caught a pass that went 25 yards in the air, and when he gathered it ran 36 yards more for the score. The third score came in the fourth quarter on a pass from Crabtree to Cawthon. The Gators' fourth and final score was on a pass from Brumbaugh to Van Sickel.

The starting lineup was: Green (left end), Waters (left tackle), McRae (left guard), B. Clemons (center), Allen (right guard), Hicks (right tackle), Nolan (right end), Bowyer (quarterback), Bethea (left halfback), Goodbread (right halfback), and Sauls (fullback).

=== Week 8: Washington & Lee ===
Week 8: Washington & Lee at Florida

Team	1	2	3	4	Total
W&L	6	0	0	0	6
• Florida	21	7	26	6	60

- Date: November 29
- Location: Fairfield Stadium
  Jacksonville, Florida
- Game attendance: 14,000
- Referee: Buck Flowers

The 60–6 victory over coach Pat Herron's Washington & Lee Generals made the Gators the highest-scoring team in the entire nation in total points scored. In front of 14,000 fans, Tommy Owens scored two touchdowns, as did Brumbaugh and Goodbread; while Bethea, Crabtree, and McEwan had one each. Morgan Blake wrote: "At this writing, it is a matter for serious debate as to which is the dizziest—the Washington and Lee football team or this groggy sports scribe from Atlanta ... Florida's great football team—magnificent in the fullest sense of the word, keen, alert, fast, and powerful—gave Washington and Lee the most crushing defeat it has encountered in many years." The Gators tallied 590 total yards.

The starting lineup was: Baldwin (left end), Hicks (left tackle), Houser (left guard), Clark (center), Grandoff (right guard), Waters (right tackle), Green (right end), Bowyer (quarterback), Bethea (left halfback), Goodbread (right halfback), and Sauls (fullback).

=== Week 9: at Tennessee ===
Week 9: Florida at Tennessee

Team	1	2	3	4	Total
Florida	0	0	6	6	12
• Tennessee	0	7	0	6	13

- Date: December 8
- Location: Shields–Watkins Field
  Knoxville, Tennessee
- Game attendance: 13,000
- Game weather: Mud
- Referee: Lambert (Ohio State)

The 1928 Gators played their final game against coach Robert Neyland's Tennessee Volunteers on the Vols' home field in Knoxville, Tennessee. Neyland was sick with the flu. The game was played on a soft, wet field, following a hard rain, and both teams scored two touchdowns on the muddy field. The Volunteers missed one of their two extra-point conversion attempts after touchdowns, but the Gators missed two conversion attempts and lost the game by a single point, 12–13. In what would become a trend in the series, controversy swirled around the contest. By all accounts, the playing surface had been a muddy mess. Some Gators claimed that the home team had watered down the field in an effort to slow down the speedy Gator backs. The Vols protested that the sloppy conditions were simply the result of heavy rain the night before the game. One contemporary sportswriter called the game "the biggest upset of the year down South." Tennessee's usual quarterback, Roy Witt, was out with an injury, and was replaced by Bobby Dodd.

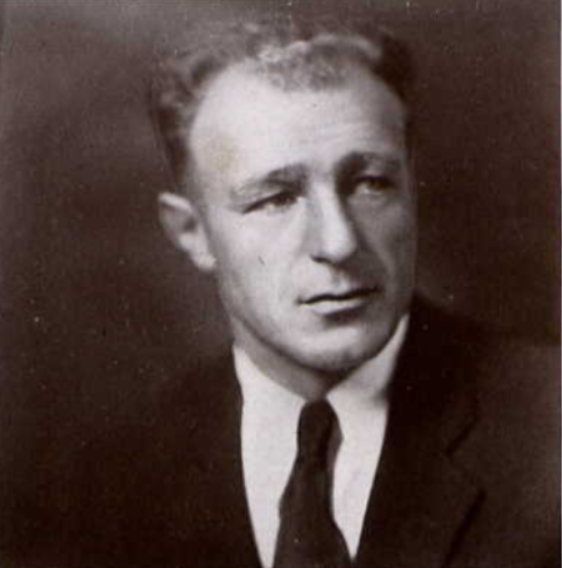
Coach Bachman

Prior to the contest, coach Bachman used a motivational trick learned from Knute Rockne and waved a telegram in front of his players, telling them a win over Tennessee meant an invitation to the Rose Bowl, the only postseason bowl in those days, even though conference champion Georgia Tech was already invited. The loss curtailed Florida's hopes of its first conference title, and fans and players have long since mourned the missed chance at a Rose Bowl. Coach Bachman later added: "We would have beaten California in the Rose Bowl. Worse than Tech did on a dry field."

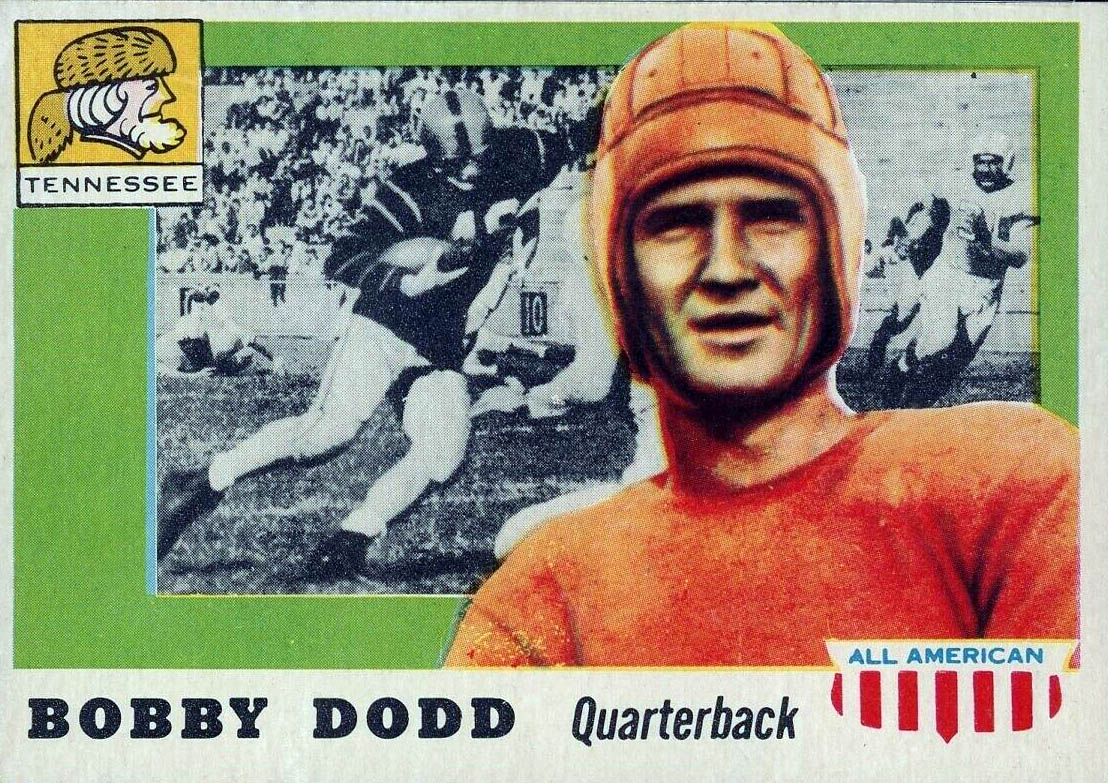
Tennessee quarterback Bobby Dodd depicted on a football card from the 1950s.

Tennessee led the scoring for most of the game; Florida only making it close with late rallies. Early in the second quarter, Tennessee made the half's lone score. It was set up by a "bullet-like" 25-yard pass from Dodd, who was on the run to evade tacklers, to Paul Hug, who was downed at the 2-yard line. After Florida's defense held for three downs, Gene McEver scored between the center's legs on fourth down. The ensuing extra point on a pass from Dodd to Herc Alley would decide the game.

Down 7–0 at the half, the Gators seemed to begin a comeback and scored two minutes into the third quarter. On a similar play to Tennessee's score, a 16-yard pass from Royce Goodbread was caught by Dale Van Sickel, down at the 1-yard line. Goodbread went over left tackle for the touchdown the very next play. Dodd deflected Carl Brumbaugh's pass for the extra point attempt. After the beginning of the fourth quarter, Florida had the ball inside its own 15-yard line after Tennessee turned it over on downs. Clyde Crabtree ran instead of punting, and was tackled just as he tried to execute a lateral to Goodbread near the 30-yard line. The lateral was intercepted by Tennessee's Buddy Hackman, who out-sprinted Brumbaugh to the goal.

The Gators later drove to the 4-yard line before they were held on downs. After Dodd's punt to midfield, the Gators' engineered their final scoring drive. A 27-yard pass from Brumbaugh to Van Sickel got the Gators out of bounds at the 1-yard line. Crabtree ran it in for the touchdown, but Brumbaugh's place kick for the extra point was wide and short. Some sources, such as Peter Golenbock's Go Gators!, claim it was blocked.

The starting lineup was: Van Sickel (left end), Waters (left tackle), Steele (left guard), Clark (center), Reeves (right guard), Hicks (right tackle), Stanley (right end), Bowyer (quarterback), Bethea (left halfback), Owens (right halfback), and Sauls (fullback).

== Postseason ==
=== Awards and honors ===
The Gators scored 336 points, then one of few stats kept, the most of any team in the nation. After the conclusion of the 1928 season, seven Gator players were tabbed for postseason honors by major media outlets: the "Phantom Four" as well as end Dale Van Sickel, and linemen Jimmy Steele and William McRae.

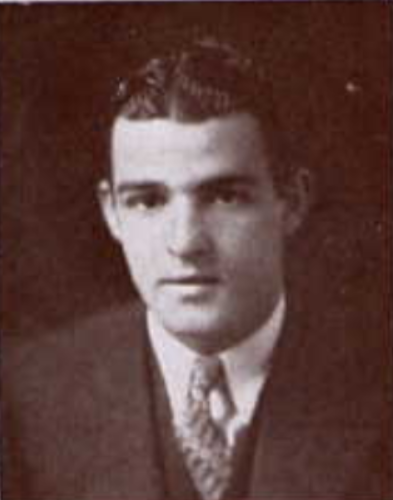
Dale Van Sickel (pictured) was the school's first All-American.

Junior end Van Sickel was chosen a first-team, All-American, the first in Gators' team history, by the AP, Collier's Weekly, and the Newspaper Enterprise Association (NEA). Sophomore guard Steele was a second-team, All-American selection by the NEA, and received honorable mention honors from the AP. Sophomore guard McRae was a second-team, All-American selection by United Press (UP). Junior back Clyde Crabtree received third-team, All-American honors from each of the AP, the NEA, and UP.

Crabtree and Van Sickel were both first-team, All-Southern selections of the AP and UP composite teams. Steele was a first-team, UP, All-Southern selection. Dutch Stanley, Dale Waters, Steele, Carl Brumbaugh, Royce Goodbread, and Rainey Cawthon received All-Southern honorable mention honors from the AP.

=== Departing seniors ===
Seniors graduating included captain Goof Bowyer, Tommy Owens, Dutch Stanley, Jus Clemons, Willie DeHoff, and Chester Allen. All but DeHoff played all three years for the Florida varsity. Despite this, hopes were high for the team and its backs in 1929.

Four 1928 Gators would later play professional football in the National Football League (NFL): halfback/quarterback Carl Brumbaugh, halfback/quarterback Clyde Crabtree, halfback Royce Goodbread, and tackle Dale Waters. Brumbaugh went on to win multiple NFL Championships with the Chicago Bears in 1932 and 1933. (Note: In the Bears' backfield with Brumbaugh were Bronko Nagurski and Red Grange.)

== Personnel ==
=== Depth chart ===
The following chart provides a visual depiction of Florida's lineup during the 1928 season with games started at the position reflected in parentheses. The chart mimics a Notre Dame Box on offense.

LE
Harry Green (5)
Dale Van Sickel (2)
Loyd Baldwin (1)
Willie DeHoff (1)
Lloyd Wilson (0)

LT	LG	C	RG	RT
Muddy Waters (4)	Bert Grandoff (3)	Frank Clark (4)	Mike Houser (4)	Dashwood Hicks (6)
Joe Norfleet (3)	Bill McRae (3)	Ben Clemons (3)	Rip Reeves (2)	Chester Allen (1)
Jus Clemons (1)	Jimmy Steele (2)	Louis Bono (2)	Chester Allen (1)	Joe Bryan (1)
Dashwood Hicks (1)	Mike Houser (1)	Loyd Baldwin (0)	Bert Grandoff (1)	Muddy Waters (1)
	Wayne Ripley (0)		Tom Perry (1)	

RE
Jimmy Nolan (5)
Harry Green (2)
Dutch Stanley (2)
J. W. Chapman (0)

QB
Goof Bowyer (9)
Clyde Crabtree (0)

RHB
Tommy Owens (4)
Royce Goodbread (2)
Red Bethea (1)
Dale Van Sickel (1)
Harvey Yancey (1)
Carl Brumbaugh (0)
Broward McClellan (0)

LHB
Red Bethea (6)
Red McEwen (2)
Royce Goodbread (1)
John Allen (0)
Johnny Bryson (0)

FB
Ed Sauls (8)
Carl Brumbaugh (1)
Rainey Cawthon (0)
Wilbur James (0)
Elmer Ihrig (0)

=== Varsity players ===
==== Line ====
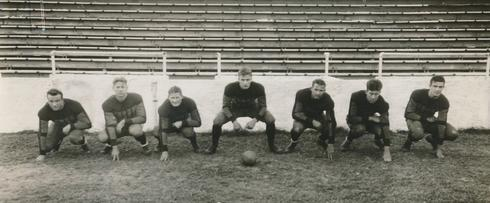
The Gator linemen in formation.

Number	Player	Position	Games started	High school	Height	Weight	Age
3	Chester Allen	tackle	2	Lakeland	6'0"	185	24
20	Louis Bono	center	2	Duval	5'10"	178	23
25	Frank Clark	center	4	Culver	6'1"	170	19
36	Ben Clemons	center	3	Leon	6'2"	185	22
1	Bert Grandoff	guard	4	Hillsborough	5'7"	204	21
12	Harry Green	end	5	Gainesville	6'2"	182	23
33	Dashwood Hicks	tackle	6	Hillsborough	6'2"	176	21
32	Mike Houser	guard	4	Duval	5'7"	170	22
29	Jimmy Nolan	end	5	Duval	5'10"	170	20
4	Joe Norfleet	tackle	3	Newberry	6'0"	175	21
9	Bill McRae	guard	3	West Palm Beach	6'1"	172	19
31	Alex "Rip" Reeves	guard	2	Alabama	5'8"	184	22
21	Dutch Stanley	end	2	Hillsborough	5'8"	181	22
26	Jimmy Steele	guard	2	Hillsborough	6'0"	185	19
39	Dale Van Sickel	end	3	Gainesville	5'11"	170	20
2	Dale "Muddy" Waters	tackle	4	Newcastle	6'2"	185	19

==== Backfield ====
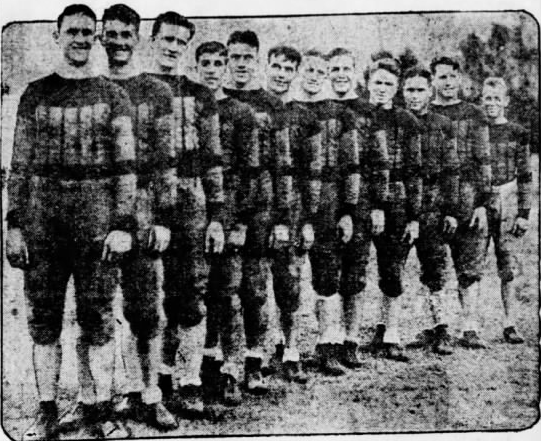
The Gator backfield.

Number	Player	Position	Games started	High school	Height	Weight	Age
23	Red Bethea	halfback	6	Riverside	5'9"	172	21
38	Ernest "Goof" Bowyer	quarterback	9	Lakeland	5'10"	170	24
28	Carl Brumbaugh	halfback	1	West Milton	5'10"	164	21
40	Rainey Cawthon	fullback	0	Leon	5'11"	180	20
17	Clyde "Cannonball" Crabtree	quarterback	0	J. Sterling Morton	5'8"	147	21
42	Royce Goodbread	halfback	2	St. Petersburg	6'0"	190	20
14	Tommy Owens	halfback	4	Quincy	5'11"	146	22
30	Ed Sauls	fullback	8	Leon	5'11"	185	20

=== Varsity substitutes ===
==== Line ====
Number	Player	Position	Games started	High school	Height	Weight	Age
27	Loyd Baldwin	center	1	Miami	5'11"	180	20
10	Joe Bryan	tackle	1	Duval	5'11"	182	23
	J. W. Chapman	end					
15	Justin "Jus" Clemons	tackle	1	Plant City	6'0"	184	22
13	Willie DeHoff	end	1	Spring Hill	6'0"	170	22
24	Tom Perry	guard	1	Daytona Beach	5'10"	160	19
8	Wayne Ripley	guard		Duval	5'11"	190	22
37	Lloyd Wilson	end		Hillsborough	5'10"	165	20

==== Backfield ====
Number	Player	Position	Games started	High school	Height	Weight	Age
	John Allen	halfback					
16	Johnny Bryson	halfback		Duval	5'6"	145	21
19	Elmer Ihrig	fullback		Fort Myers	5'8"	174	24
35	Wilbur James	fullback		Orlando	5'11"	186	19
6	J. Milton "Red" McEwan	halfback	2	Wauchula	5'8"	155	19
	Broward McClellan	halfback		Blountstown			
5	Harvey Yancey	halfback	1	Duval	5'10"	160	20

=== Scoring leaders ===
Player	Touchdowns	Extra points	Field goals	Safeties	Points
Carl Brumbaugh	11	9	0	0	75
Royce Goodbread	8	0	0	0	48
Tommy Owens	6	0	0	0	36
Red Bethea	6	0	0	0	36
Ed Sauls	5	0	0	0	30
Goof Bowyer	2	14	0	0	26
Clyde Crabtree	3	0	0	0	18
Dale Van Sickel	3	0	0	0	18
Rainey Cawthon	2	0	0	1	14
Red McEwen	2	0	0	0	12
Dutch Stanley	1	4	0	0	10
Frank Clark	1	0	0	0	6
Bo McClellan	1	0	0	0	6
Ben Clemons	0	1	0	0	1
TOTAL	51	28	0	1	336

=== Coaching staff ===
- Head coach: Charlie Bachman
- Assistants: Joe Bedenk (line), Chigger Browne (director of intramurals), Brady Cowell (freshmen), L. G. Haskell (director of physical education), Nash Higgins (varsity assistant and chief scout), Joe Holsinger (backfield), Alvin Pierson (freshmen assistant), John Piombo (trainer), George Weber (freshmen assistant), Frank Wright (direct of publicity)
- Varsity manager: Bill Bond
- Graduate manager: James R. Boyd
- Athletic director: Everett Yon

== See also ==
- History of the University of Florida
- 1928 College Football All-Southern Team
- 1928 College Football All-America Team

== Bibliography ==
- Carlson, Norm (2007). University of Florida Football Vault: The History of the Florida Gators. Atlanta, Georgia: Whitman Publishing, LLC. ISBN 978-0-7948-2298-9.
- Chastain, Bill (2002). The Steve Spurrier Story. Lanham, Maryland: Taylor Trade Publishing. ISBN 1-4617-0340-9.
- Golenbock, Peter (2002). Go Gators! An Oral History of Florida's Pursuit of Gridiron Glory. St. Petersburg, Florida: Legends Publishing, LLC. ISBN 0-9650782-1-3.
- Kerasotis, Peter (September 1, 2005). Stadium Stories: Florida Gators. Globe Pequot. ISBN 0-7627-3777-8.
- Pleasants, Julian M. (2006). Gator Tales: An Oral History of the University of Florida. Gainesville, Florida: University of Florida. ISBN 0-8130-3054-4.
- McEwen, Tom (1974). The Gators: A Story of Florida Football. Huntsville, Alabama: The Strode Publishers. ISBN 0-87397-025-X.
- Wilder, Robert E. (2011). Gridiron Glory Days: Football at Mercer, 1892–1942. Mercer University Press. ISBN 978-0-88146-267-8.
