= Alvin Pierson =

American football player and coach (1898–1974)

Biographical details
- Born: 1898; Carthage, South Dakota, U.S.
- Died: 1974 (aged 75–76)

Playing career
- 1919–1920: California
- 1920–1921: Nevada
- Positions: Tackle, guard

Coaching career (HC unless noted)
- 1925–1926: Colorado Mines (assistant)
- 1927–1932: Florida (assistant)
- 1933–1940: Tampa (assistant)
- 1941–1944: Fresno State (assistant)
- 1945: Fresno State
- 1949: Fresno State

Head coaching record
- Overall: 7–14–2

Alvin Peter "Pix" Pierson (1898 – 1974) was an American college football player and coach. He served as the head football coach at Fresno State College—now known as California State University, Fresno—in 1945 and again in 1949, compiling a record of 7–14–2.

== Early life ==
Pierson was born in 1898 in Carthage, South Dakota. He family moved to Sacramento, California in 1901 and later Modesto and Turlock. Pierson graduated from Turlock High School.

== College ==
Pierson played tackle on the freshman squad for Pomona College in 1917. He suffered a severe concussion during a game against Pomona High School on October 13, 1917. Pierson played for coach Andy Smith's California Golden Bears football "wonder teams" of the early 1920s. He then played for the Nevada Wolfpack.

== Coaching career ==
=== Florida ===
Pierson was an assistant for coaches Tom Sebring and Charlie Bachman for the Florida Gators of the University of Florida, part of the staff on its 1928 team.

=== Tampa ===
Pierson assisted fellow former Florida assistant Nash Higgins when he became head coach of the Tampa Spartans.

=== Fresno State ===
Pierson was hired as head coach of Fresno State.

== Head coaching record ==
Year	Team	Overall	Conference	Standing	Bowl/playoffs
Fresno State Bulldogs (Independent) (1945)
1945	Fresno State	4–6–2			
Fresno State Bulldogs (California Collegiate Athletic Association) (1949)
1949	Fresno State	3–8	1–3	T–3rd	
Fresno State:		7–14–2	1–3		
Total:		7–14–2			
