= Carlos Proctor =

American football player and coach (1907–1983)

- Proctor in 1929, as a player for Florida

Biographical details
- Born: August 14, 1907
- Died: November 7, 1983 (aged 76); Gainesville, Florida, U.S.

Playing career
- 1929–1930: Florida
- Position: Tackle

Coaching career (HC unless noted)

Football
- 1938: Florida (freshmen)

Golf
- 1940–1941: Florida

Accomplishments and honors

Awards
- University of Florida Athletic Hall of Fame

Carlos Ray Proctor (August 14, 1907 – November 7, 1983) was a college football player and coach. He was also a boxer. He later retired to become a rancher and president of the Alachua County Cattlemen's Association. Proctor was a prominent tackle for the Florida Gators. He was elected captain of the 1931 team, but got expelled from school. Proctor was also a Gator heavyweight boxer as an undergraduate, and then served as the team's head coach until the boxing program was suspended during World War II. During his brief professional boxing career, Proctor posted two wins, both by knockout, with no losses

Proctor attended Hillsborough High School in Tampa, where he played for coach Nash Higgins Hillsborough High Terriers football team with Jimmy Steele. Proctor kicked the field goal to defeat rival St. Pete and net the state championship. Proctor was an assistant coach for the Gators in the 1930s under head coach Josh Cody.

Proctor died a month after the University of Florida boxer's reunion of 1984.

== See also ==
- List of University of Florida Athletic Hall of Fame members
