= Ben Clemons =

American athlete & coach (1906–1984)

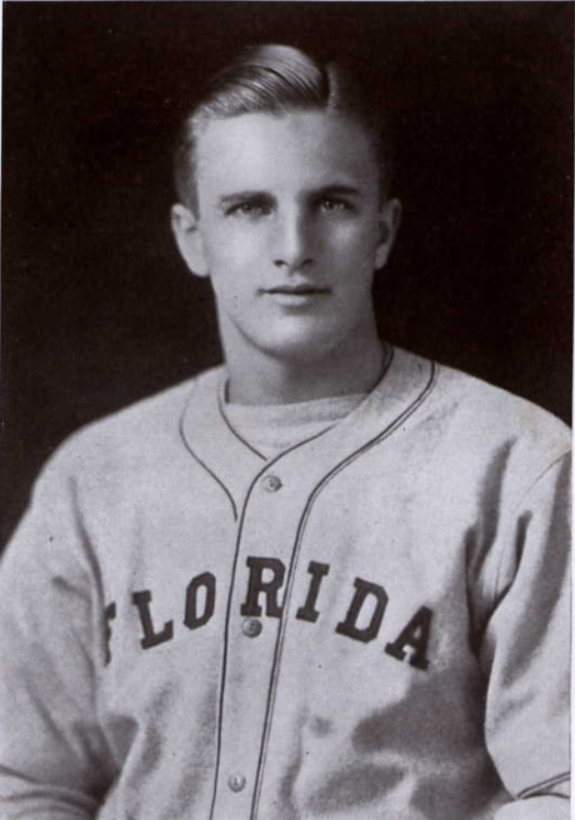

Biographical details
- Born: June 21, 1906; Havana, Florida, U.S.
- Died: July 26, 1984 (aged 78)
- Education: University of Florida

Playing career

Football
- 1928–1930: Florida

Baseball
- 1930–1932: Florida
- Positions: Center (football); Pitcher (baseball)

Coaching career (HC unless noted)

Football
- 1933–1935: Florida (assistant)
- 1939–1940: Stetson (assistant)
- 1941–?: The Citadel (assistant)

Basketball
- 1933–1941: Florida
- 1939–1941: Stetson
- 1941–1942: The Citadel
- 1943–1944: The Citadel
- 1946–1949: Stetson

Baseball
- 1934–1936: Florida
- 1947–1950: Stetson

Head coaching record
- Overall: 69–105 (basketball); 50–81–1 (baseball)

Accomplishments and honors

Awards
- University of Florida Athletic Hall of Fame

Walter N. "Ben" Clemons (June 21, 1906 – July 26, 1984) was an American basketball, baseball, and football player and coach for the Florida Gators.

== Early years ==
Clemons was a lifelong resident of Havana, Florida. He was a high school teammate of Rainey Cawthon at Leon High School. He was inducted into the Leon High School Hall of Fame in 1982.

== Playing career ==
Clemons attended the University of Florida. He was inducted into the University of Florida Hall of Fame in April 1984.

Clemons as football player, c. 1930

=== Football ===
He was a 195-pound center for coach Charlie Bachman's 1928 football team, splitting time with starter Frank Clark. The 1928 Gators were remembered by many sports commentators as the best Florida football team until at least the 1960s. An all-time Florida team selected by George Trevor in 1935 puts Clemons at second-team center, behind Welcome Shearer.

=== Basketball ===
Clemons tied as the team's leading scorer in the basketball season of 1929–30 with 136 points. In the 1931 Southern Conference tournament, Clemons was the high scorer in a victory over Georgia Tech. Dale Waters and Monk Dorsett also played both football and basketball with Clemons.

=== Baseball ===
Clemons pitched on the baseball team. He was captain of the baseball team in his senior season.

== Coaching career ==
Clemons coached at his alma mater from 1933 to 1936. He was the head coach of both the basketball and baseball teams, and an assistant for the varsity football team. Coach Clemons' basketball team once beat Adolph Rupp's Kentucky Wildcats in the SEC tournament, bringing Clemons to tears.

== See also ==
- List of University of Florida Athletic Hall of Fame members
