= Speedy Walker =

American football and basketball player (1906–2004)

Florida Gators
- Position: Halfback

Personal information
- Born: December 12, 1906; Olivet, Michigan, U.S.
- Died: March 1, 2004 (aged 97); Mobile, Alabama, U.S.
- Listed weight: 133 lb (60 kg)

Career information
- High school: Hillsborough
- College: Florida (1926–1927)

Awards and highlights
- University of Florida Athletic Hall of Fame

Ion Sessions "Speedy" Walker (December 12, 1906 – March 1, 2004) was an American college football and basketball player for the Florida Gators. He served in World War 2. He served with the 467th Heavy Bomb Group in England.

== Early life ==
Walker was born in Olivet, Michigan to Osa Walker and Lottie Sessions. By 1920 his family has moved to Oldsmar. Walker attended Hillsborough High School in Tampa, playing on the football team and basketball team with Dutch Stanley, where they were runner-up for the 1923 state football title, losing to Lakeland High School and Goof Bowyer. Walker was captain of the state champion 1923-24 basketball team.

== University of Florida ==
He was a prominent triple threat halfback for coach Tom Sebring's Florida Gators football teams in 1926 and 1927. The smallest member of the backfield, Walker played as a quarterback in 1924 on the freshman team. He backed up Bowyer at quarterback on the varsity. He was also the senior captain of the basketball team during the 1927–28 season. He was a forward on the basketball team. He also lettered in baseball. He was inducted into the University of Florida Athletic Hall of Fame.

== Coaching career ==
Following graduation, he coached the athletic teams at Bay County High School in Panama City.

== See also ==
- List of University of Florida Athletic Hall of Fame members
