= Goof Bowyer =

American football player and coach (1903–1988)

Biographical details
- Born: October 2, 1903; Tampa, Florida, U.S.
- Died: May 19, 1988 (aged 84); Gainesville, Florida

Playing career
- 1926–1928: Florida
- Positions: Quarterback, U.S.

Coaching career (HC unless noted)

Football
- 1929–1930: Lakeland HS (FL) (assistant)
- 1931–1932: Southern College
- 1933–1935: Florida (backfield)

Basketball
- 1932: Southern College

Administrative career (AD unless noted)
- 1931–1932: Southern College

Head coaching record
- Overall: 8–9–1 (college football)

Accomplishments and honors

Awards
- University of Florida Athletic Hall of Fame

Ernest J. "Goof" Bowyer (October 2, 1903 – May 19, 1988) was an American football and basketball coach and college athletics administrator. He served as the head football coach at Florida Southern College from 1931 to 1932.

== Early years ==
Bowyer attended Gainesville High, playing football for J. Rex Farrior and winning a state title. He then attended Lakeland High School in 1923, where he was again quarterback of the Florida state champion team.

=== University of Florida ===
Bowyer attended the University of Florida. He played for coach Tom Sebring and Charlie Bachman's Florida Gators football teams from 1925 to 1928. He was captain of the freshman team in his first year, and captain of the varsity in his senior season. In 1927, he broke his leg against Georgia, and was elected captain one month later. Bowyer was one of the school's greatest ever senior captains, leading what was remembered by many sports commentators as the best Florida football team until at least the 1960s.

== Coaching career ==
After serving as an assistant for his former high school, Bowyer was hired as head football coach and athletic director for the Florida Southern Moccasins. His 1932 basketball team posted a 10–3 record. In 1933 Bowyer took over as the Florida Gators backfield coach after the departure of Joe Holsinger, his former backfield coach.

== Death ==
Bowyer died on May 19, 1988.

== Head coaching record ==
=== College football ===
Year	Team	Overall	Conference	Standing	Bowl/playoffs
Southern College Moccasins (Independent) (1931–1932)
1931	Southern College	4–4–1			
1932	Southern College	4–5			
Southern College:		8–9–1			
Total:		8–9–1			

== See also ==
- List of University of Florida Athletic Hall of Fame members
