= Rainey Cawthon =

American football player and coach (1907–1991)

- Cawthon in 1956

No. 40
- Position: Halfback/Fullback
- Class: 1929

Personal information
- Born: October 30, 1907; Florida, U.S.
- Died: November 11, 1991 (aged 84); Tallahassee, Florida, U.S.
- Listed height: 5 ft 11 in (1.80 m)
- Listed weight: 180 lb (82 kg)

Career information
- High school: Tallahassee (FL) Leon
- College: Florida (1927–1929)

Awards and highlights
- All-Southern (1929); University of Florida Athletic Hall of Fame; FSU Hall of Fame

Rainey Blackwell Cawthon (October 30, 1907 – April 11, 1991) was an American football player and coach for the Florida Gators of the University of Florida. Cawthon was a member of Florida's "Phantom Four" backfield with Clyde Crabtree, Carl Brumbaugh, and Royce Goodbread in 1928 which led the nation with 336 points scored. He was also captain of the 1929 Florida team, and selected second-team for the composite All-Southern that year. He was inducted into the University of Florida Athletic Hall of Fame as a "Gator Great." Cawthon was also active in the affairs of Florida State University, and was elected to the FSU Hall of Fame in 1987.

== Early life ==
He attended Leon High School. Later college teammates Ben Clemons and Ed Sauls were high school teammates.

=== University of Florida ===
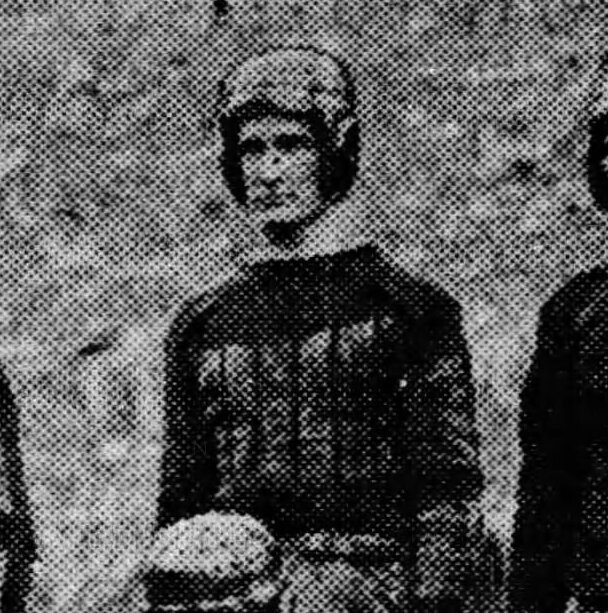
Cawthon in his Florida football uniform in November 1929

Cawthon was a prominent running back for Tom Sebring and Charlie Bachman's Florida Gators varsity football teams from 1927 to 1929. In Cawthon's sophomore year and first on the varsity, he suffered a broken wrist. Despite this he saw regular service in the backfield by the second game, and completed a 53-yard pass against Mercer. In 1928, Cawthon scored a safety against North Carolina State, a touchdown against Sewanee, and a touchdown against Clemson. He also had a 40-yard run in the 26–6 win over Georgia in Savannah, the first-ever victory over the Bulldogs in school history.

== See also ==
- List of University of Florida Athletic Hall of Fame members
