= Ray Parmely =

American athlete and sportswriter (1891–1927)

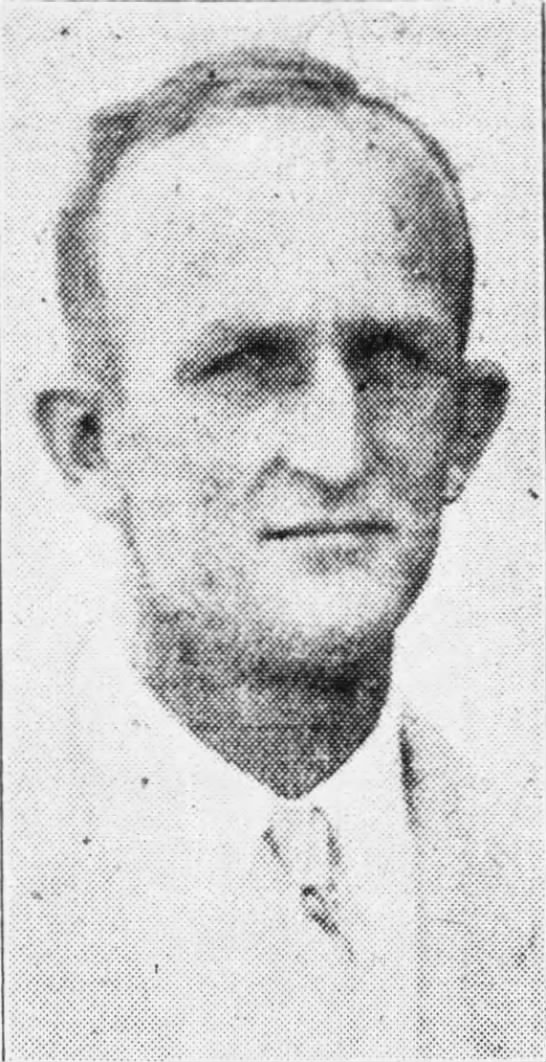
- Born: March 11, 1891; Waverly, Kansas, U.S.
- Died: January 23, 1927 (aged 35); Tampa, Florida
- Occupations: Sportswriter, U.S.

Charles Raymond Parmely (March 11, 1891 – January 23, 1927) was an American football player, newspaperman, soldier, coach, and referee. Parmely was born in Kansas and eventually settled in Florida. He was an athlete at Baker University. Parmely was also an accomplished singer.

After working at papers in the Rocky Mountains and Middle West, he became a sportswriter for the Tampa Times, "known throughout the state as a football expert." Parmely was coach of the Hillsborough High Terriers from 1920 to 1921. He was also much involved with the Tampa Smokers of the Florida State League, a baseball league. Parmely officiated at Florida Gators games, and boxing matches.

Parmely died following an automobile accident on January 6, 1927. Parmely steered into a telegraph pole to avoid a collision with another car. J. Watson Morse, staff photographer of the Tampa Times, was also killed in the accident. Others escaped without injury.
