= Jimmy Steele (American football) =

American football player and coach (1909–1980)

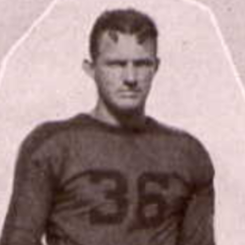
- Steele from 1931 Seminole yearbook

No. 36 – Florida Gators
- Positions: Tackle, guard

Personal information
- Born: December 11, 1909; Tampa, Florida
- Died: September 15, 1980 (aged 70); Hillsborough County, Florida
- Listed weight: 194 lb (88 kg)

Career information
- High school: Hillsborough
- College: Florida (1928–1930)

Awards and highlights
- Second-team All-American (1928); All-Southern (1928, 1929, 1930)

Steele in uniform for Florida in 1929

James Henry Steele, Jr. (December 11, 1909 – September 15, 1980), nicknamed Jimmy Steele, was an American college football player and coach for the Florida Gators football team of the University of Florida.

== Early life ==
A native of Tampa, Florida, he attended Hillsborough High School in Tampa, and played for coach Nash Higgins' Hillsborough Terriers high school football team.

=== University of Florida ===
After high school, Steele enrolled in the University of Florida in 1927, where he played for coach Charlie Bachman's Florida Gators football team from 1928 to 1930. He played at the tackle and guard positions for the great Gators of 1928, which finished with a win–loss record of 8–1, losing only their last game by a single point to the Tennessee Volunteers, 13–12. After the 1928 season, Steele was selected by the Newspaper Enterprise Association (NEA) as a second-team All-American. The guard position was very competitive in the south in 1928. One writer notes "Had not Vanderbilt possessed its Brown, Alabama its Hagler and Georgia Tech its Drennon, Florida Steele would have been on the 1928 All-Southern." In December 1929, the Miami Daily News and Metropolis called him "the best linesman in the south" and noted that, throughout the 1928 and 1929 seasons, he had, "game in and game out, been head and shoulders above any linesmen on the field." That same month, the Gators football team selected Leroy "Red" Bethea as captain of the 1930 team and Steele as the alternate captain. Following his 1930 senior season, United Press named him to its All-Southern first team.

== Coaching career ==
After graduating from Florida in 1931, Steele returned to his alma mater as line coach.

== Semi-pro ball ==
Steele also played semi-pro football for the Tampa All-Stars.

== See also ==
- Florida Gators football, 1920–29
- List of Florida Gators football All-Americans
- List of University of Florida alumni
