= Edward Barna Kurjack =

American anthropologist (1938–2014)

Edward Kurjack at the site of Cerros Jaboncillo, Manabi, Ecuador

Edward Barna Kurjack (1938 - 2014) was a Mayan anthropologist who was known for his contributions to the study of Mayan settlement patterns and society.

== Biography ==
Edward Barna Kurjack was born on July 29, 1938, in Brooklyn, New York. His father, Barna Joseph Kurjack was a professional photographer, building contractor and merchant seaman. His family moved to Ohio, Pennsylvania and Florida, where Edward graduated from Hillsborough High School, Tampa, in 1956. He went on to earn a BS degree from Florida State University in 1962, an MA from the University of Alabama in 1964, and a Ph.D. from Ohio State University in 1972.

Kurjack’s first encounter with archaeological fieldwork was a salvage project under the direction of Dr. Charles Fairbanks in the Weiss Basin of the Coosa River in northwestern Alabama during the summer of 1959. Subsequently Kurkack was appointed as Laboratory Chief of the Alabama Museum of Natural History’s Weiss Basin Archaeological Project, a position he served from June 1960 to January, 1961. Kurjack's work as field director of the Stanfield-Worley Bluff Shelter excavations during the summer of 1961 under the direction of Prof. David L. DeJarnette led to analysis of the Stanfield-Worley materials for publication. From September, 1961 to November, 1962 Kurjack worked as an archaeologist on the University of Alabama’s field operation in the Walter F. George Basin of the Chattahoochee River.

After completion of the University of Alabama fieldwork, E.B. Kurjack was invited to join the Middle American Research Institute’s project at Dzibilchaltun, Mexico. From November 1962 to August 1964 he worked under the direction of Dr. E. Wyllys Andrews IV on a settlement pattern study of that site.

Kurjack began his teaching career as an Instructor and Curator of the Anthropology Museum at Miami University, Oxford, Ohio. In 1967 he led field investigations on the “Urn Burial Caves of Salangsang” project in the mountains of western Mindanao. He continued to teach at Miami until August 1971. After returning from the Philippines, Kurjack began residence at the Ohio State University Graduate School, where he worked as a teaching assistant from January, 1968 to March, 1969. In 1971, Kurjack joined the faculty of Western Illinois University as an Assistant Professor of Anthropology. He advanced to Associate Professor in 1973, was granted tenure in 1974, and received full professorship in 1979.

Kurjack spent his summers, leaves of absence, and sabbaticals carrying out research on the Yucatan Peninsula of Mexico as Coordinador of the “Proyecto Atlas Arqueológico de Yucatán, Centro Regional De Yucatán, Instituto Nacional de Antropología e Historia, Mérida, Yucatán, México. He served as Coordinador of the “Reconociemento del Valle, Proyecto Copán, del Secretaría de Estado en Despacho de Cultura, Turismo y Información,” from December, 1977 to July, 1978.

To facilitate foreign area research, the Middle American Research Institute of Tulane University, the Precolumbian Art Research Institute of San Francisco, and the Philippine National Museum granted Kurjack honorary positions in their organizations. He held a regular civil service appointment in the Mexican government with their National Institute of Anthropology and History for several years.

Kurjack has worked extensively studying sacbeob and social organization and is involved in archaeological research projects in Mexico, Puerto Rico, and Ecuador.

Kurjack proposed that Dzibilchaltun was composed of several classes, not just upper and lower class, but a middle class that could be analogous to the Western merchant class. This theory contradicts earlier arguments that state there were just two classes, the upper religious leader class and the lower 'peasant' class. He was honored with a special session, "Regional and Community Organization in the Northern Lowlands: Papers in Honor of the Life and Legacy of Ed Kurjack", at the annual meeting of the Society for American Arachaeology, San Juan, Puerto Rico, April 29, 2006.

Edward Kurjack died on August 2, 2014, in Melbourne Florida.

== Bibliography ==
- Edward B. Kurjack, E. Wyllys Andrews, V American Antiquity, Vol. 41, No. 3 (Jul., 1976), pp. 318–325
- Edward B. Kurjack Reviewed work(s): Geografía Económica de México (Siglo XVI) by Alejandra Moreno Toscano American Anthropologist, New Series, Vol. 75, No. 6 (Dec., 1973), pp. 1808–1809
- Melvin L. Fowler Reviewed work(s): Stanfield-Worley Bluff Shelter Excavations by David DeJarnette; Edward Kurjack; James W. Cambron American Antiquity, Vol. 30, No. 4 (Apr., 1965), p. 515
- David L. Webster Reviewed work(s): Map of the Ruins of Dzibilchaltun, Yucatan, Mexico by George E. Stuart; John C. Scheffler; Edward B. Kurjack; John W. Cottier American Antiquity, Vol. 47, No. 1 (Jan., 1982), p. 246
- Garza T. de González, Silvia y Edward.B. Kurjack Bacso. Atlas Arqueológico del Estado de Yucatán, Tomo 1. Instituto Nacional de Antropología e Historia, México, 1980
- Kurjack, Edward B. 1974 Prehistoric Lowland Maya Community and Social Organization: A Case of Study at Dzibilchaltun, Yucatan, Mexico. Middle American Research Institute, Pub.38. Tulane University, New Orleans.
