= Joe Holsinger =

American athlete and coach (1904–1946)

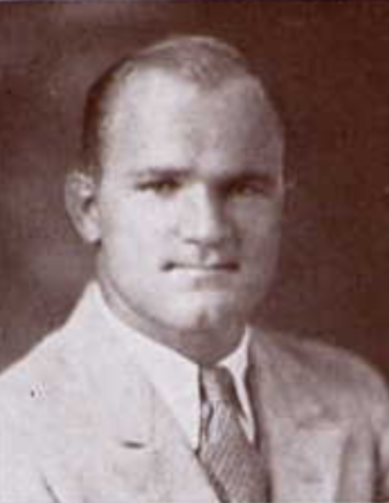

Biographical details
- Born: January 20, 1904
- Died: August 16, 1946 (aged 42); Jefferson City, Missouri, U.S.

Playing career

Football
- 1925–1927: Kansas State
- Position(s): Halfback

Coaching career (HC unless noted)

Football
- 1928–1932: Florida (backfield)
- 1933–1934: Wisconsin (assistant)
- 1939–1945: Michigan State (assistant)

Basketball
- 1935–1939: Dayton

Golf
- 1930–1933: Florida
- 1935–1939: Dayton

Accomplishments and honors

Awards
- 2× Second-team All-MVC (1926, 1927)

Joe F. Holsinger (January 20, 1904 – August 16, 1946) was an American football, basketball, and golf player and coach. Holsinger was a star athlete for the Kansas State Wildcats. He was then a backfield coach under Charlie Bachman for the Florida Gators, coaching the "Phantom Four" of 1928, and for the Michigan State Spartans. In 1935, he became the head basketball and golf coach for the Dayton Flyers.
