= Dale Waters =

American football player (1909–2001)

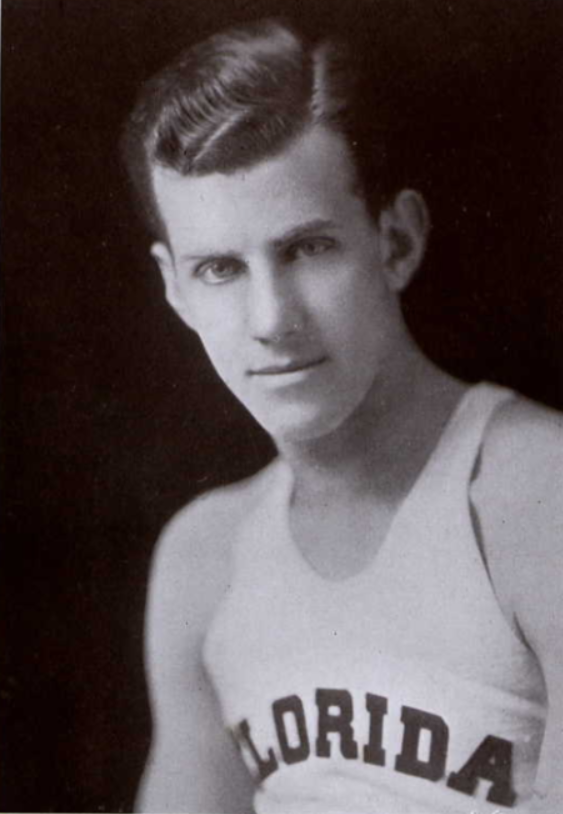
- Waters from 1931 Seminole yearbook

Profile
- Position: Lineman

Personal information
- Born: May 27, 1909; Henry County, Indiana, U.S.
- Died: December 19, 2001 (aged 92); Prescott, Arizona, U.S.
- Listed height: 6 ft 2 in (1.88 m)
- Listed weight: 212 lb (96 kg)

Career information
- High school: Newcastle (IN)
- College: Florida

Career history
- Cleveland Indians (1931); Portsmouth Spartans (1931); Boston Braves/Redskins (1932–1933)

Awards and highlights
- Second-team All-Southern (1930)

Career NFL statistics
- Games played: 27
- Games started: 12
- Stats at Pro Football Reference

Dale Barnard Waters (May 27, 1909 – December 19, 2001), nicknamed "Muddy" Waters, was an American college and professional football player who was an offensive and defensive lineman in the National Football League (NFL) for three seasons during the early 1930s. Waters played college football for the University of Florida, and thereafter, he played for three different NFL teams.

== Early life ==
Waters was born in Henry County, Indiana in 1909. He attended Newcastle High School in Newcastle Township, Fulton County, Indiana.

== College career ==
Waters in uniform for Florida football in 1929

Waters attended the University of Florida in Gainesville, Florida, where he was an offensive and defensive lineman and varsity letterman for coach Charlie Bachman's Florida Gators football team in 1928, 1929 and 1930. When he first reported to the freshman team, he weighed just 165 pounds.

Waters was a member of the 1928 Gators team which led the nation in scoring and finished 8–1, losing only to the Tennessee Volunteers by a single point, 13–12. Following his 1930 senior season, he received honorable mention All-American honors from the Associated Press.

He was also a guard for the Florida Gators basketball team, lettering in 1929, 1930 and 1931, and serving as the Gators' team captain as a senior in 1931. He was rated as one of the best guards in the south.

Waters graduated from the University of Florida with a bachelor's degree in physical education in 1935.

== Professional career ==
Waters became a professional football offensive lineman for the NFL's Cleveland Indians (1931), Portsmouth Spartans (1931), and the Boston Braves/Redskins (1932–1933). During his three-season NFL career, Waters played in twenty-seven regular season NFL games, and started in twelve of them.

== Coaching and administrative career ==
Waters spent many years at Texas Western University (now the University of Texas at El Paso) as the men's basketball head coach and an assistant football coach, also earning a master's degree at the school. In 1957 he became El Paso's district athletic director.

== See also ==
- List of Florida Gators in the NFL draft
- List of University of Florida alumni
- List of Washington Redskins players
