= J. Rex Farrior =

American football and baseball player and coach (1896–1993)

Biographical details
- Born: October 5, 1896; Chipley, Florida, U.S.
- Died: January 17, 1993 (aged 96); Tampa, Florida, U.S.

Playing career
- 1912: Tampa A. C.
- 1913–1916: Florida
- Positions: Guard, center, fullback (football)

Coaching career (HC unless noted)

Football
- 1917: Florida (assistant)
- 1920-1922: Gainesville HS (FL)
- 1923: Florida (freshmen)

Baseball
- 1924: Florida

Head coaching record
- Overall: 5–14 (college baseball)

Accomplishments and honors

Awards
- University of Florida Athletic Hall of Fame; Florida Sports Hall of Fame; Outstanding Contribution to Amateur Football Award (1986)

Jewel Rex Farrior Sr. (October 5, 1896 – January 17, 1993) was an American college football and baseball player and coach for the Florida Gators of the University of Florida, as well as a lawyer. He became a founding partner in a prominent Tampa-based law firm, and remained one of the biggest boosters of the Gators sports program until his death.

== Early years ==
Farrior was born October 5, 1896, in Chipley, Florida, to Joseph R. Farrior and Gussie Brown. His father was a physician.

Farrior attended Hillsborough High School in Tampa, where he played football and baseball, graduating in 1913. Future Gator teammate Rammy Ramsdell was in the same class.

== University of Florida ==
Farrior is the namesake of Farrior Hall on the UF campus.

=== Football ===
Farrior was a prominent guard and center for the Florida Gators football team from 1913 to 1916. His first ever game was the 144–0 victory over the Florida Southern Moccasins.

Farrior was captain of the football team in his senior year. In that season the Gators lost all their games, suffering multiple injures and transfers, requiring Farrior to shift to fullback. He broke his ankle that year in the Indiana game. A member of the fraternity Kappa Alpha Order at UF, the Kappa Alpha Journal reads "J. Rex Farrior of the University of Florida has been for several seasons the 'Gators most brilliant performer."

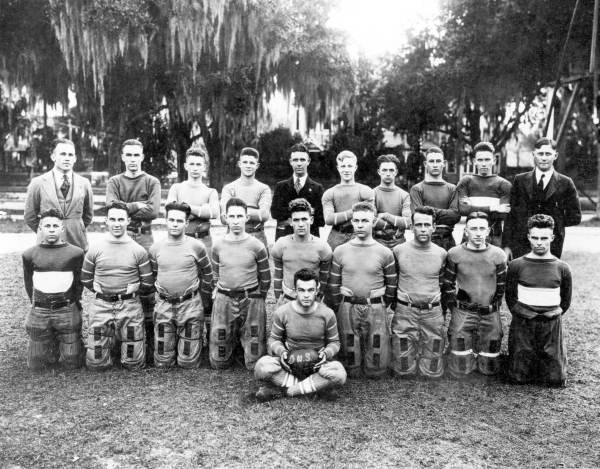
1920 Gainesville High football team. Farrior is back left.

He was nominated though not selected for an Associated Press All-Time Southeast 1869-1919 era team. As a football player, he was inducted into the University of Florida Athletic Hall of Fame. The "Rex Farrior Award" was once given to the most "team-oriented" player. Originally the award was given to the defensive lineman who showed the most effort.

=== Return to UF and coaching ===
Farrior to Florida in 1921 after serving in World War I to earn his law degree, graduating in 1924.

==== Gainesville High ====
From 1920 to 1922, Farrior coached the Gainesville High School Purple Hurricane football team. The 1922 team was his best and won a state title. Athletes who played for him include Jack McDowall, Lamar Sarra, and Goof Bowyer.

==== Florida ====
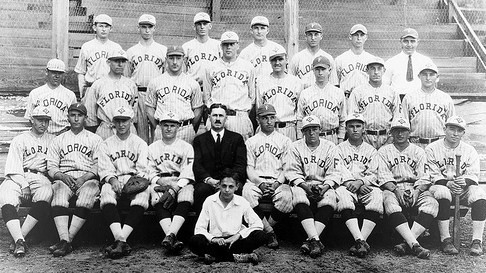
A picture of the 1924 baseball team.

Farrior coached the 1924 baseball team. In his one-season the team posted a 5–14 record.

==== Cigar Bowl ====
Farrior was chairman of the selection committee for the Cigar Bowl.

== Law practice ==
Farrior became a partner in Shackleford and Farrior, which evolved into one of Tampa's largest law firms. Law partner Bob Shackleford was a former Florida Gator quarterback. Farrior was elected president of the Florida Bar in 1975.

== See also ==
- List of University of Florida Athletic Hall of Fame members
