= Carl Brumbaugh =

American football player (1906–1969)

No. 8, 6
- Positions: Halfback, quarterback

Personal information
- Born: September 22, 1906; West Milton, Ohio, U.S.
- Died: October 24, 1969 (aged 63); West Milton, Ohio, U.S.
- Listed height: 5 ft 10 in (1.78 m)
- Listed weight: 170 lb (77 kg)

Career information
- High school: West Milton (OH)
- College: Ohio State; Florida

Career history

Playing
- Chicago Bears (1930–1936); Cleveland Rams (1937); Brooklyn Dodgers (1937); Chicago Bears (1937–1938)

Coaching
- Chicago Bears (1940) Offensive backfield; Boston College (1941–1943) Offensive backfield; Chicago Bears (1944) Offensive backfield; Cincinnati (1946–1947) Offensive backfield; Holy Cross (1948–1949) Offensive backfield

Awards and highlights
- 2× NFL champion (1932, 1933); Second-team All-Pro (1931); University of Florida Athletic Hall of Fame

Career NFL statistics
- Passing attempts: 121
- Passing completions: 34
- Completion percentage: 28.1%
- TD–INT: 9–14
- Passing yards: 656
- Passer rating: 34.9
- Stats at Pro Football Reference

Carl Lowry Brumbaugh (September 22, 1906 – October 24, 1969) was an American college and professional football player and coach who was a quarterback and halfback in the National Football League (NFL) for nine seasons in the 1930s. Brumbaugh played college football for Ohio State University and the University of Florida, and thereafter, he played professionally for the Chicago Bears, Cleveland Rams and Brooklyn Dodgers of the NFL.

== Early life ==
Brumbaugh was born in West Milton, Ohio in 1906, and attended West Milton High School.

== College career ==
After graduating from high school, he attended Ohio State University in Columbus, Ohio and then the University of Florida in Gainesville, Florida, where he played for the Ohio State Buckeyes football team and the Florida Gators football team, respectively. He played for the Gators in 1926, 1927, and 1928, and Brumbaugh, Rainey Cawthon, Clyde Crabtree and Royce Goodbread were members of the 1928 Gators' "Phantom Four" backfield that helped the team lead the country with 336 points scored. The Gators finished the 1928 season 8–1, losing only to the Tennessee Volunteers by a single point, 13–12. Brumbaugh was later inducted into the University of Florida Athletic Hall of Fame as a "Gator Great."

== Professional career ==
During his nine-year NFL career, he played for the Chicago Bears from 1930 to 1936, the Cleveland Rams in 1937, the Brooklyn Dodgers in 1937, and finished with the Bears in 1937 and 1938. Brumbaugh was a member of the legendary early 1930s Bears teams that included future hall of famers Red Grange and Bronko Nagurski, won the NFL Championships in 1932 and 1933, and played for a third in 1934.

After his playing career, Brumbaugh was the backfield coach for the Bears and at Boston College, Cincinnati, and Holy Cross.

Brumbaugh died in his hometown of West Milton, Ohio on October 24, 1969; he was 63 years old.

== See also ==
- Defunct National Football League franchises
- History of the Chicago Bears
- List of Chicago Bears players
- List of St. Louis Rams players
- List of University of Florida alumni
- List of University of Florida Athletic Hall of Fame members
