= Nash Higgins =

American athletics coach (1896–1984)

- Higgins in the Seminole c. 1929

Biographical details
- Born: February 29, 1896; Joliet, Illinois, U.S.
- Died: October 29, 1984 (aged 88); Tampa, Florida, U.S.
- Education: Wabash College

Coaching career (HC unless noted)

Football
- ?: Joliet HS (IL)
- 1920–1922: Earlham (assistant)
- 1926: Hillsborough HS (FL)
- 1927–1932: Florida (assistant)
- 1933–1940: Tampa

Track and field
- 1920–1922: Earlham (assistant)
- 1923–1925: Wabash
- 1928–1933: Florida

Administrative career (AD unless noted)
- 1923–1925: Wabash (assistant AD)
- 1933–1940: Tampa

Head coaching record
- Overall: 36–39–5 (college football)

Accomplishments and honors

Awards
- Florida Sports Hall of Fame; Tampa Athletic Hall of Fame; NAIA Football Hall of Fame

Alfred Nash Higgins (February 29, 1896 – October 29, 1984) was an American football and track and field coach as well as athletic director, the first in the history of the University of Tampa. He later worked as superintendent of recreation for the Hillsborough County Defense Council and the county's school department athletic facilities planner.

== Early years ==
Higgins attended Wabash College.

== Coaching career ==
=== Earlham ===
Higgins was an assistant under coach Ray Mowe at Earlham College.

=== Wabash ===
Higgins coached track and field at his alma mater. The 1923 track team tied for 11th place in the NCAA meet at Stagg Field.

=== Hillsborough High ===
Higgins coached at Hillsborough High School in Tampa, Florida in 1926, leading his team to the state championship. On the team were Jimmy Steele and Carlos Proctor. Proctor gave rival St. Petersburg High School its only loss with a field goal.

=== Florida ===
Higgins came to the University of Florida after coaching football at Hillsborough. He was an assistant football coach, holding the title of chief football scout, and head track coach under Charlie Bachman for the Florida Gators. The 1928 Florida Gators football team led the nation in scoring. He was expected to follow Bachman as head coach, already recommended by the committee on athletics, when 26-year old Dutch Stanley was hired.

=== Tampa ===
After his time with the Gators, he was the first head coach and athletic director at the University of Tampa. In a March 27, 1933 letter, offering the position of athletic director to Higgins, university president Frederic Spaulding wrote: "We particularly want anyone who accepts a position with us to feel enthusiastic about the school, and freely and wholeheartedly devote himself to its growth and improvement. We want men who are willing to give their best service unstintingly, and feel they are making an investment for the future."

Higgins picked the school's colors of red, black, and gold; combining those of Hillsborough High (red and black) with Plant High School (gold and black). His assistant while at Tampa was former fellow Gator assistant Alvin Pierson.

Tampa still holds the Nash Higgins Relays named in his honor. He was inducted into the Tampa Athletics Hall of Fame in 1962; and the NAIA Football Hall of Fame in 1959.

== Head coaching record ==
=== College football ===
Year	Team	Overall	Conference	Standing	Bowl/playoffs
Tampa Spartans (Independent) (1933–1937)
1933	Tampa	6–2–2			
1934	Tampa	8–4			
1935	Tampa	5–5			
1936	Tampa	5–3–2			
1937	Tampa	4–5			
Tampa Spartans (Southern Intercollegiate Athletic Association) (1938–1940)
1938	Tampa	3–7	0–4	T–33rd	
1939	Tampa	2–7–1	0–3–1	T–30th	
1940	Tampa	3–6	2–4	T–19th	
Tampa:		36–39–5	2–11–1		
Total:		36–39–5			
