= Dale Van Sickel =

American football player and actor (1907-1977)

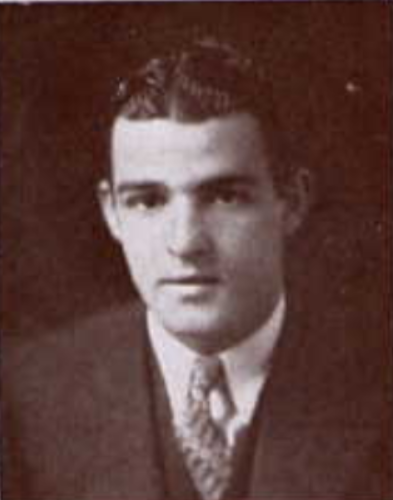
- Van Sickel in 1930 Seminole yearbook

No. 39 – Florida Gators
- Position: End
- Class: Graduate (B.A. 1930)

Personal information
- Born: November 29, 1907; Eatonton, Georgia, U.S.
- Died: January 25, 1977 (aged 69); Newport Beach, California, U.S.
- Listed height: 5 ft 10 in (1.78 m)
- Listed weight: 170 lb (77 kg)

Career information
- High school: Gainesville (Gainesville, Florida)
- College: Florida (1927–1929)

Awards and highlights
- First-team All-American (1928); Second-team All-American (1929); 2× First-team All-Southern (1928, 1929); University of Florida Athletic Hall of Fame
- College Football Hall of Fame (Class of 1975)

Dale Harris Van Sickel (November 29, 1907 – January 25, 1977) was an American college football, basketball and baseball player during the 1920s. He later became a Hollywood motion picture actor and stunt performer for over forty years. Van Sickel played college football for the University of Florida, and was recognized as the first-ever first-team All-American in the history of the Florida Gators football program.

== Early life ==
Dale Van Sickel was born in Eatonton, Georgia, on November 29, 1907 to William Milton Van Sickel and Ella McGaen, but grew up in Gainesville, Florida. His father William owned a photography studio in Gainesville. The family came to Georgia originally from Guernsey County, Ohio.

=== High school ===
Van Sickel attended Gainesville High School, where he played high school football for the Gainesville Purple Hurricanes. Dale's older brother Talmadge had also been an all-state player for Gainesville High. In 2007, eighty-one years after he graduated from high school, the Florida High School Athletic Association (FHSAA) recognized Dale Van Sickel as one of the "100 Greatest Players of the First 100 Years" of Florida high school football. He is generally regarded as the best high school football player produced in the state of Florida before the 1930s.

== College career ==
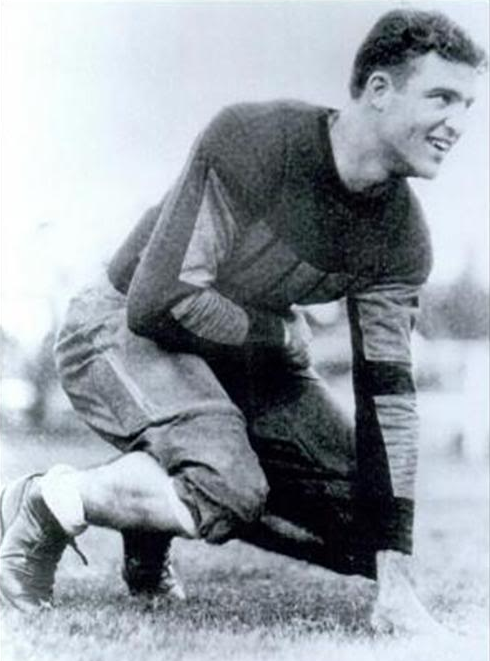
Van Sickel in a three-point stance.

Van Stickel in uniform for Florida during the 1929 football season

Van Sickel attended the University of Florida in Gainesville. He played right end for the Florida Gators football team for three seasons from 1927 to 1929, on the opposite side of the line from left end Dutch Stanley. During his three years as a member of the Gators varsity, the team won twenty-three of twenty-nine games. Led by future Hall of Fame coach Charlie Bachman in 1928, Van Sickel and the Gators posted an 8–1 record during his junior season, outscoring their competition 366–44—the most points scored in the nation. The Gators' sole 1928 loss was to Tennessee in Knoxville, Tennessee—by a single point, 12–13. The Associated Press, Newspaper Enterprise Association and Grantland Rice of Collier's Weekly named Van Sickel to their respective 1928 first-team All-America squads, making him the first player from the University of Florida to be named a first-team All-American. As was typical of the 1920s era, Van Sickel played both offense and defense; his College Hall of Fame biography describes him as "a swift and sure-handed receiver on offense and a gifted defensive player." Van Sickel was injured during his senior football season in 1929, and while he was productive, he was unable to post the same sort of numbers in 1929 that he did during his 1928 All-American season. He was also a first-team All-Southern selection in both 1928 and 1929.

Van Sickel was also the team captain and a varsity letterman for the Florida Gators basketball and Gators baseball teams. He was later inducted into the University of Florida Athletic Hall of Fame as a "Gator Great," and he was also the first Gator to be inducted into the College Football Hall of Fame in 1975. The sportswriters of The Gainesville Sun selected him as the No. 11 all-time Gator player among the top 100 from the first century of Florida football in 2006.

Van Sickel graduated from the University of Florida with a bachelor's degree in 1930, and he remained at the university to be an assistant coach for the Gators football and basketball teams during the 1930 and 1931 seasons.

== Hollywood career ==
After his two-year coaching career, Van Sickel moved to Hollywood to begin a career as a movie stuntman, and had his first on-screen stunt role in the Marx Brothers' 1933 film Duck Soup. Over the next thirty-eight years, Van Sickel appeared as an extra and occasional leading man in over 280 films and television episodes, and performed on-screen stunts in another 140. He is central to popular lore involving Adventures of Superman stunts: In 104 episodes, Superman only ducked a thrown gun once. It was Van Sickel, subbing for star George Reeves, who ducked. He also played supporting characters in a couple of episodes in the series. In addition to appearing in numerous B movies, Van Sickel was a stunt man and on-screen extra in such Hollywood classics as The Searchers, North by Northwest and Spartacus. He was a founding member and the first president of the Stuntmen's Association of Motion Pictures.

Van Sickel died in 1977 in Newport Beach, California as a result of injuries received while filming a car crash stunt in 1975; he was 69 years old. Van Sickel was survived by his wife Iris and their daughter.

== Selected filmography ==
- Laugh It Off (1939) – Policeman
- Hellzapoppin (1941) – Frankenstein's monster (uncredited)
- Black Arrow (1944) – Henchman
- Renegades of Sonora (1948) – Brad (Henchman)
- Street Corner (1948) – The Passing Motorist
- The Golden Stallion (1949) – Henchman Ed Hart
- Radar Men from the Moon (1951) – Alon
- Northern Patrol (1953) – Jason
- Highway Patrol (1957) S2, E18, "Statute of Limitations"
- North by Northwest (1959) – Ranger (uncredited)
- Colgate Theatre (TV series, 1958) – episode "The Last Marshal"
- My Blood Runs Cold (1965) – Trucker (uncredited)
- Requiem for a Gunfighter (1965) – Kelly
- The Great Race (1965) – Driver-Contestant in Green Car, #3 (uncredited)
- Town Tamer (1965) – Bartender
- That Funny Feeling (1965) – Taxi Driver (uncredited)
- Johnny Reno (1966) – Ab Conners
- Cyborg 2087 (1966) – Tracer #1
- Murderers' Row (1966) – Fortress Guard (uncredited)
- A Guide for the Married Man (1967) – Driver (uncredited)
- The Gnome-Mobile (1967) – Uniformed Guard (uncredited)
- The Flim-Flam Man (1967) – Deputy Guard (uncredited)
- The Love Bug (1969) – Driver
- Duel (TV movie, 1971) – Car Driver (Stunt driver for Dennis Weaver)

== See also ==
- 1928 College Football All-America Team
- 1929 College Football All-America Team
- List of College Football Hall of Fame inductees (players, A–K)
- List of College Football Hall of Fame inductees (players, L–Z)
- List of Florida Gators football All-Americans
- List of University of Florida alumni
- List of University of Florida Athletic Hall of Fame members
