= Hillsborough High School (Tampa, Florida) =

Public school in Florida, United States

Location
- 5000 Central Avenue; Tampa, Florida 33603; United States; 27°59′29″N 82°27′21″W

Information
- School type: Public, high school
- Motto: Latin: Possunt quia posse videntur (They can because they think they can)
- Established: 1882; 144 years ago 1885: first graduating class 1928; 98 years ago (Present campus)
- School district: Hillsborough County Public Schools
- Principal: Kevin Gordon
- Teaching staff: 89.00 (FTE)
- Grades: 9–12
- Enrollment: 1,768 (2023-2024)
- Student to teacher ratio: 19.87
- Campus: Urban
- Colors: Red; Black
- Mascot: Terrier
- Newspaper: The Red & Black
- Yearbook: The Hilsborean
- Website: www.hillsboroughschools.org/o/hillsborough
- Hillsborough High School
- U.S. Historic district – Contributing property
- Location within Florida Location within the United States
- Built: 1928
- Architect: Francis Kennard
- Architectural style: Gothic Revival
- Part of: Seminole Heights; Residential District (ID93000751)
- Designated CP: August 5, 1993

Hillsborough High School is a public high school located at 5000 N. Central Ave, in the heart of the historic Seminole Heights neighborhood, in Tampa, Florida, United States. Hillsborough High is the oldest public high school in Hillsborough County, Florida.

Hillsborough High is one of five Hillsborough county public high schools with an International Baccalaureate program.

== History and traditions ==
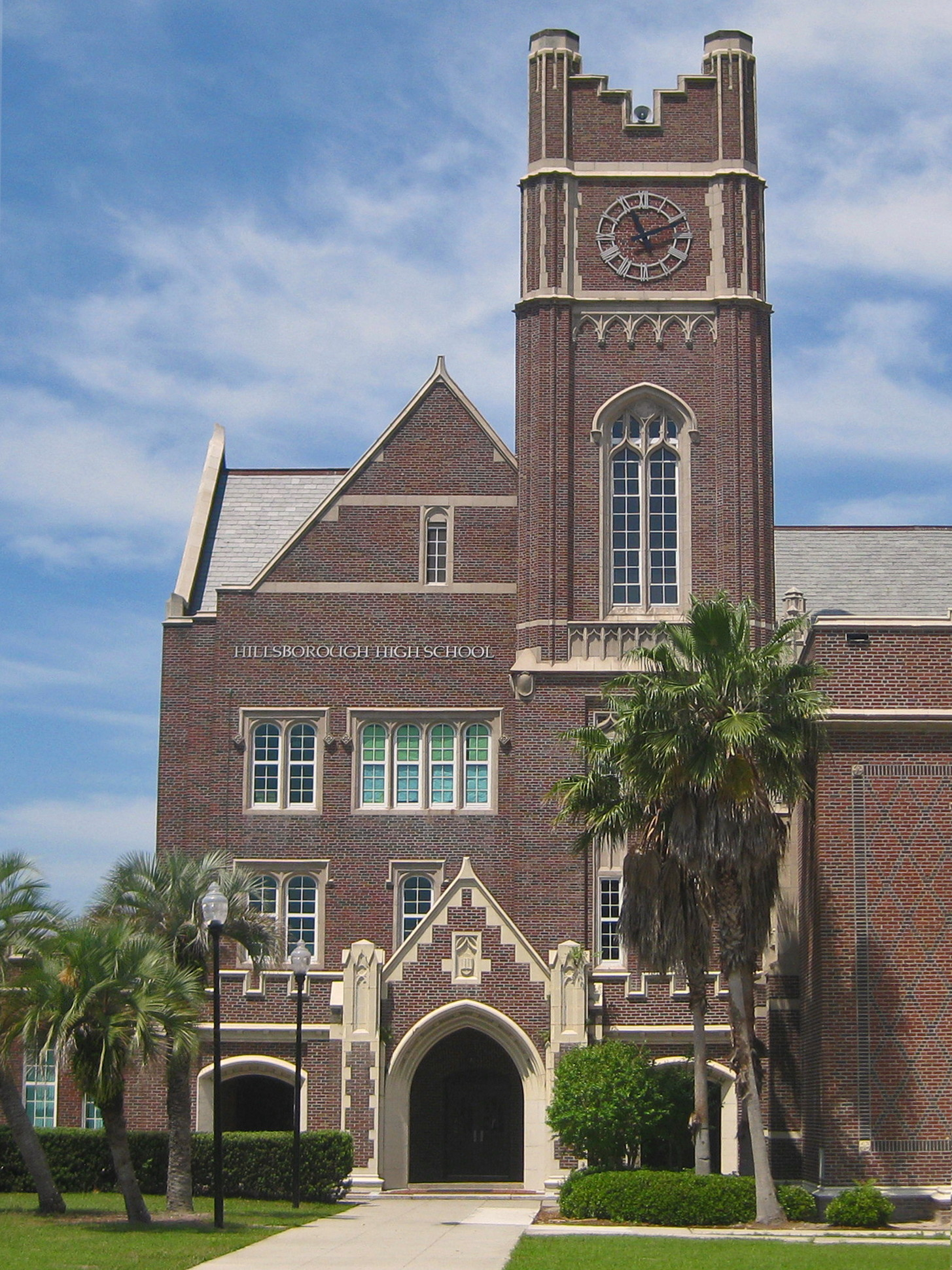
Main entrance and clock tower.

Hillsborough High School is one of the South's oldest high schools. Although mystery surrounded the beginning of the school for many decades, in 2003 discovered documents preserved in the cornerstone of the HHS building of 1911 have confirmed that the school had its first students in 1882, and graduated its first class of four students in 1886 (Class of 1885–1886). Mrs. Mary Cuscaden was the first principal. One of the 1886 diplomas is preserved in the school's vault. Until a second high school was opened, the school's correct name was "The Hillsborough County High School". The first new HHS building was funded out of the savings from the general school fund. After the freeze of 1895, by careful management, money was saved and the first county high school was erected. At a contract price of $5,100 (equivalent to $197,000 in 2025), a well-planned, two-story wooden building with science laboratories, a library and an auditorium was built large enough to accommodate as many as 250 high school students. Once the first free standing HHS school location was out grown, a new home was sought, which is now referred to as the Old Hillsborough High School, to replace it, and was built in 1911 on a design by Wilson Potter of New York. It was expanded in 1923 according to designs by M. Leo Elliott. Hillsborough High School moved into its present-day home, a gothic architectural design by Francis J. Kennard, which was completed and has been the school's home since 1928.

B.C. Graham, one of the first teachers was also the third principal, and the first graduating class of four students was in 1886, under Principal Graham. One of the oldest traditions is the wearing of red and black, the school's colors, every Friday to show spirit and unity. Hillsborough has many illustrious alumni, some of whom have served as State Attorney, senators, judges, state representatives, mayors, professional athletes, educators, scholars, and other professions. Among the many illustrious alumni is a Medal of Honor recipient, 1st Lt. Baldomero Lopez USMC.

Hillsborough produced the first high school newspaper in Florida in 1889, The Red & Black, and the first yearbook in Florida, The Hillsborean, in 1911.

The alma mater, "The Red and Black," was written in 1923. In 1931, Hillsborough High became the first home of the University of Tampa, established by Frederic Spaulding in 1931 as Tampa Junior College. In 1933, University Of Tampa moved to its current home in the old Tampa Bay Hotel, now named Plant Hall. In 1949, HHS students purchased the clock for the clock tower, in honor of Hillsborough's veteran casualties in World War II. The names of Hillsborough alumni, who were killed in action during the war were placed on a plaque under the tower. The Terrier Creed was written by the Class of 1957; it received much publicity as the only one of its kind in the South. The bronze terrier that guards the trophy case was originally placed in the courtyard by the Class of 1958. The sacred "H" on the patio was dedicated in 1964 in honor of Mr. Hamilton, an assistant principal. HHS students from different graduating classes raised the funds, providing the stained glass windows in the auditorium in 1963.

Over the years, Hillsborough High School, garnered some nicknames. "Harvard on the Hill" stems partly from the fact that Hillsborough High School was built on one of the highest geographical elevations in Tampa, had graduated many illustrious people, and emulated many of Harvard's traditions with regard to its alma mater and school color scheme, a crimson shade of red and black, and the big letter H. Historically, the colors red and black represent heart and soul. Later, Hillsborough High also picked up the nickname "Peyton Place," probably sometime in the late 1960s or early 1970s, because the opening scene of the tower in the popular Peyton Place television soap opera somehow reminded some individuals of Hillsborough High's clock tower, and also because as one teacher put it, "it seemed there was always some sort of soap opera going on at the school."

On September 5, 1996, during a campaign for re-election, the 42nd U.S. President, Bill Clinton, spoke at Hillsborough High School about national education policy and "other" family issues, addressing students. President Clinton was originally scheduled to visit during the summer sessions, but had to cancel because of hurricane warnings. Student Council President Erica Allen, warmly greeted President Clinton, the two shook hands, and Erica received a hug from the President, just before Clinton's speech to the student body. HHS received national attention because of President Clinton's visit.

== Renovations and expansions ==
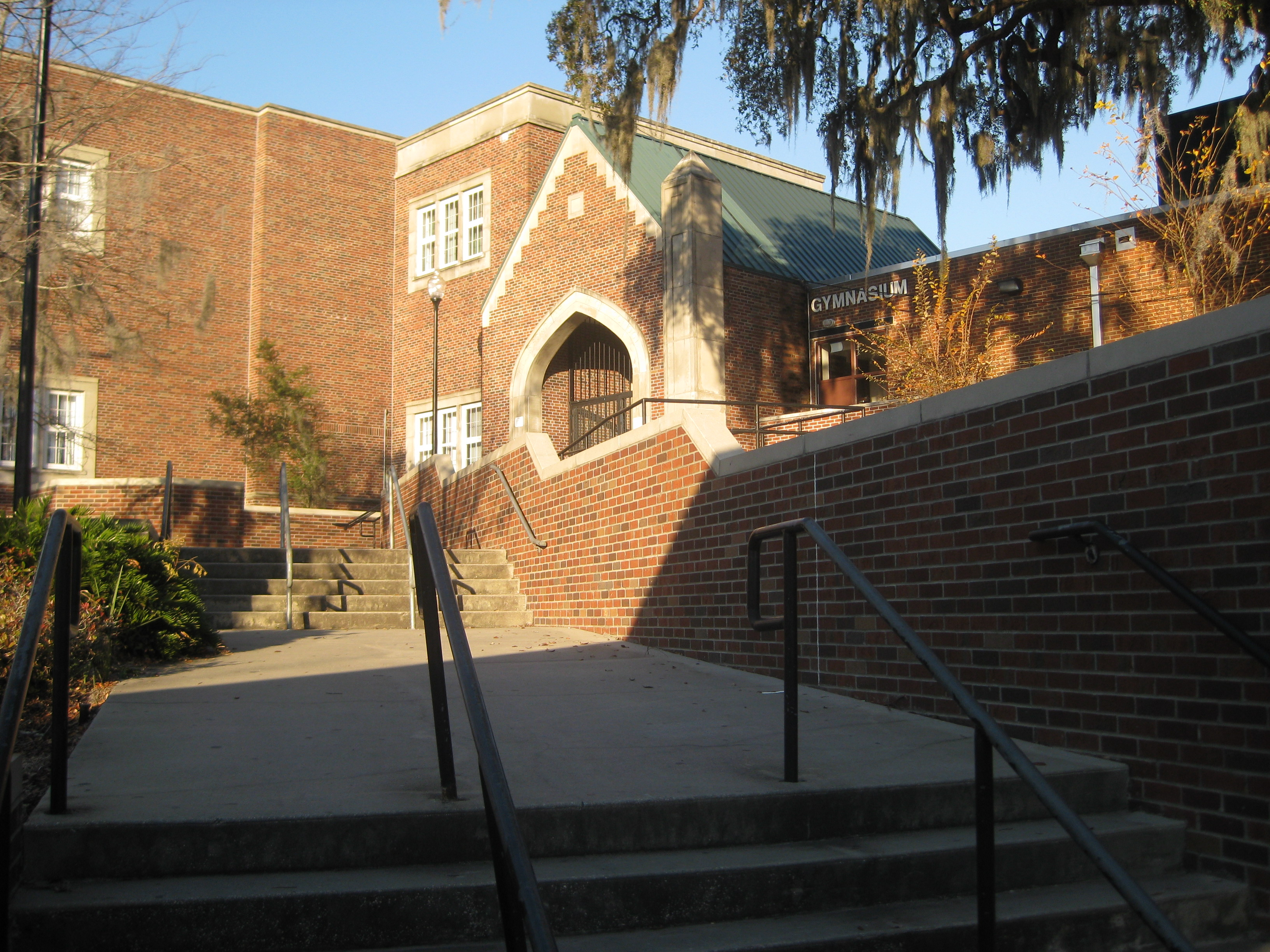
West (rear) entry to Hillsborough High School, next to the gymnasium.

In the mid-1970s, Hillsborough High went through a massive renovation. The school's students, faculty and staff were forced to temporarily move out and hold double session classes with other schools for the 1975-76 school year. . Hillsborough High 10th-grade students attended the afternoon session at George Washington Junior High at 2704 N. Highland Avenue, the same building originally built for HHS in 1911. 11th and 12th graders and staff were forced into the afternoon session at the new Thomas Jefferson High School at 4401 W. Cypress St until renovations of today's HHS building (built 1927–1928), were completed in 1976. The Class of 1977 was the first graduating class in the newly remodeled HHS Campus.

In 1979, HHS students had to pay for the chimes in the HHS clock tower. In 1980, a plaque was donated by the class of 1980, and mounted over the doorway leading to the inner courtyard from the trophy case area of the main building dedicated to the classes of the 1980s and "the Decade of New Ideas." During the early 1980s, HHS's student population swelled to over 3,000 students, spanning two campuses, referred to as North and South Campuses. HHS's South Campus included all of the buildings which now comprise Memorial Middle School, adjacent to HHS on its south side.

In the mid-1980s, the Alumni Building, commonly referred to as the 400 Hall, was added to the school. In around 1995, another addition was made, the 500 Building/English Hall, in which most 10th grade homerooms and English classes are housed.

On May 3, 2008, HHS completed renovations to restore the high school to its pre-1960s luster, when it reopened its newly named gymnasium. In 2005, many classes were forced into portable classrooms during the renovation. The major improvements to HHS were divided between maintenance and restoration.

== Ethnicity and demographics ==
Student Demographics: Hillsborough High School serves a multi-ethnic school population that currently consists of 1956 students from a diverse, rich historical community.

Percentage of students	Student ethnicity
39%	Hispanic or Latino
29%	Black (African American), Non Hispanic
19%	White (Caucasian), Non Hispanic
11%	American Native / Asian / Multi-Racial
100%	1956 Total

== Athletics ==
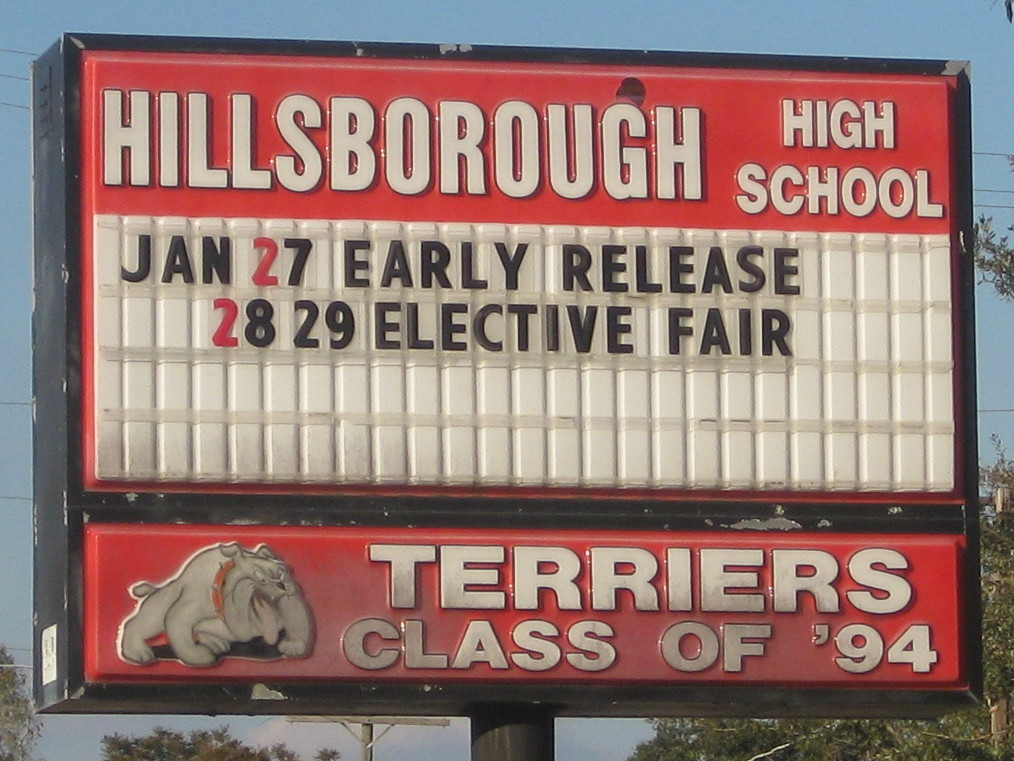
Sign at southeast corner of campus.

Hillsborough High has several sports teams, including football, baseball, girls flag football, boys and girls basketball, boys and girls track and field, boys and girls cross country, boys and girls soccer, boys and girls tennis, boys and girls swimming and diving, boys and girls golf, boys wrestling, and girls volleyball. There used to be boys decathlon and girls pentathlon, but the sport was discontinued by the FHSAA.

=== Football ===
The first football team was in 1907. Football was the first competitive high school sport played in Florida. The five schools in the initial football league were Duval (Jacksonville), Hillsborough (Tampa), Ocala, Orlando and Summerlin Institute (Bartow). Only Hillsborough still exists. The FHSAA – Florida High School Athletic Association was not formed until 1920.

The Hillsborough Terriers football team's rivalry with Henry B. Plant High School Panthers began in 1928 and is the oldest rivalry among Tampa Bay's high schools. Games used to be played on Thanksgiving Day (aka. the "Turkey Day Game") with an incredible local turnout of thousands of spectators. The "Turkey Day" tradition between Hillsborough and Plant High came to end in 1974. The Terriers "Turkey Day" record against Plant was 25-14. Before 1928, Hillsborough's biggest rivals were St. Pete and Duval.

The team's football stadium is named after Marcelino Huerta. The field was named Gaither Field for Principal Vivian Gaither, when Gaither High School was opened in Tampa.

On Friday, August 31, 2007, the Hillsborough High School football team celebrated its 100th anniversary season opener with a 43–20 victory over Jefferson High School.

==== Coaches ====
- James L. Orr 1915
- Ray Parmely 1920–1921
- Henry Freeman 1922
- George B. Sparkman, Jr. 1923
- W. E. Snipes 1924
- Herb Covington 1925
- Nash Higgins 1926
- Willard Johnson 1927–1936
- Walter Burrell 1937–1938
- Spurgeon Cherry 1939–1941
- J. Crockett Farnell 1942–1948
- Ty Smith 1949–1951
- Bill Justice 1952
- Bill Graeber 1953–1955
- Hal Griffin 1956–1960
- Bernie Wilson 1961–1967
- Billy Turner 1968–1972; 1976–1978
- Al Barnes 1973–1975
- Dan Sikes 1979–1983
- Dick O'Brien 1984–1992
- Earl Garcia 1993–present

==== State titles ====
The team won the state championship in 1910, 1912*, 1914, 1919, 1926, 1927, 1928, 1929**, 1935, 1942, 1945, 1946, 1948.

The 1913 team included Rex Farrior, Rammy Ramsdell, and Rondo Hatton. The team was the runner-up to Lakeland in 1923, with a team that featured Dutch Stanley and Speedy Walker. The 1926 team included Carlos Proctor and Jimmy Steele. In 1929, Hillsborough won the high school national football championship.

=== Baseball ===
The team won the state championship in 1935, 1937, and 1967 (2A). In 1913 and 1914, Hillsborough's basketball and baseball teams defeated teams from the University of Florida and Southern College.

=== Basketball ===
The 2008 renovations included a new gymnasium. Hillsborough High's gym had previously been famously and affectionately known to students and alums as the Big Red Barn (more commonly The Barn) probably due in part to its architectural design: its steep "skylighted" roof and red brick facade cause the gym to resemble a barn from a distance. "The Barn" was known for being a hostile environment for Terrier opponents to compete in, for the HHS student body seldom stood for anything short of winning. "The Barn" was one of the harshest gyms in the county to play in, as there was no air conditioning in it for many years. That, coupled with the loud fans and the many talented Terrier teams opposing schools had to face made "the Barn" a very difficult place to come out of with a win, much to the delight of generations of Hillsborough fans.

On May 3, 2008, a ceremony was held in Hillsborough High's newly remodeled gym to dedicate the gym, naming it the Don Williams Athletic Center, in honor of former HHS boys basketball coach Don Williams, who led the Terriers to a 2A state championship in 1959. Coach Williams went on to become the first South Florida Bulls men's basketball coach in 1970–71. Coach Williams was notified of the dedication prior to his death in February 2008.

The boys team won the state championships in 1924, 1947 (A), and 1959 (2A).

=== Track and field ===
The boys track and field won the team state championship in 1916, 1929, 1949 (A), and 1950 (A).

=== Boys Decathlon and Girls Pentathlon ===
The boys decathlon won the state team championships in 1981 (4A), 1982 (4A), and 1983 (4A). The girls pentathlon won the state team championships in 1982 (4A) and 1983 (4A).

=== Golf ===
The golf team won the state team championships in 1928 and 1934.

=== Swimming/Diving ===
The boys swim and dive team won the state team championship in 1946.

Swim Coaches:

Ana Cooper - 2023–present

== Notable alumni ==
- Kevin Abrams – CB (NFL)
- Azeez Al-Shaair – Linebacker for the Houston Texans
- Aric Almirola – NASCAR Cup Series driver
- Braulio Alonso – former president of the National Education Association, first elected in 1966.
- Jose Alvarez – former MLB pitcher with the Atlanta Braves, HHS Class of 74, inducted in HHS Hall of Fame in 2008 and Louisiana Lafayette Athletic Hall of Fame in 2019
- Richard Barone — recording artist, producer, and author; frontman of The Bongos.
- Charles Edward Bennett – former U.S. Representative elected as a Democrat to the Eighty-first and to the twenty-one succeeding Congresses (January 3, 1949 – January 3, 1993)
- Juran Bolden – CB (NFL/CFL); a former Tampa Bay Buccaneer
- Bob Bondi —Hillsborough County commissioner, Tampa city councilor, candidate in the 1979 Tampa mayoral election —class of 1952
- Joe Bondi — academic and former mayor of Temple Terrace, Florida (1974–78) —class of 1954
- Anthony Brown – NFL cornerback for the Dallas Cowboys
- Ann Turner Cook – the Gerber Baby, taught Writing and Literature at HHS, from 1966 until she retired. She is now a mystery author.
- Maurice Crum – former NFL football linebacker
- Chris Davis – RB (Syracuse, NFL)
- Elijah Dukes – OF; Washington Nationals
- Tim Elko – 1B; Chicago White Sox
- Carl Everett – CF/DH; member of the 2005 World Series Champion Chicago White Sox
- Rex Farrior
- Charley Hughlett – LS (NFL) Cleveland Browns
- Jarred Fayson – WR (NFL) New England Patriots
- Don Garlits – three-time World Champion NHRA Top Fuel drag racer.
- Cesar Gonzmart – concert violinist/concertmaster of the Symphony Orchestra of Havana, Spanish nobleman and chairman of the board, of $42 million, Columbia Restaurant Group (1991).
- Dwight Gooden – P; 1984 NL Rookie of the Year, 1985 NL Cy Young Award, member of 1986 World Series Champion New York Mets and both the 1996 and 2000 World Series Champion New York Yankees
- Angus R. Goss – USMC Gunner, killed in action during World War II, awarded the Navy Cross and the Conspicuous Gallantry Medal (UK). The USS Goss (DE-444) and the Angus Goss Memorial Pool (used by the school's swim teams) were named in his memory.
- Dick A. Greco (D) – 50th & 56th Mayor (1967–1974 and 1995–2003)
- Nigel Harris, American football player
- Rondo Hatton – "Fright Film" Star (...a.k.a. "the Creeper")
- Mike Heath – C/Utility; member of the 1978 World Series Champion New York Yankees
- Marcelino "Chelo" Huerta – Head football coach, University of Tampa (1952–1961), Wichita State University (1962–1964), and Parsons College (1965–1967); first Hispanic coach elected to College Football Hall of Fame (2002) (104–53–2 overall, a .660 winning percentage)
- Khia – rapper, expelled in ninth grade
- Steve Kiner – LB (NFL)
- Erriyon Knighton - Olympic sprinter
- Edward Barna Kurjack – anthropologist
- Lindsey Lamar – CFL
- Julian Lane – (D) 48th Mayor (1959-1963), member of the Florida House of Representatives (1970–72) and Florida State Senator (1972-76).
- Fred Lasswell – cartoonist/writer of "Barney Google and Snuffy Smith"
- Baldomero Lopez, 1st Lt. USMC – Posthumously awarded the Medal of Honor, he was the first casualty of the Korean War.
- Vance Lovelace RP; California Angels, drafted by Chicago Cubs as a 1st round (16th pick), of the 1981 amateur draft.
- Sumter de Leon Lowry Jr., Insurance executive, National Guard officer, segregationist political candidate.
- Rodney Mazion, American football and baseball player
- Gene Nelson Pitcher for the Oakland Athletics baseball team.
- Andrew Owens – Florida Twelfth Judicial District Circuit Court Judge, appointed in 1983 by Florida Gov. Bob Graham (D), served as Chief Judge in the late 1990s. Owens is a former UF basketball star.
- Al Pardo – C; Baltimore Orioles (attended HHS, graduated from Jefferson HS)
- William F. Poe – (R) 53rd Mayor (1974–79)
- Carlos Proctor
- Rammy Ramsdell
- Chris Ray – RP; Baltimore Orioles
- J.R. Reed – S/KR (NFL); member of the 2004 Philadelphia Eagles team that played in Super Bowl XXXIX.
- Frank Sanchez – Undersecretary for International Trade at the United States Department of Commerce in the Obama Administration.; formerly, a White House aide and Assistant Secretary of the U.S. Department of Transportation in the Clinton Administration
- Gary Sheffield IF; member of the 1997 World Series Champion Florida Marlins In 2009, reached 500th home run milestone.
- Shannon Snell – OG (NFL)
- Dennis K. "Dutch" Stanley – Head football coach, University of Florida (1934–1936); founding dean, University of Florida College of Health and Human Performance (1946–1970).
- Jimmy Steele
- Speedy Walker
- Slim Whitman – internationally renowned American Country singer, has a star on the Hollywood Walk of Fame
- Andrew Williams – DE (NFL)
- Angus Williams
- Floyd Youmans-P; Montreal Expos
