= Harold Sebring =

American judge (1898–1968)

Harold L. Sebring
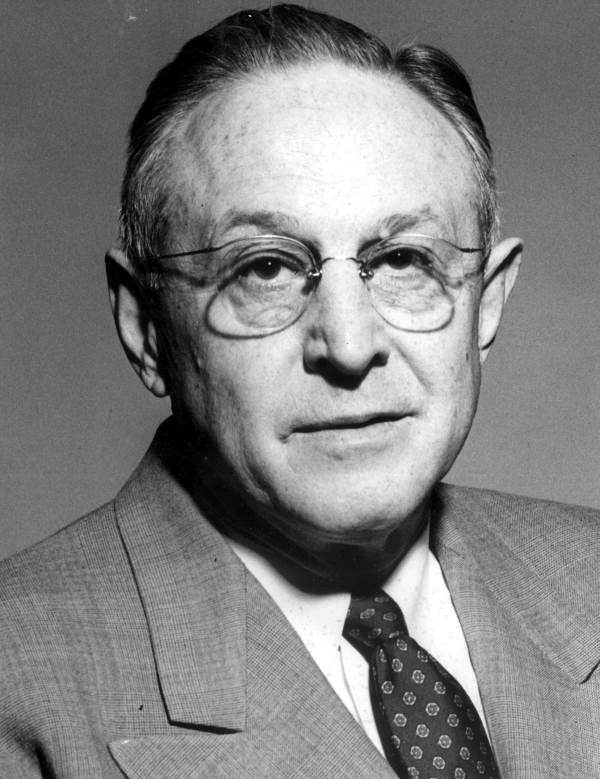

Justice of the Florida Supreme Court
- In office 1943–1955
- Preceded by: James B. Whitfield
- Succeeded by: B. Campbell Thornal

Judge at the Nuremberg Doctors' Trial
- In office 1946–1947

Personal details
- Born: March 9, 1898 Olathe, Kansas, U.S.
- Died: July 26, 1968 (aged 70) St. Petersburg, Florida, U.S.
- Party: Democratic
- Profession: Coach, Attorney

Harold Leon Sebring (March 9, 1898 – July 26, 1968), nicknamed Tom Sebring, was a Florida Supreme Court justice, and an American judge at one of the Subsequent Nuremberg Trials of German war criminals after World War II. Sebring was a native of Kansas and an alumnus of Kansas State Agricultural College. While Sebring attended law school at the University of Florida, he also served as the head coach of the Florida Gators football team that represented the university.

== Early life ==
Sebring was born in Olathe, Kansas in 1898, the son of John Thomas Sebring and Anna Lee Hayden Sebring. He graduated from Gardner High School in Gardner, Kansas in 1916, along with his brother, Leonard Sebring.

== World War I ==
Sebring spent 22 months overseas and thirteen months in combat during World War I, and was twice decorated by the U.S. Army with the Silver Star for exceptional bravery under enemy fire, and also received the Croix de Guerre and Corde de Fourragere from the French government. Sebring was honorably discharged from the Army as a sergeant in 1919.

== College ==
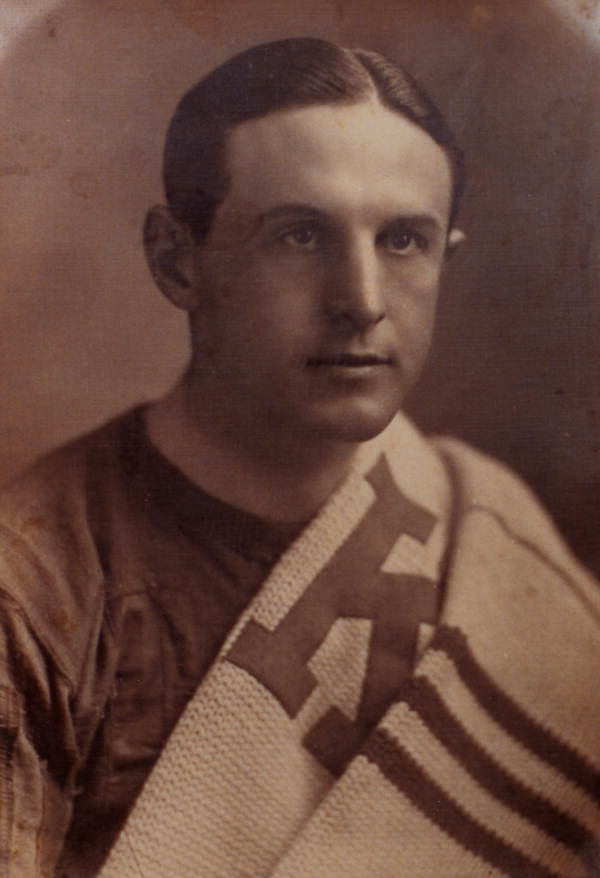
Student photo while at Kansas State.

After returning to the United States, he studied architecture, engineering and business at Kansas State Agricultural College (now known as Kansas State University) in Manhattan, Kansas, where he also excelled as a member of the Kansas State Aggies football, boxing and track & field teams. Sebring was an All Missouri Valley Conference football selection in 1921 and 1922 and, later, was named to the Kansas State Aggies All-Time Football Team. Sebring received a Bachelor of Science degree in commerce from Kansas State in 1923.

== Law school student and football coach ==
While playing football at Kansas State, one of Sebring's coaches was Captain James Van Fleet, a U.S. Army officer who was one of the college's Reserve Officer Training Corps (ROTC) instructors. Van Fleet joined the faculty at the University of Florida in Gainesville, Florida in 1921, and also became an assistant coach for the Florida Gators football team. When Van Fleet became the head coach of the Gators in 1923, he asked Sebring to join him in Gainesville as an assistant football coach and the head coach of the Florida Gators track and field and boxing teams. Sebring accepted the coaching position and also enrolled in the University of Florida College of Law as a student. When the Army transferred Van Fleet to a new posting in the Panama Canal Zone after the 1924 season, he recommended Sebring as his replacement, after serving as Van Fleet's chief scout in 1924. Sebring quickly proved himself to be a creative football coach and innovator; his 1925 Gators finished with an 8–2 record, the best record in school history to that time. Florida went 7–3 in 1927, Sebring's third and final season, and the team he recruited for 1928 finished 8–1 and led the nation in scoring. Sebring graduated with a Bachelor of Laws degree in 1928, and was later inducted into the University of Florida Athletic Hall of Fame as an "Honorary Letter Winner" and was tapped into Florida Blue Key leadership society.

== Lawyer and judge ==
After receiving his law degree, Sebring practiced law in Miami and Jacksonville, Florida. He was appointed judge for the Eight Judicial Circuit from 1933 to 1943 and served on the Florida Supreme Court from 1943 to 1955. After World War II, President Harry S. Truman appointed Sebring to sit on the bench for the Nuremberg Trials of Nazi war criminals, along with Walter B. Beals, Johnson T. Crawford, and Victor C. Swearingen. Sebring did not want to resign from the Florida Supreme Court and he was granted a leave of absence; the other justices appointed a new lower-court judge each month to serve in Sebring's place during his absence. While in Nuremberg in 1946 and 1947, Sebring was a judge on the Doctors' Trial, one of the Subsequent Nuremberg Trials. He returned to service on the Florida court, and was later elected chief justice by his colleagues, serving from 1951 to 1953.

== Law school dean ==
On September 1, 1955, Sebring retired from the Florida Supreme Court and was appointed as the dean of Stetson University College of Law, the first dean after the college moved from DeLand to Gulfport, Florida. Sebring was credited with dramatically expanding the student body and faculty, and deepening the quality and diversity of the college's academic courses. Sebring's retirement from Stetson was planned for September 1, 1968, but he died unexpectedly five weeks earlier. In 1976, Stetson named a law school courtroom in his memory; and, in 2004, the college named him as one of the first seventeen members of its hall of fame.

== Family and death ==
Sebring was married to Elise Bishop and had one child, son Harold, Jr. Sebring's grandson, Harold, III, leads a Tampa law firm, Sebring Law. Sebring died on July 26, 1968, in St. Petersburg, Florida.

== Head coaching record ==
=== Football ===
Year	Team	Overall	Conference	Standing	Bowl/playoffs
Florida Gators (Southern Conference) (1925–1927)
1925	Florida	8–2	3–2	8th	
1926	Florida	2–6–2	1–4–1	19th	
1927	Florida	7–3	5–1	6th	
Florida:		17–11–2	9–7–1		
Total:		17–11–2			

== See also ==
- List of Kansas State University people
- List of Levin College of Law graduates
- List of University of Florida alumni
- List of University of Florida Athletic Hall of Fame members
- List of University of Florida honorary degree recipients

Political offices
Preceded by James B. Whitfield	Justice of the Supreme Court of Florida; 1943–1955	Succeeded by B. Campbell Thornal
