= Charlie Bachman =

American football player and coach (1892–1985)

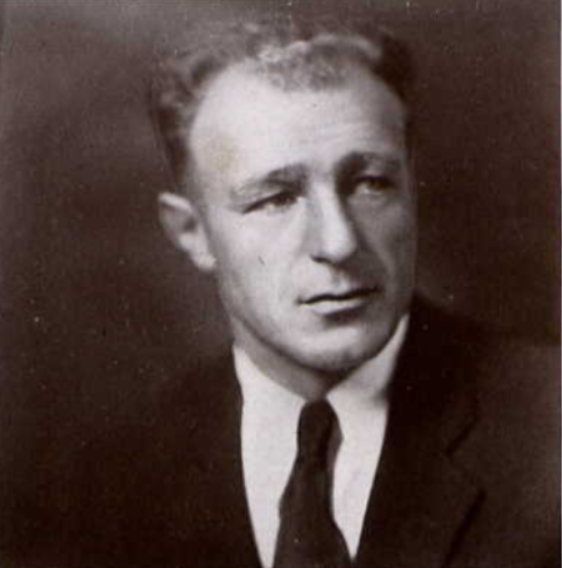
- Bachman from 1931 Seminole yearbook

Biographical details
- Born: December 1, 1892; Chicago, Illinois, U.S.
- Died: December 14, 1985 (aged 93); Port Charlotte, Florida, U.S.

Playing career
- 1914–1916: Notre Dame
- 1918: Great Lakes Navy
- Positions: Guard, center, fullback

Coaching career (HC unless noted)
- 1919: Northwestern
- 1920–1927: Kansas State
- 1928–1932: Florida
- 1933–1942: Michigan State
- 1943: Camp Grant
- 1944–1946: Michigan State
- 1953: Hillsdale

Administrative career (AD unless noted)
- 1919–1920: Northwestern
- 1928–1930: Florida

Head coaching record
- Overall: 137–83–24
- Bowls: 0–1

Accomplishments and honors

Awards
- Second-team All-American (1916); All-Western (1916); Kansas State Hall of Fame (1995)
- College Football Hall of Fame; Inducted in 1978 (profile)

Charles William Bachman Jr. (December 1, 1892 – December 14, 1985) was an American college football player and coach. Bachman was an Illinois native and an alumnus of the University of Notre Dame, where he played football. He served as the head football coach of Northwestern University, Kansas State Agricultural College, the University of Florida, Michigan State College, and Hillsdale College Bachman was inducted into the College Football Hall of Fame as a coach in 1978.

== Early life and education ==
Bachman was born in Chicago, in 1892. He received his high school education at Englewood High School in Chicago, where he was standout athlete in football and track and field. Bachman attended the University of Notre Dame from 1914 to 1916, and played for the Notre Dame Fighting Irish football team alongside Knute Rockne. He was named an All-American at guard in 1916, making Walter Camp's second team. Bachman briefly held the world record in the discus throw during the spring of 1917, and spent the 1917 fall season helping to coach the football team at DePauw University. In 1918, Bachman returned to the field, playing center for the legendary U.S. Navy team at Great Lakes Naval Station. The Great Lakes team posted a 7–0–2 record; it beat Navy, Illinois and Purdue, tied Bachman's former Notre Dame team, and defeated Mare Island Marine Base in the Rose Bowl. His Great Lakes teammates included Paddy Driscoll and George Halas.

== Coaching career ==
In 1919, at age 26, Bachman began his head coaching career at Northwestern University in Evanston, Illinois. Bachman brought a number of former players returning from World War I military service to Northwestern, but his team posted a disappointing 2–5 record. He moved on to Kansas State Agricultural College in Manhattan, Kansas following this season, and the losing record proved to be an aberration; from 1920 to 1927, Bachman posted a record of 33–23–9 at Kansas State. In 1924, Bachman's K-State team beat the University of Kansas for the first time in eighteen years. Bachman coached Kansas State's first All-American, and under his leadership the school also permanently returned to its former nickname of Wildcats and began using a live bobcat as a mascot.

Bachman accepted the head coaching position at the University of Florida in Gainesville, Florida in 1928, where he posted an 8–1 record his first season, the best in the Florida Gators' history up to that time. The 1928 Gators' sole loss came in their final game of the season, a 13–12 upset by Robert Neyland's 8–0–1 Tennessee Volunteers in Knoxville. While at Florida, Bachman coached the Gators' first first-team All-American, Hall of Fame end Dale Van Sickel, in 1928 and 1929. He also led the 1929 Gators in their first major intersectional match-up, a "neutral site" game in Miami against John McEwan's 7–2 Oregon Ducks football team, with the Gators coming away with the 20–6 victory. Bachman's first two seasons with the Gators were his most successful, but he continued to lead the Gators Eleven for five seasons, posting an overall record of 27–18–3. Dashwood Hicks, a lineman for the Gators in 1928, said "I've never seen a man eat and sleep football like Bachman. He couldn't sit down and talk without drawing plays or something."

Bachman left Florida to become the head football coach of Michigan State College in East Lansing, Michigan, coaching from 1933 to 1942 and from 1944 to 1946. Similar to the situation he inherited at Kansas State, Michigan State had not beaten the University of Michigan for eighteen years (1916–1933), but under Bachman, Michigan State defeated Michigan four consecutive seasons (1934–1937). Bachman's overall record at Michigan State was 70–34–10. His Spartan teams were also notable because he outfitted them in gold and black uniforms instead of the official school colors of green and white.

In 1953, Bachman was named the head football coach at Hillsdale College in Hillsdale, Michigan. He held that position for one season, posting a record of 5–3–2.

== Honors and death ==
Bachman was inducted into the University of Florida Athletic Hall of Fame as an "honorary letter winner" in 1971, and later, the College Football Hall of Fame in 1978. He died in Port Charlotte, Florida in 1985; he was 93 years old. Bachman was survived by his wife Grace and their three sons, including noted software engineer Charles W. Bachman.

== Head coaching record ==
Year	Team	Overall	Conference	Standing	Bowl/playoffs
Northwestern Purple (Big Ten Conference) (1919)
1919	Northwestern	2–5	1–4	T–7th	
Northwestern:		2–5	1–4		
Kansas State Wildcats (Missouri Valley Conference) (1920–1927)
1920	Kansas State	3–3–3	0–3–1	8th	
1921	Kansas State	5–3	4–2	T–2nd	
1922	Kansas State	5–1–2	3–1–2	3rd	
1923	Kansas State	4–2–2	2–2–2	5th	
1924	Kansas State	3–4–1	1–4–1	8th	
1925	Kansas State	5–2–1	3–2–1	T–3rd	
1926	Kansas State	5–3	2–2	T–6th	
1927	Kansas State	3–5	2–4	8th	
Kansas State:		33–23–9	17–20–7		
Florida Gators (Southern Conference) (1928–1932)
1928	Florida	8–1	6–1	3rd	
1929	Florida	8–2	6–1	4th	
1930	Florida	6–3–1	4–2–1	7th	
1931	Florida	2–6–2	2–4–2	15th	
1932	Florida	3–6	1–6	20th	
Florida:		27–18–3	19–14–3		
Michigan State Spartans (Independent) (1933–1942)
1933	Michigan State	4–2–2			
1934	Michigan State	8–1			
1935	Michigan State	6–2			
1936	Michigan State	6–1–2			
1937	Michigan State	8–2			L Orange
1938	Michigan State	6–3			
1939	Michigan State	4–4–1			
1940	Michigan State	3–4–1			
1941	Michigan State	5–3–1			
1942	Michigan State	4–3–2			
Camp Grant Warriors (Independent) (1943)
1943	Camp Grant	2–6–2			
Camp Grant:		2–6–2			
Michigan State Spartans (Independent) (1944–1946)
1944	Michigan State	6–1			
1945	Michigan State	5–3–1			
1946	Michigan State	5–5			
Michigan State:		70–34–10			
Hillsdale Dales (Michigan Intercollegiate Athletic Association) (1953)
1953	Hillsdale	5–3–2			
Hillsdale:		5–3–2			
Total:		137–83–24			

== See also ==
- List of College Football Hall of Fame inductees (coaches)
- List of University of Florida Athletic Hall of Fame members
- List of University of Notre Dame alumni
- List of University of Notre Dame athletes
