= 1966 Florida Gators football team =

American college football season

1966 Florida Gators football
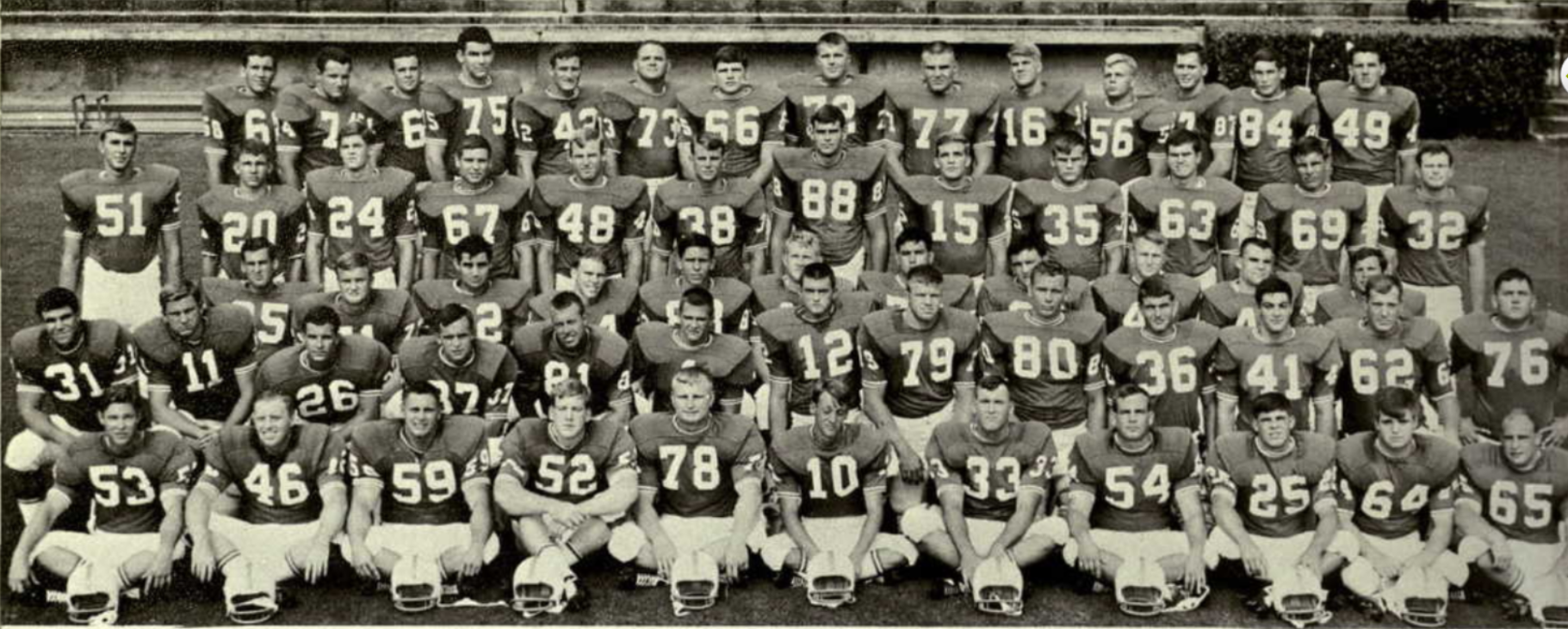

Orange Bowl champion

Orange Bowl, W 27–12 vs. Georgia Tech
- Conference: Southeastern Conference

Ranking
- Coaches: No. 11
- Record: 9–2 (5–1 SEC)
- Head coach: Ray Graves (7th season)
- Offensive coordinator: Ed Kensler (2nd season)
- Defensive coordinator: Gene Ellenson (3rd season)
- Captains: Jerry Anderson; Bill Carr
- Home stadium: Florida Field

1966 Southeastern Conference football standings
	Conf.					Overall
Team	W		L		T	W		L		T
No. 3 Alabama +	6	–	0	–	0	11	–	0	–	0
No. 4 Georgia +	6	–	0	–	0	10	–	1	–	0
Florida	5	–	1	–	0	9	–	2	–	0
Ole Miss	5	–	2	–	0	8	–	3	–	0
Tennessee	4	–	2	–	0	8	–	3	–	0
LSU	3	–	3	–	0	5	–	4	–	1
Kentucky	2	–	4	–	0	3	–	6	–	1
Auburn	1	–	5	–	0	4	–	6	–	0
Mississippi State	0	–	6	–	0	2	–	8	–	0
Vanderbilt	0	–	6	–	0	1	–	9	–	0
+ – Conference co-champions; Georgia's game against North Carolina; Florida, LSU, and Vanderbilt's games against Tulane; and Tennessee's game against South Carolina counted in the conference standings.; Rankings from AP Poll

The 1966 Florida Gators football team represented the University of Florida in the sport of American football during the 1966 NCAA University Division football season. The Gators competed in the University Division of the National Collegiate Athletic Association (NCAA) and the Southeastern Conference (SEC). In their seventh season under head coach Ray Graves, the Gators compiled an overall win–loss record of 9–2 with a mark of 5–1 in conference play, placing third among the SEC's ten teams. Led by quarterback Steve Spurrier, the Gators outscored their opponents by a combined total of 265 to 147 and concluded their 1966 season with a 27–12 victory over the Georgia Tech Yellow Jackets in the 1967 Orange Bowl. The Gators were not ranked in the final AP Poll, but finished No. 11 in the final UPI Coaches Poll.

Spurrier won the 1966 Heisman Trophy and was the unanimous first-team quarterback on the 1966 All-America Team. He completed 179 of 291 passes for 2,012 yards and 16 touchdowns with eight interceptions. Tailback Larry Smith was the team's leading rusher with 742 yards and nine touchdowns on 162 carries. Smith was also selected as the most valuable player in the 1967 Orange Bowl after setting two Orange Bowl records with 187 rushing yards and a 94-yard touchdown run. Finally, flanker Richard Trapp set a new team record with 63 catches during the 1966 season.

In addition to Spurrier, center Bill Carr was the team's only other first-team All-American, receiving first-team honors from Time magazine and The Sporting News. Five Gators received first-team honors from either the Associated Press (AP) or United Press International (UPI) on the 1966 All-SEC football team. Carr, Smith, Spurrier and Trapp were consensus first-team picks by both the AP and UPI, while guard Jim Benson took first-team honors from the UPI and second-team honors from the AP.

To date, this is the last season in which the Gators did not play rival Kentucky.

== Schedule ==
Date	Opponent	Rank	Site	TV	Result	Attendance
September 17	Northwestern*		Florida Field; Gainesville, FL		W 43–7	40,056
September 24	Mississippi State		Florida Field; Gainesville, FL		W 28–7	49,333
October 1	at Vanderbilt		Dudley Field; Nashville, TN		W 13–0	16,522
October 8	at Florida State*	No. 10	Doak Campbell Stadium; Tallahassee, FL (rivalry)		W 22–19	46,698
October 15	at NC State*	No. 8	Carter Stadium; Raleigh, NC		W 17–10	41,378
October 22	at LSU	No. 8	Tiger Stadium; Baton Rouge, LA (rivalry)		W 28–7	67,500
October 29	Auburn^{†}	No. 7	Florida Field; Gainesville, FL (rivalry)		W 30–27	60,511
November 5	vs. Georgia	No. 7	Gator Bowl Stadium; Jacksonville, FL (rivalry)		L 10–27	62,820
November 12	Tulane (Note: Florida's game against Tulane counted in the SEC standings.)		Florida Field; Gainesville, FL		W 31–10	45,102
November 26	Miami (FL)*	No. 9	Florida Field; Gainesville, FL (rivalry)		L 16–21	59,211
January 2, 1967	vs. No. 8 Georgia Tech*		Miami Orange Bowl; Miami, FL (Orange Bowl)	NBC	W 27–12	72,426
*Non-conference game; ^{†}Homecoming; Rankings from AP Poll released prior to the game

== Before the season ==
The 1965 Florida team compiled a 7–4 record and finished in third place in the SEC. Quarterback Steve Spurrier returned to the 1966 team, but his two leading receivers, Charles Casey (58 catches in 1965) and Barry Brown (33 catches in 1965), were lost to graduation. Before the season began, head coach Ray Graves noted: "This team has to be a question mark. I don't know what type of football team we have."

== Game summaries ==
=== Game 1: Northwestern ===
Game 1: Northwestern at Florida

Team	1	2	3	4	Total
Northwestern	0	0	7	0	7
• Florida	7	10	9	17	43

- Date: September 17
- Location: Florida Field
  Gainesville, Florida
- Game attendance: 40,056

The Gators opened their 1966 season on September 17, with a 43–7 victory over the Northwestern Wildcats at Florida Field. Quarterback Steve Spurrier passed for 219 yards and three touchdowns and kicked two field goals in the game. Receiver Richard Trapp caught two touchdown passes (19 and 53 yards) and Ealdsen caught another (10 yards). Back-up quarterback Harmon Wages also scored on a 25-yard run. Preston also scored on a 15-yard pass from Kay Stephenson. In all, Florida gained 506 yards of total offense, 206 rushing and 302 passing.

=== Game 2: Mississippi State ===
Game 2: Mississippi State at Florida

Team	1	2	3	4	Total
Miss. St.	0	7	0	0	7
• Florida	0	7	21	0	28

- Date: September 24
- Location: Florida Field
  Gainesville, Florida
- Game attendance: 49,333

On September 24, Florida won its second game of the season by a 28–7 score over Mississippi State. The game was played before a record crowd of 49,333 at Florida Field. The first half ended in a 7–7 tie, but the Gators scored three touchdowns in a seven-minute span in the third quarter. Quarterback Steve Spurrier threw two touchdown passes, a 16-yard pass to Jack Coons and a 13-yard pass to end Paul Ewaldsen. Florida's other touchdowns came on runs by Larry Smith and Harmon Wages. Three of Florida's four touchdowns were set up by interceptions of passes thrown by Mississippi State quarterback Don Saget.

=== Game 3: at Vanderbilt ===
Game 3: Florida at Vanderbilt

Team	1	2	3	4	Total
• Florida	0	7	6	0	13
Vanderbilt	0	0	0	0	0

- Date: October 1
- Location: Dudley Field
  Nashville, Tennessee
- Game attendance: 16,522

On October 1, Florida defeated the Vanderbilt Commodores by a 13–0 score at Dudley Field in Nashville, Tennessee. Both Florida touchdowns were the result of passes thrown by Steve Spurrier, a 22-yarder to Jack Coons in the second quarter and a five-yarder to Larry Smith in the third quarter.

=== Game 4: at Florida State ===
Game 4: Florida at Florida State

Team	1	2	3	4	Total
• Florida	7	7	0	8	22
Florida State	7	3	9	0	19

- Date: October 8
- Location: Doak Campbell Stadium
  Tallahassee, Florida
- Game attendance: 46,698

Scoring summary
1	11:00	FLA	Richard Trapp 35 yard pass from Steve Spurrier (John Barfield kick)	FLA 7–0
1	7:39	FSU	Jim Mankins 1 yard run (Pete Roberts kick)	Tied 7–7
2	5:31	FSU	Pete Roberts 27 yard field goal	FSU 10–7
2	0:48	FLA	Richard Trapp 6 yard pass from Steve Spurrier (John Barfield kick)	FLA 14–10
3	12:51	FSU	Jim Mankins 1 yard run (kick failed)	FSU 16–14
3	3:12	FSU	Pete Roberts 37 yard field goal	FSU 19–14
4	10:44	FLA	Larry Smith 41 yard pass from Steve Spurrier (Steve Spurrier to Richard Trapp pass)	FLA 22–14

On October 8, Florida defeated Florida State Seminoles by 22–19 at Doak Campbell Stadium in Tallahassee, Florida. Quarterback Steve Spurrier threw two touchdown passes to Richard Trapp in the first half, but Florida State scored nine points in the third quarter to take a 19–14 lead. In the fourth quarter, Spurrier threw a 41-yard touchdown pass to Larry Smith and then completed a pass to Richard Trapp for a two-point conversion to give the Gators a three-point lead. Late in the game, a Florida State receiver was ruled out of bounds when he caught a pass in the end zone; the Seminoles missed a 48-yard field goal attempt as time expired. Spurrier completed 16 of 24 passes for 219 yards and three touchdowns.

=== Game 5: at NC State ===
Game 5: Florida at NC State

Team	1	2	3	4	Total
• Florida	0	3	0	14	17
NC State	0	7	0	3	10

- Date: October 15
- Location: Carter–Finley Stadium
  Raleigh, North Carolina
- Game attendance: 41,378

On October 15, Florida came into its fifth game ranked No. 8 in the AP Poll and defeated North Carolina State by a 17–10 score at Carter–Finley Stadium in Raleigh, North Carolina. The victory marked the first time since 1928 that the Gators had won the first five games of a season. Early in the fourth quarter, North Carolina State kicked a field goal and led 10–3. The Gators then sustained a 74-yard drive and tied the game on a short touchdown run by Larry Smith. Shortly thereafter, linebacker Steve Heidt intercepted a pass on Florida's 23-yard line. Quarterback Steve Spurrier then led a 77-yard drive capped by a 31-yard touchdown pass to Richard Trapp.

=== Game 6: at LSU ===
Game 6: Florida at LSU

Team	1	2	3	4	Total
• Florida	7	14	7	0	28
LSU	0	0	0	7	7

- Date: October 22
- Location: Tiger Stadium
  Baton Rouge, Louisiana
- Game attendance: 67,500

On October 22, 1966, Florida defeated the LSU Tigers by a 28–7 score at Tiger Stadium in Baton Rouge, Louisiana. The Gators took a 21–0 lead at halftime on an eight-yard touchdown pass from Steve Spurrier to Larry Smith, a two-yard touchdown run by Smith, and a 13-yard touchdown pass from Spurrier to Richard Trapp. Fullback Graham McKeel also scored a touchdown on a short run in the third quarter. LSU did not score until the fourth quarter. Spurrier completed 17 of 25 passes for 208 yards and two touchdowns in the game.

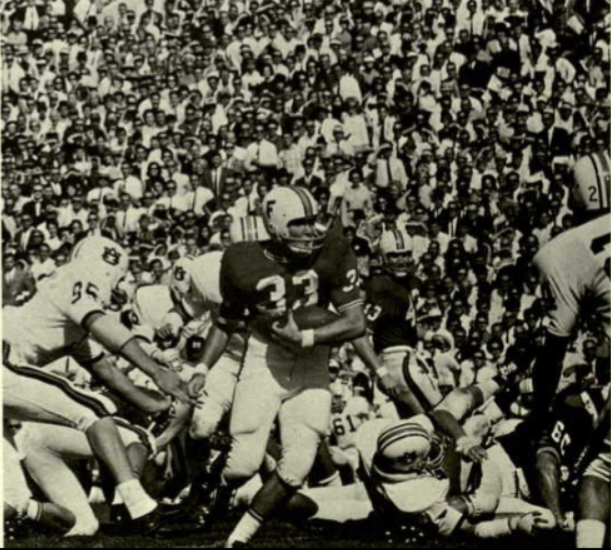
Larry Smith (33) vs. Auburn.

=== Game 7: Auburn ===
Game 7: Auburn at Florida

Team	1	2	3	4	Total
Auburn	7	10	3	7	27
• Florida	7	6	7	10	30

- Date: October 29
- Location: Florida Field
  Gainesville, Florida
- Game attendance: 60,511

On October 29, the Gators won their seventh straight game, defeating coach Shug Jordan's Auburn Tigers before a record homecoming crowd at Florida Field by a 30–27 score, trading the lead back and forth all day. After Auburn fumbled the opening kickoff, quarterback Steve Spurrier threw a touchdown pass to Richard Trapp on the third play of the game. On the day, Spurrier completed 27 of 40 passes for 259 yards. Touchdowns also came on short runs from backs Graham McKeel and Larry Smith. Smith finished the day with 102 rushing yards on twenty-two carries, including a 53-yard run.

In the fourth quarter, Spurrier scored a touchdown on a quarterback sneak after a 71-yard drive. With the game tied at 27, Spurrier was engineering another late drive for the win, but was stopped at Auburn's 39-yard-line following an intentional grounding penalty. The distance was outside the usual range of the Gators regular placekicker Wayne "Shade tree" Barfield, but Spurrier had kicked 40-yard field goals in practice. He memorably waved off the kicker and booted the game-winning, 40-yard field goal.

Most believe this play eventually netted Spurrier the Heisman . "Steve Spurrier may own the patent for thrills in football after the 1966 season. Indeed, Spurrier proved he was every bit the calm, collected candidate for the Heisman Trophy." said Pat Parrish of the All Florida News.

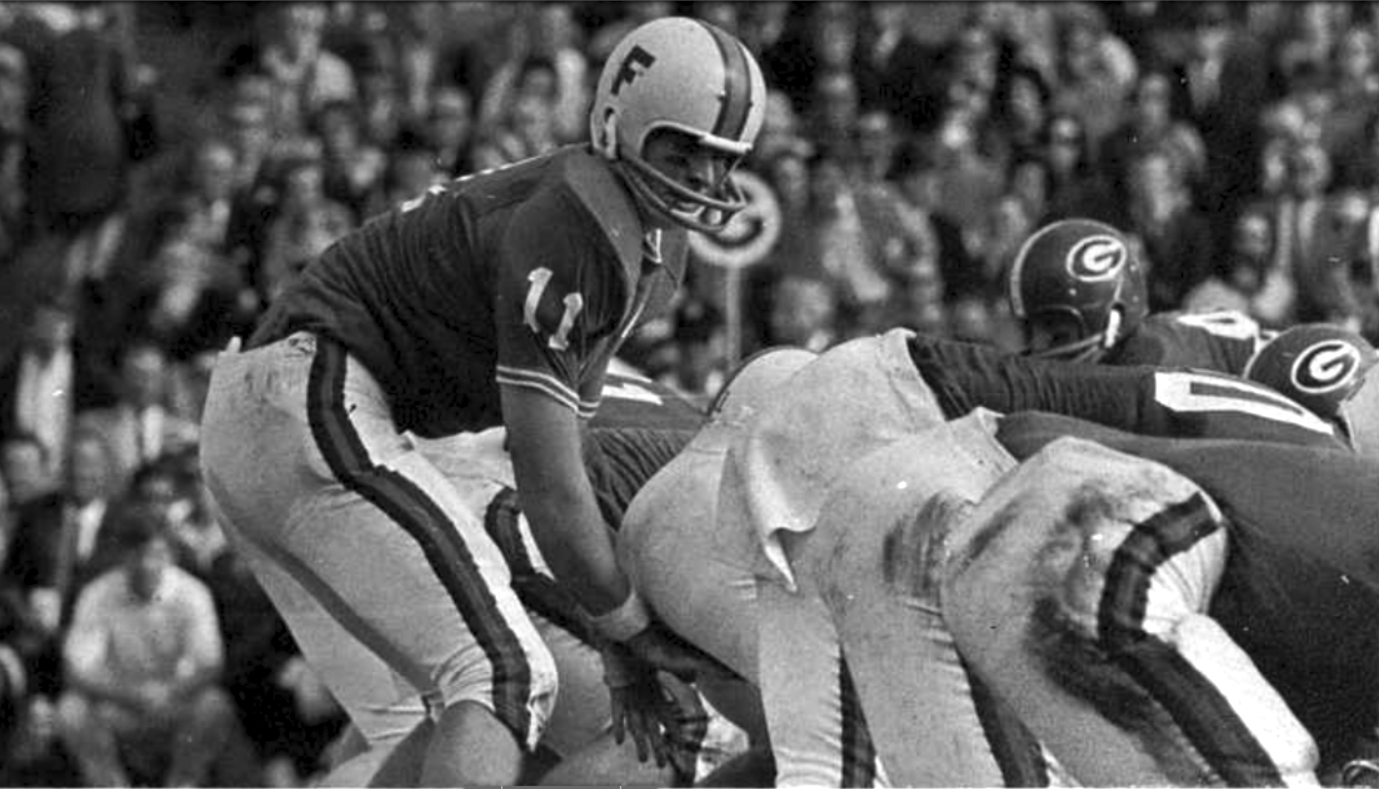
Spurrier (11) under center.

=== Game 8: vs. Georgia ===
Game 8: Georgia vs. Florida

Team	1	2	3	4	Total
• Georgia	3	0	7	17	27
Florida	7	3	0	0	10

- Date: November 5
- Location: Gator Bowl Stadium
  Jacksonville, Florida
- Game attendance: 62,820

On November 5, the Gators lost for the first time during the 1966 season, falling to the rival Georgia Bulldogs by a 27–10 score at Gator Bowl Stadium in Jacksonville, Florida. Florida was ranked No. 7 in the AP Poll prior to the game, and dropped out of the AP top 10 after the loss. Bulldogs running back Ron Jenkins led the attack for Georgia with 88 rushing yards and a touchdown on 20 carries.

External videos
- Georgia game highlights, YouTube video.

On their first possession, the Gators sustained an 86-yard scoring drive with fullback Graham McKeel scoring the touchdown. Thereafter, the Gators were limited to a field goal, as Georgia repeatedly blitzed Florida quarterback Steve Spurrier and held him to 16 of 29 passes for 133 yards.

=== Game 9: Tulane ===
Game 9: Tulane at Florida

Team	1	2	3	4	Total
Tulane	3	7	0	0	10
• Florida	7	3	7	14	31

- Date: November 12
- Location: Florida Field
  Gainesville, Florida
- Game attendance: 45,102

On November 12, Florida rebounded with a 31–10 victory over the Tulane Green Wave at Florida Field. Quarterback Steve Spurrier gained 282 yards of total offense in the game, breaking the SEC career total offense record. At the end of the game, Spurrier had a three-year total of 5,082 yards, surpassing Zeke Bratkowski's prior record of 4,824 yards from 1951 to 1953. Spurrier also set a new Florida single-season record with his 15th touchdown pass of the season. The game included an 83-yard punt return in the fourth quarter by Florida's George Grandy. Running back Larry Smith rushed for 93 yards on 26 carries.

=== Game 10: Miami (FL) ===
Game 10: Miami at Florida

Team	1	2	3	4	Total
• Miami	0	14	7	0	21
Florida	0	3	6	7	16

- Date: November 26
- Location: Florida Field
  Gainesville, Florida
- Game attendance: 59,211

On November 26, Florida concluded its regular season with a 21–16 loss to the Miami Hurricanes at Florida Field. Miami led 21–3 at one point in the third quarter. Quarterback Steve Spurrier, playing in his last home game, led a "desperate surge" that brought the Gators to within five points. He completed ten straight passes in one stretch and threw a touchdown pass to end Paul Ewaldsen late in the third quarter. Spurrier led another long drive in the fourth quarter that was capped by a touchdown run by Larry Smith. As time ran out, the Gators had advanced the ball to the Miami 30-yard line. In all, Spurrier completed 26 of 49 passes for 224 yards. Flanker Richard Trapp caught 11 passes and set a team record with 63 receptions during the 1966 season. After the game, coach Ray Graves announced that Spurrier's number 11 jersey would be permanently retired.

=== Georgia Tech—Orange Bowl ===
Orange Bowl

Team	1	2	3	4	Total
Georgia Tech	6	0	0	6	12
• Florida	0	7	7	13	27

- Date: January 2, 1967
- Location: Miami Orange Bowl
  Miami, Florida
- Game attendance: 72,426

On January 2, 1967, Florida defeated the Georgia Tech Yellow Jackets by a 27–12 score in the 33rd Orange Bowl game. Florida tailback Larry Smith carried the ball 23 times for 187 yards, including a 94-yard touchdown run in the third quarter while struggling to keep his pants up. He set Orange Bowl records for the most rushing yards in a game and for the longest run from scrimmage, and was selected as the game's most valuable player. Fullback Graham McKeel also scored two touchdowns, and the Florida defense intercepted four passes and recovered a fumble. Quarterback Steve Spurrier saw limited action due to a sore throwing arm, but still completed 14 of 30 passes for 160 yards. Backup quarterback Harmon Wages threw a touchdown pass to end Jack Coons. Florida coach Ray Graves called the game "the sweetest victory of my coaching career."

== Personnel ==
=== Roster ===
1966 Florida Gators roster
Quarterbacks: 11 Steve Spurrier^{F} – Sr.; 15 Kay Stephenson^{F} – Sr.; 16 Harmon Wages^{F} – Jr.; Halfbacks: 33 Larry Smith^{F} – So.; Fullbacks: 48 John W. Barfield^{F}; 43 F. Graham McKeel^{F}; Tight ends: 88 Jim Yarbrough^{F} – So.; 83 John D. "Jack" Coons^{F}; 85 Paul H. Ewaldsen^{F}; Wide receivers/Flankers: 44 Richard Trapp^{F} – Jr.	Tackles: 61 Eddie Foster; 66 Joseph D. Pasteris^{F}; 71 John H. Preston^{F}; Guards: 77 Guy Dennis^{F} – So.; 60 James E. Benson^{F}; 76 C. Paige Cutcliffe^{F}; 75 T. Douglas Splane^{F}; Centers: 51 Bill Carr^{F} – Sr.; 52 Bobby Adams; Defensive ends: 82 Donald J. Barrett^{F}; 87 D. Michael Santille^{F}	Defensive tackles/guards: 62 Jerry Anderson^{F} – Sr.; 78 George R. Dean^{F}; 69 William J. Dorsey^{F}; 74 Donald M. Giordano^{F}; 80 Brian L. Jetter^{F}; Linebackers: 7 Jack D. Card^{F}; 41 W. Steve Heidt^{F}; 38 Wayne C. McCall^{F}; 56 Charles Pippin^{F}; Defensive backs: 12 Bobby C. Downs^{F}; 26 S. George Grandy^{F}; 35 Chip Hinton; 36 Tom J. Hungerbuhler^{F}; 10 Larry Rentz^{F}; 81 Rex Von Rittgers^{F}	Unlisted: 34 Marquis C. Baeszler^{F}; 31 Floyd T. "Tom" Christian^{F}; John Cole^{F}; 70 Gordon W. "Wally" Colson^{F}; Nick Didio^{F}; 63 Gary J. Duven^{F}; 45 Donald O. Knapp^{F}; Joel Kruger^{F}; Doug Lamb^{F}; Phillip J. Maggio^{F}; Jack Mahood^{F}; Pat McCarron^{F}; 72 Terry E. Morris^{F}; Edwin R. Warner^{F}

Roster notes

- ^F 1966 Florida letterman
- ^Sr Senior
- ^Jr Junior
- ^So Sophomore

=== Coaching staff ===
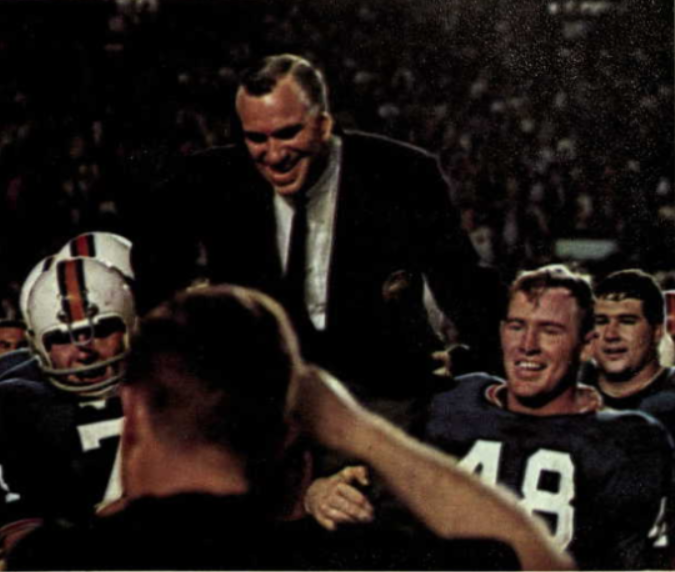
Graves is carried from the field by his players after 1967 Orange Bowl victory.

- Don Brown, defensive line
- Gene Ellenson, assistant head coach, head defensive coach
- Dave Fuller, B-team coach
- Ray Graves, head coach, athletic director
- Ed Kensler, head offensive coach, offensive line coach
- Billy Kinard, defensive backs coach
- Albert "Bubba" McGowan, offensive ends coach
- Fred Pancoast, offensive backfield coach
- Charles "Rabbit" Smith, head recruiter
- Jack Thompson, III, B-team coach
- Larry Travis, freshman team head coach

== After the season ==
=== Awards and honors ===
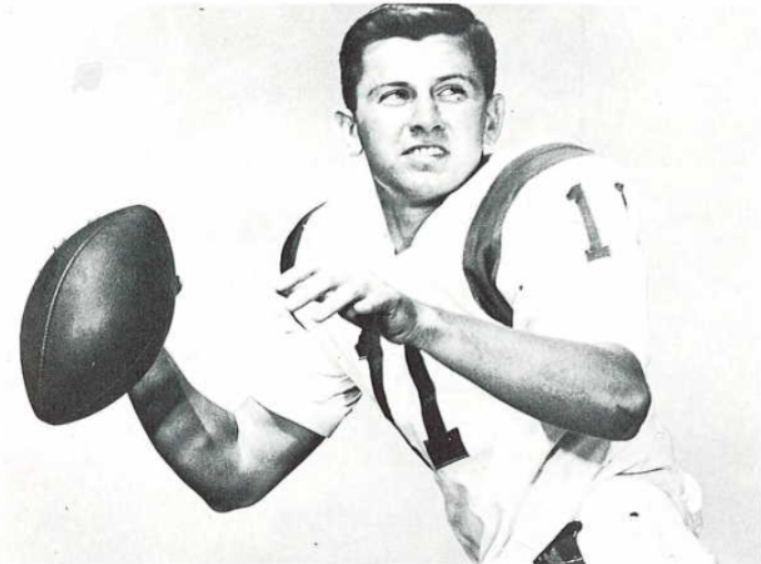
1966 Heisman Trophy winner Steve Spurrier.

In the post-season award season, Florida quarterback Steve Spurrier received numerous awards, including the following:

- On November 23, 1966, Spurrier was announced as the winner of the 1966 Heisman Trophy. Spurrier received 433 of 869 first place votes and 1,679 points, outpacing Purdue quarterback Bob Griese who garnered 184 first place votes and 816 points.
- Spurrier was recognized by the NCAA as the unanimous first-team quarterback on the 1966 All-America Team, having received first-team honors from the Associated Press (AP), United Press International (UPI), Newspaper Enterprise Association, Central Press Association, American Football Coaches Association, Football Writers Association of America, Time magazine, and The Sporting News.
- On December 3, 1966, Spurrier was selected by UPI as for its "back of the year" award. Spurrier received 137 of 327 possible votes, outpacing Bob Griese who finished second with 48 votes.
- On December 4, 1966, Spurrier was named the Sporting News College Football Player of the Year based on the votes of professional football scouts.

Florida center Bill Carr was the team's other first-team All-American, receiving first-team honors from Time magazine and The Sporting News. Five Gators received first-team All-SEC honors from either the AP or UPI on the 1966 All-SEC football team. Spurrier, Carr, running back Larry Smith, and flanker Richard Trapp were consensus first-team picks by both the AP and UPI, while guard Jim Benson took first-team honors from UPI and second-team honors from the AP.

=== NFL draft ===
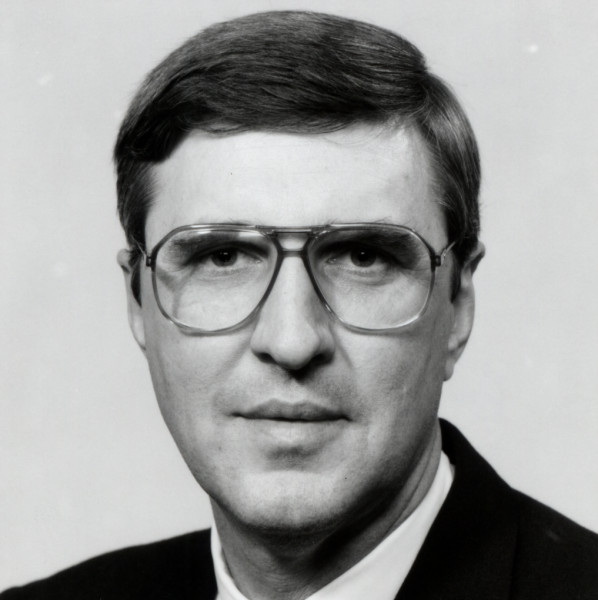
All-American center Bill Carr pictured in the 1990s

Ten players from the 1966 Florida team were either drafted to play or actually played in the National Football League (NFL). Four players were drafted into the league in the subsequent 1967 NFL/AFL draft. They are:

- Steve Spurrier – selected by the San Francisco 49ers with third overall pick, played for the 49ers (1967–1975) and Tampa Bay Buccaneers (1976);
- Bill Carr – selected by the New Orleans Saints with the 106th pick in the 1967 NFL Draft, signed with the Saints but did not make regular season roster after completing military service;
- Jim Benson – selected by the New Orleans Saints with the 264th pick in the 1967 NFL Draft, but did not appear in an NFL game;
- Kay Stephenson – undrafted in 1967, played for the San Diego Chargers (1967) and Buffalo Bills (1968).

== See also ==
- History of the University of Florida

== Bibliography ==
- 2015 Florida Gators Football Media Guide, University Athletic Association, Gainesville, Florida (2015).
- Carlson, Norm, University of Florida Football Vault: The History of the Florida Gators, Whitman Publishing, LLC, Atlanta, Georgia (2007). ISBN 0-7948-2298-3.
- Golenbock, Peter (2002). Go Gators! An Oral History of Florida's Pursuit of Gridiron Glory. St. Petersburg, Florida: Legends Publishing, LLC. ISBN 0-9650782-1-3.
- Hairston, Jack, Tales from the Gator Swamp: A Collection of the Greatest Gator Stories Ever Told, Sports Publishing, LLC, Champaign, Illinois (2002). ISBN 1-58261-514-4.
- McCarthy, Kevin M., Fightin' Gators: A History of University of Florida Football, Arcadia Publishing, Mount Pleasant, South Carolina (2000). ISBN 978-0-7385-0559-6.
- McEwen, Tom, The Gators: A Story of Florida Football, The Strode Publishers, Huntsville, Alabama (1974). ISBN 0-87397-025-X.
- Nash, Noel, ed., The Gainesville Sun Presents The Greatest Moments in Florida Gators Football, Sports Publishing, Inc., Champaign, Illinois (1998). ISBN 1-57167-196-X.
- Proctor, Samuel, & Wright Langley, Gator History: A Pictorial History of the University of Florida, South Star Publishing Company, Gainesville, Florida (1986). ISBN 0-938637-00-2.
