= Auburn–Florida football rivalry =

American college football rivalry

- Auburn Tigers Florida Gators
- First meeting: October 12, 1912; Auburn, 27–13
- Latest meeting: September 19, 2026; Florida, 44–39
- Next meeting: 2028

Statistics
- Total meetings: 85
- All-time series: Auburn leads, 43–40–2
- Largest victory: Auburn, 68–0 (1917)
- Longest win streak: Florida, 7 (1995–2000)
- Current win streak: Florida, 2 (2019–present)

Locations of Auburn and Florida

The Auburn–Florida football rivalry is an American college football rivalry between the Auburn Tigers football team of Auburn University and Florida Gators football team of the University of Florida which was first played in 1912. The schools have been members of the same athletic conference for over a century and were founding members of the Southeastern Conference (SEC) when it was established in 1933. The contest was an annual tradition from 1945 until 2002, when the SEC expanded and the rivalry became part of a rotation of other conference games. The two teams wouldn’t play again until a pair of games in 2006 and 2007; since then, the teams have met only three times.

The rivalry has been closely contested, both as a series and in individual games, with thirty-three of the contests decided by a touchdown or less, including two ties. And though both the Gators and Tigers have each enjoyed occasional win streaks over the years, the overall tally is close, with Auburn holding a 43–40–2 edge as of the most recent meeting in 2026. It has also seen many upsets, particularly by Auburn. Lower ranked Tiger squads have beaten top-10 Gator teams on seven occasions over the course of the rivalry, including twice when Florida was ranked #1.

== Series history ==
While the early part of the series saw Auburn and Florida trade 6-game and 5-game winning streaks respectively, the rivalry has evolved into one of the mostly evenly matched and hardest fought in the Southeastern Conference. The games have often had SEC title and national championship implications. As described by Gainesville Sun sports columnist Pat Dooley following the 2007 game, "Florida-Auburn delivered another game that made one side ecstatic and one side heartbroken. That's what it does."

The first game in the series was played between coach Mike Donahue's Tigers and coach George E. Pyle's Gators in 1912, on the Auburn, Alabama campus of what was then called Alabama Polytechnic Institute. The Auburn Tigers won the first six games played by the two teams from 1912 to 1917, dominating the Florida Gators by two or more touchdowns in five of the six games. When the series resumed in 1927, the Florida Gators were experiencing revived success under coaches Harold Sebring and Charlie Bachman, and it was the Gators' turn for a streak, winning seven of the next eight. Beginning in 1935, the fortunes of the Gators and Tigers reversed again, with the Tigers compiling a 7–2–1 record in the next ten games played through 1947.

The Auburn–Florida game has not always been played on the universities' respective campuses in Auburn, Alabama and Gainesville, Florida. In the early years of the series, six games were played in Fairfield Stadium in Jacksonville, Florida, five matches at the Cramton Bowl in Montgomery, Alabama, and one each in Miami, Florida; Columbus, Georgia; Tampa, Florida; and Mobile, Alabama. Starting in 1950, every regular game has been played at either Jordan–Hare Stadium (previously known as Auburn Stadium and Cliff Hare Stadium) in Auburn, or Ben Hill Griffin Stadium (also known as Florida Field) in Gainesville. For the only time in the series history, the Gators and Tigers met for a second time during the same season in the 2000 SEC Championship Game held at the Georgia Dome in Atlanta, Georgia with Florida following up their regular season victory with a second one to claim the conference championship.

With the construction of Auburn Stadium in 1939, the Tigers started a remarkable 32-year streak on the Tigers' home field during which they would tie the Gators once and defeat them twelve consecutive times. The Gators broke the Tigers' home-field winning streak in a hard-fought upset in 1973.

From 1945 to 2002, the Florida Gators and Auburn Tigers played 58 consecutive annual games; The Gators and Tigers have played 82 games in the past 99 years, and the current all-time series record is forty-two victories for the Tigers, thirty-eight for the Gators, and two ties. The Tigers hold a 21–7–1 edge in games played in their current stadium; the Gators have a 22–9 advantage in games played on their present field.

== Game results ==
Auburn victories	Florida victories	Tie games

No.	Date	Location	Winning team		Losing team	
1	October 12, 1912	Auburn, AL	Auburn	27	Florida	13
2	October 11, 1913	Auburn, AL	Auburn	55	Florida	0
3	October 10, 1914	Jacksonville, FL	Auburn	20	Florida	0
4	October 9, 1915	Auburn, AL	Auburn	7	Florida	0
5	November 11, 1916	Jacksonville, FL	Auburn	20	Florida	0
6	November 3, 1917	Auburn, AL	Auburn	68	Florida	0
7	October 8, 1927	Auburn, AL	Florida	33	Auburn	6
8	October 13, 1928	Gainesville, FL	Florida	27	Auburn	0
9	October 11, 1929	Montgomery, AL	Florida	19	Auburn	0
10	October 11, 1930	Jacksonville, FL	Florida	7	Auburn	0
11	October 24, 1931	Jacksonville, FL	Florida	13	Auburn	12
12	November 12, 1932	Montgomery, AL	Auburn	21	Florida	6
13	November 25, 1933	Gainesville, FL	Florida	14	Auburn	7
14	November 17, 1934	Montgomery, AL	Florida	14	Auburn	7
15	November 30, 1935	Miami, FL	Auburn	27	Florida	6
16	November 28, 1936	Montgomery, AL	Auburn	13	Florida	0
17	November 27, 1937	Jacksonville, FL	Auburn	14	Florida	0
18	November 26, 1938	Jacksonville, FL	Florida	9	Auburn	7
19	November 30, 1939	Auburn, AL	Tie	7	Tie	7
20	November 30, 1940	Columbus, GA	Auburn	20	Florida	7
21	October 10, 1942	Gainesville, FL	Florida	6	Auburn	0
22	November 3, 1945	Auburn, AL	Auburn	19	Florida	0
23	November 30, 1946	Gainesville, FL	Auburn	47	Florida	12
24	October 11, 1947	Montgomery, AL	Auburn	20	Florida	14
25	October 9, 1948	Tampa, FL	Florida	16	Auburn	9
26	October 8, 1949	Mobile, AL	Tie	14	Tie	14
27	October 14, 1950	Gainesville, FL	Florida	27	Auburn	7
28	October 13, 1951	Auburn, AL	Auburn	14	Florida	13
29	November 1, 1952	Gainesville, FL	#20 Florida	31	Auburn	21
30	October 31, 1953	Auburn, AL	Auburn	16	Florida	7
31	October 2, 1954	Gainesville, FL	#20 Florida	19	Auburn	13
32	October 1, 1955	Auburn, AL	Auburn	13	Florida	0
33	November 3, 1956	Gainesville, FL	Florida	20	Auburn	0
34	November 2, 1957	Auburn, AL	#4 Auburn	13	#19 Florida	0
35	November 1, 1958	Gainesville, FL	#4 Auburn	6	Florida	5
36	October 31, 1959	Auburn, AL	#8 Auburn	6	Florida	0
37	October 29, 1960	Gainesville, FL	#14 Auburn	10	Florida	7
38	November 25, 1961	Auburn, AL	Auburn	32	Florida	15
39	November 3, 1962	Gainesville, FL	Florida	22	#10 Auburn	3
40	November 2, 1963	Auburn, AL	#5 Auburn	19	Florida	0
41	October 31, 1964	Gainesville, FL	#10 Florida	14	Auburn	0
42	October 30, 1965	Auburn, AL	Auburn	28	#7 Florida	17
43	October 29, 1966	Gainesville, FL	#7 Florida	30	Auburn	27

No.	Date	Location	Winning team		Losing team	
44	November 4, 1967	Auburn, AL	Auburn	26	Florida	21
45	November 2, 1968	Gainesville, FL	Auburn	24	#20 Florida	13
46	November 1, 1969	Auburn, AL	#17 Auburn	38	#7 Florida	12
47	October 31, 1970	Gainesville, FL	#12 Auburn	63	Florida	14
48	October 30, 1971	Auburn, AL	#5 Auburn	40	Florida	7
49	November 4, 1972	Gainesville, FL	#11 Auburn	26	Florida	20
50	November 3, 1973	Auburn, AL	Florida	12	#19 Auburn	8
51	November 2, 1974	Gainesville, FL	#11 Florida	25	#5 Auburn	14
52	November 1, 1975	Auburn, AL	#11 Florida	31	Auburn	14
53	October 30, 1976	Gainesville, FL	#12 Florida	24	Auburn	19
54	October 29, 1977	Auburn, AL	Auburn	29	#18 Florida	14
55	November 4, 1978	Gainesville, FL	Florida	31	Auburn	7
56	November 3, 1979	Auburn, AL	#20 Auburn	19	Florida	13
57	November 1, 1980	Gainesville, FL	Florida	21	Auburn	10
58	October 31, 1981	Auburn, AL	Auburn	14	Florida	12
59	October 30, 1982	Gainesville, FL	Florida	19	#19 Auburn	17
60	October 29, 1983	Auburn, AL	#4 Auburn	28	#5 Florida	21
61	November 3, 1984	Gainesville, FL	#13 Florida	24	#11 Auburn	3
62	November 2, 1985	Auburn, AL	#2 Florida	14	#6 Auburn	10
63	November 1, 1986	Gainesville, FL	Florida	18	#5 Auburn	17
64	October 31, 1987	Auburn, AL	#6 Auburn	29	#10 Florida	6
65	October 29, 1988	Gainesville, FL	#9 Auburn	16	Florida	0
66	November 4, 1989	Auburn, AL	#12 Auburn	10	#19 Florida	7
67	November 3, 1990	Gainesville, FL	#15 Florida	48	#4 Auburn	7
68	November 2, 1991	Auburn, AL	#6 Florida	31	Auburn	10
69	October 17, 1992	Gainesville, FL	#23 Florida	24	Auburn	9
70	October 16, 1993	Auburn, AL	#19 Auburn	38	#4 Florida	35
71	October 15, 1994	Gainesville, FL	#6 Auburn	36	#1 Florida	33
72	October 14, 1995	Auburn, AL	#3 Florida	49	#7 Auburn	38
73	October 19, 1996	Gainesville, FL	#1 Florida	51	#10 Auburn	10
74	October 18, 1997	Auburn, AL	#7 Florida	24	#6 Auburn	10
75	October 17, 1998	Gainesville, FL	#5 Florida	24	Auburn	3
76	October 16, 1999	Auburn, AL	#7 Florida	32	Auburn	14
77	October 14, 2000	Gainesville, FL	#10 Florida	38	#19 Auburn	7
78	December 2, 2000	Atlanta, GA	#7 Florida	28	#18 Auburn	6
79	October 13, 2001	Auburn, AL	Auburn	23	#1 Florida	20
80	October 19, 2002	Gainesville, FL	Florida	30	Auburn	23
81	October 14, 2006	Auburn, AL	#11 Auburn	27	#2 Florida	17
82	September 29, 2007	Gainesville, FL	Auburn	20	#4 Florida	17
83	October 15, 2011	Auburn, AL	#24 Auburn	17	Florida	6
84	October 5, 2019	Gainesville, FL	#10 Florida	24	#7 Auburn	13
85	September 19, 2026	Auburn, AL	Florida	44	Auburn	39
Series: Auburn leads 43–40–2

== Notable games ==
Most great rivalries are marked by frequent close games, unexpected upsets, and memorable moments; the evenly matched Auburn–Florida rivalry has provided many. Thirty-three of the eighty-two games in the series have been decided by seven points or fewer. Among SEC rivalries, the Auburn–Florida series (43–40–2) is the third-most evenly matched after the Georgia-Auburn series (64–56–8) and the Florida–Tennessee series (32–21). Auburn has won two national football championships, and seven SEC championships; Florida has won three national championships, and eight SEC championships. In terms of all-time winning percentage, less than half a percentage point separates the Tigers (.634) and the Gators (.631). Several of the most notable games in the 99-year history of the rivalry are described below.

=== 1939: Auburn's new stadium ===
In the first varsity football game played at the Tigers' new Auburn Stadium, coach Josh Cody's 1939 Gators and coach Jack Meagher's Tigers played to a 7–7 tie. In the second quarter, Florida fullback Charlie Tate scored the only touchdown of the day for the Gators, then kicked the extra point; Tigers back Dick McGowen threw a touchdown pass to end Babe McGehee to tie the game in the fourth quarter. The meeting ended in controversy when an official miscommunicated the amount of time remaining in the game to Auburn quarterback Lloyd Cheatham, who was under the impression the Tigers had two minutes (rather than two seconds) left to score; at the time, Auburn had the ball on Florida's two-yard line. After the 1939 dedication of Auburn Stadium, the Gators would not win (or tie) a game on the Auburn campus for another thirty-four years.

=== 1957: First meeting of ranked teams ===
When coach Bob Woodruff's nineteenth-ranked 1957 Florida Gators and coach Shug Jordan's Auburn Tigers met in Cliff Hare Stadium in Auburn, it was the first game between the rivals in which both teams were ranked in the top twenty of the AP Poll. Woodruff's Gators featured their usual strong defense, but the Tigers defense was even better and held the Gators scoreless in their 13–0 victory. At the end of the season, the Gators finished in the top twenty of the final AP Poll for only the second time in their history, as the Tigers earned the 1957 AP Poll national championship.

=== 1958: Baseball score? ===
Coach Bob Woodruff's Gators and coach Shug Jordan's Tigers played nine games against each other between 1951 and 1959, only three of which were decided by more than ten points. However, none was closer than the game between the unranked 1958 Florida Gators and the defending national champions and fourth-ranked Auburn Tigers, a game in which neither team scored more than six points. Late in the fourth quarter, with the Tigers leading 6–3 on the strength of a single touchdown and a missed extra point, the stingy Gators defense pinned the Tigers offense behind their own three-yard-line. Rather than risk a turnover, Jordan ordered Tigers quarterback Johnny Kern to kneel in their own end zone, intentionally scoring a safety for the Gators, but earning a free punt for the Tigers. The Tigers kicked it away, and their defense held on to win 6–5.

=== 1962: Florida upsets No. 10 Auburn ===
Auburn came to Gainesville ranked #10 in the AP Poll and 5–0 on the season to face the struggling Gators, who entered the contest at 3–3. However, the Tigers ran into an ambush as the underdog Gators intercepted two passes, and recovered three fumbles en route to a 22–3 win.

=== 1966: Heisman Trophy field goal ===
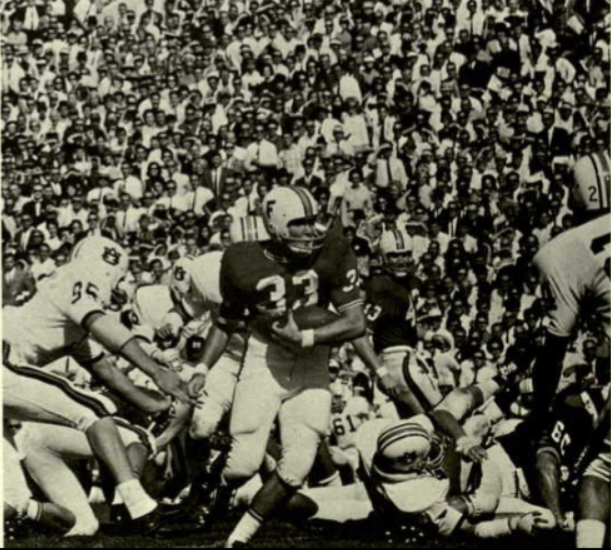
Larry Smith running vs. Auburn.

Coach Ray Graves' 1966 Florida Gators and coach Shug Jordan's Auburn Tigers repeatedly traded the lead as they battled back and forth all day. In the fourth quarter with the game tied at 27, Gators quarterback Steve Spurrier was engineering a late drive for the win, but was stopped at Auburn's 39-yard-line following an intentional grounding penalty. The distance was outside the usual range of the Gators regular placekicker, but Spurrier had kicked 40-yard field goals in practice. With 2:12 left in the game, he kicked the 40-yard field goal to give the Gators a 30–27 lead, and the Gators defense held on to win. He completed twenty-seven passes on forty attempts for 259 yards, one touchdown pass and no interceptions, and also rushed for a touchdown. Another Gators standout, tailback Larry Smith, finished the day with 102 rushing yards and a touchdown on twenty-two carries, including a 53-yard run. At the conclusion of the 1966 season, Spurrier was awarded the Heisman Trophy.

=== 1973: Breaking the Auburn jinx ===
Led by first-time starting quarterback Don Gaffney, the 1973 Gators finally broke the Tigers; home-field winning streak after thirty-four years. Gators linebacker Ralph Ortega tackled Tigers tailback Chris Linderman inside the Gators' five yard-line and forced a fumble shortly before halftime. Gators linebacker Sammy Green forced a critical fumble by Auburn Tigers tailback Sullivan Walker, which led to a touchdown and the Gators' margin of victory in a 12–8 upset of the Tigers at home to give the Gators their first-ever win at Jordan–Hare Stadium. Auburn scored its only points in the final play of the game. After the game, Gators players carried head coach Doug Dickey from the field, and Gators athletic director Ray Graves described the victory as "one of the greatest moments in University of Florida football history."

=== 1976: 'Attack' of the War Eagle ===
Coach Doug Dickey's 1976 Gators and coach Doug Barfield's Tigers played a strong defensive game, with the Gators' winning margin coming on two pass plays—with some help from Auburn's mascot. The decisive score came late in the game when Gators quarterback Jimmy Fisher tossed a short pass to wide receiver Wes Chandler, who caught it, reversed direction twice, and weaved his way through the entire Auburn defense for a 64-yard touchdown reception and run. After Chandler ran out of the end zone, Auburn's War Eagle, Tiger, jumped off its perch to avoid a collision, her talons grazing Chandler's shoulder pads, an encounter Chandler later described as an attack. For decades, a coincidental 15-yard penalty assessed on the ensuing kickoff against Auburn for a late hit on Chandler has been mistakenly reported as an infraction stemming from interference by a mascot. Florida won 24–19.

=== 1982: Gainey wins for Gators ===
Auburn led 17–13 with 2:51 remaining in the game. Jim Gainey's field goal cut it to one, and after an onside kick, Gainey added another for the win.

=== 1985: Bo knows defense ===
Coach Galen Hall's second-ranked 1985 Florida Gators were on NCAA probation when they met coach Pat Dye's sixth-ranked Auburn Tigers at Jordan−Hare Stadium. Tigers tailback Bo Jackson started the game as the leading contender to win the Heisman Trophy. But Jackson's Heisman hopes took a serious blow when he ran into a ferocious Gators defense that held him to just forty-seven yards rushing, and the Gators stuffed the Tigers 14–10 in yet another defensive struggle. On the strength of the win over the Tigers, the Gators vaulted into the No. 1 spot in the AP Poll for the first time in school history. Notwithstanding the Tigers' loss to the Gators, Jackson won the Heisman at the conclusion of the 1985 season.

=== 1986: Bell leads fourth-quarter comeback ===
For most of the game, coach Pat Dye's fifth-ranked 1986 Auburn Tigers dominated coach Galen Hall's unranked Florida Gators at Florida Field. The Tigers defense was stifling, and forced Gators substitute quarterback Rodney Brewer to commit four turnovers in the first two quarters. Hall replaced Brewer with starting quarterback Kerwin Bell, who had missed two games with a knee injury. Tigers tailback Brent Fullwood gained 166 yards on the ground, including a second-quarter touchdown, to give Auburn a 17–0 lead early in the fourth quarter. Bell then led the Gators on two scoring drives, with Gators placekicker Robert McGinty—a transfer from Auburn—booting a 51-yard field goal to close the Tigers' advantage to 17–10 with 7:10 to play. After Webbie Burnett recovered a fumble at the Florida 34 with 1:41 remaining in the game, Bell directed one final drive that was capped by a five-yard touchdown pass with 0:36 remaining to wide receiver Ricky Nattiel, who was playing with a separated shoulder. The limping Bell then surprised the Tigers defense by running in the two-point conversion and completing the comeback, with the Gators winning 18–17.

=== 1990: Spurrier's offense makes a statement ===
Coach Pat Dye's 1990 Auburn Tigers were the defending three-time SEC champions, had built an undefeated 6–0–1 record, and were ranked fourth in the nation in the AP Poll. Notwithstanding the fact that first-year coach Steve Spurrier's fifteenth-ranked Florida Gators were three-point favorites, Dye had been publicly dismissive of Spurrier's pass-oriented offense before the game. The Gators and Tigers were tied 7–7 after the first quarter, but Spurrier's Gators exploded for twenty-seven points in the second quarter, resulting in a 34–7 halftime lead and a 48–7 victory for the Gators, which was the Gators' biggest margin of victory in the series, and the worst loss of Dye's career.

=== 1993: Auburn upsets No. 4 Florida ===
On a cold, drizzling, dreary day in Auburn, coach Steve Spurrier's fourth-ranked 1993 Gators amassed 560 yards of total offense, including 386 yards passing by quarterback Danny Wuerffel and 196 yards rushing by tailback Errict Rhett. But the Gators' offensive fireworks were not enough for the win, as Auburn's defense sacked Wuerffel four times and made two key interceptions. The two teams were tied at 35 with 1:21 left in the game, when Tigers placekicker Scott Etheridge booted a 41-yard field to beat the Gators, 38–35.

=== 1994: Auburn upsets No. 1 Florida ===
Coach Terry Bowden's sixth-ranked 1994 Auburn Tigers entered the Swamp as 17-point underdogs to coach Steve Spurrier's top-ranked Florida Gators, but, just like the year before, the Tigers offense kept pace with the Gators as its defense forced key turnovers by the Gators. The Gators' starting quarterback, Terry Dean, threw four interceptions in the first half, and was replaced by Danny Wuerffel, who threw three touchdown passes but was intercepted by Tigers defensive back Brian Robinson with 1:20 left. Tigers quarterback Patrick Nix engineered a quick drive, and threw an eight-yard touchdown pass to Frank Sanders, winning the game for Auburn, 36–33.

=== 2001: Auburn upsets No. 1 Florida again ===
Coach Tommy Tuberville's unranked 2001 Auburn Tigers were 21-point underdogs when they met coach Steve Spurrier's No. 1 Florida Gators at Jordan–Hare Stadium. Gators quarterback Rex Grossman completed twenty-five of forty-two passes for 364 yards and two touchdowns, but also threw four interceptions. The Gators dominated statistically, but the Tigers' bend-but-don't-break defense held the Gators rushing game to negative yardage. Tigers back-up quarterback Daniel Cobb was not so flashy, but played mistake-free football, and the game was tied at 20 late in the fourth quarter. With 10 seconds left, Tigers placekicker Damon Duval nailed a 44-yard field goal and the Tigers upset the top-ranked Gators 23–20.

=== 2002: Not in our house ===
First-year coach Ron Zook led his unranked Florida Gators against coach Tommy Tuberville's Auburn Tigers in Gainesville. Rex Grossman quarterbacked the Gators to a pair of early scores, and Florida led 23–7. The Tigers' starting tailback, Carnell Williams, left the game with a broken leg, but backup Ronnie Brown amassed 162 yards and three touchdowns, as the Tigers came roaring back to tie the score at 23 in the fourth quarter. With one final chance to win the game in regulation, Tigers placekicker Damon Duval lined up for the game-winning kick as he had in 2001, but Gators defensive end Bobby McCray blocked the kick as time expired. In overtime, Grossman threw a 25-yard touchdown pass to receiver Taylor Jacobs, the Gators defense held the Tigers on downs, and Florida won 30–23.

=== 2007: Auburn upsets No. 4 Florida again ===
Coach Urban Meyer's fourth-ranked 2007 Florida Gators played host to coach Tommy Tuberville's unranked Auburn Tigers. Tigers quarterback Brandon Cox led the Tigers to an early 17–3 lead, but Gators quarterback (and eventual Heisman Trophy winner) Tim Tebow and all-purpose back and receiver Percy Harvin led a comeback to tie it at 17. The Tigers had one chance to win in regulation, as kicker Wes Byrum attempted a potentially game winning 45-yard field goal with four seconds left and nailed it. But Meyer had called a timeout at the last possible moment to ice the kicker before the snap had taken place. So, after the timeout, Byrum had to try it again. After successfully making the field goal again as time expired to upset Florida 20–17, he taunted the Florida head coach and crowd with a few mock Gator chomps.

== See also ==
- List of NCAA college football rivalry games

== Bibliography ==
- 2009 Southern Conference Football Media Guide, Year-by-Year Standings, Southern Conference, Spartanburg, South Carolina, pp. 74–77(2009).
- 2010 Southeastern Conference Football Media Guide, Southeastern Conference, Birmingham, Alabama, p. 60 (2010).
- 2011 Auburn Tigers Football Media Guide , Auburn University Athletic Department, Auburn, Alabama, pp. 178–189, 191 (2011).
- 2011 Florida Gators Football Media Guide, University Athletic Association, Gainesville, Florida, pp. 116–125 (2011).
- Carlson, Norm, University of Florida Football Vault: The History of the Florida Gators, Whitman Publishing, LLC, Atlanta, Georgia (2007). ISBN 0-7948-2298-3.
- Golenbock, Peter, Go Gators! An Oral History of Florida's Pursuit of Gridiron Glory, Legends Publishing, LLC, St. Petersburg, Florida (2002). ISBN 0-9650782-1-3.
- Hairston, Jack, Tales from the Gator Swamp: A Collection of the Greatest Gator Stories Ever Told, Sports Publishing, LLC, Champaign, Illinois (2002). ISBN 1-58261-514-4.
- Housel, David, Auburn University Football Vault: The Story of the Auburn Tigers, 1892–2007, Whitman Publishing, LLC, Atlanta, Georgia (2007). ISBN 978-0-7948-2350-4.
- McCarthy, Kevin M., Fightin' Gators: A History of University of Florida Football, Arcadia Publishing, Mount Pleasant, South Carolina (2000). ISBN 978-0-7385-0559-6.
- McEwen, Tom, The Gators: A Story of Florida Football, The Strode Publishers, Huntsville, Alabama (1974). ISBN 0-87397-025-X.
- Nash, Noel, ed., The Gainesville Sun Presents The Greatest Moments in Florida Gators Football, Sports Publishing, Inc., Champaign, Illinois (1998). ISBN 1-57167-196-X.
- Proctor, Samuel, & Wright Langley, Gator History: A Pictorial History of the University of Florida, South Star Publishing Company, Gainesville, Florida (1986). ISBN 0-938637-00-2.
- Saylor, Roger, "Southern Intercollegiate Athletic Association," College Football Historical Society, The LA84 Foundation (1993).
