= Bill Carr (American football player) =

American football executive (1945–2024)

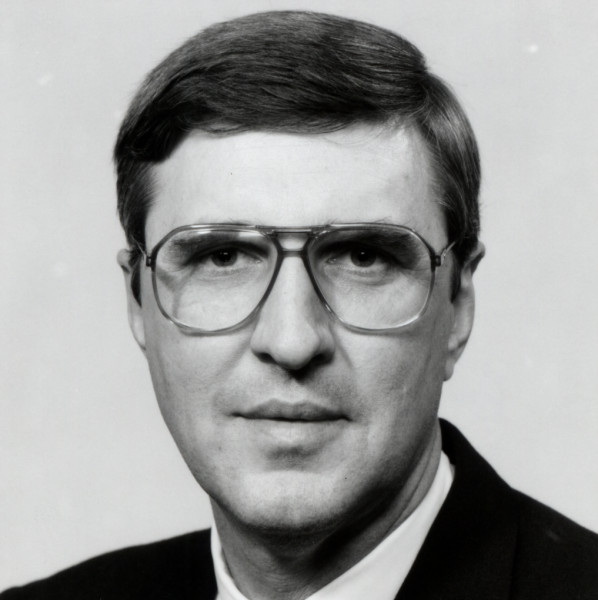

Biographical details
- Born: November 29, 1945; Gainesville, Florida, U.S.
- Died: February 3, 2024 (aged 78)
- Education: University of Florida

Playing career
- 1964–1966: Florida
- Position: Center

Coaching career (HC unless noted)
- 1972–1974: Florida (assistant)

Administrative career (AD unless noted)
- 1979–1986: Florida
- 1993–1997: Houston

Accomplishments and honors

Awards
- First-team All-American (1966); First-team All-SEC (1966); University of Florida Athletic Hall of Fame

William Curtis Carr III (November 29, 1945 – February 3, 2024) was an American college football player, coach, and athletics administrator. Carr was born in Gainesville, Florida, raised in Pensacola, Florida, and attended the University of Florida, where he was an All-American center for the Florida Gators football team in the mid-1960s. He was selected in the 4th round of the 1967 NFL/AFL draft but first had to serve two years in the United States Army, after which he did not make a regular season NFL roster. Carr returned to UF as graduate assistant and assistant coach under head coach Doug Dickey in 1972 and, after earning his master's degree, joined the school's athletic administration in 1975. He became Florida's athletic director in 1979 at the age of 33, making him the youngest athletic director at a major university at the time. As head of UF's Athletic Association, Carr oversaw the construction of the Stephen C. O'Connell Center and a major addition to Florida Field while also presiding over major NCAA rules violations in the football program.

Carr resigned in 1986 and went into private business for several years before serving as the athletic director at the University of Houston from 1993 until 1997, when he retired and established a college sports consulting firm. Carr died on February 3, 2024, at the age of 78.

== Early life ==
Carr was born in Gainesville, Florida, the son of a Baptist minister. He grew up in Vero Beach and Pensacola, Florida. Carr attended Pensacola High School, and was a standout high school football player for the Pensacola Tigers. Following his senior season, he was recognized as a first-team all-state selection.

== College years ==
Carr accepted an athletic scholarship to attend the University of Florida in Gainesville, where he was the center for coach Ray Graves' Florida Gators football team from 1964 to 1966. Carr was a teammate and roommate of the Gators' Heisman Trophy-winning quarterback Steve Spurrier for several years, and the two remained friends until Carr's death. Carr served as a team captain during his senior year and was named a first-team All-Southeastern Conference selection and a first-team All-American after the season. Carr concluded his college playing career in the 1967 Orange Bowl, which the Gators earned a 27–12 victory over the Georgia Tech Yellow Jackets.

Carr graduated from Florida with a bachelor's degree in Spanish in 1968, and was later inducted into the University of Florida Athletic Hall of Fame as a "Gator Great."

== Professional football and military service ==
The New Orleans Saints selected Carr in the fourth round (106th pick overall) of the 1967 NFL/AFL draft. Carr signed with the Saints in 1967, but had to fulfill his military service obligation before he could play. He served two years in the U.S. Army, mainly in South Korea, and upon returning to the Saints, he was released during the final roster cuts before the 1970 season.

== Coach, athletic director and consultant ==
Carr retired as a player and returned to the University of Florida in 1970 to serve as a football graduate assistant under head coach Doug Dickey while earning master's degrees in education and sports administration. After serving as a graduate assistant, assistant junior varsity coach, and academic advisor for parts of three academic years, he concluded that his "heart wasn't in coaching" and joined the UF athletic department's administrative staff as an assistant to athletic director Ray Graves in 1974. Carr was promoted to the position of assistant athletic director in 1976, and when Graves retired in 1979, Carr was promoted to replace him, making him the youngest Division I athletic director in the country at the time.

While leading the University of Florida Athletic Association, Carr was credited with improving the athletic department's financial footing and sports facilities (including a major expansion of Florida Field and the construction of the O'Connell Center), setting the stage for future success and helping make possible the Gators' first conference football championship in 1984. However, he also oversaw a scandal which saw that football championship vacated for recruiting and other NCAA violations under head coach Charlie Pell. Carr resigned in 1986 and was succeeded by Bill Arnsparger.

After leaving Florida, Carr served as the executive director of a youth advocacy group and a vice-president at Raycom Sports before returning to sports administration as the athletic director at the University of Houston from 1993 to 1997. After leaving Houston, Carr founded and led an intercollegiate athletics consulting group for several years before semi-retiring to serve as an executive coach in 2020.

== See also ==
- 1966 College Football All-America Team
- Florida Gators
- Florida Gators football, 1960–69
- History of the University of Florida
- Houston Cougars
- List of University of Florida alumni
- List of University of Florida Athletic Hall of Fame members
- University Athletic Association
