= Richard Trapp =

American football player (born 1946)

No. 28, 44, 42
- Position: Wide receiver

Personal information
- Born: September 21, 1946 (age 80); Lynwood, California, U.S.
- Listed height: 6 ft 1 in (1.85 m)
- Listed weight: 175 lb (79 kg)

Career information
- High school: Bradenton (FL) Manatee
- College: Florida (1964-1967)
- NFL draft: 1968: 3rd round, 63rd overall pick

Career history
- Buffalo Bills (1968); San Diego Chargers (1969); Florida Blazers (1974)

Awards and highlights
- Second-team All-American (1967); 2× First-team All-SEC (1966, 1967); Florida–Georgia Hall of Fame; University of Florida Athletic Hall of Fame

Career AFL statistics
- Receptions: 26
- Receiving yards: 274
- Return yards: 26
- Stats at Pro Football Reference

Richard Earl Trapp (born September 21, 1946) is an American former professional football player who was a wide receiver for two seasons in the American Football League (AFL) during the late 1960s. Trapp played college football for the Florida Gators, and thereafter, played in the AFL for the Buffalo Bills and San Diego Chargers.

== Early life ==
He was born in Lynwood, California. Trapp attended Manatee High School in Bradenton, Florida, where he was a standout high school football player for the Manatee Hurricanes.

== College career ==
Trapp accepted an athletic scholarship to attend the University of Florida in Gainesville, Florida, where he played for coach Ray Graves' Florida Gators football team from 1965 to 1967. In three seasons as a starting wide receiver for the Gators, he totaled 1,783 receiving yards, and compiled eight games in which he caught passes for 100 yards or more. In 1966 he caught passes for 148 yards against the Auburn Tigers, and 150 yards against the Ole Miss Rebels; in 1967, he compiled 171 receiving yards against the Georgia Bulldogs. Trapp was a first-team All-Southeastern Conference (SEC) selection in 1966 and 1967, and the recipient of the Gators' Fergie Ferguson Award in 1967. He also played for coach Dave Fuller's Florida Gators baseball team in 1967 and 1968.

Trapp graduated from the University of Florida with a bachelor's degree in 1969, and a J.D. degree in 1974, and he was later inducted into the University of Florida Athletic Hall of Fame.

== Professional career ==
The Buffalo Bills selected Trapp in the third round (83rd pick overall) of the 1968 combined draft, and he played for the Bills during the 1968 season. During his one year with the Bills, he played in all 14 games, catching 24 passes for 235 yards. During his second season, he saw limited action with the San Diego Chargers in eight games. He finished his professional football career with 26 receptions for 274 yards.

== Life after football ==
Trapp is a practicing attorney in Orlando, Florida. His son Jackson Trapp played college basketball at Florida Atlantic University and later in the professional ranks.

== See also ==
- Florida Gators football, 1960–69
- List of Florida Gators in the NFL draft
- List of Levin College of Law graduates
- List of University of Florida alumni
- University of Florida Athletic Hall of Fame
