= Jerry Anderson (American football coach) =

American football player and coach (born 1945)

Biographical details
- Born: February 21, 1945 (age 81); Miami, Florida, U.S.

Playing career
- 1964–1966: Florida
- Position: Defensive lineman

Coaching career (HC unless noted)
- 1968–1969: Florida (freshmen)
- 1971–1972: North Miami HS (FL) (AHC/DC)
- 1973–1977: Miami Carol City HS (FL)
- 1978: Miami (FL) (ST/LB/S&C)
- 1979–1982: Army (OL/S&C)
- 1983–1984: UCF (OL/S&C)
- 1984: UCF (interim HC)
- 1985–1989: Florida (ST/TE)
- 1990: Florida (DT)
- 1991–1994: Florida (AHC/DT)
- 2002–2004: Florida (DL)

Head coaching record
- Overall: 1–3 (college)

Accomplishments and honors

Championships
- FHSAA Class 4A (1977)

Jerry D. Anderson (born February 21, 1945), also known by his nickname "Red Anderson," is an American former college football player and coach.

Anderson attended the University of Florida, where he was defensive lineman for coach Ray Graves' Florida Gators football team from 1964 to 1966. He was senior co-captain of the 1966 Gators team that finished 9–2, and defeated the Georgia Tech Yellow Jackets, 27–12, in the Orange Bowl – the Gators' first-ever major bowl victory.

Anderson served as the offensive line coach for the UCF Knights football team of the University of Central Florida (UCF) from 1983 to 1984. He became the interim head coach of the Knights in 1984, succeeding Lou Saban in mid-season. Afterward, Anderson became a long-time assistant coach for the Florida Gators, serving for two stints: first, from 1985 to 1994 under head coaches Galen Hall and Steve Spurrier, and later from 2002 to 2004 under head coach Ron Zook. During his 14 years as a Gators assistant, he served as tight ends coach, special teams coach, defensive tackles coach, associate head coach, and defensive line coach.

Anderson is a "Distinguished Letterman" member of the University of Florida Athletic Hall of Fame.

== Head coaching record ==
=== College ===
Year	Team	Overall	Conference	Standing	Bowl/playoffs
UCF Knights (NCAA Division II independent) (1984)
1984	UCF	1–3 (Note: Anderson was named interim head coach with four weeks remaining in the season following the firing of Lou Saban.)			
UCF:		1–3			
Total:		1–3			

== See also ==
- List of University of Florida alumni
