= Gene Ellenson =

American football player, coach, and administrator (1921–1995)

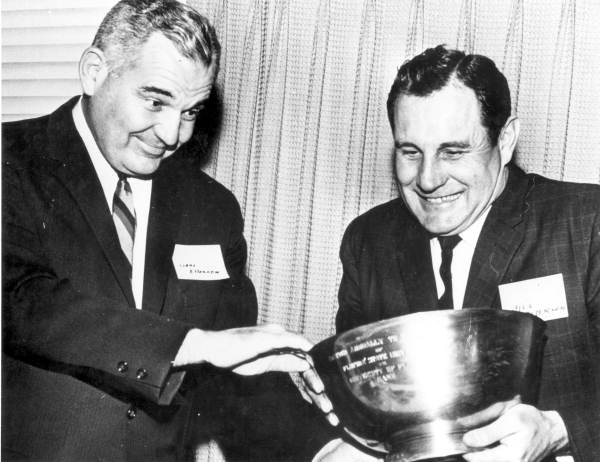
- Ellenson (left) with Florida State coach Bill Peterson in 1961

Biographical details
- Born: March 21, 1921; Chippewa Falls, Wisconsin, U.S.
- Died: March 17, 1995 (aged 73); Gainesville, Florida, U.S.

Playing career
- 1940–1942: Georgia
- 1946: Miami Seahawks
- Position: Tackle

Coaching career (HC unless noted)
- 1947–1949: Miami HS (FL) (assistant)
- 1950–1958: Miami (FL) (assistant)
- 1960–1969: Florida (DC)

Administrative career (AD unless noted)
- 1970–1987: Florida (associate AD)

Accomplishments and honors

Awards
- University of Florida Athletic Hall of Fame

Eugene Ellenson (March 24, 1921 – March 17, 1995) was an American college and professional football player, college football coach, and athletic administrator. Ellenson was born in Wisconsin, grew up in Miami, and attended the University of Georgia, where he was a starting Tackle on the Bulldog's 1942 national championship football team. He served in the U.S. Army during World War II and was highly decorated for his actions during the Battle of the Bulge.

Upon returning from the war, Ellenson played for the Miami Seahawks, a professional football team that folded after one season. He began his coaching career in 1947 as an assistant at his alma mater, Miami Senior High School. After three years in the high school ranks, he became an assistant coach at the University of Miami. University of Florida (UF) head coach Ray Graves hired Ellenson as a defensive assistant in 1960, and promoted him to be the Gators' defensive coordinator and assistant head coach in 1964. When Graves left coaching to become UF's full-time athletic director following the 1969 season, Ellenson became the associate AD in charge of Gator Boosters, the fundraising arm of the University of Florida Athletic Association. Ellenson remained in that position until his retirement in 1987.

Ellenson was known for his fiery and inspirational pep talks. Even after his retirement, he was asked to speak to UF's sports teams before big games, particularly by football coach Steve Spurrier, who had played at Florida when Ellenson was an assistant coach. Spurrier established the "Gene Ellenson Award" in 1991, which is given to the team's "most inspirational" player.

== Early years ==
Ellenson was born in Chippewa Falls, Wisconsin in 1921. He attended Miami Senior High School in Miami, Florida, where he was standout high school football player for the Miami Stingarees.

== College career ==
Ellenson received an athletic scholarship to attend the University of Georgia in Athens, Georgia, where he played for coach Wally Butts' Georgia Bulldogs football team from 1940 to 1942. He was a starting senior lineman on the 1942 Bulldogs team that finished 11–1 and defeated the UCLA Bruins in the Rose Bowl, thus claiming a share of the 1942 national championship. He graduated from the University of Georgia with a bachelor's degree in journalism in 1943.

== Military service ==
After graduation, Ellenson was inducted into the U.S. Army and served in the European Theater during World War II. During the Battle of the Bulge in December 1944, he was an infantry lieutenant who commanded the defense of a hill against repeated assaults by elements of the German army. Having taken and held the hill until relieved, he was one of only four survivors of his command. Ellenson rose to the rank of captain and was awarded the Silver Star, Bronze Star Medal, Purple Heart and the Union of Soviet Socialist Republics' Bravery Medal for his valor and service.

== Professional career ==
Following his discharge from the U.S. Army, Ellenson played professionally for the Miami Seahawks of the All-America Football Conference (AAFC) for a single season in 1946. He played 13 games for the Seahawks at right tackle, starting eleven of them.

== Coaching career ==
Ellenson was the line coach for the Miami Senior High School Stingarees football team from 1947 to 1949. He then became an assistant for the Miami Hurricanes football team at the University of Miami, serving under head coach Andy Gustafson from 1950 to 1958. As a member of the Hurricanes coaching staff, he was principally responsible for coaching the defensive line. After the 1958 season, he decided to quit coaching and sought a new career in real estate.

When Ray Graves was hired to be the new head coach of the Florida Gators football team at the University of Florida in January 1960, Ellenson was the first assistant that Graves hired. He and Graves maintained a close working relationship during Graves' ten-year stint as the Gators' head coach, and following his third year on the Florida coaching staff, Graves promoted him to defensive coordinator and assistant head coach. Ellenson was a key contributor to the Gators' first three nine-win seasons in 1960, 1966 and 1969.

Graves privately contemplated his retirement from coaching before and during the 1969 season, and rumors circulated that he would continue to serve as the University of Florida's athletic director while Ellenson would be promoted to head coach. Graves did indeed resign as coach after the season ended in a Gator Bowl win over Tennessee, but university president Stephen C. O'Connell passed over Ellenson and chose Tennessee coach and Florida alumnus Doug Dickey to become the Gators' new football coach, much to the chagrin of the Florida football team.

Afterward, Ellenson left coaching altogether and became an associate athletic director under Graves and the executive director of Gators Boosters, Inc., the fund-raising arm of the University Athletic Association.

=== Pep talks ===
Ellenson was hugely popular among the Gators players, and served as the team's chief motivational speaker during the 1960s and beyond.

After the Gators struggled to a 1–2 record to begin the 1962 season, Ellenson wrote a letter to each member of the team detailing his World War II experiences and encouraging them to play harder: "You'll be a better man for it, and the next adversity won't be so tough." Players and coaches credit "The Letter" for inspiring the team to beat several tough opponents and end the season with a bowl victory.

Ellenson's pep talk before the Gators' 1963 game against Alabama inspired Gators lineman Jack Katz to smash his helmet through a locker room blackboard, and inspired the team to upset the Crimson Tide 10–6, handing Alabama coach Bear Bryant his first of only two career losses in Tuscaloosa.

When Buster Bishop, the coach of the Florida Gators men's golf team, fell ill immediately before the 1968 NCAA national tournament, Ellenson accompanied the golfers to the tournament in Las Cruces, New Mexico in his place. He delivered a memorable pep talk to the team using his favorite "positive molecules" metaphor, and the Gators upset the top-ranked Houston Cougars to win the NCAA tournament—the first national championship, in any sport, won by University of Florida athletes.

Even after he left the coaching profession in 1970, Ellenson was still called upon to deliver motivational pregame speeches. In 1986, then-Gators coach Galen Hall invited Ellenson to give a pregame talk before the 3–4 Gators faced the 7–0 and 5th-ranked Auburn Tigers. Florida won 18–17 in what is still considered one of the greatest games in Florida Field history.

Steve Spurrier had been the Gators' award-winning quarterback while Ellenson was an assistant coach in the 1960s. When Spurrier was the head coach at Duke in the late 1980s, he twice had Ellenson give pep talks to his team before traditional rivalry games. Duke won on both occasions. When Spurrier returned to his alma mater in 1990 to become the Gators' head coach, he again invited Ellenson to deliver inspirational talks before big games. The Gators went 4–0 in those contests.

== Death and legacy ==
Ellenson was inducted into the University of Florida Athletic Hall of Fame as an "Honorary Letterwinner" in 1989. In 1991, coach Steve Spurrier established the Gene Ellenson Award, which is given annually to the "most inspirational player" on Florida's football team.

Ellenson died of renal and respiratory failure at North Florida Regional Hospital in Gainesville on March 17, 1995, after a long illness. He was survived by his wife Jeanne, and their son and daughter. Florida alumnus and benefactor Alfred McKethan endowed a scholarship in Ellenson's name following his death.

== See also ==
- List of University of Georgia people
