= Chuck Hinton (disambiguation) =

Chuck Hinton may refer to:

- Chuck Hinton (1934–2013), American baseball player
- Chuck Hinton (defensive lineman) (1939–1999), American football player
- Chuck Hinton (offensive lineman) (1942–2025), American football player
