= 1967 Orange Bowl =

American college football game

- 33rd Orange Bowl
- The Miami Orange Bowl in Miami, Florida, hosted the Orange Bowl.
Georgia Tech Yellow Jackets	Florida Gators
(9–1)	(8–2)
Independent	SEC
12	27
Head coach: Bobby Dodd	Head coach: Ray Graves
AP / Coaches; 8 / 8	AP / Coaches; NR / 11
	1	2	3	4	Total
Georgia Tech	6	0	0	6	12
Florida	0	7	7	13	27
- Date: January 2, 1967
- Season: 1966
- Stadium: Orange Bowl
- Location: Miami, Florida
- MVP: Larry Smith (Florida TB)
- Favorite: Georgia Tech (slight)
- Referee: R. Pete Williams (SEC)
- Attendance: 72,426

United States TV coverage
- Network: NBC
- Announcers: Curt Gowdy, Paul Christman

The 1967 Orange Bowl was the 33rd edition of college football bowl game, played at the Orange Bowl in Miami, Florida, on Monday, January 2. The final game of the 1966–67 bowl season, it matched the eighth-ranked independent Georgia Tech Yellow Jackets and the Florida Gators of the Southeastern Conference (SEC). A slight underdog, Florida won 27–12.

New Year's Day was on Sunday in 1967, so the game was played the following day.

== Teams ==
=== Georgia Tech ===
The #8 Yellow Jackets opened with nine wins, then lost at rival Georgia. They were making their first Orange Bowl appearance in fifteen years and were led by Bobby Dodd, completing his 22nd season as head coach.

=== Florida ===
The Gators were led on offense by quarterback Steve Spurrier, winner of the Heisman Trophy. They finished second to Georgia and Alabama, who went to the Cotton Bowl and Sugar Bowl, respectively. This was Florida's first Orange Bowl and their fourth bowl appearance in six years under head coach Ray Graves, a former assistant to Dodd at Georgia Tech.

== Game summary ==
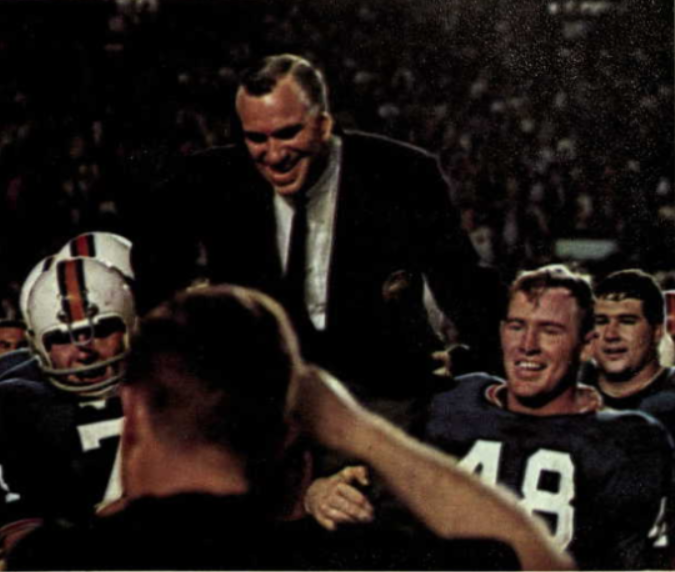
Florida head coach Ray Graves being carried off the field

This was the third year the game was played at night, following the Rose Bowl.

Kim King threw a ten-yard touchdown pass to Craig Baynham to give Georgia Tech a 6–0 lead. In the second quarter, Graham McKeel scored on a touchdown plunge to put Florida up 7–6, which was the score at halftime.

Georgia Tech was deep in Florida territory in the third quarter when Bobby Downs intercepted a pass from King to give Florida the ball on their own six. On the next play, sophomore tailback Larry Smith broke free and ran 94 yards for a touchdown to give Florida a 14–6 lead.

In the fourth quarter, McKeel ran for another touchdown to make it 21–6; Larry Good scored from 25 yards out for the Yellow Jackets to close the gap to 21–12. Florida's Jack Coons caught a five-yard pass from Harmon Wages to end the scoring at 27–12, but that was the end of the scoring. Smith ran for 187 yards and was named the game's outstanding player.

=== Scoring ===
First quarter

- Ga Tech – Craig Baynham 10-yard pass from Kim King (run failed)

Second quarter

- Florida – Graham McKeel 1-yard run (Wayne Barfield kick)

Third quarter

- Florida – Larry Smith 94-yard run (Barfield kick)

Fourth quarter

- Florida – McKeel 1-yard run (Barfield kick)
- Ga Tech – Larry Good 25-yard run (pass failed)
- Florida – Jack Coons 5-yard pass from Harmon Wages (pass failed)

== Statistics ==
Statistics	Ga. Tech	Florida
First downs	17	22
Rushes–yards	46–197	48–284
Passing yards	122	165
Passes (C–A–I)	8–22–4	15–32–1
Total offense	68–319	80–449
Punts–average	6–42.3	7–36.1
Fumbles–lost	2–1	1–1
Turnovers	5	2
Penalties–yards	5–41	4–32

== Aftermath ==
Dodd retired after the game, though he stayed as athletic director at Georgia Tech until 1976. The Yellow Jackets returned to the Orange Bowl in 2010, and the Gators in 1999. Florida's next major bowl game was eight years later in the Sugar Bowl against Nebraska, while Georgia Tech did not play in another major bowl until the Orange in 2010.

In the previous thirteen Orange Bowls, a Big Eight Conference team was a participant twelve times. This was the last edition without the Big Eight for seven years, when Penn State defeated LSU in January 1974.

Both final polls were released prior to the bowl games.
