= Fred Hyatt =

American football player (1946–2022)

No. 88, 40
- Position: Wide receiver

Personal information
- Born: June 28, 1946; Roanoke, Alabama, U.S.
- Died: June 27, 2022 (aged 75); Ocala, Florida, U.S.
- Listed height: 6 ft 3 in (1.91 m)
- Listed weight: 200 lb (91 kg)

Career information
- High school: Sylacauga (Sylacauga, Alabama)
- College: Auburn
- NFL draft: 1968: 2nd round, 40th overall pick

Career history
- St. Louis Cardinals (1968–1972); New Orleans Saints (1973); Washington Redskins (1973)

Awards and highlights
- 2× Second-team All-SEC (1966, 1967)

Career NFL statistics
- Receptions: 6
- Receiving yards: 90
- Return yards: 41
- Stats at Pro Football Reference

Freddie Phillip Hyatt (June 28, 1946 – June 27, 2022) was an American football wide receiver in the National Football League (NFL) for the St. Louis Cardinals, New Orleans Saints, and Washington Redskins. He played college football at Auburn University and was drafted 40th overall by the Cardinals in the second round of the 1968 NFL/AFL draft. Hyatt died of open heart surgery in Ocala, Florida just one day before his 76th birthday.
