= Harmon Wages =

American football player (born 1946)

No. 5
- Position: Running back

Personal information
- Born: May 18, 1946 (age 80); Jacksonville, Florida, U.S.
- Listed height: 6 ft 1 in (1.85 m)
- Listed weight: 215 lb (98 kg)

Career information
- High school: Lee (Jacksonville)
- College: Florida
- NFL draft: 1968: undrafted

Career history
- Atlanta Falcons (1968–1971, 1973)

Career NFL statistics
- Rushing yards: 1,321
- Rushing average: 4
- Receptions: 85
- Receiving yards: 765
- Passing yards: 50
- Total touchdowns: 10
- Stats at Pro Football Reference

Harmon Leon Wages (born May 18, 1946) is an American former professional football player who was a running back for five seasons in the National Football League (NFL) during the 1960s and 1970s. He played college football for the Florida Gators football and, thereafter, played professionally for the Atlanta Falcons of the NFL.

== Early life ==
Wages was born in Jacksonville, Florida, in 1946. He attended Robert E. Lee High School in Jacksonville, where he was a standout quarterback for the Lee Generals high school football team. In two years as the Generals' starting quarterback, Wages led his team to 8–2 and 7–3 records. After rushing for nearly 900 yards as a senior, he was named to the all-city and all-state teams.

== College career ==
Wages accepted an athletic scholarship to attend the University of Florida in Gainesville, Florida, where he was a quarterback for coach Ray Graves' Gators teams from 1965 to 1967. He was a backup behind Steve Spurrier in 1965 and 1966, and was the periodic starter as a senior in 1967. Wages graduated from University of Florida with a bachelor's degree in business administration in 1969.

== Professional career ==
Wages was an undrafted free agent in 1968 when the Atlanta Falcons signed him, and he played for the Falcons from 1968 to 1971 and again in 1973. He was the Falcons' second-string halfback and third-string quarterback. With an injury to the Falcons' starting halfback, Wages began to see playing time. In a single game against the New Orleans Saints played on December 7, 1969, he ran for a 66-yard touchdown, caught an 88-yard reception for a second touchdown, and threw a 16-yard pass for a third touchdown, and the Falcons defeated the Saints 45–17. The three-touchdown day by a single player—one rushing, one receiving and one passing—is one of only seven such "hat trick" performances in the history of the NFL.

Wages finished his five-year NFL career with 332 carries for 1,321 yards and five touchdowns, eighty-five receptions for 765 yards and five touchdowns, and three pass completions in four attempts for fifty yards and a single touchdown.

== Life after football ==
Wages became a sportscaster for WAGA-TV, then a CBS affiliate (now a Fox-owned station) in Atlanta, Georgia, and then WXIA-TV, Atlanta's NBC affiliate. Wages was convicted in Federal court in Atlanta for misdemeanor possession of cocaine in 1985, and spent three months in prison. He returned to sports broadcasting at WTLV-TV, the NBC affiliate in Jacksonville, Florida, and current CBS affiliate WGNX-TV (now WANF) in Atlanta.

Wages currently serves as an advisory member of the board of directors of the Police Athletic League of Jacksonville.

Wages' 2022 autobiography, Harmon Wages:The Butcher's Boy, was written by Harmon Wages and Stan Awtrey, edited by Martha Kavanaugh Hunt. A portion of net proceeds goes to The Dave Thomas Foundation for Adoption.

== See also ==
- Florida Gators football, 1960–69
- History of the Atlanta Falcons
- List of Florida Gators in the NFL draft
- List of University of Florida alumni
