= List of Florida Gators baseball seasons =

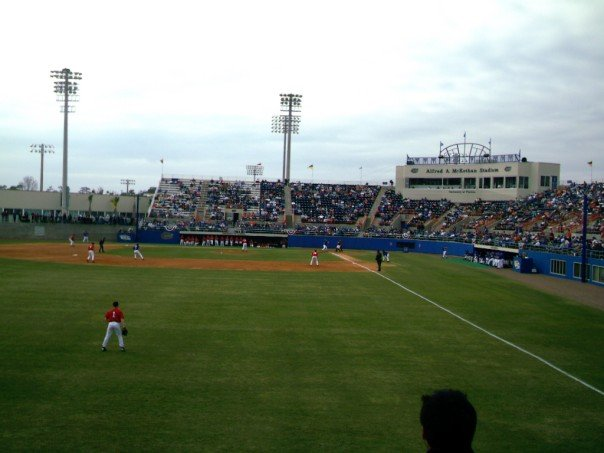
Alfred A. McKethan Stadium

The Florida Gators baseball team represents the University of Florida located in Gainesville, Florida. The Gators compete in Division I of the National Collegiate Athletic Association (NCAA) and the Eastern Division of the Southeastern Conference (SEC).

This is a list of Florida Gators baseball seasons that presents the season-by-season win–loss records of the Gators baseball team from its founding in 1912 to the present, including NCAA tournament records.

== Season results ==
NCAA tournament champions	CWS Appearance	NCAA tournament appearance	SEC Tournament champions	SEC regular season champions

Season	League	Conference	Division	Head coach	Regular season			NCAA tournament Result
Season	League	Conference	Division	Head coach	Wins	Losses	Ties	NCAA tournament Result
Florida Gators
1912	NCAA	SIAA		H. D. McLeod	9	4	2	
1913	NCAA	SIAA		R. P. Hoffman	11	9	1	
1914	NCAA	SIAA		Pat Flaherty	2	8	0	
1915	NCAA	SIAA		Pat Flaherty	4	6	1	
1916	NCAA	SIAA		Pat Flaherty	9	14	0	
1917	NCAA	SIAA		Hugh Wicher	8	3	0	
1918	No games played							
1919	NCAA	SIAA		Artie Phelan	7	5	0	
1920	NCAA	SIAA		Artie Phelan	7	11	1	
1921	NCAA	SIAA		William G. Kline	4	10	0	
1922	NCAA	SoCon		Lance Richbourg	15	5	0	
1923	NCAA	SoCon		Lance Richbourg	10	9	0	
1924	NCAA	SoCon		Rex Farrior	5	14	0	
1925	NCAA	SoCon		James White	3	6	0	
1926	NCAA	SoCon		Lance Richbourg	14	7	0	
1927	NCAA	SoCon		Brady Cowell	8	14	0	
1928	NCAA	SoCon		Brady Cowell	6	14	1	
1929	NCAA	SoCon		Brady Cowell	4	9	0	
1930	NCAA	SoCon		Brady Cowell	9	8	0	
1931	NCAA	SoCon		Brady Cowell	11	10	0	
1932	NCAA	SoCon		Brady Cowell	12	8	0	
1933	NCAA	SEC		Brady Cowell	11	2	1	
1934	NCAA	SEC		Ben Clemons	6	7	0	
1935	NCAA	SEC		Ben Clemons	7	13	1	
1936	NCAA	SEC		Ben Clemons	7	9	0	
1937	NCAA	SEC		Lew Hardage	10	7	1	
1938	NCAA	SEC		Lew Hardage	14	9	0	
1939	NCAA	SEC		Lew Hardage	11	8	0	
1940	NCAA	SEC		Sam J. McAllister	8	11	2	
1941	NCAA	SEC		Sam J. McAllister	8	7	0	
1942	NCAA	SEC		Sam J. McAllister	6	6	0	
1943	No Games played due to World War II							
1944	No Games played due to World War II							
1945	NCAA	SEC		Bob Pittman	2	9	0	
1946	NCAA	SEC		Sam J. McAllister	4	17	2	
1947	NCAA	SEC		Sam J. McAllister	14	15	0	
1948	NCAA	SEC		Dave Fuller	10	14	1	
1949	NCAA	SEC		Dave Fuller	17	13	0	
1950	NCAA	SEC		Dave Fuller	20	9	0	
1951	NCAA	SEC		Dave Fuller	16	9	0	
1952	NCAA	SEC		Dave Fuller	21	4	2	
1953	NCAA	SEC		Dave Fuller	13	7	1	
1954	NCAA	SEC		Dave Fuller	12	10	0	
1955	NCAA	SEC		Dave Fuller	8	12	0	
1956	NCAA	SEC		Dave Fuller	20	4	0	
1957	NCAA	SEC		Dave Fuller	13	11	0	
1958	NCAA	SEC		Dave Fuller	17	7	0	2–2 in District 3
1959	NCAA	SEC		Dave Fuller	13	8	0	
1960	NCAA	SEC		Dave Fuller	18	14	0	2–2 in District 3
1961	NCAA	SEC		Dave Fuller	19	9	0	
1962	NCAA	SEC		Dave Fuller	25	10	1	1–3 in District 3
1963	NCAA	SEC		Dave Fuller	25	10	1	
1964	NCAA	SEC		Dave Fuller	30	9	0	
1965	NCAA	SEC		Dave Fuller	20	13	0	
1966	NCAA	SEC		Dave Fuller	23	12	0	
1967	NCAA	SEC		Dave Fuller	28	8	0	
1968	NCAA	SEC		Dave Fuller	25	13	0	
1969	NCAA	SEC		Dave Fuller	28	16	0	
1970	NCAA	SEC		Dave Fuller	27	17	0	
1971	NCAA	SEC		Dave Fuller	19	26	0	
1972	NCAA	SEC		Dave Fuller	23	21	0	
1973	NCAA	SEC		Dave Fuller	23	21	0	
1974	NCAA	SEC		Dave Fuller	23	20	1	
1975	NCAA	SEC		Dave Fuller	23	25	0	
1976	NCAA	SEC		Jay Bergman	21	27	0	
1977	NCAA	SEC		Jay Bergman	39	18	0	2–2 in Mideast Regional
1978	NCAA	SEC		Jay Bergman	34	15	0	
1979	NCAA	SEC		Jay Bergman	40	20	0	2–2 in East Regional
1980	NCAA	SEC		Jay Bergman	40	16	0	
1981	NCAA	SEC		Jay Bergman	42	17	0	3–2 in South Regional
1982	NCAA	SEC		Jack Rhine	34	25	1	0–2 in Atlantic Regional
1983	NCAA	SEC		Jack Rhine	38	14	0	
1984	NCAA	SEC		Joe Arnold	43	16	1	0–2 in South I Regional
1985	NCAA	SEC		Joe Arnold	43	18	0	3–2 in Atlantic Regional
1986	NCAA	SEC		Joe Arnold	27	26	0	
1987	NCAA	SEC		Joe Arnold	32	24	0	
1988	NCAA	SEC		Joe Arnold	48	19	1	1–2 in College World Series
1989	NCAA	SEC		Joe Arnold	44	22	0	1–2 in East Regional
1990	NCAA	SEC		Joe Arnold	29	30	0	
1991	NCAA	SEC		Joe Arnold	51	21	0	2–2 in College World Series
1992	NCAA	SEC	Eastern	Joe Arnold	44	20	0	1–2 in East Regional
1993	NCAA	SEC	Eastern	Joe Arnold	33	25	0	
1994	NCAA	SEC	Eastern	Joe Arnold	40	23	0	3–2 in Atlantic I Regional
1995	NCAA	SEC	Eastern	Andy Lopez	32	24	0	
1996	NCAA	SEC	Eastern	Andy Lopez	50	18	0	2–2 in College World Series
1997	NCAA	SEC	Eastern	Andy Lopez	40	24	0	2–2 in Atlantic Regional
1998	NCAA	SEC	Eastern	Andy Lopez	46	18	0	0–2 in College World Series
1999	NCAA	SEC	Eastern	Andy Lopez	31	25	0	
2000	NCAA	SEC	Eastern	Andy Lopez	44	23	1	2–2 in Waco Regional
2001	NCAA	SEC	Eastern	Andy Lopez	35	27	0	1–2 in Coral Gables Regional
2002	NCAA	SEC	Eastern	Pat McMahon	46	19	0	3–2 in Gainesville Regional
2003	NCAA	SEC	Eastern	Pat McMahon	37	21	1	3–2 in Coral Gables Regional
2004	NCAA	SEC	Eastern	Pat McMahon	43	22	0	0–2 in Coral Gables Super Regional
2005	NCAA	SEC	Eastern	Pat McMahon	48	23	0	College World Series runner-up
2006	NCAA	SEC	Eastern	Pat McMahon	28	28	0	
2007	NCAA	SEC	Eastern	Pat McMahon	29	30	0	
2008	NCAA	SEC	Eastern	Kevin O'Sullivan	34	24	0	0–2 in Tallahassee Regional
2009	NCAA	SEC	Eastern	Kevin O'Sullivan	42	22	0	0–2 Gainesville Super Regional
2010	NCAA	SEC	Eastern	Kevin O'Sullivan	47	17	0	0–2 in College World Series
2011	NCAA	SEC	Eastern	Kevin O'Sullivan	53	19	0	College World Series runner-up
2012	NCAA	SEC	Eastern	Kevin O'Sullivan	47	20	0	0–2 in College World Series
2013	NCAA	SEC	Eastern	Kevin O'Sullivan	29	30	0	0–2 in Bloomington Regional
2014	NCAA	SEC	Eastern	Kevin O'Sullivan	40	23	0	0–2 Gainesville Regional
2015	NCAA	SEC	Eastern	Kevin O'Sullivan	52	18	0	3–2 in College World Series
2016	NCAA	SEC	Eastern	Kevin O'Sullivan	52	16	0	0–2 in College World Series
2017	NCAA	SEC	Eastern	Kevin O'Sullivan	52	19	0	College World Series champions
2018	NCAA	SEC	Eastern	Kevin O'Sullivan	49	21	0	2–2 in College World Series
2019	NCAA	SEC	Eastern	Kevin O'Sullivan	34	26	0	1–2 in Lubbock Regional
2020	NCAA	SEC	Eastern	Kevin O'Sullivan	16	1	0	Remainder of season canceled due to COVID-19 pandemic
2021	NCAA	SEC	Eastern	Kevin O'Sullivan	38	22	0	0–2 in Gainesville Regional
2022	NCAA	SEC	Eastern	Kevin O'Sullivan	42	24	0	3–2 in Gainesville Regional
2023	NCAA	SEC	Eastern	Kevin O'Sullivan	54	17	0	College World Series runner-up
2024	NCAA	SEC	Eastern	Kevin O'Sullivan	36	30	0	College World Series
2025	NCAA	SEC		Kevin O'Sullivan	39	22	0	1–2 in Conway Regional
2026	NCAA	SEC		Kevin O'Sullivan	41	21	0	2–2 in Gainesville Regional
Total					2,866	1,733	24	(1906–2026, includes both regular season and tournament games)
