= Doug Corbett =

American baseball player (born 1952)

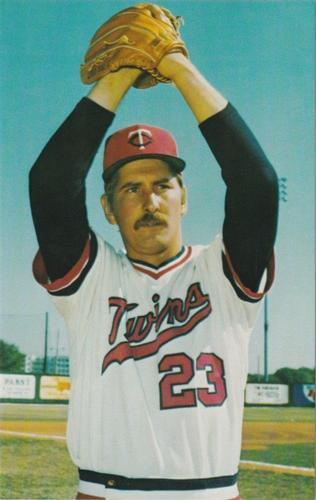
- Pitcher
- Born: November 4, 1952 (age 73); Sarasota, Florida, U.S.
- Batted: Right Threw: Right

MLB debut
- April 10, 1980, for the Minnesota Twins

Last MLB appearance
- July 30, 1987, for the Baltimore Orioles

MLB statistics
- Win–loss record: 24–30
- Earned run average: 3.32
- Strikeouts: 343
- Saves: 66
- Stats at Baseball Reference

Teams
- Minnesota Twins (1980–1982); California Angels (1982–1986); Baltimore Orioles (1987)

Career highlights and awards
- All-Star (1981)

Douglas Mitchell Corbett (born November 4, 1952) is an American former Major League Baseball (MLB) relief pitcher who played for the Minnesota Twins, California Angels and Baltimore Orioles between 1980 and 1987.

== Playing career ==
=== Amateur career ===
Corbett was born in Sarasota, Florida, in 1952. He attended Sarasota High School, and played high school baseball for the Sarasota Sailors.

Corbett accepted an athletic scholarship to attend the University of Florida in Gainesville, Florida, where he played for coach Dave Fuller's Florida Gators baseball team from 1971 to 1974. In 1972, he played collegiate summer baseball with the Harwich Mariners of the Cape Cod Baseball League and was named a league all-star. He was a recognized as a first-team All-Southeastern Conference selection as a pitcher in 1974. Corbett graduated from the University of Florida with a bachelor's degree in exercise and sport science in 1974, and was inducted into the University of Florida Athletic Hall of Fame as a "Gator Great" in 1996.

=== Professional career ===
In his rookie season with the Twins, Corbett saved 23 games and placed third in the Major League Baseball Rookie of the Year Award voting in the American League. The following year, he was elected to the American League All-Star team.

Corbett suffered a major knee injury prior to the 1988 season, ending his playing career. He was the pitching coach for the Florida Gators in 1988. Corbett attempted a comeback, serving as a replacement player for the Atlanta Braves in 1995 during the MLB strike. At the time, he was the pitching coach for Jacksonville University.

== See also ==
- Florida Gators
- List of Florida Gators baseball players
- List of University of Florida alumni
- List of University of Florida Athletic Hall of Fame members
