= Chip Healy =

American football player (1947–2019)

No. 56
- Position: Linebacker

Personal information
- Born: August 16, 1947; Atlanta, Georgia, U.S.
- Died: October 8, 2019 (aged 72); Nashville, Tennessee, U.S.
- Listed height: 6 ft 2 in (1.88 m)
- Listed weight: 235 lb (107 kg)

Career information
- High school: Baylor School (Chattanooga, Tennessee)
- College: Vanderbilt (1965-1968)
- NFL draft: 1969: 3rd round, 71st overall pick

Career history
- St. Louis Cardinals (1969–1970)

Awards and highlights
- First-team All-American (1968); First-team All-SEC (1966)

Career NFL statistics
- Sacks: 1
- Stats at Pro Football Reference

William Raymond "Chip" Healy Jr. (August 16, 1947 – October 8, 2019) was an American professional football player who was a linebacker for the St. Louis Cardinals of the National Football League (NFL). He played college football for the Vanderbilt Commodores.

After retiring from football in 1970, Healy moved around Tennessee working for his father's brokerage business, before retiring in 1987. Since 2001, he operated Transitional Living in Nashville, Tennessee, known as "Chip's Place", a treatment and living facility for men struggling with alcoholism, which initially included Healy himself.

A devout Christian, Healy lived in Nashville and had two children. His nephew Will Healy was the head football coach at East Tennessee State.

Chip Healy died in Nashville on October 8, 2019, at the age of 72.
