= Chuck Hinton (offensive lineman) =

American football player (1942–2025)

No. 56, 59
- Position: Center

Personal information
- Born: December 6, 1942; Buffalo, Mississippi, U.S.
- Died: June 21, 2025 (aged 82); Flowood, Mississippi, U.S.
- Listed height: 6 ft 2 in (1.88 m)
- Listed weight: 235 lb (107 kg)

Career information
- High school: Crosby (Crosby, Mississippi)
- College: Ole Miss
- NFL draft: 1964: 15th round, 208th overall pick

Career history
- New York Giants (1967–1969)

Awards and highlights
- Second-team All-SEC (1966)
- Stats at Pro Football Reference

Charles Richard Hinton (December 6, 1942 – June 21, 2025) was an American professional football center who played for the New York Giants of the National Football League (NFL). He played college football for the Ole Miss Rebels and was selected by the Giants in the 15th round of the 1964 NFL draft.

== Early life ==
Charles Richard Hinton was born on December 6, 1942, in Buffalo, Mississippi. He graduated from Crosby High School in Crosby, Mississippi in 1960.

== College career ==
In 1960, Hinton accepted an athletic scholarship to attend the University of Mississippi and play college football for the Rebels. However, he then spent two years in the United States Navy. He redshirted the 1962 season and did not play in a varsity game in 1963 either. Hinton was then a three-year varsity letterman from 1964 to 1966. He was a team captain in 1966 and earned Associated Press second-team All-SEC honors at center. He played in the 1966 East-West Shrine Game.

== Professional career ==
Hinton was selected by the New York Giants in the 15th round, with the 208th overall pick, of the 1964 NFL draft and by the San Diego Chargers in the 22nd round, with the 176th overall pick, of the 1964 AFL draft. At the conclusion of his college career, he signed with the Giants in April 1967. He played in 32 games as a reserve center for the Giants from 1967 to 1969. He was waived on September 9, 1970.

== Personal life ==
Hinton worked for Union National Insurance in Natchez, Mississippi, from 1971 to 1976. He then worked for Schlumberger until retiring in 1997. He owned and operated the One Stop Package Store from 1995 to 2012. Hinton died on June 21, 2025, at The Blake in Flowood, Mississippi.
