= Dave Fuller =

American baseball coach (1915–2009)

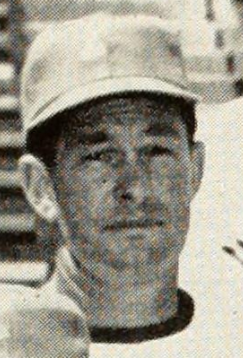
- Fuller, c. 1956

Biographical details
- Born: 1915
- Died: September 15, 2009 (aged 94); Gainesville, Florida, U.S.

Playing career
- 1933–1937: Wake Forest
- Positions: Fullback, tailback

Coaching career (HC unless noted)

Football
- 1943: Northwest Missouri State (Asst.)
- 1947–1976: Florida (Asst.)

Baseball
- 1948–1975: Florida

Head coaching record
- Overall: 557–354–6 (.611)

Accomplishments and honors

Championships
- SEC (1952, 1956, 1962)

Records
- Winningest coach in Florida Gators history University of Florida Athletic Hall of Fame

Dave Fuller (1915 – September 15, 2009) was an American college baseball coach who led the Florida Gators baseball team of the University of Florida for twenty-eight seasons.

== Early life and education ==
Fuller attended Wake Forest University in Wake Forest, North Carolina, where he played for the Wake Forest Demon Deacons football, Demon Deacons basketball and Demon Deacons baseball teams. He was a three-year letterman in all three sports, but achieved his greatest recognition as a fullback and tailback for the Demon Deacons.

== Transition from player to coach ==
After graduating from Wake Forest, Fuller played minor league baseball in the Dixie League and Coastal Plain League. As he repeatedly recounted for friends, his inability to hit the curve ball led to the early end of his professional baseball career. Fuller tried his hand at coaching, first as the head football, basketball and baseball coach at Perquimans County High School in Hertford, North Carolina from 1940 to 1942, and then as an assistant football coach for the backfield at Northwest Missouri State Teacher's College in Maryville, Missouri in 1943. After coaching in the U.S. Navy's sports leadership program during World War II, he joined the University of Florida's physical education staff in 1946.

== Major college coaching career ==
Fuller was the head coach of the Florida Gators baseball team from 1948 to 1975, serving longer and winning more games than any other coach in the history of the Florida Gators intercollegiate sports program. His Gators baseball teams compiled an overall win–loss–tie record of 557–354–6 (.611), won four Southeastern Conference (SEC) Eastern Division titles and three SEC championships (1952, 1956, 1962), and made three appearances in the NCAA baseball tournament (1958, 1960, 1962). Fuller coached forty-seven All-SEC players, including the first three All-Americans in the history of the Gators baseball program, Bernie Parrish, Perry McGriff and Tom Moore. Eight of his Gators played Major League Baseball, including Dennis Aust, Ross Baumgarten, Doug Corbett, Roger Holt, Bernie Parrish, Haywood Sullivan, Dale Willis and Casey Wise.

Fuller was also an assistant coach for the Florida Gators football team for twenty-nine seasons from 1947 to 1976 under four different head coaches—Raymond Wolf, Bob Woodruff, Ray Graves and Doug Dickey. He served longer than any other assistant coach in school history, including as the head coach of the Gators freshman football team known as the "Baby Gators," varsity assistant, head scout and a key recruiter. Fuller was personally responsible for recruiting Doug Dickey, who later became the starting quarterback, the Gators head football coach and a member of the College Football Hall of Fame, and also Jack Youngblood, who was recognized as a first-team All-American and a member of the Pro Football Hall of Fame.

== Legacy ==
Fuller was inducted into the University of Florida Athletic Hall of Fame as an "honorary letter winner" in 1976. He died in Gainesville in 2009; he was 94 years old. Fuller and his wife Patricia had a daughter and three sons; all four of their children graduated from the University of Florida. One son played football and another was a two-time All-SEC baseball player for the Gators. Fuller's 557 career wins as the Gators head baseball coach remained the most in the history of the Florida Gators baseball program until Kevin O'Sullivan surpassed that total in 2021.

== See also ==
- Florida Gators
- History of the University of Florida
- List of Florida Gators baseball seasons
- List of University of Florida Athletic Hall of Fame members
- List of Wake Forest University people
- University Athletic Association
- Wake Forest Demon Deacons
