= 1966 All-SEC football team =

American college football all-star team

The 1966 All-SEC football team consists of American football players selected to the All-Southeastern Conference (SEC) chosen by various selectors for the 1966 NCAA University Division football season.

== Offensive selections ==
=== Receivers ===
- Ray Perkins, Alabama (AP-1, UPI)
- Richard Trapp, Florida (AP-1, UPI)
- Austin Denney, Tennessee (AP-2, UPI)
- Johnny Mills, Tennessee (AP-1)
- Fred Hyatt, Auburn (AP-2)
- Wayne Cook, Alabama (AP-2)

=== Tackles ===
- Cecil Dowdy, Alabama (AP-1, UPI)
- Edgar Chandler, Georgia (AP-1, UPI)
- Jerry Duncan, Alabama (AP-2)
- Bubba Hampton, Miss. St. (AP-2)

=== Guards ===
- Jim Benson, Florida (AP-2, UPI)
- Bob Johnson, Tennessee (AP-1)
- Don Hayes, Georgia (AP-1)
- Johnny Calvert, Alabama (UPI)
- Scott Hall, Vanderbilt (AP-2)

=== Centers ===
- Bill Carr, Florida (AP-1, UPI)
- Charles Hinton, Ole Miss (AP-2)

=== Quarterbacks ===
- Steve Spurrier, Florida (College Football Hall of Fame) (AP-1, UPI)
- Dewey Warren, Tennessee (AP-2)

=== Running backs ===
- Larry Smith, Florida (AP-1, UPI)
- Ronnie Jenkins, Georgia (AP-2, UPI)
- Doug Cunningham, Ole Miss (AP-1)
- Charlie Fulton, Tennessee (AP-2)

== Defensive selections ==
=== Ends ===
- Jerry Richardson, Ole Miss (AP-2, UPI)
- John Garlington, LSU (AP-1)
- Larry Kohn, Georgia (AP-1)
- Mike Robichaux, LSU (UPI)
- Jeff Van Note, Kentucky (AP-2)

=== Tackles ===
- George Patton, Georgia (AP-1, UPI)
- Jim Urbanek, Ole Miss(AP-1, UPI)

=== Middle guards ===
- Jimmy Keyes, Ole Miss (AP-1)
- Bobby Morel, Tennessee (AP-2)

=== Linebackers ===
- Paul Naumoff, Tennessee (AP-1, UPI)
- D. D. Lewis, Miss. St. (College Football Hall of Fame) (AP-1, UPI)
- Chip Healy, Vanderbilt (AP-2, UPI)
- George Bevan, LSU (AP-1)
- Gusty Yearout, Auburn (AP-2, UPI)
- Doug Archibald, Tennessee (AP-2)

=== Backs ===
- Lynn Hughes, Georgia (AP-1, UPI)
- Bobby Johns, Alabama (AP-1, UPI)
- Gerald Warfield, Ole Miss (AP-1)
- Dicky Thompson, Alabama (UPI)
- Dicky Lyons, Kentucky (AP-2)
- Jerry Davis, Kentucky (AP-2)
- Sammy Grezaffi, LSU (AP-2)

== Special teams ==
=== Kicker ===
- Bob Etter, Georgia (AP)

=== Punter ===
- Tommy Lanceford, Auburn (AP)

== Key ==
AP = Associated Press

UPI = United Press International

Bold = Consensus first-team selection by both AP and UPI

== See also ==
- 1966 College Football All-America Team
