= Wilkinson, Mississippi =

Unincorporated community in Mississippi, United States

Wilkinson
- Unincorporated community
- Location within the state of Mississippi
- Coordinates: 31°13′21″N 91°14′20″W
- Country: United States
- State: Mississippi
- County: Wilkinson
- Elevation: 135 ft (41 m)
- Time zone: UTC-6 (Central (CST))
  - Summer (DST): UTC-5 (CDT)
- GNIS feature ID: 695177

Wilkinson (also called Buffalo) is an unincorporated community in Wilkinson County, Mississippi, United States.

It is located on the north shore of the Buffalo River.
