= Larry Smith (running back) =

American football player (born 1947)

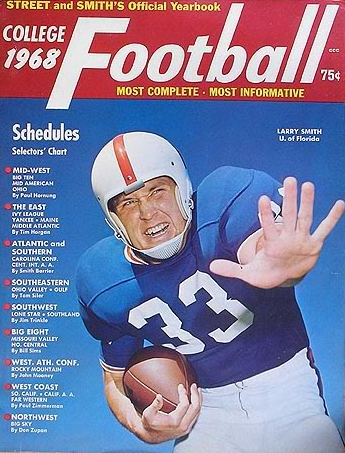
- Smith on 1968 cover of Street & Smith

No. 38, 33
- Position: Running back

Personal information
- Born: September 2, 1947 (age 79); Tampa, Florida, U.S.
- Listed height: 6 ft 3 in (1.91 m)
- Listed weight: 220 lb (100 kg)

Career information
- High school: Robinson (Tampa)
- College: Florida
- NFL draft: 1969: 1st round, 8th overall pick

Career history
- Los Angeles Rams (1969–1973); Washington Redskins (1974)

Awards and highlights
- First-team All-American (1968); 3× First-team All-SEC (1966, 1967, 1968); University of Florida Athletic Hall of Fame

Career NFL statistics
- Rushing yards: 2,057
- Rushing average: 3.9
- Receptions: 149
- Receiving yards: 1,176
- Total touchdowns: 16
- Stats at Pro Football Reference

William Lawrence Smith (born September 2, 1947) is an American former professional football player who was a running back for six seasons in the National Football League (NFL) during the 1960s and 1970s. Smith played college football for the Florida Gators, earning All-American honors. He was a first-round pick in the 1969 NFL/AFL draft, and played professionally for the Los Angeles Rams and Washington Redskins of the NFL.

== Early life ==
Smith was born in 1947 in Tampa, Florida, and attended Thomas Richard Robinson High School in Tampa. As a junior in 1963, Smith was the star running back on the Robinson Knights high school football team, and led his team to Florida's first-ever state championship football game before losing to the Coral Gables Cavaliers 16–14. He finished his high school career with forty-seven touchdowns, and received all-county, all-state, and Parade magazine high school All-American accolades. In 2007, forty-two years after he graduated from high school, the Florida High School Athletic Association (FHSAA) recognized Smith as one of the "100 Greatest Players of the First 100 Years" of Florida high school football.

== College career ==
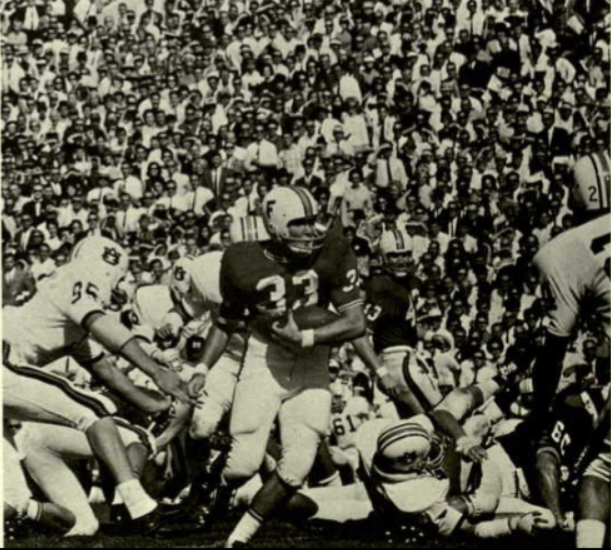
Smith (33) vs. Auburn, 1966

Smith accepted an athletic scholarship to attend the University of Florida in Gainesville, Florida, where he was a tailback for coach Ray Graves' Florida Gators football team from 1966 to 1968. Memorably, Smith had a 94-yard touchdown run in the Gators' 27–12 victory over the Georgia Tech Yellow Jackets in the 1967 Orange Bowl—while struggling to keep his pants up. His 187 yards rushing in the Orange Bowl resulted in him being named the game's "Outstanding Player." He finished his college football career with 528 carries for 2,186 yards and twenty-four rushing touchdowns, and 607 yards receiving. He was a first-team All-Southeastern Conference (SEC) selection in 1966, 1967 and 1968, and was a first-team All-American in 1968. Smith was also the recipient of the Gators' Fergie Ferguson Award, recognizing the "senior football player who displays outstanding leadership, character and courage."

Smith graduated from Florida with a bachelor's degree in business administration in 1970, and was inducted into the University of Florida Athletic Hall of Fame as a "Gator Great" in 1983. In a 2006 article series written for The Gainesville Sun, he was recognized as No. 29 among the top 100 Gator players from the first 100 years of Florida football.

== Professional career ==
Smith was selected in the first round (eighth overall) of the 1969 NFL Draft by the Los Angeles Rams, and played for the Rams from 1969 to 1973 and the Washington Redskins in 1974. His rookie year with the Rams was his most productive season: 599 yards rushing and 300 yards receiving. After five seasons with the Rams, he was traded to the Redskins in 1974 as part of coach George Allen's effort to rebuild the Redskins with experienced players. He received few carries with the Redskins, however, accumulating only 149 yards in seven games, with no touchdowns. In his six NFL seasons, Smith gained 2,057 yards rushing on 528 carries for eleven touchdowns; he also had 149 receptions for 1,176 yards receiving and five touchdowns.

== NFL career statistics ==
Legend
**Bold**	Career high

=== Regular season ===
Year	Team	Games		Rushing					Receiving				
Year	Team	GP	GS	Att	Yds	Avg	Lng	TD	Rec	Yds	Avg	Lng	TD
1969	RAM	14	14	**166**	**599**	3.6	46	1	**46**	300	6.5	38	**2**
1970	RAM	11	9	77	338	4.4	19	1	24	164	6.8	17	1
1971	RAM	14	6	91	404	4.4	64	**5**	31	**324**	10.5	34	0
1972	RAM	12	3	60	276	**4.6**	**68**	2	15	186	**12.4**	**47**	1
1973	RAM	14	2	79	291	3.7	16	2	10	65	6.5	11	0
1974	WAS	7	6	55	149	2.7	13	0	23	137	6.0	14	1
		72	40	528	2,057	3.9	68	11	149	1,176	7.9	47	5

=== Playoffs ===
Year	Team	Games		Rushing					Receiving				
Year	Team	GP	GS	Att	Yds	Avg	Lng	TD	Rec	Yds	Avg	Lng	TD
1969	RAM	1	1	**11**	**60**	**5.5**	**12**	0	**6**	**36**	6.0	**10**	0
1973	RAM	1	0	2	-7	-3.5	-1	0	2	13	**6.5**	9	0
		2	1	13	53	4.1	12	0	8	49	6.1	10	0

== Life after football ==
Smith returned to the University of Florida to earn a master's degree in business administration in 1975. In 1982, he graduated from the Stetson University College of Law with a J.D. degree, and is now a commercial real estate attorney with the Tampa law firm of Hill, Ward & Henderson.

Smith is married, and he and his wife have two daughters and a son.

== See also ==
- 1968 College Football All-America Team
- Florida Gators football, 1960–69
- List of Florida Gators football All-Americans
- List of Florida Gators in the NFL draft
- List of Los Angeles Rams first-round draft picks
- List of Los Angeles Rams players
- List of University of Florida alumni
- List of University of Florida Athletic Hall of Fame members
- List of Washington Redskins players
