= Ray Graves =

American football player and coach (1918–2015)

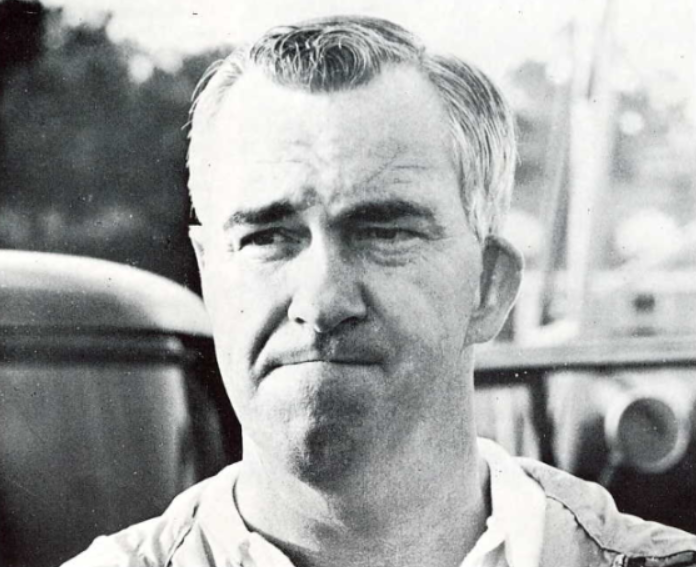
- Graves in 1965

Biographical details
- Born: December 31, 1918; Knoxville, Tennessee, U.S.
- Died: April 10, 2015 (aged 96); Clearwater, Florida, U.S.

Playing career
- 1939–1941: Tennessee
- 1942: Philadelphia Eagles
- 1943: Phil./Pitt. Steagles
- 1946: Philadelphia Eagles
- Position: Center / Linebacker

Coaching career (HC unless noted)
- 1944–1945: Tennessee (line)
- 1946–1950: Philadelphia Eagles (line coach / scout)
- 1951–1959: Georgia Tech (assistant)
- 1960–1969: Florida

Administrative career (AD unless noted)
- 1960–1979: Florida

Head coaching record
- Overall: 70–31–4
- Bowls: 4–1

Accomplishments and honors

Awards
- SEC Coach of the Year (1960); University of Florida Athletic Hall of Fame; Florida–Georgia Hall of Fame
- College Football Hall of Fame; Inducted in 1990 (profile)

Samuel Ray Graves (December 31, 1918 – April 10, 2015) was an American professional football player and college football coach. He was a native of Tennessee and a graduate of the University of Tennessee, where he was the starting center and team captain for the Volunteers under head coach Robert Neyland. After playing in the National Football League (NFL) for three seasons, he returned to Tennessee to serve as an assistant football coach, then left for a longer stint as an assistant at Georgia Tech under head coach Bobby Dodd. He was the head football coach at the University of Florida from 1960 until 1969, where he led the Gators to their most successful decade in program history up to that point. While at Florida, he recruited and coached Heisman Trophy-winning quarterback Steve Spurrier, who often praised Graves as a role model and mentor during his own successful coaching career. Graves also served as Florida's athletic director from 1960 until his retirement in 1979.

== Early life and education ==
Graves was born in Knoxville, Tennessee, on December 31, 1918. He was the son of a Methodist minister, and the Graves family often moved as his father took various pastorships in eastern Tennessee. In high school, he realized that his best (and perhaps only) opportunity to attend college would be to earn an athletic scholarship, so he worked hard at both football and academics while attending Central High School in Dayton, Tennessee.

Graves married Opal Richardson on November 3, 1942, and they had three daughters.

== Playing career ==
=== College ===
Upon graduation from high school, Graves earned a scholarship at from Tennessee Wesleyan Junior College, a small Methodist-affiliated institution in Athens, Tennessee. Graves attended Wesleyan for a year, then received a scholarship offer from Duke University coach Wallace Wade, which he accepted. Before enrolling at Duke, however, Graves received a scholarship offer from Tennessee coach Robert Neyland and choose to stay in state to play for the well-regarded Volunteers.

Graves was a starter on the offensive line and at linebacker for the 1939 Tennessee team which was undefeated and unscored upon during the regular season and was invited to the Rose Bowl. The Vols played in the Sugar Bowl following his junior season, and Graves was the starting center and team captain during his senior year of 1941, earning third-team All-Southeastern Conference (SEC) honors.

Graves would later credit Neyland's insistence that all players learn the assignments of every position on the field for helping him to understand the game and become a better coach, though he did not try to imitate Neyland's aloof and highly disciplined coaching style.

=== Professional playing career ===
With the nation embroiled in World War II, Graves attempted to enlist in the United States Navy after graduating from Tennessee in 1942. However, he was rejected for service when a physical examination revealed a congenital hearing problem, and he was classified as 4-F, meaning that he would not be called to active duty except in a dire manpower emergency.

The Philadelphia Eagles selected Graves in the ninth round (seventy-third pick overall) of the 1942 NFL draft, and he ended a brief stint as a high school football coach to play professionally. He played offensive line and linebacker for the Eagles during the 1942 and 1943 seasons, including the temporary merger of the Eagles and the Pittsburgh Steelers known as the "Steagles." (The Steagles were formed when the league had to limit rosters and cut back to eight teams in 1943 because of manpower shortages during World War II.)

Graves left the Eagles to serve as an assistant coach at Tennessee in 1944 and 1945, but he returned to the pro franchise as an assistant coach and scout in 1946. The Eagles lost several lineman due to injury that season, so Graves volunteered to briefly resume his playing career and appeared in seven games. Overall, Graves played in 28 games (including 15 starts) during his professional career.

== Coaching career ==
=== Assistant ===
==== Tennessee ====
Graves had seriously considered an offer to coach the Tennessee Volunteers' offensive line in 1943, but when the school did not field a football team that season due to World War II, he continued to play pro football. After two seasons in the NFL, Graves returned to Knoxville to become the Volunteers' line coach in 1944.

In 1946, Graves returned to the Eagles to serve as a scout and assistant line coach, though he was pressed back into action as a player due to a rash of injuries.

==== Georgia Tech ====
Graves returned to the college ranks as a defensive assistant at Georgia Tech under head coach Bobby Dodd. Under Dodd, Graves and offensive coach Frank Broyles, the Yellow Jackets won Southeastern Conference championships in 1951 and 1952, the 1951 Orange Bowl, the 1952 Sugar Bowl and the 1952 national championship. Graves is widely credited with creating what was then known as the "monster defense"—the modern alignment of the free safety and strong safety in the defensive backfield—while coaching under Dodd. In turn, Graves credited Dodd with serving as his role model of a "player's coach" who built relationships with players and coaches to get the most out of his team.

=== Head coach and administrator ===
==== Florida ====
Steve Spurrier and Ray Graves.

In 1960, Graves was hired as head football coach of the University of Florida, replacing fellow Tennessee alumnus Bob Woodruff. He served as the Gators' head coach for ten years from 1960 to 1969. Graves led Florida to five bowl appearances and he coached several outstanding players, including quarterback and Heisman Trophy recipient Steve Spurrier (1964–1966), running back and future NFL first-round draft pick Larry Smith (1966–1968) and defensive end and Pro Football Hall of Fame inductee Jack Youngblood (1968–1970).

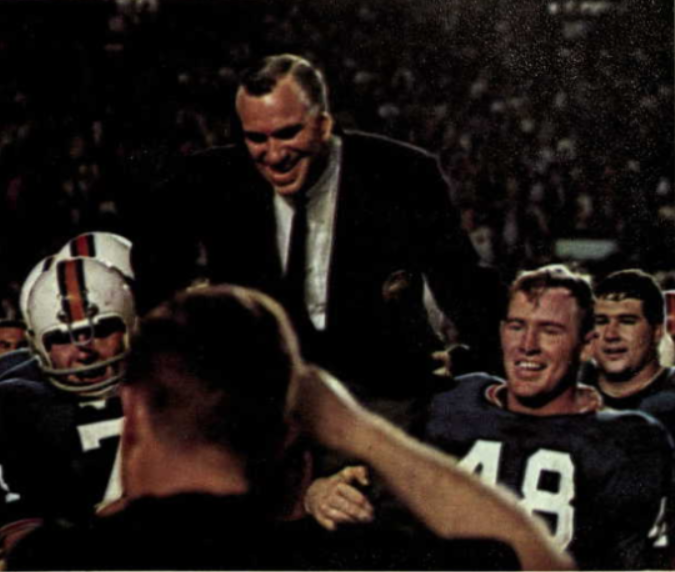
Graves carried off the field following 1967 Orange Bowl

Among the many highlights of the Graves era was the 1963 Gators' 10–6 upset victory over coach Bear Bryant's 1963 Alabama Crimson Tide in Tuscaloosa, Alabama. In one of the more interesting footnotes to his football legacy, Graves allowed Dr. Robert Cade, a professor in the University of Florida College of Medicine, to conduct dehydration analysis and rehydration experiments using team members which led to the formulation of Gatorade in 1965. After seeing the formula's potential in an intrasquad scrimmage, Graves asked Cade to make enough for the entire team for the next game against Louisiana State; the LSU Tigers wilted in the 102-degree game-day heat, and the Gators came from behind to win in the second half. He told his friend, Kansas City Chiefs head coach Hank Stram, of the drink's effectiveness, a move that eventually led to Gatorade becoming the official sports drink of the NFL.

Graves' best season in coaching was his last. His 1969 Gators posted a 9–1–1 record, upset the Tennessee Volunteers, 14–13, in the Gator Bowl, and were ranked fourteenth in the final AP Poll. After achieving an all-time win–loss record at Florida of 70–31–4 (.686) and four final top-twenty poll rankings (1960, 1965, 1966, 1969), Graves stepped down to make room for former Gators quarterback Doug Dickey to return to his alma mater as the new head coach of the 1970 Gators. Graves remained the winningest coach in Gators football history until his former quarterback, Steve Spurrier, surpassed him in 1996.

Ray Graves with UF president J. Wayne Reitz.

Graves' Gators are remembered for their remarkable academic success as much as their athletic success. Ninety-three percent of his players graduated, and more than half of the graduates ultimately earned law or medical degrees. Graves' "Silver Sixties" Gators remained a close-knit group, and they held an annual reunion with their former coach every year from 1970 until 2014, the year before he died.

After resigning as Florida's head football coach, Graves remained the university's athletic director until 1979, a position he had also held since becoming the football coach in 1960. His remaining tenure as athletic director was notable for the University of Florida embracing the challenges and opportunities in women's college sports presented by Title IX. After he was approached by Professor Dr. Ruth H. Alexander and other female coaches to fund women's athletics, their proposal was brought to the Faculty Committee on Intercollegiate Athletics who approved their budgeting plan for the 1972–73 season. Under Graves' guidance, Florida's women's sports program began its climb to become one of the top ten women's programs in Division I sports. After he retired as athletic director in 1979, he worked for another year as a special assistant for fundraising in the office of the university president.

Graves was inducted into the Florida Sports Hall of Fame in 1972, the University of Florida Athletic Hall of Fame in 1981, the Tennessee Sports Hall of Fame in 1990, and the College Football Hall of Fame in 1990. When Steve Spurrier returned to Gainesville as the Gators' head coach in 1990, he created the Ray Graves Trophy, an annual team MVP award selected by the players. The athletic office at the University of Florida's Ben Hill Griffin Stadium was named in honor of Graves during the 2005 season.

== Steagles 60th anniversary ==
On August 17, 2003, the Pittsburgh Steelers celebrated the sixtieth anniversary of the Steagles in pregame and halftime ceremonies for the 2003 season opener at Heinz Field. The Steelers recreated the era in their "Turn Back the Clock" ceremonies, including broadcasting in black and white on the Jumbotron and airing World War II footage during the national anthem. All live entertainment was done to reflect the 1940s.

Graves was on hand as six of the nine surviving members of that Steagles team were honored by the Steelers during halftime. During the festivities, the Steelers gave each of the six members a replica Steagles jersey. The jersey worn by Graves was returned to the team after the festivities. It was sold by the Steelers a month later to Bill Ponko, a private collector of sports memorabilia, to benefit a local charity.

== Later life ==
After resigning as the University of Florida's athletic director in 1980, Graves became vice president of Steinbrenner Enterprises in Tampa, Florida. He also served as a consultant to the Jacksonville Bulls of the United States Football League (USFL). Graves retired in 1989, and he continued to live in Tampa with his wife Opal. He died in nearby Clearwater on April 10, 2015, at the age of 96.

== Head coaching record ==
Year	Team	Overall	Conference	Standing	Bowl/playoffs	Coaches^{#}	AP^{°}
Florida Gators (Southeastern Conference) (1960–1969)
1960	Florida	9–2	5–1	2nd	W Gator	16	18
1961	Florida	4–5–1	3–3	6th			
1962	Florida	7–4	4–2	5th	W Gator		
1963	Florida	6–3–1	3–3–1	7th			
1964	Florida	7–3	4–2	T–2nd			
1965	Florida	7–4	4–2	T–3rd	L Sugar	12	
1966	Florida	9–2	5–1	3rd	W Orange	11	
1967	Florida	6–4	4–2	T–3rd			
1968	Florida	6–3–1	3–2–1	T–6th			
1969	Florida	9–1–1	3–1–1	4th	W Gator	17	14
Florida:		70–31–4	38–19–3				
Total:		70–31–4					
^{#}Rankings from final Coaches Poll.; ^{°}Rankings from final AP Poll.

== See also ==
- List of College Football Hall of Fame inductees (coaches)
- List of University of Tennessee people
