= Willie Jackson (American football) =

American football player and coach (born 1971)

No. 80, 88, 83
- Position: Wide receiver

Personal information
- Born: August 16, 1971 (age 55); Gainesville, Florida, U.S.
- Listed height: 6 ft 1 in (1.85 m)
- Listed weight: 212 lb (96 kg)

Career information
- High school: P. K. Yonge (Gainesville)
- College: Florida (1990–1993)
- NFL draft: 1994: 4th round, 109th overall pick
- Expansion draft: 1995: 11th round, 21st overall pick

Career history

Playing
- Dallas Cowboys (1994); Jacksonville Jaguars (1995–1997); Cincinnati Bengals (1998–1999); New Orleans Saints (2000–2001); Atlanta Falcons (2002); Washington Redskins (2002); Denver Broncos (2004)*
- * Offseason or practice squad member only

Coaching
- Orlando Apollos (2019) Wide receivers coach

Awards and highlights
- First-team All-SEC (1992); 2× Second-team All-SEC (1991, 1993); Florida–Georgia Hall of Fame; University of Florida Athletic Hall of Fame

Career NFL statistics
- Receptions: 284
- Receiving yards: 3,641
- Receiving touchdowns: 24
- Stats at Pro Football Reference

Willie Bernard Jackson Jr. (born August 16, 1971) is an American former professional football player who was a wide receiver in the National Football League (NFL) for the Dallas Cowboys, Jacksonville Jaguars, Cincinnati Bengals, New Orleans Saints, Atlanta Falcons and Washington Redskins. He played college football for the Florida Gators. As a football coach, he was the wide receivers coach for the Orlando Apollos of the Alliance of American Football (AAF).

== Early life ==
Jackson was born in Gainesville, Florida in 1971. He attended P. K. Yonge High School in Gainesville, where he was standout high school football player for the P. K. Yonge Blue Wave.

He played as a quarterback, running back, wingback and defensive back. He received All-state honors as a senior, rushing for 427 yards and making 27 receptions.

== College career ==
Jackson accepted a football scholarship to attend the University of Florida in Gainesville, where he played for coach Steve Spurrier's Florida Gators football team from 1990 to 1993. After being redshirted, he appeared in 5 games as a freshman but did not record a reception.

As a sophomore, he posted 51 receptions (second in the conference) for 725 yards and 10 touchdowns (led the conference and tied for the second most ever in school history). Against Auburn University he had career-highs of 12 receptions (tied for the second most ever in school history) and 157 yards. Against the University of Georgia, he became the fifth player in school history to make 3 touchdown receptions in one game. In the 1992 Sugar Bowl against the University of Notre Dame, he had the second best total yardage in Gators bowl history, with 8 receptions for 148 yards.

As a junior, he had one of the best receiving seasons in school history, posting 62 receptions (led the conference and were the third most ever in school history), 772 yards (led the conference and were the fifth most ever in school history) and 8 touchdowns, including a career-high 70-yard touchdown reception in the SEC Championship game against the University of Alabama.

As a senior, he started only 9 games and missed the game against the University of Tennessee with a sprained left knee. He finished second on the team with 49 receptions for 675 yards and 6 touchdowns.

Jackson led the team in receiving in 1991 and 1992, and was a first-team All-Southeastern Conference (SEC) selection in 1992, and an honorable mention All-American in 1991, 1992 and 1993. Memorably, he had 148 receiving yards against the Notre Dame Fighting Irish in the 1992 Sugar Bowl and 130 yards against the West Virginia Mountaineers in the 1994 Sugar Bowl.

Jackson finished his college career with 162 receptions (second in school history) for 2,172 yards (second in school history) and twenty-four touchdowns—still fifth on the Gators' all-time receiving yardage list. He also walked-on to the Florida Gators men's basketball team in the 1989–90 season, averaging 3 points per game and making 20 steals.

He graduated from Florida with a bachelor's degree in telecommunications in 1993, and was inducted into the University of Florida Athletic Hall of Fame as a "Gator Great" in 2008.

== Professional career ==
Jackson was selected by the Dallas Cowboys in the fourth round (109th pick overall) of the 1994 NFL draft. After being inactive during all of the 1994 season, he asked the team to leave him unprotected in the 1995 NFL expansion draft, so he could get an opportunity to play in another place and not be a reserve behind Michael Irvin.

In 1995, the NFL's two new expansion teams, the Carolina Panthers and the Jacksonville Jaguars, participated in the 1995 NFL expansion draft, an opportunity to pick available players from the rosters of the existing NFL teams. The Jaguars picked Jackson from the Cowboys' unprotected list as the twenty-first overall pick in the expansion draft. In their inaugural season, he led the team in receiving with 53 receptions for 589 yards and 5 touchdowns, while starting in 10 contests. In 1996, he posted 33 receptions (fifth on the team) for 486 yards (fourth on the team) and 3 receiving touchdowns (tied for second on the team). In 1997, his stats diminished, coinciding with the explosion in the production of wide receivers Jimmy Smith and Keenan McCardell. He was waived on August 30, 1998. He compiled 103 catches for 1,281 yards and ten touchdowns during his time with the club.

Jackson signed with the Cincinnati Bengals on September 10, 1998. He was declared inactive in 6 games. In 1999, he ranked third on the team with 31 receptions for 369 yards and 2 touchdowns.

On April 2, 2000, he signed as a free agent with the New Orleans Saints. He started the last 6 games of the season, he ranked third on the team with 37 receptions for 523 yards and 6 touchdowns. In 2001, he ranked second on the team with 81 catches for 1,046 yards and five touchdowns in sixteen starts.

On July 12, 2002, he signed with the Atlanta Falcons taking the place of the previously released Jeff Graham. He saw little playing time and was waived on October 28, 2002.

On October 31, 2002, he signed with the Washington Redskins, reuniting with his former college coach, Steve Spurrier, then head coach of the team. He appeared in 5 games with one start and was cut on December 12.

On March 12, 2004, he signed with the Denver Broncos and was released before the season started on August 17.

Jackson finished his eight-season NFL career with 284 receptions for 3,641 yards and twenty-four touchdowns.

== NFL career statistics ==
Legend
	Led the league
**Bold**	Career high

=== Regular season ===
Year	Team	Games		Receiving					
Year	Team	GP	GS	Tgt	Rec	Yds	Avg	Lng	TD
1995	JAX	14	10	91	53	589	11.1	45	5
1996	JAX	**16**	2	42	33	486	14.7	58	3
1997	JAX	**16**	1	35	17	206	12.1	45	2
1998	CIN	8	0	16	7	165	**23.6**	47	0
1999	CIN	**16**	2	64	31	369	11.9	29	2
2000	NO	15	7	80	37	523	14.1	53	**6**
2001	NO	**16**	**16**	**135**	**81**	**1,046**	12.9	**63**	5
2002	ATL	7	1	39	18	199	11.1	29	0
2002	WAS	5	1	14	7	58	8.3	19	1
Career		113	40	516	284	3,641	12.8	63	24

=== Postseason ===
Year	Team	Games		Receiving					
Year	Team	GP	GS	Tgt	Rec	Yds	Avg	Lng	TD
1996	JAX	**3**	0	8	4	46	11.5	19	0
1997	JAX	1	0	2	0	0	0.0	0	0
2000	NO	2	**2**	**23**	**15**	**267**	**17.8**	**50**	**4**
Career		6	2	33	19	313	16.5	50	4

== Coaching career ==
In November 2018, Jackson was hired by his former college head coach Steve Spurrier as the wide receivers coach for the Orlando Apollos of the Alliance of American Football. He remained with the team until the league folded.

On May 8, 2023, Jackson was hired by his high school alma mater, PK Yonge as head coach of the football team.

== Personal life ==
Jackson's younger brother, Terry Jackson, was a tailback for the Gators from 1995 to 1998, and played running back and special teams for the San Francisco 49ers from 1999 to 2005. His father, Willie Jackson Sr., led the Gators in all-purpose yards and kick-off returns in the early 1970s, and was one of the team's first two African-American players at the University of Florida. All three Jacksons wore jersey No. 22 for the Gators.

== See also ==
- Florida Gators football, 1990–99
- List of Dallas Cowboys players
- List of Florida Gators in the NFL draft
- List of New Orleans Saints players
- List of University of Florida alumni
- List of University of Florida Athletic Hall of Fame members
- List of Washington Redskins players
