= 1992 Sugar Bowl =

1992 USF&G Sugar Bowl
- 58th Sugar Bowl; The Cheerios Bowl
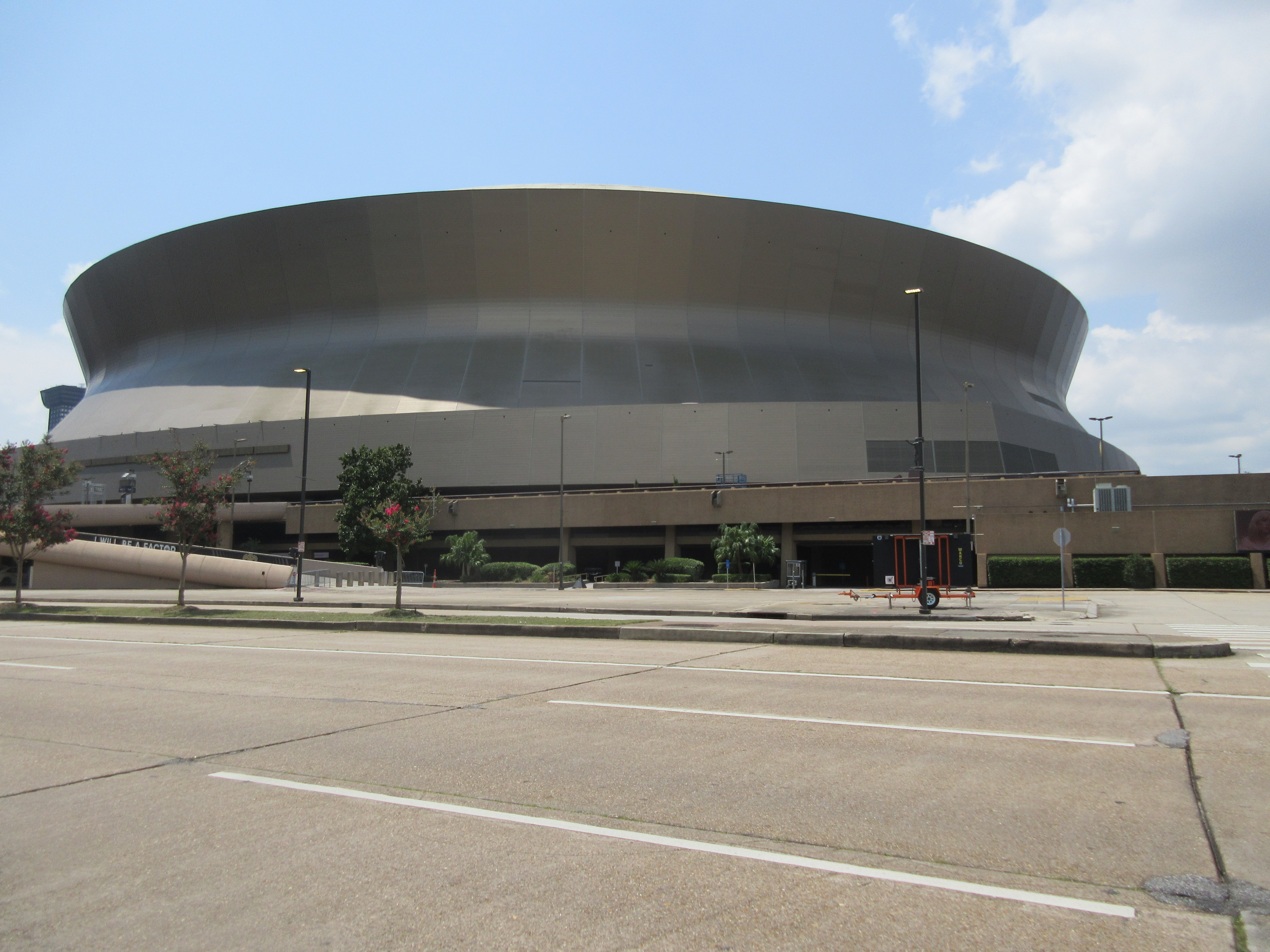
- The Louisiana Superdome in New Orleans, Louisiana, hosted the Sugar Bowl.
Notre Dame Fighting Irish	Florida Gators
(9–3)	(10–1)
Independent	SEC
39	28
Head coach: Lou Holtz	Head coach: Steve Spurrier
AP / Coaches; 18 / 18	AP / Coaches; 3 / 4
	1	2	3	4	Total
Notre Dame	0	7	10	22	39
Florida	10	6	0	12	28
- Date: January 1, 1992
- Season: 1991
- Stadium: Louisiana Superdome
- Location: New Orleans, Louisiana
- MVP: Jerome Bettis (Notre Dame RB)
- Favorite: Florida by 6.5 points (52.5)
- Referee: James Sprenger (Pac-10)

United States TV coverage
- Network: ABC
- Announcers: Al Michaels, Frank Gifford, Dan Dierdorf, and Tim Brant

The 1992 Sugar Bowl was the 58th edition of the college football bowl game, played at the Louisiana Superdome in New Orleans, Louisiana, on Wednesday, January 1. Part of the 1991–92 bowl game season, it matched the eighteenth-ranked Notre Dame Fighting Irish and the #3 Florida Gators of the Southeastern Conference (SEC).

Notre Dame rallied late in the fourth quarter to upset the favored Gators, 39–28.

The game is also known as "The Cheerios Bowl," due to the comment a waiter supposedly told Irish head coach Lou Holtz at a restaurant that "the difference between Cheerios and Notre Dame is that Cheerios belong in a bowl."

== Game summary ==
The game kicked off shortly after 7:30 p.m. CST, following the Rose Bowl on ABC, and shortly after the start of the Orange Bowl on NBC, which matched top-ranked Miami and #11 Nebraska.

The Florida Gators built an early 7–0 lead when their Heisman Trophy candidate, quarterback Shane Matthews, found All-SEC wide receiver Willie Jackson on a 15-yard touchdown pass. Florida led 10–0 at the end of the first quarter, after Arden Czyzewski added a 26-yard field goal to cap the quarter.

Czyzewski added a 24-yard field goal, early in the second quarter, allowing the Gators to take a 13–0 lead. Notre Dame quarterback Rick Mirer capped a methodical drive with a perfect 40-yard touchdown pass to wideout Lake Dawson, making it 13–7 Gators. The Gators led 16–7 at half, after Czyzewski's third field goal of the game. In the third quarter, Notre Dame got a 23-yard field goal from Kevin Pendergast, and a 4-yard touchdown pass from Rick Mirer to Irv Smith to take a 17–16 lead into the 4th quarter.

In the fourth quarter, Czyzewski's 37-yard field goal made it 19–17, and his fifth field goal of the game gave the Gators a 22–17 lead with under twelve minutes remaining. Notre Dame's Jerome Bettis then took over the game, as he rushed for touchdowns of 3 and 49 yards, and the Irish led 32–22. Florida quickly responded with a 36-yard score from Matthews to Harrison Houston with 2:28 left to reduce the lead to four points at 32–28.

Notre Dame put the game out of reach following Bettis' third rushing touchdown of the quarter, a 39-yarder, to push the score to 39–28, which was the final. Bettis finished with 150 yards rushing and was the game's MVP, scoring his three touchdowns in less than three minutes. Florida quarterback Shane Matthews set Sugar Bowl records for passing yards (370), and completions (28). Florida lost despite outgaining Notre Dame 511–433, and committing only two turnovers to Notre Dame's four.

=== Scoring ===
First quarter

- Florida – Willie Jackson 15-yard pass from Shane Matthews (Arden Czyzewski kick)
- Florida – Czyzewski 26-yard field goal

Second quarter

- Florida – Czyzewski 24-yard field goal
- Notre Dame – Lake Dawson 40-yard pass from Rick Mirer (Craig Hentrich kick)
- Florida – Czyzewski 36-yard field goal

Third quarter

- Notre Dame – Kevin Pendergast 23-yard field goal
- Notre Dame – Irv Smith 4-yard pass from Mirer (Hentrich kick)

Fourth quarter

- Florida – Czyzewski 37-yard field goal
- Florida – Czyzewski 24-yard field goal
- Notre Dame – Jerome Bettis 3-yard run (Brooks pass from Mirer)
- Notre Dame – Bettis 49-yard run (Pendergast kick)
- Florida – Harrison Houston 36-yard pass from Matthews (pass failed)
- Notre Dame – Bettis 39-yard run (Pendergast kick)

== Statistics ==
Statistics	Notre Dame	Florida
First downs	23	29
Rushes–yards	49–279	33–141
Passing yards	154	370
Passes (C–A–I)	14–19–1	28–58–2
Total offense	68–433	91–511
Return yards	31	4
Punts–average	2–34.0	2–52.5
Fumbles–lost	4–3	0–0
Turnovers	4	2
Penalties–yards	3–15	4–40
Time of possession	29:00	31:00

== Aftermath ==
Notre Dame climbed five spots to thirteenth in the final AP poll and Florida fell to seventh.
