= P. K. Yonge Developmental Research School =

Public primary and secondary school in Gainesville, Florida, United States

Coordinates: 29°38′26″N 82°20′7″W

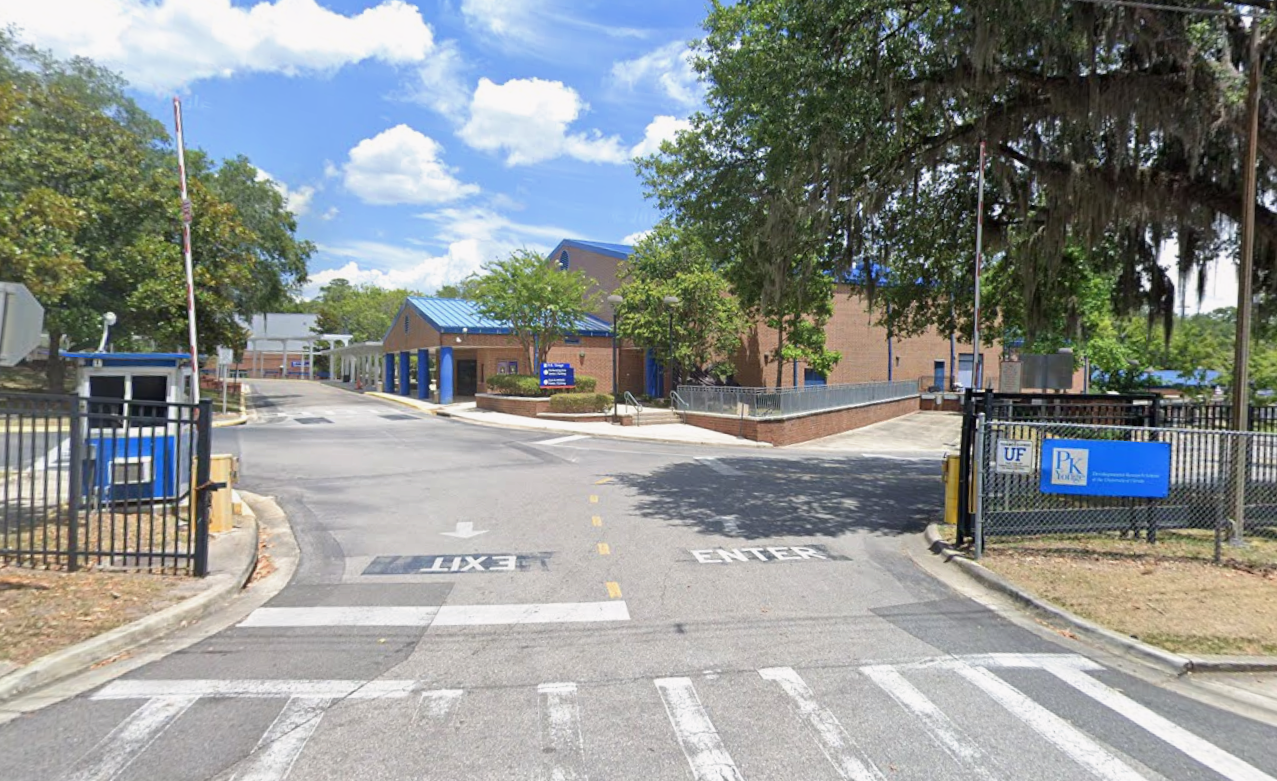
- Former name: P.K. Yonge Laboratory School
- Type: School
- Established: 1934
- Director: Carrie Geiger
- Students: 1,500
- Location: Gainesville, Florida, Florida, U.S.
- Campus: 34 acres (14 ha)
- Colors: Blue and orange
- Mascot: The Blue Wave
- Website: Official website
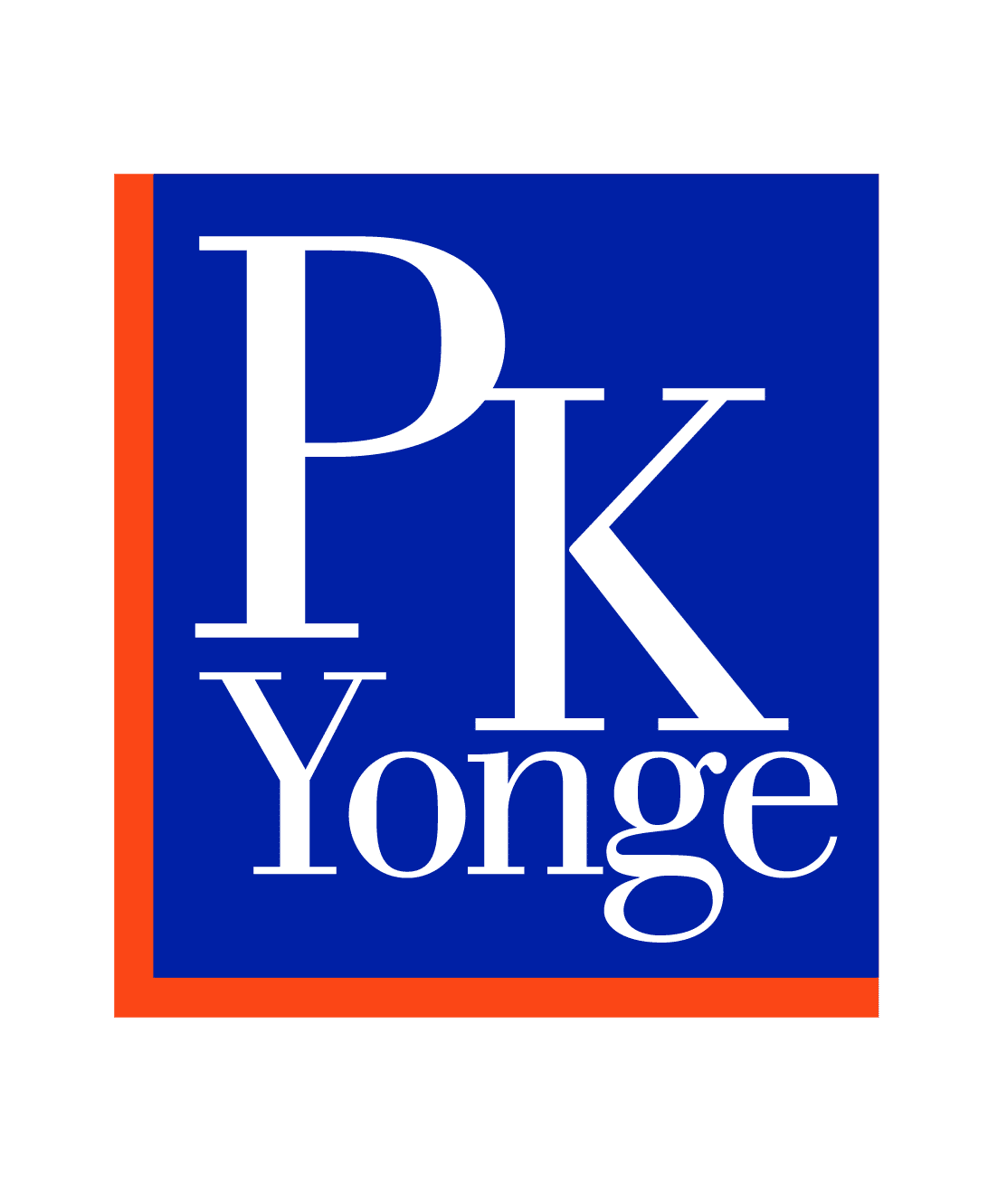

P. K. Yonge Developmental Research School is a PreK-12 public laboratory school of the University of Florida, in Gainesville, Florida, United States. The student population, selected by lottery, mirrors the demographics of the school-age population of the State of Florida.

== Organization ==
Established in 1934 in Norman Hall on the University of Florida campus, P.K. Yonge is a one-school school district and also a department of the University of Florida College of Education. A laboratory school (reflected in the school's former name, the P.K. Yonge Laboratory School), the school's mission is to design, test, and disseminate innovations in K-12 education by serving a diverse student community. The school interim director is Dr. Carrie Geiger, the secondary school principal is Dr. Pennypacker Hill, Ed.D., and the elementary school principal is Dicy Watson. Faculty, in addition to teaching duties, are required to engage in formal research projects each year, which are presented at an annual Inquiry Symposium attended by all P.K. Yonge faculty and colleagues from the University of Florida College of Education.

P.K. Yonge is named in honor of Philip Keyes Yonge (1850–1934), who served 29 years on the Florida Board of Control (the former governing body for all Florida public universities), including 22 years as chairman of the board.

At the beginning of the 2021–22 school year, P.K. Yonge opened a state-of-the-art Middle and High School school building, and continues to work towards total campus revitalization, now focusing on a new gym with a scheduled opening for early 2027.

== Athletics ==
Teams at the school compete under the name "Blue Wave." Kelly Barrett has been the athletic director since 2025. The boys' basketball program won the state championship in 1991. The girls have won state championships four times: 1981, 1983, 2010, and 2012. The school has also won state titles in boys' cross country (1980), boys' track and field (1965, 2005, 2006, 2007), girls' track and field (2005), and girls' volleyball (2000, 2002, 2014, 2015).

== Performing Arts ==
P.K. Yonge's performing arts programs include a theatre department that hosts award-winning Thespian Troupe No. 4102 which competes yearly at Florida Thespian District 12 conferences and Florida State Thespian conferences. They have been known for presenting fall plays, spring musicals, and various public and student-created performance events. Students often audition for choirs.

== The Blue Wave Marching Band and Color Guard ==
The marching band at P.K. Yonge has competed in Florida Marching Band Championships (FMBCs) since it was established in 1997 as the Florida Marching Band Coalition. It is currently directed by Robert Marski since the 2018–19 school year. At FMBC 2018, the marching band received sixth place, with percussion winning their caption. At FMBC 2021, The PKY Band made the finals for the first time in school history, and placed third overall in class 1A states. In 2022, they repeated the same success, finishing third in class 2A. In 2024, they competed in the FFCC Outdoor Championships and won 1st place in class 1A. The Color Guard marches as a part of the Blue Wave Marching Band, and also competes in the winter season as the P.K. Yonge Winterguard.

== Branding ==
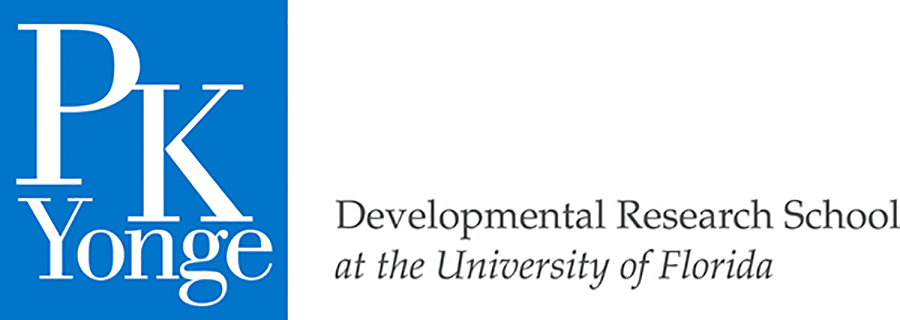
Old Academic/Administrative Logo

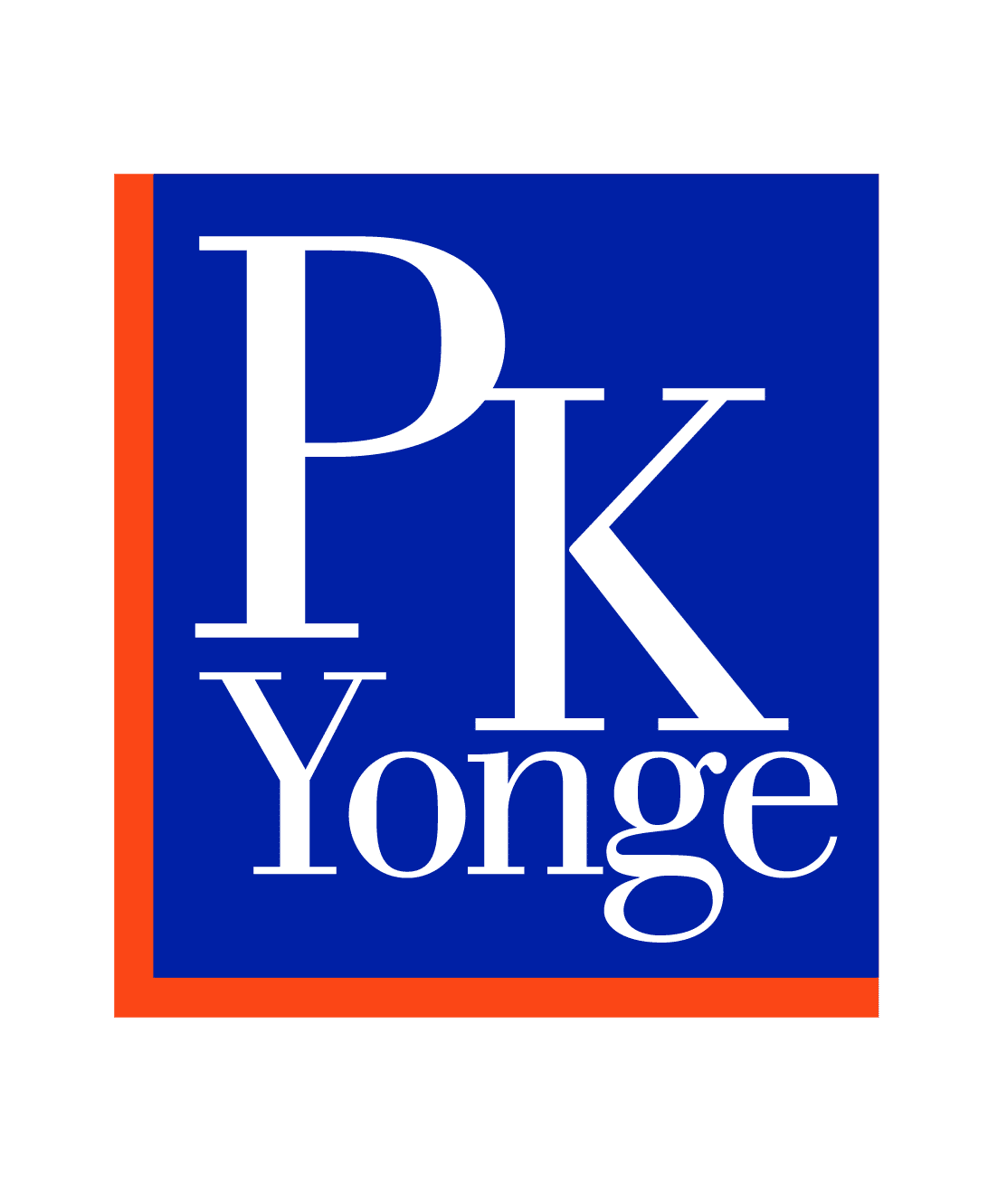
New Academic/Administrative Logo

P.K. Yonge developed a new official brand during the 2014–15 school year. There are two logos, an administrative/academic logo and an athletics logo which depicts the school's Blue Wave.

In the 2024-2025 school year, P.K. Yonge changed their official colors to blue and orange, to match the University of Florida. They also added an orange bar alongside their academic logo, to represent their affiliation to the University of Florida.

== Notable alumni ==
- Robert Baker – Auburn Tigers wide receiver
- Doug Dickey – College Football Hall of Fame coach
- Chris Doering – Florida Gators wide receiver
- Terry Jackson – Florida Gators running back
- Willie Jackson – Florida Gators wide receiver
- T. L. Latson (class of 1992) – professional basketball player
- Randall Leath Florida Gators Basketball Player
- Stan Lynch (class of 1973) - professional drummer, best known for work with Tom Petty and the Heartbreakers
- Travis McGriff – Florida Gators wide receiver
- Sally Menke (class of 1972) – Oscar-nominated film editor
- Rodney Mullen (class of 1984) – professional skateboarder
- Bernie Parrish – NFL Championship cornerback (1964)
- Derrick Robinson (class of 2006) - Cincinnati Reds outfielder
- Fred Rothwell – NFL player
- Kayla Simmons – current model and former volleyball player
- Peter Small – groundbreaking researcher on tuberculosis and AIDS
- Ralph Turlington - Speaker of the Florida House (1966–1968) and Florida Commissioner of Education (1974–1986)
- Jordan Williams – NFL player
- Jack May (class of 1954) - Winner of 1975 Cannonball Baker Sea-to-Shining-Sea Memorial Trophy Dash

== See also ==
- Buildings at the University of Florida
