= Terry Jackson (running back) =

American football player (born 1976)

No. 22
- Position: Fullback

Personal information
- Born: January 10, 1976 (age 50); Gainesville, Florida, U.S.
- Listed height: 6 ft 0 in (1.83 m)
- Listed weight: 232 lb (105 kg)

Career information
- High school: P. K. Yonge (Gainesville)
- College: Florida
- NFL draft: 1999: 5th round, 157th overall pick

Career history
- San Francisco 49ers (1999–2005)

Awards and highlights
- Bowl Alliance national champion (1996)

Career NFL statistics
- Games played: 100
- Rushing attempts: 70
- Rushing yards: 331
- Receptions: 51
- Receiving yards: 351
- Touchdowns: 5
- Stats at Pro Football Reference

Terrance Bernard Jackson (born January 10, 1976) is an American former professional football player who was a fullback, running back and special teams player for seven seasons with the San Francisco 49ers of the National Football League (NFL) during the 1990s and 2000s. Jackson played college football for the Florida Gators, and was a member of a national championship team. Thereafter, he played in the NFL for the 49ers. Jackson is now a college football administrator at his alma mater.

== Early life ==
Jackson was born in Gainesville, Florida in 1976. His father was Willie Jackson Sr., a former Gators wide receiver who was one of the first two African-American athletes to play for the University of Florida's Gators teams from 1970 to 1973. Jackson attended P. K. Yonge High School in Gainesville, where he was standout athlete for the P.K. Yonge Blue Wave high school football and basketball teams. In football, he played a variety of positions including fullback, strong safety, linebacker and tailback. Jackson's older brother, Willie Jackson Jr., was an All-American wide receiver for the Florida Gators and played in the NFL.

== College career ==
Jackson accepted an athletic scholarship to attend the University of Florida in Gainesville, where he played for coach Steve Spurrier's Gators football teams from 1995 to 1998. Despite his versatility and demonstrated athleticism in high school, he was not highly rated by the recruiting services and he received one of the last scholarships offered by the Gators. Jackson, like his older brother, Willie Jackson Jr., and his father, Willie Jackson Sr., before him, wore football jersey number "22" for the Gators. The Gators coaching staff redshirted him when he was a true freshman in 1994, and he converted from strong safety to tailback to help meet the needs of the team in 1995, and memorably ran for 138 yards and three touchdowns against the Kentucky Wildcats. During Jackson's four seasons as a letterman, the Gators won Southeastern Conference (SEC) championships in 1995 and 1996, and the Bowl Alliance national championship in 1996. As a senior in 1998, Jackson was a team captain and a second-team Academic All-American.

Jackson was also as an SEC Academic Honor Roll honoree all four years, and was the recipient of an NCAA post-graduate scholarship. He graduated from the University of Florida with a bachelor's degree in business administration in 1998.

== Professional career ==
The San Francisco 49ers selected Jackson in the fifth round (157th pick overall) of the 1999 NFL draft. He played for the 49ers his entire seven-year NFL career from 1999 to 2005. Jackson was a solid interior runner, and had surprising quickness and power when he broke through the line. He was primarily used as a blocker and receiver out of the backfield on third down situations. Jackson was also a good special teams player and was a team captain of the special teams squad for several years. He had a limited role on offense in his final two NFL seasons.

== Personal ==
Jackson won the 2000 Madden Bowl.

In March 2008, the Florida Gators' head football coach Urban Meyer announced that Jackson had been hired to serve as the Director of Player and Community Relations for the Gators football staff.

== See also ==
- Florida Gators football, 1990–99
- History of the San Francisco 49ers
- List of Florida Gators in the NFL draft
- List of University of Florida alumni
