= Steve Spurrier =

American football player and coach (born 1945)

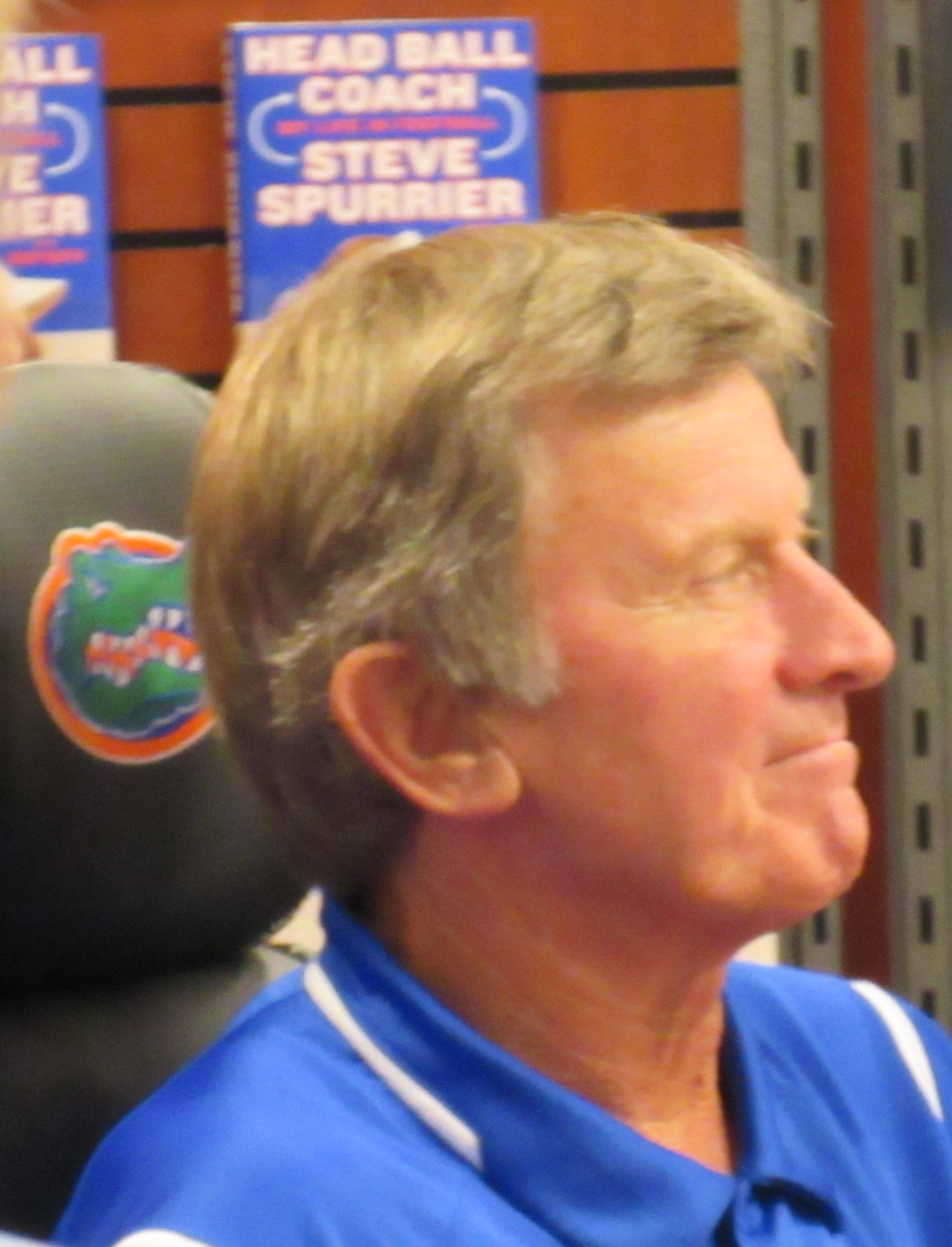
- Spurrier in 2016

No. 11
- Positions: Quarterback, punter

Personal information
- Born: April 20, 1945 (age 81); Miami Beach, Florida, U.S.
- Listed height: 6 ft 2 in (1.88 m)
- Listed weight: 204 lb (93 kg)

Career information
- High school: Science Hill (Johnson City, Tennessee)
- College: Florida (1964–1966)
- NFL draft: 1967: 1st round, 3rd overall pick

Career history

Playing
- San Francisco 49ers (1967–1975); Tampa Bay Buccaneers (1976)

Coaching
- Florida (1978) Quarterbacks & wide receivers coach; Georgia Tech (1979) Quarterbacks coach; Duke (1980–1982) Offensive coordinator & quarterbacks coach; Tampa Bay Bandits (1983–1985) Head coach; Duke (1987–1989) Head coach; Florida (1990–2001) Head coach; Washington Redskins (2002–2003) Head coach; South Carolina (2005–2015) Head coach; Orlando Apollos (2019) Head coach

Awards and highlights
- As a player: Heisman Trophy (1966); Unanimous All-American (1966); First-team All-American (1965); Florida Football Ring of Honor (2006); National High School Hall of Fame; As a coach: National champion (1996); 6× SEC (1991, 1993–1996, 2000); ACC champion (1989); 8× SEC Eastern Division champion (1992–1996, 1999–2000, 2010); AAF champion (2019); 7× SEC Coach of the Year (1990–1991, 1994–1996, 2005, 2010); 2× ACC Coach of the Year (1988–1989); FWAA First-Year Coach of the Year (2005)

Career NFL statistics
- Passing attempts: 1,151
- Passing completions: 597
- Completion percentage: 51.9%
- TD–INT: 40–60
- Passing yards: 6,878
- Passer rating: 60.1
- Punts: 230
- Punting yards: 8,818
- Longest punt: 61
- Stats at Pro Football Reference

Head coaching record
- Postseason: Bowl: 11–10 (.524)
- Career: College: 228–89–2 (.718); NFL: 12–20 (.375); USFL: 35–21 (.625); AAF: 7–1 (.875)
- Coaching profile at Pro Football Reference
- College Football Hall of Fame

Stephen Orr Spurrier (born April 20, 1945) is an American retired football coach and player, who is also commonly referred to by his nicknames, the Head Ball Coach or the ol' Ball Coach. Spurrier was a college football quarterback with the Florida Gators, where he won the 1966 Heisman Trophy. The San Francisco 49ers selected him in the first round of the 1967 NFL draft, and he spent a decade playing in the National Football League (NFL) mainly as a backup quarterback and punter. He was inducted into the College Football Hall of Fame as a player in 1986.

Spurrier went into coaching in 1978 and spent five years as a college assistant for the Florida Gators, the Georgia Tech Yellow Jackets, and the Duke Blue Devils where he began to develop his innovative offensive system while serving as the Blue Devils offensive coordinator in the early 1980s. He was hired to his first head coaching job by the Tampa Bay Bandits of the United States Football League (USFL) in 1983 and led the team to two playoff appearances in three seasons before the league folded. Spurrier returned to the college ranks in 1987, serving as the head football coach at Duke (three seasons), Florida (12 seasons), and South Carolina (10.5 seasons), amassing 228 total wins and a 72% career winning percentage. Between his stints at Florida and South Carolina, he led the Washington Redskins of the NFL for two seasons with less success. Spurrier retired from coaching in 2015 and became an ambassador and consultant for the University of Florida's athletic department, though he briefly returned to the sidelines to coach the Orlando Apollos of the short-lived Alliance of American Football in 2019.

Spurrier's teams were known for winning with aggressive and high-scoring offenses, and he became known for teasing and "needling" rivals both before and after beating them on the field. Spurrier's 1989 Duke squad won the program's only Atlantic Coast Conference (ACC) championship between 1963 and 2025. He is the winningest coach in both Florida and South Carolina program history, making him the only coach to hold the record for most wins at two different Southeastern Conference (SEC) schools, and Florida's streak of four consecutive SEC championships in the mid-1990s is the second-longest in conference history. When Florida quarterback Danny Wuerffel won the Heisman Trophy during the Gators' 1996 national championship season, Spurrier became the only Heisman Trophy winner to coach another Heisman Trophy winner. In 2017, he was inducted into the College Football Hall of Fame as a coach, making him one of four members to be honored for both his playing and coaching careers.

In recognition to his contributions to the university and its football program, the University of Florida officially renamed the Gators home field "Steve Spurrier-Florida Field at Ben Hill Griffin Stadium" in 2016.

== Early life ==
Spurrier was born on April 20, 1945, in Miami Beach, Florida. He is the second son of a Presbyterian minister, J. Graham Spurrier, and his wife Marjorie. Graham Spurrier changed congregations repeatedly during Steve's early childhood, resulting in several moves for the family. The Spurriers left Miami Beach before Steve's first birthday, moving to Charlotte, North Carolina to live near his paternal grandparents. His father accepted pastorships in Athens, Tennessee and then Newport, Tennessee before settling in Johnson City, Tennessee in 1957, when Steve Spurrier was 12 years old. The youngest Spurrier began to earn his reputation as a good athlete and a fierce competitor in Johnson City, impressing his peers and his older brother's friends with his tenacity in sandlot sports.

Steve Spurrier's athletic skills resulted in his father being asked to manage a Little League baseball team by the squad's sponsor so that his son would join and improve their record. Steve Spurrier has often repeated an anecdote about playing baseball under his father. "How many of you believe that it's not whether you win or lose, but how you play the game, that counts?" the elder Spurrier asked his players during an early season practice. When some raised their hands, he told them, "Well, I don't believe in that saying. If they're keeping score, we're going to play to win."

== Playing career ==
=== Science Hill High School ===
Spurrier attended Science Hill High School in Johnson City, Tennessee, where he played football, basketball and baseball for the Science Hill Hilltoppers and was an all-state selection in all three sports. Spurrier had an undefeated record in three years as a high school starting pitcher and led his team to two consecutive state baseball championships. On the basketball court, Spurrier played point guard and was known for his ability to run his team's offense with flashy passes and dribbling and his knack for scoring in many different ways, attributes which helped his team win two conference championships. He averaged 22 points per game during his senior season and was named the conference player of the year.

Many observers in Johnson City thought that Spurrier's best sport in high school was basketball, while his father thought that he was best at baseball. Spurrier agreed that basketball and baseball came more naturally, but he preferred football, and he became the Hilltopper's starting quarterback during his junior year. Coach Kermit Tipton installed a passing offense to take advantage of Spurrier's talents and, unusual for a high school team, occasionally allowed the young quarterback to call plays on the field. Boosted by a post-season game at the end of his senior year in which he brought his team back from a 21–0 second-half deficit to win 28–21, Spurrier was a high school All-American and drew the attention of many college programs.

Spurrier's achievements in multiple sports earned him induction into the National Federation of State High School Associations's National High School Hall of Fame.

=== University of Florida ===
==== Recruitment ====
After winning multiple all-state honors in high school, Spurrier was recruited in one or more sports by many colleges, including Alabama, Georgia, Mississippi, North Carolina, Kentucky, Duke, South Carolina, and both Air Force and Army. However, he was not aggressively pursued as a football player by the coaching staff at the University of Tennessee in nearby Knoxville because at the time, Tennessee ran a wing-T offense that featured a running quarterback while Spurrier was an excellent passer. While Tennessee never officially offered him a football scholarship, Volunteers basketball coach Ray Mears offered Spurrier a scholarship, which he declined since he preferred to play football.

University of Florida coach Ray Graves heard about Spurrier late in the recruiting process from his brother Edwin, who was the postmaster in Knoxville, and visited Johnson City in February 1963. Spurrier and his family got along well with Graves, and Steve visited the Florida campus in Gainesville the following week. He received a favorable first impression of Gainesville when he arrived to find warm sunshine after leaving freezing temperatures in Tennessee, and thought more highly of Graves when the coach stayed by his side in the school infirmary after Spurrier's cold worsened into the flu during his recruiting visit. Graves did not promise Spurrier that he would be his starting quarterback, but he told the star recruit that he fit into his coaching staff's plan to open up the Gator offense and would be given a fair opportunity to earn the job. Soon after returning home, Spurrier decided to attend the University of Florida because of "the passing, the SEC, the weather, and coach Ray Graves."

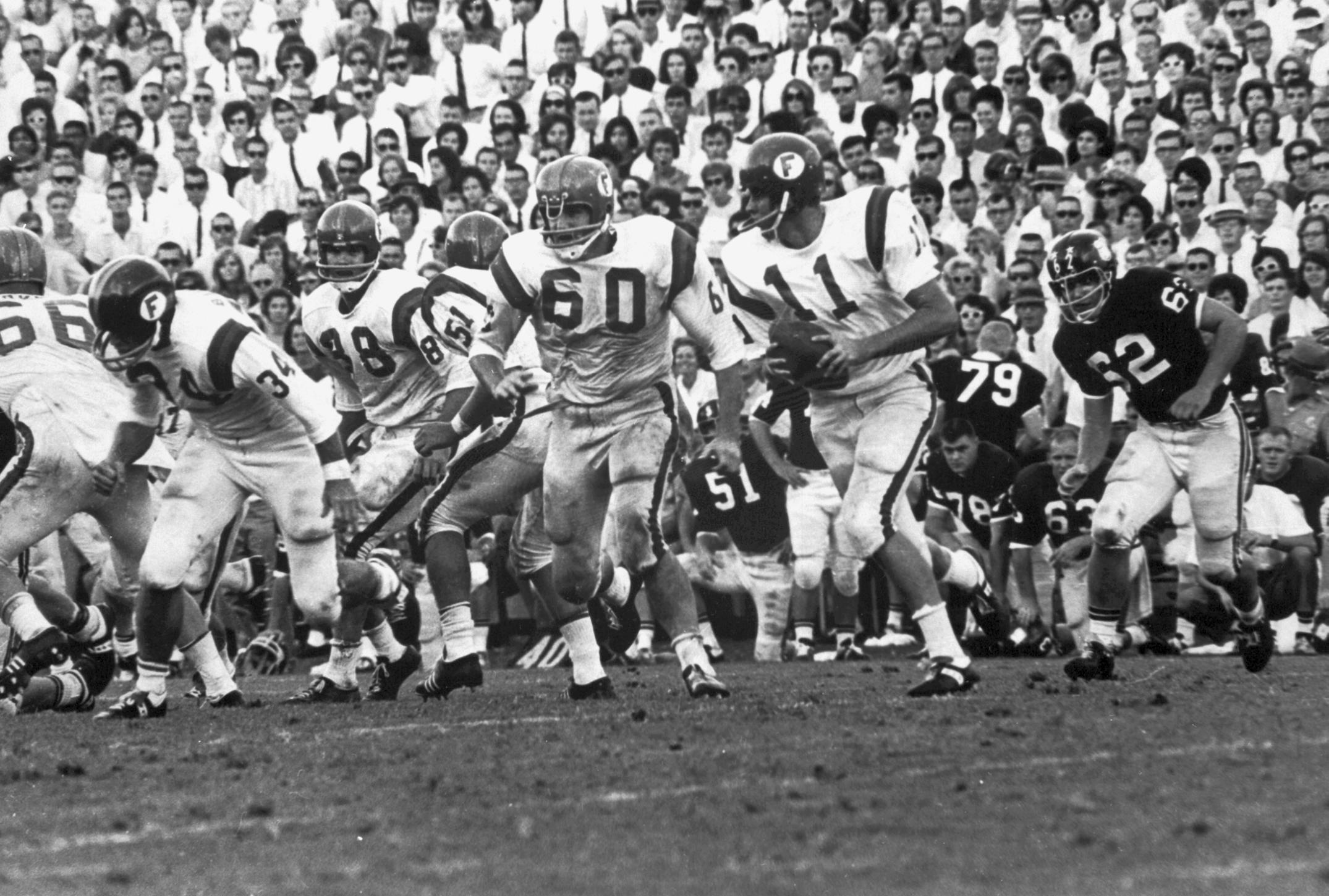
Spurrier (11) in 1964

==== 1963–64 ====
NCAA rules in the 1960s forbade college freshmen from participating in varsity sports competition. Spurrier therefore spent his first year at Florida practicing with the varsity team and playing on the freshman team, which scheduled four scrimmages against other schools' freshman squads as a way for young players to gain experience. In 1963, Spurrier led the "Baby Gators" to a 45–12 victory over Georgia's freshman team at Florida Field, a game which he half-jokingly claims as a home win against the Gators' fiercest rivals.

Spurrier was in competition for the starting quarterback position leading up to his sophomore year of 1964 until a serious knee injury suffered during spring drills allowed returning senior starter Tommy Shannon to keep the job. Coach Ray Graves still felt the need to get the future star on the field, so he decided to alternate Shannon and Spurrier as the flow of the game dictated. Spurrier entered the season-opening game against SMU in the second quarter. After two unsuccessful running plays called from the sidelines put the Gators in a third down and long situation, Coach Graves told Spurrier to call the next play himself. The young quarterback responded by completing a fifty-six yard screen pass on his first collegiate attempt and another pass for a touchdown on his second pass. Spurrier would add another touchdown pass during the second half of his varsity debut. The following week on the road at Mississippi State, Spurrier entered a tied game late in the fourth quarter and led the Gators down the field for a game-winning field goal.

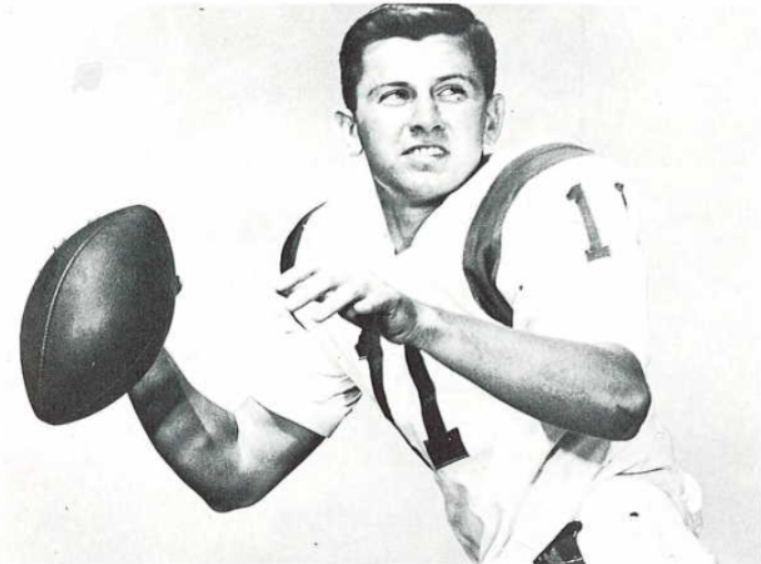
Spurrier in 1965

Spurrier continued to alternate with starter Tommy Shannon as the season progressed, gaining more playing time every week. After being named SEC Back of the Week for a two touchdown performance in a 30–14 upset over Ole Miss in October, Spurrier was given the starting nod for the undefeated Gators' next game against undefeated and #3 ranked and eventual national champion Alabama in Tuscaloosa. Though Spurrier threw a touchdown pass and was the Gators' offensive star, his team fell short when another late fourth quarter comeback attempt ended in a missed field goal and a 17–14 Alabama win. Spurrier remained the Gators' starter for the remainder of the season and was sometimes brilliant but inconsistent. He led the Gators to a 14–0 home win over rival Auburn and a 20–6 upset of #7 LSU in Baton Rouge, but he did not play well in losses to rivals Georgia and Florida State. Nevertheless, he was named the SEC's Sophomore of the Year for 1964.

==== 1965–66 ====
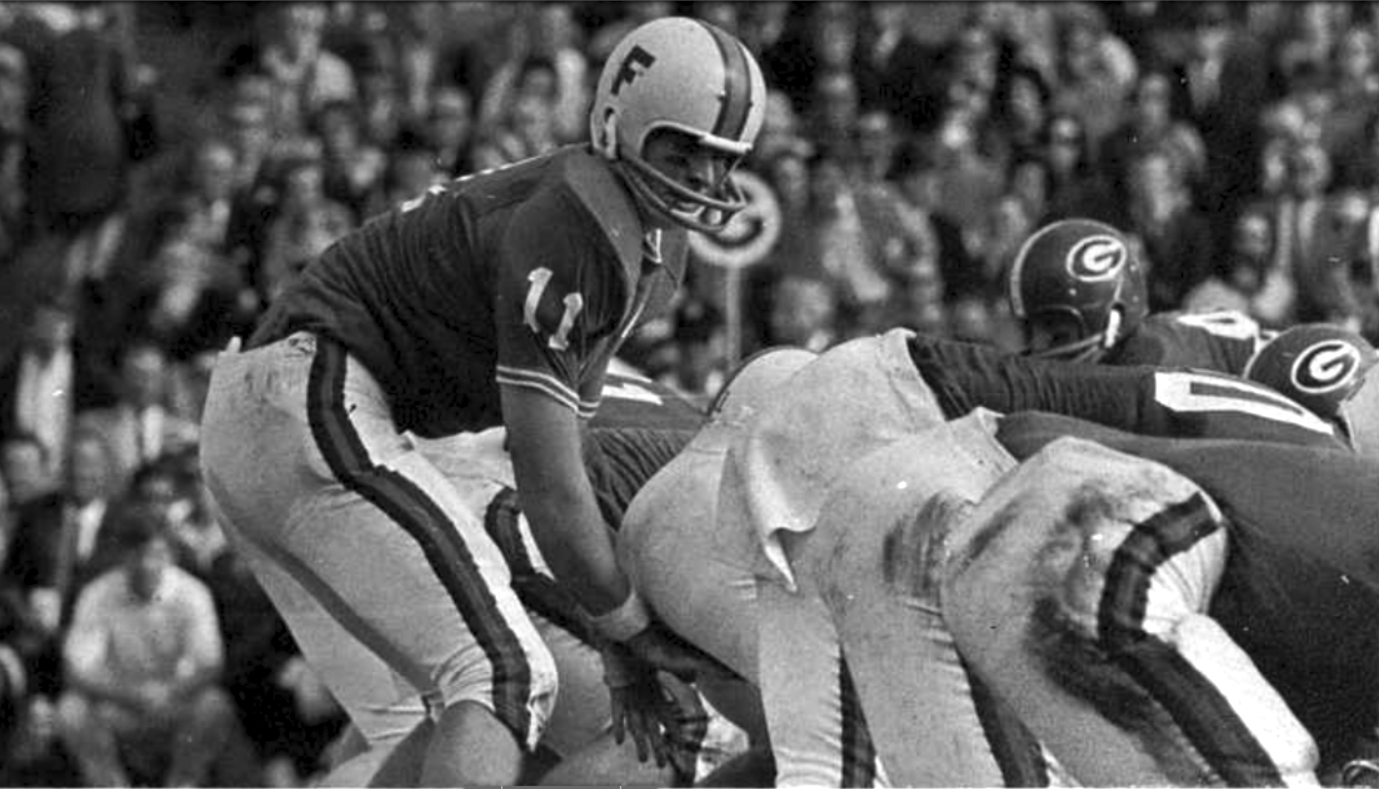
Spurrier and the Gators v. Georgia, 1966

Spurrier was the Gators' starting quarterback and team leader in 1965 and 1966. He finished ninth in Heisman Trophy voting for the 1965 season. He finished his three-year, thirty-one-game college career having completed 392 of 692 attempts for 4,848 passing yards and 37 touchdowns, breaking every UF and many conference records for passing and total offense. In addition to being a stellar passer, Spurrier gained notoriety by playing his best under pressure; eight times during his college career, he led the Gators to fourth-quarter comeback wins. The most memorable example was a November 1966 game against Auburn, when, after leading the team down the field on a two minute drill, he waved off Florida's regular placekicker and booted a forty-yard field goal, giving the Gators a 30–27 win and likely securing himself the Heisman Trophy. This penchant for dramatic comebacks prompted John Logue of the Atlanta Constitution to famously write "Blindfolded, with his back to the wall, with his hands tied behind him, Steve Spurrier would be a two-point favorite at his own execution."

As a junior, Spurrier was named a Football Writers Association of America first-team All-American and is still the only player from the losing team to be named the MVP of the Sugar Bowl after passing for a record 352 yards in leading a furious fourth-quarter rally that fell just short. (Note: Spurrier set the Sugar Bowl passing record with 352 yards in 1966 Sugar Bowl. This record would not be broken until the 1992 Sugar Bowl, when Florida quarterback Shane Matthews passed for 370 yards, and was broken again in the 1995 Sugar Bowl, when Florida quarterback Danny Wuerffel passed for 394 yards, both under head coach Steve Spurrier. Coincidentally, both of Spurrier's proteges also lost their record-breaking Sugar Bowl contests. The current Sugar Bowl passing record is currently held by another Florida quarterback, Tim Tebow, who threw for 482 yards in the 2010 Sugar Bowl, which Florida won. However, Tebow played for the Gators after Spurrier had left.) As a senior, Spurrier was awarded many national recognitions, including the 1966 Heisman Trophy and Walter Camp Memorial Trophy, and was a unanimous first-team All-American. He was also the 1966 recipient of Florida's Fergie Ferguson Award, which recognizes the "senior football player who displays outstanding leadership, character and courage."

Though the 9–2 1966 season was one of the best in program football history up to that point (along with the 1928 Florida Gators football team), the Gators fell short of their elusive first conference title due to a 27–10 upset loss to arch-rival Georgia, a loss that Spurrier would remember when he returned as Florida's coach and made beating Georgia a priority.

In 2006, Spurrier was recognized by The Gainesville Sun as the No. 2 player of the first century of the Gators football program.

Spurrier was among the test subjects who was given a prototype for what would become Gatorade during the 1965 season. Spurrier was unsure of whether or not the beverage had a substantial impact on the team's success.

=== National Football League ===
==== San Francisco 49ers ====
The San Francisco 49ers selected Spurrier with the third overall pick of the 1967 NFL/AFL draft, trading up to land the star quarterback. Spurrier was told by team officials that he was being prepped to replace veteran 49ers quarterback and frequent All-Pro John Brodie in "four or five years", a situation which negatively affected his motivation. "I was not a very ambitious player", Spurrier admitted in his 2016 autobiography.

Spurrier had few opportunities to play and fewer to start early in his pro career, and he did not play very well when he got on the field. He attempted less than five passes over the entire season in three out of his first five years in the NFL, and he did not throw a touchdown pass until his third pro season. Instead, he settled into the role of backup quarterback and starting punter. Despite the limited action, Spurrier occasionally received credit for his contributions. He was nominated for Associated Press' Offensive Player of the Week in Week 6 of 1969, when he led the 49ers to an upset win over the Baltimore Colts. In the divisional round of the 1970–71 NFL playoffs against the Minnesota Vikings, he had a punt that was downed on the opposing one-yard line; Minnesota's offense was unable to advance from that far back and a poor punt set up the 49ers' game-sealing scoring drive.

Spurrier's first extended opportunity came in 1972, when an injured ankle left Brodie unable to play for over a month. San Francisco was 2–3 when Spurrier became the starter, and he led the team to a 6–1–1 record, throwing sixteen touchdowns over eight games and putting them in a position to make the playoffs. Spurrier continued to start even after Brodie had recovered. However, when he threw three interceptions in the first half of the regular-season finale, Brodie entered the game and led a second-half comeback that clinched a playoff spot. Head coach Dick Nolan chose to start Brodie in the first round of the playoffs against the Dallas Cowboys, whom the 49ers had beaten 31–10 on Thanksgiving Day in Texas with Spurrier starting. Spurrier did not make an appearance in the playoff rematch, and the Cowboys intercepted Brodie twice on their way to a 30–28 victory that ended the 49ers' season.

Spurrier next had an opportunity to start in the fifth game of the 1973 season, when he replaced a slumping Brodie against the Minnesota Vikings. Teammates later claimed that Spurrier drew new plays in the huddle in the snow at old Metropolitan Stadium on his way to a team-record 31 completions and 320 passing yards, but he also tossed two interceptions, and the 49ers lost 17–14. Spurrier's lingering knee injury flared up after the game, so 49ers Coach Nolan decided to start third-stringer Joe Reed the following week, and Spurrier played sparingly the remainder of the season.

Spurrier had successful knee surgery in the offseason and, with his NFL contract expired, listened to offers from teams in the new World Football League. However, Brodie had retired, and as the heir apparent to the 49ers' starting quarterback position in 1974, Spurrier decided to re-sign with San Francisco. Spurrier played well in the preseason and had seemingly secured the starting job, but these plans were derailed when he suffered a badly dislocated shoulder in the final preseason game. The injury required surgery, and he missed virtually the entire season. A serious offseason traffic accident reaggravated the injury, and Spurrier was again the 49ers backup quarterback to start the 1975 season, this time to veteran Norm Snead.

The 49ers began the 1975 season with a 2–5 record, prompting Spurrier to ask Nolan for a chance to start against the Los Angeles Rams, who had dominated the rivalry during his tenure in San Francisco. Nolan agreed, and Spurrier led his team to a 24–23 comeback win, throwing for 240 yards and three touchdowns with no interceptions in what he later called his "best, or at least favorite" game of his pro career. The performance earned him the starting job, and the 49ers won the next two games behind Spurrier to get back to 5–5. However, they lost their next four games, Spurrier was sent back to the bench, and Coach Nolan was fired at the conclusion of the season. Incoming coach Monte Clark traded multiple high draft picks for New England Patriots' quarterback Jim Plunkett, making it clear that Spurrier would not be a part of the 49ers' rebuilding plans. Overall, he was 13–12–1 as a starter with San Francisco.

==== Tampa Bay Buccaneers ====
In April 1976, Spurrier was sent to the expansion Tampa Bay Buccaneers in exchange for two players and a second-round draft pick as part of the new franchise's first trade. The Buccaneers' new acquisition generated local excitement, as Spurrier had been a college star at the nearby University of Florida. He won the job as team's first starting quarterback, a title that he later regretted, as the undermanned Bucs went on to suffer the first winless season (0–14) in modern NFL history. Though he had looked forward to playing professional football in Florida, Spurrier was frustrated by the losses, the constant hits absorbed while playing behind a porous offensive line, and his philosophical differences with Bucs coach John McKay. McKay insisted on employing a run-heavy attack similar to the offense he had used to win championships with the USC Trojans, while Spurrier felt that the team did not have the right personnel to run the ball effectively and should employ a more pass-oriented offense. Another point of contention was Coach McKay's insistence that his son, John McKay, Jr., be the Bucs' primary wide receiver while Spurrier and other observers felt that he did not have the talent to fill that role.

The Bucs cut Spurrier in April 1977, a move that left him "puzzled and disappointed" since he had been working out with the team up to that point and had not been told that his release was imminent. He signed with the Denver Broncos in July and was released after playing in several preseason games, then briefly signed with the Miami Dolphins but was released in the last round of cuts before the beginning of the 1977 regular season, at which point he decided to end his playing career.

Over 10 NFL seasons, Spurrier played in 106 games (starting 38), completing 597 passes in 1,151 attempts, for a total of 6,878 yards, 40 touchdowns, and 60 interceptions. He also punted 230 times for a 38.3-yard average.

== Coaching career ==
=== Assistant coach ===
==== Florida (1978) ====
Spurrier spent fall 1977 out of football, living in Gainesville with his young family and considering possible career choices. While not officially connected with the University of Florida at the time, he was often on campus, running at the university's track and attending football games as a fan. He watched the Gators play to a 6–4–1 record in 1977, a season that prompted head coach Doug Dickey to scrap the wishbone-based run-heavy attack that his teams had used for several years with declining success in favor of a more open pro-style offense. To effect this change, Dickey revamped his offensive staff, and he hired Spurrier to his first coaching job as Florida's quarterbacks and receivers coach.

The changes did not bring many positive results. While Florida's passing attack improved and former option quarterback Cris Collinsworth was named to the All-SEC team as a wide receiver under Spurrier's tutelage, the 1978 Gators' overall scoring output was almost identical to that of 1977 at about 22 points per game. The team's record also slumped to 4–7, leading to Dickey's dismissal. Spurrier expressed an interest in becoming Florida's next head coach but was not a serious candidate due to his lack of experience, and Clemson coach Charley Pell was hired soon after the conclusion of the season. Pell chose not to retain any of Dickey's coaching staff, leaving Spurrier without a job.

In later years, Spurrier has repeatedly thanked Doug Dickey for giving him a chance to get into coaching with no prior experience.

==== Georgia Tech (1979) ====
Spurrier was unsure if he wanted to continue pursuing a coaching career after his unpleasant experience at Florida, stating that he would only accept a position "if the opportunity was really right." In 1979, he accepted an offer to become the quarterbacks coach at Georgia Tech under head coach Pepper Rodgers, who had been an offensive assistant at Florida when Spurrier was the quarterback.

Like Dickey at Florida, Rodgers sought to shift Georgia Tech's offense from a wishbone attack to a more passing-oriented offense. And also like Dickey, Rodgers's efforts did not produce immediate results. The Yellow Jackets began the season 1–5–1 and did not score more than 14 points against a Division I-A opponent over its first seven games. Spurrier, who had not been tasked with constructing a game plan and had seldom been allowed to call plays up to that point, asked Coach Rodgers for a larger role on the staff and was allowed to take control of the offense for the eighth game of the season, against Duke. Georgia Tech surprised Duke with a more aggressive offense than they'd run all year, and the Yellow Jackets won, 24–14. With Spurrier continuing to call plays, Georgia Tech won the next two games as well, scoring over 20 points in both contests and setting a Georgia Tech record for passing yardage in a season. But the campaign ended with a 16–3 loss to archrival Georgia, dropping Georgia Tech to 4–6–1 overall and leading to Rodgers' dismissal.

Spurrier asked incoming head coach Bill Curry if he would be retained as Georgia Tech's quarterback coach and was told that he was one of "two or three" candidates for the job, prompting him to seek employment elsewhere. Spurrier would not forget being dismissed by Curry in 1980. In later years, Spurrier repeatedly mentioned his perfect record (6–0) against Curry's teams when they met as head coaches, often by very lopsided margins.

==== Duke (1980–1982) ====
In 1980, Spurrier was hired to be the offensive coordinator at Duke University by head coach Red Wilson, who had been impressed by Spurrier's coaching abilities the previous season when Georgia Tech had upset Wilson's Duke squad. Wilson gave the young coach free rein to design the offense, coach the quarterbacks, and call the plays, and Spurrier met the challenge by developing a record-breaking offense that Duke fans nicknamed "Air Ball". Under Spurrier, Blue Devils quarterback Ben Bennett set an NCAA record for career passing yardage, receiver Chris Castor was named ACC player of the year, and Duke's 1982 team became the first in Atlantic Coast Conference history to average more than 300 passing yards per game. Duke earned two straight winning seasons in 1981 and 1982, a feat that the program had not achieved since 1970 and 1971 and would not achieve again until Spurrier returned as the school's head football coach later in the decade. They also upset Tennessee in Knoxville 25–24 in 1982 on an 88-yard touchdown pass during Spurrier's first return to the state as an opponent.

In later years, Spurrier has stated that his seasons working to get maximum production out of outmanned Duke squads were critical to his development as a coach and an offensive strategist. Success at a school not known for its football program also built Spurrier's reputation as an innovative young offensive coach who could improvise and succeed without seeming to work very hard. Duke quarterback Ben Bennett recalls Spurrier diagraming a trick halfback option play with his cereal on the morning before a game, and the play going for a 60-yard touchdown pass that afternoon. During another game, Spurrier devised a new pass play on the sideline which Duke ran for a touchdown on its next offensive possession. Coach Wilson had not seen the play before, and when he asked Spurrier what play he'd called, the young assistant replied "Touchdown, coach."

=== Head coach ===
==== Tampa Bay Bandits (1983–1985) ====
In 1983, Spurrier returned to Tampa to accept his first head coaching position with the Tampa Bay Bandits of the new United States Football League (USFL). At 37 years old, Spurrier was the youngest head coach in professional football at the time.

"BanditBall" was marketed as a fun alternative to the woeful Tampa Bay Buccaneers, who were in the midst of a record-setting streak of losing seasons. Spurrier's wide-open offense was prominently featured, as was starting quarterback John Reaves, who had broken many of Spurrier's passing records at the University of Florida and had grown up in Tampa. The Bandits' attendance was the highest in the USFL over its three-year run, and Spurrier's offenses were consistently among the league's best. The team narrowly missed the playoffs in their first season and made the postseason the next two years. Overall, Spurrier led the Bandits to 35–21 record before the USFL dissolved after the 1985 season.

==== Duke (1987–1989) ====
Spurrier spent 1986 out of football as the USFL's planned move to a fall schedule never took place. When it became clear that the Bandits would not retake the field, Spurrier began to seek new coaching opportunities. He interviewed to be the head coach at Mississippi State, but was passed over in favor of Rockey Felker. He also sought to be the head coach at LSU, but was passed over in favor of Mike Archer.

Finally, Spurrier returned to Duke University as the Blue Devils' new head coach and offensive coordinator in 1987. Spurrier proceeded to raise the Blue Devils to levels of success that the program had not realized in over twenty-five years. His offenses broke numerous school and conference records for scoring, passing yards, and total yards, many of which had been set during his tenure as Duke's offensive coordinator. His 1989 Duke squad was the most successful, winning Duke's first Atlantic Coast Conference championship since 1962 (not repeated until 2025), and appearing in their first bowl game since 1960.

In what would become a recurring trend at most of his coaching stops, Spurrier's teams regularly beat their biggest rivals while he "needled" them with jokes and "zingers" that were often viewed as amusing to his fans but infuriating to opponents. Spurrier's Duke squads went 3–0 against archrival North Carolina, including a 41–0 victory in Chapel Hill that clinched a share of the 1989 ACC title. At Spurrier's suggestion, that win was followed by a team picture taken in front of the Kenan Memorial Stadium scoreboard, a photo that still rankles some Tar Heel supporters.

For his success, Spurrier was named the ACC Coach of the Year in both 1988 and 1989.

==== Florida (1990–2001) ====
In December 1989, Spurrier accepted an offer to return to the University of Florida as the Gators' "head ball coach." He had privately expressed interest in the job in early October, when Florida coach Galen Hall was fired mid-season for his alleged involvement in an NCAA rules violation and prominent Gator boosters reached out to Spurrier. However, he delayed any further discussion at that time to concentrate on coaching Duke. After the Blue Devils clinched the ACC championship in their last regular season game, Spurrier met with University of Florida president Robert Bryan and athletic director Bill Arnsparger, and he agreed in principle to return to Florida on December 12.

Spurrier asked to delay an official announcement until both Florida and Duke had played in their respective bowl games. As rumors swirled, however, Spurrier broke the news to his Duke team on December 27, the night before they played in the 1989 All-American Bowl. They played poorly and lost, and Spurrier later decided that he should have waited to tell his team until after the game, and that when it came to coaching jobs, "it's best to make your decision and move on quickly". Spurrier was officially announced as Florida's new football coach on December 31, 1989.

During his introductory press conference on New Year's Eve 1989, Spurrier said that he wanted to immediately change several things, including bringing back blue jerseys (Florida had switched from traditional blue to orange in 1979 under Charley Pell), bringing back natural grass to Florida Field (artificial turf had been installed in the early 1970s), and putting Miami back on the schedule (the schools' annual series had ended after the 1987 game). (Note: Florida's athletic administration brought back blue uniforms, installed natural grass, and signed a contract to renew the Miami rivalry before Spurrier's first Florida team took the field in 1990. However, the contract to play Miami was cancelled several months later when the SEC decided to move to an eight-game league schedule and establish the SEC Championship Game beginning in 1992.) He stressed the need to beat traditional rivals Auburn, Georgia, and Florida State, against whom Florida had gone 0–9 over the previous three seasons. Finally, he worked to convince Gator players and fans alike that it was possible to win championships at Florida, which had still never won an officially recognized conference title in 83 years of football. To that effect, he put together a booklet called "The Gator Mentality", in which is collected coaching tips and theories that he used himself along with inspirational quotes he shared with his players.

Spurrier inherited a team under NCAA investigation for the second time in five years. He successfully steered the program away from the previous scandals and led the Gators to the best record in the SEC in his first year, though they were declared ineligible for the league title due to NCAA probation handed down during the season. Building on the success of Spurrier's first year, Florida finally captured their first officially recognized SEC title in 1991. Under Spurrier, the Gators represented the SEC East in the first five SEC Championship Games, winning four of them. The 1996 team captured the Gators' first-ever National Championship with a 52–20 win over Florida State in the Sugar Bowl, avenging the Gators' sole regular-season loss in which Florida State upset Florida 24–21 in Tallahassee.

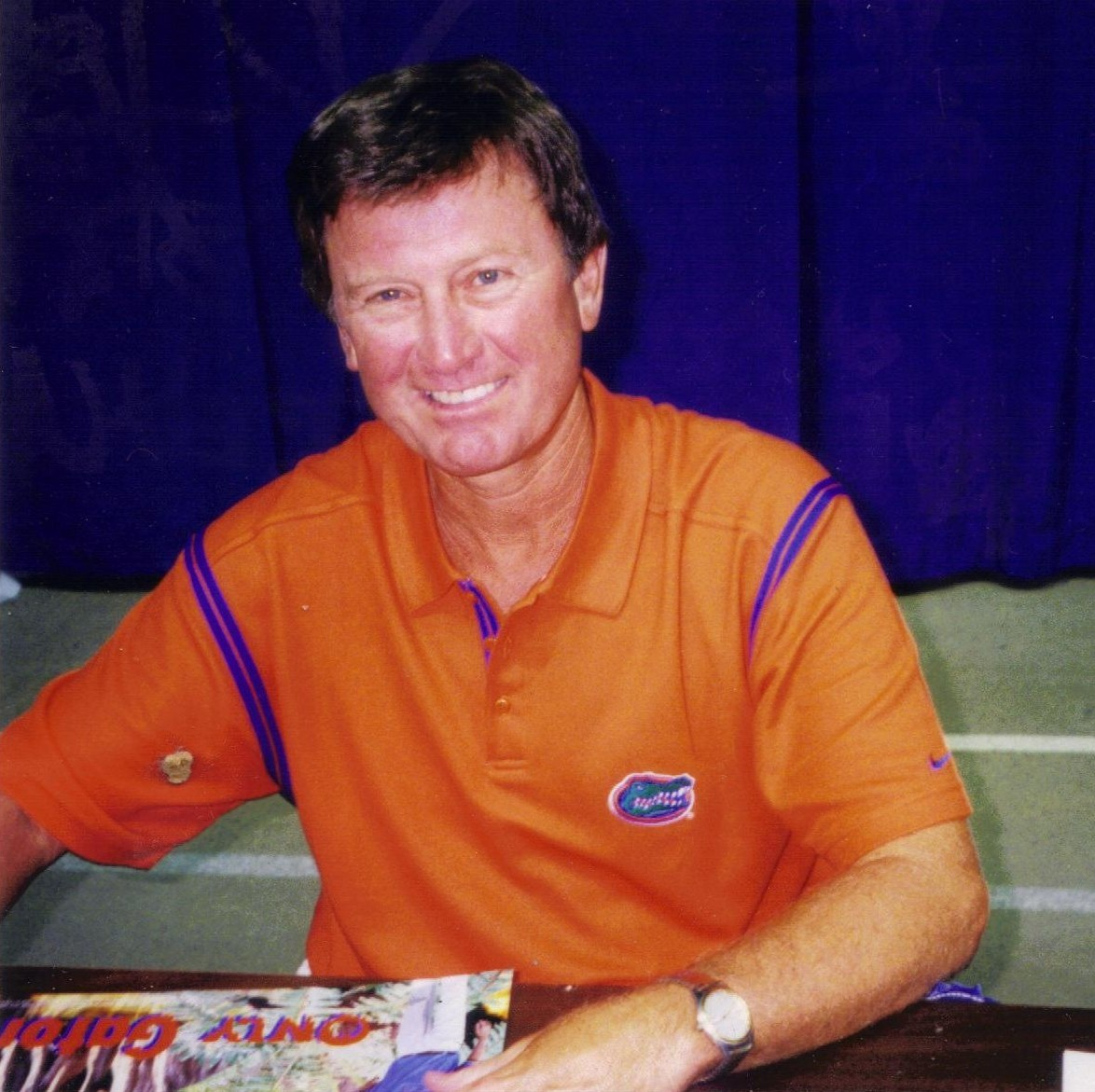
Steve Spurrier on Fan Day, 1999

Spurrier's finest moment as a coach may have been the Gators' 1997 game against the previously undefeated and national title game-bound Florida State Seminoles. Spurrier used a two-quarterback offense, rotating quarterbacks Doug Johnson and Noah Brindise in and out of the game, confusing the Florida State defense and its veteran coordinator, Mickey Andrews, and giving Spurrier more time to counsel his quarterbacks on the sidelines without having to use time-outs. Florida upset the heavily favored Seminoles 32–29.

Significantly, Spurrier is credited with changing the way the SEC played football. Spurrier employed a pass-oriented offense (known in the sports media as the "Fun 'n' Gun") in contrast to the ball-control, rush-oriented offenses that were traditionally played in the SEC. His innovative offensive schemes forced many coaches in the SEC to change their offensive and defensive play-calling.

While his offensive style used a more wide-open passing game than the SEC was accustomed to, Spurrier was also able to utilize a constant group of talented running backs. Many of them would later go on to have success at the NFL level, including Errict Rhett, Fred Taylor, Terry Jackson, and Earnest Graham.

Spurrier and his Gators accomplished a number of memorable feats during his twelve seasons in Gainesville (1990–2001), including:

- Won one national championship (1996), and played for another (1995).
- Won six SEC championships (1991, 1993, 1994, 1995, 1996, 2000).
- Named SEC Coach of the Year five times (1990, 1991, 1994, 1995, 1996).
- First Heisman Trophy-winner to coach a Heisman Trophy-winner (Danny Wuerffel).
- Won at least nine games in each of his twelve seasons, one of only three coaches in major college history to do so.
- Averaged more than ten wins per season.
- Ranked in the final top fifteen in each of his twelve seasons, including nine top-ten finishes, five final top-five rankings, and an average end-of-season ranking of 6.8.
- Appeared among the top twenty-five teams in the weekly polls 202 of a possible 203 weeks, including each of his last 202 consecutive weeks. The Gators were ranked number one in the polls twenty-nine times, appeared among the top five teams for 117 weeks, and among the nation's top ten teams for 179 weeks.
- Appeared in a bowl game in each of his last eleven seasons—every season in which the Gators were eligible—one of only five schools to do so during the same time period.
- Only coach in major college history to win as many as 120 games in his first twelve seasons at one school (an overall record of 122–27–1, with a winning percentage of .8167).
- One of only two coaches in major college history to win ten or more games in six consecutive seasons (1993–1998).
- Only college football team to score at least 500 points, including bowl games, for four consecutive years (1993–1996) since the NCAA began keeping statistics in 1937.

Spurrier is also credited with creating the nickname "The Swamp" for Ben Hill Griffin Stadium, the Gators' home field. In the early 1990s, he said, ". . . a swamp is where Gators live. We feel comfortable there, but we hope our opponents feel tentative. A swamp is hot and sticky and can be dangerous. Only Gators get out alive." Soon after becoming head coach, he insisted that the artificial turf then in use at the stadium be replaced with natural grass, and the "Swamp" remains a natural surface field today. During Spurrier's tenure, the Gators built up one of the most formidable home-field advantages in the nation; they would not lose a home SEC game until 1994, and would only suffer two more home losses to conference opponents during his 12-year run. Largely due to the formidable home-field advantage Spurrier built, he is by far the winningest coach in Florida history as his 122 wins are 52 more than runner-up Graves.

Spurrier was known for his gamesmanship while coaching Florida, doing such things as giving much-derided Georgia coach Ray Goff the nickname of "Ray Goof." His rivalry with the Tennessee Volunteers and their coach Phillip Fulmer became highly publicized, as Spurrier would gig the Volunteers after the Gators' wins over Tennessee, saying that "you can't spell 'Citrus' without 'UT,'" a reference to the Citrus Bowl, which at the time had the contractual right to select the second-place SEC football team. He also said of Peyton Manning, Tennessee's quarterback, "I know why Peyton came back for his senior year: he wanted to be a three-time Citrus Bowl MVP!"

Other memorable one-liners from Steve Spurrier included nicknaming rival Florida State University, "Free Shoes University", for the Seminoles' NCAA troubles with recruiting violations.

On January 4, 2002, Spurrier abruptly resigned as head coach, stating, "I simply believe that twelve years as head coach at a major university in the SEC is long enough."

Before Spurrier returned to coach his Gamecocks against the Gators in 2006 and 2008, his most recent visits to Gainesville were on September 2, 2006, to take part in the Gators' celebration of the 10-year anniversary of their 1996 championship season, and on September 30, 2006, when he was one of the first four inductees into the Gator Football Ring of Honor, alongside Danny Wuerffel, Emmitt Smith, and Jack Youngblood. At both appearances, Spurrier received standing ovations from the crowd.

Spurrier retains a deep affection and loyalty for his alma mater, and sometimes still accidentally says "we" when referring to the University of Florida. The feeling is mutual; Gator fans appreciate his building their program up. When he was inducted into the Gators' "Ring of Honor", Spurrier announced to the sell-out crowd at Ben Hill Griffin Stadium: "I'd just like to thank coach Ray Graves for bringing the skinny kid from Tennessee to the University of Florida." Additionally, in 2016, the university added his name to the playing surface at Ben Hill Griffin Stadium; it is now Steve Spurrier-Florida Field.

Spurrier has not let his affection for the University of Florida get in the way of a budding Florida-South Carolina rivalry, however. In 2005, his Gamecocks upset the Gators 30–22 in Columbia, costing the Gators a shot at the SEC championship. And in November 2010, he coached South Carolina to a 36–14 victory in Gainesville (their first ever on Florida Field) in a game that decided the SEC Eastern Division title.

==== Washington Redskins (2002–2003) ====
Ten days after Spurrier resigned his position at the University of Florida, he became head coach of the NFL's Washington Redskins. Spurrier's five-year, $25 million contract with the Redskins was the most lucrative coaching contract in the history of the NFL at the time.

A fast start to the 2002 season raised hopes for Spurrier's potential success. The Redskins led off the preseason in Japan, where they beat the San Francisco 49ers 38–7 in the American Bowl. The team threw for over 400 yards and was accused of running up the score, a charge frequently leveled against Spurrier at Florida. The Redskins went 4–1 in the preseason (including a 40–10 win in Tampa against Spurrier's last professional team, the Buccaneers) and won the first game of the regular season 31–23, with Shane Matthews throwing for 327 yards and 3 touchdowns against the Arizona Cardinals. However, subsequent opponents were able to slow Spurrier's offense, mainly by using disguised blitzes to disrupt the passing game. By the end of the season, the Redskins were ranked 25th (out of 32 teams) in scoring offense and finished with a 7–9 record. It was only Spurrier's second losing campaign in 18 years as a head coach, the first being his first year at Duke.

In 2003, the Redskins started 2–0 but finished 5–11, with several close losses coming down to the 4th quarter. The offense was a bit improved, but the departure of defensive coordinator Marvin Lewis to become the head coach of the Cincinnati Bengals saw the defense fade from 5th in scoring defense during the previous season to 24th in 2003. The team as a whole faded late in the season, and were outscored 85–31 over their last three games. Spurrier resigned on December 30, 2003, choosing to walk away from $15 million still owed to him over the remaining three years of his contract. In a statement released by the team, Spurrier said "I apologize to Redskins fans that we did not reach a level of success that we had all hoped... It's a long grind and I feel (that) after 20 years as a head coach there are other things I need to do. I simply believe this is the right time for me to move on because this team needs new leadership."

Spurrier's disappointing tenure as an NFL head coach has been heavily scrutinized and analysed. During his first season in Washington, Spurrier brought in several of his former stars from Florida, including quarterbacks Danny Wuerffel and Shane Matthews, leading to criticism that he played favorites. Also criticized was his decision to bring along most of his coaching staff from Florida even though they had little or no experience coaching professional football (the exception being Marvin Lewis, who was a veteran NFL coach). As the 2002 season progressed, an increasing number of philosophical, strategic, and player personnel differences began to cause a rift between Spurrier and the Washington front office, including team owner Daniel Snyder. Snyder pushed for the drafting of Tulane quarterback Patrick Ramsey in the 2002 NFL draft, and though Spurrier said that he would not play Ramsey very much during his rookie season, the coach was pressured to use him by team officials, and Ramsey was starting by game 4. The quarterback position continued to be a source of friction, particularly when, over Spurrier's objections, the front office decided to release Wuerffel before the start of Spurrier's second season. Spurrier later said that he "knew it was over" when he "wasn't allowed to pick the backup quarterback".

Spurrier spoke about his NFL coaching experience during SEC Media Days in 2014. "When I left Florida after 12 years, I thought I was going to coach in the NFL five or six years and retire to the beach, and play golf a bunch, and travel around, this, that and the other. But that was a bad plan. It was. Later you found out that was not a real good idea. But that's the way I was thinking back then." After retiring from coaching, Spurrier further reflected on his NFL stint in several interviews. In a 2016 appearance on the Paul Finebaum Show, Spurrier reflected that the Redskins might not have been the best choice for his jump to the NFL. "I went to the team that offered the most money instead of the best situation", he said. And in 2015, he told David Feherty that, "The owner and the personnel guys, they picked the team. I couldn’t even pick the quarterback the second year. So I knew it wasn’t going to work, but that's ok. I probably didn’t do a very good job, and the situation wasn’t what I was looking for, so it was time to move on." In an interview with The Washington Post in 2019, Spurrier said of his time in Washington that "I did a lousy job. The GM did a lousy job. He happened to be the owner, so who needed to go?"

==== South Carolina (2005–2015) ====
Throughout the 2004 football season, various sources openly speculated about Spurrier returning to coach in the college ranks once again, preferably for a program located in the southeastern United States and even more preferably, somewhere in his beloved Southeastern Conference. The University of Florida was in the process of taking applications for a new coach after Spurrier's successor at Florida, Ron Zook, was fired following the 2004 season. The timing seemed perfect for Spurrier's return to the Gators and Spurrier initially said that he wanted to be considered for his old job, but later removed his name from consideration stating that "12 years at Florida was probably long enough." Soon afterwards, rumors began circulating that South Carolina Gamecocks' Athletic Director, Mike McGee, was actively pursuing Spurrier and that Spurrier was considering the Gamecocks' offer. Again, the timing was perfect and on November 22, South Carolina coach Lou Holtz announced his retirement and, during his final press conference, hinted that Spurrier might replace him. The next day, months of rumors were put to rest as Spurrier was introduced as South Carolina's new head coach. Spurrier had signed a seven-year deal that paid him $1.25 million per year and the Steve Spurrier era began for the Gamecocks.

In 2005, his first season as the Gamecocks' new head coach, Spurrier led his South Carolina Gamecocks with newfound humility. The Gamecocks, who were not expected to have a winning season by most pundits, rattled off a five-game SEC winning streak for the first time in their fourteen-year SEC history. Included among those victories were historic wins at Tennessee (16–15) – the program's first win in Knoxville – and against then 12th-ranked Florida (30–22), who South Carolina had not beaten since 1939. The Associated Press named Spurrier the SEC Coach of the Year, and the Gamecocks finished the 2005 season with a 7–5 record and a trip to the Independence Bowl. In the bowl game, they lost to Missouri 38–31.

Two days prior to South Carolina's 2006 season opener, Spurrier announced that he would kick off the athletics department's capital campaign with a $250,000 donation over five years. Spurrier's Gamecocks opened the 2006 season with a 15–0 win over Mississippi State in Starkville, where he was 0–2 while coaching the Florida Gators. With the victory, he reached 150 wins for his college coaching career. On September 30, Spurrier was inducted into the Gator Football Ring of Honor in a pre-game ceremony in Gainesville. Later in the season on November 11, Spurrier returned to "The Swamp" to face off against his former Gators team, which was then ranked sixth in the BCS rankings. Trailing 17–16, the Gamecocks had a chance to win with a 48-yard field goal attempt on the last play of the game. However, Ryan Succop's kick was blocked as time expired in a repeat of an earlier blocked extra-point attempt.

In the final game of the 2006 regular season, Spurrier led the Gamecocks to victory over in-state rival Clemson at Death Valley. Trailing 28–14 in the third quarter, South Carolina scored seventeen unanswered points to lead 31–28. With only seconds remaining, Clemson's field goal attempt missed wide left and the Gamecocks celebrated their first victory over Clemson in five years.

On December 2, 2006, amid speculation he was a candidate for head coaching jobs at Miami and Alabama, Spurrier received a contract extension through 2012 and a raise from $1.25 million to $1.75 million annually. Spurrier and the Gamecocks went on to defeat the Houston Cougars in the Liberty Bowl on December 29, and finished the season 8–5. All five of the Gamecocks' 2006 losses were to ranked opponents. Spurrier became the first head coach in Gamecock football history to take a team to a bowl game in each of his first two seasons.

The 2007 football season, got off to a quick start winning at SEC rival Georgia early in the season as well as Louisiana-Lafayette and South Carolina State, and climbed into the top 10 in the national rankings. South Carolina stumbled down the stretch dropping the final five games, including a home loss in the season finale to arch-rival Clemson. The 6–6 (3–5 SEC) season record marked the first non-winning college season for Spurrier since his first season at Duke in 1987.

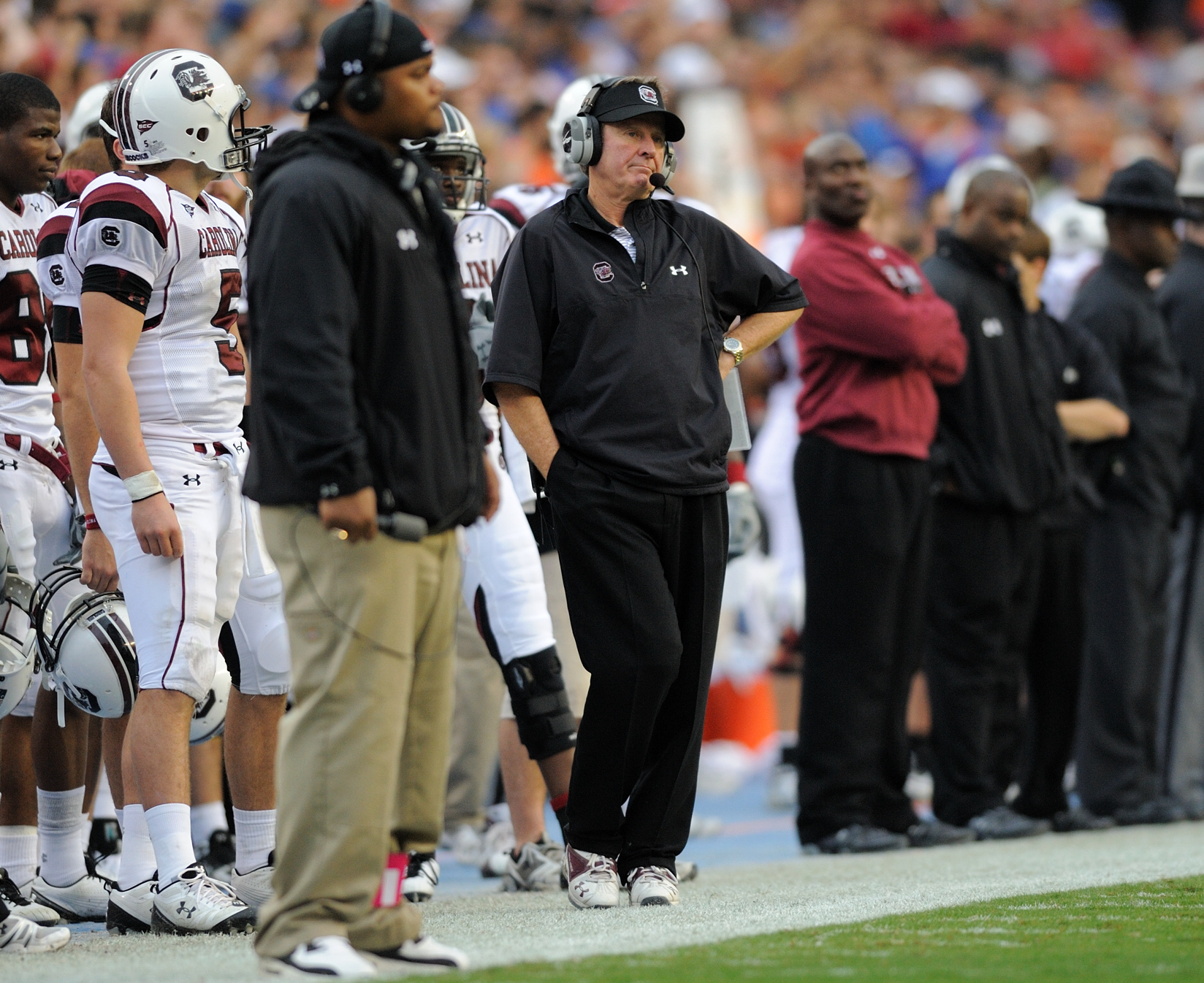
Spurrier stands on the sidelines during the Gamecocks' November 15, 2008, game against Florida.

Spurrier won his 100th SEC game on October 11, 2008, coaching the Gamecocks to a 24–17 victory over Kentucky. In his ten seasons as the Gamecocks' head coach, Spurrier has beaten each of South Carolina's traditional SEC Eastern Division rivals at least five times. Against their annual SEC Eastern Division opponents, his ten teams have posted an 8–2 record against Kentucky, 8–2 against Vanderbilt, 5–5 against Tennessee, 5–5 against Georgia, 5–5 against Florida, and 2–1 against Missouri who began competing in the SEC in 2012. Against South Carolina's major in-state rival, Clemson, Spurrier's Gamecocks have gone 6–4. While Spurrier's teams at South Carolina have shown flashes of his old "Fun 'n' Gun" offense, they have mostly relied on stout defense to win upsets. The Gamecocks have been bowl eligible every year Spurrier has been their head coach, a feat no other Carolina coach has accomplished. Also, the Gamecocks have been ranked in the AP Poll Top 25 at some point during the season in nine out of Spurrier's ten years at South Carolina.

In 2009, Steve Spurrier's Gamecocks upset #4 Ole Miss 16–10 in Columbia, their first victory over a Top 5 team. In the 2009 season, South Carolina finished with a 7–5 regular season record. They lost to Connecticut in the PapaJohns.com Bowl 20–7.

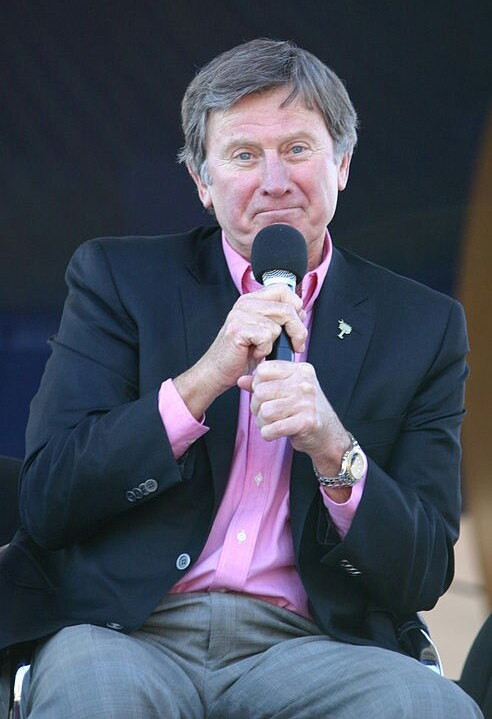
Spurrier in 2010

Spurrier's Gamecocks won the SEC Eastern Division championship for the first time in school history in 2010, clinching the title with a convincing 36–14 victory at "The Swamp" over the Florida Gators. It was a season of firsts for South Carolina, including their first win at Florida, first win over a No. 1 ranked team (Alabama), and first time sweeping the November "Orange Crush" portion of their schedule with wins over Tennessee, Florida and Clemson. Following a 9–3 regular season and an appearance in the SEC championship game, Spurrier was named SEC Coach of the Year by his fellow coaches in the conference.

The Gamecocks had another strong season in 2011, beating every opponent in the division. However, losses to Arkansas and Auburn cost them a return appearance in the SEC title game. With a 34–13 rout of Clemson, the Gamecocks won 10 games for only the second time in their 119-year football history. In the 2012 Capital One Bowl, the Gamecocks dispatched Nebraska 30–13 to win their school-record 11th game. They also finished eighth in the AP Poll and ninth in the Coaches' Poll—their first top-ten finishes in a major media poll in school history.

In 2012 Spurrier led the Gamecocks to their second-consecutive regular season with double-digit wins—something no Gamecock team had ever achieved. The 2012 regular season culminated with the annual season-ending game against Clemson at Clemson's Memorial Stadium. Spurrier and his Gamecocks emerged with a fourth consecutive double-digit victory over the Tigers. That win was also Spurrier's 65th win with the Gamecocks, vaulting him past Rex Enright to become the winningest coach in South Carolina's history. Spurrier led the Gamecocks to a thrilling 33–28 victory in the 2013 Outback Bowl against the winningest program in college football, the Michigan Wolverines. The victory elevated the Gamecocks to an 11–2 record for the second consecutive season. Additionally, by finishing 8th in the Associated Press poll and 7th in the Coaches poll, South Carolina finished in Top 10 of both polls for the second year in a row.

During the 2013 season, Spurrier led his Gamecocks to a third consecutive 11–2 record. Only two other programs (Alabama and Oregon) have won 11 or more games each of the last three seasons (2011–13). During the season, the Gamecocks defeated three teams that finished ranked in the Top 10 in the final AP Poll (Missouri, University of Central Florida, and Clemson). The Gamecocks were the only team to accomplish this feat. They also became the first and only team to defeat two teams that won BCS bowl games. Following their 34–24 win over Wisconsin in the Capital One Bowl, the Gamecocks were ranked 4th in the final AP Poll, setting a record for the program. This also marked the third straight year that the Gamecocks finished with a Top 10 ranking in the final AP Poll. While defeating Clemson, again, the Gamecocks ran their winning streak over their archrival to five games, which was the longest winning streak in the rivalry, for either team, since 1940. The 31–17 score marked the fifth straight double-digit margin of victory over their ACC foe. Also, for the fifth straight year, the Gamecocks defense held the Tigers to 17 points or less. They would go on to defeat Wisconsin in the Capital One bowl 34–24 and would finish the year ranked #4, their highest finish ever in a season.

The 2014 Gamecocks endured a disappointing season, going 7–6 overall and 3–5 against SEC opponents, and finishing in fifth place in their division. With 4 losses and only 2 wins by the middle of the 2015 season, Spurrier announced to his team and staff on October 12, 2015, that he had resigned as head coach. He publicly confirmed his intentions at a press conference the following day. Spurrier reiterated that he was not officially retiring, but added he would probably never coach again.

A popular tradition, started during the Sparky Woods era at USC, occurs on the last Saturday of July when the University of South Carolina athletics department hosts the annual "Steve Spurrier Ladies Football Clinic." Only female fans are invited to attend the clinic where football coaches and players discuss the X's and O's with fans who want to understand the game better. All attendees get a tour of the football facilities, and finish the day running onto the football field through the players' tunnel accompanied by artificial smoke and theme music in the same way the team does during the season. The event was hosted by Spurrier and his wife Jerri.

==== Orlando Apollos (2019) ====
In April 2018, Spurrier was named the head coach of the Orlando Apollos of the Alliance of American Football (AAF), a new spring football league that was slated to begin play in February 2019. Spurrier was the first coach or player to sign with the AAF, as he thought the four to five month per year commitment made the new league a "perfect job" for him to get back into coaching, giving him an opportunity to finish his career on another winning note – "It's a mulligan in life," he explained.

The AAF did not finish the season due to league-wide financial difficulties. The Apollos led the standings with a 7–1 record when the league shut down, leading Spurrier to claim that they should be named the first and only AAF "regular season champions".

== After coaching ==
In July 2016, Spurrier returned to the University of Florida to serve as an ambassador and consultant for the athletic program. On September 3, 2016, the field at Ben Hill Griffin Stadium was renamed to "Steve Spurrier-Florida Field at Ben Hill Griffin Stadium" in honor of Spurrier's achievements at the university.

Since retiring from coaching, Spurrier has been regularly tapped as a guest on a wide variety of national and local TV and radio shows and podcasts which discuss college football. Most notably, Spurrier hosted his own show for several months on SiriusXM Satellite Radio, has been a co-host for podcasts with former player Shane Matthews, and is a regular guest or co-host on sports programming broadcast by WRUF radio in Gainesville.

=== Spurrier's Gridiron Grille ===
In 2021, Spurrier opened Spurrier's Gridiron Grill in the Celebration Pointe entertainment complex in Gainesville. The establishment is a sports bar / restaurant that features large displays of memorabilia from throughout Spurrier's playing and coaching career, including his Heisman Trophy. It also includes an area for hosting live radio broadcasts or podcasts which has hosted weekly call-in shows for Florida's football and basketball coaches.''

== Personal life ==
Spurrier married his college sweetheart, the former Jerri Starr, on September 14, 1966, during his senior year at the University of Florida. They have four children — Lisa, Amy, Steve Jr., and Scott, as well as 14 grandchildren.

While he was a University of Florida student, Steve Spurrier was a member of Alpha Tau Omega fraternity (Alpha Omega chapter) and Florida Blue Key leadership honorary. As a coach, he was inducted into Omicron Delta Kappa at the University of Florida in 1991.

Spurrier's oldest son, Steve Spurrier Jr., has been an assistant football coach for several years, including stints as a receivers coach on his father's staffs in Washington and South Carolina and on Bob Stoops's staff at Oklahoma. Since 2025, Steve Jr. has worked with quarterbacks as an offensive analyst at Florida. Spurrier's younger son, Scott, played wide receiver for the Gamecocks through the 2009 season. Scott Spurrier has also coached and served on his father's staff with the Orlando Apollos.

== Career statistics ==
=== College ===
Year	Team	Passing						
Year	Team	Comp	Att	Yards	Pct	TD	Int	Rtg
1964	Florida	65	114	943	57.0	6	10	126.3
1965	Florida	**148**	**287**	**1,893**	51.6	**14**	13	114.0
1966	Florida	**179**	**291**	**2,012**	**61.5**	16	8	132.2
Total		392	692	4,848	56.6	36	31	123.7

Note: Bold indicates SEC leader

=== NFL ===
Year	Team	Games			Passing								Punting		
Year	Team	GP	GS	Record	Cmp	Att	Pct	Yds	Avg	TD	Int	Rtg	Punts	Yards	Y/P
1967	SF	14	2	0–2	23	50	46.0	211	4.2	0	7	18.4	73	2,745	37.6
1968	SF	14	0	0–0	—	—	—	—	—	—	—	—	68	2,651	39.0
1969	SF	6	4	2–2	81	146	55.5	926	6.3	5	11	54.8	12	468	**39.0**
1970	SF	14	0	0–0	3	4	**75.0**	49	**12.3**	1	0	**155.2**	**75**	**2,877**	38.4
1971	SF	6	0	0–0	1	4	25.0	46	11.5	0	0	75.0	2	77	38.5
1972	SF	13	9	6–2–1	147	269	54.6	**1,983**	7.4	**18**	**16**	75.9	—	—	—
1973	SF	11	5	2–3	83	157	52.9	882	5.6	4	7	59.5	—	—	—
1974	SF	3	0	0–0	1	3	33.3	2	0.7	0	0	42.4	—	—	—
1975	SF	11	6	3–3	102	207	49.3	1,151	5.6	5	7	60.3	—	—	—
1976	TB	14	12	0–12	**156**	**311**	50.2	1,628	5.2	7	12	57.1	—	—	—
Total		106	38	13–24–1	597	1,151	51.9	6,878	6.0	40	60	60.1	230	8,818	38.3

== Head coaching record ==
=== USFL ===
Team	Year	Regular season					Postseason		
Team	Year	Won	Lost	Ties	Win %	Finish	Won	Lost	Win %
TB	1983	11	7	0	.611	3rd in Central Div.	did not qualify		
TB	1984	14	4	0	.778	2nd in Southern Div.	0	1	.000
TB	1985	10	8	0	.556	5th in Eastern Con.	0	1	.000
Total		35	19	0	.648		0	2	.000

=== College ===
Year	Team	Overall	Conference	Standing	Bowl/playoffs	Coaches^{#}	AP^{°}
Duke Blue Devils (Atlantic Coast Conference) (1987–1989)
1987	Duke	5–6	2–5	7th			
1988	Duke	7–3–1	3–3–1	6th			
1989	Duke	8–4	6–1	T–1st	L All-American		
Duke:		20–13–1	11–9–1				
Florida Gators (Southeastern Conference) (1990–2001)
1990	Florida	9–2	6–1	1st (Note: Florida was ineligible for the SEC title, a bowl game, and the Coaches' poll in 1990 due to NCAA violations under the previous coach.)			13
1991	Florida	10–2	7–0	1st	L Sugar	8	7
1992	Florida	9–4	6–2	T–1st (Eastern)	W Gator^{†}	11	10
1993	Florida	11–2	7–1	1st (Eastern)	W Sugar^{†}	4	5
1994	Florida	10–2–1	7–1	1st (Eastern)	L Sugar^{†}	7	7
1995	Florida	12–1	8–0	1st (Eastern)	L Fiesta^{†}	3	2
1996	Florida	12–1	8–0	1st (Eastern)	W Sugar^{†}	1	1
1997	Florida	10–2	6–2	T–2nd (Eastern)	W Florida Citrus	6	4
1998	Florida	10–2	7–1	2nd (Eastern)	W Orange^{†}	6	5
1999	Florida	9–4	7–1	1st (Eastern)	L Florida Citrus	14	12
2000	Florida	10–3	7–1	1st (Eastern)	L Sugar^{†}	11	10
2001	Florida	10–2	6–2	2nd (Eastern)	W Orange^{†}	3	3
Florida:		122–27–1	82–12				
South Carolina Gamecocks (Southeastern Conference) (2005–2015)
2005	South Carolina	7–5	5–3	T–2nd (Eastern)	L Independence		
2006	South Carolina	8–5	3–5	5th (Eastern)	W Liberty		
2007	South Carolina	6–6	3–5	T–4th (Eastern)			
2008	South Carolina	7–6	4–4	T–3rd (Eastern)	L Outback		
2009	South Carolina	7–6	3–5	T–4th (Eastern)	L PapaJohns.com		
2010	South Carolina	9–5	5–3	1st (Eastern)	L Chick-fil-A	22	22
2011	South Carolina	11–2	6–2	2nd (Eastern)	W Capital One	8	9
2012	South Carolina	11–2	6–2	3rd (Eastern)	W Outback	7	8
2013	South Carolina	11–2	6–2	2nd (Eastern)	W Capital One	4	4
2014	South Carolina	7–6	3–5	T–4th (Eastern)	W Independence		
2015	South Carolina	2–4	0–4	(Note: Spurrier resigned on October 12, 2015. Shawn Elliott was named interim head coach and led the Gamecocks to a final record of 3–9.)			
South Carolina:		86–49	44–40				
Total:		228–89–2					
National championship Conference title Conference division title or championship game berth
^{†}Indicates Bowl Coalition, Bowl Alliance or BCS bowl.; ^{#}Rankings from final Coaches Poll.; ^{°}Rankings from final AP Poll.

=== NFL ===
Team	Year	Regular season					Postseason			
Team	Year	Won	Lost	Ties	Win %	Finish	Won	Lost	Win %	Result
WAS	2002	7	9	0	.438	3rd in NFC East	–	–	–	–
WAS	2003	5	11	0	.313	3rd in NFC East	–	–	–	–
WAS total		12	20	0	.375		0	0	.000	
Total		12	20	0	.375		0	0	.000	

=== AAF ===
Team	Year	Regular season					Postseason			
Team	Year	Won	Lost	Ties	Win %	Finish	Won	Lost	Win %	Result
ORL	2019	7	1	0	.857	1st (Note: The Alliance of American Football folded after playing eight games of a planned ten-game schedule, at which point the Apollos held a two game lead in the standings.)	—	—	—	

== Awards and honors ==
=== Player ===
- Heisman Trophy (1966)
- UPI Player of the Year (1966)
- SN Player of the Year (1966)
- Walter Camp Memorial Trophy (1966)
- Chic Harley Award (1966)
- Unanimous All-American (1966)
- First-team All-American (1965)
- SEC Player of the Year (1966)
- 2× First-team All-SEC (1965, 1966)
- Florida Football Ring of Honor (2006)
- National High School Hall of Fame
- College Football Hall of Fame (player)

=== Coach ===
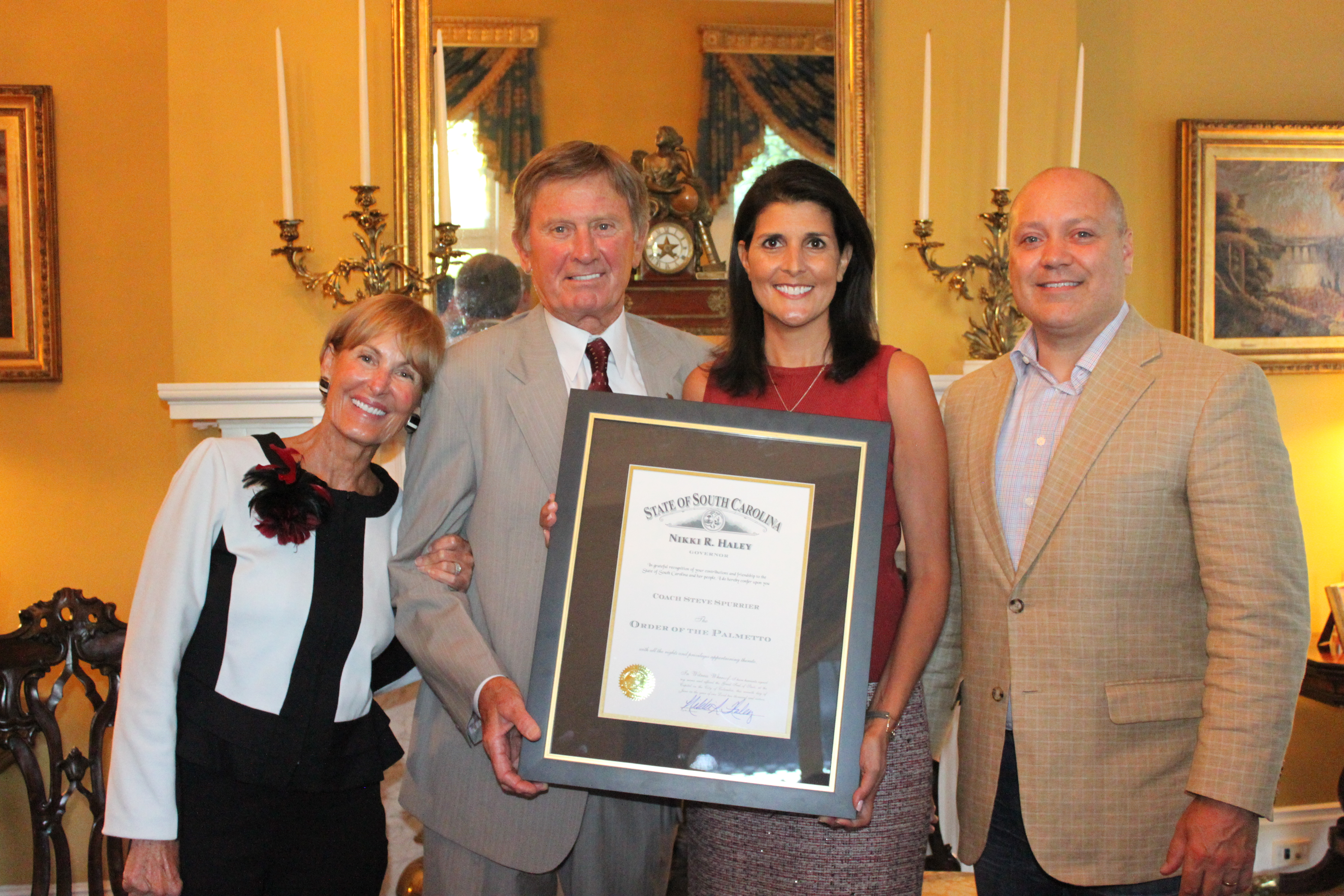
Spurrier receiving the Order of the Palmetto from Governor Nikki Haley.

- National champion (1996)
- 6× SEC (1991, 1993–1996, 2000)
- ACC champion (1989)
- 8× SEC Eastern Division champion (1992–1996, 1999–2000, 2010)
- AAF champion (2019)
- 7× SEC Coach of the Year (1990–1991, 1994–1996, 2005, 2010)
- 2× ACC Coach of the Year (1988–1989)
- FWAA First-Year Coach of the Year (2005)
- University of Florida Hall of Fame
- University of Florida Athletic Hall of Fame,
- South Carolina Football Hall of Fame.
- South Carolina Order of the Palmetto
- College Football Hall of Fame (coach)

== Coaching tree ==
Assistant coaches under Spurrier who became head coaches:

- Jim Bates: Miami Dolphins (2004; interim)
- Kerwin Bell: Jacksonville University (2007–2015), Valdosta State (2016–2018), Western Carolina (2021–present)
- Shane Beamer: South Carolina (2021–present)
- Shawn Elliott: South Carolina (2015; interim), Georgia State (2017–2023)
- Jedd Fisch: Arizona (2021–2023), Washington (2024–present)
- Carl Franks: Duke (1999–2003)
- Hue Jackson: Oakland Raiders (2011), Cleveland Browns (2016–2018), Grambling State (2022–2023)
- Marvin Lewis: Cincinnati Bengals (2003–2018)
- G. A. Mangus: Delaware Valley University (2002–2005)
- Sammy McCorkle: Dartmouth (2024–present)
- Bob Pruett: Marshall (1996–2004)
- Rick Stockstill: Middle Tennessee (2006–2023)
- Bob Stoops: Oklahoma (1999–2016)
- Charlie Strong: Louisville (2010–2013), Texas (2014–2016), South Florida (2017–2019)
- Buddy Teevens: Stanford (2002–2004), Dartmouth (1987–1991, 2005–2023)
- John Thompson: East Carolina (2003–2004)
- Barry Wilson: Duke (1990–1993)
- Eric Wolford: Youngstown State (2010–2014)
- Ron Zook: Florida (2002–2004), Illinois (2005–2011)

== See also ==
- List of college football career coaching wins leaders
- List of Florida Gators football All-Americans
- List of Florida Gators in the NFL draft
- List of University of Florida alumni

== Bibliography ==
- Carlson, Norm, University of Florida Football Vault: The History of the Florida Gators, Whitman Publishing, LLC, Atlanta, Georgia (2007). ISBN 0-7948-2298-3.
- Chastain, Bill (2002). The Steve Spurrier Story: From Heisman to Head Ballcoach. Taylor Trade Publishing. ISBN 978-0878333165.
- Golenbock, Peter, Go Gators! An Oral History of Florida's Pursuit of Gridiron Glory, Legends Publishing, LLC, St. Petersburg, Florida (2002). ISBN 0-9650782-1-3.
- Hairston, Jack, Tales from the Gator Swamp: A Collection of the Greatest Gator Stories Ever Told, Sports Publishing, LLC, Champaign, Illinois (2002). ISBN 1-58261-514-4.
- Henry, Ran (2014). Spurrier: How the Ball Coach Taught the South to Play Football. Guilford, Connecticut: Lyons Press. ISBN 978-0762791842.
- McCarthy, Kevin M., Fightin' Gators: A History of University of Florida Football, Arcadia Publishing, Mount Pleasant, South Carolina (2000). ISBN 978-0-7385-0559-6.
- McEwen, Tom, The Gators: A Story of Florida Football, The Strode Publishers, Huntsville, Alabama (1974). ISBN 0-87397-025-X.
- Nash, Noel, ed., The Gainesville Sun Presents The Greatest Moments in Florida Gators Football, Sports Publishing, Inc., Champaign, Illinois (1998). ISBN 1-57167-196-X.
- Proctor, Samuel, & Wright Langley, Gator History: A Pictorial History of the University of Florida, South Star Publishing Company, Gainesville, Florida (1986). ISBN 0-938637-00-2.
- Spurrer, Steve with Buddy Martin (2016). Head Ball Coach: My Life in Football. New Rider Press. ISBN 978-0399574665.
