= 1992 Orange Bowl =

1992 Federal Express Orange Bowl
- 58th Orange Bowl; NCAA AP Poll National Championship Game
- The Miami Orange Bowl in Miami, Florida, hosted the Orange Bowl.
Miami Hurricanes	Nebraska Cornhuskers
(11–0)	(9–1–1)
Big East	Big Eight
22	0
Head coach: Dennis Erickson	Head coach: Tom Osborne
AP / Coaches; 1 / 2	AP / Coaches; 11 / 11
	1	2	3	4	Total
Miami	13	0	9	0	22
Nebraska	0	0	0	0	0
- Date: January 1, 1992
- Season: 1991
- Stadium: Orange Bowl
- Location: Miami, Florida
- MVP: Larry Jones (Miami FB)
- Favorite: Miami by 10 points (44.5)
- Referee: Ron Winter (Big Ten)
- Attendance: 77,747

United States TV coverage
- Network: NBC
- Announcers: Dick Enberg, Bill Walsh and John Dockery

The 1992 Orange Bowl was the 58th edition of the college football bowl game, played at the Orange Bowl in Miami, Florida, on January 1. Part of the 1991–92 bowl game season, it matched the top-ranked Miami Hurricanes of the Big East Conference and the #11 Nebraska Cornhuskers of the Big Eight Conference. Favored Miami won 22–0.

It was a rematch of the 1984 and 1989 editions, both Miami wins. This shutout win gave the Hurricanes their fourth national championship (1983, 1987, 1989), capping their "decade of dominance."

== Teams ==
=== Miami ===
Miami won all eleven games in the regular season; it was their first season in the Big East.

=== Nebraska ===
The Huskers lost at home to Washington in September and tied Colorado on the road in early November.

== Game summary ==
Playing on their home field, the Hurricanes raced to a quick start as quarterback Gino Torretta threw an 8-yard touchdown to wide receiver Kevin Williams, which was followed by two 24-yard field goals by Carlos Huerta. After a scoreless second quarter, it was 13–0 at halftime. Miami dominated the second half with a touchdown run by fullback Larry Jones and a third field goal by Huerta, this one from 54 yards. The score was 22–0 after three quarters, and the Miami defense successfully held off Nebraska, as the fourth quarter was scoreless.

=== Scoring ===
First quarter

- Miami – Kevin Williams 8 pass from Gino Torretta (Carlos Huerta kick), 11:04
- Miami – Huerta 24-yard field goal, 5:04
- Miami – Huerta 24-yard field goal, 4:02

Second quarter
No scoring
Third quarter

- Miami – Larry Jones 1-yard run (Torretta pass failed), 11:19
- Miami – Huerta 54-yard field goal, 2:33

Fourth quarter
No scoring

== Statistics ==
Statistics	Miami	Nebraska
First downs	25	9
Rushes–yards	44–182	38–82
Passing yards	257	89
Passes	19–41–2	7–19–2
Total offense	81–439	57–171
Return yards	66	3
Punts–average	5–33	8–39
Fumbles–lost	3–0	3–2
Turnovers by	2	4
Penalties-yards	12–143	6–36
Time of possession	34:29	25:31

== NBC Control room fire ==
During coverage of the final quarter, two power feeder cables that were originating coverage into NBC's main production truck accidentally caught itself on fire, forcing all 12 cameras and all NBC stations to knock off the air with an identification slide for 18 seconds. After the video portion returned, NBC was forced to switch to a scrambled Japanese feed of the game off of JOTX, with Japanese audio for 30 seconds before silencing their audio portions with a voiceover, "Ladies and Gentlemen, we are experiencing technical difficulties. Please stand by". A teletext was then shown afterwards, "Sorry for the inconvenience, we have been experiencing transmission difficulties due to atmospheric conditions".

While the teletext remained on screen, NBC Sports announcers Gayle Gardner and Paul Maguire then returned on air with an announcement before describing an action between both teams from NBC's studios in New York. 14 minutes later, Dick Enberg apologized to its viewers that a major power failure has knocked out their cameras. At that point, NBC was forced to borrow one camera from Japanese network JOTX for parts of the game.

== Aftermath ==
The win completed a perfect season for the Hurricanes, maintaining their #1 ranking in the AP Poll, but they did not receive the top ranking in the Coaches' Poll, which went to Washington of the Pac-10 Conference. The Huskies, second in the AP, had achieved an identical 12–0 record, completed with a 34–14 win over #4 Michigan in the Rose Bowl. For a second consecutive year, major college football finished with two teams splitting the title, which led the major athletic conferences to form the Bowl Coalition in the following year to help better determine a national champion.

A fantasy article in Sports Illustrated titled "The Dream Game" had Washington narrowly defeat Miami in a playoff.

The shutout was the first for Nebraska in over eighteen years (and remains their only shutout in a bowl); they dropped to fifteenth in the final AP poll. It was the Huskers' fifth consecutive bowl loss, a streak that extended to seven.

Nebraska and Miami faced off in another Orange Bowl rematch three years later, and Nebraska finally won. It broke the Huskers' seven-game losing streak in bowls and vaulted them to the first of two consecutive national titles. A four-game winning streak in bowls began, with three national championships (1994, 1995, 1997) in four seasons at the end of head coach Tom Osborne's career in Lincoln.

== See also ==
- Miami–Nebraska football rivalry
