= Dave Hart =

American football player, coach, and college athletics administrator

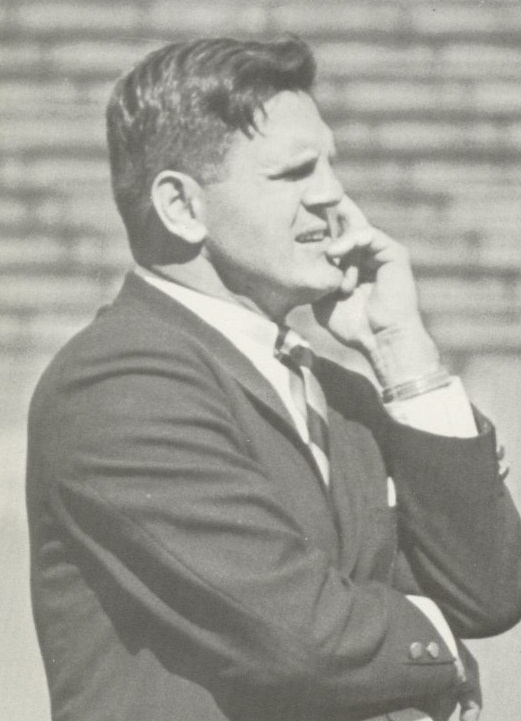
- Hart from The 1967 Owl, Pittsburgh yearbook

Biographical details
- Born: May 24, 1925; Connellsville, Pennsylvania, U.S.
- Died: March 14, 2009 (aged 83)

Playing career
- 1950: Saint Vincent

Coaching career (HC unless noted)
- 1962–1963: Kentucky (assistant)
- 1964–1965: Navy (DB)
- 1966–1968: Pittsburgh

Administrative career (AD unless noted)
- 1973–1978: Louisville
- 1978–1986: Missouri
- 1987–1991: SoCon (commissioner)

Head coaching record
- Overall: 3–27

David R. Hart (May 24, 1925 – March 14, 2009) was an American football player, coach, and college athletics administrator. He served as the head football coach at the University of Pittsburgh from 1966 to 1968, compiling a record of 3–27.

== Biography ==
Hart was the athletic director at the University of Louisville from 1973 to 1978. He also served in the same capacity at the University of Missouri from 1978 to 1986, before he was appointed as the commissioner of the Southern Conference.

Hart was a native of Connellsville, Pennsylvania. He coached high school football in Pennsylvania for eleven years before moving to the college ranks in 1962, when he became an assistant coach at the University of Kentucky.

After two seasons at Kentucky, Hart moved to the United States Naval Academy, where he coached the defensive backfield in 1964 and 1965.

Hart died on March 14, 2009, at the age of eighty-three.

His son, Dave Hart Jr., was the vice chancellor and director of athletics at the University of Tennessee. Before, he was the executive director of athletics at his alma mater, assisting Alabama athletic director Mal Moore. Previously, he spent twelve years as Florida State's athletic director and at East Carolina University in the same role.

His grandson, Rick Hart, is the athletic director at Southern Methodist University. Rick was previously athletic director at University of Tennessee at Chattanooga.

== Head coaching record ==
Year	Team	Overall	Conference	Standing	Bowl/playoffs
Pittsburgh Panthers (NCAA University Division independent) (1966–1968)
1966	Pittsburgh	1–9			
1967	Pittsburgh	1–9			
1968	Pittsburgh	1–9			
Pittsburgh:		3–27			
Total:		3–27			
