= 1966 Pittsburgh Panthers football team =

American college football season

1966 Pittsburgh Panthers football
- Conference: Independent
- Record: 1–9
- Head coach: Dave Hart (1st season)
- Home stadium: Pitt Stadium

1966 NCAA University Division independents football records
	Conf.					Overall
Team	W		L		T	W		L		T
No. 1 Notre Dame		–		–		9	–	0	–	1
Colgate		–		–		8	–	1	–	1
No. 8 Georgia Tech		–		–		9	–	2	–	0
Army		–		–		8	–	2	–	0
Dayton		–		–		8	–	2	–	0
Houston		–		–		8	–	2	–	0
Memphis State		–		–		7	–	2	–	0
No. 9 Miami (FL)		–		–		8	–	2	–	1
Virginia Tech		–		–		8	–	2	–	1
Syracuse		–		–		8	–	3	–	0
Colorado State		–		–		7	–	3	–	0
New Mexico State		–		–		7	–	3	–	0
West Texas State		–		–		7	–	3	–	0
Villanova		–		–		6	–	3	–	0
Holy Cross		–		–		6	–	3	–	1
Southern Miss		–		–		6	–	4	–	0
Texas Western		–		–		6	–	4	–	0
Tulane		–		–		5	–	4	–	1
Florida State		–		–		6	–	5	–	0
Buffalo		–		–		5	–	5	–	0
Penn State		–		–		5	–	5	–	0
Air Force		–		–		4	–	6	–	0
Boston College		–		–		4	–	6	–	0
Navy		–		–		4	–	6	–	0
Utah State		–		–		4	–	6	–	0
Xavier		–		–		4	–	6	–	0
Pacific (CA)		–		–		4	–	7	–	0
San Jose State		–		–		3	–	7	–	0
Pittsburgh		–		–		1	–	9	–	0
Rankings from AP Poll

The 1966 Pittsburgh Panthers football team represented the University of Pittsburgh as an independent during the 1966 NCAA University Division football season. The team compiled a 1–9 record under head coach Dave Hart. The team's statistical leaders included Ed James with 1,162 passing yards and Mike Raklewicz with 324 rushing yards.

== Schedule ==
Date	Opponent	Site	Result	Attendance	Source
September 17	at No. 4 UCLA	Los Angeles Memorial Coliseum; Los Angeles, CA	L 14–57	35,692	
September 24	Duke	Pitt Stadium; Pittsburgh, PA	L 7–14	24,684	
October 1	at California	California Memorial Stadium; Berkeley, CA	L 15–30	42,701	
October 8	West Virginia	Pitt Stadium; Pittsburgh, PA (Backyard Brawl)	W 17–14	32,345	
October 15	Navy	Pitt Stadium; Pittsburgh, PA	L 7–24	39,029	
October 22	at Army	Michie Stadium; West Point, NY	L 0–28	32,000	
October 29	at Syracuse	Archbold Stadium; Syracuse, NY (rivalry)	L 7–33	30,000	
November 5	at No. 1 Notre Dame	Notre Dame Stadium; Notre Dame, IN (rivalry)	L 0–40	59,075	
November 11	at Miami (FL)	Miami Orange Bowl; Miami, FL	L 14–38	35,035	
November 19	Penn State	Pitt Stadium; Pittsburgh, PA (rivalry)	L 24–48	30,362	
Rankings from AP Poll released prior to the game

== Preseason ==
On December 6, the University of Pittsburgh hired Dave Hart to be their twenty-fifth head football coach. He was the defensive backfield coach for the Navy Midshipmen the previous two years. Coach Hart only retained Steve Petro, guard coach, and Walter Cummins, assistant athletic director, from Michelosen's staff, and brought defensive line coach Jim Royer from the Naval Academy. He then managed to fill out his staff with future head coaches: Leeman Bennett (Atlanta Falcons), Dick Bestwick (University of Virginia), Bill Neal (Indiana University of Pennsylvania), Frank Cignetti (West Virginia), and Bill Lewis (Georgia Tech).

Coach Hart opened his first spring practice on March 22. Sixty-three Panthers assembled on Trees Field for daily practices until the final intra-squad game on April 23. In front of 5,000 diehard fans, fullback and captain Jim Flanigan scored on a 2-yard run in the third period to secure the come-from-behind 14–10 victory for the Whites over the Blues. The Blues scored 10 points in the first quarter on an Ed James 4-yard touchdown scamper and a field goal and extra point by Aldo Zortea. The Whites answered with a Mike Elliott 2-yard run and Frank Clark extra point for a 10–7 halftime score.

On August 22, 57 varsity and 14 freshmen Pitt football players bussed to Allegheny College in Meadville, PA for fall preseason camp on Robertson Field. The squad voted Jim Flanigan captain for the season. Coach Hart scheduled three workouts per day. Six former Panthers who were attending dental school assisted with the camp: Phil Dahar, Ron Linaberg, Rick Leeson, Barry McKnight, Pete Billey and Ed Assid. The roster was depleted as Bill Boucek (linebacker), Kurt Wentzel (tackle), Bill Myones (tackle) and Joel Klimek (end) were declared ineligible due to academic reasons. Then three days into camp, guard Tom Crosby, tight end Mark Mallinger and defensive back George Pribish were sent back to Pittsburgh for knee surgery. On September 3, the squad held their final scrimmage. The following day they returned to Pittsburgh, and trained on Trees Field until their opening game.

== Roster ==
1966 Pittsburgh Panthers football team roster
Players
Coaches
Offense

Pos.	#	Name	Class
QB(S)	17	Bob Bazylak	Jr
C	51	Andy Beamon	Jr
WB	26	Dennis Carl	So
TB	22	Dewey Chester	Sr
WB(S)	29	Joe Curtin	Jr
G	52	Tom DeMelfi	So
TB(CB)	24	Bob Dyer	Sr
QB	16	Mike Elliot	Jr
OT	70	Howard Heit	Sr
G	94	Bernard Hengsen	Jr
QB	10	Ed James	Sr
C	56	Raymond Jenkins	So
FB(CB)	42	Joe Jones	Jr
QB	92	Jay Knafelc	Sr
SE	82	Robert Longo	Jr
G	53	Ed Markovich	Jr
C	55	Merrill	Sr
OG(DE)	61	Richard Miale	Jr
QB	14	Dave Montrella	So
G	93	Al Nalli	So
WB	21	Harry Orzulak	So
FB	66	Mike Raklewicz	Jr
G	62	Dave Randour	Sr
OT	75	Dave Raudman	Jr
SE	40	Gerald Rife	Jr
TE(DE)	84	Mike Rosborough	Sr
OT	72	John Schmidt	Sr
C	59	Robert Taylor	Sr
TB	31	Bob White	So
OT(DT)	79	Ed Whittaker	So

Defense

Pos.	#	Name	Class
DE(OG)	68	Art Alois	So
G	67	Michael Coleman	Jr
S	90	William DeAscentis	So
S	19	Mickey Depp	Jr
DT	65	Dave Drake	Jr
DT	71	Greg Ellis	So
LB(FB)	44	Jim Flanigan	Sr
LB	43	Ed Gallin	So
LB	64	Dick Genter	Jr
DE	83	Frank Hartz	So
CB	25	George Hawryluk	Jr
LB	96	Terry Hoover	Jr
DE(OT)	85	Greg Keller	Jr
CB	30	Paul Killian	Jr
DE	80	Harold Littlehales	So
DT	76	Joe McCune	So
DE	77	Mark Mervos	Sr
LB(C)	50	Tom Mitrakos	Jr
CB	35	Louis Parrott	So
DT	73	Frank Pecman	Jr
S	11	Joe Pohl	Sr
DT	74	Bob Trethaway	Sr
S	86	Alan Zambo	So

Special teams

Pos.	#	Name	Class
K	32	Frank Clark	Jr
P	90	Deveon Lemster	Jr
P	99	Aldo Zortea	Sr

Head coach

- Dave Hart

Coordinators/assistant coaches

- Leeman Bennett, Steve Petro, Dick Bestwick, Frank Cignetti, Bill Lewis, Bill Neal, James Royer, Walt Cummins

Legend

- (C) Team captain
- (S) Suspended
- (I) Ineligible
- Injured
- Redshirt
