= 1966 Penn State Nittany Lions football team =

American college football season

1966 Penn State Nittany Lions football
- Conference: Independent
- Record: 5–5
- Head coach: Joe Paterno (1st season)
- Offensive scheme: I formation
- Defensive coordinator: Jim O'Hora (1st season)
- Base defense: 4–3
- Captains: Mike Irwin; John Runnells
- Home stadium: Beaver Stadium

1966 NCAA University Division independents football records
| | Conf. | | | | | Overall |
| Team | W | | L | | T | W | | L | | T |
|---|---|---|---|---|---|---|---|---|---|---|
| No. 1 Notre Dame | | – | | – | | 9 | – | 0 | – | 1 |
| Colgate | | – | | – | | 8 | – | 1 | – | 1 |
| No. 8 Georgia Tech | | – | | – | | 9 | – | 2 | – | 0 |
| Army | | – | | – | | 8 | – | 2 | – | 0 |
| Dayton | | – | | – | | 8 | – | 2 | – | 0 |
| Houston | | – | | – | | 8 | – | 2 | – | 0 |
| Memphis State | | – | | – | | 7 | – | 2 | – | 0 |
| No. 9 Miami (FL) | | – | | – | | 8 | – | 2 | – | 1 |
| Virginia Tech | | – | | – | | 8 | – | 2 | – | 1 |
| Syracuse | | – | | – | | 8 | – | 3 | – | 0 |
| Colorado State | | – | | – | | 7 | – | 3 | – | 0 |
| New Mexico State | | – | | – | | 7 | – | 3 | – | 0 |
| West Texas State | | – | | – | | 7 | – | 3 | – | 0 |
| Villanova | | – | | – | | 6 | – | 3 | – | 0 |
| Holy Cross | | – | | – | | 6 | – | 3 | – | 1 |
| Southern Miss | | – | | – | | 6 | – | 4 | – | 0 |
| Texas Western | | – | | – | | 6 | – | 4 | – | 0 |
| Tulane | | – | | – | | 5 | – | 4 | – | 1 |
| Florida State | | – | | – | | 6 | – | 5 | – | 0 |
| Buffalo | | – | | – | | 5 | – | 5 | – | 0 |
| Penn State | | – | | – | | 5 | – | 5 | – | 0 |
| Air Force | | – | | – | | 4 | – | 6 | – | 0 |
| Boston College | | – | | – | | 4 | – | 6 | – | 0 |
| Navy | | – | | – | | 4 | – | 6 | – | 0 |
| Utah State | | – | | – | | 4 | – | 6 | – | 0 |
| Xavier | | – | | – | | 4 | – | 6 | – | 0 |
| Pacific (CA) | | – | | – | | 4 | – | 7 | – | 0 |
| San Jose State | | – | | – | | 3 | – | 7 | – | 0 |
| Pittsburgh | | – | | – | | 1 | – | 9 | – | 0 |
Rankings from AP Poll

The 1966 Penn State Nittany Lions football team represented Penn State University as an independent during the 1966 NCAA University Division football season. It was Joe Paterno's first season as head coach of Penn State.

== Schedule ==
| Date | Opponent | Site | TV | Result | Attendance | Source |
|---|---|---|---|---|---|---|
| September 17 | Maryland | Beaver Stadium; University Park, PA (rivalry) | | W 15–7 | 40,911 | |
| September 24 | at No. 1 Michigan State | Spartan Stadium; East Lansing, MI (rivalry) | | L 8–42 | 64,860 | |
| October 1 | at Army | Michie Stadium; West Point, NY | | L 0–11 | 18,000 | |
| October 8 | Boston College | Beaver Stadium; University Park, PA | | W 30–21 | 30,000 | |
| October 15 | at No. 4 UCLA | Los Angeles Memorial Coliseum; Los Angeles, CA | | L 11–49 | 41,105 | |
| October 22 | at West Virginia | Mountaineer Field; Morgantown, WV (rivalry) | | W 38–6 | 15,835–30,000 | |
| October 29 | California^{†} | Beaver Stadium; University Park, PA | | W 33–15 | 37,000 | |
| November 5 | Syracuse | Beaver Stadium; University Park, PA (rivalry) | ABC regional | L 10–12 | 46,314 | |
| November 12 | at No. 5 Georgia Tech | Grant Field; Atlanta, GA | | L 0–21 | 50,172 | |
| November 19 | at Pittsburgh | Pitt Stadium; Pittsburgh, PA (rivalry) | | W 48–24 | 30,362 | |
^{†}Homecoming; Rankings from AP Poll released prior to the game

== Game summaries ==
=== Maryland ===
| Team | 1 | 2 | 3 | 4 | Total |
|---|---|---|---|---|---|
| Maryland | 7 | 0 | 0 | 0 | 7 |
| • Penn St | 11 | 0 | 0 | 4 | 15 |

- Date: September 17
- Location: Beaver Stadium, University Park, Pennsylvania
- Game attendance: 40,911

Scoring summary
| Q1 | MD | Torain 15 yard run (Bramson kick) | MD 7–0 |
| Q1 | PSU | Safety, Carlson forced out of end zone | MD 7–2 |
| Q1 | PSU | White 2 yard run (pass failed) | PSU 8–7 |
| Q1 | PSU | Sherman 23 yard field goal | PSU 11–7 |
| Q4 | PSU | Safety, Pastrana tackled in end zone | PSU 13–7 |
| Q4 | PSU | Safety, Petry illegal pass from end zone | PSU 15–7 |

== Roster ==
1966 Penn State Nittany Lions football team roster
Players
Coaches
Offense

| Pos. | # | Name | Class |
|---|---|---|---|
| OT | 73 | Dave Bradley | So |
| OT | 77 | Rich Buzin | Jr |
| WR | 23 | Bob Campbell | So |
| C | 53 | Bill Lenkaitis | So |
| QB | 25 | Tom Sherman | Jr |

Defense

| Pos. | # | Name | Class |
|---|---|---|---|
| DT | 79 | Mike McBath | Jr |

Special teams

| Pos. | # | Name | Class |

Head coach

- Joe Paterno

Coordinators/assistant coaches

- Earl Bruce
  Freshman coach/Assistant varsity coach
- Joe McMullen
  Offensive line
- Jim O'Hora
  Defensive line/Overall defense
- Frank Patrick
  Defensive backfield/Kickers
- Bob Phillips
  Offensive ends
- Dan Radakovich
  Linebackers
- George Welsh
  Offensive backfield
- J. T. White
  Defensive ends

Legend

- (C) Team captain
- (S) Suspended
- (I) Ineligible
- Injured
- Redshirt

== 1967 NFL/AFL draft ==
Three Nittany Lions were drafted in the 1967 NFL/AFL draft.

| Round | Pick | Overall | Name | Position | Team |
|---|---|---|---|---|---|
| 2nd | 27 | 53 | Dave Rowe | Defensive tackle | New Orleans Saints |
| 10th | 20 | 257 | John Runnells | Linebacker | Boston Patriots |
| 16th | 22 | 415 | Mike Irwin | Defensive back, running back | Buffalo Bills |
