= 1966 Furman Paladins football team =

American college football season

1966 Furman Paladins football
- Conference: Southern Conference
- Record: 2–7–1 (1–4 SoCon)
- Head coach: Bob King (9th season)
- Captains: David Davidson; Jimmy Kerr
- Home stadium: Sirrine Stadium

1966 Southern Conference football standings
| | Conf. | | | | | Overall |
| Team | W | | L | | T | W | | L | | T |
|---|---|---|---|---|---|---|---|---|---|---|
| East Carolina + | 4 | – | 1 | – | 1 | 4 | – | 5 | – | 1 |
| William & Mary + | 4 | – | 1 | – | 1 | 5 | – | 4 | – | 1 |
| West Virginia | 3 | – | 0 | – | 0 | 3 | – | 5 | – | 2 |
| George Washington | 4 | – | 3 | – | 0 | 4 | – | 6 | – | 0 |
| Davidson | 2 | – | 3 | – | 0 | 4 | – | 5 | – | 0 |
| The Citadel | 3 | – | 5 | – | 0 | 4 | – | 6 | – | 0 |
| Richmond | 2 | – | 4 | – | 0 | 2 | – | 8 | – | 0 |
| VMI | 1 | – | 3 | – | 0 | 2 | – | 8 | – | 0 |
| Furman | 1 | – | 4 | – | 0 | 3 | – | 7 | – | 1 |
+ – Conference co-champions

The 1966 Furman Paladins football team was an American football team that represented Furman University as a member of the Southern Conference (SoCon) during the 1966 NCAA University Division football season. In their ninth season under head coach Bob King, Furman compiled a 2–7–1 record, with a mark of 1–4 in conference play, placing ninth in the SoCon.

== Schedule ==
| Date | Opponent | Site | Result | Attendance | Source |
|---|---|---|---|---|---|
| September 17 | Parsons* | Sirrine Stadium; Greenville, SC | L 6–20 | 6,000 | |
| September 24 | at Davidson | American Legion Memorial Stadium; Charlotte, NC | W 28–26 | 8,340 | |
| October 1 | at East Carolina | Ficklen Memorial Stadium; Greenville, NC | L 0–17 | 8,235 | |
| October 8 | Wofford* | Sirrine Stadium; Greenville, SC (rivalry) | T 15–15 | 8,300 | |
| October 15 | at Tampa* | Phillips Field; Tampa, FL | L 2–41 | 9,600 | |
| October 22 | Newberry* | Sirrine Stadium; Greenville, SC | W 29–7 | 5,500 | |
| October 29 | at George Washington | District of Columbia Stadium; Washington, DC | L 28–49 | 5,900 | |
| November 5 | at Richmond | City Stadium; Richmond, VA | L 14–24 | 8,000 | |
| November 12 | Samford* | Sirrine Stadium; Greenville, SC | L 7–17 | 7,500 | |
| November 19 | The Citadel | Sirrine Stadium; Greenville, SC (rivalry) | L 6–10 | | |
*Non-conference game
