= 1966 Villanova Wildcats football team =

American college football season

1966 Villanova Wildcats football
- Conference: Independent
- Record: 6–3
- Head coach: Alexander F. Bell (7th season)
- Captain: John Fry
- Home stadium: Villanova Stadium

1966 NCAA University Division independents football records
	Conf.					Overall
Team	W		L		T	W		L		T
No. 1 Notre Dame		–		–		9	–	0	–	1
Colgate		–		–		8	–	1	–	1
No. 8 Georgia Tech		–		–		9	–	2	–	0
Army		–		–		8	–	2	–	0
Dayton		–		–		8	–	2	–	0
Houston		–		–		8	–	2	–	0
Memphis State		–		–		7	–	2	–	0
No. 9 Miami (FL)		–		–		8	–	2	–	1
Virginia Tech		–		–		8	–	2	–	1
Syracuse		–		–		8	–	3	–	0
Colorado State		–		–		7	–	3	–	0
New Mexico State		–		–		7	–	3	–	0
West Texas State		–		–		7	–	3	–	0
Villanova		–		–		6	–	3	–	0
Holy Cross		–		–		6	–	3	–	1
Southern Miss		–		–		6	–	4	–	0
Texas Western		–		–		6	–	4	–	0
Tulane		–		–		5	–	4	–	1
Florida State		–		–		6	–	5	–	0
Buffalo		–		–		5	–	5	–	0
Penn State		–		–		5	–	5	–	0
Air Force		–		–		4	–	6	–	0
Boston College		–		–		4	–	6	–	0
Navy		–		–		4	–	6	–	0
Utah State		–		–		4	–	6	–	0
Xavier		–		–		4	–	6	–	0
Pacific (CA)		–		–		4	–	7	–	0
San Jose State		–		–		3	–	7	–	0
Pittsburgh		–		–		1	–	9	–	0
Rankings from AP Poll

The 1966 Villanova Wildcats football team represented the Villanova University during the 1966 NCAA University Division football season. The head coach was Alexander F. Bell, coaching his seventh season with the Wildcats. The team played their home games at Villanova Stadium in Villanova, Pennsylvania.

== Schedule ==
Date	Opponent	Site	Result	Attendance	Source
September 17	VMI	Villanova Stadium; Villanova, PA	L 13–14	8,300	
September 24	Toledo	Villanova Stadium; Villanova, PA	W 20–11	7,007	
October 1	at Buffalo	Rotary Field; Buffalo, NY	L 8–28	9,153	
October 8	at William & Mary	Cary Field; Williamsburg, VA	L 14–34	8,500–9,000	
October 15	No. 10 Delaware	Villanova Stadium; Villanova, PA (rivalry)	W 16–14	11,975	
October 22	West Chester	Villanova Stadium; Villanova, PA	W 15–0	8,912	
October 29	Xavier	Villanova Stadium; Villanova, PA	W 13–7	10,011	
November 12	Boston College	Villanova Stadium; Villanova, PA	W 19–0	11,068	
November 24	at George Washington	District of Columbia Stadium; Washington, DC	W 16–7	6,800	
Rankings from UPI Coaches Poll released prior to the game
