= 1966 Richmond Spiders football team =

American college football season

1966 Richmond Spiders football
- Conference: Southern Conference
- Record: 2–8 (2–4 SoCon)
- Head coach: Frank Jones (1st season)
- Captains: Larry Zunich; Larry Pew
- Home stadium: City Stadium

1966 Southern Conference football standings
	Conf.					Overall
Team	W		L		T	W		L		T
East Carolina +	4	–	1	–	1	4	–	5	–	1
William & Mary +	4	–	1	–	1	5	–	4	–	1
West Virginia	3	–	0	–	0	3	–	5	–	2
George Washington	4	–	3	–	0	4	–	6	–	0
Davidson	2	–	3	–	0	4	–	5	–	0
The Citadel	3	–	5	–	0	4	–	6	–	0
Richmond	2	–	4	–	0	2	–	8	–	0
VMI	1	–	3	–	0	2	–	8	–	0
Furman	1	–	4	–	0	3	–	7	–	1
+ – Conference co-champions

The 1966 Richmond Spiders football team was an American football team that represented the University of Richmond as a member of the Southern Conference (SoCon) during the 1966 NCAA University Division football season. In their first season under head coach Frank Jones, Richmond compiled a 2–8 record, with a mark of 2–4 in conference play, finishing in seventh place in the SoCon.

== Schedule ==
Date	Opponent	Site	Result	Attendance	Source
September 17	at Dayton*	Baujan Field; Dayton, OH	L 0–23		
September 24	at The Citadel	Johnson Hagood Stadium; Charleston, SC	L 6–24	10,948	
October 1	at Mississippi State*	Scott Field; Starkville, MS	L 0–20	14,000	
October 7	VMI	City Stadium; Richmond, VA (rivalry)	L 20–34	11,000	
October 15	at West Texas State*	Buffalo Bowl; Canyon, TX	L 7–41	14,500	
October 22	Davidson	City Stadium; Richmond, VA	W 23–17	7,000	
October 29	at Southern Miss*	Faulkner Field; Hattiesburg, MS	L 0–27	8,600	
November 5	Furman	City Stadium; Richmond, VA	W 24–14	8,000	
November 12	at East Carolina	Ficklen Memorial Stadium; Greenville, NC	L 16–28	8,212	
November 19	William & Mary	City Stadium; Richmond, VA (rivalry)	L 19–35	5,000	
*Non-conference game
