= 1966 East Carolina Pirates football team =

American college football season

1966 East Carolina Pirates football
- Conference: Southern Conference
- Record: 4–5–1 (4–1–1 SoCon)
- Head coach: Clarence Stasavich (5th season)
- Home stadium: Ficklen Memorial Stadium

1966 Southern Conference football standings
	Conf.					Overall
Team	W		L		T	W		L		T
East Carolina +	4	–	1	–	1	4	–	5	–	1
William & Mary +	4	–	1	–	1	5	–	4	–	1
West Virginia	3	–	0	–	0	3	–	5	–	2
George Washington	4	–	3	–	0	4	–	6	–	0
Davidson	2	–	3	–	0	4	–	5	–	0
The Citadel	3	–	5	–	0	4	–	6	–	0
Richmond	2	–	4	–	0	2	–	8	–	0
VMI	1	–	3	–	0	2	–	8	–	0
Furman	1	–	4	–	0	3	–	7	–	1
+ – Conference co-champions

The 1966 East Carolina Pirates football team was an American football team that represented East Carolina College (now known as East Carolina University) as a member of the Southern Conference during the 1966 NCAA University Division football season. In their fifth season under head coach Clarence Stasavich, the team compiled a 4–5–1 record.

== Schedule ==
Date	Opponent	Site	Result	Attendance	Source
September 17	at William & Mary	Cary Field; Williamsburg, VA	T 7–7	10,000	
September 24	Northeast Louisiana State*	Ficklen Memorial Stadium; Greenville, NC	L 14–21	14,000	
October 1	Furman	Ficklen Memorial Stadium; Greenville, NC	W 17–0	8,235	
October 8	Davidson	Ficklen Memorial Stadium; Greenville, NC	W 40–7	16,903	
October 15	at George Washington	District of Columbia Stadium; Washington, DC	L 7–20	7,200	
October 22	at The Citadel	Johnson Hagood Stadium; Charleston, SC	W 27–17	10,400	
October 29	at Southern Illinois*	McAndrew Stadium; Carbondale, IL	L 13–31	14,000	
November 12	Richmond	Ficklen Memorial Stadium; Greenville, NC	W 28–16	8,212	
November 19	Southern Miss*	Ficklen Memorial Stadium; Greenville, NC	L 14–35	12,811	
November 25	at Louisville*	Fairgrounds Stadium; Louisville, KY	L 7–21	3,500–4,500	
*Non-conference game
