= 1966 Syracuse Orangemen football team =

American college football season

1966 Syracuse Orangemen football

Eastern champion

Gator Bowl, L 12–18 vs. Tennessee
- Conference: Independent

Ranking
- Coaches: No. 16
- Record: 8–3
- Head coach: Ben Schwartzwalder (18th season)
- Captains: Floyd Little; Herb Stecker
- Home stadium: Archbold Stadium

1966 NCAA University Division independents football records
	Conf.					Overall
Team	W		L		T	W		L		T
No. 1 Notre Dame		–		–		9	–	0	–	1
Colgate		–		–		8	–	1	–	1
No. 8 Georgia Tech		–		–		9	–	2	–	0
Army		–		–		8	–	2	–	0
Dayton		–		–		8	–	2	–	0
Houston		–		–		8	–	2	–	0
Memphis State		–		–		7	–	2	–	0
No. 9 Miami (FL)		–		–		8	–	2	–	1
Virginia Tech		–		–		8	–	2	–	1
Syracuse		–		–		8	–	3	–	0
Colorado State		–		–		7	–	3	–	0
New Mexico State		–		–		7	–	3	–	0
West Texas State		–		–		7	–	3	–	0
Villanova		–		–		6	–	3	–	0
Holy Cross		–		–		6	–	3	–	1
Southern Miss		–		–		6	–	4	–	0
Texas Western		–		–		6	–	4	–	0
Tulane		–		–		5	–	4	–	1
Florida State		–		–		6	–	5	–	0
Buffalo		–		–		5	–	5	–	0
Penn State		–		–		5	–	5	–	0
Air Force		–		–		4	–	6	–	0
Boston College		–		–		4	–	6	–	0
Navy		–		–		4	–	6	–	0
Utah State		–		–		4	–	6	–	0
Xavier		–		–		4	–	6	–	0
Pacific (CA)		–		–		4	–	7	–	0
San Jose State		–		–		3	–	7	–	0
Pittsburgh		–		–		1	–	9	–	0
Rankings from AP Poll

The 1966 Syracuse Orangemen football team represented Syracuse University as an independent during the 1966 NCAA University Division football season. The Orangemen were led by 18th-year head coach Ben Schwartzwalder and played their home games at Archbold Stadium in Syracuse, New York. After losing their first two games of the season, Syracuse won the next eight games, finishing the regular season with a record of 8–2 and ranked 16th in the Coaches Poll. They were invited to the 1966 Gator Bowl, where they lost to Tennessee.

== Schedule ==
Date	Opponent	Rank	Site	Result	Attendance	Source
September 10	at Baylor	No. 7	Baylor Stadium; Waco, TX	L 12–35	31,000	
September 24	No. 2 UCLA		Archbold Stadium; Syracuse, NY	L 12–31	35,000	
October 1	Maryland		Archbold Stadium; Syracuse, NY	W 28–7	24,000	
October 8	Navy		Archbold Stadium; Syracuse, NY	W 28–14	39,000	
October 15	at Boston College		Alumni Stadium; Chestnut Hill, MA	W 30–0	24,500	
October 22	at Holy Cross		Fitton Field; Worcester, MA	W 28–6	19,000	
October 29	Pittsburgh		Archbold Stadium; Syracuse, NY (rivalry)	W 33–7	30,000	
November 5	at Penn State		Beaver Stadium; University Park, PA (rivalry)	W 12–10	46,314	
November 12	Florida State		Archbold Stadium; Syracuse, NY	W 37–21	35,405	
November 19	at West Virginia		Mountaineer Field; Morgantown, WV (rivalry)	W 34–7	19,000	
December 31	vs. Tennessee		Gator Bowl Stadium; Jacksonville, FL (Gator Bowl)	L 12–18	60,213	
Rankings from AP Poll released prior to the game
