= 1966 Virginia Tech Gobblers football team =

American college football season

1966 Virginia Tech Gobblers football

Liberty Bowl, L 7–14 vs. Miami (FL)
- Conference: Independent

Ranking
- Coaches: No. 20
- Record: 8–2–1
- Head coach: Jerry Claiborne (6th season)
- Home stadium: Lane Stadium

1966 NCAA University Division independents football records
	Conf.					Overall
Team	W		L		T	W		L		T
No. 1 Notre Dame		–		–		9	–	0	–	1
Colgate		–		–		8	–	1	–	1
No. 8 Georgia Tech		–		–		9	–	2	–	0
Army		–		–		8	–	2	–	0
Dayton		–		–		8	–	2	–	0
Houston		–		–		8	–	2	–	0
Memphis State		–		–		7	–	2	–	0
No. 9 Miami (FL)		–		–		8	–	2	–	1
Virginia Tech		–		–		8	–	2	–	1
Syracuse		–		–		8	–	3	–	0
Colorado State		–		–		7	–	3	–	0
New Mexico State		–		–		7	–	3	–	0
West Texas State		–		–		7	–	3	–	0
Villanova		–		–		6	–	3	–	0
Holy Cross		–		–		6	–	3	–	1
Southern Miss		–		–		6	–	4	–	0
Texas Western		–		–		6	–	4	–	0
Tulane		–		–		5	–	4	–	1
Florida State		–		–		6	–	5	–	0
Buffalo		–		–		5	–	5	–	0
Penn State		–		–		5	–	5	–	0
Air Force		–		–		4	–	6	–	0
Boston College		–		–		4	–	6	–	0
Navy		–		–		4	–	6	–	0
Utah State		–		–		4	–	6	–	0
Xavier		–		–		4	–	6	–	0
Pacific (CA)		–		–		4	–	7	–	0
San Jose State		–		–		3	–	7	–	0
Pittsburgh		–		–		1	–	9	–	0
Rankings from AP Poll

The 1966 Virginia Tech Gobblers football team represented the Virginia Polytechnic Institute or VPI (now known as Virginia Polytechnic Institute and State University or Virginia Tech) as an independent during the 1966 NCAA University Division football season. Led by sixth-year head coach Jerry Claiborne the Gobblers compiled an overall record of 8–2–1 and were defeated by Miami (FL) in the Liberty Bowl. VPI played home games at Lane Stadium in Blacksburg, Virginia.

== Schedule ==
Date	Time	Opponent	Site	TV	Result	Attendance	Source
September 17		at Tulane	Tulane Stadium; New Orleans, LA		L 0–13	22,500	
September 24		George Washington	Lane Stadium; Blacksburg, VA		W 49–0	18,000	
October 1		West Virginia	Lane Stadium; Blacksburg, VA (rivalry)		T 13–13	25,000	
October 8		at Kentucky	McLean Stadium; Lexington, KY		W 7–0	31,000	
October 15		vs. Vanderbilt	City Stadium; Richmond, VA (Tobacco Bowl)		W 21–6	22,000	
October 22		at Virginia	Scott Stadium; Charlottesville, VA (rivalry)		W 24–7	29,000	
October 29		Florida State^{†}	Lane Stadium; Blacksburg, VA	ABC	W 23–21	31,000	
November 5		at Wake Forest	Bowman Gray Stadium; Winston-Salem, NC		W 11–0	9,000	
November 12		at William & Mary	Cary Field; Williamsburg, VA		W 20–18	13,000	
November 24		vs. VMI	Victory Stadium; Roanoke, VA (rivalry)		W 70–12	21,000	
December 10	12:15 p.m.	vs. No. 9 Miami (FL)	Memphis Memorial Stadium; Memphis, TN (Liberty Bowl, rivalry)	ABC	L 7–14	25,012	
^{†}Homecoming; Rankings from AP Poll released prior to the game

== Roster ==
The following players were members of the 1966 football team according to the roster published in the 1967 edition of The Bugle, the Virginia Tech yearbook.

VPI 1966 roster
Art Aguilar; S. Backs; Ken Barefoot; Eddie Barker; Frank Beamer; Judson Bigelow; Andy Bowling; Jud Brownell; Donnie Bruce; Eddie Bulheller; James Edward "Eddie" Carter; Paul Frederick Cobb; Chris Frank Collis; George Constantinides; J. Dee Crigger; Clarence Culpepper; Daniel Cupp; Ron Davidson; Scott Dawson; Damon William Dedo; Steve Divita; Daniel W. Etzold; David Lowell Farmer	Rusty Fife; Gene Fisher; Chester Arthur Forrester; George Foussekis; Tommy Francisco; Doug Gainous; Sal Garcia; Ted Georges; Jerry Green; Bob Griffith; Tommy Groom; Waddey Harvey; Jeff Haynes; Bert Henderson; Erick Johnson; Al Kincaid; Karsten Koepcke; Frank Leonard; Ronnie Lindon; Dickie Longerbeam; Frank Loria; Leonard Angelo Luongo; Fred Magarian	John Lawrence Maxwell; Ronald Lee McGuigan; Milton E. Miller; Richard Mollo; Dan Mooney; Frederick Marshall Mooney; Carl Edward Omohundro; Thomas Irwin Parks; Rick Piland; John Raible; James John Reba; Jim Richards; John Schrecker; Dennis Michael Semones; Tommy Stafford; Tom Swords; Don Thacker; John Randolph Treadwell; Jonathan Titley Utin; Ken Whitley; Sands Woody; Pete Wrenn; Carl Yaras
