= 1966 Houston Cougars football team =

American college football season

1966 Houston Cougars football
- Conference: Independent

Ranking
- Coaches: No. 17
- Record: 8–2
- Head coach: Bill Yeoman (5th season)
- Defensive coordinator: Melvin Robertson (2nd season)
- Captain: Dickie Post
- Home stadium: Astrodome

1966 NCAA University Division independents football records
	Conf.					Overall
Team	W		L		T	W		L		T
No. 1 Notre Dame		–		–		9	–	0	–	1
Colgate		–		–		8	–	1	–	1
No. 8 Georgia Tech		–		–		9	–	2	–	0
Army		–		–		8	–	2	–	0
Dayton		–		–		8	–	2	–	0
Houston		–		–		8	–	2	–	0
Memphis State		–		–		7	–	2	–	0
No. 9 Miami (FL)		–		–		8	–	2	–	1
Virginia Tech		–		–		8	–	2	–	1
Syracuse		–		–		8	–	3	–	0
Colorado State		–		–		7	–	3	–	0
New Mexico State		–		–		7	–	3	–	0
West Texas State		–		–		7	–	3	–	0
Villanova		–		–		6	–	3	–	0
Holy Cross		–		–		6	–	3	–	1
Southern Miss		–		–		6	–	4	–	0
Texas Western		–		–		6	–	4	–	0
Tulane		–		–		5	–	4	–	1
Florida State		–		–		6	–	5	–	0
Buffalo		–		–		5	–	5	–	0
Penn State		–		–		5	–	5	–	0
Air Force		–		–		4	–	6	–	0
Boston College		–		–		4	–	6	–	0
Navy		–		–		4	–	6	–	0
Utah State		–		–		4	–	6	–	0
Xavier		–		–		4	–	6	–	0
Pacific (CA)		–		–		4	–	7	–	0
San Jose State		–		–		3	–	7	–	0
Pittsburgh		–		–		1	–	9	–	0
Rankings from AP Poll

The 1966 Houston Cougars football team was an American football team that represented the University of Houston as an independent during the 1966 NCAA University Division football season. In its fifth season under head coach Bill Yeoman, the team compiled an 8–2 record, outscored opponents by a total of 335 to 125, and was ranked No. 17 in the final UPI/Coaches Poll. The team led the NCAA in total offense with an average of 437.2 yards per game.

Halfback Dickie Post was the team captain, led the team with 1,061 rushing yards, and was also selected by the Houston Chronicle as the Player of the Year. Other statistical leaders included quarterback Bo Burris with 1,666 passing yards and split end Ken Hebert with 38 receptions, 800 receiving yards, and 113 points scored (11 touchdowns, 41 extra points, and two field goals). Hebert's 113 points led all major college football players in 1966.

The team played its home games at the Astrodome in Houston. The attendance at seven home games totaled 287,530, an average of 41,076 per game.

== Schedule ==
Date	Opponent	Site	Result	Attendance	Source
September 17	at Florida State	Doak Campbell Stadium; Tallahassee, FL	W 21–13	35,643	
September 23	Washington State	Astrodome; Houston, TX	W 21–7	36,104	
October 1	Oklahoma State	Astrodome; Houston, TX	W 35–9	43,743	
October 15	Mississippi State	Astrodome; Houston, TX	W 28–0	47,870	
October 22	vs. Ole Miss	Memphis Memorial Stadium; Memphis, TN	L 6–27	14,118	
October 29	Tampa	Astrodome; Houston, TX	W 48–9	41,182	
November 5	Tulsa^{†}	Astrodome; Houston, TX	W 73–14	42,061	
November 12	at Kentucky	McLean Stadium; Lexington, KY	W 56–18	32,000	
November 26	Memphis State	Astrodome; Houston, TX	L 13–14	41,313	
December 3	Utah	Astrodome; Houston, TX	W 34–14	35,257	
^{†}Homecoming

== Records ==
Houston players set multiple single-season school records during the 1966 season, including the following:

- Burris set school records with 22 touchdown passes and also with 21 interceptions thrown.
- Hebert set school records with 113 points scored and 11 touchdown receptions. He also punted for an average of 41.33 yards on 40 punts.
- Don Bean set school records with 384 punt return yards (on 19 returns) and also with three punt returns for touchdowns.
- Running back Warren McVea set a school record with an average of 8.8 rushing yards per carry.

The team also set single-game scoring and total offense records with 73 points and 585 yards against Tulsa on November 5.

== Roster ==
- Tom Beer, tight end
- Royce Berry, defensive end
- Greg Brezina, linebacker
- Bo Burris, quarterback
- George Caraway, defensive line
- Bill Cloud, offensive tackle
- Carl Cunningham, defensive end/linebacker
- Jim Dyar, defensive line
- Charlie Fowler, offensive line
- Jerry Gardner, linebacker
- Dick George, defensive line
- Ken Hebert, split end
- Gus Hollomon, defensive back
- Warren McVea, running back
- George Nordgren, running back
- Paul Otis, defensive line
- Tom Paciorek, defensive back
- Johnny Peacock, defensive back
- Wade Phillips, linebacker
- Bill Pickens, offensive guard
- Dickie Post, running back
- Barry Sides, offensive line
- Mike Simpson, defensive back
- Dick Spratt, defensive back
- Skippy Spruill, linebacker
- Rich Stotter, offensive guard

== Professional football ==
Several players from the 1966 Houston team later played in the NFL or AFL: Tom Beer, Bo Burris, Carl Cunningham, Paul Gipson, Ken Hebert, Greg Brezina, Charlie Hall, Gus Hollomon, Royce Berry, Warren McVea, and Dickie Post. In addition, Tom Paciorek, who intercepted six passes in 1966, went on to play 18 years in Major League Baseball.
