= 1966 Memphis State Tigers football team =

American college football season

1966 Memphis State Tigers football
- Conference: Independent
- Record: 7–2
- Head coach: Billy J. Murphy (9th season)
- Home stadium: Memphis Memorial Stadium

1966 NCAA University Division independents football records
	Conf.					Overall
Team	W		L		T	W		L		T
No. 1 Notre Dame		–		–		9	–	0	–	1
Colgate		–		–		8	–	1	–	1
No. 8 Georgia Tech		–		–		9	–	2	–	0
Army		–		–		8	–	2	–	0
Dayton		–		–		8	–	2	–	0
Houston		–		–		8	–	2	–	0
Memphis State		–		–		7	–	2	–	0
No. 9 Miami (FL)		–		–		8	–	2	–	1
Virginia Tech		–		–		8	–	2	–	1
Syracuse		–		–		8	–	3	–	0
Colorado State		–		–		7	–	3	–	0
New Mexico State		–		–		7	–	3	–	0
West Texas State		–		–		7	–	3	–	0
Villanova		–		–		6	–	3	–	0
Holy Cross		–		–		6	–	3	–	1
Southern Miss		–		–		6	–	4	–	0
Texas Western		–		–		6	–	4	–	0
Tulane		–		–		5	–	4	–	1
Florida State		–		–		6	–	5	–	0
Buffalo		–		–		5	–	5	–	0
Penn State		–		–		5	–	5	–	0
Air Force		–		–		4	–	6	–	0
Boston College		–		–		4	–	6	–	0
Navy		–		–		4	–	6	–	0
Utah State		–		–		4	–	6	–	0
Xavier		–		–		4	–	6	–	0
Pacific (CA)		–		–		4	–	7	–	0
San Jose State		–		–		3	–	7	–	0
Pittsburgh		–		–		1	–	9	–	0
Rankings from AP Poll

The 1966 Memphis State Tigers football team represented Memphis State College (now known as the University of Memphis) as an independent during the 1966 NCAA University Division football season. In its ninth season under head coach Billy J. Murphy, the team compiled a 7–2 record and outscored opponents by a total of 121 to 96. The team played its home games at Memphis Memorial Stadium in Memphis, Tennessee.

The team's statistical leaders included Terry Padgett with 348 passing yards, Terry Padgett with 539 rushing yards, Dale Brady with 176 receiving yards, and Tom Wallace with 36 points scored.

== Schedule ==
Date	Opponent	Site	Result	Attendance	Source
September 17	Ole Miss	Memphis Memorial Stadium; Memphis, TN (rivalry)	L 0–13	50,164	
September 24	at South Carolina	Carolina Stadium; Columbia, SC	W 16–7	24,404	
October 1	Southern Miss	Memphis Memorial Stadium; Memphis, TN	W 6–0	21,213	
October 15	Quantico Marines	Memphis Memorial Stadium; Memphis, TN	W 20–14	19,190	
October 22	Tulsa^{†}	Memphis Memorial Stadium; Memphis, TN	W 6–0	27,604	
October 29	at West Texas State	Buffalo Bowl; Canyon, TX	W 26–14	12,500	
November 12	at Wake Forest	Bowman Gray Stadium; Winston-Salem, NC	L 7–21	8,000	
November 19	Cincinnati	Memphis Memorial Stadium; Memphis, TN (rivalry)	W 26–14	13,357	
November 26	at Houston	Houston Astrodome; Houston, TX	W 14–13	41,313	
^{†}Homecoming
