= 1966 Miami Hurricanes football team =

American college football season

1966 Miami Hurricanes football

Liberty Bowl, W 14–7 vs. Virginia Tech
- Conference: Independent

Ranking
- Coaches: No. 10
- AP: No. 9
- Record: 8–2–1
- Head coach: Charlie Tate (3rd season)
- MVP: Tom Beier
- Home stadium: Miami Orange Bowl

1966 NCAA University Division independents football records
| | Conf. | | | | | Overall |
| Team | W | | L | | T | W | | L | | T |
|---|---|---|---|---|---|---|---|---|---|---|
| No. 1 Notre Dame | | – | | – | | 9 | – | 0 | – | 1 |
| Colgate | | – | | – | | 8 | – | 1 | – | 1 |
| No. 8 Georgia Tech | | – | | – | | 9 | – | 2 | – | 0 |
| Army | | – | | – | | 8 | – | 2 | – | 0 |
| Dayton | | – | | – | | 8 | – | 2 | – | 0 |
| Houston | | – | | – | | 8 | – | 2 | – | 0 |
| Memphis State | | – | | – | | 7 | – | 2 | – | 0 |
| No. 9 Miami (FL) | | – | | – | | 8 | – | 2 | – | 1 |
| Virginia Tech | | – | | – | | 8 | – | 2 | – | 1 |
| Syracuse | | – | | – | | 8 | – | 3 | – | 0 |
| Colorado State | | – | | – | | 7 | – | 3 | – | 0 |
| New Mexico State | | – | | – | | 7 | – | 3 | – | 0 |
| West Texas State | | – | | – | | 7 | – | 3 | – | 0 |
| Villanova | | – | | – | | 6 | – | 3 | – | 0 |
| Holy Cross | | – | | – | | 6 | – | 3 | – | 1 |
| Southern Miss | | – | | – | | 6 | – | 4 | – | 0 |
| Texas Western | | – | | – | | 6 | – | 4 | – | 0 |
| Tulane | | – | | – | | 5 | – | 4 | – | 1 |
| Florida State | | – | | – | | 6 | – | 5 | – | 0 |
| Buffalo | | – | | – | | 5 | – | 5 | – | 0 |
| Penn State | | – | | – | | 5 | – | 5 | – | 0 |
| Air Force | | – | | – | | 4 | – | 6 | – | 0 |
| Boston College | | – | | – | | 4 | – | 6 | – | 0 |
| Navy | | – | | – | | 4 | – | 6 | – | 0 |
| Utah State | | – | | – | | 4 | – | 6 | – | 0 |
| Xavier | | – | | – | | 4 | – | 6 | – | 0 |
| Pacific (CA) | | – | | – | | 4 | – | 7 | – | 0 |
| San Jose State | | – | | – | | 3 | – | 7 | – | 0 |
| Pittsburgh | | – | | – | | 1 | – | 9 | – | 0 |
Rankings from AP Poll

The 1966 Miami Hurricanes football team represented the University of Miami as an independent during the 1966 NCAA University Division football season. Led by third-year head coach Charlie Tate, the Hurricanes played their home games at the Miami Orange Bowl in Miami, Florida. Miami finished the season with a record of 8–2–1 and a victory in the Liberty Bowl over Virginia Tech.

== Schedule ==
| Date | Opponent | Rank | Site | Result | Attendance | Source |
|---|---|---|---|---|---|---|
| September 17 | at Colorado | | Folsom Field; Boulder, CO | W 24–3 | 39,000 | |
| September 24 | Florida State | | Miami Orange Bowl; Miami, FL (rivalry) | L 20–23 | 54,262 | |
| October 1 | at LSU | | Tiger Stadium; Baton Rouge, LA | L 8–10 | 67,500 | |
| October 14 | Georgia | | Miami Orange Bowl; Miami, FL | W 7–6 | 41,756 | |
| October 21 | Indiana | | Miami Orange Bowl; Miami, FL | W 14–7 | 19,627 | |
| October 28 | No. 5 USC | | Miami Orange Bowl; Miami, FL | W 10–7 | 51,156 | |
| November 5 | at Tulane | | Tulane Stadium; New Orleans, LA | T 10–10 | 40,000 | |
| November 11 | Pittsburgh | | Miami Orange Bowl; Miami, FL | W 38–14 | 35,035 | |
| November 18 | Iowa | | Miami Orange Bowl; Miami, FL | W 44–0 | 35,003 | |
| November 26 | at No. 9 Florida | | Florida Field; Gainesville, FL (rivalry) | W 21–16 | 59,211 | |
| December 10 | vs. Virginia Tech | No. 9 | Memphis Memorial Stadium; Memphis, TN (Liberty Bowl) | W 14–7 | 25,012 | |
Rankings from AP Poll released prior to the game

== Game summaries ==
=== At Florida ===
Miami (FL) at Florida

| Team | 1 | 2 | 3 | 4 | Total |
|---|---|---|---|---|---|
| • Hurricanes | 0 | 14 | 7 | 0 | 21 |
| No. 9 Gators | 0 | 3 | 6 | 7 | 16 |

- Date: November 26
- Location: Florida Field
- Game attendance: 59,211

Scoring summary
| Q2 | MIA | McGee ? yard run (Harris kick) | MIA 7–0 |
| Q2 | FLA | Barfield 23 yard field goal | MIA 7–3 |
| Q2 | MIA | Smith 10 yard pass from Miller (Harris kick) | MIA 14–3 |
| Q3 | MIA | Miller 40 yard run (Harris kick) | MIA 21–3 |
| Q3 | FLA | Ewaldsen 6 yard pass from Spurrier (pass failed) | MIA 21–9 |
| Q4 | FLA | Smith 30 yard run (Barfield kick) | MIA 21–16 |

== Roster ==
- Ted Hendricks, So.

== Team players drafted into the NFL ==
| Player | Position | Round | Pick | NFL club |
| Gene Trosch | Defensive end | 1 | 24 | Kansas City Chiefs |
| Mike Haggerty | Tackle | 6 | 140 | Pittsburgh Steelers |
