= 1966 Pacific Tigers football team =

American college football season

1966 Pacific Tigers football
- Conference: Independent
- Record: 4–7
- Head coach: Doug Scovil (1st season)
- Home stadium: Pacific Memorial Stadium

1966 NCAA University Division independents football records
	Conf.					Overall
Team	W		L		T	W		L		T
No. 1 Notre Dame		–		–		9	–	0	–	1
Colgate		–		–		8	–	1	–	1
No. 8 Georgia Tech		–		–		9	–	2	–	0
Army		–		–		8	–	2	–	0
Dayton		–		–		8	–	2	–	0
Houston		–		–		8	–	2	–	0
Memphis State		–		–		7	–	2	–	0
No. 9 Miami (FL)		–		–		8	–	2	–	1
Virginia Tech		–		–		8	–	2	–	1
Syracuse		–		–		8	–	3	–	0
Colorado State		–		–		7	–	3	–	0
New Mexico State		–		–		7	–	3	–	0
West Texas State		–		–		7	–	3	–	0
Villanova		–		–		6	–	3	–	0
Holy Cross		–		–		6	–	3	–	1
Southern Miss		–		–		6	–	4	–	0
Texas Western		–		–		6	–	4	–	0
Tulane		–		–		5	–	4	–	1
Florida State		–		–		6	–	5	–	0
Buffalo		–		–		5	–	5	–	0
Penn State		–		–		5	–	5	–	0
Air Force		–		–		4	–	6	–	0
Boston College		–		–		4	–	6	–	0
Navy		–		–		4	–	6	–	0
Utah State		–		–		4	–	6	–	0
Xavier		–		–		4	–	6	–	0
Pacific (CA)		–		–		4	–	7	–	0
San Jose State		–		–		3	–	7	–	0
Pittsburgh		–		–		1	–	9	–	0
Rankings from AP Poll

The 1966 Pacific Tigers football team represented the University of the Pacific (UOP) as an independent during the 1966 NCAA University Division football season. Led by first-year head coach Doug Scovil, the Tigers compiled a record of 4–7 and were outscored by opponents 303 to 211. The team played home games at Pacific Memorial Stadium in Stockton, California.

While not a winning record, the 1966 season was an improvement. The four wins were as many as the Tigers had the previous three seasons combined.

== Schedule ==
Date	Opponent	Site	Result	Attendance	Source
September 17	Cal State Los Angeles	Pacific Memorial Stadium; Stockton, CA	W 30–7	10,000–16,000	
September 24	West Texas State	Pacific Memorial Stadium; Stockton, CA	L 7–49	16,033	
October 1	at Idaho	Neale Stadium; Moscow, ID	L 7–28	6,700–12,500	
October 8	at New Mexico State	Memorial Stadium; Las Cruces, NM	L 23–49	14,000	
October 15	Montana	Pacific Memorial Stadium; Stockton, CA	W 28–0	11,500	
October 22	at Hawaii	Honolulu Stadium; Honolulu, HI	W 41–0	7,000	
October 29	San Jose State	Pacific Memorial Stadium; Stockton, CA (Victory Bell)	W 38–35	18,000	
November 5	Utah State	Pacific Memorial Stadium; Stockton, CA	L 9–47	11,000–12,000	
November 12	at Fresno State	Ratcliffe Stadium; Fresno, CA	L 14–16	8,429–9,500	
November 18	at Long Beach State	Veterans Memorial Stadium; Long Beach, CA	L 14–34	6,000	
November 26	at BYU	Cougar Stadium; Provo, UT	L 0–38	14,845	
