= 1966 VMI Keydets football team =

American college football season

1966 VMI Keydets football
- Conference: Southern Conference
- Record: 2–8 (1–3 SoCon)
- Head coach: Vito Ragazzo (1st season)
- Home stadium: Alumni Memorial Field

1966 Southern Conference football standings
	Conf.					Overall
Team	W		L		T	W		L		T
East Carolina +	4	–	1	–	1	4	–	5	–	1
William & Mary +	4	–	1	–	1	5	–	4	–	1
West Virginia	3	–	0	–	0	3	–	5	–	2
George Washington	4	–	3	–	0	4	–	6	–	0
Davidson	2	–	3	–	0	4	–	5	–	0
The Citadel	3	–	5	–	0	4	–	6	–	0
Richmond	2	–	4	–	0	2	–	8	–	0
VMI	1	–	3	–	0	2	–	8	–	0
Furman	1	–	4	–	0	3	–	7	–	1
+ – Conference co-champions

The 1966 VMI Keydets football team was an American football team that represented the Virginia Military Institute (VMI) as a member of the Southern Conference (SoCon) during the 1966 NCAA University Division football season. In their first year under head coach Vito Ragazzo, the team compiled an overall record of 2–8 with a mark of 1–3 in conference play, placing eighth in the SoCon.

== Schedule ==
Date	Opponent	Site	Result	Attendance	Source
September 17	at Villanova*	Villanova Stadium; Villanova, PA	W 14–13	8,300	
September 24	vs. Georgia*	Victory Stadium; Roanoke, VA (Harvest Bowl)	L 7–43	15,000	
October 1	at Boston College*	Alumni Stadium; Chestnut Hill, MA	L 0–14	10,500	
October 7	at Richmond	City Stadium; Richmond, VA (rivalry)	W 34–20	11,000	
October 15	at Virginia*	Scott Stadium; Charlottesville, VA	L 27–38	18,000	
October 22	George Washington	Alumni Memorial Field; Lexington, VA	L 0–13	4,500	
October 29	William & Mary	Alumni Memorial Field; Lexington, VA (rivalry)	L 15–22	7,000	
November 5	at Southern Miss*	Faulkner Field; Hattiesburg, MS	L 6–42	13,000	
November 12	at The Citadel	Johnson Hagood Stadium; Charleston, SC (rivalry)	L 14–30		
November 24	vs. Virginia Tech*	Victory Stadium; Roanoke, VA (rivalry)	L 12–70	21,000	
*Non-conference game
