= 1966 Colorado State Rams football team =

American college football season

1966 Colorado State Rams football
- Conference: Independent
- Record: 7–3
- Head coach: Mike Lude (5th season)
- Home stadium: Colorado Field

1966 NCAA University Division independents football records
	Conf.					Overall
Team	W		L		T	W		L		T
No. 1 Notre Dame		–		–		9	–	0	–	1
Colgate		–		–		8	–	1	–	1
No. 8 Georgia Tech		–		–		9	–	2	–	0
Army		–		–		8	–	2	–	0
Dayton		–		–		8	–	2	–	0
Houston		–		–		8	–	2	–	0
Memphis State		–		–		7	–	2	–	0
No. 9 Miami (FL)		–		–		8	–	2	–	1
Virginia Tech		–		–		8	–	2	–	1
Syracuse		–		–		8	–	3	–	0
Colorado State		–		–		7	–	3	–	0
New Mexico State		–		–		7	–	3	–	0
West Texas State		–		–		7	–	3	–	0
Villanova		–		–		6	–	3	–	0
Holy Cross		–		–		6	–	3	–	1
Southern Miss		–		–		6	–	4	–	0
Texas Western		–		–		6	–	4	–	0
Tulane		–		–		5	–	4	–	1
Florida State		–		–		6	–	5	–	0
Buffalo		–		–		5	–	5	–	0
Penn State		–		–		5	–	5	–	0
Air Force		–		–		4	–	6	–	0
Boston College		–		–		4	–	6	–	0
Navy		–		–		4	–	6	–	0
Utah State		–		–		4	–	6	–	0
Xavier		–		–		4	–	6	–	0
Pacific (CA)		–		–		4	–	7	–	0
San Jose State		–		–		3	–	7	–	0
Pittsburgh		–		–		1	–	9	–	0
Rankings from AP Poll

The 1966 Colorado State Rams football team represented Colorado State University as an independent during the 1966 NCAA University Division football season. In their fifth season under head coach Mike Lude, the Rams compiled a 7–3 record.

== Schedule ==
Date	Opponent	Site	Result	Attendance	Source
September 24	at South Dakota State	Alumni Stadium; Brookings, SD	W 45–14	4,100	
September 30	at BYU	Cougar Stadium; Provo, UT	L 24–27	25,023	
October 8	Tulsa	Colorado Field; Fort Collins, CO	L 6–20	14,300	
October 15	at Utah State	Romney Stadium; Logan, UT	W 10–7	12,678	
October 22	at Air Force	Falcon Stadium; Colorado Springs, CO (rivalry)	W 41–21	36,030	
October 29	No. 10 Wyoming	Colorado Field; Fort Collins, CO (rivalry)	W 12–10	15,000	
November 5	at New Mexico	University Stadium; Albuquerque, NM	W 45–6	16,855	
November 12	West Texas State^{†}	Colorado Field; Fort Collins, CO	W 35–26	14,573	
November 19	at Wichita State	Veterans Field; Wichita, KS	L 23–37	4,388	
November 26	Iowa State	Colorado Field; Fort Collins, CO	W 34–10	9,268	
^{†}Homecoming; Rankings from Coaches' Poll released prior to the game
