= 1966 Florida State Seminoles football team =

American college football season

1966 Florida State Seminoles football

Sun Bowl, L 20–28 vs. Wyoming
- Conference: Independent
- Record: 6–5
- Head coach: Bill Peterson (7th season)
- Offensive coordinator: Bill Crutchfield (3rd season)
- Offensive scheme: Pro set
- Defensive coordinator: Bob Harbison (1st season)
- Base defense: 4–3
- Captain: Game captains
- Home stadium: Doak Campbell Stadium

1966 NCAA University Division independents football records
	Conf.					Overall
Team	W		L		T	W		L		T
No. 1 Notre Dame		–		–		9	–	0	–	1
Colgate		–		–		8	–	1	–	1
No. 8 Georgia Tech		–		–		9	–	2	–	0
Army		–		–		8	–	2	–	0
Dayton		–		–		8	–	2	–	0
Houston		–		–		8	–	2	–	0
Memphis State		–		–		7	–	2	–	0
No. 9 Miami (FL)		–		–		8	–	2	–	1
Virginia Tech		–		–		8	–	2	–	1
Syracuse		–		–		8	–	3	–	0
Colorado State		–		–		7	–	3	–	0
New Mexico State		–		–		7	–	3	–	0
West Texas State		–		–		7	–	3	–	0
Villanova		–		–		6	–	3	–	0
Holy Cross		–		–		6	–	3	–	1
Southern Miss		–		–		6	–	4	–	0
Texas Western		–		–		6	–	4	–	0
Tulane		–		–		5	–	4	–	1
Florida State		–		–		6	–	5	–	0
Buffalo		–		–		5	–	5	–	0
Penn State		–		–		5	–	5	–	0
Air Force		–		–		4	–	6	–	0
Boston College		–		–		4	–	6	–	0
Navy		–		–		4	–	6	–	0
Utah State		–		–		4	–	6	–	0
Xavier		–		–		4	–	6	–	0
Pacific (CA)		–		–		4	–	7	–	0
San Jose State		–		–		3	–	7	–	0
Pittsburgh		–		–		1	–	9	–	0
Rankings from AP Poll

The 1966 Florida State Seminoles football team represented Florida State University as an independent during the 1966 NCAA University Division football season. Led by seventh-year head coach Bill Peterson, the Seminoles compiled a record of 6–5. Florida State was invited to the Sun Bowl, where the Seminoles lost to Wyoming.

== Schedule ==
Date	Opponent	Site	TV	Result	Attendance	Source
September 17	Houston	Doak Campbell Stadium; Tallahassee, FL		L 13–21	35,643	
September 24	at Miami (FL)	Miami Orange Bowl; Miami, FL (rivalry)		W 23–20	54,262	
October 8	No. 10 Florida	Doak Campbell Stadium; Tallahassee, FL (rivalry)		L 19–22	46,698	
October 15	at Texas Tech	Jones Stadium; Lubbock, TX		W 42–33	28,307	
October 22	Mississippi State	Doak Campbell Stadium; Tallahassee, FL		W 10–0	30,133	
October 29	at Virginia Tech	Lane Stadium; Blacksburg, VA		L 21–23	31,000	
November 5	at South Carolina	Carolina Stadium; Columbia, SC		W 32–10	29,286	
November 12	at Syracuse	Archbold Stadium; Syracuse, NY		L 21–37	35,405	
November 19	Wake Forest	Doak Campbell Stadium; Tallahassee, FL		W 28–0	29,176	
November 26	Maryland	Doak Campbell Stadium; Tallahassee, FL		W 45–21	33,000	
December 24	vs. Wyoming	Sun Bowl; El Paso, TX (Sun Bowl)	NBC	L 20–28	24,381	
Rankings from AP Poll released prior to the game
