= 1966 Boston College Eagles football team =

American college football season

1966 Boston College Eagles football
- Conference: Independent
- Record: 4–6
- Head coach: Jim Miller (5th season)
- Captain: Ed Lipson
- Home stadium: Alumni Stadium

1966 NCAA University Division independents football records
	Conf.					Overall
Team	W		L		T	W		L		T
No. 1 Notre Dame		–		–		9	–	0	–	1
Colgate		–		–		8	–	1	–	1
No. 8 Georgia Tech		–		–		9	–	2	–	0
Army		–		–		8	–	2	–	0
Dayton		–		–		8	–	2	–	0
Houston		–		–		8	–	2	–	0
Memphis State		–		–		7	–	2	–	0
No. 9 Miami (FL)		–		–		8	–	2	–	1
Virginia Tech		–		–		8	–	2	–	1
Syracuse		–		–		8	–	3	–	0
Colorado State		–		–		7	–	3	–	0
New Mexico State		–		–		7	–	3	–	0
West Texas State		–		–		7	–	3	–	0
Villanova		–		–		6	–	3	–	0
Holy Cross		–		–		6	–	3	–	1
Southern Miss		–		–		6	–	4	–	0
Texas Western		–		–		6	–	4	–	0
Tulane		–		–		5	–	4	–	1
Florida State		–		–		6	–	5	–	0
Buffalo		–		–		5	–	5	–	0
Penn State		–		–		5	–	5	–	0
Air Force		–		–		4	–	6	–	0
Boston College		–		–		4	–	6	–	0
Navy		–		–		4	–	6	–	0
Utah State		–		–		4	–	6	–	0
Xavier		–		–		4	–	6	–	0
Pacific (CA)		–		–		4	–	7	–	0
San Jose State		–		–		3	–	7	–	0
Pittsburgh		–		–		1	–	9	–	0
Rankings from AP Poll

The 1966 Boston College Eagles football team represented Boston College as an independent during the 1966 NCAA University Division football season. Led by fifth-year head coach Jim Miller, the Eagles compiled a record of 4–6. Boston College played home games at Alumni Stadium in Chestnut Hill, Massachusetts.

== Schedule ==
Date	Opponent	Site	Result	Attendance	Source
September 17	at Navy	Navy–Marine Corps Memorial Stadium; Annapolis, MD	L 7–27	20,201	
September 24	Ohio	Alumni Stadium; Chestnut Hill, MA	L 14–23	19,200	
October 1	VMI	Alumni Stadium; Chestnut Hill, MA	W 14–0	10,500	
October 8	at Penn State	Beaver Stadium; University Park, PA	L 21–30	30,000	
October 15	Syracuse	Alumni Stadium; Chestnut Hill, MA	L 0–30	24,500	
October 22	Buffalo	Alumni Stadium; Chestnut Hill, MA	W 22–21	17,200	
November 5	William & Mary	Alumni Stadium; Chestnut Hill, MA	W 15–13	15,800	
November 12	at Villanova	Villanova Stadium; Villanova, PA	L 0–19	11,068	
November 19	at UMass	Alumni Stadium; Hadley, MA (rivalry)	W 14–7	16,700	
November 26	Holy Cross	Alumni Stadium; Chestnut Hill, MA (rivalry)	L 26–32	26,000	
