= 1966 Tulane Green Wave football team =

American college football season

1966 Tulane Green Wave football
- Conference: Independent
- Record: 5–4–1
- Head coach: Jim Pittman (1st season)
- Home stadium: Tulane Stadium

1966 NCAA University Division independents football records
	Conf.					Overall
Team	W		L		T	W		L		T
No. 1 Notre Dame		–		–		9	–	0	–	1
Colgate		–		–		8	–	1	–	1
No. 8 Georgia Tech		–		–		9	–	2	–	0
Army		–		–		8	–	2	–	0
Dayton		–		–		8	–	2	–	0
Houston		–		–		8	–	2	–	0
Memphis State		–		–		7	–	2	–	0
No. 9 Miami (FL)		–		–		8	–	2	–	1
Virginia Tech		–		–		8	–	2	–	1
Syracuse		–		–		8	–	3	–	0
Colorado State		–		–		7	–	3	–	0
New Mexico State		–		–		7	–	3	–	0
West Texas State		–		–		7	–	3	–	0
Villanova		–		–		6	–	3	–	0
Holy Cross		–		–		6	–	3	–	1
Southern Miss		–		–		6	–	4	–	0
Texas Western		–		–		6	–	4	–	0
Tulane		–		–		5	–	4	–	1
Florida State		–		–		6	–	5	–	0
Buffalo		–		–		5	–	5	–	0
Penn State		–		–		5	–	5	–	0
Air Force		–		–		4	–	6	–	0
Boston College		–		–		4	–	6	–	0
Navy		–		–		4	–	6	–	0
Utah State		–		–		4	–	6	–	0
Xavier		–		–		4	–	6	–	0
Pacific (CA)		–		–		4	–	7	–	0
San Jose State		–		–		3	–	7	–	0
Pittsburgh		–		–		1	–	9	–	0
Rankings from AP Poll

The 1966 Tulane Green Wave football team was an American football team that represented Tulane University as an independent during the 1966 NCAA University Division football season. In its first year under head coach Jim Pittman, Tulane compiled a 5–4–1 record and was outscored by a total of 182 to 153.

The team gained an average of 229.7 rushing yards and 76.2 passing yards per game. On defense, it gave up an average of 196.6 rushing yards and 111.5 passing yards per game. Tulane's individual statistical leaders included quarterback Bobby Duhon with 577 passing yards and 748 rushing yards and Lanis O'Steen with 240 receiving yards.

The team played home games at Tulane Stadium in New Orleans.

== Schedule ==
Date	Opponent	Site	Result	Attendance	Source
September 17	Virginia Tech	Tulane Stadium; New Orleans, LA	W 13–0	22,500	
September 24	Texas A&M	Tulane Stadium; New Orleans, LA	W 21–13	33,000	
October 1	at Stanford	Stanford Stadium; Stanford, CA	L 14–33	26,000–26,500	
October 8	at Virginia	Scott Stadium; Charlottesville, VA	W 20–6	20,000	
October 15	Cincinnati	Tulane Stadium; New Orleans, LA	W 28–21	38,570–38,750	
October 22	at No. 6 Georgia Tech	Grant Field; Atlanta, GA	L 17–35	44,355	
October 29	at Vanderbilt	Dudley Field; Nashville, TN	W 13–12	12,614	
November 5	Miami (FL)	Tulane Stadium; New Orleans, LA	T 10–10	40,000	
November 12	at Florida	Florida Field; Gainesville, FL	L 10–31	45,102	
November 19	LSU	Tulane Stadium; New Orleans, LA (Battle for the Rag)	L 7–21	82,307	
Rankings from AP Poll released prior to the game
