= 1966 The Citadel Bulldogs football team =

American college football season

1966 The Citadel Bulldogs football
- Conference: Southern Conference
- Record: 4–6 (3–5 SoCon)
- Head coach: Red Parker (1st season)
- Home stadium: Johnson Hagood Stadium

1966 Southern Conference football standings
| | Conf. | | | | | Overall |
| Team | W | | L | | T | W | | L | | T |
|---|---|---|---|---|---|---|---|---|---|---|
| East Carolina + | 4 | – | 1 | – | 1 | 4 | – | 5 | – | 1 |
| William & Mary + | 4 | – | 1 | – | 1 | 5 | – | 4 | – | 1 |
| West Virginia | 3 | – | 0 | – | 0 | 3 | – | 5 | – | 2 |
| George Washington | 4 | – | 3 | – | 0 | 4 | – | 6 | – | 0 |
| Davidson | 2 | – | 3 | – | 0 | 4 | – | 5 | – | 0 |
| The Citadel | 3 | – | 5 | – | 0 | 4 | – | 6 | – | 0 |
| Richmond | 2 | – | 4 | – | 0 | 2 | – | 8 | – | 0 |
| VMI | 1 | – | 3 | – | 0 | 2 | – | 8 | – | 0 |
| Furman | 1 | – | 4 | – | 0 | 3 | – | 7 | – | 1 |
+ – Conference co-champions

The 1966 The Citadel Bulldogs football team represented The Citadel, The Military College of South Carolina in the 1966 NCAA University Division football season. Red Parker served as head coach for the first season. The Bulldogs played as members of the Southern Conference and played home games at Johnson Hagood Stadium.

== Schedule ==
| Date | Opponent | Site | Result | Attendance | Source |
|---|---|---|---|---|---|
| September 17 | at Vanderbilt* | Dudley Field; Nashville, TN | L 0–24 | 15,327 | |
| September 24 | at Richmond | Johnson Hagood Stadium; Charleston, SC | W 24–6 | 10,948 | |
| October 1 | East Tennessee State* | Johnson Hagood Stadium; Charleston, SC | W 3–0 | | |
| October 8 | George Washington | Johnson Hagood Stadium; Charleston, SC | L 13–21 | 9,545 | |
| October 15 | at William & Mary | Cary Field; Williamsburg, VA | L 6–24 | 11,000 | |
| October 22 | East Carolina^{†} | Johnson Hagood Stadium; Charleston, SC | L 17–27 | 10,400 | |
| October 29 | at Davidson | Richardson Stadium; Davidson, NC | L 17–21 | 9,200 | |
| November 5 | at West Virginia | Mountaineer Field; Morgantown, WV | L 0–35 | 16,000 | |
| November 12 | VMI | Johnson Hagood Stadium; Charleston, SC (rivalry) | W 30–14 | | |
| November 19 | at Furman | Sirrine Stadium; Greenville, SC (rivalry) | W 10–6 | | |
*Non-conference game; ^{†}Homecoming
