= 1966 Southern Miss Southerners football team =

American college football season

1966 Southern Miss Southerners football
- Conference: Independent
- Record: 6–4
- Head coach: Thad Vann (18th season)
- Home stadium: Faulkner Field

1966 NCAA University Division independents football records
	Conf.					Overall
Team	W		L		T	W		L		T
No. 1 Notre Dame		–		–		9	–	0	–	1
Colgate		–		–		8	–	1	–	1
No. 8 Georgia Tech		–		–		9	–	2	–	0
Army		–		–		8	–	2	–	0
Dayton		–		–		8	–	2	–	0
Houston		–		–		8	–	2	–	0
Memphis State		–		–		7	–	2	–	0
No. 9 Miami (FL)		–		–		8	–	2	–	1
Virginia Tech		–		–		8	–	2	–	1
Syracuse		–		–		8	–	3	–	0
Colorado State		–		–		7	–	3	–	0
New Mexico State		–		–		7	–	3	–	0
West Texas State		–		–		7	–	3	–	0
Villanova		–		–		6	–	3	–	0
Holy Cross		–		–		6	–	3	–	1
Southern Miss		–		–		6	–	4	–	0
Texas Western		–		–		6	–	4	–	0
Tulane		–		–		5	–	4	–	1
Florida State		–		–		6	–	5	–	0
Buffalo		–		–		5	–	5	–	0
Penn State		–		–		5	–	5	–	0
Air Force		–		–		4	–	6	–	0
Boston College		–		–		4	–	6	–	0
Navy		–		–		4	–	6	–	0
Utah State		–		–		4	–	6	–	0
Xavier		–		–		4	–	6	–	0
Pacific (CA)		–		–		4	–	7	–	0
San Jose State		–		–		3	–	7	–	0
Pittsburgh		–		–		1	–	9	–	0
Rankings from AP Poll

The 1966 Southern Miss Southerners football team was an American football team that represented the University of Southern Mississippi as an independent during the 1966 NCAA University Division football season. In their eighteenth year under head coach Thad Vann, the team compiled a 6–4 record.

== Schedule ==
Date	Opponent	Site	Result	Attendance	Source
September 17	Louisiana Tech	Faulkner Field; Hattiesburg, MS (rivalry)	W 14–0	11,000	
September 24	at Southeastern Louisiana	Strawberry Stadium; Hammond, LA	W 15–13	8,000	
October 1	at Memphis State	Memphis Memorial Stadium; Memphis, TN (rivalry)	L 0–6	21,213	
October 8	at Mississippi State	Scott Field; Starkville, MS	L 9–10	23,000	
October 15	at Ole Miss	Hemingway Stadium; Oxford, MS	L 7–14	25,000	
October 29	Richmond	Faulkner Field; Hattiesburg, MS	W 27–0	8,600	
November 5	VMI^{†}	Faulkner Field; Hattiesburg, MS	W 42–6	13,000	
November 12	vs. NC State	Foreman Field; Norfolk, VA (Oyster Bowl)	W 7–6	22,000	
November 19	at East Carolina	Ficklen Memorial Stadium; Greenville, NC	W 35–14	12,811	
November 26	at No. 3 Alabama	Ladd Stadium; Mobile, AL	L 0–34	41,010	
^{†}Homecoming; Rankings from AP Poll released prior to the game
