= 1966 Georgia Tech Yellow Jackets football team =

American college football season

1966 Georgia Tech Yellow Jackets football

Orange Bowl, L 12–27 vs. Florida
- Conference: Independent

Ranking
- Coaches: No. 8
- AP: No. 8
- Record: 9–2
- Head coach: Bobby Dodd (22nd season)
- Captains: Jim Breland; Bill Moorer; Billy Schroer; Sammy Burke
- Home stadium: Grant Field

1966 NCAA University Division independents football records
	Conf.					Overall
Team	W		L		T	W		L		T
No. 1 Notre Dame		–		–		9	–	0	–	1
Colgate		–		–		8	–	1	–	1
No. 8 Georgia Tech		–		–		9	–	2	–	0
Army		–		–		8	–	2	–	0
Dayton		–		–		8	–	2	–	0
Houston		–		–		8	–	2	–	0
Memphis State		–		–		7	–	2	–	0
No. 9 Miami (FL)		–		–		8	–	2	–	1
Virginia Tech		–		–		8	–	2	–	1
Syracuse		–		–		8	–	3	–	0
Colorado State		–		–		7	–	3	–	0
New Mexico State		–		–		7	–	3	–	0
West Texas State		–		–		7	–	3	–	0
Villanova		–		–		6	–	3	–	0
Holy Cross		–		–		6	–	3	–	1
Southern Miss		–		–		6	–	4	–	0
Texas Western		–		–		6	–	4	–	0
Tulane		–		–		5	–	4	–	1
Florida State		–		–		6	–	5	–	0
Buffalo		–		–		5	–	5	–	0
Penn State		–		–		5	–	5	–	0
Air Force		–		–		4	–	6	–	0
Boston College		–		–		4	–	6	–	0
Navy		–		–		4	–	6	–	0
Utah State		–		–		4	–	6	–	0
Xavier		–		–		4	–	6	–	0
Pacific (CA)		–		–		4	–	7	–	0
San Jose State		–		–		3	–	7	–	0
Pittsburgh		–		–		1	–	9	–	0
Rankings from AP Poll

The 1966 Georgia Tech Yellow Jackets football team represented the Georgia Institute of Technology as an independent during the 1966 NCAA University Division football season. The Yellow Jackets were led by head coach Bobby Dodd, in his 22nd and final year with the team, and played their home games at Grant Field in Atlanta.

An independent, Georgia Tech opened with nine wins, then lost at rival Georgia. They finished the regular season at 9–1 and were ranked eighth in both final polls. The Yellow Jackets were invited to the Orange Bowl, but lost to the Florida Gators.

== Schedule ==
Date	Opponent	Rank	Site	TV	Result	Attendance	Source
September 17	Texas A&M		Grant Field; Atlanta, GA		W 38–3	36,215	
September 24	Vanderbilt		Grant Field; Atlanta, GA (rivalry)		W 42–0	42,260	
October 1	Clemson	No. 9	Grant Field; Atlanta, GA (rivalry)		W 13–12	44,735	
October 8	No. 8 Tennessee	No. 9	Grant Field; Atlanta, GA (rivalry)	ABC	W 6–3	52,180	
October 15	at Auburn	No. 7	Legion Field; Birmingham, AL (rivalry)		W 17–3	48,362	
October 22	Tulane	No. 6	Grant Field; Atlanta, GA		W 35–17	44,355	
October 29	at Duke	No. 6	Duke Stadium; Durham, NC		W 48–7	42,000	
November 5	Virginia	No. 5	Grant Field; Atlanta, GA		W 14–13	42,126	
November 12	Penn State^{†}	No. 5	Grant Field; Atlanta, GA		W 21–0	50,172	
November 26	at No. 7 Georgia	No. 5	Sanford Stadium; Athens, GA (Clean, Old-Fashioned Hate)		L 14–23	48,782	
January 2, 1967	vs. Florida	No. 8	Miami Orange Bowl; Miami, FL (Orange Bowl)	NBC	L 12–27	72,426	
^{†}Homecoming; Rankings from AP Poll released prior to the game
