= 1966 William & Mary Indians football team =

American college football season

1966 William & Mary Indians football

SoCon co-champion
- Conference: Southern Conference
- Record: 5–4–1 (4–1–1 SoCon)
- Head coach: Marv Levy (3rd season)
- Captains: Chuck Albertson; Bill Conaway
- Home stadium: Cary Field

1966 Southern Conference football standings
	Conf.					Overall
Team	W		L		T	W		L		T
East Carolina +	4	–	1	–	1	4	–	5	–	1
William & Mary +	4	–	1	–	1	5	–	4	–	1
West Virginia	3	–	0	–	0	3	–	5	–	2
George Washington	4	–	3	–	0	4	–	6	–	0
Davidson	2	–	3	–	0	4	–	5	–	0
The Citadel	3	–	5	–	0	4	–	6	–	0
Richmond	2	–	4	–	0	2	–	8	–	0
VMI	1	–	3	–	0	2	–	8	–	0
Furman	1	–	4	–	0	3	–	7	–	1
+ – Conference co-champions

The 1966 William & Mary Indians football team was an American football team that represented the College of William & Mary as a member of the Southern Conference (SoCon) during the 1966 NCAA University Division football season. In their third season under head coach Marv Levy, the Indians compiled a 5–4–1 record with a mark of 4–1–1 in conference play, finishing as SoCon co-champion.

== Schedule ==
Date	Opponent	Site	Result	Attendance	Source
September 17	East Carolina	Cary Field; Williamsburg, VA	T 7–7	10,000	
September 24	at West Virginia	Mountaineer Field; Morgantown, WV	L 13–24	30,000	
October 1	at George Washington	George Washington H.S. Stadium; Alexandria, VA	W 10–3	4,000	
October 8	Villanova*	Cary Field; Williamsburg, VA	W 34–14	8,500–9,000	
October 15	The Citadel	Cary Field; Williamsburg, VA	W 24–6	11,000	
October 22	at Navy*	Navy–Marine Corps Memorial Stadium; Annapolis, MD	L 0–21	23,909	
October 29	at VMI	Alumni Memorial Field; Lexington, VA (rivalry)	W 22–15	7,000	
November 5	at Boston College*	Alumni Stadium; Chestnut Hill, MA	L 13–15	15,800	
November 12	Virginia Tech*	Cary Field; Williamsburg, VA	L 18–20	13,000	
November 19	at Richmond	City Stadium; Richmond, VA (rivalry)	W 35–19	5,000	
*Non-conference game
