= 1966 New Mexico State Aggies football team =

American college football season

1966 New Mexico State Aggies football
- Conference: Independent
- Record: 7–3
- Head coach: Warren B. Woodson (9th season)
- Home stadium: Memorial Stadium

1966 NCAA University Division independents football records
	Conf.					Overall
Team	W		L		T	W		L		T
No. 1 Notre Dame		–		–		9	–	0	–	1
Colgate		–		–		8	–	1	–	1
No. 8 Georgia Tech		–		–		9	–	2	–	0
Army		–		–		8	–	2	–	0
Dayton		–		–		8	–	2	–	0
Houston		–		–		8	–	2	–	0
Memphis State		–		–		7	–	2	–	0
No. 9 Miami (FL)		–		–		8	–	2	–	1
Virginia Tech		–		–		8	–	2	–	1
Syracuse		–		–		8	–	3	–	0
Colorado State		–		–		7	–	3	–	0
New Mexico State		–		–		7	–	3	–	0
West Texas State		–		–		7	–	3	–	0
Villanova		–		–		6	–	3	–	0
Holy Cross		–		–		6	–	3	–	1
Southern Miss		–		–		6	–	4	–	0
Texas Western		–		–		6	–	4	–	0
Tulane		–		–		5	–	4	–	1
Florida State		–		–		6	–	5	–	0
Buffalo		–		–		5	–	5	–	0
Penn State		–		–		5	–	5	–	0
Air Force		–		–		4	–	6	–	0
Boston College		–		–		4	–	6	–	0
Navy		–		–		4	–	6	–	0
Utah State		–		–		4	–	6	–	0
Xavier		–		–		4	–	6	–	0
Pacific (CA)		–		–		4	–	7	–	0
San Jose State		–		–		3	–	7	–	0
Pittsburgh		–		–		1	–	9	–	0
Rankings from AP Poll

The 1966 New Mexico State Aggies football team was an American football team that represented New Mexico State University as an independent during the 1966 NCAA University Division football season. In their ninth year under head coach Warren B. Woodson, the Aggies compiled a 7–3 record and outscored opponents by a total of 321 to 159. The team played its four home games at Memorial Stadium in Las Cruces, New Mexico.

The team's statistical leaders included quarterback Sal Olivas with 1,154 passing yards, running back Jim Bohl with 1,148 rushing yards, and Mike Carroll with 431 receiving yards. Bohl ranked third nationally in rushing yardage among major-college players for the second consecutive year and also ranked second for the scond year with 90 points scored.

== Schedule ==
Date	Opponent	Site	Result	Attendance	Source
September 10	Howard Payne	Memorial Stadium; Las Cruces, NM	W 35–7	12,000	
September 17	at North Texas State	Fouts Field; Denton, TX	L 21–25	6,000	
September 24	Arlington State	Memorial Stadium; Las Cruces, NM	W 23–10	> 12,000	
October 1	at Utah State	Romney Stadium; Logan, UT	W 23–7	10,872	
October 8	Pacific (CA)	Memorial Stadium; Las Cruces, NM	W 49–23	14,000	
October 15	Wichita State^{†}	Memorial Stadium; Las Cruces, NM	W 45–17	17,500	
October 22	at West Texas State	Buffalo Bowl; Canyon, TX	L 14–17	13,300	
October 29	at Eastern New Mexico	Greyhound Stadium; Portales, NM	W 50–13		
November 12	at New Mexico	University Stadium; Albuquerque, NM (rivalry)	W 47–12	12,272	
November 19	at Texas Western	Sun Bowl; El Paso, TX (rivalry)	L 14–28	25,521	
^{†}Homecoming
