= 1966 George Washington Colonials football team =

American college football season

1966 George Washington Colonials football
- Conference: Southern Conference
- Record: 4–6 (4–3 SoCon)
- Head coach: Jim Camp (6th season)
- Home stadium: District of Columbia Stadium

1966 Southern Conference football standings
	Conf.					Overall
Team	W		L		T	W		L		T
East Carolina +	4	–	1	–	1	4	–	5	–	1
William & Mary +	4	–	1	–	1	5	–	4	–	1
West Virginia	3	–	0	–	0	3	–	5	–	2
George Washington	4	–	3	–	0	4	–	6	–	0
Davidson	2	–	3	–	0	4	–	5	–	0
The Citadel	3	–	5	–	0	4	–	6	–	0
Richmond	2	–	4	–	0	2	–	8	–	0
VMI	1	–	3	–	0	2	–	8	–	0
Furman	1	–	4	–	0	3	–	7	–	1
+ – Conference co-champions

The 1966 George Washington Colonials football team was an American football team that represented George Washington University as part of the Southern Conference during the 1966 NCAA University Division football season. In its sixth season under head coach Jim Camp, the team compiled a 4–6 record (4–3 in the SoCon).

On January 17, 1967, the school's trustees voted to end the football program, making this the Colonials' final season.

== Schedule ==
Date	Opponent	Site	Result	Attendance	Source
September 17	at Davidson	Richardson Stadium; Davidson, NC	L 9–13	7,500	
September 24	at Virginia Tech*	Lane Stadium; Blacksburg, VA	L 0–49	18,000	
October 1	William & Mary	George Washington H.S. Stadium; Alexandria, VA	L 3–10	4,000	
October 8	at The Citadel	Johnson Hagood Stadium; Charleston, SC	W 21–13	9,545	
October 15	East Carolina	District of Columbia Stadium; Washington, DC	W 20–7	7,200	
October 22	at VMI	Alumni Memorial Field; Lexington, VA	W 13–0	4,500	
October 29	Furman	District of Columbia Stadium; Washington, DC	W 49–28	5,900	
November 5	at Army*	Michie Stadium; West Point, NY	L 7–20	30,000	
November 12	West Virginia	District of Columbia Stadium; Washington, DC	L 6–21	12,200	
November 24	Villanova*	District of Columbia Stadium; Washington, DC	L 7–16	6,800	
*Non-conference game
