= 1966 West Virginia Mountaineers football team =

American college football season

1966 West Virginia Mountaineers football
- Conference: Southern Conference
- Record: 3–5–2 (3–0 SoCon)
- Head coach: Jim Carlen (1st season)
- Home stadium: Mountaineer Field

1966 Southern Conference football standings
	Conf.					Overall
Team	W		L		T	W		L		T
East Carolina +	4	–	1	–	1	4	–	5	–	1
William & Mary +	4	–	1	–	1	5	–	4	–	1
West Virginia	3	–	0	–	0	3	–	5	–	2
George Washington	4	–	3	–	0	4	–	6	–	0
Davidson	2	–	3	–	0	4	–	5	–	0
The Citadel	3	–	5	–	0	4	–	6	–	0
Richmond	2	–	4	–	0	2	–	8	–	0
VMI	1	–	3	–	0	2	–	8	–	0
Furman	1	–	4	–	0	3	–	7	–	1
+ – Conference co-champions

The 1966 West Virginia Mountaineers football team represented West Virginia University in the 1966 NCAA University Division football season. It was the Mountaineers' 74th overall season and they competed as a member of the Southern Conference (SoCon). The team was led by head coach Jim Carlen, in his first year, and played their home games at Mountaineer Field in Morgantown, West Virginia. They finished the season with a record of three wins, five losses and two ties (3–5–2 overall, 3–0 SoCon).

== Schedule ==
Date	Opponent	Site	Result	Attendance	Source
September 17	at Duke*	Duke Stadium; urham, NC	L 15–34	25,000	
September 24	William & Mary	Mountaineer Field; Morgantown, WV	W 24–13	30,000	
October 1	at Virginia Tech*	Lane Stadium; Blacksburg, VA (rivalry)	T 13–13	25,000	
October 8	at Pittsburgh*	Pitt Stadium; Pittsburgh, PA (Backyard Brawl)	L 14–17	32,345	
October 15	at Maryland*	Byrd Stadium; College Park, MD (rivalry)	L 9–28	28,800	
October 22	Penn State*	Mountaineer Field; Morgantown, WV (rivalry)	L 6–38	15,835–30,000	
October 29	Kentucky*	Mountaineer Field; Morgantown, WV	T 14–14	28,000	
November 5	The Citadel	Mountaineer Field; Morgantown, WV	W 35–0	16,000	
November 12	at George Washington	District of Columbia Stadium; Washington, DC	W 21–6	12,200	
November 19	Syracuse*	Mountaineer Field; Morgantown, WV (rivalry)	L 7–32	19,000	
*Non-conference game
