= 1966 Navy Midshipmen football team =

American college football season

1966 Navy Midshipmen football
- Conference: Independent
- Record: 4–6
- Head coach: Bill Elias (2nd season)
- Captain: Don Downing
- Home stadium: Navy–Marine Corps Memorial Stadium

1966 NCAA University Division independents football records
	Conf.					Overall
Team	W		L		T	W		L		T
No. 1 Notre Dame		–		–		9	–	0	–	1
Colgate		–		–		8	–	1	–	1
No. 8 Georgia Tech		–		–		9	–	2	–	0
Army		–		–		8	–	2	–	0
Dayton		–		–		8	–	2	–	0
Houston		–		–		8	–	2	–	0
Memphis State		–		–		7	–	2	–	0
No. 9 Miami (FL)		–		–		8	–	2	–	1
Virginia Tech		–		–		8	–	2	–	1
Syracuse		–		–		8	–	3	–	0
Colorado State		–		–		7	–	3	–	0
New Mexico State		–		–		7	–	3	–	0
West Texas State		–		–		7	–	3	–	0
Villanova		–		–		6	–	3	–	0
Holy Cross		–		–		6	–	3	–	1
Southern Miss		–		–		6	–	4	–	0
Texas Western		–		–		6	–	4	–	0
Tulane		–		–		5	–	4	–	1
Florida State		–		–		6	–	5	–	0
Buffalo		–		–		5	–	5	–	0
Penn State		–		–		5	–	5	–	0
Air Force		–		–		4	–	6	–	0
Boston College		–		–		4	–	6	–	0
Navy		–		–		4	–	6	–	0
Utah State		–		–		4	–	6	–	0
Xavier		–		–		4	–	6	–	0
Pacific (CA)		–		–		4	–	7	–	0
San Jose State		–		–		3	–	7	–	0
Pittsburgh		–		–		1	–	9	–	0
Rankings from AP Poll

The 1966 Navy Midshipmen football team represented the United States Naval Academy (USNA) as an independent during the 1966 NCAA University Division football season. The team was led by second-year head coach Bill Elias.

== Schedule ==
Date	Opponent	Site	Result	Attendance	Source
September 17	Boston College	Navy–Marine Corps Memorial Stadium; Annapolis, MD	W 27–7	20,201	
September 24	at SMU	Cotton Bowl Stadium; Dallas, TX (rivalry)	L 3-21	58,000	
October 1	at Air Force	Falcon Stadium; Colorado Springs, CO (rivalry)	L 7–15	46,801	
October 8	at Syracuse	Archbold Stadium; Syracuse, NY	L 14–28	39,000	
October 15	at Pittsburgh	Pitt Stadium; Pittsburgh, PA	W 24-7	39,029	
October 22	William & Mary^{†}	Navy–Marine Corps Memorial Stadium; Annapolis, MD	W 21–0	23,909	
October 29	vs. Notre Dame	John F. Kennedy Stadium; Philadelphia, PA (rivalry)	L 7–31	70,101	
November 5	Duke	Navy–Marine Corps Memorial Stadium; Annapolis, MD	L 7–9	22,303	
November 12	at Vanderbilt	Dudley Field; Nashville, TN	W 30–14	18,583	
November 26	vs. Army	John F. Kennedy Stadium; Philadelphia, PA (Army–Navy Game)	L 7–20	102,000	
^{†}Homecoming

== Roster ==
1966 Navy Midshipmen football team roster
Players
Coaches
Offense

Pos.	#	Name	Class
QB	16	Phil Bassi
QB	15	John Cartwright	Jr
TE	84	Mike Clark
G	60	Tim Cocozzo
RB	35	Tom Daley
C	58	Harry Dittmann
C	54	Ron Lemon
G	66	Dave Lohr
G	67	Art Meinhold
RB	24	Terry Murray
RB	48	Bill Newton
QB	18	Ken Pease
OT	75	Rich Red
OT	79	Kit Ruland
WR	80	Tom Shrawder
WR	82	Rod Taylor

Defense

Pos.	#	Name	Class
DB	28	Rick Bayer
DT	77	Emerson Carr
DB	26	Bernie DeGeorge
DE	87	Bill Dow
LB	51	Don Downing
LB	69	Pete Eisenhauer
DB	38	Jim Goebel
DB	34	Rogers Lammers
DB	49	Scott McDaniel
DB	11	John McIntosh
DE	74	Tom McKean
LB	56	Francis Poole
DE	85	Curt Schantz
DT	78	Dave Tate

Special teams

Pos.	#	Name	Class

Head coach

- Bill Elias

Coordinators/assistant coaches

Legend

- (C) Team captain
- (S) Suspended
- (I) Ineligible
- Injured
- Redshirt
