= 1966 Davidson Wildcats football team =

American college football season

1966 Davidson Wildcats football
- Conference: Southern Conference
- Record: 4–5 (2–3 SoCon)
- Head coach: Homer Smith (2nd season)
- Home stadium: Richardson Stadium

1966 Southern Conference football standings
	Conf.					Overall
Team	W		L		T	W		L		T
East Carolina +	4	–	1	–	1	4	–	5	–	1
William & Mary +	4	–	1	–	1	5	–	4	–	1
West Virginia	3	–	0	–	0	3	–	5	–	2
George Washington	4	–	3	–	0	4	–	6	–	0
Davidson	2	–	3	–	0	4	–	5	–	0
The Citadel	3	–	5	–	0	4	–	6	–	0
Richmond	2	–	4	–	0	2	–	8	–	0
VMI	1	–	3	–	0	2	–	8	–	0
Furman	1	–	4	–	0	3	–	7	–	1
+ – Conference co-champions

The 1966 Davidson Wildcats football team represented Davidson College as a member of the Southern Conference (SoCon) during the 1966 NCAA University Division football season. Led by second-year head coach Homer Smith, the Wildcats compiled an overall record of 4–5 with a mark of 2–3 in conference play, placing fifth in the SoCon.

== Schedule ==
Date	Opponent	Site	Result	Attendance	Source
September 17	at George Washington	Richardson Stadium; Davidson, NC	W 13–9	7,500	
September 24	vs. Furman	American Legion Memorial Stadium; Charlotte, NC	L 26–28	8,340	
October 8	at East Carolina	Ficklen Memorial Stadium; Greenville, NC	L 7–40	16,903	
October 15	at Presbyterian*	Bailey Stadium; Clinton, SC	W 49–13	4,200	
October 22	at Richmond	City Stadium; Richmond, VA	L 17–23	7,000	
October 29	The Citadel^{†}	Richardson Stadium; Davidson, NC	W 21–17	9,200	
November 5	at Lehigh*	Taylor Stadium; Bethlehem, PA	W 34–27	7,500–7,600	
November 12	at Wofford*	Snyder Field; Spartanburg, SC	L 28–40	8,000	
November 19	Wittenberg*	Richardson Stadium; Davidson, NC	L 14–16		
*Non-conference game; ^{†}Homecoming
