= 1966 Buffalo Bulls football team =

American college football season

1966 Buffalo Bulls football
- Conference: Independent
- Record: 5–5
- Head coach: Doc Urich (1st season)
- Captain: Bill Taylor
- Home stadium: Rotary Field

1966 NCAA University Division independents football records
	Conf.					Overall
Team	W		L		T	W		L		T
No. 1 Notre Dame		–		–		9	–	0	–	1
Colgate		–		–		8	–	1	–	1
No. 8 Georgia Tech		–		–		9	–	2	–	0
Army		–		–		8	–	2	–	0
Dayton		–		–		8	–	2	–	0
Houston		–		–		8	–	2	–	0
Memphis State		–		–		7	–	2	–	0
No. 9 Miami (FL)		–		–		8	–	2	–	1
Virginia Tech		–		–		8	–	2	–	1
Syracuse		–		–		8	–	3	–	0
Colorado State		–		–		7	–	3	–	0
New Mexico State		–		–		7	–	3	–	0
West Texas State		–		–		7	–	3	–	0
Villanova		–		–		6	–	3	–	0
Holy Cross		–		–		6	–	3	–	1
Southern Miss		–		–		6	–	4	–	0
Texas Western		–		–		6	–	4	–	0
Tulane		–		–		5	–	4	–	1
Florida State		–		–		6	–	5	–	0
Buffalo		–		–		5	–	5	–	0
Penn State		–		–		5	–	5	–	0
Air Force		–		–		4	–	6	–	0
Boston College		–		–		4	–	6	–	0
Navy		–		–		4	–	6	–	0
Utah State		–		–		4	–	6	–	0
Xavier		–		–		4	–	6	–	0
Pacific (CA)		–		–		4	–	7	–	0
San Jose State		–		–		3	–	7	–	0
Pittsburgh		–		–		1	–	9	–	0
Rankings from AP Poll

The 1966 Buffalo Bulls football team represented the University at Buffalo as an independent during the 1966 NCAA University Division football season. Led by first-year head coach Doc Urich, the Bulls compiled a record of 5–5. The team's offense scored 220 points while the defense allowed 172 points. Buffalo played home games at Rotary Field in Buffalo, New York.

== Schedule ==
Date	Opponent	Site	Result	Attendance	Source
September 17	at Kent State	Memorial Stadium; Kent, OH	W 27–23	14,500	
September 24	Cornell	Rotary Field; Buffalo, NY	L 21–28	10,958	
October 1	Villanova	Rotary Field; Buffalo, NY	W 28–8	9,153	
October 8	at Boston University	Nickerson Field; Boston, MA	L 16–26	7,500	
October 15	at Dayton	Baujan Field; Dayton, OH	L 3–13	12,599	
October 22	at Boston College	Alumni Stadium; Chestnut Hill, MA	L 21–22	17,200	
October 29	Holy Cross	Rotary Field; Buffalo, NY	W 35–3	10,303	
November 5	Delaware	Rotary Field; Buffalo, NY	W 36–6	5,434	
November 12	at Tampa	Phillips Field; Tampa, FL	L 8–27	7,000	
November 19	Youngstown State	Rotary Field; Buffalo, NY	W 25–16	3,000	
