= 1966 Army Cadets football team =

American college football season

1966 Army Cadets football
- Conference: Independent
- Record: 8–2
- Head coach: Tom Cahill (1st season)
- Captain: Townsend Clarke
- Home stadium: Michie Stadium

1966 NCAA University Division independents football records
	Conf.					Overall
Team	W		L		T	W		L		T
No. 1 Notre Dame		–		–		9	–	0	–	1
Colgate		–		–		8	–	1	–	1
No. 8 Georgia Tech		–		–		9	–	2	–	0
Army		–		–		8	–	2	–	0
Dayton		–		–		8	–	2	–	0
Houston		–		–		8	–	2	–	0
Memphis State		–		–		7	–	2	–	0
No. 9 Miami (FL)		–		–		8	–	2	–	1
Virginia Tech		–		–		8	–	2	–	1
Syracuse		–		–		8	–	3	–	0
Colorado State		–		–		7	–	3	–	0
New Mexico State		–		–		7	–	3	–	0
West Texas State		–		–		7	–	3	–	0
Villanova		–		–		6	–	3	–	0
Holy Cross		–		–		6	–	3	–	1
Southern Miss		–		–		6	–	4	–	0
Texas Western		–		–		6	–	4	–	0
Tulane		–		–		5	–	4	–	1
Florida State		–		–		6	–	5	–	0
Buffalo		–		–		5	–	5	–	0
Penn State		–		–		5	–	5	–	0
Air Force		–		–		4	–	6	–	0
Boston College		–		–		4	–	6	–	0
Navy		–		–		4	–	6	–	0
Utah State		–		–		4	–	6	–	0
Xavier		–		–		4	–	6	–	0
Pacific (CA)		–		–		4	–	7	–	0
San Jose State		–		–		3	–	7	–	0
Pittsburgh		–		–		1	–	9	–	0
Rankings from AP Poll

The 1966 Army Cadets football team represented the United States Military Academy as an independent during the 1966 NCAA University Division football season. In their first year under head coach Tom Cahill, the Cadets compiled an 8–2 record and outscored their opponents by a combined total of 141 to 105. In the annual Army–Navy Game, the Cadets defeated the Midshipmen by a 20 to 7 score. The Cadets lost only to Notre Dame by a 35 to 0 score and to Tennessee by a 38 to 7 score.

Army linebacker Townsend Clarke was selected by the Central Press Association as a first-team player on the 1966 College Football All-America Team. Tom Cahill was voted Coach of the Year by his fellow coaches and the football writers.

== Schedule ==
Date	Opponent	Site	Result	Attendance	Source
September 17	Kansas State	Michie Stadium; West Point, NY	W 21–6	21,000	
September 24	Holy Cross	Michie Stadium; West Point, NY	W 14–0	28,000	
October 1	Penn State	Michie Stadium; West Point, NY	W 11–0	18,000	
October 8	at Notre Dame	Notre Dame Stadium; Notre Dame, IN (rivalry)	L 0–35	59,075	
October 15	at Rutgers	Rutgers Stadium; Piscataway, NJ	W 14–9	30,000	
October 22	Pittsburgh	Michie Stadium; West Point, NY	W 28–0	32,000	
October 29	vs. Tennessee	Memphis Memorial Stadium; Memphis, TN	L 7–38	48,646	
November 5	George Washington	Michie Stadium; West Point, NY	W 20–7	30,000	
November 12	at California	California Memorial Stadium; Berkeley, CA	W 6–3	31,000	
November 26	vs. Navy	John F. Kennedy Stadium; Philadelphia, PA (Army–Navy Game)	W 20–7	102,000	

== Game summaries ==
=== Penn State ===
Rain

=== George Washington ===
- Charlie Jarvis 104 Rush Yds

=== vs Navy ===
	1	2	3	4	Total
Army	7	0	0	13	20
Navy	0	7	0	0	7

== Roster ==
1966 Army Cadets football team roster
Players
Coaches
Offense

Pos.	#	Name	Class
RB		Charlie Jarvis	So
QB		Steve Lindell	So
		Gary Steele
		Terry Young

Defense

Pos.	#	Name	Class
		Jim Bevans
LB	56	Townsend Clarke (C)	Sr
		Henry Uberecken

Special teams

Pos.	#	Name	Class
P		Ron Wasilewski

Head coach

- Tom Cahill

Coordinators/assistant coaches

Legend

- (C) Team captain
- (S) Suspended
- (I) Ineligible
- Injured
- Redshirt

== Awards and honors ==
- Tom Cahill – "Coach of the Year" by American Football Coaches, Football Writers and Touchdown Club of Washington, D.C.
