= 1966 Utah State Aggies football team =

American college football season

1966 Utah State Aggies football
- Conference: Independent
- Record: 4–6
- Head coach: Tony Knap (4th season)
- Home stadium: Romney Stadium

1966 NCAA University Division independents football records
	Conf.					Overall
Team	W		L		T	W		L		T
No. 1 Notre Dame		–		–		9	–	0	–	1
Colgate		–		–		8	–	1	–	1
No. 8 Georgia Tech		–		–		9	–	2	–	0
Army		–		–		8	–	2	–	0
Dayton		–		–		8	–	2	–	0
Houston		–		–		8	–	2	–	0
Memphis State		–		–		7	–	2	–	0
No. 9 Miami (FL)		–		–		8	–	2	–	1
Virginia Tech		–		–		8	–	2	–	1
Syracuse		–		–		8	–	3	–	0
Colorado State		–		–		7	–	3	–	0
New Mexico State		–		–		7	–	3	–	0
West Texas State		–		–		7	–	3	–	0
Villanova		–		–		6	–	3	–	0
Holy Cross		–		–		6	–	3	–	1
Southern Miss		–		–		6	–	4	–	0
Texas Western		–		–		6	–	4	–	0
Tulane		–		–		5	–	4	–	1
Florida State		–		–		6	–	5	–	0
Buffalo		–		–		5	–	5	–	0
Penn State		–		–		5	–	5	–	0
Air Force		–		–		4	–	6	–	0
Boston College		–		–		4	–	6	–	0
Navy		–		–		4	–	6	–	0
Utah State		–		–		4	–	6	–	0
Xavier		–		–		4	–	6	–	0
Pacific (CA)		–		–		4	–	7	–	0
San Jose State		–		–		3	–	7	–	0
Pittsburgh		–		–		1	–	9	–	0
Rankings from AP Poll

The 1966 Utah State Aggies football team was an American football team that represented Utah State University as an independent during the 1966 NCAA University Division football season. In their fourth and final season under head coach Tony Knap, the Aggies compiled a 4–6 record and outscored all opponents by a total of 181 to 163.

The team's statistical leaders included John Pappas with 535 passing yards, Eric Maughan with 574 rushing yards and 31 points scored, Dave Clark with 251 receiving yards.

Knap resigned after the season in January 1967 for an assistant coaching position with the BC Lions in the Canadian Football League (CFL). He was succeeded in February by Chuck Mills, the offensive coordinator with the Kansas City Chiefs, the champions of the American Football League (AFL).

== Schedule ==
Date	Opponent	Site	Result	Attendance	Source
September 17	at New Mexico	University Stadium; Albuquerque, NM	L 8–17	20,570	
September 24	at No. 4 Nebraska	Memorial Stadium; Lincoln, NE	L 7–28	63,543	
October 1	New Mexico State	Romney Stadium; Logan, UT	L 7–23	10,872	
October 8	at BYU	Cougar Stadium; Provo, UT (rivalry)	L 7–27	29,335	
October 15	Colorado State	Romney Stadium; Logan, UT	L 7–10	12,678	
October 22	at Wyoming	War Memorial Stadium; Laramie, WY (rivalry)	L 10–35	18,253	
November 5	at Pacific (CA)	Pacific Memorial Stadium; Stockton, CA	W 47–9	11,000	
November 12	San Jose State	Romney Stadium; Logan, UT	W 27–7	8,620	
November 19	at Utah	Ute Stadium; Salt Lake City, UT (rivalry)	W 13–7	20,176	
November 26	at Hawaii	Honolulu Stadium; Honolulu, HI (Shrine Aloha Bowl Classic)	W 48–0	11,000	
Rankings from AP Poll released prior to the game
