= 1966 Air Force Falcons football team =

American college football season

1966 Air Force Falcons football
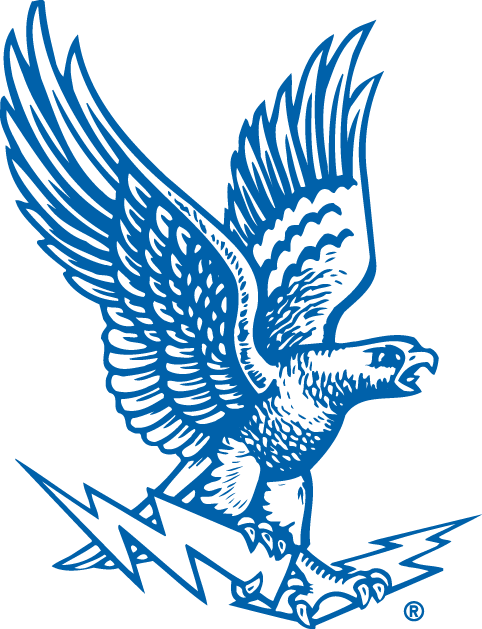
- Conference: Independent
- Record: 4–6
- Head coach: Ben Martin (9th season)
- Captains: Lloyd Duncan; Scott Jackson
- Home stadium: Falcon Stadium

1966 NCAA University Division independents football records
	Conf.					Overall
Team	W		L		T	W		L		T
No. 1 Notre Dame		–		–		9	–	0	–	1
Colgate		–		–		8	–	1	–	1
No. 8 Georgia Tech		–		–		9	–	2	–	0
Army		–		–		8	–	2	–	0
Dayton		–		–		8	–	2	–	0
Houston		–		–		8	–	2	–	0
Memphis State		–		–		7	–	2	–	0
No. 9 Miami (FL)		–		–		8	–	2	–	1
Virginia Tech		–		–		8	–	2	–	1
Syracuse		–		–		8	–	3	–	0
Colorado State		–		–		7	–	3	–	0
New Mexico State		–		–		7	–	3	–	0
West Texas State		–		–		7	–	3	–	0
Villanova		–		–		6	–	3	–	0
Holy Cross		–		–		6	–	3	–	1
Southern Miss		–		–		6	–	4	–	0
Texas Western		–		–		6	–	4	–	0
Tulane		–		–		5	–	4	–	1
Florida State		–		–		6	–	5	–	0
Buffalo		–		–		5	–	5	–	0
Penn State		–		–		5	–	5	–	0
Air Force		–		–		4	–	6	–	0
Boston College		–		–		4	–	6	–	0
Navy		–		–		4	–	6	–	0
Utah State		–		–		4	–	6	–	0
Xavier		–		–		4	–	6	–	0
Pacific (CA)		–		–		4	–	7	–	0
San Jose State		–		–		3	–	7	–	0
Pittsburgh		–		–		1	–	9	–	0
Rankings from AP Poll

The 1966 Air Force Falcons football team represented the United States Air Force Academy as an independent during the 1966 NCAA University Division football season. Led by ninth-year head coach Ben Martin, the Falcons compiled a record of 4–6 and were outscored by their opponents 161–154. Air Force played their home games at Falcon Stadium in Colorado Springs, Colorado.

== Schedule ==
Date	Opponent	Site	Result	Attendance	Source
September 17	Wyoming	Falcon Stadium; Colorado Springs, CO	L 0–13	27,852	
September 24	at Washington	Husky Stadium; Seattle, WA	W 10–0	56,350	
October 1	Navy	Falcon Stadium; Colorado Springs, CO (rivalry)	W 15–7	46,801	
October 8	Hawaii	Falcon Stadium; Colorado Springs, CO (rivalry)	W 54–0	37,786	
October 15	Oregon	Falcon Stadium; Colorado Springs, CO	L 6–17	27,289	
October 22	Colorado State	Falcon Stadium; Colorado Springs, CO (rivalry)	L 21–41	36,030	
October 29	at No. 3 UCLA	Los Angeles Memorial Coliseum; Los Angeles, CA	L 13–38	34,654	
November 5	at Stanford	Stanford Stadium; Stanford, CA	L 6–21	36,000	
November 12	at North Carolina	Kenan Memorial Stadium; Chapel Hill, NC	W 20–14	31,000	
November 19	at Colorado	Folsom Field; Boulder, CO	L 9–10	39,876	
Rankings from AP Poll released prior to the game
