= 1966 San Jose State Spartans football team =

American college football season

1966 San Jose State Spartans football
- Conference: Independent
- Record: 3–7
- Head coach: Harry Anderson (2nd season)
- Home stadium: Spartan Stadium

1966 NCAA University Division independents football records
	Conf.					Overall
Team	W		L		T	W		L		T
No. 1 Notre Dame		–		–		9	–	0	–	1
Colgate		–		–		8	–	1	–	1
No. 8 Georgia Tech		–		–		9	–	2	–	0
Army		–		–		8	–	2	–	0
Dayton		–		–		8	–	2	–	0
Houston		–		–		8	–	2	–	0
Memphis State		–		–		7	–	2	–	0
No. 9 Miami (FL)		–		–		8	–	2	–	1
Virginia Tech		–		–		8	–	2	–	1
Syracuse		–		–		8	–	3	–	0
Colorado State		–		–		7	–	3	–	0
New Mexico State		–		–		7	–	3	–	0
West Texas State		–		–		7	–	3	–	0
Villanova		–		–		6	–	3	–	0
Holy Cross		–		–		6	–	3	–	1
Southern Miss		–		–		6	–	4	–	0
Texas Western		–		–		6	–	4	–	0
Tulane		–		–		5	–	4	–	1
Florida State		–		–		6	–	5	–	0
Buffalo		–		–		5	–	5	–	0
Penn State		–		–		5	–	5	–	0
Air Force		–		–		4	–	6	–	0
Boston College		–		–		4	–	6	–	0
Navy		–		–		4	–	6	–	0
Utah State		–		–		4	–	6	–	0
Xavier		–		–		4	–	6	–	0
Pacific (CA)		–		–		4	–	7	–	0
San Jose State		–		–		3	–	7	–	0
Pittsburgh		–		–		1	–	9	–	0
Rankings from AP Poll

The 1966 San Jose State Spartans football team represented San Jose State College—now known as San Jose State University—as an independent during the 1966 NCAA University Division football season. Led by second-year head coach Harry Anderson, the Spartans compiled a record of 3–7 and were outscored by opponents 198 to 151. The team played home games at Spartan Stadium in San Jose, California.

== Schedule ==
Date	Opponent	Site	Result	Attendance	Source
September 17	at Stanford	Stanford Stadium; Stanford, CA (rivalry)	L 21–25	36,000	
September 24	BYU	Spartan Stadium; San Jose, CA	L 9–19	17,000	
October 1	at Oregon	Hayward Field; Eugene, OR	W 21–7	16,000	
October 8	at California	California Memorial Stadium; Berkeley, CA	W 24–0	34,525	
October 15	San Diego State	Spartan Stadium; San Jose, CA	L 0–25	19,400	
October 22	at Texas Western	Sun Bowl; El Paso, TX	L 0–35	28,263	
October 29	at Pacific (CA)	Pacific Memorial Stadium; Stockton, CA (Victory Bell)	L 35–38	18,000	
November 5	Idaho	Spartan Stadium; San Jose, CA	W 21–7	16,200	
November 12	at Utah State	Romney Stadium (Note: This stadium is the predecessor to the current Maverik Stadium (Romney Stadium) that has served as the home of the Aggies since 1968); Logan, UT	L 7–27	8,620	
November 19	Fresno State	Spartan Stadium; San Jose, CA (rivalry)	L 13–15	5,400	

== Team players in the NFL/AFL ==
The following San Jose State players were selected in the 1967 NFL/AFL draft.

Player	Position	Round	Overall	NFL team
Tommie Smith	Wide receiver	9	226	Los Angeles Rams
Eric Watts	Defensive back	12	297	Detroit Lions
Martin Baccaglio	Defensive end	14	355	San Diego Chargers

The following finished their San Jose State career in 1966, were not drafted, but played in the AFL.

Player	Position	First AFL team
Bill Peterson	Linebacker – Tight end	1968 Cincinnati Bengals
