= 1966 Liberty Bowl =

American college football game

- 8th Liberty Bowl
Virginia Tech Gobblers	Miami Hurricanes
(8–1–1)	(7-2-1)
Independent	Independent
7	14
Head coach: Jerry Claiborne	Head coach: Charlie Tate
AP / Coaches; NR / 20	AP / Coaches; 9 / 10
	1	2	3	4	Total
Virginia Tech	7	0	0	0	7
Miami	0	0	7	7	14
- Date: December 10, 1966
- Season: 1966
- Stadium: Memphis Memorial Stadium
- Location: Memphis, Tennessee
- MVP: Jimmy Cox, Miami
- Referee: Johnny Cook (SEC; split crew: SEC, Southern)
- Attendance: 25,012

United States TV coverage
- Network: ABC

The 1966 Liberty Bowl was a post-season American college football bowl game between the Virginia Tech Gobblers (Note: The team's nickname became Hokies in 1981.) and the Miami Hurricanes, both independent programs. The eighth edition of the Liberty Bowl, it was played on December 10, 1966, at Memphis Memorial Stadium in Memphis, Tennessee. The game was the final contest of the 1966 NCAA University Division football season for both teams, and ended in a 14–7 victory for Miami. A then-record 39,101 tickets were sold for the game, but due to 36 °F (2 °C) temperatures at game time, only 25,012 spectators attended.

== Teams ==
This was the second time that the two programs had faced each other. The previous meeting, held in 1953, ended in a 26–0 shutout victory for Miami.

=== Virginia Tech ===
Virginia Tech was led on defense by All-American safety Frank Loria, who caught three interceptions and returned three punts for touchdowns as a junior during the 1966 season. In addition, defensive end George Foussekis was named to the Associated Press second-team All-America team, and helped keep the Hurricanes' offense in check for most of the game. On offense, fullback Tommy Groom served as the third of the team's three team captains during the game. Virginia Tech was coached by Jerry Claiborne, who was in his sixth year as head coach. Under Claiborne, the team had amassed a strong 8–1–1 record with wins over Kentucky, Florida State, and Virginia and a 70–12 blowout win over traditional rival VMI in the final game of the season. Virginia Tech's sole loss came in the first game of the season against Tulane, and the team had a 13–13 tie against West Virginia.

The game marked just the second time that Virginia Tech had played in a bowl game since they first fielded a football team in 1892, following the 1947 Sun Bowl. Future Virginia Tech head football coach Frank Beamer participated in the game as a backup cornerback for Virginia Tech.

=== Miami ===
The ninth-ranked Hurricanes boasted a 7–2–1 regular-season record, including wins over three teams that played in New Year's bowl games--Southern California (Rose), Georgia (Cotton), and Florida (Orange). The Hurricanes were led on the field by three-time All-American lineback Ted Hendricks, who would later go on to a Hall of Fame career in the National Football League. Off the field, the Hurricanes were coached by Charlie Tate, who would head the Hurricanes football team until 1970.

== Game summary ==
The game kicked off in frigid 36 °F (2 °C) weather, and from the beginning, defense dominated. In the first half, Virginia Tech held Miami to just 16 yards of total offense. On the opposite side of the ball, Miami set bowl game records for fewest rushing yards allowed and fewest first downs allowed. Virginia Tech got the first big break of the game after blocking Miami's first punt of the game. Taking over at the Miami 21-yard line, it took Virginia Tech just five plays to march into the end zone for an early 7–0 lead. The teams battled to a stalemate for the rest of the first half, and Virginia Tech went into halftime still clinging to a 7–0 lead.

In the second half, Virginia Tech's fortune turned. Late in the third quarter, their defense stopped Miami's offense again, but instead of receiving the punt cleanly, Virginia Tech committed a roughing the kicker penalty that allowed Miami to retain possession of the ball with a first down. A few plays later, Miami scored its first touchdown of the game. In the fourth quarter Miami finally took the lead on a 10-play, 70-yard drive. Virginia Tech was unable to answer the Hurricanes' score, and Miami won the game, 14–7.

=== Statistics ===
Statistical comparison
	Virginia Tech	UM
1st Downs	7	11
Total yards	111	163
Passing yards	75	108
Rushing yards	36	55
Penalties	6–57	7–80
Turnovers	3	1

Miami's Jimmy Cox was named the game's most valuable player after catching five passes for 77 yards—accounting for nearly half of Miami's total offensive output. Miami earned just three rushing first downs during the game, setting a Liberty Bowl record that has yet to be broken.

Each team had two players pass the ball. Virginia Tech's Tommy Stafford finished the game having completed four 13 passes for 59 yards and one interception. Several times during the game, Virginia Tech had also played with Barker passing the ball. He finished having completed two of his three passes for 13 yards. On the Miami side of the ball, Miller completed nine of 26 passes for 99 yards and Olivo completed one pass for nine yards.

On the ground, Virginia Tech's Tommy Francisco led all runners with 21 carries for 55 yards. Backing up Francisco was Sal Garcia, who finished with three carries for 15 yards. Miami's leading rusher was McGee, who carried the ball 12 times for 36 yards. Backing up McGee was Acuff, who finished with six carries for 25 yards.

== See also ==
- Miami–Virginia Tech football rivalry
