= Bill Neal (American football) =

American football player and coach (1931–2024)

Biographical details
- Born: December 28, 1931; Russell, Kentucky, U.S.
- Died: March 28, 2024 (aged 92)

Playing career
- 1951–1953: George Washington
- Position: Lineman

Coaching career (HC unless noted)
- 1954–1960: George Washington (assistant)
- 1961–1964: Virginia (line)
- 1965: Navy (assistant)
- 1966–1968: Pittsburgh (assistant)
- 1969: IUP (DC)
- 1970–1978: IUP

Head coaching record
- Overall: 50–31–3

William A. Neal (December 28, 1931 – March 28, 2024) was an American college football player and coach. He served as the head football coach at Indiana University of Pennsylvania from 1970 to 1978, compiling a record of 50–31–3.

Neal was born in Russell, Kentucky, on December 28, 1931. He began his coaching career at George Washington University, where was an assistant coach for seven years, from 1954 to 1960.

Neal died on March 28, 2024, at the age of 92.

== Head coaching record ==
Year	Team	Overall	Conference	Standing	Bowl/playoffs
IUP Indians (NCAA College Division independent) (1970–1972)
1970	IUP	5–4			
1971	IUP	7–2			
1972	IUP	8–1			
IUP Indians (Pennsylvania State Athletic Conference) (1973–1978)
1973	IUP	4–5	NA	NA	
1974	IUP	6–4	4–2	3rd (West)	
1975	IUP	8–1–1	4–1–1	2nd (West)	
1976	IUP	4–5	3–3	T–4th (West)	
1977	IUP	4–4–1	2–3–1	T–5th (West)	
1978	IUP	4–5–1	2–4	5th (West)	
IUP:		50–31–3	15–13–2		
Total:		50–31–3			
