= Jim O'Hora =

American football player and coach (1915–2005)

James Joseph O’Hora (February 16, 1915 – August 5, 2005) was an American college football coach for over 30 years.

== Early years ==
O’Hora was born in Dunmore, Pennsylvania. His father, Michael, was an immigrant from Ballina, County Mayo, Ireland who entered the United States through Ellis Island. His mother, Mary Butler O’Hora, was also an immigrant from Ireland. O’Hora played football for Dunmore High School. He was a member of its champion team in 1930 and was named to the Lackawanna County, Pennsylvania All Academic Team in 1932. He graduated in 1932.

He attended The Pennsylvania State College which later grew to Penn State. While playing center for the Penn State Nittany Lions under Coach Bob Higgins, O’Hora lettered in 1933, 1934 and 1935. He earned a Bachelor of Arts in Health and Physical Education from PSU in 1936. He was certified in Pennsylvania to teach Biological Science, Social Studies, and Physical education.

== Career ==
His coaching career began in 1936, as a graduate assistant at Penn State University while working on his master's degree. After earning a master's degree in 1937, O'Hora was a high school gym teacher and head football coach at Roaring Spring High School at Roaring Spring, Pennsylvania. In 1939, he became head football coach, head basketball coach and head baseball coach at Mahanoy Township High School in Mahanoy City, Pennsylvania.

On November 28, 1942, he married Elizabeth Emily Miller a social studies teacher from Mahanoy City, at Queen of All Saints RCC, Brooklyn, New York.

In 1942, O’Hora enlisted in the Gene Tumey Program which was part of the US Navy Physical Fitness Program. His rank was Chief Petty Officer. He was promoted to Lieutenant in 1942. O'Hora trained at the Naval War College in Newport, Rhode Island. He became the commanding officer of U.S.S. LSM 8 in the Pacific fleet in 1944. He served in the Luzon Philippines Campaign.

After the war he returned to Mahanoy Township for one year before joining the Penn State coaching staff in 1946. O'Hora was a full-time assistant for three seasons under Bob Higgins. He then served one year with Joe Bedenk (1949), 16 seasons with Rip Engle (1950–65) and 11 with Joe Paterno from 1966 to 1976.

O'Hora initially served as line coach. He became the defensive coordinator and assistant head coach (1974–76). O'Hora was a key factor in Penn State earning 29 winning seasons during his 31 years on the staff.

O'Hora directed the Nittany Lions defenses on the unbeaten 1947, 1968, 1969 and 1973 squads. The 1968 Penn State team allowed less than 10 points in six games. The 1969 Lion squad did not allow the opposition to score more than nine points in seven games. The last 1969 game was a 10–3 win over Missouri in the Orange Bowl. The 1973 defense did not permit more than nine points in any of Penn State's initial six games. They ended PSU’s first 12–0 season with a 16–9 win over Louisiana State University in the Orange Bowl. *

During his extraordinary tenure, he coached with such notables as: Earl Bruce, Frank Patrick, Al Michaels, Sever "Tor" Toretti, J.T. White, Dan Radakovich, Joe McMullen, and George Welsh.

== Later years ==
O’Hora retired from Penn State in 1977 as an Associate Professor of Health, Physical Education and Recreation. The football program established the Jim O'Hora Award. It is annually presented to a defensive player for "exemplary conduct, loyalty, interest, attitude and improvement" during spring practice. He was inducted into the Pennsylvania Football Hall of Fame in 1992.

O’Hora was a member of the B.P.O.E #1600; State College; the American Legion #245; State College, Penn State Quarterback Club; and the Penn State Football Lettermen's Club.

O’Hora and his wife had four children.

O’Hora died on August 5, 2005, in State College, Pennsylvania.
