= 1966 NCAA University Division football season =

American college football season

- Preseason AP No. 1: Alabama
- Regular season: September 17 – December 3, 1966
- Number of bowls: 8
- Bowl games: December 10, 1966 – January 2, 1967
- Champion(s): Notre Dame (AP, Coaches, FWAA, NFF); Michigan State (NFF)
- Heisman: Florida quarterback Steve Spurrier

The 1966 University Division football season was marked by some controversy as the year of "The Tie", a famous 10–10 game between the two top-ranked teams, Michigan State and Notre Dame on November 19. Both teams were crowned national champions by various organizations after the regular season concluded, and neither participated in a bowl game. Alabama finished the regular season undefeated and was third in the AP poll, while Georgia was fourth. Alabama went on to win the Sugar Bowl in dominant fashion. During the 20th century, the NCAA had no playoff for the major college football teams in the University Division, later known as Division I-A.

The NCAA Football Guide, however, did note an "unofficial national champion" based on the top ranked teams in the "wire service" (AP and UPI) polls. The "writers' poll" by Associated Press (AP) was the most popular, followed by the "coaches' poll" by United Press International) (UPI). In 1966, both services issued their final polls at the close of the regular season, but before teams competed in bowl games. The Associated Press presented the "AP Trophy" to the winner.

The AP poll in 1966 consisted of the votes of as many as 63 sportswriters, though not all of them voted in every poll. Those who cast votes would give their opinion of the ten best teams. Under a point system of 10 points for first place, 9 for second, etc., the "overall" ranking was determined. In the preseason poll for 1966, Alabama was slightly ahead of Michigan State in first place votes (15 vs. 12) and points.

Prior to the start of the 1966 season, East Carolina was elevated to the University Division.

ABC began showing college football in color this season. By the NCAA rules, only eight national and five regional telecasts were allowed during the season.

== Rule changes ==
- A jersey numbering system was adopted requiring the center, tackles and guards on the offense to wear numbers 50–79. The offensive team captain must designate the players occupying these positions to an official upon request; failure to do so results in a five-yard penalty.
- Intentionally throwing a backward pass out of bounds to conserve time is illegal.
- Pyramiding players (allowing a player to stand on another player) in an effort to block a kick is outlawed. This change was made in response to an incident the previous season in the Ivy League: two Cornell players stood on the shoulders of two teammates to block field goal attempts by Princeton placekicker Charlie Gogolak.

== Conference and program changes ==
School	1965 Conference	1966 Conference
Akron Zips	Ohio Athletic	Independent
Boston University Terriers	University Division	College Division
Tulane Green Wave	SEC	Independent

== September ==
In the preseason poll released on September 12, the top six teams were from different conferences. First place was the defending AP champion Alabama Crimson Tide (SEC), followed by defending UPI champ Michigan State (Big Ten), Nebraska (Big Eight), UCLA (AAWU/Pacific-8), Arkansas (SWC) and Notre Dame (independent).

September 17 No. 2 Michigan State beat North Carolina State 28–10 at home, No. 3 Nebraska beat Texas Christian (TCU) 14–10, and No. 4 UCLA crushed Pittsburgh 57–14 in Los Angeles. At a game in Little Rock, No. 5 Arkansas beat visiting Oklahoma State 14–10, but fell to 6th place in the next poll, while No. 9 USC won at Texas, 10–6. No. 1 Alabama had not yet begun its season. The next poll was No. 1 Michigan State, No. 2 UCLA, No. 3 Alabama, No. 4 Nebraska, and No. 5 USC.

September 24 No. 1 Michigan State beat Penn State 42–8 at home in East Lansing. No. 2 UCLA won 31–12 at Syracuse, No. 3 Alabama easily handled Louisiana Tech 34–0, and No. 4 Nebraska won over Utah State 28–7 but would drop to sixth. The Cornhuskers were replaced by No. 8 Notre Dame, which had beaten No. 7 Purdue at home, 26–14. No. 5 USC beat Wisconsin in Los Angeles 38–3. The next poll was No. 1 Michigan State, No. 2 UCLA, No. 3 Alabama, No. 4 Notre Dame, and No. 5 USC.

== October ==
October 1 No. 1 Michigan State won at Illinois, 26–10. No. 2 UCLA hosted Missouri and won, 24–15. No. 3 Alabama beat Mississippi 17–7, while No. 4 Notre Dame won 35–7 at Northwestern. No. 5 USC played Oregon State in a game at Portland, winning 21–0, but the Trojans still dropped to sixth in the next poll. Their place was taken by No. 7 Arkansas, which shut out Texas Christian by the same 21–0 score. The next poll was No. 1 Michigan State, No. 2 UCLA, No. 3 Notre Dame, No. 4 Alabama, and No. 5 Arkansas.

October 8 No. 1 Michigan State beat Michigan at home, 20–7. No. 2 UCLA won in Houston against Rice, 27–24. No. 3 Notre Dame and No. 4 Alabama registered shutouts, beating Army (35–0) and Clemson (26–0), respectively. No. 5 Arkansas was itself shut out, 7–0, by Baylor. They were replaced at fifth place by No. 6 USC which won 17–14 at home against Washington. The other undefeated team to lose this week was No. 8 Tennessee, which lost 6–3 to No. 9 Georgia Tech. With two unbeatens gone, the eight remaining in the next poll were No. 1 Michigan State, No. 2 Notre Dame, No. 3 Alabama, No. 4 UCLA, No. 5 USC, No. 6 Nebraska, No. 7 Georgia Tech, and No. 8 Florida.

October 15 No. 1 Michigan State narrowly beat Ohio State in Columbus, 11–8, while No. 2 Notre Dame held North Carolina scoreless at home, 32–0, which was enough for them to trade places in the next poll. Likewise, No. 3 Alabama edged Tennessee 11–10 while No. 4 UCLA overwhelmed Penn State 49–11. UCLA's Los Angeles rival, No. 5 USC, beat Stanford 21–7. No. 6 Nebraska won 21–10 over Kansas State. No. 7 Georgia Tech met Auburn in Birmingham, winning 17–3 to stay unbeaten, and No. 8 Florida won at North Carolina State, 17–10. Oklahoma, which was scheduled to face Notre Dame next, beat Kansas 35–0, while No. 9 Purdue (set to face Michigan State) beat Michigan 22–21 in Ann Arbor. Purdue was the only team with a loss in the next poll: No. 1 Notre Dame, No. 2 Michigan State, No. 3 UCLA, No. 4 Alabama, No. 5 USC, No. 6 Georgia Tech, No. 7 Nebraska, No. 8 Florida, No. 9 Purdue, and No. 10 Oklahoma.

On October 22, No. 1 Notre Dame met No. 10 Oklahoma at Norman and beat them, 38–0. No. 2 Michigan State hosted No. 9 Purdue and won 41–20, which would eventually give State the Big Ten crown. No. 3 UCLA won 28–15 at California in Berkeley, while in Birmingham, No. 4 Alabama handled Vanderbilt 42–6 and No. 5 USC beat visiting Clemson 30–0. It was No. 6 Georgia Tech over Tulane, 35–17, and No. 7 Nebraska won 21–19 at Colorado, a victory which would later deliver the Big 8 championship to the Cornhuskers. No. 8 Florida defeated N.C. State 17−10. Arkansas returned to the Top Ten with a 41–0 triumph over Wichita State at Little Rock and Wyoming (which had gone 6–0 with a 35–10 win over Utah State) also entered the poll. The next poll had nine unbeaten teams (all but Arkansas): No. 1 Notre Dame, No. 2 Michigan State, No. 3 UCLA, No. 4 Alabama, No. 5 USC, No. 6 Georgia Tech, No. 7 Florida, No. 8 Nebraska, No. 9 Arkansas, and No. 10 Wyoming.

October 29 Week Eight featured games in large cities. In a Friday night game in Miami, No. 5 USC lost 10–7 to the Hurricanes. No. 1 Notre Dame met Navy in Philadelphia and won 31–7. No. 2 Michigan State traveled to metropolitan Chicago (Evanston) to beat Northwestern 22–0. In Los Angeles, No. 3 UCLA beat the Air Force Academy 38–13. No. 4 Alabama beat Mississippi State 27–14 in Tuscaloosa. Three other teams won again to go 7–0: No. 6 Georgia Tech over Duke 48–7, No. 7 Florida over Auburn 30–27, and No. 8 Nebraska 35–0 over Missouri. No. 9 Arkansas won 34–0 over Texas A&M, and No. 10 Wyoming's Top Ten ranking ended with its first loss, 12–10 at Colorado State. The remaining unbeatens in the next poll were No. 1 Notre Dame, No. 2 Michigan State, No. 3 UCLA, No. 4 Alabama, No. 5 Georgia Tech, No. 6 Nebraska, and No. 7 Florida.

== November ==
November 5 No. 1 Notre Dame beat Pittsburgh at home, 40–0. No. 2 Michigan State beat Iowa at home, 56–7. In Seattle, No. 3 UCLA suffered their first loss, falling 16–3 to Washington. No. 4 Alabama defeated LSU 21–0 at Birmingham. No. 5 Georgia Tech got by Virginia in Atlanta, 14–13. No. 6 Nebraska won 24–13 at Kansas, but No. 7 Florida took its first loss, 27−10 against Georgia. The next poll led off with the nation's five unbeaten major teams: No. 1 Notre Dame, No. 2 Michigan State, No. 3 Alabama, No. 4 Nebraska, and No. 5 Georgia Tech.

On November 12, No. 1 Notre Dame crushed Duke 64–0 at home. No. 2 Michigan State won at Indiana 37–19 and wrapped up the Big Ten title. No. 3 Alabama beat South Carolina 24–0 at Tuscaloosa for its third straight shutout win. No. 4 Nebraska won 21–6 over Oklahoma State, and No. 5 Georgia Tech beat Penn State 21–0. The Top Five remained the same, as No. 1 Notre Dame and No. 2 Michigan State prepared to meet on State's turf in East Lansing.

November 19, In "the game of the century," No. 1 Notre Dame played No. 2 Michigan State to a 10–10 tie in East Lansing. Notre Dame coach Ara Parseghian came under criticism for his cautious tactics, running out the clock at the end of the game rather than risking a turnover with an aggressive bid for a touchdown. After the game, the AP and UPI split, with the AP keeping Notre Dame at No. 1 and the UPI choosing Michigan State. The Spartans closed their season with a 9–0–1 record and no postseason game, since they had played in the previous year's Rose Bowl and were barred from a repeat. Without injured star QB Gary Beban, No. 8 UCLA still managed to beat No. 7 USC 14–7. Although UCLA finished with a better overall record and ranking than USC, it was the Trojans who were voted by the conference to go on to the Rose Bowl, due to having played one more "conference game." UCLA students took to the streets protesting the decision in anger, at one point blocking the nearby 405 Freeway. The Rose Bowl would pit USC vs. Big Ten runner-up Purdue (which had been blown out by Michigan State in October) when the ideal matchup was largely considered UCLA vs. Michigan State. No. 3 Alabama, No. 4 Nebraska and No. 5 Georgia Tech were all idle. The AP's top five remained unchanged.

On Thanksgiving Day, No. 4 Nebraska and Oklahoma met at Norman, with the Sooners winning 10–9 to leave the Cornhuskers (who had already clinched the Big 8 title) with a 9–1 finish. On Saturday, November 26, No. 1 Notre Dame went to Los Angeles to hand No. 10 USC a 51–0 shutout loss—the most points scored against USC up to that time, and USC's largest margin of defeat to this day. No. 3 Alabama won over Southern Mississippi in Mobile. No. 5 Georgia Tech lost to No. 7 Georgia 23–14 at Athens. The Bulldogs closed with a 9–1 finish, an unbeaten SEC record (tied with Alabama), and an invitation to the Cotton Bowl to face SWC champion SMU, while Georgia Tech would play Florida in the Orange Bowl. In the final AP Poll, Notre Dame, Michigan State and Alabama were first, second and third, with Georgia at No. 4 and UCLA No. 5. The Coaches Poll also moved the Irish back up to first place after the USC victory. On December 3, No. 3 Alabama closed its season with a 31–0 win over Auburn in Birmingham, for its fourth straight shutout and a 10–0 record; the Crimson Tide prepared to meet No. 6 Nebraska in the Sugar Bowl.

== Conference standings ==
1966 Athletic Association of Western Universities football standings
	Conf.					Overall
Team	W		L		T	W		L		T
USC $	4	–	1	–	0	7	–	4	–	0
No. 5 UCLA	3	–	1	–	0	9	–	1	–	0
Oregon State	3	–	1	–	0	7	–	3	–	0
Washington	4	–	3	–	0	6	–	4	–	0
California	2	–	3	–	0	3	–	7	–	0
Oregon	1	–	3	–	0	3	–	7	–	0
Washington State	1	–	3	–	0	3	–	7	–	0
Stanford	1	–	4	–	0	5	–	5	–	0
$ – Conference champion; Rankings from AP Poll

1966 Atlantic Coast Conference football standings
	Conf.					Overall
Team	W		L		T	W		L		T
Clemson $	6	–	1	–	0	6	–	4	–	0
NC State	5	–	2	–	0	5	–	5	–	0
Maryland	3	–	3	–	0	4	–	6	–	0
Virginia	3	–	3	–	0	4	–	6	–	0
Duke	2	–	3	–	0	5	–	5	–	0
Wake Forest	2	–	4	–	0	3	–	7	–	0
South Carolina	1	–	3	–	0	1	–	9	–	0
North Carolina	1	–	4	–	0	2	–	8	–	0
$ – Conference champion

1966 Big Eight Conference football standings
	Conf.					Overall
Team	W		L		T	W		L		T
No. 6 Nebraska $	6	–	1	–	0	9	–	2	–	0
Colorado	5	–	2	–	0	7	–	3	–	0
Missouri	4	–	2	–	1	6	–	3	–	1
Oklahoma State	4	–	2	–	1	4	–	5	–	1
Oklahoma	4	–	3	–	0	6	–	4	–	0
Iowa State	2	–	3	–	2	2	–	6	–	2
Kansas	0	–	6	–	1	2	–	7	–	1
Kansas State	0	–	6	–	1	0	–	9	–	1
$ – Conference champion; Rankings from AP Poll

1966 Big Sky Conference football standings
	Conf.					Overall
Team	W		L		T	W		L		T
Montana State $^	4	–	0	–	0	8	–	3	–	0
Idaho	3	–	1	–	0	4	–	6	–	0
Weber State	2	–	2	–	0	6	–	3	–	0
Idaho State	1	–	3	–	0	3	–	6	–	0
Montana	0	–	4	–	0	1	–	8	–	0
$ – Conference champion

1966 Big Ten Conference football standings
	Conf.					Overall
Team	W		L		T	W		L		T
No. 2 Michigan State $	7	–	0	–	0	9	–	0	–	1
No. 7 Purdue	6	–	1	–	0	9	–	2	–	0
Michigan	4	–	3	–	0	6	–	4	–	0
Illinois	4	–	3	–	0	4	–	6	–	0
Minnesota	3	–	3	–	1	4	–	5	–	1
Ohio State	3	–	4	–	0	4	–	5	–	0
Northwestern	2	–	4	–	1	3	–	6	–	1
Wisconsin	2	–	4	–	1	3	–	6	–	1
Indiana	1	–	5	–	1	1	–	8	–	1
Iowa	1	–	6	–	0	2	–	8	–	0
$ – Conference champion; Rankings from AP Poll

1966 Ivy League football standings
	Conf.					Overall
Team	W		L		T	W		L		T
Dartmouth +	6	–	1	–	0	7	–	2	–	0
Harvard +	6	–	1	–	0	8	–	1	–	0
Princeton +	6	–	1	–	0	7	–	2	–	0
Cornell	4	–	3	–	0	6	–	3	–	0
Yale	3	–	4	–	0	4	–	5	–	0
Columbia	2	–	5	–	0	2	–	7	–	0
Penn	1	–	6	–	0	2	–	7	–	0
Brown	0	–	7	–	0	1	–	8	–	0
+ – Conference co-champions

1966 Mid-American Conference football standings
	Conf.					Overall
Team	W		L		T	W		L		T
Miami (OH) +	5	–	1	–	0	9	–	1	–	0
Western Michigan +	5	–	1	–	0	7	–	3	–	0
Bowling Green	4	–	2	–	0	6	–	3	–	0
Ohio	3	–	3	–	0	5	–	5	–	0
Kent State	2	–	4	–	0	4	–	6	–	0
Toledo	1	–	5	–	0	2	–	7	–	1
Marshall	1	–	5	–	0	2	–	8	–	0
+ – Conference co-champions

1966 Middle Three Conference football standings
	Conf.					Overall
Team	W		L		T	W		L		T
Rutgers $	2	–	0	–	0	5	–	4	–	0
Lafayette	1	–	1	–	0	3	–	6	–	0
Lehigh	0	–	2	–	0	0	–	9	–	0
$ – Conference champion

1966 Missouri Valley Conference football standings
	Conf.					Overall
Team	W		L		T	W		L		T
North Texas State +	3	–	1	–	0	8	–	2	–	0
Tulsa +	3	–	1	–	0	6	–	4	–	0
Cincinnati	2	–	2	–	0	3	–	7	–	0
Louisville	1	–	3	–	0	6	–	4	–	0
Wichita State	1	–	3	–	0	2	–	8	–	0
+ – Conference co-champions

1966 Southeastern Conference football standings
	Conf.					Overall
Team	W		L		T	W		L		T
No. 3 Alabama +	6	–	0	–	0	11	–	0	–	0
No. 4 Georgia +	6	–	0	–	0	10	–	1	–	0
Florida	5	–	1	–	0	9	–	2	–	0
Ole Miss	5	–	2	–	0	8	–	3	–	0
Tennessee	4	–	2	–	0	8	–	3	–	0
LSU	3	–	3	–	0	5	–	4	–	1
Kentucky	2	–	4	–	0	3	–	6	–	1
Auburn	1	–	5	–	0	4	–	6	–	0
Mississippi State	0	–	6	–	0	2	–	8	–	0
Vanderbilt	0	–	6	–	0	1	–	9	–	0
+ – Conference co-champions; Georgia's game against North Carolina; Florida, LSU, and Vanderbilt's games against Tulane; and Tennessee's game against South Carolina counted in the conference standings.; Rankings from AP Poll

1966 Southern Conference football standings
	Conf.					Overall
Team	W		L		T	W		L		T
East Carolina +	4	–	1	–	1	4	–	5	–	1
William & Mary +	4	–	1	–	1	5	–	4	–	1
West Virginia	3	–	0	–	0	3	–	5	–	2
George Washington	4	–	3	–	0	4	–	6	–	0
Davidson	2	–	3	–	0	4	–	5	–	0
The Citadel	3	–	5	–	0	4	–	6	–	0
Richmond	2	–	4	–	0	2	–	8	–	0
VMI	1	–	3	–	0	2	–	8	–	0
Furman	1	–	4	–	0	3	–	7	–	1
+ – Conference co-champions

1966 Southwest Conference football standings
	Conf.					Overall
Team	W		L		T	W		L		T
No. 10 SMU $	6	–	1	–	0	8	–	3	–	0
Arkansas	5	–	2	–	0	8	–	2	–	0
Texas	5	–	2	–	0	7	–	4	–	0
Texas A&M	4	–	3	–	0	4	–	5	–	1
Baylor	3	–	4	–	0	5	–	5	–	0
Texas Tech	2	–	5	–	0	4	–	6	–	0
TCU	2	–	5	–	0	2	–	8	–	0
Rice	1	–	6	–	0	2	–	8	–	0
$ – Conference champion; Rankings from AP Poll

1966 Western Athletic Conference football standings
	Conf.					Overall
Team	W		L		T	W		L		T
Wyoming $	5	–	0	–	0	10	–	1	–	0
BYU	3	–	2	–	0	8	–	2	–	0
Arizona State	3	–	2	–	0	5	–	5	–	0
Utah	3	–	2	–	0	5	–	5	–	0
Arizona	1	–	4	–	0	3	–	7	–	0
New Mexico	0	–	5	–	0	2	–	8	–	0
$ – Conference champion

1966 NCAA University Division independents football records
	Conf.					Overall
Team	W		L		T	W		L		T
No. 1 Notre Dame		–		–		9	–	0	–	1
Colgate		–		–		8	–	1	–	1
No. 8 Georgia Tech		–		–		9	–	2	–	0
Army		–		–		8	–	2	–	0
Dayton		–		–		8	–	2	–	0
Houston		–		–		8	–	2	–	0
Memphis State		–		–		7	–	2	–	0
No. 9 Miami (FL)		–		–		8	–	2	–	1
Virginia Tech		–		–		8	–	2	–	1
Syracuse		–		–		8	–	3	–	0
Colorado State		–		–		7	–	3	–	0
New Mexico State		–		–		7	–	3	–	0
West Texas State		–		–		7	–	3	–	0
Villanova		–		–		6	–	3	–	0
Holy Cross		–		–		6	–	3	–	1
Southern Miss		–		–		6	–	4	–	0
Texas Western		–		–		6	–	4	–	0
Tulane		–		–		5	–	4	–	1
Florida State		–		–		6	–	5	–	0
Buffalo		–		–		5	–	5	–	0
Penn State		–		–		5	–	5	–	0
Air Force		–		–		4	–	6	–	0
Boston College		–		–		4	–	6	–	0
Navy		–		–		4	–	6	–	0
Utah State		–		–		4	–	6	–	0
Xavier		–		–		4	–	6	–	0
Pacific (CA)		–		–		4	–	7	–	0
San Jose State		–		–		3	–	7	–	0
Pittsburgh		–		–		1	–	9	–	0
Rankings from AP Poll

== Bowl games ==
In the final AP poll, taken before the bowl games, 9–0–1 Notre Dame (which did not end its 40+ year no-bowls policy until the 1969 season) was the overwhelming choice of the writers for the AP Trophy, with 41 of the 56 first place votes, and Michigan State was second; neither played in a bowl game, as Notre Dame at the time refused all bowl bids and Michigan State was barred from the Rose Bowl due to a Big Ten rule that prevented teams from going to the Rose Bowl in two consecutive seasons. Alabama, which was unbeaten and later won the Sugar Bowl over Nebraska, finished third. Georgia, whose only blemish had been a one-point loss to the Miami Hurricanes, was fourth and UCLA was fifth.

=== Major bowls ===
Saturday, December 31, 1966 (Cotton)
Monday, January 2, 1967

BOWL				
COTTON	No. 4 Georgia Bulldogs	24	No. 10 SMU Mustangs	9
SUGAR	No. 3 Alabama Crimson Tide	34	No. 6 Nebraska Cornhuskers	7
ROSE	No. 7 Purdue Boilermakers	14	No. 18 USC Trojans	13
ORANGE	No. 11 Florida Gators	27	No. 8 Georgia Tech Yellowjackets	12

=== Other bowls ===
BOWL	Location	Date	Winner	Score	Runner-up
SUN	El Paso, Texas	December 24	No. 15 Wyoming	28–20	Florida State
GATOR	Jacksonville, Florida	December 31	No. 14 Tennessee	18–12	No. 16 Syracuse
BLUEBONNET	Houston	December 17	Texas	19–0	No. 12 Mississippi
LIBERTY	Memphis, Tennessee	December 10	No. 9 Miami (FL)	14–7	No. 20 Virginia Tech

- Prior to the 1975 season, the Big Ten and Pac-8 (AAWU) conferences allowed only one postseason participant each, for the Rose Bowl.
- Notre Dame did not play in the postseason for 44 consecutive seasons (1925–1968).

== Heisman Trophy voting ==
The Heisman Trophy is given to the year's most outstanding player

Player	School	Position	1st	2nd	3rd	Total
Steve Spurrier	Florida	QB	433	150	80	1,679
Bob Griese	Purdue	QB	184	95	74	816
Nick Eddy	Notre Dame	RB	39	120	99	456
Gary Beban	UCLA	QB	23	76	97	318
Floyd Little	Syracuse	HB	25	70	81	296
Clinton Jones	Michigan State	HB	22	43	52	204
Mel Farr	UCLA	HB	10	29	27	115
Terry Hanratty	Notre Dame	QB	12	23	16	98
Loyd Phillips	Arkansas	DT	13	10	8	67
George Patton	Georgia	DT	1	23	17	66

== See also ==
- 1966 NCAA University Division football rankings
- 1966 College Football All-America Team
- 1966 NCAA College Division football season
- 1966 NAIA football season
