= 1966 Vanderbilt Commodores football team =

American college football season

1966 Vanderbilt Commodores football
- Conference: Southeastern Conference
- Record: 1–9 (0–6 SEC)
- Head coach: John Green (4th season)
- Home stadium: Dudley Field

1966 Southeastern Conference football standings
| | Conf. | | | | | Overall |
| Team | W | | L | | T | W | | L | | T |
|---|---|---|---|---|---|---|---|---|---|---|
| No. 3 Alabama + | 6 | – | 0 | – | 0 | 11 | – | 0 | – | 0 |
| No. 4 Georgia + | 6 | – | 0 | – | 0 | 10 | – | 1 | – | 0 |
| Florida | 5 | – | 1 | – | 0 | 9 | – | 2 | – | 0 |
| Ole Miss | 5 | – | 2 | – | 0 | 8 | – | 3 | – | 0 |
| Tennessee | 4 | – | 2 | – | 0 | 8 | – | 3 | – | 0 |
| LSU | 3 | – | 3 | – | 0 | 5 | – | 4 | – | 1 |
| Kentucky | 2 | – | 4 | – | 0 | 3 | – | 6 | – | 1 |
| Auburn | 1 | – | 5 | – | 0 | 4 | – | 6 | – | 0 |
| Mississippi State | 0 | – | 6 | – | 0 | 2 | – | 8 | – | 0 |
| Vanderbilt | 0 | – | 6 | – | 0 | 1 | – | 9 | – | 0 |
+ – Conference co-champions; Georgia's game against North Carolina; Florida, LSU, and Vanderbilt's games against Tulane; and Tennessee's game against South Carolina counted in the conference standings.; Rankings from AP Poll

The 1966 Vanderbilt Commodores football team represented Vanderbilt University as a member of the Southeastern Conference during the 1966 NCAA University Division football season. Led John Green in his fourth and final season as head coach, the Commodores compiled an overall record of 1–9 with mark of 0–6 in conference, tying for ninth place at the bottom of the SEC standings. Vanderbilt played home games at Dudley Field in Nashville, Tennessee.

== Schedule ==
| Date | Opponent | Site | Result | Attendance | Source |
|---|---|---|---|---|---|
| September 17 | The Citadel* | Dudley Field; Nashville, TN | W 24–0 | 15,327 | |
| September 24 | at Georgia Tech* | Grant Field; Atlanta, GA (rivalry) | L 0–42 | 42,260 | |
| October 1 | Florida | Dudley Field; Nashville, TN | L 0–13 | 16,522 | |
| October 15 | vs. Virginia Tech* | City Stadium; Richmond, VA (Tobacco Bowl) | L 6–21 | 22,000 | |
| October 22 | at No. 4 Alabama | Legion Field; Birmingham, AL | L 6–42 | 56,381 | |
| October 29 | Tulane (Note: Vanderbilt's game against Tulane counted in the SEC standings.) | Dudley Field; Nashville, TN | L 12–13 | 12,614 | |
| November 5 | at Kentucky | McLean Stadium; Lexington, KY (rivalry) | L 10–14 | 15,000 | |
| November 12 | Navy* | Dudley Field; Nashville, TN | L 14–30 | 18,583 | |
| November 19 | at Ole Miss | Mississippi Veterans Memorial Stadium; Jackson, MS (rivalry) | L 0–34 | 10,500 | |
| November 26 | Tennessee | Dudley Field; Nashville, TN (rivalry) | L 0–28 | 26,882 | |
*Non-conference game; Rankings from AP Poll released prior to the game
