= 1966 Auburn Tigers football team =

American college football season

1966 Auburn Tigers football
- Conference: Southeastern Conference
- Record: 4–6 (1–5 SEC)
- Head coach: Ralph Jordan (16th season)
- Home stadium: Cliff Hare Stadium; Legion Field

1966 Southeastern Conference football standings
	Conf.					Overall
Team	W		L		T	W		L		T
No. 3 Alabama +	6	–	0	–	0	11	–	0	–	0
No. 4 Georgia +	6	–	0	–	0	10	–	1	–	0
Florida	5	–	1	–	0	9	–	2	–	0
Ole Miss	5	–	2	–	0	8	–	3	–	0
Tennessee	4	–	2	–	0	8	–	3	–	0
LSU	3	–	3	–	0	5	–	4	–	1
Kentucky	2	–	4	–	0	3	–	6	–	1
Auburn	1	–	5	–	0	4	–	6	–	0
Mississippi State	0	–	6	–	0	2	–	8	–	0
Vanderbilt	0	–	6	–	0	1	–	9	–	0
+ – Conference co-champions; Georgia's game against North Carolina; Florida, LSU, and Vanderbilt's games against Tulane; and Tennessee's game against South Carolina counted in the conference standings.; Rankings from AP Poll

The 1966 Auburn Tigers football team represented Auburn University in the 1966 NCAA University Division football season. It was the Tigers' 75th overall and 33rd season as a member of the Southeastern Conference (SEC). The team was led by head coach Ralph "Shug" Jordan, in his 16th year, and played their home games at Cliff Hare Stadium in Auburn and Legion Field in Birmingham, Alabama. They finished with a record of four wins and six losses (4–6 overall, 1–5 in the SEC).

== Schedule ==
Date	Opponent	Site	TV	Result	Attendance	Source
September 17	Chattanooga*	Cliff Hare Stadium; Auburn, AL		W 20–6	22,808	
September 24	Tennessee	Legion Field; Birmingham, AL		L 0–28	52,582	
October 1	at Kentucky	McLean Stadium; Lexington, KY		L 7–17	37,500	
October 8	Wake Forest*	Cliff Hare Stadium; Auburn, AL		W 14–6	18,511	
October 15	No. 7 Georgia Tech*	Legion Field; Birmingham, AL (rivalry)		L 3–17	48,362	
October 22	TCU*^{†}	Cliff Hare Stadium; Auburn, AL		W 7–6	34,976	
October 29	at No. 7 Florida	Florida Field; Gainesville, FL (rivalry)		L 27–30	58,637–60,511	
November 5	at Mississippi State	Mississippi Veterans Memorial Stadium; Jackson, MS		W 13–0	26,976	
November 12	No. 9 Georgia	Cliff Hare Stadium; Auburn, AL (rivalry)		L 13–21	44,773	
December 3	vs. No. 3 Alabama	Legion Field; Birmingham, AL (Iron Bowl)	ABC	L 0–31	66,808–67,786	
*Non-conference game; ^{†}Homecoming; Rankings from AP Poll released prior to the game
