= 1966 Mississippi State Bulldogs football team =

American college football season

1966 Mississippi State Bulldogs football
- Conference: Southeastern Conference
- Record: 2–8 (0–6 SEC)
- Head coach: Paul E. Davis (5th season)
- Home stadium: Scott Field; Mississippi Veterans Memorial Stadium

1966 Southeastern Conference football standings
	Conf.					Overall
Team	W		L		T	W		L		T
No. 3 Alabama +	6	–	0	–	0	11	–	0	–	0
No. 4 Georgia +	6	–	0	–	0	10	–	1	–	0
Florida	5	–	1	–	0	9	–	2	–	0
Ole Miss	5	–	2	–	0	8	–	3	–	0
Tennessee	4	–	2	–	0	8	–	3	–	0
LSU	3	–	3	–	0	5	–	4	–	1
Kentucky	2	–	4	–	0	3	–	6	–	1
Auburn	1	–	5	–	0	4	–	6	–	0
Mississippi State	0	–	6	–	0	2	–	8	–	0
Vanderbilt	0	–	6	–	0	1	–	9	–	0
+ – Conference co-champions; Georgia's game against North Carolina; Florida, LSU, and Vanderbilt's games against Tulane; and Tennessee's game against South Carolina counted in the conference standings.; Rankings from AP Poll

The 1966 Mississippi State Bulldogs football team was an American football team that represented Mississippi State University as a member of the Southeastern Conference (SEC) during the 1966 NCAA University Division football season. In their fifth year under head coach Paul E. Davis, the Bulldogs compiled an overall record of 2–8, with a mark of 0–6 in conference play, tying for ninth place of the bottom of the SEC standings.

After the season, Davis and athletic director Wade Walker were fired.

== Schedule ==
Date	Opponent	Site	TV	Result	Attendance	Source
September 17	Georgia	Mississippi Veterans Memorial Stadium; Jackson MS		L 17–20	34,000	
September 24	at Florida	Florida Field; Gainesville, FL		L 7–28	49,333	
October 1	Richmond*	Scott Field; Starkville, MS		W 20–0	14,000	
October 8	Southern Miss*	Scott Field; Starkville, MS		W 10–9	23,000	
October 15	at Houston*	Houston Astrodome; Houston, TX		L 0–28	47,870	
October 22	at Florida State*	Doak Campbell Stadium; Tallahassee, FL		L 0–10	30,133	
October 29	at No. 4 Alabama	Denny Stadium; Tuscaloosa, AL (rivalry)		L 14–27	55,215	
November 5	Auburn	Mississippi Veterans Memorial Stadium; Jackson, MS		L 0–13	26,976	
November 12	at LSU	Tiger Stadium; Baton Rouge, LA (rivalry)	ABC	L 7–17	55,000	
November 26	at Ole Miss	Hemingway Stadium; Oxford, MS (Egg Bowl)		L 0–24	30,200	
*Non-conference game; Rankings from AP Poll released prior to the game
