= 1966 Kentucky Wildcats football team =

American college football season

1966 Kentucky Wildcats football
- Conference: Southeastern Conference
- Record: 3–6–1 (2–4 SEC)
- Head coach: Charlie Bradshaw (5th season)
- Home stadium: McLean Stadium

1966 Southeastern Conference football standings
	Conf.					Overall
Team	W		L		T	W		L		T
No. 3 Alabama +	6	–	0	–	0	11	–	0	–	0
No. 4 Georgia +	6	–	0	–	0	10	–	1	–	0
Florida	5	–	1	–	0	9	–	2	–	0
Ole Miss	5	–	2	–	0	8	–	3	–	0
Tennessee	4	–	2	–	0	8	–	3	–	0
LSU	3	–	3	–	0	5	–	4	–	1
Kentucky	2	–	4	–	0	3	–	6	–	1
Auburn	1	–	5	–	0	4	–	6	–	0
Mississippi State	0	–	6	–	0	2	–	8	–	0
Vanderbilt	0	–	6	–	0	1	–	9	–	0
+ – Conference co-champions; Georgia's game against North Carolina; Florida, LSU, and Vanderbilt's games against Tulane; and Tennessee's game against South Carolina counted in the conference standings.; Rankings from AP Poll

The 1966 Kentucky Wildcats football team were an American football team that represented the University of Kentucky as a member of the Southeastern Conference during the 1966 NCAA University Division football season. In their fifth season under head coach Charlie Bradshaw, the team compiled a 3–6–1 record (2–4 in the SEC).

To date, this is the last season in which the Wildcats did not play rival Florida.

== Schedule ==
Date	Opponent	Site	Result	Attendance	Source
September 17	North Carolina*	McLean Stadium; Lexington, KY	W 10–0	37,599	
September 24	at Ole Miss	Mississippi Veterans Memorial Stadium; Jackson, MS	L 0–17	37,000	
October 1	Auburn	McLean Stadium; Lexington, KY	W 17–7	37,500	
October 8	Virginia Tech*	McLean Stadium; Lexington, KY	L 0–7	31,000	
October 15	LSU	McLean Stadium; Lexington, KY	L 0–30	35,000	
October 22	at Georgia	Sanford Stadium; Athens, GA	L 15–27	45,348	
October 29	at West Virginia*	Mountaineer Field; Morgantown, WV	T 14–14	28,000	
November 5	Vanderbilt	McLean Stadium; Lexington, KY (rivalry)	W 14–10	15,000	
November 12	Houston*	McLean Stadium; Lexington, KY	L 18–56	32,000	
November 19	at Tennessee	Neyland Stadium; Knoxville, TN (rivalry)	L 19–28	43,704	
*Non-conference game

== Roster ==
1966 Kentucky Wildcats football team roster
Players
Coaches
Offense

Pos.	#	Name	Class
QB	12	Roger Walz	Sr
QB	14	Terry Beadles	Jr
QB	16	Bob Bartkow	Sr
QB	17	Jim Prather	So
TB	23	Homer Goins	Jr
WB	30	Don Chacos	So
WB	31	Dale McMurry	So
TB	32	Larry Seipel	Sr
WB	38	Bob Windsor	Sr
FB	41	Don Britton	Jr
FB	47	Frank Antonini	Sr
FB	48	Tom Kohl	So
C	51	Bill Cartwright	So
C-G	52	Eddie Ingram	So
C	54	Calvin (Cal) Withrow	Sr
G	60	Mike Beirne	Jr
G	61	Mike Cassity	Jr
G	62	David Childre	So
G	66	Wesley Nails	So
G	67	Louis Wolf	So
OT	71	Bob Friebert	So
OT	72	Jack Gawler	Jr
OT	74	Dennis Drinnen	So
OT	75	Scott Valentine	So
OT	76	Dwight Little	Jr
OT	77	Leonard Rush	So
OE	82	Dan Spanish	Sr
OE	83	Derek Potter	So
OE	84	Tommy Sauer	So
OE	86	Joe David Smith	Sr
FB	91	Don Danko	Sr

Defense

Pos.	#	Name	Class
LB	15	Tom Ferguson	So
DHB	18	Rod Cloyd	So
DHB	20	Charles Vaughn	So
SAF	21	Mike Granato	So
DHB	22	Tom Fee	Jr
DHB	24	Dicky Lyons	So
SAF	25	Jerry Lewis	Jr
SAF	33	Steve Gray	So
DHB	34	Al Phaneuf	So
DHB	35	Phil Greer	So
LB	36	Joe Carroll	Jr
LB	40	Mike McGraw	Sr
LB	42	Kerry Curling	Jr
LB	43	Rodger Hart	Jr
LB	44	Bill Jansen	So
LB	45	George McClellan	Jr
LB	46	Ken Wood	So
LB-C	50	John Harris	So
LB	55	Ronnie Roberts	Jr
DG	63	Doyle King	So
DG	64	Rich Machel	Sr
DG-DT	65	Jim Gresham	Jr
DT	68	Ed Zaremba	So
DG-DT	69	Dick Palmer	So
DT	70	Paul Benard	Jr
DT	73	Marty Joyce	So
DT	78	Basil Mullins	Sr
DT	79	George Katzenbach	So
DE	80	Charles Blackburn	Jr
DE	81	Tom Anderson	So
DE	85	Jim Swart	Sr
DE	87	Doug Van Meter	Jr
DE	88	Jeff Van Note	So
LB	92	Paul Kuhn	So

Special teams

Pos.	#	Name	Class
KS	90	Chuck Arnold	Sr

Head coach

- Charles (Charlie) Bradshaw

Coordinators/assistant coaches

- Ray Callahan – Offensive Interior line coach
- Wally English– Offensive backfield coach
- Leon Fuller – Defensive backfield coach
- Joe Moss – Offensive and defensive interior line coach
- Phil (Duke) Owen –Offensive and defensive backfield coach
- Charley Pell – Defensive interior line coach
- Jim Poynter – Offensive backfield coach
- George Sengel – Offensive ends and line coach
- Doug Shively – Defensive end coach
- Clarence Underwood – Defensive coach

Legend

- (C) Team captain
- (S) Suspended
- (I) Ineligible
- Injured
- Redshirt
