= 1966 LSU Tigers football team =

American college football season

1966 LSU Tigers football
- Conference: Southeastern Conference
- Record: 5–4–1 (3–3 SEC)
- Head coach: Charles McClendon (5th season)
- Home stadium: Tiger Stadium

1966 Southeastern Conference football standings
	Conf.					Overall
Team	W		L		T	W		L		T
No. 3 Alabama +	6	–	0	–	0	11	–	0	–	0
No. 4 Georgia +	6	–	0	–	0	10	–	1	–	0
Florida	5	–	1	–	0	9	–	2	–	0
Ole Miss	5	–	2	–	0	8	–	3	–	0
Tennessee	4	–	2	–	0	8	–	3	–	0
LSU	3	–	3	–	0	5	–	4	–	1
Kentucky	2	–	4	–	0	3	–	6	–	1
Auburn	1	–	5	–	0	4	–	6	–	0
Mississippi State	0	–	6	–	0	2	–	8	–	0
Vanderbilt	0	–	6	–	0	1	–	9	–	0
+ – Conference co-champions; Georgia's game against North Carolina; Florida, LSU, and Vanderbilt's games against Tulane; and Tennessee's game against South Carolina counted in the conference standings.; Rankings from AP Poll

The 1966 LSU Tigers football team represented Louisiana State University (LSU) as a member of the Southeastern Conference (SEC) during the 1966 NCAA University Division football season. Led by fifth-year head coach Charles McClendon, the Tigers compiled an overall record of 5–4–1 with a mark of 3–3 in conference play, placing sixth in the SEC. LSU played home games at Tiger Stadium in Baton Rouge, Louisiana.

== Schedule ==
Date	Time	Opponent	Site	TV	Result	Attendance	Source
September 17	7:30 pm	South Carolina*	Tiger Stadium; Baton Rouge, LA		W 28–12	67,512	
September 24	7:30 pm	at Rice*	Rice Stadium; Houston, TX		L 15–17	63,000	
October 1	7:30 pm	Miami (FL)*	Tiger Stadium; Baton Rouge, LA		W 10–8	67,500	
October 8	7:30 pm	Texas A&M*	Tiger Stadium; Baton Rouge, LA (rivalry)		T 7–7	67,500	
October 15	7:00 pm	at Kentucky	McLean Stadium; Lexington, KY		W 30–0	35,000	
October 22	7:30 pm	No. 8 Florida^{†}	Tiger Stadium; Baton Rouge, LA (rivalry)		L 7–28	67,500	
October 29	7:30 pm	Ole Miss	Tiger Stadium; Baton Rouge, LA (rivalry)		L 0–17	67,500	
November 5	1:15 pm	No. 4 Alabama	Legion Field; Birmingham, AL (rivalry)	ABC	L 0–21	66,513	
November 12	1:15 pm	Mississippi State	Tiger Stadium; Baton Rouge, LA (rivalry)	ABC	W 17–7	55,000	
November 19	7:30 pm	at Tulane (Note: The game against Tulane was designated as a conference game by the SEC, even though the Green Wave exited the league prior to the 1966 season.)	Tulane Stadium; New Orleans, LA (Battle for the Rag)		W 21–7	82,307	
*Non-conference game; ^{†}Homecoming; Rankings from AP Poll released prior to the game
