= 1966 Tennessee Volunteers football team =

American college football season

1966 Tennessee Volunteers football

Gator Bowl champion

Gator Bowl, W 18–12 vs. Syracuse
- Conference: Southeastern Conference

Ranking
- Coaches: No. 14
- Record: 8–3 (4–2 SEC)
- Head coach: Doug Dickey (3rd season)
- Home stadium: Neyland Stadium

1966 Southeastern Conference football standings
	Conf.					Overall
Team	W		L		T	W		L		T
No. 3 Alabama +	6	–	0	–	0	11	–	0	–	0
No. 4 Georgia +	6	–	0	–	0	10	–	1	–	0
Florida	5	–	1	–	0	9	–	2	–	0
Ole Miss	5	–	2	–	0	8	–	3	–	0
Tennessee	4	–	2	–	0	8	–	3	–	0
LSU	3	–	3	–	0	5	–	4	–	1
Kentucky	2	–	4	–	0	3	–	6	–	1
Auburn	1	–	5	–	0	4	–	6	–	0
Mississippi State	0	–	6	–	0	2	–	8	–	0
Vanderbilt	0	–	6	–	0	1	–	9	–	0
+ – Conference co-champions; Georgia's game against North Carolina; Florida, LSU, and Vanderbilt's games against Tulane; and Tennessee's game against South Carolina counted in the conference standings.; Rankings from AP Poll

The 1966 Tennessee Volunteers football team (variously "Tennessee", "UT" or the "Vols") represented the University of Tennessee as a member of the Southeastern Conference (SEC) during the 1966 NCAA University Division football season. Led by third-year head coach Doug Dickey, the Volunteers compiled an overall record of 8–3 with a mark of 4–2 in conference play, placing fifth in the SEC. Tennessee was invited to the Gator Bowl, where the Volunteers defeated Syracuse. The team played home games at Neyland Stadium in Knoxville, Tennessee.

== Schedule ==
Date	Opponent	Rank	Site	TV	Result	Attendance	Source
September 24	at Auburn		Legion Field; Birmingham, AL (rivalry)		W 28–0	52,582	
October 1	Rice*	No. 10	Neyland Stadium; Knoxville, TN		W 23–3	44,053	
October 8	at No. 9 Georgia Tech*	No. 8	Grant Field; Atlanta, GA (rivalry)	ABC	L 3–6	52,180	
October 15	No. 3 Alabama		Neyland Stadium; Knoxville, TN (Third Saturday in October)		L 10–11	56,463	
October 22	South Carolina (Note: Tennessee's game against South Carolina counted in the SEC standings.)		Neyland Stadium; Knoxville, TN (rivalry)		W 29–17	38,944	
October 29	vs. Army*		Memphis Memorial Stadium; Memphis, TN		W 38–7	48,646	
November 5	Chattanooga*	No. 10	Neyland Stadium; Knoxville, TN		W 28–10	34,551	
November 12	Ole Miss^{†}	No. 10	Neyland Stadium; Knoxville, TN (rivalry)		L 7–14	55,206	
November 19	Kentucky		Neyland Stadium; Knoxville, TN (rivalry)	ABC	W 28–19	43,704	
November 26	at Vanderbilt		Dudley Field; Nashville, TN (rivalry)		W 28–0	26,882	
December 31	vs. Syracuse*		Gator Bowl Stadium; Jacksonville, FL (Gator Bowl)	ABC	W 18–12	60,312	
*Non-conference game; ^{†}Homecoming; Rankings from AP Poll released prior to the game

== Personnel ==
1966 Tennessee Volunteers football team roster
Players
Coaches
Offense

Pos.	#	Name	Class
TE		Austin Denney
QB	16	Dewey Warren	Jr

Defense

Pos.	#	Name	Class

Special teams

Pos.	#	Name	Class

Head coach

- Doug Dickey

Coordinators/assistant coaches

Legend

- (C) Team captain
- (S) Suspended
- (I) Ineligible
- Injured
- Redshirt

== Team players drafted into the NFL ==
Player	Position	Round	Pick	NFL club
Paul Naumoff	Linebacker	3	60	Detroit Lions
Ron Widby	Punter	4	81	New Orleans Saints
John Mills	End	8	199	San Diego Chargers
Harold Stancell	Defensive back	9	231	Philadelphia Eagles
Doug Archibald	Defensive back	16	405	New York Jets
