= 1966 Ole Miss Rebels football team =

American college football season

1966 Ole Miss Rebels football

Bluebonnet Bowl, L 0–19 vs. Texas
- Conference: Southeastern Conference

Ranking
- Coaches: No. 12
- Record: 8–3 (5–2 SEC)
- Head coach: Johnny Vaught (20th season)
- Home stadium: Hemingway Stadium; Mississippi Veterans Memorial Stadium

1966 Southeastern Conference football standings
	Conf.					Overall
Team	W		L		T	W		L		T
No. 3 Alabama +	6	–	0	–	0	11	–	0	–	0
No. 4 Georgia +	6	–	0	–	0	10	–	1	–	0
Florida	5	–	1	–	0	9	–	2	–	0
Ole Miss	5	–	2	–	0	8	–	3	–	0
Tennessee	4	–	2	–	0	8	–	3	–	0
LSU	3	–	3	–	0	5	–	4	–	1
Kentucky	2	–	4	–	0	3	–	6	–	1
Auburn	1	–	5	–	0	4	–	6	–	0
Mississippi State	0	–	6	–	0	2	–	8	–	0
Vanderbilt	0	–	6	–	0	1	–	9	–	0
+ – Conference co-champions; Georgia's game against North Carolina; Florida, LSU, and Vanderbilt's games against Tulane; and Tennessee's game against South Carolina counted in the conference standings.; Rankings from AP Poll

The 1966 Ole Miss Rebels football team represented the University of Mississippi during the 1966 NCAA University Division football season. The Rebels were led by 20th-year head coach Johnny Vaught and played their home games at Hemingway Stadium in Oxford, Mississippi and Mississippi Veterans Memorial Stadium in Jackson. The team competed as members of the Southeastern Conference, finishing in fourth. After starting 2–2 on the year, the Rebels began a six-game winning streak with a come-from-behind victory over upset-minded Southern Miss on homecoming. Ole Miss ended the regular season at 8–2, and were ranked 12th in the final Coaches Poll, which was conducted before bowl season. The AP Poll ranked only ten teams at the time. The Rebels were invited to the 1966 Bluebonnet Bowl, where they were shutout by Texas, 0–19.

== Schedule ==
Date	Opponent	Site	TV	Result	Attendance	Source
September 17	at Memphis State*	Memphis Memorial Stadium; Memphis, TN (rivalry)		W 13–0	50,164	
September 24	Kentucky	Mississippi Veterans Memorial Stadium; Jackson, MS		W 17–0	37,000	
October 1	No. 3 Alabama	Mississippi Veterans Memorial Stadium; Jackson, MS (rivalry)		L 7–17	46,703	
October 8	at Georgia	Sanford Stadium; Athens, GA		L 3–9	45,200	
October 15	Southern Miss*^{†}	Hemingway Stadium; Oxford, MS		W 14–7	25,000	
October 22	vs. Houston*	Memphis Memorial Stadium; Memphis, TN		W 27–6	14,118	
October 29	at LSU	Tiger Stadium; Baton Rouge, LA (rivalry)		W 17–0	67,500	
November 12	at No. 10 Tennessee	Neyland Stadium; Knoxville, TN (rivalry)		W 14–7	55,206	
November 19	Vanderbilt	Mississippi Veterans Memorial Stadium; Jackson, MS (rivalry)		W 34–0	10,500	
November 26	Mississippi State	Hemingway Stadium; Oxford, MS (Egg Bowl)		W 24–0	30,200	
December 17	vs. Texas*	Rice Stadium; Houston, TX (Bluebonnet Bowl)	ABC	L 0–19	67,000	
*Non-conference game; ^{†}Homecoming; Rankings from AP Poll released prior to the game
