= 1966 Alabama Crimson Tide football team =

American college football season

1966 Alabama Crimson Tide football

National champion (Berryman/Sagarin/Calhoun) SEC co-champion Sugar Bowl champion

Sugar Bowl, W 34–7 vs. Nebraska
- Conference: Southeastern Conference

Ranking
- Coaches: No. 3
- AP: No. 3
- Record: 11–0 (6–0 SEC)
- Head coach: Bear Bryant (9th season)
- Captains: Ray Perkins; Richard Cole
- Home stadium: Denny Stadium; Legion Field; Ladd Stadium

1966 Southeastern Conference football standings
| | Conf. | | | | | Overall |
| Team | W | | L | | T | W | | L | | T |
|---|---|---|---|---|---|---|---|---|---|---|
| No. 3 Alabama + | 6 | – | 0 | – | 0 | 11 | – | 0 | – | 0 |
| No. 4 Georgia + | 6 | – | 0 | – | 0 | 10 | – | 1 | – | 0 |
| Florida | 5 | – | 1 | – | 0 | 9 | – | 2 | – | 0 |
| Ole Miss | 5 | – | 2 | – | 0 | 8 | – | 3 | – | 0 |
| Tennessee | 4 | – | 2 | – | 0 | 8 | – | 3 | – | 0 |
| LSU | 3 | – | 3 | – | 0 | 5 | – | 4 | – | 1 |
| Kentucky | 2 | – | 4 | – | 0 | 3 | – | 6 | – | 1 |
| Auburn | 1 | – | 5 | – | 0 | 4 | – | 6 | – | 0 |
| Mississippi State | 0 | – | 6 | – | 0 | 2 | – | 8 | – | 0 |
| Vanderbilt | 0 | – | 6 | – | 0 | 1 | – | 9 | – | 0 |
+ – Conference co-champions; Georgia's game against North Carolina; Florida, LSU, and Vanderbilt's games against Tulane; and Tennessee's game against South Carolina counted in the conference standings.; Rankings from AP Poll

The 1966 Alabama Crimson Tide football team represented the University of Alabama in the 1966 NCAA University Division football season. It was the Crimson Tide's 72nd overall and 33rd season as a member of the Southeastern Conference (SEC). The team was led by head coach Bear Bryant, in his ninth year, and played their home games at Denny Stadium in Tuscaloosa, Legion Field in Birmingham and Ladd Stadium in Mobile, Alabama. They finished season undefeated with eleven wins (11–0 overall, 6–0 in the SEC), as SEC co-champions and with a victory over Nebraska in the Sugar Bowl.

Alabama opened the season with a victory over Louisiana Tech in Birmingham and followed that with a victory at Ole Miss for their first conference win of the season. The Crimson Tide then returned home and defeated Clemson in the first Tuscaloosa game of the season before they traveled to Knoxville for their annual rival game against Tennessee. In the game, Alabama trailed the Volunteers 10–0 in the fourth quarter before they rallied for an 11–10 victory that saw Tennessee miss a game-winning field goal in the final minute of play.

Alabama then alternated home games between Birmingham and Tuscaloosa over the next four weeks and defeated Vanderbilt, Mississippi State, LSU and South Carolina in each game. After they defeated Southern Miss in their annual Mobile game, the Crimson Tide defeated Auburn in the Iron Bowl and captured a share of the SEC championship. In the January that followed, Alabama then defeated Nebraska in the Sugar Bowl and finished the season undefeated. Although they were the only undefeated and untied college team at the conclusion of the year, Alabama was not selected as national champions for the season. On the 1966 squad, Green Bay Packers head coach Vince Lombardi stated: "I don't know, we haven't played Alabama yet" when asked how it felt to have the world's greatest football team for the season after his Packers won Super Bowl I.

== Schedule ==
| Date | Opponent | Rank | Site | TV | Result | Attendance | Source |
|---|---|---|---|---|---|---|---|
| September 24 | Louisiana Tech* | No. 3 | Legion Field; Birmingham, AL | | W 34–0 | 63,187 | |
| October 1 | at Ole Miss | No. 3 | Mississippi Veterans Memorial Stadium; Jackson, MS (rivalry) | | W 17–7 | 46,703 | |
| October 8 | Clemson* | No. 4 | Denny Stadium; Tuscaloosa, AL (rivalry) | | W 26–0 | 46,486 | |
| October 15 | at Tennessee | No. 3 | Neyland Stadium; Knoxville, TN (Third Saturday in October) | | W 11–10 | 56,463 | |
| October 22 | Vanderbilt | No. 4 | Legion Field; Birmingham, AL | | W 42–6 | 56,381 | |
| October 29 | Mississippi State | No. 4 | Denny Stadium; Tuscaloosa, AL (rivalry) | | W 27–14 | 55,215 | |
| November 5 | LSU | No. 4 | Legion Field; Birmingham, AL (rivalry) | ABC | W 21–0 | 66,513 | |
| November 12 | South Carolina*^{†} | No. 3 | Denny Stadium; Tuscaloosa, AL | | W 24–0 | 57,282 | |
| November 26 | Southern Miss* | No. 3 | Ladd Stadium; Mobile, AL | | W 34–0 | 41,010 | |
| December 3 | vs. Auburn | No. 3 | Legion Field; Birmingham, AL (Iron Bowl) | ABC | W 31–0 | 67,786 | |
| January 2, 1967 | vs. No. 6 Nebraska* | No. 3 | Tulane Stadium; New Orleans, LA (Sugar Bowl) | NBC | W 34–7 | 82,000 | |
*Non-conference game; ^{†}Homecoming; Rankings from AP Poll released prior to the game; Source:

== Before the season ==
Alabama was recognized as national champions from the Associated Press for the 1965 season after they defeated Nebraska in the Orange Bowl and finished with an overall record of 9–1–1. In February 1966, SEC commissioner Bernie Moore penalized Alabama for scholarship violations with its freshman squad. Moore found that Alabama awarded 42 freshman scholarships instead of the 40 allowed by the league. As such, the Crimson Tide were penalized with a scholarship reduction of two to 38 for the 1966 recruiting class.

== Game summaries ==
=== Louisiana Tech ===
| Team | 1 | 2 | 3 | 4 | Total |
|---|---|---|---|---|---|
| Louisiana Tech | 0 | 0 | 0 | 0 | 0 |
| • #3 Alabama | 0 | 14 | 7 | 13 | 34 |

- Date: September 24
- Location: Legion Field
  Birmingham, Alabama
- Game attendance: 63,187

To open the 1966 season, the No. 3 Crimson Tide defeated the Louisiana Tech Bulldogs 34–0 in the first all-time meeting between the schools on the football field. After a scoreless first quarter, Alabama took a 14–0 halftime lead on a 32-yard Ken Stabler touchdown pass to Dennis Homan and on an eight-yard Stabler touchdown run. After a two-yard Harold Moore touchdown run in the third, the Crimson Tide made the final score 34–0 in the fourth after they scored on a 79-yad Stabler pass to Homan and on a four-yard Moore run.

=== Ole Miss ===
| Team | 1 | 2 | 3 | 4 | Total |
|---|---|---|---|---|---|
| • #3 Alabama | 0 | 7 | 7 | 3 | 17 |
| Ole Miss | 0 | 0 | 0 | 7 | 7 |

- Date: October 1
- Location: Mississippi Veterans Memorial Stadium
  Jackson, Mississippi
- Game attendance: 46,703

Prior to their game against Ole Miss, Alabama retained the No. 3 position in the AP Poll, and on a Saturday evening, the Crimson Tide defeated the Rebels 17–7 at Jackson. After a scoreless first quarter, Alabama took a 7–0 halftime lead when Leslie Kelley scored on a one-yard touchdown run with only 0:40 left in the quarter. The Crimson Tide then extended their lead further to 14–0 in the third quarter when Ken Stabler threw a 28-yard touchdown pass to Ray Perkins. The Rebels responded early in the fourth and cut the Crimson Tide lead in half when Julian Cunningham scored on a two-yard touchdown run, and then Alabama closed the game with a 21-yard Steve Davis field goal that made the final score 17–7.

=== Clemson ===
| Team | 1 | 2 | 3 | 4 | Total |
|---|---|---|---|---|---|
| Clemson | 0 | 0 | 0 | 0 | 0 |
| • #4 Alabama | 6 | 10 | 7 | 3 | 26 |

- Date: October 8
- Location: Denny Stadium
  Tuscaloosa, Alabama
- Game attendance: 46,486

After their closer-than-expected victory over Ole Miss, Alabama dropped into the No. 4 position in the AP Poll prior to their game against Clemson. In what was their first game against the Tigers since the 1936 season, who were led by former Crimson Tide player Frank Howard as head coach, Alabama won 26–0. The Crimson Tide took a 6–0 first quarter lead when Ken Stabler threw an eight-yard touchdown pass to Dennis Homan. They then extended their lead to 16–0 at halftime after a 32-yard Steve Davis field goal and one-yard Stabler touchdown run in the second quarter. Alabama then closed the game with an eight-yard Stabler touchdown pass to Kenny Martin in the third and a 36-yard Davies field goal in the fourth quarter that made the final score 26–0.

=== Tennessee ===
Third Saturday in October

| Team | 1 | 2 | 3 | 4 | Total |
|---|---|---|---|---|---|
| • #3 Alabama | 0 | 0 | 0 | 11 | 11 |
| Tennessee | 10 | 0 | 0 | 0 | 10 |

- Date: October 15
- Location: Neyland Stadium
  Knoxville, Tennessee
- Game attendance: 56,463

Scoring summary
| Q1 | | TENN | Denney 6 yard pass from Warren (Wright kick) | TENN 7–0 |
| Q1 | | TENN | Wright 40 yard field goal | TENN 10–0 |
| Q4 | | ALA | Stabler 1 yard run (Cook pass from Stabler) | TENN 10–8 |
| Q4 | 3:23 | ALA | Davis 17 yard field goal | ALA 11–10 |

After their victory over Clemson, Alabama regained the No. 3 position in the AP Poll prior to their game against Tennessee. At a rain-soaked Neyland Stadium, Alabama overcame a 10–0 fourth quarter deficit and defeated the rival Volunteers 11–10 and preserved their perfect record. Tennessee scored all of their points in the first quarter. The first points came on a six-yard Dewey Warren touchdown pass to Austin Denney and next on a 40-yard Gary Wright field goal for a 10–0 lead. Still up by 10, the Crimson Tide made their comeback in the fourth quarter. Ken Stabler scored on a one-yard touchdown run and then successfully converted the two-point conversion on a short pass to Wayne Cook that made the score 10–8. With 3:23 left in the game, Steve Davis kicked the 17-yard, game-winning field goal that made the score 11–10. The Volunteers did manage to set up a 19-yard field goal attempt that went wide in the final 0:20 of the contest.

=== Vanderbilt ===
| Team | 1 | 2 | 3 | 4 | Total |
|---|---|---|---|---|---|
| Vanderbilt | 6 | 0 | 0 | 0 | 6 |
| • #4 Alabama | 21 | 7 | 14 | 0 | 42 |

- Date: October 22
- Location: Legion Field
  Birmingham, Alabama
- Game attendance: 56,381

After their victory over Tennessee, Alabama again dropped into the No. 4 position in the AP Poll prior to their game against Vanderbilt. Against the Commodores, Alabama played 56 different players in their 42–6 victory at Birmingham. The Crimson Tide took a 21–0 first quarter lead before Vanderbilt scored their only points of the game. Alabama touchdowns were scored by Bobby Johns on a 40-yard interception return, a 29-yard Leslie Kelley pass to Ray Perkins on a halfback option play and on a 35-yard Wayne Trimble pass to Richard Brewer. The Commodores responded with their only points on a three-yard Roger May touchdown pass to Steve Skupas late in the first. A 14-yard David Chatwood touchdown run in the second quarter made the halftime score 28–6 in favor of Alabama. The Crimson Tide then closed the game with a pair of third-quarter touchdowns on an 18-yard Trimble pass to Dennis Homan and on a one-yard Trimble run.

=== Mississippi State ===
| Team | 1 | 2 | 3 | 4 | Total |
|---|---|---|---|---|---|
| Mississippi State | 0 | 0 | 0 | 14 | 14 |
| • #4 Alabama | 0 | 10 | 3 | 14 | 27 |

- Date: October 29
- Location: Denny Stadium
  Tuscaloosa, Alabama
- Game attendance: 55,215

At Denny Stadium, the Crimson Tide traded touchdowns in the fourth quarter and defeated the Mississippi State Bulldogs 27–14 in Tuscaloosa. After a scoreless first quarter, Alabama took a 10–0 halftime lead after a 35-yard Steve Davis field goal and a 26-yard Wayne Trimble touchdown pass to Ray Perkins. Davis then added a 31-yard field goal in the third before both teams traded touchdowns in the fourth quarter and made the final score 27–14. In the final quarter, the Crimson Tide scored on Trimble touchdown passes of 48-yards to Jerry Duncan and 38-yards to Perkins; Mississippi State scored on a three-yard Prentis Calhoun run and on an 11-yard Don Saget pass to Calhoun.

=== LSU ===
| Team | 1 | 2 | 3 | 4 | Total |
|---|---|---|---|---|---|
| LSU | 0 | 0 | 0 | 0 | 0 |
| • #4 Alabama | 5 | 3 | 7 | 6 | 21 |

- Date: November 5
- Location: Legion Field
  Birmingham, Alabama
- Game attendance: 66,513

After their victory over Mississippi State, Alabama retained the No. 4 position in the AP Poll prior to their game against LSU. Behind a strong defensive performance, the Crimson Tide defeated the Tigers 21–0 at Legion Field. Alabama took a 5–0 first quarter lead after Mike Hall blocked a Mitch Worley punt for a safety and Steve Davis connected on a 24-yard field goal. Davis then made the halftime score 8–0 in favor of the Crimson Tide with a 32-yard field goal. In the third quarter, Bobby Johns intercepted a Fred Haynes pass and returned it 33-yards for a touchdown and in the fourth a three-yard Frank Canterbury touchdown run made the final score 21–0.

=== South Carolina ===
| Team | 1 | 2 | 3 | 4 | Total |
|---|---|---|---|---|---|
| South Carolina | 0 | 0 | 0 | 0 | 0 |
| • #3 Alabama | 7 | 7 | 7 | 3 | 24 |

- Date: November 12
- Location: Denny Stadium
  Tuscaloosa, Alabama
- Game attendance: 57,282

On homecoming in Tuscaloosa, Alabama defeated the South Carolina Gamecocks 24–0 at Denny Stadium. The Crimson Tide took a 14–0 halftime lead after touchdown runs of one-yard by David Chatwood in the first and of three-yards by Leslie Kelley in the second quarter. Alabama then closed the game with a 13-yard Wayne Trimble touchdown pass to Ray Perkins in the third and on a 31-yard Steve Davis field goal in the fourth that made the final score 24–0.

=== Southern Miss ===
| Team | 1 | 2 | 3 | 4 | Total |
|---|---|---|---|---|---|
| Southern Miss | 0 | 0 | 0 | 0 | 0 |
| • #3 Alabama | 0 | 12 | 6 | 16 | 34 |

- Date: November 26
- Location: Ladd Stadium
  Mobile, Alabama
- Game attendance: 36,166

In their annual game played at Mobile, Alabama shutout the Southern Miss Southerners 34–0 at Ladd Stadium. After a scoreless first, the Crimson Tide took a 12–0 halftime lead on a pair of Ken Stabler touchdown passes. The first was from 25-yards to Ray Perkins and the second from one-yard out to Wayne Cook. After a 13-yard David Chatwood touchdown run in the third, Alabama then closed the game with a pair of touchdowns and two-point conversions in the fourth quarter. The first came on a 55-yard Stabler touchdown pass to Dennis Homan and the second on a one-yard Joe Kelley run that made the final score 34–0.

=== Auburn ===
Iron Bowl

| Team | 1 | 2 | 3 | 4 | Total |
|---|---|---|---|---|---|
| Auburn | 0 | 0 | 0 | 0 | 0 |
| • #3 Alabama | 0 | 17 | 14 | 0 | 31 |

- Date: December 3
- Location: Legion Field
  Birmingham, Alabama
- Game attendance: 67,786

In the annual Iron Bowl game, Alabama defeated the Auburn Tigers 31–0 and secured their third consecutive SEC championship. After a scoreless first quarter, the Crimson Tide took a 17–0 halftime lead with points scored on a 63-yard Ken Stabler touchdown pass to Ray Perkins, on a one-yard Leslie Kelley run and on a 23-yard Steve Davis field goal. Alabama then concluded their scoring with a pair of third-quarter touchdowns on a 12-yard Kelley run and on a 41-yard Wayne Trimble pass to Donnie Sutton that made the final score 31–0.

=== Nebraska ===
Sugar Bowl

| Team | 1 | 2 | 3 | 4 | Total |
|---|---|---|---|---|---|
| #6 Nebraska | 0 | 0 | 0 | 7 | 7 |
| • #3 Alabama | 17 | 7 | 3 | 7 | 34 |

- Date: January 2, 1967
- Location: Tulane Stadium
  New Orleans, Louisiana
- Game attendance: 82,000

For the second year in a row, Alabama played Nebraska in their bowl game, and for the second consecutive year defeated the Cornhuskers. In the 1967 edition of the Sugar Bowl, the Crimson Tide defeated Nebraska 34–7 and finished the season undefeated. Alabama opened with a 17–0 lead in the first quarter on touchdown runs of one-yard by Leslie Kelley, 14-yards by Ken Stabler and on a 30-yard Steve Davis field goal. They then extended it to 24–0 at halftime after a six-yard Wayne Trimble touchdown run in the second quarter. After a 40-yard Davis field goal in the third for the Crimson Tide, Nebraska scored their only points early in the fourth quarter on a 15-yard Bob Churchich touchdown pass to Dick Davis that made the score 27–7. Alabama then closed the game with a 45-yard Stabler touchdown pass to Ray Perkins that made the final score 34–7. For his performance, Stabler was recognized as the game's MVP.

== National championship claim ==
The NCAA recognizes consensus national champions as the teams that have captured a championship by way of one of the major polls since the 1950 NCAA University Division football season. Although Alabama was the only team with a perfect record at the end of the season as Notre Dame and Michigan State tied in their meeting, it was not recognized as national champion. Keith Dunnavant suggests in his book about the 1966 season, that the continued segregation of the Alabama football team (the Crimson Tide did not integrate until Wilbur Jackson and John Mitchell made the 1971 team), as well as the Birmingham campaign and Selma to Montgomery marches by white Alabamians during the Civil Rights Movement, cost the Crimson Tide support with voters in 1966 and led to the third-place finish. The 1966 squad was retroactively recognized as national champion by Berryman and Sagarin (ELO-Chess) but Alabama does not claim either in their official national championship total.

== Freshman squad ==
Prior to the 1972 NCAA University Division football season, NCAA rules prohibited freshmen from participating on the varsity team, and as such many schools fielded freshmen teams. The Alabama freshmen squad was led by coach Clem Gryska for the 1966 season and finished with a record of four wins and zero losses (4–0). The Baby Tide opened their season with a 27–14 victory over Mississippi State at Denny Stadium. After a scoreless first quarter, Alabama took a 7–0 lead in the second when Scott Hunter threw a five-yard touchdown pass to Tommy Wade. They then extended their lead to 17–0 at halftime when Mike Dean connected on a 46-yard field goal and Hunter scored on a short quarterback sneak. After Dean connected on a 31-yard field goal late in the third, the Bulldogs scored their first points late in the fourth on a 43-yard Dickie Carpenter touchdown run that made the score 20–7. Alabama responded with a 13-yard Wade touchdown run and State with a 13-yard Carpenter touchdown pass to George Davis that made the final score 27–14.

In their second game of the season, the Alabama freshmen defeated Ole Miss 31–14 at Oxford. Alabama took a 14–7 halftime lead with a pair of Tommy Wade touchdown runs from one and three-yards; Ole Miss scored their touchdown on a four-yard John Bowen run. After Mike Dean connected on a 25-yard field goal in the third, fourth-quarter touchdowns were scored for Alabama by Wade on a one-yard run and on a 20-yard Scott Hunter pass to Dean. The Rebels scored their final touchdown on a 40-yard Vernon Studdard pass to Louis Farber that made the final score 31–14. In their next game on November 7 against Tennessee, the Baby Tide won again by a score of 21–9. The Vols led 9–7 at halftime after Vic Dingus tackled Eddie Bentley in the endzone for a safety and on a 35-yard Mike Jones touchdown pass to Gary Kreis. Alabama's first half touchdown came on a 15-yard Tommy Wade run. The Baby Tide closed the game with touchdowns on a 13-yard Scott Hunter pass to Perry Willis in the third and on a two-yard Wade run in the fourth that made the final score 21–9.

In their final game of the season, Alabama defeated Auburn 6–3 at Denny Stadium and finished the season undefeated. After Joe Riley scored Auburn's only points with his 35-yard field goal in the first, Mike Dean scored all of the Tide's points with field goals of 20 and 31-yards.

== Personnel ==
=== Varsity letter winners ===
| Player | Hometown | Position |
|---|---|---|
| Randy Barron | Dadeville, Alabama | Defensive tackle |
| Dickie Bean | Childersburg, Alabama | Halfback |
| David Bedwell | Cedar Bluff, Alabama | Defensive back |
| Richard Brewer | Sylacauga, Alabama | Split end |
| John Calvert | Cullman, Alabama | Guard |
| Frank Canterbury | Birmingham, Alabama | Halfback |
| Jimmy Carroll | Enterprise, Alabama | Center |
| David Chatwood | Fairhope, Alabama | Fullback |
| Bob Childs | Montgomery, Alabama | Linebacker |
| Richard Cole | Crossville, Alabama | Defensive tackle |
| Wayne Cook | Montgomery, Alabama | Tight end |
| Steve Davis | Columbus, Georgia | Placekicker |
| Cecil Dowdy | Cherokee, Alabama | Offensive tackle |
| Jerry Duncan | Sparta, North Carolina | Offensive tackle |
| Mike Ford | Tuscaloosa, Alabama | Defensive end |
| Conrad Fowler | Columbiana, Alabama | Split end |
| Jim Fuller | Fairfield, Alabama | Tackle |
| Mike Hall | Tarrant, Alabama | Linebacker |
| Allen Harpole | Columbus, Mississippi | Defensive guard |
| Charles Harris | Mobile, Alabama | Defensive end |
| Dennis Homan | Muscle Shoals, Alabama | Split end |
| Jimmy Israel | Haleyville, Alabama | Quarterback |
| Bobby Johns | Birmingham, Alabama | Defensive back |
| Billy Johnson | Selma, Alabama | Center |
| Donny Johnston | Birmingham, Alabama | Halfback |
| Joe Kelley | Ozark, Alabama | Quarterback |
| Leslie Kelley | Cullman, Alabama | Fullback |
| Dudley Kerr | Reform, Alabama | Placekicker |
| Terry Killgore | Annandale, Virginia | Center |
| Kenny Martin | Hemet, California | Fullback |
| Harold Moore | Chattanooga, Tennessee | Fullback |
| Ed Morgan | Hattiesburg, Mississippi | Fullback |
| John Mosley | Thomaston, Alabama | Halfback |
| Stan Moss | Birmingham, Alabama | Left end |
| Wayne Owen | Gadsden, Alabama | Linebacker |
| Ray Perkins | Petal, Mississippi | End |
| Eddie Propst | Birmingham, Alabama | Defensive back |
| Gene Raburn | Jasper, Alabama | Fullback |
| Mike Reilly | Mobile, Alabama | Guard |
| John Reitz | Morristown, Tennessee | Defensive end |
| Eddie Rogers | Bessemer, Alabama | Linebacker |
| Nathan Rustin | Phenix City, Alabama | Defensive tackle |
| Mike Sasser | Brewton, Alabama | Defensive back |
| John Sides | Tuskegee, Alabama | Defensive tackle |
| Tom Somerville | White Station, Tennessee | Offensive guard |
| Ken Stabler | Foley, Alabama | Quarterback |
| Bruce Stephens | Thomasville, Alabama | Guard |
| Wayne Stevens | Gadsden, Alabama | End |
| Johnny Sullivan | Nashville, Tennessee | Defensive tackle |
| Donnie Sutton | Blountsville, Alabama | Split end |
| Louis Thompson | Lebanon, Tennessee | Defensive tackle |
| Richard Thompson | Thomasville, Alabama | Halfback |
| Wayne Trimble | Cullman, Alabama | Quarterback |
| Frank Whaley | Lineville, Alabama | Defensive end |
| John Williams | Decatur, Alabama | Guard |

=== Coaching staff ===
| Name | Position | Seasons at Alabama | Alma mater |
|---|---|---|---|
| Bear Bryant | Head coach | 9 | Alabama (1936) |
| Sam Bailey | Assistant coach | 9 | Ouachita Baptist (1949) |
| Ken Donahue | Assistant coach | 3 | Tennessee (1951) |
| Pat Dye | Assistant coach | 2 | Georgia (1962) |
| Jim Goostree | Assistant coach | 10 | Tennessee (1952) |
| Clem Gryska | Assistant coach | 7 | Alabama (1948) |
| Dude Hennessey | Assistant coach | 7 | Kentucky (1955) |
| Carney Laslie | Assistant coach | 10 | Alabama (1934) |
| Ken Meyer | Assistant coach | 4 | Denison (1950) |
| Mal Moore | Assistant coach | 3 | Alabama (1962) |
| Dee Powell | Assistant coach | 4 | Texas A&M (1957) |
| Charley Richards | Assistant coach | 1 | Livingston State (1950) |
| Hayden Riley | Assistant coach | 9 | Alabama (1948) |
| Tom Rogers | Assistant coach | 1 | Delta State (1956) |
| Jack Rutledge | Assistant coach | 1 | Alabama (1962) |
| Jimmy Sharpe | Assistant coach | 4 | Alabama (1962) |
| Richard Williamson | Assistant coach | 3 | Alabama (1963) |

== NFL draft ==
Several players that were varsity lettermen from the 1966 squad were drafted into the National Football League (NFL) between the 1967 and 1969 drafts. These players included the following:

| Year | Round | Overall | Player name | Position | NFL team |
|---|---|---|---|---|---|
| 1967 NFL/AFL draft | 1 | 26 | Leslie Kelley | Running back Linebacker | New Orleans Saints |
| 1967 NFL/AFL draft | 4 | 82 | Louis Thompson | Defensive tackle | New York Giants |
| 1967 NFL/AFL draft | 4 | 91 | Wayne Trimble | Defensive back | San Francisco 49ers |
| 1967 NFL/AFL draft | 9 | 230 | Cecil Dowdy | Linebacker | Cleveland Browns |
| 1968 NFL/AFL draft | 1 | 20 | Dennis Homan | Wide receiver | Dallas Cowboys |
| 1968 NFL/AFL draft | 2 | 52 | Ken Stabler | Quarterback | Oakland Raiders |
| 1968 NFL/AFL draft | 12 | 320 | Bobby Johns | Defensive back | Kansas City Chiefs |
| 1969 NFL/AFL draft | 10 | 260 | Mike Hall | Linebacker | New York Jets |
| 1969 NFL/AFL draft | 16 | 413 | William Davis | Linebacker | Oakland Raiders |
