= 1966 Texas A&M Aggies football team =

American college football season

1966 Texas A&M Aggies football
- Conference: Southwest Conference
- Record: 4–5–1 (4–3 SWC)
- Head coach: Gene Stallings (2nd season)
- Home stadium: Kyle Field

1966 Southwest Conference football standings
	Conf.					Overall
Team	W		L		T	W		L		T
No. 10 SMU $	6	–	1	–	0	8	–	3	–	0
Arkansas	5	–	2	–	0	8	–	2	–	0
Texas	5	–	2	–	0	7	–	4	–	0
Texas A&M	4	–	3	–	0	4	–	5	–	1
Baylor	3	–	4	–	0	5	–	5	–	0
Texas Tech	2	–	5	–	0	4	–	6	–	0
TCU	2	–	5	–	0	2	–	8	–	0
Rice	1	–	6	–	0	2	–	8	–	0
$ – Conference champion; Rankings from AP Poll

The 1966 Texas A&M Aggies football team represented Texas A&M University in the 1966 NCAA University Division football season as a member of the Southwest Conference (SWC). The Aggies were led by head coach Gene Stallings in his second season and finished with a record of four wins, five losses and one tie (4–5–1 overall, 4–3 in the SWC).

== Schedule ==
Date	Opponent	Site	Result	Attendance	Source
September 17	at Georgia Tech*	Grant Field; Atlanta, GA	L 3–38	36,215	
September 24	at Tulane*	Tulane Stadium; New Orleans, LA	L 13–21	33,000	
October 1	Texas Tech	Kyle Field; College Station, TX (rivalry)	W 35–14	23,500	
October 8	at LSU*	Tiger Stadium; Baton Rouge, LA (rivalry)	T 7–7	67,500	
October 15	TCU	Kyle Field; College Station, TX (rivalry)	W 35–7	28,500	
October 22	at Baylor	Baylor Stadium; Waco, TX (rivalry)	W 17–13	33,481	
October 29	No. 9 Arkansas	Kyle Field; College Station, TX (rivalry)	L 0–34	40,000	
November 5	at SMU	Cotton Bowl; Dallas, TX	L 14–21	53,000	
November 12	at Rice	Rice Stadium; Houston, TX	W 7–6	43,000	
November 24	at Texas	Memorial Stadium; Austin, TX (rivalry)	L 14–22	65,000	
*Non-conference game; Rankings from AP Poll released prior to the game

== Roster ==
- QB Edd Hargett, So.
