= 1966 Cotton Bowl Classic (December) =

- 31st Cotton Bowl Classic
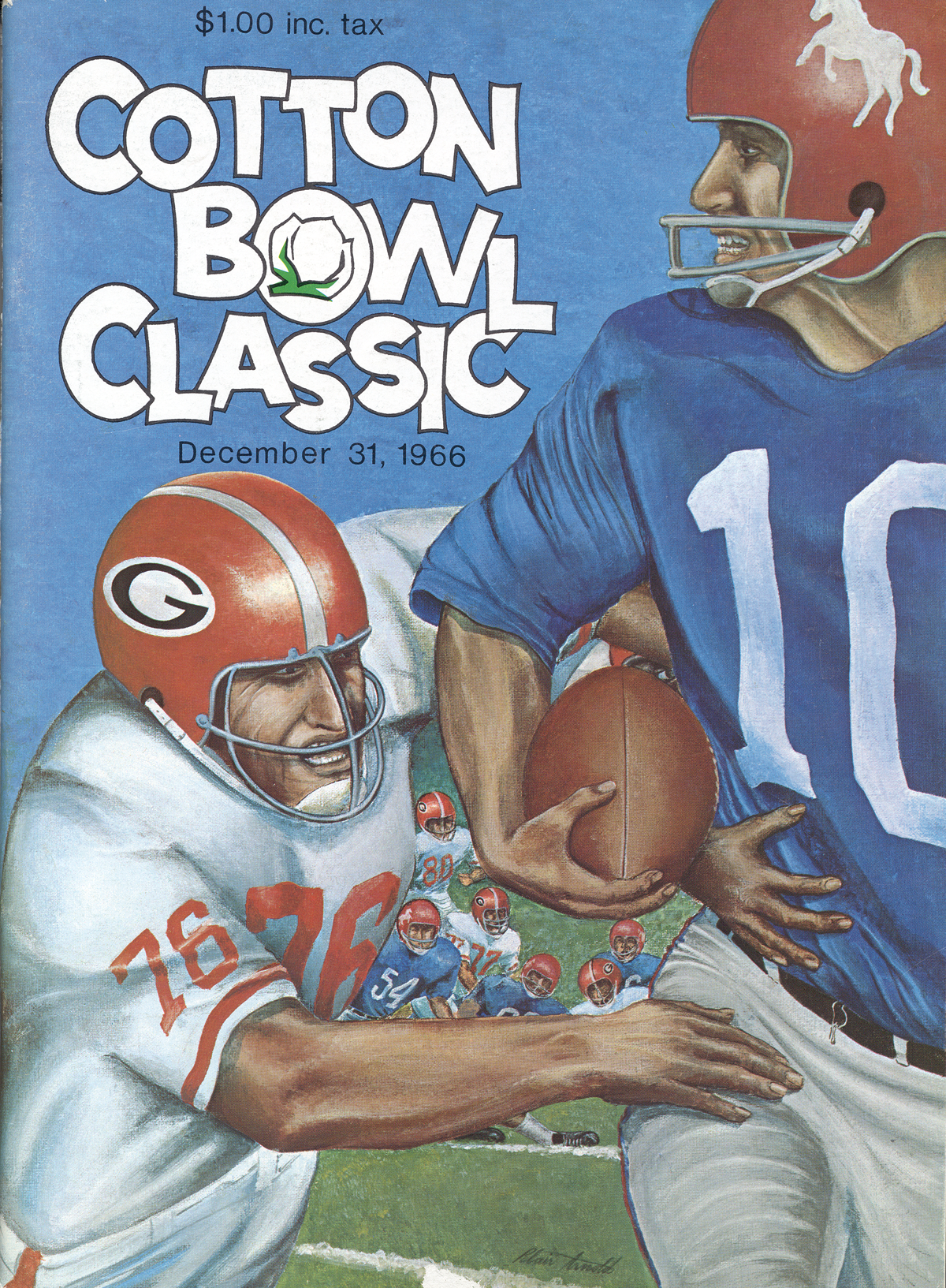
Georgia Bulldogs	SMU Mustangs
(9–1)	(8–2)
SEC	SWC
24	9
Head coach: Vince Dooley	Head coach: Hayden Fry
AP / Coaches; 4 / 4	AP / Coaches; 10 / 9
	1	2	3	4	Total
Georgia	10	7	0	7	24
SMU	3	6	0	0	9
- Date: December 31, 1966
- Season: 1966
- Stadium: Cotton Bowl
- Location: Dallas, Texas
- MVP: Kent Lawrence (Georgia TB); George Patton (Georgia T)
- Favorite: Georgia by 6½ to 7 points
- Referee: Harold Matthews (SWC) (split crew: SWC, SEC)
- Attendance: 75,504

United States TV coverage
- Network: CBS
- Announcers: Jack Drees, Pat Summerall

The Cotton Bowl in Dallas, Texas, hosted the Cotton Bowl Classic.

The 1966 Cotton Bowl Classic (December) was the 31st edition of the college football bowl game, played at the Cotton Bowl in Dallas, Texas, on December 31. (Note: The next day, January 1, 1967, Cotton Bowl stadium hosted the 1966 NFL Championship Game.) It matched the No. 10 SMU Mustangs of the Southwest Conference (SWC) and the No. 4 Georgia Bulldogs of the Southeastern Conference (SEC). (Note: Rankings per AP Poll of the 1966 NCAA University Division football rankings.) Kickoff for the Saturday game was 1:30 p.m. CST and it was televised by CBS.

This was the first playing of the Cotton Bowl Classic in December—the "1967 game" was moved to New Year's Eve because New Year's Day was a Sunday in 1967. The decision to move the game had been announced in January 1966. The other major bowls (Sugar, Orange, Rose) were played on January 2.

== Teams ==
=== SMU ===
The #10 Mustangs (8–2) had won the Southwest Conference (SWC) championship (6–1) for the first time since 1948, led by fifth-year head coach Hayden Fry. They won all five games at the Cotton Bowl, their home stadium through 1978.

=== Georgia ===
Fourth-ranked Georgia (9–1) shared the Southeastern Conference (SEC) title (6–0) with #3 Alabama, with a one-point loss to Miami as their only blemish. They completed the regular season with a rivalry win over previously undefeated Georgia Tech. Led by Vince Dooley, in the third of his 25 seasons as head coach, the Bulldogs were a seven-point favorite. It was their first appearance in a major bowl in seven years.

== Game summary ==
On the second play from scrimmage, Georgia's Kent Lawrence ran 74 yards for a touchdown. SMU responded with a field goal later in the quarter, but Georgia scored ten more points (highlighted by a Billy Payne touchdown catch from Kirby Moore) to lead 17–3. Mike Richardson of SMU scored a touchdown from a yard out to narrow the lead, but the kick was blocked, and it was 17–9 at halftime.

Those were SMU's last points, as Georgia held the Mustangs in check the rest of the game. The Bulldogs scored once more in the fourth quarter, on a four-yard Ronnie Jenkins touchdown run, to seal the game. Ultimately, it was Georgia's rushing attack that won the game for the Bulldogs, who had 244 more rushing yards than the Mustangs, who could only muster forty.

=== Scoring ===
First quarter

- Georgia – Kent Lawrence 74-yard run (Bob Etter kick)
- SMU – Dennis Partee 22-yard field goal
- Georgia – Etter 28-yard field goal

Second quarter

- Georgia – Billy Payne 20-yard pass from Kirby Moore (Etter kick)
- SMU – Mike Richardson 1-yard run (kick blocked)

Third quarter

No scoring

Fourth quarter

- Georgia – Ron Jenkins 4-yard run (Etter kick)

== Statistics ==
Statistics	SMU	Georgia
First downs	11	17
Yards rushing	40	284
Yards passing	165	79
Passing (C–A–I)	10–20–3	6–14–1
Total yards	205	363
Punts–Average	4–36.5	4–28.5
Fumbles–Lost	1–1	2–1
Turnovers	4	2
Penalties–Yards	7–45	3–37
