= 1967 Sugar Bowl =

American college football game

- 33rd Sugar Bowl
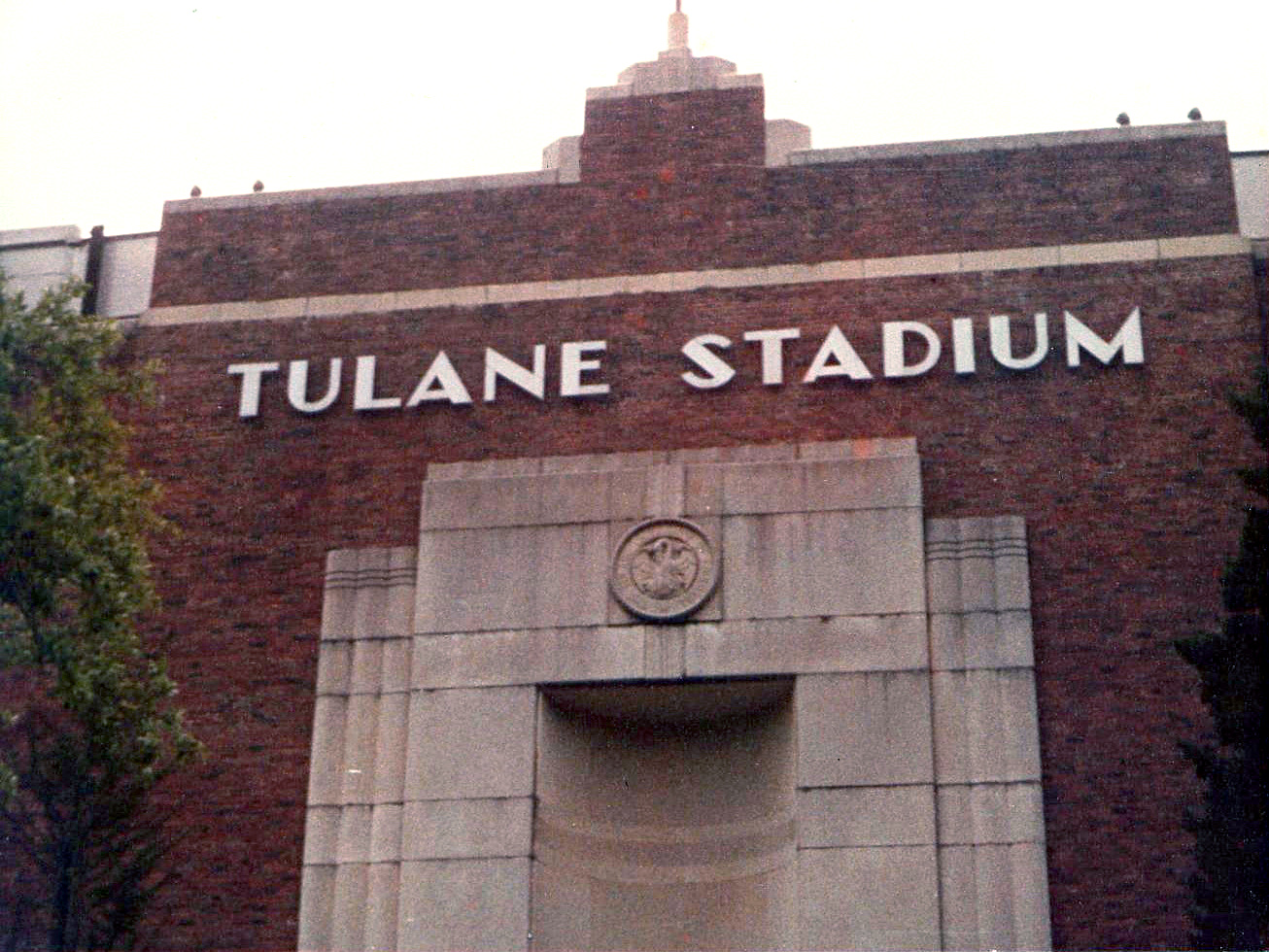
- Tulane Stadium in New Orleans, Louisiana, hosted the Sugar Bowl.
Nebraska Cornhuskers	Alabama Crimson Tide
(9–1)	(10–0)
Big 8	SEC
7	34
Head coach: Bob Devaney	Head coach: Bear Bryant
AP / Coaches; 6 / 6	AP / Coaches; 3 / 3
	1	2	3	4	Total
Nebraska	0	0	0	7	7
Alabama	17	7	3	7	34
- Date: January 2, 1967
- Season: 1966
- Stadium: Tulane Stadium
- Location: New Orleans, Louisiana
- MVP: Ken Stabler (Alabama QB)
- Favorite: Alabama by 9 points
- National anthem: Marguerite Piazza
- Referee: Earl Jansen (Big Eight; split crew, Big Eight and SEC)
- Attendance: 82,000

United States TV coverage
- Network: NBC
- Announcers: Jim Simpson, Charlie Jones
- Nielsen ratings: 23.9

The 1967 Sugar Bowl was the 33rd edition of the college football bowl game, played at Tulane Stadium in New Orleans, Louisiana, on Monday, January 2. Part of the 1966–67 bowl game season, it matched the undefeated and third-ranked Alabama Crimson Tide of the Southeastern Conference (SEC) and the #6 Nebraska Cornhuskers of the Big Eight Conference. Favored by nine points, Alabama won 34–7.

New Year's Day was on a Sunday in 1967, so the game was played the following day.

== Teams ==
=== Alabama ===
Alabama finished the regular season as SEC champions with a record of 10–0. Although undefeated and playing as two-time defending national champions, Alabama did not win the national title in 1966. Instead voters rewarded Notre Dame after coach Ara Parseghian, with his team tied 10–10 with Michigan State with 1:10 to go, chose to play for the tie rather than attempt to win the game. The Fighting Irish and Spartans both finished 9–0–1, did not play in a bowl game, and were ranked first and second in the polls, while Alabama was third; both major polls released their final editions in early December, prior to the bowl games.

This was the Tide's fifth Sugar Bowl, and their twentieth bowl appearance.

=== Nebraska ===
Nebraska finished the regular season as Big Eight champions with a record of 9–1. The only loss of the season came in their final game against Oklahoma by a score of 10–9. In a rematch of the previous season's Orange Bowl, it was the first time for Nebraska in the Sugar Bowl, and their seventh bowl appearance.

== Game summary ==
The Sugar Bowl was the first game of a major bowl tripleheader (Rose, Orange) on NBC, and kicked off at 1 pm CST. There was no competition with the Cotton Bowl for television viewers this year, as that game was played two days earlier, on New Year's Eve.

Alabama scored on its first three offensive possessions to take a 17–0 lead. Leslie Kelley and quarterback Ken Stabler scored touchdowns on runs of one and 14 yards, with Steve Davis adding a 30-yard field goal late in the quarter. A six-yard Wayne Trimble touchdown run in the second quarter gave the Crimson Tide a 24–0 lead at the half.

Alabama extended their lead to 27–0 after a 40-yard field goal by Davis. Nebraska scored their first points early in the fourth quarter, as Dick Davis made a 15-yard touchdown reception from Bob Churchich to cut the lead to 27–7. Alabama closed the game with a 45-yard Ray Perkins touchdown reception from Stabler to bring the final score to 34–7. Stabler was selected as the game's Most Valuable Player for completing 12 of 18 passes for 218 yards and two total touchdowns.

=== Scoring ===
Scoring summary

Quarter	Time	Drive			Team	Scoring information	Score	
Quarter	Time	Plays	Yards	TOP	Team	Scoring information	Nebraska	Alabama
1	10:03	8	72		Alabama	Leslie Kelley 1-yard touchdown run, Steve Davis kick good	0	7
1	7:27	4	71		Alabama	Ken Stabler 14-yard touchdown run, Davis kick good	0	14
1	0:26	4	8		Alabama	30-yard field goal by Davis	0	17
2	7:01	10	71		Alabama	Wayne Trimble 6-yard touchdown run, Davis kick good	0	24
3	3:31				Alabama	40-yard field goal by Davis	0	27
4			70		Nebraska	Dick Davis 15-yard touchdown reception from Bob Churchich, Larry Wachholtz kick good	7	27
4		6	80		Alabama	Ray Perkins 45-yard touchdown reception from Stabler, Davis kick good	7	34
"TOP" = time of possession. For other American football terms, see Glossary of American football.							7	34

== Statistics ==
Statistics	Nebraska	Alabama
First downs	16	19
Rushing yards	25–84	44–157
Passing	22–38–5	15–26–2
Passing yards	279	279
Total offense	63–297	70–436
Punts–average	5–38.8	4–35.2
Fumbles lost	5–2	3–1
Turnovers	7	3
Penalties–yards	2–30	1–15

== Aftermath ==
It was Alabama's last win in a bowl for nine years, until the Sugar Bowl in December 1975. Nebraska did not make a bowl in the next two seasons, but returned the favor five years later in the 1972 Orange Bowl, with a decisive 38–6 win over the #2 Tide to repeat as national champions.
