= 1966 NC State Wolfpack football team =

American college football season

1966 NC State Wolfpack football
- Conference: Atlantic Coast Conference
- Record: 5–5 (5–2 ACC)
- Head coach: Earle Edwards (13th season)
- Home stadium: Carter Stadium

1966 Atlantic Coast Conference football standings
	Conf.					Overall
Team	W		L		T	W		L		T
Clemson $	6	–	1	–	0	6	–	4	–	0
NC State	5	–	2	–	0	5	–	5	–	0
Maryland	3	–	3	–	0	4	–	6	–	0
Virginia	3	–	3	–	0	4	–	6	–	0
Duke	2	–	3	–	0	5	–	5	–	0
Wake Forest	2	–	4	–	0	3	–	7	–	0
South Carolina	1	–	3	–	0	1	–	9	–	0
North Carolina	1	–	4	–	0	2	–	8	–	0
$ – Conference champion

The 1966 NC State Wolfpack football team represented North Carolina State University during the 1966 NCAA University Division football season. The Wolfpack were led by 13th-year head coach Earle Edwards and played their home games at the newly-constructed Carter Stadium in Raleigh, North Carolina. They competed as members of the Atlantic Coast Conference, finishing in second.

== Schedule ==
Date	Opponent	Site	Result	Attendance	Source
September 17	at No. 2 Michigan State*	Spartan Stadium; East Lansing, MI	L 10–28	55,418	
September 24	at North Carolina	Kenan Memorial Stadium; Chapel Hill, NC (rivalry)	L 7–10	47,000	
October 1	at Wake Forest	Bowman Gray Stadium; Winston-Salem, NC (rivalry)	W 15–12	11,000	
October 8	South Carolina	Carter Stadium; Raleigh, NC	L 21–31	35,200	
October 15	No. 8 Florida*	Carter Stadium; Raleigh, NC	L 10–17	41,378	
October 22	at Duke	Duke Stadium; Durham, NC (rivalry)	W 33–7	27,000	
October 29	Virginia	Carter Stadium; Raleigh, NC	W 42–21	28,000	
November 5	Maryland	Carter Stadium; Raleigh, NC	W 24–21	23,500	
November 12	vs. Southern Miss*	Foreman Field; Norfolk, VA (Oyster Bowl)	L 6–7	22,000	
November 19	Clemson	Carter Stadium; Raleigh, NC (rivalry)	W 23–14	31,500	
*Non-conference game; Rankings from AP Poll released prior to the game
