= 1966 Texas Longhorns football team =

American college football season

1966 Texas Longhorns football

Bluebonnet Bowl champion

Bluebonnet Bowl, W 19–0 vs. Ole Miss
- Conference: Southwest Conference
- Record: 7–4 (5–2 SWC)
- Head coach: Darrell Royal (10th season)
- Home stadium: Memorial Stadium

1966 Southwest Conference football standings
	Conf.					Overall
Team	W		L		T	W		L		T
No. 10 SMU $	6	–	1	–	0	8	–	3	–	0
Arkansas	5	–	2	–	0	8	–	2	–	0
Texas	5	–	2	–	0	7	–	4	–	0
Texas A&M	4	–	3	–	0	4	–	5	–	1
Baylor	3	–	4	–	0	5	–	5	–	0
Texas Tech	2	–	5	–	0	4	–	6	–	0
TCU	2	–	5	–	0	2	–	8	–	0
Rice	1	–	6	–	0	2	–	8	–	0
$ – Conference champion; Rankings from AP Poll

The 1966 Texas Longhorns football team was an American football team that represented the University of Texas (now known as the University of Texas at Austin) as a member of the Southwest Conference (SWC) during the 1966 NCAA University Division football season. In their tenth year under head coach Darrell Royal, the Longhorns compiled an overall record of 7–4, with a mark of 5–2 in conference play, and finished tied for second in the SWC.

== Schedule ==
Date	Time	Opponent	Site	TV	Result	Attendance	Source
September 17	2:30 p.m.	No. 9 USC*	Memorial Stadium; Austin, TX	ABC	L 6–10	42,000	
September 24	7:30 p.m.	at Texas Tech	Jones Stadium; Lubbock, TX (rivalry)		W 31–21	48,155	
October 1	7:30 p.m.	Indiana*	Memorial Stadium; Austin, TX		W 35–0	56,000	
October 8	2:00 p.m.	vs. Oklahoma*	Cotton Bowl; Dallas, TX (rivalry)		L 9–18	75,504	
October 15	2:30 p.m.	Arkansas	Memorial Stadium; Austin, TX (rivalry)		L 7–12	66,000	
October 22	7:30 p.m.	at Rice	Rice Stadium; Houston, TX (rivalry)		W 14–6	67,500	
October 29	2:00 p.m.	SMU	Memorial Stadium; Austin, TX		L 12–13	58,500	
November 5	2:00 p.m.	at Baylor	Baylor Stadium; Waco, TX (rivalry)		W 26–14	37,511	
November 12	1:00 p.m.	at TCU	Amon G. Carter Stadium; Fort Worth, TX (rivalry)		W 13–3	31,477	
November 24	2:00 p.m.	Texas A&M	Memorial Stadium; Austin, TX (rivalry)		W 22–14	65,000	
December 17	1:00 p.m.	vs. Ole Miss*	Rice Stadium; Houston, TX (Bluebonnet Bowl)		W 19–0	67,000	
*Non-conference game; Rankings from AP Poll released prior to the game; All times are in Central time

== Game summaries ==
=== USC ===
USC at Texas

Team	1	2	3	4	Total
• No. 9 Trojans	3	7	0	0	10
Longhorns	0	0	0	6	6

- Date: September 17
- Location: Memorial Stadium, Austin, Texas
- Game attendance: 42,000
- TV announcers (ABC): Chris Schenkel, Bud Wilkinson

Scoring summary
Q1	USC	Rossivich 23 yard field goal	USC 3–0
Q2	USC	Winslow 9 yard run (Rossivich kick)	USC 10–0
Q4	TEX	Bradley 3 yard run (pass failed)	USC 10–6

=== Texas Tech ===
Gregg Lott opened the contest with an 88-yard kickoff return for a touchdown while sophomore quarterback Bill Bradley also starred, hitting an 80-yard quick kick that stopped just short of the Tech goal line.
