= 1966 TCU Horned Frogs football team =

American college football season

1966 TCU Horned Frogs football
- Conference: Southwest Conference
- Record: 2–8 (2–5 SWC)
- Head coach: Abe Martin (14th season)
- Offensive scheme: Meyer spread
- Home stadium: Amon G. Carter Stadium

1966 Southwest Conference football standings
	Conf.					Overall
Team	W		L		T	W		L		T
No. 10 SMU $	6	–	1	–	0	8	–	3	–	0
Arkansas	5	–	2	–	0	8	–	2	–	0
Texas	5	–	2	–	0	7	–	4	–	0
Texas A&M	4	–	3	–	0	4	–	5	–	1
Baylor	3	–	4	–	0	5	–	5	–	0
Texas Tech	2	–	5	–	0	4	–	6	–	0
TCU	2	–	5	–	0	2	–	8	–	0
Rice	1	–	6	–	0	2	–	8	–	0
$ – Conference champion; Rankings from AP Poll

The 1966 TCU Horned Frogs football team represented Texas Christian University (TCU) in the 1966 NCAA University Division football season. The Horned Frogs finished the season 2–8 overall and 2–5 in the Southwest Conference. The team was coached by Abe Martin in his 14th and final year as head coach. The Frogs played their home games in Amon G. Carter Stadium, which is located on campus in Fort Worth, Texas.

== Schedule ==
Date	Opponent	Site	Result	Attendance	Source
September 17	at No. 3 Nebraska*	Memorial Stadium; Lincoln, NE	L 10–14	60,974	
September 24	at Ohio State*	Ohio Stadium; Columbus, OH	L 7–14	75,375	
October 1	No. 7 Arkansas	Amon G. Carter Stadium; Fort Worth, TX	L 0–21	44,415	
October 8	Texas Tech	Amon G. Carter Stadium; Fort Worth, TX (rivalry)	W 6–3	25,064	
October 15	at Texas A&M	Kyle Field; College Station, TX (rivalry)	L 7–35	28,500	
October 22	at Auburn*	Cliff Hare Stadium; Auburn, AL	L 6–7	34,976	
October 29	Baylor	Amon G. Carter Stadium; Fort Worth, TX (rivalry)	W 6–0	24,848	
November 12	No. 8 Texas	Amon G. Carter Stadium; Fort Worth, TX (rivalry)	L 3–13	31,477	
November 19	at Rice	Rice Stadium; Houston, TX	L 10–21	21,000	
November 26	SMU	Amon G. Carter Stadium; Fort Worth, TX (rivalry)	L 0–21	30,757	
*Non-conference game; Rankings from AP Poll released prior to the game
