= 1966 Georgia Bulldogs football team =

American college football season

1966 Georgia Bulldogs football

SEC co-champion Cotton Bowl Classic champion

Cotton Bowl Classic, W 24–9 vs. SMU
- Conference: Southeastern Conference

Ranking
- Coaches: No. 4
- AP: No. 4
- Record: 10–1 (6–0 SEC)
- Head coach: Vince Dooley (3rd season)
- Defensive coordinator: Erk Russell (3rd season)
- Home stadium: Sanford Stadium

1966 Southeastern Conference football standings
	Conf.					Overall
Team	W		L		T	W		L		T
No. 3 Alabama +	6	–	0	–	0	11	–	0	–	0
No. 4 Georgia +	6	–	0	–	0	10	–	1	–	0
Florida	5	–	1	–	0	9	–	2	–	0
Ole Miss	5	–	2	–	0	8	–	3	–	0
Tennessee	4	–	2	–	0	8	–	3	–	0
LSU	3	–	3	–	0	5	–	4	–	1
Kentucky	2	–	4	–	0	3	–	6	–	1
Auburn	1	–	5	–	0	4	–	6	–	0
Mississippi State	0	–	6	–	0	2	–	8	–	0
Vanderbilt	0	–	6	–	0	1	–	9	–	0
+ – Conference co-champions; Georgia's game against North Carolina; Florida, LSU, and Vanderbilt's games against Tulane; and Tennessee's game against South Carolina counted in the conference standings.; Rankings from AP Poll

The 1966 Georgia Bulldogs football team represented the University of Georgia as a member of the Southeastern Conference (SEC) during the 1966 NCAA University Division football season. Led by third-year head coach Vince Dooley, the Bulldogs compiled an overall record of 10–1 with a mark of 6–0 in conference play, sharing the SEC title with Alabama. The Bulldogs had wins over seventh-ranked Florida and fifth-ranked Georgia Tech in the regular season and a win over tenth-ranked SMU in the Cotton Bowl Classic by a score of 24–9.

== Schedule ==
Date	Opponent	Rank	Site	TV	Result	Attendance	Source
September 17	at Mississippi State		Mississippi Veterans Memorial Stadium; Jackson, MS		W 20–17	34,000	
September 24	vs. VMI*		Victory Stadium; Roanoke, VA (Harvest Bowl)		W 43–7	15,000	
October 1	at South Carolina*		Carolina Stadium; Columbia, SC (rivalry)		W 7–0	31,141	
October 8	Ole Miss		Sanford Stadium; Athens, GA		W 9–3	45,200	
October 14	at Miami (FL)*		Orange Bowl; Miami, FL		L 6–7	41,756	
October 22	Kentucky^{†}		Sanford Stadium; Athens, GA		W 27–15	45,348	
October 29	North Carolina (Note: Georgia's game against North Carolina counted in the SEC standings.)		Sanford Stadium; Athens, GA		W 28–3	45,321	
November 5	vs. No. 7 Florida		Gator Bowl Stadium; Jacksonville, FL (rivalry)		W 27–10	62,820	
November 12	at Auburn	No. 9	Cliff Hare Stadium; Auburn, AL (rivalry)		W 21–13	47,000	
November 26	No. 5 Georgia Tech*	No. 7	Sanford Stadium; Athens, GA (rivlary)		W 23–14	48,782	
December 31	vs. No. 10 SMU*	No. 4	Cotton Bowl; Dallas, TX (Cotton Bowl Classic)	CBS	W 24–9	75,504	
*Non-conference game; ^{†}Homecoming; Rankings from AP Poll released prior to the game

== Roster ==
1966 Georgia Bulldogs football team roster
Players
Coaches
Offense

Pos.	#	Name	Class
QB	14	Kirby Moore	Jr
TB	24	Kent Lawrence	So
FB	41	Brad Johnson
FB	44	Ronnie Jenkins
SE	87	Billy Payne	So
QB		Danny Cronic	So

Defense

Pos.	#	Name	Class
S	16	Lynn Hughes
LB	57	Happyn Dicks
DT	76	George Patton	Sr
DT	77	Bill Stanfill	So

Special teams

Pos.	#	Name	Class
PK	11	Bob Etter	Jr

Head coach

- Vince Dooley

Coordinators/assistant coaches

- Erk Russell
  (Defensive coordinator)
- Hootie Ingram
  (Defensive backs coach)

Legend

- (C) Team captain
- (S) Suspended
- (I) Ineligible
- Injured
- Redshirt

Roster
