= 1966 Virginia Cavaliers football team =

American college football season

1966 Virginia Cavaliers football
- Conference: Atlantic Coast Conference
- Record: 4–6 (3–3 ACC)
- Head coach: George Blackburn (2nd season)
- Captains: Edward Carrington; Donald Parker
- Home stadium: Scott Stadium

1966 Atlantic Coast Conference football standings
	Conf.					Overall
Team	W		L		T	W		L		T
Clemson $	6	–	1	–	0	6	–	4	–	0
NC State	5	–	2	–	0	5	–	5	–	0
Maryland	3	–	3	–	0	4	–	6	–	0
Virginia	3	–	3	–	0	4	–	6	–	0
Duke	2	–	3	–	0	5	–	5	–	0
Wake Forest	2	–	4	–	0	3	–	7	–	0
South Carolina	1	–	3	–	0	1	–	9	–	0
North Carolina	1	–	4	–	0	2	–	8	–	0
$ – Conference champion

The 1966 Virginia Cavaliers football team represented the University of Virginia during the 1966 NCAA University Division football season. The Cavaliers were led by second-year head coach George Blackburn and played their home games at Scott Stadium in Charlottesville, Virginia. They competed as members of the Atlantic Coast Conference, finishing tied for third.

== Schedule ==
Date	Opponent	Site	Result	Attendance	Source
September 17	Wake Forest	Scott Stadium; Charlottesville, VA	W 24–10	17,000	
September 24	at Clemson	Memorial Stadium; Clemson, SC	L 35–40	36,000	
October 1	at Duke	Duke Stadium; Durham, NC	L 8–27	10,000	
October 8	Tulane*	Scott Stadium; Charlottesville, VA	L 6–20	20,000	
October 15	VMI*^{†}	Scott Stadium; Charlottesville, VA	W 38–27	18,000	
October 22	Virginia Tech*	Scott Stadium; Charlottesville, VA (rivalry)	L 7–24	29,000	
October 29	at NC State	Carter Stadium; Raleigh, NC	L 21–42	28,000	
November 5	at No. 5 Georgia Tech*	Grant Field; Atlanta, GA	L 13–14	42,126	
November 19	Maryland	Scott Stadium; Charlottesville, VA (rivalry)	W 41–17	16,000	
November 26	at North Carolina	Kenan Memorial Stadium; Chapel Hill, NC (South's Oldest Rivalry)	W 21–14	25,000	
*Non-conference game; ^{†}Homecoming; Rankings from AP Poll released prior to the game
