= Paul Naumoff =

American football player (1945–2018)

No. 58, 50
- Position: Linebacker

Personal information
- Born: July 3, 1945; Columbus, Ohio, U.S.
- Died: August 17, 2018 (aged 73); Lenoir City, Tennessee, U.S.
- Listed height: 6 ft 1 in (1.85 m)
- Listed weight: 215 lb (98 kg)

Career information
- High school: Eastmoor Academy (Columbus)
- College: Tennessee
- NFL draft: 1967: 3rd round, 60th overall pick

Career history
- Detroit Lions (1967–1978)

Awards and highlights
- Pro Bowl (1970); Consensus All-American (1966); First-team All-SEC (1966)

Career NFL statistics
- Fumble recoveries: 7
- Interceptions: 6
- Sacks: 20.5
- Stats at Pro Football Reference

Paul Peter Naumoff (July 3, 1945 – August 17, 2018) was an American professional football player who was a linebacker for the Detroit Lions of the National Football League (NFL). Naumoff played college football for the Tennessee Volunteers from 1964 to 1966 and was selected as a consensus first-team All-American in 1966. He played for the Lions from 1967 to 1978. He was selected to play in the Pro Bowl after the 1970 season and was named the Lions' defensive most valuable player in 1975. He once played in 142 consecutive games for the Lions and missed only two games in 12 years with the club.

== Early life ==
Naumoff was born in Columbus, Ohio, in 1945, and attended Eastmoor Academy there. He was the son of Macedonian immigrants.

== College football ==
Naumoff enrolled at the University of Tennessee and played college football for the Tennessee Volunteers football team under coach Doug Dickey from 1964 to 1966. He began as an offensive player in 1964 but was moved to defense in 1965. As a defensive end, he helped lead the 1965 Tennessee team to an 8–1–2 record, a #7 ranking in the final AP Poll, and a victory over Tulsa in the 1965 Bluebonnet Bowl.

In 1966, Naumoff moved to linebacker after one of the team's starting linebackers, Tom Fisher, died in an automobile accident. He helped lead the 1966 Tennessee team to an 8-3 record. He was awarded the game ball after the 1966 Gator Bowl. Naumoff made a "jolting tackle" of Larry Csonka late in the game to preserve Tennessee's 18-12 victory over Syracuse.

At the end of the 1966 season, Naumoff was selected as a consensus first-team linebacker on the 1966 College Football All-America Team. He also played in the 1967 Chicago College All-Star Game and the 1967 Senior Bowl. Naumoff received a bachelor's degree of education in 1967.

== Professional football ==
Naumoff was selected by the Detroit Lions in the third round, 60th overall pick, of the 1967 NFL/AFL draft. He played 12 years for the Lions from 1967 to 1978. He was selected to play in the Pro Bowl after the 1970 season. In 1975, Naumoff had two interceptions and was voted by his teammates as the Lions' defensive most valuable player. Naumoff once played in 142 consecutive games for the Lions and missed only two games in 12 years with the club. In July 1979, at age 33, Naumoff announced his retirement as a player, citing a foot injury that had required two surgeries and posed the risk of permanent damage. At the time of his retirement, Naumoff had appeared in 168 games for the Lions, more than any other players in franchise history other than Wayne Walker and Dick LeBeau.

== Later life ==
After retiring from the NFL, Naumoff opened a beer distributorship in Tennessee.
