= 1966 Clemson Tigers football team =

American college football season

1966 Clemson Tigers football

ACC champion
- Conference: Atlantic Coast Conference
- Record: 6–4 (6–1 ACC)
- Head coach: Frank Howard (27th season)
- Captain: Mike Facciolo
- Home stadium: Memorial Stadium

1966 Atlantic Coast Conference football standings
	Conf.					Overall
Team	W		L		T	W		L		T
Clemson $	6	–	1	–	0	6	–	4	–	0
NC State	5	–	2	–	0	5	–	5	–	0
Maryland	3	–	3	–	0	4	–	6	–	0
Virginia	3	–	3	–	0	4	–	6	–	0
Duke	2	–	3	–	0	5	–	5	–	0
Wake Forest	2	–	4	–	0	3	–	7	–	0
South Carolina	1	–	3	–	0	1	–	9	–	0
North Carolina	1	–	4	–	0	2	–	8	–	0
$ – Conference champion

The 1966 Clemson Tigers football team was an American football team that represented Clemson University in the Atlantic Coast Conference (ACC) during the 1966 NCAA University Division football season. In its 27th season under head coach Frank Howard, the team compiled a 6–4 record (6–1 against conference opponents), won the ACC championship, and was outscored by a total of 177 to 174. The team played its home games at Memorial Stadium in Clemson, South Carolina.

Mike Facciolo was the team captain. The team's statistical leaders included Jimmy Addison with 1,491 passing yards, Buddy Gore with 750 rushing yards, Phil Rogers with 574 receiving yards, and Jacky Jackson with 48 points scored.

Five Clemson players were selected by the Associated Press as first-team players on the 1966 All-Atlantic Coast Conference football team: back Jimmy Addison; offensive tackle Wayne Mass; offensive guard Harry Olszewski; defensive end Butch Sursavage; and defensive back Wayne Page.

== Schedule ==
Date	Time	Opponent	Site	Result	Attendance	Source
September 24	2:00 p.m.	Virginia	Memorial Stadium; Clemson, SC	W 40–35	36,000	
October 1	2:00 p.m.	at No. 9 Georgia Tech*	Grant Field; Atlanta, GA (rivalry)	L 12–13	44,735	
October 8	3:00 p.m.	at No. 4 Alabama*	Denny Stadium; Tuscaloosa, AL (rivalry)	L 0–26	46,486	
October 15	1:15 p.m.	Duke^{†}	Memorial Stadium; Clemson, SC	W 9–6	30,000	
October 22	4:30 p.m.	at No. 5 USC*	Los Angeles Memorial Coliseum; Los Angeles, CA	L 0–30	44,614	
October 29	2:00 p.m.	at Wake Forest	Bowman Gray Stadium; Winston-Salem, NC	W 23–21	15,700	
November 5	2:00 p.m.	North Carolina	Memorial Stadium; Clemson, SC	W 27–3	33,000	
November 12	1:30 p.m.	at Maryland	Byrd Stadium; College Park, MD	W 14–10	24,500	
November 19	1:30 p.m.	at NC State	Carter Stadium; Raleigh, NC (rivalry)	L 14–23	31,500	
November 26	2:00 p.m.	South Carolina	Memorial Stadium; Clemson, SC (rivalry)	W 35–10	47,237	
*Non-conference game; ^{†}Homecoming; Rankings from AP Poll released prior to the game; All times are in Eastern time
