= 1966 Texas Tech Red Raiders football team =

American college football season

1966 Texas Tech Red Raiders football
- Conference: Southwest Conference
- Record: 4–6 (2–5 SWC)
- Head coach: J. T. King (6th season)
- Offensive scheme: T formation
- Base defense: 4–3
- Home stadium: Jones Stadium

1966 Southwest Conference football standings
	Conf.					Overall
Team	W		L		T	W		L		T
No. 10 SMU $	6	–	1	–	0	8	–	3	–	0
Arkansas	5	–	2	–	0	8	–	2	–	0
Texas	5	–	2	–	0	7	–	4	–	0
Texas A&M	4	–	3	–	0	4	–	5	–	1
Baylor	3	–	4	–	0	5	–	5	–	0
Texas Tech	2	–	5	–	0	4	–	6	–	0
TCU	2	–	5	–	0	2	–	8	–	0
Rice	1	–	6	–	0	2	–	8	–	0
$ – Conference champion; Rankings from AP Poll

The 1966 Texas Tech Red Raiders football team represented Texas Technological College—now known as Texas Tech University—as a Southwest Conference (SWC) member during the 1966 NCAA University Division football season. In their sixth season under head coach J. T. King, the Red Raiders compiled a 4–6 record (2–5 against conference opponents), tied for sixth place in the SWC, and were outscored by opponents by a combined total of 216 to 181. The team's statistical leaders included John Scovell with 1,323 passing yards, Mike Leinert with 495 rushing yards, and Larry Gilbert with 767 receiving yards. The team played its home games at Clifford B. & Audrey Jones Stadium.

== Schedule ==
Date	Opponent	Site	Result	Attendance	Source
September 17	at Kansas*	Memorial Stadium; Lawrence, KS	W 23–7	28,165	
September 24	Texas	Jones Stadium; Lubbock, TX (rivalry)	L 21–31	48,155	
October 1	at Texas A&M	Kyle Field; College Station, TX (rivalry)	L 14–35	23,500	
October 8	at TCU	Amon G. Carter Stadium; Fort Worth, TX (rivalry)	L 3–6	25,064	
October 15	Florida State*	Jones Stadium; Lubbock, TX	L 33–42	28,307	
October 22	SMU^{†}	Jones Stadium; Lubbock, TX	L 7–24	40,350	
October 29	at Rice	Rice Stadium; Houston, TX	W 35–19	21,000	
November 5	Oklahoma State*	Jones Stadium; Lubbock, TX	W 10–7	28,175	
November 12	Baylor	Jones Stadium; Lubbock, TX (rivalry)	L 14–29	28,965	
November 19	No. 6 Arkansas	Jones Stadium; Lubbock, TX (rivalry)	W 21–16	34,565	
*Non-conference game; ^{†}Homecoming; Rankings from AP Poll released prior to the game
