= 1966 Duke Blue Devils football team =

American college football season

1966 Duke Blue Devils football
- Conference: Atlantic Coast Conference
- Record: 5–5 (2–3 ACC)
- Head coach: Tom Harp (1st season)
- Offensive coordinator: Jacque Hetrick (1st season)
- Defensive coordinator: George Hill (1st season)
- MVP: Bob Matheson
- Captains: Bob Matheson; Mike Shasby
- Home stadium: Duke Stadium

1966 Atlantic Coast Conference football standings
	Conf.					Overall
Team	W		L		T	W		L		T
Clemson $	6	–	1	–	0	6	–	4	–	0
NC State	5	–	2	–	0	5	–	5	–	0
Maryland	3	–	3	–	0	4	–	6	–	0
Virginia	3	–	3	–	0	4	–	6	–	0
Duke	2	–	3	–	0	5	–	5	–	0
Wake Forest	2	–	4	–	0	3	–	7	–	0
South Carolina	1	–	3	–	0	1	–	9	–	0
North Carolina	1	–	4	–	0	2	–	8	–	0
$ – Conference champion

The 1966 Duke Blue Devils football team was an American football team that represented Duke University as a member of the Atlantic Coast Conference (ACC) during the 1966 NCAA University Division football season. In their first year under head coach Tom Harp, the Blue Devils compiled an overall record of 5–5, with a conference record of 2–3, and finished fifth in the ACC.

== Schedule ==
Date	Opponent	Site	Result	Attendance	Source
September 17	West Virginia*	Duke Stadium; Durham, NC	W 34–15	25,000	
September 24	at Pittsburgh*	Pitt Stadium; Pittsburgh, PA	W 14–7	24,684	
October 1	Virginia	Duke Stadium; Durham, NC	W 27–8	10,000	
October 8	at Maryland	Byrd Stadium; College Park, MD	L 19–21	28,400	
October 15	at Clemson	Memorial Stadium; Clemson, SC	L 6–9	30,000	
October 22	NC State	Duke Stadium; Durham, NC (rivalry)	L 7–33	27,000	
October 29	No. 6 Georgia Tech*^{†}	Duke Stadium; Durham, NC	L 7–48	42,000	
November 5	at Navy*	Navy–Marine Corps Memorial Stadium; Annapolis, MD	W 9–7	22,303	
November 12	at No. 1 Notre Dame*	Notre Dame Stadium; Notre Dame, IN	L 0–64	59,075	
November 19	at North Carolina	Kenan Stadium; Chapel Hill, NC (Victory Bell)	W 41–25	46,000	
*Non-conference game; ^{†}Homecoming; Rankings from AP Poll released prior to the game

== Roster ==
1966 Duke Blue Devils football team roster
Players
Coaches
Offense

Pos.	#	Name	Class
WR	86	Dave Dunaway	Sr
G	63	Carl Gersbach
QB	18	Al Woodall

Defense

Pos.	#	Name	Class
LB	28	Bob Matheson	Sr

Special teams

Pos.	#	Name	Class

Head coach

- Tom Harp

Coordinators/assistant coaches

Legend

- (C) Team captain
- (S) Suspended
- (I) Ineligible
- Injured
- Redshirt
