= 1966 Cotton Bowl Classic =

The 1966 Cotton Bowl Classic may refer to:

- 1966 Cotton Bowl Classic (January) — January 1, 1966, game between the LSU Tigers and the Arkansas Razorbacks
- 1966 Cotton Bowl Classic (December) — December 31, 1966, game between the Georgia Bulldogs and the SMU Mustangs
