= 1966 Rice Owls football team =

American college football season

1966 Rice Owls football
- Conference: Southwest Conference
- Record: 2–8 (1–6 SWC)
- Head coach: Jess Neely (27th season)
- Home stadium: Rice Stadium

1966 Southwest Conference football standings
	Conf.					Overall
Team	W		L		T	W		L		T
No. 10 SMU $	6	–	1	–	0	8	–	3	–	0
Arkansas	5	–	2	–	0	8	–	2	–	0
Texas	5	–	2	–	0	7	–	4	–	0
Texas A&M	4	–	3	–	0	4	–	5	–	1
Baylor	3	–	4	–	0	5	–	5	–	0
Texas Tech	2	–	5	–	0	4	–	6	–	0
TCU	2	–	5	–	0	2	–	8	–	0
Rice	1	–	6	–	0	2	–	8	–	0
$ – Conference champion; Rankings from AP Poll

The 1966 Rice Owls football team represented Rice University during the 1966 NCAA University Division football season. In its 27th and final season under head coach Jess Neely, the team compiled a 2–8 record, finished last in the conference, and was outscored by a total of 211 to 154. The team played its home games at Rice Stadium in Houston.

The team's statistical leaders included Robert Hailey with 859 passing yards, Robby Shelton with 607 rushing yards, Glen Hine with 323 receiving yards, and L.V. Benningfield and Robby Shelton with 36 points each. Two Rice players were selected by the Associated Press (AP) as first-team players on the 1966 All-Southwest Conference football team: fullback Lester Lehman and safety Chuck Latourette.

== Schedule ==
Date	Opponent	Site	Result	Attendance	Source
September 24	LSU*	Rice Stadium; Houston, TX	W 17–15	63,000	
October 1	at No. 10 Tennessee*	Neyland Stadium; Knoxville, TN	L 3–23	44,053	
October 8	No. 2 UCLA*	Rice Stadium; Houston, TX	L 24–27	33,000	
October 15	at SMU	Cotton Bowl; Dallas, TX (rivalry)	L 24–28	30,000	
October 22	Texas	Rice Stadium; Houston, TX (rivalry)	L 6–14	67,500	
October 29	Texas Tech	Rice Stadium; Houston, TX	L 19–35	21,000	
November 5	at No. 8 Arkansas	War Memorial Stadium; Little Rock, AR	L 20–31	47,000	
November 12	Texas A&M	Rice Stadium; Houston, TX	L 6–7	43,000	
November 19	TCU	Rice Stadium; Houston, TX	W 21–10	21,000	
November 26	at Baylor	Baylor Stadium; Waco, TX	L 14–21	17,216	
*Non-conference game; Rankings from AP Poll released prior to the game
