= 1966 Baylor Bears football team =

American college football season

1966 Baylor Bears football
- Conference: Southwest Conference
- Record: 5–5 (3–4 SWC)
- Head coach: John Bridgers (8th season)
- Captains: Dwight Hood; Terry Southall
- Home stadium: Baylor Stadium

1966 Southwest Conference football standings
| | Conf. | | | | | Overall |
| Team | W | | L | | T | W | | L | | T |
|---|---|---|---|---|---|---|---|---|---|---|
| No. 10 SMU $ | 6 | – | 1 | – | 0 | 8 | – | 3 | – | 0 |
| Arkansas | 5 | – | 2 | – | 0 | 8 | – | 2 | – | 0 |
| Texas | 5 | – | 2 | – | 0 | 7 | – | 4 | – | 0 |
| Texas A&M | 4 | – | 3 | – | 0 | 4 | – | 5 | – | 1 |
| Baylor | 3 | – | 4 | – | 0 | 5 | – | 5 | – | 0 |
| Texas Tech | 2 | – | 5 | – | 0 | 4 | – | 6 | – | 0 |
| TCU | 2 | – | 5 | – | 0 | 2 | – | 8 | – | 0 |
| Rice | 1 | – | 6 | – | 0 | 2 | – | 8 | – | 0 |
$ – Conference champion; Rankings from AP Poll

The 1966 Baylor Bears football team represented Baylor University in the Southwest Conference (SWC) during the 1966 NCAA University Division football season. In their eighth season under head coach John Bridgers, the Bears compiled a 5–5 record (3–4 in SWC, fifth), and were outscored 168 to 140. They played their home games at Baylor Stadium in Waco, Texas.

The team's statistical leaders included Terry Southall with 1,986 passing yards, Richard Defee with 332 rushing yards and 36 points scored, and Tommy Smith with 483 receiving yards. Dwight Hood and Terry Southall were the team captains.

== Schedule ==
| Date | Opponent | Rank | Site | Result | Attendance | Source |
|---|---|---|---|---|---|---|
| September 10 | No. 7 Syracuse* | | Baylor Stadium; Waco, TX | W 35–12 | 31,000 | |
| September 24 | Colorado* | No. 10 | Baylor Stadium; Waco, TX | L 7–13 | 29,000 | |
| October 1 | at Washington State* | | Joe Albi Stadium; Spokane, WA | W 20–14 | 18,500–19,775 | |
| October 8 | at No. 5 Arkansas | | Razorback Stadium; Fayetteville, AR | W 7–0 | 39,518 | |
| October 22 | Texas A&M^{†} | | Baylor Stadium; Waco, TX (rivalry) | L 13–17 | 33,481 | |
| October 29 | at TCU | | Amon G. Carter Stadium; Fort Worth, TX (rivalry) | L 0–6 | 24,848 | |
| November 5 | Texas | | Baylor Stadium; Waco, TX (rivalry) | L 14–26 | 37,511 | |
| November 12 | at Texas Tech | | Jones Stadium; Lubbock, TX (rivalry) | W 29–14 | 28,965 | |
| November 19 | at SMU | | Cotton Bowl; Dallas, TX | L 22–24 | 30,000 | |
| November 26 | Rice | | Baylor Stadium; Waco, TX | W 21–14 | 17,216 | |
*Non-conference game; ^{†}Homecoming; Rankings from AP Poll released prior to the game
