= Eastmoor Academy =

Location
- 417 South Weyant Avenue; Columbus, (Franklin County), Ohio 43213; United States
- Coordinates: 39°57′49″N 82°54′30″W

Information
- Type: Public, coeducational high school
- School district: Columbus City Schools
- Superintendent: Angela Chapman
- Grades: 9–12
- Colors: Red, white and royal blue
- Athletics conference: Columbus City League
- Mascot: Titan Warrior
- Team name: Warriors
- Rival: Walnut Ridge
- Accreditation: North Central Association of Colleges and Schools
- Website: www.ccsoh.us/eastmooracademyhs

Eastmoor Academy is a public high school located on the east side of Columbus, Ohio. It is part of Columbus City Schools.

Eastmoor Academy was formerly known as Eastmoor High School. The school's colors are red, white and blue, and its mascot is a warrior.

In the 1960s, frequent performers at Eastmoor included Mexican virtuoso solo trumpeter, Rafael Méndez, and the American jazz trumpeter, Doc Severinsen. During the eighties, the school was a frequent stop for high-profile speakers in the civil rights movement such as Coretta Scott King.

The movie Speak starring Kristen Stewart was filmed at Eastmoor in 2003.

In 2008, the Eastmoor football team went 13–2, eventually losing in the Division 3 State Championship Game to the Aurora Greenmen, 21–10.

== Ohio High School Athletic Association State Championships ==
- Girls Track and Field - 2004, 2005, 2013

== Notable alumni ==
Eastmoor is the high school alma mater of two-time Heisman Trophy winner Archie Griffin, after whom their football stadium is now named; it is also the alma mater of former Lynyrd Skynyrd drummer Artimus Pyle (class of 1966), and jazz musician Michael Feinstein.

Detroit Lions linebacker Paul Naumoff is a graduate (1964), as was Doug Van Horn, offensive lineman for the Detroit Lions and later the New York Giants.
