= 1966 Maryland Terrapins football team =

American college football season

1966 Maryland Terrapins football
- Conference: Atlantic Coast Conference
- Record: 4–6 (3–3 ACC)
- Head coach: Lou Saban (1st season)
- Home stadium: Byrd Stadium

1966 Atlantic Coast Conference football standings
	Conf.					Overall
Team	W		L		T	W		L		T
Clemson $	6	–	1	–	0	6	–	4	–	0
NC State	5	–	2	–	0	5	–	5	–	0
Maryland	3	–	3	–	0	4	–	6	–	0
Virginia	3	–	3	–	0	4	–	6	–	0
Duke	2	–	3	–	0	5	–	5	–	0
Wake Forest	2	–	4	–	0	3	–	7	–	0
South Carolina	1	–	3	–	0	1	–	9	–	0
North Carolina	1	–	4	–	0	2	–	8	–	0
$ – Conference champion

The 1966 Maryland Terrapins football team represented the University of Maryland in the 1966 NCAA University Division football season. In their first and only season under head coach Lou Saban, the Terrapins compiled a 4–6 record (3–3 in conference), finished in a tie for third place in the Atlantic Coast Conference, and were outscored by their opponents 204 to 180. The team's statistical leaders included Alan Pastrana with 1,499 passing yards, Billy Lovett with 451 rushing yards, and Billy Van Heusen with 536 receiving yards.

== Schedule ==
Date	Opponent	Site	Result	Attendance	Source
September 17	at Penn State*	Beaver Stadium; University Park, PA (rivalry)	L 7–15	40,911	
September 24	Wake Forest	Byrd Stadium; College Park, MD	W 34–7	26,500	
October 1	at Syracuse*	Archbold Stadium; Syracuse, NY	L 7–28	24,000	
October 8	Duke	Byrd Stadium; College Park, MD	W 21–19	28,400	
October 15	West Virginia*	Byrd Stadium; College Park, MD (rivalry)	W 28–9	28,800	
October 29	South Carolina	Byrd Stadium; College Park, MD	W 14–2	35,400	
November 5	at NC State	Carter Stadium; Raleigh, NC	L 21–24	23,500	
November 12	Clemson	Byrd Stadium; College Park, MD	L 10–14	24,500	
November 19	at Virginia	Scott Stadium; Charlottesville, VA (rivalry)	L 17–41	16,000	
November 26	at Florida State*	Doak Campbell Stadium; Tallahassee, FL	L 21–45	33,000	
*Non-conference game

== Roster ==
1966 Maryland Terrapins football team roster
Players
Coaches
Offense

Pos.	#	Name	Class
QB	12	Alan Pastrana	So
WR	45	Billy Van Heusen	Jr

Defense

Pos.	#	Name	Class

Special teams

Pos.	#	Name	Class

Head coach

- Lou Saban

Coordinators/assistant coaches

Legend

- (C) Team captain
- (S) Suspended
- (I) Ineligible
- Injured
- Redshirt
