= 1966 Wake Forest Demon Deacons football team =

American college football season

1966 Wake Forest Demon Deacons football
- Conference: Atlantic Coast Conference
- Record: 3–7 (2–4 ACC)
- Head coach: Bill Tate (3rd season)
- Captain: Game captains
- Home stadium: Bowman Gray Stadium

1966 Atlantic Coast Conference football standings
	Conf.					Overall
Team	W		L		T	W		L		T
Clemson $	6	–	1	–	0	6	–	4	–	0
NC State	5	–	2	–	0	5	–	5	–	0
Maryland	3	–	3	–	0	4	–	6	–	0
Virginia	3	–	3	–	0	4	–	6	–	0
Duke	2	–	3	–	0	5	–	5	–	0
Wake Forest	2	–	4	–	0	3	–	7	–	0
South Carolina	1	–	3	–	0	1	–	9	–	0
North Carolina	1	–	4	–	0	2	–	8	–	0
$ – Conference champion

The 1966 Wake Forest Demon Deacons football team was an American football team that represented Wake Forest University during the 1966 NCAA University Division football season. In their third season under head coach Bill Tate, the Demon Deacons compiled a 3–7 record and finished in sixth place in the Atlantic Coast Conference.

== Schedule ==
Date	Opponent	Site	Result	Attendance	Source
September 17	at Virginia	Scott Stadium; Charlottesville, VA	L 10–24	17,000	
September 24	at Maryland	Byrd Stadium; College Park, MD	L 7–34	26,500	
October 1	NC State	Bowman Gray Stadium; Winston-Salem, NC (rivalry)	L 12–15	11,000	
October 8	at Auburn*	Cliff Hare Stadium; Auburn, AL	L 6–14	18,511	
October 15	at South Carolina	Carolina Stadium; Columbia, SC	W 10–6	26,593	
October 22	at North Carolina	Kenan Memorial Stadium; Chapel Hill, NC (rivalry)	W 3–0	37,000	
October 29	Clemson	Bowman Gray Stadium; Winston-Salem, NC	L 21–23	15,700	
November 5	Virginia Tech*	Bowman Gray Stadium; Winston-Salem, NC	L 0–11	13,000	
November 12	Memphis State*	Bowman Gray Stadium; Winston-Salem, NC	W 21–7	8,000	
November 19	at Florida State*	Doak Campbell Stadium; Tallahassee, FL	L 0–28	29,176	
*Non-conference game

== Team leaders ==
Category	Team Leader	Att/Cth	Yds
Passing	Ken Erickson	57/126	787
Rushing	Andy Heck	127	608
Receiving	Ken Henry	20	279
