= 1966 Arkansas Razorbacks football team =

American college football season

1966 Arkansas Razorbacks football
- Conference: Southwest Conference

Ranking
- Coaches: No. 13
- Record: 8–2 (5–2 SWC)
- Head coach: Frank Broyles (9th season)
- Offensive scheme: Multiple
- Defensive coordinator: Charlie Coffey (1st season)
- Base defense: 4–3
- Captain: Seniors
- Home stadium: Razorback Stadium; War Memorial Stadium

1966 Southwest Conference football standings
	Conf.					Overall
Team	W		L		T	W		L		T
No. 10 SMU $	6	–	1	–	0	8	–	3	–	0
Arkansas	5	–	2	–	0	8	–	2	–	0
Texas	5	–	2	–	0	7	–	4	–	0
Texas A&M	4	–	3	–	0	4	–	5	–	1
Baylor	3	–	4	–	0	5	–	5	–	0
Texas Tech	2	–	5	–	0	4	–	6	–	0
TCU	2	–	5	–	0	2	–	8	–	0
Rice	1	–	6	–	0	2	–	8	–	0
$ – Conference champion; Rankings from AP Poll

The 1966 Arkansas Razorbacks football team represented the University of Arkansas in the Southwest Conference (SWC) during the 1966 NCAA University Division football season. In their ninth year under head coach Frank Broyles, the Razorbacks compiled an 8–2 record (5–2 against SWC opponents), finished in a tie for second place in the SWC, and outscored all opponents by a combined total of 218 to 73.

Arkansas defensive tackle Loyd Phillips and defensive back Martine Bercher were selected as first-team players on the 1965 College Football All-America Team. Phillips finished ninth in the Heisman Trophy voting and won the Outland Trophy, awarded to the best interior lineman in the land. Bercher gained an average of 15.5 yards per punt return, the fifth-best mark in the nation. The Arkansas defense gave up the seventh-lowest point total per game, 7.3.

Shocking losses to Baylor and Texas Tech prevented Arkansas from its third consecutive berth in the Cotton Bowl Classic. The Razorbacks' 21-16 loss to the Red Raiders at Lubbock in the season finale handed the Cotton Bowl berth to SMU, which Arkansas defeated 22-0 in Fayetteville the week before blowing it vs. Tech.

== Schedule ==
Date	Opponent	Rank	Site	TV	Result	Attendance	Source
September 17	Oklahoma State*	No. 5	War Memorial Stadium; Little Rock, AR		W 14–10	47,000	
September 24	Tulsa*	No. 6	Razorback Stadium; Fayetteville, AR		W 27–8	41,000	
October 1	at TCU	No. 7	Amon G. Carter Stadium; Fort Worth, TX		W 21–0	44,415	
October 8	Baylor	No. 9	Razorback Stadium; Fayetteville, AR		L 0–7	39,518	
October 15	at Texas		Memorial Stadium; Austin, TX (rivalry)	NBC	W 12–7	66,000	
October 22	Wichita State*		War Memorial Stadium; Little Rock, AR		W 41–0	42,000	
October 29	at Texas A&M	No. 9	Kyle Field; College Station, TX (rivalry)		W 34–0	40,000	
November 5	Rice	No. 8	War Memorial Stadium; Little Rock, AR		W 31–20	47,000	
November 12	SMU	No. 6	Razorback Stadium; Fayetteville, AR		W 22–0	42,000	
November 19	at Texas Tech	No. 6	Jones Stadium; Lubbock, TX (rivalry)		L 16–21	34,565	
*Non-conference game; Rankings from AP Poll released prior to the game

== Game summaries ==
=== Texas ===
Team	1	2	3	4	Total
• Arkansas	3	3	6	0	12
Texas	0	7	0	0	7

- Date: October 15
- Location: Texas Memorial Stadium, Austin, Texas
- Game attendance: 65,000
- Television network: Regional

Scoring summary
1	ARK	Bob White 22-yard field goal	ARK 3-0
2	ARK	Bob White 37-yard field goal	ARK 6-0
2	TEX	Chris Gilbert 1-yard run (Brett Conway kick)	TEX 7-6
3	ARK	Tommy Burnett 22-yard pass from Jon Brittenum (run failed)	ARK 12-7

Arkansas' third consecutive victory over Texas.
