= 1966 SMU Mustangs football team =

American college football season

1966 SMU Mustangs football

SWC champion

Cotton Bowl Classic, L 9–24 vs. Georgia
- Conference: Southwest Conference

Ranking
- Coaches: No. 9
- AP: No. 10
- Record: 8–3 (6–1 SWC)
- Head coach: Hayden Fry (5th season)
- Home stadium: Cotton Bowl

1966 Southwest Conference football standings
	Conf.					Overall
Team	W		L		T	W		L		T
No. 10 SMU $	6	–	1	–	0	8	–	3	–	0
Arkansas	5	–	2	–	0	8	–	2	–	0
Texas	5	–	2	–	0	7	–	4	–	0
Texas A&M	4	–	3	–	0	4	–	5	–	1
Baylor	3	–	4	–	0	5	–	5	–	0
Texas Tech	2	–	5	–	0	4	–	6	–	0
TCU	2	–	5	–	0	2	–	8	–	0
Rice	1	–	6	–	0	2	–	8	–	0
$ – Conference champion; Rankings from AP Poll

The 1966 SMU Mustangs football team represented Southern Methodist University (SMU) as a member of the Southwest Conference (SWC) during the 1966 NCAA University Division football season. Led by fifth-year head coach Hayden Fry, the Mustangs compiled an overall record of 8–3 with a conference mark of 6–1, winning the SWC title.

The Mustangs seemingly blew their chances at the SWC championship with a 22–0 loss on November 12 at Arkansas, the two-time reigning SWC champion. However, SMU's title hopes reopened by Texas Tech, which upended the Razorbacks, 21–16 in Arkansas' season finale on November 19. Seven days later, SMU shut out rival TCU, 21–0.

SMU earned a berth in the Cotton Bowl Classic, played in their home stadium, the Cotton Bowl. The Mustangs lost the game to Georgia on New Year's Eve.

== Schedule ==
Date	Opponent	Rank	Site	TV	Result	Attendance	Source
September 17	Illinois*		Cotton Bowl; Dallas, TX		W 26–7	28,000	
September 24	Navy*		Cotton Bowl; Dallas, TX (rivalry)		W 21–3	58,000	
October 1	at Purdue*		Ross–Ade Stadium; West Lafayette, IN		L 23–35	46,116	
October 15	Rice		Cotton Bowl; Dallas, TX (rivalry)		W 28–24	30,000	
October 22	at Texas Tech		Jones Stadium; Lubbock, TX		W 24–7	40,350	
October 29	at Texas		Memorial Stadium; Austin, TX		W 13–12	58,500	
November 5	Texas A&M		Cotton Bowl; Dallas, TX		W 21–14	53,000	
November 12	at No. 6 Arkansas		Razorback Stadium; Fayetteville, AR		L 0–22	42,000	
November 19	Baylor		Cotton Bowl; Dallas, TX		W 24–22	30,000	
November 26	at TCU		Amon G. Carter Stadium; Fort Worth, TX (rivalry)		W 21–0	30,757	
December 31	vs. No. 4 Georgia*	No. 10	Cotton Bowl; Dallas, TX (Cotton Bowl Classic)	CBS	L 9–24	75,504	
*Non-conference game; Rankings from AP Poll released prior to the game

== Roster ==
1966 SMU Mustangs football team roster
Players
Coaches
Offense

Pos.	#	Name	Class
WR	23	Jerry LeVias	So
QB	18	Mike Livingston	Jr
RB	24	Mike Richardson	So

Defense

Pos.	#	Name	Class

Special teams

Pos.	#	Name	Class
K	3	Dennis Partee	Jr

Head coach

- Hayden Fry

Coordinators/assistant coaches

Legend

- (C) Team captain
- (S) Suspended
- (I) Ineligible
- Injured
- Redshirt
