= 1966 Bluebonnet Bowl =

Ole Miss Rebels	Texas Longhorns
(8–2)	(6–4)
0	19
Head coach: Johnny Vaught	Head coach: Darrell Royal
AP / Coaches; NR / 12
	1	2	3	4	Total
Ole Miss	0	0	0	0	0
Texas	6	0	6	7	19
- Date: December 17, 1966
- Season: 1966
- Stadium: Rice Stadium
- Location: Houston, Texas
- Attendance: 67,000

United States TV coverage
- Network: ABC

The 1966 Bluebonnet Bowl was a college football postseason bowl game between the Texas Longhorns and the Ole Miss Rebels.

== Background ==
Ole Miss finished 4th in the Southeastern Conference for the second straight year in a row. This was the Rebels' 10th straight bowl appearance and first Bluebonnet Bowl since 1964. The Longhorns finished 3rd in the Southwest Conference, attending a bowl game after a two season wait.

== Game summary ==
On the three touchdowns, the Longhorns had drives of 89, 68, and 53 yards, while limiting the Rebels to barely over 200 yards. Bill Bradley started the scoring on his 25 yard touchdown run to give them a 6-0 lead. Ole Miss tried to narrow the lead with a Jimmy Keyes field goal from 43 yards out. However, the kick went wide, keeping it 6-0. Chris Gilbert made it 12-0 in the second half with his touchdown sneak. Later in the quarter, the Rebels were stopped on 4th down at the Longhorn 8. Bradley ran for his second touchdown of the day to make it 19-0, as Texas coasted from there to win. Chris Gilbert ran for 156 yards on 26 carries, while Bradley ran for 105 yards on 20 carries, while passing for 49 yards.

== Aftermath ==
While the Longhorns did not make a bowl game the next season, they made six straight Cotton Bowl Classic appearances, while returning to the Bluebonnet Bowl in 1975. As for Ole Miss, they never returned to the Bluebonnet Bowl, though they kept making bowl games, making four in Vaught's final four seasons.

== Statistics ==
Statistics	Ole Miss	Texas
First downs	7	19
Rushing yards	143	285
Passing yards	65	95
Total yards	208	380
Passing (C–A–I)	10–26–4	5–17–4
Punts–average	7–28.4	3–42.0
Fumbles–lost	0–0	3–3
Penalties–yards	8–84	4–34
