= Clarence Underwood =

American football player and coach (1912–1985)

Biographical details
- Born: October 3, 1912; Beckley, West Virginia
- Died: December 22, 1985 (aged 73); Houston, Texas

Playing career
- 1933–1935: Marshall University
- Position: Guard

Coaching career (HC unless noted)
- 1938–1941: Woodrow Wilson HS (assistant)
- 1942: Woodrow Wilson HS
- 1948–1957: Kentucky (assistant)
- 1957–1966: Thomas Jefferson HS
- 1966–1977: Kentucky (assistant)

Clarence "Buckshot" Underwood (October 3, 1912 – December 22, 1985) was an American football coach.

== Early life ==
Underwood played football player at Woodrow Wilson High School in Beckley, West Virginia. He played tackle and fullback where the coaches referred to him, “as one of the greatest gridders ever turned out by Woodrow Wilson.” He was awarded a gold football by Woodrow Wilson, an honor rarely attained. Upon graduation from Woodrow Wilson, “Red” (a nickname he picked up while in high school) entered the Oak Ridge Military Academy in North Carolina, where he played football and boxed. After one year at the military academy, Red enrolled at Marshall College (now Marshall University), Huntington, West Virginia, in 1934. Red made the Buckeye Conference All-Star Team where he played guard all three years. During his time at Marshall, Red continued his boxing career, leading Marshall to several conference titles.

== Military ==
Clarence Underwood served in the United States Navy from December 22, 1942, until his honorable discharge on February 23, 1946. Lt. Underwood served for over four years in the Asiatic-Pacific Area, where he received the World War II Victory Medal.

== Coaching career ==
=== Woodrow Wilson High School ===
In the fall of 1938, Clarence Underwood became an assistant coach at Woodrow Wilson High School in Beckley, West Virginia, his hometown, under the nationally known head coach Jerome Van Meter. Clarence served as the head coach during the 1942 season.

=== University of Kentucky ===
In 1948 after serving in the US Navy, and still using the nickname "Red," Clarence Underwood began serving as an Assistant Line Coach at the University of Kentucky, under Paul "Bear" Bryant. He quickly rose to Head Line Coach. In addition to coaching under Bear Bryant, Red refined his career at Kentucky under Coach Blanton Collier. Red was at the University of Kentucky for just over seven years, and during that time, under Coaches Bryant and Collier, Kentucky won three Southeastern Conference championships and played in the 1950 Orange Bowl, won the 1951 Sugar Bowl, and the 1952 Cotton Bowl Classic.

While he served as Head Line Coach at Kentucky, Coach Underwood received is masters in secondary education (1951) and took responsibility for academic and disciplinary issues affecting the football team. It was during this time coaching that Bear Bryant and Blanton Collier changed Red's nickname to “Buckshot.”

=== Thomas Jefferson High School ===
On December 16, 1956, Coach Underwood wrote to the superintendent of schools in Port Arthur, Texas, indicating his interest in the head football coaching job at Port Arthur High School. On February 29, 1957, Buckshot was officially installed as the head coach and director of physical education at Thomas Jefferson HS, in Port Arthur, Texas. Shortly thereafter, Coach Underwood joined the Texas High School Coaches Association (THSCA).

Buckshot took his Thomas Jefferson High School team to the state finals in 1957 against Highland Park High School, in Dallas, Texas. That same year, 1957, he was named Texas High School Coach of the Year, and was granted the honor of serving as chairman of the Hall of Honor Selection Committee. During his time with the association, he served on the THSCA board of directors. During this same time, Buckshot was the representative of high school coaches on the NCAA Rules Committee for a period of four years. In 1960, he was selected as head coach of the South All-Star team.

After 10 years at Thomas Jefferson High School, Buckshot returned to the University of Kentucky in 1966 where he continued to coach until 1977.

Coach Underwood love the game of football. In 1981 he coached the 8th grade football at Strack Intermediate School in the Klein ISD school district.

== Personal ==
Buckshot enjoyed writing and produced articles for various football magazines, usually on defensive strategy and tactics. He was credited to be the first coach to install the 27 defense.

Edith Smith, daughter of Charles and Rosa Smith, met Coach Underwood on a blind date in Beckley, West Virginia. The two were married after only four months of dating, eloping to Jackson, Tennessee, in 1940. Edith and Buckshot had three daughters, Janet, Nancy and Barbara.

Buckshot retired from the University of Kentucky in 1977 and returned to Texas to teach and serve as an assistant coach in the Klein School District where he renewed his membership with the THSCA. When Buckshot died in 1985 he was serving as a volunteer coach at Tomball High School.

== Honors ==
Texas High School Coach of the Year, 1957

Sixteen (16) years of active membership with the Texas High School Coaches Association (THSCA)

Coach Herbert Allen, of Klein, Texas, nominated Buckshot for the Texas High School Coaches Hall of Honor Induction, November 1984

Inclusion into the Hall of Honor of the Texas High School Coaches Association, July 2013
