= 1966 Gator Bowl =

American college football game

Tennessee Volunteers	Syracuse Orangemen
(7-3)	(8-2)
SEC	Independent
18	12
Head coach: Doug Dickey	Head coach: Ben Schwartzwalder
AP / Coaches; NR / 14	AP / Coaches; NR / 16
	1	2	3	4	Total
Tennessee	3	15	0	0	18
Syracuse	0	0	6	6	12
- Date: December 31, 1966
- Season: 1966
- Stadium: Gator Bowl Stadium
- Location: Jacksonville, Florida
- MVP: Dewey Warren (QB, Tennessee) & Floyd Little (HB, Syracuse)
- Referee: Pat McHugh (SEC; (split crew: SEC, ECAC)
- Attendance: 60,312

United States TV coverage
- Network: ABC
- Announcers: Chris Schenkel; Bud Wilkinson; Bill Flemming

The 1966 Gator Bowl was a college football postseason bowl game that featured the Tennessee Volunteers and the Syracuse Orangemen.

== Background ==
The Volunteers had finished fifth in the Southeastern Conference, with an 11–10 loss to #3 Alabama being especially damaging. Nevertheless, they were invited to their second straight bowl appearance, the first time they had made consecutive bowls since 1956–57. This was the first Gator Bowl for either team. As for the Orangemen, they were making their fourth bowl appearance in the decade.

== Game summary ==
Gary Wright kicked two 38 yard field goals to make it 6–0, and Dewey Warren threw touchdown passes to Austin Denney and Richmond Flowers to make it 18–0 at halftime. On the first drive of the second half, Larry Csonka scored on an 8-yard touchdown plunge to make it 18–6 (after a failed conversion play). With only 46 seconds left in the game, Floyd Little made it 18–12 on a 3-yard touchdown plunge (with another failed conversion play), but it wasn't enough. Little (216 on 29 carries) and Csonka (114 on 18 carries) combined for 330 yards rushing in losing efforts. Warren 17-of-29 for 244 yards.

== Aftermath ==
The Vols returned to the Gator Bowl three years later. The Orangemen did not play in a bowl game again for 13 years. They returned to the Gator Bowl 30 years later.

== Statistics ==
Statistics	Tennessee	Syracuse
First downs	14	20
Rushing yards	85	348
Passing yards	244	16
Total yards	329	364
Passes intercepted	1	3
Punts–average	3/43	2/39.5
Fumbles–lost	2–2	3–1
Penalties–yards	4–44	7–79
