= Kent Lawrence =

American football player (1947–2020)

No. 12, 24
- Position: Wide receiver

Personal information
- Born: June 3, 1947; Anderson, South Carolina, U.S.
- Died: March 13, 2020 (aged 72); Athens, Georgia, U.S.
- Listed height: 6 ft 0 in (1.83 m)
- Listed weight: 180 lb (82 kg)

Career information
- High school: Central (SC) D. W. Daniel
- College: Georgia (1965-1968)
- NFL draft: 1969: 9th round, 211th overall pick

Career history
- Philadelphia Eagles (1969); Atlanta Falcons (1970)

Awards and highlights
- Second-team All-SEC (1968)

Career NFL statistics
- Receptions: 1
- Receiving yards: 10
- Return yards: 123
- Stats at Pro Football Reference

Kent Lawrence (June 3, 1947 – March 13, 2020) was an American football wide receiver. He played for the Philadelphia Eagles in 1969 and for the Atlanta Falcons in 1970.

Lawrence competed as a sprinter for the Georgia Bulldogs track and field team, setting a school record 9.5 seconds over 100 yards.

He died on March 13, 2020, in Athens, Georgia at age 72.
