= Leslie Kelley =

American football player (born 1944)

Les Kelley
No. 30
- Position: Linebacker

Personal information
- Born: December 9, 1944 (age 81); Decatur, Alabama, U.S.
- Listed height: 6 ft 3 in (1.91 m)
- Listed weight: 233 lb (106 kg)

Career information
- High school: Cullman (AL)
- College: Alabama (1963-1966)
- NFL draft: 1967: 1st round, 26th overall pick

Career history
- New Orleans Saints (1967–1969)

Awards and highlights
- 2× National champion (1964, 1965)

Career NFL statistics
- Fumble recoveries: 2
- Interceptions: 1
- Stats at Pro Football Reference

Leslie Howard Kelley (born December 9, 1944) is an American former professional football player who was a linebacker for the New Orleans Saints of the National Football League (NFL). He played college football for the Alabama Crimson Tide and played three seasons in the NFL without ever starting.

He was the first ever draft choice of the Saints, taken with the final pick of the first round in the 1967 draft. The Saints originally had the #1 overall pick in that draft, but traded it to the Baltimore Colts for quarterback Gary Cuozzo. The Colts selected Michigan State All-America defensive end Bubba Smith with the traded pick.
