= Dewey Warren =

American football player (born 1945)

No. 16, 12
- Position: Quarterback

Personal information
- Born: May 7, 1945 (age 81); Savannah, Georgia, U.S.
- Listed height: 6 ft 0 in (1.83 m)
- Listed weight: 205 lb (93 kg)

Career information
- High school: Herschel V. Jenkins (Savannah)
- College: Tennessee (1964-1967)
- NFL draft: 1968: 6th round, 155th overall pick

Career history
- Cincinnati Bengals (1968); Las Vegas Cowboys (1969)

Awards and highlights
- Second-team All-SEC (1966)

Career AFL statistics
- Passing attempts: 80
- Passing completions: 47
- Completion percentage: 58.8%
- TD–INT: 1–4
- Passing yards: 506
- Passer rating: 60.7
- Stats at Pro Football Reference

Madison Dewey Warren (born May 7, 1945) is an American former professional football player who was a quarterback for the Cincinnati Bengals of the American Football League (AFL). He played college football for the Tennessee Volunteers. Warren was nicknamed "the Swamp Rat" due to his early years growing up near the marshlands of the Vernon River in Georgia.

== College career ==
In three seasons with Warren as the starting quarterback of the Tennessee Volunteers, their record was 19–6. He was the first UT quarterback to pass for more than a 1,000 yards in a season.

During his sophomore season, he led the Vols to a win against the Rose Bowl-bound UCLA Bruins and a berth in the Bluebonnet Bowl.

Before Warren took over as quarterback, Tennessee's single-season records were 75 passing attempts, 36 completions (by Johnny Majors in the 1950s), and 552 yards. Under coach Doug Dickey's wide-open T-formation offense, in 1966, Warren threw 229 passes with 136 completions and 1,716 yards.

Warren led Tennessee to an 8–3 record in that transformational 1966 season, followed by an 18–12 win over Syracuse University in the 1966 Gator Bowl, for which he was named the game's MVP. The following year, the Vols went 9–2, won the Southeastern Conference championship and were recognized by Litkenhous as national champions before a 26–24 loss to the University of Oklahoma in the Orange Bowl. He finished eighth in the voting for the 1967 Heisman Trophy.

Warren ended his UT career with 3,357 yards passing and 27 touchdowns.

== Professional career ==
Warren was selected in the sixth round (155th overall) of the 1968 NFL/AFL Draft.

He spent one season with the American Football League's Cincinnati Bengals in the team's expansion year, playing in seven games in 1968 and starting three. Sharing time with Bengals quarterbacks John Stofa and Sam Wyche, Warren completed 47 passes in 80 attempts (58.8 percent) for 506 yards and one touchdown. In 1969, Warren played for the Las Vegas Cowboys of the Continental Football League.

== Coaching career ==
Warren coached at Brigham Young University, Kansas State University, Tennessee, and the University of the South.

Warren was instrumental in revolutionizing college football under LaVell Edwards at Brigham Young. Edwards, who had spent his career as a defensive coach, became head coach in 1972; he knew that BYU lacked the blue-chip athletes necessary to win consistently with a conventional run-oriented game, so handed the offense to Warren, who had been hired to install a passing attack.

Warren's offense turned every running play into a passing play, and overwhelmed defenses with four and five receivers, coming from every possible position in the offense. Although Warren left BYU after only two seasons, his offense, led by quarterback Gary Sheide, was already setting records. BYU continues to use his offense, with further refinements, today.

== Personal ==
Warren is now the host of a sports talk radio show in Knoxville, Tennessee, where he lives, and also plays in charity golf tournaments.

== See also ==
- List of NCAA major college football yearly passing leaders
- Other American Football League players
