= 1966 South Carolina Gamecocks football team =

American college football season

1966 South Carolina Gamecocks football
- Conference: Atlantic Coast Conference
- Record: 1–9 (1–3 ACC)
- Head coach: Paul Dietzel (1st season)
- Captain: Bobby Bryant
- Home stadium: Carolina Stadium

1966 Atlantic Coast Conference football standings
	Conf.					Overall
Team	W		L		T	W		L		T
Clemson $	6	–	1	–	0	6	–	4	–	0
NC State	5	–	2	–	0	5	–	5	–	0
Maryland	3	–	3	–	0	4	–	6	–	0
Virginia	3	–	3	–	0	4	–	6	–	0
Duke	2	–	3	–	0	5	–	5	–	0
Wake Forest	2	–	4	–	0	3	–	7	–	0
South Carolina	1	–	3	–	0	1	–	9	–	0
North Carolina	1	–	4	–	0	2	–	8	–	0
$ – Conference champion

The 1966 South Carolina Gamecocks football team represented the University of South Carolina as a member of the Atlantic Coast Conference (ACC) during the 1966 NCAA University Division football season. Led by first-year head coach Paul Dietzel, the Gamecocks compiled an overall record of 1–9 with a mark of 1–3 in conference play, placing seventh in the ACC. The team played home games at Carolina Stadium in Columbia, South Carolina.

Dietzel, who had coached LSU to a national championship in 1958 and Southeastern Conference (SEC) titles in 1958 and 1961, became South Carolina's coach after four seasons at Army. Dietzel's first game leading the Gamecocks was on the road against his former team, LSU, with the Tigers winning, 28–12. Dietzel had suggested that LSU should schedule a four-game series with South Carolina when he was still the Tigers' head coach.

Dietzel's first season also saw the introduction of the gamecock logo to South Carolina's helmets, and it has remained almost continuously ever since.

In South Carolina's only win of the season, against NC State, defensive back and team captain Bobby Bryant returned a punt 98 yards for a touchdown, setting a program record for longest punt return.

== Schedule ==
Date	Opponent	Site	Result	Attendance	Source
September 17	at LSU*	Tiger Stadium; Baton Rouge, LA	L 12–28	67,512	
September 24	Memphis State*	Carolina Stadium; Columbia, SC	L 7–16	24,404	
October 1	Georgia*	Carolina Stadium; Columbia, SC (rivalry)	L 0–7	31,141	
October 8	at NC State	Carter Stadium; Raleigh, NC	W 31–21	35,200	
October 15	Wake Forest	Carolina Stadium; Columbia, SC	L 6–10	26,593	
October 22	at Tennessee*	Neyland Stadium; Knoxville, TN (rivalry)	L 17–29	38,944	
October 29	at Maryland	Byrd Stadium; College Park, MD	L 2–14	35,400	
November 5	Florida State*	Carolina Stadium; Columbia, SC	L 10–32	29,286	
November 12	at No. 3 Alabama*	Denny Stadium; Tuscaloosa, AL	L 0–24	57,282–59,500	
November 26	at Clemson	Memorial Stadium; Clemson, SC (rivalry)	L 10–35	47,237	
*Non-conference game; Rankings from AP Poll released prior to the game
