= 1966 North Carolina Tar Heels football team =

American college football season

1966 North Carolina Tar Heels football
- Conference: Atlantic Coast Conference
- Record: 2–8 (1–4 ACC)
- Head coach: Jim Hickey (8th season)
- Captains: Bob Hume; Hank Sadler; Danny Talbott
- Home stadium: Kenan Memorial Stadium

1966 Atlantic Coast Conference football standings
	Conf.					Overall
Team	W		L		T	W		L		T
Clemson $	6	–	1	–	0	6	–	4	–	0
NC State	5	–	2	–	0	5	–	5	–	0
Maryland	3	–	3	–	0	4	–	6	–	0
Virginia	3	–	3	–	0	4	–	6	–	0
Duke	2	–	3	–	0	5	–	5	–	0
Wake Forest	2	–	4	–	0	3	–	7	–	0
South Carolina	1	–	3	–	0	1	–	9	–	0
North Carolina	1	–	4	–	0	2	–	8	–	0
$ – Conference champion

The 1966 North Carolina Tar Heels football team represented the University of North Carolina at Chapel Hill during the 1966 NCAA University Division football season. The Tar Heels were led by eighth-year head coach Jim Hickey and played their home games at Kenan Memorial Stadium in Chapel Hill, North Carolina.

== Schedule ==
Date	Time	Opponent	Site	Result	Attendance	Source
September 17	8:00 p.m.	at Kentucky*	McLean Stadium; Lexington, KY	L 0–10	37,599	
September 24	1:30 p.m.	NC State	Kenan Memorial Stadium; Chapel Hill, NC (rivalry)	W 10–7	46,000	
October 1	1:30 p.m.	at No. 8 Michigan*	Michigan Stadium; Ann Arbor, MI	W 21–7	88,233	
October 15	1:30 p.m.	at No. 2 Notre Dame*	Notre Dame Stadium; Notre Dame, IN (rivalry)	L 0–32	59,075	
October 22	1:30 p.m.	Wake Forest	Kenan Memorial Stadium; Chapel Hill, NC (rivalry)	L 0–3	37,000	
October 29	2:00 p.m.	at Georgia*	Sanford Stadium; Athens, GA	L 3–28	45,321	
November 5	2:00 p.m.	at Clemson	Memorial Stadium; Clemson, SC	L 3–27	33,000	
November 12	1:30 p.m.	Air Force*	Kenan Memorial Stadium; Chapel Hill, NC	L 14–20	31,000	
November 19	1:30 p.m.	Duke	Kenan Memorial Stadium; Chapel Hill, NC (Victory Bell)	L 25–41	46,000	
November 26	1:30 p.m.	Virginia	Kenan Memorial Stadium; Chapel Hill, NC (South's Oldest Rivalry)	L 14–21	25,000	
*Non-conference game; Rankings from AP Poll released prior to the game; All times are in Eastern time
