= 1966 NCAA University Division football rankings =

- Season: 1966
- Bowl season: 1966–67 bowl games
- Preseason No. 1: Alabama
- End of season champions: Notre Dame

Two human polls comprised the 1966 NCAA University Division football rankings. Unlike most sports, college football's governing body, the NCAA, does not bestow a national championship, instead that title is bestowed by one or more different polling agencies. There are two main weekly polls that begin in the preseason—the AP Poll and the Coaches Poll.

== Legend ==
	Increase in ranking
	Decrease in ranking
	Not ranked previous week
	National champion
(#–#)	Win–loss record
(Italics)	Number of first place votes
т	Tied with team above or below also with this symbol

== AP Poll ==
The final AP Poll was released in early December, at the end of the 1966 regular season. In the previous season, the final poll was released in January for the first time, after the bowl games, but not in 1966 or 1967.

The AP Poll ranked only the top ten teams from 1962 through 1967.

	Preseason Aug	Week 1 Sep 19	Week 2 Sep 26	Week 3 Oct 3	Week 4 Oct 10	Week 5 Oct 17	Week 6 Oct 24	Week 7 Oct 31	Week 8 Nov 7	Week 9 Nov 14	Week 10 Nov 21	Week 11 Nov 28	Week 12 (Final) Dec 5	
1.	Alabama (15)	Michigan State (1–0) (12)	Michigan State (2–0) (22)	Michigan State (3–0) (20)	Michigan State (4–0) (18)	Notre Dame (4–0) (31)	Notre Dame (5–0) (32)	Notre Dame (6–0) (39)	Notre Dame (7–0) (32)	Notre Dame (8–0) (35)	Notre Dame (8–0–1) (37)	Notre Dame (9–0–1) (40)	Notre Dame (9–0–1) (41)	1.
2.	Michigan State (12)	UCLA (1–0) (13)	UCLA (2–0) (11)	UCLA (3–0) (7)	Notre Dame (3–0) (15)	Michigan State (5–0) (10)	Michigan State (6–0) (5)	Michigan State (7–0) (6)	Michigan State (8–0) (10)	Michigan State (9–0) (6)	Michigan State (9–0–1) (27)	Michigan State (9–0–1) (10)	Michigan State (9–0–1) (8)	2.
3.	Nebraska (2)	Alabama (0–0) (10)	Alabama (1–0) (2)	Notre Dame (2–0) (8)	Alabama (3–0) (4)	UCLA (5–0) (3)	UCLA (6–0) (2)	UCLA (7–0) (3)	Alabama (7–0)	Alabama (8–0) (1)	Alabama (8–0) (8)	Alabama (9–0) (7)	Alabama (10–0) (7)	3.
4.	UCLA (6)	Nebraska (1–0)	Notre Dame (1–0) (2)	Alabama (2–0) (3)	UCLA (4–0) (2)	Alabama (4–0) (2)	Alabama (5–0) (1)	Alabama (6–0) (1)	Nebraska (8–0)	Nebraska (9–0)	Nebraska (9–0) (1)	Georgia (9–1)	Georgia (9–1)	4.
5.	Arkansas	USC (1–0) (2)	USC (2–0) (1)	Arkansas (3–0) (2)	USC (4–0) (1)	USC (5–0) (1)	USC (6–0) (1)	Georgia Tech (7–0)	Georgia Tech (8–0)	Georgia Tech (9–0)	Georgia Tech (9–0)	UCLA (9–1)	UCLA (9–1)	5.
6.	Notre Dame	Arkansas (1–0) (1)	Nebraska (2–0)	USC (3–0) (1)	Nebraska (4–0)	Georgia Tech (5–0)	Georgia Tech (6–0)	Nebraska (7–0)	Arkansas (7–1) (1)	Arkansas (8–1) (1)	UCLA (9–1)	Nebraska (9–1)	Nebraska (9–1)	6.
7.	Syracuse	Purdue (1–0)	Arkansas (2–0) (1)	Nebraska (3–0)	Georgia Tech (4–0)	Nebraska (5–0)	Florida (6–0)	Florida (7–0)	USC (7–1)	USC (7–1)	Georgia (8–1)	Purdue (8–2)	Purdue (8–2)	7.
8.	Purdue	Notre Dame (0–0) (1)	Michigan (2–0) (1)	Tennessee (2–0)	Florida (4–0)	Florida (5–0)	Nebraska (6–0)	Arkansas (6–1)	UCLA (7–1)	UCLA (8–1)	Purdue (8–2)	Georgia Tech (9–1)	Georgia Tech (9–1)	8.
9.	USC	Michigan (1–0) (1)	Georgia Tech (2–0)	Georgia Tech (3–0)	Purdue (3–1)	Purdue (4–1)	Arkansas (5–1)	USC (6–1)	Georgia (7–1)	Georgia (8–1)	Florida (8–1)	Miami (FL) (7–2–1)	Miami (FL) (7–2–1)	9.
10.	Tennessee	Baylor (1–0) (1)	Tennessee (1–0)	Florida (3–0)	Baylor (3–1)	Oklahoma (4–0)	Wyoming (6–0)	Tennessee (4–2)	Tennessee (5–2)	Purdue (7–2)	USC (7–2)	SMU (8–2)	SMU (8–2)	10.
	Preseason Aug	Week 1 Sep 19	Week 2 Sep 26	Week 3 Oct 3	Week 4 Oct 10	Week 5 Oct 17	Week 6 Oct 24	Week 7 Oct 31	Week 8 Nov 7	Week 9 Nov 14	Week 10 Nov 21	Week 11 Nov 28	Week 12 (Final) Dec 5	
		Dropped: Syracuse; Tennessee	Dropped: Baylor; Purdue	Dropped: Michigan	Dropped: Arkansas; Tennessee	Dropped: Baylor	Dropped: Oklahoma; Purdue	Dropped: Wyoming	Dropped: Florida	Dropped: Tennessee	Dropped: Arkansas	Dropped: Florida; USC	None	

== Final Coaches Poll ==
The final UPI Coaches Poll was released prior to the bowl games, in late November.
Notre Dame received twenty of the 35 first-place votes; Michigan State received ten, Alabama four, and UCLA one.

Ranking	Team	Conference	Bowl
1	Notre Dame	Independent	none
2	Michigan State	Big Ten	none
3	Alabama	SEC	Won Sugar, 34–7
4	Georgia	SEC	Won Cotton, 24–9
5	UCLA	AAWU (Pac-8)	none
6	Purdue	Big Ten	Won Rose, 14–13
7	Nebraska	Big Eight	Lost Sugar, 7–34
8	Georgia Tech	Independent	Lost Orange, 12–27
9	SMU	Southwest	Lost Cotton, 9–24
10	Miami (FL)	Independent	Won Liberty, 14–7
11	Florida	SEC	Won Orange, 27–12
12	Mississippi	SEC	Lost Bluebonnet, 0–19
13	Arkansas	Southwest	none
14	Tennessee	SEC	Won Gator, 18–12
15	Wyoming	WAC	Won Sun, 28–20
16	Syracuse	Independent	Lost Gator, 12–18
17	Houston	Independent	none
18	USC	AAWU (Pac-8)	Lost Rose, 13–14
19	Oregon State	AAWU (Pac-8)	none
20	Virginia Tech	Independent	Lost Liberty, 7–14

- Notre Dame did not participate in bowl games from 1925 through 1968.
- Prior to the 1975 season, the Big Ten and Pac-8 conferences allowed only one postseason participant each, for the Rose Bowl.
  - Big Ten champion Michigan State was barred from participation in the Rose Bowl due to the conference's no-repeat rule, in effect from 1946 through 1971.
- The Ivy League has prohibited its members from participating in postseason football since the league was officially formed in 1954.
