= Bert Clark =

American gridiron football player and coach (1930–2004)

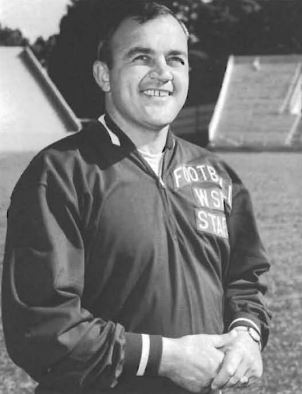
- Clark from the 1967 Chinook

Biographical details
- Born: February 12, 1930; Wichita Falls, Texas, U.S.
- Died: December 13, 2004 (aged 74); Katy, Texas, U.S.

Playing career
- 1949–1951: Oklahoma
- 1952: Dallas Texans
- 1953: Calgary Stampeders
- Positions: Linebacker, center

Coaching career (HC unless noted)
- 1956: Arkansas (assistant)
- 1957–1963: Washington (assistant)
- 1964–1967: Washington State
- 1968–1969: New Mexico (assistant)
- 1970–?: Winnipeg Blue Bombers (assistant)

Head coaching record
- Overall: 15–24–1

Accomplishments and honors

Championships
- National (1950)

Awards
- First-team All-Big Seven (1951); Second-team All-Big Seven (1950)

Robert B. Clark Jr. (February 12, 1930 – December 13, 2004) was an American gridiron football player and coach. He was the head football coach at Washington State University for four seasons, from 1964 to 1967.

== Early life and playing career ==
Born in Wichita Falls, Texas, Clark graduated from high school in 1948 and played college football at the University of Oklahoma under coach Bud Wilkinson. He lettered three seasons, from 1949] to 1951, as the Sooners posted records of 11–0, 10–1, and 8–2. Clark was a two-time All-Big Eight Conference linebacker and helped the 1950 Sooners capture a national title.

After a brief stint with the Dallas Texas of the National Football League (NFL) in 1952 and a season with the Calgary Stampeders of the Canadian Football League (CFL) in 1953, Clark served in the United States Army.

== Assistant coach ==
Following his military service, he was an assistant coach for a season at the University of Arkansas in 1956 under former Sooner Jack Mitchell, and then joined the staff of first-year head coach Jim Owens at the University of Washington in Seattle in 1957. Owens and Clark were teammates at Oklahoma in their undefeated 1949 season.

== Washington State ==
After seven seasons in Seattle with Owens at Washington, he was hired as head coach at Washington State in Pullman in January 1964; his initial contract was a three-year deal for $16,500 per year.

On the Palouse, he was near another former 1949 Sooner teammate, Dee Andros, who was in his third (and final) season as head coach of the Idaho Vandals, eight miles (13 km) to the east. Clark's first WSU team lost both rivalry games, expectedly to Washington in the Apple Cup, but unexpectedly to Idaho 28–13 in the Battle of the Palouse, the Vandals' first win the over the Cougars in a decade.

His 1965 team was nicknamed "The Cardiac Kids" for their dramatic late-game comebacks against Iowa, Minnesota, Villanova, Indiana, and Oregon State. It was also the only team in school history to defeat three Big Ten teams (Iowa, Minnesota, Indiana). The Cougars finished at 7–3, and beat Oregon and Oregon State, but lost to both Idaho and Washington for a second consecutive year. It was the first time the Cougars had lost two straight to the Vandals in forty years, done before a record-breaking crowd of 22,600 at Rogers Field.

Following the 1965 season, Clark signed a new three-year contract, at $19,700 per year. Expectations were high for 1966, but the Cougars were 3–7 and nearly lost to Idaho for a third straight year in a sloppy mudbath at Neale Stadium in Moscow. Two fourth-quarter WSU touchdowns, one on a fumble return and another on a long run from scrimmage after a Vandal fumble saved the day for the Cougars, 14–7. The Cougars were 1–3 in conference, with a win over Oregon and losses to California, Oregon State, and Washington.

The Cougars were winless through eight games in 1967, then thrashed Idaho 52–14 and squeaked by Washington 9–7 in Seattle to finish at 2–8 and 1–5 in conference. Clark was fired in late November, with a season remaining on his contract.

== After Pullman ==
Clark coached at the University of New Mexico in 1968 as defensive coordinator to first-time head coach Rudy Feldman, and went to the CFL in 1970 with the Winnipeg Blue Bombers under new head coach Jim Spavital. He later went into the investment business in Texas in Dallas and Galveston.

Clark died in Katy, Texas in December 2004 at the age of 74 and was buried at Sacred Heart Cemetery in Wichita Falls.

== Head coaching record ==
Year	Team	Overall	Conference	Standing	Bowl/playoffs
Washington State Cougars (Athletic Association of Western Universities) (1964–1967)
1964	Washington State	3–6–1	1–2–1	T–6th	
1965	Washington State	7–3	2–1	3rd	
1966	Washington State	3–7	1–3	T–6th	
1967	Washington State	2–8	1–5	T–7th	
Washington State:		15–24–1	5–11–1		
Total:		15–24–1			
