= 1966 Utah Utes football team =

American college football season

1966 Utah Utes football
- Conference: Western Athletic Conference
- Record: 5–5 (3–2 WAC)
- Head coach: Mike Giddings (1st season)
- Home stadium: Ute Stadium

1966 Western Athletic Conference football standings
	Conf.					Overall
Team	W		L		T	W		L		T
Wyoming $	5	–	0	–	0	10	–	1	–	0
BYU	3	–	2	–	0	8	–	2	–	0
Arizona State	3	–	2	–	0	5	–	5	–	0
Utah	3	–	2	–	0	5	–	5	–	0
Arizona	1	–	4	–	0	3	–	7	–	0
New Mexico	0	–	5	–	0	2	–	8	–	0
$ – Conference champion

The 1966 Utah Utes football team, or also commonly known as the Utah Redskins, was an American football team that represented the University of Utah as a member of the Western Athletic Conference (WAC) during the 1966 NCAA University Division football season. In their first season under head coach Mike Giddings, the Utes compiled an overall record of 5–5 with a mark of 3–2 against conference opponents, placing in a three-way tie for second in the WAC. Home games were played on campus at Ute Stadium in Salt Lake City.

== Schedule ==
Date	Opponent	Site	Result	Attendance	Source
September 24	at Oregon*	Hayward Field; Eugene, OR	W 17–14	16,500	
October 8	at Wyoming	War Memorial Stadium; Laramie, WY	L 7–40	13,283	
October 15	Washington State*	Ute Stadium; Salt Lake City, UT	W 26–15	20,051	
October 22	at Arizona	Arizona Stadium; Tucson, AZ	W 24–19	28,600	
October 29	New Mexico^{†}	Ute Stadium; Salt Lake City, UT	W 27–0	21,088	
November 5	at Arizona State	Sun Devil Stadium; Tempe, AZ	W 21–6	42,500	
November 12	BYU	Ute Stadium; Salt Lake City, UT (rivalry)	L 13–35	28,776	
November 19	Utah State*	Ute Stadium; Salt Lake City, UT (rivalry)	L 7–13	20,176	
November 26	at Texas Western*	Sun Bowl; El Paso, TX	L 20–27	16,527	
December 3	at Houston*	Jeppesen Stadium; Houston, TX	L 14–34	35,257	
*Non-conference game; ^{†}Homecoming

== Game summaries ==
=== BYU ===
BYU Cougars (6–1) at Utah Redskins (5–1)

Quarter	1	2	3	4	Total
BYU	7	21	7	0	35
Utah	7	0	6	0	13

at Ute Stadium, Salt Lake City, Utah

- Date: November 12, 1966
- Game weather: Clear
- Game attendance: 28,776
- Box Score

Game information

First quarter

- BYU – Kent Oborn 22-yard pass from Virgil Carter (Ben Laverty kick). BYU 7–0.
- UTAH – Merlin Diggs 15-yard pass from Darrell Bigelow (Jerry Pullman kick). Tie 7–7.

Second quarter

- BYU – Kent Oborn 11-yard pass from Virgil Carter (Ben Laverty kick). BYU 14–7.
- BYU – Kent Oborn 74-yard punt return (Ben Laverty kick). BYU 21–7.
- BYU – Casey Boyette 62-yard pass from Virgil Carter (Ben Laverty kick). BYU 28–7.

Third quarter

- UTAH – Ben Woodson 40-yard run (pass failed). BYU 28–13.
- BYU – Virgil Carter 3-yard run (Ben Laverty kick). BYU 35–13.

Fourth quarter

- No scoring

Top passers

- BYU – Virgil Carter – 18/31, 255 yards, 3 TD, INT
- UTAH – Darrell Bigelow – 7/25, 65 yards, TD, INT

Top rushers

- BYU – John Ogden – 23 rushes, 101 yards
- UTAH – Ben Woodson – 19 rushes, 106 yards, TD

Top receivers

- BYU – Casey Boyette – 7 receptions, 131 yards, TD
- UTAH – Terry Baker – 2 receptions, 26 yards

== Personnel ==
1966 Utah Utes football team roster
Players
Coaches
Offense

Pos.	#	Name	Class
QB		Darrell Bigelow
QB		Jack Gehrke
HB		Ben Woodson

Defense

Pos.	#	Name	Class
DE		Norm McBride

Special teams

Pos.	#	Name	Class

Head coach

- Mike Giddings

Coordinators/assistant coaches

Legend

- (C) Team captain
- (S) Suspended
- (I) Ineligible
- Injured
- Redshirt

=== NFL/AFL draft ===
Two Utah players were selected in the 1967 NFL/AFL draft.

Player	Position	Round	Pick	NFL/AFL team
Richard Tate	Defensive back	5	130	Green Bay Packers
Ben Woodson	Running back	15	384	Oakland Raiders
