= List of Wyoming Cowboys in the NFL draft =

The Wyoming Cowboys have had 85 players drafted to the NFL since the first draft in 1936. Of those 84 players, 5 have been selected to a Pro Bowl, and 7 have been a part of a Super Bowl or NFL Championship winning team. Currently, 5 of those draftees still play in the NFL.

The highest drafted Cowboy is Josh Allen, taken 7th overall in 2018 Draft. The most Cowboys ever taken in a draft is 5, in 1968.

== Key ==
B	Back	K	Kicker	NT	Nose tackle
C	Center	LB	Linebacker	FB	Fullback
DB	Defensive back	P	Punter	HB	Halfback
DE	Defensive end	QB	Quarterback	WR	Wide receiver
DT	Defensive tackle	RB	Running back	G	Guard
E	End	T	Offensive tackle	TE	Tight end

*	Selected to a Pro Bowl
†	Won a Super Bowl championship/NFL Championship Game
‡	Selected to a Pro Bowl and won a Super Bowl/NFL Championship Game

== Selections ==
Year	Round	Pick	Overall	Player	Team	Position	Notes
1947	21	6	191	Jim Clayton	Philadelphia Eagles	T	—
1947	23	2	207	Hank Kolaskinski	Boston Yanks	B	—
1950	28	7	359	Sonny Jones	Chicago Cardinals	B	—
1951	13	2	149	Dick Campbell	Washington Redskins	B	—
1951	27	10	325	Jerry Taylor	Chicago Bears	C	—
1952	3	12	37	Dewey McConnell	Los Angeles Rams	E	—
1952	19	12	229	Harry Geldien	Los Angeles Rams	B	—
1953	12	2	135	Chuck Spaulding	Chicago Cardinals	B	—
1955	25	3	292	Frank Radella	Washington Redskins	C	—
1956	17	5	198	Joe Mastrogiovanni	Philadelphia Eagles	B	—
1956	23	11	276	Geoerge Galuska	Detroit Lions	B	—
1957	14	6	163	Jim Crawford	Pittsburgh Steelers	B	—
1959	11	11	131	Bob Sawyer	New York Giants	B	—
1959	21	2	242	Dale Memmelaar^{†}	Chicago Cardinals	G	NFL Champion (1964)
1960	16	8	188	Jim Walden	Cleveland Browns	QB	—
1961	3	7	35	Jerry Hill^{†}	Baltimore Colts	RB	Super Bowl Champion (V)
1961	4	1	43	Chuck Lamson	Minnesota Vikings	RB	—
1961	19	8	260	Dick Schnell	St. Louis Cardinals	T	—
1964	16	2	212	Will Radosevich	Philadelphia Eagles	T	—
1966	10	3	143	Jerry Marion	Pittsburgh Steelers	DB	—
1966	15	9	224	Darryl Alleman	St. Louis Cardinals	WR	—
1967	1	14	14	Ron Billingsley	San Diego Chargers	DT	—
1967	6	22	155	Rick Egloff	Oakland Raiders	QB	—
1967	8	18	203	Don Klacking	Philadelphia Eagles	RB	—
1967	17	9	428	Mike Davenport	Pittsburgh Steelers	RB	—
1968	2	10	37	Jerry DePoyster	Detroit Lions	K	—
1968	2	24	51	Mike La Hood	Los Angeles Rams	G	—
1968	5	7	118	Jim Kiick^{‡}	Miami Dolphins	RB	2× Super Bowl Champion (VII, VIII); 2× Pro Bowl (1968, 1969)
1968	5	11	122	Mike Dirks	Philadelphia Eagles	T	—
1968	7	22	187	Paul Toscano	Houston Oilers	DB	—
1969	5	19	123	Gene Huey	St. Louis Cardinals	WR	—
1969	9	12	220	Dave Hampton	Green Bay Packers	RB	—
1969	10	6	240	Dennis Devlin	Boston Patriots	DB	—
1970	4	9	87	Vic Washington*	San Francisco 49ers	WR	Pro Bowl (1971)
1970	12	12	298	Larry Nels	New York Giants	LB	—
1970	12	23	309	Joe Williams^{†}	Dallas Cowboys	RB	Super Bowl champion (VI)
1971	7	14	170	Bob Jacobs	Cleveland Browns	K	—
1972	5	6	110	Conrad Dobler*	St. Louis Cardinals	G	3× Pro Bowl (1975–1977)
1973	6	12	142	Nick Bebout	Atlanta Falcons	T	—
1973	11	19	279	Scott Freeman	Detroit Lions	WR	—
1973	16	23	413	Jerry Gadlin	Oakland Raiders	WR	—
1975	10	21	255	Mike McGraw	St. Louis Cardinals	LB	—
1975	10	26	260	Archie Gray	Pittsburgh Steelers	WR	—
1976	1	16	16	Lawrence Gaines	Detroit Lions	RB	—
1976	1	27	27	Aaron Kyle^{†}	Dallas Cowboys	DB	Super Bowl champion (XII)
1978	6	19	157	Francis Chesley	New Orleans Saints	LB	—
1979	2	9	37	Ken Fantetti	Detroit Lions	LB	—
1980	4	7	90	Danny Pittman	New York Giants	WR	—
1981	4	10	93	Guy Frazier	Cincinnati Bengals	LB	—
1981	12	17	321	Mandel Robinson	Denver Broncos	RB	—
1982	3	26	81	Jim Eliopulos	Dallas Cowboys	LB	—
1982	11	24	303	Gary Crum	Miami Dolphins	T	—
1983	10	13	264	James Williams	New England Patriots	TE	—
1983	11	16	295	John Salley	Atlanta Falcons	DB	—
1984	2	24	52	Chris Kolodziejski	Pittsburgh Steelers	TE	—
1985	6	18	158	Jay Novacek^{‡}	St. Louis Cardinals	TE	3× Super Bowl champion (XXVII, XXVIII, XXX); 5× Pro Bowl (1991–1995)
1986	8	11	205	Allyn Griffin	Detroit Lions	WR	—
1988	6	28	165	Jeff Knapton	Los Angeles Rams	DT	—
1989	2	15	43	Eric Coleman	New England Patriots	DB	—
1989	5	16	128	David Edeen	Phoenix Cardinals	DE	—
1989	9	26	249	Pat Rabold	Buffalo Bills	DT	—
1990	8	21	214	Craig Schlichting	Minnesota Vikings	DE	—
1991	4	12	95	Mitch Donahue	San Francisco 49ers	LB	—
1991	9	16	239	Shawn Wiggins	Cleveland Browns	WR	—
1992	11	18	298	Doug Rigby	Kansas City Chiefs	DE	—
1994	2	12	41	Ryan Yarborough	New York Jets	WR	—
1995	5	35	169	Ryan Christopherson	Jacksonville Jaguars	RB	—
1995	7	37	245	John Burrough	Atlanta Falcons	DE	—
1996	7	27	236	Brian Gragert	Denver Broncos	P	—
1997	3	23	83	Steve Scifres	Dallas Cowboys	G	—
1997	6	24	187	Lee Vaughn	Dallas Cowboys	DB	—
1997	7	31	232	Marcus Harris	Detroit Lions	WR	—
2001	5	26	157	Patrick Chukwurah	Minnesota Vikings	LB	—
2004	7	17	218	Casey Bramlet	Cincinnati Bengals	QB	—
2006	6	39	208	Derrick Martin^{†}	Baltimore Ravens	DB	2× Super Bowl champion (XLV, XLVI)
2007	6	10	184	John Wendling	Buffalo Bills	DB	—
2011	4	24	121	Chris Prosinski	Jacksonville Jaguars	DB	—
2014	4	22	122	Marqueston Huff	Tennessee Titans	DB	—
2014	6	9	185	Robert Herron	Tampa Bay Buccaneers	WR	—
2015	7	19	236	Mark Nzeocha	Dallas Cowboys	LB	—
2017	5	12	156	Brian Hill	Atlanta Falcons	RB	—
2017	6	15	199	Chase Roullier	Washington Redskins	C	—
2018	1	7	7	Josh Allen*	Buffalo Bills	QB	NFL MVP (2024); 4× Pro Bowl (2020, 2022, 2024, 2025)
2019	6	18	191	Marcus Epps	Minnesota Vikings	DB	—
2020	3	1	65	Logan Wilson	Cincinnati Bengals	LB	—
2020	6	24	204	Cassh Maluia	New England Patriots	LB	—
2022	3	6	70	Chad Muma	Jacksonville Jaguars	LB	—

== Notable undrafted players ==
Note: No drafts held before 1920

Year	Player	Debut Team	Position	Notes
1972	Nelson Munsey	CB	Baltimore Colts	—
1979	John Arnold	WR	Detroit Lions	—
1980	Mike Dennis	CB	New York Giants	—
1980	Pat Ogrin	DT	Washington Redskins	—
1985	Rick Donnelly	P	New England Patriots	—
1988	Craig Burnett	QB	Dallas Cowboys	—
1996	Joe Cummings	LB	Philadelphia Eagles	—
1998	Rob Bohlinger	T	Carolina Panthers	—
2000	Trent Gamble	S	Miami Dolphins	—
2001	Aaron Elling	K	Miami Dolphins	—
2003	Scottie Vines	WR	Green Bay Packers	—
2003	Adam Goldberg	T	Minnesota Vikings	—
2004	Malcom Floyd	WR	San Diego Chargers	—
2010	Mitch Unrein	DT	Houston Texans	—
2012	Tashaun Gipson	S	Cleveland Browns	—
2013	Kurt Taufa'asau	DT	Oakland Raiders	—
2013	Mike Purcell	DT	San Francisco 49ers	—
2017	Jacob Hollister	TE	New England Patriots	—
2019	Carl Granderson	DE	New Orleans Saints	—
2019	Andrew Wingard	S	Jacksonville Jaguars	—
2020	Tyler Hall	CB	Atlanta Falcons	—
2024	Frank Crum	OL	Denver Broncos	—
2024	Easton Gibbs	LB	Seattle Seahawks	—
2024	Andrew Peasley	QB	New York Jets	—
2024	Treyton Welch	TE	Cleveland Browns	—
2025	Wyett Ekeler	S	Indianapolis Colts	—
2025	John Hoyland	PK	Baltimore Ravens	—
2026	Caden Barnett	OL	Chicago Bears	—
2026	John Michael Gyllenborg	TE	Kansas City Chiefs	—
2026	Sam Scott	RB	New York Jets	—
2026	Evan Svoboda	TE	Los Angeles Chargers	—
