= 1966 Wyoming Cowboys football team =

American college football season

1966 Wyoming Cowboys football

WAC champion Sun Bowl champion

Sun Bowl, W 28–20 vs. Florida State
- Conference: Western Athletic Conference

Ranking
- Coaches: No. 15
- Record: 10–1 (5–0 WAC)
- Head coach: Lloyd Eaton (5th season)
- Captains: Rick Egloff; Tom Frazier
- Home stadium: War Memorial Stadium

1966 Western Athletic Conference football standings
	Conf.					Overall
Team	W		L		T	W		L		T
Wyoming $	5	–	0	–	0	10	–	1	–	0
BYU	3	–	2	–	0	8	–	2	–	0
Arizona State	3	–	2	–	0	5	–	5	–	0
Utah	3	–	2	–	0	5	–	5	–	0
Arizona	1	–	4	–	0	3	–	7	–	0
New Mexico	0	–	5	–	0	2	–	8	–	0
$ – Conference champion

The 1966 Wyoming Cowboys football team was an American football team that represented the University of Wyoming as a member of the Western Athletic Conference (WAC) during the 1966 NCAA University Division football season. In their fifth year under head coach Lloyd Eaton, the Cowboys compiled a 10–1 record (5-0 against conference opponents), won the first of three consecutive WAC titles, outscored opponents by a total of 355 to 89, and had the nation's best rushing defense.

Led by quarterback Rick Egloff, running back Jim Kiick, and middle guard Jerry Durling, Wyoming defeated Florida State 24–16 in the Sun Bowl at El Paso, Texas. Durling was a first round selection in 1966 by the Philadelphia Eagles, and Defensive tackle Ron Billingsley was a first round pick in the 1967 NFL/AFL draft, the fourteenth overall selection.

Wyoming finished the season ranked 15th in the UPI Coaches Poll.

The team played its home games on campus at War Memorial Stadium in Laramie.

The 1966 team featured ten all-conference players (Jerry Marion, Mike LaHood, Dave Rupp, Jerry DePoyster, Tom Frazier, Dick Speights, Vic Washington, Kiick, Durling, and Billingsley), and joined the Wyoming Athletics Hall of Fame, Class of 2010.

== Schedule ==
Date	Opponent	Rank	Site	TV	Result	Attendance	Source
September 17	at Air Force*		Falcon Stadium; Colorado Springs, CO		W 13–0	27,852	
September 24	Arizona State		War Memorial Stadium; Laramie, WY		W 23–6	19,251	
October 1	Arizona		War Memorial Stadium; Laramie, WY		W 36–6	13,283	
October 8	Utah		War Memorial Stadium; Laramie, WY		W 40–7	17,588	
October 15	New Mexico		War Memorial Stadium; Laramie, WY		W 37–7	12,467	
October 22	Utah State*		War Memorial Stadium; Laramie, WY (rivalry)		W 35–10	18,253	
October 29	at Colorado State*	No. 10	Colorado Field; Fort Collins, CO (rivalry)		L 10–12	15,000	
November 5	at Wichita State*		Veterans Field; Wichita, KS		W 55–0	9,173	
November 12	at Texas Western*		Sun Bowl; El Paso, TX		W 31–7	29,174	
November 19	at BYU		Cougar Stadium; Provo, UT		W 47–14	37,651	
December 24	vs. Florida State*		Sun Bowl; El Paso, TX (Sun Bowl)	NBC	W 28–20	24,381	
*Non-conference game; Rankings from AP Poll released prior to the game

== NFL/AFL Draft ==
Four Cowboys were selected in the 1967 NFL/AFL draft, the first common draft, which lasted seventeen rounds (445 selections).

Player	Position	Round	Overall	Franchise
Ron Billingsley	Defensive tackle	1	14	San Diego Chargers
Rick Egloff	Quarterback	6	155	Oakland Raiders
Don Klacking	Running back	8	203	Philadelphia Eagles
Mike Davenport	Running back	17	428	Pittsburgh Steelers

- List of Wyoming Cowboys in the NFL draft
