= 1966 Sun Bowl =

American college football game

Florida State Seminoles	Wyoming Cowboys
(6–4)	(9–1)
Independent	WAC
20	28
Head coach: Bill Peterson	Head coach: Lloyd Eaton
	AP / Coaches; NR / 15
	1	2	3	4	Total
Florida State	0	14	0	6	20
Wyoming	7	0	14	7	28
- Date: December 24, 1966
- Season: 1966
- Stadium: Sun Bowl
- Location: El Paso, Texas
- MVP: Jim Kiick, HB, Wyoming
- Referee: Joe Miller (WAC; split crew: WAC, SEC)
- Attendance: 24,381

United States TV coverage
- Network: NBC

The 1966 Sun Bowl was a college football postseason bowl game between the Wyoming Cowboys and the Florida State Seminoles, played on December 24 at El Paso, Texas.

== Background ==
The Cowboys were champions of the Western Athletic Conference (WAC) for the first time and were in the Sun Bowl for the third time in ten years. Florida State was an independent and in the Sun Bowl for the first time in a dozen years.

== Game summary ==
Wyoming junior halfback Jim Kiick rushed for 135 yards on 25 carries, caught four passes for 42 yards, and scored twice (first and third quarters). Florida State quarterback Kim Hammond threw two touchdowns, one to Ron Sellers for 49 yards and four minutes later a 59-yard pass to T. K. Wetherell to give the Seminoles a 14–7 lead at halftime.

Cowboy Jerry Marion caught a 39-yard pass from quarterback Rick Egloff to tie the score at fourteen each. Kiick's touchdown of 43 yards reclaimed the lead for Wyoming at 21–14. In the fourth quarter, Egloff added a rushing touchdown to make it 28–14. Hammond and Ron Sellers connected for another touchdown reception to narrow the margin to eight, but the Seminoles failed to score again.

Kiick won the Dr. C. M Hendricks award as the Sun Bowl's most valuable player, and middle guard Jerry Durling won the Hizson Jewelry Trophy as the lineman of the game. Durling was also named to the 22-player UPI All-Bowl Team.

Released prior to the November bowl games, Wyoming finished the season ranked 15th in the UPI Coaches Poll.

== Aftermath ==
The Cowboys have yet to return to the Sun Bowl. While Eaton won three consecutive conference titles (1966, 1967, and 1968), he was fired four years later. The Cowboys struggled in his last sixteen games: they went 3–13 in the final six games of the 1969 and through the 1970 season, after getting rid of 14 players for wanting to wear armbands in protest. The Seminoles have also not returned to the Sun Bowl since this game, but have had better success in the time since.
