= 1966 Washington State Cougars football team =

American college football season

1966 Washington State Cougars football
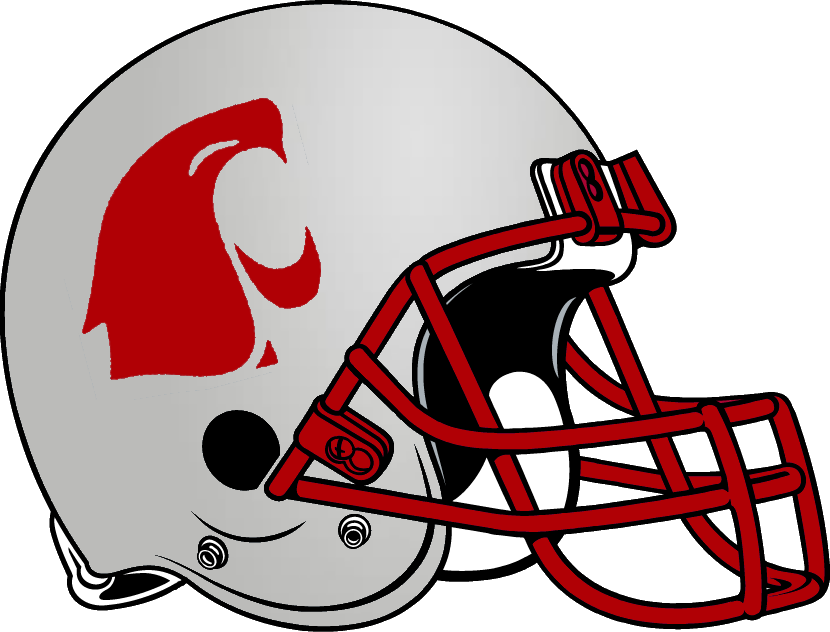
- Conference: Athletic Association of Western Universities
- Record: 3–7 (1–3 AAWU)
- Head coach: Bert Clark (3rd season)
- Home stadium: Rogers Field; Joe Albi Stadium (Spokane)

1966 Athletic Association of Western Universities football standings
	Conf.					Overall
Team	W		L		T	W		L		T
USC $	4	–	1	–	0	7	–	4	–	0
No. 5 UCLA	3	–	1	–	0	9	–	1	–	0
Oregon State	3	–	1	–	0	7	–	3	–	0
Washington	4	–	3	–	0	6	–	4	–	0
California	2	–	3	–	0	3	–	7	–	0
Oregon	1	–	3	–	0	3	–	7	–	0
Washington State	1	–	3	–	0	3	–	7	–	0
Stanford	1	–	4	–	0	5	–	5	–	0
$ – Conference champion; Rankings from AP Poll

The 1966 Washington State Cougars football team was an American football team that represented Washington State University in the Athletic Association of Western Universities (AAWU) during the 1966 NCAA University Division football season. Led by third-year head coach Bert Clark, the Cougars compiled a 3–7 record (1–3 in AAWU, tie for sixth), and were outscored 211 to 132. Two home games were played on campus at Rogers Field in Pullman, and three at Joe Albi Stadium in Spokane.

The team's statistical leaders included Jerry Henderson with 989 passing yards, Ammon McWashington with 298 rushing yards, and Doug Flansburg with 613 receiving yards.

The trip to the Houston Astrodome in September included a jet flight, the first for Cougar football. It was the first college football game played on artificial turf, the majority (baseball outfield) of the AstroTurf was installed two months earlier in July.

After consecutive losses in the Battle of the Palouse, WSU scored two late touchdowns to defeat Idaho 14–7 in the chilly mud at Neale Stadium on October 22; the Cougars have not played in neighboring Moscow since.

Washington State defeated Oregon in the final varsity football game at Hayward Field. In the rivlary game with Washington at Spokane, the Cougars lost for the eighth straight year.

== Schedule ==
Date	Opponent	Site	Result	Attendance	Source
September 17	California	Joe Albi Stadium; Spokane, WA	L 6–21	23,300	
September 23	at Houston*	Houston Astrodome; Houston, TX	L 7–21	36,104	
October 1	Baylor*	Joe Albi Stadium; Spokane, WA	L 14–20	18,500–19,775	
October 8	Arizona State*	Rogers Field; Pullman, WA	W 24–15	18,700	
October 15	at Utah*	Ute Stadium; Salt Lake City, UT	L 15–26	20,051	
October 22	at Idaho*	Neale Stadium; Moscow, ID (Battle of the Palouse)	W 14–7	16,500	
October 29	Oregon State^{†}	Rogers Field; Pullman, WA	L 13–41	18,500	
November 5	at Oregon	Hayward Field; Eugene, OR	W 14–13	17,500	
November 12	at Arizona*	Arizona Stadium; Tucson, AZ	L 18–28	23,000	
November 19	Washington	Joe Albi Stadium; Spokane, WA (Apple Cup)	L 7-19	33,800	
*Non-conference game; ^{†}Homecoming

== Roster ==
1966 Washington State Cougars football team roster
Players
Coaches
Offense

Pos.	#	Name	Class
FB	32	Del Carmichael	Jr
OT	78	Greg Elliot	Jr
SE	80	Doug Flansburg	Jr
FB	31	Ted Gerela	Jr
QB	12	Hank Grenda	So
QB	11	Jerry Henderson	So
G	67	Robin Larson	Sr
HB	45	Ammon McWashington	Sr
G	68	Dave Middendorf	Jr
QB	15	Dave Petersen	Sr
HB	40	Glen Shaw	So
TE	88	Rich Sheron	Sr
TE	42	Bob Simpson	Jr
OT	55	Dave Thomas	Sr
C	52	Ron Vrlicak	Sr

Defense

Pos.	#	Name	Class
MG	60	Jerry Anderson	Jr
LB	32	Dick Baird	Jr
DT	72	Burgess Bauder	Sr
LB	66	Steve Boots	Jr
S, QB	10	Mike Cadigan	Jr
DE	85	Craig Goodwin	Jr
LB	61	Larry Griffith	Sr
DB	44	Bud Norris	Sr
S	15	Dave Petersen	Sr
CB	14	Rick Reed	So
DE	83	John Thompson	Jr
MG	78	Bob Trygstad	Sr
DT	77	Steve Van Sinderen	So
LB	34	Mark Wicks	Jr

Special teams

Pos.	#	Name	Class
PK	31	Ted Gerela	Jr
P	84	Jim Engstrom	Jr

Head coach

- Bert Clark (3rd year)

Coordinators/assistant coaches

- Laurie Niemi
- King Block
- Red Smith
- Jim Shanley
- John Nelson
- Sam Adams

Legend

- (C) Team captain
- (S) Suspended
- (I) Ineligible
- Injured
- Redshirt

== NFL/AFL draft ==
Three Cougars were selected in the 1967 NFL/AFL draft.

Player	Position	Round	Overall	Franchise
Rich Sheron	TE	2	37	New York Jets
Bud Norris	TE	6	138	Miami Dolphins
Bob Trygstad	DT	11	271	Minnesota Vikings
