= 1966 New Mexico Lobos football team =

American college football season

1966 New Mexico Lobos football
- Conference: Western Athletic Conference
- Record: 2–8 (0–5 WAC)
- Head coach: Bill Weeks (7th season)
- Home stadium: University Stadium

1966 Western Athletic Conference football standings
	Conf.					Overall
Team	W		L		T	W		L		T
Wyoming $	5	–	0	–	0	10	–	1	–	0
BYU	3	–	2	–	0	8	–	2	–	0
Arizona State	3	–	2	–	0	5	–	5	–	0
Utah	3	–	2	–	0	5	–	5	–	0
Arizona	1	–	4	–	0	3	–	7	–	0
New Mexico	0	–	5	–	0	2	–	8	–	0
$ – Conference champion

The 1966 New Mexico Lobos football team was an American football team that represented the University of New Mexico in the Western Athletic Conference (WAC) during the 1966 NCAA University Division football season. In their seventh season under head coach Bill Weeks, the Lobos compiled a 2–8 record (0–5 against WAC opponents) and were outscored, 320 to 101.

Wally Seis and Albert O'Neal were the team captains. The team's statistical leaders included Rick Beitler with 763 passing yards, Carl Jackson with 348 rushing yards, Emilio Vallez with 373 receiving yards, and Carl Bradford with 24 points scored.

== Schedule ==
Date	Opponent	Site	Result	Attendance	Source
September 17	Utah State*	University Stadium; Albuquerque, NM	W 17–8	20,570	
September 24	at Kansas State*	Memorial Stadium; Manhattan, KS	W 28–8	15,300	
October 1	at Texas Western*	Sun Bowl; El Paso, TX	L 3–51	34,459	
October 8	Arizona	University Stadium; Albuquerque, NM (rivalry)	L 15–36	22,075	
October 15	at Wyoming	War Memorial Stadium; Laramie, WY	L 7–37	12,467	
October 22	BYU	University Stadium; Albuquerque, NM	L 6–33	18,524	
October 29	at Utah	Ute Stadium; Salt Lake City, UT	L 0–27	21,088	
November 5	Colorado State*^{†}	University Stadium; Albuquerque, NM	L 6–45	16,855	
November 12	New Mexico State*	University Stadium; Albuquerque, NM (rivalry)	L 6–20	12,272	
November 19	at Arizona State	Sun Devil Stadium; Tempe, AZ	L 7–28	25,111	
*Non-conference game; ^{†}Homecoming
