= 1966 Arizona State Sun Devils football team =

American college football season

1966 Arizona State Sun Devils football
- Conference: Western Athletic Conference
- Record: 5–5 (3–2 WAC)
- Head coach: Frank Kush (9th season)
- Home stadium: Sun Devil Stadium

1966 Western Athletic Conference football standings
	Conf.					Overall
Team	W		L		T	W		L		T
Wyoming $	5	–	0	–	0	10	–	1	–	0
BYU	3	–	2	–	0	8	–	2	–	0
Arizona State	3	–	2	–	0	5	–	5	–	0
Utah	3	–	2	–	0	5	–	5	–	0
Arizona	1	–	4	–	0	3	–	7	–	0
New Mexico	0	–	5	–	0	2	–	8	–	0
$ – Conference champion

The 1966 Arizona State Sun Devils football team was an American football team that represented Arizona State University in the Western Athletic Conference (WAC) during the 1966 NCAA University Division football season. In their ninth season under head coach Frank Kush, the Sun Devils compiled a 5–5 record (3–2 in WAC, second), and were outscored 174 to 166.

The team's statistical leaders included John Goodman with 1,259 passing yards, Travis Williams with 551 rushing yards, and Ken Dyer with 496 receiving yards.

Don Baker, Bill Kajikawa, Paul Kemp, Larry Kentera, Jack Stovall, and Dick Tamburo were assistant coaches. The team captains were offensive tackle Ray Shirey and defensive end Steve Timarac. The Sun Devils finished 3–3 at home and 2–2 on the road. All home games were played at Sun Devil Stadium in Tempe, Arizona.

== Schedule ==
Date	Opponent	Site	Result	Attendance	Source
September 17	Texas Western*	Sun Devil Stadium; Tempe, AZ	W 30–26	39,367	
September 24	at Wyoming	War Memorial Stadium; Laramie, WY	L 6–23	19,251	
October 1	West Texas State*	Sun Devil Stadium; Tempe, AZ	L 20–21	29,882	
October 8	at Washington State*	Rogers Field; Pullman, WA	L 13–24	18,700	
October 14	at BYU	Cougar Stadium; Provo, UT	W 10–7	20,119	
October 22	Oregon State*	Sun Devil Stadium; Tempe, AZ	L 17–18	29,118	
November 5	Utah	Sun Devil Stadium; Tempe, AZ	L 6–21	42,500	
November 12	Oregon*	Sun Devil Stadium; Tempe, AZ	W 14–10	30,642	
November 19	New Mexico	Sun Devil Stadium; Tempe, AZ	W 28–7	25,111	
November 26	at Arizona	Arizona Stadium; Tucson, AZ (rivalry)	W 20–17	33,500	
*Non-conference game

== Game summaries ==
On September 17, Arizona State opened its season with a 30–26 victory over Texas Western. The game drew a record opening night crowd of 39,367. The Sun Devils trailed, 19–7, at halftime, but quarterback John Goodman led a comeback in the fourth quarter.

On September 24, the team suffered a 23–6 road loss against Wyoming. Quarterback John Goodman threw three interceptions in the first quarter, and each one led to a Wyoming score. The Sun Devils trailed, 17–0, at the end of the disastrous first quarter.

On October 1, the team lost, 21–20, to West Texas State at Sun Devil Stadium. Wes Plummer set an Arizona State record when he returned a punt 85 yards for a touchdown.

On October 8, the Sun Devils lost a 24–15 road contest against Washington State.

On October 14, Arizona State halted its three-game losing streak with a 10–7 road victory over undefeated BYU.

On October 22, the Sun Devils suffered an 18–17 home loss to Oregon State.

On November 5, following a bye week, the Sun Devils lost, 21–6, at home against Utah. To that point in the season, they had lost five of seven games.

On November 12, the Sun Devils bounced back with a 14–10 home win over Oregon. This was the first college football game between Arizona State and Oregon.

On November 19, Arizona State defeated New Mexico, 28–7, at Sun Devil Stadium.

On November 26, in the annual Arizona–Arizona State football rivalry game, the Sun Devils prevailed for a 20–17 road victory against Arizona.

== Roster ==
Arizona State's usual offensive lineup included: wide receiver Ken Dyer, left tackle Ray Shirey, left guard Jim Kane, center George Hummer, right guard Obie Lowe, right tackle Larry Langford, quarterback John Goodman, halfback Max Anderson, fullback Travis Williams, and wingback Fair Hooker.

Arizona State's usual defensive lineup included: left defensive end Jesse Fleming, left defensive tackle Bob Rokita, middle guard Curley Culp, right defensive tackle Larry Hendershot, right defensive end Steve Timarac, left linebacker Dick Egloff, middle linebacker Dave Buchanan, right linebacker Ron Pritchard, left cornerback John Pitts, right cornerback Ken Dyer, and safety Phil Booker.

Arizona State's specialists included punter Ken Hornbeck and placekicker Bob Rokita.

Cecil Abono, Ron Elam, Chuck Hunt, Paul Palumbo, Rick Shaw, Nello Tomarelli, Dickie Brown, Mike Chowaniec, Richard Mann, and Wes Plummer were also on the roster.

== Individual and team statistics ==
The team's statistical leaders included:

- Travis Williams with 551 rushing yards on 37 carries and an average of 4.0 yards per carry;
- John Goodman with 1,259 passing yards on 96 of 168 passing (53.6% completion) with eight touchdown passes and 14 interceptions;
- Max Anderson (five touchdowns) and Rob Rokita (18 extra points and four field goals) with 30 points scored each;
- Ken Dyer with 29 receptions for 496 yards and two touchdowns;
- Chuck Hunt, Ken Dyer, and John Pitts with four interceptions each;
- Ken Hornbeck with 64 punts for 2,474 yards, an average of 38.7 yards per punt;
- Max Anderson with eight kickoff returns for 108 yards and Ron Elam with seven returns for 145 yards; and
- Chuck Hunt with seven punt returns for 34 yards.

The team's statistical averages for the 1966 season included the following:

- 113.1 rushing yards gained per game on offense, 103.8 rushing yards allowed per game on defense;
- 150.1 passing yards gained per game on offense, 140.8 passing yards allowed per game on defense;
- 263.2 yards of total offense gained per game, 244.6 yards of total offense allowed per game on defense;
- 16.6 points scored per game, 17.4 points allowed per game;
- 146 first downs on offense, 136 first downs allowed on defense; and
- 64 total punts for an average of 38.7 yards.

== Awards and honors ==
Linebacker Ron Pritchard received All-American Honorable Mention honors from the Associated Press for the 1966 football season.

Pritchard, Curley Culp, and Steve Timarac received first-team All-Western Athletic Conference honors for the 1966 campaign. Ken Dyer and Ray Shirey received second-team All-Western Athletic Conference honors.

Ken Dyer earned the National Football Foundation Hall of Fame Scholar Athlete Award for the 1966 campaign and was also named an Academic All-American.

Team awards were presented as follows:

- Ray Shirey won the Sun Angel Award for leadership, team spirit, and athletic ability.
- Steve Timarac won the Mike Bartholomew Award as the outstanding senior lineman.
- Paul Palumbo won the Cecil Abono Captains Award.
- Chuck Hunt won the Glen Hawkins Sportsmanship Award.
- Chuck Hunt won the Most Improved Award.
