= 1966 Washington Huskies football team =

American college football season

1966 Washington Huskies football
- Conference: Athletic Association of Western Universities
- Record: 6–4 (4–3 AAWU)
- Head coach: Jim Owens (10th season)
- Captains: Tom Greenlee; Mike Ryan
- Home stadium: University of Washington Stadium

1966 Athletic Association of Western Universities football standings
	Conf.					Overall
Team	W		L		T	W		L		T
USC $	4	–	1	–	0	7	–	4	–	0
No. 5 UCLA	3	–	1	–	0	9	–	1	–	0
Oregon State	3	–	1	–	0	7	–	3	–	0
Washington	4	–	3	–	0	6	–	4	–	0
California	2	–	3	–	0	3	–	7	–	0
Oregon	1	–	3	–	0	3	–	7	–	0
Washington State	1	–	3	–	0	3	–	7	–	0
Stanford	1	–	4	–	0	5	–	5	–	0
$ – Conference champion; Rankings from AP Poll

The 1966 Washington Huskies football team was an American football team that represented the University of Washington during the 1966 NCAA University Division football season. In its tenth season under head coach Jim Owens, the team compiled a 6–4 record, finished in fourth place in the Athletic Association of Western Universities, and outscored its opponents 171 to 141. The team captains were seniors Tom Greenlee and Mike Ryan.

In the season-ending Apple Cup at Joe Albi Stadium in Spokane, the Huskies defeated rival Washington State for the eighth straight year.

== Schedule ==
Date	Opponent	Site	Result	Attendance	Source
September 17	Idaho*	University of Washington Stadium; Seattle, WA	W 19–7	55,360	
September 24	Air Force*	University of Washington Stadium; Seattle, WA	L 0–10	56,350	
October 1	at Ohio State*	Ohio Stadium; Columbus, OH	W 38–22	80,241	
October 8	at No. 6 USC	Los Angeles Memorial Coliseum; Los Angeles, CA	L 14–17	55,960	
October 15	California	University of Washington Stadium; Seattle, WA	L 20–24	54,650	
October 22	Oregon	University of Washington Stadium; Seattle, WA (rivalry)	W 10–7	50,596	
October 29	at Stanford	Stanford Stadium; Stanford, CA	W 22–20	38,500	
November 5	No. 3 UCLA	University of Washington Stadium; Seattle, WA	W 16–3	56,300	
November 12	at Oregon State	Parker Stadium; Corvallis, OR	L 13–24	21,347	
November 19	at Washington State	Joe Albi Stadium; Spokane, WA (Apple Cup)	W 19–7	33,800	
*Non-conference game; Rankings from AP Poll released prior to the game

== Roster ==
1966 Washington Huskies football team roster
Players
Coaches
Offense

Pos.	#	Name	Class
C	56	Bill Barnes	Sr
G	61	Gary Brandt	Sr
OT	73	Mac Bledsoe	Jr
C	51	Greg Cass	Sr
SE	91	Pete Claridge
HB	28	Jim Cope	So
FB	35	Jeff Jordan	Sr
SE	89	Jeff Huget	So
OT	67	Jim Kirk	Sr
QB	16	Mike McCoy	So
HB	40	Don Moore	Sr
HB	25	Bill Parker	Jr
TE	87	Omar Parker	Sr
OT	74	Bob Richardson	Jr
G	66	Mike Ryan (C)	Sr
SE	92	Steve Sanford	Sr
QB	14	Tom Sparlin	Jr
HB	24	Gerald Wea	Jr
RB	39	Carl Wojciechowski	So
SE	90	Dave Williams	Sr

Defense

Pos.	#	Name	Class
MG	72	Bob Anderson	So
LB	50	Cliff Coker	Jr
DB	21	Dave Dillon	Sr
DB	47	Dave DuPree	Jr
DT	99	Bill Glennon	Jr
DE	19	Tom Greenlee (C)	Sr
LB	37	Dean Halverson	Jr
LB	49	George Jugum	So
DB	20	Vince Lorrain	Sr
MG	58	Mike Maggart	So
DB	17	Bob Pederson	So
DE	83	Bob Schoepper	So
DB	11	Dan Spriesterbach	So
DB	27	Frank Smith	Jr
DT	79	Steve Thompson	Jr
DE	98	Otis Washington	So
MG	77	Jerry Williams	Sr
CB	92	Harrison Wood	So
DB	12	Al Worley	So

Special teams

Pos.	#	Name	Class
PK, P	5	Don Martin	Jr

Head coach

- Jim Owens (10th year)

Coordinators/assistant coaches

- Tom Tipps
- Mel Thompson
- Don White
- Jack Friedman
- Bob Schloredt
- Bob Monroe
- Dave Phillips

Legend

- (C) Team captain
- (S) Suspended
- (I) Ineligible
- Injured
- Redshirt

== NFL/AFL draft selections ==
Five University of Washington Huskies were selected in the 1967 NFL/AFL draft, the first common draft, which lasted 17 rounds with 445 selections.

= Husky Hall of Fame

Player	Position	Round	Pick	Franchise
Dave Williams	Wide receiver	1st	16	St. Louis Cardinals
Tom Greenlee	Defensive back	4th	95	Chicago Bears
Greg Cass	Center	9th	221	Chicago Bears
Omar Parker	Guard	11th	281	Philadelphia Eagles
Bill Barnes	Center	17th	434	Los Angeles Rams
