= 1966 UCLA Bruins football team =

American college football season

1966 UCLA Bruins football
- Conference: Athletic Association of Western Universities

Ranking
- Coaches: No. 5
- AP: No. 5
- Record: 9–1 (3–1 AAWU)
- Head coach: Tommy Prothro (2nd season)
- Home stadium: Los Angeles Memorial Coliseum

1966 Athletic Association of Western Universities football standings
	Conf.					Overall
Team	W		L		T	W		L		T
USC $	4	–	1	–	0	7	–	4	–	0
No. 5 UCLA	3	–	1	–	0	9	–	1	–	0
Oregon State	3	–	1	–	0	7	–	3	–	0
Washington	4	–	3	–	0	6	–	4	–	0
California	2	–	3	–	0	3	–	7	–	0
Oregon	1	–	3	–	0	3	–	7	–	0
Washington State	1	–	3	–	0	3	–	7	–	0
Stanford	1	–	4	–	0	5	–	5	–	0
$ – Conference champion; Rankings from AP Poll

The 1966 UCLA Bruins football team was an American football team that represented the University of California, Los Angeles in the Athletic Association of Western Universities (AAWU/Pac-8) during the 1966 NCAA University Division football season. In their second year under head coach Tommy Prothro, the Bruins compiled a 9–1 record (3–1 AAWU, second), and were ranked fifth in the final AP Poll.

UCLA's offensive leaders in 1966 were quarterback Gary Beban with 1,245 passing yards, running back Mel Farr with 809 rushing yards, and Harold Busby with 474 receiving yards.

Heading into the final game of the regular season against rival USC, UCLA was 2–1 in conference, 8–1 overall, and ranked fifth in the country. Featuring a "dream backfield" of All-Americans Beban and Farr, the Bruins lost only one game, at Washington in rainy Seattle, where Huskies' head coach Jim Owens had devoted his entire season to beating Prothro. UCLA had beaten UW the season before, 28–24, with Prothro's trick play, the Z-streak in which a receiver trots towards the sideline like he's going out of the game and then runs a streak pattern unguarded by the inattentive defender. USC was 4–0 in conference and 7–1 overall, upset on the road by the unranked Miami Hurricanes in late October. The Bruins and Trojans played a different number of conference games due to uneven scheduling caused by the newer AAWU members and schedules made years in advance (neither played Oregon or Washington State; USC shut out Oregon State). It was widely assumed that only losses would be considered and the winner of the UCLA-USC game would earn the Rose Bowl berth.

Beban broke his ankle the week before in the 10–0 home win over Stanford, but backup Norman Dow, making his only start at quarterback, led UCLA to a 14–7 win over the Trojans. That left USC with a 4–1 conference record (7–2 overall) and #5 UCLA with a 3–1 conference record (9–1) overall. Due to their win over USC, it was widely assumed UCLA would get the Rose Bowl berth. However, a vote the next Monday among the AAWU conference athletic directors awarded USC the Rose Bowl berth. It was speculated that the directors believed Beban could not play for UCLA in the Rose Bowl due to the broken ankle, thereby giving the Big Ten Conference representative, Purdue, a better chance to win. As it turned out, Beban could have played, but a bigger reason was that this was to make up for 1964 when Oregon State was voted in ahead of USC; the head coach of Oregon State that year was Prothro. Another speculation was the vote was against UCLA out of pure jealousy by the rest of the conference, which voted 7–1 for the clearly inferior team.

This vote deprived Prothro of being the first head coach to earn three consecutive Rose Bowl berths and UCLA athletic director J. D. Morgan called it a "gross injustice" and the "a dark day in UCLA and AAWU athletic history." Inflamed UCLA students who had gathered for the Rose Bowl celebration rally, took to the streets of Westwood in protest and actually blocked the 405 Freeway for a short time. Ironically, Morgan was the force behind establishing a tie-breaking method adopted by the conference one year later in which only loss column counted; the first tiebreaker was head-to-head results, followed by overall record. If there was still a tie, the Rose Bowl berth would go to the team that had not played in the Rose Bowl the longest. But it was too late for UCLA. In their final regular season game the next week, USC made the AAWU decision look bad by getting routed 51–0 at home in the L.A. Coliseum by #1 Notre Dame; they lost 14–13 to #7 Purdue in the Rose Bowl on January 2 and finished at 7–4.

== Schedule ==
Date	Opponent	Rank	Site	Result	Attendance	Source
September 17	Pittsburgh*	No. 4	Los Angeles Memorial Coliseum; Los Angeles, CA	W 57–14	35,692	
September 24	at Syracuse*	No. 2	Archbold Stadium; Syracuse, NY	W 31–12	35,000	
October 1	Missouri*	No. 2	Los Angeles Memorial Coliseum; Los Angeles, CA	W 24–15	32,649	
October 8	at Rice*	No. 2	Rice Stadium; Houston, TX	W 27–24	33,000	
October 15	Penn State*	No. 4	Los Angeles Memorial Coliseum; Los Angeles, CA	W 49–11	41,105	
October 22	at California	No. 3	California Memorial Stadium; Berkeley, CA (rivalry)	W 28–15	54,000	
October 29	Air Force*	No. 3	Los Angeles Memorial Coliseum; Los Angeles, CA	W 38–13	34,654	
November 5	at Washington	No. 3	Husky Stadium; Seattle, WA	L 3–16	55,536	
November 12	Stanford	No. 8	Los Angeles Memorial Coliseum; Los Angeles, CA	W 10–0	45,290	
November 19	No. 7 USC	No. 8	Los Angeles Memorial Coliseum; Los Angeles, CA (Victory Bell)	W 14–7	81,980	
*Non-conference game; Rankings from AP Poll released prior to the game

== Roster ==
1966 UCLA Bruins football team roster
Players
Coaches
Offense

Pos.	#	Name	Class
QB	16	Gary Beban	Jr
HB		Cornell Champion	Sr
QB		Norman Dow	Sr
HB	22	Mel Farr	Sr
FB		Rick Purdy
FB		Steve Stanley

Defense

Pos.	#	Name	Class
DT		Terry Donahue	Sr
LB		Dallas Grider

Special teams

Pos.	#	Name	Class
K		Kurt Zimmerman

Head coach

- Tommy Prothro (2nd year)

Coordinators/assistant coaches

Legend

- (C) Team captain
- (S) Suspended
- (I) Ineligible
- Injured
- Redshirt
