= 1966 USC Trojans football team =

American college football season

1966 USC Trojans football

AAWU champion

Rose Bowl, L 13–14 vs. Purdue
- Conference: Athletic Association of Western Universities

Ranking
- Coaches: No. 18
- Record: 7–4 (4–1 AAWU)
- Head coach: John McKay (7th season)
- Defensive coordinator: Dick Coury (1st season)
- Captains: Nate Shaw; Rod Sherman
- Home stadium: Los Angeles Memorial Coliseum

1966 Athletic Association of Western Universities football standings
	Conf.					Overall
Team	W		L		T	W		L		T
USC $	4	–	1	–	0	7	–	4	–	0
No. 5 UCLA	3	–	1	–	0	9	–	1	–	0
Oregon State	3	–	1	–	0	7	–	3	–	0
Washington	4	–	3	–	0	6	–	4	–	0
California	2	–	3	–	0	3	–	7	–	0
Oregon	1	–	3	–	0	3	–	7	–	0
Washington State	1	–	3	–	0	3	–	7	–	0
Stanford	1	–	4	–	0	5	–	5	–	0
$ – Conference champion; Rankings from AP Poll

The 1966 USC Trojans football team represented the University of Southern California (USC) in the 1966 NCAA University Division football season. In their seventh year under head coach John McKay, the Trojans compiled a 7–4 record (4–1 against conference opponents), won the Athletic Association of Western Universities (AAWU or Pac-8) championship, and outscored their opponents by a combined total of 199 to 128. The team was ranked #18 in the final Coaches Poll in late November; the final AP poll of early December included only the top ten this season

Quarterback Troy Winslow led the Trojans in passing, completing 82 of 138 passes for 1,023 yards with 6 touchdowns and 5 interceptions. Don McCall led the team in rushing with 127 carries for 560 yards and 5 touchdowns. Ron Drake led USC in receiving with 52 catches for 607 yards and four touchdowns.

== Schedule ==
Date	Opponent	Rank	Site	TV	Result	Attendance	Source
September 17	at Texas*	No. 9	Memorial Stadium; Austin, TX		W 10–6	42,000	
September 24	Wisconsin*	No. 5	Los Angeles Memorial Coliseum; Los Angeles, CA		W 38–3	52,325	
October 1	at Oregon State	No. 5	Civic Stadium; Portland, OR		W 21–0	29,217	
October 8	Washington	No. 6	Los Angeles Memorial Coliseum; Los Angeles, CA		W 17–14	55,960	
October 15	at Stanford	No. 5	Stanford Stadium; Stanford, CA (rivalry)		W 21–7	61,500	
October 22	Clemson*	No. 5	Los Angeles Memorial Coliseum; Los Angeles, CA		W 30–0	44,614	
October 28	at Miami (FL)*	No. 5	Orange Bowl; Miami, FL		L 7–10	51,156	
November 5	California^{†}	No. 9	Los Angeles Memorial Coliseum; Los Angeles, CA		W 35–9	47,199	
November 19	at No. 8 UCLA	No. 7	Los Angeles Memorial Coliseum; Los Angeles, CA (Victory Bell)		L 7–14	81,980	
November 26	No. 1 Notre Dame*	No. 10	Los Angeles Memorial Coliseum; Los Angeles, CA (rivalry)		L 0–51	88,520	
January 2, 1967	vs. No. 7 Purdue*		Rose Bowl; Pasadena, CA (Rose Bowl)	NBC	L 13–14	101,455	
*Non-conference game; ^{†}Homecoming; Rankings from AP Poll released prior to the game

== Game summaries ==
=== At Texas ===
USC at Texas

Team	1	2	3	4	Total
• No. 9 Trojans	3	7	0	0	10
Longhorns	0	0	0	6	6

- Date: September 17
- Location: Memorial Stadium, Austin, Texas
- Game attendance: 42,000
- TV announcers (ABC): Chris Schenkel, Bud Wilkinson

Scoring summary
Q1	USC	Rossivich 23 yard field goal	USC 3–0
Q2	USC	Winslow 9 yard run (Rossivich kick)	USC 10–0
Q4	TEX	Bradley 3 yard run (pass failed)	USC 10–6

=== Notre Dame ===
Notre Dame at USC

Team	1	2	3	4	Total
• No. 1 Fighting Irish	14	17	13	7	51
No. 10 Trojans	0	0	0	0	0

- Date: November 26
- Location: Los Angeles Memorial Coliseum, Los Angeles
- Game attendance: 88,520

Scoring summary
1	ND	Larry Conjar 2-yard run (Joe Azzaro kick)	ND 7-0
1	ND	Tom Schoen 40-yard interception return (Joe Azzaro kick)	ND 14-0
2	ND	Joe Azzaro 38-yard field goal	ND 17-0
2	ND	Jim Seymour 13-yard pass from Coley O'Brien (Joe Azzaro kick)	ND 24-0
2	ND	Jim Seymour 39-yard pass from Coley O'Brien (Joe Azzaro kick)	ND 31-0
3	ND	Dan Harshman 23-yard pass from Coley O'Brien (Joe Azzaro kick)	ND 38-0
3	ND	Nick Eddy 9-yard run (kick failed)	ND 44-0
4	ND	Dave Martin 33-yard interception return (Joe Azzaro kick)	ND 51-0

=== Purdue (Rose Bowl) ===
Purdue vs. USC

Team	1	2	3	4	Total
• No. 7 Boilermakers	0	7	7	0	14
Trojans	0	7	0	6	13

- Date: January 2
- Location: Rose Bowl, Pasadena, CA
- Game attendance: 101,438
- TV announcers (NBC): Curt Gowdy

Scoring summary
Q2	PUR	Perry Williams 1-yard run (Griese kick)	PUR 7–0
Q2	USC	McCall 1-yard run (Rossovich kick)	Tied 7–7
Q3	PUR	Perry Williams 1-yard run (Griese kick)	PUR 14–7
Q4	USC	Rod Sherman 19-yard pass from Troy Winslow (pass failed)	PUR 14–13
