= Mike Giddings =

American football coach (1933–2023)

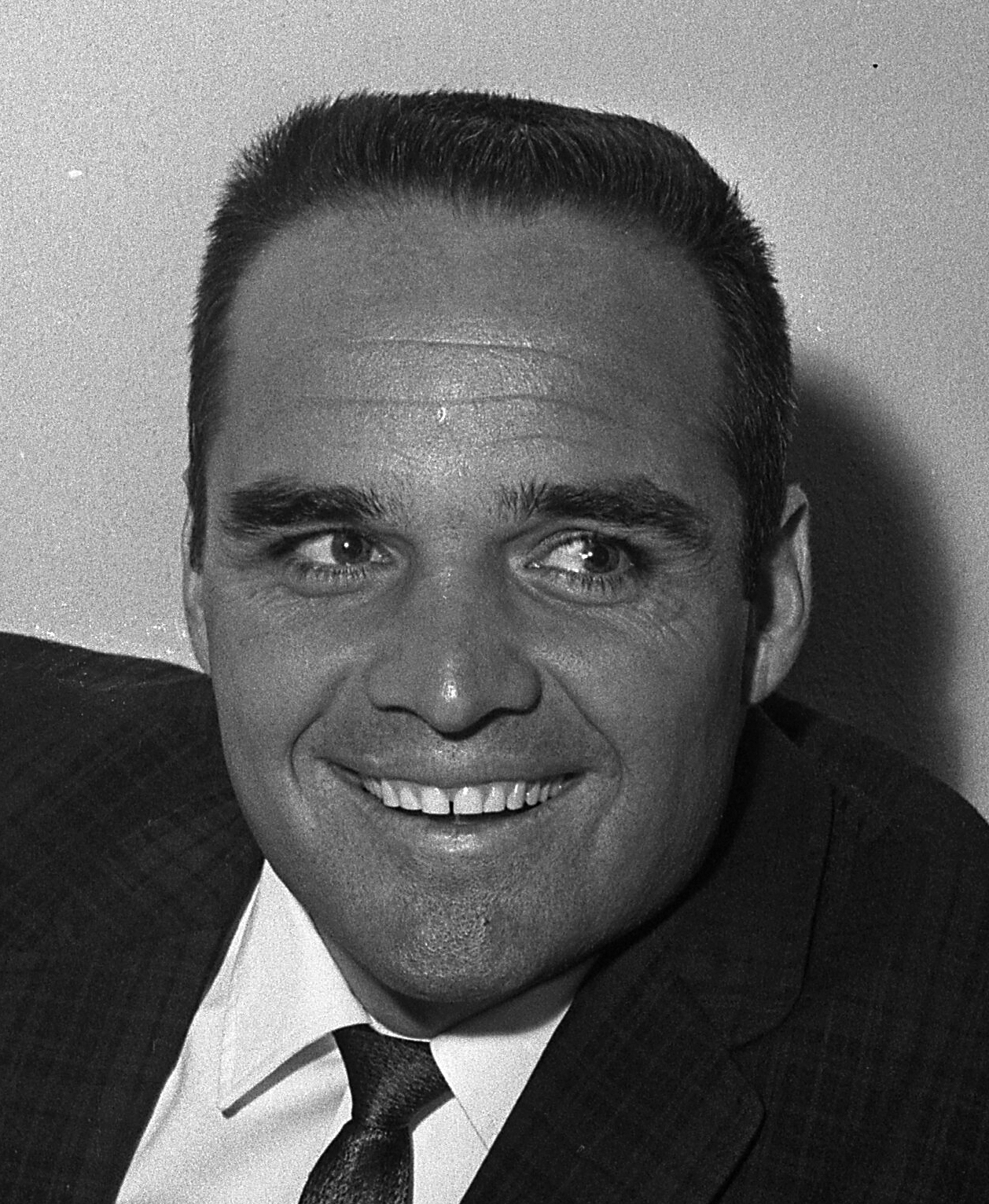
- Giddings in 1965

Biographical details
- Born: November 16, 1933; Newport Beach, California, U.S.
- Died: July 27, 2023 (aged 89); Newport Beach, California, U.S.

Playing career
- 1953–1954: California
- Position: Guard

Coaching career (HC unless noted)
- 1957–1958: Monrovia HS (CA) (Bee coach)
- 1959: Monrovia HS (CA)
- 1960: Glendale College (CA)
- 1961–1965: USC (assistant)
- 1966–1967: University of Utah
- 1968–1973: San Francisco 49ers (assistant)
- 1974–1975: The Hawaiians
- 1976: Denver Broncos (director pro scouting / assistant OL)
- 1979–1985: Newport Harbor HS (CA)

Head coaching record
- Overall: 9–12 (college); 7–2 (junior college); 13–18 (WFL)

Mike Giddings (November 16, 1933 – July 27, 2023) was an American football player, coach and scout. A 1951 graduate of South Pasadena High School where he was a multi-sport athlete, Giddings played college football for the California Golden Bears under head coach Pappy Waldorf. After graduation in 1955, Giddings was drafted and spent two years serving in the United States Marine Corps. Giddings began his coaching career in 1957 at Monrovia High School in Monrovia, California, where he coached football, basketball, and baseball while also teaching mathematics. After coaching the Bee team his first two years to a combined record of 15-1 (with the one loss by forfeit), Giddings was elevated to head coach of the varsity football team in 1959, leading the Wildcats to an 11–1 record and the CIF Southern Section Division 3-A finals. In 1960, he was named head coach at Glendale Community College in Glendale, California, and led the Vaqueros to a 7–2 record and a second-place finish in the Western State Conference. A year later, John McKay hired him as an assistant coach at the University of Southern California (USC), where he was a staff member of the 1962 USC Trojans football team, which won a national championship. He served a total of five years on McKay's staff.

Giddings served as the head football coach at the University of Utah from 1966 to 1967, compiling a record of 9–12. From 1968 through 1973 he was the linebackers coach for the San Francisco 49ers of the National Football League (NFL), coaching future Pro Football Hall of Fame linebacker Dave Wilcox, Skip Vanderbundt, Frank Nunley, and others. The 49ers won the NFC West three times while Giddings was there and Wilcox went to the Pro Bowl every year. After his time with the 49ers, Giddings was the head coach of The Hawaiians of the short-lived World Football League (WFL), in 1974 and 1975. In 1976, Giddings was the NFL's first pro player personnel director while also serving as an assistant offensive line coach for the Denver Broncos.

In 1977, Giddings created an NFL talent evaluation and analytics company called Proscout, Inc., which is now owned and run by his son Mike Giddings Jr. Among the first clients of Proscout were Don Shula, Paul Brown, and Bud Grant.

Giddings and Proscout are considered to be a pioneer in independent scouting and NFL analytics and created terms used in the NFL to this day, according to NFL analyst Charles Davis, who told a small group of scouts that Giddings "created the language we all use."

From 1982 to 1985, Giddings returned to the sideline as head coach of Newport Harbor High School's varsity football team. In four seasons, Giddings compiled a record of 34 wins, 12 losses and three ties, leading the Sailors to three Sea View League titles and advancing in the CIF Southern Section playoffs four times.

Mike Giddings died from complications of a stroke in Newport Beach, on July 27, 2023, at the age of 89.

== Head coaching record ==
=== College ===
Year	Team	Overall	Conference	Standing	Bowl/playoffs
Utah Utes (Western Athletic Conference) (1966–1967)
1966	Utah	5–5	3–2	T–2nd	
1967	Utah	4–7	2–3	4th	
Utah:		9–12	5–5		
Total:		9–12			

=== Junior College ===
Year	Team	Overall	Conference	Standing	Bowl/playoffs
Glendale Vaqueros (Western State Conference) (1960)
1960	Glendale	7–2	5–2	T–2nd	
Glendale:		7–2	5–2		
Total:		7–2			

=== High School ===
Year	Team	Overall	Conference	Standing	Bowl/playoffs
Monrovia Wildcats (Pacific League) (1959)
1959	Monrovia	11–1	5–0	1st	CIF-SS 3-A Division Finalists
Monrovia:		11–1	5–0		
Newport Harbor Sailors (Sea View League) (1982–1985)
1982	Newport Harbor	7–5	5–2	3rd	CIF-SS Central Conference Quarterfinalists
1983	Newport Harbor	8-3–1	6–1	1st	CIF-SS Central Conference Quarterfinalists
1984	Newport Harbor	9–1-2	6–0-1	T-1st	CIF-SS Central Conference Quarterfinalists
1985	Newport Harbor	10–3	6–1	T-1st	CIF-SS Central Conference Semifinalists
Newport Harbor:		34–12-3	23–4-1		
Total:		45–13-3			
