= Ron Billingsley =

American football player (1945–2017)

No. 86, 82
- Positions: Defensive tackle, Defensive end

Personal information
- Born: April 6, 1945; Florence, Alabama, U.S.
- Died: February 5, 2017 (aged 71); Gadsden, Alabama, U.S.
- Listed height: 6 ft 8 in (2.03 m)
- Listed weight: 290 lb (132 kg)

Career information
- High school: Gadsden
- College: Wyoming
- NFL draft: 1967: 1st round, 14th overall pick

Career history
- San Diego Chargers (1967-1970); Houston Oilers (1971–1972)

Career NFL/AFL statistics
- Fumble recoveries: 2
- Sacks: 8
- Stats at Pro Football Reference

Ronald Smith Billingsley (April 6, 1945 – February 5, 2017) was an American football player who was a defensive tackle in the American Football League (AFL) and National Football League (NFL). He played college football for the Wyoming Cowboys.

== Early life ==
Born in Florence, Alabama, Billingsley was a multi-sport athlete at Gadsden High School in Gadsden and graduated in 1963. He attended the University of Wyoming in Laramie, where he played college football for the Cowboys under head coach Lloyd Eaton. Billingsley received notice from AFL scouts during his senior season in 1966, when the Cowboys went 10–1, won the WAC championship, and defeated Florida State 28–20 in the Sun Bowl. He was selected to the All-WAC team as a senior.

== Pro football ==
The San Diego Chargers of the AFL selected Billingsley in the first round as the 14th overall pick of the 1967 NFL/AFL draft, the first year that the two leagues held a common draft after their merger agreement. He played for the Chargers for four seasons as a defensive starter. After the 1970 season, he was traded to the Houston Oilers. After another complete season as a starter at Houston, Billingsley experienced problems with an injury and only played in four games during the 1972 season. After 1972, he and Kent Nix were traded to the New Orleans Saints for Dave Parks, Tom Stincic, and Edd Hargett. However, because of the continued problems with his injury, he never played a game with the Saints and retired in 1973. During his NFL career, the 6 ft 8 in (2.03 m) Billingsley was known for being one of the tallest players in the league.

== In the news ==
On June 15, 2007, Billingsley rescued two fellow residents of his apartment complex in Glencoe, Alabama after one of the units caught fire.

== Death ==
Billingsley died at age 71 in Gadsden in 2017 and was buried at its Crestwood Cemetery.
