= 1966 Arizona Wildcats football team =

American college football season

1966 Arizona Wildcats football
- Conference: Western Athletic Conference
- Record: 3–7 (1–4 WAC)
- Head coach: Jim LaRue (8th season)
- Captains: Woody King; Roger Calderwood
- Home stadium: Arizona Stadium

1966 Western Athletic Conference football standings
	Conf.					Overall
Team	W		L		T	W		L		T
Wyoming $	5	–	0	–	0	10	–	1	–	0
BYU	3	–	2	–	0	8	–	2	–	0
Arizona State	3	–	2	–	0	5	–	5	–	0
Utah	3	–	2	–	0	5	–	5	–	0
Arizona	1	–	4	–	0	3	–	7	–	0
New Mexico	0	–	5	–	0	2	–	8	–	0
$ – Conference champion

The 1966 Arizona Wildcats football team represented the University of Arizona in the Western Athletic Conference (WAC) during the 1966 NCAA University Division football season. In their eighth and final season under head coach Jim LaRue, the Wildcats compiled a 3–7 record (1–4 against WAC opponents), finished in fifth place in the WAC, and were outscored by their opponents, 250 to 192. The team captains were Woody King and Roger Calderwood. The team played its home games in Arizona Stadium in Tucson, Arizona. LaRue was fired after the season due to a poor win–loss record.

The team's statistical leaders included Mark Reed with 2,368 passing yards, Brad Hubbert with 501 rushing yards, and Jim Greth with 1,003 receiving yards.

== Schedule ==
Date	Opponent	Site	Result	Attendance	Source
September 17	at Iowa*	Iowa Stadium; Iowa City, IA	L 20–31	45,000	
September 24	Kansas*	Arizona Stadium; Tucson, AZ	L 13–35	33,147	
October 1	at Wyoming	War Memorial Stadium; Laramie, WY	L 6–36	13,283	
October 8	at New Mexico	University Stadium; Albuquerque, NM (rivalry)	W 36–15	22,075	
October 22	Utah	Arizona Stadium; Tucson, AZ	L 19–24	28,600	
October 29	BYU	Arizona Stadium; Tucson, AZ	L 14–16		
November 5	at Oregon State*	Civic Stadium; Portland, OR	L 12–31	13,067	
November 12	Washington State*	Arizona Stadium; Tucson, AZ	W 28–18	23,000	
November 19	Iowa State*	Arizona Stadium; Tucson, AZ	W 27–24	23,904	
November 26	Arizona State	Arizona Stadium; Tucson, AZ (rivalry)	L 17–20	33,500	
*Non-conference game
