= 1966 Texas Western Miners football team =

American college football season

1966 Texas Western Miners football
- Conference: Independent
- Record: 6–4
- Head coach: Bobby Dobbs (2nd season)
- Home stadium: Sun Bowl

1966 NCAA University Division independents football records
	Conf.					Overall
Team	W		L		T	W		L		T
No. 1 Notre Dame		–		–		9	–	0	–	1
Colgate		–		–		8	–	1	–	1
No. 8 Georgia Tech		–		–		9	–	2	–	0
Army		–		–		8	–	2	–	0
Dayton		–		–		8	–	2	–	0
Houston		–		–		8	–	2	–	0
Memphis State		–		–		7	–	2	–	0
No. 9 Miami (FL)		–		–		8	–	2	–	1
Virginia Tech		–		–		8	–	2	–	1
Syracuse		–		–		8	–	3	–	0
Colorado State		–		–		7	–	3	–	0
New Mexico State		–		–		7	–	3	–	0
West Texas State		–		–		7	–	3	–	0
Villanova		–		–		6	–	3	–	0
Holy Cross		–		–		6	–	3	–	1
Southern Miss		–		–		6	–	4	–	0
Texas Western		–		–		6	–	4	–	0
Tulane		–		–		5	–	4	–	1
Florida State		–		–		6	–	5	–	0
Buffalo		–		–		5	–	5	–	0
Penn State		–		–		5	–	5	–	0
Air Force		–		–		4	–	6	–	0
Boston College		–		–		4	–	6	–	0
Navy		–		–		4	–	6	–	0
Utah State		–		–		4	–	6	–	0
Xavier		–		–		4	–	6	–	0
Pacific (CA)		–		–		4	–	7	–	0
San Jose State		–		–		3	–	7	–	0
Pittsburgh		–		–		1	–	9	–	0
Rankings from AP Poll

The 1966 Texas Western Miners football team was an American football team that represented Texas Western College (now known as the University of Texas at El Paso) as an independent during the 1966 NCAA University Division football season. In its second season under head coach Bobby Dobbs, the team compiled a 6–4 record and outscored opponents by a total of 293 to 187.

This was the final season for the program as Texas Western, as the school changed its name to the University of Texas at El Paso a year later.

== Schedule ==
Date	Opponent	Site	Result	Attendance	Source
September 17	at Arizona State	Sun Devil Stadium; Tempe, AZ	L 26–30	39,367	
September 24	at North Texas State	Fouts Field; Denton, TX	L 9–12	10,500	
October 1	New Mexico	Sun Bowl; El Paso, TX	W 51–3	34,459	
October 8	at West Texas State	Buffalo Bowl; Canyon, TX	W 9–3	19,400	
October 15	Arlington State	Sun Bowl; El Paso, TX	W 68–21	25,624	
October 22	San Jose State	Sun Bowl; El Paso, TX	W 35–0	28,263	
November 5	at BYU	BYU Stadium; Provo, UT	L 33–53	30,284	
November 12	Wyoming^{†}	Sun Bowl; El Paso, TX	L 7–31	29,174	
November 19	New Mexico State	Sun Bowl; El Paso, TX	W 28–14	25,521	
November 26	Utah	Sun Bowl; El Paso, TX	W 27–20	16,527	
^{†}Homecoming
