= 1966 Stanford Indians football team =

American college football season

1966 Stanford Indians football
- Conference: Athletic Association of Western Universities
- Record: 5–5 (1–4 AAWU)
- Head coach: John Ralston (4th season)
- Home stadium: Stanford Stadium

1966 Athletic Association of Western Universities football standings
	Conf.					Overall
Team	W		L		T	W		L		T
USC $	4	–	1	–	0	7	–	4	–	0
No. 5 UCLA	3	–	1	–	0	9	–	1	–	0
Oregon State	3	–	1	–	0	7	–	3	–	0
Washington	4	–	3	–	0	6	–	4	–	0
California	2	–	3	–	0	3	–	7	–	0
Oregon	1	–	3	–	0	3	–	7	–	0
Washington State	1	–	3	–	0	3	–	7	–	0
Stanford	1	–	4	–	0	5	–	5	–	0
$ – Conference champion; Rankings from AP Poll

The 1966 Stanford Indians football team represented Stanford University during the 1966 NCAA University Division football season. The Indians were coached by John Ralston in his fourth season. The team was 4–1 outside their conference, but won only one conference game, defeating rival California for the sixth straight season, establishing the longest winning streak by one team in the Big Game until the 2001 Stanford team surpassed the record.

== Schedule ==
Date	Opponent	Site	Result	Attendance	Source
September 17	San Jose State*	Stanford Stadium; Stanford, CA (rivalry)	W 25–21	36,000	
September 24	at Minnesota*	Memorial Stadium; Minneapolis, MN	L 21–35	43,351	
October 1	Tulane*	Stanford Stadium; Stanford, CA	W 33–14	26,000–26,500	
October 8	at Oregon	Civic Stadium; Portland, OR	L 3–7	17,612	
October 15	No. 5 USC	Stanford Stadium; Stanford, CA (rivalry)	L 7–21	61,500	
October 22	at Illinois*	Memorial Stadium; Champaign, IL	W 6–3	56,561	
October 29	Washington	Stanford Stadium; Stanford, CA	L 20–22	38,500	
November 5	Air Force*	Stanford Stadium; Stanford, CA	W 21–6	36,000	
November 12	at No. 8 UCLA	Los Angeles Memorial Coliseum; Los Angeles, CA	L 0–10	45,290	
November 19	at California	California Memorial Stadium; Berkeley, CA (Big Game)	W 13–7	58,000 (70,000 paid)	
*Non-conference game; Rankings from AP Poll released prior to the game

== Players drafted by the NFL ==
Player	Position	Round	Pick	NFL club
Dave Lewis	Quarterback	5	109	New York Giants
Mike Hibler	Linebacker	5	131	Oakland Raiders
Tim Sheehan	Center	10	261	Houston Oilers
