= 1966 BYU Cougars football team =

American college football season

1966 BYU Cougars football
- Conference: Western Athletic Conference
- Record: 8–2 (3–2 WAC)
- Head coach: Tommy Hudspeth (3rd season)
- Home stadium: Cougar Stadium

1966 Western Athletic Conference football standings
	Conf.					Overall
Team	W		L		T	W		L		T
Wyoming $	5	–	0	–	0	10	–	1	–	0
BYU	3	–	2	–	0	8	–	2	–	0
Arizona State	3	–	2	–	0	5	–	5	–	0
Utah	3	–	2	–	0	5	–	5	–	0
Arizona	1	–	4	–	0	3	–	7	–	0
New Mexico	0	–	5	–	0	2	–	8	–	0
$ – Conference champion

The 1966 BYU Cougars football team was an American football team that represented Brigham Young University (BYU) as a member of the Western Athletic Conference (WAC) during the 1966 NCAA University Division football season. In their third season under head coach Tommy Hudspeth, the Cougars compiled an overall record of 8–2 with a mark of 3–2 against conference opponents, tied for second place in the WAC, and outscored opponents by a total of 269 to 163.

Quarterback Virgil Carter led the country with 2,545 yards of total offense; he also led the team with 2,182 passing yards and 56 points scored. On November 5, 1966, he set new NCAA single-game records with 513 passing yards and 599 yards of total offense against Texas Western. Carter's totals of 513 passing yards and 599 yards of total offense stood as BYU school records until broken by Ty Detmer in 1991.

The team's other statistical leaders included John Ogden with 906 rushing yards and Phil Odle with 920 receiving yards.

Six BYU players were selected to the all-conference team: wide receiver Phil Odle; guard Grant Wilson; quarterback Virgil Carter; fullback John Ogden; linebacker Curg Belcher; and safety Bobby Roberts.

== Schedule ==
Date	Opponent	Site	Result	Attendance	Source
September 24	at San Jose State*	Spartan Stadium; San Jose, CA	W 19–9	17,000	
September 30	Colorado State*	Cougar Stadium; Provo, UT	W 27–24	25,023	
October 8	Utah State*	BYU Stadium; Provo, UT (rivalry)	W 27–7	29,335	
October 14	Arizona State	Cougar Stadium; Provo, UT	L 7–10	20,119	
October 22	at New Mexico	University Stadium; Albuquerque, NM	W 33–6	18,524	
October 29	at Arizona	Arizona Stadium; Tucson, AZ	W 16–14		
November 5	Texas Western*	Cougar Stadium; Provo, UT	W 53–33	30,284	
November 12	at Utah	Ute Stadium; Salt Lake City, UT (rivalry)	W 35–13	28,776	
November 19	Wyoming	Cougar Stadium; Provo, UT	L 14–47	38,333	
November 26	Pacific (CA)*	Cougar Stadium; Provo, UT	W 38–0	14,845	
*Non-conference game

== Game summaries ==
=== At Utah ===
BYU Cougars (6–1) at Utah Redskins (5–1)

Quarter	1	2	3	4	Total
BYU	7	21	7	0	35
Utah	7	0	6	0	13

at Ute Stadium, Salt Lake City, Utah

- Date: November 12, 1966
- Game weather: Clear
- Game attendance: 28,776
- Box Score

Game information

First quarter

- BYU – Kent Oborn 22-yard pass from Virgil Carter (Ben Laverty kick). BYU 7–0.
- UTAH – Merlin Diggs 15-yard pass from Darrell Bigelow (Jerry Pullman kick). Tie 7–7.

Second quarter

- BYU – Kent Oborn 11-yard pass from Virgil Carter (Ben Laverty kick). BYU 14–7.
- BYU – Kent Oborn 74-yard punt return (Ben Laverty kick). BYU 21–7.
- BYU – Casey Boyette 62-yard pass from Virgil Carter (Ben Laverty kick). BYU 28–7.

Third quarter

- UTAH – Ben Woodson 40-yard run (pass failed). BYU 28–13.
- BYU – Virgil Carter 3-yard run (Ben Laverty kick). BYU 35–13.

Fourth quarter

- No scoring

Top passers

- BYU – Virgil Carter – 18/31, 255 yards, 3 TD, INT
- UTAH – Darrell Bigelow – 7/25, 65 yards, TD, INT

Top rushers

- BYU – John Ogden – 23 rushes, 101 yards
- UTAH – Ben Woodson – 19 rushes, 106 yards, TD

Top receivers

- BYU – Casey Boyette – 7 receptions, 131 yards, TD
- UTAH – Terry Baker – 2 receptions, 26 yards

== Personnel ==
1966 BYU Cougars football team roster
Players
Coaches
Offense

Pos.	#	Name	Class
QB	14	Virgil Carter	Sr
WR	22	Casey Boyett	So
TB/WB	22	Kent Oborn	Sr
WR	88	Phil Odle	Jr

Defense

Pos.	#	Name	Class

Special teams

Pos.	#	Name	Class

Head coach

- Tommy Hudspeth

Coordinators/assistant coaches

Legend

- (C) Team captain
- (S) Suspended
- (I) Ineligible
- Injured
- Redshirt

Roster
