= 1966 Oregon State Beavers football team =

American college football season

1966 Oregon State Beavers football
- Conference: Athletic Association of Western Universities

Ranking
- Coaches: No. 19
- Record: 7–3 (3–1 AAWU)
- Head coach: Dee Andros (2nd season)
- Captains: Bob Grim; Russ Kuhns
- Home stadium: Parker Stadium; Civic Stadium

1966 Athletic Association of Western Universities football standings
	Conf.					Overall
Team	W		L		T	W		L		T
USC $	4	–	1	–	0	7	–	4	–	0
No. 5 UCLA	3	–	1	–	0	9	–	1	–	0
Oregon State	3	–	1	–	0	7	–	3	–	0
Washington	4	–	3	–	0	6	–	4	–	0
California	2	–	3	–	0	3	–	7	–	0
Oregon	1	–	3	–	0	3	–	7	–	0
Washington State	1	–	3	–	0	3	–	7	–	0
Stanford	1	–	4	–	0	5	–	5	–	0
$ – Conference champion; Rankings from AP Poll

The 1966 Oregon State Beavers football team represented Oregon State University during the 1966 NCAA University Division football season. Four home games were played on campus in Corvallis at Parker Stadium and two at Civic Stadium in Portland. Under their second season head coach Dee Andros, the Beavers were 7–3 overall and 3–1 in the Athletic Association of Western Universities (AAWU, later Pacific-8 Conference, or Pac-8). Only one of the four conference teams from the state of California was on the schedule; champion USC shut out OSU in Portland.

Following a 1–3 start, OSU won its last six games, and were ranked nineteenth in the final UPI Coaches Poll.

The starting quarterbacks this season were senior Paul Brothers and sophomore Steve Preece. Workhorse senior fullback Pete Pifer became the school's all-time leading rusher, overtaking Sam Baker.

== Schedule ==
Date	Opponent	Site	Result	Attendance	Source
September 17	at Michigan*	Michigan Stadium; Ann Arbor, MI	L 0–41	56,907	
September 24	at Iowa*	Iowa Stadium; Iowa City, IA	W 17–3	43,276	
October 1	No. 5 USC	Civic Stadium; Portland, OR	L 0–21	29,217	
October 8	Northwestern*	Parker Stadium; Corvallis, OR	L 6–14	22,497	
October 15	Idaho*^{†}	Parker Stadium; Corvallis, OR	W 14–7	16,144	
October 22	at Arizona State*	Sun Devil Stadium; Tempe, AZ	W 18–17	29,118	
October 29	at Washington State	Rogers Field; Pullman, WA	W 41–13	18,500	
November 5	Arizona*	Civic Stadium; Portland, OR	W 31–12	13,067	
November 12	Washington	Parker Stadium; Corvallis, OR	W 24–12	21,347	
November 19	Oregon	Parker Stadium; Corvallis, OR (Civil War)	W 20–15	23,700	
*Non-conference game; ^{†}Homecoming; Rankings from AP Poll released prior to the game

== Roster ==
1966 Oregon State Beavers football team roster
Players
Coaches
Offense

Pos.	#	Name	Class
HB	33	Jerry Belcher	So
QB	19	Paul Brothers	Sr
SE	84	Roger Cantlon	So
C	52	John Didion	Sr
C	51	Rockne Freitas	Sr
WB	26	Bob Grim (C)	Sr
SE	90	Harry Gunner	Jr
OT	79	Jeff Hardrath	Jr
WB	22	Billy Main	So
G	63	Dave Marlette	Jr
FB	48	Pete Pifer	Sr
QB	14	Steve Preece	So
G	60	Joe Reid	Sr
OT	73	Kent Scott	So
G	62	Clyde Smith	So
OT	74	Roger Stalick	So
TE	88	Mike Sullivan	Sr
HB	21	Don Summers	So
OT	75	Jim Wilkin	Sr

Defense

Pos.	#	Name	Class
DE	86	Tom Coccione	Sr
DG	64	Skip Diaz	Sr
S	23	Scott Eaton	Sr
LB	46	Bill Enyart	So
DE	82	Mike Foote	So
DG	78	Mark Gartung	Sr
LB	57	Jim Godfrey	Jr
DT	67	Tom Greerty	Jr
DE	80	Greg Hartman	Sr
LB	44	Russ Kuhns (C)	Sr
DT	66	Jess Lewis	So
DB	24	Charlie Olds	Jr
DT	65	Dennis Rozario	Sr
DG	71	Jon Sandstrom	So
LB	42	Skip Vanderbundt	Jr
DB	25	Don Welch	So

Special teams

Pos.	#	Name	Class
P	19	Paul Brothers	Sr
PK	17	Mike Haggard	Jr
P	89	Gary Houser	Jr

Head coach

- Dee Andros (2nd year)

Coordinators/assistant coaches

- Sam Boghosian (OL)
- Rich Brooks (DL)
- Johnny Easterbrook
- Gene Felker
- Ed Knecht
- Bud Riley (DB)

Legend

- (C) Team captain
- (S) Suspended
- (I) Ineligible
- Injured
- Redshirt

== Game summaries ==
=== Oregon ===
Civil War

Team	1	2	3	4	Total
Oregon	0	0	0	15	15
• Oregon St	3	10	0	7	20

- Date: November 19
- Location: Parker Stadium, Corvallis, Oregon
- Game start: 1:30 pm PST
- Game attendance: 23,700
- Game weather: Early rain, mud

Scoring summary
1		OSU	Mike Haggard 29-yard field goal	OSU 3-0
2		OSU	Paul Brothers 17-yard run (Mike Haggard kick)	OSU 10-0
2		OSU	Mike Haggard 34-yard field goal	OSU 13-0
4		ORE	Scott Cress 25-yard pass from Mike Brundage (Mike Brundage kick)	OSU 13-7
4		OSU	Pete Pifer 14-yard run (Mike Haggard kick)	OSU 20-7
4	0:00	ORE	Jim Smith 96-yard fumble return (Mike Brundage to Lynn Hendrickson pass)	OSU 20-15

On a very muddy field at Parker Stadium, Beaver fullback Pete Pifer became the first in AAWU history to run for more than 1,000 yards in two consecutive seasons with 130 yards on 31 carries. Pifer and his backfield teammates, Paul Brothers and Bob Grim, combined for 284 total yards of the Beavers' offense.
