= Rick Egloff =

American gridiron football player

Profile
- Position: Quarterback

Personal information
- Born: c. November 2, 1944 (age 82); Denver, Colorado, U.S.
- Listed height: 6 ft 2 in (1.88 m)
- Listed weight: 195 lb (88 kg)

Career information
- High school: Mullen (Denver, Colorado)
- College: Wyoming
- NFL draft: 1967: 6th round, 155th overall pick

Career history
- 1967: Sacramento Buccaneers
- 1968: Montreal Alouettes

Richard Joseph Egloff (born November 2, 1944) is an American former football player who played professionally in the Canadian Football League (CFL).

A graduate of Mullen High School in Denver, Egloff played college football at the University of Wyoming in Laramie, where he starred as a quarterback from 1964 to 1966. In his senior season in 1966, he led the Cowboys to a conference title and a 28–20 victory over Florida State in the Sun Bowl; he ran and passed for a touchdown that game, and Wyoming finished with a 10–1 record.

In the 1967 NFL/AFL draft, Egloff was selected by the Oakland Raiders of the American Football League in the sixth round (155th overall), then traded to the Denver Broncos in April 1968, but did not play with either team. In 1968, he played four games with the Montreal Alouettes of the Canadian Football League.

He now resides in the foothills of Colorado where he runs an Italian restaurant.
