= 1966 Oregon Ducks football team =

American college football season

1966 Oregon Ducks football
- Conference: Athletic Association of Western Universities
- Record: 3–7 (1–3 AAWU)
- Head coach: Len Casanova (16th season)
- Captains: Mike Brundage; Ross Carter
- Home stadium: Hayward Field; Civic Stadium

1966 Athletic Association of Western Universities football standings
	Conf.					Overall
Team	W		L		T	W		L		T
USC $	4	–	1	–	0	7	–	4	–	0
No. 5 UCLA	3	–	1	–	0	9	–	1	–	0
Oregon State	3	–	1	–	0	7	–	3	–	0
Washington	4	–	3	–	0	6	–	4	–	0
California	2	–	3	–	0	3	–	7	–	0
Oregon	1	–	3	–	0	3	–	7	–	0
Washington State	1	–	3	–	0	3	–	7	–	0
Stanford	1	–	4	–	0	5	–	5	–	0
$ – Conference champion; Rankings from AP Poll

The 1966 Oregon Ducks football team represented the University of Oregon in the Athletic Association of Western Universities (AAWU) during the 1966 NCAA University Division football season. Three home games were played on campus in Eugene at Hayward Field and one at Civic Stadium in Portland.

Under sixteenth-year head coach Len Casanova, the Ducks were 3–7 overall and 1–3 in the AAWU (later Pacific-8 Conference, or Pac-8). Only one of its four teams from the state of California was on the schedule, Stanford in Portland, the sole conference victory. This season’s record was the worse for the Ducks since 1952.

Oregon tied for sixth in the AAWU and were outscored 129 to 118. The team's statistical leaders included Mike Barnes with 710 passing yards, Steve Jones with 542 rushing yards, and Scott Cress with 402 receiving yards.

This was the final season for Casanova as head coach and for varsity football at Hayward Field; Autzen Stadium debuted in 1967 with new head coach Jerry Frei, who was previously the offensive line coach. Casanova became the athletic director and retired in 1970.

== Schedule ==
Date	Opponent	Site	Result	Attendance	Source
September 17	at Oklahoma*	Oklahoma Memorial Stadium; Norman, OK	L 0–17	51,100	
September 24	Utah*	Hayward Field; Eugene, OR	L 14–17	16,500	
October 1	San Jose State*	Hayward Field; Eugene, OR	L 7–21	16,000	
October 8	Stanford	Civic Stadium; Portland, OR	W 7–3	17,612	
October 15	at Air Force*	Falcon Stadium; Colorado Springs, CO	W 17–6	27,289	
October 22	at Washington	Husky Stadium; Seattle, WA (rivalry)	L 7–10	52,750	
October 29	vs. Idaho*	old Bronco Stadium; Boise, ID	W 28–7	11,500	
November 5	Washington State^{†}	Hayward Field; Eugene, OR	L 13–14	17,500	
November 12	at Arizona State*	Sun Devil Stadium; Tempe, AZ	L 10–14	30,642	
November 19	at Oregon State	Parker Stadium; Corvallis, OR (Civil War)	L 15–20	23,700	
*Non-conference game; ^{†}Homecoming
