= 1966 California Golden Bears football team =

American college football season

1966 California Golden Bears football
- Conference: Athletic Association of Western Universities
- Record: 3–7 (2–3 AAWU)
- Head coach: Ray Willsey (3rd season)
- Home stadium: California Memorial Stadium

1966 Athletic Association of Western Universities football standings
| | Conf. | | | | | Overall |
| Team | W | | L | | T | W | | L | | T |
|---|---|---|---|---|---|---|---|---|---|---|
| USC $ | 4 | – | 1 | – | 0 | 7 | – | 4 | – | 0 |
| No. 5 UCLA | 3 | – | 1 | – | 0 | 9 | – | 1 | – | 0 |
| Oregon State | 3 | – | 1 | – | 0 | 7 | – | 3 | – | 0 |
| Washington | 4 | – | 3 | – | 0 | 6 | – | 4 | – | 0 |
| California | 2 | – | 3 | – | 0 | 3 | – | 7 | – | 0 |
| Oregon | 1 | – | 3 | – | 0 | 3 | – | 7 | – | 0 |
| Washington State | 1 | – | 3 | – | 0 | 3 | – | 7 | – | 0 |
| Stanford | 1 | – | 4 | – | 0 | 5 | – | 5 | – | 0 |
$ – Conference champion; Rankings from AP Poll

The 1966 California Golden Bears football team was an American football team that represented the University of California, Berkeley in the Athletic Association of Western Universities (AAWU) during the 1966 NCAA University Division football season. In their third year under head coach Ray Willsey, the Golden Bears compiled a 3–7 record (2–3 in AAWU, fifth), and were outscored 197 to 131. Home games were played at California Memorial Stadium in Berkeley, California.

California's statistical leaders on offense were quarterback Barry Bronk with 965 passing yards, Rick Bennett with 319 rushing yards, and Jerry Bradley with 473 receiving yards.

== Schedule ==
| Date | Opponent | Site | Result | Attendance | Source |
|---|---|---|---|---|---|
| September 17 | at Washington State | Joe Albi Stadium; Spokane, WA | W 21–6 | 23,300 | |
| September 24 | No. 9 Michigan* | California Memorial Stadium; Berkeley, CA | L 7–17 | 41,302 | |
| October 1 | Pittsburgh* | California Memorial Stadium; Berkeley, CA | W 30–15 | 42,701 | |
| October 8 | San Jose State* | California Memorial Stadium; Berkeley, CA | L 0–24 | 34,525 | |
| October 15 | at Washington | Husky Stadium; Seattle, WA | W 24–20 | 54,650 | |
| October 22 | No. 3 UCLA | California Memorial Stadium; Berkeley, CA (rivalry) | L 15–28 | 54,000 | |
| October 29 | at Penn State* | Beaver Stadium; University Park, PA | L 15–33 | 37,000 | |
| November 5 | at No. 9 USC | Los Angeles Memorial Coliseum; Los Angeles, CA | L 9–35 | 47,199 | |
| November 12 | Army* | California Memorial Stadium; Berkeley, CA | L 3–6 | 31,000 | |
| November 19 | Stanford | California Memorial Stadium; Berkeley, CA (Big Game) | L 7–13 | 58,000 (70,000 paid) | |
*Non-conference game; Rankings from AP Poll released prior to the game
