= Hayward Field =

Track and field stadium in Eugene, Oregon, U.S.

Coordinates: 44.042°N 123.071°W

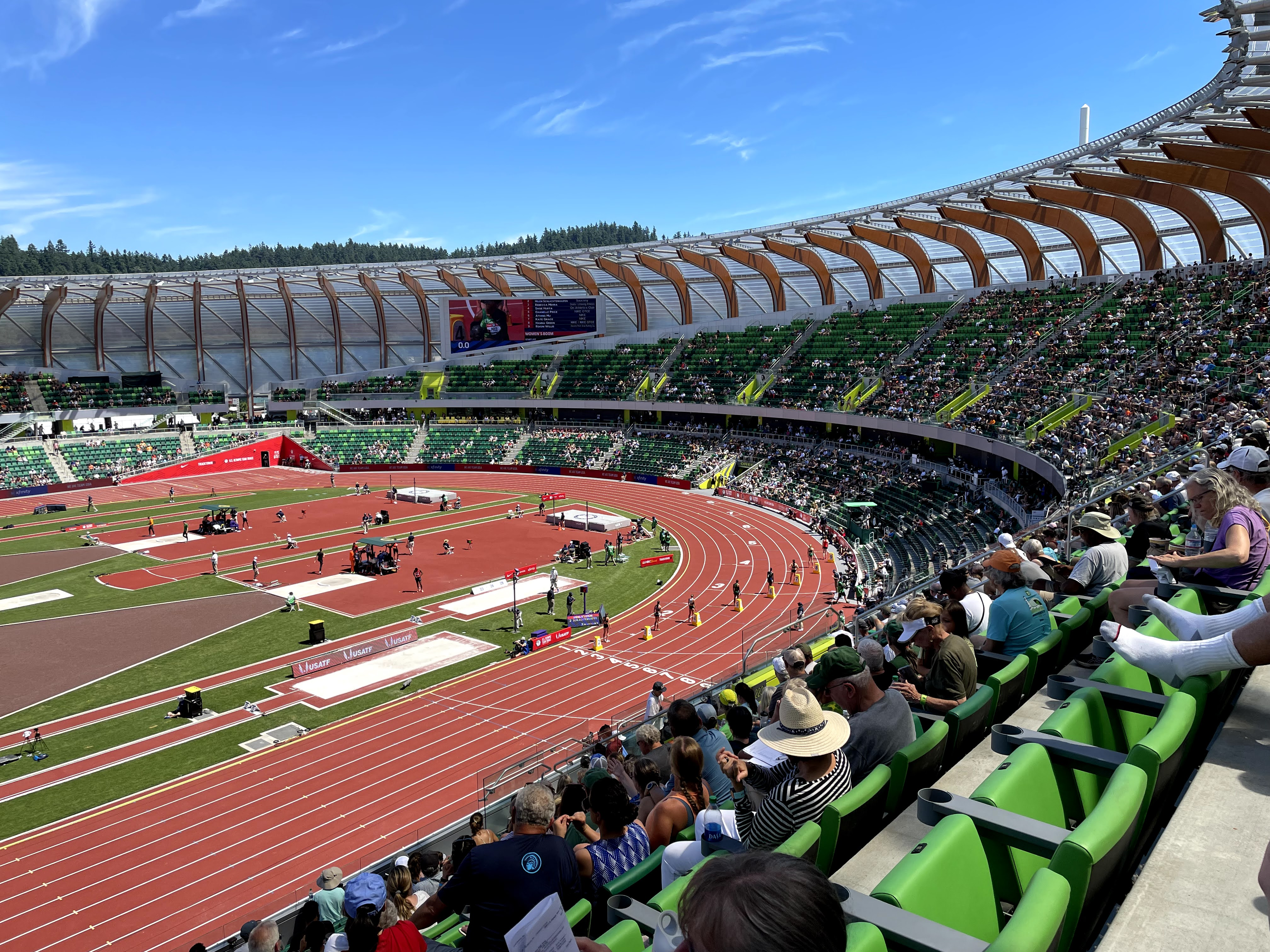
- View towards the northwest in June 2021
- Interactive map of Hayward Field
- Address: 1580 E. 15th Street; Eugene, Oregon, 97403
- Elevation: 420 feet (130 m) AMSL
- Owner: University of Oregon
- Operator: University of Oregon
- Capacity: 12,650 (expandable to 25,000)
- Surface: Natural grass infield; Dirt / sawdust (1919–1936); Track surface: Beynon Sports Surface; BSS-2000; (1970-present)

Construction
- Opened: 1919; 107 years ago
- Renovated: 1975, 2004, 2018–2020
- Architects: Ellis Lawrence (1925); SRG Partnership (2020)

Tenants
- Oregon Ducks track and field; Oregon Ducks football (1919–1966)

Hayward Field is a track and field stadium located on the campus of the University of Oregon in Eugene. It has been the home of the university's track and field teams since 1921, and was the on-campus home of the varsity football team from 1919 through 1966. It is one of three World Athletics Class 1 Facilities in the United States, alongside E.B. Cushing Stadium and John McDonnell Field. Its elevation is approximately 420 feet (130 m) above sea level and its infield has a conventional north–south orientation. The Pacific Ocean is approximately fifty miles (80 km) to the west, separated by the Oregon Coast Range. Track and field competitions at the stadium are organized by the not-for-profit organization TrackTown USA.

Hayward Field was named after track coach Bill Hayward (1868–1947), who ran the Ducks' program from 1904 to 1947. It has been redeveloped and renovated multiple times throughout its history, with the latest occurring in 2018–20, in which the stadium was entirely rebuilt with financing by UO's philanthropic community – alumnus Phil Knight was the main donor.

== History ==
=== Early years and football (1919–1966) ===
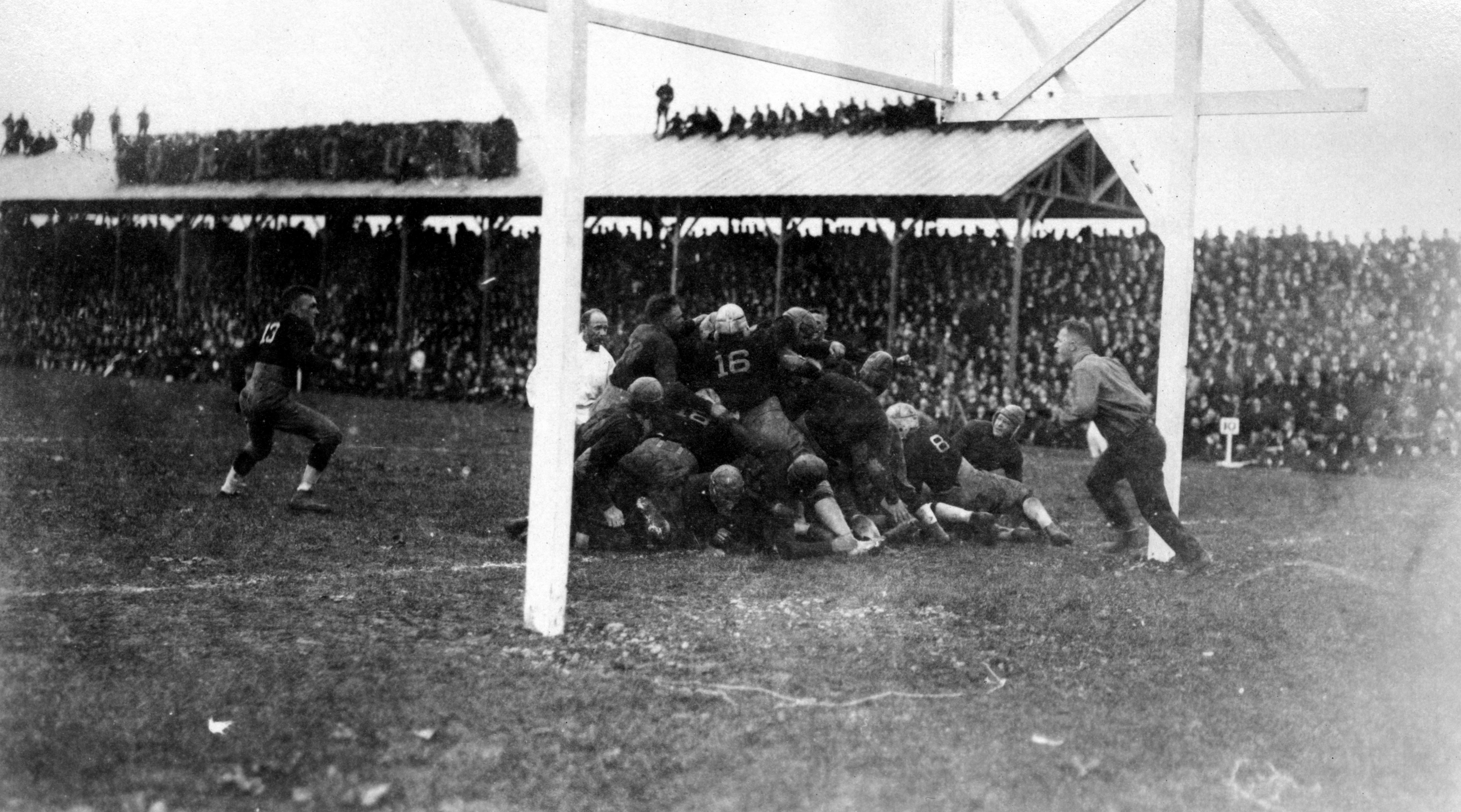
University of Oregon football game played at Hayward Field in 1920. Spectators can be seen on the roof of the east grandstand.

Hayward was built 107 years ago in 1919 to replace Kincaid Field, and was intended to primarily serve the school's football program. During halftime of the season opener that year, the venue was named for track coach Hayward; he was busy working as the team's trainer during the break, and did not know of the honor until the following day. In 1921, a six-lane cinder track was constructed around the football field. Renowned architect Ellis F. Lawrence designed the west grandstand, which opened in 1925. A natural grass field was first installed at Hayward Field in 1937; the surface was previously a mixture of dirt and sawdust. That field surface was not unique in the Northwest in the Pacific Coast Conference: Bell Field in Corvallis, Multnomah Stadium in Portland, and Husky Stadium in Seattle made similar transitions to natural grass in this period of time.

For most of its existence as a football venue, it was notorious for its poor playing conditions in rainy weather. Despite several improvement efforts, the field didn't drain very well even after the switch to grass, and often turned to mud. In 1949, a 28-row grandstand in the south end zone was constructed; with temporary bleachers in adjacent corners, the venue's capacity was raised to 22,500 for football. Even with these changes, by the 1950s, it was obvious that Hayward Field was at the end of its useful life as a football venue. It was one of the smallest stadiums in the University Division (forerunner of Division I), and only 9,000 tickets were available to the general public. While nearly every seat was protected from the elements, it had little else going for it. It was in such poor condition that coaches deliberately steered prospective recruits away from it on their visits to Eugene.

As a result, outside of the Civil War game with Oregon State, the Ducks played their higher-attended home games (in practice, nearly all of their conference games) at Portland's Multnomah Stadium, 110 miles (180 km) away. Athletic director Leo Harris chafed at making the Ducks make the two-hour trip to Portland three times a year, and pressed for a new stadium on land just north of campus. School president Arthur Flemming was initially skeptical of the project, and asked Skidmore, Owings & Merrill to evaluate whether it was feasible to expand Hayward Field to up to 40,000 seats (believed to be the minimum capacity to justify moving the entire home slate to Eugene), build a new stadium on Hayward's footprint, or build a new stadium on the northern site. The study definitively ruled out Hayward Field as the site for a new or renovated football stadium. SOM believed that city officials would never sign off on expanding Hayward Field since it hadn't been built to code, and there was no room to build a new stadium on Hayward's footprint. Even if there had been room for a new stadium, the nearby streets could not handle the traffic and parking needed for a full slate of home games.

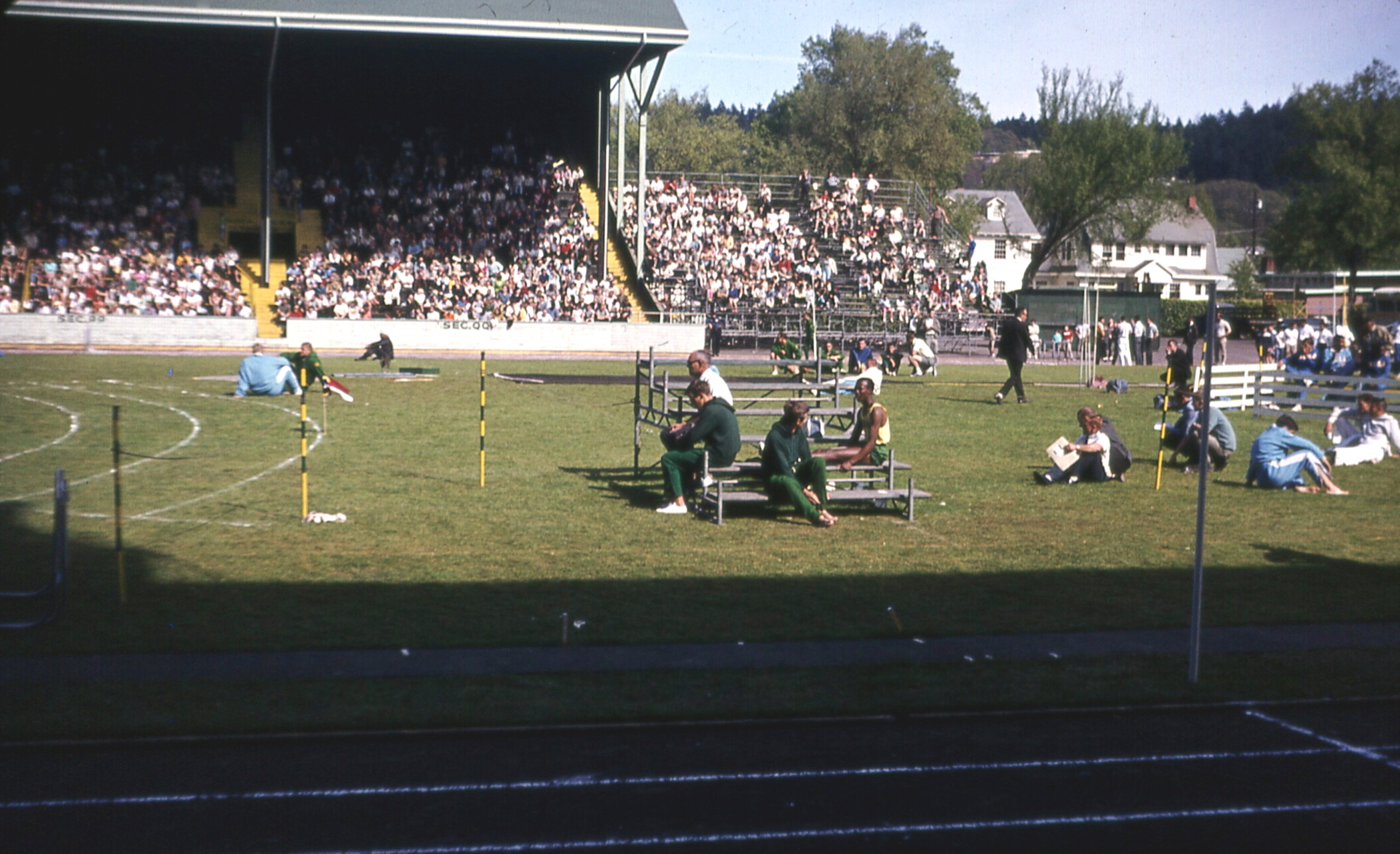
A 1966 dual-meet at Hayward Field between Oregon and UCLA, a year prior to the expansion of its track and upgrade of its field.

As a result, Hayward Field's final varsity football game was played in 1966, a one-point loss to Washington State on November 5. Its replacement, Autzen Stadium, opened in September 1967, and Hayward Field became a facility solely for track and field, except for a few freshman team football games.

=== Athletics and renovations (1967–2017) ===
The track was widened to eight lanes late in the summer of 1969 and converted to an all-weather surface that autumn. Its first synthetic track was Pro-Turf, a urethane and sand composite which led to a hard and fast surface; it produced many world records and gained a reputation as the world's fastest track. Light in color, it was resurfaced with the same in 1976.

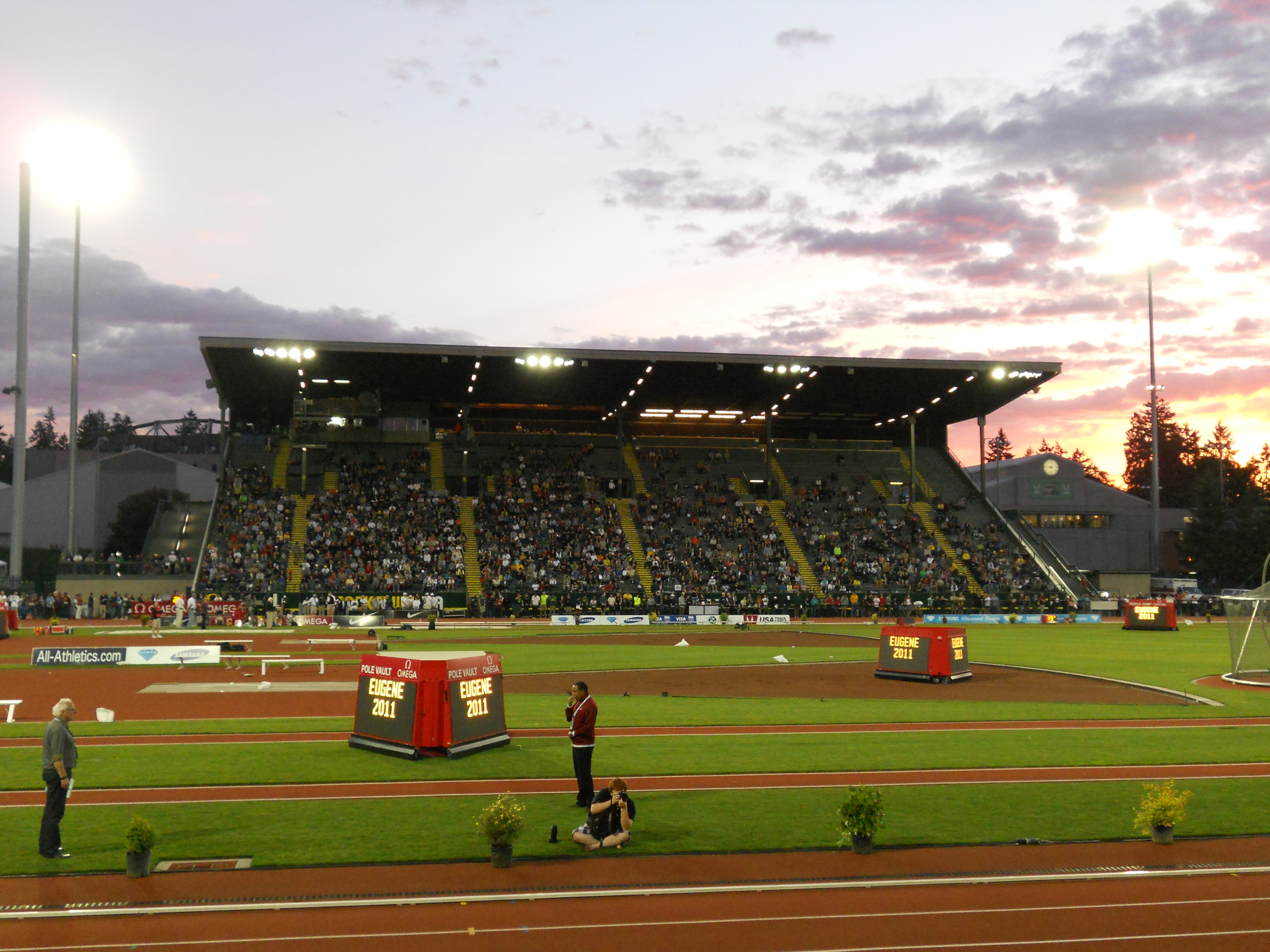
Hayward Field's western grandstand, opened in 1974.

Decayed and in disrepair, the original west grandstand was built in 1925 and its roof added in 1938. It was demolished in September 1973, and the finish line (for most events) was moved to the track's northeast corner for the 1974 season. The new west grandstand, also made of wood with a capacity of 4,300 spectators, was ready for use in March 1975. The Prefontaine Classic originated as the "Hayward Field Restoration Meet" in 1973, to help raise funds for a new west grandstand.

The track was converted to metric in the summer of 1987, its lap length changed from 440 yards (402.336 m) to 400 meters, a reduction of 2.336 m (7 ft 8 in). The geometry of the track was changed to the international configuration, with shorter straights and longer turns. This widening of the infield required the relocation of the 300-foot (90 m), 500-ton east grandstand, which was raised and moved 35 ft 9.5 in (10.91 m) east in March. The surface was again Pro-Turf, but with different surface properties; a textured top layer and a reddish color. In addition, a 200 m warmup track was added to the southwest of the main track, along with a new hammer throw area and a weight room facility.

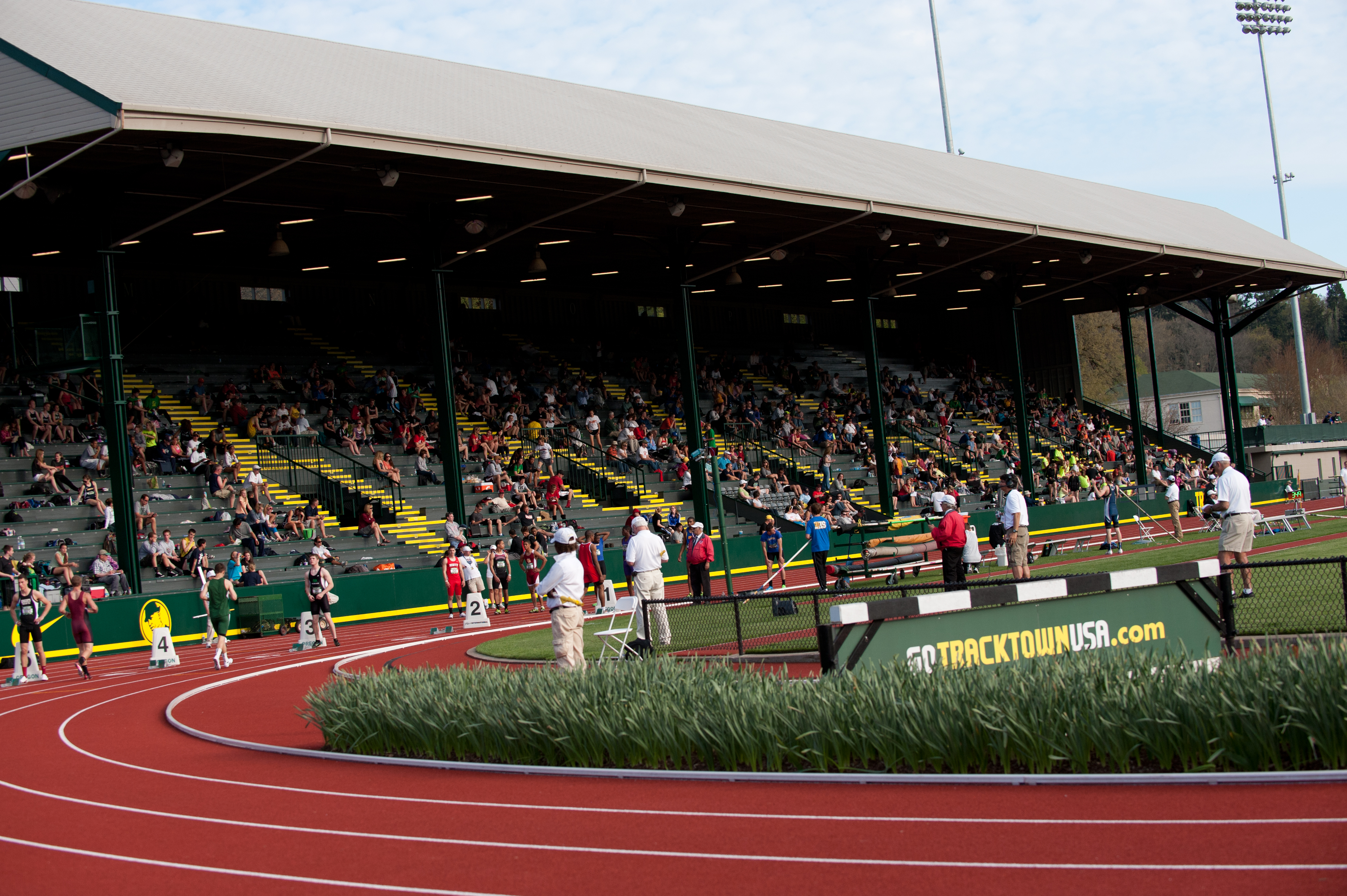
A track meet at Hayward Field in April 2012, with the stadium's original eastern grandstand visible.

A state-of-the-art scoreboard was added in 1991, which gave unofficial times and competitors' placings just seconds after race completion. This project was completed with a great deal of help from the Oregon Track Club as well as the efforts of many others. Bill McChesney SR who is the father of the Oregon 5K record holder and 1980 Olympian, Bill McChesney, was president of the OTC at the time and was one of the key members of the community that made this project possible.

A major renovation in 2004 added a new entrance named Powell Plaza. It also moved the practice track, expanded it to 400 meters, and replaced the aging fencing bordering the complex. After Hayward Field was awarded the 2008 U.S. Olympic Trials, it underwent additional renovations in 2007. Eight light poles were installed for televised night events, and the crowned infield was removed and reconfigured. A walkway was added behind the west grandstand, and a new scoreboard was installed, thanks to a donation by alumnus Phil Knight and Nike.

=== New Hayward Field (2018–present) ===
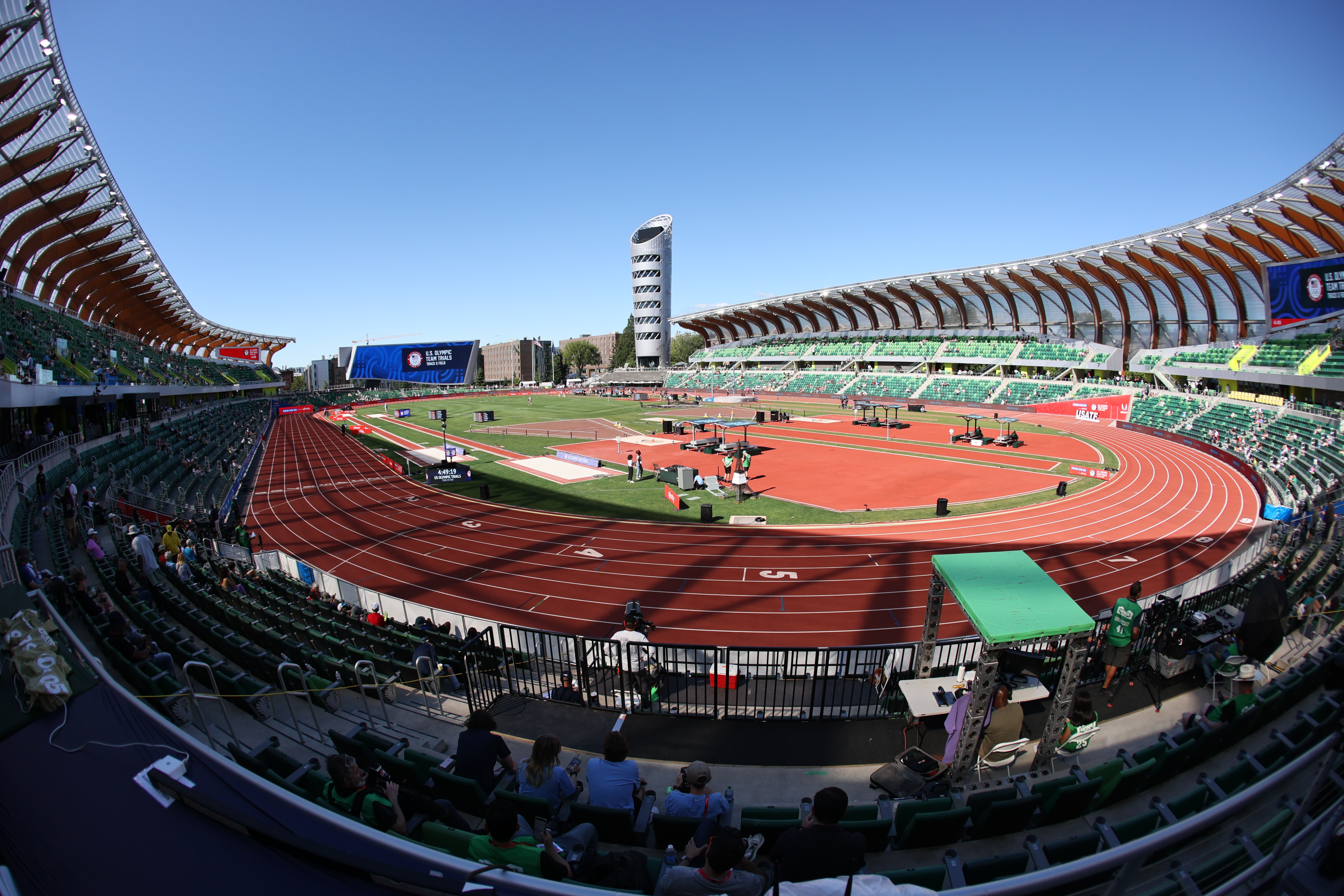
Panoramic view of the redeveloped Hayward Field, pictured in June 2024.

On April 17, 2018, it was announced that from the summer of 2018 to 2020, Hayward field would undergo a major renovation. The renovation would demolish both current grandstands and establish a new stadium around the track with a capacity of 12,650, expandable to nearly 25,000 for major events. Moreover, the renovation saw Hayward Field being equipped with underground training facilities, which allow Oregon Track and Field Athletes to continue their training through rough weather. As a result, Hayward Field has a training room, two lockers rooms for male and female athletes, a team room, a meeting room, an indoor pole vault pit, an indoor shot-put pit, an indoor sand pit, a nutrition shop, a barber shop and an indoor weight room.

== Facilities ==
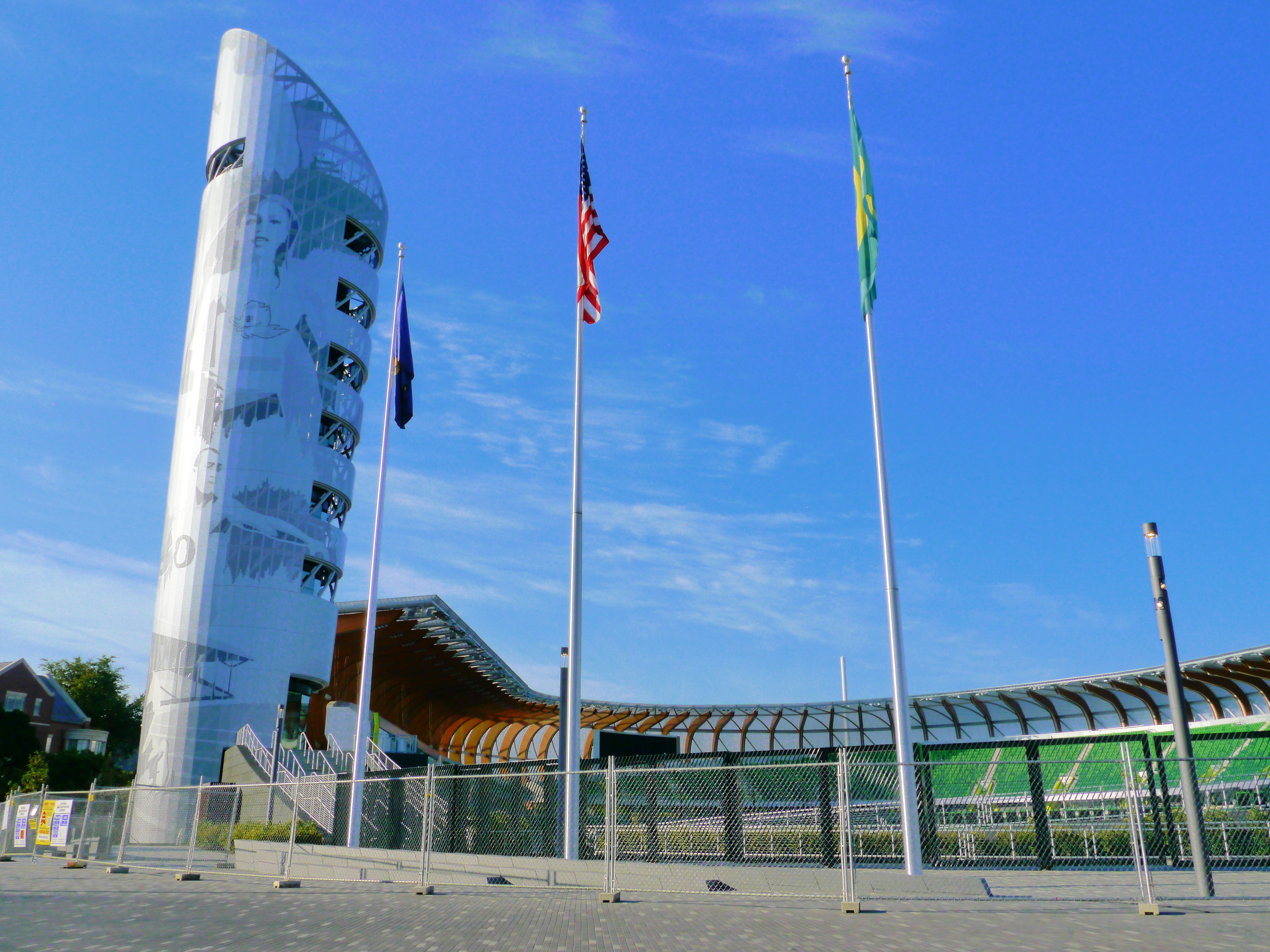
Hayward Field Tower, pictured in August 2020.

Hayward Field features a BSS-2000 running track manufactured by Beynon Sports Surfaces and a natural grass infield. The venue is rated as a Class 1 Facility by World Athletics – the governing body's highest rating – and, as of June 2025, is one of only three Class 1 venues in the United States alongside E.B. Cushing Stadium in College Station, Texas, and John McDonnell Field in Fayetteville, Arkansas.

The Hayward Field Tower was inspired by the Olympic Torch. It has nine stories and was completed in 2020 by Zahner. It stands on the northeast corner of the stadium and depicts five figures, reflecting the first 100 years of Oregon Track and Field: Bill Bowerman, Steve Prefontaine, Raevyn Rogers, Ashton Eaton and Otis Davis. After a donation in 1990 by Bill Bowerman (1911–1999), UO's longtime track coach (1948–1973), the 15,000-square-foot (1,400 m^{2}) Bowerman Building was added to the northwest of the track, housing locker rooms, U of O track memorabilia and the university's International Institute for Sport and Human Performance. Bowerman began a public jogging program at Hayward Field in 1963 after a visit to New Zealand, inspired by coach Arthur Lydiard.

== Events ==
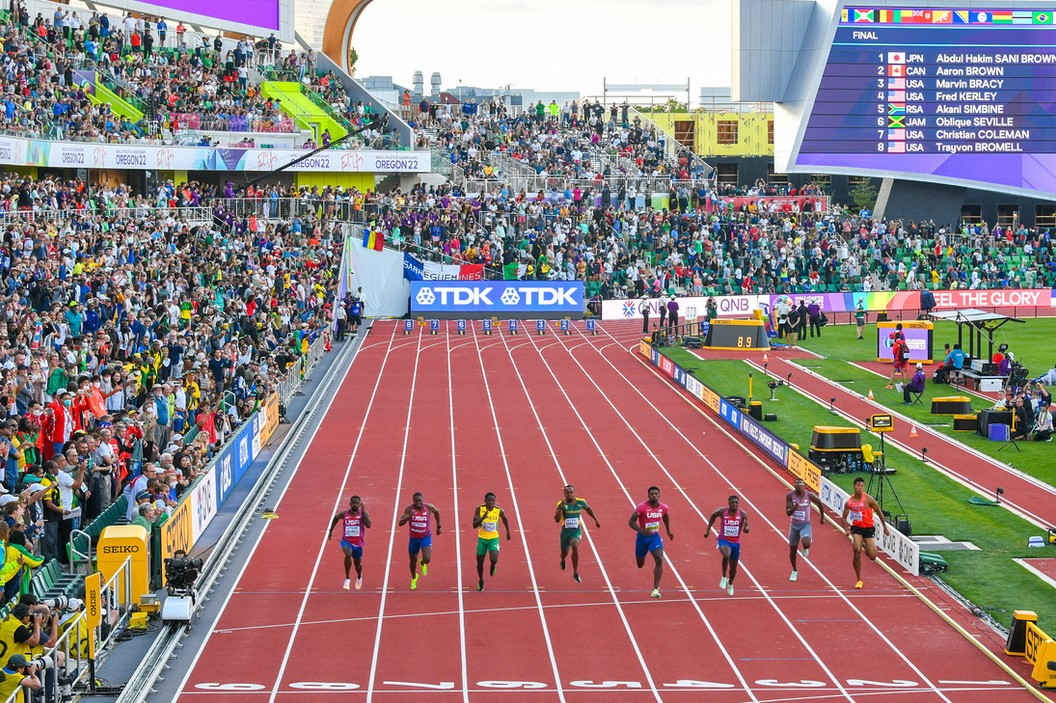
A scene during the men's 100 metres final of the 2022 World Athletics Championships at Hayward Field.

Hayward Field has hosted USATF championships in 1986, 1993, 1999, 2001, 2009, 2011, 2015, and 2022 and the Olympic trials in 1972, 1976, 1980, 2008, 2012, 2016, 2020, and 2024. It has been the site of numerous NCAA championships, USATF Elite Running Circuit events, and the annual Nike Prefontaine Classic. The Olympic trials were hosted in 2021 at the new stadium.

The World Junior Championships, now known as the World U20 Championships, were held at Hayward Field in 2014. The venue hosted the World Athletics Championships in 2022, the first time the event had been staged in the United States.

== In popular culture ==
Hayward Field appeared in a fictionalized staging of the Olympic trials for the 1982 film Personal Best, in the 1998 biopic of Steve Prefontaine Without Limits, and Alexi Pappas's Tracktown (2016). It was in the background of the ROTC drill scene of Animal House (1978).
