= Virgil Carter =

American football player (born 1945)

No. 15, 11, 7, 9
- Position: Quarterback

Personal information
- Born: November 9, 1945 (age 80); Annabella, Utah, U.S.
- Listed height: 6 ft 1 in (1.85 m)
- Listed weight: 192 lb (87 kg)

Career information
- High school: Folsom (Folsom, California)
- College: BYU
- NFL draft: 1967: 6th round, 142nd overall pick

Career history
- Chicago Bears (1968–1969); Cincinnati Bengals (1970–1972); Chicago Fire (1974); San Diego Chargers (1975); Chicago Bears (1976)

Awards and highlights
- NCAA individual total offense leader (1966); NFL completion percentage leader (1971); 2× WAC Offensive Player of the Year (1965, 1966)

Career NFL statistics
- Passing attempts: 785
- Passing completions: 425
- Completion percentage: 54.1%
- TD–INT: 29–31
- Passing yards: 5,063
- Passer rating: 69.9
- Rushing yards: 640
- Rushing touchdowns: 8
- Stats at Pro Football Reference

Virgil R. Carter (born November 9, 1945) is an American former professional football player who was a quarterback in the National Football League (NFL) and the World Football League (WFL) from 1967 through 1976. He played college football for the BYU Cougars.

== College career ==
Carter was the first notable passing quarterback to play at Brigham Young University, whose football program became well known for producing great passers. While at BYU, Carter set six national, 19 conference, and 24 school records and was an academic All-American. Carter began his college career under first-year coach Tommy Hudspeth, taking over a program that had produced two winning seasons in the previous ten years. BYU went 3–6–1 that first year, but Carter threw for over a thousand yards.

The Cougars won the Western Athletic Conference championship in 1965, going 4–1 in WAC play and 6–4 overall to win the first conference championship in program history. The following year, the Cougars won eight out of ten games despite finishing second in the WAC, and Carter threw for over two thousand yards. Notably, the success BYU experienced with Carter at quarterback influenced then-assistant coach LaVell Edwards to later adopt a pass-oriented offense after replacing Hudspeth as head coach in 1972.

=== College statistics ===
Year	Team	Passing								Rushing			
Year	Team	Comp	Att	Pct	Yds	Avg	TD	Int	Rate	Att	Yds	Avg	TD
1964	BYU	66	193	34.2	1,154	6.0	9	14	85.3	107	388	3.6	5
1965	BYU	120	250	48.0	1,789	7.2	20	13	124.1	121	474	3.9	4
1966	BYU	141	293	48.1	2,182	7.4	21	16	123.4	95	363	3.8	9
Career		327	736	44.4	5,125	7.0	50	43	113.7	323	1225	3.8	18

== Pro football career ==
Carter was selected 142nd overall by the Chicago Bears in the sixth round of the 1967 NFL/AFL draft, After complaining about lack of playing time after the 1969 season he was waived by the Bears and briefly joined the Buffalo Bills. After Cincinnati Bengals' quarterback Greg Cook was injured during the 1970 preseason, Carter was traded by the Bills to the Bengals in exchange for a draft choice. He led the NFL in pass completion percentage in 1971 and was third in overall passing. His best game of that season was the opener, in which the Bengals defeated the Philadelphia Eagles 37–14. Carter completed 22 of 30 attempts for 273 yards, three touchdowns, and no interceptions. In the following year, he split time with Ken Anderson before Anderson took sole possession of the starting job. In 1973, the Bengals decided to go with Anderson as the starting quarterback, but Carter had to miss the entire season due to a broken collarbone.

In 1974, Carter was traded to the San Diego Chargers for quarterback Wayne Clark, but opted to sign with the Chicago Fire of the new World Football League. The Chargers attempted to void the trade under the claim that Carter's collarbone had not healed, but the league approved the trade anyway.

Carter was the WFL's leading passer in 1974 until an injury sidelined him in week eleven. He finished the season with 358 attempts completing 195 for 2629 yards. He threw 27 touchdown passes and was intercepted 16 times. The Fire offense in 1974 is compared today to the West Coast offense.

In 1975, he went to the Chargers, then was traded to the Bears during the season, and retired after the 1976 season.

Carter was a highly intelligent quarterback, who blossomed in Cincinnati under the West Coast system implemented by Bill Walsh, then the Bengals' quarterbacks coach and later head coach of the San Francisco 49ers. In his first stint with the Bears, Carter earned a master's degree from Northwestern University in Evanston, and while in Cincinnati with the Bengals taught statistics and mathematics at Xavier University.

== Work in Football Analytics ==
Carter is credited as one of the founding developers of a metric in football known as "Expected Points". Under the advising of Northwestern University professor Robert E. Machol, Carter analyzed over 8000 plays from the 1969 NFL season, averaging results of 10-yard strips to determine the expected number of points a team should generate from each position on the field. This work was later expanded in several works (Carroll, Palmer, and Thorn - Hidden Game of Football, Yurko et al. - nflWAR) and is the foundation of several aspects of analytics in the game.

== See also ==
- List of NCAA major college football yearly total offense leaders
