= Jerry Marion =

American football player (born 1944)

No. 45, 85, 81, 80
- Position: End

Personal information
- Born: August 7, 1944 (age 82); Bakersfield, California, U.S.
- Listed height: 5 ft 10 in (1.78 m)
- Listed weight: 175 lb (79 kg)

Career information
- High school: Bakersfield
- College: Wyoming (1963–1966)
- NFL draft: 1966: 10th round, 143rd overall pick
- AFL draft: 1966: Red Shirt 11th round, 92nd overall pick

Career history
- Wheeling Ironmen (1967); Pittsburgh Steelers (1967); Ohio Valley Ironmen (1968–1969); Indianapolis Capitols (1970)

Career NFL statistics
- Receptions: 1
- Receiving yards: 16
- Stats at Pro Football Reference

Jerry Richard Louis Marion (born August 7, 1944) is an American former professional football player who was an end for one season with the Pittsburgh Steelers of the National Football League (NFL). He was selected by the Steelers in the tenth round of the 1966 NFL draft after playing college football for the Wyoming Cowboys.

== Early life and college ==
Jerry Richard Louis Marion was born on August 7, 1944, in Bakersfield, California. He attended Bakersfield High School in Bakersfield.

At the University of Wyoming, he was a member of the Cowboys from 1963 to 1966 and a three-year letterman from 1964 to 1966.

== Professional career ==
Marion was selected by the Pittsburgh Steelers in the tenth round, with the 143rd overall pick, of the 1966 NFL draft and by the Boston Patriots in the 11th round, with the 92nd overall, of the 1966 AFL Redshirt draft.

He played for the Wheeling Ironmen of the Continental Football League (COFL) in 1967, catching 28 passes for 358 yards and five touchdowns while also returning eight punts for 85 yards.

Marion appeared in seven games for the Steelers during the 1967 NFL season, recording one reception for 16 yards and one punt return for two yards.

He returned to the newly-renamed Ohio Valley Ironmen in 1968, totaling 17 catches for 225 and three touchdowns, three carries for 52 yards and one touchdown, 23 punt returns for 300 yards and one touchdown, 29 kick returns for 679 yards and two touchdowns, and one defensive interception. In 1969, Marion recorded 24 receptions for 372 yards and one touchdown and five kick returns for 104 yards.

Marion played for the Indianapolis Capitols of the Atlantic Coast Football League in 1970, catching 20 passes for 464 yards and three touchdowns, returning 24 punts for 277 yards and three touchdowns, and returning 17 kicks for 456 yards.

== Personal life ==
Marion is the father of NFL player Brock Marion.
