= 1966 Miami Redskins football team =

American college football season

1966 Miami Redskins football

MAC co-champion
- Conference: Mid-American Conference
- Record: 9–1 (5–1 MAC)
- Head coach: Bo Schembechler (4th season)
- Home stadium: Miami Field

1966 Mid-American Conference football standings
	Conf.					Overall
Team	W		L		T	W		L		T
Miami (OH) +	5	–	1	–	0	9	–	1	–	0
Western Michigan +	5	–	1	–	0	7	–	3	–	0
Bowling Green	4	–	2	–	0	6	–	3	–	0
Ohio	3	–	3	–	0	5	–	5	–	0
Kent State	2	–	4	–	0	4	–	6	–	0
Toledo	1	–	5	–	0	2	–	7	–	1
Marshall	1	–	5	–	0	2	–	8	–	0
+ – Conference co-champions

The 1966 Miami Redskins football team was an American football team that represented Miami University during the 1966 NCAA University Division football season. In their fourth season under head coach Bo Schembechler, the Redskins won the Mid-American Conference (MAC) championship, compiled a 9–1 record (5–1 against MAC opponents), and outscored all opponents by a combined total of 229 to 76.

The team's statistical leaders included quarterback Bruce Matte with 845 passing yards, Joe Kozar with 633 rushing yards, and John Erisman with 600 receiving yards.

== Schedule ==
Date	Opponent	Site	Result	Attendance	Source
September 17	at Indiana*	Seventeenth Street Stadium; Bloomington, IN	W 20–10	28,538	
September 24	at Xavier*	Xavier Stadium; Cincinnati, OH	W 27–3	14,610	
October 1	Western Michigan	Miami Field; Oxford, OH	W 26–7	13,581	
October 8	Kent State	Miami Field; Oxford, OH	W 7–0	16,038	
October 15	at Marshall	Fairfield Stadium; Huntington, WV	W 12–0	4,000	
October 22	at Ohio	Peden Stadium; Athens, OH (rivalry)	W 33–13	20,200	
October 29	Bowling Green	Miami Field; Oxford, OH	L 14–17	12,942	
November 5	at Toledo	Glass Bowl; Toledo, OH	W 24–12	9,011	
November 12	Dayton*	Miami Field; Oxford, OH	W 38–6	17,000	
November 26	at Cincinnati*	Nippert Stadium; Cincinnati, OH (rivalry)	W 28–8	11,500	
*Non-conference game
