= 1966 Marshall Thundering Herd football team =

American college football season

1966 Marshall Thundering Herd football
- Conference: Mid-American Conference
- Record: 2–8 (1–5 MAC)
- Head coach: Charlie Snyder (8th season)
- Captains: Andy Socha; Dennis Miller
- Home stadium: Fairfield Stadium

1966 Mid-American Conference football standings
	Conf.					Overall
Team	W		L		T	W		L		T
Miami (OH) +	5	–	1	–	0	9	–	1	–	0
Western Michigan +	5	–	1	–	0	7	–	3	–	0
Bowling Green	4	–	2	–	0	6	–	3	–	0
Ohio	3	–	3	–	0	5	–	5	–	0
Kent State	2	–	4	–	0	4	–	6	–	0
Toledo	1	–	5	–	0	2	–	7	–	1
Marshall	1	–	5	–	0	2	–	8	–	0
+ – Conference co-champions

The 1966 Marshall Thundering Herd football team was an American football team that represented Marshall University in the Mid-American Conference (MAC) during the 1966 NCAA University Division football season. In its eighth season under head coach Charlie Snyder, the team compiled a 2–8 record (1–5 against conference opponents), tied for last place in the MAC, and was outscored by a total of 210 to 119. Andy Socha and Dennis Miller were the team captains. The team played its home games at Fairfield Stadium in Huntington, West Virginia.

== Schedule ==
Date	Opponent	Site	Result	Attendance	Source
September 17	at Morehead State*	Jayne Stadium; Morehead, KY	W 27–20	9,500	
September 24	Eastern Kentucky*	Fairfield Stadium; Huntington, WV	L 6–26	9,200	
October 1	at Toledo	Glass Bowl; Toledo, OH	L 7–23	14,152	
October 8	at Quantico Marines*	Quantico, VA	L 7–10	5,000	
October 15	Miami (OH)	Fairfield Stadium; Huntington, WV	L 0–12	4,000	
October 22	Louisville*^{†}	Fairfield Stadium; Huntington, WV	L 15–35	10,000	
October 29	Western Michigan	Fairfield Stadium; Huntington, WV	L 29–35	4,100	
November 5	at Bowling Green	Doyt Perry Stadium; Bowling Green, OH	L 6–14	10,300	
November 12	Kent State	Fairfield Stadium; Huntington, WV	W 16–7	5,000	
November 19	at Ohio	Peden Stadium; Athens, OH (rivalry)	L 6–28		
*Non-conference game; ^{†}Homecoming
