= 1966 Lehigh Engineers football team =

American college football season

1966 Lehigh Engineers football
- Conference: Middle Atlantic Conference
- University Division
- Record: 0–9 (0–4 MAC)
- Head coach: Fred Dunlap (2nd season)
- Captains: Dick Bauer; Richard Pochman
- Home stadium: Taylor Stadium

1966 Middle Atlantic Conference football standings
	Conf.					Overall
Team	W		L		T	W		L		T
University Division
Delaware x	6	–	0	–	0	6	–	3	–	0
Gettysburg	4	–	2	–	0	7	–	2	–	0
Temple	2	–	2	–	0	6	–	3	–	0
Lafayette	2	–	3	–	0	3	–	6	–	0
Bucknell	2	–	3	–	0	4	–	5	–	0
Hofstra	1	–	3	–	0	2	–	8	–	0
Lehigh	0	–	4	–	0	0	–	9	–	0
Northern College Division
Wilkes x	7	–	0	–	0	8	–	0	–	0
Upsala	6	–	1	–	0	6	–	2	–	0
Delaware Valley	4	–	2	–	0	5	–	3	–	0
Lycoming	4	–	3	–	0	4	–	4	–	0
Moravian	4	–	4	–	1	4	–	4	–	1
Albright	4	–	4	–	0	4	–	5	–	0
Juniata	3	–	3	–	0	4	–	4	–	0
Wagner	1	–	3	–	1	2	–	6	–	1
Susquehanna *	1	–	2	–	0	3	–	6	–	0
Southern College Division
Swarthmore x	6	–	0	–	1	6	–	0	–	1
Drexel	4	–	1	–	0	6	–	1	–	1
Franklin & Marshall	3	–	2	–	2	3	–	3	–	2
Dickinson	4	–	3	–	1	4	–	3	–	1
Western Maryland	2	–	3	–	0	4	–	5	–	0
Ursinus	2	–	4	–	1	2	–	5	–	1
Muhlenberg	2	–	6	–	1	2	–	6	–	1
Lebanon Valley	2	–	6	–	0	2	–	6	–	0
Pennsylvania Military	2	–	6	–	0	2	–	7	–	0
Haverford	1	–	5	–	0	1	–	6	–	0
Johns Hopkins	0	–	4	–	2	0	–	6	–	2
West Chester *	0	–	0	–	0	8	–	1	–	0
x – Division champion/co-champions; * – Ineligible for championship due to insufficient conference games

The 1966 Lehigh Engineers football team was an American football team that represented Lehigh University during the 1966 NCAA College Division football season. Lehigh lost all its games and placed last in both the Middle Atlantic Conference, University Division, and in the Middle Three Conference.

In their second year under head coach Fred Dunlap, the Engineers compiled an 0–9 record. Dick Bauer and Richard Pochman were the team captains.

Lehigh's winless (0–4) record against MAC University Division foes was the worst in the league. Lehigh was also winless (0–2) against its Middle Three rivals, losing to both Lafayette and Rutgers.

Lehigh played its home games at Taylor Stadium on the university campus in Bethlehem, Pennsylvania.

== Schedule ==
Date	Opponent	Site	Result	Attendance	Source
September 24	at Penn*	Franklin Field; Philadelphia, PA	L 28–38	7,794–7,900	
October 1	Drexel*	Taylor Stadium; Bethlehem, PA	L 9–12	3,500	
October 8	Rutgers	Taylor Stadium; Bethlehem, PA	L 14–42	8,750	
October 15	at Gettysburg	Memorial Field; Gettysburg, PA	L 13–31	5,800	
October 22	No. 14 Delaware^{†}	Taylor Stadium; Bethlehem, PA (rivalry)	L 0–41	13,132	
October 29	at Colgate*	Andy Kerr Stadium; Hamilton, NY	L 15–21	4,500	
November 5	Davidson*	Taylor Stadium; Bethlehem, PA	L 27–34	7,500–7,600	
November 12	Bucknell	Taylor Stadium; Bethlehem, PA	L 0–45	5,000	
November 19	at Lafayette	Fisher Field; Easton, PA (The Rivalry)	L 0–16	14,000	
*Non-conference game; ^{†}Homecoming; Rankings from UPI Poll released prior to the game
