= 1966 Hofstra Flying Dutchmen football team =

American college football season

1966 Hofstra Flying Dutchmen football
- Conference: Middle Atlantic Conference
- University Division
- Record: 2–8 (1–3 MAC)
- Head coach: Howdy Myers (17th season)
- Captains: Mike D'Amato; Frank Marcinowski
- Home stadium: Hofstra Stadium

1966 Middle Atlantic Conference football standings
	Conf.					Overall
Team	W		L		T	W		L		T
University Division
Delaware x	6	–	0	–	0	6	–	3	–	0
Gettysburg	4	–	2	–	0	7	–	2	–	0
Temple	2	–	2	–	0	6	–	3	–	0
Lafayette	2	–	3	–	0	3	–	6	–	0
Bucknell	2	–	3	–	0	4	–	5	–	0
Hofstra	1	–	3	–	0	2	–	8	–	0
Lehigh	0	–	4	–	0	0	–	9	–	0
Northern College Division
Wilkes x	7	–	0	–	0	8	–	0	–	0
Upsala	6	–	1	–	0	6	–	2	–	0
Delaware Valley	4	–	2	–	0	5	–	3	–	0
Lycoming	4	–	3	–	0	4	–	4	–	0
Moravian	4	–	4	–	1	4	–	4	–	1
Albright	4	–	4	–	0	4	–	5	–	0
Juniata	3	–	3	–	0	4	–	4	–	0
Wagner	1	–	3	–	1	2	–	6	–	1
Susquehanna *	1	–	2	–	0	3	–	6	–	0
Southern College Division
Swarthmore x	6	–	0	–	1	6	–	0	–	1
Drexel	4	–	1	–	0	6	–	1	–	1
Franklin & Marshall	3	–	2	–	2	3	–	3	–	2
Dickinson	4	–	3	–	1	4	–	3	–	1
Western Maryland	2	–	3	–	0	4	–	5	–	0
Ursinus	2	–	4	–	1	2	–	5	–	1
Muhlenberg	2	–	6	–	1	2	–	6	–	1
Lebanon Valley	2	–	6	–	0	2	–	6	–	0
Pennsylvania Military	2	–	6	–	0	2	–	7	–	0
Haverford	1	–	5	–	0	1	–	6	–	0
Johns Hopkins	0	–	4	–	2	0	–	6	–	2
West Chester *	0	–	0	–	0	8	–	1	–	0
x – Division champion/co-champions; * – Ineligible for championship due to insufficient conference games

The 1966 Hofstra Flying Dutchmen football team was an American football team that represented Hofstra University during the 1966 NCAA College Division football season. Hofstra finished second-to-last in the Middle Atlantic Conference, University Division.

In their 17th year under head coach Howard "Howdy" Myers Jr., the Flying Dutchmen compiled a 2–8 record, and were outscored 175 to 133. Mike D'Amato and Frank Marcinowski were the team captains. Hofstra's 1–3 record against MAC University Division opponents earned sixth place in the seven-team division.

The Flying Dutchmen played their home games at Hofstra Stadium on the university's Hempstead campus on Long Island, New York.

== Schedule ==
Date	Opponent	Site	Result	Attendance	Source
September 17	at Gettysburg	Memorial Field; Gettysburg, PA	L 16–17	2,500	
September 24	at Delaware	Delaware Stadium; Newark, DE	L 13–35	10,140	
October 1	at Lafayette	Fisher Field; Easton, PA	W 9–6	1,500	
October 8	Otterbein*	Hofstra Stadium; Hempstead, NY	W 35–0	2,200–3,000	
October 15	No. 16 Temple	Hofstra Stadium; Hempstead, NY	L 7–18	5,500	
October 22	at Bridgeport*	John F. Kennedy Stadium; Bridgeport, CT	L 7–21	6,500	
October 29	Southern Connecticut*	Hofstra Stadium; Hempstead, NY	L 0–10	2,200–3,200	
November 5	Merchant Marine*	Hofstra Stadium; Hempstead, NY	L 6–16	4,000	
November 12	No. 13 Muskingum*	Hofstra Stadium; Hempstead, NY	L 19–27	1,400	
November 24	at C.W. Post*	Post Bowl; Brookville, NY	L 21–25	5,123	
*Non-conference game; Rankings from UPI Poll released prior to the game
