= John Toner (American football) =

American football player, coach, and administrator (1923–2014)

Biographical details
- Born: May 4, 1923; Nantucket, Massachusetts, U.S.
- Died: September 23, 2014 (aged 91); Savannah, Georgia, U.S.

Playing career
- 1947–1948: Boston University
- Position: Quarterback

Coaching career (HC unless noted)
- early 1950s: Boston University (assistant)
- 1954–1956: New Britain HS (CT)
- 1957–1965: Columbia (backfield)
- 1966–1970: Connecticut

Administrative career (AD unless noted)
- 1969–1987: Connecticut
- 1983–1985: NCAA (president)

Head coaching record
- Overall: 20–24–3 (college)

Accomplishments and honors

Championships
- 2 Yankee (1968, 1970)

Awards
- NFF Distinguished American Award (1986)

John L. Toner (May 4, 1923 – September 23, 2014) was an American football player, coach, and college athletics administrator. He served as the head football coach at the University of Connecticut (UConn) from 1966 to 1970 and as the school's athletic director from 1969 to 1987. During his 18-year tenure as athletic director Toner also served in several roles with the National Collegiate Athletic Association (NCAA), including as its president from 1983 to 1985. Toner was responsible for several momentous decisions in his time as athletic director at UConn, including UConn becoming a founding member of the Big East Conference in 1979, as well as the hiring of future Hall of Fame coaches Geno Auriemma and Jim Calhoun. He also oversaw the funding and construction of Gampel Pavilion.

== Personal life ==
Toner was born in 1923 in Nantucket, Massachusetts. He died at the age of 91 in 2014.

== Football coach ==
Toner became UConn's 21st head football coach in 1966. after having been the head football coach at New Britain High School in New Britain, CT. In five seasons under Toner the Huskies compiled a 20–24–3 record. Toner resigned as football coach at the end of the 1970 season to concentrate on his position as athletic director.

== Athletic director ==
Toner became UConn's athletic director in 1969, continuing a tradition of elevating someone from the football program to that position. He served in that position for 17 years until he resigned in 1987 except to oversee the construction of Gampel Pavilion.

=== Joining the Big East Conference ===
Toner was first approached about Connecticut becoming a founding member of the Big East Conference in May 1979, but was uncertain. On May 26, UConn was given a 24-hour deadline to decide whether they would join. Toner, unable to reach the university president, unilaterally accepted the invitation.

== NCAA ==
Toner served as president of the NCAA from 1983 to 1985. During his tenure, he was involved in implementing Title IX in collegiate athletics, splitting college football into Divisions I-A and I-AA, and passing new freshman eligibility rules. He also was involved in Herschel Walker's leaving college early to join the United States Football League.

== Honors and awards ==
- In 1997, the National Football Foundation inaugurated its John L. Toner Award, with Toner as the first recipient.
- On February 28, 2009, Toner was inducted as the 29th member of the UConn Huskies of Honor.

== Head coaching record ==
=== College ===
| Year | Team | Overall | Conference | Standing | Bowl/playoffs |
|---|---|---|---|---|---|
Connecticut Huskies (Yankee Conference) (1966–1970)
| 1966 | Connecticut | 2–6–1 | 2–2–1 | 3rd | |
| 1967 | Connecticut | 5–4 | 4–1 | 2nd | |
| 1968 | Connecticut | 4–6 | 4–1 | T–1st | |
| 1969 | Connecticut | 5–4 | 3–2 | T–2nd | |
| 1970 | Connecticut | 4–4–2 | 4–0–1 | 1st | |
| Connecticut: | | 20–24–3 | 13–8–1 | | |
| Total: | | 20–24–3 | | | |
National championship Conference title Conference division title or championship game berth
