= 1966 Xavier Musketeers football team =

American college football season

1966 Xavier Musketeers football
- Conference: Independent
- Record: 4–6
- Head coach: Ed Biles (5th season)
- Home stadium: Xavier Stadium

1966 NCAA University Division independents football records
	Conf.					Overall
Team	W		L		T	W		L		T
No. 1 Notre Dame		–		–		9	–	0	–	1
Colgate		–		–		8	–	1	–	1
No. 8 Georgia Tech		–		–		9	–	2	–	0
Army		–		–		8	–	2	–	0
Dayton		–		–		8	–	2	–	0
Houston		–		–		8	–	2	–	0
Memphis State		–		–		7	–	2	–	0
No. 9 Miami (FL)		–		–		8	–	2	–	1
Virginia Tech		–		–		8	–	2	–	1
Syracuse		–		–		8	–	3	–	0
Colorado State		–		–		7	–	3	–	0
New Mexico State		–		–		7	–	3	–	0
West Texas State		–		–		7	–	3	–	0
Villanova		–		–		6	–	3	–	0
Holy Cross		–		–		6	–	3	–	1
Southern Miss		–		–		6	–	4	–	0
Texas Western		–		–		6	–	4	–	0
Tulane		–		–		5	–	4	–	1
Florida State		–		–		6	–	5	–	0
Buffalo		–		–		5	–	5	–	0
Penn State		–		–		5	–	5	–	0
Air Force		–		–		4	–	6	–	0
Boston College		–		–		4	–	6	–	0
Navy		–		–		4	–	6	–	0
Utah State		–		–		4	–	6	–	0
Xavier		–		–		4	–	6	–	0
Pacific (CA)		–		–		4	–	7	–	0
San Jose State		–		–		3	–	7	–	0
Pittsburgh		–		–		1	–	9	–	0
Rankings from AP Poll

The 1966 Xavier Musketeers football team was an American football team that represented Xavier University as an independent during the 1966 NCAA University Division football season. In their fifth year under head coach Ed Biles, the Musketeers compiled a 4–6 record.

== Schedule ==
Date	Opponent	Site	Result	Attendance	Source
September 17	at Toledo	Glass Bowl; Toledo, OH	L 0–9	17,252	
September 24	Miami (OH)	Xavier Stadium; Cincinnati, OH	L 3–27	14,610	
October 1	Quantico Marines	Xavier Stadium; Cincinnati, OH	W 14–3	9,381	
October 8	at Cincinnati	Nippert Stadium; Cincinnati, OH (rivalry)	W 25–13	22,500	
October 15	at Ohio	Peden Stadium; Athens, OH	L 10–24	9,449	
October 22	No. 4 Chattanooga	Xavier Stadium; Cincinnati, OH	W 27–10	9,316–10,316	
October 29	at Villanova	Villanova Stadium; Villanova, PA	L 7–13	10,011	
November 5	at Dayton	Baujan Field; Dayton, OH	L 2–9	10,300	
November 12	Western Michigan	Xavier Stadium; Cincinnati, OH	W 21–6	8,412	
November 19	at Kent State	Memorial Stadium; Kent, OH	L 14–42	4,283	
Rankings from AP Poll released prior to the game
