= 1966 Yale Bulldogs football team =

American college football season

1966 Yale Bulldogs football
- Conference: Ivy League
- Record: 4–5 (3–4 Ivy)
- Head coach: Carmen Cozza (2nd season)
- Home stadium: Yale Bowl

1966 Ivy League football standings
	Conf.					Overall
Team	W		L		T	W		L		T
Dartmouth +	6	–	1	–	0	7	–	2	–	0
Harvard +	6	–	1	–	0	8	–	1	–	0
Princeton +	6	–	1	–	0	7	–	2	–	0
Cornell	4	–	3	–	0	6	–	3	–	0
Yale	3	–	4	–	0	4	–	5	–	0
Columbia	2	–	5	–	0	2	–	7	–	0
Penn	1	–	6	–	0	2	–	7	–	0
Brown	0	–	7	–	0	1	–	8	–	0
+ – Conference co-champions

The 1966 Yale Bulldogs football team represented Yale University in the 1966 NCAA University Division football season. The Bulldogs were led by second-year head coach Carmen Cozza, played their home games at the Yale Bowl and finished fifth in the Ivy League season with a 3–4 record, 4–5 overall.

== Schedule ==
Date	Opponent	Site	Result	Attendance	Source
September 24	Connecticut*	Yale Bowl; New Haven, CT	W 16–0	30,608	
October 1	Rutgers*	Yale Bowl; New Haven, CT	L 14–17	16,764	
October 8	Brown	Yale Bowl; New Haven, CT	W 24–0	29,777	
October 15	Columbia	Yale Bowl; New Haven, CT	W 44–21	29,226	
October 22	at Cornell	Schoellkopf Field; Ithaca, NY	L 14–16	20,000	
October 29	Dartmouth	Yale Bowl; New Haven, CT	L 13–28	54,360	
November 5	at Penn	Franklin Field; Philadelphia, PA	W 17–14	13,638	
November 12	Princeton	Yale Bowl; New Haven, CT (rivalry)	L 7–13	38,100	
November 19	at Harvard	Harvard Stadium; Boston, MA (The Game)	L 0–17	41,000	
*Non-conference game

== NFL draft ==
The following Bulldog was selected in the National Football League draft following the season.

Round	Pick	Player	Position	NFL team
4	84	Bob Greenlee	OT	Miami Dolphins
