= 1966 West Texas State Buffaloes football team =

American college football season

1966 West Texas State Buffaloes football
- Conference: Independent
- Record: 7–3
- Head coach: Joe Kerbel (7th season)
- Home stadium: Buffalo Bowl

1966 NCAA University Division independents football records
	Conf.					Overall
Team	W		L		T	W		L		T
No. 1 Notre Dame		–		–		9	–	0	–	1
Colgate		–		–		8	–	1	–	1
No. 8 Georgia Tech		–		–		9	–	2	–	0
Army		–		–		8	–	2	–	0
Dayton		–		–		8	–	2	–	0
Houston		–		–		8	–	2	–	0
Memphis State		–		–		7	–	2	–	0
No. 9 Miami (FL)		–		–		8	–	2	–	1
Virginia Tech		–		–		8	–	2	–	1
Syracuse		–		–		8	–	3	–	0
Colorado State		–		–		7	–	3	–	0
New Mexico State		–		–		7	–	3	–	0
West Texas State		–		–		7	–	3	–	0
Villanova		–		–		6	–	3	–	0
Holy Cross		–		–		6	–	3	–	1
Southern Miss		–		–		6	–	4	–	0
Texas Western		–		–		6	–	4	–	0
Tulane		–		–		5	–	4	–	1
Florida State		–		–		6	–	5	–	0
Buffalo		–		–		5	–	5	–	0
Penn State		–		–		5	–	5	–	0
Air Force		–		–		4	–	6	–	0
Boston College		–		–		4	–	6	–	0
Navy		–		–		4	–	6	–	0
Utah State		–		–		4	–	6	–	0
Xavier		–		–		4	–	6	–	0
Pacific (CA)		–		–		4	–	7	–	0
San Jose State		–		–		3	–	7	–	0
Pittsburgh		–		–		1	–	9	–	0
Rankings from AP Poll

The 1966 West Texas State Buffaloes football team represented West Texas State University (now known as West Texas A&M University) as an independent during the 1966 NCAA University Division football season. In their seventh season under head coach Joe Kerbel, the Buffaloes compiled an 7–3 record. West Texas State played home games at the Buffalo Bowl in Canyon, Texas.

== Schedule ==
Date	Opponent	Site	Result	Attendance	Source
September 17	Arlington State	Buffalo Bowl; Canyon, TX	W 38–6	13,000–15,000	
September 24	at Pacific (CA)	Pacific Memorial Stadium; Stockton, CA	W 49–7	16,033	
October 1	at Arizona State	Sun Devil Stadium; Tempe, AZ	W 21–20	29,882	
October 8	Texas Western	Buffalo Bowl; Canyon, TX	L 3–9	19,400	
October 15	Richmond	Buffalo Bowl; Canyon, TX	W 41–7	14,500	
October 22	New Mexico State	Buffalo Bowl; Canyon, TX	W 17–14	13,300	
October 29	Memphis State	Buffalo Bowl; Canyon, TX	L 14–26	12,500	
November 5	at Northern Arizona	Lumberjack Stadium; Flagstaff, AZ	W 34–7	6,900	
November 12	at Colorado State	Colorado Field; Fort Collins, CO	L 26–35	14,573	
November 19	Western Michigan	Buffalo Bowl; Canyon, TX	W 30–7	10,500	
