= 1966 Gettysburg Bullets football team =

American college football season

1966 Gettysburg Bullets football

Lambert Cup
- Conference: Middle Atlantic Conference
- University Division
- Record: 7–2 (4–2 MAC)
- Head coach: Eugene M. Haas (10th season)
- Captains: Rod Albright; Dick Shirk; Brian Tierney
- Home stadium: Memorial Field

1966 Middle Atlantic Conference football standings
	Conf.					Overall
Team	W		L		T	W		L		T
University Division
Delaware x	6	–	0	–	0	6	–	3	–	0
Gettysburg	4	–	2	–	0	7	–	2	–	0
Temple	2	–	2	–	0	6	–	3	–	0
Lafayette	2	–	3	–	0	3	–	6	–	0
Bucknell	2	–	3	–	0	4	–	5	–	0
Hofstra	1	–	3	–	0	2	–	8	–	0
Lehigh	0	–	4	–	0	0	–	9	–	0
Northern College Division
Wilkes x	7	–	0	–	0	8	–	0	–	0
Upsala	6	–	1	–	0	6	–	2	–	0
Delaware Valley	4	–	2	–	0	5	–	3	–	0
Lycoming	4	–	3	–	0	4	–	4	–	0
Moravian	4	–	4	–	1	4	–	4	–	1
Albright	4	–	4	–	0	4	–	5	–	0
Juniata	3	–	3	–	0	4	–	4	–	0
Wagner	1	–	3	–	1	2	–	6	–	1
Susquehanna *	1	–	2	–	0	3	–	6	–	0
Southern College Division
Swarthmore x	6	–	0	–	1	6	–	0	–	1
Drexel	4	–	1	–	0	6	–	1	–	1
Franklin & Marshall	3	–	2	–	2	3	–	3	–	2
Dickinson	4	–	3	–	1	4	–	3	–	1
Western Maryland	2	–	3	–	0	4	–	5	–	0
Ursinus	2	–	4	–	1	2	–	5	–	1
Muhlenberg	2	–	6	–	1	2	–	6	–	1
Lebanon Valley	2	–	6	–	0	2	–	6	–	0
Pennsylvania Military	2	–	6	–	0	2	–	7	–	0
Haverford	1	–	5	–	0	1	–	6	–	0
Johns Hopkins	0	–	4	–	2	0	–	6	–	2
West Chester *	0	–	0	–	0	8	–	1	–	0
x – Division champion/co-champions; * – Ineligible for championship due to insufficient conference games

The 1966 Gettysburg Bullets football team was an American football team that represented Gettysburg College during the 1966 NCAA College Division football season. The Bullets placed second in the University Division of the Middle Atlantic Conference (MAC), but were awarded the Lambert Cup as the best football team at a mid-sized college in the East. The team played its home games at Musselman Stadium in Gettysburg, Pennsylvania.

During its 10th year under head coach Eugene M. Haas, this team compiled a 7–2 record. Rod Albright, Dick Shirk and Brian Tierney were the team captains.

Gettysburg finished the year on a six-game win streak. After the second straight win, the Bullets entered the UPI small college poll at No. 18; two weeks later they rose to No. 17, and remained in that rank at the end of the year.

Both of Gettysburg's early-season losses were to divisional rivals, yielding a 4–2 MAC University Division record, good for only second place. Nonetheless, the Bullets leapfrogged Delaware – which had beaten them in the league standings and in their head-to-head matchup – in the Lambert Cup balloting. Gettysburg had not been the top choice of any of the selectors, but were mentioned among the top 10 on each of the 10 ballots. The surprise selection irked fans of Delaware, which had been named No. 1 on five of the ballots, but entirely omitted from two of them.

== Schedule ==
Date	Opponent	Rank	Site	Result	Attendance	Source
September 17	Hofstra		Musselman Stadium; Gettysburg, PA	W 17–16	2,500	
September 24	at Bucknell		Memorial Stadium; Lewisburg, PA	L 10–16	6,000	
October 1	No. 13 Delaware		Musselman Stadium; Gettysburg, PA	L 0–3	1,600–1,900	
October 8	at Albright*		Albright College Stadium; Reading, PA	W 34–7	7,500	
October 15	Lehigh^{†}		Musselman Stadium; Gettysburg, PA	W 31–13	5,800	
October 22	Merchant Marine*	No. 18	Tomb Field; Kings Point, NY	W 20–16	2,000	
October 29	at Lafayette	No. 18	Fisher Field; Easton, PA	W 19–18	9,000	
November 5	at Juniata*	No. 17	College Field; Huntingdon, PA	W 33–21	2,000	
November 12	at Temple	No. 17	Temple Stadium; Philadelphia, PA	W 21–19	6,200	
*Non-conference game; ^{†}Homecoming; Rankings from UPI Coaches Poll released prior to the game

== See also ==
- 1964 Gettysburg Bullets football team, Gettysburg's only championship team in 12 years of MAC University Division play
