= 1966 Temple Owls football team =

American college football season

1966 Temple Owls football
- Conference: Middle Atlantic Conference
- University Division
- Record: 6–3 (2–2 MAC)
- Head coach: George Makris (7th season)
- Home stadium: Temple Stadium

1966 Middle Atlantic Conference football standings
	Conf.					Overall
Team	W		L		T	W		L		T
University Division
Delaware x	6	–	0	–	0	6	–	3	–	0
Gettysburg	4	–	2	–	0	7	–	2	–	0
Temple	2	–	2	–	0	6	–	3	–	0
Lafayette	2	–	3	–	0	3	–	6	–	0
Bucknell	2	–	3	–	0	4	–	5	–	0
Hofstra	1	–	3	–	0	2	–	8	–	0
Lehigh	0	–	4	–	0	0	–	9	–	0
Northern College Division
Wilkes x	7	–	0	–	0	8	–	0	–	0
Upsala	6	–	1	–	0	6	–	2	–	0
Delaware Valley	4	–	2	–	0	5	–	3	–	0
Lycoming	4	–	3	–	0	4	–	4	–	0
Moravian	4	–	4	–	1	4	–	4	–	1
Albright	4	–	4	–	0	4	–	5	–	0
Juniata	3	–	3	–	0	4	–	4	–	0
Wagner	1	–	3	–	1	2	–	6	–	1
Susquehanna *	1	–	2	–	0	3	–	6	–	0
Southern College Division
Swarthmore x	6	–	0	–	1	6	–	0	–	1
Drexel	4	–	1	–	0	6	–	1	–	1
Franklin & Marshall	3	–	2	–	2	3	–	3	–	2
Dickinson	4	–	3	–	1	4	–	3	–	1
Western Maryland	2	–	3	–	0	4	–	5	–	0
Ursinus	2	–	4	–	1	2	–	5	–	1
Muhlenberg	2	–	6	–	1	2	–	6	–	1
Lebanon Valley	2	–	6	–	0	2	–	6	–	0
Pennsylvania Military	2	–	6	–	0	2	–	7	–	0
Haverford	1	–	5	–	0	1	–	6	–	0
Johns Hopkins	0	–	4	–	2	0	–	6	–	2
West Chester *	0	–	0	–	0	8	–	1	–	0
x – Division champion/co-champions; * – Ineligible for championship due to insufficient conference games

The 1966 Temple Owls football team was an American football team that represented Temple University as a member of the Middle Atlantic Conference (MAC) during the 1966 NCAA College Division football season. In its seventh season under head coach George Makris, the team compiled a 6–3 record (2–2 against MAC opponents) and finished third out of seven teams in the MAC's University Division. The team played its home games at Temple Stadium in Philadelphia.

== Schedule ==
Date	Opponent	Rank	Site	Result	Attendance	Source
September 24	at Merchant Marine*		Tomb Field; Kings Point, NY	W 48–8	8,500	
October 1	at Boston University*		Temple Stadium; Philadelphia, PA	W 9–6	2,000	
October 8	Bucknell		Temple Stadium; Philadelphia, PA	W 82–28	7,000	
October 15	at Hofstra	No. 16	Hofstra Stadium; Hempstead, NY	W 18–7	5,439–5,500	
October 22	Connecticut*	No. 12	Temple Stadium; Philadelphia, PA	W 35–25	9,500	
October 29	No. 13 Delaware	No. 12	Temple Stadium; Philadelphia, PA	L 14–20	13,000	
November 5	at Rhode Island*		Meade Stadium; Kingston, RI	W 21–19	4,000–5,500	
November 12	at No. 17 Gettysburg		Musselman Stadium; Gettysburg, PA	L 19–21	6,200	
November 19	Bowling Green*		Temple Stadium; Philadelphia, PA	L 20–62	6,500	
*Non-conference game; Rankings from UPI Poll released prior to the game
