= Joe Yukica =

American football player and coach (1931–2022)

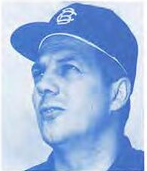
- Yukica in 1976

Biographical details
- Born: May 27, 1931; Aliquippa, Pennsylvania, U.S.
- Died: January 22, 2022 (aged 90); Hanover, New Hampshire, U.S.

Playing career
- 1949–1952: Penn State
- Position: Tight end

Coaching career (HC unless noted)
- 1953: Penn State (Fresh. Asst.)
- 1954: State College HS (PA)
- 1955–1959: Central Dauphin HS (PA)
- 1960: West Chester State (Ends)
- 1961–1965: Dartmouth (OL)
- 1966–1967: New Hampshire
- 1968–1977: Boston College
- 1978–1986: Dartmouth

Head coaching record
- Overall: 111–93–4 (college)

Accomplishments and honors

Championships
- 3 Ivy (1978, 1981-1982)

Joseph M. Yukica (May 27, 1931 – January 22, 2022) was an American college football player and coach. He served as the head football coach at the University of New Hampshire (1966–1967), Boston College (1968–1977), and Dartmouth College (1978–1986), compiling a career college football record of 111–93–4. Yukica played at Pennsylvania State University from 1949 to 1952.

== Early life ==
Yukica was the son of a Croatian immigrant crane operator and a farmer's daughter. He was born in Aliquippa, Pennsylvania and grew up in Midland, Pennsylvania. He didn't play football until his senior year at Midland High School, but played well enough to represent Beaver County in a high school all-star game, where he attracted the attention of a Penn State assistant. He played tight end under Rip Engle from 1949 to 1952 and was one of the top college receivers in the east. During his summer breaks, Yukica returned home and worked in the Crucible Specialty Steel plant's maintenance department.

== Coaching career ==
=== Early years ===
In 1953 Yukica helped coach Penn State's freshman football team. In 1954 he became the head coach at State College Area High School. He then moved to Central Dauphin High School, where he won Pennsylvania High School Coach of the Year after an undefeated 1958 season. In 1960 he was the ends coach at West Chester State. He then served five seasons as an assistant under Bob Blackman at Dartmouth.

=== New Hampshire ===
Yukica became the head coach at the University of New Hampshire in 1966. As the Wildcats' coach, Yukica's playbook contained 450 offensive plays and 89 defensive plays, much more than most professional teams of the time. In 1967, the Wildcats went 5-3 and Yukica was named New England coach of the year for his success in turning around the UNH football program.

=== Boston College ===
On December 22, 1967, Yukica signed a three-year contract to become the head football coach at Boston College. He succeed Jim Miller, who had resigned due to alumni protests following a 4–6 season. Yukica, who had not applied for the job, was BC's top choice from a pool of 100 candidates. Upon taking the job, Yukica expanded the coaching staff to six-full time assistants, as he felt the sport was becoming more specialized and he needed “the right help to get the job done”. He brought along Bill Bowes, Pete Carmichael, and Joe Daniels from New Hampshire and hired Bill Campbell, John Anderson, and Jack Bicknell to fill out the coaching staff. Yukica also sought to expand BC's recruiting nationwide and committed to recruiting African-American players. Prior to his arrival, the school had only had five black football players in its history.

In his Yukica's 10 years as head coach, Boston College had a 68–37 record and only one losing season. This included a 18–14 record against the "Eastern Big Five" schools (Army, Navy, Pittsburgh, Syracuse, and Penn State), a vast improvement over the 1–19 record BC had in the decade prior to Yukica’s arrival. The school also began taking on bigger competition, dropping Maine, William & Mary, Richmond, Detroit, and Buffalo from the schedule and in favor of Notre Dame, Texas, Tennessee, Texas A&M, Georgia Tech, and Texas Tech. In 1976, Boston College upset the Earl Campbell-led Texas Longhorns 14–13. His 68 wins remained the school record until 2006 when he was passed by Tom O'Brien.

After the 1970 season Yukica was offered the head coaching job at Dartmouth. He came "as close as you can get" to taking the job, but decided to remain at Boston College, as he felt coaching the up-and-coming Eagles was more of a challenge than taking over the Ivy League champion. The following year he interviewed for the University of Maryland job, but withdrew from consideration before his second interview.

Despite his success, BC was unable to reach a bowl game under Yukica, which led to pressure from the school's alumni. In 1977, the Eagles went 6–5, which included a 44–0 blowout loss to Texas and a 35–21 upset to rival Holy Cross.

=== Dartmouth ===
The Dartmouth job opened up again in 1978 and this time Yukica took it. Dartmouth won the Ivy League championship in 1978 and shares of the championship in 1981 and 1982. The team then backslid, going 8–19–2 over the next three seasons. Yukica was asked by athletic director Ted Leland to resign after a 2–7–1 1985 season. He refused and on November 29, 1985, Yukica was removed as head coach and reassigned to another position in the athletic department for the remainder of his contract, which was to expire on June 30, 1987. Yukica, represented by attorney Michael Slive, filed suit seeking to have his dismissal declared illegal and be allowed to complete his contract. Dartmouth, represented by Thomas D. Rath, contended that the school had the right to change the terms of Yukica's contract as long it fulfilled the financial terms. During the trial, fellow coaches Joe Paterno, Jack Bicknell, and Bob Blackman testified on Yukica's behalf. On December 13, 1985, Judge Walter L. Murphy – a former college football coach ruled in favor of Yukica. Dartmouth had the right to appeal, but the two sides reached an out-of-court settlement that allowed Yukica to coach the 1986 season, after which he would leave the school. Although the case was not resolved at trial, Yukica v. Leland has been hailed by the American Football Coaches Association and others as setting an important precedent in sports law. The case also affected how coaching contracts were written, particularly at the college level. In his final season as head coach, Yukica's team compiled a 3–6–1 record. He was replaced by his former quarterback Buddy Teevens.

== Later life and death ==
After leaving Dartmouth, Yukica remained in New Hampshire, residing in Grantham and selling real estate with his wife. Yukica died on January 22, 2022, at the age of 90.

== Head coaching record ==
Year	Team	Overall	Conference	Standing	Bowl/playoffs
New Hampshire Wildcats (Yankee Conference) (1966–1967)
1966	New Hampshire	2–6	1–4	6th	
1967	New Hampshire	5–3	2–3	4th	
New Hampshire:		7–9	5–7		
Boston College Eagles (NCAA University Division / Division I independent) (1968–1977)
1968	Boston College	6–3			
1969	Boston College	5–4			
1970	Boston College	8–2			
1971	Boston College	9–2			
1972	Boston College	4–7			
1973	Boston College	7–4			
1974	Boston College	8–3			
1975	Boston College	7–4			
1976	Boston College	8–3			
1977	Boston College	6–5			
Boston College:		68–37			
Dartmouth Big Green (Ivy League) (1978–1986)
1978	Dartmouth	6–3	6–1	1st	
1979	Dartmouth	4–4–1	4–3	T–4th	
1980	Dartmouth	4–6	4–3	T–3rd	
1981	Dartmouth	6–4	6–1	T–1st	
1982	Dartmouth	5–5	5–2	T–1st	
1983	Dartmouth	4–5–1	4–2–1	T–3rd	
1984	Dartmouth	2–7	2–5	T–6th	
1985	Dartmouth	2–7–1	2–4–1	6th	
1986	Dartmouth	3–6–1	3–3–1	4th	
Dartmouth:		36–47–4	36–24–3		
Total:		111–93–4			
National championship Conference title Conference division title or championship game berth
