= 1966 Delaware Fightin' Blue Hens football team =

American college football season

1966 Delaware Fightin' Blue Hens football

MAC University Division champion
- Conference: Middle Atlantic Conference
- University Division
- Record: 6–3 (6–0 MAC)
- Head coach: Tubby Raymond (1st season)
- Offensive scheme: Delaware Wing-T
- Base defense: 5–2
- Captain: Ed Sand
- Home stadium: Delaware Stadium

1966 Middle Atlantic Conference football standings
	Conf.					Overall
Team	W		L		T	W		L		T
University Division
Delaware x	6	–	0	–	0	6	–	3	–	0
Gettysburg	4	–	2	–	0	7	–	2	–	0
Temple	2	–	2	–	0	6	–	3	–	0
Lafayette	2	–	3	–	0	3	–	6	–	0
Bucknell	2	–	3	–	0	4	–	5	–	0
Hofstra	1	–	3	–	0	2	–	8	–	0
Lehigh	0	–	4	–	0	0	–	9	–	0
Northern College Division
Wilkes x	7	–	0	–	0	8	–	0	–	0
Upsala	6	–	1	–	0	6	–	2	–	0
Delaware Valley	4	–	2	–	0	5	–	3	–	0
Lycoming	4	–	3	–	0	4	–	4	–	0
Moravian	4	–	4	–	1	4	–	4	–	1
Albright	4	–	4	–	0	4	–	5	–	0
Juniata	3	–	3	–	0	4	–	4	–	0
Wagner	1	–	3	–	1	2	–	6	–	1
Susquehanna *	1	–	2	–	0	3	–	6	–	0
Southern College Division
Swarthmore x	6	–	0	–	1	6	–	0	–	1
Drexel	4	–	1	–	0	6	–	1	–	1
Franklin & Marshall	3	–	2	–	2	3	–	3	–	2
Dickinson	4	–	3	–	1	4	–	3	–	1
Western Maryland	2	–	3	–	0	4	–	5	–	0
Ursinus	2	–	4	–	1	2	–	5	–	1
Muhlenberg	2	–	6	–	1	2	–	6	–	1
Lebanon Valley	2	–	6	–	0	2	–	6	–	0
Pennsylvania Military	2	–	6	–	0	2	–	7	–	0
Haverford	1	–	5	–	0	1	–	6	–	0
Johns Hopkins	0	–	4	–	2	0	–	6	–	2
West Chester *	0	–	0	–	0	8	–	1	–	0
x – Division champion/co-champions; * – Ineligible for championship due to insufficient conference games

The 1966 Delaware Fightin' Blue Hens football team was an American football team that represented the University of Delaware during the 1966 NCAA College Division football season. Delaware won the championship of the Middle Atlantic Conference, University Division.

In its first season under head coach Tubby Raymond, the team finished with a 6–3 record (6–0 against MAC University opponents) and outscored opponents by a total of 201 to 156. Ed Sand was the team captain.

Despite sweeping their divisional opponents – Delaware's only losses were against "major college" programs – the Blue Hens did not receive the Lambert Cup, signifying the best football team from a mid-sized college in the East. Instead, the award went to Gettysburg, a team that Delaware had beaten both on the field and in the MAC University Division standings. Gettysburg had not been the top choice of any of the selectors, but were mentioned among the top 10 on each of the 10 ballots, whereas Delaware had been named No. 1 on five of the ballots, but was entirely omitted from two of them.

The team played its home games at Delaware Stadium in Newark, Delaware.

== Schedule ==
Date	Opponent	Rank	Site	Result	Attendance	Source
September 24	Hofstra		Delaware Stadium; Newark, DE	W 35–13	10,140	
October 1	at Gettysburg	No. 13	Musselman Stadium; Gettysburg, PA	W 3–0	1,600–1,900	
October 8	Lafayette	No. 11	Delaware Stadium; Newark, DE	W 23–15	10,000–10,024	
October 15	at Villanova*	No. 10	Villanova Stadium; Villanova, PA (rivalry)	L 14–16	11,975	
October 22	Lehigh	No. 14	Delaware Stadium; Newark, DE (rivalry)	W 41–0	13,132	
October 29	at No. 12 Temple	No. 13	Temple Stadium; Philadelphia, PA	W 20–14	13,000	
November 5	at Buffalo*	No. 6	Rotary Field; Buffalo, NY	L 6–36	5,434	
November 12	at Boston University	No. 14	Nickerson Field; Boston, MA	L 14–42	5,000	
November 19	Bucknell		Delaware Stadium; Newark, DE	W 45–20	10,099	
*Non-conference game; Rankings from UPI Coaches Poll released prior to the game
