= 1966 Rhode Island Rams football team =

American college football season

1966 Rhode Island Rams football
- Conference: Yankee Conference
- Record: 1–7–1 (1–3–1 Yankee)
- Head coach: Jack Zilly (4th season)
- Home stadium: Meade Stadium

1966 Yankee Conference football standings
	Conf.					Overall
Team	W		L		T	W		L		T
UMass $	5	–	0	–	0	6	–	3	–	0
Vermont	3	–	2	–	0	6	–	2	–	0
Connecticut	2	–	2	–	1	2	–	6	–	1
Maine	2	–	3	–	0	4	–	5	–	0
Rhode Island	1	–	3	–	1	1	–	7	–	1
New Hampshire	1	–	4	–	0	2	–	6	–	0
$ – Conference champion

The 1966 Rhode Island Rams football team was an American football team that represented the University of Rhode Island as a member of the Yankee Conference during the 1966 NCAA College Division football season. In its fourth season under head coach Jack Zilly, the team compiled a 1–7–1 record (1–3–1 against conference opponents), finished in fifth place out of six teams in the Yankee Conference, and was outscored by a total of 186 to 93. The team played its home games at Meade Stadium in Kingston, Rhode Island.

== Schedule ==
Date	Opponent	Site	Result	Attendance	Source
September 24	at Brown*	Brown Stadium; Providence, RI (rivalry)	L 14–40	13,300–13,600	
October 1	at New Hampshire	Cowell Stadium; Durham, NH	W 17–6	2,500–5,000	
October 8	Vermont	Meade Stadium; Kingston, RI	L 7–21	11,331–11,600	
October 15	UMass	Meade Stadium; Kingston, RI	L 9–14	5,100–5,630	
October 22	at Maine	Alumni Field; Orono, ME	L 6–21	8,900	
October 29	at Bucknell*	Memorial Stadium; Lewisburg, PA	L 7–33	6,243–7,000	
November 5	Temple*	Meade Stadium; Kingston, RI	L 19–21	4,000–5,500	
November 12	at Connecticut	Memorial Stadium; Storrs, CT (rivalry)	T 0–0	9,000	
November 19	Boston University*	Meade Stadium; Kingston, RI	L 14–30	5,280	
*Non-conference game
