= 1966 Princeton Tigers football team =

American college football season

1966 Princeton Tigers football

Ivy League co-champion
- Conference: Ivy League
- Record: 7–2 (6–1 Ivy)
- Head coach: Dick Colman (10th season)
- Captain: Walter J. Kozumbo
- Home stadium: Palmer Stadium

1966 Ivy League football standings
	Conf.					Overall
Team	W		L		T	W		L		T
Dartmouth +	6	–	1	–	0	7	–	2	–	0
Harvard +	6	–	1	–	0	8	–	1	–	0
Princeton +	6	–	1	–	0	7	–	2	–	0
Cornell	4	–	3	–	0	6	–	3	–	0
Yale	3	–	4	–	0	4	–	5	–	0
Columbia	2	–	5	–	0	2	–	7	–	0
Penn	1	–	6	–	0	2	–	7	–	0
Brown	0	–	7	–	0	1	–	8	–	0
+ – Conference co-champions

The 1966 Princeton Tigers football team was an American football team that represented Princeton University during the 1966 NCAA University Division football season. Princeton shared the championship of the Ivy League in a three-way tie.

In their tenth year under head coach Dick Colman, the Tigers compiled a 7–2 record and outscored opponents 135 to 103. Walter J. Kozumbo was the team captain.

Princeton's 6–1 conference record earned a three-way tie for first place in the Ivy League standings. The Tigers outscored Ivy opponents 119 to 84. Princeton defeated one of its co-champions, Harvard, while suffering its only in-conference loss to the other co-champion, Dartmouth.

Princeton played its home games at Palmer Stadium on the university campus in Princeton, New Jersey.

== Schedule ==
Date	Opponent	Site	Result	Attendance	Source
September 24	Rutgers*	Palmer Stadium; Princeton, NJ (rivalry)	W 16–12	33,000	
October 1	Columbia	Palmer Stadium; Princeton, NJ	W 14–12	2,000	
October 8	at Dartmouth	Memorial Field; Hanover, NH	L 13–31	15,948	
October 15	Colgate*	Palmer Stadium; Princeton, NJ	L 0–7	34,000	
October 22	at Penn	Franklin Field; Philadelphia, PA (rivalry)	W 30–13	20,844	
October 29	at Brown	Brown Stadium; Providence, RI	W 24–7	11,700	
November 5	Harvard	Palmer Stadium; Princeton, NJ (rivalry)	W 18–14	35,000	
November 12	at Yale	Yale Bowl; New Haven, CT (rivalry)	W 13–7	38,100	
November 19	Cornell	Palmer Stadium; Princeton, NJ	W 7–0	28,000	
*Non-conference game
