= 1966 Ohio Bobcats football team =

American college football season

1966 Ohio Bobcats football
- Conference: Mid-American Conference
- Record: 5–5 (3–3 MAC)
- Head coach: Bill Hess (9th season)
- Home stadium: Peden Stadium

1966 Mid-American Conference football standings
	Conf.					Overall
Team	W		L		T	W		L		T
Miami (OH) +	5	–	1	–	0	9	–	1	–	0
Western Michigan +	5	–	1	–	0	7	–	3	–	0
Bowling Green	4	–	2	–	0	6	–	3	–	0
Ohio	3	–	3	–	0	5	–	5	–	0
Kent State	2	–	4	–	0	4	–	6	–	0
Toledo	1	–	5	–	0	2	–	7	–	1
Marshall	1	–	5	–	0	2	–	8	–	0
+ – Conference co-champions

The 1966 Ohio Bobcats football team was an American football team that represented Ohio University in the Mid-American Conference (MAC) during the 1966 NCAA University Division football season. In their ninth season under head coach Bill Hess, the Bobcats compiled a 5–5 record (3–3 against MAC opponents), finished in fourth place in the MAC, and were outscored by all opponents by a combined total of 183 to 149. They played their home games in Peden Stadium in Athens, Ohio.

The team's statistical leaders included Bob Houmard with 641 rushing yards, Ron Delucca with 655 passing yards, and Jay Maupin with 447 receiving yards.

== Schedule ==
Date	Opponent	Site	Result	Attendance	Source
September 17	at No. 8 Purdue*	Ross–Ade Stadium; West Lafayette, IN	L 3–42	47,172	
September 24	at Boston College*	Alumni Stadium; Chestnut Hill, MA	W 23–14	19,200	
October 1	at Kent State	Memorial Stadium; Kent, OH	W 12–10	16,500	
October 8	Toledo	Peden Stadium; Athens, OH	W 21–6	17,100	
October 15	Xavier*	Peden Stadium; Athens, OH	W 24–10	9,449	
October 22	Miami (OH)	Peden Stadium; Athens, OH (rivalry)	L 13–33	20,200	
October 29	Dayton*^{†}	Peden Stadium; Athens, OH	L 12–20	19,182	
November 5	at Western Michigan	Waldo Stadium; Kalamazoo, MI	L 13–20	17,000	
November 12	at Bowling Green	Doyt Perry Stadium; Bowling Green, OH	L 0–28	15,068	
November 19	Marshall	Peden Stadium; Athens, OH (rivalry)	W 28–0		
*Non-conference game; ^{†}Homecoming; Rankings from AP Poll released prior to the game
