= 1966 Lafayette Leopards football team =

American college football season

1966 Lafayette Leopards football
- Conference: Middle Atlantic Conference
- University Division
- Record: 3–6 (2–3 MAC)
- Head coach: Kenneth Bunn (4th season)
- Captain: Gary Marshall
- Home stadium: Fisher Field

1966 Middle Atlantic Conference football standings
	Conf.					Overall
Team	W		L		T	W		L		T
University Division
Delaware x	6	–	0	–	0	6	–	3	–	0
Gettysburg	4	–	2	–	0	7	–	2	–	0
Temple	2	–	2	–	0	6	–	3	–	0
Lafayette	2	–	3	–	0	3	–	6	–	0
Bucknell	2	–	3	–	0	4	–	5	–	0
Hofstra	1	–	3	–	0	2	–	8	–	0
Lehigh	0	–	4	–	0	0	–	9	–	0
Northern College Division
Wilkes x	7	–	0	–	0	8	–	0	–	0
Upsala	6	–	1	–	0	6	–	2	–	0
Delaware Valley	4	–	2	–	0	5	–	3	–	0
Lycoming	4	–	3	–	0	4	–	4	–	0
Moravian	4	–	4	–	1	4	–	4	–	1
Albright	4	–	4	–	0	4	–	5	–	0
Juniata	3	–	3	–	0	4	–	4	–	0
Wagner	1	–	3	–	1	2	–	6	–	1
Susquehanna *	1	–	2	–	0	3	–	6	–	0
Southern College Division
Swarthmore x	6	–	0	–	1	6	–	0	–	1
Drexel	4	–	1	–	0	6	–	1	–	1
Franklin & Marshall	3	–	2	–	2	3	–	3	–	2
Dickinson	4	–	3	–	1	4	–	3	–	1
Western Maryland	2	–	3	–	0	4	–	5	–	0
Ursinus	2	–	4	–	1	2	–	5	–	1
Muhlenberg	2	–	6	–	1	2	–	6	–	1
Lebanon Valley	2	–	6	–	0	2	–	6	–	0
Pennsylvania Military	2	–	6	–	0	2	–	7	–	0
Haverford	1	–	5	–	0	1	–	6	–	0
Johns Hopkins	0	–	4	–	2	0	–	6	–	2
West Chester *	0	–	0	–	0	8	–	1	–	0
x – Division champion/co-champions; * – Ineligible for championship due to insufficient conference games

The 1966 Lafayette Leopards football team was an American football team that represented Lafayette College during the 1966 NCAA College Division football season. Lafayette tied for fourth in the Middle Atlantic Conference, University Division, and placed second in the Middle Three Conference.

In their fourth and final year under head coach Kenneth Bunn, the Leopards compiled a 3–6 record. Gary Marshall was the team captain.

At 2–3 against MAC University Division foes, Lafayette tied Bucknell for fourth place in the seven-team circuit. Lafayette went 1–1 against the Middle Three, losing to Rutgers and beating Lehigh.

Lafayette played its home games at Fisher Field on College Hill in Easton, Pennsylvania.

== Schedule ==
Date	Opponent	Site	Result	Attendance	Source
September 24	at Harvard*	Harvard Stadium; Boston, MA	L 7–30	13,000	
October 1	Hofstra	Fisher Field; Easton, PA	L 6–9	1,500	
October 8	at No. 11 Delaware	Delaware Stadium; Newark, DE	L 15–23	10,000–10,024	
October 15	at Tufts*	Ellis Oval; Somerville, MA	W 40–0	5,500	
October 22	at Bucknell	Memorial Stadium; Lewisburg, PA	W 25–7	8,372	
October 29	No. 18 Gettysburg	Fisher Field; Easton, PA	L 18–19	9,000	
November 5	at Rutgers	Rutgers Stadium; Piscataway, NJ	L 28–32	10,500	
November 12	Colgate*	Fisher Field; Easton, PA	L 9–20	5,000	
November 19	Lehigh	Fisher Field; Easton, PA (The Rivalry)	W 16–0	14,000	
*Non-conference game; Rankings from UPI Poll released prior to the game
