= 1966 Rutgers Scarlet Knights football team =

American college football season

1966 Rutgers Scarlet Knights football

Middle Three champion
- Conference: Middle Three Conference
- Record: 5–4 (2–0 Middle Three)
- Head coach: John F. Bateman (7th season)
- Captains: Jack Emmer; Robert Schroeder
- Home stadium: Rutgers Stadium

1966 Middle Three Conference football standings
	Conf.					Overall
Team	W		L		T	W		L		T
Rutgers $	2	–	0	–	0	5	–	4	–	0
Lafayette	1	–	1	–	0	3	–	6	–	0
Lehigh	0	–	2	–	0	0	–	9	–	0
$ – Conference champion

The 1966 Rutgers Scarlet Knights football team represented Rutgers University in the 1966 NCAA University Division football season. In their seventh season under head coach John F. Bateman, the Scarlet Knights compiled a 5–4 record, won the Middle Three Conference championship, and outscored their opponents 184 to 177. The team's statistical leaders included Fred Eckert with 756 passing yards, Bryant Mitchell with 540 rushing yards, and Jack Emmer with 701 receiving yards. Co-captain, senior Bob Schroeder, was a rarity as the Scarlet Knights' "ironman" starting on offense as the team's center and on defense as a linebacker earning All-East recognition. Schroeder also handled the team's long snapping duties.

The Scarlet Knights played their home games at Rutgers Stadium in Piscataway, New Jersey, across the river from the university's main campus in New Brunswick.

== Schedule ==
Date	Opponent	Site	Result	Attendance	Source
September 24	at Princeton*	Palmer Stadium; Princeton, NJ (rivalry)	L 12–16	33,000	
October 1	at Yale*	Yale Bowl; New Haven, CT	W 17–14	16,764	
October 8	at Lehigh	Taylor Stadium; Bethlehem, PA	W 42–14	8,750	
October 15	Army*	Rutgers Stadium; Piscataway, NJ	L 9–14	30,000	
October 22	Columbia*	Rutgers Stadium; Piscataway, NJ	W 37–34	19,500	
October 29	Boston University*	Rutgers Stadium; Piscataway, NJ	W 16–7	12,000	
November 5	Lafayette	Rutgers Stadium; Piscataway, NJ	W 32–28	10,500	
November 12	at Holy Cross*	Fitton Field; Worcester, MA	L 12–24	6,000	
November 19	Colgate*	Rutgers Stadium; Piscataway, NJ	L 7–26	13,500	
*Non-conference game
