= 1966 Colgate Red Raiders football team =

American college football season

1966 Colgate Red Raiders football
- Conference: Independent
- Record: 8–1–1
- Head coach: Hal Lahar (10th season)
- Captain: Raymond Ilg
- Home stadium: Andy Kerr Stadium

1966 NCAA University Division independents football records
	Conf.					Overall
Team	W		L		T	W		L		T
No. 1 Notre Dame		–		–		9	–	0	–	1
Colgate		–		–		8	–	1	–	1
No. 8 Georgia Tech		–		–		9	–	2	–	0
Army		–		–		8	–	2	–	0
Dayton		–		–		8	–	2	–	0
Houston		–		–		8	–	2	–	0
Memphis State		–		–		7	–	2	–	0
No. 9 Miami (FL)		–		–		8	–	2	–	1
Virginia Tech		–		–		8	–	2	–	1
Syracuse		–		–		8	–	3	–	0
Colorado State		–		–		7	–	3	–	0
New Mexico State		–		–		7	–	3	–	0
West Texas State		–		–		7	–	3	–	0
Villanova		–		–		6	–	3	–	0
Holy Cross		–		–		6	–	3	–	1
Southern Miss		–		–		6	–	4	–	0
Texas Western		–		–		6	–	4	–	0
Tulane		–		–		5	–	4	–	1
Florida State		–		–		6	–	5	–	0
Buffalo		–		–		5	–	5	–	0
Penn State		–		–		5	–	5	–	0
Air Force		–		–		4	–	6	–	0
Boston College		–		–		4	–	6	–	0
Navy		–		–		4	–	6	–	0
Utah State		–		–		4	–	6	–	0
Xavier		–		–		4	–	6	–	0
Pacific (CA)		–		–		4	–	7	–	0
San Jose State		–		–		3	–	7	–	0
Pittsburgh		–		–		1	–	9	–	0
Rankings from AP Poll

The 1966 Colgate Red Raiders football team was an American football team that represented Colgate University as an independent during the 1966 NCAA University Division football season. Head coach Hal Lahar returned for a fifth consecutive season, his 10th overall. The team compiled a 8–1–1 record. Raymond Ilg was the team captain.

In its first home game of 1966, Colgate renamed its Hamilton, New York, football field — previously known as Colgate Athletic Field — as Andy Kerr Stadium, honoring Andrew Kerr, the Red Raiders' coach from 1929 to 1946.

== Schedule ==
Date	Opponent	Site	Result	Attendance	Source
September 17	Boston University^{†}	Andy Kerr Stadium; Hamilton, NY	W 34–0	8,000	
September 24	at Columbia	Baker Field; New York, NY	W 38–0	8,681	
October 1	at Cornell	Schoellkopf Field; Ithaca, NY (rivalry)	L 14–15	20,000	
October 8	Holy Cross	Andy Kerr Stadium; Hamilton, NY	T 14–14	8,000	
October 15	at Princeton	Palmer Stadium; Princeton, NJ	W 7–0	34,000	
October 22	at Brown	Brown Stadium; Providence, RI	W 48–7	14,500	
October 29	Lehigh	Andy Kerr Stadium; Hamilton, NY	W 21–15	4,500	
November 5	at Bucknell	Memorial Stadium; Lewisburg, PA	W 20–0	8,963	
November 12	at Lafayette	Fisher Field; Easton, PA	W 20–9	5,000	
November 19	at Rutgers	Rutgers Stadium; Piscataway, NJ	W 26–7	13,500	
^{†}Homecoming

== Leading players ==
Statistical leaders for the 1966 Red Raiders included:

- Rushing: Marvin Hubbard, 893 yards and 13 touchdowns on 191 attempts
- Passing: Ronald Burton, 733 yards, 49 completions and 4 touchdowns on 118 attempts
- Receiving: Douglas Hale, 340 yards on 21 receptions
- Total offense: Ronald Burton, 1,537 yards (733 passing, 804 rushing)
- Scoring: Marvin Hubbard, 88 points from 13 touchdowns, 3 PATs, 2 two-point conversions and 1 field goal
- All-purpose yards: Marvin Hubbard, 1,069 yards (893 rushing, 170 kickoff returning, 6 receiving)
