= 1966 Drexel Dragons football team =

American college football season

1966 Drexel Dragons football
- Conference: Middle Atlantic Conference
- Southern College Division
- Record: 6–1–1 (4–1 MAC)
- Head coach: Tom Grebis (6th season)
- Home stadium: Drexel Field

1966 Middle Atlantic Conference football standings
| | Conf. | | | | | Overall |
| Team | W | | L | | T | W | | L | | T |
|---|---|---|---|---|---|---|---|---|---|---|
University Division
| Delaware x | 6 | – | 0 | – | 0 | 6 | – | 3 | – | 0 |
| Gettysburg | 4 | – | 2 | – | 0 | 7 | – | 2 | – | 0 |
| Temple | 2 | – | 2 | – | 0 | 6 | – | 3 | – | 0 |
| Lafayette | 2 | – | 3 | – | 0 | 3 | – | 6 | – | 0 |
| Bucknell | 2 | – | 3 | – | 0 | 4 | – | 5 | – | 0 |
| Hofstra | 1 | – | 3 | – | 0 | 2 | – | 8 | – | 0 |
| Lehigh | 0 | – | 4 | – | 0 | 0 | – | 9 | – | 0 |
Northern College Division
| Wilkes x | 7 | – | 0 | – | 0 | 8 | – | 0 | – | 0 |
| Upsala | 6 | – | 1 | – | 0 | 6 | – | 2 | – | 0 |
| Delaware Valley | 4 | – | 2 | – | 0 | 5 | – | 3 | – | 0 |
| Lycoming | 4 | – | 3 | – | 0 | 4 | – | 4 | – | 0 |
| Moravian | 4 | – | 4 | – | 1 | 4 | – | 4 | – | 1 |
| Albright | 4 | – | 4 | – | 0 | 4 | – | 5 | – | 0 |
| Juniata | 3 | – | 3 | – | 0 | 4 | – | 4 | – | 0 |
| Wagner | 1 | – | 3 | – | 1 | 2 | – | 6 | – | 1 |
| Susquehanna * | 1 | – | 2 | – | 0 | 3 | – | 6 | – | 0 |
Southern College Division
| Swarthmore x | 6 | – | 0 | – | 1 | 6 | – | 0 | – | 1 |
| Drexel | 4 | – | 1 | – | 0 | 6 | – | 1 | – | 1 |
| Franklin & Marshall | 3 | – | 2 | – | 2 | 3 | – | 3 | – | 2 |
| Dickinson | 4 | – | 3 | – | 1 | 4 | – | 3 | – | 1 |
| Western Maryland | 2 | – | 3 | – | 0 | 4 | – | 5 | – | 0 |
| Ursinus | 2 | – | 4 | – | 1 | 2 | – | 5 | – | 1 |
| Muhlenberg | 2 | – | 6 | – | 1 | 2 | – | 6 | – | 1 |
| Lebanon Valley | 2 | – | 6 | – | 0 | 2 | – | 6 | – | 0 |
| Pennsylvania Military | 2 | – | 6 | – | 0 | 2 | – | 7 | – | 0 |
| Haverford | 1 | – | 5 | – | 0 | 1 | – | 6 | – | 0 |
| Johns Hopkins | 0 | – | 4 | – | 2 | 0 | – | 6 | – | 2 |
| West Chester * | 0 | – | 0 | – | 0 | 8 | – | 1 | – | 0 |
x – Division champion/co-champions; * – Ineligible for championship due to insufficient conference games

The 1966 Drexel Dragons football team represented the Drexel Institute of Technology (renamed Drexel University in 1970) as a member of the Middle Atlantic Conference during the 1966 NCAA College Division football season. Tom Grebis was the team's head coach.

== Schedule ==
| Date | Time | Opponent | Site | Result | Attendance | Source |
|---|---|---|---|---|---|---|
| October 1 | | at Lehigh* | Taylor Stadium; Bethlehem, PA | W 12–9 | 3,500 | |
| October 8 | 1:30 pm | Lebanon Valley | Drexel Field; Philadelphia, PA | W 18–10 | 3,000 | |
| October 15 | 1:30 pm | at Washington and Lee* | Lexington, VA | T 6–6 | 3,500 | |
| October 22 | | Wilkes^{†} | Drexel Field; Philadelphia, PA | L 9–14 | 5,000 | |
| October 29 | | Pennsylvania Military | Drexel Field; Philadelphia, PA | W 14–6 | 2,000 | |
| November 5 | 1:30 pm | Glassboro State* | Drexel Field; Philadelphia, PA | W 27–13 | 3,000 | |
| November 12 | 1:30 pm | Western Maryland | Drexel Field; Philadelphia, PA | W 27–14 | | |
| November 19 | | at Albright | Reading, PA | W 28–27 | | |
*Non-conference game; ^{†}Homecoming; All times are in Eastern time

== Roster ==
1966 Drexel Dragons football team roster
| Players | | | Coaches |
|---|---|---|---|
| Offense: Pos. / # / Name / Class | Defense: Pos. / # / Name / Class | Special teams: Pos. / # / Name / Class | Head coach: Tom Grebis (Drexel); Coordinators/assistant coaches Legend: (C) Team captain; (S) Suspended; (I) Ineligible; Injured; Redshirt |
