= 1966 Columbia Lions football team =

American college football season

1966 Columbia Lions football
- Conference: Ivy League
- Record: 2–7 (2–5 Ivy)
- Head coach: Aldo Donelli (10th season)
- Captains: Richard Flory; Robert Hast
- Home stadium: Baker Field

1966 Ivy League football standings
	Conf.					Overall
Team	W		L		T	W		L		T
Dartmouth +	6	–	1	–	0	7	–	2	–	0
Harvard +	6	–	1	–	0	8	–	1	–	0
Princeton +	6	–	1	–	0	7	–	2	–	0
Cornell	4	–	3	–	0	6	–	3	–	0
Yale	3	–	4	–	0	4	–	5	–	0
Columbia	2	–	5	–	0	2	–	7	–	0
Penn	1	–	6	–	0	2	–	7	–	0
Brown	0	–	7	–	0	1	–	8	–	0
+ – Conference co-champions

The 1966 Columbia Lions football team was an American football team that represented Columbia University during the 1966 NCAA University Division football season. Columbia finished sixth in the Ivy League.

In their tenth season under head coach Aldo "Buff" Donelli, the Lions compiled a 2–7 record and were outscored 306 to 156. Richard Flory and Robert Hast were the team captains.

The Lions' 2–5 conference record placed sixth in the Ivy League standings. Columbia was outscored 231 to 122 by Ivy opponents.

Columbia played its home games at Baker Field in Upper Manhattan, in New York City.

== Schedule ==
Date	Opponent	Site	Result	Attendance	Source
September 24	at Colgate*	Colgate Athletic Field; Hamilton, NY	L 0–38	8,681	
October 1	at Princeton	Palmer Stadium; Princeton, NJ	L 12–14	2,000	
October 8	Harvard^{†}	Baker Field; New York, NY	L 7–34	17,238	
October 15	at Yale	Yale Bowl; New Haven, CT	L 21–44	29,226	
October 22	at Rutgers*	Rutgers Stadium; Piscataway, NJ	L 34–37	19,500	
October 29	Cornell	Baker Field; New York, NY (rivalry)	L 6–31	10,084	
November 5	at Dartmouth	Memorial Field; Hanover, NH	L 14–56	11,000	
November 12	Penn	Baker Field; New York, NY	W 22–14	7,300	
November 19	Brown	Baker Field; New York, NY	W 40–38	5,187	
*Non-conference game; ^{†}Homecoming
