= 1966 Dartmouth Indians football team =

American college football season

1966 Dartmouth Indians football

Ivy League co-champion
- Conference: Ivy League
- Record: 7–2 (6–1 Ivy)
- Head coach: Bob Blackman (12th season)
- Captain: William Calhoun
- Home stadium: Memorial Field

1966 Ivy League football standings
	Conf.					Overall
Team	W		L		T	W		L		T
Dartmouth +	6	–	1	–	0	7	–	2	–	0
Harvard +	6	–	1	–	0	8	–	1	–	0
Princeton +	6	–	1	–	0	7	–	2	–	0
Cornell	4	–	3	–	0	6	–	3	–	0
Yale	3	–	4	–	0	4	–	5	–	0
Columbia	2	–	5	–	0	2	–	7	–	0
Penn	1	–	6	–	0	2	–	7	–	0
Brown	0	–	7	–	0	1	–	8	–	0
+ – Conference co-champions

The 1966 Dartmouth Indians football team was an American football team that represented Dartmouth College during the 1966 NCAA University Division football season. The Indians shared the championship of the Ivy League in a three-way tie.

In their tenth season under head coach Bob Blackman, the Indians compiled a 7–2 record and outscored opponents 273 to 131. William Calhoun was the team captain.

The Indians' 6–1 conference record earned a three-way tie for first place in the Ivy League standings. The Indians outscored Ivy opponents 250 to 117. Dartmouth defeated one of its co-champions, Princeton, and suffered its lone in-conference loss to the other co-champion, Harvard.

Dartmouth played its home games at Memorial Field on the college campus in Hanover, New Hampshire.

== Schedule ==
Date	Opponent	Site	Result	Attendance	Source
September 24	Massachusetts*	Memorial Field; Hanover, NH	W 17–7	12,500	
October 1	at Holy Cross*	Fitton Field; Worcester, MA	L 6–7	12,000	
October 8	Princeton	Memorial Field; Hanover, NH	W 31–13	15,948	
October 15	Brown	Memorial Field; Hanover, NH	W 49–14	11,000	
October 22	at Harvard	Harvard Stadium; Boston, MA (rivalry)	L 14–19	39,909	
October 29	at Yale	Yale Bowl; New Haven, CT	W 28–13	54,360	
November 5	Columbia	Memorial Field; Hanover, NH	W 56–14	11,000	
November 12	at Cornell	Schoellkopf Field; Ithaca, NY (rivalry)	W 32–23	23,000	
November 19	at Penn	Franklin Field; Philadelphia, PA	W 40–21	10,592	
*Non-conference game
