= 1966 Western Michigan Broncos football team =

American college football season

1966 Western Michigan Broncos football

MAC co-champion
- Conference: Mid-American Conference
- Record: 7–3 (5–1 MAC)
- Head coach: Bill Doolittle (3rd season)
- MVP: Bob Rowe
- Captains: Bob Rowe; Gary Crain
- Home stadium: Waldo Stadium

1966 Mid-American Conference football standings
| | Conf. | | | | | Overall |
| Team | W | | L | | T | W | | L | | T |
|---|---|---|---|---|---|---|---|---|---|---|
| Miami (OH) + | 5 | – | 1 | – | 0 | 9 | – | 1 | – | 0 |
| Western Michigan + | 5 | – | 1 | – | 0 | 7 | – | 3 | – | 0 |
| Bowling Green | 4 | – | 2 | – | 0 | 6 | – | 3 | – | 0 |
| Ohio | 3 | – | 3 | – | 0 | 5 | – | 5 | – | 0 |
| Kent State | 2 | – | 4 | – | 0 | 4 | – | 6 | – | 0 |
| Toledo | 1 | – | 5 | – | 0 | 2 | – | 7 | – | 1 |
| Marshall | 1 | – | 5 | – | 0 | 2 | – | 8 | – | 0 |
+ – Conference co-champions

The 1966 Western Michigan Broncos football team represented Western Michigan University in the Mid-American Conference (MAC) during the 1966 NCAA University Division football season. In their third season under head coach Bill Doolittle, the Broncos compiled a 7–3 record (5–1 against MAC opponents), finished in a tie for first place in the MAC, and were outscored by their opponents, 194 to 175. The team played its home games at Waldo Stadium in Kalamazoo, Michigan.

The team's statistical leaders included Jim Boreland with 756 passing yards, Tim Majerle with 731 rushing yards, and Gary Crain with 450 receiving yards. Defensive tackle Bob Rowe and halfback Gary Crain were the team captains. For the second consecutive year, Bob Rowe received the team's most outstanding player award. Bill Doolittle was named the MAC coach of the year.

== Schedule ==
| Date | Opponent | Site | Result | Attendance | Source |
|---|---|---|---|---|---|
| September 17 | Lamar Tech* | Waldo Stadium; Kalamazoo, MI | W 16–14 | 14,000–16,000 | |
| September 24 | Central Michigan | Waldo Stadium; Kalamazoo, MI (rivalry) | W 31–14 | 17,000–17,500 | |
| October 1 | at Miami (OH) | Miami Field; Oxford, OH | L 9–26 | 13,581 | |
| October 8 | Bowling Green | Waldo Stadium; Kalamazoo, MI | W 16–14 | 15,500 | |
| October 15 | at Kent State | Memorial Stadium; Kent, OH | W 23–20 | 17,481 | |
| October 22 | Toledo | Waldo Stadium; Kalamazoo, MI | W 14–13 | 20,500 | |
| October 29 | at Marshall | Fairfield Stadium; Huntington, WV | W 35–29 | 4,100 | |
| November 5 | Ohio | Waldo Stadium; Kalamazoo, MI | W 20–13 | 17,000 | |
| November 12 | at Xavier* | Xavier Stadium; Cincinnati, OH | L 6–21 | 8,412 | |
| November 19 | at West Texas State* | Buffalo Bowl; Canyon, TX | L 7–30 | 10,500 | |
*Non-conference game
