= 1966 Connecticut Huskies football team =

American college football season

1966 Connecticut Huskies football
- Conference: Yankee Conference
- Record: 2–6–1 (2–2–1 Yankee)
- Head coach: John Toner (1st season)
- Home stadium: Memorial Stadium

1966 Yankee Conference football standings
	Conf.					Overall
Team	W		L		T	W		L		T
UMass $	5	–	0	–	0	6	–	3	–	0
Vermont	3	–	2	–	0	6	–	2	–	0
Connecticut	2	–	2	–	1	2	–	6	–	1
Maine	2	–	3	–	0	4	–	5	–	0
Rhode Island	1	–	3	–	1	1	–	7	–	1
New Hampshire	1	–	4	–	0	2	–	6	–	0
$ – Conference champion

The 1966 Connecticut Huskies football team represented the University of Connecticut as a member of the Yankee Conference during the 1966 NCAA College Division football season. Led by first-year head coach John Toner, Huskies compiled an overall record of 2–6–1 with a mark of 2–2–1 in conference play, placing third in the Yankee Conference.

== Schedule ==
Date	Opponent	Site	Result	Attendance	Source
September 24	at Yale*	Yale Bowl; New Haven, CT	L 0–16	30,608	
October 1	Vermont	Memorial Stadium; Storrs, CT	L 10–14	5,000	
October 8	at UMass	Alumni Stadium; Amherst, MA (rivalry)	L 6–12	12,900	
October 15	Maine	Memorial Stadium; Storrs, CT	W 20–19	10,240	
October 22	at No. 12 Temple*	Temple Stadium; Philadelphia, PA	L 25–35	9,500	
October 29	at New Hampshire	Cowell Stadium; Durham, NH	W 15–14	9,000	
November 5	Boston University*	Memorial Stadium; Storrs, CT	L 16–30		
November 12	Rhode Island	Memorial Stadium; Storrs, CT (rivalry)	T 0–0	9,000	
November 19	at Holy Cross*	Fitton Field; Worcester, MA	L 0–16	5,000	
*Non-conference game; Rankings from Coaches' Poll released prior to the game
