= 1966 Cornell Big Red football team =

American college football season

1966 Cornell Big Red football
- Conference: Ivy League
- Record: 6–3 (4–3 Ivy)
- Head coach: Jack Musick (1st season)
- Captain: Fred Devlin
- Home stadium: Schoellkopf Field

1966 Ivy League football standings
	Conf.					Overall
Team	W		L		T	W		L		T
Dartmouth +	6	–	1	–	0	7	–	2	–	0
Harvard +	6	–	1	–	0	8	–	1	–	0
Princeton +	6	–	1	–	0	7	–	2	–	0
Cornell	4	–	3	–	0	6	–	3	–	0
Yale	3	–	4	–	0	4	–	5	–	0
Columbia	2	–	5	–	0	2	–	7	–	0
Penn	1	–	6	–	0	2	–	7	–	0
Brown	0	–	7	–	0	1	–	8	–	0
+ – Conference co-champions

The 1966 Cornell Big Red football team was an American football team that represented Cornell University during the 1966 NCAA University Division football season. Cornell finished fourth in the Ivy League.

In its first season under head coach Jack Musick, the team compiled a 6–3 record and outscored opponents 181 to 157. Fred Devlin was the team captain.

Cornell's 4–3 conference record placed fourth in the Ivy League standings. The Big Red outscored Ivy opponents 138 to 122.

Cornell played its home games at Schoellkopf Field in Ithaca, New York.

== Schedule ==
Date	Opponent	Site	Result	Attendance	Source
September 24	at Buffalo*	Rotary Field; Buffalo, NY	W 28–21	10,958	
October 1	at Colgate*	Colgate Athletic Field; Hamilton, NY (rivalry)	W 15–14	20,000	
October 8	Penn	Schoellkopf Field; Ithaca, NY (rivalry)	W 45–28	18,000	
October 15	at Harvard	Harvard Stadium; Boston, MA	L 0–21	23,000	
October 22	Yale	Schoellkopf Field; Ithaca, NY	W 16–14	20,000	
October 29	at Columbia	Baker Field; New York, NY (rivalry)	W 31–6	10,084	
November 5	at Brown	Brown Stadium; Providence, RI	W 23–14	6,100	
November 12	Dartmouth	Schoellkopf Field; Ithaca, NY (rivalry)	L 23–32	23,000	
November 19	at Princeton	Palmer Stadium; Princeton, NJ	L 0–7	28,000	
*Non-conference game
