= 1966 Toledo Rockets football team =

American college football season

1966 Toledo Rockets football
- Conference: Mid-American Conference
- Record: 2–7–1 (1–5 MAC)
- Head coach: Frank Lauterbur (4th season)
- Home stadium: Glass Bowl

1966 Mid-American Conference football standings
	Conf.					Overall
Team	W		L		T	W		L		T
Miami (OH) +	5	–	1	–	0	9	–	1	–	0
Western Michigan +	5	–	1	–	0	7	–	3	–	0
Bowling Green	4	–	2	–	0	6	–	3	–	0
Ohio	3	–	3	–	0	5	–	5	–	0
Kent State	2	–	4	–	0	4	–	6	–	0
Toledo	1	–	5	–	0	2	–	7	–	1
Marshall	1	–	5	–	0	2	–	8	–	0
+ – Conference co-champions

The 1966 Toledo Rockets football team was an American football team that represented Toledo University in the Mid-American Conference (MAC) during the 1966 NCAA University Division football season. In their fourth season under head coach Frank Lauterbur, the Rockets compiled a 2–7–1 record (1–5 against MAC opponents), tied for sixth place in the MAC, and outscored all opponents by a combined total of 162 to 137.

The team's statistical leaders included John Schneider with 1,537 passing yards, Roland Moss with 443 rushing yards and 38 points scored, and Henry Burch with 480 receiving yards.

== Schedule ==
Date	Opponent	Site	Result	Attendance	Source
September 17	Xavier*	Glass Bowl; Toledo, OH	W 9–0	17,252	
September 24	at Villanova*	Villanova Stadium; Villanova, PA	L 11–20	7,007	
October 1	Marshall	Glass Bowl; Toledo, OH	W 23–7	14,152	
October 8	at Ohio	Peden Stadium; Athens, OH	L 6–21	17,100	
October 15	Bowling Green	Glass Bowl; Toledo, OH (rivalry)	L 13–14	17,501	
October 22	at Western Michigan	Waldo Stadium; Kalamazoo, MI	L 13–14	20,500	
October 29	at Kent State	Memorial Stadium; Kent, OH	L 20–28	14,500	
November 5	Miami (OH)	Glass Bowl; Toledo, OH	L 12–24	9,011	
November 12	Quantico Marines*	Glass Bowl; Toledo, OH	T 14–14		
November 19	at Dayton*	Baujan Field; Dayton, OH	L 16–20	7,398	
*Non-conference game
