= Bob Odell (American football) =

American football player and coach (1922–2012)

Biographical details
- Born: March 5, 1922; Corning, Iowa, U.S.
- Died: December 15, 2012 (aged 90); King of Prussia, Pennsylvania, U.S.

Playing career
- 1941–1943: Penn
- 1946: Card-Pitt
- Position: Halfback

Coaching career (HC unless noted)
- 1946–1947: Yale (assistant)
- 1948: Temple (assistant)
- 1949–1957: Wisconsin (line)
- 1958–1964: Buckell
- 1965–1970: Penn
- 1971–1986: Williams

Head coaching record
- Overall: 75–49–4

Accomplishments and honors

Championships
- 2 Lambert Cup (1960, 1964)

Awards
- Maxwell Award (1943); 2× Consensus All-American (1943, 1944); First-team All-Eastern (1943)
- College Football Hall of Fame; Inducted in 1992 (profile)

Robert Harper Odell (March 5, 1922 – December 15, 2012) was an American football player and coach. He grew up in Sioux City, Iowa and was a multi-sport athlete at East High School. He played college football as a halfback for the Penn Quakers, where he won the Maxwell Award in 1943 and finished second in Heisman voting that same year. He was selected in the second round (15th overall) of the 1944 NFL draft by the Pittsburgh Steelers, but served in the United States Navy from 1944 through 1946. The Steelers offered Odell $8,000 to play in the 1946 season, however, his doctor recommended that he give up football due to a knee injury suffered while playing basketball. He was inducted into the College Football Hall of Fame in 1992.

== Head coaching career ==
He was the head football coach at the University of Pennsylvania from 1965 to 1970, and at Williams College from 1971 to 1986. With a record of 75–49–4 in 16 years as the head coach at Williams, Odell ranks third in career wins behind Dick Farley and Charlie Caldwell.

== Death ==
He died of kidney disease in a nursing home in 2012.

== Head coaching record ==
Year	Team	Overall	Conference	Standing	Bowl/playoffs
Bucknell Bison (Middle Atlantic Conference) (1958–1964)
1958	Bucknell	1–8	1–5	6th (University)	
1959	Bucknell	4–5	3–3	4th (University)	
1960	Bucknell	7–2	5–1	2nd (University)	
1961	Bucknell	6–3	5–2	2nd (University)	
1962	Bucknell	6–3	5–1	2nd (University)	
1963	Bucknell	6–3	3–1	2nd (University)	
1964	Bucknell	7–2	4–1	T–2nd (University)	
Bucknell:		37–26	26–14		
Penn Quakers (Ivy League) (1965–1970)
1965	Penn	4–4–1	2–4–1	6th	
1966	Penn	2–7	1–6	7th	
1967	Penn	3–6	2–5	6th	
1968	Penn	7–2	5–2	3rd	
1969	Penn	4–5	2–5	T–5th	
1970	Penn	4–5	2–5	6th	
Penn:		24–29–1	14–27–1		
Williams Ephs (Little Three Conference) (1971–1986)
1971	Williams	7–1	2–0	1st	
1972	Williams	7–1	2–0	1st	
1973	Williams	6–2	2–0	1st	
1974	Williams	7–1	2–0	1st	
1975	Williams	7–0–1	2–0	1st	
1976	Williams	4–4			
1977	Williams	5–3			
1978	Williams	5–3			
1979	Williams	4–4			
1980	Williams	5–2–1			
1981	Williams	3–5			
1982	Williams	4–4			
1983	Williams	2–5–1			
1984	Williams	3–5			
1985	Williams	2–5–1			
1986	Williams	4–4			
Williams:		75–49–4			
Total:		136–104–5			
National championship Conference title Conference division title or championship game berth
