= 1966 Maine Black Bears football team =

American college football season

1966 Maine Black Bears football
- Conference: Yankee Conference
- Record: 4–5 (2–3 Yankee)
- Head coach: Harold Westerman (16th season)
- Captains: John Huard; Charles Belisle
- Home stadium: Alumni Field

1966 Yankee Conference football standings
	Conf.					Overall
Team	W		L		T	W		L		T
UMass $	5	–	0	–	0	6	–	3	–	0
Vermont	3	–	2	–	0	6	–	2	–	0
Connecticut	2	–	2	–	1	2	–	6	–	1
Maine	2	–	3	–	0	4	–	5	–	0
Rhode Island	1	–	3	–	1	1	–	7	–	1
New Hampshire	1	–	4	–	0	2	–	6	–	0
$ – Conference champion

The 1966 Maine Black Bears football team was an American football team that represented the University of Maine as a member of the Yankee Conference during the 1966 NCAA College Division football season. In its 16th and final season under head coach Harold Westerman, the team compiled a 4–5 record (2–3 against conference opponents) and finished fourth out of the six teams in the Yankee Conference. John Huard and Charles Belisle were the team captains.

== Schedule ==
Date	Opponent	Site	Result	Attendance	Source
September 17	at UMass	Alumni Field; Amherst, MA	L 7–10	15,200	
September 24	Boston University*	Alumni Field; Orono, ME	L 7–20	8,012	
October 1	Bucknell*	Alumni Field; Orono, ME	W 7–6	4,439	
October 8	at New Hampshire	Cowell Stadium; Durham, NH	L 7–10	10,400	
October 15	at Connecticut	Memorial Stadium; Storrs, CT	L 19–20	10,240	
October 22	Rhode Island	Meade Stadium; Kingston, RI	W 21–6	8,900	
October 29	Colby*	Alumni Field; Orono, ME	W 31–6	5,494	
November 5	at Youngstown State*	Rayen Stadium; Youngstown, OH	L 6–14	1,700	
November 12	Vermont	Alumni Field; Orono, ME	W 52–7	7,179–7,197	
*Non-conference game

== After the season ==
The following Black Bear was selected in the 1967 NFL/AFL draft after the season.

Round	Pick	Player	Position	AFL club
5	113	John Huard	Linebacker	Denver Broncos
