= 1966 Vermont Catamounts football team =

American college football season

1966 Vermont Catamounts football
- Conference: Yankee Conference
- Record: 6–2 (3–2 Yankee)
- Head coach: Bob Clifford (5th season)
- Home stadium: Centennial Field

1966 Yankee Conference football standings
	Conf.					Overall
Team	W		L		T	W		L		T
UMass $	5	–	0	–	0	6	–	3	–	0
Vermont	3	–	2	–	0	6	–	2	–	0
Connecticut	2	–	2	–	1	2	–	6	–	1
Maine	2	–	3	–	0	4	–	5	–	0
Rhode Island	1	–	3	–	1	1	–	7	–	1
New Hampshire	1	–	4	–	0	2	–	6	–	0
$ – Conference champion

The 1966 Vermont Catamounts football team was an American football team that represented the University of Vermont in the Yankee Conference during the 1966 NCAA College Division football season. In their fifth year under head coach Bob Clifford, the team compiled a 6–2 record.

== Schedule ==
Date	Opponent	Site	Result	Attendance	Source
September 17	American International*	Centennial Field; Burlington, VT	W 35–12	6,000	
October 1	at Connecticut	Memorial Stadium; Storrs, CT	W 14–10	5,000	
October 8	at Rhode Island	Meade Stadium; Kingston, RI	W 21–7	11,331–11,600	
October 15	New Hampshire	Centennial Field; Burlington, VT	W 32–24	8,500	
October 22	at Norwich*	Sabine Field; Northfield, VT	W 43–0	6,000	
October 29	UMass	Centennial Field; Burlington, VT	L 21–27	10,000	
November 5	Middlebury*	Centennial Field; Burlington, VT	W 27–3	5,500	
November 12	at Maine	Alumni Field; Orono, ME	L 7–52	7,179–7,197	
*Non-conference game

== After the season ==
The following Catamount was selected in the 1967 NFL/AFL draft after the season.

Round	Pick	Player	Position	AFL club
15	380	Jack Schweberger	Wide receiver	New York Jets
