= 1966 Brown Bears football team =

American college football season

1966 Brown Bears football
- Conference: Ivy League
- Record: 1–8 (0–7 Ivy)
- Head coach: John McLaughry (8th season)
- Captains: Terry Boyle; Wynn Jessup
- Home stadium: Brown Stadium

1966 Ivy League football standings
	Conf.					Overall
Team	W		L		T	W		L		T
Dartmouth +	6	–	1	–	0	7	–	2	–	0
Harvard +	6	–	1	–	0	8	–	1	–	0
Princeton +	6	–	1	–	0	7	–	2	–	0
Cornell	4	–	3	–	0	6	–	3	–	0
Yale	3	–	4	–	0	4	–	5	–	0
Columbia	2	–	5	–	0	2	–	7	–	0
Penn	1	–	6	–	0	2	–	7	–	0
Brown	0	–	7	–	0	1	–	8	–	0
+ – Conference co-champions

The 1966 Brown Bears football team was an American football team that represented Brown University during the 1966 NCAA University Division football season. Brown finished last in the Ivy League.

In their eighth and final season under head coach John McLaughry, the Bears compiled a 1–8 record and were outscored 266 to 137. Terry Boyle and Wynn Jessup were the team captains.

The Bears' 0–7 conference record placed last in the Ivy League standings. They were outscored by Ivy opponents 204 to 80.

Brown played its home games at Brown Stadium in Providence, Rhode Island.

== Schedule ==
Date	Opponent	Site	Result	Attendance	Source
September 24	Rhode Island*	Brown Stadium; Providence, RI (rivalry)	W 40–14	13,300–13,600	
October 1	Penn	Brown Stadium; Providence, RI	L 0–20	3,500	
October 8	at Yale	Yale Bowl; New Haven, CT	L 0–24	29,777	
October 15	at Dartmouth	Memorial Field; Hanover, NH	L 14–49	11,000	
October 22	Colgate*	Brown Stadium; Providence, RI	L 7–48	14,500	
October 29	Princeton^{†}	Brown Stadium; Providence, RI	L 17–24	11,700	
November 5	Cornell	Brown Stadium; Providence, RI	L 14–23	6,100	
November 12	at Harvard	Harvard Stadium; Boston, MA	L 7–24	11,000	
November 19	at Columbia	Baker Field; New York, NY	L 38–40	5,187	
*Non-conference game; ^{†}Homecoming
