= 1966 Dayton Flyers football team =

American college football season

1966 Dayton Flyers football
- Conference: Independent
- Record: 8–2
- Head coach: John McVay (2nd season)
- Home stadium: Baujan Field

1966 NCAA University Division independents football records
	Conf.					Overall
Team	W		L		T	W		L		T
No. 1 Notre Dame		–		–		9	–	0	–	1
Colgate		–		–		8	–	1	–	1
No. 8 Georgia Tech		–		–		9	–	2	–	0
Army		–		–		8	–	2	–	0
Dayton		–		–		8	–	2	–	0
Houston		–		–		8	–	2	–	0
Memphis State		–		–		7	–	2	–	0
No. 9 Miami (FL)		–		–		8	–	2	–	1
Virginia Tech		–		–		8	–	2	–	1
Syracuse		–		–		8	–	3	–	0
Colorado State		–		–		7	–	3	–	0
New Mexico State		–		–		7	–	3	–	0
West Texas State		–		–		7	–	3	–	0
Villanova		–		–		6	–	3	–	0
Holy Cross		–		–		6	–	3	–	1
Southern Miss		–		–		6	–	4	–	0
Texas Western		–		–		6	–	4	–	0
Tulane		–		–		5	–	4	–	1
Florida State		–		–		6	–	5	–	0
Buffalo		–		–		5	–	5	–	0
Penn State		–		–		5	–	5	–	0
Air Force		–		–		4	–	6	–	0
Boston College		–		–		4	–	6	–	0
Navy		–		–		4	–	6	–	0
Utah State		–		–		4	–	6	–	0
Xavier		–		–		4	–	6	–	0
Pacific (CA)		–		–		4	–	7	–	0
San Jose State		–		–		3	–	7	–	0
Pittsburgh		–		–		1	–	9	–	0
Rankings from AP Poll

The 1966 Dayton Flyers football team represented the University of Dayton as an independent during the 1966 NCAA University Division football season. In their second season under head coach John McVay, the Flyers compiled a 8–2 record. Dayton played their home games at Baujan Field in Dayton, Ohio.

== Schedule ==
Date	Opponent	Site	Result	Attendance	Source
September 17	Richmond	Baujan Field; Dayton, OH	W 23–0		
September 24	at Cincinnati	Nippert Stadium; Cincinnati, OH	W 23–7	18,000	
October 1	at Bowling Green	Doyt Perry Stadium; Bowling Green, OH	L 0–13	17,235	
October 8	Louisville	Baujan Field; Dayton, OH	W 20–17		
October 15	Buffalo	Baujan Field; Dayton, OH	W 13–3	12,599	
October 22	Northern Michigan	Baujan Field; Dayton, OH	W 10–0		
October 29	at Ohio	Peden Stadium; Athens, OH	W 20–12	19,182	
November 5	Xavier	Baujan Field; Dayton, OH	W 9–2	10,300	
November 12	at Miami (OH)	Miami Field; Oxford, OH	L 6–38	17,000	
November 19	Toledo	Baujan Field; Dayton, OH	W 20–16	7,398	
