= 1966 Penn Quakers football team =

American college football season

1966 Penn Quakers football
- Conference: Ivy League
- Record: 2–7 (1–6 Ivy)
- Head coach: Bob Odell (2nd season)
- Captain: Jerry Petrisko
- Home stadium: Franklin Field

1966 Ivy League football standings
	Conf.					Overall
Team	W		L		T	W		L		T
Dartmouth +	6	–	1	–	0	7	–	2	–	0
Harvard +	6	–	1	–	0	8	–	1	–	0
Princeton +	6	–	1	–	0	7	–	2	–	0
Cornell	4	–	3	–	0	6	–	3	–	0
Yale	3	–	4	–	0	4	–	5	–	0
Columbia	2	–	5	–	0	2	–	7	–	0
Penn	1	–	6	–	0	2	–	7	–	0
Brown	0	–	7	–	0	1	–	8	–	0
+ – Conference co-champions

The 1966 Penn Quakers football team was an American football team that represented the University of Pennsylvania during the 1966 NCAA University Division football season. Penn finished second-to-last in the Ivy League. During their second year under head coach Bob Odell, the Quakers compiled a 2–7 record and were outscored 237 to 176. Jerry Petrisko was the team captain.

Penn's 1–6 conference record placed the team as seventh in the Ivy League. The team was outscored 181 to 117 by Ivy opponents.

Penn played its home games at Franklin Field, adjacent to the university's campus in Philadelphia, Pennsylvania.

== Schedule ==
Date	Opponent	Site	Result	Attendance	Source
September 24	Lehigh*	Franklin Field; Philadelphia, PA	W 38–28	7,794–7,900	
October 1	at Brown	Brown Stadium; Providence, RI	W 20–0	3,500	
October 8	at Cornell	Schoellkopf Field; Ithaca, NY (rivalry)	L 28–45	18,000	
October 15	Bucknell*	Franklin Field; Philadelphia, PA	L 21–28	10,672	
October 22	Princeton	Franklin Field; Philadelphia, PA (rivalry)	L 13–30	20,844	
October 29	at Harvard	Harvard Stadium; Boston, MA (rivalry)	L 7–27	20,000	
November 5	Yale	Franklin Field; Philadelphia, PA	L 14–17	13,638	
November 12	at Columbia	Baker Field; New York, NY	L 14–22	7,300	
November 19	Dartmouth	Franklin Field; Philadelphia, PA	L 21–40	10,592	
*Non-conference game

== Roster ==
1966 Penn Quakers football team roster
Players
Coaches
Offense

Pos.	#	Name	Class
G	59	Wayne Anderson	Jr
RB	18	George Burrell	So
QB	14	Peter Wisniewski	Jr

Defense

Pos.	#	Name	Class
DE	87	Jordy Allen	Sr

Special teams

Pos.	#	Name	Class

Head coach

- Bob Odell

Coordinators/assistant coaches

Legend

- (C) Team captain
- (S) Suspended
- (I) Ineligible
- Injured
- Redshirt
