= 1966 Bowling Green Falcons football team =

American college football season

1966 Bowling Green Falcons football
- Conference: Mid-American Conference
- Record: 6–3 (4–2 MAC)
- Head coach: Bob Gibson (2nd season)
- Home stadium: Doyt Perry Stadium

1966 Mid-American Conference football standings
	Conf.					Overall
Team	W		L		T	W		L		T
Miami (OH) +	5	–	1	–	0	9	–	1	–	0
Western Michigan +	5	–	1	–	0	7	–	3	–	0
Bowling Green	4	–	2	–	0	6	–	3	–	0
Ohio	3	–	3	–	0	5	–	5	–	0
Kent State	2	–	4	–	0	4	–	6	–	0
Toledo	1	–	5	–	0	2	–	7	–	1
Marshall	1	–	5	–	0	2	–	8	–	0
+ – Conference co-champions

The 1966 Bowling Green Falcons football team was an American football team that represented Bowling Green State University in the Mid-American Conference (MAC) during the 1966 NCAA University Division football season. In their second season under head coach Bob Gibson, the Falcons compiled a 6–3 record (4–2 against MAC opponents), finished in third place in the MAC, and outscored opponents by a combined total of 187 to 124.

The team's statistical leaders included P.J. Nyitray with 431 passing yards, Dave Cranmer with 374 rushing yards, and Eddie Jones with 525 receiving yards.

== Schedule ==
Date	Opponent	Site	Result	Attendance	Source
September 24	at Tampa*	Phillips Field; Tampa, FL	L 13–20	9,000	
October 1	Dayton*	Doyt Perry Stadium; Bowling Green, OH	W 13–0	17,235	
October 8	at Western Michigan	Waldo Stadium; Kalamazoo, MI	L 14–16	15,500	
October 15	at Toledo	Glass Bowl; Toledo, OH (rivalry)	W 14–13	17,501	
October 22	Kent State	Doyt Perry Stadium; Bowling Green, OH (rivalry)	L 12–35	18,751	
October 29	at Miami (OH)	Miami Field; Oxford, OH	W 17–14	12,942	
November 5	Marshall	Doyt Perry Stadium; Bowling Green, OH	W 14–6	10,300	
November 12	Ohio	Doyt Perry Stadium; Bowling Green, OH	W 28–0	15,068	
November 19	at Temple*	Temple Stadium; Philadelphia, PA	W 62–20	6,000–6,500	
*Non-conference game
