= 1966 New Hampshire Wildcats football team =

American college football season

1966 New Hampshire Wildcats football
- Conference: Yankee Conference
- Record: 2–6 (1–4 Yankee)
- Head coach: Joe Yukica (1st season)
- Home stadium: Cowell Stadium

1966 Yankee Conference football standings
	Conf.					Overall
Team	W		L		T	W		L		T
UMass $	5	–	0	–	0	6	–	3	–	0
Vermont	3	–	2	–	0	6	–	2	–	0
Connecticut	2	–	2	–	1	2	–	6	–	1
Maine	2	–	3	–	0	4	–	5	–	0
Rhode Island	1	–	3	–	1	1	–	7	–	1
New Hampshire	1	–	4	–	0	2	–	6	–	0
$ – Conference champion

The 1966 New Hampshire Wildcats football team was an American football team that represented the University of New Hampshire as a member of the Yankee Conference during the 1966 NCAA College Division football season. In its first year under head coach Joe Yukica, the team compiled a 2–6 record (1–4 against conference opponents) and finished last out of six teams in the Yankee Conference.

== Schedule ==
Date	Opponent	Site	Result	Attendance	Source
September 24	at Colby*	Seaverns Field; Waterville, ME	L 14–18	1,800	
October 1	Rhode Island	Cowell Stadium; Durham, NH	L 6–17	2,500–5,000	
October 8	Maine	Cowell Stadium; Durham, NH (Battle for the Brice–Cowell Musket)	W 10–7	10,400	
October 15	at Vermont	Centennial Field; Burlington, VT	L 24–32	8,500	
October 22	at Northeastern*	Parsons Field; Brookline, MA	L 14–15	8,700	
October 29	Connecticut	Cowell Stadium; Durham, NH	L 14–15	9,000	
November 5	Springfield*	Cowell Stadium; Durham, NH	W 28–21	7,500	
November 12	at UMass	Alumni Stadium; Hadley, MA (rivalry)	L 7–14	6,400	
*Non-conference game
