= 1966 Holy Cross Crusaders football team =

American college football season

1966 Holy Cross Crusaders football
- Conference: Independent
- Record: 6–3–1
- Head coach: Mel Massucco (2nd season)
- Captain: R. Peter Kimener
- Home stadium: Fitton Field

1966 NCAA University Division independents football records
	Conf.					Overall
Team	W		L		T	W		L		T
No. 1 Notre Dame		–		–		9	–	0	–	1
Colgate		–		–		8	–	1	–	1
No. 8 Georgia Tech		–		–		9	–	2	–	0
Army		–		–		8	–	2	–	0
Dayton		–		–		8	–	2	–	0
Houston		–		–		8	–	2	–	0
Memphis State		–		–		7	–	2	–	0
No. 9 Miami (FL)		–		–		8	–	2	–	1
Virginia Tech		–		–		8	–	2	–	1
Syracuse		–		–		8	–	3	–	0
Colorado State		–		–		7	–	3	–	0
New Mexico State		–		–		7	–	3	–	0
West Texas State		–		–		7	–	3	–	0
Villanova		–		–		6	–	3	–	0
Holy Cross		–		–		6	–	3	–	1
Southern Miss		–		–		6	–	4	–	0
Texas Western		–		–		6	–	4	–	0
Tulane		–		–		5	–	4	–	1
Florida State		–		–		6	–	5	–	0
Buffalo		–		–		5	–	5	–	0
Penn State		–		–		5	–	5	–	0
Air Force		–		–		4	–	6	–	0
Boston College		–		–		4	–	6	–	0
Navy		–		–		4	–	6	–	0
Utah State		–		–		4	–	6	–	0
Xavier		–		–		4	–	6	–	0
Pacific (CA)		–		–		4	–	7	–	0
San Jose State		–		–		3	–	7	–	0
Pittsburgh		–		–		1	–	9	–	0
Rankings from AP Poll

The 1966 Holy Cross Crusaders football team was an American football team that represented the College of the Holy Cross as an independent during the 1966 NCAA University Division football season. Mel Massucco returned for his second year as head coach. The team compiled a record of 6–3–1.

All home games were played at Fitton Field on the Holy Cross campus in Worcester, Massachusetts.

== Schedule ==
Date	Opponent	Site	Result	Attendance	Source
September 24	at Army	Michie Stadium; West Point, NY	L 0–14	28,000	
October 1	Dartmouth^{†}	Fitton Field; Worcester, MA	W 7–6	12,000	
October 8	at Colgate	Andy Kerr Stadium; Hamilton, NY	T 14–14	8,000	
October 15	at Boston University	Nickerson Field; Boston, MA	W 17–14	15,000	
October 22	Syracuse	Fitton Field; Worcester, MA	L 6–28	19,000	
October 29	at Buffalo	Rotary Field; Buffalo, NY	L 3–35	10,303	
November 5	No. 7 UMass^	Fitton Field; Worcester, MA	W 16–14	15,000	
November 12	Rutgers	Fitton Field; Worcester, MA	W 24–12	6,000	
November 19	Connecticut	Fitton Field; Worcester, MA	W 16–0	5,000	
November 26	at Boston College	Alumni Stadium; Chestnut Hill, MA (rivalry)	W 32–26	26,000	
^{†}Homecoming; ^ Family Weekend; Rankings from AP Poll released prior to the game

== Statistical leaders ==
Statistical leaders for the 1966 Crusaders included:

- Rushing: Jack Lentz, 685 yards and 7 touchdowns on 177 attempts
- Passing: Jack Lentz, 845 yards, 74 completions and 5 touchdowns on 153 attempts
- Receiving: Pete Kimener, 409 yards and 2 touchdowns on 33 receptions
- Scoring: Jack Lentz, 42 points from 7 touchdowns
- Total offense: Jack Lentz, 1,530 yards (845 passing, 685 rushing)
- All-purpose yards: Jack Lentz, 704 yards (685 rushing, 19 receiving)
