= 1966 Bucknell Bison football team =

American college football season

1966 Bucknell Bison football
- Conference: Middle Atlantic Conference
- University Division
- Record: 4–5 (2–3 MAC)
- Head coach: Carroll Huntress (2nd season)
- Captains: Bob Marks; Mike Vincent
- Home stadium: Memorial Stadium

1966 Middle Atlantic Conference football standings
	Conf.					Overall
Team	W		L		T	W		L		T
University Division
Delaware x	6	–	0	–	0	6	–	3	–	0
Gettysburg	4	–	2	–	0	7	–	2	–	0
Temple	2	–	2	–	0	6	–	3	–	0
Lafayette	2	–	3	–	0	3	–	6	–	0
Bucknell	2	–	3	–	0	4	–	5	–	0
Hofstra	1	–	3	–	0	2	–	8	–	0
Lehigh	0	–	4	–	0	0	–	9	–	0
Northern College Division
Wilkes x	7	–	0	–	0	8	–	0	–	0
Upsala	6	–	1	–	0	6	–	2	–	0
Delaware Valley	4	–	2	–	0	5	–	3	–	0
Lycoming	4	–	3	–	0	4	–	4	–	0
Moravian	4	–	4	–	1	4	–	4	–	1
Albright	4	–	4	–	0	4	–	5	–	0
Juniata	3	–	3	–	0	4	–	4	–	0
Wagner	1	–	3	–	1	2	–	6	–	1
Susquehanna *	1	–	2	–	0	3	–	6	–	0
Southern College Division
Swarthmore x	6	–	0	–	1	6	–	0	–	1
Drexel	4	–	1	–	0	6	–	1	–	1
Franklin & Marshall	3	–	2	–	2	3	–	3	–	2
Dickinson	4	–	3	–	1	4	–	3	–	1
Western Maryland	2	–	3	–	0	4	–	5	–	0
Ursinus	2	–	4	–	1	2	–	5	–	1
Muhlenberg	2	–	6	–	1	2	–	6	–	1
Lebanon Valley	2	–	6	–	0	2	–	6	–	0
Pennsylvania Military	2	–	6	–	0	2	–	7	–	0
Haverford	1	–	5	–	0	1	–	6	–	0
Johns Hopkins	0	–	4	–	2	0	–	6	–	2
West Chester *	0	–	0	–	0	8	–	1	–	0
x – Division champion/co-champions; * – Ineligible for championship due to insufficient conference games

The 1966 Bucknell Bison football team was an American football team that represented Bucknell University as a member of the University Division of the Middle Atlantic Conference (MAC) during the 1966 NCAA College Division football season. In their second year under head coach Carroll Huntress, the Bison compiled an overall record of 4–5 with a mark of 2–3 in conference play, tying with Lafayette for fourth place in the seven-team circuit. Bob Marks and Mike Vincent were the team captains. Bucknell played home games at Memorial Stadium on the university's campus in Lewisburg, Pennsylvania.

== Schedule ==
Date	Opponent	Site	Result	Attendance	Source
September 24	Gettysburg	Memorial Stadium; Lewisburg, PA	W 16–10	6,000	
October 1	at Maine*	Alumni Field; Orono, ME	L 6–7	4,439	
October 8	at Temple	Temple Stadium; Philadelphia, PA	L 28–82	7,000	
October 15	at Penn*	Franklin Field; Philadelphia, PA	W 28–21	10,672	
October 22	Lafayette^{†}	Memorial Stadium; Lewisburg, PA	L 7–25	8,372	
October 29	Rhode Island*	Memorial Stadium; Lewisburg, PA	W 33–7	6,243–7,000	
November 5	Colgate^*	Memorial Stadium; Lewisburg, PA	L 0–20	8,963	
November 12	at Lehigh	Taylor Stadium; Bethlehem, PA	W 45–0	5,000	
November 19	at Delaware	Delaware Stadium; Newark, DE	L 20–45	10,099	
*Non-conference game; ^{†}Homecoming; ^ Parents Weekend
