= 1966 UMass Redmen football team =

American college football season

1966 UMass Redmen football

Yankee Conference champion
- Conference: Yankee Conference

Ranking
- Coaches: No. 10
- Record: 6–3 (5–0 Yankee)
- Head coach: Vic Fusia (6th season)
- Home stadium: Alumni Stadium

1966 Yankee Conference football standings
	Conf.					Overall
Team	W		L		T	W		L		T
UMass $	5	–	0	–	0	6	–	3	–	0
Vermont	3	–	2	–	0	6	–	2	–	0
Connecticut	2	–	2	–	1	2	–	6	–	1
Maine	2	–	3	–	0	4	–	5	–	0
Rhode Island	1	–	3	–	1	1	–	7	–	1
New Hampshire	1	–	4	–	0	2	–	6	–	0
$ – Conference champion

The 1966 UMass Redmen football team represented the University of Massachusetts Amherst in the 1966 NCAA College Division football season as a member of the Yankee Conference. The team was coached by Vic Fusia and played its home games at Alumni Stadium in Hadley, Massachusetts. UMass finished the season with a record of 6–3 overall and 5–0 in conference play, winning the conference championship.

== Schedule ==
Date	Opponent	Rank	Site	Result	Attendance	Source
September 17	Maine		Alumni Stadium; Hadley, MA	W 10–7	15,200	
September 24	at Dartmouth*		Memorial Field; Hanover, NH	L 7–17	12,500	
October 8	Connecticut		Alumni Stadium; Hadley, MA (rivalry)	W 12–6	12,900	
October 15	at Rhode Island		Meade Stadium; Kingston, RI	W 14–9	5,100–5,630	
October 22	Boston University*		Alumni Stadium; Hadley, MA	W 12–7	18,700	
October 29	at Vermont		Centennial Field; Burlington, VT	W 27–21	10,000	
November 5	at Holy Cross*	No. 7	Fitton Field; Worcester, MA	L 14–16	15,000	
November 12	New Hampshire		Alumni Stadium; Hadley, MA (rivalry)	W 14–7	6,400	
November 19	Boston College*		Alumni Stadium; Hadley, MA (rivalry)	L 7–14	16,700	
*Non-conference game; Rankings from AP Poll released prior to the game
