= 1966 Kent State Golden Flashes football team =

American college football season

1966 Kent State Golden Flashes football
- Conference: Mid-American Conference
- Record: 4–6 (2–4 MAC)
- Head coach: Leo Strang (3rd season)
- Home stadium: Memorial Stadium

1966 Mid-American Conference football standings
	Conf.					Overall
Team	W		L		T	W		L		T
Miami (OH) +	5	–	1	–	0	9	–	1	–	0
Western Michigan +	5	–	1	–	0	7	–	3	–	0
Bowling Green	4	–	2	–	0	6	–	3	–	0
Ohio	3	–	3	–	0	5	–	5	–	0
Kent State	2	–	4	–	0	4	–	6	–	0
Toledo	1	–	5	–	0	2	–	7	–	1
Marshall	1	–	5	–	0	2	–	8	–	0
+ – Conference co-champions

The 1966 Kent State Golden Flashes football team was an American football team that represented Kent State University in the Mid-American Conference (MAC) during the 1966 NCAA University Division football season. In their third season under head coach Leo Strang, the Golden Flashes compiled a 4–6 record (2–4 against MAC opponents), finished in fifth place in the MAC, and outscored all opponents by a combined total of 211 to 161.

The team's statistical leaders included Don Fitzgerald with 1,245 rushing yards, Ron Swartz with 879 passing yards, and Billy Blunt with 287 receiving yards. Five Kent State players were selected as first-team All-MAC players: defensive end Don Abbott, offensive guard Jon Brooks, halfback Don Fitzgerald, defensive back Lou Harris, and linebacker Bill Landis.

== Schedule ==
Date	Opponent	Site	Result	Attendance	Source
September 17	Buffalo*	Memorial Stadium; Kent, OH	L 23–27	14,500	
September 24	at Northern Illinois*	Huskie Stadium; DeKalb, IL	W 26–7	13,129–18,000	
October 1	Ohio	Memorial Stadium; Kent, OH	L 10–12	16,500	
October 8	at Miami (OH)	Miami Field; Oxford, OH	L 0–7	16,038	
October 15	Western Michigan	Memorial Stadium; Kent, OH	L 20–23	17,481	
October 22	at Bowling Green	Doyt Perry Stadium; Bowling Green, OH (rivalry)	W 35–12	18,751	
October 29	Toledo	Memorial Stadium; Kent, OH	W 28–20	14,500	
November 5	at Louisville*	Fairgrounds Stadium; Louisville, KY	L 20–23	5,000	
November 12	at Marshall	Fairfield Stadium; Huntington, WV	L 7–16	5,000	
November 19	Xavier*	Memorial Stadium; Kent, OH	W 42–14	4,283	
*Non-conference game
