= 1966 Harvard Crimson football team =

American college football season

1966 Harvard Crimson football

Ivy League co-champion
- Conference: Ivy League
- Record: 8–1 (6–1 Ivy)
- Head coach: John Yovicsin (10th season)
- Defensive coordinator: James S. Lentz (5th season)
- Captain: Justin P. Hughes
- Home stadium: Harvard Stadium

1966 Ivy League football standings
	Conf.					Overall
Team	W		L		T	W		L		T
Dartmouth +	6	–	1	–	0	7	–	2	–	0
Harvard +	6	–	1	–	0	8	–	1	–	0
Princeton +	6	–	1	–	0	7	–	2	–	0
Cornell	4	–	3	–	0	6	–	3	–	0
Yale	3	–	4	–	0	4	–	5	–	0
Columbia	2	–	5	–	0	2	–	7	–	0
Penn	1	–	6	–	0	2	–	7	–	0
Brown	0	–	7	–	0	1	–	8	–	0
+ – Conference co-champions

The 1966 Harvard Crimson football team was an American football team that represented Harvard University during the 1966 NCAA University Division football season. Harvard shared the championship of the Ivy League in a three-way tie.

In their tenth year under head coach John Yovicsin, the Crimson compiled an 8–1 record and outscored opponents 231 to 60. Justin P. Hughes was the team captain.

Harvard's 6–1 conference record earned a three-way tie for first place in the Ivy League standings. The Crimson outscored Ivy opponents 156 to 53. Harvard defeated one of its co-champions, Dartmouth, and suffered its lone loss to the other co-champion, Princeton.

Harvard played its home games at Harvard Stadium in the Allston neighborhood of Boston, Massachusetts.

Actor Tommy Lee Jones was a guard on the team.

== Schedule ==
Date	Opponent	Site	Result	Attendance	Source
September 24	Lafayette*	Harvard Stadium; Boston, MA	W 30–7	13,000	
October 1	Tufts*	Harvard Stadium; Boston, MA	W 45–0	7,982	
October 8	at Columbia	Baker Field; New York, NY	W 34–7	17,238	
October 15	Cornell	Harvard Stadium; Boston, MA	W 21–0	23,000	
October 22	Dartmouth	Harvard Stadium; Boston, MA (rivalry)	W 19–14	39,909	
October 29	Penn	Harvard Stadium; Boston, MA (rivalry)	W 27–7	20,000	
November 5	at Princeton	Palmer Stadium; Princeton, NJ	L 14–18	35,000	
November 12	Brown	Harvard Stadium; Boston, MA	W 24–7	11,000	
November 19	Yale	Harvard Stadium; Boston, MA (The Game)	W 17–0	41,000	
*Non-conference game
