= Ben Smith (CrossFit) =

American CrossFit athlete

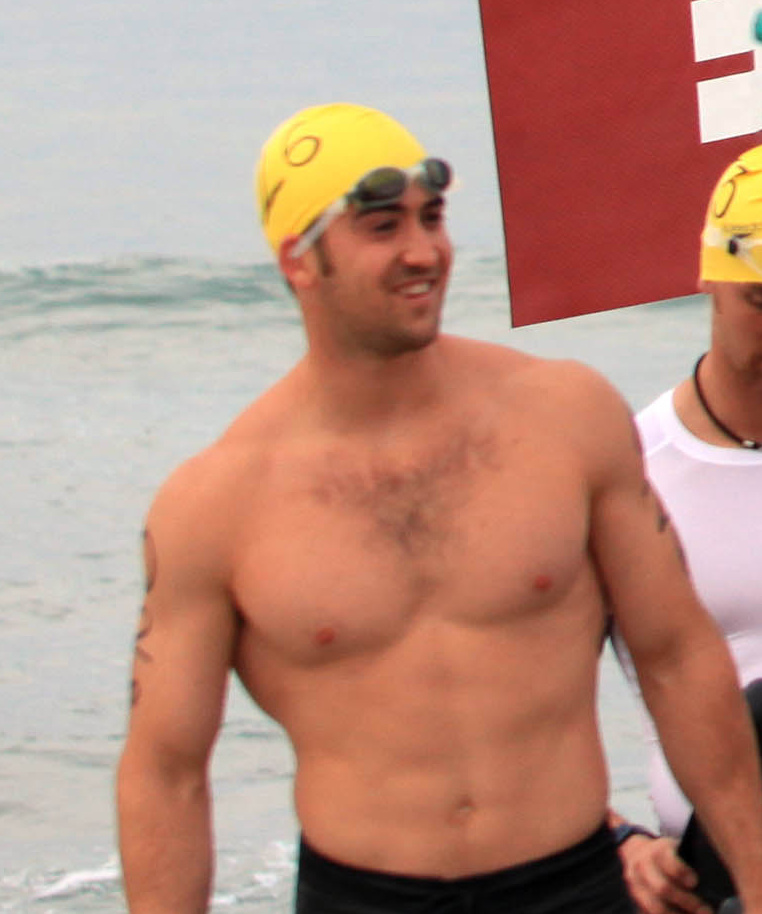
- Ben Smith at the 2012 CrossFit Games

Personal information
- Born: May 16, 1990 (age 36)
- Occupation: CrossFit Athlete
- Height: 5 ft 11 in (1.80 m)
- Weight: 195 lb (88 kg)

Sport
- Sport: CrossFit Games

Achievements and titles
- Personal bests: Clean and Jerk: 335 lb (152 kg); Snatch: 300 lb (140 kg); Deadlift: 540 lb (240 kg); Backsquat:480 lb (220 kg); Press: 185 lb (84 kg)

Ben Smith (born May 16, 1990) is a professional CrossFit athlete from Virginia, United States. He has competed at the CrossFit Games every year from 2009 to 2019, finishing on the podium four times: first place in 2015, second in 2016, and third in 2011 and 2013. He is the first competitor to make ten consecutive appearances in the Individual Division at the CrossFit Games. He was able to extend the streak to 11 years following the adjusted qualification rules for the 2019 CrossFit Games that gave him wildcard invitation.

Smith was a baseball player throughout childhood and was introduced to CrossFit during his senior year of high school in 2008 and qualified for the CrossFit Games the next year. He has placed first in CrossFit Games regional qualifying events six times (five times in the Mid Atlantic region and once in the Atlantic "super-region"). He is the founder of his own gym, CrossFit Krypton, in Chesapeake, Virginia.

== Early life ==
Ben Smith was born to Chuck and Kim Smith on May 16, 1990. He has two younger brothers, Alec and Dane. His father was in the navy and the family moved around frequently when he was younger, but they eventually settled in Chesapeake where he started his 9th grade in high school. Smith learned gymnastics when he was three, lifted weights in his early teens, and played American football and baseball throughout his childhood. He had intended to pursue a career in baseball, and was a baseball player for the Great Bridge High School Wildcats from 2004 to 2008. When he was sixteen, his father introduced him to CrossFit, an exercise program popular in the military and law enforcement communities, to help improve his performance in baseball. He played collegiate level baseball at Lafayette College, but transferred after a semester to Old Dominion University to be closer to home. However, he was unable to try out for the baseball team at Old Dominion after his transfer, and so decided to take part in the Regional, a qualification event for the CrossFit Games, which was held near his home in 2009, and managed to qualify for the Games that year. He graduated with a degree in mechanical engineering in 2012.

== CrossFit career ==
In 2009, Smith entered his first CrossFit Games Regionals event at age 18, finishing in first place at the Mid Atlantic Qualifier held at Virginia Beach, Virginia. He earned a spot in the 2009 CrossFit Games where he finished in 64th place out of 74 competitors. Smith went on to qualify for the Games in 10 subsequent years.

Smith made the podium for the first time at the 2011 Games by finishing third behind Rich Froning and Josh Bridges. In 2013, he was again placed third behind Froning and Jason Khalipa.

At the 2015 Games, following the move to team competition by the four-time Games champion Rich Froning, Mathew Fraser was widely expected to be the winner and he led by a large margin after two days of competition. However, Smith won in two events: Heavy DT at the end of Day 2 and Soccer Chipper in Day 3, with the Soccer Chipper win particularly significant as Fraser faltered in the event and failed to finish, allowing Smith to take over the lead after the event. The contest was tightly fought between Smith and Fraser in subsequent events, and Smith's consistent performance allowed him to fight off Fraser's challenge and prevail at the end to win the title of "Fittest on Earth".

The following year at the 2016 Games, Smith won his final podium spot with a second-place finish after a strong display by the eventual winner Mat Fraser, who went on to dominate the Games for the next four years.

In 2018, Smith became the first CrossFit Games competitor to qualify as an individual for the Games in ten consecutive years, and tied for total individual qualifications. In 2019, Smith failed to qualify through the Open and Sanctionals as he was recovering from a knee surgery he had in January 2019. However, the record for the most consecutive attendances at the Games was extended to 11 when he received a wildcard invite to the Games.

=== Games results ===
Year	Games	Regionals	Open (Worldwide)	
2009	64th	1st (Mid Atlantic Qualifiers)	—	
2010	8th	2nd (Central East)	—	
2011	3rd	1st (Mid Atlantic)	16th	
2012	11th	1st (Mid Atlantic)	24th	
2013	3rd	1st (Mid Atlantic)	11th	
2014	7th	1st (Mid Atlantic)	3rd	
2015	1st	4th (Atlantic)	3rd	
2016	2nd	1st (Atlantic)	65th	
2017	8th	3rd (Atlantic)	41st	
2018	12th	3rd (Atlantic)	40th	
Year	Games	Qualifier	Open (Worldwide)	Open (National)
2019	29th	14th (Rogue); 10th (Granite Games); Received Wildcard Invitation to CrossFit Games	4771st	2248th (Note: Had knee surgery in the offseason and was still recovering during the Open.)
2020	—	8th (Mayhem)	22nd	15th

=== Training and diet ===
Smith followed the CrossFit regimen and its internet community for the program, and posted his garage workout videos posted to online forums. He mostly trained in his garage or outside in his backyard.

As a competitor, Smith maintains a high carbohydrate and protein diet by eating mostly whole foods, although he has not utilized the paleo diet that had been popular in the CrossFit community. The majority of his calories comes from milk, eggs, sweet potatoes, and bacon. He supplements his diet with protein powders. He occasionally breaks the diet on weekends with pizza, ice cream, and burritos.

== Personal life ==
Ben met his wife, Noelle, in their junior year of high school and were married in October 2014. By 2017, Smith had made $487,086 in prize money making him the fifth highest paid CrossFit athlete at the time.

Smith's brothers Alec and Dane also competed in CrossFit, with Alec qualifying for the CrossFit Games in 2017 and 2018. Smith founded his own gym, CrossFit Krypton, in 2013 in Chesapeake. where he is also the lead programmer, co-owner, and coach.
