= 2013 CrossFit Games =

Athletic competition

- Venue: StubHub Center
- Location: Carson, California
- Dates: July 24–28, 2013

Champions
- Men: Rich Froning Jr.
- Women: Samantha Briggs
- Team: Hacks Pack UTE

The 2013 CrossFit Games, the seventh CrossFit Games, were held on July 24–28, 2013, at the StubHub Center in Carson, California. The men's competition was won by Rich Froning Jr., the women's by Samantha Briggs, and the Affiliate Cup by Hacks Pack UTE.

This year 138,000 athletes took part in the Open. The cash prize for the individual winners at the Games increased to $275,000. This is the first year prize money was also awarded to the top three finishers of each event.

== Qualification ==
=== Open ===
In this season, 138,000 registered for the Open to compete for a place in the Regionals of the Games. The Open was held over five weeks from March 6 to April 7, with 5 workouts released for the athletes to complete, one per week. This is the first season where the Open workouts were announced live instead of being pre-recorded. Rich Froning and Samantha Briggs were the respective male and female individual winners of the Open.

=== Regionals ===
The number of qualifiers from the Open who can compete in the Regionals were reduced to 48 men and 48 women per region this year. Qualifiers from the Open proceeded to take part in 7 events in three days in the Regionals; the 17 Regionals were spread over 4 weekends from May 17 through June 9, 2013. Six of these Regionals streamed their events live online. Unlike the preceding season, no athletes were cut during the competition. Three athletes from each Regionals qualified for the Games, apart from the Canadian Regionals (two each), and Asia, Africa and Latin America (one each). The scoring system for the Open and Regionals is the same as previous years (one point for first, two for second, etc.). As with the 2012 season, extra places were given to Regionals where previous champions competed and qualified for the Games. CrossFit Games also exercised its right to offer a place in the Games to athletes who failed to qualify, which this year included past champion Kristan Clever. 47 men, 44 women, 43 teams were invited to the 2013 Games.

== Individual events ==
46 men and 44 women turned up at the 2013 Games to compete. The scoring system used was the same as the 2012 Games', and all events were scored a maximum of 100 points.

=== July 24 ===
==== The Pool ====
10 rounds of: swim 25-yard swim, 3 bar muscle-ups, swim 25-yard swim.

As with the Pendleton events in 2012, The Pool was a surprise addition to the Games, starting on Wednesday two days before the official start date. It was held at the Woollett Aquatic Center, and was the first swimming event to be held at the Games. Jordan Troyan won the men's event, and Michelle Letendre the women's.

==== Row 1 and Row 2 ====
Complete 2000 meters on an indoor rower as fast as possible, and then continue rowing for an additional 19,097 m (half marathon distance) as fast as possible. Jason Khalipa won both the rowing events for the men, Samantha Briggs was first for both the women (Kaleena Ladeairous was joint first for the first row).

=== July 26 ===
==== Burden Run ====
1) Run 2.1 miles; 2) Flip a frame ("pig") end-over-end for 100 yards (pig weight: 490 lb for men and 310 lb for women); 3) Carry a 3-foot-long log 600 yards (log weight: 100 lb for men and 70 lb for women); 4) Drag a sled 66 yards (sled weight: 310 lb for men and 220 lb for women)

==== ZigZag Sprint ====
Sprint 50 yards zigzagging around padded pylons

==== Legless ====
Alternating sets of thrusters (front squat + push press) and no-legs rope climbs with decreasing repetitions each set. Thruster weight: 95 lb for men and 65 lb for women; rope climb height: 15 ft.

=== July 27 ===
==== Naughty Nancy ====
4 rounds 1) run 600m, 2) 25 overhead squats (140 lb for men, 95 lb for women)

==== Clean & Jerk Ladder ====
One clean and jerk every 90 seconds with progressively increasing weight

==== 2007 ====
1000m row, then 5 rounds of 1) 25 pull-ups, 2) 7 push jerks (135 lb for men, 85 lb for women)

=== July 28 ===
==== Sprint Chipper ====
1) 21 GHD situps with a MedBall, 2) 15 snatches (165 lb for men, 100 lb for women), 3) 9 burpees over a 6-foot wall

==== The Cinco 1 ====
3 rounds of 1) 5 deadlifts (405 lb for men, 265 lb for women), 2) 5 weighted pistol squats per leg (53 lb for men, 35 lb for women)

Then, an 80-foot handstand walk

==== The Cinco 2 ====
3 rounds of 1) 5 muscle-ups, 2) 5 deficit handstand pushups

Then, a 90-foot overhead walking lunge (160 lb barbell for men, 100 lb barbell for women)

== Team events ==
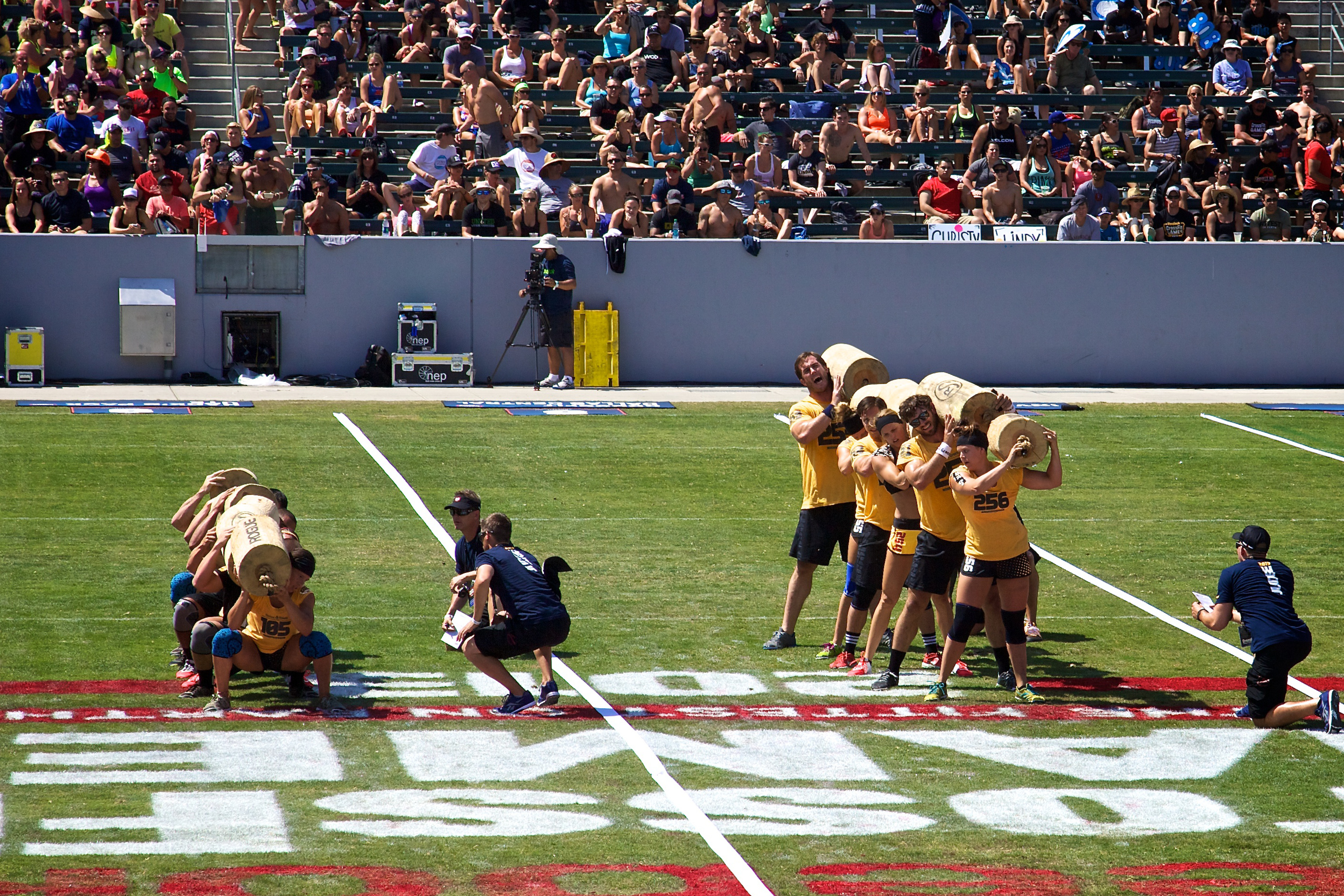
Team Squat Burpee event

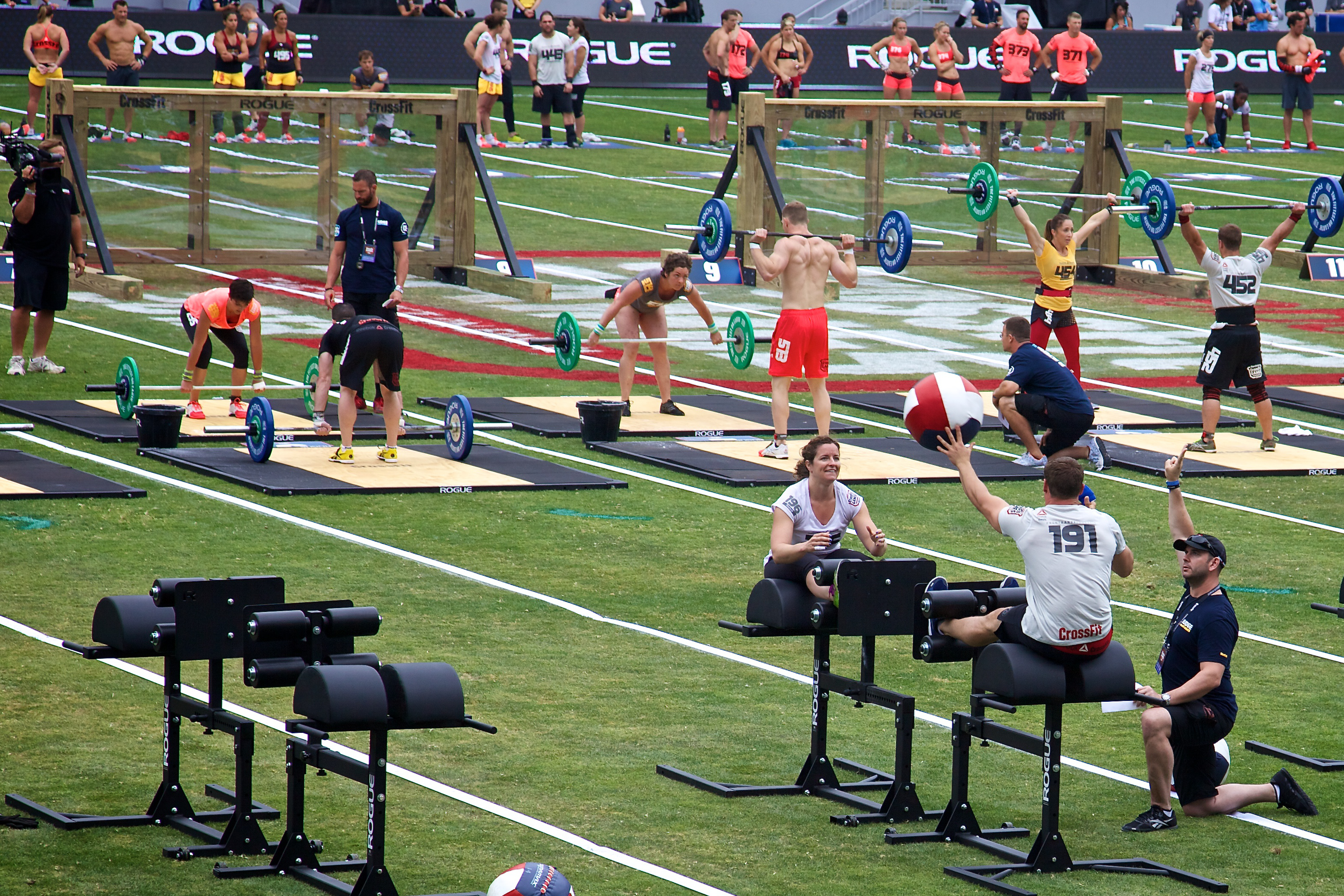
Team Stadium Relay event

Unlike 2011 and 2012 when scores were wiped clean before the final day, scores for all events counted going into the Sunday events. Most events were scored a maximum of 100, except for a few which were scored 50 points (Iditarod 1/2/3).

- Burden Run – 2.1 mile run, women flipped the "Pig" for 50 yards, followed by men who also flipped the "Pig" after adding 4x45 lb. weights, 650 "Worm" carry
- Iditarod 1 – Drag "iditarod" (a weighted sled) for 66 yards, 135 lb. on sled
- Iditarod 2 – 180 lb. on sled
- Iditarod 3 – 225 lb. on sled
- Legless – 3 rounds of thrusters(men 95 lb. / women 65 lb.) and legless rope climb, rep scheme of 15/12/9 for thrusters, 3/2/1 for rope climb
- Squat Burpee – 3 rounds of: 30 squat in unison while carrying a "Worm", and 30 burpees in unison over the "Worm"
- Ascending Chipper 1 – Men – 50 deadlifts (280 lb.), 60 chest-to-bar pull-ups, 70 Cleans (190 lb.), 80 Pull-ups, 90 Snatches (140 lb.), 100 Toes-to-bar
- Ascending Chipper 2 – Women – 50 deadlifts (185 lb.), 60 chest-to-bar pull-ups, 70 Cleans (135 lb.), 80 Pull-ups, 90 Snatches (85 lb.), 100 Toes-to-bar
- Stadium Relay – 500 m run, 25 GHD Ball passes, overhead squat (men 140 lb., women 95 lb.) in unison, 25 Wall burpees, alternating partner
- Final – 120 Handstand push-ups, 40 Worm squat clean and jerks

== Podium finishers ==
=== Individuals and teams ===
| Place | Men | Women | Team |
|---|---|---|---|
| 1st | Rich Froning | Samantha Briggs | Hacks Pack UTE |
| 2nd | Jason Khalipa | Lindsey Valenzuela | CrossFit New England |
| 3rd | Ben Smith | Valerie Voboril | Crossfit Adrenaline |

=== Masters men ===
| Place | 40-44 | 45-49 | 50-54 | 55-59 | 60+ |
|---|---|---|---|---|---|
| 1st | Michael Moseley | Ron Ortiz | Craig Howard | Hilmar Hardarson | Scott Olson |
| 2nd | John Lynch | Gene LaMonica | Steve Parsoneault | Denny Hawkins | Garry Jones |
| 3rd | Brent Maier | Mike Fournier | Brig Edwards | Jon Hults | Gary Marshman |

=== Masters women ===
| Place | 40-44 | 45-49 | 50-54 | 55-59 | 60+ |
|---|---|---|---|---|---|
| 1st | Amanda Allen | Lisa Mikkelsen | Colleen Fahey | Gabriele Schlicht | Sharon Lapkoff |
| 2nd | Becky Conzelman | Tracy Maceachern | Elaine Polito | Lisa Long | Donna Walters |
| 3rd | Merrill Mullis | Kim Holway | Joy Bruening | Anita Eskelinen | Mary Schwing |
