= Jason Khalipa =

American Crossfit athlete

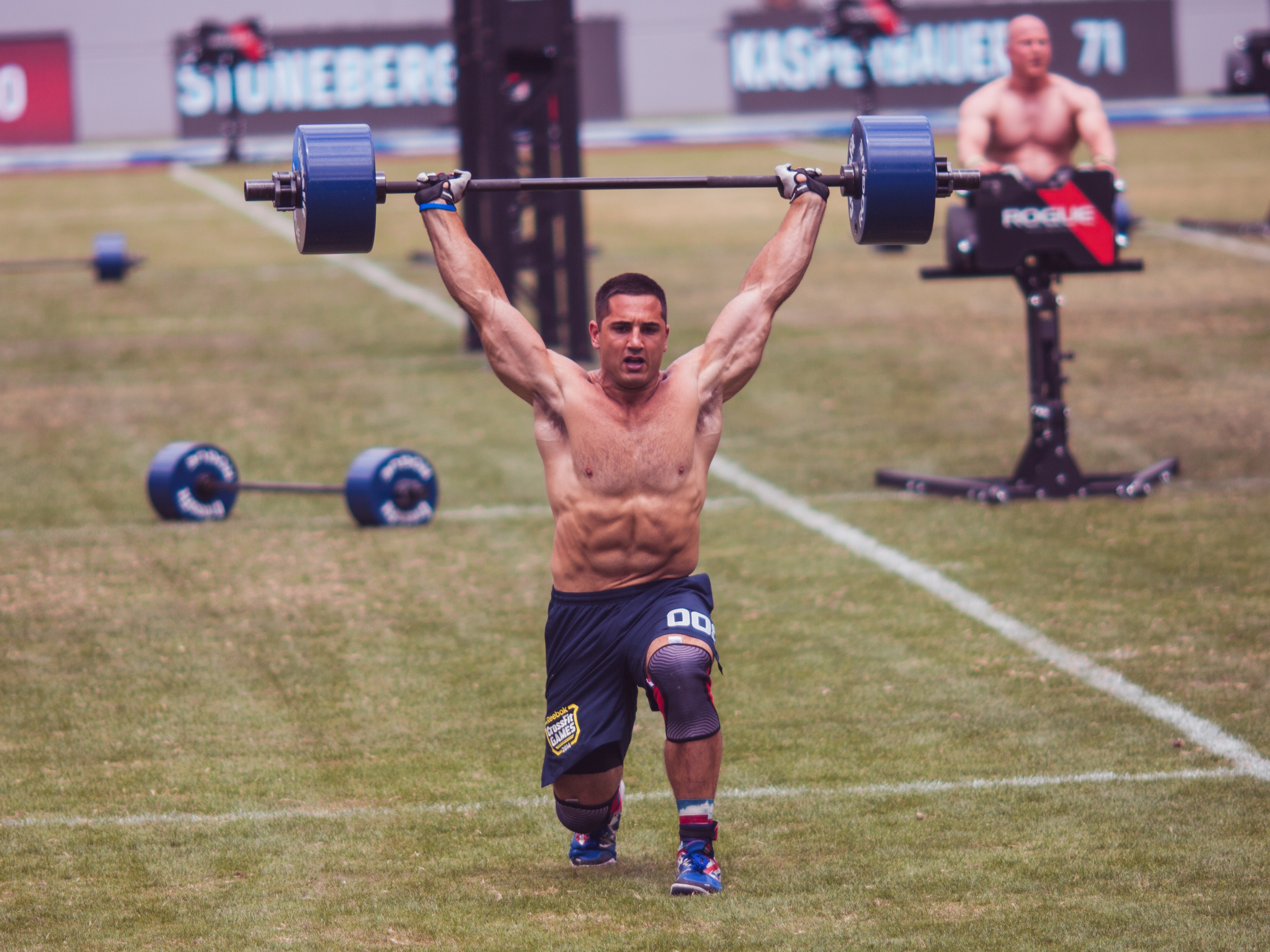
- Khalipa performing an Overhead Walking Lunge while competing at the 2014 Reebok CrossFit Games in Carson, California.

Personal information
- Born: October 2, 1985 (age 40) San Jose, California, U.S.
- Education: Santa Clara University (Business Management)
- Occupation: CrossFit Athlete
- Years active: Individual Competition: 2009–2014; Team Competition: 2015
- Height: 5 ft 10 in (1.78 m)
- Weight: 215 lb (98 kg)
- Spouse: Ashley Khalipa

Sport
- Sport: CrossFit Games

Achievements and titles
- World finals: 2008 CrossFit Games Champion; 2013 CrossFit Games Runner-Up; 2014 CrossFit Games 3rd Place
- Regional finals: 5-times Regionals champion (Individual: 2011, 2012, 2013, 2014. Team: 2015)
- Personal bests: Clean and Jerk: 355 lb (161 kg); Snatch: 285 lb (129 kg); Deadlift: 550 lb (250 kg); Backsquat:450 lb (200 kg)

Jason Khalipa (born October 2, 1985 in San Jose, California) is an American former professional CrossFit Games athlete known for his accomplishments as the 2008 CrossFit Games champion.

He also received the Spirit of the Games award at the 2009 CrossFit Games and was selected to participate as a member of Team USA at the CrossFit Invitational in 2012, 2013, and 2014.

Khalipa is the founder and CEO of NCFit headquartered in Campbell, California.

== Personal life ==
Khalipa was born in San Jose, California, and attended Archbishop Mitty High School where he played for the varsity football team as a nose guard. He also participated in track and field for the shot put event. Khalipa began his fitness career in high school by working part time as the front desk representative at Milpitas Health and Fitness, a gym in Milpitas, California. After high school, he attended college at Santa Clara University in Santa Clara, California, but he did not participate in organized sports. He continued working full-time at Milpitas Health and Fitness where he trained for his first CrossFit Games and devoted the rest of his time on his education, graduating with a Bachelor of Arts in business management. Khalipa opened his first gym, CrossFit Santa Clara nearly a month after winning his first CrossFit Games in 2008. Khalipa's recognition grew in the CrossFit world and wrote As Many Reps As Possible about his career. He became dedicated to learning more about health and fitness as a competitor and a coach. He renamed CrossFit Santa Clara to NorCal CrossFit in 2011 and then renamed again in 2017 to NCFit.

In January 2016, Khalipa's daughter Ava was diagnosed with leukemia. After Ava's final treatment in 2018, Khalipa and his wife Ashley have since focused on spreading awareness for pediatric cancer.

In June 2020, Khalipa announced NCFits disaffiliation from the CrossFit brand, following then-CEO Greg Glassman's controversial posts on Twitter in 2020.

== Athletic career ==
Khalipa competed in eight CrossFit Games competitions throughout his professional career. He won the CrossFit Games in 2008. As the champion of the 2008 CrossFit Games, he automatically qualified in the 2009 CrossFit Games where he placed fifth and earned the Spirit of the Games award. From 2010 to 2015, Khalipa continued to place first in CrossFit Regional events and once during the CrossFit Open, which was a world-wide event, but he did not place first overall in another CrossFit Games. In 2015, he competed as a team member with his affiliate, NorCal CrossFit, in the team competition. He decided not to compete in the 2016 CrossFit Games to take care of his daughter following her diagnoses with leukemia. He briefly participated in the 2017 Open, but withdrew after one event. In 2016, Khalipa began training in Brazilian Jiu Jitsu (BJJ). He placed first in the adult 208lb division of the US Open Brazilian Jiu-Jitsu at the Kaiser Permanente Arena in Santa Cruz, California, on October 23, 2016.

=== Training and diet ===
Khalipa trained three times a day for a competition. The morning workouts usually consist of aerobic training: bike, row, or run. In the afternoon, he engaged in CrossFit and he reserved the evenings for stamina building in complex skills such as handstands, muscle ups, or Olympic lifts. When Khalipa is not training to compete in CrossFit events, he maintains a regular training schedule that includes daily classes at NCFit and Brazilian Jiu Jitsu two to three days a week to maintain conditioning.

His diet differs slightly from when he trained for competitions, which was a gluten-free and mostly paleolithic diet. Khalipa replenishes calories with more food more often by eating meats and vegetables, and he does not keep track of type, volume, or a macronutrient breakdown.

=== CrossFit Games results ===
Year	Games	Regionals	Open (Worldwide)	Notes
2008	1st	—		No Open or Regionals in this season
2009	5th	DNP	—	No Open in this season, instead of Regionals there were Sectionals; As a previous Games champion, Khalipa pre-qualified for the 2009 Games and did not participate in Sectionals; Spirit of the Games winner
2010	16th	DNP	—	No Open in this season As a previous Games champion, Khalipa pre-qualified for the 2010 Games and did not participate in Regionals
2011	7th	1st (Northern California)	11th	
2012	5th	1st (Northern California)	10th	Team USA at CrossFit Invitational
2013	2nd	1st (Northern California)	7th	Team USA at CrossFit Invitational
2014	3rd	1st (Northern California)	2nd	Team USA at CrossFit Invitational
2015; Team	10th	1st (California)	1st (4th Individual)	

== Bibliography ==
- As Many Reps As Possible (2018) ISBN 978-1684019816
