= Julie Foucher =

American CrossFit athlete

Personal information
- Born: December 26, 1988 (age 37)
- Education: University of Michigan
- Occupation: Physician
- Height: 5 ft 4 in (1.63 m)
- Weight: 135 lb (61 kg)
- Website: juliefoucher.com

Sport
- Sport: CrossFit

Achievements and titles
- World finals: 2010 CrossFit Games - 5th 2011 CrossFit Games - 5th 2012 CrossFit Games - 2nd 2014 CrossFit Games - 3rd
- Regional finals: Twice Central East Regional champion (2014, 2012); Twice CrossFit Invitational champion (2014, 2012)
- Personal bests: Clean and Jerk: 195 lb (88 kg); Snatch: 165 lb (75 kg); Deadlift: 310 lb (140 kg); Backsquat:255 lb (116 kg)

Julie Foucher (born December 26, 1988) is an American CrossFit athlete and medical resident. She has competed in the CrossFit Games four times, and has historically been one of the most successful women in the sport. Across her four Games appearances, Foucher has never finished outside the top 5. She has twice finished on the podium, earning 2nd in 2012 and 3rd in 2014. Foucher was a favourite in 2015, but was not able to compete after tearing her Achilles tendon during the season's second qualifying stage.

Foucher works on the CrossFit Level 1 Seminar Staff, and graduated from the Cleveland Clinic Lerner College of Medicine of Case Western Reserve University in 2017.

== CrossFit career ==
Foucher came to CrossFit Ann Arbor / HyperFit USA in the summer of 2009 with a background in high school gymnastics and track and field. At the time, she was pursuing a degree in Biomedical Engineering at the University of Michigan and preparing to apply to medical school.

Within a year of starting CrossFit training under the tutelage of coach Doug Chapman, Foucher qualified for the 2010 CrossFit Games with a second place finish at the 2010 Central East Regional. During her Games debut, Julie Foucher had stand-out performances on "Amanda" (5th place in 8:06 consisting of 9-7-5 repetitions of muscle-ups and 95-lb. snatches) – and the Max Shoulder-to-Overhead (185-lb., 3rd). She would go on to earn 5th overall.

The next year, Foucher moved from Ann Arbor, Michigan, to Cleveland, Ohio, to begin medical school in the fall. That spring, Foucher did not compete in the individual competition at the 2011 Central East Regional. Due to a quirk in the rules that were applied that year, top Games athletes automatically qualified for the 2011 CrossFit Games. So she competed on her affiliate's team instead. With Foucher's help, CrossFit Ann Arbor/HyperFit USA won the team competition at the 2011 Central East Regional, however, the team would go on to compete at the Games without Foucher. Foucher instead competed individually at the 2011 Games, winning the Beach Event at the Santa Monica Pier in 39:04, the fastest of all the women and all but nine of the men. For the second consecutive year, Foucher would finish in 5th overall.

In 2012, Foucher balanced her first year of medical school and her training for the Games. Even with the time constraints, Foucher was able to earn career bests at every stage of the 2012 season starting with a second place finish worldwide in the Open, followed by her first Central East Regional win in the Individual Division, and culminating with a second-place finish at the Games behind then two-time champion Annie Thorisdottir. Like the previous year, Foucher excelled at the long, grueling beach event at the start of the Games. This time, the "triathlon" took place at Marine Corps Base Camp Pendleton where athletes swam 700 meters in the rough ocean, mountain biked 8 km, and then ran 11 km over Microwave Mountain and Foucher finished in 2:05.12 for a first place finish. Her worst performances were 27th place finishes on the 80-lb. medball clean and deficit handstand push-up event and on the clean ladder event and a 29th place finish on the broad jump.

Due to the high demands of the second year of medical school, Foucher chose not to compete in 2013. She was named one of the "Most Interesting People" of 2013 by the Cleveland Magazine.

She returned in 2014 determined to win the title "Fittest on Earth", but the top spot on the podium was the only achievement that had eluded her. She worked with Olympian Dominique Moceanu and Ohio State Gymnast Mike Canales and enlisted the help of other world-renowned coaches.

"One of the areas that we thought we could improve upon is getting a little bit more of that killer instinct," Canales said. "Because she's just a kind, compassionate person. And so, we wanted to make sure she could get that 'smell blood' mentality."

Once again, she won the Central East Regional on her way to the 2014 Games. However, at the Games Foucher was again bested by Annie Thorisdottir (second overall) as well as the new champion, Camille Leblanc-Bazinet.

Her final attempt at the title, in 2015, was cut short by a torn Achilles. Foucher tore her Achilles during an event on the second day of the 2015 Central Regional during Event 3. Appearing devastated in video interviews immediately after the injury, it appeared to be the end of her career. However, later that day, Foucher returned to the competition floor wearing a large black medical boot. As the other athletes ran across the competition floor to begin the 250-ft. handstand walk, Foucher walked with the boot jutted out to the side. Even with the injury, Foucher managed to finish in 2:17 for 11th on the event. She continued on to lift, albeit a small load, in the max snatch (85-lb.), and returned the next day to compete in the final events. She earned a remarkable 8th-place finish on the triplet of rowing, chest-to-bar pull-ups, and strict deficit handstand push-ups, and closed out by completing the 15 muscle-ups of the final event while skipping the 5 cleans that followed.

Foucher is renowned for her work ethic. Michigan-based coach, Doug Chapman, said, "What makes her special is how hard she works."

=== CrossFit Games results ===
Year	Games	Regionals	Open (Worldwide)
2010	5th	2nd (Central East)	—
2011	5th	1st (Central East, team)	5th
2012	2nd	1st (Central East)	2nd
2013	—	—	167th
2014	3rd	1st (Central East)	14th
2015	—	8th (Central)*	11th
2016	—	13th (Central)	133rd
2017; Team	—	18th (Central)	121st (529th Individual)
2018	—	—	879th (Individual)
2019	—	—	1988th (Individual)
2020	—	—	1601st (Individual)

*Foucher tore her Achilles tendon during competition.

== Medical career ==
Foucher is a medical student at the Cleveland Clinic, where she is studying to become a primary care and functional medicine physician. Before she started following CrossFit-style training, she was not interested in becoming a primary care doctor. However, as fitness, nutrition, and exercise became "such a huge part" of her life, as she put it, she realized that she cared more about preventing disease rather than being the last resort for people when they already have disease or they're very sick and need help.

2015 was her last CrossFit Games season; in the future she intends to focus her full attention on her work as a doctor and CrossFit seminar trainer. She says that her ultimate dream is to have a CrossFit affiliate tied to her medical practice, such that there is an open community between both.

In 2017, Foucher matched into residency at Fairview Hospital of the Cleveland Clinic, specializing in Family Medicine.
