= Rich Froning Jr. =

American CrossFit athlete

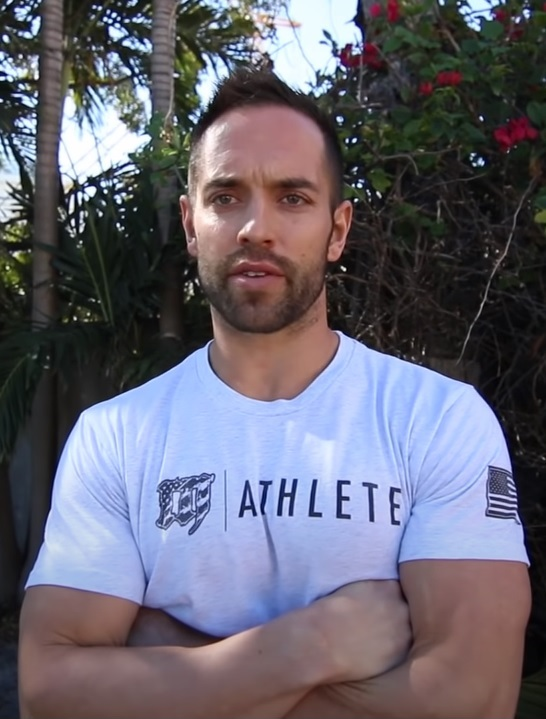
- Rich Froning at Wodapalooza in 2019

Personal information
- Full name: Richard Froning Jr.
- Born: July 21, 1987 (age 39) Mount Clemens, Michigan, U.S.
- Home town: Cookeville, Tennessee, U.S.
- Education: Tennessee Tech (Exercise Science)
- Occupation: CrossFit Athlete
- Years active: Individual Competition: 2010–2014; Team Competition: 2015–present
- Height: 5 ft 9 in (1.75 m)
- Weight: 195 lb (88 kg)
- Spouse: Hillary Froning

Sport
- Sport: CrossFit
- Partners: Dan Bailey, Darren Hunsucker, Thomas Cox, James Hobart, Matt Hewett, Tyler Goodman, Josh Blake

Achievements and titles
- World finals: 2010 CrossFit Games Runner-Up; 2011 CrossFit Games Champion; 2012 CrossFit Games Champion; 2013 CrossFit Games Champion; 2014 CrossFit Games Champion; 2015 CrossFit Games Affiliate Cup Champion; 2016 CrossFit Games Affiliate Cup Champion; 2017 CrossFit Games Affiliate Cup Runner-Up; 2018 CrossFit Games Affiliate Cup Champion; 2019 CrossFit Games Team Champion; 2021 CrossFit Games Team Champion; 2022 CrossFit Games Team Champion
- Regional finals: 5-times Regional champion (2010, 2012, 2013, 2014, 2015); 3-times Open worldwide champion (2012, 2013, 2014)
- Personal bests: Clean and Jerk: 380 lb (170 kg); Snatch: 306 lb (139 kg); Deadlift: 570 lb (260 kg); Backsquat:475 lb (215 kg)

Richard Froning Jr. (born July 21, 1987) is an American professional CrossFit athlete known for his achievements participating in the CrossFit Games. He became the first person to win the CrossFit Games title of "Fittest Man on Earth" four times with his first-place finish in the 2011, 2012, 2013, and 2014 CrossFit Games. He retired from individual competitions after 2014, and led a team from CrossFit Mayhem to first-place finishes in the Team category in 2015, 2016, 2018, 2019, 2021, and 2022, at the CrossFit Games.

In addition to making a living off CrossFit, Froning has won over $1,050,000 in prize money from winning the CrossFit Games four times. Additionally, he has accumulated significant sponsorships from brands like Reebok, Oakley, and Rogue Fitness. In early 2015, Reebok released a shoe designed, in part, by Froning.

Froning owns and operates the affiliate gym CrossFit Mayhem, located in Cookeville, Tennessee, and is a member of the CrossFit Level 1 Seminar Staff.

== Early life ==
Froning was born in Mount Clemens, Michigan. He moved to Cookeville, Tennessee, where he currently resides. There he attended Cookeville High School where he played baseball and was an all-district, all-region second baseman. He also participated in football. Upon graduating in 2005, Froning received a baseball scholarship to Walters State Community College. Soon after, Froning decided to end his baseball career, and began working at the Cookeville Fire Department, while continuing his studies at Tennessee Tech. Froning was introduced to CrossFit by one of his professors at Tennessee Tech in 2009, and he soon developed a passion for CrossFit and started doing CrossFit workouts in his barn. In 2010, he began coaching and competing.

== Professional career ==
Froning has competed at the CrossFit Games since 2010. Froning qualified for the 2010 Southeast Regional competition through the Sectional Qualifiers, a precursor to the online-based Open. Froning won the Regional, thereby qualifying for the fourth CrossFit Games at the Home Depot Center in Carson, California.

At the 2010 Games, Froning earned five top 5 finishes including two event wins, and never dropped below 19th. He was leading heading into the final event, however the rope climb portion of the final event exposed "a chink in his armor" in terms of technique. Froning did not use his legs and feet to wrap round the rope, and attempted the rope climbs only using his arms. Fatigued, Froning fell from the rope multiple times. His 12th-place finish on the final event opened up the space necessary for Graham Holmberg to move up to the top spot. The 2010 Games podium had Holmberg in first, Froning in second, and Chris Spealler in third.

In 2011, Froning had a poor start at the Games in the Beach event that featured the first ever ocean swim, but performed consistently well in most of the other events, winning three events, including the event that featured rope-climbing, and placed second in three further events. He topped the leaderboard with nearly a hundred points better than second place Josh Bridges, thereby winning his first CrossFit Games title.

Froning followed the 2011 Games win by winning every stage of the 2012-2014 Games season including the worldwide Open, Regionals, and the Games. That winning streak lasted until he retired from Individual Competition.

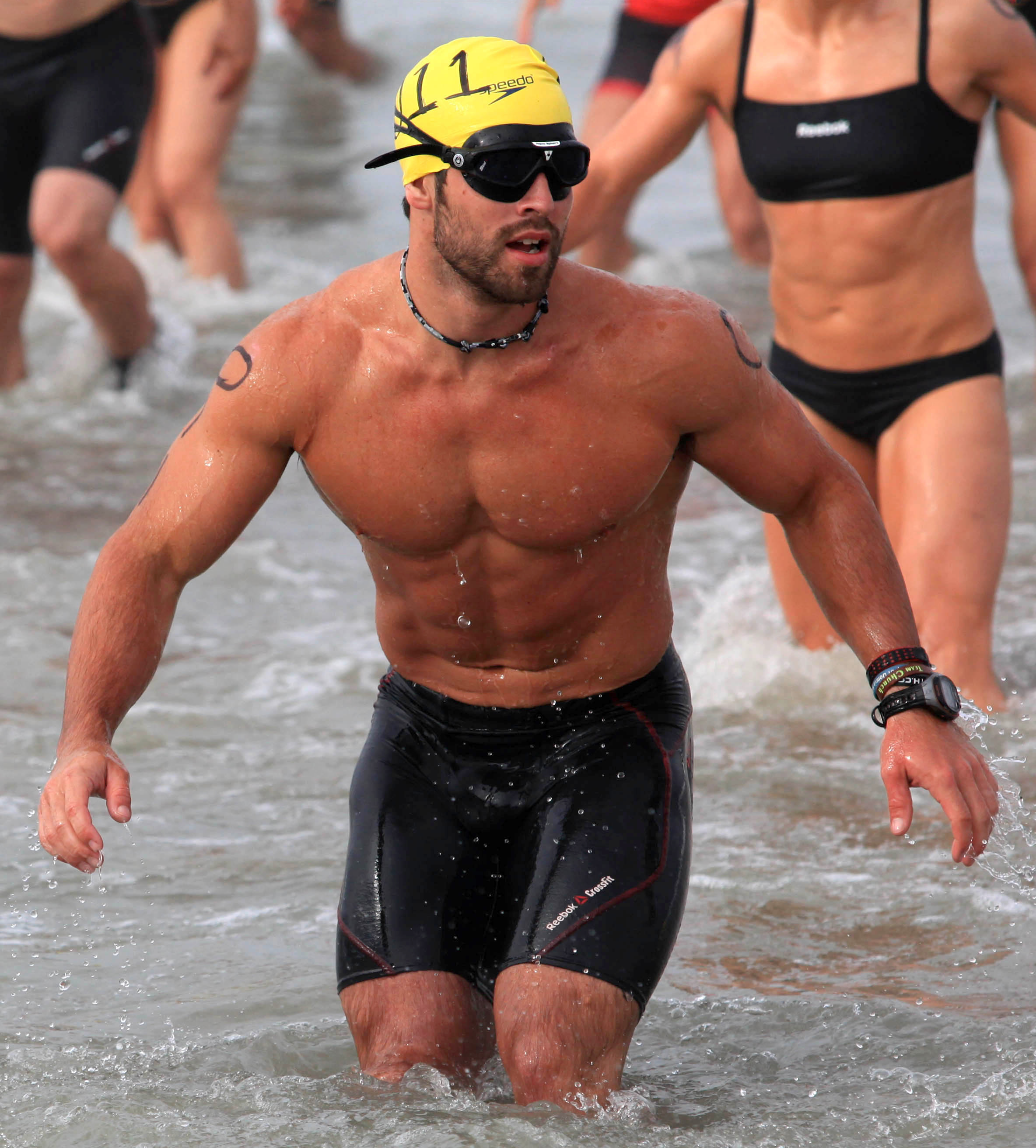
Froning competing at the 2012 CrossFit Games

In the 2012 Games, Froning won three of the events (Chipper, Elizabeth, and Isabel), beating second-place Matt Chan to win again this year. Both Froning and the winner of the women's competition Annie Thorisdottir were the first athletes to win the CrossFit Games twice.

In 2013, Froning again started poorly in the swimming event, finishing in 30th place. However, he performed well in most of the other events, and won the last three. He topped the leaderboard, beating Jason Khalipa to win for the third time, thereby becoming the first ever three time winner of the Games.

At the 2014 Games, Froning faced a strong challenge from newcomer Mat Fraser. He struggled in the heat in the Triple-3 event, and had to walk part of the run course. At 37th place, it was his worst-ever finish in a CrossFit Games event. However, he finished strongly with three consecutive event wins in the final day to win a record fourth consecutive title. Froning retired from individual competition after this Games. He set the standard for the "Fittest Man on Earth" with his four consecutive CrossFit Games. In a documentary released in the summer of 2015, "Froning," documentary filmmakers from CrossFit, Inc., said that Froning was the Fittest Man in History.

In each of the years since, Froning has qualified for Regionals as an individual; however, he chose to participate in the team competition instead, as part of the "Mayhem Freedom" team.

Froning has said "It's not necessarily that I like to win, but I hate losing more."

=== CrossFit Mayhem ===
Froning started competing as part of the CrossFit Mayhem/CrossFit Mayhem Freedom team in 2015 after he retired from individual competitions at the Games. He has been a constant in the team since 2015, although other members of the team have changed through the years. The team has won all the team competitions at the Games from 2015 to 2022 apart from 2017 when it came second, and 2020 when no team competition was held.

Froning announced that he would retire from team competition in October 2022 after winning his sixth CrossFit Games team titles.

=== CrossFit Games results ===
Year	Division	Games	Regionals		Open (worldwide)
2010	Individual	2nd	1st		—
2011	Individual	1st	8th (Team, Central East)*		3rd
2012	Individual	1st	1st (Central East)		1st
2013	Individual	1st	1st (Central East)		1st
2014	Individual	1st	1st (Central East)		1st
2015	Team	1st	1st (Central)		4th (2nd Individual)
2016	Team	1st	1st (Central)		3rd (2nd Individual)
2017	Team	2nd	1st (Central)		4th (11th Individual)
2018	Team	1st	1st (Central)		3rd (10th Individual)
Year	Division	Games	Qualifier		Open (Individual only)
2019	Team	1st	5th (Wodapalooza); 1st (Asia); 3rd (Rogue)		10th (world); 5th (United States)
2020	Team	—N/a	1st (SiD); 1st (WZA)		19th (world); 8th (United States)
Year	Division	Games	Semifinal	Quarterfinal	Open (Individual only)
2021	Team	1st	1st (MACC)	1st (North America)	5th (world); 4th (United States)
2022	Team	1st	1st (MACC)	1st (North America)	2nd (world); 1st (United States)

*As the 2010 runner-up, Froning was prequalified to compete as an individual in 2011

== Diet and training ==
Froning does not adhere to the Paleolithic diet or Zone diet, both of which are popular in the CrossFit community. He states that he does not adhere to a specific diet plan, and does not count his calorie intake. He eats large amounts of peanut butter and drinks whole milk, both of which are not compliant with Paleo standards. During the day he typically does not eat an excessive amount, instead eating a large meal at night and drinking multiple Advocare protein shakes, combined with berries, almond milk, and peanut butter.

He reports working out multiple times a day and, unlike other athletes, prefers not to take days off from training. Froning does not have a coach or programmer who writes his workouts. Instead, he often finds an exceptional athlete to be his training partner, such as Games athletes Dan Bailey and James Hobart. Froning utilizes regulated breathing exercises to help control his heart rate, and trains using a specialized mouthpiece designed to maximize the opening of the wearer's breathing passages.

Some of Froning's methods are discussed in his 2013 memoir, First: What It Takes to Win.

== Personal life ==
Froning is a Christian. He has a tattoo on his side, that says "Galatians 6:14". Rich and his wife, Hillary, have adopted two daughters and a son.

== Bibliography ==
- First: What It Takes to Win (2013) ISBN 978-1414386782
- Froning: The Fittest Man in History (2015)
