= 2014 CrossFit Games =

Athletic competition

- Venue: StubHub Center
- Location: Carson, California
- Dates: July 22–27, 2014

Champions
- Men: Rich Froning Jr.
- Women: Camille Leblanc-Bazinet
- Team: CrossFit Invictus

The 2014 CrossFit Games were held on July 22–27, 2014 at the StubHub Center in Carson, California, and were the eighth edition of the Games. The CrossFit Games are an annual competition to determine the "Fittest on Earth" and feature workouts designed using the CrossFit program. Rich Froning Jr. was the men's winner, while Camille Leblanc-Bazinet of Canada won the women's event, and CrossFit Invictus won the Affiliate Cup.

This year's Games were tightly contested after Rich Froning Jr. who started well faltered in a few events. He finished strongly with three straight event wins in the final day to clinch a record fourth consecutive title. He retired from individual competition after this Games, concentrating instead on the team events in the following seasons. This year also featured the debut of Mat Fraser who finished second and was named Rookie of Year at the Games.

ESPN aired the final heat of the evening event on both Friday and Saturday. ESPN2 aired the final heat of the final event on Sunday evening. All of the events were available live on ESPN3 for U.S. viewers and on the CrossFit Games website for international viewers.

== Qualification ==
The 2014 CrossFit Games Open was held over the course of five weeks in February and March and it had 209,585 participants, an event record. The Open was again won by the reigning champions Rich Froning and Sam Briggs.

=== Regionals ===
The top 48 men, 48 women, and 36 teams across the five Open workouts from each of the 17 regions proceeded to participate in a three-day Regional competition. There were 7 workouts in each of the Regionals. The top three men, women, and teams from each of the Regionals in the United States, Europe, and Australia advanced to the CrossFit Games; in smaller Regionals only one or two top athletes may qualify. The extra qualification places given to Regionals where past Champions competed in and qualified to the Games were removed this season. The 2013 champion Sam Briggs failed to qualify for the Games after performing poorly in the handstand walk event.

Drug testing was extended starting this year to any registered CrossFit competitor including offseason testing, in previous seasons only the top athletes at the Regionals and the Games were tested.

== Individual events ==
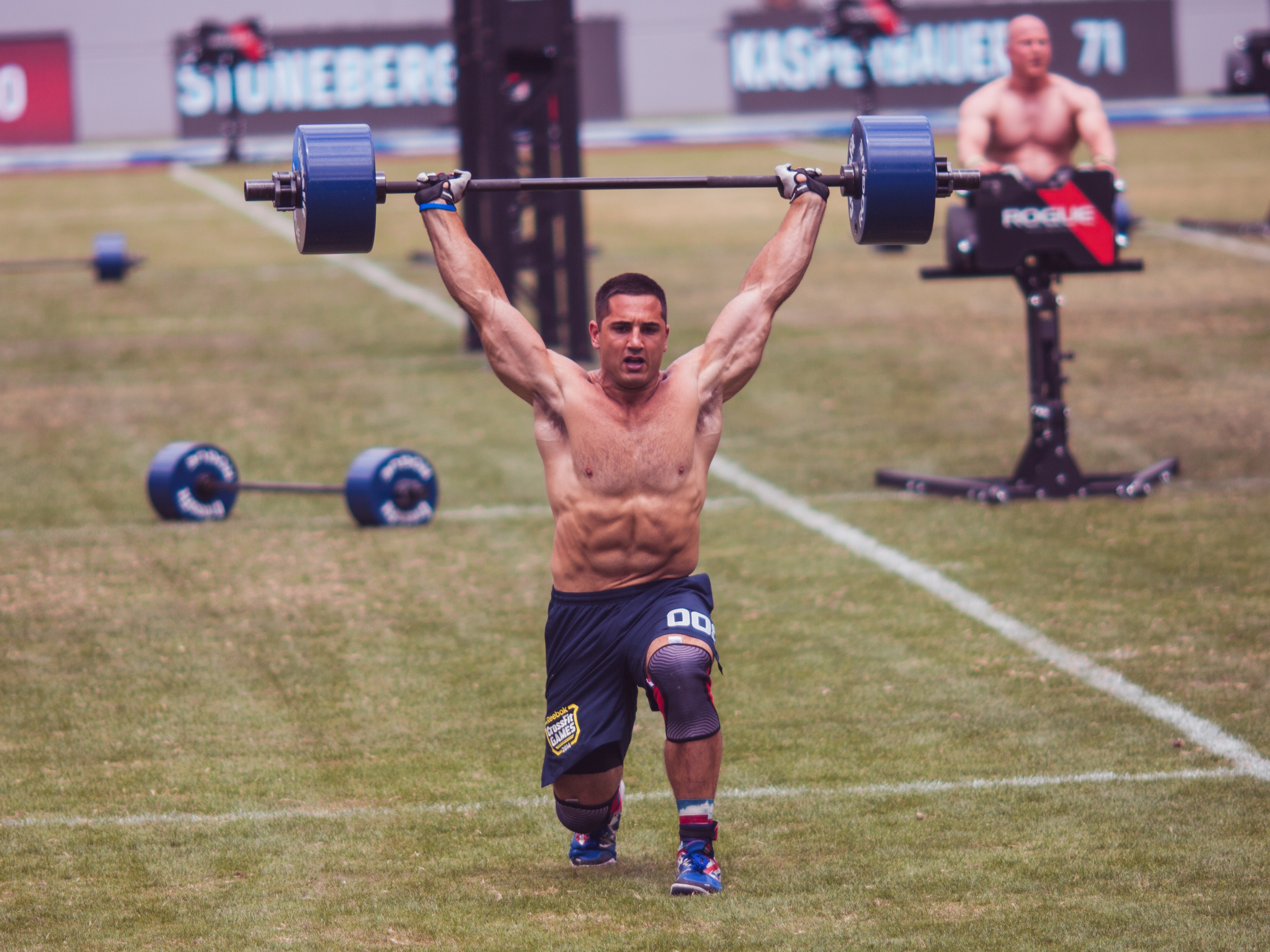
Jason Khalipa at the 2014 CrossFit Games in the Midline March event

The men and women compete against only their own gender but compete in the same events (with various elements scaled down for the women, such as barbell weight). As the events change from year to year, the athletes must prepare for a variety of individual events. To follow with CrossFit's theme of being "prepared for anything", a number of new movements are often introduced each year. Events are not announced until after the Regionals are over, with many events being announced days, hours, or only minutes in advance. In fact, this year's final event, Double Grace, was announced to the athletes only 30 seconds before the event started.

=== Wednesday, July 23, 2014 ===
==== Event 1: The Beach ====
For the third straight year, the CrossFit Games began on the Wednesday before the traditional weekend events; however, the athletes were aware of this much further in advance than in the past. The Games have started with a swim every year since 2011, with this year's event consisting of 1,000 yards of swimming, much longer than in past years. The event consisted of three separate sections of open-water swimming (250 yards, 500 yards, 250 yards), between which are the competitors had to perform two sessions of 50 kettlebell thrusters (35 lb. for men / 24 lb. for women)and 30 burpees in the sand. The event took place on Hermosa Beach.

Jordan Troyan, an experienced swimmer, won the first event for the men just as he had the previous year. Anna Tunnicliffe won the event for the women.

==== Event 2: Overhead Squat ====
The athletes had three attempts to establish a 1-rep maximum overhead squat. The athletes had their choice of weight and were allowed to advance upwards in increments as small as one pound. Should they miss an attempt, they were not permitted to lower their weight, but they were permitted to increase their weight if they desired.

Kara Webb won the women's event with a 250 lb squat, putting her in first place. Rich Froning and Mathew Fraser each squatted 377 lb, tying for first. Froning took the lead in the competition after this event. Jordan Troyan, who won the previous event, was the only athlete to fail all three attempts.

Per the CrossFit tradition of three days on, one day off, there were no events on Thursday. Wanda Brenton withdrew after this event.

=== Friday, July 25, 2014 ===
==== Event 3: Triple-3 ====
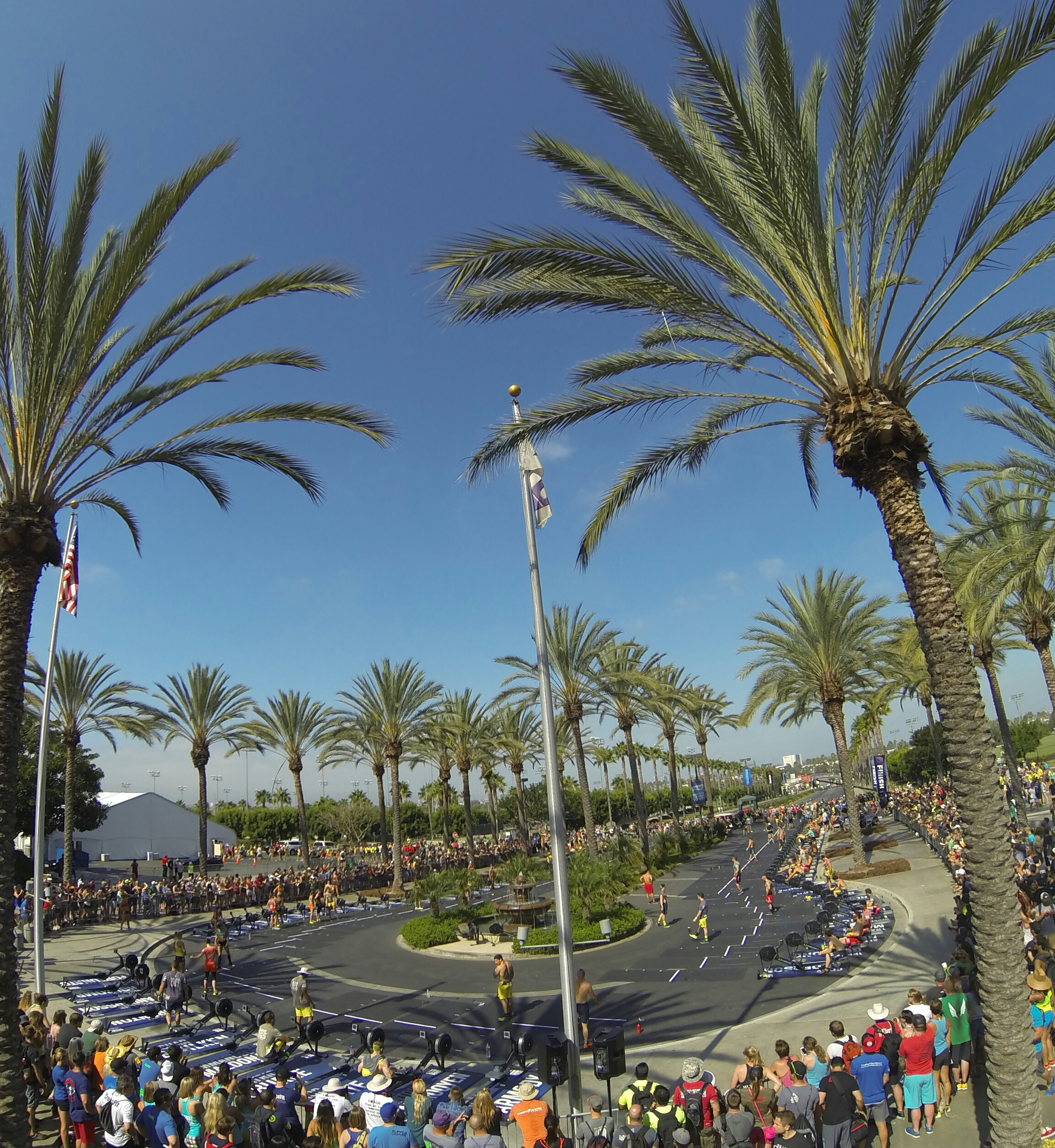
Athletes and rowing machines at the start of the 3 mile run race course in the Triple-3 event

Similar to 2013's Burden Run event, all male and female athletes participated in one large heat. The athletes completed a triplet consisting of a 3,000 meter row, 300 double-unders, and a 3 mile run around the StubHub Center. Rob Forte and Kristen Holte were the men's and women's winners, respectively. Rich Froning had to stop and walked part of the run course in the heat, and finished in 37th place, his worst-ever finish in a CrossFit Games event.

==== Events 4 and 5: Sprint Sled 1 and 2 ====
Two 50-point events were held back-to-back, requiring the athlete to push a 90 lb sled across the soccer stadium. Lauren Brooks and Emily Abbott won the first and second event for the women, respectively, while Neal Maddox won both events for the men.

==== Event 6: 21-15-9 Complex ====
Similar to many CrossFit benchmark workouts, this event was held in a 21-15-9 rep scheme with two sections. However, within each section, there were three movements. The first section consisted of deadlifts, cleans, and snatches of a 155 lb (115 lb for the women) barbell. The second section consisted of pull-ups, chest-to-bar pull-ups, and bar muscle-ups. Rich Froning took first place for the men's event, which pulled him up to fourth place overall after poor results in the previous three events. Camille Leblanc-Bazinet won the women's event as the only competitor who went through the pull-up sequences unbroken.

=== Saturday, July 26, 2014 ===
==== Event 7: Muscle-Up Biathlon ====
The Muscle-Up Biathlon was the first event announced, but the details were unknown to the competitors until a few days before the event. Similar to a biathlon, athletes completed 3 rounds of two alternating movements: a 400 meter run and muscle-ups, with the first round requiring 18 muscle-ups and the second and third rounds requiring 15 and 12, respectively. To further the biathlon theme, each time an athlete dropped from their set of rings, they had to complete a 200 meter "penalty lap".

==== Event 8: Sprint Carry ====
In this event, the athletes completed three down-and-back 100-meter runs in a shuttle-run format. Each time an athlete came back down the floor, they were required to carry an increasingly heavy object.

==== Event 9: Clean-Speed Ladder ====
As in past years, a "ladder" event was held at this year's Games. In past years, athletes had a set amount of time to lift one weight before ascending to the next weight in set time periods, usually 30 or 60 seconds. This year, however, the event was for time. In the quarterfinals, athletes had to squat clean 5 ascending weights, with the top 24 athletes advancing to the semifinals. In the semifinals, the weights were increased in typical ladder fashion, with the top 8 athletes advancing to the finals (and the process repeating). The athletes were scored based on their time in their final round; for instance, 9th place was the fastest time in the semifinals that did not advance to the finals. Times were not cumulative.

==== Event 10: Push Pull ====
Competitors completed four rounds of handstand push-ups and sled pulls. Each round, the reps and deficit for the handstand push-ups increased and the sled pulls got heavier.

=== Sunday, July 27, 2014 ===
==== Event 11: Midline March ====
Athletes completed three rounds of 25 GHD sit-ups, a 50 foot handstand walk, and a 50 foot overhead walking lunge. Kara Webb had difficulty with the handstand walk, later withdrew due to injury in this event. Annie Thorisdottir won the women's event to start her charge up the leader's board. Rich Froning won in the men's event, the first of his three wins on the final day.

==== Event 12: Thick 'n Quick ====
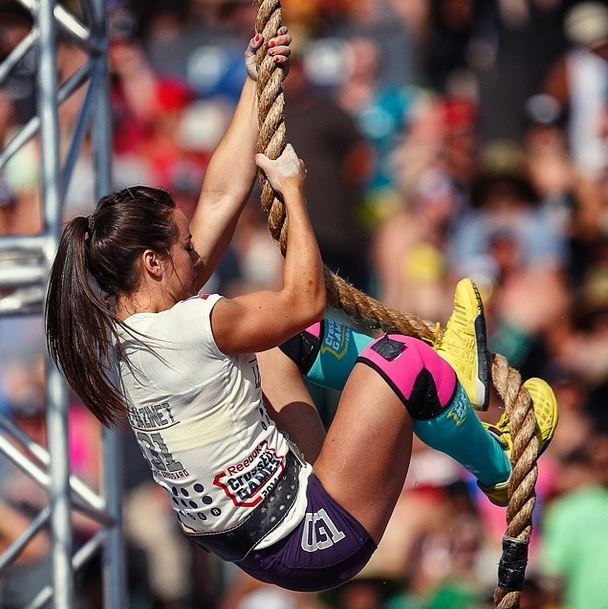
Camille Leblanc-Bazinet, during the Thick 'n Quick event.

Inspired by the final event of the Regionals, athletes completed 4 rope climbs at 20' each on a thicker rope, followed by 3 overhead squats at 245 lb for the men, 165 lb for the women. Jenn Jones won the event for the women, while Rich Froning won for the men. The win was Froning's fifth consecutive Sunday event win, dating back to 2013. Kara Webb, who had led in the early events of the Games until she was overtaken by Leblanc-Bazinet, had to withdraw due to injury.

==== Event 13: Double Grace ====
Competitors learned about this event just seconds before it began, with competitors in later heats being secluded in order to maintain the surprise. Grace, a classic CrossFit workout and the final workout of the 2008 CrossFit Games, was doubled for this event. Athletes completed 60 clean and jerks at 135 lb for the men and 95 lb for the women.

2011 and 2012 champion Annie Thorisdottir won the event for the women, clinching second place overall as Camille Leblanc-Bazinet finished fifth, which secured her first ever CrossFit Games championship.

For the second straight year, Rich Froning swept all three Sunday events with a win in Double Grace. The win secured his fourth consecutive CrossFit Games championship.

== Team events ==
The first team event was held on a Wednesday for the first time, which is also the first ever swim event for the team competition.

- The Beach
- Relay Run
- Fantasy Land
- Big Bob 100
- Deadlift-M
- Deadlift-W
- Big Bob 200
- Chipper-M
- Chipper-F
- Squat Burpee
- Worm Sprint
- Team Fifties
- Worm Bob Final

== Podium finishers ==
=== Individuals and teams ===
Place	Men	Women	Team
1st	Rich Froning Jr.	Camille Leblanc-Bazinet	CrossFit Invictus
2nd	Mat Fraser	Annie Thorisdottir	CrossFit Conjugate
3rd	Jason Khalipa	Julie Foucher	CrossFit Marysville

=== Masters men ===
Place	40-44	45-49	50-54	55-59	60+
1st	Shawn Ramirez	Jerry Hill	Will Powell	Steve Hamming	Scott Olson
2nd	Jerome Perryman	Jeff Tincher	Brig Edwards	Tom Clark	Stephen Angove
3rd	Bryan Wadkins	Karl Dyall	Joey Lochner	Marco Arrendondo	Thomas Ackerman

=== Masters women ===
Place	40-44	45-49	50-54	55-59	60+
1st	Amanda Allen	Kim Holway	Mary Beth Litsheim	Susan Clarke	Karen Wattier
2nd	Cheryl Brost	Karen McCune	Cindy Kelly	Kathy Ehrsam	Mary Schwing
3rd	Marcie Wells	Shellie Edington	Kelli Dean	Patty Failla	Sharon Lapkoff

== See also ==
- CrossFit
