= 2011 CrossFit Games =

Athletic competition

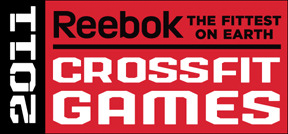
- Venue: Home Depot Center
- Location: Carson, California
- Dates: July 29–31, 2011

Champions
- Men: Rich Froning Jr.
- Women: Annie Thorisdottir
- Team: CrossFit New England

The 2011 CrossFit Games were a sporting event, the fifth CrossFit Games, held on July 29–31, 2011, at the Home Depot Center in Carson, California. The winners of the Games were Rich Froning for the men's competition and Annie Thorisdottir for the women, who were both runners-up the previous year. CrossFit New England won the team competition.

2011 marked the first year the "CrossFit Open" was used as the first part of a two-stage qualification process for the CrossFit Games. Online submissions of workout results were invited from competitors worldwide, and over 26,000 participated. Athletes were then selected to compete in the Regionals, and those who qualified then proceeded to the CrossFit Games. There were 10 events in the Games, including the first swim event which was held outside the main venue for the first time. Also starting this season, the Games settled on a scoring system of 100 points for the winner of an event, with decreasing number of points for lower-placed athletes, and the one with the most points at the end of the competition would be the champion.

CrossFit started a 10-year, $150 million, sponsorship and partnership deal with Reebok in 2011, and the prize money for the male and female individual winners of the Games increased substantially to $250,000 this year. The 2011 Games were also the first to be covered by ESPN, with live coverage streamed through ESPN3 as well as late shows on ESPN2, and the exposure further increased the popularity of subsequent Games.

== Qualification ==
=== Open ===
2011 was the first year the Open was implemented as part of the qualification process in a CrossFit season. It replaced the Sectionals of 2010. Over 26,000 athletes participated the Open, which took place in six weeks from March 15 to May 1, 2011. Competing athletes participated in six workouts, with each workout released to be completed weekly. Athletes can submit their scores online either with video evidence or validation by judges in a CrossFit affiliate. Annie Thorisdottir and Dan Bailey were the respective female and male individual winners of the Open.

The point system used in both the Open was the same as that used for the Games last year, with points awarded directly corresponding to the rankings (1 point for first, 2 points for second, etc.). For teams, the combined scores of the individuals from a single gym were used to rank a team. Scoring for the Open stayed the same for all subsequent seasons.

=== Regionals ===
In each of the 17 regions, 60 individual athletes and 30 teams with the best results proceeded to compete in the Regionals. The Regionals were held over three days from May 27 to June 19, 2011. The workouts for the Regionals were standardized this year, and all athletes had to compete in the same six events to determine the qualifiers for the CrossFit Games. The scoring system for the Regionals was the same as the Open. A minimum work requirement was introduced for a Regional event for the first time. Failure by an athlete to complete a certain movement, for example, a single handstand push-up in the first event, would result in elimination.

In each Regional, the competing athletes were first cut to 14 men, 14 women, and 10 team after four events before proceeding to compete in the last two events. The number of qualifiers for the Games varied for each of the Regional competitions, but no more than three men and three women may qualify from each Regional. This is also the last Games where special invites were offered to the top 5 men and women of the preceding Games and winners of earlier Games. A total of 49 male and 47 female qualifiers went on to compete in the Games. Starting this year, CrossFit awarded prize money to all who qualified from the Regionals to the Games.

== Individual events ==
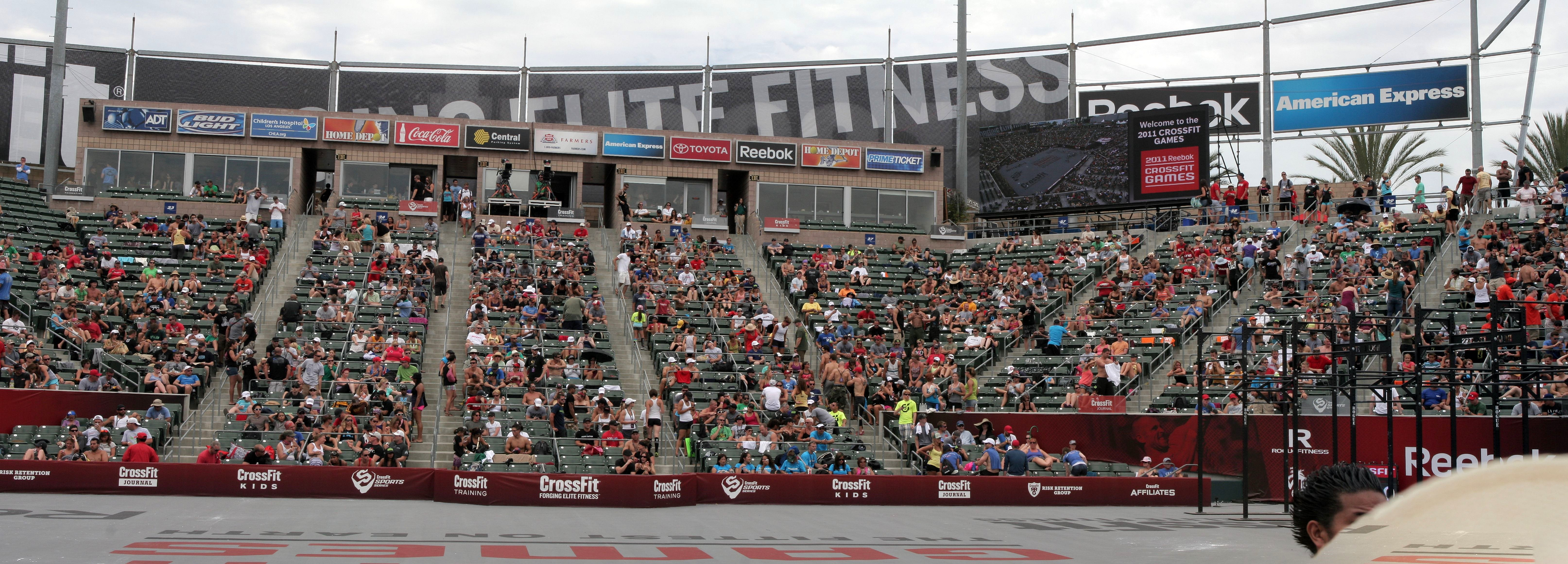
Spectators at the Tennis Stadium, Home Depot Center for the 2011 CrossFit Games

The 2011 CrossFit Games featured the first event to be held outside of the main venue, which is the Beach event held on the beach at Santa Monica Pier. This was also the first swim event to be introduced at the Games. 10 events were held in total, the other 9 events were held at the various stadiums of Home Depot Center. The number of athletes were cut to 35 men and 35 women after the 6th event, 24 after the 7th, with 12 competing in the final event.

The point system was modified for the Games this year. Unlike the Open and Regionals, a scoring table was used for the Games: the winner of each event earned 100 points, each lower-ranked athlete until the 6th place gained 5 fewer points than the one higher up, and from 7th to 30th place the points dropped by 2 points every place, after which the points decrease by 1 point each.

=== July 29, 2011 ===
- The Beach – 210 meters ocean swim; 1,500 meters run on beach; 50 chest-to-bar pull up; 100 push ups; 200 squats; ending with a 1,500 meters beach run. The winners of the event were Josh Bridges for the men, Julie Foucher for the women. The 2009 champion Mikko Salo had to withdraw from the Games after bursting his eardrum in the swim.

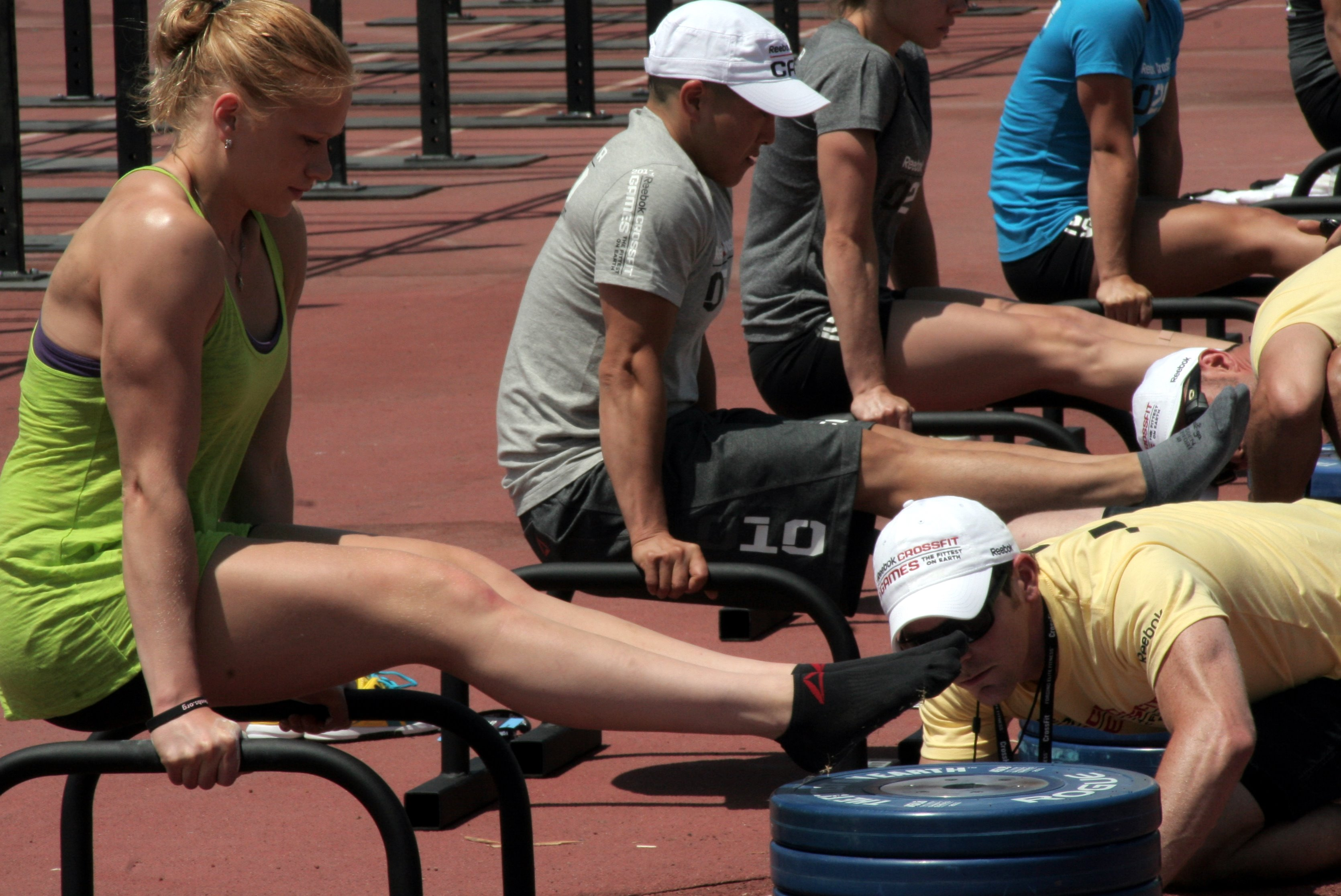
L sit hold

- Skill 1 – L sit hold, handstand walk, softball throw
- Rope–Clean – 5 rounds of: 15-foot Rope climb (5 ascents for first round, decreasing by one for every subsequent round), Clean and jerks (145-lb. for men 115-lb. for women, 20 lb. increase for men and 10 lb. increase for women in each round), 5 reps in first round, decreasing by one rep in each subsequent round. Froning won the event this year after struggling in the rope-climb event the previous year.

=== July 30, 2011 ===
- Triplet Sprint – 4 rounds of 5 Muscle-ups, 10 reps of Deadlifts (245-lb.for men, 165-lb. for women), 15 GHD Sit-ups, Sprint (50 yards in first round, increasing by 50 yards in each of the subsequent rounds)
- Skill 2 – Three separate tests: 1-rep-max weighted Chest-to-bar pull-up (in 2 minutes), 1-rep-max Snatch (2 minutes), Weighted-water jug carry (60 seconds). Athletes are ranked separately in each test, with the sum of their 3 rankings determine score for the event.
- Killer Kage – 3 rounds of 7 rep Front squats (225-lb. for men, 155-lb. for women), Bike 700 meters, 100-foot Monkey bar traverse

=== July 31, 2011 ===
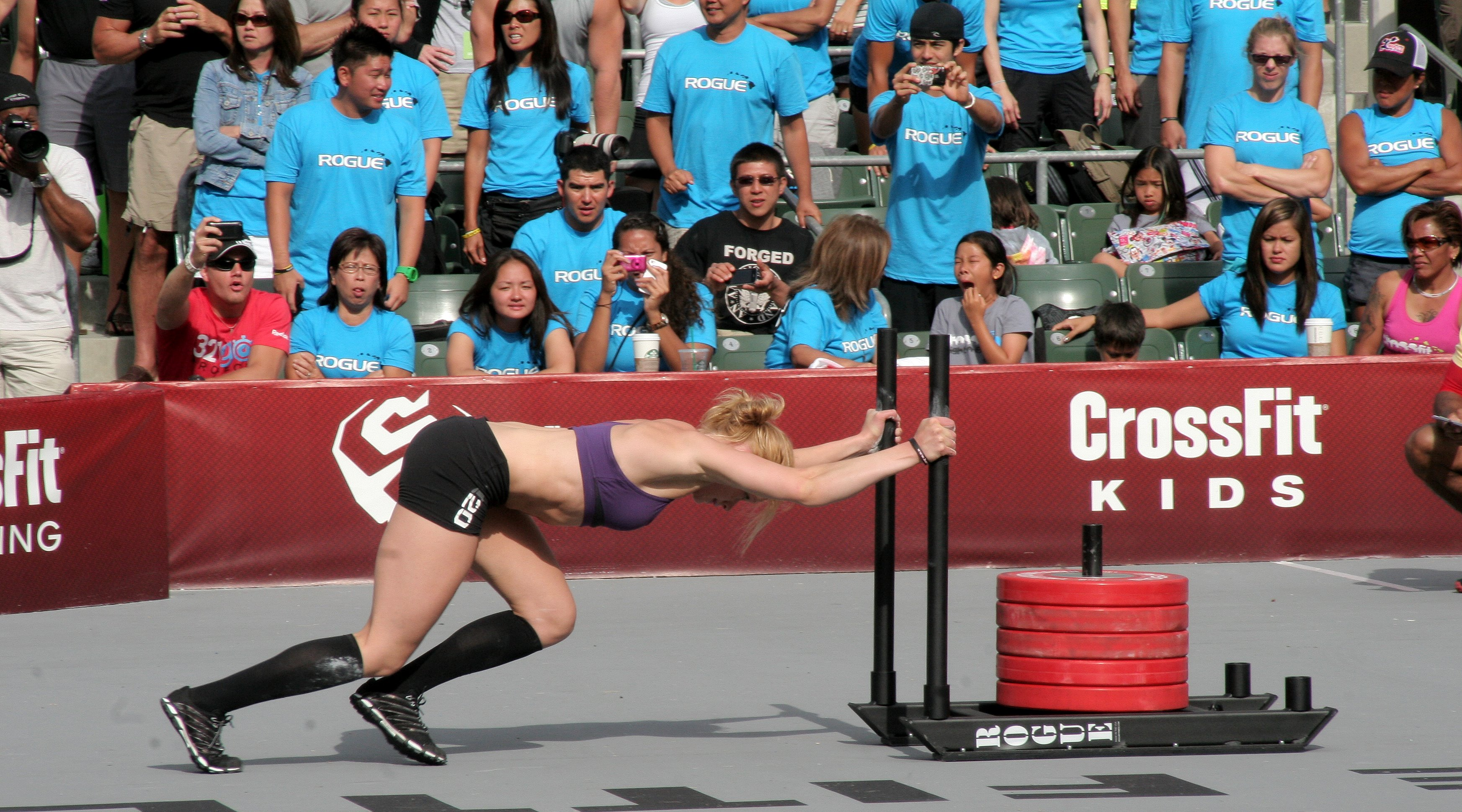
Annie Thorisdottir in the Dog Sled event that she won at the 2011 CrossFit Games

- Dog Sled – 3 rounds of and 30 Double-unders, 10 reps of Overhead squats (135 lb. for men, 95-lb. for women); then 3 rounds of 10 Handstand push-ups, 40-foot Sled push, Sled (+385 lb. for men, +275 lb. for women)
- The End 1 – In three minutes, as many reps as possible (AMRAP), 20-calorie Row, 30 Wall-ball Shots (20-lb. ball for men, 14-lb. for women), 20 Toes-to-bars, 30 Box jumps (24-inch box), 20 Sumo deadlift high pulls (108-lb. kettlebell for men, 72-lb. for women), 30 Burpees, 20 Shoulder-to-overheads (135 lb. for men, 135 lb. for women), Sled pull
- The End 2 – One minute rest after The End 1 event, then identical drills as The End 1 but AMRAP in 6 minutes.
- The End 3 – Two minute rest after The End 2 event, then identical drills as before, but this time the one who finishes the eight drills first wins.

== Team events ==
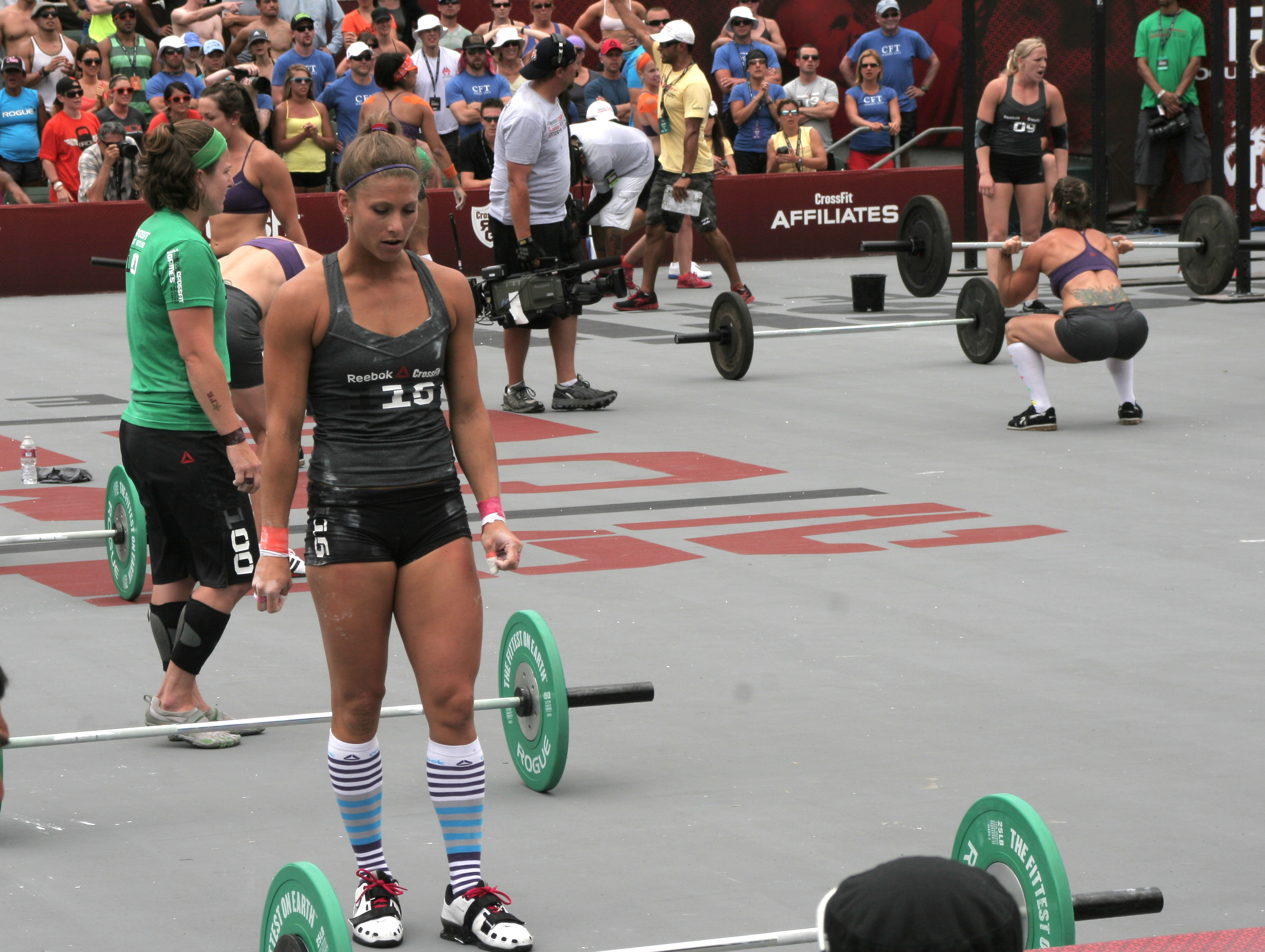
Team finals at the 2011 CrossFit Games. Team CrossFit New England in dark gray and black

Every team had six members. Scoring in the team events was the same as for the individuals, but the Friday and Saturday team events were considered qualifiers for the final event on Sunday. Only 6 teams may qualify for the final event, where scores were reset. The team that won this event were declared the champions. CrossFit New England won the competition, winning $30,000 in prize money.

- Event 1: Sandbag Move – Move 15 sandbags (1,700 pounds in total) across field for 200 yards over 2 obstacles (logs and a wall), then move sandbags back to the starting point over obstacles.
- Event 2: Rope climb – In two minutes, as many 15' Rope climbs as possible.
- Event 3: Clean – Followed event 2 immediately with no rest period. Team members establish a 1 rep max Clean individually, the sum of individuals' max loads was the team score.
- Event 4: Triplet Sprint – 40 muscle ups, 100 deadlifts (245 lb. for men/165 lb. for women), 100 GHD sit-ups, Sprint relay complex (each team member runs 50 yards, then 100 yards, 150 yards, 100 yards)
- Event 5: Killer Kage – 4 team members (2 men and 2 women) perform the series of workouts, but can one can perform at a time, and can only move to the next until the previous member had finished. All must finish before the second series can start. First series: 20 Shoulder to overhead (135 lb. for men/95 lb. for women), 20 Box jump (24" for men/20" for women), 50 foot Kage (monkey bars) traverse, 50 Double-unders, Bike 500 meters. Second series: Bike 500 meters, 50 Double-unders, 50 foot Kage traverse, 20 Box jump (24" for men /20" for women), 20 Shoulder to overhead (135 lb. for men/95lb. for women)
- Event 6: Girls – Team members competed in a relay (first three by female members of team, last three by males)
  - "Elizabeth" – 21-15-9 reps of Clean 95 pounds and Ring dips
  - "Fran" – 21-15-9 reps of 65 pound Thruster and Pull-ups
  - "Isabel" – 30 reps of Snatch 95 pounds
  - "Grace" – 30 reps of 135 pound Clean and Jerk
  - "Diane" – 21-15-9 reps of 225 lb. Deadlift and Handstand push-ups
  - "Karen" – 150 Wallball shots, 20 pound ball

== Podium finishers ==
=== Individuals and teams ===
Place	Men	Women	Team
1st	Rich Froning	Annie Thorisdottir	CrossFit New England
2nd	Josh Bridges	Kristan Clever	CrossFit Fort Vancouver
3rd	Ben Smith	Rebecca Voigt	Rocklin CrossFit

=== Masters men ===
Place	45-49	50-54	55-59	60+
1st	Scott DeTore	Gord MacKinnon	Steve Anderson	Greg Walker
2nd	Gene LaMonica	Larry Silber	Scott Olson	Christopher Kulp
3rd	Ron Ortiz	Mark Rosen	Brett Wilson	Mark Laakso

=== Masters women ===
Place	45-49	50-54	55-59	60+
1st	Susan Habbe	Mary Beth Litsheim	Shelley Noyce	Betsy Finley
2nd	Laurie Meschishnick	Heidi Fish	Darlene Price	Dee Jones
3rd	Kelly Guillory	Gabriele Schlicht	Charm Mathis	Meryl Joseph
