= 2009 CrossFit Games =

Athletic competition

- Venue: CrossFit Ranch
- Location: Aromas, California
- Dates: July 10-12, 2009

Champions
- Men: Mikko Salo
- Women: Tanya Wagner
- Team: Northwest CrossFit

The 2009 CrossFit Games were the third annual CrossFit Games held on July 10–12, 2009 at a ranch in Aromas, California. The men's competition, with a field of 74 competitors, was won by Mikko Salo. The women's, with a field of 72, was won by Tanya Wagner. The team competition by Northwest CrossFit.

Qualification events called the Regionals were introduced this year to cope with the increasing number of athletes who wanted to participate in the Games. 150 athletes qualified for the individual events, while nearly 100 teams participated in the Affiliate Cup which required no qualification. The Affiliate Cup became an official team competition this year with its own separate team-based events.

Cuts in the number of athletes in the Games were introduced this year to reduce the field during the course of the competition. Each winner of the individual competitions received a prize of $5,000. Steroid testing at the Games was introduced for the first time this year. Spectators at the Games had grown to an expected 2,500.

== Qualification ==
Due to the increasing number of competitors, qualification events were initiated this year for individual athletes: 17 Regionals were held worldwide so competitors can qualify for the Games. This year there was also a "last chance online qualifier" – athletes who missed the Regionals can submit their videoed workouts via email. Among those who qualified this way was this year's podium finisher, Tommy Hackenbruck. Special invites were also given to the top 5 men and women from the 2008 Games and the champions of the 2007 Games. No qualification was required for the team events.

== Individual Competition ==
The first five events took place Saturday, July 10, 2009, followed by the last three events on Sunday. For the first time, the number of athletes was cut during the Games. There were 74 men and 72 women at the start of the competition, and they were reduced progressively – the bottom 10 men and 10 women were cut after the Deadlift event and after the Row/Hammer Stake event, and only 16 men and 16 women were left after the fifth event Couplet to compete in the last three events on Sunday. This year the scoring system was changed to points awarded exactly the same as the placing, i.e. one point for first, two for second, etc. The competitor with the lowest total would be the winner.

=== Event 1: Run ===
Each competitor completed a 7 kilometer hill run.

During the run, the previous year's champion Jason Khalipa blacked out, collapsing a few times, but recovered enough to complete the race third from last. Chris Spealler won the men's event, and Sarah Dunsmore won the women's.

=== Event 2: Deadlift ===
A deadlift ladder – In 30-second intervals each competitor completes one deadlift in increasing 10 pound increments until they are unable to complete the lift or finish the ladder. The men started at 315 pounds and went up to 505 pounds while the women started at 185 pound and went up to 375 pounds.

Despite collapsing in the first event, Khalipa managed to win the Deadlift event.

=== Event 3: Sandbag Hill Sprint ===
A 170-meter hill sprint while carrying 35-pound sandbags, two bags for men and one for women.

=== Event 4: Row / Hammer Stake ===
Each competitor completed a 500-meter row on a Concept-2 rowing machine, hammered a stake into the ground (4-foot for men and 3-foot for women), and then finished with another 500-meter row.

=== Event 5: Couplet ===
This event consisted of three rounds of 30 wallballs and 30 squat snatches.

=== Event 6: Snatch ===
Maximum weight for one repetition of a barbell snatch

=== Event 7: Triplet ===
Each competitor had to complete as many rounds as possible in 8 minutes with each round consisting of 4 handstand push-ups, 8 kettlebell swings, and 12 GHD sit-ups.

=== Event 8: Chipper ===
The competitors progressed through this event by completing the required number of repetitions of each movement before moving to the next movement. The event consisted of 15 cleans, 30 toes-to-bar, 30 box jumps, 15 muscle-ups, 30 dumbbell push press, 30 double-unders, 15 thrusters, 30 pull-ups, 30 burpees, and 300-foot walking lunges with a barbell plate held overhead.

== Affiliate Cup ==
For the third annual CrossFit Games, the Affiliate Cup was awarded using a separate team based competition instead of awarding it to an affiliate with the top individual competitors. Teams only had to register in order to compete without the need to qualify prior to the games, and 96 teams competed. Team workouts consisted of two men and two women and the teams were allowed two substitute competitors on their roster. Scoring is the same as for the individual events, i.e. lowest points total wins the Games. The first three events took place on Friday, July 10, 2009, and the final event was on Sunday, July 12, 2009.

=== Stadium Workout ===
The first movement was 30 wallballs completed relay style by all four competitors. Then each competitor had to simultaneously complete a 300 meter row on a Concept-2 rowing machine, 30 twenty-four inch box jumps, 30 kettlebell swings, and 30 dumbbell push press or push jerks with one competitor at each station at a time. Once each competitor had finished all movements the team moved on to the deadlift station where they each had to complete 30 deadlifts in a relay style.

=== Hill Workout ===
An approximately 2500 meter hill run. Each competitor completes a 500 meter leg of the run followed by a final 500 meters run by the entire team.

=== North Pad Workout ===
Maximum weight 3-repetition overhead squat plus maximum repetitions of pull-ups combined over three attempts.

=== The Final ===
A combined chipper style workout consisting of 75 squat cleans, 150 toes-to-bar, 150 box jumps, 75 thrusters, 35 muscle-ups, 150 burpees, 150 double-unders, and 300-foot walking lunges with a 35lb. plate overhead.

== Podium finishers ==
Place	Men	Women	Team
1st	Mikko Salo	Tanya Wagner	Northwest CrossFit
2nd	Tommy Hackenbruck	Charity Vale	CrossFit Central
3rd	Moe Kelsey	Cary Kepler	CrossFit NorCal
