= 2012 CrossFit Games =

Athletic competition

- Venue: Home Depot Center; Camp Pendleton
- Location: Carson, California
- Dates: July 11–15, 2012

Champions
- Men: Rich Froning Jr.
- Women: Annie Thorisdottir
- Team: Hacks Pack UTE

The 2012 CrossFit Games were the sixth edition of the CrossFit Games, held on July 11–15, 2012, at the Home Depot Center in Carson, California, with some events taking place at Camp Pendleton. The men's competition was won by Rich Froning Jr., the women's by Annie Thorisdottir, and the Affiliate Cup by Hacks Pack UTE. Both Froning and Thorisdottir were repeat champions from the previous year.

The number of participants increased to 69,000 for this year's Open. In this season, the special invites to previous champions were removed and they all had to qualify through the Regionals. At the Games, 15 events took place over four days, the most yet for a Games.

== Qualification ==
=== Open ===
in this season, 69,000 athletes registered to compete in the Open. The Open took place over five weeks (reduced from six in 2011) from February 22 to March 25, 2012, during which a workout was release every week for the athletes to perform, and athletes can then submit their results for each of the 5 workouts before the deadline every week. Cash prizes were offered to participants selected for the Spirit of the Open award, as well as individual winners in the Open from this year onward. Rich Froning and Kristan Clever were the respective Open male and female individual winners.

=== Regionals ===
From the Open, 60 men, 60 women and 30 teams of each region with the best results proceeded to compete in 17 Regionals that took place from April 27 to May 27. Previous champions also had to compete in the Regionals, but extra qualification places were provided for regions where the champions competed. Athletes competed in 6 events in the Regionals – after five events, the field was cut to 18 in each Regional. Both the Open and Regionals again used a point system different from the one used in the Games: points were awarded according to the position (1 point for first place, etc.), those with the lowest total points would qualify for the next stage. 91 athletes, 46 men and 45 women, went on to compete in the Games.

== Individuals ==
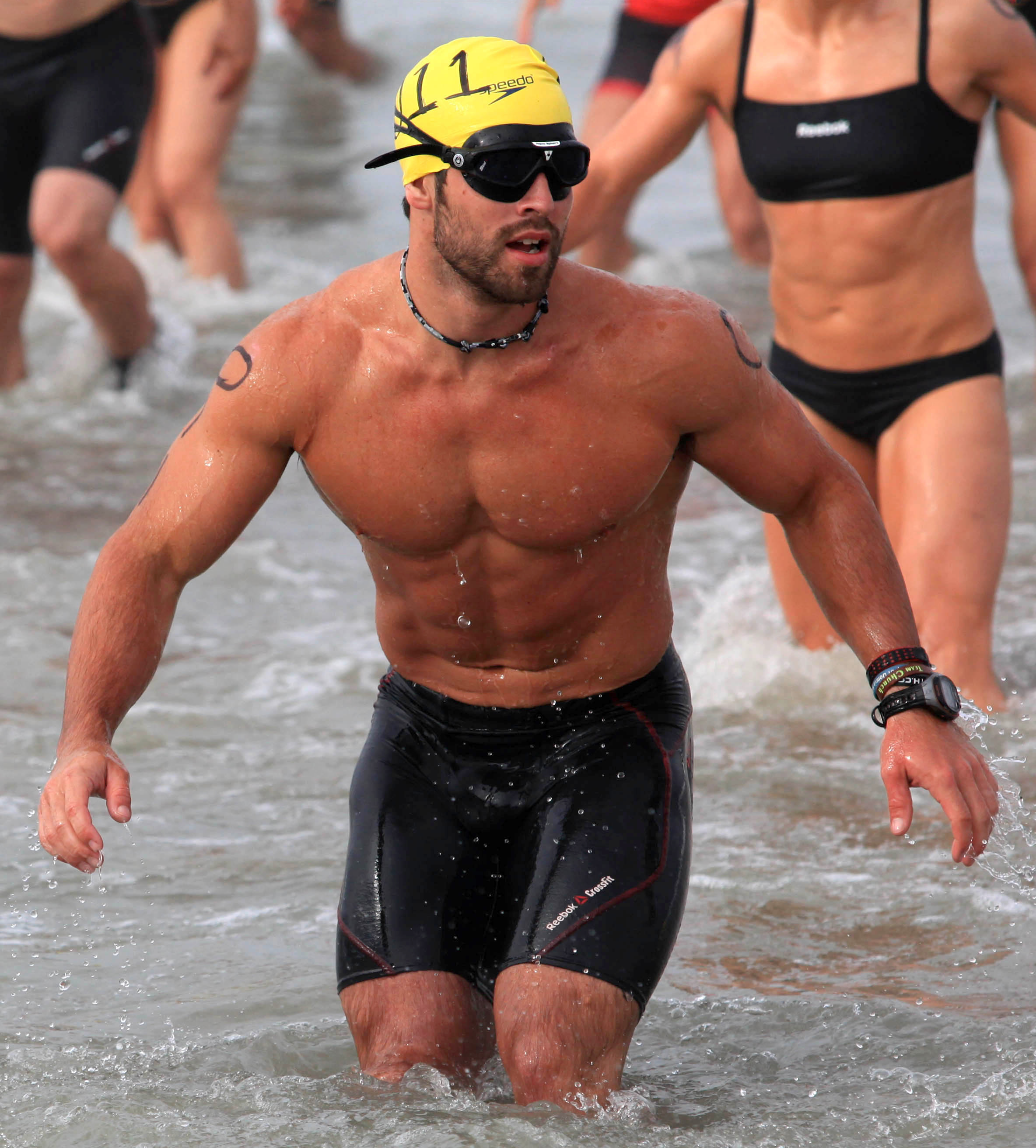
Rich Froning walking backward into the ocean as he was wearing swimming fins in event 1.

The first three event were held at Marine Corps Base Camp Pendleton, which were unexpected additions, taking place as they did two days before athletes had expected the Games to start. A rest day was introduced after the events at Camp Pendleton before competition resumed at the Home Depot Center in Carson.

The scoring system was the same as for 2011, with all events scoring 100 points for the winner apart a few events: the Broad Jump, Ball Toss, and Sprint events were scored 50 points. The number of athletes was cut to 36 after the Clean Ladder event, 24 after the Chipper, 18 after the Double-banger, 15 after Elizabeth, 12 after Isabel.

=== July 11, 2012 ===
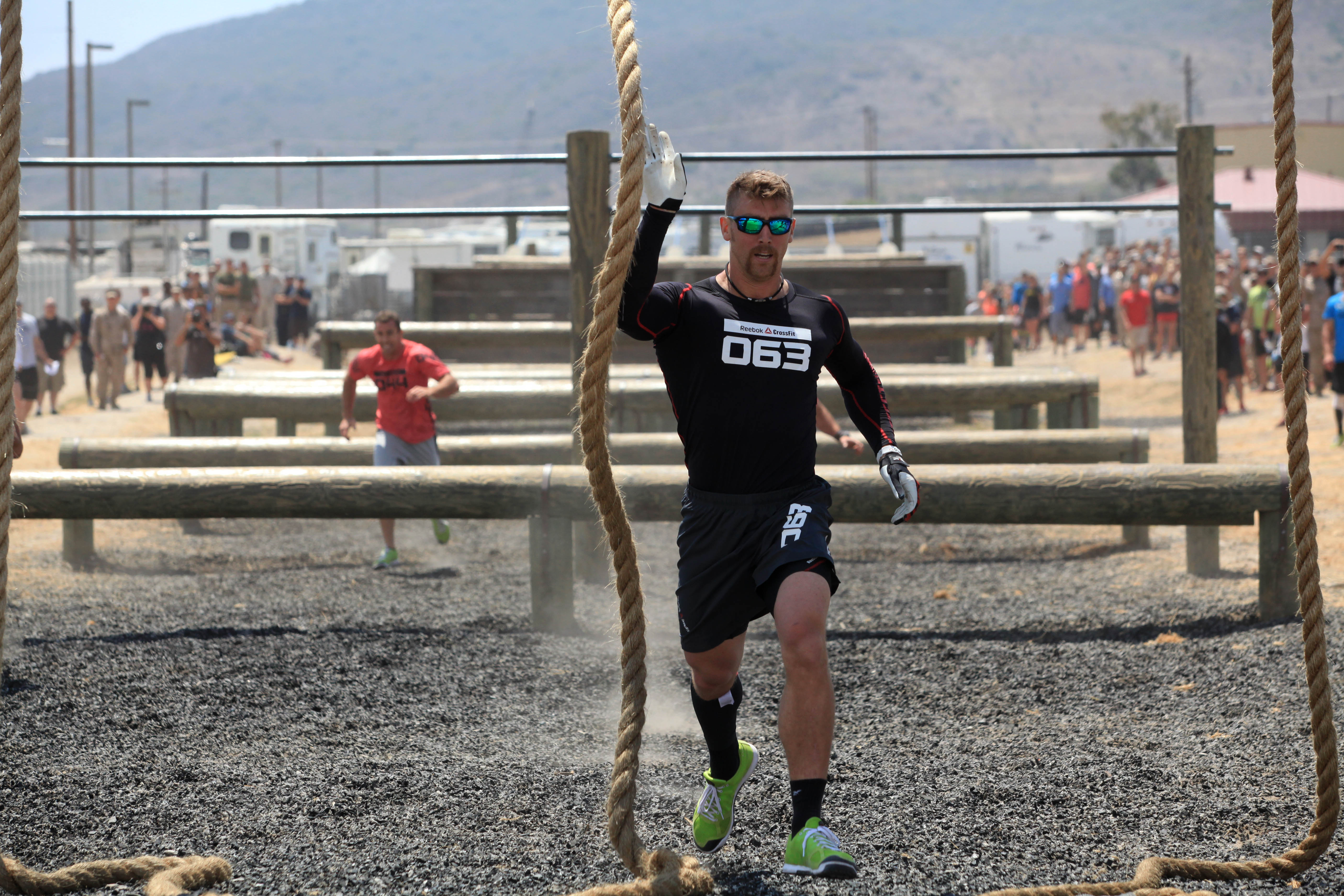
Spencer Hendel winning the men's obstacle course elimination event

- Pendleton 1 – 700 m ocean swim, 8 km cycling, checkpoint at 150 m after starting 11.3 km run for Pendleton 2.
- Pendleton 2 – 11 km mountain run
- Obstacle Course – three rounds of head-to-head obstacle course race.

=== July 13, 2012 ===
- Broad Jump – Standing jump for distance. Originally scheduled for Pendleton, but rescheduled to Friday. Event won by Nate Schrader for the men, Fortunato for the women.
- Ball Toss – Throw medicine balls (men 4 lb./women 2 lb.) from GHD
- Track Triplet – 3 rounds of 8 split snatch (men 115 lb./women 75 lb.), 7 bar muscle-ups, 400 m run.
- Medball Handstand Push-ups – 3 rounds of 8 medicine ball cleans (men 150 lb./women 80 lb.), carry medicine ball for 100 ft., 7 parallette handstand push-ups, carry medicine ball for 100 ft.

=== July 14, 2012 ===
- Sprint – 50-yard sprint and back, 100-yard sprint and back.
- Rope-Sled – 5 rounds of 20-foot rope climb and 20-yard sled drive
- Clean ladder – 1 clean every 30 seconds with increasing weight for maximum weight, after a failed attempt, deadlift repetitions for partial pounds
- Chipper – 10 overhead squat (men 155 lb./women 105 lb.), jump over box (men 24 in./women 20 in), Fat bar thrusters (men 135 lb./women 95 lb.), power clean (men 205 lb./women 125 lb.), 10 toes-to-bar, and after 10 burpees muscle ups, repeat in reverse order.

=== July 15, 2012 ===
- Double-banger – 3 rounds of 50 Double-unders, followed by Banger (striking with a hammer to move a heavy object on a sliding track). The first round was a Low banger, the second Down banger, the last round Mid banger. Kyle Kasperbauer won the event for the men and Elisabeth Akinwale won for the women.
- Elizabeth – 21-15-9 reps of Cleans (men 135 lb./women 95 lb.) and Ring Dips
- Isabel – 30 Snatch (men 135 lb./women 95 lb.)
- Fran – 21-15-9 reps of Thrusters (men 95 lb. /women 65 lb.) and pull-ups

== Team events ==
The scoring system for the team events was the same as for 2011, where the Friday and Saturday events were regarded as qualifiers, and the scores were wiped clean for the final events on Sunday. Six teams competed in the same final events ("The Girls") as 2011, with the winners crowned the team champions. Unlike previous Games, all six members are required to compete in every events.

- Sprint Relay – 6× 415m sprints
- Big Bob – Push Big Bob 100 yard down the field, then pull it up back.
- Front Squat – 2 rep Front squat for max load (heaviest weights for men and women are added separately, 50 points each)
- Team Triplet – For mix-gender pair: 750m row with front rack held (men 215 lb./women 145 lb.)
- Yoke – Yoke carry (men 370 lb./230 lb.)
- Rope-Clean – Women first, then men: 30 reps of Clean and jerk (women 135 lb./men 185 lb.), 100-yard run, 20 rope climbs, then each member complete 1 rope climb and 1 rep of clean and jerk (women 135 lb./men 185 lb.)
- Bar Muscle-up – Max rep for men and women (totaled separately, 50 points each)
- Team Chipper – 30 reps each of GHD sit-ups, deadlifts (men 225 lb./155 lb.), double-unders, overhead squat (men 95 lb./women 65 lb.), and pull-ups
- The Girls – Team members competed in a relay (first three by female members of team, last three by males)
  - "Elizabeth" – 21-15-9 reps of Clean 95 pounds and Ring dips
  - "Fran" – 21-15-9 reps of 65 pound Thruster and Pull-ups
  - "Isabel" – 30 reps of Snatch 95 pounds
  - "Grace" – 30 reps of 135 pound Clean and Jerk
  - "Diane" – 21-15-9 reps of 225 lb. Deadlift and Handstand push-ups
  - "Karen" – 150 Wallball shots, 20 pound ball

== Podium finishers ==
=== Individuals and teams ===
Place	Men	Women	Team
1st	Rich Froning	Annie Thorisdottir	Hacks Pack UTE
2nd	Matt Chan	Julie Foucher	SPC CrossFit
3rd	Kyle Kasperbauer	Talayna Fortunato	Diablo CrossFit Anejo

=== Masters men ===
Place	45-49	50-54	55-59	60+
1st	Gene LaMonica	Gord MacKinnon	Tim Anderson	Scott Olson
2nd	Scott DeTore	Brig Edwards	Rick Rodriguez	Derrick Hill
3rd	Eric Bartlett	Peter Ryder	Garry Jones	Christopher Kulp

=== Masters women ===
Place	45-49	50-54	55-59	60+
1st	Lisa Mikkelsen	Susan Habbe	Marnel King	Mary Schwing
2nd	Tracy Maceachern	Mary Beth Litsheim	Annie Michel	Betsy Finley
3rd	Cindy Briggs	Elaine Polito	Charm Mathis	Lois Charlton

== Day 1 pictures ==
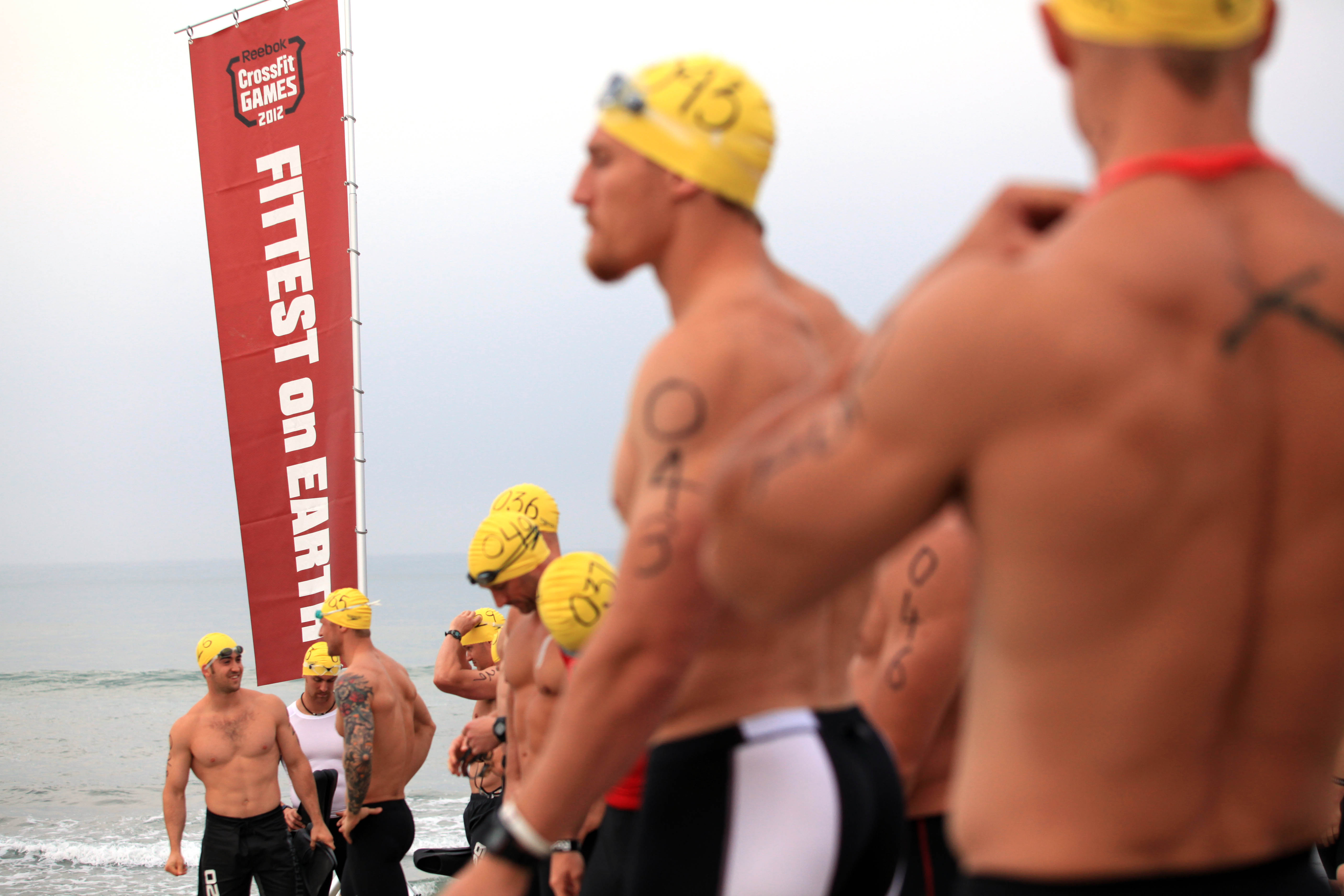
Athletes including Ben Smith waiting to start the ocean swim

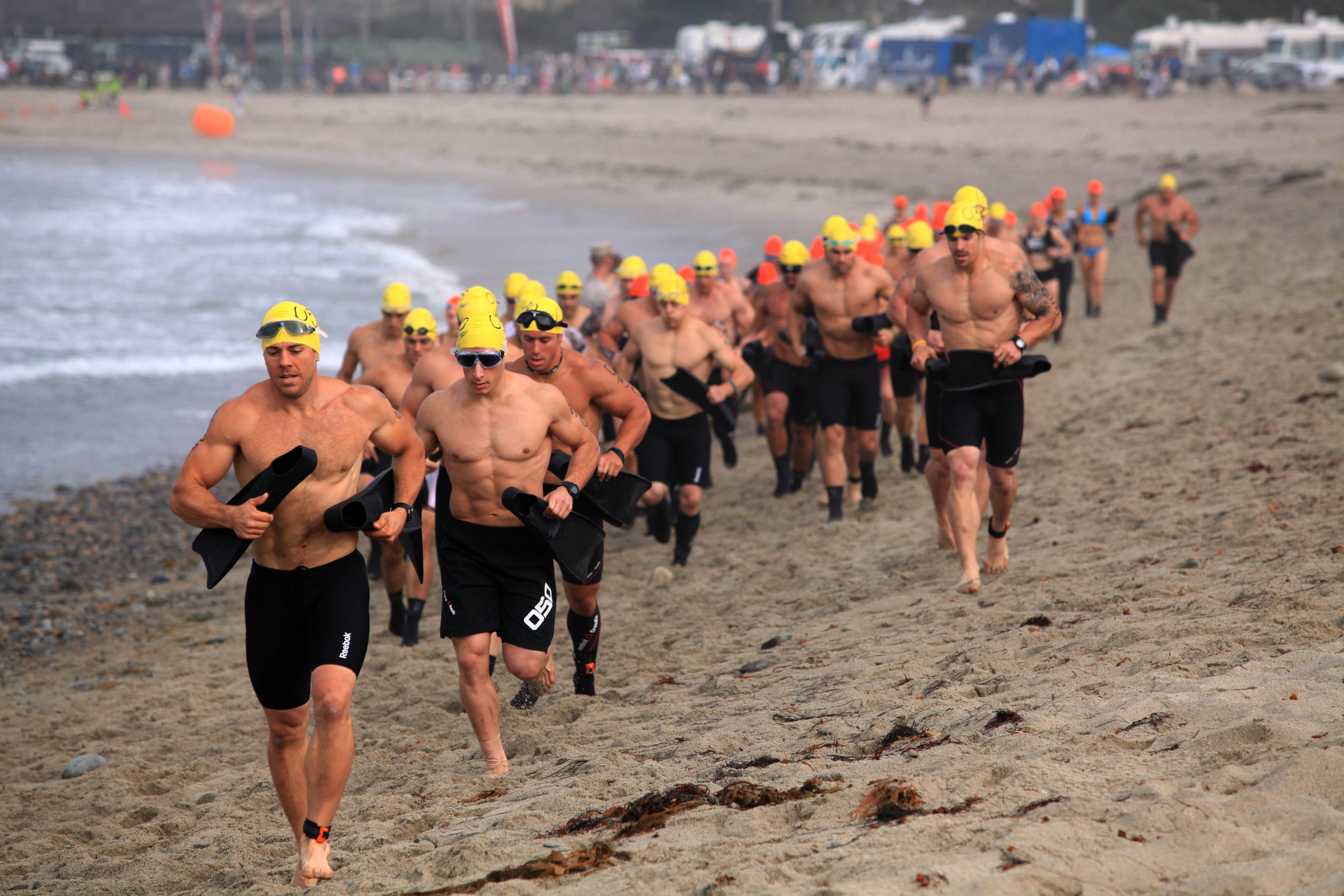
Athletes running at the start of event 1

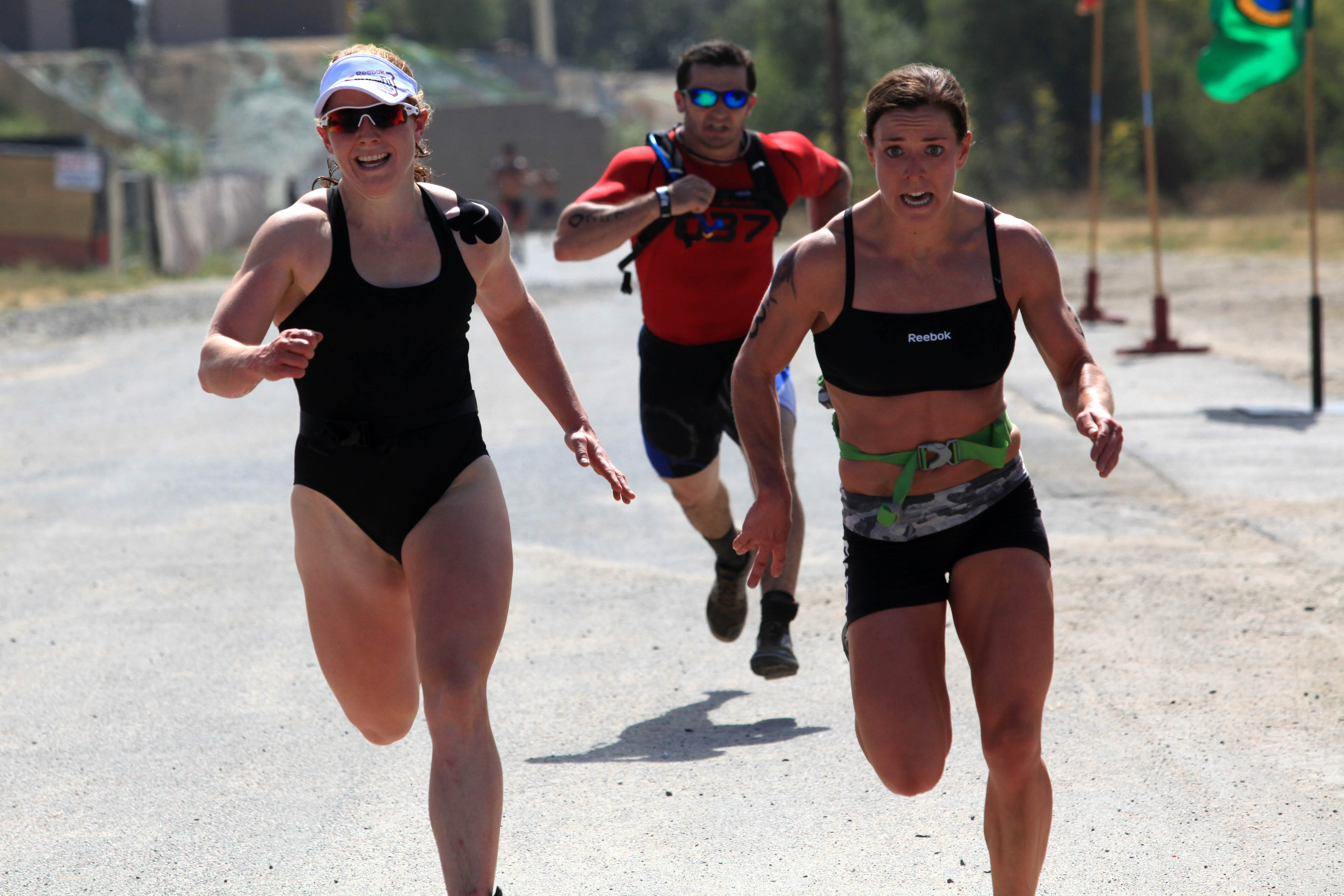
Ruth Anderson-Horrell (l) and Christy Phillips Adkins (r) sprint to the finish line of the 2012 Reebok CrossFit Games event 2.

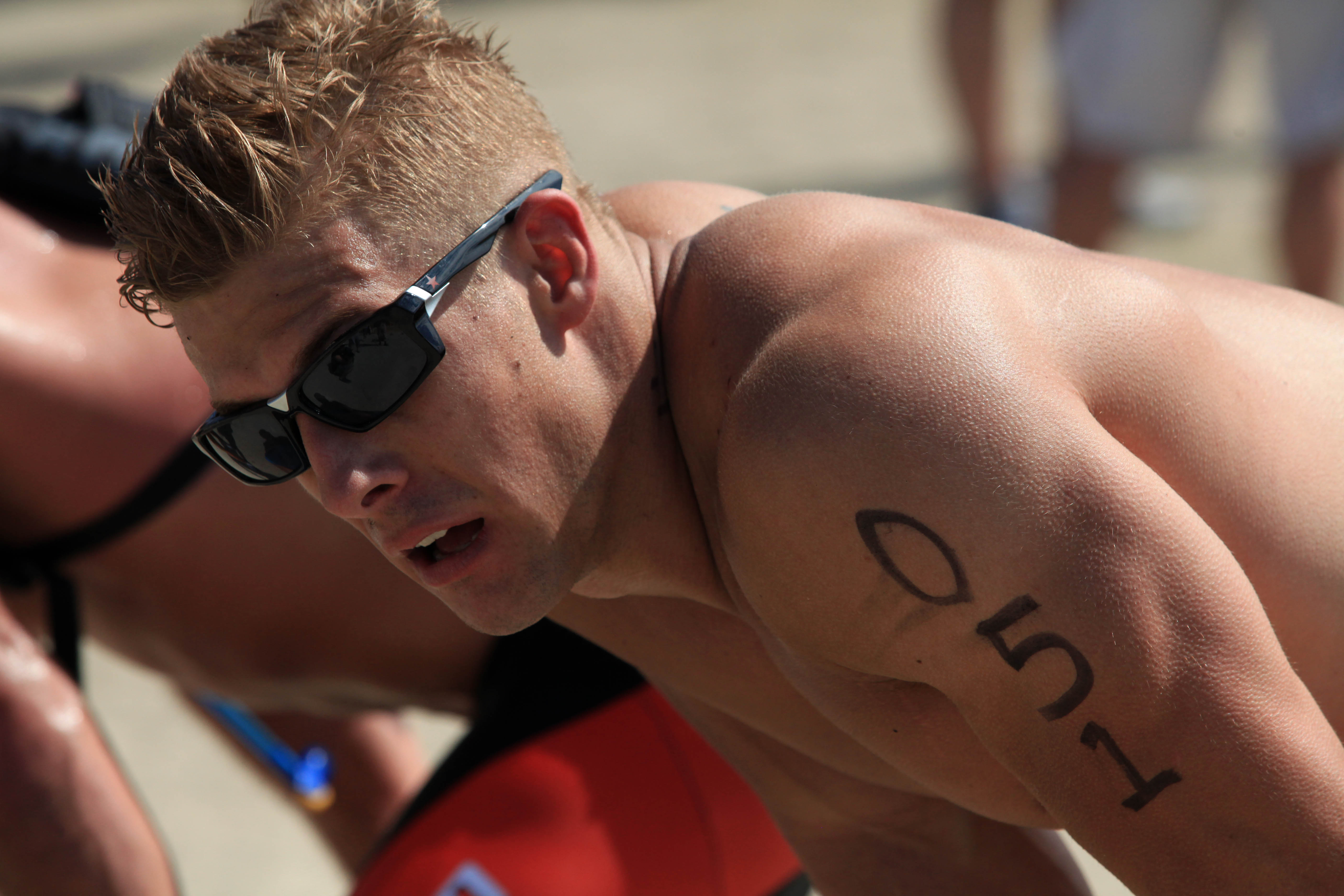
Daniel Tyminski stops to catch his breath after crossing the finish line of event 2.

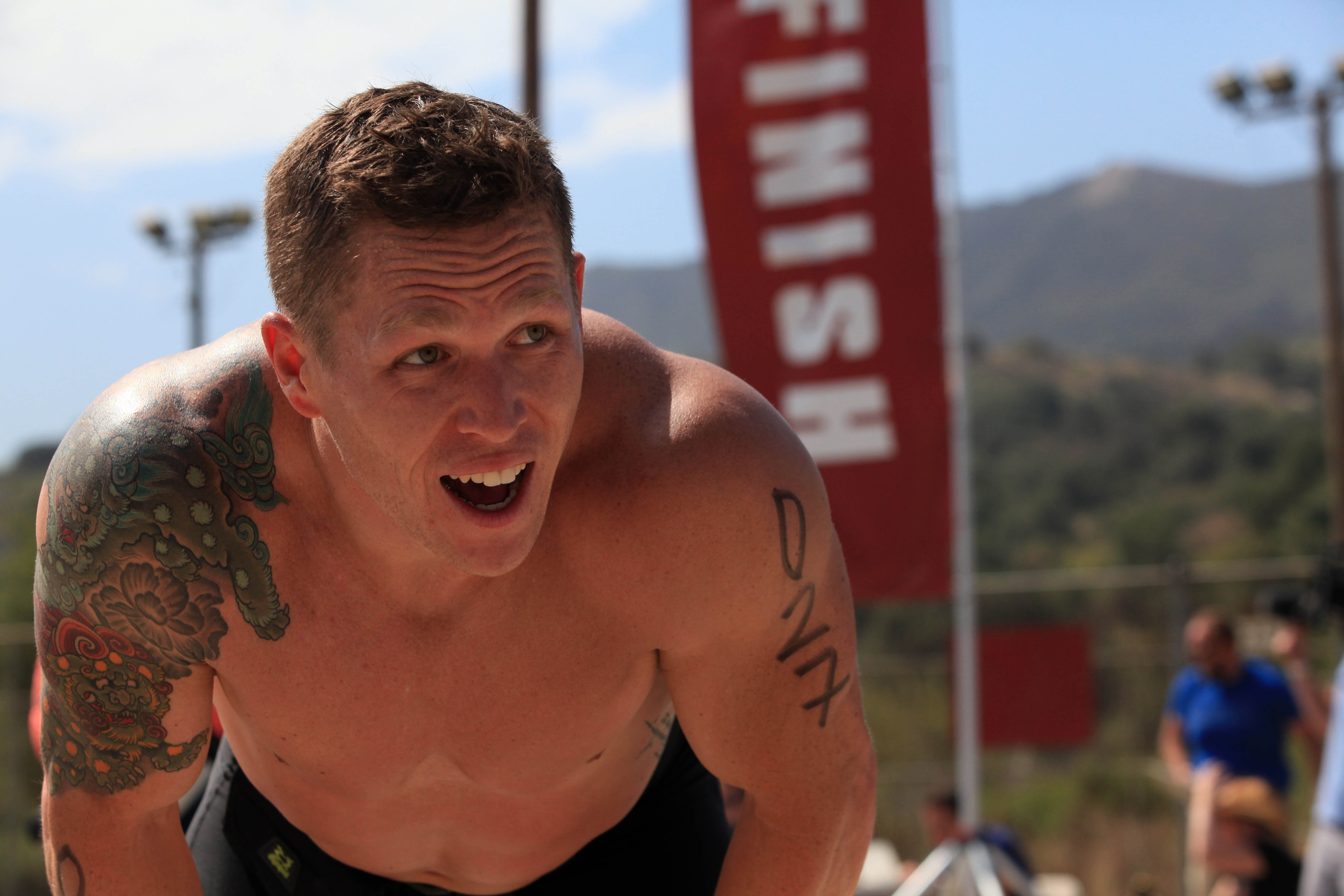
Matt Chan stops to catch his breath after crossing the finish line of event 2.

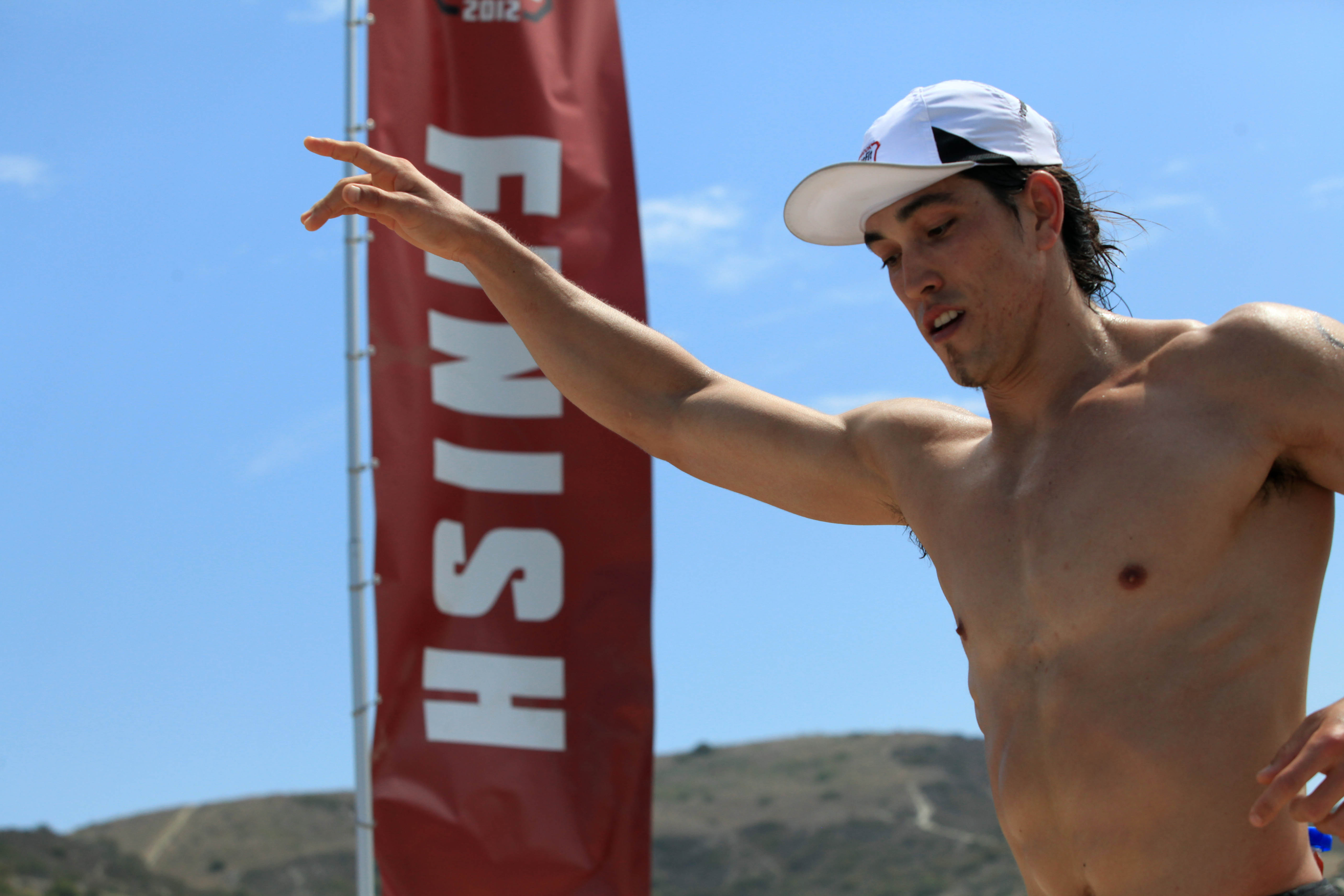
Aja Barto celebrates as he crosses the finish line event 2.

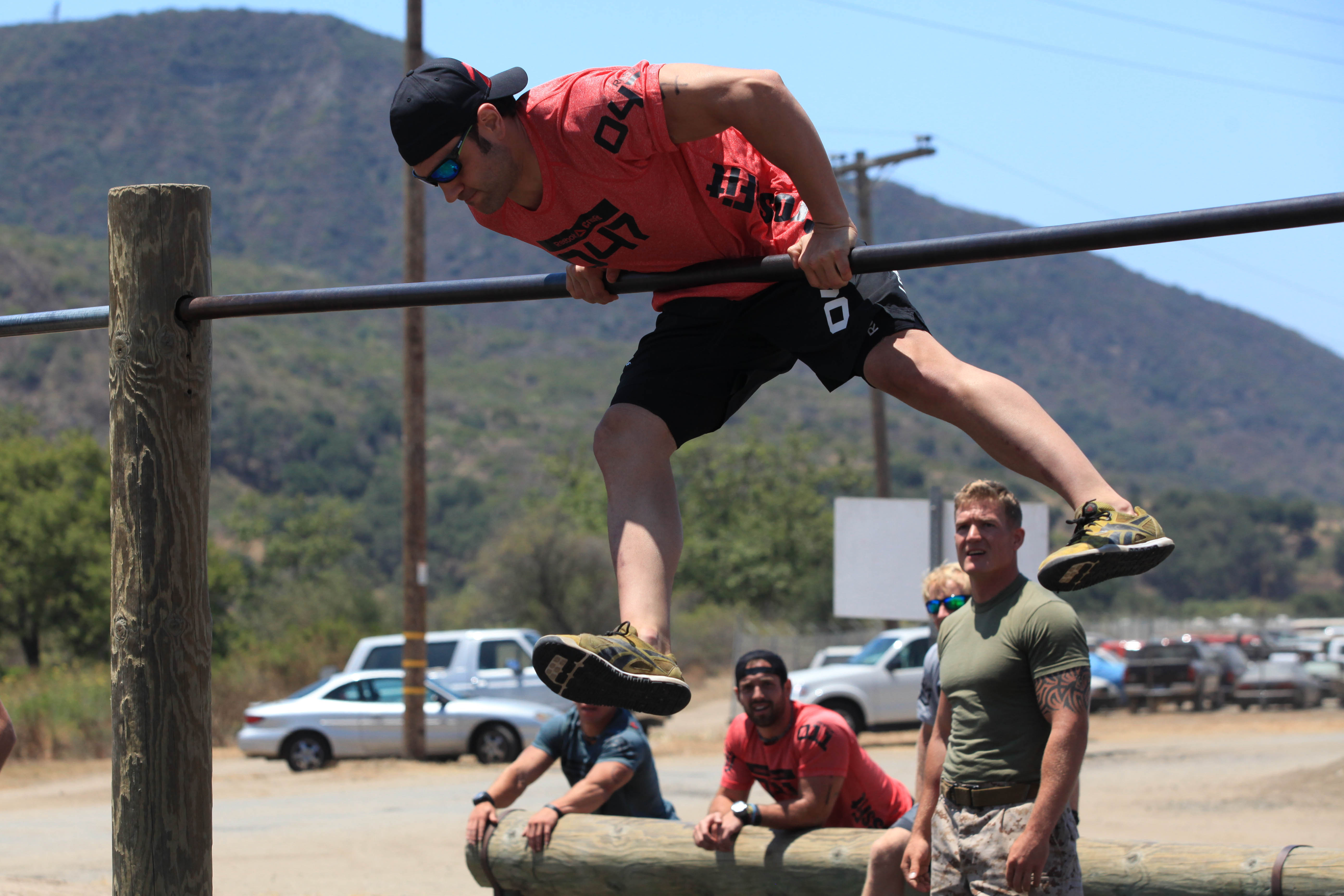
Matthew Lefave flips over an obstacle course bar during event 3.

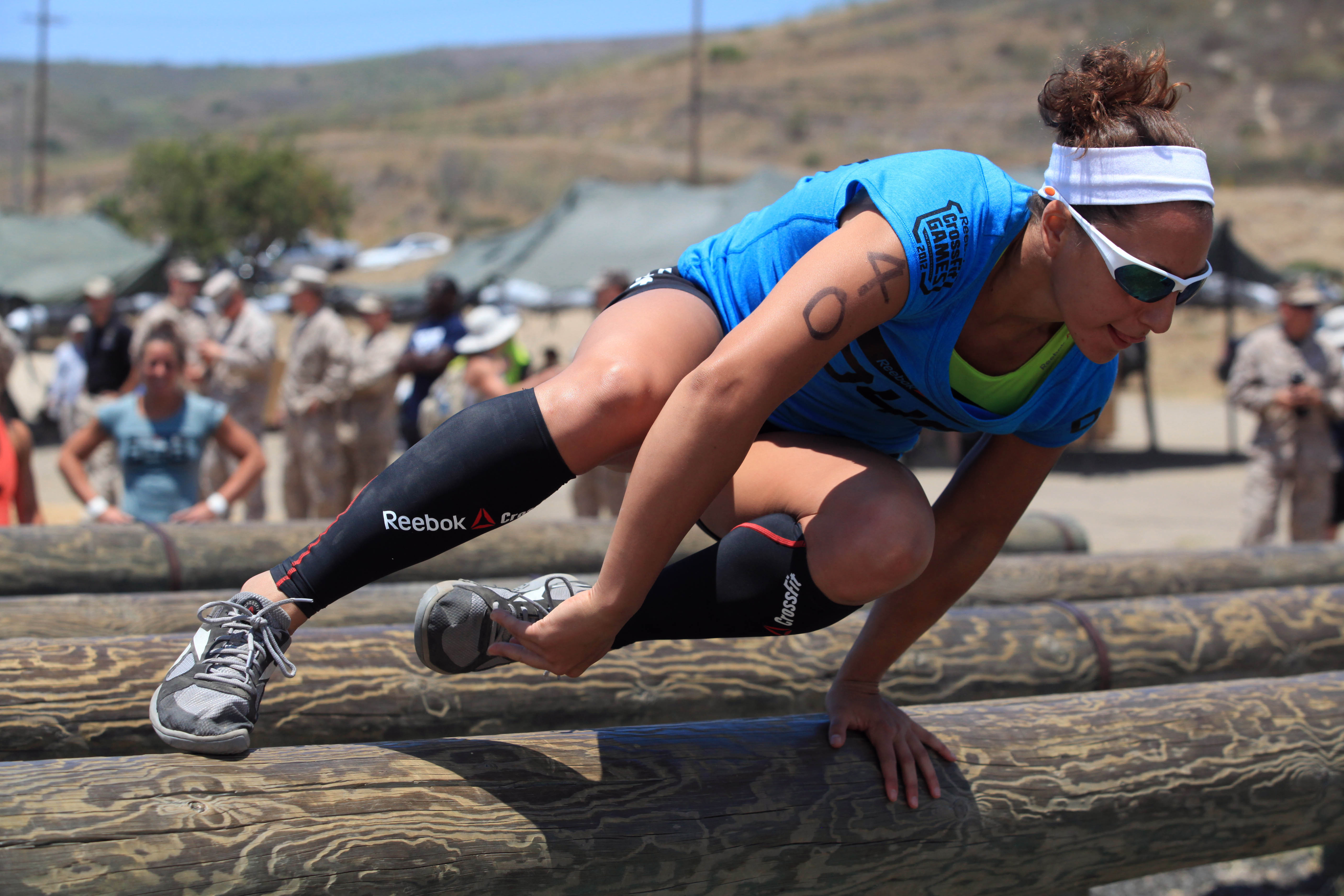
Jasmine Dever hurdles over a set of wooden logs during event 3.

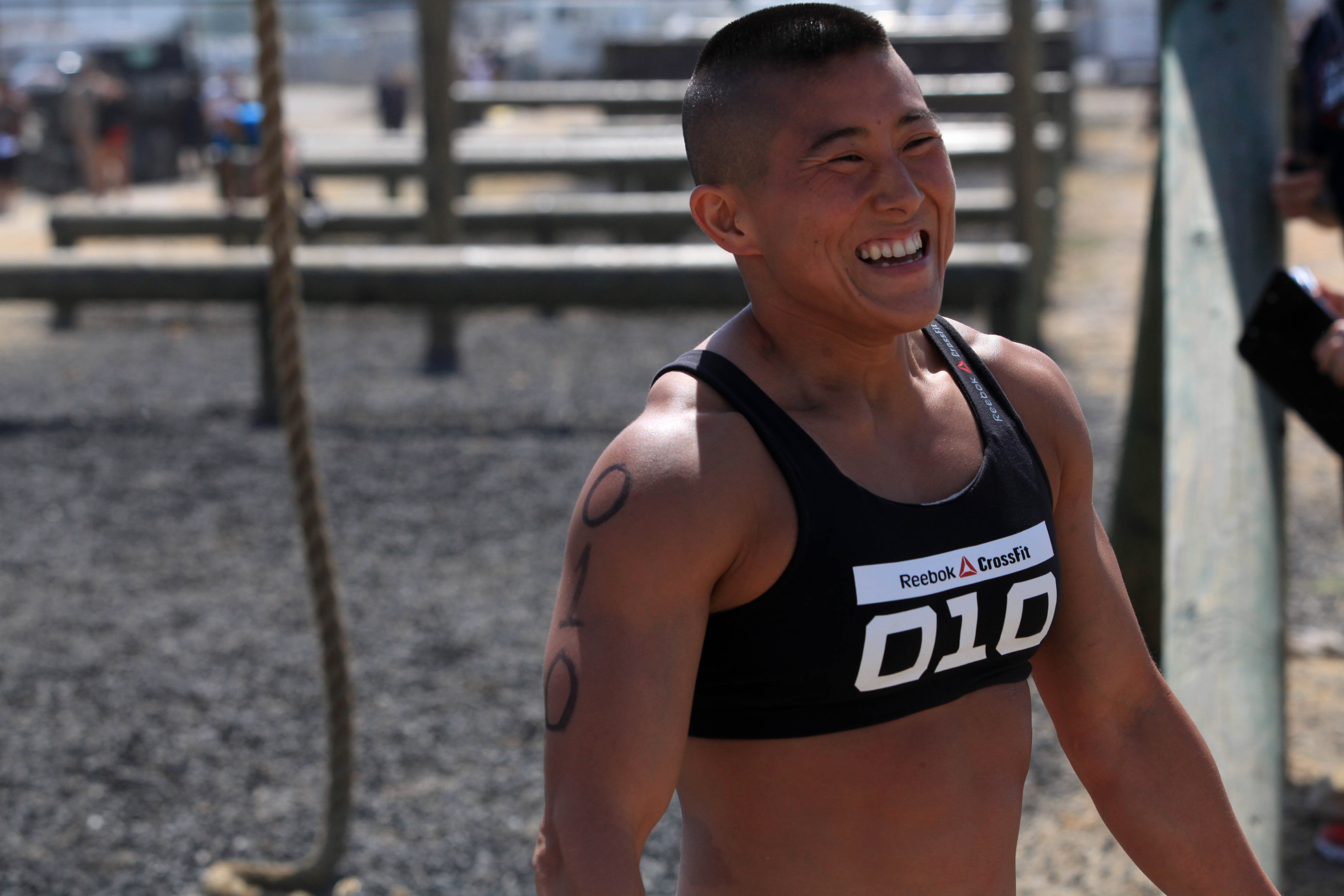
Kristan Clever smiles after a 2nd-place finish of the women's obstacle course final elimination heat.
