= 2010 CrossFit Games =

Athletic competition

- Venue: Home Depot Center
- Location: Carson, California
- Dates: July 16–18, 2010

Champions
- Men: Graham Holmberg
- Women: Kristan Clever
- Team: CrossFit Fort Vancouver

The 2010 CrossFit Games were the fourth CrossFit Games, held on July 16–18, 2010. This year's Games were the first to be staged at the Home Depot Center in Carson, California after three years at the ranch in Aromas. The men's competition was won by Graham Holmberg, the women's by Kristan Clever, and the Team by CrossFit Fort Vancouver.

This year the qualification was expanded to a two-stage process with the introduction of Sectionals, a precursor to the online CrossFit Open introduced the following year. Individual athletes had to compete in local Sectionals to qualify for the Regionals. This was also the first time that regional qualifiers were required for all games participants including individuals, affiliate teams, and masters. The masters competition was introduced this year for male and female participants over the age of 50. The number of individual athletes are narrowed down to 50 men and 50 women for the finals at the Games. The number of scored events in the Games was increased to nine spread over three days of competition. With sponsorship from Progenex, each individual winner was awarded $25,000.

The 2010 Games featured the debut of Rich Froning Jr., who would go on to win the Games the following four years. He had a lead going into the final event of the 2010 Games, but climbed the rope legless when he could use his legs to help with the climb, and ended up 12th in the event, allowing Holmberg to emerge the winner of the Games. This year, the Games were streamed live for the first time online.

== Qualification ==
The qualification process was expanded this season to two stages with the introduction of Sectionals, which were subdivisions of most of the Regional competitions. There were 34 Sectionals, and the events were not standardized across these Sanctionals. The top men and women from the Sectionals were funnelled into the Regionals where they can qualify for the Games. An online qualifier was arranged for military personnel who cannot attend the Sectionals.

The number of Regionals was reduced to 13 this year by amalgamating some regions. The workouts for the Regionals were also not standardized, and each region had their own workouts. 50 men and 50 women can qualify for the finals, and these include the top 5 men and women from the 2009 Games and previous champions, but only 45 men and 41 women went on to compete in the individual competitions in this Games.

== Individual events ==
There were 9 scored events held over 3 days at the Games this year. The scoring was the same as the 2009 CrossFit Games, with the score identical to the placing (i.e. one point for first, two for second, etc.), and the athlete with the lowest total score would win the competition. The field was reduced to 24 athletes after event 3 on Saturday, then to 16 after event 5 on Sunday.

=== July 16, 2010 ===
- Event 1: Amanda – 9, 7 and 5 reps of Ring Muscle-ups and Squat Snatches (men: 135 lb./ women 95 lb.) Dave Castro named this workout in memory of 2009 CrossFit Games finalist Amanda Miller, whose multiple myeloma reoccurred one month after the Games and died in April.

=== July 17, 2010 ===
- Event 2a: Pyramid Double "Helen" – 1,200m run, 63 kettlebell swings, 36 pull-ups, followed by 800m run, 42 kettlebell swings, 24 pull-ups, and 400m run, 21 kettlebell swings, and 12 pull-ups. 1.5 pood for men's kettlebells and 1 pood for women's (1 pood = 35 lb.).
- Event 2b: Shoulder-to-overhead – Within 90 seconds after completing Pyramid Double "Helen", 1 rep max of shoulder-to-overhead for the heaviest lift.
- Event 3: Deadlift–Pistol–Double-under – As many rounds as possible (AMRAP) within 7 minutes of 7 deadlifts (men 315 lb. /women 205 lb.), sprint across court, 14 alternating pistol squats, 21 double-unders before sprinting back across court.
- Event 4: Sandbag Move – Athletes climb up the wall and stairs of the stadium to move sandbags (600 lb. in total for men and 370 lb. for women) on the stairs at one end of the stadium to the top of the stairs at the other.

=== July 18, 2010 ===
- Event 5: Cleans–Handstand Pushups – Seven rounds of 3 cleans (205 lb. for men, 135 lb. for women) and 4 handstand push-ups (handstand push-ups on ring for men, handstand push-ups on floor for women). Graham Holmberg and Kristan Clever, both eventual champions, won the event.
- Event 6a: The Final 1 – Three rounds for time of 30 push-ups with hand release, climb over wall, and 21 overhead squats (95 lb. for men / 65 lb. for women)
- Event 6b: The Final 2 – Three rounds of 30 toes-to-bars and 21 ground-to-overheads (95 lb. for men /65 lb. for women)
- Event 6c: The Final 3 – Three rounds of 5 Burpee wall jumps and 20-foot rope climbs (3 for men, 2 for women).

== Team events ==
- Event 1: 2 rounds of 70 thrusters (155 lb. for men /105 lb. for women), 50 chest-to-bar pull-ups, and 100-meter buddy carry across field, swapped half way.
- Event 2a: 1 minute max reps deadlifts (264 lb. for men /173 lb. for women), followed by 1 minute max reps pistols after a minute rest, and 1 minute max calories row after a minute rest. Start for each athlete in the team is staggered at one minute interval.
- Event 2b: 1-rep-max shoulder-to-overhead, to be completed within 12 minutes from the start of Event 2a.
- Event 3: 2 rounds of 300 m run, 15 jumps over 24-inch box, 15 dumbbell squat cleans (45 lb. for men /25 lb. for women), 30 double-unders. 15 push-ups (athletes must lift hands to show that their bodies have touched the floor), 15 GHD sit-ups, and a 30-yard lunge.
- Event 4: 10 rope climbs, move 6 sandbags and all members over wall, move sandbags 10 yards, 30 muscle-ups, move sandbags 10 yards, 100 wall-ball shots (20 lb. for men /14 lb. for women), and team rope-climb over wall.

== Podium finishers ==
Place	Men	Women	Team
1st	Graham Holmberg	Kristan Clever	CrossFit Fort Vancouver
2nd	Rich Froning	Annie Thorisdottir	CrossFit New England
3rd	Chris Spealler	Valerie Voboril	CrossFit Omaha

=== Masters ===
Place	Masters Men	Masters Women
1st	Brian Curley	Laurie Carver
2nd	Joel Nessa	Gabriele Schlicht
3rd	Paul Flores	Heidi Fish
