= Patrick Vellner =

Canadian athlete

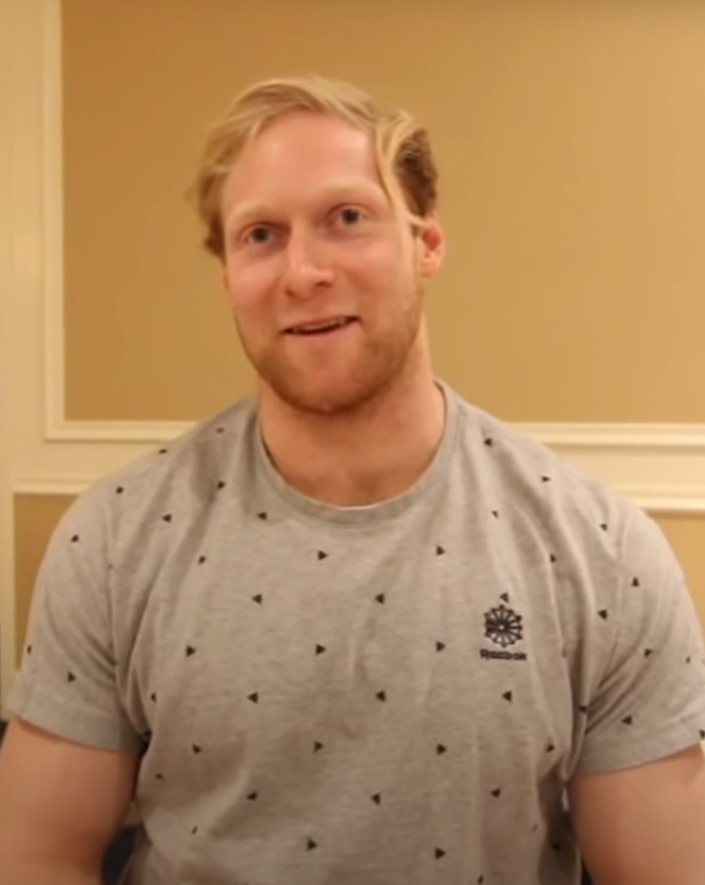

Personal information
- Nationality: Canadian
- Citizenship: Canadian
- Born: Patrick James Vellner; July 14, 1990 (age 36) Red Deer, Alberta
- Occupations: Professional CrossFit Athlete, Chiropractor
- Years active: 2015–present
- Height: 1.8 m (5 ft 11 in)
- Weight: 88.5 kg (195 lb)
- Spouse: Michelle Workun-Hill

Sport
- Sport: CrossFit
- Club: CrossFit Nanaimo
- Coached by: Michele Letendre

Achievements and titles
- Personal bests: Backsquat: 455 lb (206 kg); Clean and Jerk: 355 lb (161 kg); Snatch: 285 lb (129 kg); Deadlift: 595 lb (270 kg); Fran 2:14; Grace 1:17; Filthy 50 20:16; Helen 9:46; Fight Gone Bad 389
Medal record
Representing Canada
CrossFit Open
| Gold medal – first place | 2020 | Men |
CrossFit Games
| Silver medal – second place | 2018 | Men |
| Silver medal – second place | 2021 | Men |
| Silver medal – second place | 2023 | Men |
| Bronze medal – third place | 2016 | Men |
| Bronze medal – third place | 2017 | Men |
Rogue Invitational
| Silver medal – second place | 2019 | Men |
| Gold medal – first place | 2020 | Men |
| Silver medal – second place | 2021 | Men |
| Gold medal – first place | 2023 | Men |
Wodapalooza
| Gold medal – first place | 2019 | Men |
| Gold medal – first place | 2020 | Men |
| Gold medal – first place | 2022 | Men |
| Bronze medal – third place | 2023 | Men |
| Gold medal – first place | 2023 | Team |

Patrick Vellner is a Canadian CrossFit athlete who has eight individual appearances at the CrossFit Games, including three 2nd and two 3rd place finishes.

== Early life ==
Vellner was born in Red Deer in Alberta, Canada to Marty and Tikki Vellner. He has two brothers, Jonathan and Mitchell. Vellner competed in gymnastics and lacrosse from the age of eight, and he also played rugby. After retiring from gymnastics in 2010, he continued to play lacrosse for a team in Vermont while he was studying in Montreal. He studied kinesiology at McGill University in Montreal from 2012 to 2015, and was introduced to CrossFit by friends while a student there. He graduated from McGill with an honors degree, and went on to study chiropractic at the Canadian Memorial Chiropractic College in Toronto, graduating in 2019.

== Career ==
Vellner first competed in the CrossFit Open in 2013. In 2014, he finished well enough in the Open to qualify for the Canada East Regional, though he finished fifth and not enough to move on to the Games. The next year, in 2015, he qualified for his first CrossFit Games as a member of CrossFit Plateau. The team took home 5th in the East and 20th in the world at the 2015 CrossFit Games.

=== 2016–2018: Podium finishes ===
In 2016, Vellner earned his first CrossFit Games invite after finishing 8th in the World (1st in Canada) in the Worldwide Open and 3rd in the East Regional. Though his highest event finish was 2nd overall, Vellner finished 3rd place, and was named Rookie of the Year. After the Games, Vellner competed on Team Canada at the CrossFit Invitational, earning a 4th-place finish alongside Michele Letendre, Carol-Ann Reason-Thibault, and Brent Fikowski.

In 2017, Vellner made his 2nd individual CrossFit Games appearance. He placed 11th in the Worldwide Open, earning a spot at the East Regional, where he finished 2nd place. Vellner finished third in the CrossFit Games with two individual event wins after officials disqualified Ricky Garard for failing drug tests (Testolone and Endurobol) at the 2017 CrossFit Games.

In 2018, Patrick Vellner had his best Open finish, best Regionals finish, and best CrossFit Games finish, where he finished 5th, 1st, and 2nd respectively. He captured his 3rd event win of his career in the 9th Event of the weekend, Chaos.

=== 2019–2020 ===
2019 introduced the Sanctionals Circuit to the 2019 CrossFit Games qualification season. Although Vellner narrowly missed qualifying for the Games at the Open, his 1st place finish at Wodapalooza earned him a spot in the competition. He also competed at the Rogue Invitational later in the season where he finished 2nd. With no event finishes inside the Top 10, Vellner was cut after a penalty for stepping on the line in the 6th event, and finished 16th.

In the 2020 season, Vellner finished first Worldwide at the Open, which earned him a spot at the CrossFit Games. However, a quirk in the scoring system meant that despite finishing 1st in the world, he was not crowned the Canadian National Champion. He then compete at the Dubai CrossFit Championship, earning 2nd, repeat as the Wodapalooza Champion, and take home 1st in the Rogue Invitational, which moved online in response to the COVID-19 pandemic. During the online Stage 1 of the 2020 CrossFit Games, Vellner finished 9th, failing to qualify for the in-person Stage 2 event.

=== 2021–2023: Return to podium ===
The 2021 CrossFit Games season brought about additional changes to the qualifying process. Vellner finished 20th in the World and 13th in North America in the Worldwide Open, earning a spot in the Online Quarterfinal. During the quarterfinals, he finished 4th overall on the continent, earning a post in the semifinals. Travel restrictions between Canada and the United States, as well as in person event restrictions in Canada, meant that Vellner was forced to compete in the 2021 Atlas Games, which were conducted online. He took home 1st place, and a spot in the Games. Despite a disappointing finish in the 1st Event of the weekend, Vellner took home three event wins, bringing his career total to six, and earning 2nd place behind Justin Medeiros at the Games.

At the 2023 CrossFit Games, Vellner again finished in the podium after coming second to Jeffrey Adler. He won event 8 (Intervals) and was placed second in Event 11 (Parallel-bar Pull) and a number of top ten finishes in other events.

Vellner did not competed in the 2025 CrossFit Games. In February 2026, he announced his intention to retire after the 2026 CrossFit Games.

== Personal life ==
Vellner announced his engagement to Michelle Workun-Hill, a doctor, in October 2019. Their first son Owen William was born on June 11, 2021, and their second Ethan Avery in February 2024. They married in September 2021.

He worked part time as a chiropractor in Nanaimo, Vancouver Island in British Columbia. He moved to Chelsea, Quebec in 2024.

Vellner had a cardiac ablation procedure done to resolve an issue with atrial flutter before the 2026 CrossFit season.

== CrossFit Games results ==
| Year | Games | Regional | | Open (Worldwide) |
|---|---|---|---|---|
| 2013 | — | — | | 7284th |
| 2014 | — | 5th (Canada East) | | 1200th |
| 2015 | 20th Team (CrossFit Plateau) | 5th Team (East); CrossFit Plateau | | 548th (World) |
| 2016 | 3rd | 3rd (East) | | 8th (World) |
| 2017 | 3rd | 2nd (East) | | 11th (World) |
| 2018 | 2nd | 1st (East) | | 5th (World) |
| Year | Games | Sanctional | | Open |
| 2019 | 16th | 1st (Wodapalooza); 2nd (Rogue Invitational) | | 30th (World) |
| 2020 | 9th (Stage 1) | 2nd (Dubai CrossFit Championship); 1st (Wodapalooza) | | 1st (World) 2nd (Canada) |
| Year | Games | Semifinal | Quarterfinal | Open |
| 2021 | 2nd | 1st (Atlas Games) | 4th (North America) | 20th (World); 13th (North America) |
| 2022 | 6th | 2nd (Atlas Games) | 10th (Worldwide); 7th (North America) | 69th (Worldwide); 43rd (North America) |
| 2023 | 2nd | 1st (North America West) | 2nd (Worldwide); 2nd (North America West) | 195th (Worldwide); 47th (North America West) |
| 2024 | 5th | 4th (North America West) | 140th (Worldwide); 22nd (North America West) | 10th (Worldwide); 2nd (North America West) |
| 2026 | 17th | 7th | 41st | 211th |
"—" denotes competitions Vellner did not participate in
