= Justin Medeiros =

American CrossFit athlete

Personal information
- Born: March 3, 1999 (age 27)
- Occupation: CrossFit Athlete
- Height: 5 ft 9 in (175 cm)
- Weight: 190 lb (86 kg)

Sport
- Sport: CrossFit
Medal record
Representing United States
CrossFit Games
Gold medal – first place	2022 Madison	Men
Gold medal – first place	2021 Madison	Men
Bronze medal – third place	2020 Aromas	Men
Rogue Invitational
Gold medal – first place	2021	Men
Gold medal – first place	2022	Men

Justin Medeiros is an American professional CrossFit athlete. He is the winner of the 2021 and 2022 CrossFit Games.

== Early life ==
Medeiros was born to Shanna and Anthony Medeiros from Lodi, California, and he has two sisters, Megan and Jessica. He was a student at Lodi High School where he was a wrestler and football player. He took up wrestling after encouragement from his parents as he was not athletic at the time. He started CrossFit when he was in seventh grade aged 12 in order to keep himself fit between sports seasons, but became more interested in the sport and dropped football for CrossFit after his high school sophomore year. He attended Boise State University where he majored in kinesiology. He focused on CrossFit while at Boise because it had cut its wrestling program. He then moved to Vancouver, Washington to be with his coach Adam Neiffer as courses were made online for a year due to the COVID-19 pandemic, before returning to Boise to complete his education in 2021.

== Career ==
Medeiros was a wrestler and competed in various competitions in California, including the Sac-Joaquin Section Masters Tournament and the California Interscholastic Federation State Wrestling Championships.

Medeiros first competed in the teen division (16–17) in 2016. He finished 19th and failed to reach the 2016 CrossFit Games. He then won the 16-to-18 year old age division at the Wodapalooza CrossFit competition held in Miami in 2017. At the age of 18, Medeiros competed in individual competition at the California Regional, and was placed 15th. This is followed by a 14th-place finish in the West Regional in 2018. In 2019, he just failed to qualify for the CrossFit Games when he finished 4th at the Granite Games.

=== 2020: Games debut ===
In 2019, Medeiros earned qualification to the 2020 CrossFit Games after winning the Filthy 150 Sanctional. After competing in an online phase 1 of the Games, he became one of only five athletes who competed in person at the Games, and was named Rookie of the Year. He finished third after Mat Fraser and Samuel Kwant at the Games.

=== 2021–22: CrossFit Games champion ===
In his second CrossFit Games in 2021, Medeiros performed consistently across all 15 events of the Games, with the lowest placing being 15th in the 1,000 meter row. He did not take over the overall lead until event 7, extending his lead with a second-place finish in event 8. He held on to this lead, although he still faced challenges from Patrick Vellner and Brent Fikowski in subsequent events. Medeiros eventually pulled away and sealed his victory with his first ever event win in the final event, beating Patrick Vellner by 82 points to be crowned champion, At the age of 22, Medeiros is the youngest man to have won the Games.

In off-season competitions, Medeiros also won the 2021 Rogue Invitational.

At the 2022 CrossFit Games, Medeiros faced strong challenges from Ricky Garard, who returned after a 4-year ban for drug use, and Roman Khrennikov, who competed in person for the first time despite qualifying for the Games 4 previous times. Garard led the first two days of competition, but faltered in some events and lost the lead to Medeiros. While Medeiros did not win any event this year, his consistent performance at the Games (10 top 5 finishes, only 2 events outside top 10 finishes) allowed him to win the crown for the second time this year.

Medeiros also won the 2022 Rogue Invitational.

=== 2023 ===
At the 2023 CrossFit Games, Medeiros fell from the bike in the "Ride" event, finishing in 29th place. He then finished 37th in the 2nd event, and these were his two worst-ever event finishes. Although he did well in a few events, he could not recover fully from the deficit, and finished the competition in 13th place.

== CrossFit Games results ==
Year	Games	Regionals		Open
2016	—	—		19th (Teenage Boys 16–17)
2017	—	15th (California Regional)		384th
2018	—	14th (West Regional)		217th
Year	Games	Sanctional		Open
2019	—	4th (Granite Games)		119th
2020	3rd	1st (Filthy 150)		68th
Year	Games	Semifinal	Quarterfinal	Open
2021	1st	3rd (MACC)	6th (North America)	57th (Worldwide); 36th (North America)
2022	1st	1st (Syndicate Crown)	1st (Worldwide); 1st (North America)	3rd (Worldwide); 3rd (North America)
2023	13th	5th (North America West)	1st (Worldwide); 1st (North America West)	78th (Worldwide); 17th (North America West)
2024	8th	1st (North America West)	12th (Worldwide) 1st (North America West)	30th (Worldwide) 6th (North America West)
2025	7th	8th (Individual semifinal)		11th (Worldwide) 2nd (North America West)
2026				13th (Worldwide) 4th (North America West)
"—" denotes stages of the competition Medeiros did not participate in
