= Laura Horvath =

Hungarian CrossFit athlete (born 1997)

Personal information
- Born: March 21, 1997 (age 29) Budapest, Hungary
- Occupation: CrossFit Athlete
- Height: 1.70 m (5.6 ft)
- Weight: 70 kg (150 lb)
- Website: Laura Horvath

Sport
- Sport: CrossFit,Olympic Weightlifting
Medal record
CrossFit Games
Gold medal – first place	2023	Women
Silver medal – second place	2021	Women
Silver medal – second place	2018	Women
Bronze medal – third place	2022	Women
Rogue Invitational
Gold medal – first place	2022	Women
Gold medal – first place	2023	Women
Gold medal – first place	2025	Women
Silver medal – second place	2024	Women
Silver medal – second place	2026	Women

Laura Horváth is a Hungarian professional CrossFit athlete. She won the 2023 CrossFit Games, earning the title "the fittest woman on earth". She has further won two silver medals in 2018 and 2021, and a bronze in 2022. She is also the three-time winner of Rogue Invitational.

Horvath has a background in the sport of climbing, but later switched to CrossFit. She qualified for her first CrossFit Games in 2018, coming second at the Games and was named Rookie of the Year. After two years outside the top 10, she again came second in 2021 and then third in 2022, before winning the title in 2023. Horvath also competes in Olympic weightlifting. She has won the national championship and she holds the national record for clean and jerk.

== Early life ==
Horvath was born to Ernő Horváth and Emese Szöllősi from Budapest, Hungary, both physical education teachers. She is the middle of three children, and has an elder brother Kristof, and a younger brother Botond. She played many sports when young but eventually settled on the sport of wall climbing. She was introduced to CrossFit by her brother Kristof in 2014, and initially used it to complement her training, but later became more involved in the sport.

== Career ==
Horvath was initially involved in the sport of climbing, and has won national titles. She also competed in European youth competitions.

=== CrossFit ===
Horvath was introduced to CrossFit in 2014 by her brother Kristof, and competed in her first CrossFit competition in 2015 at the Central European Throwdown where she managed to finish fourth. She competed in her first Open in 2015 a month later but finished only 25th in Hungary. The following year, she made the regional after placing 23rd in Europe at the Open. In 2017, she achieved her breakthrough in the sport after coming second in the Dubai Fitness Championship behind Annie Thorisdottir.

In 2018, Horvath became the first Hungarian woman to reach the CrossFit Games. She started well on the first day of the Games, and finished top of the leaderboard at the end of the first day. She also won her first ever event, The Battleground, in the second day. Defending champion Tia-Clair Toomey, however, came back strongly to win by 64 points, while Horvath came in comfortably at second place beating off Katrin Davidsdottir for the position. She was named Rookie of the Year.

At the Dubai Crossfit Championship held in December 2018, Horvath had to withdraw due to a back injury despite being the favorite to win. She nevertheless qualified for the 2019 Games as national champion, however, she was eliminated on the 3rd day after failing to make the cut for the top 10, and ending up in 14th place.

In the 2020 season disrupted by the COVID-19 pandemic, Horvath failed to reach the final stage of the revamped Games after finishing only 24th in the online stage of the Games.

After two disappointing seasons, Horvath moved to train with former champion Ben Smith. At the 2021 CrossFit Games, Horvath returned to the podium, again coming second behind Tia-Clair Toomey.

At the 2022 CrossFit Games, Horvath started poorly, but managed to climb back up the leaderboard with wins and good placements in the final two days, eventually finishing third behind Tia-Clair Toomey and Mal O'Brien. Two months later she won the 2022 Rogue Invitational. In January 2023, she took part in the team competition at Wodapalooza with Jamie Simmonds and Gabriela Migala and won.

At the 2023 CrossFit Games, Horvath trailed Emma Lawson for large part of the Games, but managed three consecutive wins in the last four events to capture her first title at the Games. At the 2023 Rogue Invitational, she beat Tia-Clair Toomey who did not compete at the Games to claim first place at the competition.

Horvath did not defend her title after she withdrew from the 2024 CrossFit Games due the death of Lazar Đukić from drowning. She criticized the CrossFit Games and blamed them for the death Đukić. Later in the year at the 2024 Rogue Invitational, Horvath won 4 events in a row, but failed to beat Tia-Clair Toomey for the title and came second.

Horvath did not take part in the 2025 CrossFit Games. Later in the year, she won the 2025 Rogue Invitational for the third time. She also won the inaugural World Fitness Project (WFP) in December 2025.

=== Olympic Weightlifting ===
Horvath competed at the 2021 European Weightlifting Championships in the -76 kg category lifting 89 kg in the snatch and 111 kg in clean and jerk a total of 200 kg and 9th place.

In March 2023, Horvath competed in the Savaria Cup weightlifting competition and won the 76 kg category with a lift of 117 kg in clean and jerk, improving the national record by 1 kg (total 206 kg).

In November 2023, Horvath competed in the Hungary National Championship in weightlifting and won in her weight class with a total of 215 kg, setting a new national record in clean and jerk at 120 kg.

In 2024 she lifted at 2024 European Weightlifting Championships 90 kg in the snatch and 115 kg in the clean and jerk, the total of 205 kg placed her 6th in the -76 kg category. She won the 2024 Hungary National Championship with 202 kg. Horvath competed at 2024 World Weightlifting Championships in Manama, Bahrain. She lifted 93 kg in the snatch and 115 kg in the clean and jerk, the total of 208 kg placed her 18th in the -76kg category.

== CrossFit Games results ==
Year	Games	Regionals		Open
2015	—	—		25th (Hungary)
2016	—	7th (Meridian)		190th (Worldwide); 23rd (Europe)
2017	—	11th (Meridian)		44th (Worldwide); 10th (Europe)
2018	2nd	2nd (Europe)		18th (Worldwide); 4th (Europe North)
Year	Games	Sanctional		Open
2019	14th			234th
2020	24th	1st (Strength in Depth)		10th
Year	Games	Semifinal	Quarterfinal	Open
2021	2nd	2nd (Lowlands Throwdown)	1st (Europe)	52nd (Worldwide); 14th (Europe)
2022	3rd	1st (Lowlands Throwdown)	21st (Worldwide); 9th (Europe)	103rd (Worldwide); 34th (Europe)
2023	1st	3rd (Europe)	2nd (Worldwide); 1st (Europe)	185th (Worldwide); 59th (Europe)
2024	WD	1st (Europe)	4th (Worldwide); 2nd (Europe)	62nd (Worldwide); 28th (Europe)
"—" denotes stages of the competition Horvath did not participate in

== Weightlifting Achievements ==
Year	Venue	Weight	Snatch (kg)				Clean & Jerk (kg)				Total	Rank
Year	Venue	Weight	1	2	3	Rank	1	2	3	Rank	Total	Rank
World Championships
2024	Manama, Bahrain	76 kg	87	90	93	17	109	~~114~~	115	18	208	18
European Championships
2021	Moscow, Russia	76 kg	86	89	~~91~~	10	108	~~111~~	111	9	200	9
2024	Sofia, Bulgaria	76 kg	90	~~94~~	~~94~~	7	~~115~~	115	~~119~~	4	205	6
2025	Chișinău, Moldova	76.00	87	90	92	15	111	114	~~118~~	16	206	15
