= Wodapalooza =

Annual fitness festival in Miami, Florida

Wodapalooza Miami

Tournament information
- Sport: CrossFit
- Location: United States
- Established: 2012; 14 years ago
- Number of tournaments: 10
- Format: Multi-event competition
- Purse: $567,000 (2025)
- Website: Wodapalooza

Current champion
- Elite men: James Sprague; Elite women: Lucy Campbell; Elite team men: Team GOWOD; Elite team women: Just Girls

Wodapalooza Fitness Festival (WZA) is an annual four-day functional fitness festival held in Miami centered on a CrossFit competition. The event was first established in 2012 and has since developed into one of the largest fitness festival in the world and a major CrossFit competition with thousands of athletes from around the world competing. In 2024, a new competition and fitness festival, TYR Wodapalooza SoCal, was held on Huntington Beach in California. A third competition will be added in Mexico City in 2026.

== History ==
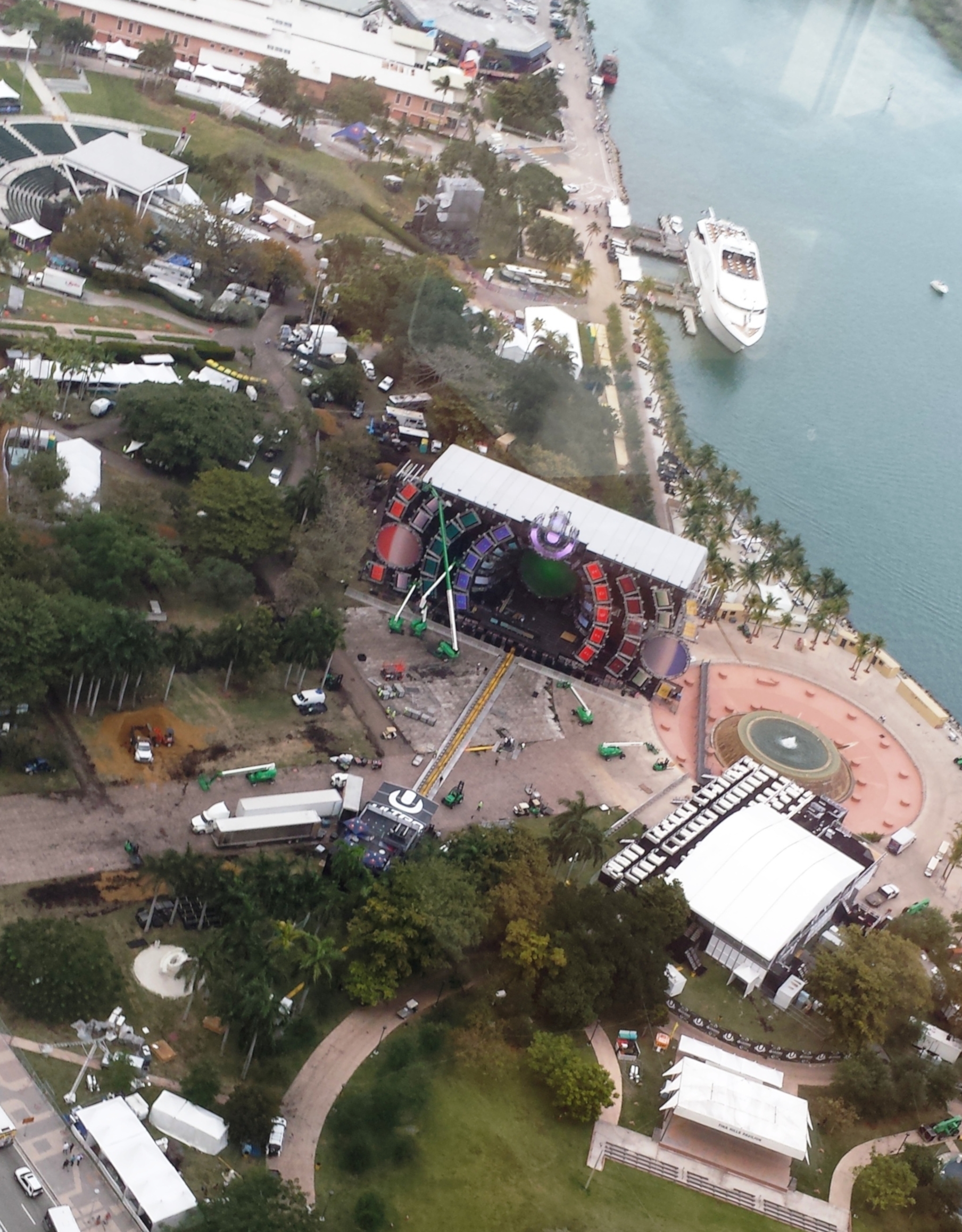
Bayfront Park, where Wodapalooza was held 2012–2024

Wodapalooza was founded in 2012 by Guido Trinidad and Steve Suarez. They were originally intended to run CrossFit classes at Bayfront Park in the summer of 2011, but were offered the possibility of turning it into a competition event by the park manager. The first competition of "Wodapalooza Miami – A Fitness Festival" was a single-day competition held on Saturday, February 4, 2012, with some preliminary events the previous day. The competition is named after "WOD" or CrossFit's "Workout of the Day", while "palooza" denotes a festival or large-scale event. The first Wodapalooza had 145 participating athletes and 500 spectators.

The event proved highly popular and it quickly expanded in the following years. The number of athletes competing increased to 507 the second year, over 1,300 in 2016, around 2,000 by 2019, and over 3,000 by 2022. Due to increasing participation, the number of competing athletes at the competition had to be limited and an online qualification stage was introduced starting in 2014 for those who did not receive an invitation to compete. The number of days of competition increased to two in 2013 (Saturday and Sunday), and eventually to four (Thursday to Sunday) by 2017, and the number of competition stages at the venue also increased to four. The number of attendees rose to 7,000 in 2015, 30,000 in 2017, and up to 40,000 by 2022. The prize purse also experienced similar growth; the total prize purse increased from $5,000 in the first year, $10,000 in 2014, to $500,000 in 2022. The 2022 event featured the biggest prize purse yet with the elite individual winners receiving $100,000, up from $50,000 the previous competition.

Although the competition events for elite athletes are the main focus, Wodapalooza also provides fitness competitions for athletes of different age range and abilities from the early days. In 2015, Wodapalooza became the first major functional fitness competition to offer an adaptive division for athletes with disabilities and impairement. There were 50 divisions by 2022.

Trinidad and Suarez partnered with Loud and Live in 2017 to run the Wodapalooza event in 2018. Loud and Live then acquired Wodapalooza in the months following the event.

In October 2018, Wodapalooza was announced as a sanctioned event for the 2019 CrossFit Games where the winner can earn qualification for the Games. Its name was changed from Wodapalooza Fitness Festival Miami (used since 2014) to Wodapalooza CrossFit Festival for the next two seasons. To comply with the format for teams at the CrossFit Games, a mixed teams of four was added in addition to its usual teams of three separated by gender in 2019. In 2020, the event was moved from January of previous years to February, and there was no competition for elite teams of three.

The 2021 event was cancelled due to the ongoing COVID-19 pandemic. The organizer of the event also opted not to be part of the CrossFit Games season in the following year, and moved the event back to January. The 2022 event was streamed live free for the first time in 2022.

Wodapalooza announced a change to its format for the 2023 event, with elite individual athletes competing over two days on Thursday and Friday, and the elite teams competing over the final two days on Saturday and Sunday, allowing individual athletes to compete in both the individual and team competitions. Cuts in the number of competitors during the competition were also introduced this year, and the top prize for the individual winners was reduced to $75.000. This year is the first to have a title sponsor, TYR, with the festival branded TYR Wodapalooza Fitness Festival this year.

For 2024, Wodapalooza partnered with seven Latin American competitions and created a separate division for Latin American athletes, the LatAm Cup. Wodapalooza also announced that a second competition would be added on the west coast, to be held September 20–22, 2024 in Huntington Beach in California. The TYR Wodapalooza SoCal competition introduces the TYR Cup, to be contested by two teams (North America vs the World), each with four men and four women competing in a head-to-head format. The competition has a prize purse of $250,000, with the winning team receiving $160,000.

Due to the limitation on spectator capacity at Bayfront park, the location of the festival was moved to Miami Beach, Florida in 2025. In 2026, the number of elite individuals was capped at 20 men and 20 women. A further competition location in Mexico City is planned for December 2026.

== Venues ==
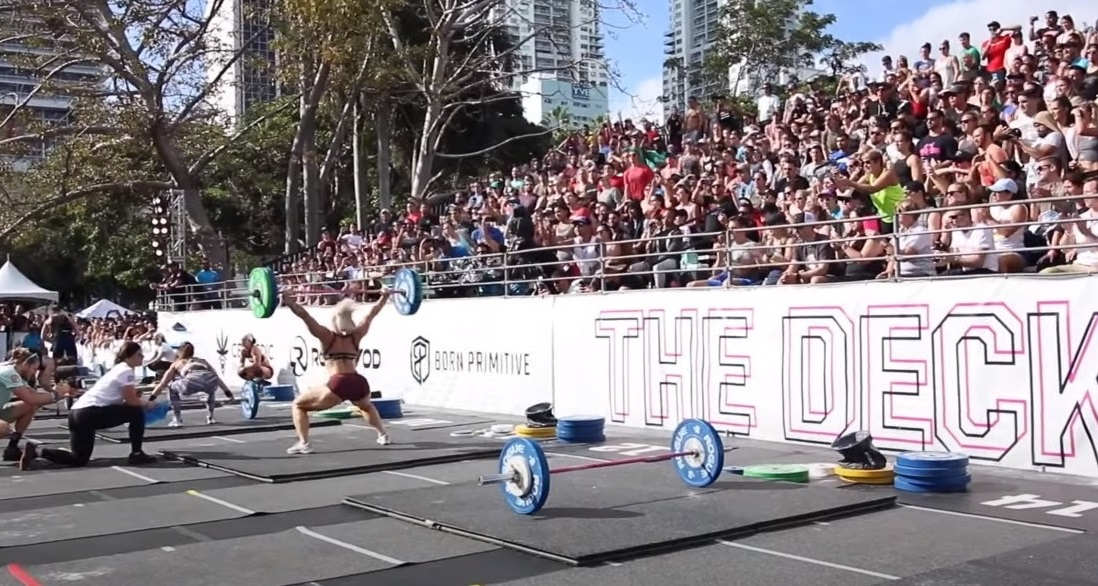
An event at The Deck, Wodapalooza in 2019

From 2012 to 2024, Wodapalooza was held at the Bayfront Park fronting Biscayne Bay in Miami. It featured four stages for competition: Flagler; Bayside; The Deck; and Tina Hill. The Flagler stage was the biggest with a seating capacity of 5,000. The Gauntlet was held at the Deck.

For the TYR Wodapalooza at Miami Beach, the three primary venues are the TYR Arena, Dymatize Lifting Stage, and Reign Sandbox. There is also a Gauntlet Stage.

== Competitions ==
There are 48 divisions of CrossFit competitions at Wodapalooza, ranging from the elite men and women to various age and adaptive divisions. The team competitions feature three-member teams of men and women. The LATAM Cup featuring athletes from the Latin American countries has been held since 2024.

Wodapalooza may also host a variety of events, such as Weightlifting Faceoff, a one-day Olympic lifting competition; WZA Strong, a competition that mixes strongman and functional fitness movements. Every year individuals can take part in The Gauntlet where they perform three different workouts in an hour.

== Events ==
Eight or nine scored events were typically held for the individual and team CrossFit competitions until 2023 when the schedule was changed allowing athletes to compete in individual and team competitions. Six events are usually held for the elite competitions. The events are typically combinations of various CrossFit-type movements in weightlifting, gymnastics and monostructural workouts. Wodapalooza always features an event that features swimming.

== Winners ==
Year	Elite individuals		Elite teams	
Year	Men	Women	Men	Women
2012		—		
2013				
2014		Samantha Briggs		
2015	Noah Ohlsen	Samantha Briggs	RX Smart Gear: Wes Piatt; Jon Pera; Nick Urankar	
2016	Noah Ohlsen	Brooke Wells	Co-Champs Athletigen: Mitch Barnard; Brent Fikowski; Albert Larouche; CrossFit Shrewsbury: Corey Lunney; Anthony Vazquez; Trevor James	Two Grown Ups and The Kid: Val Voboril; Regan Huckaby; Maddie Myers
2017	Noah Ohlsen	Camille Leblanc-Bazinet	Misfit nLnM: Jordan Cook; Travis Williams; Chandler Smith	Team Progenex: Stacie Tovar; Emily Bridgers; Chyna Cho
2018	Streat Hoerner	Katrín Davíðsdóttir	Team Quebec: Alexandre Caron; Albert-Dominic Larouche; Alex Vigneault	Team Progenex: Chyna Cho; Lauren Fisher; Emily Bridgers
2019	Patrick Vellner	Tia-Clair Toomey	Foodspring Athletics: Adrian Mundwiler; Björgvin Karl Guðmundsson; Jonne Koski	Cass, Jenn, and Kristi: Cassidy Lance-McWherter; Jennifer Smith; Kristi Eramo
2019	Patrick Vellner	Tia-Clair Toomey	Team ROMWOD / WIT: Jamie Greene; Jessica Griffith; Cody Mooney; Alec Smith	
2020	Patrick Vellner	Tia-Clair Toomey	Mayhem Freedom: Rich Froning Jr.; Scott Panchik; Chyna Cho; Tasia Percevecz	
2022	Patrick Vellner	Emma McQuaid	The Boys: Noah Ohlsen; Travis Mayer; Chandler Smith	Team Kriger: Kristin Holte; Lena Richter; Ingrid Hodnemyr
2023	Ricky Garard	Paige Powers	Canadian PB&J: Patrick Vellner; Brent Fikowski; Jeffrey Adler	Team BPN: Laura Horvath; Jamie Simmonds; Gabriela Migala
2024	Ricky Garard	Emma Cary	Team GOWOD: Justin Medeiros; Jay Crouch; Willy Georges	Stronger Than A 90's Trend: Kelly Baker; Kelsey Kiel; Emelie Lundberg
2025	James Sprague	Lucy Campbell	The Boys: Noah Ohlsen; Travis Mayer; Chandler Smith	Yeti OutKasts: Emma Lawson; Danielle Brandon; Shelby Neal
2026	James Sprague	Lucy Campbell	Team GOWOD: Justin Medeiros; Dallin Pepper; Jayson Hopper	Just Girls: Gabriela Migała; Alexis Raptis; Page Rodgers

=== TYR Cup ===
Year	2024	2025
Team World	6: Tia Clair Toomey; Emma Tall; Gracie Walton; Seher Kaya; Gui Malheiros; Björgvin Karl Gudmundsson; Aniol Ekai; Brent Fikowski	11: Tia Clair Toomey; Emma Tall; Gracie Walton; Aimee Cringle; Gui Malheiros; Roman Khrennikov; Ricky Garard; Jay Crouch
Team North America	7: Danielle Brandon; Alexis Raptis; Arielle Loewen; Emily Rolfe; Justin Medeiros; Pat Vellner; Jeff Adler; Dallin Pepper	14: Danielle Brandon; Alexis Raptis; Emma Lawson; Olivia Kerstetter; Justin Medeiros; Pat Vellner; Jayson Hopper; Dallin Pepper

== See also ==
- CrossFit Games
- Rogue Invitational
