= 2023 CrossFit Games =

Athletic competition

- Venue: Alliant Energy Center
- Location: Madison, Wisconsin
- Dates: August 1–August 6, 2023

Champions
- Men: (Canada) Jeffrey Adler
- Women: (Hungary) Laura Horvath
- Team: (United States) CrossFit Invictus

The 2023 CrossFit Games is the 17th edition of the premier competition in the sport of CrossFit held from August 1 to August 6, 2023, in Madison, Wisconsin. The winners were Laura Horvath for the women's competition, Jeffrey Adler for the men's, and CrossFit Invictus for the team's.

The qualification process for the 2023 CrossFit Games was adjusted this season, and a worldwide ranking of athletes was introduced for the determination additional qualifying spots for the CrossFit Games. All the workouts for the semifinals will also be standardized and programmed by CrossFit. This Games is the final one to be held in Madison, Wisconsin since it was first held there in 2017. The prize purse increased to $2.945 million this year, with the winners receiving $315,000.

This year a number of top female athletes from 2022 did not compete at the Games, including the women champion Tia-Clair Toomey due to pregnancy, and the runner-up Mal O'Brien. Laura Horvath trailed Emma Lawson for large part of the Games, but managed three consecutive wins in the last four events to capture her first title at the Games. The 2022 runner-up Roman Khrennikov led for most of the Games, but injured his foot in the final day of competition, and finished third to the eventual winner Jeffrey Adler. After several years of absence, ESPN returned as broadcaster for the Games with live coverage on ESPN, ESPN2 and ESPN+.

== Qualifications ==
There are three qualification stages as before, but the number of competition regions has been reduced from 10 to seven: North American East, North American West, Europe, Africa, Asia, Australia and South America. Athletes are required to compete in their respective competition regions, but special exemptions are awarded to some athletes who applied for them. A new world ranking system was introduced, and athletes can acquire points across all four stages of the competition: the CrossFit Open, Quarterfinals, Semifinals, and Games over a two-year period. The ranking was used to determine the strength of field of the semifinals and additional qualification places for the Games would be awarded based on the strength of field of the semifinals. The online Occupational Games created in 2021 was removed this year.

=== Open ===
The Open began on February 16, 2023, with a live announcement in Madrid, Spain. It lasted three weeks until March 6 and had four scored workouts, with the 23.2 test split into two. This year the figure for Open participation increased by around 10% again, to 323,014. The Open was won by Mal O'Brien and Jeff Adler.

=== Quarterfinals ===
As with 2022 season, the top 10% of the Open participants and top 25% of team in each continent qualify for the Quarterfinals. The top 60 women, top 60 men and the top 40 teams in the North American East, North American West and European regions will proceed to the semifinals. For the Africa, Asia, Australia and South America regions, the top 30 women and men, and the top 20 teams, will compete in their respective semifinals.

The Quartfinals started on 16 March 2023 with all five individual workouts released, to be completed and the results submitted by participating athletes on specified time periods until 19 March. The team Quarterfinals followed from March 29 through March 30, and age group from March 31 through April 1. Mal O'Brien and Justin Medeiros were the respective individual female and male overall winners of the quarterfinals.

=== Semifinals ===
The number of competitions has been reduced from 10 to 7, with the number in North America and Europe reduced to two and one respectively, while the continents of Africa, Asia, Australia and South America would have one each as before. CrossFit itself will run the three competitions in North America and Europe. All the workouts for the Semifinals will also be standardized, a return to the system used for the Regionals. There will be no Last Chance Qualifiers, instead a world ranking system was introduced, and the number of qualifying places will be allocated based on the strength of the field in each of the Semifinals as determined by the ranking system. Five qualification places are guaranteed for each of the North American and European competitions, three for Oceania, two each for Asia and South America, and Africa one. Of the 17 remaining qualifications spots, the D'Hondt method would be used to determine the number of qualifiers of each region based on the top 100 ranking of their participants after the conclusion of the Quarterfinals.

The Semifinals are scheduled to take place over four weekends between 28 April and 4 June, starting with the Age Group Semifinal held online. The in-person live competitions for the Individual and Team Semifinals are to be held starting May 18. Due to the higher number of competitors in North America and Europe, the three Semifinals for these regions would be held over four days, while the other Semifinals would be held over three days. The cash prize for the winners of the semifinals doubled to $10,000 this season.

== Qualifiers ==
=== Individuals ===
North America East (May 18–21) Orlando, Florida, United States		North America West (May 25–28) Pasadena, California, United States		Europe (June 1–4) Berlin, Germany	
Men	Women	Men	Women	Men	Women
(Canada) Jeffrey Adler (United States) Jayson Hopper (United States) Dallin Pepper (Authorised Neutral Athletes) Roman Khrennikov (Note: Khrennikov is Russian, but competed representing Cookeville, Tennessee and its CrossFit Mayhem because of CrossFit policy.) (Canada) Samuel Cournoyer (United States) Will Moorad (United States) Noah Ohlsen (United States) Luke Parker (Canada) Alex Vigneault (Canada) Jack Farlow (United States) James Sprague (United States) Spencer Panchik	(United States) Emma Cary (United States) Danielle Brandon (United States) Amanda Barnhart (Canada) Emma Lawson (United States) Alexis Raptis (United States) Paige Powers (United States) Sydney Wells (United States) Feeroozeh Saghafi (United States) Shelby Neal (United States) Caroline Stanley (United States) Paige Semenza	(Canada) Patrick Vellner (Canada) Brent Fikowski (United States) Samuel Kwant (United States) Cole Greashaber (United States) Justin Medeiros (United States) Chandler Smith (United States) Nick Mathew (United States) Colten Mertens (United States) Cole Sager	(United States) Alex Gazan (Iceland) Katrín Davíðsdóttir (United States) Arielle Loewen (United States) Christine Kolenbrander (United States) Bethany Shadburne (Canada) Emily Rolfe (United States) Olivia Kerstetter (United States) Abigail Domit (United States) Baylee Rayl (United States) Kelly Baker	(Serbia) Lazar Đukić (Finland) Henrik Haapalainen (Germany) Moritz Fiebig (Belgium) Jelle Hoste (Finland) Jonne Koski (Latvia) Uldis Upenieks (United Kingdom) David Shorunke (Iceland) Björgvin Karl Guðmundsson (Poland) Bronisław Olenkowicz (Poland) Michał Wesołowski (Spain) Fabian Beneito	(Poland) Gabriela Migała (Iceland) Anníe Þórisdóttir (Hungary) Laura Horvath (Sweden) Emma Tall (Slovakia) Karin Freyová (Norway) Matilde Ǿyen Garnes (Belgium) Manon Angonese (Sweden) Ella Wunger (Italy) Elisa Fuliano (Republic of Ireland) Emma McQuaid (Sweden) Rebecka Vitesson

Africa (May 19–21) Johannesburg, South Africa		Oceania (May 25–28) Brisbane, Australia		South America (May 26–28) Rio de Janeiro, Brazil		Asia (June 1–4) Busan, South Korea	
Men	Women	Men	Women	Men	Women	Men	Women
(South Africa) ~~Jason Smith~~ (Note: Jason Smith failed the drug test but the second-placed finisher did not replace Smith due to injury.)	(South Africa) Michelle Basnett	(Australia) Jay Crouch (New Zealand) Bayley Martin (Australia) Jake Douglas	(Australia) Ellie Turner (New Zealand) Jamie Simmonds (Australia) Emily de Rooy	(Brazil) Kaique Cerveny (Brazil) Kalyan Souza	(Brazil) Victoria Campos (Argentina) Alexia Williams	(Authorised Neutral Athletes) Arthur Semenov ^{A} ~~(Iran) Morteza Sedaghat~~ (Note: Morteza Sedaghat was unable to attend due to visa issue.) (China) Ant Haynes (Note: Ant Haynes replaced Morteza Sedaghat.)	(Turkey) Seher Kaya (United Arab Emirates) Shahad Budebs

Representation by Nation
- United States (32)
- Canada (8)
- Australia (4)
- Brazil (3)
- Iceland (3)
- Poland (3)
- Sweden (3)
- ANA (2)
- Belgium (2)
- Finland (2)
- New Zealand (2)
- Argentina (1)
- China PR (1)
- Germany (1)
- Hungary (1)
- Ireland (1)
- Italy (1)
- Latvia (1)
- Norway (1)
- Serbia (1)
- Slovakia (1)
- South Africa (1)
- Spain (1)
- Turkey (1)
- United Arab Emirates (1)
- United Kingdom (1)

- ^{^A}On March 1, 2022, CrossFit announced they will not recognise athletes from Russia or Belarus as a result of Russian violations of the Olympic truce through invasion of Ukraine during the binding truce. Athletes thereby will compete as neutral athletes. This rule continues to be in effect during the 2023 CrossFit Games.

=== Qualified teams ===
North America East (May 18–21) Orlando, Florida, United States	North America West (May 25–28) Pasadena, California, United States	Europe (June 1–4) Berlin, Germany
(United States) East Nashville PRVN (United States) Move Fast Lift Heavy 247 (United States) AB-CrossFit Mayhem (United States) Mayhem Independence (United States) Krypton (United States) CLT The Grit Haus (United States) OBA (United States) TTT CrossFit Black (Canada) PSC Invasion (United States) Milford Team Conquer	(United States) Franco's Misfits (United States) Invictus (United States) Omnia (United States) Kilo II (United States) Koda CrossFit Redemption (United States) Invictus Unconquerable (United States) Rhino CrossFit Dawgs (United States) Invictus Sea of Green (United States) Einhorn CrossFit Ascend (United States) Believe	(Denmark) No Shortcuts (Norway) Oslo Navy Blue (Sweden) Walleye Athlete (Norway) Oslo Blackout (France) Genas (Sweden) Prestanda (Finland) Portti (Norway) Trondheim (Norway) Oslo NAJS (United Kingdom) Rotherham

Africa (May 19–21) Johannesburg, South Africa	Oceania (May 25–28) Brisbane, Australia	South America (May 26–28) Rio de Janeiro, Brazil	Asia (June 1–4) Busan, South Korea
(South Africa) ~~FBDV Mayhem Africa~~ (Note: A team member of FBDV Mayhem Africa failed the drug test.) (South Africa) Cape CrossFit Wolfpack (Note: Cape CrossFit Wolfpack replaced FBDV Mayhem Africa)	(Australia) Torian Mayhem (New Zealand) 64Army Endgame (Australia) PFC CrossFit 3076	(Brazil) Templo SA Blacksheep Treta (Argentina) Q21	(United Arab Emirates) Fly High Kolesnikov (South Korea) Marvel Black

Representation by Nation
- United States (19)
- Norway (4)
- Australia (2)
- Sweden (2)
- Argentina (1)
- Brazil (1)
- Canada (1)
- Denmark (1)
- Finland (1)
- France (1)
- New Zealand (1)
- South Africa (1)
- South Korea (1)
- United Arab Emirates (1)
- United Kingdom (1)

== Individual competitions ==
The individual competitions of the CrossFit Games was held starting Thursday August 3, 2023 in Madison. The field was cut from 40 to 30 at the end of Friday, and from 30 to 20 at the end of Saturday.

=== August 3, 2023 ===
==== Event 1: Ride ====
Complete as many laps as possible in 40 minutes on a Trek Bikes Marlin 8 mountain bike.

==== Event 2: Pig Chipper ====
For Time:

10 Pig Flips

25 Chest-to-bar pull-ups

50 Toes-to-bars

100 Wall-ball shots (14/20 lb, 9/10 ft)

50 Toes-to-bar

25 Chest-to-bar pull-ups

10 Pig Flips

==== Event 3: Inverted Medley ====
For time:

30-foot unbroken handstand walk over the ramp

8 free-standing handstand push-ups

Unbroken obstacle steps to a 180° pirouette

16 pull-overs

Unbroken obstacle steps to a 360° pirouette

8 free-standing handstand push-ups

30-foot unbroken handstand walk over the ramp

=== August 4, 2023 ===
==== Event 4: The Alpaca Redux ====
For time:

126-foot sled push, starting with all six kettlebells (443/546 lb)

Then 3 rounds for time:

2 legless rope climbs

12 kettlebell clean and jerks (53/70 lb)

42-foot sled push, starting with two kettlebells*

*add two kettlebells to the sled after each round

==== Event 5: Ski-Bag ====
For time:

30-Calorie SkiErg

30 sandbag squats (125/200 lb)

20-Calorie SkiErg

20 sandbag squats

==== Event 6: Helena ====
3 Rounds for Time:

400 meter run

12 bar muscle-ups

21 dumbbell snatches (35/50 lb)

=== August 5, 2023 ===
==== Event 7:Cross-Country 5K ====
For Time:

Run 5k

Time Cap: 30 min

==== Event 8: Intervals ====
2 intervals for total time:

21 box jump-overs (20/24 inches)

15-calorie row

9 burpee box jump-overs (36/48 inches)

21 box jump-overs

15-calorie row

9 burpee box jump-overs

Rest until 6-minute mark, then:

9 burpee box jump-overs

15-calorie row

21 box jump-overs

9 burpee box jump-overs

15-calorie row

21 box jump-overs

Time Cap: 12 minutes

==== Event 9: Olympic Total ====
For Load:

1-rep-max snatch

1-rep-max clean and jerk

Athletes will have two attempts at each lift. Time cap: 20 seconds per lift.

=== August 6, 2023 ===
==== Event 10: Muscle-up Logs ====
5 rounds for time:

7 muscle-ups

1 sandbag over 3 logs (Rounds 1-4 = (100/150 lb), Round 5 = (125/200 lb))

Time Cap: 13 minutes

==== Event 11: Parallel-bar Pull ====
8 rounds for time:

Down-and-back P-bar traverse

30 heavy-rope double-unders

1 section hand-over-hand sled pull

==== Event 12: Echo Thruster Final ====
For time:

21-18-15

Echo Bike calories

Thrusters (85/115 lb) (95/135 lb) (105/155 lb)

Then, 66-foot overhead walking lunge (105/155 lb)

== Team competition ==
The team competitions of the CrossFit Games was held starting Thursday August 3, 2023 in Madison. The field will be cut from 40 to 30 at the end of Friday, and from 30 to 20 at the end of Saturday.

=== August 3, 2023 ===
==== Event 1: 2-2-2-2 Redux ====
For time in M/F pairs:

Accumulate 175 overhead squats

Starting every 2 minutes:

12/9-calorie SkiErg each (M/F)

1 seated legless rope climb each (M/F)

Max-reps synchro overhead squats

When 2 minutes are up, the first pair stops working and returns while the second pair begins working.

Each pair will have 4 intervals to work (8 total intervals)..

==== Event 2: Ride Relay ====
With two bikes per team, max laps in one hour.

=== August 4, 2023 ===
==== Event 3: Olympic Total ====
For load:

1-rep-max snatch

1-rep-max clean and jerk

==== Event 4: Cross-Country 5K ====
For time:

Run 5K as a team.

==== Event 5: Bike, Row, Hold ====
For time:

150-calorie bike + handstand hold

125-calorie row + seated muscle-up and ring support

100-calorie bike + handstand hold

=== August 5, 2023 ===
==== Event 6: Run Lift Relay ====
Complete as many reps as possible in 3 minutes:

F1/M1

400-m shuttle run

Max-reps snatches (135/185 lb)

==== Event 7: Lift Run Relay ====
For time:

F2/M2

10 snatches (135/185 lb)

400-m shuttle run

==== Event 8: Muscle-Up Bob ====
For time:

Push Bob 126 feet (1,188 lb)

Then,

3 rounds of:

10 synchro muscle-ups

15 Worm clean and jerks (340 lb)

42-foot Bob push

==== Event 9: B-Bells and P-Bars ====
For time:

21/15/9 reps of synchro axle deadlifts, all 4 athletes (805 lb)

21/21/21 reps of synchro parallel-bar dips, pair 1 then pair 2

21/15/9 synchro sandbag squats, pair 2 then pair 1 (125/200 lb)

=== August 6, 2023 ===
==== Event 10: Bob's A Drag ====
4 rounds for time of:

500-meter run

Jerry carry

Log traverse

42-foot synchro Bob pull (66-foot pull on the final round)

==== Event 11: Handstand Worm ====
192-foot handstand walk each

Then,

10 Worm thrusters

24-foot Worm walking lunge

10 Worm thrusters

24-foot Worm walking lunge

10 Worm thrusters

24-foot Worm walking lunge

10 Worm thrusters

24-foot Worm walking lunge

10 Worm thrusters

== Podium finishers ==
=== Individuals and teams ===
Place	Men	Women	Team
1st	(Canada) Jeffrey Adler	(Hungary) Laura Horvath	(California) CrossFit Invictus
2nd	(Canada) Patrick Vellner	(Canada) Emma Lawson	(Tennessee) CrossFit East Nashville PRVN
3rd	(Authorised Neutral Athletes) Roman Khrennikov	(United States) Arielle Loewen	(Norway) CrossFit Oslo Navy Blue

=== Masters men ===
Place	35–39	40–44	45–49	50–54	55–59	60–64	65+
1st	(United States) Sam Dancer	(United States) Rudolph Berger	(United States) Jason Grubb	(Poland) Artur Komorowski	(United States) Kevin Koester	(United States) Stuart Swanson	(United States) Daniel Miller
2nd	(Greece) Ioannis Papadopoulos	(Canada) Michael Laverriere	(Authorised Neutral Athletes) Vlad Liashkevich	(United States) Sean Patrick	(United States) John Kim	(United States) Tom Fameree	(United States) David Hippensteel
3rd	(United States) Bryan Wong	(Portugal) Bruno Militao	(United States) Christopher Anderson	(United States) Jason Leeves	(United States) Ryan Joe Hamby	(United States) Eric Cohen	(United States) Tom Muhlbeier

=== Masters women ===
Place	35–39	40–44	45–49	50–54	55–59	60–64	65+
1st	(France) Laurie Clément	(United Kingdom) Samantha Briggs	(United Kingdom) Kelly Friel	(United States) Cheryl Brost	(United States) Leka Fineman	(Canada) Susan Clarke	(United States) Julie Holt
2nd	(United States) Stacie Tovar	(Brazil) Andreia Pinheiro	(Canada) Amy Chapoton	(United States) Nicole Abbott	(United States) Shanna Bunce	(United States) Betsy Vanderburgh	(United States) Dava Jensen
3rd	(United States) Colette Casey	(United States) Jenn Ryan	(Brazil) Carolina Gutierrez (Note: Carolina Gutierrez failed the drug test, which she said was due to prescribed medications for menopause.)	(Canada) Nathalie Connors	(Canada) Laurie Meschishnick	(Canada) Patricia McGill	(New Zealand) Pauline Sciascia

=== Teens ===
Place	14–15 Boys	14–15 Girls	16–17 Boys	16–17 Girls
1st	(United States) Jeremie Jourdan	(Guatemala) Maria Granizo	(United States) Ty Jenkins	(Republic of Ireland) Lucy McGonigle
2nd	(United States) Lincoln LaFaver	(United States) Miley Wade	(Sweden) Hugo Jansson	(United States) Trista Smith
3rd	(Spain) Pau Martin Tiers	(Hungary) Mira Varga	(United States) RJ Mestre	(Iceland) Bergrós Björnsdóttir

=== Adaptive divisions ===
Place	Men Upper Extremity	Women Upper Extremity	Men Lower Extremity	Women Lower Extremity	Men Neuromuscular	Women Neuromuscular
1st	(United States) Casey Acree	(United States) Christina Mazzullo	(New Zealand) Rogan Dean	(United States) Valerie Cohen	(United States) Chris Rhyme	(United States) Noelle Henderson
2nd	(France) Alexis Fiorucci	(France) Anne-Laure Coutenceau	(United States) Charles Pienaar	(Canada) Bayleigh Hooper	(United Kingdom) James Brown	(United States) Amea Reyna
3rd	(Spain) Xabier Osa Mendes	(Brazil) Elaine de Rocco	(Brazil) Hildon Carvalho	(United States) Molly Moore	(Uruguay) Mijail Pedrini	(United States) Jordan Ingalsbe
