= 2022 CrossFit Games =

Athletic competition

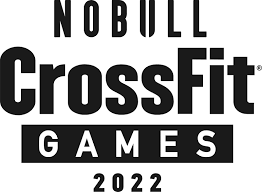
- Venue: Alliant Energy Center
- Location: Madison, Wisconsin
- Dates: August 3–August 7, 2022

Champions
- Men: (United States) Justin Medeiros
- Women: (Australia) Tia-Clair Toomey
- Team: (United States) CrossFit Mayhem Freedom

The 2022 CrossFit Games is the 16th iteration of the annual competition in the sport of CrossFit held from August 3 to August 7, 2022, in Madison, Wisconsin. Both Justin Medeiros and Tia-Clair Toomey repeated their 2021 win in their respective men's and women's competitions, while CrossFit Mayhem Freedom won the team competition.

The qualification process for the 2022 CrossFit Games was similar to the one used in 2021, starting with the Open, followed by the quarterfinals, the semifinals, and a last-chance qualifier. The prize pool increased to $2,845,000 across all divisions this year; the elite individual winners received the same prize money but for the first time, all 40 top men and women would receive a share of the prize purse, as well as podium finishers of five Adaptive divisions.

This season Justin Bergh became the general manager of sport and Adrian Bozman the director of competition, taking over from Dave Castro, who had been responsible for the Games since its inception. Bozman introduced a number of new movements at the Games which proved challenging for a number of athletes.

This season Roman Khrennikov participated in person at the Games for the first time despite qualifying for the Games four previous times, and Ricky Garard returned after a 4-year ban for drug use. Khrennikov and Garard was placed 2nd and 3rd respectively, with 2021 winner Justin Medeiros taking the crown for the second time in a tightly fought contest. On the women's side, Tia-Clair Toomey prevailed over challenger Mal O'Brien who, at the age of 18, became the youngest-ever competitor to reach the podium. Toomey's 6th consecutive win was a new record, making her the only person to win six individual titles at the Games.

== Qualification ==
The qualification system is broadly similar to that used for the 2021 CrossFit Games, with some adjustments.

=== Open ===
The Games season started with the Open, which took place over three weeks from February 24 to March 14, 2022. The number of athletes registered for the Open increased again this year to 294,980. This is the first Games season not to be programmed by Dave Castro after he was dismissed ahead of the Open, although the workouts for the Open were mostly similar to those pre-arranged by Castro with some modifications (e.g. the Shuttle Run was moved to the quarterfinal). Only three workouts were scheduled for this year's Open. Saxon Panchik and Mallory O'Brien were the respective male and female winners of the Open.

=== Quarterfinals ===
The top 10% of individual participants and top 25& of teams from the Open of each continent qualified for the Quarterfinals. The individual Quarterfinals were again held online like the Open, with 5 workouts released all at the same time to be completed by individual athletes from March 24 to March 27, but with the scores for individual workouts to be submitted at specified time. The team Quarterfinals were held on April 8–10, 2022, while the Age Group Quarterfinals were held on April 21–24, 2022. A new element, the Shuttle Run, was introduced this year for the individual quarterfinals, but caused some controversy after many failed to be penalized for not performing the unfamiliar workout correctly.

=== Semifinals ===
This year, in order to introduce some level of uniformity, all semifinal competitions would have six workouts each, two of which are identically programmed by CrossFit for all the semifinals. The prize purse for the semifinals remained the same as that for the 2021 Games. Athletes who qualified for multiple stages, such as Individual, Team, or Age Group, can only participate in one. Ten Semifinals were scheduled to be held on six continents over four weeks starting May 20, 2022: four in North America (Syndicate Crown, Mid-Atlantic CF Challenge, Granite Games, Atlas Games), two in Europe (Lowland Throwdown, Strength in Depth), one each in South America (CF Copa Sur), Asia (Far East Throwdown), Africa (Fittest In Cape Town), and Oceania (Torian Pro). 30 men, 30 women, and 20 teams competed in each semifinal. The number of qualifiers stayed unchanged from 2021: 5 men and women from each North American and European semifinal, three from Oceania, two from Asia and South America, and one from Africa.

The first ever Age Group Semifinal was held online, as were the Adaptive Divisions.

==== Qualified individuals ====
| Torian Pro (May 20–22) Queensland, Australia | Lowlands Throwdown (May 20–22) North Holland, Netherlands | Syndicate Crown (May 20–22) Tennessee, United States | Mid-Atlantic Challenge (May 26–29) Tennessee, United States | Fittest in Cape Town (May 26–29) Western Cape, South Africa |
|---|---|---|---|---|
| Women: (Australia) Tia-Clair Toomey; (Australia) Kara Saunders; (Australia) Ellie Turner; Men: (Australia) Jay Crouch; (Australia) Ricky Garard; (Australia) Bayden Brown | Women: (Hungary) Laura Horvath; (Slovakia) Karin Freyová; (Poland) Gabriela Migała; (Norway) Matilde Garnes; (United Kingdom) Lucy Campbell; Men: (Serbia) Lazar Đukić; (Iceland) Björgvin Karl Guðmundsson; (Latvia) Uldis Upenieks; (Germany) Moritz Fiebig; (Italy) Enrico Zenoni | Women: (United States) Haley Adams; (United States) Alexis Raptis; (United States) Paige Semenza; (United States) Kristi Eramo O'Connell; (United States) Christine Kolenbrander; Men: (United States) Justin Medeiros; (United States) Jayson Hopper; (United States) Cole Greashaber; (United States) Tudor Magda; (United States) Will Moorad | Women: (United States) Danielle Brandon; (Canada) Sydney Michalyshen; (United States) Baylee Rayl; (United States) Brooke Wells; (United States) Rebecca Fuselier; Men: (United States) Saxon Panchik; (United States) Dallin Pepper; (United States) Cole Sager; (United States) Noah Ohlsen; (United States) Spencer Panchik | Women: (South Africa) Michelle Merand; Men: (South Africa) Kealan Henry |

| Far East Throwdown (June 2–5) Busan, South Korea | Granite Games (June 2–5) Minnesota, United States | CrossFit Copa Sur (June 10–12) Espírito Santo, Brazil | Strength in Depth (June 10–12) England, United Kingdom | Atlas Games (June 10–12) Quebec, Canada |
|---|---|---|---|---|
| Women: (South Korea) Seungyeon Choi; (Turkey) Seher Kaya; Men: (Authorised Neutral Athletes) Roman Khrennikov^{C}; (Kuwait) ~~Nasser Alruwayeh~~^{A}; (Authorised Neutral Athletes) Arthur Semanov^{B} ^{C} | Women: (United States) Mallory O'Brien; (United States) Amanda Barnhart; (United States) Dani Speegle; (United States) Alex Gazan; (Canada) Emily Rolfe; Men: (Canada) Brent Fikowski; (United States) ~~Phil Toon~~^{A}; (United States) Travis Mayer; (United States) Samuel Kwant; (United States) Colten Mertens; (United States) Nick Mathew^{B} | Women: (Brazil) Victoria Campos; (Brazil) Julia Kato; Men: (Brazil) Guilherme Malheiros; (Brazil) ~~Pedro Martins~~^{A}; (Argentina) Agustin Richelme^{B} | Women: (Norway) Jacqueline Dahlstrøm; (Republic of Ireland) Emma McQuaid; (Iceland) Þuríður Erla Helgadóttir; (Iceland) Sólveig Sigurðardóttir; (Italy) Elisa Fuliano; Men: (France) Willy Georges; (Finland) Henrik Haapalainen; (Denmark) André Houdet; (Greece) Giorgos Karavis; (France) Guillaume Briant | Women: (Canada) Emma Lawson; (United States) Paige Powers; (United States) Caroline Conners; (Canada) Freya Moosbrugger; (Canada) Carolyne Prevost; Men: (Canada) Jeffrey Adler; (Canada) Patrick Vellner; (Canada) Alexandre Caron; (Canada) Alex Vigneault; (Canada) ~~Nycolas Joyal~~^{A}; (United States) Austin Spenser^{B} |

- ^{^A}Athlete tested positive for banned substances
- ^{^B}Backfilled athletes
- ^{^C}On March 1, 2022, CrossFit announced they will not recognise athletes from Russia or Belarus as a result of Russian violations of the Olympic truce through invasion of Ukraine during the binding truce. Athletes thereby will compete as neutral athletes.

| Last chance qualifier | Women | (United States) Arielle Loewen; (Spain) Elena Carratala Sanahuja | Men | (United States) Timothy Paulson; (Finland) Jonne Koski |

Representation by Nation
- United States (32)
- Canada (10)
- Australia (6)
- Brazil (3)
- Iceland (3)
- ANA (2)
- Finland (2)
- France (2)
- Italy (2)
- Norway (2)
- South Africa (2)
- Argentina (1)
- Denmark (1)
- Germany (1)
- Greece (1)
- Hungary (1)
- Ireland (1)
- Latvia (1)
- Poland (1)
- Serbia (1)
- Slovakia (1)
- South Korea (1)
- Spain (1)
- Turkey (1)
- United Kingdom (1)

== Individual competitions ==
Events in the CrossFit Games are scheduled to be held in Madison, Wisconsin, from August 3 to August 7, 2022.

=== August 3, 2022 ===
==== Event 1: Bike to Work ====
- 75 toes-to-bars
- 5-mile bike
- 75 chest-to-bar pull-ups
- 5-mile bike

Ricky Garard and Haley Adams were the respective winners of the first event.

==== Event 3: Skill Speed Medley ====
The field is reduced in 3 rounds, top 20 progress to second round, top 5 to the final round:

First round

- 3 M/2 F pegboard ascents
- 75 unbroken single-unders
- 10 unbroken single-leg squats on left leg, 10 unbroken single-leg squats on right
- Handstand walk course

Second round

- 2 M/1 F strict pegboard ascents
- 50 unbroken double-unders
- 10 unbroken single-leg squats on left leg, 10 unbroken single-leg squats on right
- Handstand walk course, pirouette start

Final round

- 1 strict pegboard ascent
- 25 double-under crossovers
- 10 unbroken single-leg squats on left leg, 10 unbroken single-leg squats on right
- Handstand walk course, low start

Most of the athletes had difficulties with a new element introduced this year: double-under crossovers. Nick Mathew, the male winner of the event, was one of only two men to complete the event. Danielle Brandon was the female winner, although none of the women could get to the single-leg squat and handstand walk course. Emma Lawson became the youngest-ever person to wear the white jersey after this event.

==== Event 4: Elizabeth Elevated ====
21-15-9-9-9 reps for time of:

- Squat cleans (woman 95 lb, men 135 lb)
- Dips with parallel bar traverses

The dips with parallel bar traverses is another new element introduced this year. Patrick Vellner won the event in the men's competition, while Arielle Loewen won the women's.

=== August 4, 2022 ===
==== Event 2A and 2B: Shuttle to Overhead ====
Event 2 was delayed to the second day which is normally a rest day due to weather conditions. The event is split into two for scoring purposes, 2A for the run, 2B for the max jerks.

- In 2 minutes, Run 400 m, Max jerks (Women: 200 lb, Men: 300 lb)

Rest 1 minute

- In 3 minutes, Run 600 m, Max jerks (Women: 200 lb, Men: 300 lb)

Rest 2 minutes

- In 4 minutes. Run 800 m, Max jerks (Women: 200 lb, Men: 300 lb)

Haley Adams and Uldis Upenieks were the respective female and male winner of the run portion, Tia-Clair Toomey and Jeffry Adler won the max jerks.

=== August 5, 2022 ===
==== Event 5: The Capitol ====
- 20 Pig flips (Women: 350 lb, Men: 510 lb)
- 3.5-mile run
- 200-m Jerry bag carry (Women: 70 lb, Men: 100 lb)
- 200-m Husafell carry (Women: 150 lb, Men: 200 lb)

Athletes started at the North Park of Alliant Energy Center, and finished at the top of the steps of Wisconsin State Capitol. Gabriela Migala and Ricky Garard won the women's and men's race respectively.

==== Event 6: Up and Over ====
3 rounds for time:

- 12 muscle-ups
- 25 jump-overs (Women: 50-in log, 30-in box, 20-in Pig, Men: 50-in log, 42-in box, 20-in Pig)
- 30 GHD sit-ups

Then

- 84-ft weighted lunge (Women: 125-lb axle bar, Men:185-lb axle bar)

Unusually, Tia-Clair Toomey wore the white jersey at the 2022 CrossFit Games the first time only at Event 6 with two points in front. She won to extend her lead slightly over second-place Mal O'Brien. Saxon Panchik won the men's event.

==== Event 7: Echo Press ====
For time:

- 30/25 Echo Bike calories
- 10 block HSPU (Women: 2-in deficit, Men: 3.5-in deficit)
- 20/15 Echo Bike calories
- 10 block HSPU (Women: 2-in deficit, Men: 3.5-in deficit)
- 20/15 Echo Bike calories
- 10 block HSPU (Women: 2-in deficit, Men: 3.5-in deficit)
- 30/25 Echo Bike calories

Will Moorad and Alexis Raptis won the men's and women's event respectively. Ricky Garard faltered in this event, reducing his lead significantly, while Toomey extended her lead over young challengers O'Brien and Emma Lawson.

=== August 6, 2022 ===
==== Event 8: Rinse 'N' Repeat ====
The swim event took place at an indoor pool this year. (Venue: Nicholas Recreation Center & Soderholm Family Aquatic Center, University of Wisconsin-Madison)

Every 2 minutes:

- 50-yard swim
- 8-cal Ski Erg (Add 2 calories each round for 6 rounds, then complete as many calories as possible for rounds 7 and 8)

The event was won by Lucy Campbell in the women's competition and Roman Khrennikov in the men's.

==== Event 9: Hat Trick ====
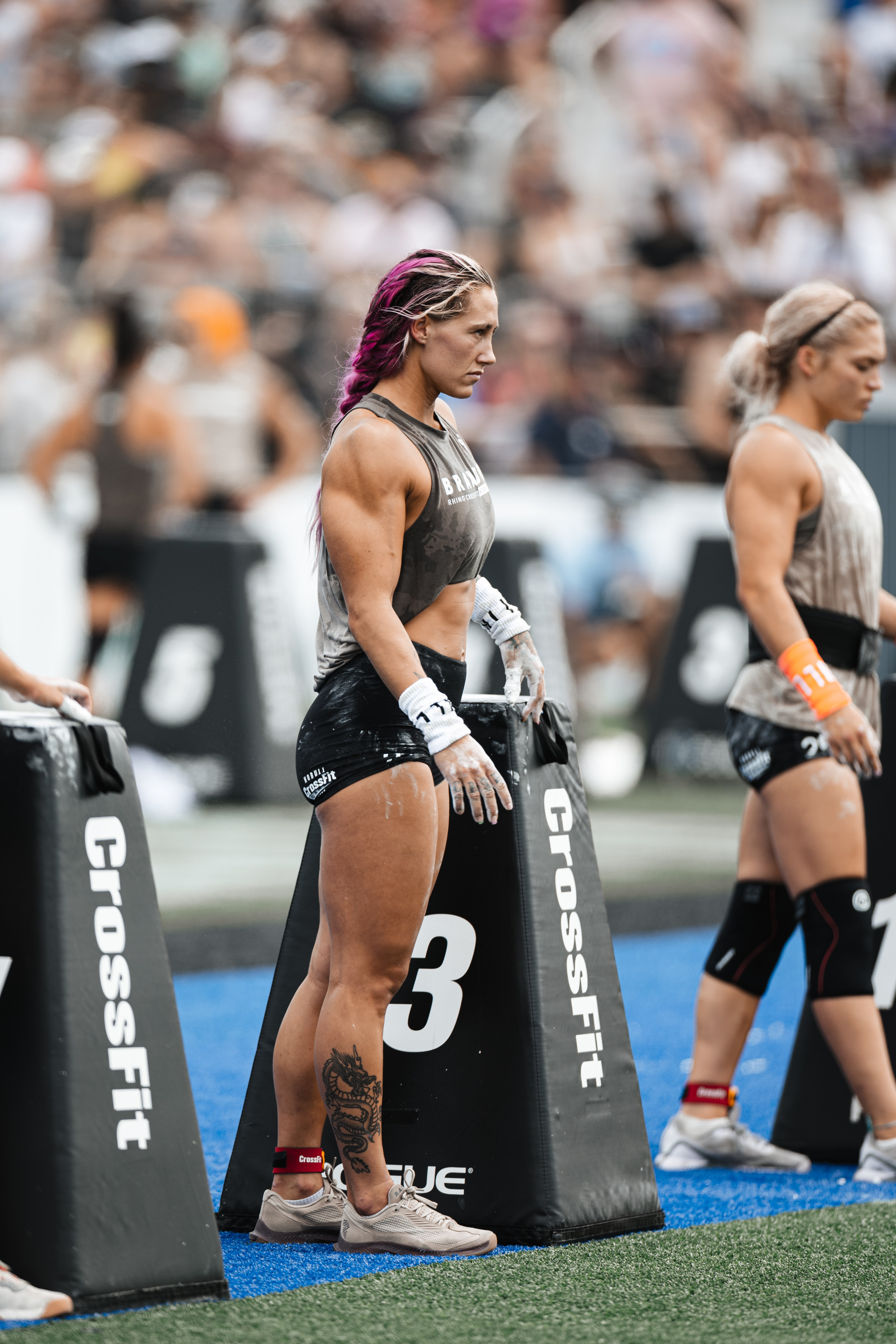
Athletes ready to start the event

3 rounds for total time of:

- Sprint
- 20 wall-ball shots (Women 14-lb ball to 11 ft, Men: 20-lb ball to 12 ft)
- 6 dumbbell snatches (Women: 70-lb DB, Men: 100-lb DB)

Rest 4 minutes between rounds

Ellie Turner and Guilherme Malheiros won the event. Justin Medeiros came third (after time adjustment) and after this event, took over the lead from Ricky Garard who had led since the beginning.

==== Event 10: Sandbag Ladder ====
- 1-rep-max sandbag-to-shoulder (Women: 160-250 lb, Men: 240-340 lb)

Athletes needed to lift the sandbag onto one shoulder and let go of one hand to show control. When multiple athletes failed to lift at the same weight, the tie-break was to throw 3 sandbags (Women: 50, 100, 150 lbs, Men: 100, 150, 200 lbs) over a yoke in the shortest time.

Dani Speegle won the event for the women, while there was a tie for first place between Malheiros and Nick Matthew for the men./

=== August 7, 2022 ===
==== Event 11: The Alpaca ====
for time:

- 126-ft sled push, decreasing in load
- ~~2 legless rope climbs~~*
- 20 kettlebell clean and jerks
- 42-ft sled push with 2 KBs
- ~~2 legless rope climbs~~*
- 15 kettlebell clean and jerks

42-ft sled push with 4 KBs

- ~~2 legless rope climbs~~*
- 10 kettlebell clean and jerks
- 42-ft sled push with 6 KBs

Women: Six 24-kg kettlebells Men: Six 32-kg kettlebells

The rope climb was removed due to weather conditions. Roman Khrennikov won his second event at the Games, while Laura Horvath won her first of this Games.

==== Event 12: Back Nine ====
For time:

54-ft yoke carry (Women: 485-lb, Men: 665-lb) 2 front squats (Women: 215-lb, Men: 315-lb) 3 deadlifts (Women: 315-lb, Men: 475-lb) 2 front squats 54-ft yoke carry

This event featured the heaviest yoke and deadlift ever programmed at the Games. Laura Horvath continued with her surge up the ranking with another win, while Jeffrey Adler won in the men's competition.

==== Event 13: Jackie Pro ====
For time:

- 1,000-m row (must be completed in 3 minutes 15 seconds for men, 3 minutes 40 seconds for women)
- 50 thrusters (Women: 65 lb, Men: 95 lb)
- 30 bar muscle-ups

Lucy Campbell and Lazar Đukić were the respective female and male winners of the event.

Justin Medeiros was crowned the male winner of the 2022 CrossFit Games. Medeiros did not win any event but won the competition through consistence performance; this is the first time since 2007 when the male winner of the Games did not win an event. Tia-Clair Toomey was the female winner for the sixth time, making her the only athlete, male or female, to win 6 individual titles. CrossFit Mayhem Freedom won the teams competition.

For the first time at the Games, two athletes, one male and one female, were named Rookies of the Year. They were Nick Mathew and Emma Lawson.

The list of national champions based how far they progress the furthest in the CrossFit Games season were released after the Games in December.

== Team competition ==
The team competition took place over 5 days:

=== August 3, 2022 ===
- Event 1: Biker Bob
- Event 2: Strong

=== August 4, 2022 ===
- Event 3: Fast
- Event 4: Pegs & P-Bar

=== August 5, 2022 ===
- Event 5: Muscle Pig
- Event 6: Handstand Machine

=== August 6, 2022 ===
- Event 7: Rinse 'N' Repeat
- Event 8: Dumbbell Highball
- Event 9: Payload

=== August 7, 2022 ===
- Event 10: Team 2-2-2-2
- Event 11: Echo Worm

== Podium finishers ==
=== Individuals and teams ===
| Place | Men | Women | Team |
|---|---|---|---|
| 1st | (United States) Justin Medeiros | (Australia) Tia-Clair Toomey | CrossFit Mayhem Freedom |
| 2nd | (Authorised Neutral Athletes) Roman Khrennikov | (United States) Mal O'Brien | CrossFit Oslo Navy Blue |
| 3rd | (Australia) Ricky Garard | (Hungary) Laura Horvath | CrossFit Invictus |

=== Masters men ===
| Place | 35–39 | 40–44 | 45–49 | 50–54 | 55–59 | 60–64 | 65+ |
|---|---|---|---|---|---|---|---|
| 1st | (United States) Bryan Wong | (United States) Rudolph Berger | (United States) Jason Grubb | (United States) Sean Patrick | (United States) Mike Egan | (United States) Shannon Aiken | (United States) Cal Cherrington |
| 2nd | (United States) Rogelio Gamboa | (Australia) Caine Hayes | (United States) Mike Kern | (United States) Richard Stevenson | (Brazil) Leonardo Wernersbach Lima | (United States) Tony Turski | (United States) John Mariotti |
| 3rd | (United States) Craig Kenney | (France) Alexandre Jolivet | (Authorised Neutral Athletes) Vlad Liashkevich | (United States) Eric C. Smith | (Italy) Antonio Boldrini | (United States) Tom Fameree | (United States) Jim Peeper |

=== Masters women ===
| Place | 35–39 | 40–44 | 45–49 | 50–54 | 55–59 | 60–64 | 65+ |
|---|---|---|---|---|---|---|---|
| 1st | (Finland) Emilia Leppänen | (United Kingdom) Kelly Friel | (United Kingdom) Ali Crawford | (Canada) Kim Purdy | (United States) Shanna Bunce | (United States) Mary Beth Prodromides | (United States) Julie Holt |
| 2nd | (Czech Republic) Aneta Tucker | (United States) Jenn Ryan | (Finland) Merituuli Kallio | (United States) Tea Gebbie | (United Kingdom) Leigh Coates | (Canada) Patricia McGill | (United States) Marcia Yager |
| 3rd | (United States) Chyna Cho | (United States) Rebecca Voight Miller | (United States) Michelle Suozzi | (United States) Marcie Wells | (United States) Kim Stambaugh | (New Zealand) Debbie Downing | (Sweden) Pia Gund |

=== Teens ===
| Place | 14–15 Boys | 14–15 Girls | 16–17 Boys | 16–17 Girls |
|---|---|---|---|---|
| 1st | (United States) RJ Mestre | (Republic of Ireland) Lucy McGonigle | (United States) Ty Jenkins | (United States) Olivia Kerstetter |
| 2nd | (Israel) Tal Simson | (United States) Rylee Beebe | (United States) Caleb McClure | (United States) Jadiza Onorati-Phillips |
| 3rd | (Jordan) Yousef Diab | (United States) Caroline Sabatini | (United States) Elijah Subiono | (United States) Sophia Shaft |

=== Adaptive divisions ===
| Place | Men Upper Extremity | Women Upper Extremity | Men Lower Extremity | Women Lower Extremity | Men Neuromuscular | Women Neuromuscular |
|---|---|---|---|---|---|---|
| 1st | (United States) Casey Acree | (Canada) Camille Vigneault | (United States) Charles Pienaar | (United States) Valerie Cohen | (United States) Brett Horchar | (United States) Morgan Johnson |
| 2nd | (United States) Josue Maldonado | (United States) Christina Mazzullo | (New Zealand) Rogan Dean | (United States) Molly Moore | (United States) Benjamin Fallon | (United States) Lauren Taylor |
| 3rd | (United States) Samuel Pera | (France) Anne-Laure Coutenceau | (Norway) Ole Kristian Antonsen | (United States) Amy Bream | (France) Jeremie Perera | (South Africa) Letchen Du Plessis |
