= CrossFit Mayhem =

American CrossFit affiliate

Coordinates: 36.1452°N 85.4790°W

- Founded: 2009
- Founder: Rich Froning Jr.
- Services: Fitness classes
- Website: mayhemnation.com

CrossFit Mayhem is a CrossFit affiliate located in Cookeville, Tennessee. Mayhem was started in 2009 by Rich Froning Jr. in his father's barn as a place to train. In 2012, Rich opened the original downtown facility, but almost immediately began plans to expand. That relocation/expansion occurred in 2016. Due in large part to Froning's success at the CrossFit Games, Crossfit Mayhem has become something of a pilgrimage site for many Crossfit Athletes and fans.

CrossFit Mayhem has fielded one or more teams at the CrossFit Games since 2013, and the team led by Rich Froning has won all the team competitions at the Games from 2015 to 2022 apart from 2017 when they came second, and 2020 when no team competition was held.

== CrossFit Games ==
While the Affiliate Cup first appeared in 2009, CrossFit Mayhem first fielded a competitive team only in 2013 when it finished 27th.

In 2015, upon retiring from individual competition, Rich Froning joined the CrossFit Mayhem team and the team has not finished lower than 2nd place at the CrossFit Games since, despite significant turnover of athletes. The 2015 team was titled CrossFit Mayhem Freedom. The team achieved back-to-back wins in 2015 and 2016.

In 2017, the team competed as CrossFit Mayhem. However, this year the team finished 48 points behind Wasatch CrossFit in second place.

2018 was the first time that CrossFit Mayhem competed two teams at the CrossFit Games. Mayhem Freedom took home the Championship after a year out of the top spot, while Mayhem Independence narrowly missed a podium spot, finishing 4th overall.

In 2019, the Affiliate Cup was put on pause, as Teams no longer had to belong to the same CrossFit Affiliate in order to compete together. This ushered in the brief era of the "Super Teams," though it did little to affect Mayhem's success in CrossFit Competition. Mayhem Freedom repeated as the 2019 CrossFit Games Champions.

Also in 2019, Elly Kabboord tested positive for the performance-enhancing substance clenbuterol, receiving a four-year ban from the sport and forcing Mayhem to re-shuffle their roster, adding Carolyne Prevost to the Independence team in time for the French Throwdown. Due in part to these changes, Independence failed to qualify.

Due to the COVID-19 pandemic, CrossFit was forced to make significant changes to the 2020 CrossFit Games, one of which was the elimination of team competition. Froning attempted to organize a replacement team competition titled Mayhem Madness, but that too had to be cancelled due to travel restriction.

In 2021, CrossFit returned to the Affiliate Cup model, resulting in the ineligibility of Scott Panchik and Chyna Cho. Andrea Nisler and Taylor Williamson, formerly of Mayhem competitor OC3 Black, both joined the team, along with Rich's cousin Chase Hill. CrossFit Mayhem was crowned the 2021 CrossFit Games Affiliate Cup Champion for the 5th time.

In 2022, CrossFit Mayhem has three teams qualified for the CrossFit Games, the first time three teams from the same gym location qualified for the Games (previously Invictus sent three teams but from different locations). Samuel Cournoyer joined the Froning-led CrossFit Mayhem Freedom team, which won the teams competition at the Games. Froning announced his retirement from team competition in October 2022 after winning their sixth title.

=== CrossFit Games results table ===
Year	Team	Games	Regional		Open
2013	CrossFit Mayhem	27th	1st (Central East)		18th (Worldwide)
2014	CrossFit Mayhem	DNQ	7th (Central East)		112th (Worldwide)
2015	CrossFit Mayhem Freedom	1st	1st (Central)		4th (Worldwide)
2015	CrossFit Mayhem Liberty				317th (Worldwide)
2016	CrossFit Mayhem Freedom	1st	1st (Central)		3rd (Worldwide)
2017	CrossFit Mayhem	2nd	1st (Central)		1st (Worldwide)
2018	CrossFit Mayhem Freedom	1st	1st (Central)		2nd (Worldwide)
2018	CrossFit Mayhem Independence	4th	4th (Central)		12th (Worldwide)
Year	Team	Games	Sanctional		Open
2019	CrossFit Mayhem Freedom	1st	5th (Wodapalooza CrossFit Festival); 3rd (Rogue Invitational); 1st (Asia CrossFit Championship)		2nd (Affiliate)
2019	CrossFit Mayhem Independence	DNQ	8th (Wodaplaooza CrossFit Festival); 6th (Rogue Invitational); 4th (DQ) (Reykjavik CrossFit Championship); WD (CrossFit Lowlands Throwdown); 3rd (CrossFit French Throwdown)		2nd (Affiliate)
2020	CrossFit Mayhem Freedom	No Team Competition	1st (CrossFit Strength in Depth); 1st (Wodapalooza CrossFit Festival)		1st (Affiliate)
2020	CrossFit Mayhem Independence	No Team Competition	4th (Wodapalooza CrossFit Festival); 1st (Australian CrossFit Championship)		1st (Affiliate)
Year	Team	Games	Semifinal	Quarterfinal	Open
2021	CrossFit Mayhem	1st	1st (Mid-Atlantic CrossFit Challenge)	1st (North America)	1st (North America)
2022	CrossFit Mayhem Freedom	1st	1st (Syndicate Crown)	1st (North America)	2nd (North America)
2022	CrossFit Mayhem Independence	5th	1st (MACC)	3rd (North America)	7th (North America)
2022	CrossFit Mayhem Justice	26th	5th (Syndicate Crown)	7th (North America)	91st (North America)
2023	CrossFit Mayhem Independence	7th	4th (North America East Semifinal)	2nd (North America East)	2nd (North America East)

=== CrossFit Games Team Roster ===
Year	Team	Male 1	Male 2	Male 3	Female 1	Female 2	Female 3
2013	CF Mayhem	Darren Hunsucker	Thomas Cox	Ben Rogers	Jackie Cox	Jen Hoffman	Lauren Neal
2014	CF Mayhem	Jake Lockert	Thomas Cox	Ben Rogers	Jackie Cox	Khristin Allen	Rachel Yepez
2015	CF Mayhem Freedom	Rich Froning	Matt Hewett	James Hobart	Lauren Neal	Kristin Reffert	Elly Kabboord
2016	CF Mayhem Freedom	Rich Froning	Matt Hewett	James Hobart	Lindy Barber	Kristin Reffert	Elly Kabboord
2017	CF Mayhem	Rich Froning	Matt Hewett	Darren Hunsucker	Lindy Barber	Kristin Reffert	Elly Kabboord
Year	Team	Male 1	Male 2	—	Female 1	Female 2	—
2018	CF Mayhem Freedom	Rich Froning	Matt Hewett	—	Lindy Barber	Tascia Persevecz	—
2018	CF Mayhem Independence	Ted Starkweather	Darren Hunsucker	—	Elly Kabboord	Kristen Long	—
2019	CF Mayhem Freedom	Rich Froning	Dre Strohm	—	Tascia Persevecz	Chyna Cho	—
2019	CF Mayhem Independence	Royce Dunne	Chase Hill	—	Kristen Miller	Carolyn Prevost	—
2020	CF Mayhem Freedom	Rich Froning	Scott Panchik	—	Tascia Persevecz	Chyna Cho	—
2020	CF Mayhem Independence	Royce Dunne	Chase Hill	—	Kristin Miller	Taylor Streid	—
2021	CF Mayhem Freedom	Rich Froning	Chase Hill	—	Andrea Nisler	Taylor Williamson	—
2022	CF Mayhem Freedom	Rich Froning	Samuel Cournoyer	—	Andrea Nisler	Taylor Williamson	—
2022	CF Mayhem Independence	Angelo DiCicco	Luke Parker	—	Alexis Johnson	Sasha Nievas	—
2022	CF Mayhem Justice	Ben Davidson	Seth Stovall	—	Jessica Kalagian	Anniston Sudhof	—
2023	CF Mayhem Independence	Angelo DiCicco	Sam DeMeester	—	Zoe Jones	Kyra Mulligan	—

== Significant current and former Mayhem athletes ==
- Rich Froning, Jr
- Mat Fraser
- Tia-Clair Toomey
- Scott Panchik
- Dan Bailey
- Chyna Cho
- Sara Sigmundsdottir
- Josh Bridges
- Haley Adams
