= Jayson Hopper =

American CrossFit athlete (born 1997)

Personal information
- Born: September 3, 1997 (age 29) Lexington, South Carolina, U.S.
- Occupation: CrossFit Athlete
- Height: 6 ft 1 in (185 cm)
- Weight: 230 lb (104 kg)

Sport
- Sport: CrossFit
- Coached by: Elcanah Senouvor
Medal record
Representing United States
CrossFit Games
Gold medal – first place	2025	Men
Rogue Invitational
Bronze medal – third place	2024	Men

Jayson Hopper is an American CrossFit athlete. He is the winner of the 2025 CrossFit Games.

== Early life ==
Jayson Hopper was born on September 3, 1997, in Lexington, South Carolina. He was a student at Lexington High School. He played baseball, but quit baseball to focus football at Lexington High School. Despite offers to four other places including Appalachian State Mountaineers, he decided to join Clemson as a preferred walk-on. He had to take a year off to achieve the grades required to get into Clemson University, and to keep himself fit he started training in CrossFit in 2017. He played as a wide receiver for Clemson. However, he left in 2018 with the intention of training to be a pastor and focus on CrossFit.

== Career ==
Hopper first took part in the CrossFit Open in 2017, but came to the attention of the public in 2021 when he reached the semifinal at Mid-Atlantic CrossFit Challenge held in Knoxville, Tennessee and won the men's division. He made his debut at the 2021 CrossFit Games, and finished 19th. Hopper also qualified for the Rogue Invitational in 2021, finishing in seventh place in this and two subsequent competitions.

After the 2021 Games, Hopper joined HWPO to train under Mat Fraser. At the 2022 CrossFit Games, Hopper improved on his 2021 result and finished 7th.

At the 2023 CrossFit Games, Hopper performed poorly in some of the events and was cut early, finishing in 31st place. Convinced that it was his weight, he dropped his weight down to 210 lbs.

In the 2024 CrossFit Games, Hopper's performance improved and he finished just outside the podium in 4th place. At the 2024 Rogue Invitational, he finished 3rd. In late 2024, Hopper moved from HWPO to Brute.

At the 2025 CrossFit Games, the competition was closely contested by a number of athletes, with the lead changing a few times in the early events. Hopper took the lead after event 5, maintained the lead, and won the competition just 14 points ahead of Ricky Garard.

== Personal life ==
Hopper married Grace Anne in February 2020.

== CrossFit Games results ==
Year	Games	Semifinal	Quarterfinal	Open
2017				15,007th (Worldwide)
2018				7,413th (Worldwide)
2019				451st (Worldwide)
2020				171st (Worldwide)
2021	19th	1st (MACC)	52nd (worldwide); 35th (North America)	19th (Worldwide); 12th (North America)
2022	7th	2nd (Syndicate Crown)	33rd (Worldwide); 19th (North America East)	16th (Worldwide); 13th (North America)
2023	31st	2nd (North America East)	22nd (Worldwide); 10th (North America East)	35th (Worldwide); 17th (North America East)
2024	4th	4th (North America East)	11th (Worldwide) 4th (North America East)	49th (Worldwide) 15th (North America East)
2025	1st	4th (Individual semifinal)	—N/a	6th (Worldwide) 5th (North America West)
2026	6th	1st (French Throwdown)	19th (Worldwide); 10th (North America East)	26th (Worldwide) 5th (North America West)
