= Jeffrey Adler =

Canadian CrossFit athlete

Personal information
- Citizenship: Canadian
- Born: May 20, 1994 (age 32)
- Occupation: Professional CrossFit athlete
- Years active: 2016–present
- Height: 1.75 m (5 ft 9 in)
- Weight: 89 kg (196 lb)

Sport
- Sport: CrossFit
- Coached by: Caroline Lambray
Medal record
Representing Canada
CrossFit Games
| Gold medal – first place | 2023 | Men |
Rogue Invitational
| Gold medal – first place | 2025 | Men |
| Gold medal – first place | 2024 | Men |
| Silver medal – second place | 2023 | Men |
| Bronze medal – third place | 2022 | Men |
| Bronze medal – third place | 2021 | Men |

Jeffrey Adler is a Canadian CrossFit athlete. In 2023, he won the title of "Fittest on Earth" at the 2023 CrossFit Games.

== CrossFit career ==
Adler began to train at CrossFit in 2015, and had no previous training in competitive sports. His first world championship bid came at the 2019 CrossFit Games. He was a finalist at the 2020 CrossFit Games, where he placed fifth. He was placed third at the Rogue Invitational in 2021, and again in 2022. At the 2022 CrossFit Games, he was placed fifth.

In 2023 he was the grand champion of the competition, being named the "Fittest Man on Earth", becoming the first non-American male to win the competition since 2009. That year he also placed first at the CrossFit Open.

In 2024, Adler withdrew from the 2024 CrossFit Games following Lazar Dukic's death during Event 1. Later in the year, Adler won the 2024 Rogue Invitational for the first time.

In 2025, Adler finished 8th at the CrossFit Games. Soon after, he withdrew from the WFP Tour, citing having to manage a recurring injury as the reason. Later in the year, Adler became the repeat champion at Rogue Invitational when he won for the second time.

== Personal life ==
Adler is engaged to his training partner and coach Caroline Lambray, with whom he co-founded an affiliated CrossFit gym, CrossFit Wonderland, in Montreal.

== CrossFit Games results ==
| Year | Games | Regional | | Open |
|---|---|---|---|---|
| 2016 | — | — | | 2709th (World) |
| 2017 | — | — | | 410th (World) |
| 2018 | — | 18th (East) | | 98th (World) |
| Year | Games | Sanctional | | Open |
| 2019 | 33rd | 13th (Dubai); 19th (Wodapalooza) | | 26th (World) |
| 2020 | 5th | 8th (Dubai); 3rd (Mayhem) | | 5th (World) |
| Year | Games | Semifinal | Quarterfinal | Open |
| 2021 | 13th | 2nd (Atlas Games) | 3rd (World) | 1st (World) |
| 2022 | 5th | 1st (Atlas Games) | 3rd (World) | 12th (World) |
| 2023 | 1st | 1st (North America East) | 5th (World) | 1st (World) |
| 2024 | 36th (WD) | 1st (North America East) | 2nd (World) | 8th (World) |
| 2025 | 8th | 1st (Individual semifinal) | | 3rd (World) |
| 2026 | 7th | 3rd (Mayhem Classic) | 2nd (World) | 3rd (World) |
"—" denotes competitions Adler did not participate in
