= 2025 CrossFit Games =

Athletic competition

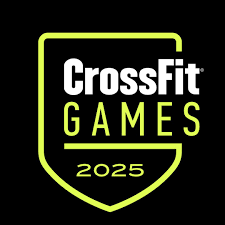
- Venue: MVP Arena
- Location: Albany, New York
- Dates: August 1–August 3, 2025

Champions
- Men: (United States) Jayson Hopper
- Women: (Australia) Tia-Clair Toomey
- Team: (Norway) CrossFit Oslo Kriger

The 2025 CrossFit Games were the 19th edition of the competition in the sport of CrossFit and were held from August 1 to August 3, 2025, in Albany, New York. Jayson Hopper was the male champion, Tia-Clair Toomey was the female champion for the 8th time, and CrossFit Oslo Kriger won the team competition.

The CrossFit Games were held at MVP Arena in Albany this year after only a year at the Dickies Arena in Fort Worth, Texas. A number of changes were made to the season, including the removal of the quarterfinals, and athletes move from the Open directly to the semifinals. Semifinalists then qualified for the Games either via virtual in-affiliate semifinals or in-person qualifying events. A new Community Cup was also introduced for those who did not qualify for the semifinals.

The Games were reduced in scale and scope this year. The competition was held over 3 days instead of 4, and the number of events for the individual competition was also reduced to 10. The number of individual qualifiers was reduced to 30, and the number of teams to 20. The prize purse this year came from 50% of the fees paid by Open entrants. As a result of fewer athletes registering for the Open this year, the prize purse was reduced to the lowest level since 2016.

== Qualifications ==
=== Open ===
The 2025 CrossFit Open started on February 27, 2025. A number of athletes and affiliates had indicated that they would not participate in this Games season, citing the death of a competitor at the 2024 Games and inadequate response from CrossFit leadership as some of the reasons. This year 233,815 people registered for the Open, which is the lowest since 2014, and a drop of 32% from 2024.

- 25.1 – 15-minute AMRAP: 3 Lateral Burpees Over the Dumbbell, 3 Dumbbell Hang Clean-to-Overheads, 30 ft Walking Lunge (2 x 15 ft) (After completing each round, add 3 reps to the burpees and hang clean-to-overheads).
- 25.2 – For time: 21 pull-ups, 42 double-unders, 21 thrusters (F 65-lb, M 95-lb), 18 chest-to-bar pull-ups, 36 double-unders, 18 thrusters (F 75-lb, M 115-lb), 15 bar muscle-ups, 30 double-unders, 15 thrusters (F 85-lb, M 135-lb) (12 minutes time cap)
- 25.3 – For time: 5 wall walks, 50-calorie row, 5 wall walks, 25 deadlifts, 5 wall walks, 25 cleans, 5 wall walks, 25 snatches, 5 wall walks, 50-calorie row (20 minutes time cap)

Colten Mertens and Mirjam von Rohr were the respective male and female winners of the Open.

The top 1% of participating athletes (or a minimum of 1,200 athletes) in the individual division can proceed directly to the semifinals since the quarterfinals have been eliminated this year. For the age groups, the top 2% or a minimum of 200 per division can move on to the in-affiliate semifinals.

A Community Cup was initiated this season as a replacement for the quarterfinals for those who did not qualify for the semifinals but wish to compete further. Any individual athlete who submitted three scores for the Open can take part in the Community Cup where athletes of similar abilities are grouped into levels to compete together.

=== Semifinals ===
There were two ways individual athletes can qualify for the Games – In-Affiliate Semifinals, which were held on May 1–4, and In-Person Qualifying Events, which were held from early April to early June. There were 10 In-Person Qualifying Events, with 18 qualifying places available.

== Qualifiers ==
This year the qualifiers for the individuals competitions have been reduced to 30 men and 30 women. For the teams the number has been reduced to 20.

=== Individuals ===
Qualifiers from the In-Affiliate Semifinals, 10 In-Person Qualifying Events, and Last Chance Qualifier:

Mayhem Classic (April 5–6) Tennessee, United States		Copa Sur (April 18–20) Rio de Janeiro, Brazil		Wodland Fest (April 25–27) Málaga, Spain	
Men	Women	Men	Women	Men	Women
(United States) Austin Hatfield (United States) Colten Mertens	(United States) Feeroozeh Saghafi (United States) Abigail Domit	(Brazil) Henrique Moreira (Brazil) Kalyan Souza	(Colombia) Maria Quintero (Brazil) Luiza Marques	(Russia) Roman Khrennikov (Germany) Moritz Fiebig	(United Kingdom) Lucy Campbell (South Korea) Seungyeon Choi

In-Affiliate Semifinals (May 1–4)
Men			Women		
(Canada) Jeff Adler (Australia) Jay Crouch (United States) Dallin Pepper (United States) James Sprague	(United States) Tudor Magda (United States) Jayson Hopper (Australia) Ricky Garard (United States) Justin Medeiros	(Italy) Enrico Zenoni (Switzerland) Colin Bosshard (United Kingdom) Harry Lightfoot	(Albania) Siria Meha (United States) Alexis Raptis (United States) Arielle Loewen (Canada) Anikha Greer	(Australia) Madeline Sturt (United States) Danielle Brandon (United States) Haley Adams (Australia) Grace Walton	(United Kingdom) Aimee Cringle (Switzerland) Mirjam Von Rohr (United Kingdom) Jennifer Muir

French Throwdown (May 9–11) Montpellier, France		TFX Invitational (May 16–18) Oklahoma, United States		Renegade Games (May 29 – June 1) Vanderbijlpark, South Africa	
Men	Women	Men	Women	Men	Women
(Poland) Bronisław Olenkowicz (Spain) Calum Clements	(France) Claudia Gluck (Republic of Ireland) Lucy McGonigle	(United States) Nick Mathew (United States) Chris Ibarra	(United States) Olivia Kerstetter (Canada) Sydney Michalyshen	(United Kingdom) Toby Buckland	(Zimbabwe) Christina Livaditakis

Far East Throwdown (May 30 – June 1) Busan, South Korea		Syndicate Crown (May 30 – June 1) Tennessee, United States		Torian Pro (May 30 – June 1) Brisbane, Australia	
Men	Women	Men	Women	Men	Women
~~(Iran) Morteza Sedaghat~~ (Note: Morteza Sedaghat was unable to attend due to visa issue.) (Portugal) Tiago Luzes (Note: Tiago Tuzes replaced Morteza Sedaghat.)	(Mexico) Mariana Meza	(United States) Ty Jenkins (United States) Jack Rozema	(United States) Brooke Wells (United States) Lexi Neely	(Australia) Peter Ellis (Australia) Isaac Newman	(Australia) Tia-Clair Toomey (Australia) Emily de Rooy

Northern California Classic (June 6–8) California, United States		The Hustle Up Last-Chance Qualifier (June 13–16)	
Men	Women	Men	Women
(United States) William Leahy IV (United States) Jorge Fernandez	~~(United States) Alex Gazan~~ (Note: Alex Gazan withdrew from competition due to injury.) (Canada) Hattie Kanyo (Canada) Carolyne Prevost (Note: Carolyne Prevost replaced Alex Gazan.)	(Finland) Jonne Koski	(United States) Lydia Fish

Representation by Nation
- United States (23)
- Australia (8)
- Canada (5)
- United Kingdom (5)
- Brazil (3)
- Switzerland (2)
- Albania (1)
- Colombia (1)
- Finland (1)
- France (1)
- Germany (1)
- Ireland (1)
- Italy (1)
- Mexico (1)
- Poland (1)
- Portugal (1)
- Russia (1)
- South Korea (1)
- Spain (1)
- Zimbabwe (1)

=== Teams ===
All teams competed in the in-affiliate Semifinals, with the top 20 teams qualifying for the Games.

In-Affiliate Semifinals (April 24–27)
(Norway) CrossFit Oslo Kriger (Denmark) CrossFit Butcher's Lab Vanløse (United States) CrossFit Undivided (Canada) CrossFit Le Repere Mayhem (Norway) CrossFit Furuset Kriger (United States) CrossFit 1124 (United States) CrossFit Body Blueprint Conquer (United States) CrossFit Greater Heights Overtake (United Kingdom) Blueprint CrossFit Team AOD (United States) CrossFit Mayhem	(United States) CrossFit Invictus (United States) CrossFit PRVN (Spain) CrossFit 4 Friends Smart (United States) CrossFit Franco's EMOM Co. (Sweden) CrossFit Prestanda (United States) Camp Rhino CrossFit Dawgs (United States) Camel City CrossFit (Argentina) Q21 CrossFit (United States) 8th Day CrossFit (United States) CrossFit Hendersonville Mayhem

Representation by Nation
- United States (12)
- Norway (2)
- Argentina (1)
- Canada (1)
- Denmark (1)
- Spain (1)
- Sweden (1)
- United Kingdom (1)

== Individual competitions ==
=== Event 1: Run/Row/Run ===
For time

- 4-mile run
- 3,000-meter row
- 2-mile run

#	Men	Time	Pts Total	Women	Time	Pts Total
1	(Canada) Jeffrey Adler	46:16	100	(Australia) Tia-Clair Toomey	49:49	100
2	(Authorised Neutral Athletes) Roman Khrennikov	46:26	96	(United Kingdom) Aimee Cringle	50:16	96
3	(Australia) Ricky Garard	46:45	92	(United Kingdom) Lucy Campbell	51:36	92
4	(United States) Austin Hatfield	47:41	88	(United States) Haley Adams	52:02	88
5	(Australia) Jay Crouch	47:50	84	(United States) Arielle Loewen	52:16	84
6	(Brazil) Kalyan Souza	48:01	80	(Switzerland) Mirjam Von Rohr	52:58	80
7	(United States) James Sprague	48:24	76	(Australia) Madeline Sturt	53:27	76
8	(United States) Jayson Hopper	48:54	72	(United States) Danielle Brandon	53:34	72
9	(United States) Chris Ibarra	49:06	68	(United States) Abigail Domit	53:35	68
10	(United Kingdom) Harry Lightfoot	49:36	64	(Australia) Grace Walton	53:35	64
11	(United States) Ty Jenkins	49:49	60	(United Kingdom) Jennifer Muir	53:48	60
12	(United States) Justin Medeiros	50:05	56	(United States) Lydia Fish	54:22	56
13	(Switzerland) Colin Bosshard	50:29	52	(Canada) Hattie Kanyo	55:10	52
14	(United States) Isaac Newman	50:42	48	(United States) Alexis Raptis	55:39	48
15	(United States) Dallin Pepper	51:15	45	(United States) Brooke Wells	55:59	45
16	(Portugal) Tiago Luzes	51:24	42	(South Korea) Seungyeon Choi	56:15	42
17	(Italy) Enrico Zenoni	51:29	39	(United States) Fee Saghafi	56:36	39
18	(United States) Nick Mathew	51:34	36	(Canada) Sydney Michalyshen	56:37	36
19	(United States) Jorge Fernandez	51:47	33	(Republic of Ireland) Lucy McGonigle	57:00	33
20	(United States) Tudor Magda	51:59	30	(Albania) Siria Meha	57:32	30
21	(Spain) Calum Clements	52:11	27	(Mexico) Mariana Meza	57:44	27
22	(United States) William Leahy IV	52:33	24	(Colombia) Maria Camila Qintero	57:46	24
23	(United Kingdom) Toby Buckland	52:46	21	(Canada) Carolyne Prevost	57:54	21
24	(United States) Jack Rozema	52:59	18	(Zimbabwe) Christina Livaditakis	57:59	18
25	(Germany) Moritz Fiebig	53:02	15	(France) Claudia Gluck	58:13	15
26	(United States) Colton Mertens	53:11	12	(Australia) Emily de Rooy	58:53	12
27	(Finland) Jonne Koski	53:25	9	(Canada) Anikha Greer	58:59	9
28	(Australia) Peter Ellis	54:12	6	(United States) Olivia Kerstetter	59:02	6
29	(Brazil) Henrique Moreira	56:38	3	(United States) Lexi Neely	59:48	3
30	(Poland) Bronislaw Olenkowicz	1:03:13	0	(Brazil) Luiza Marques	1:04:57	0

=== Event 2: All Crossed Up ===
For time:

- 20 wall walks
- 10 DB shoulder-to-overheads
- 20 double-under crossovers
- 30 toes-to-bars
- 20 double-under crossovers
- 10 DB shoulder-to-overheads
- 20 double-under crossovers
- 30 toes-to-bars
- 20 double-under crossovers
- 10 DB shoulder-to-overheads

Women: 70-lb dumbbell

Men: 100-lb dumbbell

#	Men	Time	Pts Total	Women	Time	Pts Total
1	(Australia) Ricky Garard	06:06.46	192	(Australia) Tia-Clair Toomey	06:23.98	200
2	(United States) Justin Medeiros	06:06.81	152	(United States) Danielle Brandon	06:28.63	168
3	(Australia) Jay Crouch	06:15.59	176	(United Kingdom) Aimee Cringle	06:38.19	188
4	(United States) Jayson Hopper	06:33.43	160	(Republic of Ireland) Lucy McGonigle	07:00.19	121
5	(United Kingdom) Harry Lightfoot	06:44.56	148	(United States) Lydia Fish	07:06.76	140
6	(United States) Dallin Pepper	06:45.85	125	(France) Claudia Gluck	07:06.90	95
7	(Switzerland) Colin Bosshard	06:45.95	128	(Canada) Anikha Greer	07:14.07	85
8	(United States) Tudor Magda	06:47.43	102	(Switzerland) Mirjam Von Rohr	07:19.56	152
9	(United States) Austin Hatfield	06:49.48	156	(Australia) Madeline Sturt	07:20.19	144
10	(Authorised Neutral Athletes) Roman Khrennikov	06:54.37	160	(United Kingdom) Lucy Campbell	07:22.74	156
11	(Canada) Jeffrey Adler	06:58.32	160	(United States) Olivia Kerstetter	07:30.68	66
12	(Poland) Bronislaw Olenkowicz	06:59.25	56	(United States) Arielle Loewen	07:31.14	140
13	(Spain) Calum Clements	07:07.06	79	(Australia) Grace Walton	07:50.60	116
14	(United States) James Sprague	07:11.79	124	(United States) Abigail Domit	07:56.27	116
15	(Italy) Enrico Zenoni	07:13.82	84	(Canada) Hattie Kanyo	07:57.76	97
16	(Brazil) Kalyan Souza	07:22.60	122	(United States) Lexi Neely	08:07.25	45
17	(United States) Chris Ibarra	07:22.80	107	(United States) Haley Adams	08:28.92	127
18	(United States) Nick Mathew	07:38.60	72	(United States) Fee Saghafi	08:30.62	75
19	(Finland) Jonne Koski	07:46.93	42	(United States) Brooke Wells	08:31.70	78
20	(United States) Colton Mertens	07:47.63	42	(Albania) Siria Meha	08:45.12	60
21	(United States) Jack Rozema	07:56.15	45	(Canada) Sydney Michalyshen	08:52.10	63
22	(United States) Isaac Newman	08:10.31	72	(Zimbabwe) Christina Livaditakis	09:01.29	42
23	(United States) Ty Jenkins	08:13.18	81	(United States) Alexis Raptis	09:09.22	69
24	(Australia) Peter Ellis	08:26.37	24	(Brazil) Luiza Marques	09:13.40	18
25	(Brazil) Henrique Moreira	08:29.11	18	(South Korea) Seungyeon Choi	09:29.93	57
26	(United States) William Leahy IV	08:34.39	36	(Canada) Carolyne Prevost	09:42.73	33
27	(United States) Jorge Fernandez	08:41.29	42	(Colombia) Maria Camila Qintero	CAP+7	33
28	(United Kingdom) Toby Buckland	08:59.37	27	(Mexico) Mariana Meza	CAP+10	33
29	(Portugal) Tiago Luzes	09:10.77	45	(United Kingdom) Jennifer Muir	CAP+10	63
30	(Germany) Moritz Fiebig	CAP+18	15	(Australia) Emily de Rooy	CAP+67	12

=== Event 3: Climbing Couplet ===
4-3-2-1 reps for time of:

- Pegboard
- Squat clean + front squat

Women: 145, 165, 185, 205 lb

Men: 235, 265, 285, 305 lb

#	Men	Time	Pts Total	Women	Time	Pts Total
1	(United States) Jayson Hopper	05:34.90	260	(United States) Fee Saghafi	08:33.24	175
2	(Authorised Neutral Athletes) Roman Khrennikov	05:38.67	256	(United States) Lydia Fish	09:30.58	236
3	(United Kingdom) Harry Lightfoot	05:41.48	240	(Albania) Siria Meha	09:41.98	152
4	(United States) Justin Medeiros	05:41.58	240	(United States) Olivia Kerstetter	09:55.15	154
5	(Australia) Jay Crouch	05:53.23	260	(United States) Lexi Neely	10:01.58	129
6	(Canada) Jeffrey Adler	05:57.38	240	(United Kingdom) Lucy Campbell	10:32.11	236
7	(United States) Jack Rozema	06:09.10	121	(Colombia) Maria Camila Qintero	10:32.63	109
8	(United States) James Sprague	06:11.92	196	(France) Claudia Gluck	10:37.31	167
9	(United States) Tudor Magda	06:38.05	170	(United States) Alexis Raptis	10:48.79	137
10	(United States) Colton Mertens	06:52.11	106	(Canada) Anikha Greer	10:52.26	149
11	(United States) Dallin Pepper	07:14.57	185	(Zimbabwe) Christina Livaditakis	10:59.68	102
12	(Spain) Calum Clements	07:17.75	135	(Australia) Emily de Rooy	11:02.83	68
13	(United States) Ty Jenkins	07:20.48	133	(Canada) Sydney Michalyshen	11:24.13	115
14	(Australia) Ricky Garard	07:20.67	240	(Australia) Madeline Sturt	11:25.78	192
15	(Italy) Enrico Zenoni	07:22.12	129	(United States) Arielle Loewen	11:41.85	185
16	(United States) Chris Ibarra	07:39.73	149	(Australia) Tia-Clair Toomey	12:05.52	242
17	(Australia) Peter Ellis	07:39.78	63	(Canada) Hattie Kanyo	12:16.41	136
18	(Finland) Jonne Koski	08:27.09	78	(United Kingdom) Jennifer Muir	12:41.73	99
19	(Brazil) Kalyan Souza	08:55.12	155	(South Korea) Seungyeon Choi	12:44.92	90
20	(United Kingdom) Toby Buckland	09:07.32	57	(Switzerland) Mirjam Von Rohr	CAP+1	182
21	(United States) Jorge Fernandez	09:14.28	69	(Canada) Carolyne Prevost	CAP+1	60
22	(United States) Nick Mathew	09:33.43	96	(United States) Brooke Wells	CAP+2	102
23	(United States) William Leahy IV	09:35.84	57	(United States) Abigail Domit	CAP+4	137
24	(Portugal) Tiago Luzes	09:37.27	63	(United States) Danielle Brandon	CAP+5	186
25	(United States) Isaac Newman	09:44.58	87	(United States) Haley Adams	CAP+5	142
26	(Germany) Moritz Fiebig	09:49.31	27	(Australia) Grace Walton	CAP+10	128
27	(Switzerland) Colin Bosshard	CAP+3	137	(Mexico) Mariana Meza	CAP+10	42
28	(United States) Austin Hatfield	CAP+6	162	(Republic of Ireland) Lucy McGonigle	CAP+10	127
29	(Brazil) Henrique Moreira	CAP+8	21	(United Kingdom) Aimee Cringle	CAP+11	191
30	(Poland) Bronislaw Olenkowicz	CAP+11	56	(Brazil) Luiza Marques	CAP+12	18

=== Event 4: Albany Grip Trip ===
5 rounds for time of:

- 300-meter run
- 12 deadlifts
- 100-foot handstand walk (150 ft for last round)

Women: 220-lb deadlift

Men: 350-lb deadlift

#	Men	Time	Pts Total	Women	Time	Pts Total
1	(Australia) Jay Crouch	16:28.57	360	(United Kingdom) Lucy Campbell	16:33.05	336
2	(Brazil) Kalyan Souza	16:32.62	251	(United States) Haley Adams	17:01.34	238
3	(United States) James Sprague	17:01.62	288	(Australia) Tia-Clair Toomey	17:37.63	334
4	(United States) Jayson Hopper	17:22.91	348	(United States) Olivia Kerstetter	17:49.24	242
5	(United States) Austin Hatfield	17:27.08	242	(Australia) Grace Walton	18:00.39	212
6	(United States) Dallin Pepper	17:41.29	265	(United States) Brooke Wells	18:26.02	182
7	(Canada) Jeffrey Adler	17:42.92	316	(United States) Arielle Loewen	18:27.51	261
8	(Australia) Ricky Garard	18:03.94	312	(United States) Danielle Brandon	18:27.85	258
9	(United States) Justin Medeiros	18:08.40	308	(United Kingdom) Aimee Cringle	18:28.81	259
10	(United States) Tudor Magda	18:11.84	234	(Australia) Madeline Sturt	18:35.93	256
11	(United States) Nick Mathew	18:18.86	156	(United States) Lydia Fish	18:57.91	296
12	(United Kingdom) Harry Lightfoot	18:23.90	296	(Australia) Emily de Rooy	19:24.35	124
13	(United States) Ty Jenkins	18:33.17	185	(Republic of Ireland) Lucy McGonigle	19:38.00	179
14	(Spain) Calum Clements	18:34.82	183	(United States) Alexis Raptis	19:41.44	185
15	(Authorised Neutral Athletes) Roman Khrennikov	18:42.22	301	(Switzerland) Mirjam Von Rohr	19:48.17	227
16	(United States) William Leahy IV	18:42.35	99	(United States) Abigail Domit	20:24.40	179
17	(United States) Chris Ibarra	18:45.76	188	(United States) Lexi Neely	20:24.51	168
18	(Italy) Enrico Zenoni	19:02.83	165	(United Kingdom) Jennifer Muir	20:30.15	135
19	(United States) Colton Mertens	19:12.13	139	(Canada) Carolyne Prevost	20:35.98	93
20	(United States) Jack Rozema	19:51.13)	151	(Canada) Anikha Greer	20:43.21	179
21	(Switzerland) Colin Bosshard	20:04.22	164	(France) Claudia Gluck	20:46.95	194
22	(Portugal) Tiago Luzes	20:25.98	87	(Canada) Hattie Kanyo	20:59.20	160
23	(United States) Jorge Fernandez	20:31.04	90	(Colombia) Maria Camila Qintero	21:12.87	130
24	(Germany) Moritz Fiebig	20:51.34	45	(Zimbabwe) Christina Livaditakis	21:17.81	120
25	(Poland) Bronislaw Olenkowicz	21:09.67	71	(Canada) Sydney Michalyshen	21:32.86	130
26	(United States) Isaac Newman	21:33.36	99	(South Korea) Seungyeon Choi	21:46.51	102
27	(Australia) Peter Ellis	21:48.13	72	(United States) Fee Saghafi	22:18.51	184
28	(Finland) Jonne Koski	CAP+2	84	(Mexico) Mariana Meza	22:36.36	48
29	(United Kingdom) Toby Buckland	CAP+2	60	(Albania) Siria Meha	23:09.86	155
30	(Brazil) Henrique Moreira	CAP+171	21	(Brazil) Luiza Marques	CAP+7	18

=== Event 5: 1RM Back Squat ===
- 1-rep-max back squat

#	Men	Weight (lb)	Pts Total	Women	Weight (lb)	Pts Total
1	(United States) Colton Mertens	570	239	(Switzerland) Mirjam Von Rohr	360	327
2	(United States) Nick Mathew	555	252	(Canada) Anikha Greer	355	275
3	(United States) Jack Rozema	515	243	(United Kingdom) Jennifer Muir	355	231
4	(United States) Austin Hatfield	515	338	(Australia) Tia-Clair Toomey	335	422
5	(United States) Justin Medeiros	505	392	(United States) Brooke Wells	330	266
6	(United States) Jayson Hopper	500	428	(United States) Olivia Kerstetter	325	322
7	(Poland) Bronislaw Olenkowicz	500	147	(Australia) Madeline Sturt	325	332
8	(United States) Dallin Pepper	495	337	(France) Claudia Gluck	325	266
9	(United States) Jorge Fernandez	490	158	(Canada) Sydney Michalyshen	320	198
10	(Authorised Neutral Athletes) Roman Khrennikov	485	365	(United States) Abigail Domit	320	243
11	(United States) William Leahy IV	485	159	(Australia) Grace Walton	315	272
12	(United Kingdom) Harry Lightfoot	485	352	(United States) Fee Saghafi	315	240
13	(United Kingdom) Toby Buckland	485	116	(Canada) Carolyne Prevost	315	145
14	(Australia) Jay Crouch	485	408	(South Korea) Seungyeon Choi	310	150
15	(Germany) Moritz Fiebig	485	93	(Mexico) Mariana Meza	305	93
16	(Brazil) Henrique Moreira	480	63	(United States) Lexi Neely	305	210
17	(Canada) Jeffrey Adler	470	355	(Albania) Siria Meha	300	194
18	(United States) James Sprague	465	324	(United Kingdom) Aimee Cringle	300	295
19	(United States) Ty Jenkins	460	218	(Canada) Hattie Kanyo	300	193
20	(United States) Isaac Newman	460	129	(Republic of Ireland) Lucy McGonigle	300	212
21	(United States) Tudor Magda	460	261	(Australia) Emily de Rooy	300	151
22	(Spain) Calum Clements	455	207	(Colombia) Maria Camila Qintero	295	154
23	(Australia) Ricky Garard	455	333	(United Kingdom) Lucy Campbell	295	357
24	(Australia) Peter Ellis	450	90	(Zimbabwe) Christina Livaditakis	295	138
25	(Finland) Jonne Koski	450	99	(United States) Arielle Loewen	290	276
26	(United States) Chris Ibarra	450	200	(Brazil) Luiza Marques	285	30
27	(Switzerland) Colin Bosshard	445	173	(United States) Lydia Fish	280	305
28	(Portugal) Tiago Luzes	440	93	(United States) Alexis Raptis	280	191
29	(Brazil) Kalyan Souza	415	254	(United States) Haley Adams	265	241
30	(Italy) Enrico Zenoni	415	165	(United States) Danielle Brandon	265	258

=== Event 6: Throttle Up ===
Event 6 and 7 was held back-to-back with a minute rest in between.

For time:

- 35-Calorie SkiErg
- 28 chest-to-bar pull-ups
- 24 burpee box jump-overs

Women: 16-lb vest, 20-inch box

Men: 22-lb vest, 24-inch box

Time cap: 6 minute

#	Men	Time	Pts Total	Women	Time	Pts Total
1	(United States) James Sprague	03:10.72	424	(United States) Arielle Loewen	03:52.00	376
2	(Australia) Ricky Garard	03:14.21	429	(Republic of Ireland) Lucy McGonigle	03:55.56	308
3	(Spain) Calum Clements	03:17.41	299	(Australia) Tia-Clair Toomey	03:56.12	514
4	(United States) Dallin Pepper	03:17.56	425	(United States) Danielle Brandon	03:58.11	346
5	(United States) Austin Hatfield	03:17.81	422	(United Kingdom) Lucy Campbell	04:00.11	441
6	(Switzerland) Colin Bosshard	03:18.23	253	(United States) Olivia Kerstetter	04:02.59	402
7	(United States) Isaac Newman	03:18.35	205	(United States) Fee Saghafi	04:03.28	316
8	(Germany) Moritz Fiebig	03:18.98	165	(United States) Alexis Raptis	04:05.33	263
9	(Canada) Jeffrey Adler	03:19.20	423	(United Kingdom) Aimee Cringle	04:06.04	363
10	(Finland) Jonne Koski	03:19.40	163	(France) Claudia Gluck	04:06.63	330
11	(United States) Colton Mertens	03:20.17	299	(United States) Haley Adams	04:07.88	301
12	(Brazil) Kalyan Souza	03:22.49	310	(United States) Brooke Wells	04:11.94	322
13	(United States) Justin Medeiros	03:23.16	444	(Mexico) Mariana Meza	04:11.98	145
14	(United States) Tudor Magda	03:23.65	309	(South Korea) Seungyeon Choi	04:13.10	198
15	(Authorised Neutral Athletes) Roman Khrennikov	03:23.74	410	(Switzerland) Mirjam Von Rohr	04:14.66	372
16	(Australia) Jay Crouch	03:24.32	450	(Canada) Anikha Greer	04:18.05	317
17	(United States) Jayson Hopper	03:24.78	467	(Australia) Madeline Sturt	04:18.46	371
18	(Italy) Enrico Zenoni	03:25.16	201	(Canada) Hattie Kanyo	04:19.95	229
19	(United Kingdom) Harry Lightfoot	03:28.67	385	(United States) Abigail Domit	04:25.59	276
20	(United States) Ty Jenkins	03:28.98	248	(United States) Lydia Fish	04:26.56	335
21	(Poland) Bronislaw Olenkowicz	03:36.73	174	(Canada) Carolyne Prevost	04:27.77	172
22	(United States) Jack Rozema	03:37.15	267	(Zimbabwe) Christina Livaditakis	04:31.95	162
23	(United States) William Leahy IV	03:40.19	180	(Canada) Sydney Michalyshen	04:33.62	219
24	(Australia) Peter Ellis	03:41.17	108	(Australia) Grace Walton	04:40.69	290
25	(United States) Chris Ibarra	03:42.59	215	(United States) Lexi Neely	04:41.16	225
26	(United States) Jorge Fernandez	03:46.51	170	(United Kingdom) Jennifer Muir	04:47.07	243
27	(United Kingdom) Toby Buckland	03:47.10	125	(Australia) Emily de Rooy	04:50.98	160
28	(United States) Nick Mathew	03:51.38	258	(Albania) Siria Meha	05:06.83	200
29	(Brazil) Henrique Moreira	03:51.83	66	(Colombia) Maria Camila Qintero	05:14.78	157
30	(Portugal) Tiago Luzes	03:52.82	93	(Brazil) Luiza Marques	05:18.21	30

=== Event 7: Hammer Down ===
Starting 1 minutes after event 6:

- 35-calorie C2 bike
- 28 bar muscle-ups
- 24 burpee box jump-overs

Women: 20-inch box

Men: 24-inch box

#	Men	Time	Pts Total	Women	Time	Pts Total
1	(Australia) Ricky Garard	04:17.54	529	(United Kingdom) Lucy Campbell	05:09.60	541
2	(United States) Colton Mertens	04:27.63	395	(Australia) Tia-Clair Toomey	05:26.50	610
3	(United States) James Sprague	04:38.85	516	(France) Claudia Gluck	05:27.14	422
4	(Authorised Neutral Athletes) Roman Khrennikov	04:39.20	498	(United States) Abigail Domit	05:33.50	364
5	(United States) Chris Ibarra	04:39.74	299	(United Kingdom) Aimee Cringle	05:39.63	447
6	(United States) Ty Jenkins	04:39.91	328	(United States) Arielle Loewen	05:41.45	456
7	(United States) Dallin Pepper	04:41.68	501	(Switzerland) Mirjam Von Rohr	05:47.35	448
8	(United States) Jayson Hopper	04:42.05	539	(Australia) Madeline Sturt	05:56.89	443
9	(Germany) Moritz Fiebig	04:43.70	233	(Republic of Ireland) Lucy McGonigle	05:58.47	376
10	(United States) Justin Medeiros	04:45.51	508	(United States) Lexi Neely	05:58.50	289
11	(United States) Austin Hatfield	04:45.81	482	(United States) Alexis Raptis	06:00.39	323
12	(Australia) Jay Crouch	04:49.66	506	(United States) Danielle Brandon	06:07.18	402
13	(Brazil) Henrique Moreira	04:54.57	118	(Canada) Anikha Greer	06:08.70	369
14	(Canada) Jeffrey Adler	04:58.32	471	(Canada) Carolyne Prevost	06:09.90	220
15	(Switzerland) Colin Bosshard	05:01.42	298	(Zimbabwe) Christina Livaditakis	06:12.82	207
16	(United States) William Leahy IV	05:01.47	222	(Mexico) Mariana Meza	06:14.03	187
17	(Finland) Jonne Koski	05:05.29	202	(Canada) Hattie Kanyo	06:16.04	268
18	(United Kingdom) Harry Lightfoot	05:10.21	421	(United States) Fee Saghafi	06:16.12	352
19	(United States) Jorge Fernandez	05:13.25	203	(United States) Lydia Fish	06:19.01	368
20	(Spain) Calum Clements	05:14.68	329	(Canada) Sydney Michalyshen	06:21.05	249
21	(Australia) Peter Ellis	05:17.80	135	(United States) Haley Adams	06:21.71	328
22	(Italy) Enrico Zenoni	05:18.37	225	(United States) Olivia Kerstetter	06:27.59	426
23	(Poland) Bronislaw Olenkowicz	05:18.87	195	(Australia) Grace Walton	06:33.43	311
24	(United States) Jack Rozema	05:21.41	285	(United Kingdom) Jennifer Muir	06:35.15	261
25	(Brazil) Kalyan Souza	05:22.67	325	(Colombia) Maria Camila Qintero	06:36.67	172
26	(United States) Tudor Magda	05:26.50	321	(Brazil) Luiza Marques	06:48.43	42
27	(Portugal) Tiago Luzes	05:55.57	102	(Albania) Siria Meha	07:21.20	209
28	(United States) Nick Mathew	05:55.60	264	(Australia) Emily de Rooy	07:36.26	166
29	(United Kingdom) Toby Buckland	06:11.73	128	(United States) Brooke Wells	07:48.39	325
30	(United States) Isaac Newman	06:39.36	205	(South Korea) Seungyeon Choi	CAP+3	198

=== Event 8: Going Dark ===
- 50/40 calories on the Echo bike
- 100-foot yoke carry
- 30 deficit handstand push-ups
- 100-foot yoke carry
- 50/40 calories on the Echo bike

Time cap: 15 min.

#	Men	Time	Pts Total	Women	Time	Pts Total
1	(United States) Austin Hatfield	08:16.43	582	(Australia) Tia-Clair Toomey	08:51.66	710
2	(United States) Jayson Hopper	08:26.17	635	(Australia) Grace Walton	09:32.20	407
3	(United States) Tudor Magda	08:27.34	413	(United States) Alexis Raptis	10:03.48	415
4	(Australia) Ricky Garard	08:33.19	617	(United Kingdom) Aimee Cringle	10:08.00	535
5	(United States) Dallin Pepper	08:36.50	585	(United States) Brooke Wells	10:12.38	409
6	(Australia) Jay Crouch	08:38.88	586	(Republic of Ireland) Lucy McGonigle	10:19.20	456
7	(United States) James Sprague	09:00.22	592	(United States) Lexi Neely	10:22.10	365
8	(Italy) Enrico Zenoni	09:22.79	297	(United States) Danielle Brandon	10:30.13	474
9	(Authorised Neutral Athletes) Roman Khrennikov	09:23.00	566	(United States) Olivia Kerstetter	10:36.28	494
10	(Finland) Jonne Koski	09:24.55	266	(Australia) Madeline Sturt	11:08.53	507
11	(Germany) Moritz Fiebig	09:39.43	293	(United States) Lydia Fish	11:23.91	428
12	(United States) Chris Ibarra	09:45.83	355	(United States) Arielle Loewen	11:34.13	512
13	(Canada) Jeffrey Adler	09:46.70	523	(United States) Abigail Domit	11:46.77	416
14	(Spain) Calum Clements	09:51.80	377	(Switzerland) Mirjam Von Rohr	11:56.70	496
15	(Switzerland) Colin Bosshard	09:56.50	343	(Zimbabwe) Christina Livaditakis	12:00.52	252
16	(United States) Ty Jenkins	09:59.00	370	(United States) Haley Adams	12:04.81	370
17	(United States) Colton Mertens	10:03.86	434	(United Kingdom) Lucy Campbell	12:24.06	580
18	(United Kingdom) Harry Lightfoot	10:38.29	457	(France) Claudia Gluck	12:25.60	458
19	(Poland) Bronislaw Olenkowicz	10:40.49	228	(United States) Fee Saghafi	12:33.18	385
20	(United Kingdom) Toby Buckland	11:09.51	158	(Canada) Anikha Greer	13:15.03	399
21	(United States) Jack Rozema	11:23.64	312	(Canada) Carolyne Prevost	13:37.93	277
22	(United States) Jorge Fernandez	11:25.43	227	(Australia) Emily de Rooy	13:46.79	190
23	(United States) Justin Medeiros	11:28.96	529	(Canada) Sydney Michalyshen	13:52.05	270
24	(United States) Nick Mathew	11:54.00	282	(Albania) Siria Meha	14:34.85	227
25	(United States) William Leahy IV	12:07.11	237	(Colombia) Maria Camila Qintero	14:52.07	187
26	(Brazil) Kalyan Souza	13:01.32	337	(Brazil) Luiza Marques	CAP+9	54
27	(United States) Isaac Newman	13:04.00	214	(Canada) Hattie Kanyo	CAP+12	277
28	(Brazil) Henrique Moreira	13:46.45	124	(Mexico) Mariana Meza	CAP+17	193
29	(Portugal) Tiago Luzes	14:08.64	105	(United Kingdom) Jennifer Muir	CAP+53	264
30	(Australia) Peter Ellis	CAP+17	135	(South Korea) Seungyeon Choi	CAP+55	198

=== Event 9: Running Isabel ===
5 rounds for time of:

- 200-foot run
- 6 snatches

Women: 105 lb

Men: 155 lb

#	Men	Time	Pts Total	Women	Time	Pts Total
1	(United States) Austin Hatfield	02:35.00	682	(Australia) Tia-Clair Toomey	02:37.83	810
2	(United States) Tudor Magda	02:36.02	509	(United States) Abigail Domit	02:40.39	512
3	(United States) Dallin Pepper	02:39.98	677	(United States) Danielle Brandon	02:42.32	566
4	(United States) Jack Rozema	02:42.30	400	(United Kingdom) Jennifer Muir	02:48.91	352
5	(United States) James Sprague	02:42.78	676	(United States) Olivia Kerstetter	02:50.00	578
6	(Canada) Jeffrey Adler	02:43.76	603	(United States) Arielle Loewen	02:54.39	592
7	(Australia) Jay Crouch	02:44.44	662	(Australia) Madeline Sturt	02:54.96	583
8	(Australia) Ricky Garard	02:48.11	689	(Canada) Anikha Greer	02:59.25	471
9	(United States) Nick Mathew	02:48.66	350	(Switzerland) Mirjam Von Rohr	03:00.41	564
10	(Brazil) Kalyan Souza	02:49.72	401	(United States) Alexis Raptis	03:00.47	479
11	(United States) Jayson Hopper	02:50.72	695	(Canada) Sydney Michalyshen	03:00.91	330
12	(United States) Justin Medeiros	02:53.26	585	(United Kingdom) Lucy Campbell	03:01.65	636
13	(United States) Chris Ibarra	02:54.54	407	(Australia) Grace Walton	03:03.78	459
14	(United States) Colton Mertens	02:55.23	482	(Canada) Hattie Kanyo	03:03.82	325
15	(Germany) Moritz Fiebig	02:55.68	338	(Zimbabwe) Christina Livaditakis	03:05.49	297
16	(United States) Ty Jenkins	02:56.11	412	(United Kingdom) Aimee Cringle	03:06.65	577
17	(Finland) Jonne Koski	02:56.83	305	(United States) Brooke Wells	03:06.67	448
18	(Switzerland) Colin Bosshard	02:57.60	379	(Mexico) Mariana Meza	03:07.77	229
19	(United States) Isaac Newman	02:58.72	247	(Republic of Ireland) Lucy McGonigle	03:08.82	489
20	(United States) Jorge Fernandez	03:00.11	257	(Canada) Carolyne Prevost	03:11.11	277
21	(Poland) Bronislaw Olenkowicz	03:01.98	255	(United States) Lexi Neely	03:13.92	392
22	(United Kingdom) Toby Buckland	03:01.98	185	(United States) Fee Saghafi	03:14.12	409
23	(United Kingdom) Harry Lightfoot	03:04.53	478	(South Korea) Seungyeon Choi	03:16.52	219
24	(Spain) Calum Clements	03:05.74	395	(United States) Haley Adams	03:20.04	388
25	(Brazil) Henrique Moreira	03:05.99	139	(Colombia) Maria Camila Qintero	03:23.04	202
26	(Portugal) Tiago Luzes	03:08.39	117	(United States) Lydia Fish	03:24.77	440
27	(United States) William Leahy IV	03:08.89	246	(France) Claudia Gluck	03:33.24	467
28	(Authorised Neutral Athletes) Roman Khrennikov	03:14.09	572	(Albania) Siria Meha	03:35.57	233
29	(Australia) Peter Ellis	03:19.36	138	(Australia) Emily de Rooy	03:36.76	193
30	(Italy) Enrico Zenoni	03:31.26	297	(Brazil) Luiza Marques	04:13.12	54

=== Event 10: Atlas ===
For time:

- 9/15/21 thrusters
- 3/5/7 rope climbs

Then,

- 100-foot overhead walking lunge

Women: 95 lb

Men: 135 lb

#	Men	Time	Pts Total	Women	Time	Pts Total
1	(United States) Justin Medeiros	07:53.42	685	(United States) Olivia Kerstetter	09:00.75	678
2	(United States) James Sprague	07:53.90	772	(United States) Danielle Brandon	09:13.77	662
3	(United States) Jayson Hopper	07:57.48	787	(Australia) Tia-Clair Toomey	09:46.38	902
4	(Authorised Neutral Athletes) Roman Khrennikov	08:09.43	660	(Canada) Anikha Greer	09:48.58	559
5	(Australia) Ricky Garard	08:14.05	773	(United Kingdom) Lucy Campbell	09:54.16	720
6	(United States) Dallin Pepper	08:21.31	757	(United States) Fee Saghafi	10:07.75	489
7	(Australia) Jay Crouch	08:27.94	738	(United States) Alexis Raptis	10:10.85	555
8	(Canada) Jeffrey Adler	08:38.42	675	(United States) Lydia Fish	10:28.60	512
9	(United States) Chris Ibarra	08:47.22	475	(Zimbabwe) Christina Livaditakis	10:33.50	365
10	(United States) Austin Hatfield	09:07.75	746	(Republic of Ireland) Lucy McGonigle	10:36.18	553
11	(Germany) Moritz Fiebig	09:09.70	398	(United States) Lexi Neely	10:49.00	452
12	(United States) Tudor Magda	09:16.42	565	(United States) Haley Adams	10:49.26	444
13	(United Kingdom) Harry Lightfoot	09:31.23	530	(South Korea) Seungyeon Choi	10:53.02	271
14	(Brazil) Kalyan Souza	09:33.94	449	(Australia) Madeline Sturt	10:53.32	631
15	(Finland) Jonne Koski	09:37.90	350	(Canada) Sydney Michalyshen	10:58.69	375
16	(Spain) Calum Clements	09:43.18	437	(United States) Brooke Wells	11:01.36	490
17	(United States) Nick Mathew	09:45.36	389	(United States) Arielle Loewen	11:08.04	631
18	(United States) Ty Jenkins	09:46.46	448	(Australia) Grace Walton	11:10.94	495
19	(Switzerland) Colin Bosshard	09:47.05	412	(France) Claudia Gluck	11:16.62	500
20	(Italy) Enrico Zenoni	09:47.55	327	(Switzerland) Mirjam Von Rohr	11:19.96	594
21	(United States) Colton Mertens	09:54.31	509	(United States) Abigail Domit	11:21.36	539
22	(Australia) Peter Ellis	CAP+1	162	(United Kingdom) Jennifer Muir	11:27.02	376
23	(Portugal) Tiago Luzes	CAP+2	138	(Albania) Siria Meha	11:39.02	254
24	(United States) Isaac Newman	CAP+2	265	(Colombia) Maria Camila Qintero	12:22.47	220
25	(United States) Jorge Fernandez	CAP+4	272	(Canada) Carolyne Prevost	12:38.35	292
26	(Poland) Bronislaw Olenkowicz	CAP+5	267	(Australia) Emily de Rooy	12:45.79	205
27	(United States) Jack Rozema	CAP+7	409	(United Kingdom) Aimee Cringle	12:52.90	586
28	(Brazil) Henrique Moreira	CAP+10	145	(Canada) Hattie Kanyo	12:54.82	331
29	(United States) William Leahy IV	CAP+10	249	(Brazil) Luiza Marques	14:31.85	57
30	(United Kingdom) Toby Buckland	CAP+13	185	(Mexico) Mariana Meza	14:34.07	229

=== Final standings ===
Men
#	Name	Pts
1	(United States) Jayson Hopper	787
2	(Australia) Ricky Garard	773
3	(United States) James Sprague	772
4	(United States) Dallin Pepper	757
5	(United States) Austin Hatfield	746
6	(Australia) Jay Crouch	738
7	(United States) Justin Medeiros	685
8	(Canada) Jeffrey Adler	675
9	(Authorised Neutral Athletes) Roman Khrennikov	660
10	(United States) Tudor Magda	565
11	(United Kingdom) Harry Lightfoot	530
12	(United States) Colton Mertens	509
13	(United States) Chris Ibarra	475
14	(Brazil) Kalyan Souza	449
15	(United States) Ty Jenkins	448
16	(Spain) Calum Clements	437
17	(Switzerland) Colin Bosshard	412
18	(United States) Jack Rozema	409
19	(Germany) Moritz Fiebig	398
20	(United States) Nick Mathew	389
21	(Finland) Jonne Koski	350
22	(Italy) Enrico Zenoni	327
23	(United States) Jorge Fernandez	272
24	(Poland) Bronislaw Olenkowicz	267
25	(United States) Isaac Newman	265
26	(United States) William Leahy IV	249
27	(United Kingdom) Toby Buckland	185
28	(Australia) Peter Ellis	162
29	(Brazil) Henrique Moreira	145
30	(Portugal) Tiago Luzes	138

Women
#	Name	Pts
1	(Australia) Tia-Clair Toomey	902
2	(United Kingdom) Lucy Campbell	720
3	(United States) Olivia Kerstetter	678
4	(United States) Danielle Brandon	662
5	(United States) Arielle Loewen	631
6	(Australia) Madeline Sturt	631
7	(Switzerland) Mirjam Von Rohr	594
8	(United Kingdom) Aimee Cringle	586
9	(Canada) Anikha Greer	559
10	(United States) Alexis Raptis	555
11	(Republic of Ireland) Lucy McGonigle	553
12	(United States) Abigail Domit	539
13	(United States) Lydia Fish	512
14	(France) Claudia Gluck	500
15	(Australia) Grace Walton	495
16	(United States) Brooke Wells	490
17	(United States) Fee Saghafi	489
18	(United States) Lexi Neely	452
19	(United States) Haley Adams	444
20	(United Kingdom) Jennifer Muir	376
21	(Canada) Sydney Michalyshen	375
22	(Zimbabwe) Christina Livaditakis	365
23	(Canada) Hattie Kanyo	331
24	(Canada) Carolyne Prevost	292
25	(South Korea) Seungyeon Choi	271
26	(Albania) Siria Meha	254
27	(Mexico) Mariana Meza	229
28	(Colombia) Maria Camila Qintero	220
29	(Australia) Emily de Rooy	205
30	(Brazil) Luiza Marques	57

== Team competition ==
=== Event 1: Team Run/Row/Run ===
For time:

- 4-mile run
- 3K row
- 2-mile run

=== Event 2: Conga Line ===
For time in MF/MF pairs, each pair completes:

- 15 wall walks
- 75 synchro double-unders
- 30 synchro toes-to-bars
- 75 synchro double-unders
- 30 synchro toes-to-bars

Then,

- 30 Worm cleans

=== Event 3:It's Complex - Pegboard ===
In FF/MM pairs, complete:

Max pegboard climbs in 5 minutes

=== Event 4: It's Complex - Lift ===
In FF/MM pairs, complete:

- Max-reps lifting complex in 5 minutes

Women: 95 lb

Men: 135 lb

=== Event 5: Up, Over, and Back ===
For time in FF/MM pairs:

3 rounds of:

- 40 synchro chest-to-bar pull-ups (Completed in alternating sets of 10)
- 10 Worm clean over-and-backs

Then, 3 rounds of:

- 28 synchro bar muscle-ups (Completed in alternating sets of 7)
- 7 Worm clean over-and-backst

=== Event 6: 1RM Back Squat ===
1-rep-max back squat

=== Event 7: All on the Line ===
For time:

- 100-foot handstand walk, each
- 30 deadlifts (805 lb)
- 30/25 calories on the Echo bike (M/F Pair 1)
- 30 wall-facing strict handstand push-ups (M/F Pair 2)
- 30/25 calories on the Echo bike (M/F Pair 2)
- 30 wall-facing strict handstand push-ups (M/F Pair 1)
- 30 deadlifts (805 lb)
- 100-foot handstand walk, each

=== Event 8: It All Adds Up ===
All for time:

- 21 Worm thrusters

Then,

- 4 rounds, alternating athletes on the rope, of:
- 3 rope climbs
- 7 synchro burpees over the Worm
- 15 Worm thrusters

Then,

4 rounds, alternating athletes on the rope, of:

- 2 rope climbs
- 5 synchro burpees over the Worm
- 9 Worm thrusters

Then,

- 4 rounds, alternating athletes on the rope, of:
- 1 rope climb
- 3 synchro burpees over the Worm

Then,

- 100-foot Worm lunge

Time cap: 11 minutes

=== Final standings ===
Teams
#	Name	Pts
1	(Norway) CrossFit Oslo Kriger	675
2	(United States) CrossFit Mayhem	660
3	(United States) Camel City CrossFit	595
4	(Denmark) CrossFit Butcher's Lab Vanløse	585
5	(United States) CrossFit Franco's EMOM Co	520
6	(United States) CrossFit Invictus	510
7	(United States) CrossFit 1124	440
8	(Canada) CrossFit Le Repere Mayhem	425
9	(United States) CrossFit PRVN	425
10	(United States) 8th Day CrossFit	405
11	(United Kingdom) Blueprint CrossFit Team AOD	400
12	(United States) CrossFit Greater Heights OverTake	370
13	(United States) CrossFit Undivided	330
14	(United States) CrossFit Hendersonville Mayhem	320
15	(Argentina) Q21 CrossFit	315
16	(United States) Camp Rhino CrossFit Dawgs	315
17	(Spain) CrossFit 4 Friends Smart	295
18	(United States) CrossFit Body Blueprint Conquer	290
19	(Sweden) CrossFit Prestanda	280
20	(United States) TTT CrossFit	220
