= Brent Fikowski =

Canadian CrossFit athlete

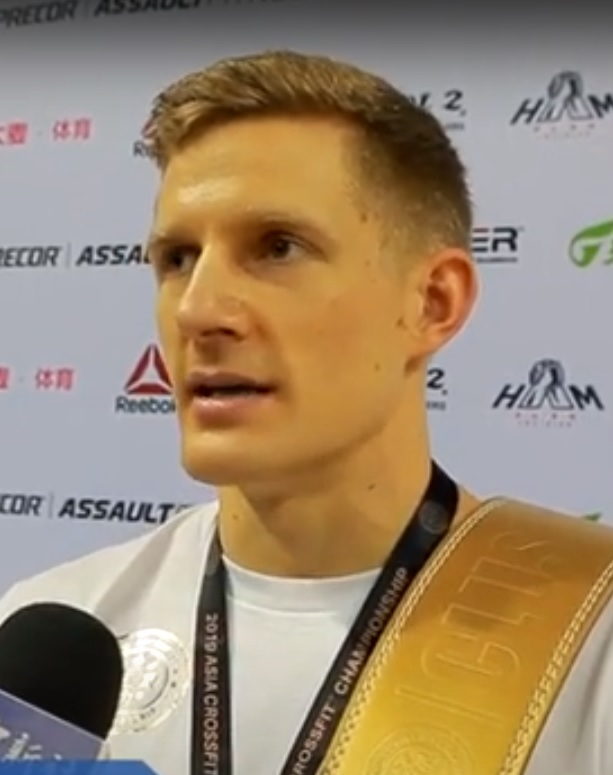
- Brent Fikowski in 2019

Personal information
- Nickname: The Professor
- Nationality: Canadian
- Citizenship: Canadian
- Born: Brent Fikowski; February 1991 (age 35) Lethbridge, Alberta
- Occupation: Professional CrossFit Athlete
- Years active: 2013–present
- Height: 1.88 m (6 ft 2 in)
- Weight: 100 kg (220 lb)
- Spouse: Claire Rostron
- Website: brentfikowski.com

Sport
- Sport: CrossFit
- Club: Unaffiliated

Achievements and titles
- Personal bests: Snatch: 136 kg (300 lb); Helen: 7:08
Medal record
CrossFit Games
Silver medal – second place	2017	Men
Bronze medal – third place	2021	Men
Bronze medal – third place	2024	Men
Rogue Invitational
Silver medal – second place	2024	Men

Brent Fikowski is a Canadian CrossFit athlete known for his eight appearances at the CrossFit Games. He finished second behind Mat Fraser at the 2017 Crossfit Games, and third in 2021 and 2024.

He serves as the president of the Professional Fitness Athlete's Association.

== Early life ==
Brent Fikowski grew up in the city of Lethbridge, Alberta, Canada. He competed in various sports, most notably swimming and volleyball. He swam competitively from the age of 6 to 18. He studied at G.S. Lakie Middle School, and Lethbridge Collegiate Institute. In 2009, he earned a volleyball scholarship at Lethbridge College where he studied for a diploma in business administration, majoring in accounting. He played for Lethbridge College Kodiaks, and his volleyball coach introduced him to CrossFit, which he then incorporated into his training. He was in a singing duo and once opened for Dr. Hook when he was 20. In 2011, he moved to Griffith University in the Gold Coast, Queensland, Australia, to continue his education, and earned a Bachelor of Commerce degree in 2013. He started competing in CrossFit competitions while in Australia. He worked as a financial controller in British Columbia after completing his studies, but left the job in 2018 to concentrate on CrossFit.

== Career ==
Brent began CrossFit as a way to improve volleyball, but quickly became a fixture on the regionals stage. After competing in a few local competitions in Australia, Brent competed in his first open in 2013, finishing 130th worldwide and qualifying for the 2013 Australia Regional. He would compete again the 2014 and 2015 Open and Regionals, finishing 3rd and 7th respectively, just outside of the Games cut line both years.

2016 was a breakout year for Fikowski. Prior to the Open, Brent went to Wodapalooza on a team of three and finished in first place. After finishing 24th in the world in the Open in 2016, he won the West regional. As a rookie at the 2016 CrossFit Games, Brent had the most number of wins over the course of the week for the men with 4, winning events 3, 8, 10 and 14, and finished in 4th place. To cap off the season, Brent competed on Team Canada at the CrossFit Invitational, earning a 4th-place finish alongside Michele Letendre, Carol-Ann Reason-Thibault, and Patrick Vellner.

In 2017, Brent would again win the West Regional and advance to the CrossFit Games. Brent would achieve his highest career Games finish with a 2nd place overall, including his first White Leader's Jersey, earned by winning the first event. He would also win the 8th event of the weekend.

Brent Fikowski would return to the CrossFit Games in 2018, again taking 1st in the West Regional, despite his worst ever finish in the CrossFit Open. He would just miss a podium spot, finishing 4th after losing out on the tiebreaker.

With a myriad of changes to the sport of CrossFit, Brent again did not live up to his earlier Open success, initially failing to qualify as either a Top 20 on the worldwide leaderboard or a national champion. He decided to compete in Shanghai at the Asia CrossFit Championship in April 2019, where he won handily, earning his spot to the 2019 CrossFit Games. He would then compete at the Granite Games, where he finished 2nd to Travis Mayer in a competition. At the 2019 CrossFit Games, Brent failed to finish higher than 13th in any event and was eliminated in 23rd place after the 5th event.

2020 was another year of major changes due to the COVID-19 pandemic. Brent drastically improved his Open standing, finishing 32nd worldwide. He chose to compete earlier in the season in 2020, taking first place at the Dubai CrossFit Championship and earning a CrossFit Games invite. With the Games being threatened by the pandemic, CrossFit decided to have an online qualifier with the 30 qualifiers. In Stage 1 of the 2020 CrossFit Games, Brent finished 15th overall and failed to earn a bid to Aromas.

A new year and new ownership brought additional changes to the sport of Crossfit. Brent again improved his performance in the Opening, finishing 22nd worldwide and 14th in North America, earning a spot to a new online qualifying round, the Quarterfinals. He finished 14th in the Quarterfinals, securing his spot in the next round at one of four North American semifinal events. Due to travel restrictions, Brent was forced to compete in the Atlas Games, which had been moved to a four-event virtual format. Despite being out of qualifying contention after Day 1, Fikowski secured two wins in the final two events to finish 5th and earn an invite to the 2021 Crossfit Games. Brent Fikowski earned the white leader's jersey by the end of Day 1. On Day 2, he had his best finish in Event 9 by winning the event. By the end of the competition, Brent was able to finish 3rd overall, returning to the podium for the first time since 2017.

== Professional Fitness Athletes' Association ==
On June 16, 2020, Fikowski founded the Professional Fitness Athletes' Association (PFAA) with other members of the fitness community to give voice to competitive fitness athletes and serve their interests. He has been the president since its founding. The PFAA became a focus of attention in 2024 when, at the 2024 CrossFit Games, a Serbian athlete Lazar Đukić (who was a member of PFAA's Athlete Board) died from drowning in the first event that involved an open-water swim. The Professional Fitness Athlete's Association called for transparency into the investigation of the drowning, the creation of an independent safety team, and the removal of the leader of the sport team, Dave Castro. Lazar Ðukić's death follows an incident during the 2017 CrossFit Games in which Fikowski saved fellow competitor Mat Fraser from drowning, according to Mat Fraser's at-the-time endurance coach, Chris Hinshaw.

== Personal life ==
Fikowski married Claire in September 2017 in Bali. Their daughter Evelyn was born in 2022.

== CrossFit Games results ==
Year	Games	Regional		Open (Worldwide)
2013	—	6th (Australia)		130th
2014	—	3rd (Canada West)		38th
2015	—	7th (West)		53rd (World)
2016	4th	1st (West)		24th (World)
2017	2nd	1st (West)		22nd (World)
2018	4th	1st (West)		184th (World)
Year	Games	Sanctional		Open
2019	23rd	1st (Asia CF Championship); 2nd (Granite Games)		183rd (World)
2020	15th (Stage 1)	1st (Dubai CF Championship)		32nd
Year	Games	Semifinal	Quarterfinal	Open
2021	3rd	5th (Atlas Games)	37th (North America)	22nd (World); 14th (North America)
2022	16th	1st (Granite Games)	36th (Worldwide); 21st (North America)	992nd (Worldwide); 481st (North America)
2023	4th	2nd (North America West)	28th (Worldwide); 7th (North America West)	389th (Worldwide); 71st (North America West)
2024	3rd	2nd (North America West)	51st (Worldwide); 7th (North America West)	92nd (Worldwide); 19th (North America West)
