= Kristin Rhodes =

American strength athlete

- Born: 10 September 1975 (age 50)
- Occupation: Strongwoman
- Height: 1.73 m (5 ft 8 in)
- Spouse: Donald Allan Rhodes
- Children: Cody Rhodes, Allyson Rhodes, Lindsay Rhodes

Kristin Rhodes née Danielson is an American strongwoman and the winner of 2012 World's Strongest Woman competition held in Hämeenlinna, Finland.

== Career ==
Granddaughter of shot putter Bill Nieder and the niece of middle distance runner Tim Danielson, Rhodes had been involved in sports at an early age, playing soccer at Grossmont High School and throwing the hammer, discus, javelin and the shot at San Diego State.

Rhodes started her strongwoman training under the guidance of her husband Donald Allan Rhodes, a California Highway Patrol officer and competitive strongman, and her first competition was in Santa Cruz, California in 2006. She emerged runner-up in 2008 World's Strongest Woman to Aneta Florczyk. She won her biggest accomplishment in the sport when he won 2012 World's Strongest Woman in Hämeenlinna, Finland. The following year she emerged runner-up to Kati Luoto. In 2015 she won Arnold Amateur Strongwoman World Championships. In 2016, she came fourth at World's Strongest Woman behind Donna Moore, Lidiia Hunko and Olga Liashchuk. Ensuing years she emerged back to back runner-up to Donna Moore in 2017 and Andrea Thompson in 2018. In 2017 Strongest Woman in the World at Las Vegas she came fourth behind Olga Liashchuk, Britteny Cornelius and Lidiia Hunko. At 2018 Arnold Pro Strongwoman she emerged second runner-up to Donna Moore and Liefia Ingalls.

== World records ==
In 2012 March, Rhodes broke the fingals fingers women's world record by flipping a 100 kg (220 lb) finger 5 times in 35.92 seconds. In May 2019, Rhodes became the first woman to lift the Rogue replica Dinnie Stones unassisted (without the use of lifting straps). During 2019 Rogue Record Breakers, she broke the world record for the women's monster dumbbell press with 79.5 kg (175 lb) and in following year shared the record with Donna Moore by pressing 81.5 kg (180 lb). During 2020 Rogue Record Breakers, she broke the world record for the women's elephant bar deadlift with 279.5 kg (616 lb) and became the first woman in history to deadlift six hundred pounds on the specially designed barbell.
