= 2024 Rogue Invitational =

Athletic competition

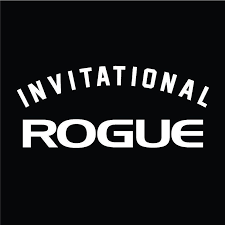
- Venue: P&J Live
- Location: Aberdeen, Scotland
- Dates: 8–10 November 2024

Champions
- CrossFit men: (Canada) Jeffrey Adler; CrossFit women: (Australia) Tia-Clair Toomey; Strongman: (Canada) Mitchell Hooper; Strongwoman: (Puerto Rico) Inez Carrasquillo

The 2024 Rogue Invitational was a sporting event organized by Rogue Fitness that featured competitions in the sport of CrossFit, strongman, and strongwoman. It was held at P&J Live in Aberdeen, Scotland from 8 to 10 November 2024, the first time the event was held outside the United States. The winners of the CrossFit competitions were Jeffrey Adler for the men and Tia-Clair Toomey for the women, while Mitchell Hooper and Inez Carrasquillo were the respective winners of the strongman and strongwoman competitions.

This Rogue Invitational featured its sixth CrossFit competition, 4th strongman, and its first strongwoman competition. 20 men and 20 women competed in the CrossFit divisions, and 10 men and 10 women competed in the strongman and strongwoman competitions. Rogue provided a prize purse of a million in cash and an investment of $275,000 of Bitcoin, with additional money from ticket and apparel sales going into the prize pot. The prize purse reached over $1.8 million, with the winners of the crossfit competitions receiving $274,000 with the Strongman and Strongwoman winners receiving around $122,000. The prize purse for strongwoman is the biggest in the history of the sport.

== Competitiors ==
This year, Rogue introduced a new ranking system based on the performance of athletes over a 5-year period, but weighted in favor of more recent competitions, such as the Open, Quarterfinals, CrossFit Games and Rogue Invitational. It includes an "Exceptions Points Table" to award points for those who missed a competition for any specific reason. The top 10 athletes in this system were invited to the Invitational, with five athletes from the Q online qualifiers, and five more at the discretion of Rogue.

Ten strongmen and ten strongwomen are invited.

=== CrossFit men ===
- (United States) Justin Medeiros
- (United States) James Sprague
- (United States) Sam Kwant
- (Finland) Jonne Koski
- (Canada) Brent Fikowski
- (United States) Chandler Smith
- (Australia) Jay Crouch
- (United States) Dallin Pepper
- (United States) Noah Ohlsen
- (Australia) Ricky Garard
- (United States) Jayson Hopper
- (Iceland) Bjorgvin Karl Gudmundsson
- (United States) Saxon Panchik
- (Canada) Pat Vellner
- (Canada) Jeff Adler
- (Greece) Giorgos Karavis
- (Canada) Sam Cournoyer
- (Brazil) Guilherme Malheiros
- (Finland) Henrik Haapalainen
- (United States) Jorge Fernandez

=== CrossFit women ===
- (United States) Arielle Loewen
- (Australia) Maddie Sturt
- (United States) Paige Semenza
- (United States) Amanda Barnhart
- (United States) Haley Adams
- (Canada) Emily Rolfe
- (Republic of Ireland) Emma McQuaid
- (United States) Brooke Wells
- (United States) Alex Gazan
- (United States) Dani Speegle
- (United States) Danielle Brandon
- (Poland) Gabi Migała
- (Hungary) Laura Horvath
- (Australia) Tia-Clair Toomey-Orr
- (Belgium) Manon Angonese
- (United States) Taylor Williamson
- (United States) Sydney Wells
- (Sweden) Emma Tall
- (United Kingdom) Tayla Howe
- (United States) Dana Paran

=== Strongman ===
- (Canada) Mitchell Hooper
- (Iceland) Hafthor Björnsson
- (Scotland) Tom Stoltman
- (United States) Bobby Thompson
- (Scotland) Luke Stoltman
- (United States) Evan Singleton
- (Ukraine) Pavlo Kordiyaka
- (Canada) Tristain Hoath
- (New Zealand) Mathew Ragg
- (United States) Thomas Evans

=== Strongwoman ===
- (United States) Angelica Jardine
- (Ukraine) Olga Liashchuk
- (United Kingdom) Lucy Underdown
- (United States) Hannah Linzay
- (Puerto Rico) Inez Carrasquillo
- (Canada) Samantha Belliveau
- (United Kingdom) Rebecca Roberts
- (United Kingdom) Donna Moore
- (Canada) Melissa Peacock
- (United Kingdom) Andrea Thompson

== CrossFit ==
=== Event 1 - Quick Sand ===
- 10 Rounds
- Sandbag Carry
- 400M Run

#	Men	Time	Pts Total	Women	Time	Pts Total
1	(Australia) Ricky Garard	18:43.48	100	(Australia) Tia-Clair Toomey-Orr	20:31.82	100
2	(Canada) Jeffrey Adler	18:43.65	95	(Poland) Gabriela Migała	20:42.54	95
3	(United States) Jayson Hopper	19:52.54	90	(Canada) Emily Rolfe	21:04.38	90
4	(United States) James Sprague	20:04.69	85	(Hungary) Laura Horvath	21:19.05	85
5	(Canada) Brent Fikowski	20:09.26	80	(United States) Haley Adams	21:37.32	80
6	(Canada) Sam Cournoyer	20:10.09	75	(United States) Brooke Wells	21:53.71	75
7	(Finland) Henrik Haapalainen	20:11.93	70	(United States) Danielle Brandon	21:57.73	70
8	(United States) Chandler Smith	20:13.74	65	(Sweden) Emma Tall	22:05.63	65
9	(Canada) Patrick Vellner	20:14.32	60	(Australia) Madeline Sturt	22:12.49	60
10	(United States) Dallin Pepper	20:17.31	55	(United States) Paige Semenza	22:20.97	55
11	(Australia) Jay Crouch	20:18.87	50	(United States) Sydney Wells	22:25.82	50
12	(United States) Jorge Fernandez	20:26.46	45	(United States) Arielle Loewen	22:33.94	45
13	(Iceland) Björgvin Karl Gudmundsson	20:27.48	40	(United States) Alex Gazan	22:33.94	40
14	(United States) Saxon Panchik	20:36.02	35	(United States) Amanda Barnhart	23:07.26	35
15	(United States) Justin Medeiros	20:36.61	30	(Belgium) Manon Angonese	23:27.81	30
16	(Finland) Jonne Koski	20:46.72	25	(Republic of Ireland) Emma McQuaid	23:31.90	25
17	(United States) Samuel Kwant	21:00.74	20	(United Kingdom) Tayla Howe	24:10.07	20
18	(United States) Noah Ohlsen	21:25.84	15	(United States) Dani Speegle	24:45.51	15
19	(Greece) Giorgos Karavis	22:14.82	10	(United States) Taylor Williamson	CAP+1 (10:38)	10
20	(Brazil) Guilherme Malheiros	22:26.05	0	(United States) Dana Paran	CAP+1 (11:14)	0

=== Event 2 - North Sea Tiger ===
- 32/26 Cal Echo Bike
- 16 Ring Muscle Ups
- 8 Squat Snatch (225/160 lb)
- 6 Shuttle Sprints

Time cap: 8 min.

#	Men	Time	Pts Total	Women	Time	Pts Total
1	(United States) Dallin Pepper	4:38.39	155	(Australia) Tia-Clair Toomey-Orr	5:29.37	200
2	(Brazil) Guilherme Malheiros	4:44.69	95	(Poland) Gabriela Migała	5:40.04	190
3	(Canada) Brent Fikowski	4:59.18	170	(Hungary) Laura Horvath	5:43.90	175
4	(United States) Jayson Hopper	5:06.81	175	(United States) Taylor Williamson	6:27.81	95
5	(Canada) Jeffrey Adler	5:08.46	175	(Belgium) Manon Angonese	6:44.82	110
6	(Australia) Ricky Garard	5:15.23	175	(United States) Haley Adams	6:49.20	155
7	(United States) Chandler Smith	5:24.23	135	(United States) Arielle Loewen	6:54.32	115
8	(United States) Samuel Kwant	5:24.47	85	(United States) Dana Paran	7:05.91	65
9	(Canada) Patrick Vellner	5:27.02	120	(United States) Paige Semenza	7:15.59	115
10	(United States) James Sprague	5:34.44	140	(United States) Danielle Brandon	7:18.26	125
11	(Greece) Giorgos Karavis	5:35.54	60	(United States) Alex Gazan	7:22.72	90
12	(Canada) Sam Cournoyer	5:43.25	120	(United States) Dani Speegle	7:33.44	60
13	(United States) Jorge Fernandez	5:44.72	85	(United States) Amanda Barnhart	7:48.11	75
14	(Finland) Henrik Haapalainen	5:46.58	105	(United States) Brooke Wells	7:51.80	110
15	(Iceland) Björgvin Karl Gudmundsson	5:48.54	70	(Sweden) Emma Tall	7:53.32	95
16	(United States) Justin Medeiros	6:06.47	55	(United Kingdom) Tayla Howe	CAP+0 (3:18)	45
17	(Australia) Jay Crouch	6:12.57	70	(Republic of Ireland) Emma McQuaid	CAP+0 (3:48)	45
18	(United States) Saxon Panchik	6:17.38	50	(Canada) Emily Rolfe	CAP+7	105
19	(Finland) Jonne Koski	6:33.70	35	(Australia) Madeline Sturt	CAP+11	70
20	(United States) Noah Ohlsen	7:04.27	15	(United States) Sydney Wells	CAP+14	50

=== Event 3 - Braveheart ===
- 8-6-4-2
- Wall Walk Complex
- Back Squat (375/260 lb)

#	Men	Time	Pts Total	Women	Time	Pts Total
1	(Canada) Jeffrey Adler	5:51.08	275	(Australia) Tia-Clair Toomey-Orr	6:14.89	300
2	(United States) Justin Medeiros	6:21.15	150	(United States) Brooke Wells	7:13.90	205
3	(Brazil) Guilherme Malheiros	6:28.89	185	(United States) Dani Speegle	7:15.67	150
4	(Australia) Jay Crouch	6:38.63	155	(Poland) Gabriela Migała	7:33.98	275
5	(United States) Jorge Fernandez	7:04.86	165	(United States) Sydney Wells	7:38.89	130
6	(United States) Chandler Smith	7:05.02	210	(United Kingdom) Tayla Howe	7:53.92	120
7	(Canada) Patrick Vellner	7:16.80	190	(United States) Arielle Loewen	8:04.33	185
8	(United States) Dallin Pepper	7:29.23	220	(Australia) Madeline Sturt	8:09.26	135
9	(United States) Noah Ohlsen	7:39.43	75	(Belgium) Manon Angonese	8:12.11	170
10	(Finland) Jonne Koski	7:50.22	90	(United States) Amanda Barnhart	8:38.91	130
11	(Australia) Ricky Garard	7:55.17	225	(Canada) Emily Rolfe	8:49.49	155
12	(United States) Jayson Hopper	8:05.65	220	(United States) Dana Paran	8:58.43	110
13	(Canada) Sam Cournoyer	8:21.13	160	(United States) Alex Gazan	9:05.63	130
14	(Finland) Henrik Haapalainen	8:29.61	140	(Hungary) Laura Horvath	9:24.66	210
15	(Iceland) Björgvin Karl Gudmundsson	8:35.48	100	(Sweden) Emma Tall	9:31.12	125
16	(United States) Samuel Kwant	9:02.80	110	(United States) Taylor Williamson	9:54.55	120
17	(United States) Saxon Panchik	9:08.92	70	(Republic of Ireland) Emma McQuaid	11:15.26	65
18	(Canada) Brent Fikowski	9:17.40	185	(United States) Paige Semenza	11:55.35	130
19	(United States) James Sprague	9:48.88	150	(United States) Haley Adams	CAP+12	165
20	(Greece) Giorgos Karavis	10:16.20	60	(United States) Danielle Brandon	CAP+16	125

=== Event 4 - Hunting Haggis ===
- 1000M Row
- 30 Thrusters (135/95 lb)
- 30/20 Log Muscle Ups
- 30 Thrusters (135/95 lb)
- 1000M Row

#	Men	Time	Pts Total	Women	Time	Pts Total
1	(Australia) Ricky Garard	15:20.49	325	(Australia) Tia-Clair Toomey-Orr	15:20.49	400
2	(United States) Dallin Pepper	15:32.24	315	(Hungary) Laura Horvath	15:14.43	305
3	(Canada) Jeffrey Adler	15:32.52	365	(United States) Arielle Loewen	15:29.32	275
4	(Australia) Jay Crouch	15:34.71	240	(United States) Alex Gazan	15:39.01	215
5	(Finland) Jonne Koski	15:54.27	170	(Australia) Madeline Sturt	15:57.08	215
6	(Canada) Brent Fikowski	15:54.59	260	(United States) Amanda Barnhart	CAP+0 (10:05)	205
7	(United States) Justin Medeiros	CAP+0 (9:52)	220	(Sweden) Emma Tall	CAP+0 (10:10)	195
8	(Canada) Patrick Vellner	CAP+1 (9:49)	255	(Belgium) Manon Angonese	CAP+2 (10:15)	235
9	(Iceland) Björgvin Karl Gudmundsson	CAP+2 (9:42)	160	(Poland) Gabriela Migała	CAP+2 (10:32)	335
10	(Brazil) Guilherme Malheiros	CAP+2 (9:59)	240	(United States) Paige Semenza	CAP+3	185
11	(Canada) Sam Cournoyer	CAP+3 (10:09)	210	(United States) Danielle Brandon	CAP+4	175
12	(United States) Chandler Smith	CAP+4 (10:10)	255	(Republic of Ireland) Emma McQuaid	CAP+6	110
13	(United States) Jorge Fernandez	CAP+4 (10:22)	205	(United States) Dani Speegle	CAP+7	190
14	(Greece) Giorgos Karavis	CAP+4 (10:49)	95	(United Kingdom) Tayla Howe	CAP+9	155
15	(United States) Samuel Kwant	CAP+5	140	(Canada) Emily Rolfe	CAP+10	185
16	(United States) Noah Ohlsen	CAP+6	100	(United States) Dana Paran	CAP+15	135
17	(United States) Saxon Panchik	CAP+9	90	(United States) Brooke Wells	CAP+16	225
18	(Finland) Henrik Haapalainen	CAP+14	155	(United States) Taylor Williamson	CAP+17	135
19	(United States) Jayson Hopper	CAP+16	230	(United States) Haley Adams	CAP+12	175
20	(United States) James Sprague	CAP+17	150	(United States) Sydney Wells	CAP+56	130

=== Event 5 - Devil's Tail ===
- 3 Rope Climbs
- 21 Single Arm Cyr Bell Devil Press (100/70 lb)
- 3 Rope Climbs
- 21 Single Arm Cyr Bell Devil Press (100/70 lb)
- 3 Rope Climbs

#	Men	Time	Pts Total	Women	Time	Pts Total
1	(United States) Jayson Hopper	6:39.53	330	(Hungary) Laura Horvath	6:33.76	405
2	(Canada) Jeffrey Adler	6:41.69	460	(Australia) Tia-Clair Toomey-Orr	6:47.09	495
3	(Australia) Ricky Garard	6:45.47	415	(Poland) Gabriela Migała	CAP+1	425
4	(Canada) Brent Fikowski	6:49.92	345	(Sweden) Emma Tall	CAP+3 (3:04)	280
5	(United States) Dallin Pepper	6:51.76	395	(United States) Brooke Wells	CAP+3 (3:20)	305
6	(Finland) Henrik Haapalainen	6:59.22	230	(Canada) Emily Rolfe	CAP+4	260
7	(Finland) Jonne Koski	CAP+1 (2:50)	240	(United States) Alex Gazan	CAP+5	285
8	(United States) Justin Medeiros	CAP+1 (2:55)	285	(United States) Sydney Wells	CAP+6	195
9	(United States) James Sprague	CAP+1 (2:56)	210	(Australia) Madeline Sturt	CAP+7 (3:31)	275
10	(Brazil) Guilherme Malheiros	CAP+1 (3:14)	295	(United States) Dani Speegle	CAP+7 (3:37)	245
11	(Canada) Patrick Vellner	CAP+2 (2:54)	305	(United States) Danielle Brandon	CAP+7 (3:42)	175
12	(Australia) Jay Crouch	CAP+2 (3:03)	285	(United States) Taylor Williamson	CAP+7 (3:47)	180
13	(United States) Saxon Panchik	CAP+2 (3:04)	130	(Belgium) Manon Angonese	CAP+8 (3:25)	280
14	(Canada) Sam Cournoyer	CAP+3 (3:17)	245	(United States) Paige Semenza	CAP+8 (3:34)	225
15	(United States) Samuel Kwant	CAP+4 (2:56)	170	(United States) Haley Adams	CAP+9	210
16	(United States) Chandler Smith	CAP+4 (3:13)	280	(United States) Arielle Loewen	CAP+10	305
17	(Iceland) Björgvin Karl Gudmundsson	CAP+7	180	(United States) Amanda Barnhart	CAP+11 (3:58)	230
18	(United States) Noah Ohlsen	CAP+8	115	(Republic of Ireland) Emma McQuaid	CAP+11 (4:01)	130
19	(United States) Jorge Fernandez	CAP+12	215	(United Kingdom) Tayla Howe	CAP+14	170
20	(Greece) Giorgos Karavis	CAP+16	95	(United States) Dana Paran	CAP+16	145

=== Event 6 - The Duel IV ===
- 5 Up and Over Hay Bale (changed to 5 Burpees Up and Over Hay Bale in later rounds)
- 50' Sled Push
- 4 Power Stair Steps (300/225 lb)

Both Gabriela Migala and Henrik Haapalainen withdrew due to Achilles injury in this event, and the event was changed to burpees up and over hay bale to eliminate athletes rebounding.

#	Men	Time	Pts Total	Women	Time	Pts Total
1	(Brazil) Guilherme Malheiros	5 (35.77)	395	(Hungary) Laura Horvath	5 (36.15)	505
2	(Canada) Brent Fikowski	5 (38.46)	440	(Sweden) Emma Tall	5 (39.79)	375
3	(Australia) Jay Crouch	4 (36.64)	375	(United States) Danielle Brandon	4 (37.93)	315
4	(Canada) Patrick Vellner	4 (36.97)	390	(United States) Dana Paran	4 (38.72)	220
5	(United States) James Sprague	4 (46.28)	290	(United States) Paige Semenza	4 (40.80)	300
6	(United States) Jayson Hopper	3 (37.28)	405	(United States) Alex Gazan	3 (39.57)	360
7	(United States) Jorge Fernandez	3 (37.64)	285	(Belgium) Manon Angonese	3 (40.53)	345
8	(Australia) Ricky Garard	3 (37.89)	480	(Australia) Tia-Clair Toomey-Orr	3 (40.56)	560
9	(Canada) Jeffrey Adler	3 (37.94)	520	(United States) Arielle Loewen	3 (42.27)	360
10	(United States) Dallin Pepper	3 (38.08)	450	(Poland) Gabriela Migała	3 (1:00) WD	480
11	(United States) Samuel Kwant	2 (32.74)	220	(United States) Haley Adams	2 (42.37)	255
12	(United States) Justin Medeiros	2 (33.79)	330	(United States) Amanda Barnhart	2 (43.28)	270
13	(Iceland) Björgvin Karl Gudmundsson	2 (34.90)	220	(Australia) Madeline Sturt	2 (43.84)	315
14	(United States) Noah Ohlsen	2 (44.52)	150	(United States) Sydney Wells	2 (52.14)	230
15	(Finland) Henrik Haapalainen	1 (34)	260	(Canada) Emily Rolfe	2 (52.90)	290
16	(Finland) Jonne Koski	1 (36.82)	265	(Republic of Ireland) Emma McQuaid	1 (45.11)	150
17	(United States) Saxon Panchik	1 (38.43)	150	(United Kingdom) Tayla Howe	1 (47.07)	185
18	(United States) Chandler Smith	1 (38.76)	295	(United States) Dani Speegle	1 (49.12)	260
19	(Greece) Giorgos Karavis	1 (40.88)	105	(United States) Brooke Wells	1 (54.23)	315
20	(Canada) Sam Cournoyer	1 (45.71)	245	(United States) Taylor Williamson	1 (55.70)	180

=== Event 7 - Gondola ===
- 1 Peg Board
- 60/48 Cal SkiErg
- 60 GHD
- 1 Peg Board
- 40/32 Cal SkiErg
- 40 GHD
- 1 Peg Board
- 20/16 Cal SkiErg
- 20 GHD
- 1 Peg Board

The peg board was held horizontally and the competitors had to traverse the peg board sideways.

#	Men	Time	Pts Total	Women	Time	Pts Total
1	(Canada) Brent Fikowski	13:30.49	540	(Hungary) Laura Horvath	13:34.65	605
2	(Australia) Jay Crouch	14:42.10	470	(Australia) Tia-Clair Toomey-Orr	14:38.23	655
3	(United States) Jayson Hopper	14:57.91	495	(United States) Alex Gazan	16:36.84	450
4	(Finland) Jonne Koski	15:03.83	350	(Australia) Madeline Sturt	16:57.88	400
5	(Canada) Jeffrey Adler	15:30.58	600	(Belgium) Manon Angonese	20:23.98	425
6	(United States) Chandler Smith	15:37.48	370	(United States) Sydney Wells	20:33.03	305
7	(United States) Saxon Panchik	15:42.27	220	(United States) Dani Speegle	23:51.50	330
8	(Brazil) Guilherme Malheiros	16:19.41	460	(United States) Dana Paran	CAP+2	285
9	(United States) Justin Medeiros	16:30.40	390	(United States) Taylor Williamson	CAP+30	240
10	(United States) Noah Ohlsen	18:47.33	205	(United States) Brooke Wells	CAP+38	370
11	(Canada) Patrick Vellner	18:58.95	440	(United States) Arielle Loewen	CAP+39 (18:14)	410
12	(Iceland) Björgvin Karl Gudmundsson	19:17.94	265	(United States) Amanda Barnhart	CAP+39 (18:26)	315
13	(Australia) Ricky Garard	19:30.27	520	(Canada) Emily Rolfe	CAP+40 (8:31.02)	330
14	(United States) Dallin Pepper	20:20.22	485	(Republic of Ireland) Emma McQuaid	CAP+40 (18:24.31)	185
15	(United States) Jorge Fernandez	20:29.84	315	(United States) Paige Semenza	CAP+49	330
16	(Canada) Sam Cournoyer	20:38.24	270	(Sweden) Emma Tall	CAP+113	400
17	(United States) James Sprague	21:47.44	310	(United States) Danielle Brandon	CAP+113	340
18	(United States) Samuel Kwant	22:32.41	235	(United States) Haley Adams	CAP+113	280
19	(Greece) Giorgos Karavis	CAP+247	115	(United Kingdom) Tayla Howe	CAP+114	195
20	(Finland) Henrik Haapalainen (WD)	—	260	(Poland) Gabriela Migała (WD)	—	480

=== Event 8 - Tight Rope ===
3 Rounds

- 100 Heavy Rope DU
- 50' Single Arm Cyr Bell Overhead Walking
- Lunge (100/70LB)
- 100' HS Walk

#	Men	Time	Pts Total	Women	Time	Pts Total
1	(United States) Justin Medeiros	8:25.76	490	(Hungary) Laura Horvath	8:28.45	705
2	(Australia) Jay Crouch	8:28.65	565	(Australia) Tia-Clair Toomey-Orr	9:23.53	750
3	(United States) James Sprague	8:31.70	400	(United States) Brooke Wells	9:34.99	460
4	(Canada) Brent Fikowski	8:52.19	625	(United States) Danielle Brandon	9:40.65	425
5	(United States) Saxon Panchik	8:58.58	300	(United States) Sydney Wells	10:30.67	385
6	(United States) Jayson Hopper	9:02.06	570	(United States) Dani Speegle	10:41.50	405
7	(United States) Dallin Pepper	9:12.38	555	(United States) Arielle Loewen	10:46.26	480
8	(Canada) Jeffrey Adler	9:16.29	665	(United States) Amanda Barnhart	11:24.28	380
9	(Finland) Jonne Koski	9:41.83	410	(Canada) Emily Rolfe	11:35.97	390
10	(Australia) Ricky Garard	9:56.58	575	(United Kingdom) Tayla Howe	11:43.88	250
11	(United States) Samuel Kwant	9:58.91	285	(Sweden) Emma Tall	11:46.01	450
12	(Brazil) Guilherme Malheiros	10:03.24	505	(United States) Paige Semenza	11:48.69	375
13	(Canada) Sam Cournoyer	10:05.96	310	(United States) Alex Gazan	11:59.85	490
14	(United States) Noah Ohlsen	10:42.55	240	(Australia) Madeline Sturt	12:17.13	435
15	(Canada) Patrick Vellner	10:45.52	470	(United States) Haley Adams	13:02.21	310
16	(United States) Chandler Smith	10:56.71	395	(United States) Taylor Williamson	13:30.81	265
17	(Iceland) Björgvin Karl Gudmundsson	11:05.55	285	(Belgium) Manon Angonese	14:47.67	445
18	(Greece) Giorgos Karavis	11:36.83	130	(Republic of Ireland) Emma McQuaid	15:02.60	200
19	(United States) Jorge Fernandez	11:56.79	325	(United States) Dana Paran	16:38.39	295
20	(Finland) Henrik Haapalainen (WD)	—	260	(Poland) Gabriela Migała (WD)	—	480

=== Event 9 - The Excavator ===
For Time:

- 15 Sandbag Clean (150/125LB)
- 10 Sandbag Clean (200/150LB)
- 5 Sandbag Clean (225/175LB)

#	Men	Time	Pts Total	Women	Time	Pts Total
1	(United States) Jayson Hopper	3:08.81	670	(Australia) Tia-Clair Toomey-Orr	4:13.28	850
2	(United States) Dallin Pepper	3:14.98	650	(United States) Dani Speegle	4:17.05	500
3	(Canada) Brent Fikowski	3:19.62	715	(United States) Arielle Loewen	5:03.20	570
4	(Canada) Jeffrey Adler	3:27.99	750	(Hungary) Laura Horvath	5:04.59	790
5	(United States) Samuel Kwant	3:40.54	365	(United States) Brooke Wells	5:08.15	540
6	(Australia) Ricky Garard	3:41.58	650	(United States) Alex Gazan	5:09.37	565
7	(United States) Jorge Fernandez	3:45.74	325	(United States) Haley Adams	5:16.92	380
8	(Finland) Jonne Koski	3:53.59	410	(United States) Paige Semenza	5:24.31	440
9	(Brazil) Guilherme Malheiros	4:06.98	505	(Canada) Emily Rolfe	5:28.71	450
10	(United States) James Sprague	4:12.87	400	(Sweden) Emma Tall	5:32.04	505
11	(Iceland) Björgvin Karl Gudmundsson	4:23	285	(United States) Sydney Wells	5:42.46	435
12	(Canada) Sam Cournoyer	4:24.58	310	(United States) Amanda Barnhart	5:45.33	425
13	(Canada) Patrick Vellner	4:29.49	470	(Australia) Madeline Sturt	5:49.87	475
14	(Australia) Jay Crouch	4:30.35	650	(Belgium) Manon Angonese	6:47.17	480
15	(United States) Saxon Panchik	4:37.29	300	(United States) Taylor Williamson	CAP+1 (4:00)	295
16	(Greece) Giorgos Karavis	4:55.66	130	(United States) Danielle Brandon	CAP+1 (4:10)	450
17	(United States) Justin Medeiros	4:59.60	490	(United States) Dana Paran	CAP+2 (4:14)	315
18	(United States) Chandler Smith	5:47.06	450	(United Kingdom) Tayla Howe	CAP+4 (5:02)	265
19	(United States) Noah Ohlsen	6:37.27	240	(Republic of Ireland) Emma McQuaid	CAP+4 (5:12)	210
20	(Finland) Henrik Haapalainen (WD)	—	260	(Poland) Gabriela Migała (WD)	—	480

=== Final standings ===
Men
#	Name	Pts
1	(Canada) Jeffrey Adler	750
2	(Canada) Brent Fikowski	715
3	(United States) Jayson Hopper	670
4	(Australia) Ricky Garard	650
5	(United States) Dallin Pepper	650
6	(Australia) Jay Crouch	600
7	(Brazil) Guilherme Malheiros	565
8	(United States) Justin Medeiros	510
9	(Canada) Patrick Vellner	510
10	(Finland) Jonne Koski	475
11	(United States) James Sprague	455
12	(United States) Chandler Smith	410
13	(United States) Jorge Fernandez	395
14	(United States) Samuel Kwant	365
15	(Canada) Sam Cournoyer	355
16	(Iceland) Björgvin Karl Gudmundsson	335
17	(United States) Saxon Panchik	330
18	(Finland) Henrik Haapalainen	260
19	(United States) Noah Ohlsen	250
20	(Greece) Giorgos Karavis	155

Women
#	Name	Pts
1	(Australia) Tia-Clair Toomey-Orr	850
2	(Hungary) Laura Horvath	790
3	(United States) Arielle Loewen	570
4	(United States) Alex Gazan	565
5	(United States) Brooke Wells	540
6	(Sweden) Emma Tall	505
7	(United States) Dani Speegle	500
8	(Poland) Gabriela Migała	480
9	(Belgium) Manon Angonese	480
10	(Australia) Madeline Sturt	475
11	(United States) Danielle Brandon	450
12	(Canada) Emily Rolfe	450
13	(United States) Paige Semenza	440
14	(United States) Sydney Wells	435
15	(United States) Amanda Barnhart	425
16	(United States) Haley Adams	380
17	(United States) Dana Paran	315
18	(United States) Taylor Williamson	295
19	(United Kingdom) Tayla Howe	265
20	(Republic of Ireland) Emma McQuaid	210

== Strongman and strongwoman ==
=== Event 1: Deadlift ladder ===
- Men's format: Athletes have 3 attempts to lift the highest amount of weight from a choice of 10 stations, the first 9 are pre-loaded stations ranging from 363 kilograms (800 lb) to 442 kilograms (975 lb). The 10th station known as the max platform will be loaded to the athlete's desired weight with a 454 kilogram (1000 lb) minimum.
- Women's format: Athletes have 3 attempts to lift the highest amount of weight from a choice of 10 stations, the stations are pre-loaded with weights ranging from 229 kilograms (505 lb) to 311 kilograms (685 lb).
- Equipment: This event is in a strongman raw format where basic straps are allowed. Figure of 8 straps and deadlift suits are not allowed.
- Notes: 3 lifts per athlete. Athletes can not go down in weight.

Men					Women				
Place	Athlete	Weight	Event points	Overall points	Place	Athlete	Weight	Event points	Overall points
1	(Iceland) Hafþór Björnsson	458 kilograms (1,010 lb)	10	10	1	(United Kingdom) Lucy Underdown	311 kilograms (685 lb)	10	10
2	(Canada) Mitchell Hooper	442 kilograms (975 lb)	9	9	2	(United Kingdom) Andrea Thompson	302 kilograms (665 lb)	9	9
3	(New Zealand) Mathew Ragg	431 kilograms (950 lb)	8	8	3	(Ukraine) Olga Liashchuk	283 kilograms (625 lb)	8	8
4	(United States) Evan Singleton	419.5 kilograms (925 lb)	6.5	6.5	4	(Puerto Rico) Inez Carrasquillo	274 kilograms (605 lb)	7	7
4	(United States) Bobby Thompson	419.5 kilograms (925 lb)	6.5	6.5	5	(United States) Angelica Jardine	265 kilograms (585 lb)	6	6
6	(United States) Thomas Evans	410.5 kilograms (905 lb)	5	5	6	(United Kingdom) Rebecca Roberts	256 kilograms (565 lb)	4.5	4.5
7	(Scotland) Tom Stoltman	397 kilograms (875 lb)	4	4	6	(Canada) Melissa Peacock	256 kilograms (565 lb)	4.5	4.5
8	(Scotland) Luke Stoltman	381 kilograms (840 lb)	3	3	8	(United States) Hannah Linzay	247 kilograms (545 lb)	3	3
9	(Canada) Tristain Hoath	372 kilograms (820 lb)	2	2	9	(United Kingdom) Donna Moore	238 kilograms (525 lb)	2	2
10	(Ukraine) Pavlo Kordiyaka	363 kilograms (800 lb)	1	1	10	(Canada) Samantha Belliveau	229 kilograms (505 lb)	1	1

=== Event 2: Grip and press ===
- Men's format: Athletes have to complete a 113 kilogram (250 lb) farmers walk down a 12.2 metre (40 ft) course and then attempt 3 lifts of a 172 kilogram (380 lb) log.
- Women's format: Athletes have to complete a 102 kilogram (225 lb) farmers walk down a 12.2 metre (40 ft) course and then attempt 3 lifts of a 118 kilogram (260 lb) log.
- Time Limit: 2 minute 30 seconds

Men					Women				
Place	Athlete	Time	Event points	Overall points	Place	Athlete	Time	Event points	Overall points
1	(United States) Thomas Evans	4 in 37.01	10	15	1	(Puerto Rico) Inez Carrasquillo	4 in 36.17	10	17
2	(Canada) Mitchell Hooper	4 in 37.03	9	18	2	(United Kingdom) Andrea Thompson	4 in 43.94	9	18
3	(Scotland) Tom Stoltman	4 in 39.77	8	12	3	(United States) Angelica Jardine	3 in 54.31	8	14
4	(United States) Evan Singleton	4 in 42.13	7	13.5	4	(Ukraine) Olga Liashchuk	3 in 1:19.31	7	15
5	(Scotland) Luke Stoltman	4 in 1:58.86	6	9	5	(United States) Hannah Linzay	1 in 7.37	6	9
6	(New Zealand) Mathew Ragg	3 in 1:01.50	5	13	6	(Canada) Melissa Peacock	1 in 7.41	5	9.5
7	(United States) Bobby Thompson	3 in 1:04.50	4	10.5	7	(United Kingdom) Lucy Underdown	1 in 9.05	4	14
8	(Ukraine) Pavlo Kordiyaka	3 in 2:06.00	3	4	8	(United Kingdom) Rebecca Roberts	1 in 9.88	3	7.5
9	(Iceland) Hafþór Björnsson	2 in 38.07	2	12	9	(United Kingdom) Donna Moore	1 in 10.54	2	4
10	(Canada) Tristain Hoath	2 in 1:57.00	1	3	10	(Canada) Samantha Belliveau	1 in 10.69	1	2

=== Event 3: Inver challenge ===
- Men's format: Athletes attempt to lift 5 Inver stones weighing 125 kg (275 lb), 136 kg (300 lb), 166 kg (365 lb), 181 kg (400 lb), and 191 kg (420 lb) on to barrels in the fastest time possible.
- Women's format: Athletes attempt to lift 5 Inver stones weighing 91 kg (200 lb), 102 kg (225 lb), 113 kg (250 lb), 125 kg (275 lb), and 136 kg (300 lb) on to barrels in the fastest time possible.
- Time limit: 2 minutes
- Notes: Use of tacky is not allowed

Men					Women				
Place	Athlete	Time	Event points	Overall points	Place	Athlete	Time	Event points	Overall points
1	(Iceland) Hafþór Björnsson	5 in 27.34	10	22	1	(Puerto Rico) Inez Carrasquillo	5 in 34.24	10	27
2	(Canada) Mitchell Hooper	5 in 31.80	9	27	2	(United States) Angelica Jardine	5 in 51.00	9	23
3	(Scotland) Tom Stoltman	5 in 36.57	8	20	3	(Ukraine) Olga Liashchuk	5 in 1:04.28	8	23
4	(Ukraine) Pavlo Kordiyaka	5 in 1:20.57	7	11	4	(United Kingdom) Rebecca Roberts	5 in 1:24.85	7	14.5
5	(United States) Evan Singleton	4 in 29.99	6	19.5	5	(United Kingdom) Lucy Underdown	4 in 31.14	6	20
6	(Scotland) Luke Stoltman	4 in 1:01.79	5	14	6	(United States) Hannah Linzay	4 in 52.41	5	14
7	(Canada) Tristain Hoath	3 in 17.73	4	7	7	(United Kingdom) Donna Moore	4 in 1:26.44	4	8
8	(New Zealand) Mathew Ragg	3 in 29.31	3	16	8	(Canada) Samantha Belliveau	3 in 18.20	3	5
9	(United States) Bobby Thompson	3 in 36.02	2	12.5	9	(Canada) Melissa Peacock	3 in 21.36	2	11.5
10	(United States) Thomas Evans	2 in 13.11	1	16	10	(United Kingdom) Andrea Thompson	3 in 22.53	1	19

=== Event 4: Power drive ===
- Men's format: Athletes attempt 3 movements, a 340 kilogram bale (750 lb) push, a 170 kilogram (375 lb) husafell sandbag carry then a 295 kilogram (650 lb) sled pull.
- Women's format: Athletes attempt 3 movements, a 272 kilogram bale (600 lb) push, a 113 kilogram (250 lb) husafell sandbag carry then a 213 kilogram (470 lb) sled pull.
- Course distance: 12.2 metres (40 ft)
- Time limit: 1 minute 30 seconds

Men					Women				
Place	Athlete	Time	Event points	Overall points	Place	Athlete	Time	Event points	Overall points
1	(Scotland) Tom Stoltman	1:04.81	10	30	1	(United Kingdom) Lucy Underdown	1:10.64	10	30
2	(Iceland) Hafþór Björnsson	1:09.04	9	31	2	(Ukraine) Olga Liashchuk	1:15.00	9	32
3	(Canada) Mitchell Hooper	1:21.21	8	35	3	(Puerto Rico) Inez Carrasquillo	1:16.03	8	35
4	(Ukraine) Pavlo Kordiyaka	1:26.95	7	18	4	(United Kingdom) Rebecca Roberts	1:22.12	7	21.5
5	(United States) Evan Singleton	1:28.02	6	25.5	5	(Canada) Melissa Peacock	CAP + 0	6	17.5
6	(Scotland) Luke Stoltman	CAP + 1	5	19	6	(Canada) Samantha Belliveau	CAP + 1	5	10
7	(United States) Bobby Thompson	CAP + 1	4	16.5	7	(United States) Hannah Linzay	CAP + 1	4	18
8	(Canada) Tristain Hoath	CAP + 1	3	10	8	(United States) Angelica Jardine	CAP + 1	3	26
9	(New Zealand) Mathew Ragg	CAP + 1	2	18	9	(United Kingdom) Andrea Thompson	CAP + 1	2	21
10	(United States) Thomas Evans	CAP + 2	1	17	10	(United Kingdom) Donna Moore	CAP + 1	1	9

=== Event 5: Yoke escalator ===
- Men's format: Athletes attempt to carry a 408 kilogram (900 lb) yoke down a 12.2 metres (40 ft) course. They then attempt to lift 3 implements weighing 227 kilograms (500 lb), 250 kilograms (550 lb) and 272 kilograms (600 lb) up 4 stairs.
- Women's format: Athletes attempt to carry a 272 kilogram (600 lb) yoke down a 12.2 metres (40 ft) course. They then attempt to lift 3 implements weighing 102 kilograms (225 lb), 125 kilograms (275 lb) and 147 kilograms (325 lb) up 4 stairs.
- Time limit: 2 minute 30 seconds

Men					Women				
Place	Athlete	Time	Event points	Overall points	Place	Athlete	Time	Event points	Overall points
1	(Canada) Mitchell Hooper	35.35	10	45	1	(Canada) Samantha Belliveau	34.87	10	20
2	(United States) Evan Singleton	36.98	9	34.5	2	(Canada) Melissa Peacock	34.93	9	26.5
3	(United States) Thomas Evans	41.22	8	25	3	(Puerto Rico) Inez Carrasquillo	35.35	8	43
4	(Iceland) Hafþór Björnsson	41.32	7	38	4	(Ukraine) Olga Liashchuk	35.67	7	39
5	(Scotland) Tom Stoltman	41.79	6	36	5	(United Kingdom) Lucy Underdown	37.28	6	36
6	(New Zealand) Mathew Ragg	45.79	5	23	6	(United States) Angelica Jardine	38.08	5	31
7	(United States) Bobby Thompson	49.39	4	20.5	7	(United States) Hannah Linzay	39.03	4	22
8	(Scotland) Luke Stoltman	54.93	3	22	8	(United Kingdom) Rebecca Roberts	42.67	3	24.5
9	(Canada) Tristain Hoath	1:02.31	2	12	9	(United Kingdom) Andrea Thompson	44.00	2	23
10	(Ukraine) Pavlo Kordiyaka	CAP + 1	1	19	10	(United Kingdom) Donna Moore	55.45	1	10

=== Event 6: Circus medley ===
- Men's format: Athletes attempt to lift 4 implements a 95 kilogram (210 lb) kettlebell, a 115 kilogram (253 lb) cyr dumbbell and two barbells weighing 170 (375 lb) and 184 kilograms (405 lb).
- Women's format: Athletes attempt to lift 4 implements a 56 kilogram (124 lb) kettlebell, a 72 kilogram (150 lb) cyr dumbbell and two barbells weighing 107 (235 lb) and 113 kilograms (250 lb).
- Time limit: 2 minutes

Men					Women				
Place	Athlete	Time	Event points	Overall points	Place	Athlete	Time	Event points	Overall points
1	(Scotland) Luke Stoltman	4 in 105.69	10	32	1	(Puerto Rico) Inez Carrasquillo	4 in 56.34	10	53
2	(Canada) Mitchell Hooper	4 in 111.61	9	54	2	(United States) Angelica Jardine	4 in 109.85	9	40
3	(Scotland) Tom Stoltman	3 in 36.18	8	44	3	(Ukraine) Olga Liashchuk	4 in 110.80	8	47
4	(United States) Evan Singleton	3 in 44.26	7	41.5	4	(United States) Hannah Linzay	3 in 61.33	7	29
5	(Iceland) Hafþór Björnsson	3 in 70.83	6	44	5	(Canada) Samantha Belliveau	2 in 17.81	6	26
6	(United States) Thomas Evans	3 in 71.06	5	30	6	(United Kingdom) Lucy Underdown	2 in 35.38	5	41
7	(New Zealand) Mathew Ragg	2 in 66.29	4	27	7	(United Kingdom) Rebecca Roberts	1 in 39.34	4	28.5
8	(United States) Bobby Thompson	1 in 13.47	3	23.5	8	(United Kingdom) Andrea Thompson	1 in 62.80	3	26
9	(Canada) Tristain Hoath	(no lift)	1.5	13.5	9	(Canada) Melissa Peacock	(no lift)	2	28.5
10	(Ukraine) Pavlo Kordiyaka	(no lift)	1.5	20.5	—	(United Kingdom) Donna Moore	—	—	10

=== Final standings ===
Men
Place	Athlete	Points
1st place, gold medalist(s)	(Canada) Mitchell Hooper	54
2nd place, silver medalist(s)	(Iceland) Hafþór Björnsson	44
2nd place, silver medalist(s)	(Scotland) Tom Stoltman	44
4	(United States) Evan Singleton	41.5
5	(Scotland) Luke Stoltman	32
6	(United States) Thomas Evans	30
7	(New Zealand) Mathew Ragg	27
8	(United States) Bobby Thompson	23.5
9	(Ukraine) Pavlo Kordiyaka	20.5
10	(Canada) Tristain Hoath	13.5

Women
Place	Athlete	Points
1st place, gold medalist(s)	(Puerto Rico) Inez Carrasquillo	53
2nd place, silver medalist(s)	(Ukraine) Olga Liashchuk	47
3rd place, bronze medalist(s)	(United Kingdom) Lucy Underdown	41
4	(United States) Angelica Jardine	40
5	(United States) Hannah Linzay	29
6	(United Kingdom) Rebecca Roberts	28.5
7	(Canada) Melissa Peacock	28.5
8	(Canada) Samantha Belliveau	26
9	(United Kingdom) Andrea Thompson	26
10	(United Kingdom) Donna Moore	10
