= Rebecca Lorch =

American weightlifter and strongwoman (1990–2022)

Personal information
- Born: February 20, 1990 Dallas, Texas
- Died: December 18, 2022 (aged 32)
- Education: Adelphi University; Montclair University
- Occupation(s): Powerlifter and nutritionist

Sport
- Sport: Strongwomen and powerlifting

Rebecca Anne Lorch (February 20, 1990 – December 18, 2022) was an American competitive weightlifter and strongwoman. She was a nutritionist and became interested in strength competitions after surviving a serious motorcycle accident. She would go on to win the lightweight classes of the 2019 and 2020 editions of America's Strongest Women competition. Lorch died of suicide at age 32.

== Biography ==
Lorch was born in Dallas to Susan Steiner and Leonard Lorch. She grew up in Mesquite, Texas, with an elder brother, Jeremy. She attended Adelphi University as a theater major. Just before graduation she had a motorcycle accident that caused damage to her leg; during rehabilitation she developed an interest in nutrition and returned to school for a master's degree at Montclair State University.

== Strength competitions ==
Lorch started competing as a powerlifter and then entered strongwoman events in 2015. While competing she also worked as a nutrition coach.

In 2014, she won her division at the Dominion and Heatwave 2 competitions, with a bench press of 135 and 170 lbs respectively. The next year, she placed first in the Dominion competition, with a 245 lb squat and a 315 lb deadlift. As a weightlifter, her personal bests in competition were 297.6 (squat), 192.9 (bench) and 347.2 (deadlift).

In 2017, she had progressed to the national level of competition, but broke an ankle in a workplace accident which caused a disruption to her competition schedule.

After recovery, Lorch won the lightweight class of America's Strongest Woman in 2019 and 2020. The Strongest Woman event includes six different disciplines over the course of two days: Circus bell press reps, Sandbag toss, Basket deadlift, Arm over Arm Truck pull, Husafell Carry, and Sandbag Carry.

=== 2021-2022 seasons ===
At the start of the 2021 season, she was named one of the top 10 strong women athletes to watch. While training for the World's Strongest Woman competition, she suffered a bicep tear in training which derailed her competition season. The injury caused her to adjust her coaching and training regime, and was suffering from depression. Later that year, Lorch left her coach and partner and moved home to Connecticut to recover with her family. She remained active in the strongman community, hosting the 2022 Brooklyn's Strongest competition with World's Strongest Man Tommy Lovell in February 2022.

After recovery, she returned to competition. In March 2022, she placed tenth at the Arnold Strongwoman Classic. In April 2022, she placed sixth at the 2022 Strengthlete Collective Clash on the Coast in the under 82 kg division.

=== Death and legacy ===
Lorch died by suicide on December 18, 2022, in Connecticut. After her death, members of the strongman community spoke out in support of Lorch, starting the #JusticeForRebecca campaign, against harassment and sexual misconduct in strength competitions.

In 2023, the "Punks for a Cause" concert was organized in New Haven in Lorch's memory to raise money for mental health advocacy.
