= Inez Carrasquillo =

American strongwoman

Personal information
- Nationality: Puerto Rican
- Born: February 14, 1994 (age 32) Chicago, Illinois
- Occupation: Strongwoman
- Height: 1.85 m (6 ft 1 in)
- Weight: 107 kg (236 lb; 16 st 12 lb)

Sport
- Sport: Strength athletics
- Coached by: Niko Chaprales (2025 - present)
Medal record
Strongman
Representing Puerto Rico
World's Strongest Woman
| 8th | 2021 World's Strongest Woman |
| 3rd | 2022 World's Strongest Woman |
| 4th | 2023 World's Strongest Woman |
Arnold Pro Strongman World Series
| 5th | 2023 Arnold Strongwoman Classic |
| 5th | 2024 Arnold Strongwoman Classic |
| 1st | 2025 Arnold Strongwoman Classic |
| 2nd | 2026 Arnold Strongwoman Classic |
Rogue Invitational
| 1st | 2024 Rogue Invitational |
| 1st | 2025 Rogue Invitational |
| 2nd | 2026 Rogue Invitational |
Arnold Amateur Strongwoman World Series
| 1st | 2022 Arnold Amateur Strongwoman |
| 5th | 2024 Arnold UK |
North America's Strongest Woman
| 1st | 2024 NA Strongest Woman |
| 2nd | 2026 NA Strongest Woman |
America's Strongest Woman
| 3rd | 2022 America's Strongest Woman |
| 1st | 2026 America's Strongest Woman |

Inez Carrasquillo (born 14 February 1994) is a Puerto Rican-American strongwoman competitor and tech industry professional.

Known for her prowess in overhead lifts, she holds women's log lift record in strongwoman with 147.05 kg (324.2 lb).

== Early life ==
Carrasquillo was born in Chicago to Puerto Rican parents. She and her sisters were adopted by their grandmother, who worked as a bus driver to support them. She was encouraged to pursue sports due to her height, competing in volleyball and shot put.

== Career ==
Carrasquillo started with powerlifting, competing in three USA Powerlifting meets and winning all three. She achieved a total of 657.5 kg (1,450 lb), the 19th-best women's total at the time. Afterwards, her coach Alec Pagan offered to help her compete in strongwoman.

She competed in her first amateur competition, Rainier Pro-Am, after four weeks of training, taking second. She then competed at 2021 Official Strongman Games, tying for third. She continued to compete in amateur competitions, winning the 2022 Arnold Amateur Strongwoman World Series while taking first place in every event.

Carrasquillo turned pro with America's Strongest Woman and the Beerstone competition in 2022; winning the latter.

In 2023, Carrasquillo broke the women's log lift record with 145.78 kg (321.4 lb) and made her first appearance at the Arnold Strongwoman Classic, where she emerged fifth.

At 2024 Arnold Strongwoman Classic, Carrasquillo got injured during timber carry event, smashing her face into the implement. Despite severe swelling, she completed the contest, placing fifth. Later that year, Carrasquillo won Rogue Invitational featuring the largest prize pool in the history of strongwoman and North America's Strongest Woman competition.

In 2025, Carrasquillo won the Arnold Strongwoman Classic, with some analysts arguing that her win secured her spot as the best competitor in the sport. She then began working with her new coach, Niko Chaprales, and earned her second consecutive Rogue Invitational win later that year.

In 2026, Carrasquillo started her competition season at the Arnold Strongwoman Classic, where she placed second behind Olga Liashchuk. She then placed second at North America's Strongest Woman in july. In september, Carrasquillo won her first America's Strongest Woman title and improved her log lift world record with a lift of 147.05 kg (324.2 lb). In october, she competed at the Rogue Invitational, placing second.

== Personal life ==
Carrasquillo is a single mother of a son. She struggled financially throughout her twenties, briefly becoming homeless and living in her car. She cited lifting as a source of stability during especially difficult times. She is also autistic.

== Personal records ==
Strongwoman

- Deadlift – 275 kg (606 lb) (2024 Rogue Invitational)
- Elephant bar Deadlift – 277 kg (611 lb) (2025 Arnold Strongwoman Classic)
- Log lift – 147.05 kg (324.2 lb) (2026 America's Strongest Woman) (world record)
- Axle press – 113.5 kg (250 lb) (2024 Rogue Invitational)
- Dumbbell press – 88.5 kg (195 lb) (2026 Arnold Strongwoman Classic)
- Barbell push press (from stands) – 160 kg (353 lb) (2025 Arnold Strongwoman Classic) (world record)
- Squat (raw with wraps) – 183.5 kg (405 lb) x 15 reps (2026 The Animal Cage)
- Atlas Stone (for max) – 158.5 kg (349 lb) (2022 Arnold Amateur Strongwoman World Championship)

Powerlifting

- Squat (raw with wraps) – 275 kg (606 lb) (2020 USPA Power Surge Pro/Am IV)
- Bench press – 137.5 kg (303 lb) (2020 USPA Power Surge Pro/Am IV)
- Deadlift – 245 kg (540 lb) (2020 USPA Power Surge Pro/Am IV)
- Total – 657.5 kg (1,450 lb) (2020 USPA Power Surge Pro/Am IV)
