= Elephant bar =

Strength training barbell used for deadlift

The elephant bar is a barbell developed by Rogue Fitness which is specifically used for the strongman raw deadlift. It was first created in 2016 by Terry Todd, the director of the Arnold Strongman Classic. The bar is known for being 10 ft (3.05 m) long and made from 200,000 psi tensile strength stainless steel, making it bend more than a power bar, and whip both up and down as well as forwards and backwards, while the deadlift is being performed.

== Elephant bar deadlift ==
Since its inception in 2016 Arnold Strongman Classic, the elephant bar deadlift has been featured 10 times at the Arnold Strongman Classic and the Rogue Invitational. The event uses specially designed Arnold Schwarzenegger inscribed 2-inch thick deep dish stainless steel weight plates which allow the bar height to remain at the standard 9 inches off the floor. The rules state that no deadlift suits are allowed hence the lift should be performed raw. (Note: However, the organizers of the event deviated from this rule in 2023 Arnold Strongman Classic, where they allowed the athletes to wear 'power briefs', hence the lifts from that year are not considered raw.) The event also allows only standard weightlifting straps and prohibits the use of figure 8 straps.

Throughout the years, it became one of the most internationally recognized deadlift events in strongman history.

== World record ==
- 474.5 kg (1,046 lb) (Raw with standard straps) by Hafþór Júlíus Björnsson (Iceland) (2019 Arnold Strongman Classic)

→ It is also the current all-time strongman raw world record irrespective of the bar
Note: In strongman, a raw deadlift is a lift performed without the use of any deadlift suit or power briefs.

=== Heaviest lifts in history ===
Only five men in history have deadlifted 1,000 lb (453.6 kg) or more raw on the elephant bar. Each instance is listed below.

Weight	Athlete	Event	Remarks	Ref.
474.5 kg (1,046 lb)	(Iceland) Hafþór Júlíus Björnsson	2019 ASC	World Record	
472 kg (1,041 lb)	(Iceland) Hafþór Júlíus Björnsson	2018 ASC	Former World Record	
467.5 kg (1,031 lb)	(United States) Jerry Pritchett	2017 ASC	Former World Record, performed outside the allocated 3 attempts	
465.5 kg (1,026 lb)	(Iceland) Hafþór Júlíus Björnsson	2025 ASC		
465.5 kg (1,026 lb)	(Iceland) Hafþór Júlíus Björnsson	2020 ASC		
465 kg (1,025 lb)	(United Kingdom) Eddie Hall	2016 ASC	Former World Record, done using figure-8 straps	
463 kg (1,021 lb)	(United States) Brian Shaw	2016 ASC		
463 kg (1,021 lb)	(Canada) Jean-François Caron	2018 ASC		
463 kg (1,021 lb)	(United States) Brian Shaw	2019 ASC		
461 kg (1,016 lb)	(United States) Brian Shaw	2018 ASC		
458.5 kg (1,011 lb)	(Iceland) Hafþór Júlíus Björnsson	2018 ASC		
456.5 kg (1,006 lb)	(Iceland) Hafþór Júlíus Björnsson	2024 ASC		
456 kg (1,005 lb)	(United States) Jerry Pritchett	2016 ASC		

=== World Record progression ===
Weight	Athlete	Event	Ref.
474.5 kg (1,046 lb)	(Iceland) Hafþór Júlíus Björnsson	2019 ASC	
472 kg (1,041 lb)	(Iceland) Hafþór Júlíus Björnsson	2018 ASC	
467.5 kg (1,031 lb)	(United States) Jerry Pritchett	2017 ASC	
465 kg (1,025 lb)	(United Kingdom) Eddie Hall	2016 ASC	

==== Women's world record progression ====
Weight	Athlete	Event	Ref.
318 kg (701 lb)	(United Kingdom) Lucy Underdown	2026 ASWC	
311 kg (686 lb)	(United Kingdom) Lucy Underdown	2026 ASWC	
309 kg (681 lb)	(United States) Jennifer Lyle	2026 ASWC	
306.5 kg (676 lb)	(United Kingdom) Lucy Underdown	2025 ASWC	
304.5 kg (671 lb)	(United Kingdom) Andrea Thompson	2025 ASWC	
302 kg (666 lb)	(United Kingdom) Lucy Underdown	2024 ASWC	
295.5 kg (651 lb)	(United States) Tamara Walcott	2023 ASWC	
295.5 kg (651 lb)	(United States) Victoria Long	2023 ASWC	
291 kg (642 lb)	(United States) Tamara Walcott	2022 ASWC	
281.5 kg (621 lb)	(United Kingdom) Andrea Thompson	2020 RRB	
279.5 kg (616 lb)	(United States) Kristin Rhodes	2020 RRB	

== See also ==
- Progression of the deadlift world record
