= Lucy Underdown =

British strongwoman

Personal information
- Nationality: English
- Born: 18 May 1990 (age 36) England
- Occupation: Strongman
- Height: 6 ft 0 in (1.83 m)
- Weight: 115 kg (254 lb)
Medal record
Strongman
Representing United Kingdom
World's Strongest Woman
| 4th | 2022 World's Strongest Woman |
| 2nd | 2023 World's Strongest Woman |
Arnold Pro Strongman World Series
| 2nd | 2024 Arnold Strongwoman Classic |
| 6th | 2025 Arnold Strongwoman Classic |
Rogue Invitational
| 3rd | 2024 Rogue Invitational |
Arnold Amateur Strongman World Series
| 7th | 2020 Arnold Amateur Strongwoman World Championships |
| 1st | 2024 Arnold UK |
Official Strongman Games
| 1st | 2023 OSG European Championship |
UK's Strongest Woman
| 3rd | 2021 UKSW |
| 3rd | 2022 UKSW |
Britain's Strongest Woman
| 2nd | 2023 BSW |
| 1st | 2024 BSW |
| 1st | 2025 BSW |

Lucy Underdown (born 18 May 1990) is an English strongwoman competitor and a police woman from Kent.

One of the best female deadlifters in the world, she is the first (and currently the only) woman to deadlift 700 lb and holds both standard bar and elephant bar women's deadlift records in strongwoman with 325 kg (717 lb) and 318 kg (701 lb) respectively.

== Early life ==
Being inspired by her twin sister Amy, Underdown was drawn towards athletics at a young age. She competed in sprinting first and then moved to shot put and discus and became one of the best female throwers in the United Kingdom, ranking either first or second from age 12 into her 20s. After 17 years of competition, she quit in 2017.

== Strongman career ==
Underdown began competing in strongwoman in 2018, winning the local Brighton's Strongest Woman show. She later won Britain's Natural Strongest Woman, qualifying her for the 2020 Arnold Amateur Strongwoman World Championships, her first international competition where she placed seventh out of ten competitors.

Underdown entered pro circuit in 2021 at UK's Strongest Woman, placing third. She quickly emerged as one of the best deadlifters and in 2021, deadlifted 300 kg (661 lb). (Note: Eventhough, both Becca Swanson (in 2005) and Crystal Tate (in 2018), had already deadlifted 300 kg (661 lb) in sanctioned powerlifting competitions, Underdown is the first woman to achieve it under strongwoman sport and rules.) In 2023 at Official Strongman Games, Underdown became the first woman to deadlift 317.5 kg (700 lb). Later in 2023, she reached second place in the World's Strongest Woman competition, tying with first-place Rebecca Roberts on points but losing on a tiebreaker.

In 2024, she won 2024 Arnold UK and Britain's Strongest Woman. She also reached the podium at 2024 Rogue Invitational. At 2024 Arnold Strongwoman Classic, she set the world record in the elephant bar deadlift. In 2024 World Deadlift Championship, Underdown extended her own standard bar deadlift record with 325 kg (717 lb), breaking the strongwoman deadlift record for the third time.

In 2025, she also extended her own elephant bar deadlift record with 306.5 kg (676 lb) at the 2025 Arnold Strongwoman Classic, after briefly losing it to Andrea Thompson. However she ended up in sixth place in the full show. She also earned her second consecutive Britain's Strongest Woman title.

In 2026, she again extended her own elephant bar deadlift record with 318 kg (701 lb) at the 2026 Arnold Strongwoman Classic, after briefly losing it to Jennifer Lyle.

== Personal life ==
Underdown is married to Jonathan Kelly, a strongman competitor from Ireland. She has anxiety and has expressed frustration at the harassment strongwomen receive on social media.

== Personal records ==
- Deadlift – 325 kg (717 lb) (2024 Women's World Deadlift Championships) (world record)
- Elephant bar Deadlift – 318 kg (701 lb) (2026 Arnold Strongwoman Classic) (world record)
- Deadlift (for reps) – 227 kg (500 lb) × 12 reps (2024 Arnold UK - Strongwoman) (world record), and 200 kg (441 lb) × 18 reps (2022 Ultimate Strongman women's championship) (world record)
- Log lift – 105 kg (231 lb) (2021 UK's Strongest Woman)
