= Heini Koivuniemi =

Finnish strongwoman competitor (born 1973)

- Born: Heini Koivuniemi; June 6, 1973 (age 53); Finland
- Occupation: Strongwoman
- Title: Europe's Strongest Woman; Finland's Strongest Woman

Competition record

Strongman

Representing Finland

World's Strongest Woman
2nd	2001 World's Strongest Woman
3rd	2002 World's Strongest Woman
3rd	2003 World's Strongest Woman
5th	2005 World's Strongest Woman
8th	2006 World's Strongest Woman

Europe's Strongest Woman
2nd	1998
1st	2002
2nd	2003
3rd	2004
4th	2005

Finland's Strongest Woman
1st	2001
1st	2003

IFSA China Grand Prix
1st	2002

Callender Grand Prix
2nd	2001

Killin Fair Championships
2nd	2001

Women's Figure competition

Representing Finland

Ms. Galaxy Europe
1st	1999 Ms. Galaxy Europe

Heini Koivumieni (born 1973) is a Finnish strongwoman competitor who has achieved numerous podium finishes at the World's Strongest Woman contest.

Koivuniemi competed five times in the World's Strongest Woman contests, finishing 2nd in 2001, and third in 2002 and 2003. Koivuniemi has also won Europe's Strongest Woman in 2002, and Finland's Strongest Woman in 2001 and 2003.

Heini was featured in a BBC documentary film entitled "Strongwomen" in 2002. The film documented the training leading up to the 2002 World's Strongest Woman contest, as well as a behind-the-scenes look at the actual contest itself. The film also featured American Jill Mills and 2 British competitors including 2002 runner-up Abbey Haigh from Scotland.

Koivuniemi holds a Guinness world record for throwing a beer keg for height, she threw a 12.3 kilograms (27 lb) beer keg over a bar at a height of 3.46 meters (11 ft 4.2in).

Heini also won the 1999 Ms. Galaxy Europe contest in Kokkola, Finland on May 20, 1999. The contest consisted of an obstacle course, and a figure/posing routine.
