= Wohlford =

Wohlford is both a given name and surname. Notable people with the name include:

- Jim Wohlford (born 1951), American former baseball player
- Josephine Blatt (also known as Josephine Wohlford; 1869–1923), American wrestler and powerlifter
- Sir Sven Wohlford Hansen (1876–1958), Welsh shipbuilder
