= Nina Geria =

Ukrainian strength athlete

- Born: 29 November 1990 (age 35); Kiev, Ukrainian SSR, USSR
- Occupation: Strongwoman
- Height: 1.84 m (6 ft 1/2 in)

Nina Geria (Ukrainian: Ні́на Геря) is a Ukrainian strength athlete who is foremost known as the winner of the World's Strongest Lady competition held in 2011.

== Career ==
Geria began her shot put training in 2003 and by April 2007, she started to train with the tug of war trainer Mikhail Demyanovich Geraskevich. She became an international tug of war competitor and a member of the Ukrainian national team that participated in several tournaments.

Geria started training for strongwoman competition by September 2009 with her coach Geraskevich and on 30 May 2010, she set her first world record in stone put with a 120 kg lifting stone. Geria has been a regular competitor at strongwoman and Highland games events as well as tug of war tournaments and has various international and national level records.
