= Kara Mann =

American strongwoman

Kara Mann (born June 28, 1983, Concord, Massachusetts) is a well known strongwoman competition athlete. She is one of a small number of known female athletes to compete in her sport. Kara stands 5'6" (66 inches, 168 cm) tall and weighs about 165 pounds (75 kg).

== Childhood ==
Mann was raised in Boston. She had a normal childhood, and she was the typical teenage girl who enjoyed using make-up and dating guys after school. Her parents were quite surprised when she let them know she was beginning a weightlifting training program while still in high school.

== Education ==
She graduated from Vanderbilt University on May 6, 2006, with a bachelor's degree in chemical engineering.

== Strongman career ==
After graduation from high school, Mann participated in the Massachusetts state championships, held in August 2002, where she finished in third place. Mann enrolled at the Vanderbilt University to study chemical engineering. She relocated to Nashville, Tennessee. Her second competition took place in St. Louis, Missouri, in September 2002, where she debuted at the North American Strongman championship, placing in seventh place.

In February 2003, Kara Mann participated at the X-treme Strongman Showdown in Wilmington, Massachusetts, once again, placing third. She won her first professional strongman championship in July that year, winning the Massachusetts state title, in the competition held at Revere that year. Her main dream as a strongman competitor remained to become the North American Strongman champion, and, one month after winning the Massachusetts title, she had her second chance at winning the coveted North American championship but she ended up in fifth place at the national tournament held in Columbus, Ohio, in August. Six months later, in February 2004, Mann returned to the X-Treme Strongman Showdown, improving her previous performance and landing in second place. She was able to push 200 pounds over 200 feet in 37 seconds that time, propelling her to almost taking the championship. Then in June that year, she traveled across the country to participate in a strongman competition on the United States' west coast for the first time. Mann placed fifth in the Cal Pro/Am tournament in Riverside, California, where she finished in fifth place. Mann was invited to participate in Strongman's team USA, and she represented her nation at the July 2004 All Nations Strength & Fitness competition, held in Aruba. Once again, she finished in second place.

In August 2004, she went for the North American Strongman championship for the third time, this time in Kansas City, Missouri. She finally made her dream come true and became national Strongman champion during that competition.

In addition to her competition feats, she has also pulled an A-4 military airplane 47 feet in 60 seconds.

Kara's story has been showcased on such television networks as ESPN and NBC.
