= Lidiia Hunko =

Ukrainian bobsledder

Personal information
- Nationality: Ukrainian
- Born: August 10, 1993 (age 32) Ivano-Frankivsk, Ukraine
- Height: 1.70 m (5 ft 7 in)
- Weight: 81–84 kg (179–185 lb)

Sport
- Sport: Bobsleigh
- Event(s): Monobob, two-woman
- Coached by: Mykhailo Heraskevych

Lidiia Hunko (Ukrainian: Гунько Лідія Олександрівна; born August 10, 1993, in Ivano-Frankivsk, Ukraine) is a Ukrainian bobsledder and strongwoman.

She is the first Ukrainian female bobsledder who received a quota place for the Winter Olympics.

== Career ==
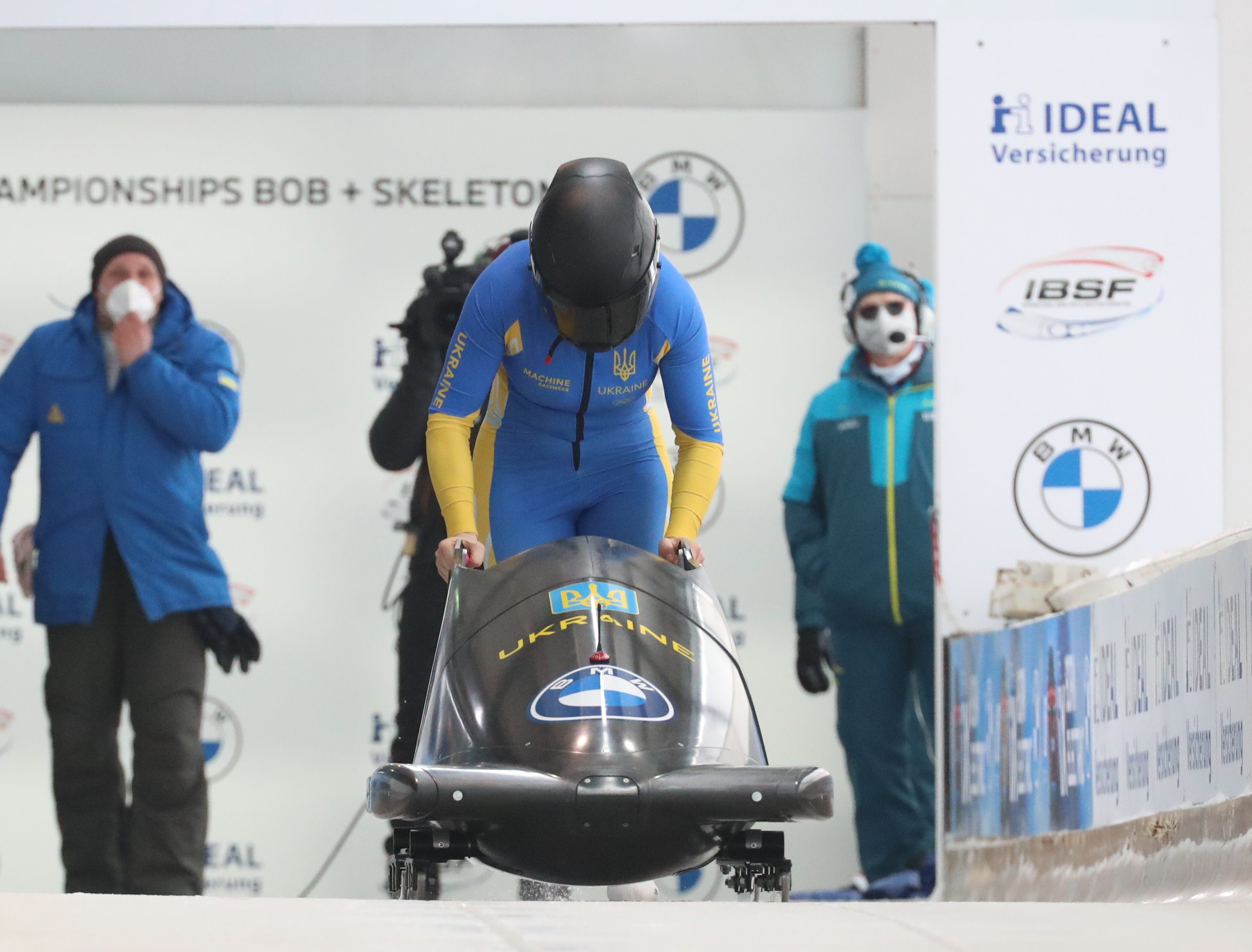
Hunko starts in the 1st run at the 2021 World Championships

Hunko started her sporting career as a strongwomen. In her very first appearance at World's Strongest Woman competition in 2014, she emerged runner-up. By 2016, she became a World Champion in deadlift and together with her friend World's Strongest Woman Olga Liashchuk, broke the double Deadlift women's world record with 410 kg (904 lb). In 2016 World's Strongest Woman, she again emerged runner-up.

The following year, she emerge runner-up again in 2017 Arnold Amateur Strongwoman World Championships and placed third in 2017 Strongest Woman in the World competition. After emerging sixth at 2018 Arnold Pro Strongwoman she retired from strongwoman competitions.

Hunko took up bobsleigh in 2018, and one year later started to compete internationally. Her first international start took place on November 20, 2019, in Lillehammer, Norway.

On December 20, 2020, she won together with Iryna Lishchynska a bronze medal at the European Cup stage in Sigulda which became the first-ever medal in the history of Ukrainian bobsleigh. They repeated their success on November 27, 2021, when they again won a bronze medal at the European Cup stage in Altenberg.

On January 14, 2022, Hunko was third in a World Monobob Series event in Winterberg. This result guaranteed her an Olympic spot. She became therefore the first Ukrainian female bobsledder to represent Ukraine at the Winter Games. She also ranked second together with Lishchynska in final two-women European Cup rating.

Hunko participated in the monobob event at the Winter Games in Beijing, however, after the competition, she failed a doping test and was suspended.

== Career results ==
=== Winter Olympics ===
Year	Place	Monobob	Two-women
2022	Beijing, China		—

=== World championships ===
Year	Place	Monobob	Two-women
2021	Altenberg, Germany	21	—

=== Women's Monobob World Series ===
==== Rankings ====
Season	Rank	Points
2020–21	35	136
2021–22	31	466

==== Podiums ====
Season	Place	Rank
2021–22	Winterberg, Germany	3

=== European Cup ===
==== Podiums in two-woman events ====
Season	Place	Rank
2020–21	Sigulda, Latvia	3
2021–22	Altenberg, Germany	3
