= Charmion =

American trapeze artist, strongwoman (1875–1949)

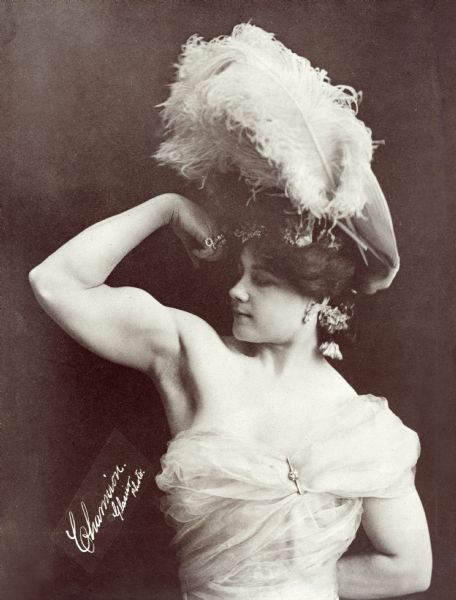
- Promotional photograph of Charmion, c. 1897
- Born: Laverie Vallee; July 17, 1875; Sacramento, California, U.S.
- Died: February 16, 1949 (aged 73); Santa Ana, California, U.S.

Laverie Vallee (née Cooper; July 18, 1875 – February 6, 1949), best known by her stage name Charmion, was an American vaudeville trapeze artist and strongwoman. One of her risqué trapeze acts was captured on film in 1901 by Thomas Edison.

== Career ==
According to the Journal of Sport History article "Flying, Flirting, and Flexing: Charmion's Trapeze Act, Sexuality, and Physical Culture at the Turn of the Twentieth Century", she made her debut on December 25, 1897, at Koster and Bial's vaudeville theatre in New York City, although The Sacramento Union lists her performing in Clunie Opera House on Feb 2 of that year.

A native of Sacramento, Charmion built her act around a memorable routine which opened with her on-stage entrance dressed in full Victorian street attire. She subsequently mounted the trapeze and disrobed down to her acrobat leotards in the midst of the trapeze's swinging motion. She appears to have begun performing while in her late teens, and this was part of her repertoire at least as early as May 1, 1898, and possibly before 1896, when her act was seen by critic George Jean Nathan while he was a boy.

Trapeze Disrobing Act

Charmion performed a version of this then-risqué striptease for an Edison short film, Trapeze Disrobing Act, on November 11, 1901. Two men are pictured in the film as an on-screen audience, applauding Charmion, and catching her clothes. This was deemed necessary so that the men in the actual audience would have a visual cue to enjoy the performance, instead of reacting with disgust, as polite society then demanded.

== Death ==
Vallee died in Santa Ana, California, at the age of 73.
