= Rebecca Roberts (strongwoman) =

Welsh strongwoman and grip athlete

Personal information
- Born: 18 December 1994 (age 31)
- Occupation: Strongwoman
- Height: 6 ft 3 in (1.91 m)
- Weight: 130–180 kg (287–397 lb)

Sport
- Partner: Paul Savage (Deceased 2022)
Medal record
Strongman
Representing Wales
World's Strongest Woman
7th	2019 World's Strongest Woman
1st	2021 World's Strongest Woman
8th	2022 World's Strongest Woman
1st	2023 World's Strongest Woman
1st	2024 World's Strongest Woman
Arnold Strongwoman Classic
2nd	2023 Arnold Strongwoman Classic
6th	2024 Arnold Strongwoman Classic
5th	2025 Arnold Strongwoman Classic
Rogue Invitational (Women)
6th	2024 Rogue Invitational (Women)
OSG European Championships
1st	2020 OSG European Championships
2nd	2023 OSG European Championships
1st	2024 OSG European Championships
UK's Strongest Woman
1st	2016 UK's Strongest Woman
2nd	2021 UK's Strongest Woman
1st	2022 UK's Strongest Woman
1st	2023 UK's Strongest Woman
1st	2024 UK's Strongest Woman
Britain's Strongest Woman
6th	2019 Britain's Strongest Woman
2nd	2021 Britain's Strongest Woman
1st	2023 Britain's Strongest Woman
2nd	2024 Britain's Strongest Woman
Wales's Strongest Woman
1st	2019 Wales's Strongest Woman
1st	2021 Wales's Strongest Woman
1st	2022 Wales's Strongest Woman
1st	2023 Wales's Strongest Woman
1st	2025 Wales Strongest Woman

Rebecca Roberts (born 18 December 1994), is a Welsh strongwoman and grip athlete.

She is the reigning UK's Strongest Woman and the winner of 2021, 2023 and 2024 World's Strongest Woman competition. She is one of only six women in history to become a multiple World's Strongest Woman champion.

== Early life ==
Roberts grew up in Bangor, Gwynedd, in North Wales. She lost her mother at a young age and her father suffered from dementia. She attended University of Liverpool where she studied forensic psychology and through university clubs discovered rugby.

== Career ==
Roberts was introduced to strength sports by her partner Paul Savage in 2016. Standing at 6 ft 3 in, and weighing in at 180 kg (397 lb), she was a formidable competitor. She was also participating in grip competitions, winning 2017 European Grip Championships in Norway, WHEA World Championships from 2017 to 2018 in Finland and 2019 British Grip Championships in Stafford. Since then, Roberts has competed in numerous strongwoman competitions and also holds several world records. Between 2019 and 2021, Rebecca lost around 50 kg (110 lb) of bodyweight to improve her stamina and athleticism.

She has also won the World's Strongest Natural Woman contest twice, World Grip Championships twice and European Grip Championships.

== Personal life ==
In 2022, Roberts' partner and coach Paul Savage suddenly passed away. She continues to compete in his honour. She is an advocate for body positivity and mental health, partially due to her own experience of bullying due to her weight and size earlier in her career. Roberts works full time but still trains roughly 20 hours a week to be able to compete at an international level. She is very active on social media, posting about her training, competitions and her weight loss journey, as well as the challenges of training while grieving.

== Personal records ==
- Deadlift – 280 kg (617 lb) equipped
- Rogue Elephant Bar Deadlift – 277 kg (611 lb) raw with straps
- Log press – 109 kg (240 lb) x 2 reps
- Axle press – 115.8 kg (255 lb)
- Dumbbell press – 69.9 kg (154 lb)
- Behind-the-neck jerk – 125 kg (276 lb)
- Atlas stones – 5 stones from 90.5–147.5 kg (200–325 lb) in 28.04 seconds
- Natural stones – 4 stones from 85–145 kg (187–320 lb) in 23.91 seconds

World Records (Active records are in bold text)
Year	Record	Sport	Federation	Performance
2023	**Conan's Wheel of Pain**	Strongwoman	Arnold Classic	92 ft 9 in
2022	Thor's Hammer	Strongwoman	Rogue	39 seconds
2018	**Handshake Lift (one hand)**	Grip	David Horne World of Grip	84.68 kg
2018	**Axle Deadlift (20" from the floor) double overhand grip**	Grip	David Horne World of Grip	137.05 kg
2018	**76mm Silarukov Rolling Handle (thumbless) hold**	Grip	David Horne World of Grip	47.5 kg
2018	IronMind Little Big Horn	Grip	IronMind	70.96 kg
2018	Log Lift Max	Strongwoman	WHEA	90 kg
2018	Deadlift Max	Strongwoman	WHEA	227.5 kg
2017	**2.5" Crusher**	Grip	FBBC	67 kg
2017	**3" Trilobite**	Grip	Mammoth Grip Tools	43.1 seconds
2017	**IronMind Block**	Grip	IronMind	31.55 kg
