= Marie Sirois =

French-Canadian Strongwoman (1865–1920)

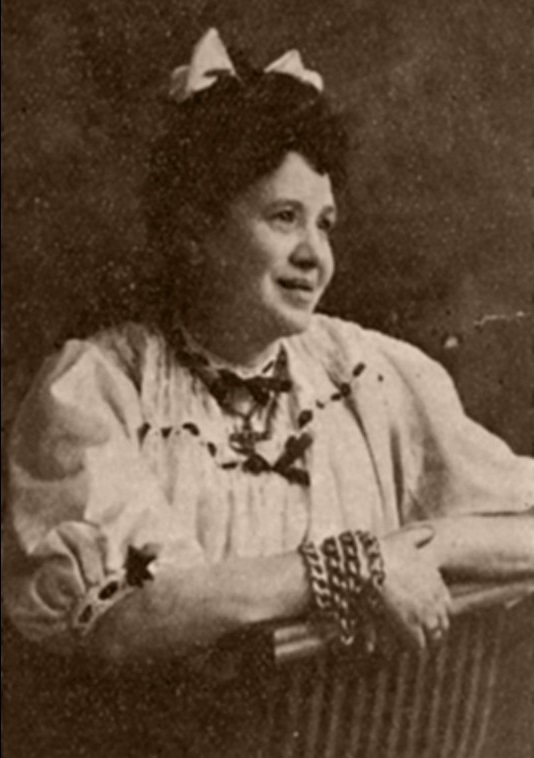
- Born: 1865; Ste-Anne-de-la-Pocatière, Canada East
- Died: January 20, 1920 (aged 54–55)
- Citizenship: Canadian
- Occupation: The Strongest Woman of the World
- Known for: Strongwoman

Marie Sirois (Septembre 2, 1865 – January 18, 1920), erroneously known as Marie-Louise, was a French-Canadian strongwoman who was promoted as the strongest woman in the world.

By age 17, she was noted for having lifted barrels weighing 115 kilograms (254 pounds).

After her family moved to Salem, Massachusetts, she married fellow Quebec strongman Henri Cloutier and performed at his gym in Salem. She became a professional athlete at age 25 and became known for lifting a 1,300 kilograms (2,900 pounds) platform on her back and also restraining a pair of 635 kilograms (1,400 pounds) horses in a similar manner as done by Louis Cyr.

Her performance continued even in her later years, such as the 1917 inauguration (when she was 50 years old) of the Montreal monument to George-Étienne Cartier where she lifted alongside strongman Arthur Dandurand.

After her death in 1920, she was buried in her husband's hometown of Roxton Pond, Quebec. Her tombstone describes her as "la femme plus forte du monde".
