= World's Strongest Woman =

Annual strongwoman contest

- Founded: 1997; 29 years ago
- Country: United States
- Most recent champion: Andrea Thompson (2025)
- Tournament format: Multi-event competition

World's Strongest Woman is an annual strongwoman contest. It has been known at various times as the Strongwoman World Championships, World's Strongest Lady, and United Strongmen Women's World Championships.

== History ==
The inaugural event was held in 1997 and was not held for another three consecutive years. From 2001 to 2003, the event was held at the same time and place as World's Strongest Man. After the withdrawal of sponsors TWI and BBC, the International Federation of Strength Athletes replaced it with the Strongwoman World Championships from 2005 to 2008. The contest returned as the World's Strongest Lady in 2011, and from 2012 to 2014 as the United Strongmen Women's World Championships, before reverting back to its original name in 2016. From 2019 to 2022 the competition was held in Daytona Beach, United States by Official Strongman Games. The 2023 competition was held in Charleston, West Virginia, 2024 edition in Madison, Wisconsin and 2025 edition in Arlington, Texas.

=== 2025 controversy ===
In 2025, transgender athlete Jammie Booker initially won the event and was presented with the trophy. Two days after the event, she was disqualified due to being "biologically male". Andrea Thompson, who had finished second, was declared the winner.

== Results ==
Year	Champion	Runner-up	3rd place	Venue
1997	(Denmark) Michelle Sorensen	(United Kingdom) Joanne Barter	(Norway) Anna Stikkelstad	Copenhagen, Denmark
1998-2000	Event not held			
2001	(United States) Jill Mills	(Finland) Heini Koivuniemi	(United States) Robin Coleman	Victoria Falls, Zambia
2002	(United States) Jill Mills	(United Kingdom) Jackie Young	(Finland) Heini Koivuniemi	Kuala Lumpur, Malaysia
2003	(Poland) Aneta Florczyk	(Sweden) Anna Rosén	(Finland) Heini Koivuniemi	Victoria Falls, Zambia
2004	Event not held			
2005	(Poland) Aneta Florczyk	(United Kingdom) Gemma Taylor-Magnusson	(United States) Jill Mills	(United Kingdom) Glenarm, Northern Ireland
2006	(Poland) Aneta Florczyk	(Sweden) Anna Rosén	(Sweden) Anki Oberg	Opalenica, Poland
2007	Event not held			
2008	(Poland) Aneta Florczyk	(United States) Kristin Rhodes	(Finland) Kati Luoto	Tczew, Poland
2009-2010	Event not held			
2011	(Ukraine) Nina Geria	(United Kingdom) Gemma Taylor-Magnusson	(Germany) Annett von der Weppen	Poltava, Ukraine
2012	(United States) Kristin Rhodes	(Finland) Niina Jumppanen	(Sweden) Anna Rosén	Hämeenlinna, Finland
2013	(Finland) Kati Luoto	(United States) Kristin Rhodes	(Finland) Anniina Vaaranmaa	Helsinki, Finland
2014	(Ukraine) Olga Liashchuk	(Ukraine) Lidiia Hunko	(United States) Jenn Tibbenham	Pyhtää, Finland
2015	Event not held			
2016	(United Kingdom) Donna Moore	(Ukraine) Lidiia Hunko	(Ukraine) Olga Liashchuk	(United Kingdom) Doncaster, England
2017	(United Kingdom) Donna Moore	(United States) Kristin Rhodes	(United States) Britteny Cornelius	(United States) Raleigh, USA
2018	(United Kingdom) Andrea Thompson	(United States) Kristin Rhodes	(United Kingdom) Donna Moore	(United States) Raleigh, USA
2019	(United Kingdom) Donna Moore	(United States) Victoria Long	(United Kingdom) Andrea Thompson	(United States) Daytona Beach, USA
2020	Event not held			
2021	(United Kingdom) Rebecca Roberts	(Ukraine) Olga Liashchuk	(United Kingdom) Annabelle Chapman	(United States) Daytona Beach, USA
2022	(Ukraine) Olga Liashchuk	(United Kingdom) Andrea Thompson	(Puerto Rico) Inez Carrasquillo	(United States) Daytona Beach, USA
2023	(United Kingdom) Rebecca Roberts	(United Kingdom) Lucy Underdown	(Australia) Nicole Genrich	(United States) Charleston, USA
2024	(United Kingdom) Rebecca Roberts	(Canada) Jackie Osczevski	(United States) Jennifer Lyle	(United States) Madison, USA
2025 (Note: Transgender athlete Jammie Booker was initially the competition winner before being disqualified due to her being "biologically male" per the competition's rules.)	(United Kingdom) Andrea Thompson	(Australia) Allira-Joy Cowley	(Canada) Jackie Osczevski	(United States) Arlington, USA

=== Repeat champions ===
Champion	Times
(Poland) Aneta Florczyk	4
(United Kingdom) Donna Moore	3
(United Kingdom) Rebecca Roberts	3
(United States) Jill Mills	2
(Ukraine) Olga Liashchuk	2
(United Kingdom) Andrea Thompson	2

=== Championships by country ===
Nationality	Gold (1st)	Silver (2nd)	Bronze (3rd)	Total
United Kingdom	8	6	3	17
Poland	4	0	0	4
United States	3	5	5	13
Ukraine	3	3	1	7
Finland	1	1	4	6
Denmark	1	0	0	1
Sweden	0	2	2	4
Canada	0	1	1	2
Australia	0	1	1	2
Norway	0	0	1	1
Germany	0	0	1	1
Puerto Rico	0	0	1	1

== See also ==
- America's Strongest Woman
- Arnold Strongwoman Classic
- North America's Strongest Woman
- Rogue Invitational
- World's Strongest Woman

== See also ==
- America's Strongest Woman
- Arnold Strongwoman Classic
- North America's Strongest Woman
- Rogue Invitational
