= Donna Moore (strongwoman) =

British strongwoman

Personal information
- Nationality: English
- Born: 1 May 1980 (age 46)
- Height: 170 cm (5 ft 7 in)
- Weight: 82–90 kg (181–198 lb; 12 st 13 lb – 14 st 2 lb)
Medal record
Strongman
Representing United Kingdom
World's Strongest Woman
7th	2013 World Strongwoman Championship
1st	2016 World's Strongest Woman
1st	2017 World's Strongest Woman
2nd	2018 World's Strongest Woman
1st	2019 World's Strongest Woman
Arnold Pro Strongwoman
1st	2018 Arnold Pro Strongwoman
2nd	2019 Arnold Pro Strongwoman
6th	2022 Arnold Pro Strongwoman
6th	2023 Arnold Strongwoman Classic
12th	2024 Arnold Strongwoman Classic
Rogue Invitational
10th	2024 Rogue Invitational
World's Ultimate Strongwoman
2nd	2021 World's Ultimate Strongwoman
Europe's Strongest Woman
1st	2015 Europe's Strongest Woman
2nd	2024 OSG European Championship
1st	2025 OSG European Championship
Australia's Strongest International
3rd	2022 Australia's Strongest International
UK's Strongest Woman
1st	2021 UK's Strongest Woman
2nd	2022 UK's Strongest Woman
Britain's Strongest Woman
4th	2023 Britain's Strongest Woman
3rd	2024 Britain's Strongest Woman
6th	2025 Britain's Strongest Woman

Donna Moore (born 1980) is a British strongwoman. The winner of the 2016, 2017, and 2019 World's Strongest Woman competitions, the 2015 Europe's Strongest Woman title, the 2016 and 2017 Arnold Amateur Strongwoman world championships, and 2018 Arnold Pro Strongwoman title, she's the second-most decorated professional strongwoman of all-time.

== Personal life ==
Moore is a single mother of two children, and is from Colburn, North Yorkshire, in England. She has been competing since 2012.

== Personal records ==
- Deadlift – 250 kg (551 lb) (2024 Damo's Push Pull Gym v Gym)
- Log lift – 115 kg (254 lb) (2021 UK's Strongest Woman)
- Dumbbell press – 81.5 kg (180 lb) (2020 Rogue Record Breakers) former world record
- Atlas Stone (for max) – 171 kg (377 lb) (2020 World's Ultimate Strongman, Feats of Strength series) former world record
- Atlas Stone without tacky (for max) – 147 kg (324 lb) (2018) World Record
- Ardblair Stones – 18–118 kg (40–260 lb) 7 of the 9 stones loaded in 37.14 seconds (2019 Blairgowrie and Rattray Highland Games) World Record
