= Robin Coleman =

American actress

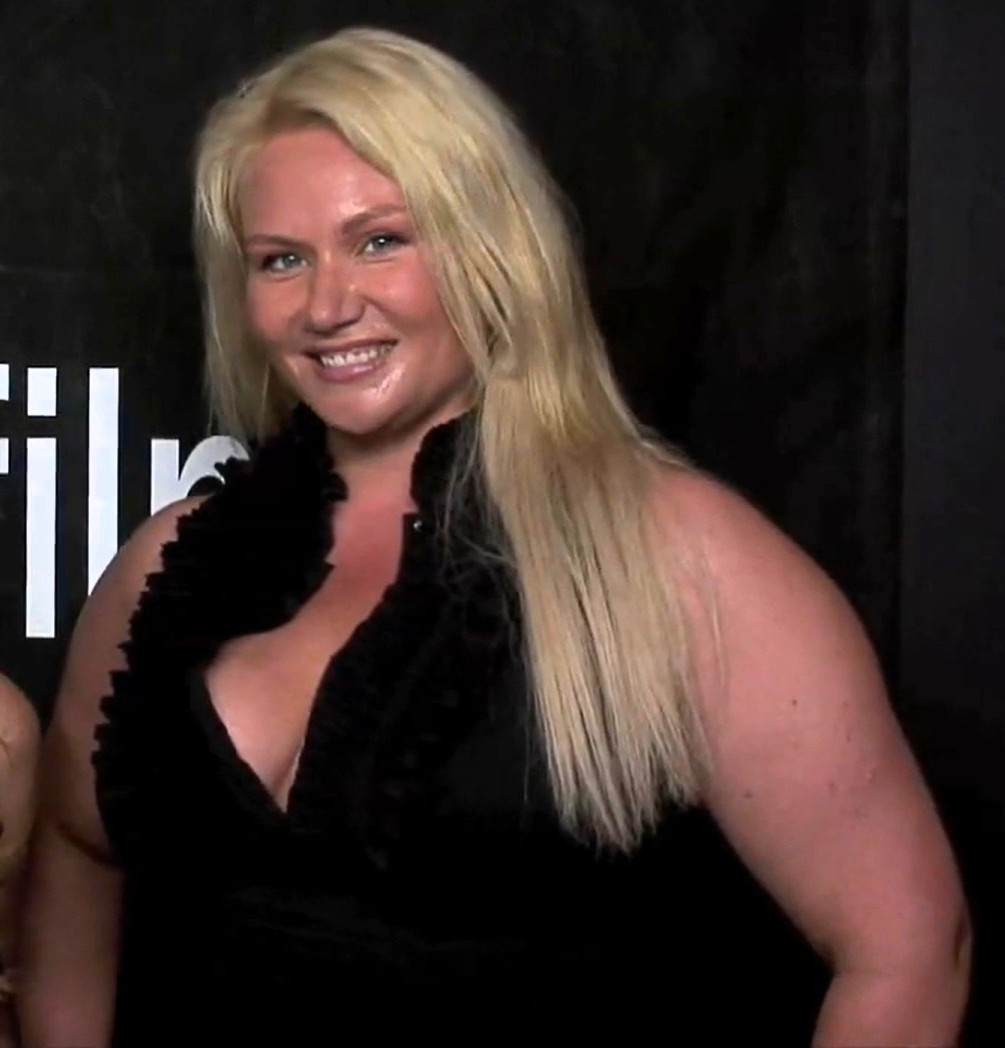
- Coleman in 2009
- Born: March 30, 1973 (age 53); Friendswood, Texas, U.S.
- Occupation: Actress
- Years active: 1997–present
- Height: 6 ft 1 in (185 cm)

Robin "Hellga" Coleman (born March 30, 1973) is an American actress with backgrounds in figure competition, rowing, professional strongwoman, and female bodybuilding.

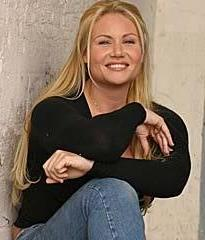
Coleman in 2007

Coleman was one of the stars of NBC's American Gladiators revival and one of the initial six women chosen for the show.

Her film debut was in 2009 in Tyler Perry's Madea Goes to Jail in the role of Big Sal. She has also worked on Days of Our lives, V.I.P., etc. She has made guest appearances on Last Call with Carson Daly, Tabatha's Salon Takeover, and Access Hollywood, as well as having performed as acting and stunt talent for video games.

Coleman is a Meisner Method and Groundlings (improvisational comedy) trained actress, and a member of SAG and AFTRA.

She competed in the inaugural World's Strongest Woman in Zambia in 2001, where she placed third. In 2006, she began competing in figure at the Tournament of Champions, held in Anaheim. In 1997, after 1½ years of serious training, she competed in her first bodybuilding competition, California's Border States, placing first in the novice and second in the open heavyweight division.

Coleman has also trained in boxing, mixed martial arts, and pro wrestling. She has trained with Tom Magee, a former World's Strongest Man competitor, Sammy "The Toy" Stewart, Ric "The Equalizer" Drasin, Gokor, and Robert Sherman, a former bodybuilder turned fitness guru.

Coleman is also a competitive rower, with affiliations with Lions Rowing Club and California Yacht Club, both in Marina del Rey. She rows in club 8s and 4s, and Quad, Double, and single sculls. Her single shell is named the 'Equanimity'.

== Filmography ==
- Days of Our Lives – Tanya
- Madea Goes to Jail – Big Sal
- American Gladiators 2008 – Hellga
- Attack of the Show – Hellga
- The Insider – Hellga
- Deal or No Deal – Hellga
- Ultimate Revenge – Featured
- V.I.P. – Polaris

== Television appearances ==
- "Gladiators Ready! The Gladiator Story" – Self/Hellga
- "Carson Daly" – Self
- "Access Hollywood" – Self
- "Reality Chat" - Self
- "Star Dates" – Self
- "World's Strongest Woman" – Self/Athlete
- "Tabitha's Salon Takeover" – Self
- "Pair of Kings" – Hilda

== Video game appearances ==
- Dead Rising 3 – voice of Jherii Gallo

== Contest history ==
- 1997 Border States Classic, 1st Novice, 2nd Open Heavyweight
- 2001 World's Strongest Woman, 3rd
- 2006 Tournament of Champions D class Figure, 11th
