= Josephine Blatt =

American vaudeville performer, strongwoman and professional wrestler (1869–1923)

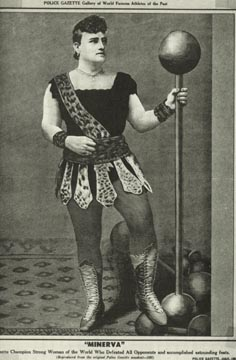
- Blatt in the Police Gazette
- Born: Josephine Schauer; 1869; New York City, US
- Died: September 1, 1923 (aged 54); New York City, US
- Other names: Minerva, Josie Wahlford
- Occupations: Strongwoman; Weightlifter; Professional wrestler
- Years active: 1887–1910
- Era: fin de siècle
- Known for: First women's champion, Solid gold loving cup
- Height: 6 ft 0 in (183 cm)
- Spouses: Christian Friedrich Wahlford; Charles Blatt; Henry Bercaw
- Children: 4

Josephine Schauer Blatt (1869 – September 1, 1923), best known by her stage name Minerva, was an American strongwoman. She married strongman Charles Blatt in 1888.

== Early life ==
Blatt was born in New York, the ninth child of German immigrants Joseph and Louisa Schauer. Her father immigrated in 1858 and her mother two years later.

Nineteenth-century accounts differ as to the place and time of her birth. In an interview in The Mirror of Manchester, New Hampshire, she claimed to have been born in 1865 in Hamburg, Germany. The Guinness Book of World Records listed her as an American, born in 1869, and various accounts place her either in Hoboken or Elizabethtown, New Jersey in her youth.

== World weightlifting record dispute ==
In the July 1937 issue of Strength & Health magazine, Rosetta Hoffman made the claim that Minerva had lifted 23 men and a platform, in a 3,564–lb hip-and-harness lift.

For several years, the Guinness Book of World Records listed Minerva as having lifted the greatest weight ever by a woman—3,564-lb in a hip-and-harness lift— "at the Bijou Theatre, Hoboken, N.J., on April 15, 1895."

Hoffman may be the source for Guinness record, even though it contradicts, and even enhances, the published claim of the time from the sponsor of the event, the National Police Gazette. The Gazette, a sensationalist tabloid of the period, claimed she lifted a platform with only 18 men weighing "approximately 3000 pounds".

For this feat, the Gazette awarded Minerva with a gold loving cup on April 29, 1895; this trophy is now lost.

In the 1890s she competed across Mexico.

== Wrestling career ==
Blatt has been called the first woman to win a wrestling championship in the US. She wrestled against both men and women. She lost the title of women's wrestling champion to challenger Alice Williams, who then lost it to Laura Bennett in 1901; Blatt challenged Bennett on several occasions but never regained the championship.

== Late life ==
Blatt retired from performance in 1910, and invested in New Jersey real estate. She died on September 1, 1923.

== Bibliography ==
- Laprade, Pat. Sisterhood of the Squared Circle: The History and Rise of Women’s Wrestling. 9781773050157. Toronto: ECW Press, 2017.
