= Kati Luoto =

Finnish strength athlete (born 1972)

Kati Louto
Personal information
- Nationality: Finnish
- Born: 12 August 1972 (age 53) Helsinki, Finland
- Occupation: Strongwoman
- Height: 1.72 m (5 ft 7 1/2 in)

Kati Luoto is a Finnish strength athlete who is foremost known as the winner of the 2013 World's Strongest Woman held in Helsinki and winning Finland's Strongest Woman competition seven times.

== Career ==
Luoto had been involved in various sports from an early age and after giving birth to her three children, she started to attend the gym to shape her body and began to train seriously in 1999. In 2003 and trained by the former strongman Harri Simonen, she participated in her first Finland's Strongest Woman contest where she was placed 2nd. As a strongwoman performer, she is particularly known for her log lift performance (110 kg in training).

== Competition record ==
- 2003 Finland's Strongest Woman - 2nd
- 2004 Finland's Strongest Woman - 1st
- 2005 Finland's Strongest Woman - 1st
- 2005 Europe's Strongest Woman - 5th
- 2005 World's Strongest Woman - 7th
- 2006 Finland's Strongest Woman - 1st
- 2006 World's Strongest Woman - 4th
- 2007 Finland's Strongest Woman - 1st
- 2007 Europe's Strongest Woman - 4th
- 2008 World's Strongest Woman - 3rd
- 2009 Real Power Games Strong Woman - 1st
- 2009 Finland's Strongest Woman - 2nd
- 2010 Global Powerlifting Alliance European Championship Raw Bench Press - 1st
- 2010 Finland's Strongest Woman - 1st
- 2011 Real Power Games Strong Woman - 1st
- 2011 Finland's Strongest Woman - 1st
- 2012 Global Powerlifting Alliance European Championship Raw Bench Press - 1st
- 2013 Scandinavia's Strongest Woman -1st
- 2013 Finland's Strongest Woman - 1st
- 2013 United Strongmen Women's World Championships - 1st
