= Jill Mills =

American powerlifter and strongwoman

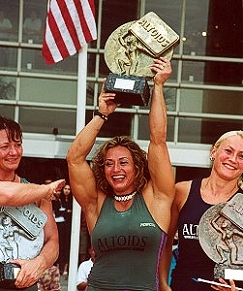
- Born: Jill Mills; March 2, 1972 (age 54); Indiana
- Occupations: Strongwoman, Powerlifting, Bodybuilding
- Employer: self employed Personal Trainer
- Known for: No Pain, No Gain 2004
- Height: 5 ft 4 in (163 cm)
- Title: 2x World's Strongest Woman
- Spouse: Milo Mills
- Children: 2
- Website: Official Site

Competition record

Strongman

Representing United States

World's Strongest Woman
1st	2001 World's Strongest Woman
1st	2002 World's Strongest Woman
3rd	2005 World's Strongest Woman

Strongest Woman Alive
1st	2004

Callender Grand Prix
1st	2001

Killin Fair Championships
1st	2001

NASS Metroplex Championships
1st	1998

York Barbell Championships
1st	2000

SW USA NASS Strongwomen Championships
1st	2001

NE Showdown Pro
1st	2002

St Louis Pro
1st	2002

Powerlifting

Representing United States

WPC World Powerlifting Championships
1st	2003	82kg

USPF National Championships
1st	1997	82kg

USPF Texas Powerlifting Championships
1st	1997	82kg
1st	1998	82kg
1st	1999	82kg
1st	2001	82kg

APF National Powerlifting Championships
1st	2003	82kg

APF Raw Texas Powerlifting Championships
1st	1998	82kg
1st	1999	82kg
1st	2003	75kg

Jill Mills (born March 2, 1972) is an American world champion powerlifter and world champion strongwoman. She won the inaugural World's Strongest Woman competition and was the first competitor to win the competition twice.

== Powerlifting contest results ==
- 1995 USMC
- 1996 Alamo Classic, 165 lb. division - 1st
- 1997 USPF National Powerlifting Championship, Philadelphia, PA - 1st
- 1997 USPF Texas State Powerlifting Championship, Austin, Ft Hood, TX - 1st
- 1998 USPF Texas State Powerlifting Championship, Austin, Ft Hood, TX - 1st
- 1998 APF Raw State Championships, 181 lb. class - 1st
- 1998 Alamo Classic, 181 lb. class - 1st
- 1998 Metroplex Rep contest
- 1999 USPF Texas State Powerlifting Championship, Austin, Ft Hood, TX - 1st
- 1999 APF Raw State Powerlifting Championship, Dallas, TX (set 4 new state records) - 1st
- 1999 IPA Westside Invitational, Cleveland, OH, 181 lb. class - 1st
- 2001 USPF Texas State Powerlifting Championship, Austin, Ft Hood, TX - 1st
- 2001 USPF Texas Cup - guest lifter, 181 lb division (set 4 new state records and 1 new national record)
- 2003 APF Texas State Championship, Austin, TX - 165 lb class and overall best lifter, 4 new state records
- 2003 APF Nationals, Los Angeles, CA - 181 lb class champion

== Strongwoman contest results ==
- 1997 Lonestar Strength Festival, Euless TX (injured)
- 1998 NASS Metroplex Champ, Dallas, TX
- 2000 York Barbell Champ, York, PA
- 2001 SW USA NASS Strongwoman Champ
- 2001 Callander Roundtable Champ (World's Strongest Woman qualifier)
- 2001 Killin Fair Champ
- 2001 IFSA World's Strongest Woman champion, Zambia, Africa
- 2002 Northeast Showdown Pro Strongwoman, Boston - won all events
- 2002 St. Louis Microbrew festival Pro Strongwoman - won all events
- 2002 Clash of the Titan, Aberdeen Scotland - 1st overall
- 2002 IFSA World's Strongest Woman champion, Kuala Lumpur, Malaysia
- 2004 Strongest Woman Alive champion, Riverside, CA

World's Strongest Woman
Preceded by: None	First (2001)	Succeeded by: Herself
Preceded by: Herself	First (2002)	Succeeded by: Herself
