= Strongwoman =

Female performer of feats of strength

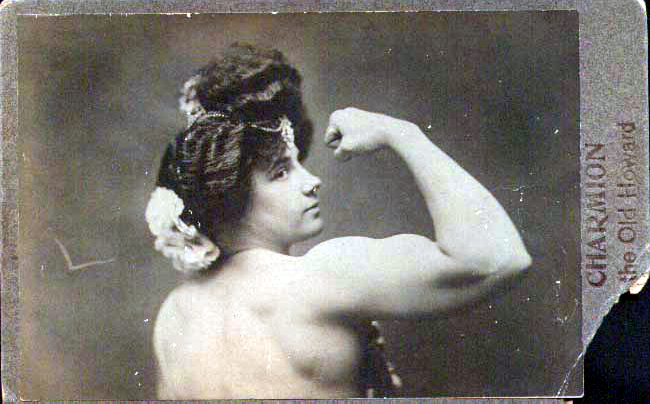
Charmion (1875–1949), vaudeville strongwoman and trapeze artist

A strongwoman is a woman who performs feats of strength in a show or circus, or a woman who competes in strength athletics. Traditionally, strongwomen have had a special appeal, as women involved in demonstrated feats of strength were exceptions. Modern day strongwoman competitions test athletes' physical strength and endurance through a variety of heavy lifts and events.

== Traditional strongwomen ==
Traditionally, strongwomen were featured as performers in a circus, or in vaudeville, music halls, or other venues, and engaged in feats of strength such as barbell lifting and human juggling.

Some famous traditional strongwomen include:

- Miss Athléta (Athleta Van Huffelen) – Belgium (1865–1927)
- Marie Sirois – Quebec, Canada (1865–1920)
- Minerva (Josephine Blatt née Wohlford) – New Jersey, US (1869–1923)
- Vulcana (Miriam Kate Williams aka Kate Roberts) – Abergavenny, Wales (1874–1946)
- Miss Apollina (Elise Gillaine Herbigneaux) – Belgium (1874 – Unknown)
- Charmion (Laverie Vallee née Cooper) – California, US (1875–1949)
- Macarte Sisters – Great Britain Julia (1878–1958), Adelaide (1879–1908) and Cecilia (1881–1939)
- Marina Lurs (Maria Loorberg) – Estonia (1881–1922)
- Anette Busch – Estonia (1882–1969)
- Katie Sandwina – Vienna, Austria (1884–1952)
- Marie Ford – New York, US (1900 – Unknown)
- Ivy Russell – Croydon, England (1907 – Unknown)
- Luisita Leers (Martha Luise Krökel) – Germany (1909–1997)
- Mildred Burke – Coffeyville, Kansas, US (1915–1989)
- Abbye "Pudgy" Stockton – Santa Monica, California, US (1917–2006)
- Joan Rhodes – London, England (1920–2010)
- Reba Rakshit – Kolkata, India (1933–2010)
- Jan Todd – Pennsylvania, US (born 1952)
- Bev Francis – Australia (born 1955)
- Charmaine Childs (aka Betty Brawn) – Australia (born 1965)
- Becca Swanson – Papillion, Nebraska, US (born 1973)

== Modern-day strongwomen ==
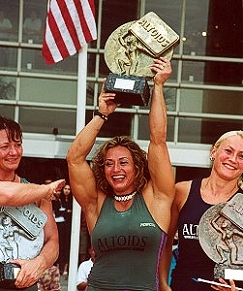
Jill Mills, World's Strongest Woman 2002

In recent years, the term strongwoman has come to refer to the women who compete in events such as the annual World's Strongest Woman and Arnold Strongwoman Classic competitions. Strongwomen compete in the sport of Strongman and the sport has become popular with female strength athletes over the past decade that there are several state and nationally sanctioned competitions that prepare amateur female athletes for national competitions that allow for the opportunity to compete as professionals. In all these contests, the participants compete in similar types of events that can be found in a Strongman competition. Such events include, but are not limited to:

- Deadlift with various implements such as a barbell, axle, loaded frame, car, etc., all of varying weights
- Squat with varying weight, often the barbell or axle is loaded with wagon or truck wheels that are larger than standard weighted plates
- Atlas Stones or other natural stones
- Loading Medleys
- Overhead press using various implements such as an axle, circus dumbbell, log, keg, or block
- Vehicle pull
- Keg-tossing
- Sandbag to shoulder
- Conan's Wheel
- Farmer's walk
- Hercules hold
- Fingal's fingers
- Tire flip
- Power stairs

=== Notable modern strongwomen ===
- Aneta Florczyk
- Annika Eilmann
- Camilla Fogagnolo
- Heini Koivuniemi
- Inez Carrasquillo
- Jill Mills
- Kati Luoto
- Kristin Rhodes
- Lidiia Hunko
- Lucy Underdown
- Olga Liashchuk
- Rebecca Lorch
- Rebecca Roberts
- Robin Coleman
- Tamara Walcott

=== International Accolades ===
The table below summarizes the most decorated strongwomen in modern history with the most number of international wins in their careers (1st places only/ open weight and age categories only). Active Retired

#	Name	Country	Active	Competitions	Wins	Win %
1	Olga Liashchuk	Ukraine	2014–	23	9	39.13%
2	Donna Moore	(United Kingdom) UK / England	2012–	29	7	24.14%
3	Aneta Florczyk	Poland	2003–2008	8	6	75.00%
4	Inez Carrasquillo	Puerto Rico	2021–	15	5	33.33%
5	Victoria Long	(United States) USA	2019–2024	6	4	66.67%
6	Rebecca Roberts	(United Kingdom) UK / Wales	2017–	19	4	21.05%
7	Jill Mills	(United States) USA	2001–2005	3	2	66.67%
8	Anna Rosén	Sweden	2002–2012	8	2	25.00%
8	Jessica Fithen	(United States) USA	2018–2021	8	2	25.00%
8	Angelica Jardine	(United States) USA	2023–	8	2	25.00%
11	Kristin Rhodes	(United States) USA	2008–2018	9	2	22.22%
12	Lucy Underdown	(United Kingdom) UK / England	2020–	13	2	15.38%
13	Andrea Thompson	(United Kingdom) UK / England	2013–	28	2	7.14%

== Competitions ==
International Championships:

- World's Strongest Woman
- Arnold Strongwoman Classic
- Rogue Invitational
- Shaw Classic Women's Open
- World's Ultimate Strongwoman
- Extinct Games
- Ultimate Strongman Women's World Championship
- Natural World's Strongest Woman

Continental Championships:

- Europe's Strongest Woman
- North America's Strongest Woman
- Africa's Strongest Woman
- Pacific Strongest Woman

National Championships:

- Iceland's Strongest Woman
- America's Strongest Woman
- Britain's Strongest Woman
- Canada's Strongest Woman
- Finland's Strongest Woman
- Germany's Strongest Woman
- Russia's Strongest Woman
- Australia's Strongest Woman

== See also ==
- Female bodybuilding
- Power training
- Sthenolagnia
- Strength training
- Strongman
