= Aneta Florczyk =

Polish strength athlete (born 1982)

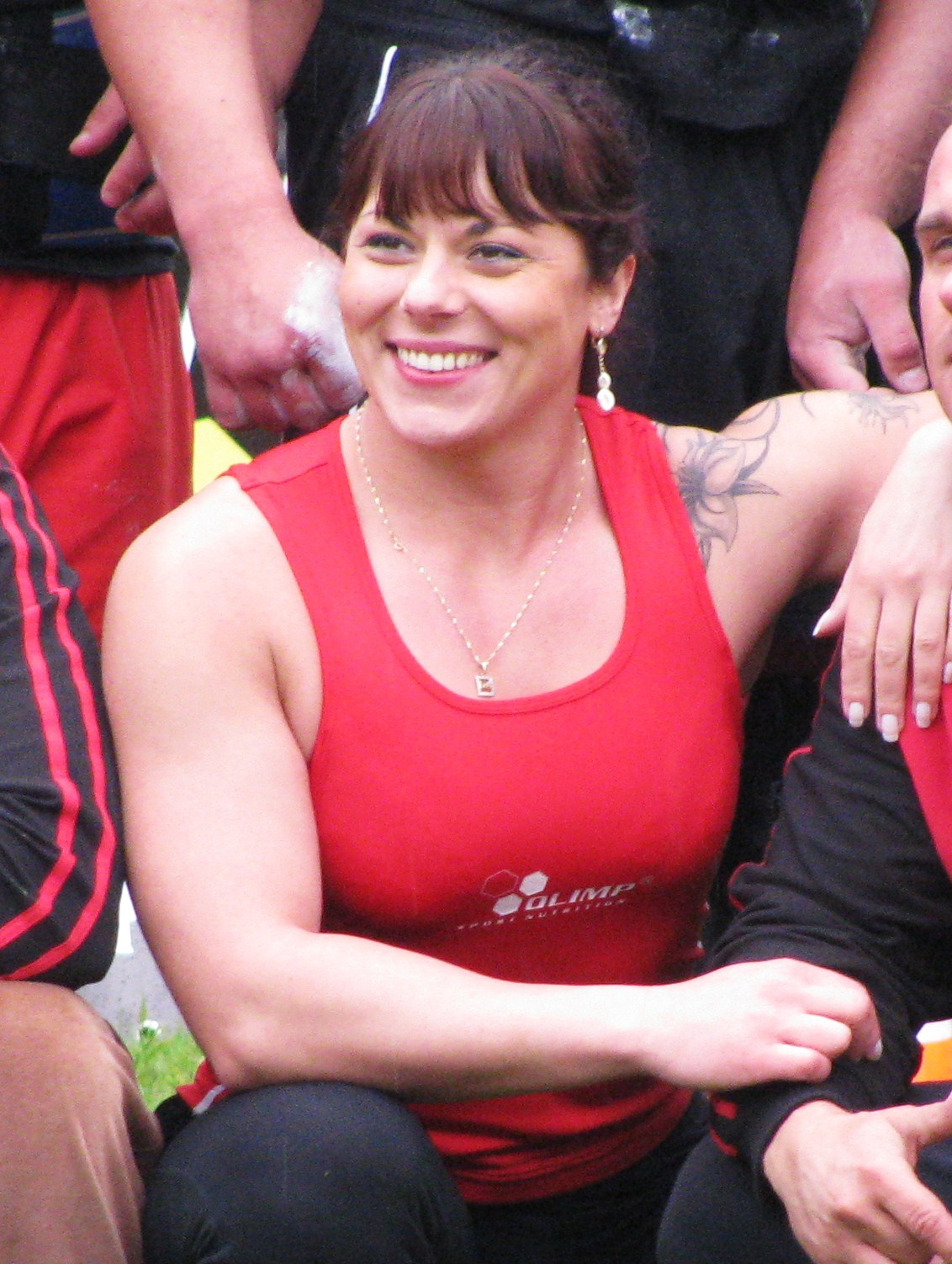
- Florczyk in 2009

Personal information
- Born: 26 February 1982 (age 43) Malbork, Poland
- Height: 1.68 m (5 ft 6 in)
- Weight: 75 kg (165 lb)

Sport
- Country: Poland

Aneta Florczyk (pseudonym Atena; born 26 February 1982) is a Polish strongwoman. She is the only 4 times winner of the World's Strongest Woman competition.

Born in Malbork, Florczyk started her career at the age of 16, as a powerlifter. She won Polish Championships several times, and in 2000 became European Champion. As a first Polish athlete, she has broken the barrier of 500 kg in powerlifting. After she had been suspended in national team (the suspension has later been proven unfounded and overruled by the court), she began training weightlifting, becoming Polish Champion in juniors and vice Champion in seniors.

Since 2002, she started training on the equipment typical for strongwoman contests and only a year later won the World's Strongest Woman in Zambia. In 2004 she won the Europe's Strongest Woman in Ireland. She continued her World's Strongest Woman dominance by winning the title again in 2005, 2006 and 2008. Her winning percentage of 75% is the highest by any strongwoman in history.

== Powerlifting and bench press achievements ==
- 19 years old Juniors' Champion of Poland in bench press
- 23 years old Juniors' Champion of Poland in bench press
- Silver medal in Seniors' Polish Championship in bench press
- Silver medal on Polish Cup in bench press
- Gold medal on Polish Cup in powerlifting
- Seniors' Champion of Poland in powerlifting
- Sport class – champion' s international
- Member of National Team in bench press and powerlifting 1999–2001
- Powerlifting – second place in European Championship of seniors, Luxembourg 2000
- Record holder of Poland in powerlifting, weight category – 82,5 kg
- Juniors' Record holder of Europe in deadlift – 213 kg
- Silver medal in International Armwrestling Tournament
- As a first Polish woman she broke the barrier of 500 kg in powerlifting (507,5)
- As a first Polish woman she broke the barrier of 200 kg in deadlift

== Weightlifting achievements ==
- 2002 – Polish Vice Champion in seniors
- 2002 – Polish Champion in juniors
- 2002 – European Championship finalist in juniors

== Strongwoman achievements ==
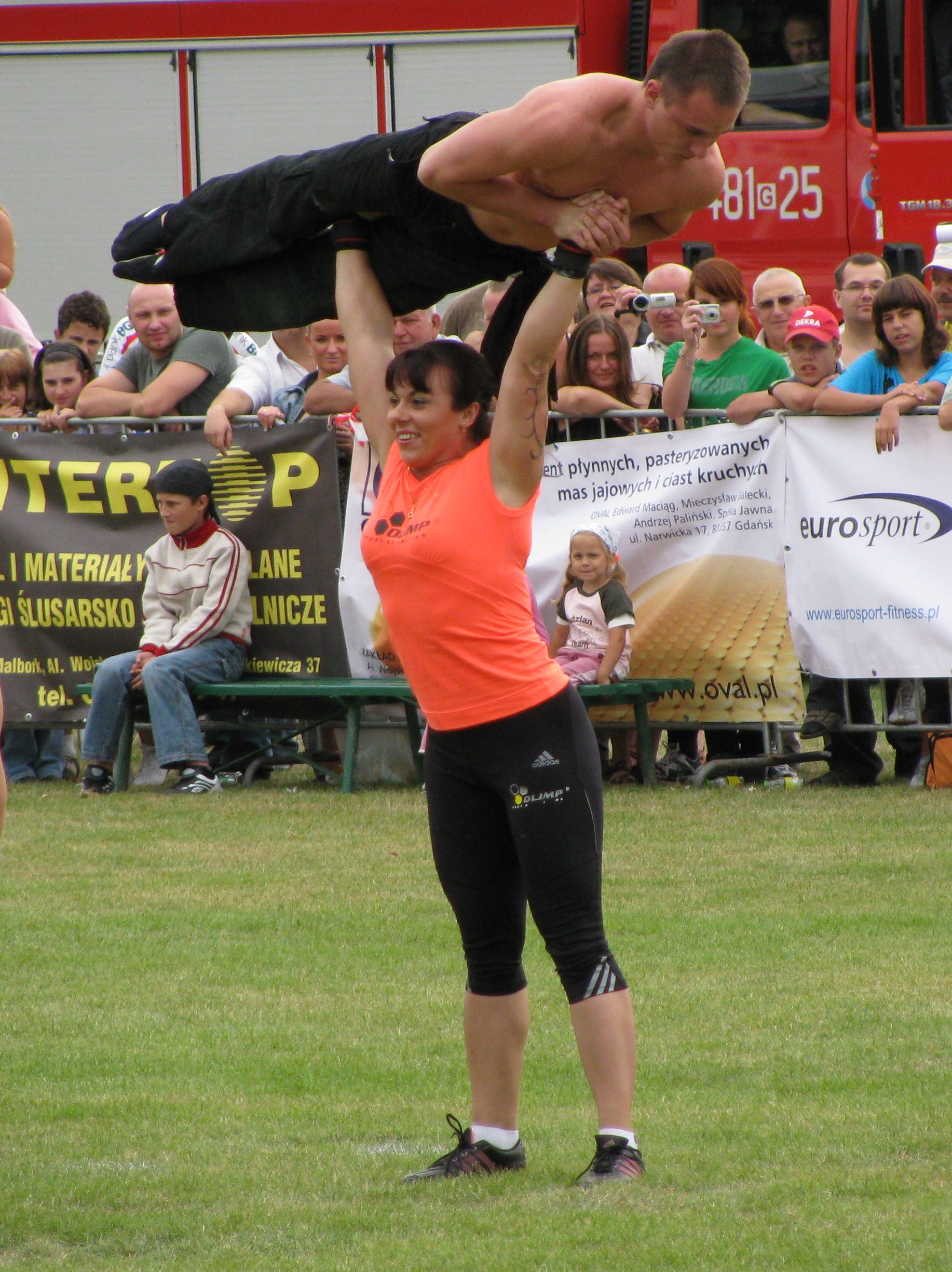
Florczyk in 2009

- 2003 – Second place on Scandinavian Championship in Vasteras, Sweden
- 2003 – First place on Built Solid Strongman Challenge in Columbus, USA
- 2003 – Fourth place on European Strongest Woman in Ireland
- 2003 – First place on World' s Strongest Woman in Zambia
- 2004 – First place on European Strongest Woman in Northern Ireland
- 2005 – First place on FitExpo in London
- 2005 – First place on International Norway's Championship in Larvik
- 2005 – First place on World's Strongwoman Championship in Northern Ireland
- 2005 – Second place on World's Highland Games Cup in Scotland
- 2005 – First place on Bregstaed contest, Norway
- 2005 – First place on Europe's Strongwoman Championship in Bydgoszcz
- 2006 – First place on World's Strongwoman Championship in Opalenica
- 2006 – First place, with Tyberiusz Kowalczyk, on international Strongman/Strongwoman Pairs Competition
- 2007 – Winning the European Strongwoman Championship – Trondheim, Norway
- 2008 – Winning the World Strongwoman Championship – Poland, Tczew

== Dancing on Ice ==
She appeared in the second edition of the Polish version of "Dancing on Ice" show (called "Gwiazdy tańczą na lodzie" in Poland). Her first partner was Marcin Czajka, but after two episodes he was replaced by Maciej Lewandowski. They finished the show at the 3rd place.

Episode	Song	Average grade	Detailed grades	Classification (Judges)	Classification (Viewers)
1	No one Alicia Keys	6.3	6, 7, 6, 6	8. place	6. place
2	Milord; Édith Piaf	7.5	7, 9, 7, 7	8. place	8. place
3	Don't Cry; Guns N' Roses	7.5	8, 8, 7, 7	4. place	5. place
4	Kung fu fighting Carl Douglas	8.0	8, 7, 9, 8	6. place	Skate-off
5	California Love; 2 Pac	8.5	9, 8, 8, 9	3. place	3. place
6	Seksapil; Eugeniusz Bodo	8.8	9, 9, 8, 9	2. place	2. place
7	Love at first sight Kylie Minogue	6.8	7, 7, 6, 7	6. place	4. place
7	Şımarık; Tarkan	8.5	9, 8, 8, 9	2. place	4. place
8	The Blue Danube; Johann Strauss II	7.0	7, 7, 7, 7	4. place	Skate-off
8	Bésame Mucho; Dalida	9.0	9, 9, 9, 9	2. place	Skate-off
9	The Passenger; Iggy Pop	8.0	7, 9, 8, 8	3. place	Skate-off
9	Let the sunshine In; Hair	8.0	8, 8, 8, 8	4. place	Skate-off
10	Carmen; Georges Bizet	9.0	9, 10, 9, 8	2. place	Skate-off
10	Just a Gigolo; Marlene Dietrich	8.8	8, 10, 9, 8	3. place	Skate-off

== The frying pan stunt and Guinness World Records ==
A major boost for her career came when a video clip was posted on the Internet, where Aneta was rolling a frying pan. The movie was unexpectedly popular and it got a lot of media interest. One of the results was the invitation (February 2008) for the Spanish edition of the show, where interesting tries of breaking the Guinness World Records are shown. Aneta had to roll most pans in one minute. She established the record rolling 4 pans.

In November 2008 she has improved her Record – rolling 5 pans. This time it was a part of the Chinese show, shot in Beijing.

Another record has been established once again in Spain, but this time it was about lifting adult men overhead. Aneta's result was 12, while her Spanish rival – athlete Irene Gutierrez – lifted 10 people.

== Dietetics Activity: Ketogenic Diet ==
Since 2018, Aneta Florczyk began her journey with dietetics, which came as a surprise to many of her fans, considering her previous achievements in the realm of strength sports. Aneta always emphasized the importance of a healthy diet for athletes, but also for every individual. Combining her knowledge of sports with dietetics, Aneta became an expert in the field of the ketogenic diet. Her approach to nutrition is based on the individual needs of each person and promotes healthy eating habits with limited carbohydrate intake.

Aneta offers dietary consultations and runs a blog about the ketogenic diet, through which she shares her expertise with others. Her work and advice have gained recognition among many seeking a balanced approach to nutrition that promotes health.
