= Arnold Strongwoman Classic =

Strength competition

Tournament information
- Location: Greater Columbus Convention Center, Columbus, Ohio
- Month played: March
- Established: 2017; 9 years ago
- Format: Multi-event competition

Current champion
- (Ukraine) Olga Liashchuk

The Arnold Strongwoman Classic (previously known as: Arnold Pro Strongwoman) is an annual competition featuring strongwomen athletes from around the world, meant for determining who is the strongest woman in the world. It was created by Arnold Schwarzenegger, Jim Lorimer and Terry Todd in 2002 initially for men, and extended by Jan Todd for women in 2017 as an offshoot of the Arnold Sports Festival. The competition takes place annually in Columbus, Ohio.

In 2023, the competition was officially renamed the "Arnold Strongwoman Classic" in parallel to its male counterpart, the Arnold Strongman Classic.

== Competition format ==
A total of 6 events are held throughout two consecutive days to test the strength of the contestants. Each event will grant points in a system where the event winner scores the maximum points allowed (10), followed by the runner up getting 1 point less, the second runner up getting 2 points less, and so on. At the end of all the events, the contestant who earns the most number of points across all 6 events is declared the winner.

== Regular events ==
1. Elephant Bar Deadlift - Contestants are required to lift a specially designed extra whipping elongated bar with Arnold Schwarzenegger inscribed weight plates from a standard 9" height. The apparatus was designed and manufactured by Rogue Fitness USA.
2. Timber carry - Contestants have to lift heavy barn timbers bolted together and travel up an inclined ramp. The event is also known as 'Frame Carry'.
3. American Oak - A unique log where the athletes have to press for the maximum number of reps.
4. Axle press - Contestants must lift the unique fat grip barbell attached to the Apollon wheels from the floor to overhead as many times as possible within a time frame.
5. Dumbbell press - Lifting the classic heavy "Circus" dumbbell. The basic rule is to use one hand at a time and lift the dumbbell overhead for many reps as possible.
6. Stone to Shoulder and Steinstossen - Contestants have to either hoist a stone to their shoulder for many reps as possible or throw the Unspunnen Stone overhead for the furthermost distance.
7. Bag over Bar - Contestants have to throw sandbags from 'a duck walk to an over head position' over a 12 ft bar.
8. Conan's Wheel of Pain - The event replicated the legendary grain mill from Conan the Barbarian (1982) where the contestants have to push the enormous contraption around in a circle for the maximum distance within 90 seconds.

== Winners ==
Year	Champion	Runner-up	3rd place	Location
2017	(United States) Liefia Ingalls	(United States) Kaitlin Burgess	(United States) Julie Rader	(United States) Columbus, Ohio
2018	(United Kingdom) Donna Moore	(United States) Liefia Ingalls	(United States) Kristin Rhodes	(United States) Columbus, Ohio
2019	(Ukraine) Olga Liashchuk	(United Kingdom) Donna Moore	(United Kingdom) Andrea Thompson	(United States) Columbus, Ohio
2020	(Ukraine) Olga Liashchuk	(United States) Danielle Vaji	(United States) Jessica Fithen	(United States) Columbus, Ohio
2021	The competition was not held due to COVID-19 pandemic.			
2022	(United States) Victoria Long	(United Kingdom) Andrea Thompson	(United States) Hannah Linzay	(United States) Columbus, Ohio
2023	(United States) Victoria Long	(United Kingdom) Rebecca Roberts	(United Kingdom) Andrea Thompson	(United States) Columbus, Ohio
2024	(United States) Angelica Jardine	(Ukraine) Olga Liashchuk	(United Kingdom) Lucy Underdown	(United States) Columbus, Ohio
2025	(Puerto Rico) Inez Carrasquillo	(Ukraine) Olga Liashchuk	(United States) Angelica Jardine	(United States) Columbus, Ohio
2026	(Ukraine) Olga Liashchuk	(Puerto Rico) Inez Carrasquillo	(United States) Angelica Jardine	(United States) Columbus, Ohio

== Champions breakdown ==
Name	Nat.	Wins
Olga Liashchuk	(Ukraine)	3
Victoria Long	(United States)	2
Inez Carrasquillo	(Puerto Rico)	1
Angelica Jardine	(United States)	1
Donna Moore	(United Kingdom)	1
Liefia Ingalls	(United States)	1

== See also ==
- America's Strongest Woman
- North America's Strongest Woman
- Rogue Invitational
- World's Strongest Woman
