= Olga Liashchuk =

Ukrainian strongwoman

Personal information
- Nationality: Ukrainian
- Born: 1 June 1985 (age 41)
- Occupation: Strongwoman
- Height: 5 ft 10 in (1.78 m)
- Weight: 96–108 kg (212–238 lb)
Medal record
Strongwoman
Representing Ukraine
World's Strongest Woman
1st	2014 World's Strongest Woman
3rd	2016 World's Strongest Woman
2nd	2021 World's Strongest Woman
1st	2022 World's Strongest Woman
Arnold Strongwoman Classic
5th	2018 Arnold Pro Strongwoman
1st	2019 Arnold Pro Strongwoman
1st	2020 Arnold Pro Strongwoman
4th	2022 Arnold Pro Strongwoman
4th	2023 Arnold Strongwoman Classic
2nd	2024 Arnold Strongwoman Classic
2nd	2025 Arnold Strongwoman Classic
1st	2026 Arnold Strongwoman Classic
Strongest Woman in the World
1st	2017 Strongest Woman in the World
2nd	2018 Strongest Woman in the World
Shaw Classic (Women)
2nd	2022 Shaw Classic Open (Women)
1st	2023 Shaw Classic Open (Women)
Rogue Invitational (Women)
2nd	2024 Rogue Invitational (Women)
2nd	2025 Rogue Invitational (Women)
Europe's Strongest Woman
2nd	2015 Europe's Strongest Woman
Arnold Amateur Strongwoman World Championships
3rd	2016 Arnold Amateur Strongwoman
4th	2017 Arnold Amateur Strongwoman
Strongwoman Grand Prix
1st	2017 Finland Grand Prix
1st	2022 Baltimore Grand Prix
America's Strongest Woman
2nd	2022 America's Strongest Woman
2nd	2023 America's Strongest Woman
1st	2024 America's Strongest Woman
1st	2025 America's Strongest Woman

Olga Liashchuk (Ukrainian: Ольга Лящук, born 1 June 1985) is a Ukrainian strongwoman from Donetsk. The winner of two World's Strongest Woman titles, three Arnold Strongwoman Classic titles, Strongest Woman in the World title, and the Shaw Classic Women's Open title, she's the most decorated professional strongwoman of all-time.

== Early life ==
Liashchuk's father was the inspiration behind her love for sports, gifting her a bicycle at a very young age.

She first competed in athletics. As a teenager, she competed as a hurdler and pole vaulter, achieving personal best jumps of 3.9 metres (12 ft 10 in) outdoors and 3.8 metres (12 ft 6 in) indoors. At Kyiv graduate school, she met her coach Mikhail Geraskevych who trained her for tug of war world games in Taiwan. Liashchuk was invited to the Ukrainian national rugby team but a knee injury stopped her from pursuing the sport. Geraskevych suggested Olga should try strength sports.

== Career ==
Just prior to entering major competitions, Liashchuk made a name for herself by attempting several world records. In 2014, Olga broke the Guinness World Record for the fastest time to crush 3 watermelons between the thighs, with a time of 14.65 seconds and with her friend Lidiia Hunko, broke the double Deadlift women's world record with 410 kg (904 lb).

With the new found fame, she entered mainstream strongwoman competitions and won 2014 World's Strongest Woman competition held in Pyhtää, Finland. The following year she emerged second at 2015 Europe's Strongest Woman competition. With the onset of Jan Todd extending the Arnold Strongman Classic to female participants, Liashchuk entered the 2016 Arnold Amateur Strongwoman World Championships in Columbus, Ohio and emerged third.

Taking part in more mainstream strongwoman competitions in ensuing years, Liashchuk won the 2017 Strongest Woman in the World competition in Las Vegas, Nevada and became the first athlete to win the Arnold Strongwoman Classic in Columbus, Ohio two consecutive times in 2019 and 2020.

In 2021 Liashchuk broke another Guinness World Record by carrying 3 people weighing a total of 226 kg (498 lb) across the stage during 2021 Ukraine's Got Talent. The following year she won her second World's Strongest Woman title in Daytona Beach, Florida.

In 2023 she won the Shaw Classic Women's Open title and in 2024 and 2025, won America's Strongest Woman title back to back. In 2026 she won the Arnold Strongwoman Classic title for the third time, becoming the first and only woman in history to do so.

In 23 international strongwoman competitions, Liashchuk has won nine titles, making her the most decorated professional strongwoman of all-time.

== Personal life ==
Liashchuk currently lives in the United States and trains at Southside Strength in Brentwood, Tennessee. An avid hiker, she enjoys her free time exploring the nature and going for walks in the parks. She also has a passion for fashion designing.

== Personal records ==
- Deadlift – 300.5 kg (662 lb) (Max), and 292 kg (644 lb) x 3 reps, equipped and with straps (during training, 2024)
- Rogue Elephant Bar Deadlift – 288.5 kg (636 lb) raw with straps (2023 Arnold Strongwoman Classic)
- Hummer tire Deadlift – 306 kg (675 lb) raw with straps, 15" from floor (2022 Arnold Pro Strongwoman)
- Deadlift (for reps) – 218 kg (481 lb) (Axle bar) x 10 reps (2022 World’s Strongest Woman), 170 kg (375 lb) x 15 reps (2019 Arnold Pro Strongwoman)
- Squat – 235 kg (518 lb) raw with wraps (during training, 2022)
- Sandbag over bar (Max weight) – 21.5 kg (47 lb) over 4.57 metres (15 ft 0 in) (2025 America's Strongest Woman) (World Record)
- Sandbag to shoulder – 90.5–124.75 kg (200–275 lb) 4 bags in 40.61 seconds (2022 World's Strongest Woman)
- Max Atlas Stone – 150 kg (331 lb) over 4 ft bar (2024 Music City Fit Expo)
- Atlas Stones – 6 Stones weighing 90.5–147.5 kg (200–325 lb) in 37.16 seconds (2022 World's Strongest Woman)
- Jeck Stones carry – 99.5 kg (219 lb) & 93.6 kg (206 lb) for 13.31 metres (43 ft 8 in) (2024 Arnold Strongwoman Classic)
- Natural Stone medley – 70 kg (154 lb) stone overhead press, 108 kg (238 lb) stone over 4 ft bar, and 118 kg (260 lb) stone to shoulder x 2 reps in 100.34 seconds (2024 Arnold Strongwoman Classic)
- Barbell split jerk (behind the neck) – 143 kg (315 lb) (2025 America's Strongest Woman)
- Log press/ American Oak – 122.5 kg (270 lb) x 4 reps (2023 Arnold Strongwoman Classic)
- Circus Dumbbell press – 80 kg (176 lb) x 2 reps (2024 Arnold Strongwoman Classic), 63.5 kg (140 lb) x 5 reps (2020 Arnold Pro Strongwoman)
- Car Walk – 317.5 kg (700 lb) (10 meter course) in 8.87 seconds (2022 World's Strongest Woman)
- Tire flip – 227 kg (500 lb) x 9 reps (2020 Arnold Pro Strongwoman)
- Thor's Hammer one arm grip lift – 68 kg (150 lb) (2024 Rogue Record Breakers)
- Conan's Wheel of Pain – 9,072 kg (20,000 lb) 18.19 meters (59 ft 8 in) (2023 Arnold Strongwoman Classic)

== Competitive record ==
Winning percentage: 39.1%
Podium percentage: 82.6%

	1st	2nd	3rd	Podium	4th	5th	6th	7th	8th	9th	10th	Total
International competitions	9	8	2	19	3	1						23
