= Rogue Invitational =

Annual sporting event

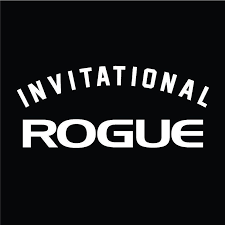

Tournament information
- Sport: CrossFit; Strongman
- Location: United States
- Established: 2019; 7 years ago
- Format: Multi-event competition
- Purse: $1.4 million (2021)
- Website: Rogue Invitational

Current champion
- CrossFit men: (United States) Dallin Pepper; CrossFit women: (United Kingdom) Lucy Campbell; Strongman: (United States) Trey Mitchell; Strongwoman: (United States) Angelica Jardine

Most recent tournament
- 2026 Rogue Invitational

The Rogue Invitational is an annual sporting event that includes a CrossFit competition and a Strongman competition. The event, organized by Rogue, started in 2019 as a CrossFit sanctioned competition, but has since become a major competition for CrossFit athletes. A contest for strongmen that featured the largest prize purse in strongman competition was added in 2021, and an additional one for strongwomen in 2024.

== History ==
The Rogue Invitational was announced in November 2018 as a sanctioned CrossFit event for the 2019 CrossFit Games. For the first invitational event, the top 10 male and top 10 female athletes from the 2018 CrossFit Games were given an invitation, as well as online qualifiers and other select top athletes making a total of 20 men, 20 women and 10 teams invited. The prize purse was $400,000, with the winners winning a top prize of $50,000 and a place at the CrossFit Games in their respective division, and all participants are guaranteed a cash prize. A Legends division was included for notable past CrossFit male and female athletes. The first Rogue Invitational also hosted the Rogue Record Breakers whereby strongmen and strongwomen can attempt to break 4 Strongman records. The competition was held at the Rogue company headquarters in Columbus, Ohio over two days in May 2019. The inaugural Invitational was contested by 19 men, 20 women and 8 teams, and it won by Mat Fraser for the men's competition, Tia-Clair Toomey for the women's, and CrossFit OC3 for the team's. The competition was live-streamed, and Rogue partnered with CBS to broadcast edited segments of the competition after the event.

In 2020, due to the ongoing Coronavirus pandemic, the event was postponed and held online in June, to be competed by 18 men and 18 women, including top Games athletes, qualifiers (from the qualification stage now called "The Q") and invitees. No team competition was held this year or in subsequent years.

The third Rogue Invitational returned to live competition in 2021, which took place over three days in October at Dell Diamond near Austin, Texas. It provided a prize purse of $1.25 million at the minimum, the biggest in CrossFit outside of the CrossFit Games, and it became the only CrossFit competition that pays out to all athletes competing including airfare and accommodation. It also expanded to include a strongman contest this year, instituting the biggest prize purse in the history of strongman competition. 20 men and 20 women in CrossFit (no qualifiers this year) were invited to compete in the CrossFit competition, while the field for the strongman competition had 10 athletes including 4 WSM champions. Martins Licis was the first winner of the strongman competition at Rogue Invitational.

In 2022, 15 top male and 15 top female athletes from the CrossFit Games were invited, and at least 5 men and 5 women from the qualifier which returned this year. The competition was extended to four days this year with an extra offsite event added.

In 2024, the Invitational was moved to Aberdeen Scotland. This year, invitations were issued using a new ranking system based on the performance of athletes over a 5-year period but weighted in favor of more recent competitions including the Open, Quarterfinals, CrossFit Games and Rogue Invitational. It includes an "Exceptions Points Table" to award points for those who missed a competition for any specific reason. The top 10 in this system will be invited, with five from the Q online qualifiers, and five more at the discretion of Rogue. A strongwoman competition with the biggest prize purse in the history of the sport was added this year.

== Events ==
The first Rogue Invitational had 8 events for individuals, 7 for teams and 4 for Legends. No team competition was held after the first year. The second featured 6 events, the third 7, the fourth 10. The programming of the events at Rogue has a bias toward strength.

The first strongman competition had five events. They include the "Wheel of Pain" created by Rogue, which is an implement inspired by the film Conan the Barbarian and the largest implement ever created for a strongman competition and first used in the Arnold Strongman Classic. Other events included the Rogue-created Elephant Bar for max deadlift and Inver Stones over hitching post. Six events were scheduled over two days in the second strongman competition, with three events repeated from the first competition: Cyr Dumbbell Ladder, Yoke Carry & Overhead Log Lift Medley, Stone Over Hitching Post. Specially-constructed equipment include "Rogue-a-Coaster Pull" where competitors pulled 600 lbs in a cart up a slope simulating a roller coaster ramp, and "Tower of Power" that featured an elevated 900 lbs deadlift on a platform.

== Winners ==
=== Champions ===
Year	Venue	CrossFit		Strongman	
Year	Venue	Men	Women	Men	Women
2019	Rogue HQ, Columbus, Ohio	(United States) Mat Fraser	(Australia) Tia-Clair Toomey	Not held	Not held
2020	Online	(Canada) Patrick Vellner	(Australia) Tia-Clair Toomey	Not held	Not held
2021	Dell Diamond, Austin, Texas	(United States) Justin Medeiros	(Australia) Tia-Clair Toomey	(United States) Martins Licis	Not held
2022	Dell Diamond, Austin, Texas	(United States) Justin Medeiros	(Hungary) Laura Horvath	(Ukraine) Oleksii Novikov	Not held
2023	Dell Diamond, Austin, Texas	(Canada) Patrick Vellner	(Hungary) Laura Horvath	(Canada) Mitchell Hooper	Not held
2024	P&J Live, Aberdeen, Scotland	(Canada) Jeffrey Adler	(Australia) Tia-Clair Toomey	(Canada) Mitchell Hooper	(Puerto Rico) Inez Carrasquillo
2025	P&J Live, Aberdeen, Scotland	(Canada) Jeffrey Adler	(Hungary) Laura Horvath	(Canada) Mitchell Hooper	(Puerto Rico) Inez Carrasquillo
2026	P&J Live, Aberdeen, Scotland	(United States) Dallin Pepper	(United Kingdom) Lucy Campbell	(United States) Trey Mitchell	(United States) Angelica Jardine

=== Podiums ===
==== CrossFit - Men ====
Year	Champion	Runner-up	3rd place
2019	(United States) Mat Fraser	(Canada) Patrick Vellner	(United States) Cole Sager
2020	(Canada) Patrick Vellner	(Iceland) Björgvin Guðmundsson	(United States) Noah Ohlsen
2021	(United States) Justin Medeiros	(Canada) Patrick Vellner	(Canada) Jeffrey Adler
2022	(United States) Justin Medeiros	(United States) Chandler Smith	(Canada) Jeffrey Adler
2023	(Canada) Patrick Vellner	(Canada) Jeffrey Adler	(United States) Roman Khrennikov
2024	(Canada) Jeffrey Adler	(Canada) Brent Fikowski	(United States) Jayson Hopper
2025	(Canada) Jeffrey Adler	(United States) Justin Medeiros	(United States) Roman Khrennikov
2025	(United States) Dallin Pepper	(United States) James Sprague	(United States) Tudor Magda

==== CrossFit - Women ====
Year	Champion	Runner-up	3rd place
2019	(Australia) Tia-Clair Toomey	(Iceland) Sara Sigmundsdóttir	(Iceland) Anníe Mist Þórisdóttir
2020	(Australia) Tia-Clair Toomey	(Iceland) Sara Sigmundsdóttir	(New Zealand) Jamie Simmonds
2021	(Australia) Tia-Clair Toomey	(Iceland) Anníe Mist Þórisdóttir	(Poland) Gabriela Migała
2022	(Hungary) Laura Horvath	(Iceland) Anníe Mist Þórisdóttir	(Canada) Emma Lawson
2023	(Hungary) Laura Horvath	(Australia) Tia-Clair Toomey	(Canada) Emma Lawson
2024	(Australia) Tia-Clair Toomey	(Hungary) Laura Horvath	(United States) Arielle Loewen
2025	(Hungary) Laura Horvath	(United States) Alex Gazan	(United Kingdom) Lucy Campbell
2025	(United Kingdom) Lucy Campbell	(Hungary) Laura Horvath	(Poland) Gabriela Migała

==== Strongman ====
Year	Champion	Runner-up	3rd place
2021	(United States) Martins Licis	(United Kingdom) Tom Stoltman	(Ukraine) Oleksii Novikov
2022	(Ukraine) Oleksii Novikov	(United States) Trey Mitchell	(Canada) Mitchell Hooper
2023	(Canada) Mitchell Hooper	(United Kingdom) Tom Stoltman	(Poland) Mateusz Kieliszkowski
2024	(Canada) Mitchell Hooper	(Iceland) Hafþór Júlíus Björnsson & (United Kingdom) Tom Stoltman	
2025	(Canada) Mitchell Hooper	(United States) Trey Mitchell	(United Kingdom) Tom Stoltman
2026	(United States) Trey Mitchell	(Latvia) Martins Licis	(South Africa) Rayno Nel

==== Strongwoman ====
Year	Champion	Runner-up	3rd place
2024	(Puerto Rico) Inez Carrasquillo	(Ukraine) Olga Liashchuk	(United Kingdom) Lucy Underdown
2025	(Puerto Rico) Inez Carrasquillo	(Ukraine) Olga Liashchuk	(United States) Angelica Jardine
2026	(United States) Angelica Jardine	(Puerto Rico) Inez Carrasquillo	(United Kingdom) Lucy Underdown

== See also ==
- America's Strongest Woman
- Arnold Strongwoman Classic
- North America's Strongest Woman
- World's Strongest Woman
