= Rogue Fitness =

American fitness equipment manufacturer

- Type: Private
- Industry: Strength & conditioning equipment manufacturer
- Founded: 2007
- Founder: Bill Henniger
- Headquarters: Columbus, Ohio, United States
- Area served: Worldwide
- Owner: Bill Henniger
- Number of employees: 1,400 (2022)
- Divisions: Rogue Supply Co.
- Subsidiaries: Rogue Europe; Rogue Australia
- Website: roguefitness.com

Rogue Fitness (legally named Coulter Ventures, LLC, often branded and referred to as Rogue) is an American manufacturer and distributor of gym equipment based in Columbus, Ohio. It produces strength and conditioning equipment such as weightlifting barbells, plates and racks, kettlebells, as well as a range of fitness related equipment for CrossFit boxes, home gyms, military, collegiate, and professional sports teams.

== History ==
We started as a garage gym in the CrossFit community. Rogue began by selling jump ropes and boxes out of a small space. We were at the 2008 CrossFit Games and it was there when we knew how we wanted to contribute to the CrossFit Community. We've done so ever since. CrossFit was and is crucial to Rogue Fitness's success.

— Bill Henniger,

Rogue originally started in 2007 in Toledo, Ohio, by Bill Henniger when he had difficulty finding the necessary equipment for his new gym, a CrossFit affiliate. He set up an e-commerce one-stop site roguefitness.com, with the intention of selling all the equipment necessary for a CrossFit gym. Initially, Rogue only sold other manufacturers' equipment through its website, but there were still issues with customers having to deal with multiple manufacturers and their own shipping fees and schedules, as well as equipment not entirely suitable for CrossFit. In order to resolve the issues and speed up the delivery, the company started warehousing the equipment and eventually building some of the equipment itself. The company relies primarily on local and U.S. manufacturing to allow it to respond quicker to demand.

The company grew into a 5,000 square foot (460 m^{2}) facility in Columbus that was next to a CrossFit box that Henniger also owned. Rogue began offering more products and also started manufacturing more of them. It had a 175,000 square foot (16,300 m^{2}) manufacturing facility by 2014. It produces a variety of strength training equipment, such as barbells, dumbbells, kettlebells and medicine balls, and as well as other exercise products, such as its Echo Bike.

Rogue Europe launched in Finland in January 2014 with Juha Puonti and 2009 CrossFit Games male champion Mikko Salo. It opened a branch in Belgium for its European customers.

In 2018, Rogue moved into a 600,000 square foot (56,000 m^{2}) building on 30 acres (12 ha), a former Timken Company property located on the southwest corner of East Fifth and Cleveland avenues in Columbus. The new building consolidated their administrative, manufacturing, distribution, and retail operations. It includes two gyms and showroom. It acquired a series of other fitness-related companies, including Nebula Fitness in 2012, Pendlay, OSO Barbell and Reflex Fitness Products in 2018, and powerlifting equipment manufacturer Ghost Strong in 2022.

Rogue was a contender for Inc.'s 2018 Company of the Year.

Rogue Fitness had 200 employees in 2014, increasing to 600 in 2019, and 850 in 2020. It has 1,400 employees worldwide as of 2022.

== Activities ==
Rogue has been associated with CrossFit from its beginning. Rogue is one of the primary suppliers for equipment for CrossFit boxes (gyms) around the world. It started supplying equipment for the CrossFit Games in 2009, before becoming the sole provider to the Games and regional events in 2010. Fifteen semi-trucks of equipment were needed to supply the 2013 CrossFit Games at the StubHub Center in Carson, California, up from nine trucks used to supply the 2011 CrossFit Games. Rogue often creates new or unusual equipment specially for the Games. It organizes Rogue Invitational, one of the most significant competitions for CrossFit athletes. The Invitational features the biggest prize purse for CrossFit athletes outside of the Games, and it is the only CrossFit competition that pays out to all athletes competing including airfare and accommodation. The company briefly cut off its ties with CrossFit after controversial statements made by CrossFit founder Greg Glassman in 2020, but has resumed their association after Glassman resigned.

Rogue has also expanded into building equipment for strongman, powerlifting, and Olympic weightlifting. It became the official supplier of USA Weightlifting, the Arnold Strongman Classic, and the World's Strongest Man in 2017. It also created implements used in competitions, such as the largest implement ever created specifically for a strongman competition, the "Wheel of Pain" inspired by the film Conan the Barbarian used in the Arnold Classic. It has staged a series of events since 2015 for those who wish to set weightlifting records titled Rogue Record Breakers at festivals such as Arnold Sports Classic, and it also introduced the Rogue Challenge for various sports starting December 2020. Rogue Invitational also expanded to include a strongman contest since 2021.

The company sponsors numerous CrossFit athletes around the world, such as Rich Froning Jr., Ben Smith, Camille Leblanc-Bazinet, Mat Fraser, Katrín Davíðsdóttir, Jason Khalipa and Justin Medeiros. One of the first sponsored athletes was Henniger's future wife and 2008 CrossFit Games female champion, Caity Matter Henniger. Rogue also sponsors top tier Strongman athletes such as Hafþór Júlíus Björnsson, Brian Shaw, Martins Licis and Mateusz Kieliszkowski.

Rogue started manufacturing medical equipment such as ventilators and personal protective equipment in response to the COVID-19 pandemic in 2020. It also increased its production of gym equipment due to increasing demand from home gyms during lockdown that led to shortages.
