= Samantha Briggs =

English CrossFit athlete

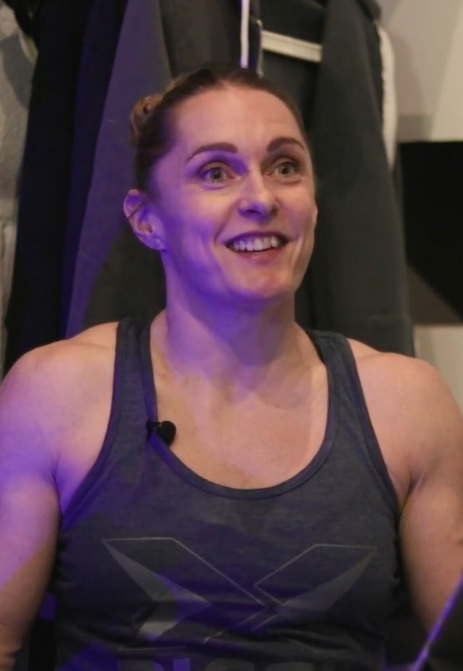

Personal information
- Nationality: English
- Born: 14 March 1982 (age 44) Manchester, England
- Occupation: Professional CrossFit Athlete
- Height: 5 ft 6 in (1.68 m)
- Weight: 135 lb (61 kg)

Sport
- Sport: CrossFit

Achievements and titles
- World finals: 2013 CrossFit Games champion

Samantha "Sam" Briggs (born 14 March 1982) is an English CrossFit athlete best known for winning the CrossFit Games in 2013. She has qualified for the CrossFit Games seven additional times: in 2010, 2011, 2015, 2016, 2017, 2019, and 2021. She finished four of her seven appearances in the top 5 overall. Briggs lived and trained in Miami, USA for the 2015 CrossFit season, but now resides in her native England.

Before she found CrossFit in 2009, she competed in amateur-level duathlons, triathlons, and football in the Northern Premiership League (as a centre midfielder or centre-back). She worked as a firefighter with West Yorkshire Fire and Rescue Service. Briggs then took a sabbatical to concentrate on CrossFit fulltime. In February 2022, Briggs announced that she would retire from CrossFit after the 2022 season to return to firefighting in August.

== CrossFit Games career ==
Briggs first qualified for the CrossFit Games in 2010, finishing second at the 2010 Europe Regional behind soon-to-be twice Games champion Annie Thorisdottir.

At the 2010 CrossFit Games, Briggs' highest finish was third place on "Pyramid Double Helen", which she completed in 18:30. The only two women to beat her were the overall second and first place Games finishers, Annie Thorisdottir (17:53) and Kristan Clever (18:23). Briggs finished in 19th place overall.

By 2011, Briggs was a more developed athlete and improved to 4th overall. Briggs earned top 10 event finishes on 7 of the 10 events, including two event wins on "The End 2" and "The End 3".

In 2012, Briggs was sidelined by a knee injury. She officially withdrew from the competition in March, midway through the CrossFit Open, the first stage of qualifying for the CrossFit Games, citing maltracking of her right kneecap which had been an ongoing issue for a couple of years. She later learned she also had a fractured patella.

During her year off, Briggs changed her approach to training. The head trainer at CrossFit 3D, a CrossFit gym that Briggs attended in the past, described her approach to training in the early years as very high volume metabolic conditioning which resulted in her "smashing herself into the ground." With awareness of her injuries, her coach, Steadman, and sports therapist, James Jowsey, were able to program workouts that would not cause further damage. As she laid off many workouts that involved her legs, she spent her time developing her upper body gymnastics skills on the pull-up bar, rope, and gymnastics rings, and also opened her own CrossFit affiliate, Train Manchester.

=== 2013: CrossFit Games champion ===
In 2013, Briggs returned to competition with the drive of an athlete who had been forced onto the sideline for a year. She won the worldwide Open, and then the Europe Regional to qualify for the 2013 CrossFit Games in Carson. This year the two-time champion, Annie Thorisdottir (2011, 2012), was unable to defend the title that year because of a back injury. At the Games, Briggs put in performances that helped bolster her nickname of "The Engine" such as completing a half-marathon row of 21,097 meters on an indoor Concept 2 rower that Briggs finished in one hour and 27 minutes (1:27:47.9). Briggs had three event wins, and won decisively overall, with a 79 points lead over second-place finisher Lindsey Valenzuela.

The next spring, Briggs won the Open yet again but failed to qualify for the Games after placing fourth at the 2014 Europe Regional. Briggs finished in 26th place on the maximum distance handstand walk event, going only 65 ft (20 m), early in the competition and even with three event wins and never finishing lower than eighth on any other event, missed out on qualification by six points. Briggs became the first reigning individual champion to be eliminated at the Regionals.

=== 2015–2016: fourth place finishes ===
ESPNW named Briggs an "athlete to watch" at the 2015 CrossFit Games. Midway through the CrossFit Open qualifying stage, she injured her Sacroiliac joint, and prior to the Regionals she broke her foot. Despite the injury, Briggs still managed to earn 2nd overall at the 2015 Atlantic Regional, qualifying for the 2015 CrossFit Games. At the 2015 Games, Briggs was able to finished 4th overall. Her best performance was on Murph, in which the athletes completed in the over 100 °F (38 °C) temperatures in the afternoon. She won the event in 39 minutes, 10 seconds, more than a minute ahead of the next closest female athlete, Alethea Boon of New Zealand, and quicker than all the male athletes bar one, Björgvin Karl Guðmundsson of Iceland.

Briggs nearly missed the 2016 CrossFit Games due to an issue with visa. In the first event, the Ranch Trail Run, she beat all the other female athletes, finishing nearly a minute faster than runner-up Kristin Holte, and faster than all of the men except Mat Fraser and Josh Bridges. She also won the Climbing Snail event. She again finished just out of podium in fourth place this year.

=== 2017–2022 ===
At the 2017 CrossFit Games, Briggs started strongly and tied first place with eventual winner Tia-Clair Toomey after the first day. However, she faltered in her weak events, such as 1-RM Snatch, eventually finishing ninth.

In 2018, Briggs suffered from a severe elbow injury and had to undergo surgery. Despite the injury, she managed to qualify for the Masters division just before undergoing the surgery. She competed as a Master at the 2018 CrossFit Games, but again nearly missed the Games due to visa issue. She finished second in the 35–39 Masters division.

Briggs won the first ever sanctional, the Dubai Crossfit Championship, in December 2018 to qualify for the 2019 CrossFit Games.

In 2021, at the age of nearly 40, Briggs finished fourth at the Dubai CrossFit Championship. She managed to qualify for the 2021 CrossFit Games; she finished 6th originally at the German Throwdown, but Emma Tall was penalised in one event in a review and Briggs was elevated to fifth to qualify for the Games. However, At the Games, Briggs was placed 21st after 10 events, just below the cut line and she did not participate in the final five events.

In 2022, Briggs announced that she would retire from CrossFit after the 2022 season in August to return to the fire service. She retired after failing to qualify for the 2022 Games at the Strength in Depth semifinal.

Briggs, however, continues to compete in the age-group division in 2023.

== CrossFit Games results ==
Year	Division	Games	Regionals		Open
2010	Individual	19th	2nd (Europe)		—
2011	Individual	4th	2nd (Europe)		3rd
2012	Individual	— (injury)			
2013	Individual	1st	1st (Europe)		1st
2014	Individual	—	4th (Europe)		1st
2015	Individual	4th	2nd* (Atlantic)		82nd*
2016	Individual	4th	4th (Meridian)		2nd
2017	Individual	9th	2nd (Meridian)		12th
2017	Masters (35–39)	—	1st (online qualifier)		1st
2018	Individual	—	— (injury)		29th
2018	Masters (35–39)	2nd	2nd (online qualifier)		1st
Year	Division	Games	Qualifier		Open
2019	Individual	18th	1st (Dubai); 1st (Australian)		22nd (world); 1st (United Kingdom)
2019	Masters (35–39)	—	—		1st
2020	Individual	—	5th (Filthy 150); 3rd (Dubai)		135th (World); 6th (United Kingdom)
2020	Team (Team WIT)	—	3rd (WZA)		—
2020	Masters (35–39)	—	—		9th
Year	Division	Games	Semifinal	Quarterfinal	Open
2021	Individual	21st	5th (German Throwdown)	12th (Europe)	80th (World)
2021	Masters (35–39)	—	7th (online qualifier)	—	3rd
2022	Individual	—	7th (Strength in Depth)	67th (Europe)	90th (World)
"—" denotes competitions Briggs did not participate in

=== Autobiography ===
Briggs autobiography, Start Your Engines: My Unstoppable CrossFit Journey, was released in 2020.
