= Mal O'Brien =

CrossFit athlete

Personal information
- Born: Mallory O'Brien; November 22, 2003 (age 22)
- Height: 5 ft 3 in (160 cm)
- Weight: 145 lb (66 kg)
- Website: www.instagram.com/malobrien_/

Sport
- Sport: CrossFit
Medal record
Representing United States
CrossFit Games
Silver medal – second place	2022	Women

Mallory O'Brien is a CrossFit athlete. In 2022, at the age of 18, she came in second at the 2022 CrossFit Games, becoming the youngest ever person to podium. Earlier in the year, she was the youngest ever person to win the Crossfit Open, and in 2021 was named CrossFit's Rookie of the Year.

== Early life ==
Mallory O'Brien was born to Joe and Nicole O'Brien. She has been athletic from a young age, and was a competitive gymnast since the age of 3, reaching level 6. She became involved in CrossFit at the age of 10 when her mother took her to a CrossFit gym in Des Moines, Iowa. She started to compete at the age of 12 by participating in online qualifiers for competitions such as Wodapalooza. She initially trained under former Games athlete Elijah Muhammad for a number of years before moving to train under James Townsend in late 2019. In 2020, Mal was diagnosed with Lyme disease.

She joined HWPO in January 2022 to be trained by the former champion Mat Fraser.

== Career ==
O'Brien started competing in the teen division of the CrossFit Games at the age of 14 starting in 2018 and finished 4th in the 14–15 age group in her debut season. She also qualified for the 2019 CrossFit Games and finished 5th in her age group.

She did not compete in 2020 to recover from a number of health issues. She was diagnosed with Lyme disease in early 2020.

At the 2021 CrossFit Games, O'Brien competed in the elite women division for the first time. She won Individual Event 4, and became the youngest-ever competitor to win an event at the Games. She eventually finished 7th overall and was named Rookie of the Year, thereby becoming the first athlete to win the accolade while still eligible for the teen divisions.

In 2022, O'Brien became the youngest person to win the CrossFit Open. At the 2022 CrossFit Games, O'Brien finished in second-place after six-time winner Tia-Clair Toomey, which made her the youngest-ever person to reach the podium at the CrossFit Games.

== CrossFit Games results ==
Year	Games			Open
2018	4th (Girls 14–15)			2nd (Girls 14–15, Worldwide) 2nd (Girls 14–15, US)
2019	5th (Girls 14–15)			4th (Girls 14–15, Worldwide) 4th (Girls 14–15, US)
2020	Absent for health reasons			
Year	Games	Semifinal	Quarterfinal	Open
2021	7th	2nd (Granite Games)	3rd (North America)	5th (Worldwide) 3rd (North America)
2022	2nd	1st (Granite Games)	4th (Worldwide); 1st (North America)	1st (Worldwide); 1st (North America)
2023	Did not compete		1st (Worldwide); 1st (North America East)	1st (Worldwide); 1st (North America East)
