= 2016 CrossFit Games =

Athletic competition

- Venue: Aromas Ranch; StubHub Center
- Location: Aromas, California; Redondo Beach, California; Carson, California
- Dates: July 19–24, 2016

Champions
- Men: Mathew Fraser
- Women: Katrín Tanja Davíðsdóttir
- Team: CrossFit Mayhem Freedom

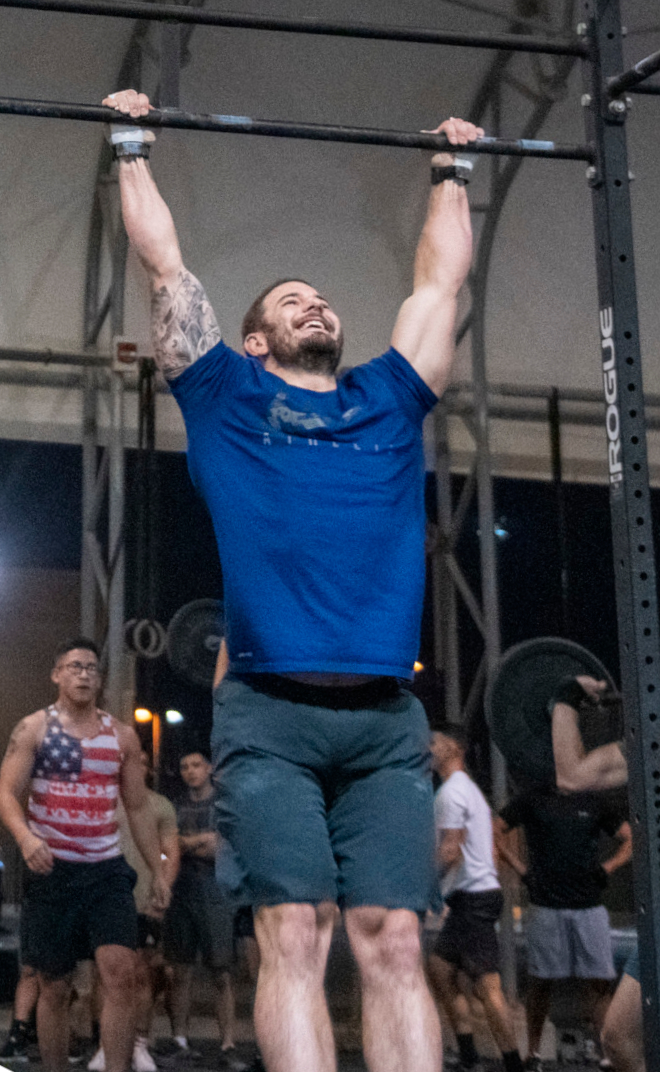
Mat Fraser, male winner of the 2016 CrossFit Games

The 2016 CrossFit Games were the tenth CrossFit Games held on July 19–24, 2016 at the StubHub Center in Carson, California and on a ranch in Aromas, California, United States. The men's competition was won by Mathew Fraser, the women's by Katrín Tanja Davíðsdóttir, and the Affiliate Cup was awarded to CrossFit Mayhem Freedom.

Over 324,000 from 175 countries participated in the Open this season. At the Games, the women's competition was tightly fought, with the lead changing many times over the course of the Games, but Davíðsdóttir managed to hold off a strong challenge from Tia-Clair Toomey to win a second time. In the men's competition, Mat Fraser won with a 197-point lead over second-place Ben Smith, at the time the biggest margin of victory in the history of the Games, marking the beginning of Fraser's dominance at the Games for the next four years until his retirement after the 2020 Games.

== Qualification ==
=== Open ===
The Open was held over five weeks from February 25 through March 28, 2016. Five workouts were released, one per week, for the athletes to complete. 324,307 competitors from 175 countries registered to participate in the Open. As with the 2015 Games, athletes from the Open in 17 regions were funnelled into 8 super regions, and 260 (40 men, 40 women and 30 teams of 6) from each of the 8 regions went on to compete in the Regionals. Noah Ohlsen and Jamie Greene were the respective winners of the men's and women's competitions at the Open.

=== Regionals ===
The Regionals were held over 3 weekends between May 13 and May 29. As with the 2015 Games, the scoring system for Regionals was no longer the same as the Open, instead the scoring system from the Games was used (100 for first, 95 for second, etc.). From each Regional, the top 5 of each division qualified for the Games; in total 40 men, 40 women and 40 teams were invited to the Games.

== Individual ==
=== Wednesday, July 20, 2016 ===
In celebration of the tenth Crossfit Games, the first day of events for the Individual Men and Women divisions took place at the site of the first three CrossFit Games at the Ranch in Aromas, California (a site owned by the family of the director of the CrossFit Games, Dave Castro). The competitors left Carson in the morning and flew into San Jose, California, in order to participate in the first three events.

The first three events were based on the first three events held for the 2009 Games, but with some modifications. In event three, Medicine ball instead of sandbag was used for the hill run, with wall ball shots and GHD added before the run.

The athletes returned to Carson that evening; however, Southwest Airlines suffered a technical glitch grounding several flights and creating many delays. Some athletes reported that they did not return to their Carson hotel until after midnight Thursday morning.

==== Events 1: Ranch Trail Run ====
- 7 kilometer trail run

Event 1 was a seven kilometer run was based around a similar event in the 2009 CrossFit Games. Mat Fraser and Samantha Briggs were the winners of this event.

==== Event 2: Ranch Deadlift Ladder ====
- Deadlift ladder

The second event, a deadlift ladder, followed 10 minutes after the runners finished, but with the athletes lifting in the reverse order that they finish the run. The event was similar to Event 2 of 2009 but with heavier weights since many were able to lift the heaviest weights in 2009. The men's weight started at 425 pounds and ended at 615 pounds while the women's weight started at 275 pounds and ended at 415 pounds. The last place finisher of the ranch run event start the event first, ten minutes after completing the run. Sam Dancer (the last place finisher on the run) and Brooke Wells (who took 37th of 40 on the run) both won the event by completing the ladder.

==== Event 3: Ranch Mini Chipper ====
- 50 wall ball shots
- 25 medicine ball GHD sit-ups
- Hill sprint with medicine ball

The last event was a "chipper," a workout involving multiple exercises done sequentially without returning (as in "chipping away" at the number of repetitions) for the fastest time. The competitors started with 50 wall ball shots, a squat into tossing a medicine ball 9 or 10 feet up to target on a wall. Once completed, they performed 25 sit-ups with the medicine ball on a glute-hamstring developer (GHD), a piece of equipment where the feet lock in and the sit-up is performed at a greater range of motion. The chipper was finished with a hill sprint while carrying the medicine ball. The men used a 30-pound medicine ball and the women used a 20-pound medicine ball. Brent Fikowski and Annie Thorisdottir won the event. Mat Fraser was the overall leader in the men's competition after 3 events and he kept the lead all through the Games.

=== Thursday, July 21, 2016 ===
==== Event 4: Ocean Swim ====
- 500 meter ocean swim

The only event of day two was an out-and-back ocean swim at Redondo Beach, California. Tia-Clair Toomey and Jonne Koski won with times of 7:28 and 6:54 respectively.

=== Friday, July 22, 2016 ===
==== Event 5: Murph ====
While wearing a weighted vest:

- 1 mile run
- 100 pull-ups
- 200 push-ups
- 300 air squats
- 1 mile run

This specific workout was created in honor of US Navy SEAL Lt. Michael P. Murphy, who was killed in Afghanistan on July 28, 2005. "Murph" is probably CrossFit's most famous "Hero" workout (a specific routine named in honor of a fallen hero) and Murph is usually performed by American affiliates on Memorial Day. The announcement of this event was controversial because it was also done in the 2015 CrossFit Games where a number of athletes suffered serious heat injuries. The weighted vests were 20lbs. for men and 14lbs. for the women. The exercises between the runs was broken up into five rounds of 20 pull-ups, 40 push-ups, and 60 air squats. Josh Bridges and Kari Pearce won the event.

==== Event 6: Squat Clean Pyramid ====
- 10 squat cleans at 245 lbs for men and 165 lbs for women
- 8 squat cleans at 265 lbs for men and 180 lbs for women
- 6 squat cleans at 285 lbs for men and 195 lbs for women
- 4 squat cleans at 305 lbs for men and 205 lbs for women
- 2 squat cleans at 325 lbs for men and 215 lbs for women

Squat cleans are a common movement used in weightlifting with the requirement that the competitor must squat below parallel on the clean. The athletes performed a decreasing number of repetitions at increasing weights. Alex Anderson and Kara Webb won the event.

==== Event 7: Double DT ====
10 rounds for time with a 155-pound barbell for the men and a 105-pound barbell for the women:

- 12 deadlifts
- 9 hang power cleans
- 6 jerks

"DT" is a CrossFit hero workout named for fallen airman USAF SSgt. Timothy P. Davis, and usually performed for five rounds. In the 2015 Games, fans were given a vote for either Heavy DT or Double DT and the heavy version was chosen, so Double DT was programmed for the 2016 Games. Katrín Davíðsdóttir and Samuel Kwant won the event.

=== Saturday, July 23, 2016 ===
==== Event 8: Climbing Snail ====
Three rounds for time of:

- 500 meter berm run
- 2 rope ascents
- 40 foot snail push
- 2 rope ascents – except for the final round.

The event took place inside the soccer stadium and consisted of running across the field and through the rope climbing rig and then up the stairs and behind the jumbotron at the StubHub Center. On the return, the athletes then had to climb up a rope in the middle of the field. The rope was situated so that the bottom of the rope was above the heads of the athletes so that they had to jump up to grab the rope and do the first pulls without using their legs. The final movement was pushing what was called a "snail," a large heavy barrel that had to be rolled for 40 feet. The event was won by Samantha Briggs and Brent Fikowski.

==== Event 9: The Separator ====
This event was performed in a different order for the Men and Women's competition.

Men's Event 9

- 12 ring handstand push-ups
- 15 back squats at 225 pounds
- 20 burpees
- 9 ring handstand push-ups
- 18 front squats at 205 pounds
- 20 burpees
- 6 ring handstand push-ups
- 21 overhead squats at 185 pounds
- 20 burpees

Women's Event 9

- 15 back squats at 165 pounds
- 20 burpees
- 6 ring handstand push-ups
- 18 front squats at 145 pounds
- 20 burpees
- 4 ring handstand push-ups
- 21 overhead squats at 125 pounds
- 20 burpees
- 2 ring handstand push-ups

The handstand push-ups were done with gymnastic rings and it was the second time the movement has featured at the CrossFit Games. It also had strict point penalties for any athletes that could not either finish the first set for the men or one push-up for the women. The event was won by Kari Pearce and Cole Sager.

==== Event 10: 100% ====
For time:

- 40 box jump overs (30 inches high for men, 24 inches high for women)
- 20 D-ball cleans (150 pound ball for men, 100 pound ball for women)

This event was won by Alessandra Pichelli and Brent Fikowski.

=== Sunday, July 24, 2016 ===
==== Event 11: Handstand Walk ====
- 280 foot handstand walk for time

Jacob Heppner and Katrín Davíðsdóttir won.

==== Event 12: Suicide Sprint ====
- 840 foot shuttle sprint for time

On the same field that the handstand walk, the athletes ran one-third of the way down and back, two-thirds of the way down and back and then all the way down and back. Tia Toomey and Roy Gamboa won.

==== Event 13: The Plow ====
- 560 foot plow drag (235 pounds for men, 190 pounds for women)

Garret Fisher and Katrín Davíðsdóttir won. Davíðsdóttir had to be helped off the field after collapsing at the finish line, but she took over the lead from Toomey after this event.

==== Event 14: The Rope Chipper ====
- 200m SkiErg
- 50 doubles unders for men, 40 for women
- 200m row
- 50 double unders for men, 40 for women
- 0.4 mile Assault AirBike
- 50 double unders for men, 40 for women
- 200 m row
- 50 double unders for men, 40 for women
- 200m SkiErg
- 90 foot sled pull (310 pounds for men, 220 for women)

Anna Tunnicliffe and Brent Fikowski won.

==== Event 15: Redemption ====
- 3 peg board ascents
- 21 thrusters
- 2 peg board ascent
- 15 thrusters
- 1 peg board ascent
- 9 thrusters

The event featured the return appearance of the peg board ascents that premiered one year earlier. Many competitors failed to complete the peg board ascents in the previous year, hence, the name of this event being "Redemption." A thruster in CrossFit is a combination of a front squat and push press in one continuous movement and the weights were 135-pounds for the men and 85-pounds for the women. Zak Carchedi and Alexis Johnson won.

Mat Fraser won the competition with a 197-point lead over Ben Smith, the biggest margin of victory in the history of the Games thus far. Katrín Tanja Davíðsdóttir defended her 2015 title with a narrow win over Tia-Clair Toomey to become a repeat champion in the women's competition. Patrick Vellner was the rookie of the year.

== Team events ==
- Team Murph
- Buddy Swim
- Triple Deadlift
- Climbing Worm
- Worm Sprint
- Triple Double
- Berm Bok
- Sprint Relay
- Double-Slug Bob
- Finals

== Podium finishers ==
=== Individuals and teams ===
Place	Men	Women	Team
1st	Mathew Fraser	Katrín Tanja Davíðsdóttir	CrossFit Mayhem Freedom
2nd	Ben Smith	Tia-Clair Toomey	12 Labours CrossFit
3rd	Patrick Vellner	Ragnheiður Sara Sigmundsdottir	CrossFit Yas

=== Masters men ===
Place	40-44	45-49	50-54	55-59	60+
1st	Shawn Ramirez	Ron Mathews	Ron Ortiz	Will Powell	David Hippensteel
2nd	Mike Kern	Brent Maier	Marco Casali	Christian Galy	Stephen Angove
3rd	Jason Uberuaga	Robert Davis (Note: Scott Jones originally finished third in the 45-49 division but was later disqualified for testing positive for anastrozole. Davis was moved up one position.)	Dion Walmsley	David Gantz	Bob Caslin

=== Masters women ===
Place	40-44	45-49	50-54	55-59	60+
1st	Helen Harding	Cheryl Brost	Shellie Edington	Mary Beth Prodromides	Shaun Havard
2nd	Annie Sakamoto	Tracy Shuford	Susan Habbe	Blanca Williams	Lidia Beer
3rd	Janet Black	Tonia Osborne	Diane Stuart	Lynne Knapman	Shelley Noyce

=== Teens ===
Place	14-15 Boys	14-15 Girls	16-17 Boys	16-17 Girls
1st	Vincent Ramirez	Kaela Stephano	Nicholas Paladino	Allison Weiss
2nd	Zach Mayer	Haley Adams	George Sterner	Alexis Raptis
3rd	Tim Pearson	Clara Allen	Angelo DiCicco	Gabriela Migala

== Guns controversy ==
In 2016, CrossFit announced that winners of the 2016 Games would receive Glock handguns as prizes, which resulted in a backlash from some CrossFit members and other sponsors. The Facebook post announcing the decision attracted more than 4,000 comments, with many members drawing attention to the recent spate of mass shootings in the US. One Facebook user wrote "As a reward for fitness you can potentially shoot people?...After the worst mass shootings in USA, I hardly feel bringing a community together via guns is in the spirit of Crossfit. Shameful." Title sponsor Reebok said in a statement: "While we understand CrossFit’s foundations are tied to military and first responders, we do not agree with this decision, particularly in light of current events in the United States." A Change.org petition gathered more than 19,000 signatures against the partnership with Glock. In response to the criticism, director of the games, Dave Castro said, “I am one of millions of people in the U.S. who own guns for recreational and legal purposes. I compete in competitive shooting events, and I have a lot of friends in the shooting industry. Glock offered up pistols as prizes, I agreed to it.” Castro later added, “Unless the state and federal laws regarding gun ownership in California and the U.S. change in the next week, then no, nothing is changing.”

== See also ==
- CrossFit
