= Mallory O'Brien =

Mallory O'Brien may refer to:

- Mallory O'Brien, a fictional character in TV show The West Wing
- Mal O'Brien, CrossFit athlete
