= Anníe Mist Þórisdóttir =

Icelandic CrossFit athlete

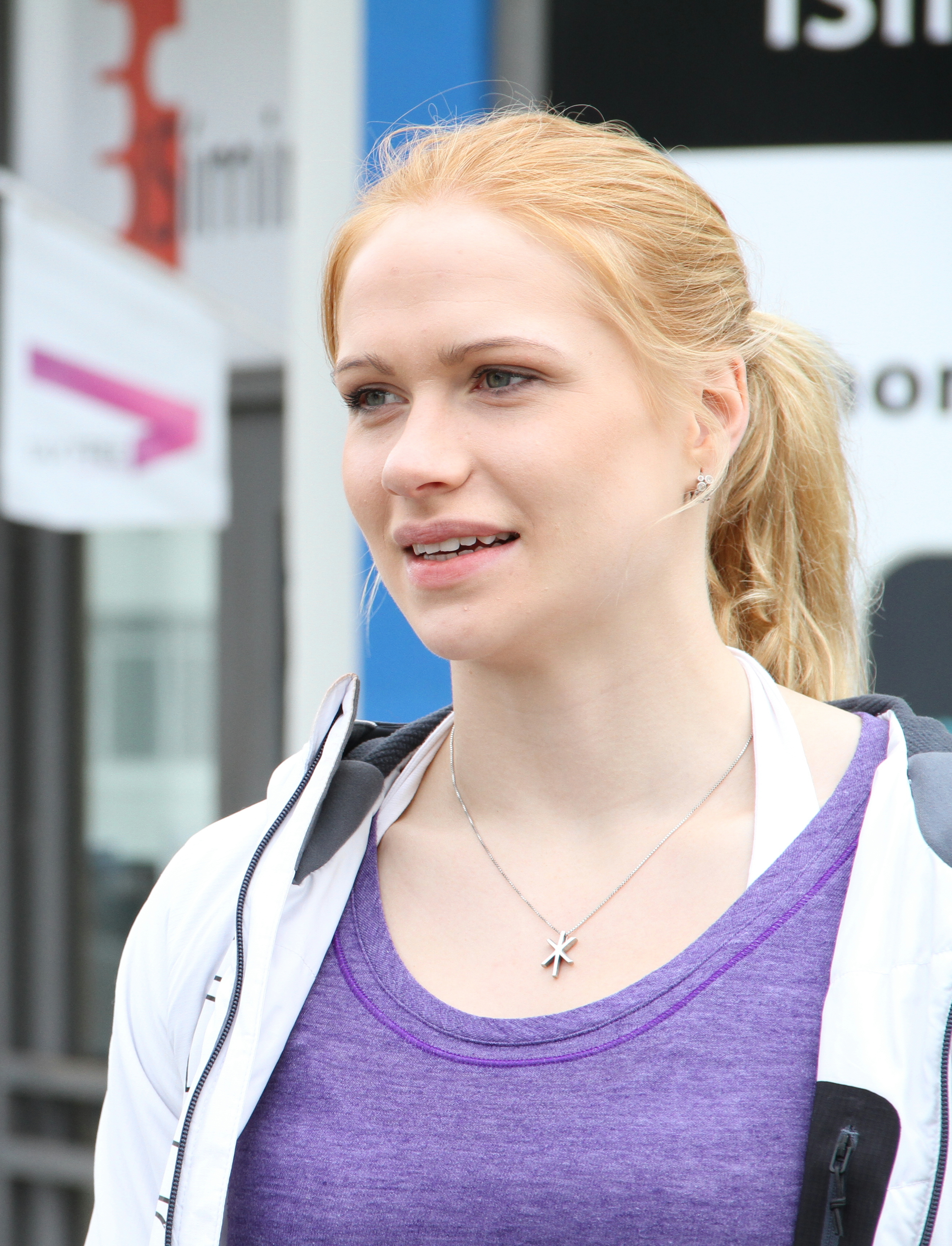

Personal information
- Nicknames: Iceland Annie; Thor's Daughter
- Born: 18 September 1989 (age 36) Reykjavík, Iceland
- Occupation: CrossFit athlete
- Years active: 2009–present
- Height: 5 ft 7 in (1.70 m)
- Weight: 148 lb (67 kg)
- Life partner: Frederik Aegidius

Sport
- Sport: CrossFit, Olympic weightlifting
- Club: Reebok CrossFit Reykjavik
- Coached by: Jami Tikkanen

Achievements and titles
- World finals: Twice CrossFit Games champion ('11, '12); Twice CrossFit Games silver medalist ('10, '14); CrossFit Games bronze medalist ('17, ‘21)
- Regional finals: Twice Open worldwide champion ('11, '15); 5-times Europe Regional champion ('10, '11, '12, '14, '18); 10-times CrossFit Games qualifier ('09, '10, '11, '12, '14, '15, '16, '17, '18, '19)
- Personal bests: Backsquat: 276 lb (125 kg); Clean and Jerk: 238 lb (108 kg); Snatch: 203 lb (92 kg); Deadlift: 375 lb (170 kg); Fran 2:37; Grace 1:20; Filthy 50 15:07; Isabel 1:29; Elizabeth 4:24; Randy 2:29; Diane 1:54

Anníe Mist Þórisdóttir (given as Annie Thorisdottir in international media) is a professional CrossFit athlete from Reykjavík, Iceland. She is the co-owner of Crossfit Reykjavik, where she also coaches and trains.

Anníe is the first woman to win the CrossFit Games twice (in 2011 and 2012). She placed second in the 2010 and 2014 CrossFit Games. She did not compete in 2013 due to injury, and dropped out of the 2015 CrossFit Games early due to heat stroke. She placed third in the 2017 and 2021 CrossFit Games.

Anníe trains four hours per day, six days per week, and also has experience as a gymnast (eight years), ballet dancer (two years), and pole vaulter (two years). She is 170 cm (5 ft 7 in) tall, weighs approximately 67 kg (148 lb), and hopes to go into the medical field. She has one daughter, Freyja, born August 2020 and one son, Atlas, born May 2024.

== CrossFit Games career ==
Anníe first appeared in the sport of CrossFit in July 2009, when she travelled from Reykjavik to Aromas, California to compete at the third annual CrossFit Games. She had been taking "bootcamp" classes but had only a month of CrossFit experience. Anníe finished five of the eight events within the top 10 (out of 70 competitors), including an event win on the Sandbag Sprint (1:07.4) and fourth-place finishes on the Sledge Hammer Drive (5:56) and the Triplet (86). On the final day of competition, an event called "The Chipper" was announced that included ring muscle-ups. With no exposure to this men's gymnastics movement, Anníe attempted to learn the movement before going out on the competition floor with the help of coaches and fellow athletes to no avail. On the competition floor, Anníe completed the 15 cleans (100-lb.), 30 toes-to-bar, and 30 box jumps (20 inches) before reaching the 15 muscle-ups. She attempted the muscle-up many times unsuccessfully before finally getting one rep in front of the cheering crowds. She earned a DNF on the event, and dropped in the overall standings to 11th, but made herself known as a contender for the title of "Fittest on Earth."

=== 2010: Runner-up ===
In 2010, the Games had moved from Aromas, California, to the Home Depot Center in Carson, California. After the 2010 Europe Regional, she picked up a coach, Jami Tikkanen, and worked on competition strategy. The 2010 Games went down as a competition between Kristan Clever and Anníe. Clever accumulated five event wins and three 2nd-place finishes to Anníe's four event wins, one 2nd, and one third. Anníe could now do muscle-ups, which was important since that skill/strength was thoroughly tested in the opening event, "Amanda" (a workout consisting of 9-7-5 repetitions of muscle-ups and 95-lb. snatches), where she took 12th with a time of 12:07. Once again, Anníe excelled at grunt work with sandbags winning the "Sandbag Move," and won other events such as "Pyramid Double Helen," "Deadlift/Pistol/Double-under," and "Wall Burpee/Rope Climb." She finished the Games in second place behind Clever.

=== 2011–12: Champion ===
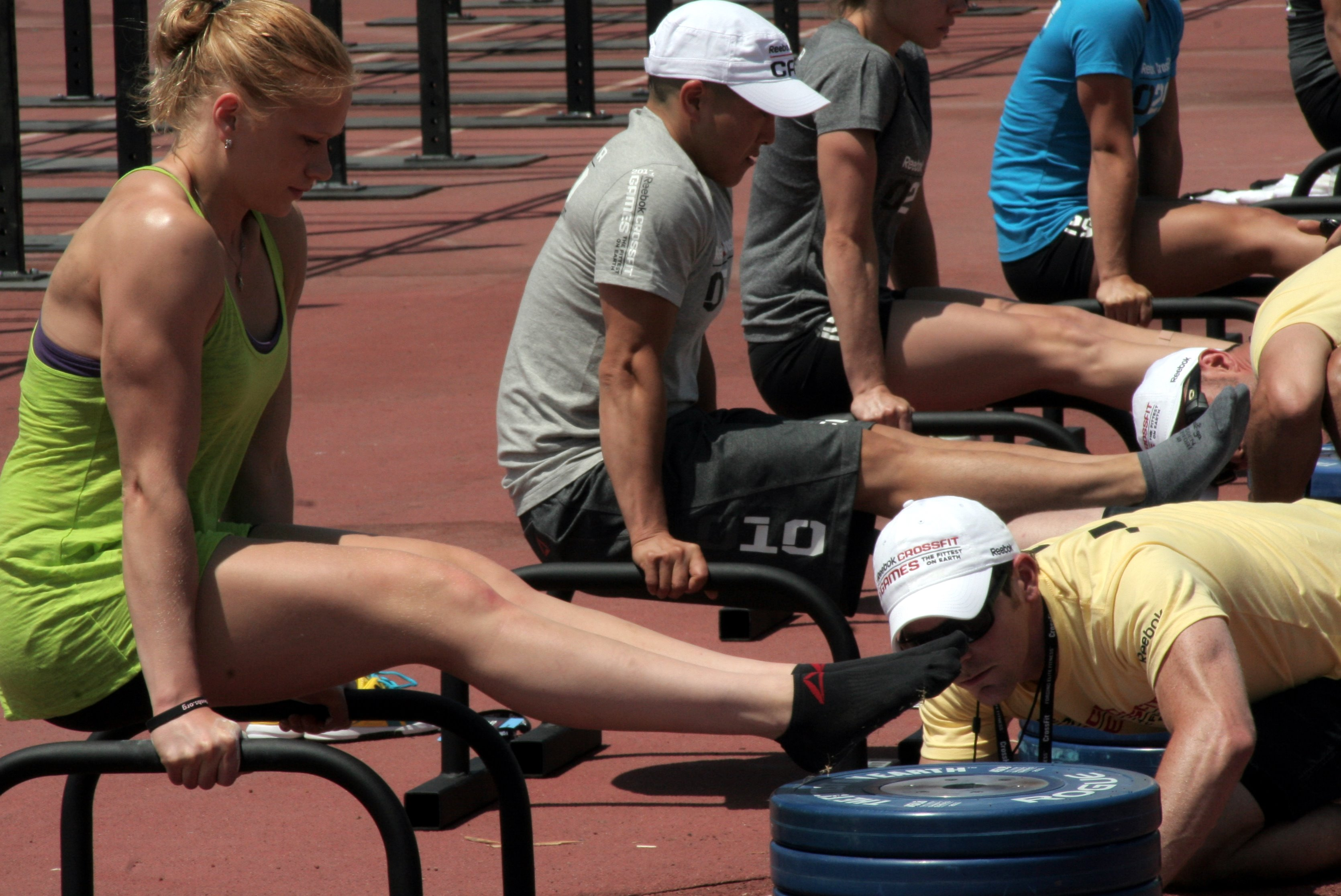
Anníe Þórisdóttir during the Skills Test at the 2011 Games.

At the 2011 CrossFit Games, Anníe was dominant. She won every stage of the CrossFit Games season beginning with the inaugural worldwide Open (1st, worldwide), and continuing through the Europe Regional and the Games. Anníe surpassed 2010 Games champion Kristan Clever by a margin of 43 points thanks to top 5 finishes on 8 of the 10 events, including three event wins (Rope/Clean, Skills 2, Dog-Sled) and four third-place finishes (Killer Kage, The End 1, The End 2, The End 3). Anníe shared the podium with Clever (2nd overall) and Rebecca Voigt (3rd overall).

In 2012, Anníe and Rich Froning Jr. became the first athletes to win the CrossFit Games twice.

=== 2013–14: Injury and second place finish ===
In 2013, Anníe was not able to defend her title due to a back injury (a herniated disc) sustained while too casually lifting heavy weight. She withdrew during the third week of the five-week Open. At the time, she said she could not do basic movements like squatting without weight. She questioned whether she could ever walk again and spent the rest of the year recovering.

She entered the 2014 season notably less confident than she had appeared in past seasons. In her first live competitive appearance since her injury, Open Announcement 14.5 in San Francisco, Anníe trailed far behind the other champions, Sam Briggs, Rich Froning, Jason Khalipa, and Graham Holmberg, and received the high-fives of her competitors at the end of the workout while shaking her head in apparent disappointment. Any athlete that thought there was blood in the water was proven wrong in the next two stages of the season, however. Anníe went on to win the 2014 Europe Regional, while 2013 Games champion Sam Briggs of England failed to qualify (4th overall) due to a poor performance on the max distance handstand walk. At the 2014 Games, Anníe had a slow start with event finishes in the teens and 20s, but as the weekend progressed Anníe appeared to have lost her hesitancy and guarding, as she bagged top 10 finishes including 1st - 2nd - 1st on the final three events.

=== 2015–19 ===
In 2015, she won the worldwide Open for a second time before taking a third at the new, combined Meridian Regional (the top 30 athletes from Europe and top 10 from Africa competed together in Copenhagen for five qualifying spots to the Games). This was her lowest Regional finish to date, as the four-time Europe Regional champion.

In the third event of the 2015 Games, Murph (1 mile run, 100 pull-ups, 200 push-ups, 300 air squats, 1 mile run all completed with a weighted vest), Anníe suffered from heat stroke. She tried to continue to compete, but decided to withdraw before the final three events on Sunday. Even so, two of the three women who finished on the podium, champion Katrin Davidsdottir and Sara Sigmundsdottir in third place, were Icelandic (the third-place finisher in the men's individual competition, Björgvin Karl Guðmundsson, is also from Iceland).

Anníe competed each year from 2016 to 2019, including a 3rd-place finish at the 2017 Games, earning her 5th podium finish at the time, with 2 previous 2nd-place finishes (2010 and 2014) and 2 championships (2011 and 2012).

=== 2020-2021: Pregnancy and return to podium ===
In 2020, Anníe competed in the worldwide Open while pregnant (though she didn't know at the time), and announced her pregnancy just a few weeks after the close of the Open. She took the rest of the 2020 season off, but returned to competition for the 2021 season and finished 3rd at the Games. Anníe has become the first woman to get back to the podium at the CrossFit Games within a year of giving birth (August 11, 2020 and August 1, 2021, respectively).

=== 2022: Team competition ===
For the 2022 CrossFit Games, Anníe teamed up with Khan Porter, Lauren Fisher and Tola Morakinyo to compete as Team CrossFit Reykjavik. Although the team was widely expected to be a podium contender, due to an unexpected injury to Fisher, the team was only able to finish fourth at the Games.

== Other athletic accomplishments ==
Anníe placed first for women at the 2013 Dubai Fitness Competition, taking away more than Dh650,000 ($177,000) in prize money. Anníe also got on the podium Dubai Fitness Competition 2016 and came back in 2017 to take 1st place. She defeated NFL running back Justin Forsett in a push-up contest while returning from a back injury. Anníe competed in the D group of the International Weightlifting Federation 2015 World Weightlifting Championships in the 69 kg weight class. She lifted 88 kg in the Snatch and 108 kg in the Clean & Jerk for a final total of 196 kg placing 33th at a bodyweight of 68.05 kg.

== Personal life ==
Anníe has been in a relationship with fellow CrossFit athlete Frederik Ægidius (often written as Aegidius) from Denmark since 2012. On August 11, 2020, Anníe gave birth to the couple's daughter, Freyja Mist Ægidius Frederiksdottir. Anníe has written candidly about her experience with and recovery from postpartum depression. On May 1, 2024, Anníe gave birth to the couple's second child, a boy named Atlas Týr Ægidius Frederiksson. Source: Instagram.

== CrossFit Games results ==
Year	Games	Regionals		Open
2009	11th	1st (Iceland)		
2010	2nd	1st (Europe)		
2011	1st	1st (Europe)		1st (World)
2012	1st	1st (Europe)		3rd (World)
2013	Did not compete (injury)			
2014	2nd	1st (Europe)		28th (World)
2015	38th*	3rd (Meridian)		1st (World)
2016	13th	2nd (Meridian)		10th (World)
2017	3rd	3rd (Meridian)		7th (World)
2018	5th	1st (Europe)		5th (World)
Year	Games	Sanctional		Open
2019	11th	N/A (qualified through open)		2nd
2020	Did not compete (pregnancy)			2nd
Year	Games	Semifinal	Quarterfinal	Open
2021	3rd	3rd (Lowlands Throwdown)	39th (World); 9th (Europe)	118th (World); 37th (Europe)
2022	4th (Team Reykjavik)	1st (Lowlands Throwdown) (Team Reykjavik)	12th Team (World); 4th Team (Europe)	18th Individual (World); 6th (Europe)
2023	13th	2nd (Europe)	18th (World); 6th (Europe)	54th (World); 16th (Europe)

*Withdrew

== Weightlifting Achievements ==
Year	Venue	Weight	Snatch (kg)				Clean & Jerk (kg)				Total	Rank
Year	Venue	Weight	1	2	3	Rank	1	2	3	Rank	Total	Rank
World Championships
2015	Houston, United States	69 kg	78	84	88	37	100	105	108	32	196	33
