= 2019 CrossFit Games =

Athletic competition

- Venue: Alliant Energy Center
- Location: Madison, Wisconsin
- Dates: August 1–4, 2019

Champions
- Men: (United States) Mat Fraser
- Women: (Australia) Tia-Clair Toomey
- Team: CrossFit Mayhem Freedom

The 2019 CrossFit Games was the 13th iteration of the annual competition in the sport CrossFit held from August 1–4, 2019, at the Alliant Energy Center in Madison, Wisconsin, United States. The men's competition was won by Mat Fraser, the women's by Tia-Clair Toomey, and CrossFit Mayhem Freedom won the Team competition, all of whom also won the 2018 games.

The 2019 Games operated under a new set of qualification rules this year, allowing athletes to qualify for the Games via three different methods: the Open, the Sanctionals and invitations, replacing the Regionals of previous seasons. It was also the first year to allow a team to be composed of members who did not share a gym affiliation, thereby removing the Affiliate Cup. This year the Games was not broadcast on ESPN or CBS, but rather streamed online by various partners using an open-source broadcast.

This year's Games was the largest yet in the Games' history with the introduction of national champions from 114 countries who can qualify for the Games. The field, however, was quickly reduced to 10 men and 10 women in a series of cuts. Toomey put in a dominant display to win the women's compeitin by 195 points over Kristin Holte. The men's competition was tightly fought between Fraser and Noah Ohlsen, with Ohlsen leading in many events and Fraser only pulling ahead to win in the final two events. Fraser's fourth consecutive win equaled Rich Froning Jr.'s record, while Toomey's win was the first time a woman has achieved three consecutive wins.

== Qualification ==
For this season, the Games qualification procedures were overhauled. For the first year since 2008, the CrossFit Games no longer hosted a regional qualifier and instead sanctioned independently run events around the world. The events were trademarked as "Sanctionals" by CrossFit, and were used to qualify participants in the Men, Women, and Team divisions for the 2019 Games. In previous years the CrossFit Open was used to determine which athletes and teams qualified for the Regionals. In 2019, each Sanctional was either by invitation or through its own open qualification process. The CrossFit Open still occurred, but was used to qualify directly to the Games. Team rules were also changed so that members no longer needed to be from the same CrossFit affiliate and a team can be composed of the best athletes from different affiliates (hence dubbed the "superteam"), there was therefore also no Affiliate Cup which was awarded to an affiliate in previous year.

Individual athletes qualified for the 2019 CrossFit Games in one of four ways by order of precedence: becoming a national champion in the 2019 CrossFit Open, finishing in the top 20 men or women worldwide in the Open, winning a Sanctionals event, or by select invitation at the Games' discretion.

=== Open ===
The first set of qualified athletes were the men or women who finished top 20 worldwide in the Open, as well as the top-ranked man and woman in the Open from each country with at least one CrossFit affiliate in good standing, and who had completed each Open workout as written in the Rx'd (prescribed) category after video review. 357,000 athletes registered for the Open, a drop of 14% from the 2018 Games. The Open took place over five weeks starting on February 21; after the Open was completed, a total of 123 men and 117 women qualified for the Games as national champions pending final review. After the national champions were determined, the next 20 overall male and female worldwide finishers in the Open qualified for the Games. Mat Fraser and Sara Sigmundsdóttir were the overall winners of the Open.

=== Sanctionals ===
The 2019 Sanctionals consisted of 15 sanctioned events that took place between December 2018 and June 2019. The events were the Dubai CrossFit Championship (Dubai), Australian CrossFit Championship (Broadbeach), Wodapalooza (Miami), CrossFit Fittest in Cape Town, CrossFit Strength in Depth (London), Asia CrossFit Championship (Shanghai), Mid-Atlantic CrossFit Challenge (Baltimore), CrossFit Italian Showdown (Milan), Brazil CrossFit Championship (São Paulo), CrossFit Lowlands Throwdown (Apeldoorn), Down Under CrossFit Championship (Wollongong), Reykjavik CrossFit Championship (Reykjavík), Rogue Invitational (Columbus, Ohio), CrossFit French Throwdown (Paris), and the Granite Games (St. Cloud, Minnesota).

Unlike the Regionals of previous years where the events were standardised, each Sanctional devised its own separate workouts, which may vary in number from six to twelve workouts. The male, female, and team winners of each of the events qualified for the Games and if a Sanctionals event winner has previously qualified for the 2019 CrossFit Games, the qualifying place for that competition would be awarded to the next highest finisher who has yet to qualify for the games.

=== Invitations ===
The final method of qualification allowed for the CrossFit Games to issue four at-large bids. No other details were provided by the CrossFit Games rulebook, but invitations were given to professional obstacle course racer Hunter McIntyre and ten-time CrossFit Games competitor Ben Smith following social media campaigns.

== Individual ==
Following the qualification procedure, there were 148 men and 134 women that had qualified for the CrossFit Games in the Individual competition (143 men and 117 women turned up at the Games). In the previous 4 Games, no athletes were cut during the competition; this year due to the significantly higher number of participants, the Games implemented cuts after each of the first 6 events. The field was cut to 75 competitors after the first event, and 50 competitors after the second. 10 athletes were then cut for each subsequent event until only 10 remained after the Sprint Course on Saturday. The scoring for each event was adjusted after the cuts so that there would be greater point difference in later events than in the earlier events (wins were therefore more advantageous in later events). The drastic nature of the cuts and how early the athletes were cut proved controversial as many podium finishers of previous Games such as Sara Sigmundsdottir, Samantha Briggs, Annie Thorisdottir, Patrick Vellner, Brent Fikowski, and Ben Smith failed to reach the later stages of the competition.

=== Thursday, August 1, 2019 ===
==== Event 1: First Cut ====
Four rounds for time of:

- 400-meter run
- Three legless rope climbs
- Seven squat snatches

The snatch weight for the event was 185 pounds (84 kilograms) for men and 130 pounds (59 kilograms) for women. The event was won by both defending champions, Mat Fraser and Tia-Clair Toomey.

==== Event 2: Second Cut ====
As fast as possible, each competitor accumulated 800 meters on a rowing machine, then lifted two kettlebells from the shoulder to overhead for 66 repetitions, and then finished with 132 feet (40 meters) of handstand walking. The weight of each kettlebell was 16 kilograms (35 pounds) for the men and 12 kilograms (26 pounds) for the women. Fraser won the men's event again, while Danielle Brandon won the women's side.

=== Friday, August 2, 2019 ===
==== Event 3: Ruck ====
Competitors ran four laps around a 1,500-meter (4,900-foot) course carrying a weighted rucksack. The weight increased by 10 pounds (4.5 kilograms) each lap, from 20 pounds on the first lap to 50 pounds on the last. Lukas Högberg and Emily Rolfe won the event. A bag fell out of Mat Fraser's rucksack near the end of the 6 km run without his being aware of it, which led to a penalty of 60 seconds, dropping his position in the event from 6th to 17th.

==== Event 4: Sprint Couplet ====
- 172-foot (52-meter) sled push
- Bar muscle-ups; 18 for men and 15 for women
- 172-foot (52-meter) sled push

The competitors started the event by pushing a sled, then completing the required number of muscle-ups on a pull-up bar, and then finished with another sled push to the finish line. The event was won by Matt McLeod and Amanda Barnhart.

==== Event 5: Mary ====
As many repetitions as possible in 20 minutes of:

- Five handstand push-ups
- Ten alternating single-leg squats
- Fifteen pull-ups

A traditional CrossFit workout, the competitors performed five handstand push-ups, then ten squats, followed by fifteen pull-ups. After the pull-ups, they started back at the handstand push-ups and repeated the order until the 20 minute mark. The event was won by Noah Ohlsen, who took the overall lead from Mat Fraser with this win, and Kari Pearce.

=== Saturday, August 3, 2019 ===
==== Event 6: Sprint Course ====
Three-round bracket elimination sprint course. In heats of five, competitors ran through a course. The top ten in the first round advanced to the second round, and then the top five in the second round moved on to the final run. Saxon Panchick and Kristin Holte won the event.

Following the event, only the final ten competitors participated in the remainder of the competition.

==== Event 7: Split Triplet ====
Five rounds as fast as possible of:

- Peg board ascent
- 100 double-unders
- 10 single-arm dumbbell split snatches
- 10 single-arm dumbbell clean and split jerks

The dumbbell weight was 80 pounds (36 kilograms) for the men 55 pounds (25 kilograms) for the women. Mat Fraser and Tia-Clair Toomey won the event.

==== Event 8: Clean ====
The event consisted of progressively heavier weights that each competitor must clean. The men started at 315 pounds (143 kilograms) and the women started at 215 pounds (98 kilograms). If multiple athlete failed to complete a lift at the same weight, they went to a tie-breaker bar, where they then cleaned 295 pounds (134 kilograms) for men and 195 pounds (88 kilograms) for women five times. The time to complete the five lifts and run to a finish line was the tie-breaker score. The event was again won by defending champions Mat Fraser and Tia-Clair Toomey, with a 380-pound (170-kilogram) and 265-pound (120-kilogram) clean, respectively.

=== Sunday, August 4, 2019 ===
==== Event 9: Swim Paddle ====
A 1,000-meter (3,300-foot) swim to a buoy in Lake Monona and back to shore, then immediately grabbing a paddleboard for a 1,000-meter paddle on the same course. The event was won by Matt McLeod and Tia-Clair Toomey.

==== Events 10 and 11: Ringer 1 and 2 ====
Ringer 1

- Air Bike for 30 calories
- 30 toes-to-rings
- Air bike for 20 calories
- 20 toes-to-rings
- Air bike for 10 calories
- 10 toes-to-rings

Ringer 2

- 15 burpees to ring touch
- 15 overhead squats
- 10 burpees to ring touch
- 10 overhead squats
- 5 burpees to ring touch
- 5 overhead squats

Ringer 1 and Ringer 2 were separately scored events, with Ringer 2 starting seven minutes after the start of Ringer 1 (time-capped 6 minutes). In Ringer 1, the competitors alternated between riding an air-resistance stationary bicycle and repetitions of hanging from gymnastic rings and touching their toes to the rings. In Ringer 2, the athletes alternated between completing burpees and jumping up to touch the rings as a target and overhead squats with a barbell. The men's weight on the barbell was 135 pounds (61 kilograms) and the women's was 95 pounds (43 kilograms). Katrín Davíðsdóttir won both women's events, while James Newbury won Ringer 1 and Mat Fraser won Ringer 2 for the men. Fraser retook the overall lead from Ohlsen by 25 points after his win.

==== Event 12: The Standard ====
- 30 clean and jerks
- 30 ring muscle-ups
- 30 snatches

For the final event, a combination of three standard CrossFit workouts were done back-to-back-to-back: "Grace" (30 clean and jerks), muscle-ups, and "Isabel" (30 snatches). The weight for both barbell movements was 135 pounds (61 kilograms) and 95 pounds (43 kilograms) for the men and women, respectively. The event was won both Mat Fraser and Tia-Clair Toomey, who also both repeated as CrossFit Games champions.

== Team events ==
Teams were cut to 11 after Strongman's Fear, 9 after Sprint Relay, 7 after Big Chipper, 5 after Swim Paddle.

- Assault to Bob
- Rope Worm
- Clean and Jerk
- Team Ruck
- Team Strongman's Fear
- Sprint Relay
- Big Chipper
- Team Swim Paddle
- The Trio

== Podium finishers ==
=== Individuals and teams ===
Place	Men	Women	Team
1st	(United States) Mathew Fraser	(Australia) Tia-Clair Toomey	CrossFit Mayhem Freedom
2nd	(United States) Noah Ohlsen	(Norway) Kristin Holte	CrossFit Krypton
3rd	(Iceland) Björgvin Karl Guðmundsson	(New Zealand) Jamie Greene	Invictus

=== Masters men ===
Place	35–39	40–44	45–49	50–54	55–59	60+
1st	(United States) Nick Urankar	(United States) Jason Grubb	(United States) Joel Hughes	(United States) Kevin Koester	(United States) Joe Ames	(United States) Gord MacKinnon (Note: Paul Perna originally finished first but was later disqualified for testing positive for banned performance-enhancing substances. MacKinnon, Brannagan, and Giuffre each moved up a position.)
2nd	(United States) Jordan Troyan	(United Kingdom) Richard Vint	(United States) Justin Lasala	(United States) Gregg Geerdes	(United States) Ken Idler	(Canada) Dan Brannagan
3rd	(Iceland) Sigurður Þrastarson	(Canada) Caine Hayes (Note: Robbie Perovich originally finished third but later disqualified for testing positive for banned performance-enhancing substances. Haynes was moved up one position from fourth place.)	(United States) Chad Augustin	(United States) Vic McQuaide	(United States) Allen Duarte	(Canada) Carl Giuffre

=== Masters women ===
Place	35–39	40–44	45–49	50–54	55–59	60+
1st	(United States) Anna Tobias	(United States) Joey Kimdon	(United States) Janet Black	(United States) Jana Slyder	(Canada) Laurie Meschishnick	(Canada) Susan Clarke
2nd	(United States) Carleen Mathews	(United Kingdom) Kelly Friel	(United States) Semma Burba	(United States) Chris Nelson	(United States) Linda Elstun	(Canada) Patricia McGill
3rd	(United States) Becca Voight Miller	(Canada) Deanna Posey	(Canada) Jolaine Undershute	(Canada) Joyanne Cooper	(United States) April Watkins (Note: Marion Valkenburg originally finished third but was later disqualified for testing positive for banned performance-enhancing substances. Watkins finished in fifth but was moved up to third as fourth place finisher Hylie Thompson had also previously failed a drug test.)	(New Zealand) Pauline Sciascia

=== Teens ===
Place	14–15 Boys	14–15 Girls	16–17 Boys	16–17 Girls
1st	(United States) David Bradley	(United States) Emma Cary	(United States) Dallin Pepper	(United States) Chloe Smith
2nd	(Venezuela) Amato Mazzocca	(United States) Gigi Sabatini	(Slovakia) Matúš Kočar	(United States) Sophia Grimmer
3rd	(Iceland) Brynjar Ari Magnússon	(Canada) Emma Lawson	(United States) Tudor Magda	(United States) Paige Powers
