= Mat Fraser (athlete) =

American professional CrossFit athlete

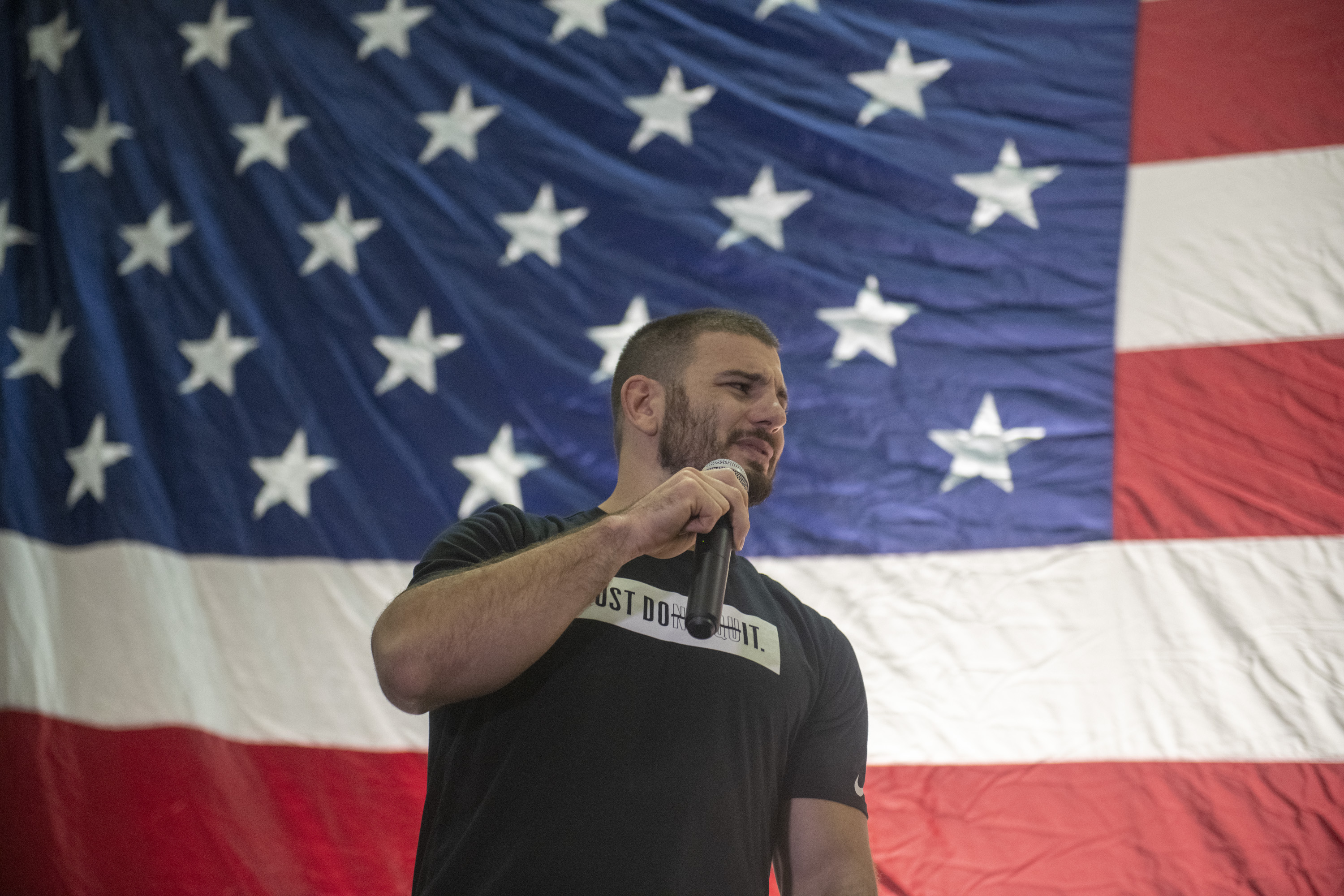

Personal information
- Born: Mathew Edward Fraser; January 25, 1990 (age 36) Kingston, Ontario, Canada
- Education: University of Vermont
- Occupation: CrossFit Athlete
- Height: 5 ft 6 in (168 cm)
- Weight: 195 lb (88 kg)
- Website: mathewfras

Sport
- Sport: CrossFit
Medal record
CrossFit Games
Gold medal – first place	2016	Men
Gold medal – first place	2017	Men
Gold medal – first place	2018	Men
Gold medal – first place	2019	Men
Gold medal – first place	2020	Men
Silver medal – second place	2014	Men
Silver medal – second place	2015	Men
Rogue Invitational
Gold medal – first place	2019	Men

Mathew Edward Fraser (born 1990) is a retired American professional CrossFit athlete, competing from 2014 to 2020. Fraser is the first athlete to have won five CrossFit Games titles, winning the 2016, 2017, 2018, 2019, and 2020 CrossFit Games consecutively. He is widely considered to be the most dominant and successful individual male athlete in the sport of CrossFit.

Fraser has a background in Olympic weightlifting and was a junior national champion. He made his debut at the 2014 CrossFit Games and took second place after a strong performance. He was a favorite to win in 2015 with the retirement of four-time defending champion Rich Froning Jr., but was edged out in the final event by Ben Smith. The following year, Fraser took first place by a record margin, and won all the following four CrossFit Games. The 2020 Games were his final Games, which he won with a greatly extended record margin of victory of 545 points, and set a record of five consecutive championships wins.

== Early life ==
Mat Fraser was born to Canadian Olympic figure skaters Don Fraser and Candace Jones in Kingston, Ontario, Canada, and spent his early childhood in Sharbot Lake. His mother worked as a doctor while his father was a stay-at-home dad. The family moved to Colchester, Vermont, in the United States in his early childhood. He was athletic from a young age, learning to swim when he was one, water-ski at 18 months, downhill ski at two, and walk on hands for a dozen paces when he was seven. He played football in middle school and took up weightlifting when he was 12 years old. After graduating from Colchester High School, he started to train full time in Olympic weightlifting at the Olympic Training Center in Colorado Springs, Colorado, as a resident athlete on scholarship.

In 2009, a few weeks before he was due to compete in the Junior World Weightlifting Championship in Bucharest, Romania, he injured his back doing a clean-pull, which was further damaged in a squat after he was encouraged to train a week later. Although in pain, he went to compete in the Championships, but after returning home it was found that he had suffered two breaks in his L5 vertebra. It required him to wear a plastic brace on his torso for four months, but it failed to heal properly. He refused spinal fusion surgery because it would have ended his athletic career, and elected instead for experimental surgery to have his back re-broken, inserting a protein sponge to help heal the bone with two plates and six screws attached to his lower spine. The rehabilitation lasted a year, although he resumed training after four months.

After his surgery, Fraser enrolled at the Olympic Education Center at Northern Michigan University to study math and physics while he was on his rehabilitation. He gave up weightlifting as a sport after two years in Michigan, and went to Rocky Mountain House in Alberta to work on the oil fields for four months, before returning to Vermont to start a double major course in mechanical engineering and business and a double minor in math and engineering management at the University of Vermont in Burlington. Fraser started training in a CrossFit gym when he was 22, and competed in CrossFit events in 2013, but initially, he competed only to earn some pocket money while he was studying. Although he had originally intended to pursue a career in engineering, a stint as a summer intern in an aerospace company in 2014 convinced him to focus on CrossFit. By the time he graduated with degrees in engineering and business in May 2016, he had established himself enough as a CrossFit athlete to commit to the sport full time.

== Career ==
Fraser came from an Olympic weightlifting background where he earned his first national title in weightlifting when he was 13 years old and was the school age champion in 2003, 2005 and 2007. In 2009, he became the junior national champion (77 kg category). He injured his back in 2009, but not knowing that he had a broken vertebra, he went on to compete in the Junior World Weightlifting Championship in Bucharest, Romania, and ended up 15th out of 16 in the 77 kg men category. After spinal surgery and rehabilitation, he competed in two American Weightlifting Open competitions, placing third in the 77 kg men division in 2010, and fifth in 85 kg men in 2011. He was placed 8th in the 85 kg men category at the National Championships in 2012. He retired from the sport after his final competition as funding was cut in 2011 after Chicago lost its bid for 2016 Summer Olympics and he lost interest in weightlifting.

Fraser started training in a CrossFit box (gym) while he was still competing in weightlifting – he was looking for a place to do Olympic lifts to keep himself fit when he was home in Vermont during a school break from Michigan. Although not interested in CrossFit, he chose a CrossFit box (Champlain Valley CrossFit) because CrossFit boxes have the equipment used by Olympic lifters in towns without dedicated Olympic facilities. When he returned to study in Vermont, he also trained at Champlain Valley, where he was introduced to CrossFit as a sport and was encouraged to compete in CrossFit events. Fraser started competing at the end of 2012 and early 2013 in local competitions, and with only a few months of experience in CrossFit, he finished fifth in the CrossFit North East Regionals, which was not high enough to qualify for the CrossFit Games. For a time he also competed as part of a team. He was with the New York Rhinos team in the NPGL in 2014, and in the Built By Bergeron team in 2015, which finished third in the CrossFit Team Series that year.

=== 2014–2015: Runner-up ===
In 2014, Fraser won the North East Regionals, which gained him some attention. In his first appearance at the CrossFit Games, he ended the competition as runner-up to Rich Froning. He had seven top 10 finishes in that year's events, tying for first place with Froning in the Overhead Squat, and finishing second in Midline March and Thick 'N Quick. He also won the Rookie of the Year award.

In 2015, Froning had retired from individual competitions, and Fraser was widely expected to win the 2015 CrossFit Games. Although he started well, he performed poorly in several events during the third day of the competition, particularly in the Soccer Chipper event that he failed to finish but Ben Smith won. Fraser lost his large lead over Smith, which proved decisive in Smith's eventual victory in the competition. Fraser later described his second place as a "devastating loss" and his "biggest failure", a "lesson I will reflect on the rest of my life". He said: "I hated my 2015 medal. To me it just represented the cut corners, the slacking off, the thinking I could out-train a bad diet." He added: "If I had won in 2015 while carrying those bad habits, I would've kept those bad habits. I would've thought I could do this while eating terribly. I can do this while training sporadically."

=== 2016–2020: Champion ===
At the 2016 CrossFit Games, Fraser performed consistently well in events he had previously struggled in. He started his campaign with a win in the 7k Ranch Trail Run even though he was not known for running or endurance. That was the only event he won, but he came second in seven events and top 10 in nearly all events, and the consistent all-round performance allowed him to dominate the field and emerge as the winner. He won with a 197-point lead over second-place Ben Smith, which was the biggest margin of victory in the history of the Games.

The following year Fraser was again dominant at the 2017 CrossFit Games, winning four of the last eight events (Triple-G Chipper, Muscle-up Clean Ladder, Heavy 17.5, 2223 Intervals), the first time he won more than one event in a single Games. He finished in first place, extending his record margin of victory to 216 points over Brent Fikowski. He won the competition despite injuring his LCL on his knee while stretching after the first day of competition; he kept quiet on his injury and continued to compete the next three days.

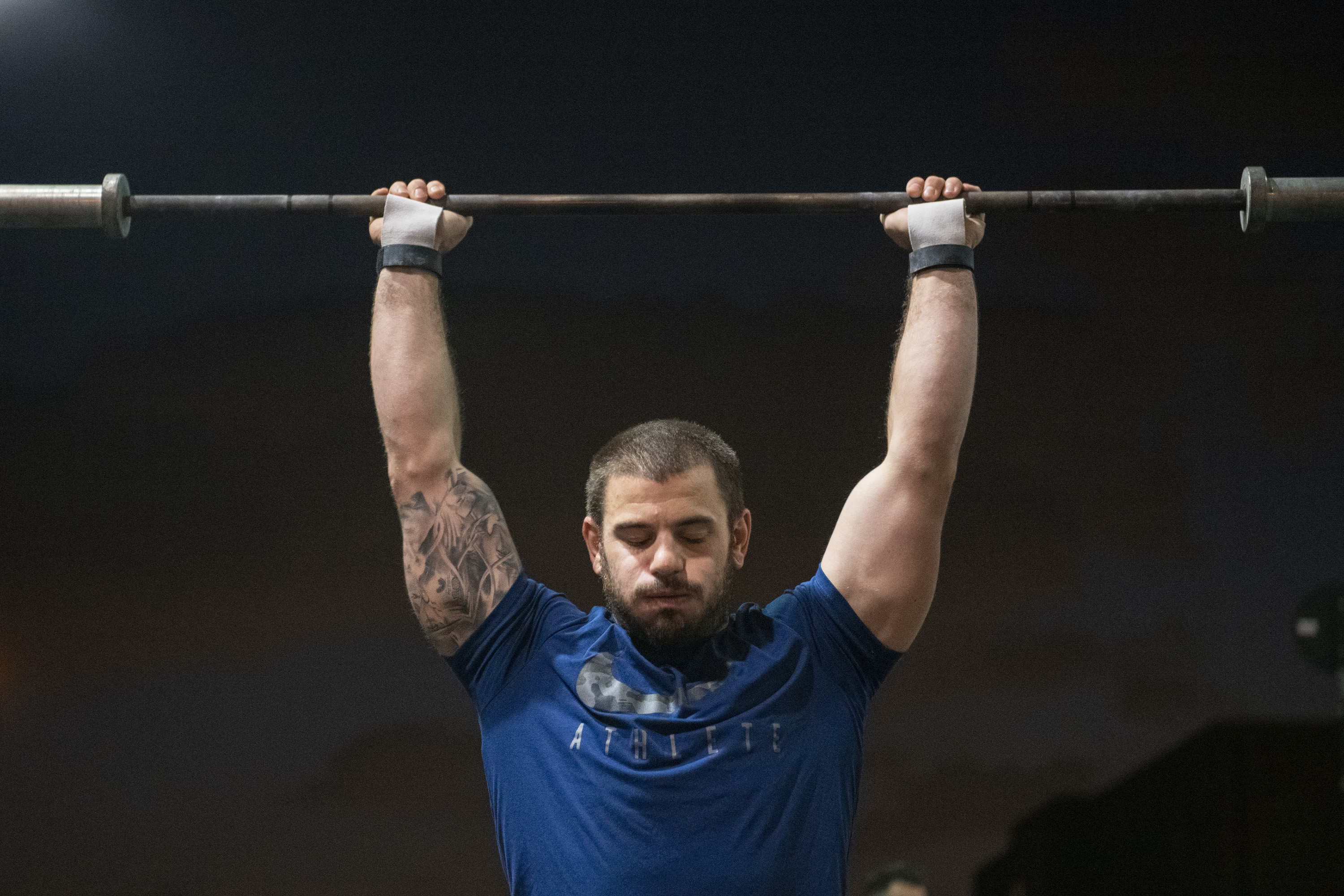
Mat Fraser in 2018

In 2018, Fraser's consistent performance again allowed him to defend his title at the 2018 CrossFit Games. He led from the third event, winning in two events (Fibonacci and Aeneas) with top 4 finishes in 10 of the 14 events and only one outside the top 10 – 11th on the Marathon Row. He won with a record 1,162 points, and a record margin of 220 points over the runner-up Patrick Vellner.

Fraser qualified for the 2019 CrossFit Games by winning the first sanctioned event held in Dubai under the new qualification system. He also won the inaugural Rogue Invitational. At the CrossFit Games itself, Fraser faced a strong challenge from Noah Ohlsen despite winning 6 events in this Games. He started well with two wins, but stumbled on day 2 of the competition and trailed Ohlsen in points by the end of the day – a sandbag falling out of his bag in the 6k Ruck event near the end of the race resulted in a 60-second penalty and a 17th-place finish, followed by a worse 21st finish in Sprint Couplet. Fraser managed to claw back the deficit in the later events of the competition; a couple of first-place finishes (Split Triplet and Clean) and his second and first finishes on Ringer 1 and Ringer 2 in the last day gave him a small lead over Ohlsen. A win in the final event The Standard made him champion for the fourth time, but with the smallest winning margin in men's competition since 2010. This win equaled Froning's record of four consecutive wins.

In 2020, the COVID-19 pandemic forced major changes to the 2020 CrossFit Games. The competition was separated into two stages. In the first stage, 30 men competed online and Fraser won four of the seven events. The field was then narrowed to the top 5 men who competed in person in the final stage. Fraser dominated this much-reduced group of athletes, winning ten of the twelve events and only dropping to second place in Swim 'N' Stuff and CrossFit Total. He won with a greatly-extended record margin. His points total of 1,150 was nearly double that of the runner-up Samuel Kwant (605). He also set records of most wins in a single Games (10 in stage two, 14 including stage one), most cumulative event wins (29), most consecutive event wins (6), the first continuous unbroken lead in the Games, and his fifth title surpassed Froning's record of four.

On February 2, 2021, Fraser announced on Instagram that he had retired from competitive CrossFit.

=== Post-competition ===
Fraser released his HWPO ("Hard Work Pays Off") training program in April 2021, later extended to training for elite athletes, and delivered via his own platform. He also helped train other athletes and started providing individual coaching for athletes, including Mal O'Brien, Justin Medeiros, Katrin Davidsdottir, and Amanda Barnhart. He partnered with the filmmakers Buttery Bros to announce the launch of a supplement company named Podium Nutrition with its product release scheduled in July 2021. Fraser started to program for a number of competitions in 2022.

== Training and diet ==
After switching to CrossFit, Fraser did not follow a set training routine due to the constantly varied movements found in CrossFit and the CrossFit Games. In his early years in CrossFit, he did not dedicate his training to CrossFit, with only 1–2 hours a day of training a few times a week. He did not maintain a special diet and would often eat an entire pint of ice cream or a half-dozen donuts. After coming in second to Ben Smith at the 2015 CrossFit Games, he committed to a better diet and dropped ten pounds, eating no "junk food" or soda, and little pre-packaged food. He does not adhere to a specific diet like paleo (he found that it gave him insufficient energy) or counting macros, which is common in CrossFit. In general, he eats what he wants and when he wants it, aside from avoiding junk food and ensuring that he eats well with enough calorific intake. Fraser tended to consume four to five big calorie-dense meals a day when training for competition, which were mainly meat and vegetables, along with sticky white rice. During training, he took supplements such as branched-chain amino acids, pre-workout (including beta-alanine), and cannabidiol (for sleep), and drinks protein shakes and smoothies, snacks on Snickers bars, gummies, and fruits during workout sessions, and Gatorade after the hardest session. During competitions, food intake was kept broadly similar, but the quantity changed—less before competition events to avoid competing on a full stomach—with an increase in carbohydrates and a decrease in protein. His food intake reached 6–7,000 calories daily at the peak of his training. In the off-season when he did not train, he sometimes ate only one or two meals a day.

Fraser did not have a fixed set of training routines in the early years when he competed, but later he would have daily exercises involving Assault Bike and swimming intervals and 40-minute AMRAPs (as many reps as possible). He maintained some structure in his training. During a CrossFit season, his training varied over time, but he trained a minimum of two sessions a day four days a week. He typically had three track sessions, three or four weightlifting sessions, a couple of sessions swimming and one on road bike. The training may depend on what was done previously. A day concentrated on conditioning may be followed by strength work the next, and he tried to fit in conditioning, cardio, and technique work in a day. Every week one or two 40-minute EMOMs, a type of workout that is repeated every minute on the minute, were included in his training. He focused on his weaknesses, for example, after he struggled in flipping the pig (a rectangular block encased in rubber) in the 2015 Games which contributed to his failure to finish the event, he bought a "pig" so he could practice with it. Other weaknesses he focused on included sprinting after the 2015 Games, deadlift after the 2016 Games, and swimming after 2017. He always warmed up before and cooled down after his training. He did not train for many weeks in the off-season after the Games. When preparing for a competition, the training ramped up over a time period of 12 to 16 weeks, but he cut down on the training slightly approaching the competition (tapering), and avoided workouts that could adversely affect the following day. Fraser sees sleep as very important for recovery after training, and ensured that he had regular sleep of 9–10 hours when training or during competition.

In Vermont, he trained at Champlain Valley CrossFit and a home gym in the basement of his parents' house. In 2017, he started moving to Froning's hometown of Cookeville, Tennessee, where he trained at CrossFit Mayhem and later at Calfkiller Crossfit, as well as in his own home gym.

For many years he mostly trained alone, but when training with a partner in preparation for the Games, he preferred to train with female athletes as they are not direct competitors. Training partners included Katrín Davíðsdóttir and Tia-Clair Toomey. He trained with Toomey for the 2019 and 2020 CrossFit Games after she moved to Cookeville in 2018. Toomey's coach/husband Shane Orr also served as Fraser's coach these two seasons.

== Personal life ==
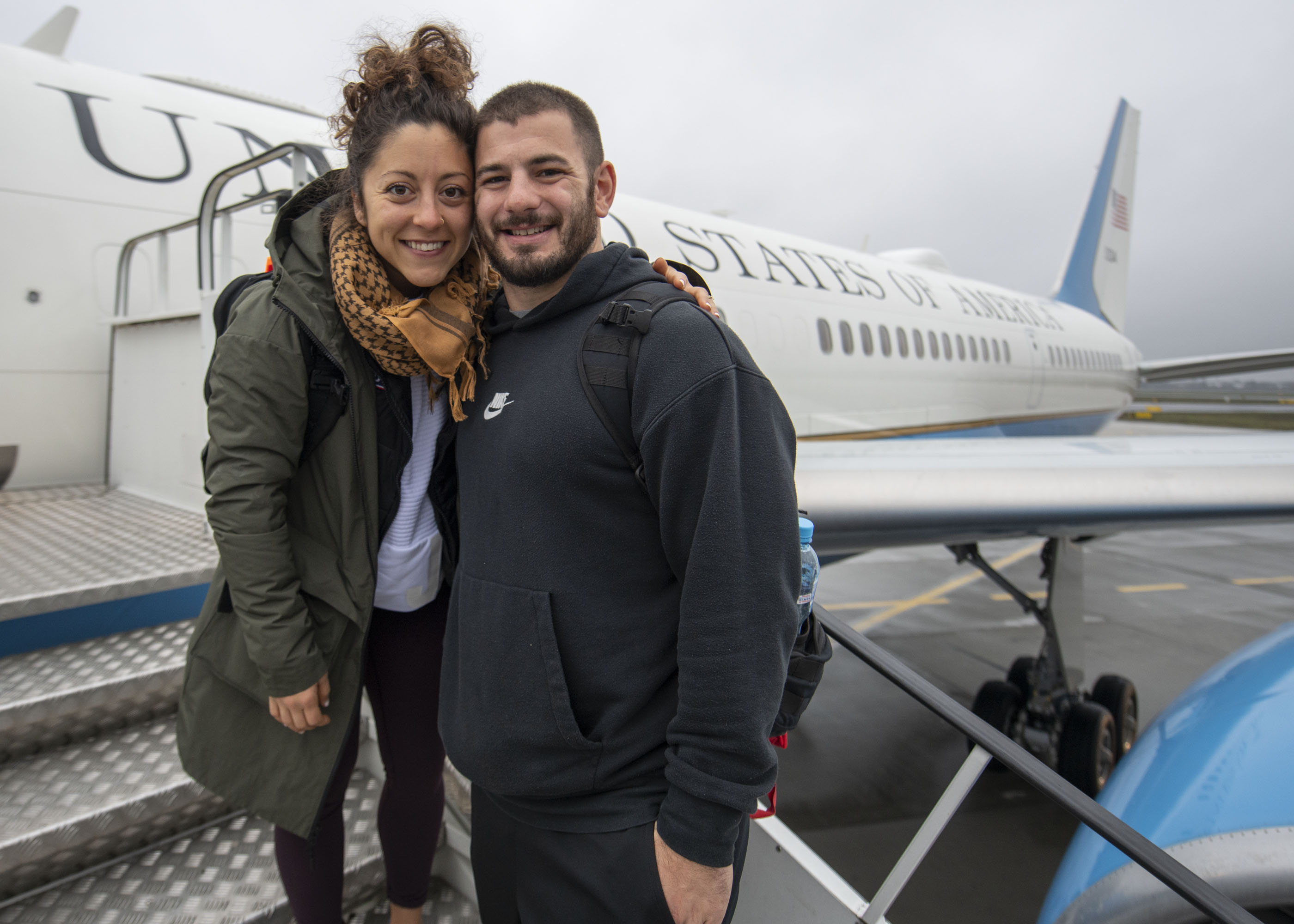
Sammy Moniz and Mat Fraser in 2018

Fraser lives with Sammy Moniz, who created the website Feeding The Frasers dedicated to food she cooks for Fraser. They have two daughters.

Fraser is deaf in one ear and hard of hearing in the other due to a childhood ear infection. He does not drink alcohol, and has described his drinking problems as a teenager that led to his being sober from the age of 17. He has the Serenity Prayer tattooed on his left upper arm, inked by his older brother Jesse who works as a tattoo artist.

Fraser has sponsorship deals with a number of companies, including Nike, Rogue, Athletic Brewing, Gowod, and Beam. Fraser's Nike sportswear, such as his personal editions of Metcon cross-training shoes, features his motto "Hard Work Pays Off" or its acronym HWPO.

== CrossFit Games results ==
Year	Games	Regionals	Open
2013		5th (North East)	192nd
2014	2nd	1st (North East)	7th
2015	2nd	1st (East)	1st
2016	1st	1st (East)	7th
2017	1st	1st (East)	1st
2018	1st	1st (Central)	1st
Year	Games	Sanctionals	Open
2019	1st	1st (Dubai); 1st (Rogue)	1st (world); 1st (United States)
2020	1st	1st (SiD)	2nd (world); 1st (United States)
