= 2015 CrossFit Games =

Athletic competition

- Venue: StubHub Center
- Location: Carson, California
- Dates: July 21–26, 2015

Champions
- Men: Ben Smith
- Women: Katrin Tanja Davidsdottir
- Team: CrossFit Mayhem Freedom

The 2015 CrossFit Games were the ninth CrossFit Games, which were held on July 21–26, 2015 at the StubHub Center in Carson, California. Ben Smith was the men's winner, and Katrin Davidsdottir was the women's winner. The Affiliate Cup was won by CrossFit Mayhem Freedom from Cookeville, Tennessee, captained by four-time individual men's champion Rich Froning Jr. who moved to team competition this year.

In the 2015 season, the 17 regions of previous seasons were combined into 8 "super-regions" for the Regionals. This season a Teenage competition for boys and girls was added in the Open for two age groups. The Teenage and Masters Games events were the same and took place from July 21–23.

Both the men's and women's competitions were closely fought at the Games. Ben Smith, a Games competitor every year since 2009, won for the first time (he placed third in 2011 and 2013), having secured the win only in the final event by holding off 2014's second-place finisher Mat Fraser who many had predicted would be the 2015 champion. In the women's competition, Iceland's Katrin Davidsdottir overtook fellow countrywoman Sara Sigmundsdóttir, who led for much of the competition, in the final event. Tia-Clair Toomey, who made her debut at this year's Games, finished second and was named Rookie of the Year.

== Qualification ==
=== Open ===
Approximately 273,000 participants signed up for the 2015 CrossFit Games Open, which was held over the course of five weeks from February 26 to March 30, 2015. There were 6 scored events in the Open this year, with the first workout splitting into two parts. Mat Fraser and Annie Thorisdottir were the respective male and female winners of the Open.

In 2015, a scaled division was introduced in the Open, allowing athletes to choose easier versions of the workouts to suit their ability. This year the winners of every state and country were crowned the State and National champions.

This year the CrossFit Games also added a Teenage competition to the Open in two age groups (14-15 and 16-17) for boys and girls. Towards the end of the Open, it was announced that the top 10 in each age group after the completion of the Open would qualify to participate in the Games. Masters athletes who qualified through the Open then competed in an online Games qualification, called the Masters Qualifier, instead of Regionals. The top 20 Masters men and women in each age group were invited to participate at the Games.

=== Regionals ===
The top 20 men, 20 women, and 15 teams from the 12 American and Canadian regions, the top 30 men, 30 women, and 20 teams in the European and Australian regions, and the top 10 men, 10 women, and 10 teams from Latin America, Africa, and Asia qualified for the CrossFit Regionals.

The Regionals were modified this year – the 17 regions were combined into 8 "super-regions", and the top athletes from each of the 17 regions were funnelled into these "Super Regionals". For example, the NorCal and SoCal Regionals were combined into one California Regional, with 40 men, 40 women and 30 teams competing. Five men and women from this region qualifying for the CrossFit Games. The scoring system for the Regionals was also changed this year; in previous year it had the same system as the Open (i.e. one point for first, two for second, etc.), starting this year the scoring table system used in the Games was adopted for the Regionals (e.g. 100 points for first, 95 for second, etc.). The Regionals were held over three weeks around the world from May 15 to May 31, and athletes competed in 7 workouts over 3 days of competition in each Regional. From the Regionals, 40 men, 40 women, and 40 teams qualified for the Games.

== Individual ==
As in previous years, the men's and women's competitions were similar, with the only differences being weights of lifted objects, heights of obstacles, etc. Elements introduced for the first time this year included open-ocean paddleboarding and peg board climbing. Unlike previous years, no athletes were cut in the later stages of the competition.

=== Wednesday, July 22, 2015 ===
==== Event 1: Pier Paddle ====
- 500 meter ocean swim
- 2 mile paddle
- 500 meter ocean swim

For the fourth straight year, the CrossFit Games began on the Wednesday before the traditional weekend events. The Games have started with a swim every year since 2011, with this year's event consisted of 500 meters of ocean swimming, followed by two miles of paddling on a paddleboard, and finished with another 500 meters of ocean swimming.

Jonne Koski won the event for the men and Kara Webb won for the women.

==== Event 2: Sandbag 2015 ====
The athletes moved weighted sandbags across the tennis stadium in the StubHub Center. They started by carrying/dragging the sandbags from the top of the stadium down to the floor, used a wheelbarrow to take them to the other side, and then pushed them over a wall and carried them to the top of the stadium. The men had to move 720 pounds and the women had 480 pounds total weight of sandbags. This event was nearly identical to an event held in 2010 except that the weight was increased and the wheelbarrows were specially made to handle the weight.

Lukas Högberg and Anna Tunnicliffe won the event men's and women's events, respectively.

=== Friday, July 24, 2015 ===
==== Event 3: Murph ====
While wearing a weighted vest (20lb. for men / 14lb. for the women):

- 1 mile run,
- 100 pull-ups
- 200 push-ups
- 300 air squats
- 1 mile run

Murph is named after fallen sailor US Navy SEAL Lt. Michael P. Murphy, and it is usually performed by American affiliates on Memorial Day. The event was held on a very hot afternoon at the Games, and the heat caused problems for a number of athletes such as Kara Webb and Annie Thorisdottir. Both Webb and Thorisdottir suffered from heat stroke in the event, Webb collapsed at the finish line and Thorisdottir failed to finish. Although Thorisdottir carried on competing for a few more events, she had to withdraw eventually due to the ill-effects from this event.

Björgvin Karl Guðmundsson won the men's event and Samantha Briggs won the women's. Samantha Briggs finished the event faster than any of the men aside from Guðmundsson.

==== Event 4: Snatch Speed Ladder ====
Three rounds of:

- 5 squat snatches

Within each round, each snatch is heavier than the last (a "ladder"), and the starting weight increases each round. Those who complete the ladder the fastest move on to the next round. Jon Pera won the men's event and Brooke Ence won the women's.

==== Event 5: Heavy DT ====
Five rounds for time, with a 205-pound barbell for the men and a 145-pound barbell for the women:

- 12 Deadlifts
- 9 hang power cleans
- 6 jerks

"DT" is a CrossFit hero workout named for fallen airman USAF SSgt. Timothy P. Davis, and usually performed with a 155-pound/105-pound barbell for men/women. The event was announced after event 4, and the audience were given a choice of two different versions of DT for the athletes to compete in: Double DT or Heavy DT, and they chose Heavy DT.

Ben Smith won the men's event and Sara Sigmundsdottir won the women's.

=== Saturday, July 25, 2015 ===
==== Events 6 & 7: Sprint Course 1 & 2 ====
A sprint across the soccer field at the StubHub Center through four pylons in a zig-zag and over four hurdles. Sprint Course 1 started with the four pylons followed by the hurdles and Sprint Course 2 was in the opposite direction after one minute of rest.

Dan Bailey won both events for the men and Lindy Barber won Sprint Course 1 for the women while Kristin Holte won Sprint Course 2.

==== Event 8: Soccer Chipper ====
- 100 foot "Pig" flip
- 4 legless rope climbs
- 100 foot handstand walk

The event took place on the soccer field and started with flipping a weighted box called a "pig". The box weight was 560 pounds for the men and 395 for the women, and the length was over 6 feet, making the flips more difficult than shorter objects that many athletes had trained with. The first two legless rope climbs were done on a 2-inch diameter rope and the last two on a 1.5-inch diameter rope. The handstand walks had to be completed in 50-foot unbroken increments.

Fraser struggled in flipping the pig, which led to his failure to finish the legless rope climb. The event was won by Ben Smith, and as a result Fraser lost his large lead over Smith, and Smith took over as leader. Elisabeth Akinwale won for the women.

==== Event 9: Clean & Jerk ====
- 1 rep max Clean & Jerk

Each athlete gets two 20-second windows in which to attempt their heaviest clean and jerk for one repetition.

Aaron Hanna won the event with a 350-pound lift for the men and Brooke Ence won with a 242-pound lift for the women.

==== Event 10: Triangle Couplet ====
15–10–6 repetitions of:

- Thrusters
- Bar muscle-ups

Named "Triangle Couplet" because the repetitions per round are all triangular numbers. A thruster in CrossFit is a combination of a front squat and push press in one continuous movement and the weights were 165-pounds for the men and 115-pounds for the women. A bar muscle-up is a pull-up variant in which the athlete pulls themselves over the top of the pull-up bar and finishes with the bar at their hips.

Mathew Fraser won for the men and Camille Leblanc-Bazinet won for the women.

=== Sunday, July 26, 2015 ===
==== Event 11: Midline Madness ====
Six rounds of:

- 400 meter run
- 50 foot yoke carry

The event took place inside the soccer stadium with the 400 meter run going up the stadium stairs, behind the jumbotron, and down the stars on the other side. The yoke, weighing 380 pounds for the men and 300 pounds for the women, was carried 300 feet across the soccer field.

Jacob Heppner won for the men and Samantha Briggs won for the women.

==== Event 12: Pedal to the Metal 1 ====
- 3 peg board ascents
- 24-calorie row
- 16-calorie bike
- 8 dumbbell squat snatches

The peg board ascents involved climbing a peg board using only two wooden pegs. The 24 calories were rowed on a Concept-2 rowing machine. The 16 calories were pedaled on an Assault AirBike. The dumbbell squat snatches are performed with a 100-pound/70-pound dumbbell for the men/women respectively and done with alternating arms. The peg board was introduced for the first time which many athletes found difficult, and only three women completed the peg board ascents and none completed the event.

Spencer Hendel won for the men and Margaux Alvarez for the women. Mat Fraser finished second, which gave him an overall lead of just two points in front of Ben Smith going into the final event.

==== Event 13: Pedal to the Metal 2 ====
- 12 parallette deficit handstand push-ups
- 24-calorie row
- 16-calorie bike
- 8 kettlebell deadlifts

This event took place two minutes after Event 12. The handstand push-ups were performed against a wall. The row and bike were identical to the previous event. The deadlifts were performed with a 203-pound/124-pound (men/women) kettlebell in each hand, and after every two lifts, the weights were carried forward.

Spencer Hendel won again for the men in the event. Ben Smith finished fourth but well before Mat Fraser, thereby emerged the overall winner of the 2015 Games. Katrin Tanja Davidsdottir won for the women's event, which made her champion of the Games.

== Team events ==
All events scored 100 points apart from the 3 Synchros events and the 6 Solo Sprint events which were scored 50. Top ten teams advanced to compete after the Tire Relay event on the final day.

- Water Worm – 3 rounds of deadlifts with Worm (75-50-25 reps), between the deadlifts were two 500-yard swim with rescue sled.
- 6-Mile Relay – 1-mile run by each of the 6 members in a relay
- Earth Worm – 3 rounds of 600m run and Worm squat (25-50-75 reps)
- Synchros – 3 events, each with one male-female pair 545 lb deadlifts and synchronised muscles-ups. First pair 21 reps, second 14-7 reps, third 8-7-6 reps
- Clean and Jerk – 2 events (first all female, second all male) of 1-rep-max clean and jerk (total weights)
- Male / Female Chipper – 2 event, first male, second female - 100-ft. weighted lunge (300 lb. slug for men / 225 lb. slug for women), 40 wall-ball (30 lb. men / 20 lb. women) all performed simultaneously, 100-ft handstand walk, 40 wall-ball, 100 ft. weighted lunge
- Big Bob Drag Race – 300-ft Big Bob push
- Tire Relay – 2 rounds of 50-ft. tire flip and 20 tire jump overs, followed by 9 legless rope climbs and 125 hang-to-overheads (95 lb.) 3 athletes performed forward, 3 backwards.
- Finals Solo Sprint – 6 events, each member perform muscle-ups, handstand push-up, and on bike, first two (one male and one female) perform 15 muscle-ups, 10 handstand push-up and 20-calorie bike, second 13, 10, 25-calorie, last two 11, 10 and 30-calorie.
- Worm Finale – 50 Worm clean and jerks

== Podium finishers ==
=== Individuals and teams ===
| Place | Men | Women | Team |
|---|---|---|---|
| 1st | Ben Smith | Katrin Tanja Davidsdottir | CrossFit Mayhem Freedom |
| 2nd | Mat Fraser | Tia-Clair Toomey | CrossFit Milford |
| 3rd | Björgvin Karl Guðmundsson | Ragnheiður Sara Sigmundsdottir | UTE CrossFit |

=== Masters men ===
| Place | 40-44 | 45-49 | 50-54 | 55-59 | 60+ |
|---|---|---|---|---|---|
| 1st | Shawn Ramirez | Matthew Swift | Joe Ames | Will Powell | Steve Pollini |
| 2nd | Travis Page | Bill Grundler | Steve Parsoneault | Mike Heikens* | Denny Hawkins |
| 3rd | Jeffrey Prejean | Ron Mathews | Frank Wray | David Gantz* | Robert Caslin |

* — Steve Marino originally finished in second place in the 55-59 division but was later disqualified for use of an anabolic agent. Heikens and Gantz were each moved up one position.

=== Masters women ===
| Place | 40-44 | 45-49 | 50-54 | 55-59 | 60+ |
|---|---|---|---|---|---|
| 1st | Janet Black | Kylie Massi | Cindy Kelley | Susan Clarke | Rosalie Glenn |
| 2nd | Karen McCadam | Chris Perrins | Tracy Maceachern | Lynne Knapman | Bernadette Elliott |
| 3rd | Amanda Allen | Francine Pehi | Laurie Meschishnick | Michelle Barnes | Mary Schwing |

=== Teens ===
| Place | 14-15 Boys | 14-15 Girls | 16-17 Boys | 16-17 Girls |
|---|---|---|---|---|
| 1st | Angelo Dicicco | Sydney Sullivan | Nicholas Paladino | Isabella Vallejo |
| 2nd | Luke Pearson | Megan Trupp | Mickael Sarrazin | Ashleigh Wosny |
| 3rd | Vincent Ramirez | Lindsey Porter | Rees Machell | Allison Weiss |

== See also ==
- CrossFit
