= Katrín Davíðsdóttir =

Icelandic CrossFit athlete (born 1993)

Katrín Tanja Davíðsdóttir
Personal information
- Nationality: Icelandic
- Born: Katrín Tanja Davíðsdóttir; 10 May 1993 (age 33) London, United Kingdom
- Occupation: CrossFit athlete
- Years active: 2012–2024
- Height: 1.69 m (5 ft 7 in)
- Weight: 69 kg (152 lb)

Sport
- Sport: CrossFit
- Club: CrossFit New England; Reebok CrossFit Reykjavik
- Coached by: Matthew Fraser

Achievements and titles
- World finals: 2015 CrossFit Games Champion; 2016 CrossFit Games Champion
- Regional finals: 1st: 2016, 2018; 2nd: 2012, 2015, 2017; 3rd: 2013
- Personal bests: Clean and Jerk: 98 kg (216 lb); Snatch: 91.6 kg (202 lb); Deadlift: 140 kg (310 lb); Backsquat: 115 kg (254 lb); Fran: 2:28; Helen: 9:16; Grace: 1:28; Fight Gone Bad: 454; Sprint 400m: 1:05

Katrín Tanja Davíðsdóttir (Icelandic pronunciation: [ˈkʰaːtrin ˈtaːviðsˌtouʰtɪr̥]; born 10 May 1993) is an Icelandic former CrossFit athlete known for her 10 appearances at the CrossFit Games from 2012 to 2023, with the exception of 2014 and 2022. She is the women's champion of the 2015 and 2016 CrossFit Games. Katrín is the second woman to repeat as champion, following in the footsteps of her countrywoman, 2011 and 2012 CrossFit Games champion Anníe Mist Þórisdóttir.

== CrossFit Games career ==
Katrín has a background in track and gymnastics. She became interested in CrossFit when she saw Anníe Mist Þórisdóttir win the 2011 CrossFit Games. She first qualified for the CrossFit Games in 2012 where she finished 30th. She also qualified for the 2013 Games.

Katrín missed qualification in 2014 due to a relatively poor performance at the Europe Regional on Event 5, a combination of legless rope climbs and sprints. Katrín finished in the top 10 on every 2014 Regional Event except this one, in which she dropped to 24th. In the end, 9 points separated Katrín from the final 2014 Games qualifier out of the Europe Regional, third-ranked Norwegian athlete Kristin Holte.

Katrín has said that missing qualification in 2014 was the "differentiator" that helped her come back to the Games and win in 2015.

Not making it last year affected me a lot, and I think that is a differentiator. I started working more closely with my coach, Ben Bergeron, and he not only got me the fittest that I've ever been, but he got my mental game to a whole other level. And I think that's the biggest thing. We can all work out and we're all fit, but this year I've been working so much on my mental approach and just staying in that mental mind game, staying focused on yourself, and only the next task at hand.

— Katrín Davíðsdóttir, interview published on ESPNW.

Katrin's only event win at the 2015 Games came in the final event, Pedal to the Metal 2, but that was enough to move her ahead of countrywoman Ragnheiður Sara Sigmundsdóttir, who had been in first place going into the last two events.

At the 2016 CrossFit Games, Katrín won 3 events: Double DT, Handstand Walk, and The Plow. She beat off a challenge from Tia-Clair Toomey to become the 3rd athlete (after Rich Froning and Anníe Mist Þórisdóttir) to have repeated their win at the Games.

At the 2017 CrossFit Games, Katrín managed two wins, Strongman's Fear and 2223 Intervals. In a tightly fought Games, she ended up in 5th place overall.

In 2018, Katrín finished 3rd behind Tia-Clair Toomey and Laura Horvath.

In 2020, Katrín received an invitation to the Games. In the Covid-19-affected season, Katrín won two events and finished fourth in Stage 1 to become one of five female athletes who can compete in person at the ranch in Aromas. At the Stage 2 of the Games, in a much-reduced field dominated by Tia-Clair Toomey, she managed one event win and returned to the podium, finishing in 2nd place.

In 2022, Katrín failed to qualify for the CrossFit Games after finishing sixth at the Games semifinal Strength in Depth, and then third in the Last Chance Qualifier.

Katrín qualified for the 2023 CrossFit Games after finishing second in the North American West semifinal. At the Games, she performed poorly in the Pig Chipper event, but came 2nd on two events (Cross-Country 5K and Echo Thruster Final), finishing up in 7th place overall.

Katrín withdrew from the 2024 season due to a back injury and underwent surgery.

In December 2024, Katrín announced her retirement from competitive CrossFit.

== Training background ==
Katrín started doing CrossFit in September 2011 at the age of 18. She had 10 years of training as a gymnast as well as 1 year of competition experience in track and field (athletics).

From 2016 to 2021, she trained under coach Ben Bergeron (CompTrain) at CrossFit New England in the United States of America. Prior to this, she trained at Reebok CrossFit Reykjavik, in Reykjavik, Iceland, and CrossFit Stodin. In 2021, Katrin left CompTrain and moved to train at Reebok CrossFit Reykjavik under coach Jami Tikkanen. After failing to qualify for the 2022 CrossFit Games, she moved to Mat Fraser's HWPO training camp.

== Television appearance ==
Katrín appeared on the 30th season premiere of The Amazing Race, where she asked teams to identify two national tonics: Brennivín and Þorskalýsi.

== Personal life ==
Katrín's grandfather is Helgi Ágústsson, the former ambassador of Iceland to the United States.

In 2021, it was announced that she was in a relationship with former Canadian ice hockey player, Brooks Laich. They announced their engagement in December 2024. Their daughter Emberly Heba was born in October 2025. They were married in Idaho on August 15, 2026.

== CrossFit Games results ==
Year	Games	Regionals		Open
2012	30th	2nd (Europe)		21st (World)
2013	24th	3rd (Europe)		37th (World)
2014	—	6th (Europe)		122nd (World)
2015	1st	2nd (Meridian)		14th (World)
2016	1st	1st (East)		14th (World)
2017	5th	2nd (East)		10th (World)
2018	3rd	1st (East)		8th (World)
Year	Games	Sanctional		Open
2019	4th	1st (Cape Town)		13th (World)
2020	2nd	N/A		23rd (World)
Year	Games	Semifinal	Quarterfinal	Open
2021	10th	3rd (German Throwdown)	47th (World); 11th (Europe)	14th (World); 5th (Europe)
2022	—	6th (Strength in Depth); 3rd (Last Chance Qualifier)	55th (World); 22nd (Europe)	138th (World); 46th (Europe)
2023	7th	3rd (North America West)	67th (World); 20th (North America West)	95th (World); 21st (North America West)
