= Colleen Fahey =

American rugby union player

- Height: 5 ft 6 in (1.68 m)
- Weight: 150 lb (68 kg; 10 st 10 lb)

Rugby union career
- Position: Prop
International career
Years	Team	Apps	(Points)
1991	United States		

Colleen Fahey is a former female American rugby union player. She played for the United States at the inaugural 1991 Women's Rugby World Cup in Wales. She won the 50–54 Masters age division at the 2013 CrossFit Games and third in the 2018 CrossFit Games 55–59 division.
