= 2017 CrossFit Games =

Athletic competition

- Venue: Alliant Energy Center
- Location: Madison, Wisconsin
- Dates: August 3–6, 2017

Champions
- Men: Mathew Fraser
- Women: Tia-Clair Toomey
- Team: Wasatch CrossFit

The 2017 CrossFit Games are the eleventh CrossFit Games and were held on August 3–6, 2017, at the Alliant Energy Center in Madison, Wisconsin, United States. This was the first Games held outside the state of California. The men's competition was won by Mathew Fraser, the women's by Tia-Clair Toomey, and Wasatch CrossFit won the Affiliate Cup. Fraser won $310,000 (Note: Originally listed as $308,000, Fraser's win was augmented to $310,000 after Ricky Garard was disqualified for doping, as his revised results in Cyclocross (second to event winner) and Madison Triplet (third to second) allowed him to collect $1,000 for each improved position in the said events.) for his efforts and Toomey won $298,000 for her title, including bonus for event wins.

This was the first year the Masters 35–39 division was introduced. This was the first CrossFit Games in which a podium finisher in the Individual competition was disqualified for using illegal performance-enhancing substances when Ricky Garard tested positive after the Games were complete. The women's competition had one of the closest finishes in the Games history, when Toomey won by only 2 points over fellow Australian Kara Webb. For the men's competition, Fraser dominated and extended his record winning margin to 216 points over second place Brent Fikowski.

This year CBS Sports started its coverage of the Games on CBS Sports Network with live broadcast and a two-hour show of the main competition every night and a recap show on Saturday, as well as up to 40 hours of live streaming on its digital service.

== Qualification ==
Over 380,000 competitors participated in this year's CrossFit Open. The Open took place over 5 weeks from February 23 through March 27, 2017, with one workout released each week. A new Masters 35-39 Division was introduced this year. The workouts for the Open were stream live from many locations around the world for the first time. Mat Fraser and Sara Sigmundsdóttir were the respective winner of the men's and women's competitions, Fraser won convincingly with two event wins, while Sigmundsdottir won by only four points over second-place Kari Pearce.

As with previous years, the top athletes from each of the Open Region moved on to 8 Regionals, and all the top men and women who can qualify for the Regionals were required to submitted videos of their performance from the Open, although this year more are required to submit their videos than previous years. The 8 Regionals took place in three consecutive weekends from May 19 to June 4. Most Regionals had 40 men, 40 women and 30 teams competing. The top five men, top five women, and top five teams from each Regional qualified for the Games, giving a total of 40 men, 40 women and 40 teams who qualified for the Games.

== Individual ==
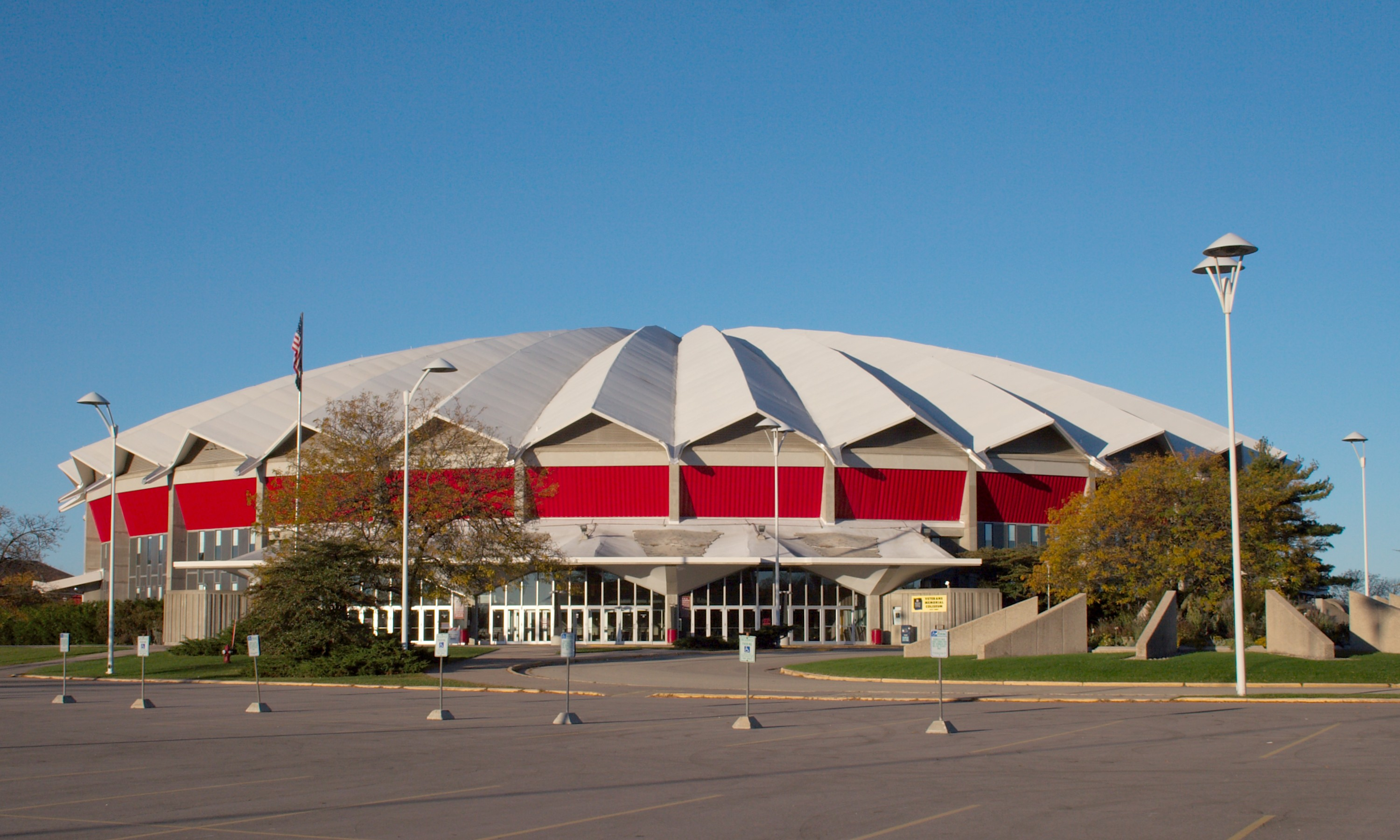
Alliant Energy Center in Madison, Wisconsin, location for the 2017 Games

The 2017 CrossFit Games were held at the Alliant Energy Center in Madison, Wisconsin for the first time after seven years at the StubHub Center in Carson, California. This year, minimum work requirements were introduced for two events at the Games: Run Swim Run and Sprint O-Course where athletes would be eliminated if they cannot finish a movement or complete the event within a set time.

=== Thursday, August 3, 2017 ===
==== Event 1: Run Swim Run ====
- 1.5 mile run
- 500 meter swim
- 1.5 mile run

Athletes ran to Lake Monona from the Alliant Energy Center, swam around a set of buoys, and then back to the arena. The event was won by Brent Fikowski and Tia-Clair Toomey. Later in 2021, a coach said that Mat Fraser almost drowned during the swim portion of this event, but he was helped by Fikowski.

==== Event 2: Cyclocross ====
- 3 laps around a cyclocross course

The event was held nearby in Quann Park and had bikes supplied by Wisconsin-based Trek Bicycle Corporation. The course's obstacles included logs, small wooden hurdles and a sand trap. The event was won by Mat Fraser and Kristin Holte.

==== Event 3: Amanda .45 ====
- 13–11–9–7–5 repetitions of muscle-ups and squat snatches for time.

Athletes performed 13 muscle-ups on gymnastic rings and then 13 snatches, followed by 11 muscle-ups and 11 snatches, etc. until finishing the sets of 5. The snatch weight was 135 pounds for the men and 95 pounds for the women. This is a variation of the event "Amanda" introduced at the 2010 CrossFit Games as a tribute to former Games athlete, Amanda Miller, who died in 2010 and was known for the pistol tattoos on her hips. The event was won by Dakota Rager for the men and by Jamie Greene for the women.

Mat Fraser injured his LCL on his knee while stretching after the first day competition, but kept quiet on his injury and continued to compete the next few days.

=== Friday, August 4, 2017 ===
==== Event 4: Sprint O-Course ====
- Obstacle course race

Competitors raced head-to-head in three rounds across an obstacle course consisting of a cargo net climb, wall climb, monkey bars, log balances, and a rope ladder. The event was won by Patrick Vellner and Tennil Reed-Beuerlein.

==== Event 5: 1RM Snatch ====
- 1-rep max snatch

The event was won by Garret Fisher with a 305-pound lift and Kara Webb with a 203-pound lift. Fisher's 305-pound snatch was a Games record.

==== Event 6: Triple-G Chipper ====
- 100 pull-ups
- 80 GHD sit-ups
- 60 alternating one-legged squats
- 40-calorie row
- 20 dumbbell push press

The event was a "chipper," a workout involving multiple exercises done sequentially without returning (as in "chipping away" at the number of repetitions) for the fastest time. After the 100 pull-ups, the competitors performed 80 sit-ups on a glute-hamstring developer (GHD), a piece of equipment where the feet lock in and the sit-up is performed at a greater range of motion. After the sit-ups, athletes performed 60 one-legged squats, also called "pistols", alternating the movement between each leg. The 40-calorie row was performed on a Concept-2 rowing machine. The dumbbells for the push press were 100-pounds for the men and 70-pounds for the women. The event was won by Mathew Fraser and Kara Webb.

==== Event 7: Assault Banger ====
- Assault AirBike for calories
- 20-foot Banger

The competitors started on the Assault bike and the calories were 40 for men and 30 for women. After the bike, the athletes used a sledgehammer to hit a weighted block on a recessed track until it had moved 20 feet. The event was won by George Sanchez and Samantha Briggs.

=== Saturday, August 5, 2017 ===
==== Event 8: Strongman's Fear ====
- Move a yoke, farmer's logs, and a sled across a field. Return down the field in a handstand walk

Competitors had to move a series of strongman elements; a yoke (500 pounds for men, 340 pounds for women), two farmer's logs (200 pounds each for men, 120 pounds each for women), and a sled (400 pounds for men, 310 pounds for women). The objects had to be taken halfway down the field (60 feet) and then the competitor returned using a handstand walk. Once all objects were at the halfway mark, the competitors took the objects to the end of the field, also returning to the middle of the field with a handstand walk. The objects could be moved in any order. Brent Fikowski won the event for the men and Katrin Tanja Davidsdottir for the women.

==== Event 9: Muscle-up Clean Ladder ====
- Eight rounds for time of:
  - 4 bar muscle-ups
  - 2 cleans with ascending weight

Competitors performed each round beginning with four muscle-ups on a pull-up bar followed by two cleans. After each round the weight increased starting with 225 pounds for the men and 145 pounds for the women and ending with 350 and 235 pounds, respectively. Mathew Fraser won the event for the men and Tia-Clair Toomey won for the women.

==== Event 10: Heavy 17.5 ====
- 10 rounds for time of:
  - 9 thrusters
  - 35 double-unders

A heavier version of a previous Open qualifier event in 2017. A double-under is a jumping rope movement where the rope passes beneath the athlete twice per jump. A thruster in CrossFit is a combination of a front squat and push press in one continuous movement and the weights were 125 pounds for the men and 85 pounds for the women. Mathew Fraser won for the men and Kara Webb won for the women.

=== Sunday, August 6, 2017 ===
==== Event 11: Madison Triplet ====
5 rounds for time of:

- 450 meter run
- 7 hay bale clean burpees

Athletes ran around a 450-meter path outside of the stadium. In the stadium, there were five rows of hay bale walls. The athletes would enter the stadium and clean a sandbag up and toss it over the hay bale wall. They would then perform a burpee and then jump over the wall. The hay bale clean burpee would be performed seven times at the same hay bale wall before moving the sandbag to the next wall. After the sandbag is moved, the athletes ran back to the path to make another lap. The sandbags were 100 pounds for the men and 70 pounds for the women. The event was won by Patrick Vellner for the men and Samantha Briggs for the women.

==== Event 12: 2223 Intervals ====
4 rounds of:

- 2 rope climbs
- 10/7-calorie SkiErg
- Maximum repetitions of overhead squats with remaining time

This was an interval event with the first three rounds consisting of two minutes of work and then one minute of rest. The final round was three minutes of work to get as many overhead squats as possible or a total of 75 through all rounds for time. For each round, competitors started with two 20-foot rope climbs. After the rope climbs, the competitors pulled 10 calories for men and 7 calories for women on a SkiErg, a machine built by Concept2 similar to their rowing machines but meant to simulate a cross-country skiing motion. With the remaining time in each interval, they accumulated as many squats as they could with 155 pounds for the men and 105 pounds for the women. The event was won by Mathew Fraser and Katrín Davíðsdóttir. Significantly for the women's competition, Kara Webb who finished second was penalized 6 seconds after a judge erroneously allowed her to finish before she had completed all her reps (she was penalized 2 seconds for every rep she did not complete), which dropped her to fourth and more crucially lost her 10 points.

==== Event 13: Fibonacci Final ====
- Parallette handstand push-ups (5 for men / 3 for women)
- 5 Deadlifts with two kettlebells (203 lb. for men / 124 lb. for women)
- Parallette handstand push-ups (8 for men / 5 for women)
- 8 Kettlebell deadlifts (203 lb. for men / 124 lb. for women)
- Parallette handstand push-ups (13 for men /8 for women)
- 13 Kettlebell deadlifts (203 lb. for men / 124 lb. for women)
- 89-foot overhead lunge with two 53-pound kettlebells (53 lb. for men / 35 lb. for women)

This event was won by Logan Collins and Ragnheiður Sara Sigmundsdottir. In the men's event, only Collins finished within the six-minute time cap with 2017 Games champion Mathew Fraser ending one lunge from the finish to take second in the event. On the women's side, Kara Webb had been in second-place overall below Tia-Clair Toomey. She edged out Toomey on the event by 0.19 seconds but did not overtake her in total points, finishing two points behind on the final standings.

== Team events ==
Teams were cut to 10 after the Burpee Litter event,

- Run Swim Run Relay
- Muscle-up Snatch
- Team O-Course
- Clean and Jerk – two events, one male, one female
- Rowing Worm
- Drag & Drive
- Couple Couplets
- Worm Rotation
- Burpee Litter
- Worm Complex

== Doping Violations ==
Ricky Garard, who was placed third in the men's competition, tested positive for two performance enhancement drugs, testolone and endurobol, after the Games were complete. Garard was disqualified, his podium ranking removed, and lost his $76,000 winnings. As the Games had already concluded, all his finishes were simply voided with all other competitors moving up one position in the final standings. However, the event points were not redistributed, but the prize money was. Patrick Vellner replaced Garard as the third-place finisher. Garard who was named "Rookie of the Year" also had that honor removed, although Jamie Simmons who was the next most successful rookie was not officially recognised.

== Podium ==
=== Individuals and teams ===
Place	Men	Women	Team
1st	Mathew Fraser	Tia-Clair Toomey	Wasatch CrossFit
2nd	Brent Fikowski	Kara Webb	CrossFit Mayhem
3rd	Patrick Vellner (Note: Ricky Garard originally finished third but was later disqualified for testing positive for banned performance-enhancing substances. Vellner was moved up one position.)	Annie Thorisdottir	CrossFit Fort Vancouver

=== Masters men ===
Place	35–39	40–44	45–49	50–54	55–59	60+
1st	Kyle Kasperbauer	Shawn Ramirez	Robert Davis	Kevin Koester	Shannon Aiken	David Hippensteel
2nd	Neal Maddox	Robbie Perovich	Brent Maier	Craig Eisman	Robert Boshoven (Note: Anthony Turski originally finished second but was later disqualified for testing positive for banned performance-enhancing substances. The next two finishers were moved up one position.)	Hilmar Hardarson
3rd	Chris Spealler	Yurii Hanson	John Lynch	Marco Casali	Dewayne Sapp	Rodrigo Dominguez

=== Masters women ===
Place	35–39	40–44	45–49	50–54	55–59	60+
1st	Stephanie Roy	Helen Harding	Cheryl Brost	Marion Valkenburg (Note: Josée Sarda originally finished first but was later disqualified for testing positive for banned performance-enhancing substances. The next three finishers were moved up one position.)	Susan Clarke	Patty Failla
2nd	Joey Kimdon	Karen McCadam	Kylie Massi	Shellie Edington	Mary Beth Prodromides	Shaun Havard
3rd	Rebecca Voigt	Annie Sakamoto	Tonia Osborne	Diane Stuart	Kelli Dean	Marcia Yager

=== Teens ===
Place	14–15 Boys	14–15 Girls	16–17 Boys	16–17 Girls
1st	Dallin Pepper	Chloe Smith	Angelo DiCicco	Kaela Stephano
2nd	Amir Fahmy	Devyn Kim	Guilherme Malheiros	Haley Adams
3rd	Reece Mitchell	Ellie Kerstetter	Cole Greashaber	Filippa Ferm

== See also ==
- CrossFit
