= 2018 CrossFit Games =

Athletic competition

- Venue: Alliant Energy Center
- Location: Madison, Wisconsin
- Dates: August 1–5, 2018

Champions
- Men: Mathew Fraser
- Women: Tia-Clair Toomey
- Team: CrossFit Mayhem Freedom

The 2018 CrossFit Games was the 12th CrossFit Games and held on August 1–5, 2018, at the Alliant Energy Center in Madison, Wisconsin, United States. The men's competition was won by Mathew Fraser, the women's by Tia-Clair Toomey, and CrossFit Mayhem Freedom won the Affiliate Cup.

A record number of entries was reported for this year's Open, with over 415,000 athletes registering to compete. The Regionals were adjusted this year to reflect the growth of the sport worldwide. Both Fraser and Toomey dominated the Games, with Fraser extending his record margin of victory to 220 over the runner-up Patrick Vellner.

== Qualification ==
=== Open ===
The 2018 CrossFit Open was a high point in terms of participation; it recorded the highest number of athletes, at over 415,000, who registered to compete in the Open. Across all age divisions, 429,157 took part in and completed at least one workout. There were six scored event in five weeks (the second workout was split into two scored events – 18.2 and 18.2a). The Open took place from February 22 through March 26. Mat Fraser and Cassidy Lance-Mcwherter were the respective man and woman winner of the Open. Fraser's points total of 97 was 343 points lower than that of the second place finisher Alex Vigneault, the biggest margin of victory in the Open's history.

=== Regionals ===
The Regionals were adjusted this year to reflect the growth of the sport worldwide; the number of Regionals was increased from eight to nine, and athletes from 18 regions were funnelled into the nine Regionals. Latin America that was previously merged with a US Regional was given its own Regional, while Regionals in the US were reorganized down to five, and Europe was split into two (Europe and Meridian). The number of qualifiers to the Games, however, remained the same: 40 men, 40 women and 40 teams. The Regionals took place over three weekends from May 18 through June 3, 2018. The Regionals were streamed live on CBSSports.com.

== Individual ==
=== Wednesday, August 1, 2018 ===
==== Event 1: Crit ====
- Bike 10 laps for time, approximately 1200 meters per lap.

Athletes competed in a criterium race on bicycles with all competing athletes on the track simultaneously. Patrick Vellner crashed in the event, and finished in 35th place. The event was won by Adrian Mundwiler the men's heat and Kristin Holte for the women's heat.

==== Event 2: 30 Muscle-ups ====
The athletes performed 30 muscle-ups on gymnastic rings as fast as possible. The event was won by Logan Collins and Kristi Eramo.

==== Event 3: CrossFit Total ====
- One lift of a maximum weight for a back squat
- One lift of a maximum weight for a shoulder press
- One lift of a maximum weight for a deadlift

Athletes had four minutes to make three attempts at each lift for the heaviest weight. The winning score was the cumulative total of the three heaviest weights in each lift. Sara Sigmundsdottir fractured her rib during the warm-up for this event, but continued competing for this and the following events, eventually had to withdraw from the competition before event 10. The event was won by Royce Dunne (100 kg shoulder press, and 213 kg back squat, and 256 kg deadlift) for the men and by Tia-Clair Toomey (150 kg back squat, and 58 kg shoulder press, and 188 kg deadlift) for the women.

==== Event 4: Marathon Row ====
The competitors used a Concept-2 rowing machine to accumulate 42,195 meters, the distance of a marathon, as fast as possible. The event was won by Lukas Esslinger with a time of 2 hours, 43 minutes, 50 seconds and Margaux Alvarez at 3 hours, 0 minutes, 42 seconds.

=== Friday, August 3, 2018 ===
==== Event 5: The Battleground ====
For time while wearing a weighted vest:

- Rescue Randy drag
- Two rope climbs
- Obstacle course run
- Two rope climbs
- Rescue Randy drag

Competitors started by dragging "Rescue Randy", a weighted rescue training mannequin, across the stadium. After the drag, they climbed two 20-foot (6.1-meter) ropes, each with a different diameter. They then ran a course with eight obstacles consisting of cargo net climbs, wall climbs, monkey bars, rope swings, and log balances. The competitors then returned to the rope climbs and dummy drag.

At the event, both Mat Fraser and Patrick Vellner fell off the cargo net, with Vellner bruising his lungs and required medical attention after the race. The event was won by Cole Sager and Laura Horváth.

==== Event 6: Clean and Jerk Speed Ladder ====
The event consists of three rounds of five progressively heavier clean and jerks. The men start at 245 pounds (111 kilograms) and the women start at 155 pounds (70 kilograms). The top 20 athletes to finish the five lifts in quarterfinal round with a one-minute time cap move on to the semifinal round. With a two-minute cap and five heavier barbells, the top five competitors move on to the final round. The final round has the five athletes progress through five heavier weights as fast as possible, or as heaviest weight they can lift in the three-minute time cap. The event was won by Nicholas Urankar and Amanda Barnhart.

==== Event 7: Fibonacci ====
- 5 parallette handstand push-ups
- 5 deadlifts with two kettlebells
- 8 parallette handstand push-ups
- 8 kettlebell deadlifts
- 13 parallette handstand push-ups
- 13 kettlebell deadlifts
- 89-foot overhead lunge with two kettlebells

A repeat of the final event of the previous year, with only a change to women's event to make it match the number of movements as the men. The previous year, Logan Collins was the only man to finish the event (with a time of 5:29:09), while 27 women finished with the lower quantity of handstand push-ups. The parallettes are 14 inches (36 centimeters) for the men and 8 inches (20 centimeters) for the women. The men use 203-pound (92-kilogram) kettlebells for the deadlifts and 53-pound (24-kilogram) kettlebells for the lunges. The women use 124-pound (56-kilogram) kettlebells for the deadlifts and 35-pound (16-kilogram) kettlebells for the lunges. All must be done with a six-minute time cap.

The event was won by Mat Fraser, who had taken second in the event the previous year, and Katrín Davíðsdóttir. Four men finished the 2018 event, including previous finisher Logan Collins, and 23 women finished the updated version of the event.

=== Saturday, August 4, 2018 ===
==== Event 8: Madison Triplus ====
- Swim 500 meters
- Paddle on a paddleboard for 1000 meters
- Run 2000 meters

The event was won by Dean Linder-Leighton and Tia-Clair Toomey.

==== Event 9: Chaos ====
- 35/30 calories on a SkiErg
- 30/25 burpees with a set height target at the top
- 45/40 single-arm dumbbell overhead squats
- 40/45 alternating single-leg squats
- 25 box jump-overs
- 110-foot (34-meter) tumbler pull

This event was designed so that the athletes did not know the quantity or movement going into each station. On the SkiErg, burpees, and squats, the athletes were told to move to the next station only when they reached the specified quantity. They were told the quantity of box jumps once they reached the box. The men, who went second on the event, were sequestered so that they could not find out the movements.

The quantities varied between the men's and women's event. The men had 35 calories on the SkiErg, a machine built by Concept2 similar to their rowing machines but meant to simulate a cross-country skiing motion, and the women had 30. The burpees had 30 repetitions for the men and 25 for the women, as well as a higher target for the men. For the dumbbell overhead squats, the men had 45 while the women had 40 repetitions with a 50-pound (23-kilogram) and 35-pound (16-kilogram) dumbbell respectively. On the single-leg squats, the men had 40 while the women had 45. Both sexes had 25 box jumps, but the height for the women was 36 inches (91 centimeters) while the men had 42-inch (110-centimeter) tall boxes. The tumbler was a sand-filled barrel, 400 pounds (180 kilograms) and 300 pounds (140 kilograms) for the men and women respectively, attached to straps.

The event was won by Patrick Vellner and Katrín Davíðsdóttir.

==== Events 10 and 11: Bicouplet 1 and 2 ====
Bicouplet 2

- 12 snatches
- 12 bar muscle-ups
- 9 snatches
- 9 bar muscle-ups
- 6 snatches
- 6 bar muscle-ups

—Rest—

Bicouplet 1

- 21 snatches
- 21 chest-to-bar pull-ups
- 15 snatches
- 15 chest-to-bar pull-ups
- 9 snatches
- 9 chest-to-bar pull-ups

Each heat performed events 10 and 11 back-to-back with a short rest in between. The order of the two events was voted on by fans to decide if Bicouplet 1 or 2 would be performed first with Bicouplet 2 becoming chosen as event 10. The snatch weight for Bicouplet 2 was 135 pounds (61 kilograms) for men and 85 pounds (39 kilograms) for women. The snatch weight for Bicouplet 1 was 85 pounds (39 kilograms) for men and 55 pounds (25 kilograms) for women.

Event 10, Bicouplet 2, was won by Willy Georges and Camille Leblanc-Bazinet . Event 11, Bicouplet 1, was won by Rasmus Andersen and Kara Saunders.

=== Sunday, August 5, 2018 ===
==== Event 12: Two-Stroke Pull ====
Five rounds of:

- 300-meter run
- Assault Bike for calories, 20 for men and 15 for women
- 44-foot (13-meter) sled pull, 183 pounds (83 kilograms) for the men and 153 pounds (69 kilograms) for the women

The event was won by Lukas Högberg and Laura Horváth.

==== Event 13: Handstand Walk ====
As fast as possible, each competitor performed 50 double-unders with a heavy jump rope and then navigated an obstacle course while walking on their hands. The obstacles consisted of a pylon slalom, up and down a ramp, up and down stairs, and finished with a handstand walk across a set of parallel bars. Each individual obstacle had to be done without falling.

The event was won by Cody Anderson and Brooke Wells.

==== Event 14: Aeneas ====
- Peg board ascents, five for the men and four for the women
- 40 thrusters, 85 pounds (39 kilograms) for the men and 55 pounds (25 kilograms) for the women
- A yoke carry, adding weight every 33 feet (10 meters)

The event was a "chipper," a workout involving multiple exercises done sequentially without returning (as in "chipping away" at the number of repetitions) for the fastest time or as far as possible in the eight-minute time cap. The athletes started with climbing the peg board before moving on the thrusters, a CrossFit movement that is a combination of a front squat and push press in one continuous motion. After the thrusters the competitors picked up a yoke loaded with 425 pounds (193 kilograms) for the men or 345 pounds (156 kilograms) for the women. After 33 feet of carrying the yoke, the athletes had to stop and load their yokes to 565 pounds (256 kilograms) or 405 pounds (184 kilograms) for the men or women respectively. After another 33 feet, they loaded the yokes to 665 pounds (302 kilograms) or 445 pounds (202 kilograms) before carrying it another 33 feet to the finish line.

Having already secured first place overall in the 2018 Games, Mathew Fraser also finished first for this event. The women's event was won by Laura Horváth, who finished the 2018 Games as the second-place finisher overall, 64 points behind the Games winner Tia-Clair Toomey. Toomey finished second in the event. Laura Horvath was named Rookie of the Year.

== Team events ==
- Bike Deadlift
- The 30s
- Team Battleground
- 1RM Snatch
- Synchro Worm
- Team Triplus
- Handstand Bob
- Bob Sprint
- Bicouplet Relay
- Running Bob
- Lunging Worm

== Podium finishers ==
=== Individuals and teams ===
Place	Men	Women	Team
1st	Mathew Fraser	Tia-Clair Toomey	CrossFit Mayhem Freedom
2nd	Patrick Vellner	Laura Horváth	CrossFit Invictus X
3rd	Lukas Högberg (Note: Same score as Brent Fikowski but placed third via tiebreaker)	Katrín Davíðsdóttir	CrossFit OC3

=== Masters men ===
Place	35–39	40–44	45–49	50–54	55–59	60+
1st	Kyle Kasperbauer	Neal Maddox	Robert Davis	Cliff Musgrave	Brig Edwards	David Hippensteel
2nd	Alexandre Jolivet	David Levy (Note: Shawn Ramirez originally finished second but was later disqualified for testing positive for banned performance-enhancing substances. Levy and Grubb were moved up one position.)	Matthew Swift	Mike Egan	Shannon Aiken	Armando Garcia-Besne
3rd	Erast Palkin	Jason Grubb	Nathan Loren	Ron Ortiz	Will Powell	Cal Cherrington

=== Masters women ===
Place	35–39	40–44	45–49	50–54	55–59	60+
1st	Anna Tobias	Stephanie Roy	Amanda Allen	Eva Thornton	Mary Beth Prodromides	Shaun Havard
2nd	Samantha Briggs	Kelly Friel	Tonia Osborne	Laurie Meschishnick	Bianca Willams	Patty Failla
3rd	Helena Falk	Joey Kimdon	Jolaine Undershute	Linda Elstun	Colleen Fahey	Dolores Jones

=== Teens ===
Place	14–15 Boys	14–15 Girls	16–17 Boys	16–17 Girls
1st	Tudor Magda	Olivia Sulek	Dallin Pepper	Haley Adams
2nd	Christian Gallaher	Lea Malo	Vincent Ramirez	Kaela Stephano
3rd	Nolan Pedrick	Paige Powers	Dylan Kade	Chloe Smith
