= Tia-Clair Toomey =

Australian weightlifter (born 1993)

Tia-Clair Toomey AM
Personal information
- Born: 22 July 1993 (age 33) Nambour, Queensland, Australia
- Height: 163 cm (5 ft 4 in)
- Weight: 58 kg (128 lb)
- Spouse: Shane Orr

Sport
- Sport: CrossFit, weightlifting
- Club: CrossFit PRVN
- Coached by: Shane Orr

Achievements and titles
- Olympic finals: 2016 Summer Olympics
Medal record
CrossFit
CrossFit Games
Gold medal – first place	2017	Women
Gold medal – first place	2018	Women
Gold medal – first place	2019	Women
Gold medal – first place	2020	Women
Gold medal – first place	2021	Women
Gold medal – first place	2022	Women
Gold medal – first place	2024	Women
Gold medal – first place	2025	Women
Silver medal – second place	2015	Women
Silver medal – second place	2016	Women
Wodapalooza CrossFit Festival
Gold medal – first place	2019	Women
Gold medal – first place	2020	Women
Rogue Invitational
Gold medal – first place	2019	Women
Gold medal – first place	2020	Women
Gold medal – first place	2021	Women
Gold medal – first place	2024	Women
Silver medal – second place	2023	Women
Women's weightlifting
Representing Australia
Commonwealth Games
Gold medal – first place	2018 Gold Coast	58 kg
Pacific Games
Silver medal – second place	2015 Port Moresby	58 kg
Oceania Championships
Silver medal – second place	2015 Port Moresby	58 kg
Bronze medal – third place	2016 Suva	58 kg

Tia-Clair Toomey-Orr AM (née Toomey; born 22 July 1993) is an Australian weightlifter and CrossFit Games athlete. After winning her eighth title at the 2025 CrossFit Games, Toomey has more title wins than any other athlete in the short history of the sport. She also won the gold medal in the women's 58 kg (128 lb) Weightlifting event at the 2018 Commonwealth Games in the Gold Coast.

Toomey also competed in the women's 58 kg (128 lb) event at the 2016 Summer Olympics and came in 14th. At the CrossFit Games, Toomey was runner-up in 2015 and 2016, before becoming winner of the 2017, 2018, 2019, 2020, 2021, 2022, 2024, and 2025 CrossFit Games.

== Early life ==
Tia-Clair Toomey was born on 22 July 1993 to Debbi and Brendon Toomey in Nambour, Queensland, Australia, the eldest of three girls. She grew up in Dunethin Rock along the Maroochy River on the Sunshine Coast, where her parents worked on a cane farm. She attended a primary school in North Arm, Queensland. When she was 12, the family moved to Weipa after the sugarcane mill closed. She studied at Western Cape College in Weipa, and then boarded at the Townsville Grammar School in Townsville in 2009. After finishing school in 2011, she went to study nursing at Queensland University of Technology in Brisbane. However, she left after six months and moved to Gladstone to be with her future husband Shane Orr. There she worked for a time as a dental assistant, and then as a lab technician at a Rio Tinto facility.

Toomey competed in athletics as a runner while she was at school. When she was in Gladstone, she focused on 400m hurdling, and was introduced to CrossFit by Shane Orr who had used it to supplement his training while he was playing for Gladstone Rugby Union. She joined a CrossFit gym and became involved in the sport; soon after she started participating in CrossFit competitions in 2013. She learned the basics of weightlifting through her CrossFit classes.

== Competitions ==
=== CrossFit Games ===
Toomey first competed in the CrossFit Open less than a month after learning CrossFit in 2013. The following year she qualified for the Regionals, but was only ranked 18th in the Australian Regional. Toomey first qualified for the CrossFit Games in 2015 after two years of CrossFit competitions. She finished runner-up to Katrín Davíðsdóttir in her debut year, and was named Rookie of the Year.

At the 2016 CrossFit Games, the women's competition was tightly fought between Davíðsdóttir and Toomey, but Toomey was again placed second after Davíðsdóttir managed to hold off a strong challenge from Toomey to win a second time.

The 2017 CrossFit Games was again a close-fought competition, this time between Toomey and fellow Australian Kara Webb. Significantly, Webb was penalized after a judging error which resulted in dropped points for Webb in the penultimate event. Toomey won her first Games in a tight finish, beating Webb by only two points.

At the 2018 Games, Toomey won convincingly with a 64-point lead over second-place Laura Horvath. The following year in the 2019 Games, she won with a large margin of 195 points over Kristin Holte, and became the first woman to win three CrossFit Games.

In 2020, Toomey extended her record to four consecutive wins. Her performance in 2020 was the most dominant display ever by a female CrossFit athlete at the Games, winning nine of the 12 events in the final stage at the Games, with a margin of victory of 360 points over Katrín Davíðsdóttir.

Toomey further extended the number of titles won to five at the 2021 CrossFit Games with another dominant display, winning nine of 15 events at the Games and setting a record score of 1,435. The five wins equalled the record set by Mat Fraser, and she also broke Fraser's record of 29 total event wins by setting a new record of 33 event wins.

Toomey won her sixth title, and $310,000 prize money, at the 2022 CrossFit Games. Her win made her the only person to win six individual CrossFit Games title. She placed first in two of 13 events at the competition.

Prior to the 2023 CrossFit Games, Toomey indicated that she would not compete that year due to her pregnancy; nevertheless, she took part in the Open that season while pregnant.

Toomey returned next year at the 2024 CrossFit Games and won her seventh title, extending her record of the most number of title wins among both males and females, and again at the 2025 CrossFit Games.

=== Olympics ===
Toomey lifted her then-best 85 kg (187 lb) clean and jerk at a CrossFit competition in September 2013 after training for only 6 months, and her performance caught the attention of the weightlifting coach Miles Wydall. He later offered to coach Toomey on weightlifting and encouraged Toomey to try to get to the Rio Olympics representing Australia. After just 18 months of serious weightlifting training, she qualified for the Olympics when she finished third at the 2016 Oceania Weightlifting Championships with a combined lift of 194 kg (428 lb). In the Olympic weightlifting competition at the 2016 Summer Olympics, she competed in the Women's 58 kg division, but missed her personal best by 5 kg (11 lb) and finished 14th.

In December 2020, Toomey announced her plan to train with the Australian bobsleigh team and try to qualify for the 2022 Winter Olympics in China. In her first bobsled competition in South Korea in February 2021, she won two races as brakewoman in a two-woman bobsled team. Her team qualified for the Winter Olympic in January 2022, however, they were not selected for the Australian team due to regulations that the new event monobob and the two-woman team must have the same driver, and the monobob driver Bree Walker was favoured and chosen.

=== Commonwealth Games ===
Toomey also competed in weightlifting at the 2018 Commonwealth Games. She won gold in the 58 kg (128 lb) event with a combined total of 201 kg (443 lb).

=== Hyrox ===
In late 2024, Toomey started participating in Hyrox competitions. She teamed up with James Newbury to compete in the Mixed Doubles division and finished second at Hyrox Brisbane in March 2025. Two weeks later, she and Joanna Wietrzyk then set a world record with a time of 54:24 in the Women's Doubles division at Hyrox Houston.

== Personal life ==
Toomey met her husband and coach, Shane Orr, while she was still in high school and they were both participating in a local triathlon event in Weipa, later introduced to each other at a fishing competition. They married in 2017. Toomey announced her pregnancy in December 2022, and that she would not compete in the 2023 Games. Her daughter Willow was born on 9 May 2023, and her son Koda in May 2026.

Toomey and Orr owned a gym in Gladstone, which they sold in early 2019 after they moved to Cookeville, Tennessee in early October 2018 to train at Rich Froning's gym CrossFit Mayhem. Multiple CrossFit Games male champion, Mat Fraser, then trained with them in Cookeville and Shane coached both of them in preparation for the 2019 and 2020 CrossFit Games. She moved in 2021 to East Nashville, Tennessee used as a base for PRVN Fitness training camp where her husband is head coach.

She appeared in a Super Bowl LV commercial along with fellow CrossFitter Josh Bridges.

On April 16, 2025, Toomey announced in a YouTube video that she would be stepping away from the sport of CrossFit after competing in the Torian Pro in May 2025.

== CrossFit Games results ==
Year	Games	Regionals		Open (Worldwide)
2013	—	—		5954th
2014	—	18th (Australia)		241st
2015	2nd	3rd (Pacific)		63rd
2016	2nd	2nd (Pacific)		82nd
2017	1st	2nd (Pacific)		18th
2018	1st	1st (Pacific)		12th
Year	Games	Qualifier		Open
2019	1st	1st (WZA); 1st (Rogue)		6th (world); 1st (Australia)
2020	1st	1st (Mayhem); 1st (WZA)		4th (world); 1st (Australia)
Year	Games	Semifinals	Quarterfinals	Open
2021	1st	1st (Mid-Atlantic)	1st (Oceania)	1st (world); 1st (Oceania)
2022	1st	1st (Torian Pro)	1st (Worldwide); 1st (Oceania)	2nd (Worldwide); 1st (Oceania)
2023	Did not compete (pregnancy)			2831st (Worldwide); 213th (Oceania)
2024	1st	1st	28th (Worldwide); 7th (North America East)	2610th (Worldwide); 656th (North America East)
2025	1st	1st (Torian Pro)		144th (Worldwide); 40th (North America East)

== Weightlifting Achievements ==
Year	Venue	Weight	Snatch (kg)				Clean & Jerk (kg)				Total	Rank
Year	Venue	Weight	1	2	3	Rank	1	2	3	Rank	Total	Rank
Summer Olympics
2016	Rio, Brazil	57.70kg	78	~~82~~	82	—N/a	103	107	~~112~~	—N/a	189	14
World Championships
2015	Houston, United States	55.80 kg	78	82	~~85~~	29	98	105	~~112~~	24	187	26

== Honours and awards ==
- Sports Illustrated, Fittest 50: 2022 (No. 1)
- Member of the Order of Australia (2025) for "significant service to crossfit and weightlifting"
