= 2020 CrossFit Games =

Athletic competition

- Venue: CrossFit Ranch
- Location: Aromas, California
- Dates: October 23–25, 2020

Champions
- Men: (United States) Mat Fraser
- Women: (Australia) Tia-Clair Toomey

The 2020 CrossFit Games was the 14th CrossFit Games held on October 23–25, 2020, at the CrossFit Ranch in Aromas, California, United States. Mathew Fraser and Tia-Clair Toomey were again the respective winners of this year's men and women competitions

The COVID-19 pandemic in 2020 forced major changes to the Games season, including the postponement and relocation of the Games. The format was altered, and only 30 men and 30 women were invited to compete in an online-only first stage with the top five men and women qualifying for the final stage to compete in person. There were no teams, masters, or teens events. The Games returned to live broadcast on CBS Sports after the 2019 Games when only online streaming was available.

This year both Fraser and Toomey produced the most dominant performances the Games have ever seen: Fraser won 10 of the 12 events in the last stage of the competition, while Toomey won 9. They set a further series of records in their respective competitions, such as their margin of victory, the number of consecutive event wins and cumulative event wins. This was Fraser's fifth consecutive Games title, overtaking Rich Froning's record of four, and Toomey's fourth, a new record for the women's competition.

== Qualification and format changes ==
The 2020 qualifying events started with the Open held in October and November 2019—the date had been moved forward from previous Opens which were usually held in February/March. As with previous seasons, the Open lasted five weeks from October 10 to November 11, 2019, with a workout released every week. A total of 239,106 athletes registered for the Open, a drop of a third from the previous year, which has been attributed to the change in date and withdrawal of CrossFit from the main social media platforms this year. The Open was won by Patrick Vellner and Sara Sigmundsdóttir.

The Sanctional events began in November 2019, and the events proceeded as scheduled until March 2020 when the effects of the COVID-19 pandemic caused Sanctioned events to be postponed and then canceled amidst social distancing requirements, bans on large gatherings of people, and travel restrictions for international competitors. The Games were initially scheduled to be held from July 29 to August 2 in Madison, Wisconsin, but the Games were postponed a few times, and as spectators were not allowed at many venues during the pandemic, the final stage moved to the CrossFit Ranch in Aromas where the Games were first held from 2007 to 2009. Originally 332 athletes, including 239 previously invited national champions, would have participated in the Games, but due to the pandemic, only the top 20 men and women from the Open and 10 Sanctional champions from Sanction events that took place were invited. The pandemic also necessitated major changes to the format and a reduction in scale, including the removal of the teams, masters, and teens events.

The Games were split into two stages. In the first stage held from September 18–19, 60 invited athletes (30 men and 30 women) from around the world competed online in their own homes or in local gyms. Rankings for the athletes were determined at the end of the first stage; those placed number 6 to number 20 received prize money, while the top five men and women proceeded to the second stage for the final events in Aromas to compete in person. Due to the smaller number of competitors, most events did not have a time cap, but a "full effort" rule was introduced where athletes would receive zero points if they were judged to be not giving their full effort. Scores from the first stage were not carried over to the second stage, and the scoring system in the second stage was also changed due to fewer competitors, with 100 points awarded to the winner of an event, and 75, 55, 35, 15/0 for the second to fifth placings.

== Stage 1 ==
There were two stages in the 2020 CrossFit Games consisting of only the individual events. In the first stage, seven events were held over two days in September where 30 men and 30 women competed from their own gyms or local CrossFit affiliates to determine the five men and women who would compete in the second stage of the finals. Each athlete was judged by a member of CrossFit's seminar staff, and their performances were recorded and sent online to the CrossFit headquarters. Four events were held on the first day (September 18), three the next (September 19). The seven events were:

- Friendly Fran – 21 thrusters, 21 chest-to-bar pull-ups (Women 85lb / Men 115lb)
- 1RM Front Squat – one-rep max front squat in 20 minutes
- Damn Diane – 15 deadlifts, 15 strict deficit handstand push-ups (Women 205lb, 2" deficit / Men 315lb, 3.5" deficit)
- 1,000-m row
- Nasty Nancy – 5 rounds of 500m run, 15 overhead squats, 15 bar-facing burpees (Women 125lb / Men 185lb)
- Handstand Hold – hold for as long as possible, can make as many attempts as desired within a 20-minute window
- Awful Annie – 50 reps of double unders with a heavy rope, 50 GHD sit ups, 5 cleans (Women 185lb / Men 275lb), followed by 40 double unders and sits ups and four cleans, then 30 and three, 20 and two, and 10 and one.

Mat Fraser won four of the seven events, while Tia-Clair Toomey won the first three events in a row. Toomey also won the last event; Kara Saunders was initially announced the winner, but the error was later corrected. The ten finalists were Fraser, Noah Ohlsen, Justin Medeiros, Samuel Kwant, and Jeffrey Adler for the men, and Toomey, Brooke Wells, Haley Adams, Katrín Davíðsdóttir, and Kari Pearce for the women. Justin Medeiros, who at 21 was the youngest competitor in the men's field, was named Rookie of the Year.

== Stage 2 ==
The ten athletes competed in 12 events over three days (October 23–25) at the CrossFit Ranch, but some events held at the Morgan Hill Aquatics Center and Morgan Hill Sports Complex. Scoring was reset in the second stage, with greater differences in points won for individual rankings from first to fifth.

=== Friday, October 23, 2020 ===
The first two events were held at the CrossFit Ranch, the next two at Morgan Hill Outdoor Sports Center, before returning to CrossFit Ranch for the final event.

- Event 1: 2007 Reload – 1500-meter row, then five rounds of 10 bar muscle-ups and 7 shoulder-to-overheads (Women 145 / Men 235 lb.) This event is a modification of the first event of the 2007 CrossFit Games.
- Event 2: Corn Sack Sprint – a 320-meter hill sprint with a corn sack (Women 30 lb. / Men 50 lb.)
- Event 3: CrossFit Total – 1-rep-max back squat, 1-rep-max shoulder press, a 1-rep-max deadlift
- Event 4: Handstand Sprint – 100-yard sprint on hands
- Event 5: Ranch Loop – 3-mile loop. An unexpected twist was added and athletes had to run back to finish

=== Saturday, October 24, 2020 ===
First three events held at Morgan Hill Sports Complex, last event at CrossFit Ranch

- Event 6: Toes-to-Bar/Lunge – 30-20-10 rep scheme of toes-to-bars and kettlebell lunges
- Event 7: Snatch Speed Triple – weightlifting speed ladders (Women 145 to 185 lb. / Men 225 to 285 lb.)
- Event 8: Bike Repeater – 10 rounds of a 440-meter bike sprint and 1 legless rope climb
- Event 9: Happy Star – Four rounds of hill loops, burpees and thrusters. The run course changed and the reps and weight increased in each round.

=== Sunday, October 25, 2020 ===
First two events held at Morgan Hill Aquatics Center and Morgan Hill Sports Complex

- Event 10: Swim 'N' Stuff – 4 rounds of (women 10/men 15) calories on Air Bike, 50-meter swim, 10 GHD sit-ups, and 10 ball slams (Women 40 / Men 60 lb.).
- Event 11: Sprint Sled Sprint – a 100-yard sled push between two 100-yard sprints
- Event 12: Atalanta – 1-mile run, 100 handstand push-ups, 200 single-leg squats, 300 pull-ups, and another 1-mile run, all while wearing a weight vest (Woman 14 / Men 20 lb.).

Fraser won ten of the twelve events, while Toomey won nine. Fraser won with the biggest margin in history (545 points); his points total of 1,150 was nearly doubled that of that the runner-up Samuel Kwant (605). Fraser was only beaten to second place by Kwant in Swim 'N' Stuff, and Jeffrey Adler in CrossFit Total. In the women's competition, all events were won by Toomey apart from Katrín Davíðsdóttir winning on Ranch Loop, Brooke Wells on Handstand Sprint, and Kari Pearce on Atalanta. Toomey margin of victory of 360 was also a record for the women's competition.

Fraser's fifth win in the CrossFit Games overtook Froning's record of four, while Toomey's fourth win set a record for the women. Both Fraser and Toomey also set a series of further records, such as the most number of event wins in a Games (14 for Fraser including stage 1, 13 for Toomey), most number of cumulative event wins (29 for Fraser, 24 for Toomey), and most consecutive event wins in a single Games (6 for both).

== Podium finishers ==
Place	Men	Women
1st	(United States) Mathew Fraser	(Australia) Tia-Clair Toomey
2nd	(United States) Samuel Kwant	(Iceland) Katrín Davíðsdóttir
3rd	(United States) Justin Medeiros	(United States) Kari Pearce
