= Hand walking =

Form of human locomotion with all body weight resting on the hands

An acro dancer handwalks across the stage.

Hand walking is an unusual form of human locomotion in which a person travels in a vertically inverted orientation with all body weight resting on the hands. It can be executed with legs fully extended or with variations such as stag, straddle or front splits. Hand walking is performed in various athletic activities, including acro dance and circus acrobatics.

== Skills and technique ==
Hand walking is a skill that relies on a prerequisite ability to perform handstands, which in turn requires adequate upper body pressing strength in the deltoids and triceps as well as a heightened sense of balance and spatial awareness. Because the body is inverted during hand walking, blood pressure in the brain is greater than normal.

Hand walking often elicits automatic, alternating leg movements similar to upright bipedal locomotion. Research shows that these leg movements are caused in part by neural coupling between arm and legs.

As with other physical skills, one must practice hand walking in order to become proficient and develop adequate endurance. Handstands and hand walking are often learned at the same time because hand walking can be used to help maintain balance in a handstand before one learns to perform a stable handstand. Balance can also be maintained by varying the arch of the back.

== In non-human animals ==
Some quadrupeds are able to walk bipedally on their forelimbs, thus performing "hand" walking in an anthropomorphic sense. For example, when attacked, the spotted skunk may rear up and move about on its forelimbs so that its anal glands, capable of spraying an offensive oil, are directed towards the attacker. Dogs, cats and sea lions can also be trained to walk on their forelimbs.

== See also ==
- Animal locomotion
- Terrestrial locomotion
