= Vellner =

Vellner is a surname. Notable people with the surname include:

- Patrick Vellner (born 1990), Canadian CrossFit athlete
- Ruth Katharina Vellner (1922–2012), Estonian breaststroke swimmer
