= Ruth Katharina Vellner =

Estonian swimmer

Personal information
- Born: November 22, 1922 Tallinn, Estonia
- Died: January 7, 2012 (aged 89) Stockholm, Sweden

Sport
- Sport: Swimming

Ruth Katharina Vellner (until 1944 Käsnapuu; surname also written as Käsnapuu-Welner or Velner; 22 November 1922 Tallinn – 7 January 2012 Stockholm) was an Estonian breaststroke swimmer. She is considered as one of the greatest Estonian female swimmers.

She started her swimming training in 1929 under the guidance of Herbert Rachmann. 1938-1943 she became 6-times Estonian champion in different swimming disciplines 1937-1940 she was a member of Estonian national swimming team.

In 1943 she moved to Sweden.
