= CrossFit Games =

Annual athletic competition in America

The Crossfit Games
- Current season, competition or edition: 2026 CrossFit Games
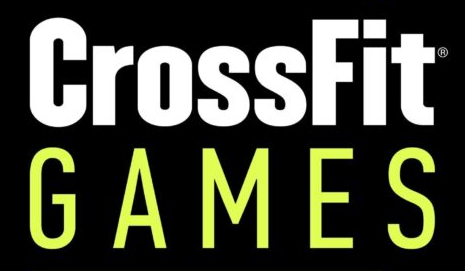
- Sport: CrossFit
- Founded: 2007
- Owner: CrossFit LLC
- Director: Dave Castro
- Competitors: 30 men, 30 women, 20 teams, 10 every age division
- Venues: Aromas ranch, California; Home Depot Center, Carson, California; Alliant Energy Center, Madison, Wisconsin; Dickies Arena, Fort Worth, Texas; MVP Arena, Albany, New York; SAP Center, San Jose, California
- Most recent champions: James Sprague (men); Aimee Cringle (women); CrossFit Whip (team)
- Most titles: Mat Fraser (men); Tia-Clair Toomey (women); CrossFit Mayhem (team)
- Qualification: CrossFit Open, Quarterfinals, Semifinals
- Sponsors: Reebok (2011–2020); NoBull (2021–2023)
- Related competitions: Rogue Invitational, Wodapalooza
- Website: CrossFit Games

The CrossFit Games is an annual athletic competition owned and operated by CrossFit, LLC. Athletes compete in a series of events at the Games, which may be various standard CrossFit workouts consisting of metabolic conditioning exercises, weightlifting, and gymnastics movements, as well as a range of activities from other sports such as swimming, road cycling and strongman. The events generally are not revealed before the Games, can include unexpected elements to challenge the athletes' readiness to compete, and they are designed to test the athletes' fitness using CrossFit's own criteria. Winners of the CrossFit Games earn cash prizes and the title of "Fittest on Earth."

The competition started in 2007 and has been held every year since, normally in the summer. The first competition was held at a ranch in Aromas, California, with small groups of participants and spectators, but the CrossFit Games rapidly grew, and within a few years, the competition was moved to larger venues at the Home Depot Center in Carson, California, followed by the Alliant Energy Center in Madison, Wisconsin. It was held in the Dickies Arena in Fort Worth, Texas in 2024. The Games were sponsored by Reebok from 2011 to 2020, and by Nobull from 2021 to 2023.

The CrossFit Games season consists of four stages; the first qualification stage, the Open, is billed as the largest participatory sporting event in the world, with over 415,000 athletes signing up to compete in 2018. The number of participants are reduced in further qualification events to 30 men, 30 women and 20 teams, who go on to compete at the CrossFit Games. A few athletes have dominated in the Games' history; they are Rich Froning (four wins) and Mat Fraser (five wins) in the men's competition, and Tia-Clair Toomey (eight wins) in the women's.

== History ==
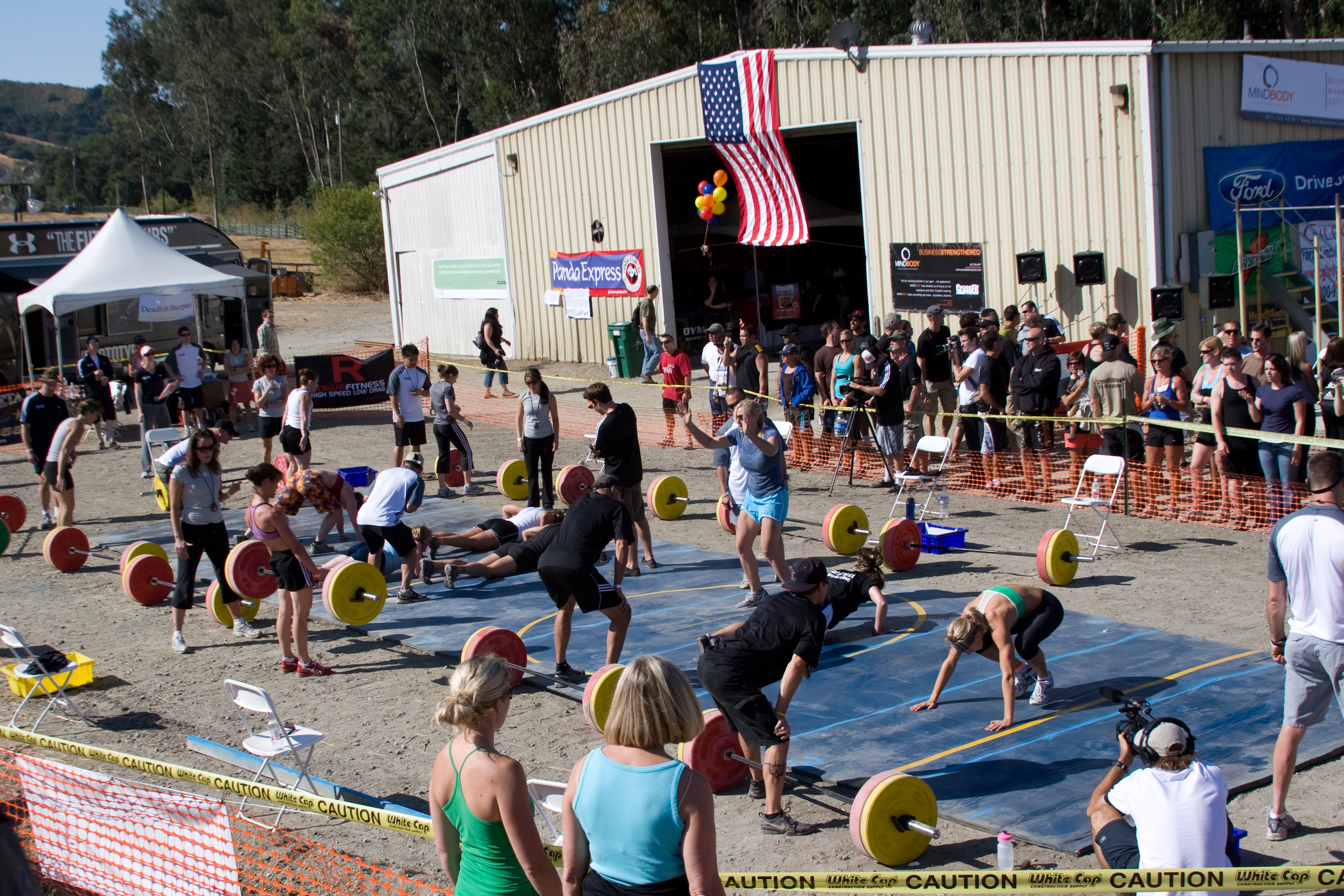
The 2008 CrossFit Games held at the ranch in Aromas, California

The CrossFit Games has its origin in early 2007 when the then director of training of CrossFit Dave Castro invited CrossFit founder Greg Glassman to his family ranch in Aromas, California, and Glassman suggested holding a "Woodstock of Fitness" at the ranch for the CrossFit community. In July 2007, the inaugural CrossFit Games took place at the ranch in Aromas. The first Games had the feel of a backyard barbecue with a few sporting events thrown in, and around 70 athletes and 150 spectators turned up for the competition. For the first two years of competition, participation was open to anyone who showed up at Aromas. The athletes with the best individual combined score in a series of events would be crowned the winners, and an Affiliate Cup was also awarded to the group from one CrossFit gym that had the best combined individual standings.

The number of participants increased rapidly in the following years, and in 2009, a qualification stage called the Regionals was introduced to select the best competitors for the Games. The CrossFit Games also added a separate set of team-based events for the Affiliate Cup, marking the first use of a designated Team Division, competed by teams of four (two men and two women). This year, spectators at the Games had grown to an expected 2,500.

=== Carson, California era ===
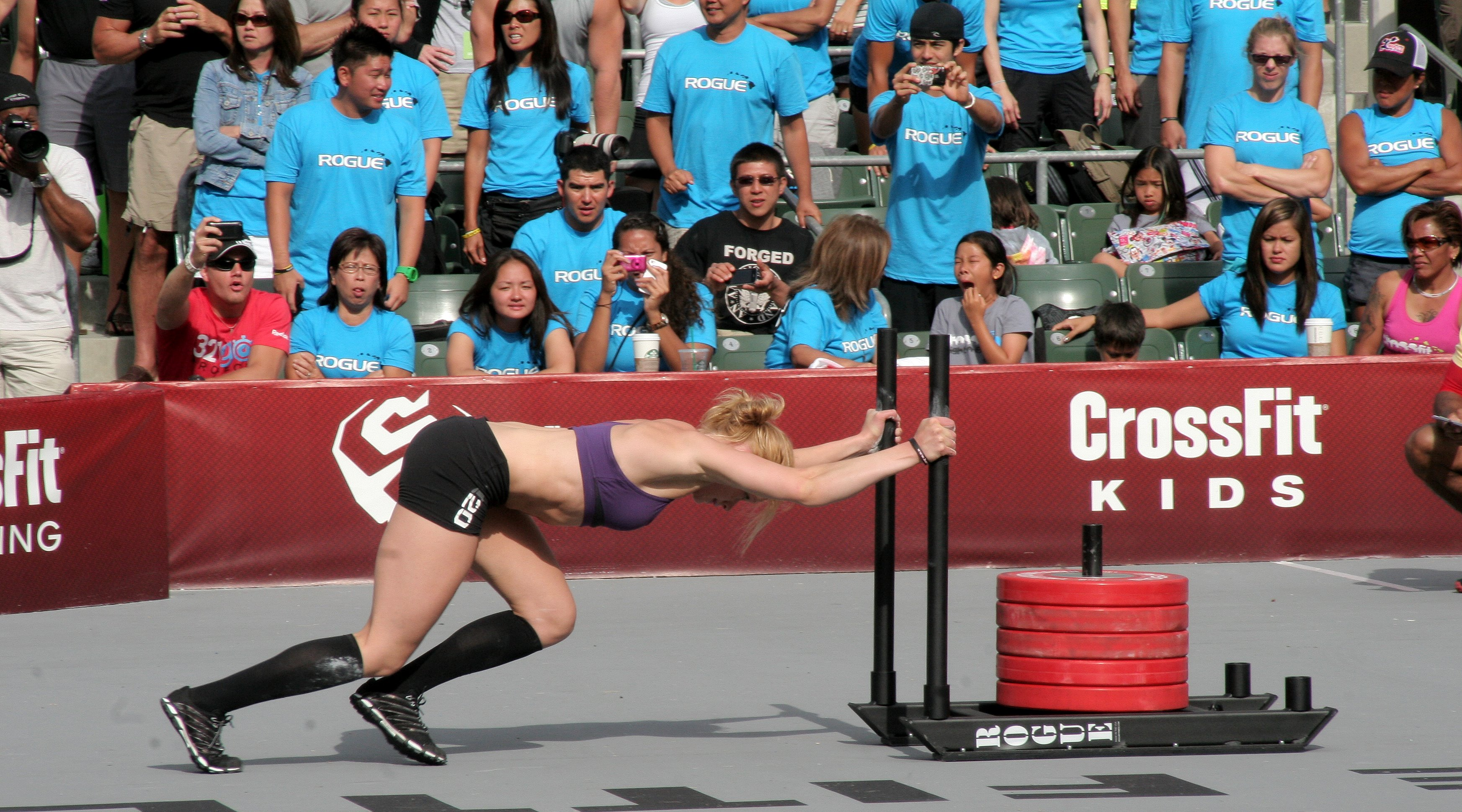
Annie Thorisdottir at the Home Depot Center tennis stadium in 2011 in Carson, California, venue for the Games from 2010 to 2016

Interest and attendance at the Games outgrew the ranch in Aromas, and in 2010 the Games venue was moved to the Home Depot Center in Carson, California. Participation in the event continued to grow, and the qualification for the 2010 Games was adjusted to include multiple Sectionals, a series of events open to all athletes who wanted to qualify for one of the 17 Regionals. The 17 regions divided Canada and the United States into 12 regions, with the remaining regions roughly corresponding to the five other populated continents. The Games also expanded the Team Division to groups of six athletes and added a Masters Division for individual men and women aged 55 and up.

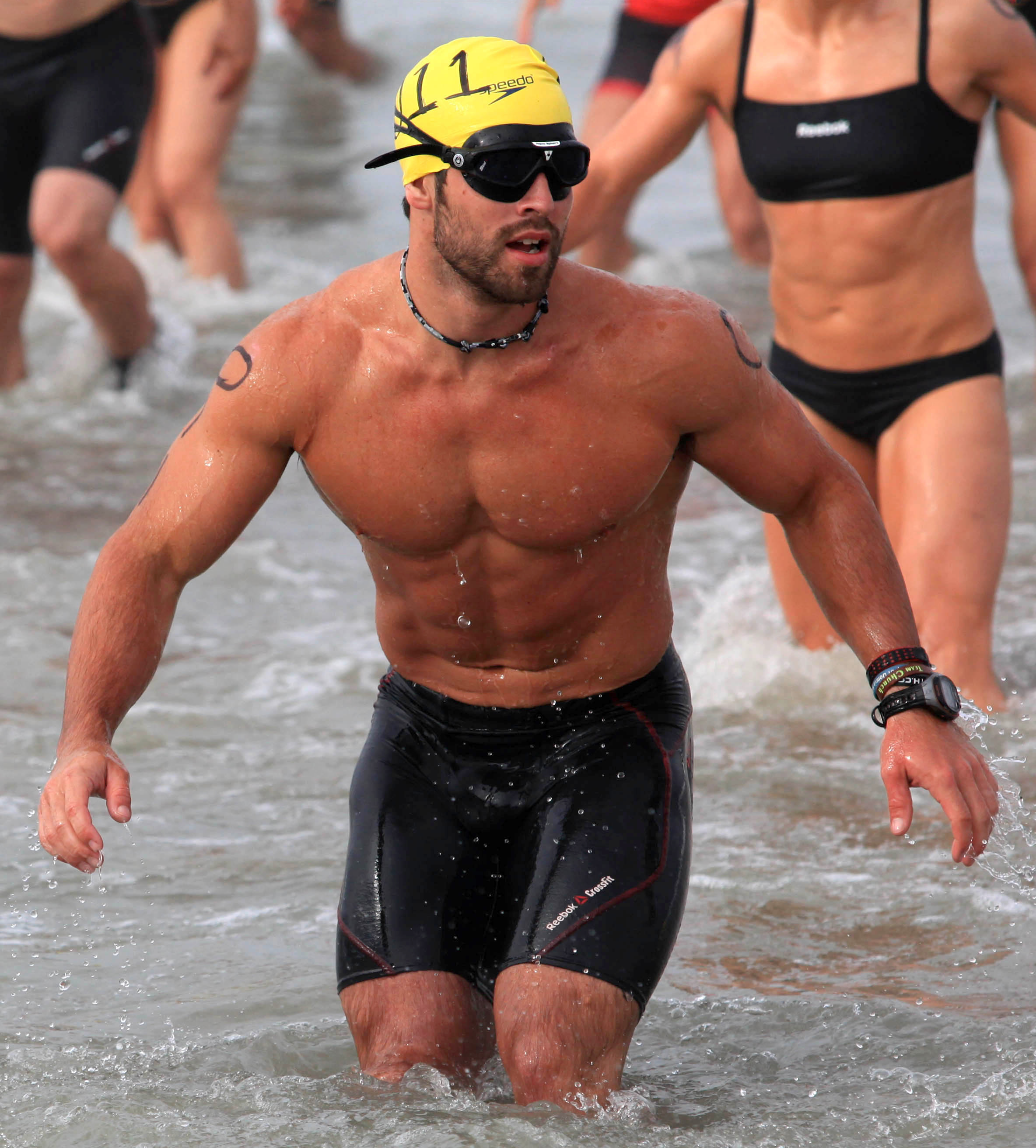
Rich Froning in an ocean swim event at the 2012 CrossFit Games

In 2011, the open participation Sectionals were replaced by an online qualification called the Open. In the first year of the Open, 26,000 athletes signed up to compete. Participation in the Open steadily increased, rising from 69,000 in 2012 to 209,585 in 2014. The Open has since been described as the largest participatory sporting event in the world, reaching a peak of 415,000 participants in 2018. The number of registered athletes in the Open declined in the next two years down to 239,106 in 2020, which may be due to changes of the 2019 Games and the scheduling of the 2020 Open, but has steadily increased in the following years, to over 323,000 in 2023.

In 2015, the qualification format was reorganized from 17 Regionals to eight "Super-Regionals". Each Super-Regional included qualifiers from two or three of the previously defined regions, with a total of 40 or 50 athletes participating at each event. From these Super-Regionals, 40 men, 40 women, and 40 teams went on to participate at the Games.

=== Madison, Wisconsin era ===
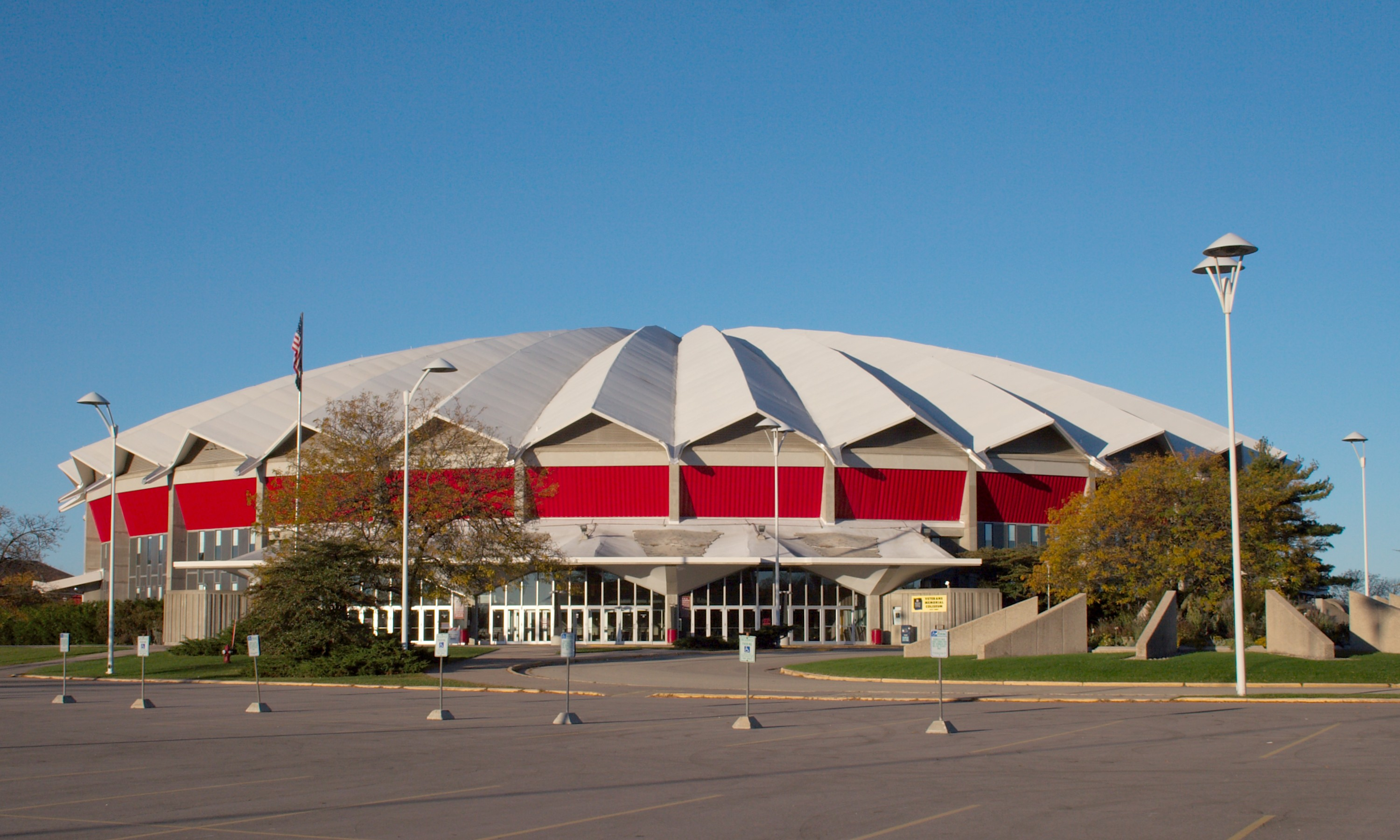
Alliant Energy Center in Madison, Wisconsin, venue for the Games from 2017 to 2019 and 2021 to 2023

Following seven years in Carson, the Games moved to the grounds of the Alliant Energy Center in Madison, Wisconsin, in 2017. The next year, the qualifying Regionals were once again realigned to reflect the increasing competitiveness and popularity outside of Canada and the U.S. In 2018, there were nine Regionals hosted among 18 redefined regions, with Europe increasing to three regions, Central America split from South America, and the elimination of the Northern and Southern California regions.

CrossFit, Inc. founder Greg Glassman overhauled the format for the 2019 Games, replacing the Regionals with CrossFit-sanctioned international qualifying events called Sanctionals. As part of the changes, the 2019 Games athletes can qualify by winning one of the Sanctionals, or were the top athlete from one of the recognized countries in the CrossFit Open, or a top-20 overall finisher in the CrossFit Open, or by being one of the up to four at-large athletes chosen by CrossFit. Teams also no longer needed to be created from one CrossFit-affiliated gym and could be formed from any group of four competitors.

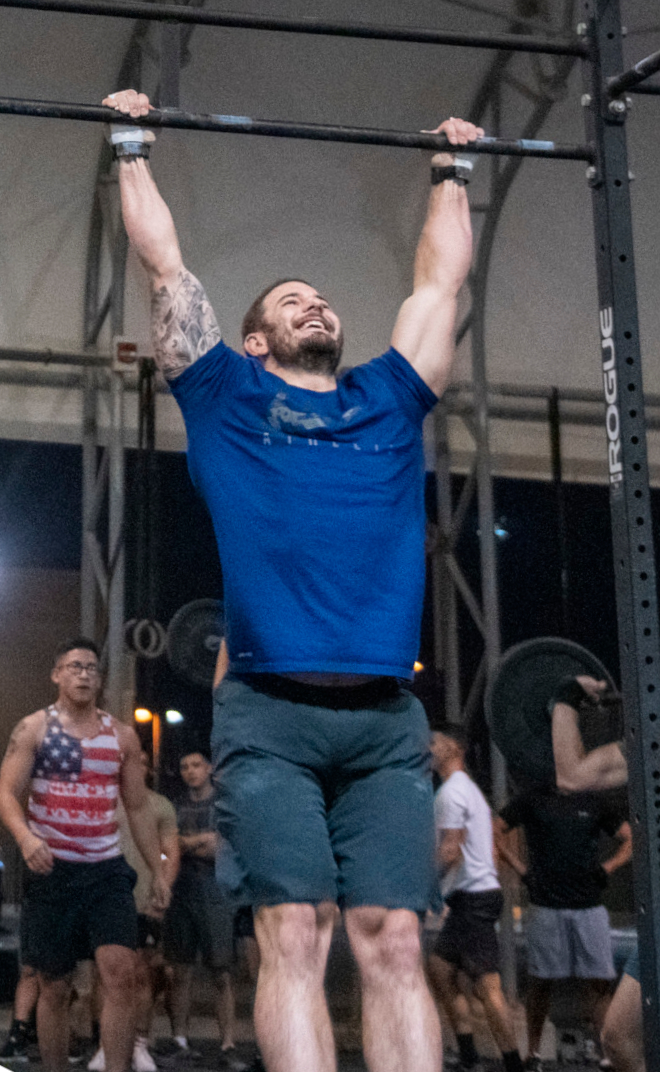
Mat Fraser, athlete with the most wins in the Men's competition

In 2020, the qualifying events proceeded as scheduled until March 2020 when the COVID-19 pandemic caused events to be cancelled amid social distancing requirements and travel restrictions. The Games format was altered, and 30 men and 30 women were invited to compete in an online-only first stage with the top five qualifying for the final stage. As no spectators were allowed at any venue during the pandemic, the final stage was hosted at its original location at the CrossFit Ranch in Aromas. There were no teams, masters, or teens events.

In 2021, the qualification format was adjusted with the introduction of a new online Quarterfinal stage. However, the Games also removed the national champion so as to have a smaller field of invitees to the Games. Ten Semi-finals that are a mix of the Regionals and Sanctionals were also introduced, as well as a final last-chance online qualifier for semi-final athletes who narrowly missed Games qualification. The Games also returned the team format to affiliate-based qualification, and added a new adaptive athlete division.

In January 2022, CrossFit CEO Eric Roza dismissed CrossFit Games' director Dave Castro after 15 years of programming the event, replacing him with Justin Bergh as general manager of sport and Adrian Bozman as director of competition. Castro later returned as leader of the sport team in 2023.

A worldwide ranking of athletes was introduced for the 2023 Games based on the performance of the athletes in all stages of the previous two Games. This ranking system would be used to determine any additional qualifying spots for the CrossFit Games in a revamped qualification process.

=== Fort Worth, Texas, Albany, New York, and San Jose, California ===
For the 2024 season, the CrossFit Games were held in the Dickies Arena in Fort Worth, Texas after 6 years in Madison, Wisconsin. In that season the Games focused on the individual and team divisions, with all the other divisions split off into their own separate competitions. The Games, however, were marred by the death of the Serbian athlete Lazar Đukić, who drowned in the first event, which led to the withdrawal of a number of athletes, including both 2023 champions Laura Horvath and Jeffrey Adler.

After only a year in Fort Worth, the Games were moved to Albany, New York for the 2025 season. Other changes were made this season, including the removal of the quarterfinals (restored in 2026), and only 30 men, 30 women and 20 teams can qualify for the Games. In 2026, for the 20th anniversary, the Games return to California where the competition was held at the SAP Center in San Jose.

=== Sponsorship and prize money ===
CrossFit Games logos with names of sponsors

2011–2020 with Reebok

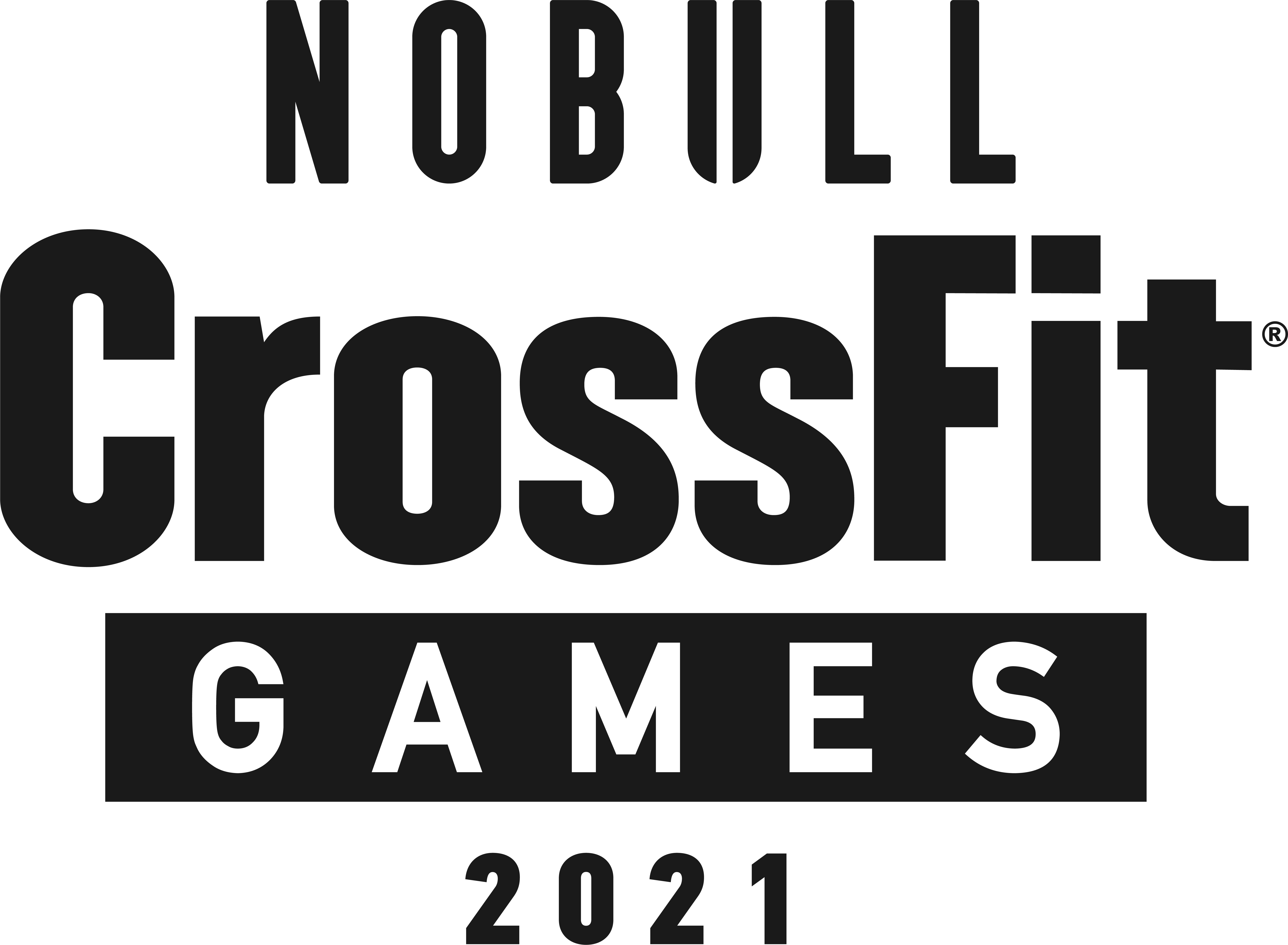
2021–2023 with NoBull

Participation and sponsorship have grown rapidly since the inception of the Games. The Games has always awarded an equal sum in prize money to the male and female individual winners, starting with $500 at the inaugural Games, increasing to $300,000 in 2019. The prize purse of the 2010 Games was sponsored by Progenex that provided $25,000 for the winners. The following year saw the largest jump in prize money when Reebok sponsored its first Games, and the prize money for first place in 2011 increased to $250,000. The total prize payout in 2016 was $2,200,000, rising to 3 million in 2020. The prize payout increased again in 2021 when NoBull became the title sponsor of the Games. There was no title sponsor for the 2024 CrossFit Games.

== Qualification ==
The CrossFit Games is the culmination of the CrossFit season that starts with the qualification stage. In the first two CrossFit Games, no qualification for competitors was necessary; athletes who wanted to participate in the Games could register and turn up on the day to compete. However, with an increasing number of participants, a qualification process, the Regionals, was initiated in 2009 to winnow down the number of athletes who could take part in the Games. This was further expanded into a two-stage process in 2010 with the introduction of Sectionals where competitors were first selected to compete in the Regionals. The Sectionals became the Open the following year, and between 2011 and 2018, all athletes had to go through the same two-stage qualification process, the Open and Regionals, apart from a few who received special invites in some years. In the 2019 CrossFit Games, the qualification process was modified, and competitors had three separate ways to qualify: the Open, sanctioned events, and by invitation. In 2021, the Open once again reverted to its role as the first stage of competition that feeds the subsequent rounds, the Quarterfinals and Semifinals, in an expanded three-stage continent-based qualification system.

=== The Open ===
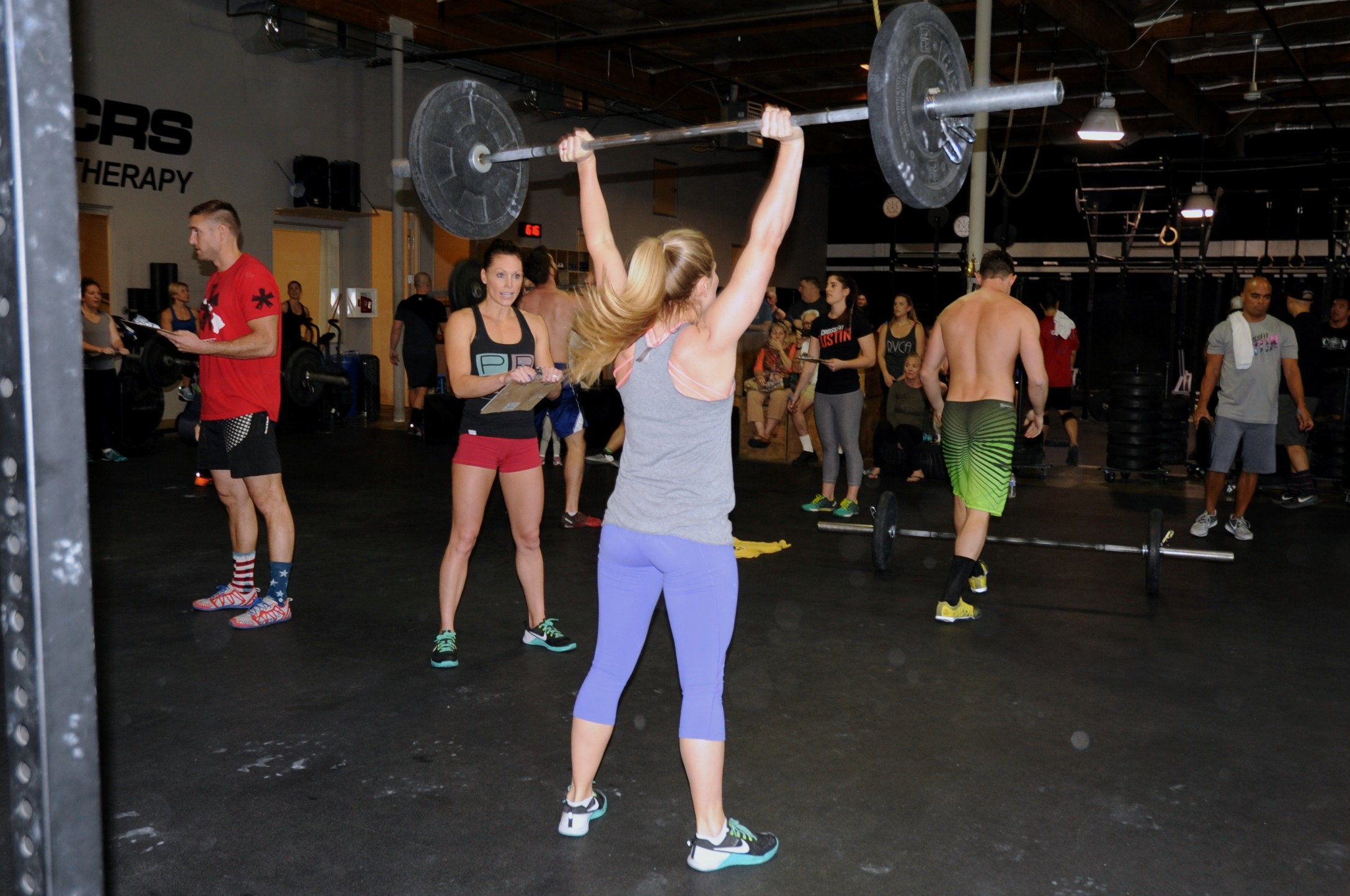
Athletes participating in the Open at a CrossFit box (gym) to qualify for the Regionals in the 2016 season

The Open was introduced in 2011 and participation is open to anyone over a certain age limit (14 since 2015) and at any skill level. The Open is held over a number of weeks, and a series of workouts are released weekly for competitors to complete. Athletes who wish to progress further in individual competitions need to perform the workouts as prescribed ("Rx'd"), but others who want to take part only in the Open can "scale" their workouts to be easier to suit their ability, or choose the foundation or equipment-free options introduced in 2021. Each week competitors perform the workouts and submit their scores online before a specified time supported by either videos of their workouts or validations by a CrossFit affiliate. In every event, the competitors are ranked according to their performance with points awarded directly corresponding to their rank (i.e. one point for first, two for second, etc.), and the winner is the one with the lowest cumulative points over the course of the Open.

From 2011 to 2019, the Open was usually held over five weeks in February and March with a new workout released each week, and athletes had to submit their score for each workout usually four days later. For the 2020 season, the Open moved forward to October 2019 as part of the overhaul for Games qualifications so that it took place before any of the sanctioned events. It has been moved back to February or March since the 2021 season.

In 2019, the top athlete from each country (the national champion) and the top 20 overall Open finishers qualified directly to the Games. This was also planned for 2020, but the COVID-19 pandemic travel restrictions led to only 20 men and 20 women from the Open being invited to an online competition as the first stage of the Games itself, and no national champion has been invited to the Games since.

In 2021, the Open reverted to be the starting point of the competition, but the number of weeks was reduced to three with only four workouts held. Three or four workouts have been held for the Open since 2022.

=== Quarterfinals ===
For the 2021 Games, the qualification system was again revamped, and a quarterfinal stage was added between the Open and the semifinals. Participants in the Open were separated on a continental basis, and only the top 10% on each continent can qualify for the quarterfinal. In 2024, this was raised to the top 25%. The quarterfinals start around a week and a half after the Open has finished, and are held online similar to the Open. The athletes are required to complete five workouts over 3 consecutive days after the workouts have been released. The quarterfinals were removed in 2025, and athletes moved directly from the Open to the semifinals, but are restored in 2026.

=== Regionals, Sanctionals, and Semifinals ===
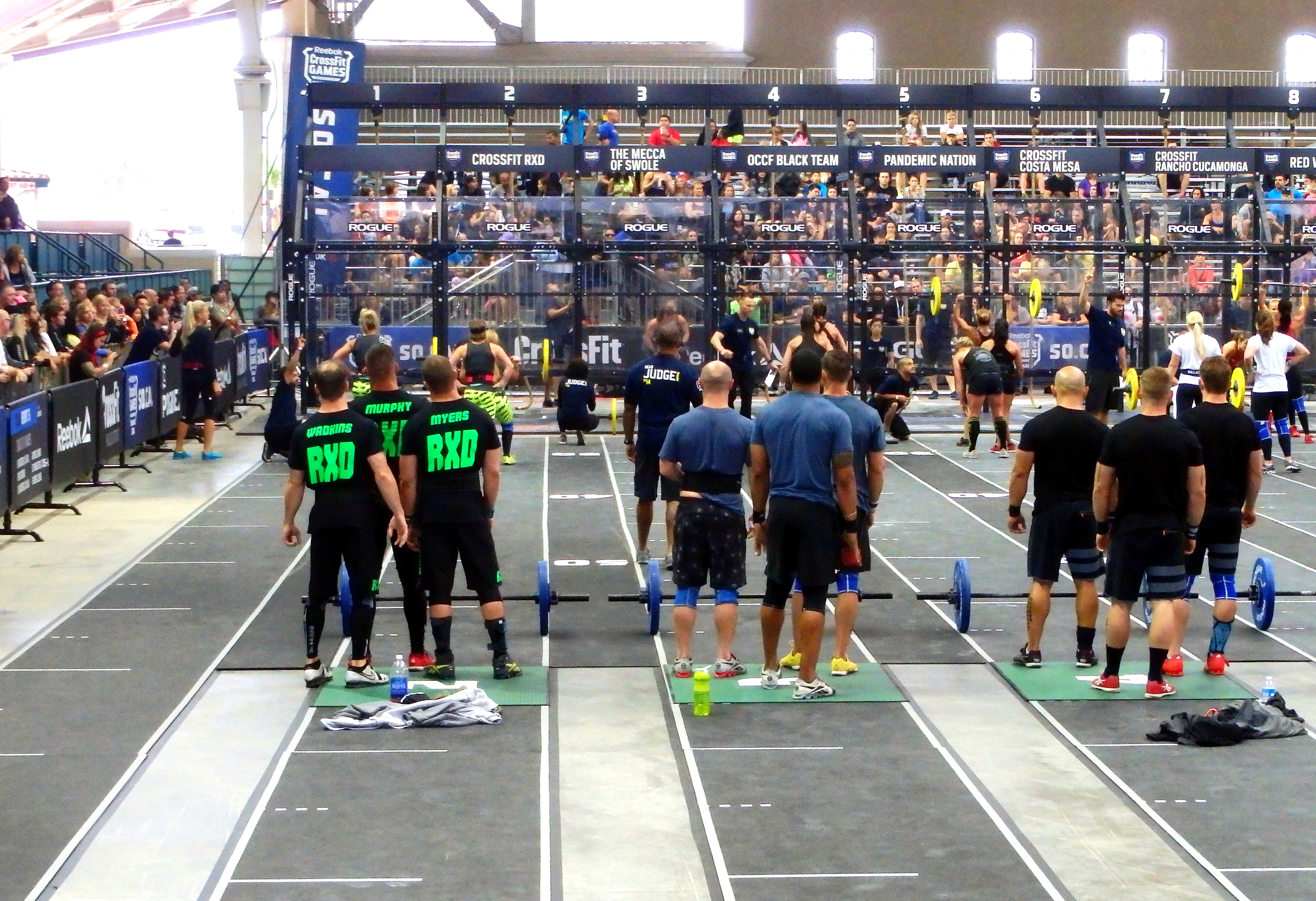
Team event at the SoCal Regional in 2014

Between 2009 and 2018, competitors qualified for the Games through participation at CrossFit Games regional events around the world. The top men and women from the Sectional in 2010, and the Open from 2011 to 2018, participated in the Regionals to qualify for the Games. There were 17 Regionals most years until 2015, when athletes from the 17 regions (later 18 regions) were funnelled into 8 or 9 Regional competitions. In 2011, the events in the Regionals were standardized.

For the 2019 Games, CrossFit, Inc. discontinued hosting the Regional qualifier and instead sanctioned independent fitness events as qualifiers separate from the Open. These events were trademarked as "Sanctionals" by CrossFit, LLC. Most of the sanctioned events were significant CrossFit competitions already widely participated in by CrossFit Games athletes around the world, such as Wodapalooza and Dubai CrossFit Championship, as well as the newly created Rogue Invitational. Each sanctioned event had its own rules for participation and separately programmed events. If an athlete or team won multiple sanctioned events, the runners-up from the later events would qualify to the Games. Twenty-eight sanctioned events were announced for the 2020 season, but many of them were cancelled due to the effects of the COVID-19 pandemic.

In 2021, the revamped semifinals were a mix of the Regionals and Sanctionals, with 10 semifinals scheduled in 6 continents. A last-chance online qualifier, last used in 2009, was reintroduced for semifinal athletes who narrowly missed a Games qualification. In 2022, CrossFit reintroduced identical workouts but only for two of the semifinal events. This is further extended in 2023 when all the workouts for the semifinals would be standardized, but the number of semifinals were reduced to seven, and the last chance qualifier eliminated. Each region is guaranteed a certain number of qualifiers to the Games, with extra spots allocated to each region using a strength of field calculation based a worldwide ranking system. In 2025, the quarterfinals were removed in another revamp, and the top 1% of participating athletes in the individual divisions move directly to take part in in-affiliate semifinals and nine in-person qualifying events.

=== Invitation ===
From 2009 to 2011, special invites were given to the top 5 men and women from the preceding Games as well as the individual champions of all previous games. The special invites for previous champions were removed in 2012, although CrossFit reserved the right to extend an invitation at any stage of the Games to any athlete, a right it exercised for two athletes in 2013. In 2019, the CrossFit Games had the option to invite up to four athletes who did not qualify for the Games in the Open or sanctioned events as an at-large bid.

== Competition events ==
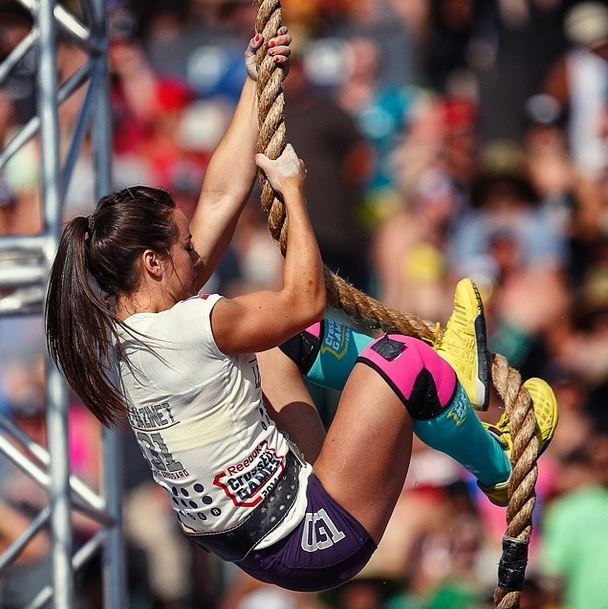
Camille Leblanc-Bazinet, 2014 Games Champion, doing a rope climb in the Thick 'n Quick event at the Games

Athletes at the Games compete in a series of workouts and activities over the course of a few days. The competition events at the CrossFit Games are not necessarily the same as workouts in a CrossFit gym and can include elements not normally seen in a CrossFit gym. The events are generally not announced in advance before the Games; the Games is set up as a test of fitness, and the founder of CrossFit Greg Glassman believes that CrossFit training should prepare athletes for "the unknown" and "the unknowable", so the fittest athletes should be able to handle any task given. Athletes are therefore kept in the dark as to exactly what they may face in the Games, and they may learn about the events days, hours, or minutes beforehand, sometimes not knowing the details of the events even after they have started on the event. These events test the athletes on what CrossFit defines as the ten fitness domains: "cardiovascular/respiratory endurance, stamina, strength, flexibility, power, speed, coordination, agility, balance, and accuracy", so that the fittest athlete can be determined using CrossFit's own criteria. The first Games only had 3 events; in the following years, the number of events gradually increased, and the Games now typically have 12–15 events held over a period of three to five days. Each event is scored individually; since 2011 the scoring system awards 100 points for the winner of every event, with lower-placing athletes receiving fewer points according to a points table. The athlete with the best combined score across all events is declared the champion and the "Fittest on Earth".

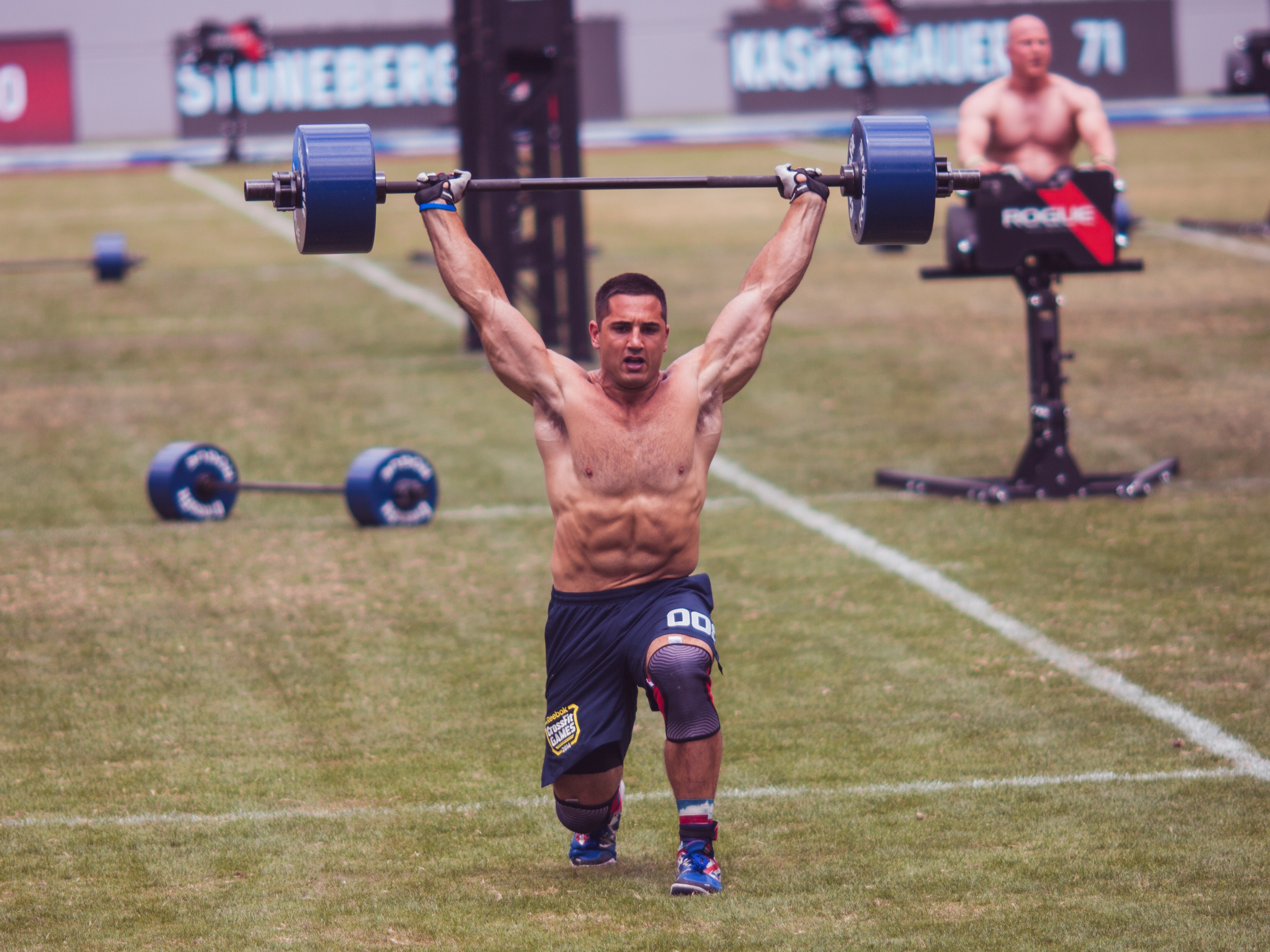
Jason Khalipa at the 2014 CrossFit Games, performing an Overhead Walking Lunge at the soccer stadium in Carson

The events are mostly an assortment of Crossfit workouts comprising exercises in monostructural/metabolic conditioning ("metcon"), weightlifting, and gymnastics, which are the three CrossFit modalities. The standard CrossFit workouts are usually a combination of movements of different modalities, such as handstand push-up, pull-up, muscle-up, burpee, lunge, box-jump, rope-climb, double under, running, back squat and dumbbell push press. Each workout may involve a number of rounds and repetitions (reps) of different movements, for example, a workout may have a rep scheme comprising three rounds of 21–15–9 repetitions of each movement. Workouts with "rounds for time" structure are won by competitors who can finish the rounds of workouts in the fastest time, while workouts in the "as many reps/rounds as possible" (AMRAP) format are won by those who complete the most reps or rounds within a set time. The workouts may be given specific names, for example, "Grace", "Fran", and "Amanda" from "The Girls" workouts, and "Murph" from the "Heroes" and tribute workouts. Events titled "Couplet" are composed of two different movements, while "Triplet" events have three. The "Chipper" events typically involve many different movements performed in sequence, while the "Ladder" events may involve increasing/decreasing number of reps or heavier/lighter weights in each succeeding round.

The Games often introduces some additional surprise elements that are not part of the typical CrossFit regimen to the events. These include obstacle courses, road cycling, ocean swimming, softball throwing, or ascending a pegboard. "Odd-objects" like yokes, sleds, and sandbags may also be introduced to the workouts; some of these the athletes would not have encountered before in a CrossFit gym, examples are the "Snail" (an object shaped like a bale of hay but partly filled with sand), the "Pig" (a heavy block encased in rubber), and the "Banger" (a metal block on a track hit with a hammer).

== Divisions ==
=== Individual ===
The marquee events at the CrossFit Games are the men's and women's individual competitions. The first place prize for each paid out $300,000 in 2020, with that amount set to increase to $310,000 in 2021.

=== Team ===
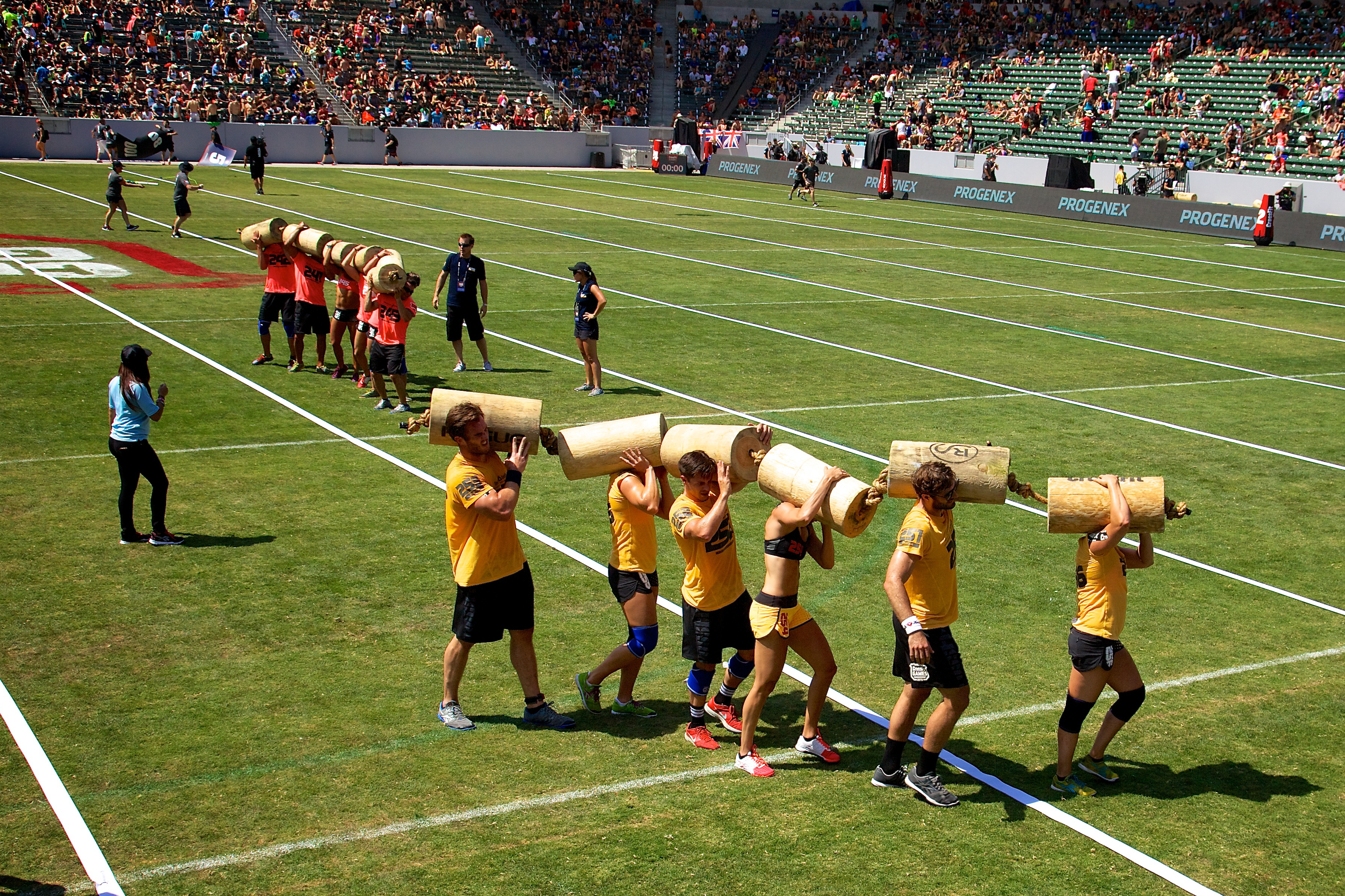
A team event at the 2013 CrossFit Games. Team members were holding a "Worm", an item of equipment used in team events.

Originally, teams were awarded the Affiliate Cup for having the best overall score from the individual athletes that had come from the same CrossFit-affiliated gym. In 2009, the Games began having a separate set of events for affiliate teams and consisted of four to six athletes from the same gym. The next season, the format was finalized to teams of three men and three women. In the 2018 games, each team was changed to four members, two men and two women. In 2019, CrossFit removed the stipulation that team members had to be from the same affiliate. Teams are subject to a similar qualification process as the individuals.

In 2021, the Games returned to affiliate-only teams and the Affiliate Cup.

=== Masters and Teens ===
Until 2024, the Games included age-based divisions for younger and older competitors. Masters divisions were introduced at the 2010 Games for those over 50. The number of Masters divisions increased in the following years; currently there are seven divisions each for women and men: 35–39, 40–44, 45–49, 50–54, 55–59, 60–64, and 65+. Divisions for teenagers were introduced in 2015: the age ranges are 14–15 and 16–17, for both boys and girls.

Rather than regional events, masters and teen athletes qualified for the games by a second online competition following the Open. The top 200 athletes in each division worldwide were invited to compete in this qualifier, of which the top 10 advance to the Games.

Prior to the introduction of these secondary online qualifiers, masters and teens competitors qualified for the Games directly from the Open.

For the 2024 season, although still considered part of the CrossFit Games, the finals of the Masters and Teens divisions were held separately from the Games; the Masters competed in the Legends Championship, while the Teens competed in the Pit Teen Throwdown.

=== Adaptive ===
The adaptive divisions were introduced in the 2021 CrossFit Open for competitors with physical impairment. There are 16 adaptive divisions (eight each for men and women) with no separation by age, but all competitors must be at least 14 years of age. Three male and three female divisions participated at the Games, while the rest are tested virtually in the semi-finals.

All stages of the adaptive divisions including the Open became separated from the CrossFit Games in 2024, and adaptive athletes competed in the WheelWOD Games.

== Controversies ==
Due to CrossFit's official partnership with Reebok, competitors at the 2015 Games were banned from wearing Nike footwear. Nike arranged for several trucks to be parked near the main entrance to the arena, which served as mobile billboards with the slogan "Don't ban our shoe, beat our shoe". The partnership also prohibits Nike from labeling its Metcon shoes as intended for CrossFit – the brand uses the term "high intensity training" instead.

CrossFit's decision to award winners of the 2016 Games with handguns resulted in widespread criticism from members and sponsors. Resulting protests forced the temporary closure of two CrossFit locations in New York City.

On June 6, 2020, CrossFit founder and CEO Greg Glassman was publicly criticized for his social media statements about the COVID-19 pandemic and the George Floyd protests resulting in many CrossFit-affiliated gyms around the world responded by ending their affiliation, Reebok announcing that they would end their corporate association after the 2020 Games, and several competitors boycotting the Games until he was removed from the company. On June 9, Glassman resigned as CEO and sold the company by the end of the month, leading to the boycotting athletes returning. Athletes from Taiwan are required to compete under the People's Republic of China flag, rather than the Republic of China flag. South China Morning Post reported that athletes have emailed CrossFit HQ, without any feedback.

=== Death of Lazar Đukić ===
At the 2024 CrossFit Games, a competitor from Serbia, Lazar Đukić, died from drowning in the first event that involved an open-water swim. Criticisms have been voiced on the decision to hold an outdoor run and swim event in the heat of Texas, where the water temperature may be too high to be safe, and on the availability of lifeguards and safety personnel at the event. Athletes and coaches also said that CrossFit had ignored safety concerns expressed by athletes over many years, citing examples of the 2015 Murph event where a number of athletes suffered from severe heat exhaustion, and an incident where multiple-champion Mat Fraser was said to have nearly drowned in a swim in 2017.

Some athletes also criticized the decision to continue with the Games. The leader of the sport team Dave Castro had falsely claimed before a vote by athletes to continue the competition that the Đukić family wanted the Games to continue as a tribute to Lazar. Luka Đukić, brother of Lazar and the only family member who was there as a competitor, later revealed he had not agreed to it and that Castro said to him the decision was "not up to you anyways". A number of athletes including both 2023 champions Laura Horvath and Jeffrey Adler chose to withdraw from the competition. Horvath accused CrossFit to be the one responsible for Đukić's death, she also thought their response to the death "inhumane", and that CrossFit was a corporation whose "basic instinct is survival and profit". The Professional Fitness Athletes' Association (PFAA), a group representing the interest of CrossFit athletes, called for transparency on the investigation into the death, the creation of an independent safety team, and the removal of Dave Castro as leader of the sport team.

CrossFit, however, refused to publish the third-party report on Đukić's death “based on privacy and legal considerations”. The rationale for the decision not to publish was described by CrossFit founder Greg Glassman (who is no longer involved in CrossFit) as "bullshit". CrossFit created its own safety advisory board, and kept Castro as leader of the sport team. It also established instead its own CrossFit Athlete Council as an alternative to PFAA. PFAA expressed its dissatisfaction with CrossFit's response and said that it would support any athlete should they wish to boycott the Games and explore alternative competitive routes. A number of prominent athletes, including Patrick Vellner, Laura Horvath, and Annie Thorisdottir, opted not to take part in the 2025 Games season, and affiliates have announced their de-affiliation from CrossFit or non-participation in the Open. Participation in the 2025 CrossFit Open fell over 30% from nearly 350,000 athletes in 2024 to 234,000. More than 1,400 CrossFit gyms also de-affiliated in 2024, 857 of them after the Crossfit Games.

== Broadcasting and media ==
In 2011, ESPN began to broadcast the CrossFit Games, with live coverage streamed through ESPN3, and some television coverage on ESPN2. As the event grew, ESPN expanded its television coverage; in 2014, the network entered into a multi-year deal to continue broadcasting the CrossFit Games, and coverage expanded to nine-and-a-half hours on ESPN and ESPN2 by 2015. In 2017, the event began a new broadcast arrangement with CBS Sports, with television coverage on CBS Sports Network, and a total of 40 hours of digital streaming coverage. In 2019, CrossFit experimented with an open-source broadcasting system that allowed various partners to broadcast the Games, but live broadcast resumed on CBS Sports in 2020. In 2023, ESPN returned as broadcaster for the Games with live coverage on ESPN, ESPN2 and ESPN+.

For many years CrossFit had its own media department that was responsible for creating and releasing media content related to the Games, including live streaming of the Games online through Facebook, YouTube and CrossFit websites, and content broadcast on ESPN and CBS. Events such as the Open workout announcements were broadcast live from 2013 to 2018, and featured two or more past CrossFit Games athletes competing head-to-head immediately following the workout description. During the 2018–19 restructuring, CrossFit dissolved its own media crew, relying instead on outside media outlets and production companies for coverage of the sport. For the next two years, Rogue Fitness broadcast the coverage of the Open workout announcement with competing athletes performing the workouts, and provided color commentary for the live stream of the Games. CrossFit resumed live streaming of its Open announcements in 2021. CrossFit's media department also produced a series of documentary films on the Games since 2015, and its former employees continued to produce them independently after the department was dissolved.

== Champions by year and category ==
Individual and Team champions

Year	Location	Individual Men	Individual Women	Team
2007	CrossFit Ranch (Aromas, California)	(Canada) James FitzGerald	(United States) Jolie Gentry	(United States) CrossFit Santa Cruz
2008	CrossFit Ranch (Aromas, California)	(United States) Jason Khalipa	(United States) Caity Matter	(United States) CrossFit Oakland
2009	CrossFit Ranch (Aromas, California)	(Finland) Mikko Salo	(United States) Tanya Wagner	(United States) Northwest CrossFit
2010	Home Depot Center (Carson, California)	(United States) Graham Holmberg	(United States) Kristan Clever	(United States) CrossFit Fort Vancouver
2011	Home Depot Center (Carson, California)	(United States) Rich Froning Jr.	(Iceland) Anníe Mist Þórisdóttir	(United States) CrossFit New England
2012	Home Depot Center (Carson, California)	(United States) Rich Froning Jr.	(Iceland) Anníe Mist Þórisdóttir	(United States) Hack's Pack UTE
2013	Home Depot Center (Carson, California)	(United States) Rich Froning Jr.	(United Kingdom) Samantha Briggs	(United States) Hack's Pack UTE
2014	Home Depot Center (Carson, California)	(United States) Rich Froning Jr.	(Canada) Camille Leblanc-Bazinet	(United States) CrossFit Invictus
2015	Home Depot Center (Carson, California)	(United States) Ben Smith	(Iceland) Katrín Tanja Davíðsdóttir	(United States) CrossFit Mayhem Freedom
2016	Home Depot Center (Carson, California)	(United States) Mathew Fraser	(Iceland) Katrín Tanja Davíðsdóttir	(United States) CrossFit Mayhem Freedom
2017	Alliant Energy Center (Madison, Wisconsin)	(United States) Mathew Fraser	(Australia) Tia-Clair Toomey	(United States) Wasatch CrossFit
2018	Alliant Energy Center (Madison, Wisconsin)	(United States) Mathew Fraser	(Australia) Tia-Clair Toomey	(United States) CrossFit Mayhem Freedom
2019	Alliant Energy Center (Madison, Wisconsin)	(United States) Mathew Fraser	(Australia) Tia-Clair Toomey	(United States) CrossFit Mayhem Freedom
2020	CrossFit Ranch (Aromas, California)	(United States) Mathew Fraser	(Australia) Tia-Clair Toomey	No team events held
2021	Alliant Energy Center (Madison, Wisconsin)	(United States) Justin Medeiros	(Australia) Tia-Clair Toomey	(United States) CrossFit Mayhem
2022	Alliant Energy Center (Madison, Wisconsin)	(United States) Justin Medeiros	(Australia) Tia-Clair Toomey	(United States) CrossFit Mayhem Freedom
2023	Alliant Energy Center (Madison, Wisconsin)	(Canada) Jeff Adler	(Hungary) Laura Horvath	(United States) CrossFit Invictus
2024	Dickies Arena (Fort Worth, Texas)	(United States) James Sprague	(Australia) Tia-Clair Toomey	(Australia) Raw Iron CrossFit Mayhem Thunder
2025	MVP Arena (Albany, New York)	(United States) Jayson Hopper	(Australia) Tia-Clair Toomey	(Norway) CrossFit Oslo Kriger
2026	SAP Center (San Jose, California)	(United States) James Sprague	(United Kingdom) Aimee Cringle	(United States) CrossFit Whip

Masters men's champions

Year	35–39	40–44	45–49	50–54	55–59	60–64	65+
2010	—			Brian Curley			
2011	—		Scott DeTore	Gord MacKinnon	Steve Anderson	Greg Walker	
2012	—		Gene LaMonica	Gord MacKinnon	Tim Anderson	Scott Olson	
2013	—	Michael Moseley	Ron Ortiz	Craig Howard	Hilmar Hardarson	Scott Olson	
2014	—	Shawn Ramirez	Jerry Hill	Will Powell	Steve Hamming	Scott Olson	
2015	—	Shawn Ramirez	Matthew Swift	Joe Ames	Will Powell	Steve Pollini	
2016	—	Shawn Ramirez	Ron Mathews	Ron Ortiz	Will Powell	David Hippensteel	
2017	Kyle Kasperbauer	Shawn Ramirez	Robert Davis	Kevin Koester	Shannon Aiken	David Hippensteel	
2018	Kyle Kasperbauer	Neal Maddox	Robert Davis	Cliff Musgrave	Brig Edwards	David Hippensteel	
2019	Nick Urankar	Jason Grubb	Joel Hughes	Kevin Koester	Joe Ames	Gord MacKinnon (Note: Paul Perna originally finished first but was later disqualified for testing positive for banned performance-enhancing substances.)	
2020	No Masters events due to COVID-19 pandemic						
2021	Kyle Kasperbauer	Maxime Guyon	Jason Grubb	Bernard Luzi	Vincent Diephuis	Will Powell	Ken Ogden
2022	Bryan Wong	Rudolph Berger	Jason Grubb	Sean Patrick	Mike Egan	Shannon Aiken	Cal Cherrington
2023	Sam Dancer	Rudolph Berger	Jason Grubb	Artur Komorowski	Kevin Koester	Stuart Swanson	Daniel Miller
2024	Will Moorad	Jonathan Edel	Jason Grubb	Justin LaSala	John Kim	Joe Ames	John George

Masters women's champions

Year	35–39	40–44	45–49	50–54	55–59	60–64	65+
2010	—			Laurie Carver			
2011	—		Susan Habbe	Mary Beth Litsheim	Shelley Noyce	Betsy Finley	
2012	—		Lisa Mikkelsen	Susan Habbe	Marnel King	Mary Schwing	
2013	—	Amanda Allen	Lisa Mikkelsen	Colleen Fahey	Gabriele Schlicht	Sharon Lapkoff	
2014	—	Amanda Allen	Kim Holway	Mary Beth Litsheim	Susan Clarke	Karen Wattier	
2015	—	Janet Black	Kylie Massi	Cindy Kelley	Susan Clarke	Rosalie Glenn	
2016	—	Helen Harding	Cheryl Brost	Shellie Edington	Mary Beth Prodromides (née Litsheim)	Shaun Havard	
2017	Stephanie Roy	Helen Harding	Cheryl Brost	Marion Valkenburg (Note: Josée Sarda originally finished first but was later disqualified for testing positive for banned performance-enhancing substances.)	Susan Clarke	Patty Failla	
2018	Anna Tobias	Stephanie Roy	Amanda Allen	Eva Thornton	Mary Beth Prodromides	Shaun Havard	
2019	Anna Tobias	Joey Kimdon	Janet Black	Jana Slyder	Laurie Meschishnick	Susan Clarke	
2020	No Masters events due to COVID-19 pandemic						
2021	Whitney Gelin	Kelly Friel	Annie Sakamoto	Tia Vesser	Laurie Meschishnick	Susan Clarke	Patty Bauer
2022	Emilia Leppänen	Kelly Friel	Ali Crawford	Kim Purdy	Shanna Bunce	Mary Beth Prodromides	Julie Holt
2023	Laurie Clément	Samantha Briggs	Kelly Friel	Cheryl Brost	Leka Fineman	Susan Clarke	Julie Holt
2024	Andrea Nisler	Carly Newlands	Deanna Posey	Janet Black	Joyanne Cooper	Laurie Meschishnick	Patricia McGill

Teens champions

Year	14–15 Boys	14–15 Girls	16–17 Boys	16–17 Girls
2015	Angelo Dicicco	Sydney Sullivan	Nicholas Paladino	Isabella Vallejo
2016	Vincent Ramirez	Kaela Stephano	Nicholas Paladino	Allison Weiss
2017	Dallin Pepper	Chloe Smith	Angelo Dicicco	Kaela Stephano
2018	Tudor Magda	Olivia Sulek	Dallin Pepper	Haley Adams
2019	David Bradley	Emma Cary	Dallin Pepper	Chloe Smith
2020	No Teens events due to COVID-19 pandemic			
2021	Ty Jenkins	Olivia Kerstetter	Nate Ackermann	Emma Lawson
2022	RJ Mestre	Lucy McGonigle	Ty Jenkins	Olivia Kerstetter
2023	Jeremie Jourdan	María Granizo	Ty Jenkins	Lucy McGonigle
2024	Pablo Tronchon	Keira McManus	RJ Mestre	Reese Littlewood

Adaptive divisions champions

Year	Men Upper Extremity	Women Upper Extremity	Men Lower Extremity	Women Lower Extremity	Men Neuromuscular	Women Neuromuscular
2021	Casey Acree	Sabrina Daniela Lopez	Ole Kristian Antonsen	Valerie Cohen	Brett Horchar	Shannon Ogar
2022	Casey Acree	Camille Vigneault	Charles Pienaar	Valerie Cohen	Brett Horchar	Morgan Johnson
2023	Casey Acree	Christina Mazzullo	Rogan Dean	Valerie Cohen	Chris Rhyme	Noelle Henderson

== See also ==
- Hyrox
- Ironman Triathlon
- National Pro Grid League
- Fitness and figure competition
