= CrossFit =

Branded fitness regimen

CrossFit, LLC
- Industry: Fitness, sports
- Founded: 2000; 26 years ago
- Founder: Greg Glassman; Lauren Jenai
- Headquarters: Santa Cruz, California, U.S.
- Area served: Worldwide
- Website: crossfit.com

CrossFit is a branded fitness regimen that involves constantly varied functional movements performed at high intensity. The method was developed by Greg Glassman, who founded CrossFit with Lauren Jenai in 2000, with CrossFit as its registered trademark. The company forms what has been described as the biggest fitness chain in the world, with around 10,000 affiliated gyms in over 150 countries as of 2025, about 40% of which are located in the United States.

CrossFit is promoted as both a physical exercise philosophy and a competitive fitness sport, incorporating elements from high-intensity interval training (HIIT), Olympic weightlifting, plyometrics, powerlifting, gymnastics, kettlebell lifting, calisthenics, strongman, and other exercises. CrossFit presents its training program as one that can best prepare its trainees for any physical contingency, preparing them for what may be "unknown" and "unknowable". It is practiced by members in CrossFit-affiliated gyms, and by individuals who complete daily workouts (otherwise known as "WODs" or "Workouts of the Day").

Studies indicate that CrossFit can have positive effects on a number of physical fitness parameters and body composition, as well as on the mental state and social life of its participants. CrossFit has been criticized for causing more injuries than other sporting activities such as weightlifting, although a review article in the Journal of Sports Rehabilitation found that "the risk of injury from participation in CrossFit is comparable to or lower than some common forms of exercise or strength training". Its health benefits and injury rates are determined to be similar to other exercise programs. There are also concerns that its methodology may cause exertional rhabdomyolysis, a possible life-threatening condition also found in other sports, resulting from a breakdown of muscle from extreme exertion.

== History ==
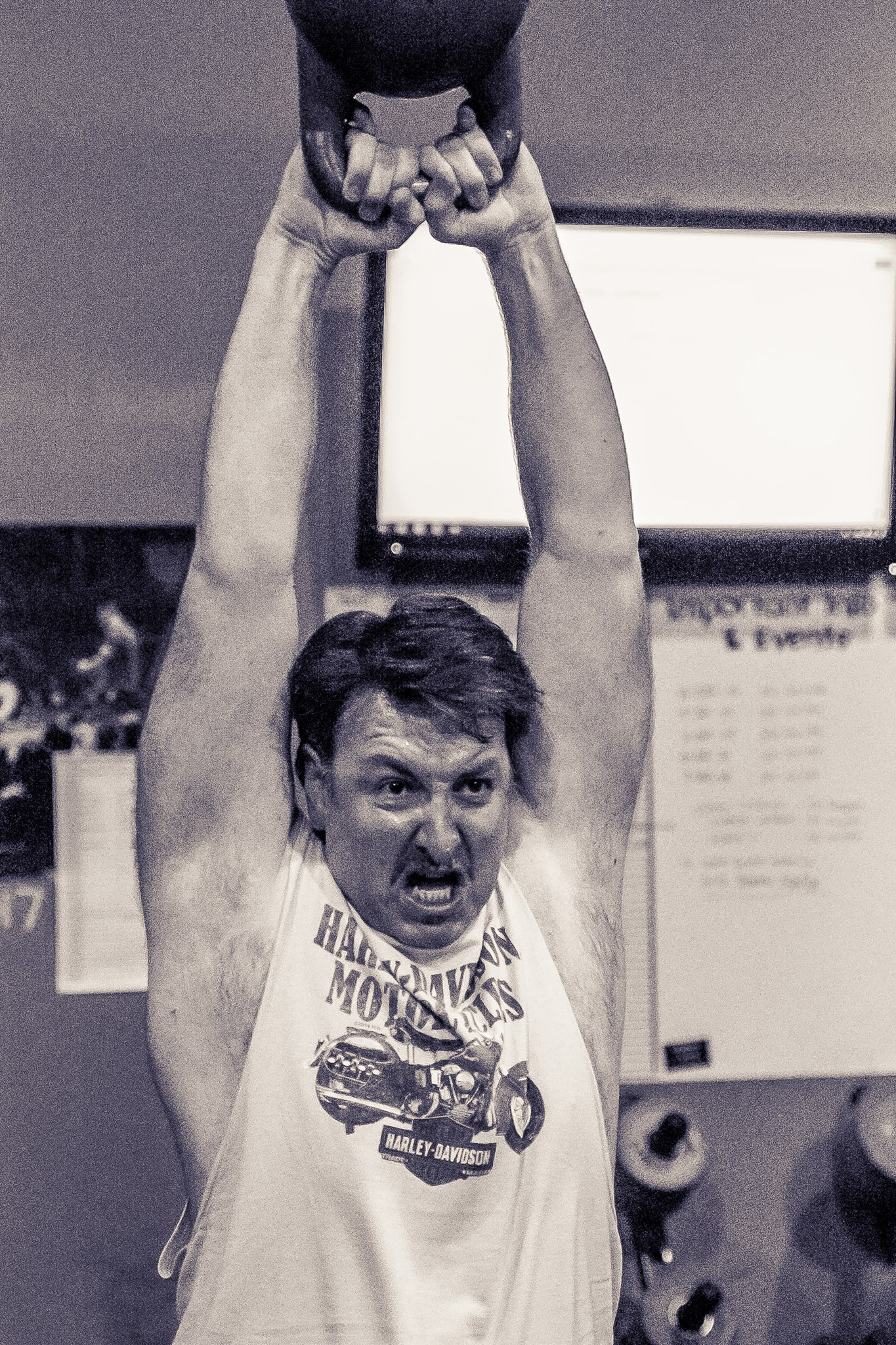
Practicing American kettlebell swing

CrossFit, meaning cross-discipline fitness, was first conceived as a company in 1996 as Cross-Fit. Greg Glassman, a former gymnast, created his first CrossFit-style workout when he was 16 by combining elements of gymnastics with weightlifting. The workout he created, called Fran, added thrusters (a combination of front squat and push press) to pull-ups. Greg Glassman and Lauren Jenai incorporated CrossFit, Inc. in 2000. They opened a gym in Santa Cruz, California, in 2001, and posted their workouts on the Internet for their clients. These workouts were then quickly adopted by individuals in the police, military, and firefighting services. Those who used Glassman's online postings expressed an interest in officially incorporating his workouts into their training regimen, and the first affiliated gym (known as 'box'), CrossFit North in Seattle, Washington, was formed in 2002. Glassman began to develop a curriculum to train and certify coaches and gym owners using his methodology. Coaches associated with CrossFit include Louie Simmons, John Welbourn, and Bob Harper.

The number of CrossFit-affiliated gyms grew quickly: there were 13 gyms in 2005, 8,000 in 2013, and more than 13,000 in 2016. By 2018, there were around 15,500 CrossFit gyms in 162 countries. Its membership worldwide has been estimated to between two and five million. However, the COVID-19 pandemic forced the closure of around 20% of its gyms (around 25% in the US), and disaffiliations due to the Glassman controversy in 2020 further reduced the number of paid affiliations to 9,400 by early 2021. The number recovered to around 12,500 including non-paying affiliates (10,800 paying) by early 2022, with strong growth observed in Europe. The number of paying affiliates was around 11,400 by 2024, however, an increase in affiliate fees in 2024 and the controversy surrounding the death of an athlete at the 2024 Games resulted in a drop in the number of affiliates to around 9,900 by early 2025.

Glassman gained complete control of the company in 2012 after divorcing Jenai. Jenai had tried to sell her 50% share in the company to an investment firm after the divorce settlement, which Glassman blocked and bought her share after raising a $16 million loan from Summit Partners.

On June 24, 2020, following the outcry after Glassman's comments regarding the murder of George Floyd it was announced that he was selling the company to Eric Roza, former CEO of Datalogix, in partnership with investment firm Berkshire Partners. Roza assumed the role of CEO after the sale concluded in July. In late November, CrossFit announced a building lease for its Boulder headquarters. At the end of 2020, CrossFit became an LLC. Roza stood down as CEO of CrossFit in February 2022, and Don Faul took over in August 2022. Don Faul stepped down from his role on March 6, 2026.

== Overview ==
=== Methodology ===
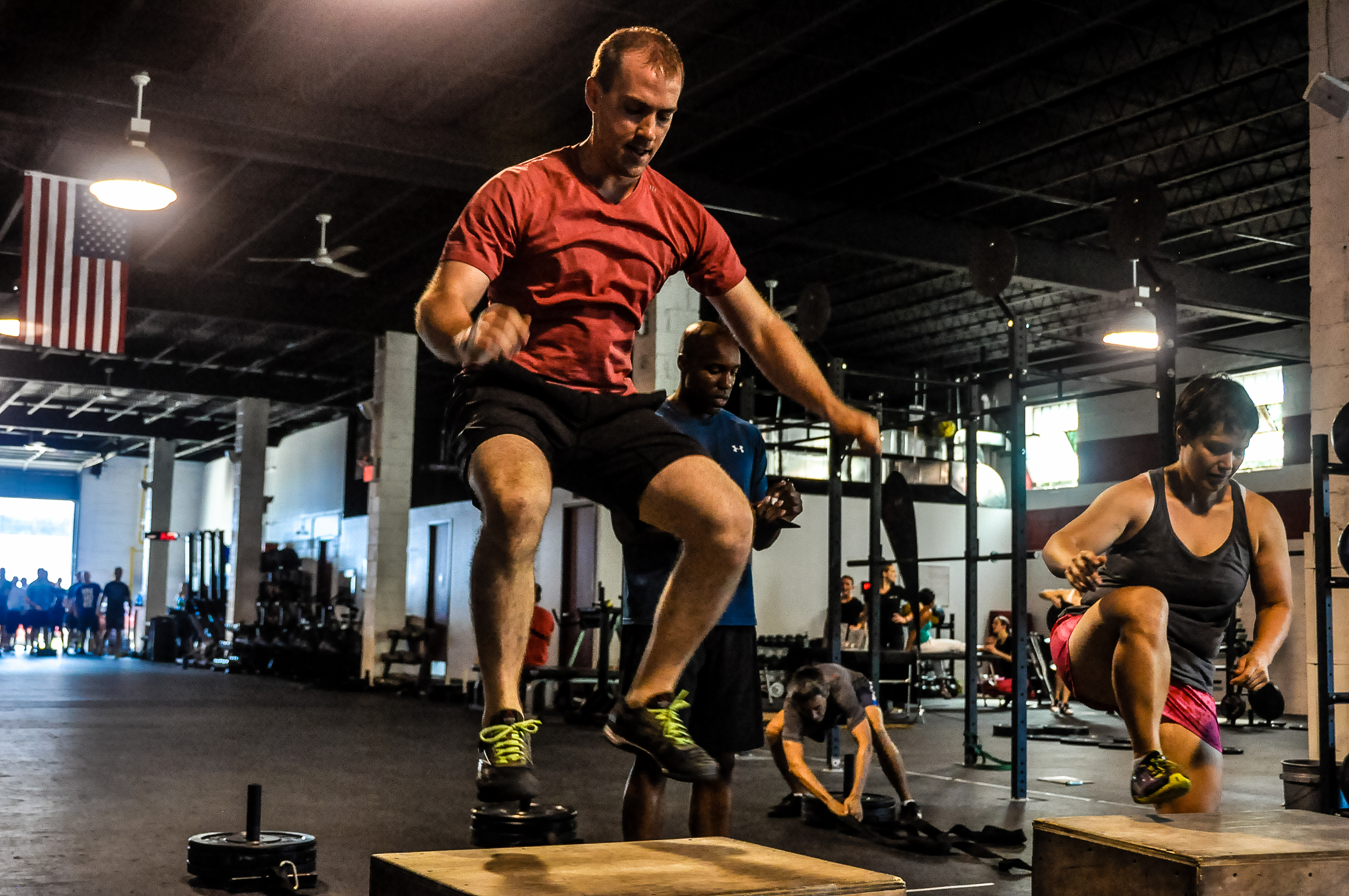
CrossFitters performing box jump (left) and step-up (right). Step-up can be used as a scaling option for box jump

CrossFit is a strength, conditioning, and overall fitness program consisting mainly of a mix of aerobic (cardio) exercises, calisthenics (bodyweight exercises), and weightlifting. CrossFit describes its strength and conditioning program as "constantly varied functional movements executed at high intensity across broad time and modal domains", and it aims to improve the overall fitness of its participants by increasing their work capacity in these domains. CrossFit believes there are ten components or domains in physical fitness: cardiovascular/respiratory endurance, stamina, strength, flexibility, power, speed, coordination, agility, balance, accuracy.

CrossFit proposes nutrition to be the foundation of fitness, and on this foundation, metabolic conditioning can improve cardiovascular efficiency, gymnastics can build an athlete's spatial awareness and body control, while weightlifting and throwing allow for better control of external objects, so that the general physical preparedness required for any sport can be achieved. CrossFit focuses on functional movements, movements it considers natural and essential with real-life application. It advocates training with high intensity, believing that such training can achieve the desired result quicker, that increasing weights when lifting can help build strength, while increasing the repetitions of movements can improve stamina and endurance. It also believes that physical training should be varied regularly to achieve a general level of fitness, rather than only excelling in any single activity.

=== WODs ===
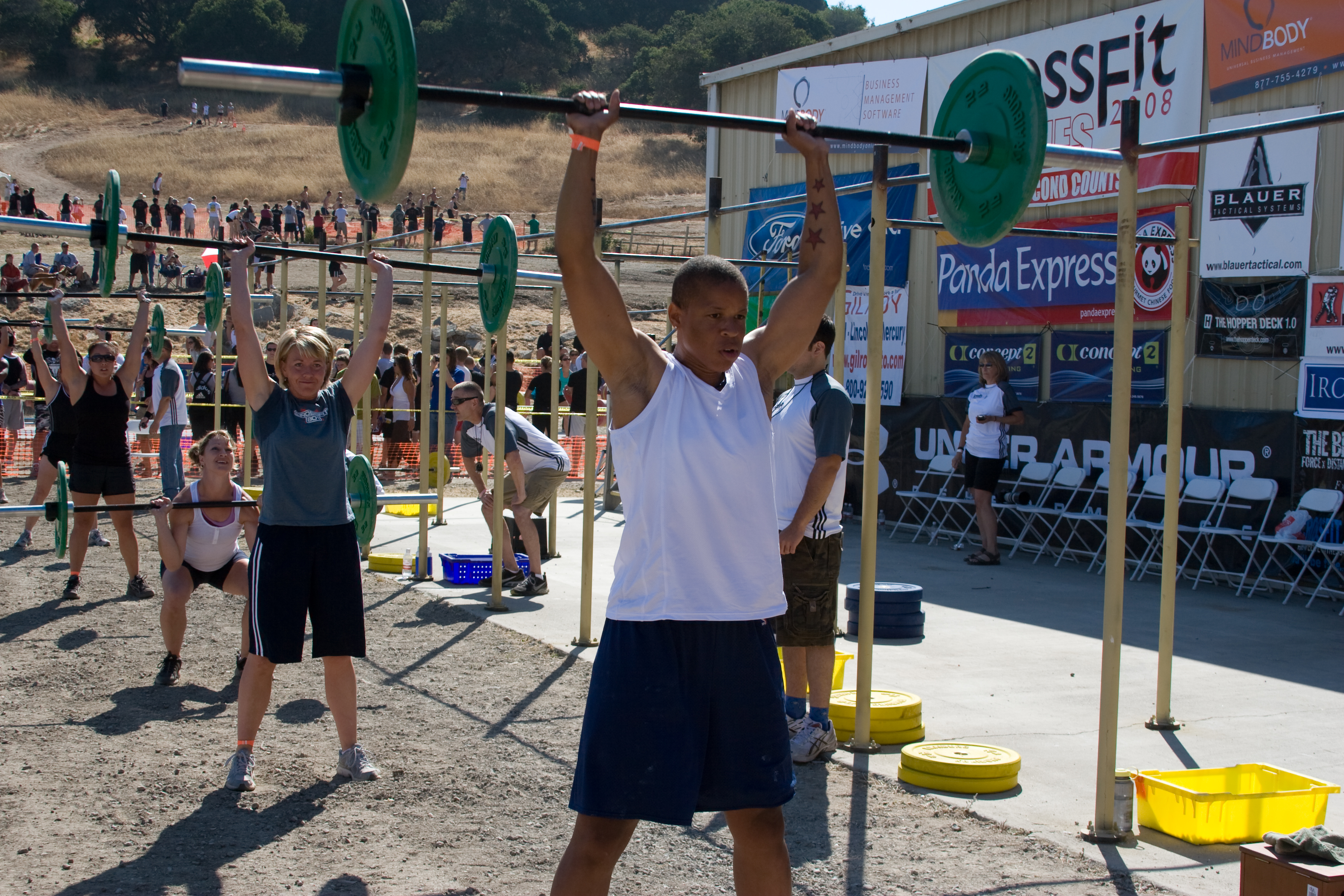
Thruster, consisting of a front squat and an overhead press, is a common barbell movement in CrossFit.

The workout in CrossFit is referred to as a WOD, short for "Workout of the Day". Every WOD may be a mix of movements from one or more of the three different modalities: monostructural/metabolic conditioning ("metcon"), weightlifting, and gymnastics. Examples of movements from gymnastics include: pull-up, muscle-up, box-jump, lunge, handstand push-up, and rope-climb; examples from cardio/metcon include: running, cycling, double under, and rowing; and examples from weightlifting include deadlifts, back squat, snatch, clean and jerk, thrusters, dumbbell push press, wall ball, and kettlebell swing. A WOD can have a number of movements, and each movement is typically performed with a certain number of repetitions; for example, a WOD called Fran has two movements: thrusters and pull-ups, and each of these are performed 21 times, followed by further rounds of 15 and 9 repetitions. The duration and content of the WOD are not fixed and vary daily. WODs are often given specific names and some are considered benchmark WODs, for example, "Fran", "Grace", and "Helen" from "The Girls" workouts, A WOD called "Murph" from the "Heroes" workouts has become more widely known and is performed outside of CrossFit.

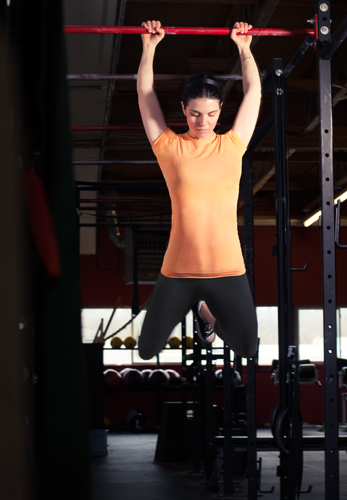
A kipping pull-up

If the WOD is performed as written, it is referred to as "Rx'd" (for "as prescribed"). However, the intensity, volume, or movements of the WOD can be adjusted to suit the fitness level, experience, ability, physical limitations or time constraints of the participants, and this is called "scaling". In scaling, the number of repetitions, length of time, and weights may be reduced, and movements may be modified to be easier to perform while maintaining the same intended stimulus using similar movement patterns. Scaling allows people of all ages and experience to participate in the workout.

Some movements are specific to CrossFit; for example, in order to perform certain movements such as pull-up faster, "kipping" that relies on the momentum of the kip to move faster may be employed, although its use for these purposes is considered controversial to non-practitioners of CrossFit.

=== Gym classes ===
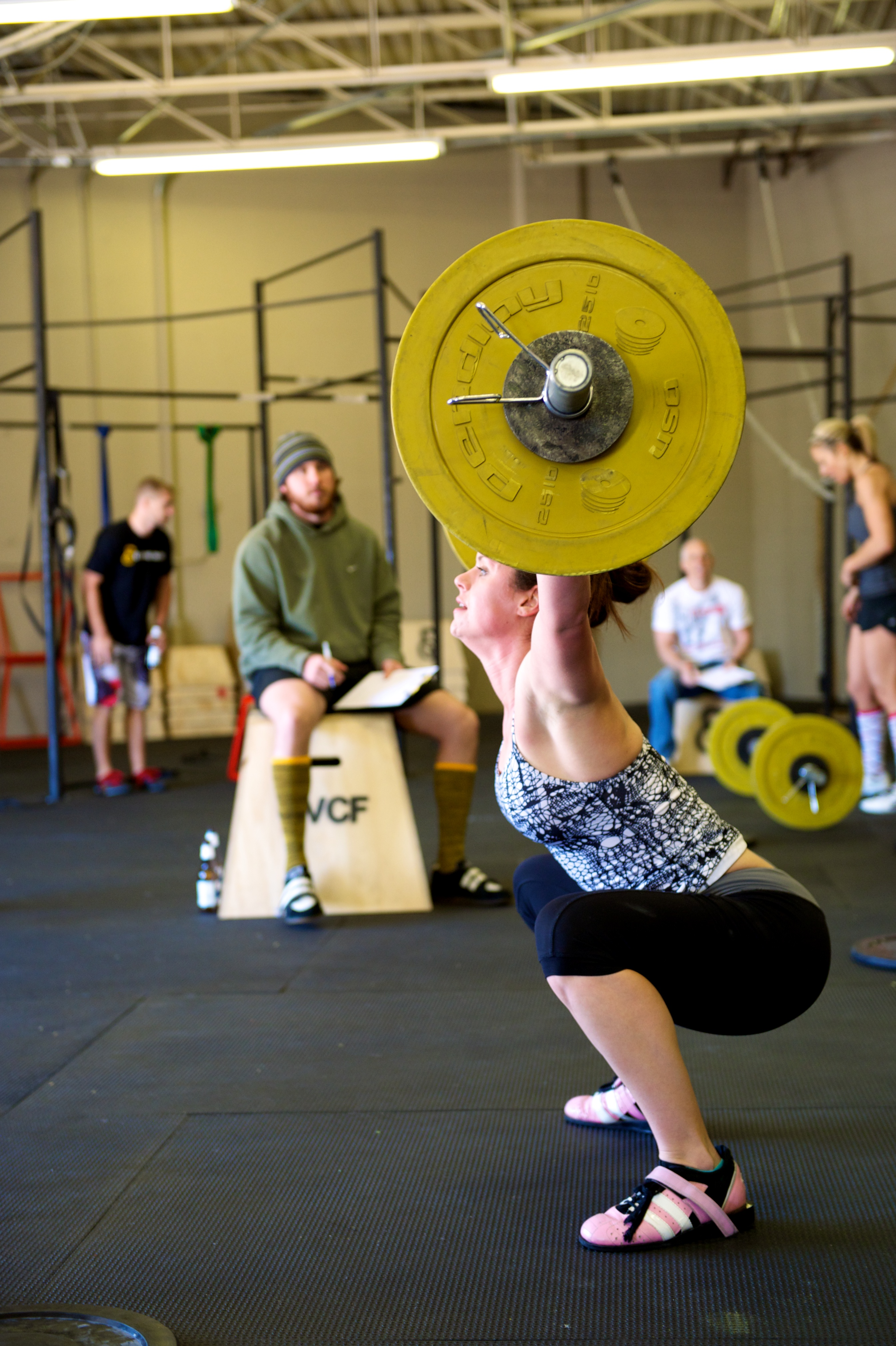
Snatch in a CrossFit box

CrossFit-affiliated gyms, or "boxes", have considerable freedom in how their classes are organized; therefore, there can be significant differences in their classes. In general, classes last an hour and typically include a warm-up, a 10–30-minute WOD, and a cool-down/stretching/recovery session. Some gyms also have a strength-focused movement prior to the WOD or a skill development segment. CrossFit, however, encourages most athletes to prioritize intensity over supplemental strength training or additional programming. Performance on each WOD may be scored and/or ranked to encourage competition and to track individual progress. Some affiliates offer additional classes, such as Olympic weightlifting, that are not centered on a WOD. Many offer on-ramp or introductory courses for beginners to teach the fundamental movements of CrossFit. Some affiliates may also offer diet advice to their members following CrossFit's nutrition recommendations, adopting paleo, keto and/or zone diets, or counting macros.

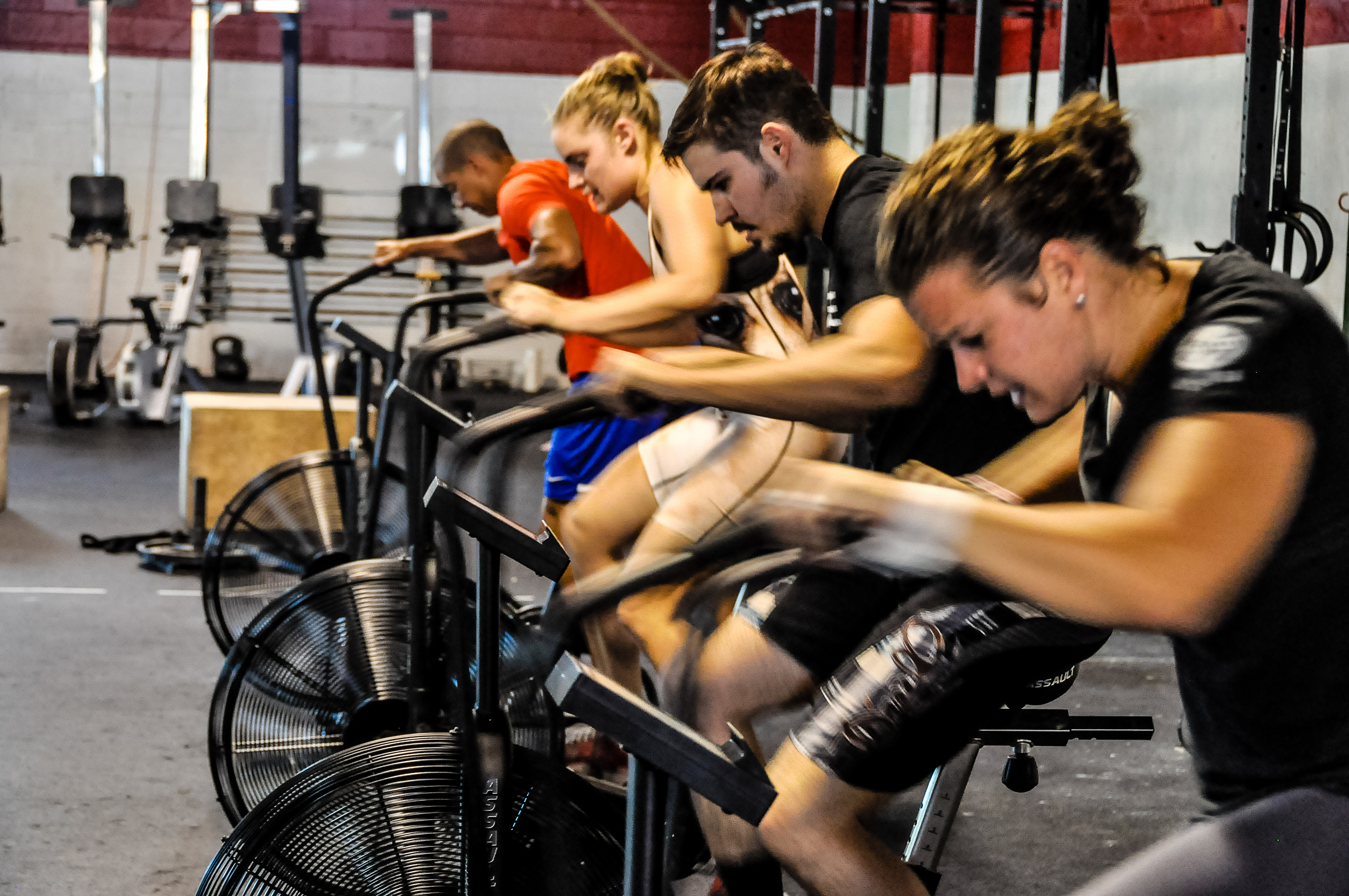
Cycling on Assault bikes as cardio exercises in CrossFit

CrossFit gyms use equipment from multiple disciplines, including barbells, dumbbells, gymnastics rings, rope climbs, pull-up bars, jump ropes, kettlebells, medicine balls, plyo boxes, resistance bands, rowing machines, exercise bikes, SkiErg, and various mats. CrossFit is focused on "constantly varied high-intensity functional movement", drawing on categories and exercises such as calisthenics, Olympic-style weightlifting, powerlifting, strongman-type events, plyometrics, bodyweight exercises, indoor rowing, aerobic exercise, running, and swimming.

CrossFit has released a daily WOD for use by the general public since 2001. It also offers CrossFit Affiliate Programming (CAP) that gives detailed class plans such as warm-up, workout, scaling options, and other resources to its affiliated gyms since 2021. Individuals and affiliated gyms may also create their own programming based on CrossFit's general methodology, or programming from independent companies.

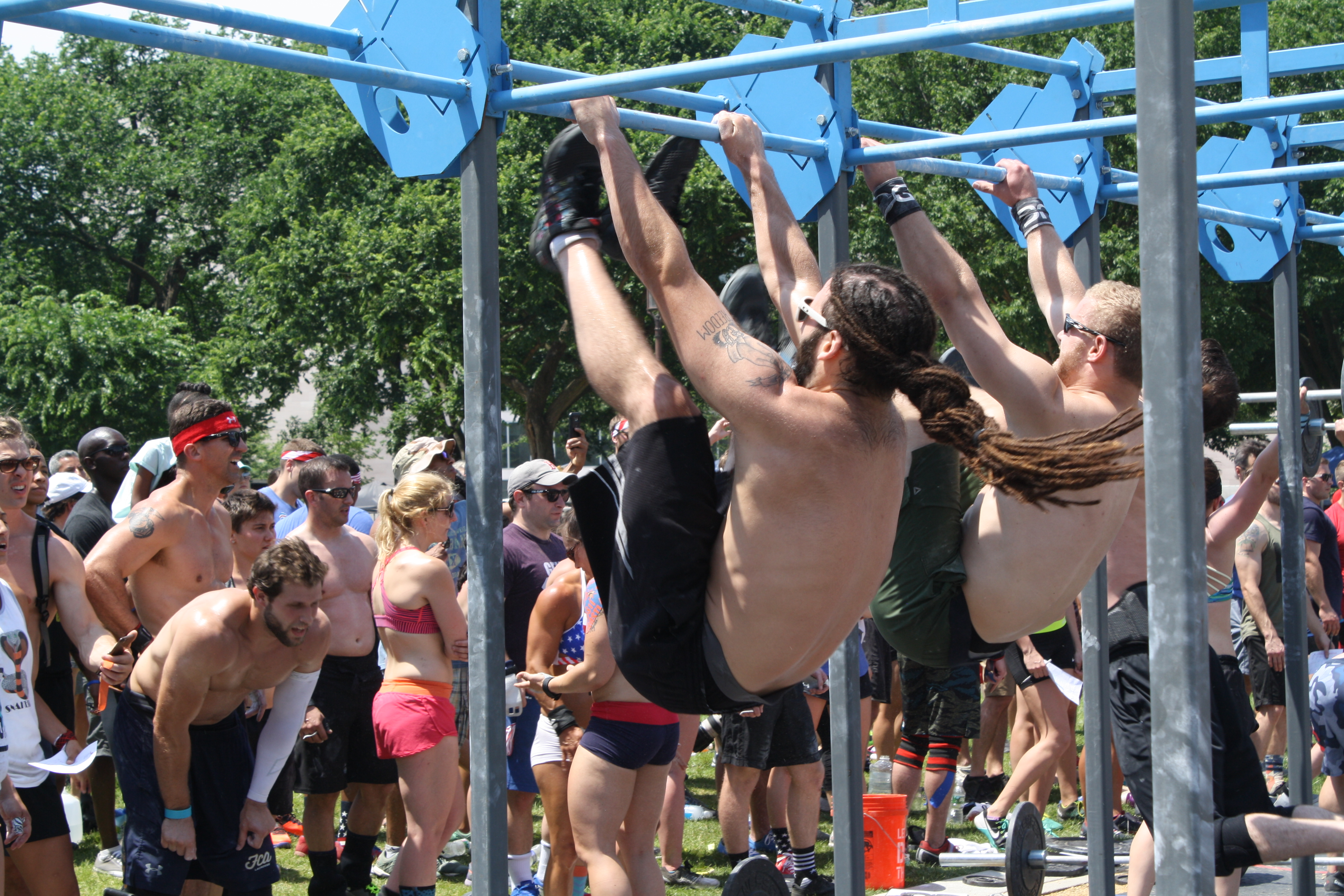
Toes-to-bar, a gymnastics movement used in CrossFit

A 2014 statistical analysis showed that 50% of CrossFit participants were male and 50% were female.

=== Usage and impact ===
CrossFit methodology is used by thousands of private affiliated gyms, fire departments, law-enforcement agencies, and military organizations, including the Royal Danish Life Guards, as well as by some U.S. and Canadian high school physical education teachers, high school and college sports teams, and the Miami Marlins.

The rise of CrossFit has been attributed to the popularity of HIIT as a form of exercise, which ranked first in a worldwide survey of fitness trends by the American College of Sports Medicine (ACSM) in 2013. It was also the top trend in 2018 and stayed in the top 5 until 2021. Its popularity also led to the emergence of a number of gym franchises based on HIIT in the 2010s, such as F45 and Orangetheory. The use of weightlifting in the sport has also created a spike in interest in Olympic weightlifting in the United States. A number of American weightlifters, such as Mattie Rogers, Hampton Morris, and Olivia Reeves, became involved in weightlifting through CrossFit.

== Business model ==
There are three main revenue streams for CrossFit: affiliation, education, and sport. CrossFit licenses the CrossFit name to affiliated gyms for an annual fee. The affiliation fee was set at US$3,000 a year from 2011, and stayed unchanged until 2024 when it was raised to $4,500. However, the affiliation fee is waived for those in law enforcement, military service, prisons, schools and universities. The affiliation model is distinct from a franchise, and CrossFit gyms have complete freedom in their operation once the requirements for affiliation have been met. At its peak in 2018, there were over 15,000 CrossFit affiliates, including non-paying ones, in 162 countries. There are around 10,000 paying affiliates as of 2025.

CrossFit also provides training courses to certify trainers and gym owners. The standard two-day "Level 1 Certificate Course" (L1) is a requirement for CrossFit gym owners. The requirement was raised to Level 2 (L2) for 2024. Level 3 Trainer examination and Level 4 Coach assessment are also available. CrossFit also offers the CrossFit Kids Course and many online course offerings. During the COVID-19 pandemic, CrossFit also began offering an Online Level 1 Course. There were more than 35,000 accredited CrossFit trainers in 2013. Certification charges for coaches training account for more than a third of CrossFit's revenue.

As part of its services to affiliates, CrossFit has offered CrossFit Affiliate Programming (CAP) to gyms for free since 2023. Affiliates, however, may develop their own programming, pricing, and instructional methods. Many athletes and trainers see themselves as part of a contrarian, insurgent movement that questions conventional fitness wisdom. Other specialized adaptations include programs for pregnant women, seniors, and military special operations candidates. CrossFit makes use of a virtual community internet model. Many independent companies have been set up to provide online services including training programs for CrossFit communities, such as Mayhem, Linchpin, HWPO, PRVN, CompTrain and GoWOD, while other companies supply equipment and apparel such as Rogue Fitness and NoBull.

CrossFit also organizes the CrossFit Games and its qualifying rounds, such as the Open. Participants in the Open pay a registration fee to compete. The total generated from all the revenue streams for CrossFit has been estimated to be around $100 million a year.

== CrossFit Games ==
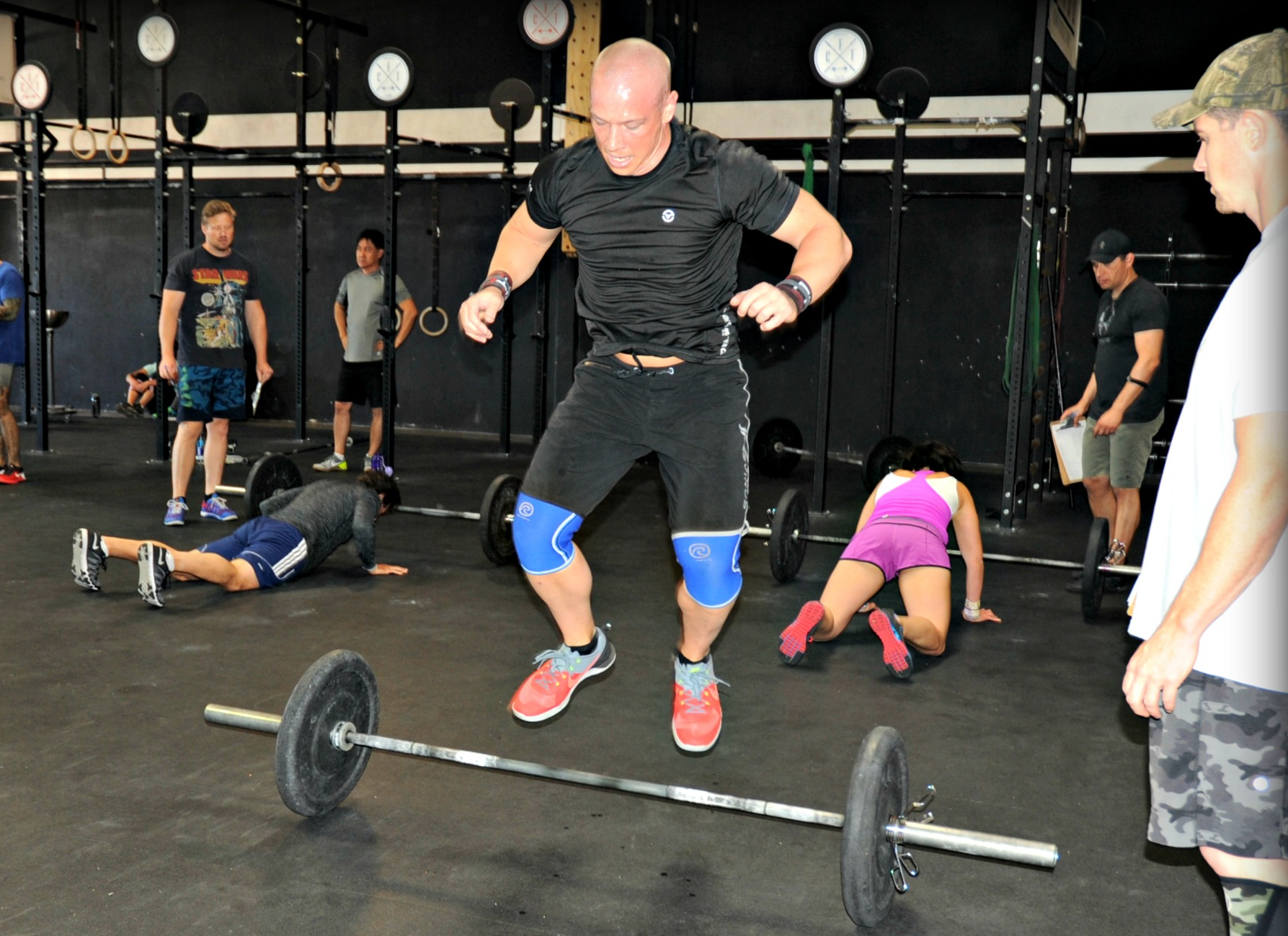
Participants in CrossFit Open performing a form of burpee

The CrossFit Games, created and directed by Dave Castro until 2021, have been held every summer since 2007. Athletes at the Games compete in workouts they learn about only hours in advance, sometimes featuring surprise elements not part of the typical CrossFit regimen. Past examples include a rough-water swim, a softball throw, and a pegboard climb. The Games are styled as a venue for determining the "Fittest on Earth", where competitors should be "ready for anything."

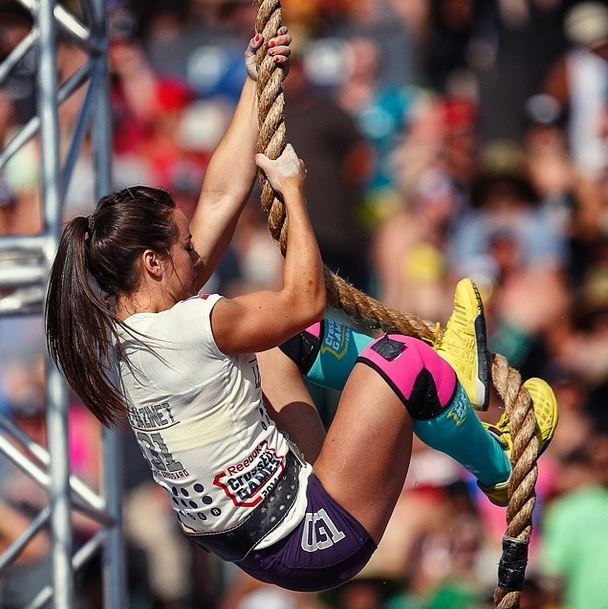
Rope climb at the 2014 Games with Camille Leblanc-Bazinet

In 2011, the Games adopted an online qualification format, facilitating participation by athletes worldwide. During the five-week-long "CrossFit Open", one new workout is released each week. Athletes have several days to complete the workout and submit their scores online, either with a video or with validation from a CrossFit affiliate. Since the Open is available to any level of athlete, many affiliates encourage member participations. The Open has been described as the largest participatory sporting event in the world, and the number of worldwide participants reached 415,000 in 2018.

From 2011 to 2018, the top CrossFit Open performers in each region, both individuals and teams, advanced to regional events held over the following two months worldwide. Each regional event qualifies a specified number of its top finishers for the Games. The Games include divisions for individuals of each gender, co-ed teams, and a number of Masters and Teenage age groups.

For the 2019 Games, regionals were discontinued and individual athletes qualify by either being the national champion in the Open, finishing in the top 20 worldwide in the Open, winning a CrossFit-sanctioned event, or by invitation. In 2020, the COVID-19 pandemic forced the 2020 CrossFit Games to be separated into two parts, with the first part consisting of an online contest for 60 athletes, from which five male and five female qualified for an in-person competition in Aromas, California. The Games format returned to normal in 2021, but the qualification system was revamped; the participants qualified based on their continental regions, and a Quarterfinal stage was added between the Open and the Semifinals.

During the 2024 CrossFit Games, athlete Lazar Dukic died in the run-swim event in Ft. Worth, Texas. After the day's suspension, the games resumed on Friday following a tribute to Lazar. Some athletes chose not to compete after his death, including both champions from 2023. The Quarterfinals were removed in 2025 (but restored in 2026), and only 30 men, 30 women and 20 teams can qualify for the Games.

== Certifications ==
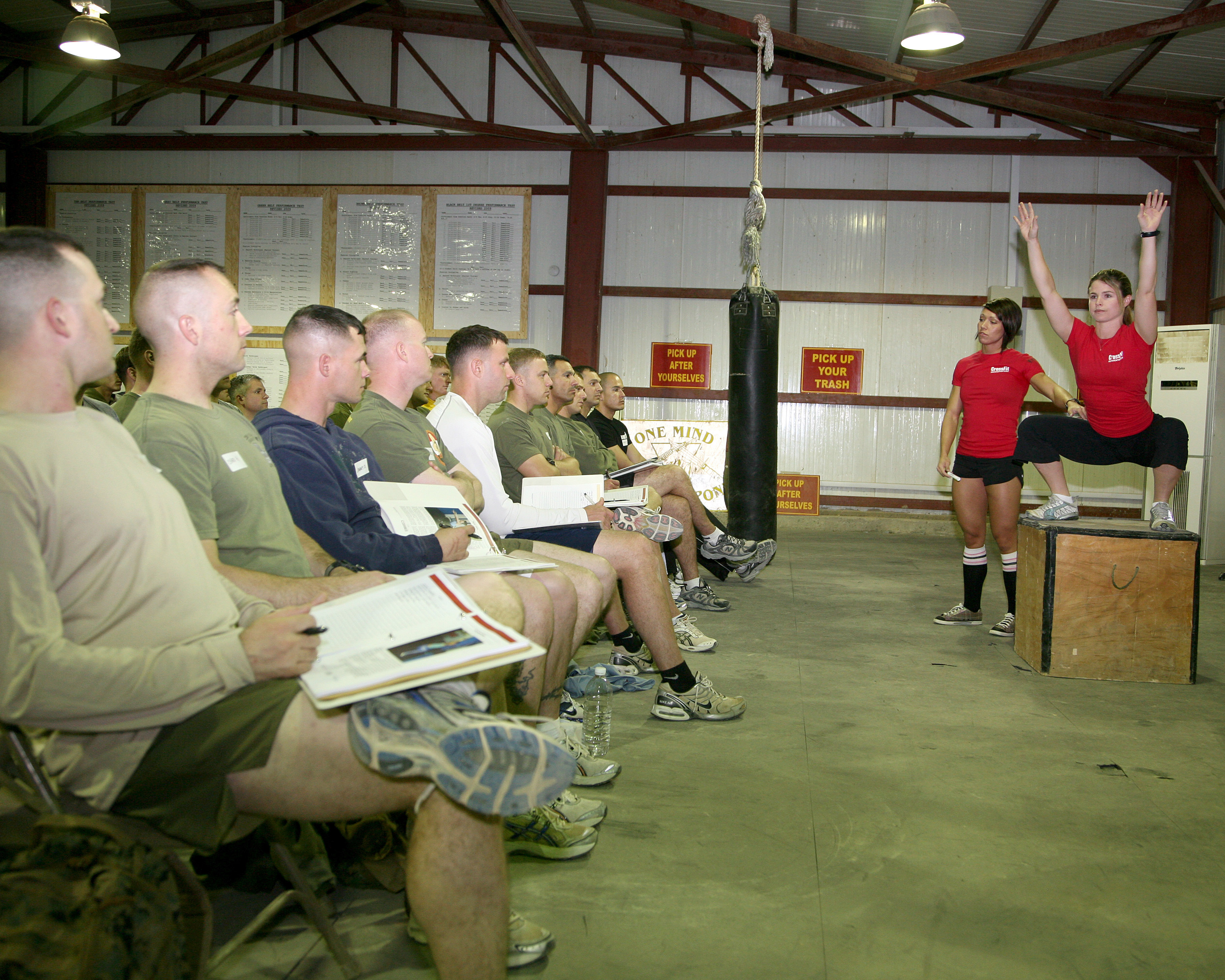
CrossFit staff demonstrating squat techniques during a level one CrossFit instructor certification at a military base

There are four levels of CrossFit coach certification. To open a CrossFit-affiliated gym, it originally only required a coach to be certified to level one. In late 2023, the requirement for owners of affiliated gyms was raised to level two.

Level One (CF-L1) is the introductory level, where participants attend a weekend group class, discuss the basic methodology and fundamentals of CrossFit, and learn how to conduct their own classes. They go over techniques and how to adjust them for those who cannot perform them. After completing the Level One training course, one should be confident in conducting a class, scaling workouts appropriately for athletes, and upholding CrossFit standards.

In the second level, training goes deeper into the mechanics of the movements and how to be a leader and communicate with other students. In the Level Two course, participants learn about athletic capacity and are evaluated as trainers in groups.

To earn the Level Three certificate, a coach must complete 1,500 hours of active fitness coaching and become CPR certified. To maintain the certification, Level 3 coaches must obtain 50 continuing education units every three years. To earn the Level Four certificate, the highest level currently recognized by CrossFit, Inc., the coach must record several years as a Level Three and pass a test.

== Criticism ==
=== Injury ===
Movements such as bar muscle-ups, pull-ups, or Olympic lifts involving a high load on the shoulder moving through a wide range of motion may cause shoulder injury if performed incorrectly or when fatigued.

The risk of injury associated with CrossFit training has been a subject of controversy since the program's popularity began to climb in the early 2000s. Critics have accused CrossFit, Inc. of using dangerous movements and inappropriate levels of intensity, and allowing underqualified individuals to become CrossFit trainers.

In response to these criticisms, CrossFit, Inc. says, "CrossFit is relatively safe even when performed with poor technique, but it is safer and more effective when performed with good technique." CrossFit, Inc. also says the risk of injury can be reduced by properly scaling and modifying workouts, a concept taught on its website and at the CrossFit Level 1 Trainer Course.

CrossFit supports this position by citing three academic surveys of CrossFit participants. These surveys calculated injury rates between 2.4 and 3.1 injuries per 1000 hours of training, which CrossFit argues is consistent with or below injury rates found in "general fitness training". An independent 2018 review of scientific literature also found that "injury rate with CrossFit was comparable to or lower than injury rates with Olympic weightlifting, distance running, military conditioning, track and field, rugby, or gymnastics." The review found that more men than women suffered from injuries in CrossFit, with injuries to the shoulders found to be more common (25%) than lower back (14.3%) and knee (13.1%), and injuries may occur in situations where supervision was not always available to athletes.

=== Lawsuit by CrossFit, Inc. against the NSCA ===
A 2013 study published in the Journal of Strength and Conditioning Research entitled "Crossfit-based high-intensity power training improves maximal aerobic fitness and body composition" followed 54 participants for ten weeks of CrossFit training. The study said, "...a notable percentage of our subjects (16%) did not complete the training program and return for follow-up testing." "The authors said, "This may call into question the risk-benefit ratio for such extreme training programs...". In an erratum later published by the journal, it is stated that "after the article was published, 10 of the 11 participants who did not complete the study have provided their reasons for not finishing, with only 2 mentioning injury or health conditions that prevented them from completing follow-up testing."

In 2014, CrossFit, Inc. filed a lawsuit against the National Strength and Conditioning Association (NSCA) over the publication of this study, alleging that the data were false and "intended to scare participants away from CrossFit." The NSCA denies CrossFit, Inc.'s allegations but issued an erratum acknowledging that the injury data were incorrect.

In September 2016, the District Court ruled in favor of CrossFit because the injury data were found to be false, but not that the NSCA was commercially motivated or that publishing the study was defamatory, as the NSCA no longer stood behind the study. The Journal of Strength and Conditioning Research eventually retracted the paper in its July 2017 issue.

In February 2017, CrossFit filed for sanctions against the NSCA after one of the NSCA's witnesses admitted to falsifying statements during deposition. In May 2017, the Court issued 17 issues sanctions against the NSCA, writing that the organization did have a commercial motive to falsify the data, had published the false data knowingly to disparage CrossFit, and had misled the public with their erratum. CrossFit was awarded $74,000 in legal fees and was allowed to continue investigating the NSCA. If the neutral-party analysis of the NSCA servers uncovers any additional misconduct, CrossFit may file an amended complaint seeking further sanctions and compensation for lost revenue. On December 4, 2019, CrossFit was awarded $4 million in sanction not including damages from the case.

In May 2017, CrossFit, Inc. contacted the Orthopaedic Journal of Sports Medicine with a demand for the retraction of another paper, published in the journal earlier that month. The paper states that CrossFit participants "are more likely to be injured and to seek medical treatment compared with participants in traditional weightlifting", a finding that CrossFit, Inc. said was based on scientific errors and material from retracted or misrepresented studies.

=== Exertional rhabdomyolysis ===
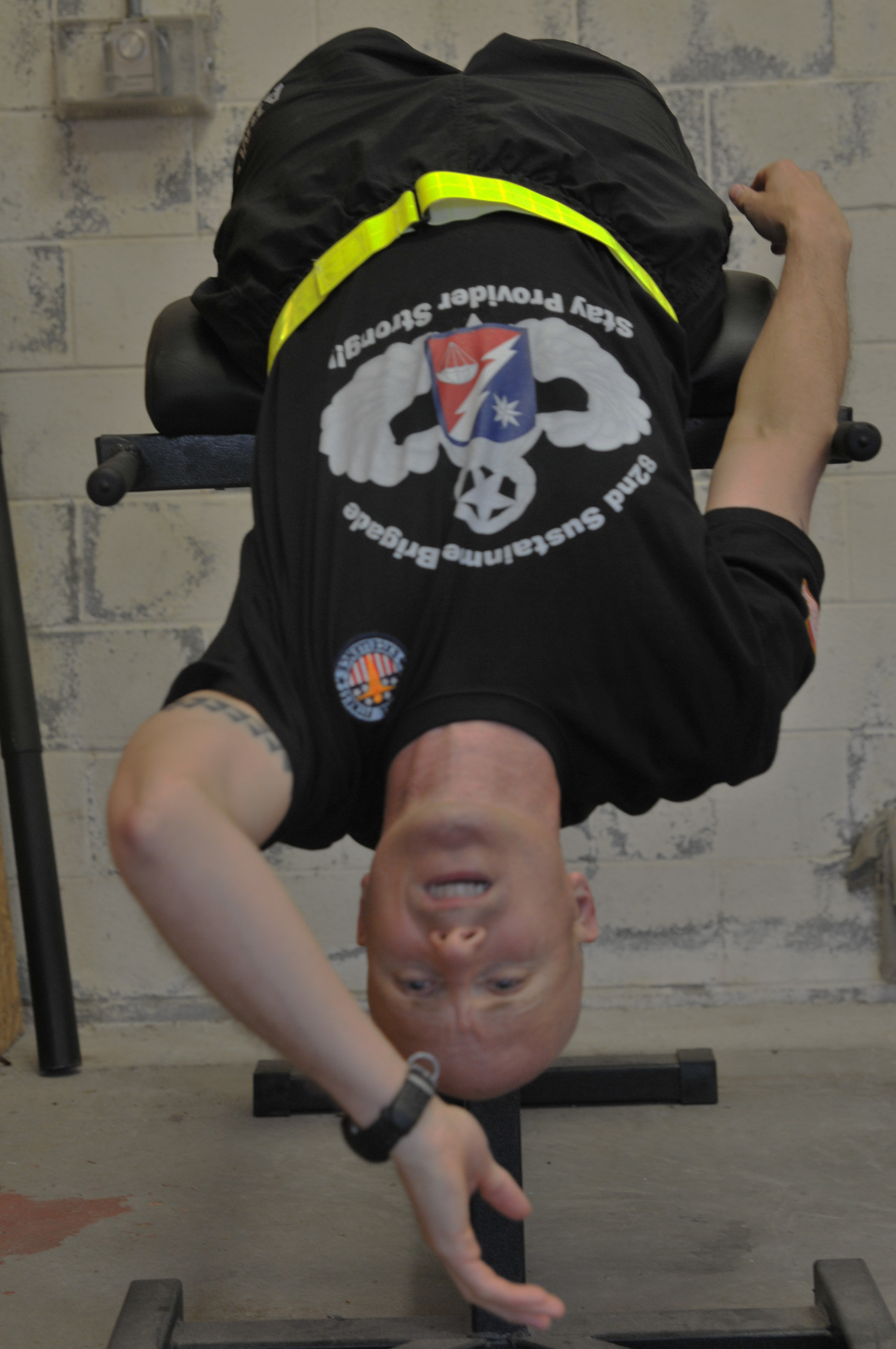
Movements involving eccentric contraction of muscles, e.g. sit-ups on a GHD machine here, can cause exertional rhabdomyolysis if performed at high volume.

Exertional rhabdomyolysis is a condition that can affect athletes in many sports, especially endurance sports such as marathon running and triathlon, and athletes who perform a high volume of exercise movements involving eccentric contraction or intense exercises when in excessive fatigue, particularly when the exercises are performed in extremes of heat. The relationship between CrossFit and exertional rhabdomyolysis has been a subject of controversy for the company. Some medical professionals have asserted that both the CrossFit methodology and the environment created by CrossFit trainers put athletes at high risk for developing rhabdomyolysis.

A man successfully sued his uncertified CrossFit trainers and was awarded US$300,000 in damages, after he suffered from rhabdomyolysis after performing a CrossFit workout on December 11, 2005, at Manassas World Gym in Manassas, Virginia, under the trainers' supervision. CrossFit, Inc. was not listed as a defendant in the lawsuit.

CrossFit, Inc. does not dispute that its methodology may cause rhabdomyolysis. The company states that exertional rhabdomyolysis can be found in a wide variety of sports and training populations and argues that its critics have conflated CrossFit's high awareness of rhabdomyolysis with high risk. One CrossFit spokesman stated that "ESPN's report on the 53 deaths in US triathlons from 2007 to 2013 should have put the issue to rest."

Since May 2005, CrossFit, Inc. has published several articles about rhabdomyolysis in the company's CrossFit Journal. Three of the articles are included in the CrossFit Manual provided to all prospective trainers.

CrossFit, Inc. has also been criticized for having a "cavalier" attitude towards rhabdomyolysis by promoting a character known as "Uncle Rhabdo": a cartoon clown dying dramatically—hooked up to a dialysis machine, with his kidneys and intestines falling on the floor. In response to this criticism, Greg Glassman stated, "We introduced (Uncle) Rhabdo because we're honest and believe that full disclosure of risk is the only ethical thing to do."

=== Social media controversies ===
CrossFit, Inc. has been variously criticized and praised for its unorthodox approach to social media. This approach has included publishing articles and tweets about non-fitness topics (including politics, philosophy, and poetry) as well as directly interacting with other social media users and critics of the company's program.

On June 4, 2014, CrossFit uploaded a parody video to their Facebook page of Jesus, featuring concepts such as the "Holy Trinity of exercise". Yasmine Hafiz wrote in The Huffington Post that some "viewers are outraged at the disrespectful use of a Christian symbol", with one user asking "on what planet is it comical or encouraged to mock someones belief?"

In June 2018, CrossFit fired its chief knowledge officer, Russell Berger, after Berger wrote about the LGBT community on Twitter. Berger's tweet followed the closure of a CrossFit location in Indianapolis after it faced backlash for canceling a special LGBT Pride Month workout. Berger wrote on Twitter, "As someone who personally believes celebrating 'pride' is a sin, I'd like to personally encourage #CrossFitInfiltrate for standing by their convictions and refusing to host an @indypride workout. The intolerance of the LGBTQ ideology toward any alternative views is mind-blowing." The tweet triggered angry responses denouncing Berger as a bigot and pressuring CEO Glassman for him to be fired; Berger was first placed on unpaid leave, but was later fired by Glassman, who publicly condemned Berger.

In May 2019, CrossFit shuttered its Facebook and Instagram accounts, which had 3.1 million and 2.8 million followers, respectively. On the company's homepage, the announcement stated that CrossFit was concerned about user privacy and security in the wake of "well-known public complaints about the social-media company that may adversely impact the security and privacy of our global CrossFit community." The company also cited intellectual property theft and Facebook's collusion with "food and beverage industry interests" as reasons for deactivating its social media accounts.

On June 6, 2020, the founder of CrossFit, Greg Glassman, tweeted, "It's: FLOYD-19" in response to a tweet from the Institute for Health Metrics and Evaluation at the University of Washington that states, "racism and discrimination are critical public health issues that demand an urgent response." Glassman's tweet was widely panned; many CrossFit-affiliated gyms around the world responded by ending their affiliation, and Reebok also announced that they would end their corporate association. Glassman also hosted a criticized Zoom call with CrossFit gym owners where he propounded conspiracy theories about COVID-19 and claimed that the murder of George Floyd had been part of an elaborate cover-up of counterfeiting unrelated to racism. On June 9, 2020, Glassman resigned as CEO then two weeks later announced he had put the company up for sale.

=== Death of Lazar Đukić ===
At the 2024 CrossFit Games, a Serbian athlete, Lazar Đukić, died from drowning in the first event that involved an open-water swim. Criticisms have been voiced on the decision to hold an outdoor run and swim event in the heat of Texas, where the water temperature may be too high to be safe, and on the inadequate provision of lifeguards and safety personnel at the event. Athletes and coaches also said that CrossFit had ignored safety concerns expressed by athletes over many years. Some athletes also criticized the decision to continue with the Games, when the leader of the sports team, Dave Castro, made a false claim that the Đukić family wanted the Games to continue as a tribute to Lazar in order to convince the athletes to stay in the competition. A number of athletes including both 2023 champions Laura Horvath and Jeffrey Adler chose to withdraw from the competition. Horvath accused CrossFit of being responsible for Đukić's death, thought the response to Đukić's death "inhumane", and characterized CrossFit as a corporation driven by a basic instinct of "survival and profit". The Professional Fitness Athletes' Association (PFAA), a group representing the interest of CrossFit athletes, called for transparency on the investigation into the death, the creation of an independent safety team, and the removal of Dave Castro as leader of the sport team.

CrossFit, however, refused to publish the third-party investigation into Đukić's death, created its own safety advisory board, and kept Castro as leader of the sport team. It also established instead its own CrossFit Athlete Council as an alternative to PFAA. PFAA expressed its dissatisfaction with CrossFit's response and said that it would support any athlete should they wish to boycott the Games and explore alternative competition routes. A number of prominent athletes, including Patrick Vellner, Laura Horvath, and Annie Thorisdottir, opted not to take part in the 2025 Games season, and affiliates have announced their de-affiliation from CrossFit or non-participation in the Open. Participation in the CrossFit Open fell over 30% from nearly 350,000 athletes in 2024 to 234,000 in 2025, and more than 1,400 CrossFit gyms de-affiliated in 2024, in part due to the controversy.

== See also ==
- Aerobics
- Fitness and figure competition
- History of physical training and fitness
- Hyrox
- F45
- National Pro Grid League
- Power training
- Weight training
