= Camille Leblanc-Bazinet =

Canadian CrossFit Games athlete

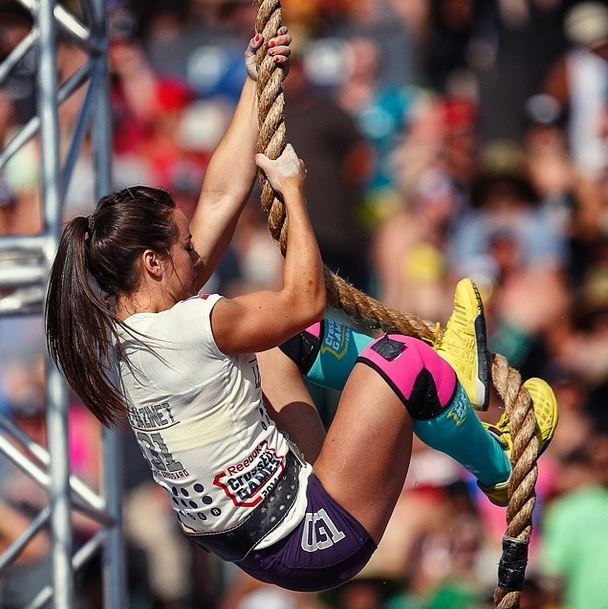

Personal information
- Born: October 10, 1988 (age 37) Richelieu, Quebec, Canada
- Education: Université de Sherbrooke
- Occupation: CrossFit Athlete
- Height: 5 ft 2 in (1.57 m)
- Weight: 130 lb (59 kg)
- Spouse: Dave Lipson (m. 2013)
- Children: 1 (b. 2020)

Sport
- Sport: CrossFit

Achievements and titles
- World finals: 2014 Crossfit Games Champion
- Regional finals: 2017 South Regional Runner-Up; Twice South Regional Champion (2015, 2016); 3-times Canada East Regional Champion (2011, 2013, 2014); 2012 Canada East Regional Runner-Up
- Personal bests: Clean and Jerk: 249 lb (113 kg); Snatch: 190 lb (86 kg); Deadlift: 300 lb (140 kg); Backsquat:310 lb (140 kg)

Camille Leblanc-Bazinet (born October 10, 1988) is a Canadian professional CrossFit Games athlete. She is the female winner of the 2014 CrossFit Games.

== Early life ==
Leblanc-Bazinet was born in Richelieu, Quebec on October 10, 1988, to Danielle Leblanc and Roger Bazinet. Throughout her early years, she did gymnastics at a high level for almost 14 years. At age 16, her career as a gymnast was stopped after tearing her hip. After recovering, she played senior AA soccer and volleyball. She later was the captain of her flag football team in college. Leblanc-Bazinet also spent time running half marathons, skiing, and playing rugby. In an interview, she said she was introduced to CrossFit after a man told her she was not in shape at a team party. Prior to joining, Leblanc-Bazinet's parents were "totally against it" and her friends believed that it was too dangerous. However, they all decided to give it a try and have continued.

== Personal life ==
In 2013, Leblanc-Bazinet married fellow CrossFitter, Dave Lipson. She earned a degree in chemical engineering from the Université de Sherbrooke. Her twin sister Rachel Leblanc-Bazinet is an Olympic weightlifter for Team Canada.

== CrossFit Games results ==
Year	Games	Regionals	Open (Worldwide)
2011	8th	1st (Canada East)	12th
2012	6th	2nd (Canada East)	5th
2013	16th	1st (Canada East)	2nd
2014	1st	1st (Canada East)	2nd
2015	13th	1st (South)	5th
2016	21st	1st (South)	7th
2017	39th (Note: Withdrew due to injury.)	2nd (South)	3rd
2018	13th	2nd (South)	4th
Year	Games	Qualifier	Open
2019	2nd Team (Note: On the CrossFit Krypton team.)	1st (Wodapalooza); Team (Note: Leblanc-Bazinet did not compete at Wodapalooza. Team CrossFit Krypton, as ROMWOD/WIT, won the team event to qualify for the CrossFit Games. Team member Jamie Greene then qualified for the Games as an individual. Krypton also won the Granite Games qualifier with Dani Speegle, who also had already qualified the Games. Leblanc-Bazinet was named as the replacement for the CrossFit Games.)	8601st (world); 4531st (United States)
