= Nobull =

American athletics company

Nobull, Inc.
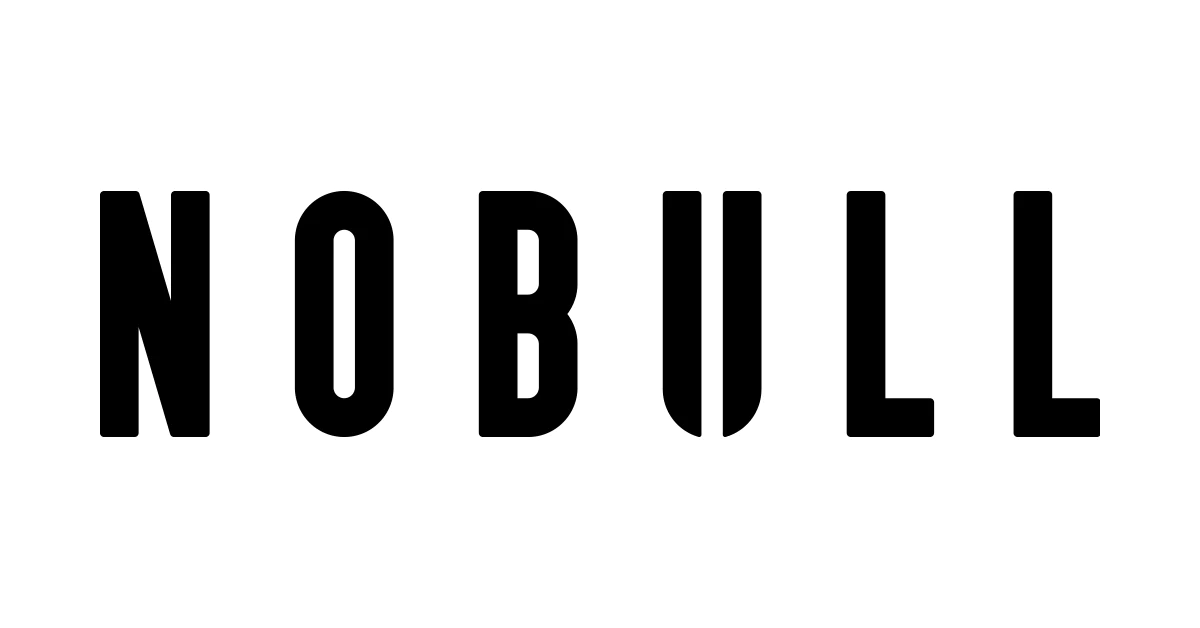
- Founded: 2015; 11 years ago in Boston, Massachusetts, U.S.
- Founder: Marcus Wilson
- Headquarters: Boston, Massachusetts, U.S.
- Number of locations: (2023)
- Key people: Mike Repole; Tom Brady
- Number of employees: ▼145 (2023)
- Website: https://www.nobullproject.com/

Nobull (stylized NOBULL) is an athletics company based in Boston, Massachusetts, that makes sportswear. Founded in 2015 by Marcus Wilson and Michael Schaeffer, the brand was closely associated with CrossFit but it has since expanded into other sports.

Starting with the 2023 NFL season, Nobull became the official sponsor of the NFL Scouting Combine, and also sponsors the PGA Tour, and San Francisco 49ers quarterback Mac Jones. It also sponsored the UFL for the 2026 season. It was the title sponsor of the CrossFit Games from 2021 to 2023.

== Etymology ==
According to Wilson and Schaeffer, the two worked together at Reebok before leaving to found Nobull. As both worked with each other's interests and personalities, they realized that they wanted a company that didn't "sell bullshit" to their customers. The name is therefore short for "no bullshit".

== History ==
Nobull was founded in 2015 by Wilson and Schaeffer in Boston. The company took a minimalist approach to its designs of sportwear such as shoes, and created products that are durable and functional across a range of movements. It claims to produce sportwear for a community of "people who work hard and don't believe in excuses". Its products initially catered to the CrossFit community.

The company grew strongly during the COVID-19 pandemic, and in 2021, it raised funding worth $32 million that valued the company at $500 million.

The company formed a partnership with CrossFit Games in 2021 when it became its title sponsor for three years. It also formed a six-year partnership with the PGA Tour in 2022, and the NFL Combine in 2023.

In December 2022, Nobull reportedly laid off 35 percent of its staff, with the founders citing "the challenging economic climate" and a desire to "safeguard the brand for the future", affecting 75 workers.

In July 2023, Mike Repole took a majority stake in the company. In January 2024, former New England Patriots quarterback Tom Brady agreed to merge his health and apparel brands with the company and to become its second largest shareholder.
