= National Pro Grid League =

Mixed gender sports organization that existed from 2014 to 2016

- Formerly: National Pro Fitness League (2014)
- Sport: Weightlifting; gymnastics; bodyweight maneuvers
- Founded: 2014
- First season: 2014
- Folded: 2016
- No. of teams: 8
- Country: United States
- Last champions: Phoenix Rise (1st title)
- Most titles: DC Brawlers (2 titles)
- Broadcaster: NBCSN
- Website: NPGL.com

The National Pro Grid League (NPGL) was a professional athletics organization consisting of mixed-gender teams that operated from 2014 through 2016. No NPGL events have occurred since the final matches in 2016. The teams compete in timed events in the competition space referred to as "the grid". The NPGL refers to the sport itself as GRID and describes it as "strategic team athletics racing".

== History ==
The sport was founded and developed by Tony Budding, a former employee of CrossFit Inc., who had had significant involvement in the CrossFit Games as media director. The NPGL was originally to be named the National Pro Fitness League. However, the acronym NPFL was deemed to be too similar to more popular National Football League (NFL), and the name was changed to the National Pro GRID League. Because of its similarities to CrossFit, Budding was able to secure early investors, a television contract with the NBC Sports Group, and an opening night in Madison Square Garden. However, the NPGL halted operations midway through its inaugural season due to potential investors' backing out. This led to cancellations of matches and caused the season to finish its finals in a format different from what was originally planned. Towards the end of the season, Budding was quietly let go as the CEO of the NPGL and replaced by Jim Kean, and Budding is no longer involved with the NPGL.

For the NPGL's second season, in 2015, matches were held at only certain locations where they would often host multiple matches in a single day. The opening weekend took place on June 13–14 during the FitExpo at the San Jose Convention Center in San Jose, California, and all eight teams competed. The second matches were held regionally; all four Eastern Conference teams played in Landover, Maryland, one match at Alameda County Fairgrounds in Pleasanton, California, and one match at BankUnited Center in Miami, Florida. The final matches of the season were held on August 22–23 during the FitExpo at the Anaheim Convention Center in Anaheim, California, where all eight teams once again competed. The entire postseason took place from September 16 to September 20, also at the Anaheim Convention Center.

Despite the league's initial strong ties to competitive CrossFit Games athletes, the DC Brawlers would win the NPGL Championship in the first two seasons using lesser known CrossFit competitors in their matches compared to other teams.

In 2016, the NPGL underwent a further consolidation of match locations for its third season. All matches were scheduled to be played with the same eight teams, each playing three matches, at the Utah Valley Convention Center in Provo, Utah, between August 17 and August 27, 2016. The postseason was also held at the Utah Valley Convention Center between September 2 and September 7. The previously undefeated DC Brawlers lost their first ever match in the semifinal on September 2 to the Boston Iron. The Phoenix Rise then defeated the Iron for the 2016 championship on September 7.

Circa January 2018, the official website became defunct. However, the sport of Grid continues through a different League called the United Grid League.

== Match formats ==
In the inaugural 2014 season, each Grid Match format was named after a prominent mountain, with current formats including Kilimanjaro, McKinley (later revamped slightly and called Denali in 2016), Pikes Peak, Everest, and Teton. In the second season, other prominent geographic landmarks were used such as Amazon. In the third season the final match is called Timpanogos, named after the most prominent mountain near the Utah Valley where all the 2016 season matches took place.

For each Grid "Match", two opposing teams compete in eleven races progressing across four quadrants of the Grid. Each of the eleven races had a specific format that remained consistent, although the individual athletic tasks performed during each race varied from match to match. The athletic tasks performed incorporate weightlifting, gymnastics and bodyweight maneuvers denominated as "Elements" of each race.

== Rules ==
In 2014, each roster consisted of ten men and ten women, but only five men and five women per team as starters, three men and three women on the bench as reserves, and two men and two women on the inactive roster. In 2015, the roster size was reduced from 20 to 18. Each team could only have 14 eligible players per match with only four players on the bench to act as substitutes for the ten starters. Once a substituted player took the place of one of the ten starters, the substituted player could not return for that match. In 2016, the team size of 18 remained the same but teams were allowed to have an additional six developmental players signed. The developmental players could not be used in matches during the season. Since the very first season, one starting athlete of each gender from each team must be 40 years of age or older. Each race is four to eight minutes in length.

== Television coverage ==
For 2014, the NPGL entered into an agreement with NBC Sports Group to televise the playoffs and championship on NBC Sports Network. The championships finals aired live on NBCSN on October 3, 2014, at 10:30 p.m. ET (22:30 ET), and a replay aired on NBC on October 5, 2014, at 1 p.m. ET (13:00 ET). The 2016 season was aired on Comcast, beIN Sports, Root Sports, and One World Sports. A 2026 United Grid League matchup was added to ESPN8 The Ocho.

== Teams ==
=== Active teams at league closing ===
- Baltimore Anthem (2015–2016)
- Boston Iron (2014–2016)
- DC Brawlers (2014–2016)
- Los Angeles Reign (2014–2016)
- Miami Surge (2014–2016)
- New York Rhinos (2014–2016)
- Phoenix Rise (2014–2016)
- San Francisco Fire (2014–2016)

=== Ceased operations ===
- Carolina Crush (2015) – announced as an expansion team for the 2015 season but later announced they would not participate due to not meeting league requirements
- Philadelphia Founders (2014) – competed in the inaugural 2014 season, but folded shortly thereafter

== Champions ==
Year	Champion	Runner-up	Match Format	Score	Location
2014	DC Brawlers	San Francisco Fire	Everest	20–16	Irvine, California
2015	DC Brawlers	Phoenix Rise	Amazon	18–17	Anaheim, California
2016	Phoenix Rise	Boston Iron	Timpanogos	21–14	Provo, Utah
