= 2007 CrossFit Games =

Athletic competition

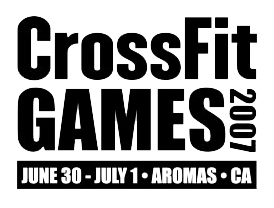
- Venue: CrossFit Ranch
- Location: Aromas, California
- Dates: June 30–July 1, 2007

Champions
- Men: James Fitzgerald
- Women: Jolie Gentry
- Team: CrossFit Santa Cruz

The 2007 CrossFit Games were the inaugural CrossFit Games, which were held on June 30 and July 1, 2007, on a ranch in Aromas, California.

There was no qualification process for the first Games, and around 70 athletes turned up to participate in the Games, along with around 150 spectators. There were three events, the first one selected at random on the day.

The men's individual competition was won by James Fitzgerald, the women's individual by Jolie Gentry. The Affiliate Cup was awarded to CrossFit Santa Cruz for the best combined team members' individual scores. From its inception, the CrossFit Games have awarded an equal sum in prize money to both the male and female winners of the individual competitions, which in the first year was $500.

== Origin ==
In early 2007, the then director of training of CrossFit Dave Castro invited CrossFit founder Greg Glassman to his family ranch in Aromas, California. Glassman liked the place, and suggested holding a "Woodstock of Fitness" at the ranch for the CrossFit community. After some discussion, they decided to hold CrossFit events at the ranch, where participants can camp and enjoy themselves. The first Games held therefore had the feel of a backyard barbecue with a few sporting events thrown in. In July 2007, the first CrossFit Games took place at the ranch, with Castro serving as the Games director.

== Events ==
The inaugural Games consisted of three events. The first two events were contested on Day 1, and the final event on Day 2. The first event was determined on the day by drawing colored balls at random from a hopper (using a peanut roaster), as the founder of CrossFit Greg Glassman believed that the fittest athletes should be able to handle any workout given.

The competitors were scored in each event according to their ranking, and after three events, the competitor with the highest score was crowned the winner. There were no separate team events, and the team winner was determined by combining the individual scores of the top two men and top two women of the affiliate in individual events. The Affiliate Cup was awarded to the winning team.

=== Event 1 ===
Hopper WOD – 1,000 meters on a Concept-2 rowing machine, followed by 5 rounds of 25 pullups and 7 push jerks. Push jerk barbell weight was 135 lb (61 kg) for the men and 95 lb (43 kg) for the women.

Brett Marshall won the event for the men, Jolie Gentry for the women.

=== Event 2 ===
Trail run – Run of approximately 5 kilometres (3 miles) in length over steep hilly terrain.

This endurance event was won by Chris Spealler for the men and Kate Hunt for the women.

=== Event 3 ===
CrossFit Total – combined weights of the heaviest back squat, shoulder press, and deadlift that each athlete could successfully complete for a single repetition. Athletes may have up to 3 attempts within a 4-minute window for each lift.

Connor Banks won for the men's competition, Nicole Dehart for the women's.

== Podium finishers ==
Place	Men	Women	Team
1st	James Fitzgerald	Jolie Gentry	CrossFit Santa Cruz
2nd	Brett Marshall	Mary Rigney	Brand X Martial Arts
3rd	Josh Everett	Nichole Dehart	Crossfit Marina
