= Push press =

Weightlifting exercise

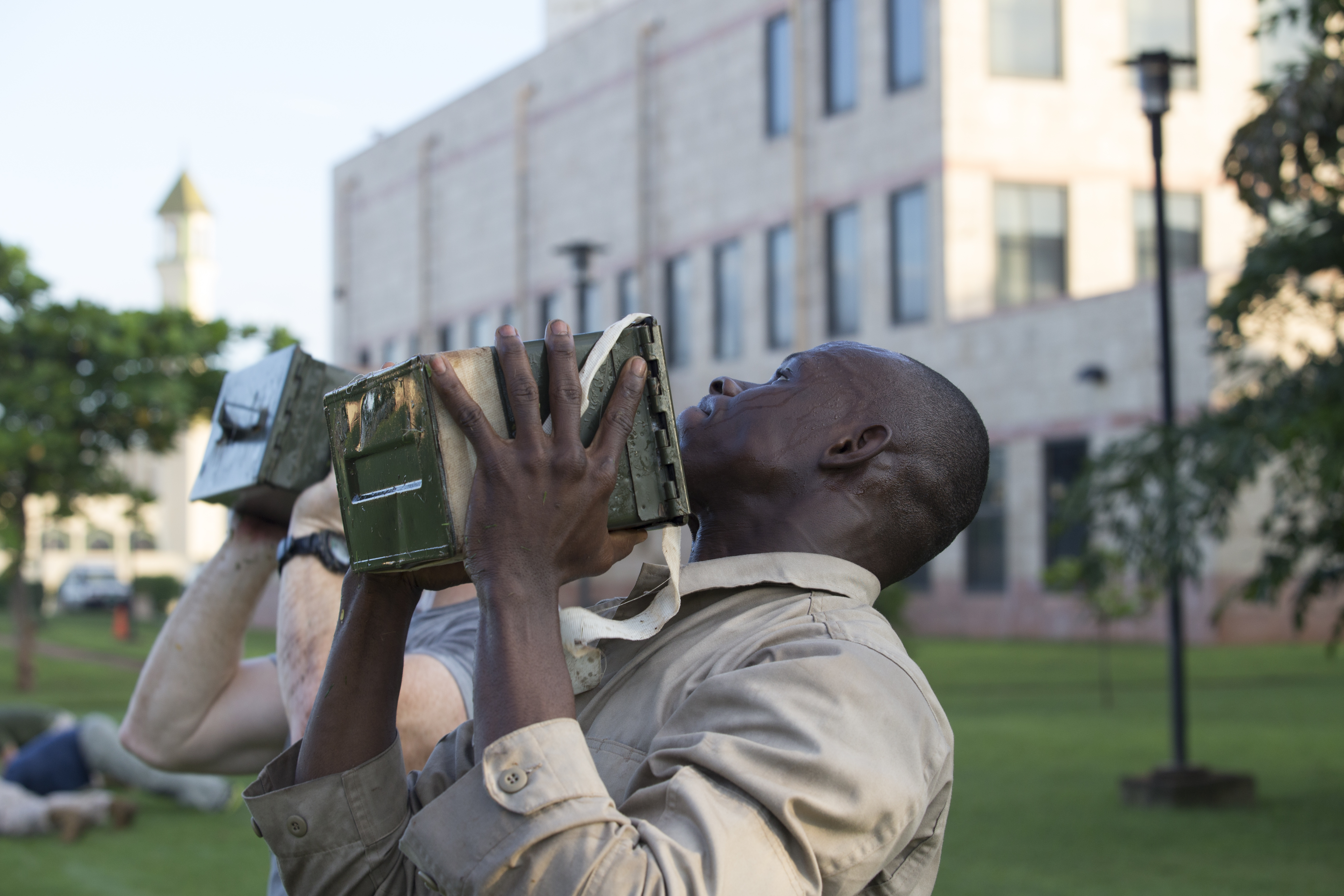
Ammo can push press

A push press is a weight training exercise for the anterior head of the deltoid (shoulder).

== Execution ==
The push press is similar to the military press, in that the bar is held just above chest height and is pushed upwards before being lowered back down again; however, the movement is started by a 'push' from the legs. This begins the momentum of the movement and helps with the lifting of the weight overhead. The bar is then slowly lowered back to the chest and the legs are slightly bent again ready to begin the next repetition. Alternatively, if the weight is so heavy that lowering it would be potentially unsafe, then it can be dropped from the overhead position onto surrounding padded flooring.

The push press can also be performed from behind the neck. These are sometimes not recommended though due to an increased risk of injury.

One-handed push presses can also be performed. These can help to increase core strength as it requires extra effort to stabilise the uncentred weight. In addition, as with other forms of unilateral work, they can help to reduce muscle imbalances in the body. For example, in a bilateral, two-handed push press, there may be an excessively large muscle imbalance meaning that the right side is performing 55% of the work and the left side 45%. By working each side individually, with the same weight, then it can be ensured that each side is performing the same amount of work, which in turn can help to reduce an excessive strength imbalance.

Push presses are also commonly performed with dumbbells and kettlebells.

== Purpose ==
The push press is used to help develop shoulder strength. It can be used to push past a sticking point or develop power for the Clean and Jerk (though 'pressing' is illegal in competition). The ability to drive from the legs and through the torso to the arms is important for sports (this is also found in the bench press).

== Advantages ==
The push press can improve all over body coordination (though not to the extent of the weightlifting movements). It can also allow a trainee to use the eccentric portion of the exercise with a weight that may be too heavy for the concentric phase, thereby increasing strength.

== Drawbacks ==
As the momentum is initiated by the legs, the bottom portion of the range of motion may be under-developed compared to the middle and end portions. The entire range of motion is more reliably trained in a shoulder press. One method of training is to initiate lifting with a shoulder press, and then gradually turning it into a push press when the lifter no longer has the strength to lift it with his shoulders alone and does not want to train with a lighter weight.
