= The Yoddha Race =

Indian competitive fitness event

- Country: India
- Inaugurated: 2024
- Founders: Adnan Adeeb, Zeba Zaidi
- Organiser: Spectacom Global
- Prize money: INR 25 Lakhs
- Website: https://www.theyoddharace.com/

The Yoddha Race is an Indian competitive fitness race that combines distance running with functional gym-style workouts. The event is structured as a multi-city season circuit culminating in a national grand finale. The race is widely described as offering the largest cash prize pool in fitness racing in India, with up to ₹25 lakh on the line. The categories include Male Open, Female Open, Male Doubles, Female Doubles & Mixed Doubles.

The word Yoddha (योद्धा) is a Sanskrit and Hindi term meaning warrior or fighter, reflecting the event's philosophy of testing both running endurance and strength under competition conditions. The race is positioned as a hybrid sport bridging road-running culture and the CrossFit/functional-fitness community in India.

== History ==
The Yoddha Race was inaugurated in 2024 with its first season covering four cities: Delhi, Mumbai, Bengaluru, and Hyderabad. The debut season established the event's core format of combining competitive running with functional workout stations, and introduced the concept of a multi-city circuit culminating in a national grand finale.

The second season, held in 2025, expanded the circuit to six cities with the addition of Chandigarh and Chennai, reflecting growing participation and interest across India.

Season 3 has since been announced, with Ahmedabad replacing Chennai in the city lineup, continuing the event's expansion into new fitness markets across the country.

== Concept and Format ==
The signature format consists of 7 rounds, each requiring the participant to complete a 700-metre run immediately followed by one functional workout station. Athletes must complete all seven rounds in the correct sequence and in the shortest possible time. The race rewards athletes who can efficiently manage both cardiovascular pacing and muscular fatigue simultaneously.

The seven functional workout stations are drawn from CrossFit-style and gym-based training: Rowing (1,000 metres), Sled Push (50 metres), Sled Pull (50 metres), Kettlebell Carry (200 metres), Box Jumps (30 repetitions), Lunge Walk (100 metres), and Wall Ball Throws. Each station is completed in full before the athlete proceeds to the next 700-metre run segment, testing strength, endurance, and coordination across all major muscle groups.
