= Fearleaders =

- Founded: 2013
- Members: 28
- Website: https://www.fearleadersvienna.com/

The Fearleaders is a cheerleading group founded in 2013 in Vienna. They are Europe's first all male squad and cheers at Austria's women's roller derby matches. The team's uniforms are 80s orange/turquoise kitsch with sweatbands, suspenders and tight shorts. Their operations are funded by calendar sales and, in addition to roller derby halftime shows, they have performed at TEDx and at the closing ceremonies of the 2024 EuroGames.
