= 2026 Hyrox Beijing diarrhea incident =

Sports event incident in Beijing, China

Logo of Hyrox

The 2026 Hyrox Beijing diarrhea incident caused professional athlete Joanna Wietrzyk to become the subject of international media attention. In September 2026, she suffered from faecal incontinence during a Hyrox race in Beijing, China. Wietrzyk continued to participate, despite contaminating the track and shared equipment with diarrhea. The event led to global rule changes within the sport.

== Athlete ==
Joanna Wietrzyk (/ˈwɛ.trɪk/, born 7 June 2002) is an Australian professional athlete and fitness coach. She is the current women's solo professional Hyrox world record holder and was the first Australian woman to qualify for the sport's elite competitive tier, the Elite 15 Series.

== Competition ==
A Hyrox competition is made up of eight 1-kilometre (0.62 mi) runs, each followed by one of eight different functional workout stations. The events are standardized across all locations, allowing athletes to compare results globally. Each race is hosted indoors in exhibition halls or convention centers.

The Hyrox Beijing event was held at the National Speed Skating Oval from 10 September 2026 to 13 September 2026.

=== Rulebook ===
The rulebook did not cover feces, but had rules against spitting and nose blowing onto the floor.

== Incident ==
On 12 September 2026, Wietrzyk competed in the Hyrox Beijing event held at the National Speed Skating Oval in China. Wietrzyk had contracted food poisoning shortly before the race which caused her to have bowel incontinence, of which she felt no symptoms. At the fourth exercise station – burpee broad jumps – which Wietrzyk found especially challenging, she experienced a sudden onset of diarrhea. With her legs and arms visibly covered in diarrhea, she continued to compete in the event without intervention from officials, which raised concerns about exposure to biohazards due to her excrement contaminating the track and shared equipment, including a rowing machine. Competitors were disrupted by the incident, with runners behind her reportedly slipping in the fecal matter. Wietrzyk ultimately won the race.

== Backlash ==
The incident attracted international attention on social media, with discussion focusing on hygiene, competitor safety, and sporting conduct. Some competitors reported slipping on the affected section of the track. Wietrzyk continued to draw criticism for not issuing an apology, instead issuing a now-deleted Instagram post stating, "Go hard or go home ... a win is a win." Following the backlash, Wietrzyk chose to "retroactively withdraw" from the race and forfeit her victory. She was a brand representative for Puma, a Hyrox sponsor, but after this incident the sportswear company removed her retail line. Wietrzyk offered an apology five days after the incident on her Instagram page.

Hyrox co-founder, Moritz Fürste, subsequently apologised for the organisation's handling of the incident, stating that Hyrox "made a mistake by not reacting immediately during the race" and that new rules and procedures were implemented to prevent similar situations in the future. After Wietrzyk's identity was shared online, she received personal attacks, prompting her coach, Chris Bayens, to speak publicly against the abuse. Hyrox also stated that individuals who sent abusive messages or threats to Wietrzyk would be banned from future events. Following the event, Fürste announced that the organization had introduced immediate changes to its rulebook and procedures to prevent similar incidents. Hyrox offered refunds to the more than 1,000 competitors who were impacted by Wietrzyk.

== See also ==
- Runner's diarrhea
