= EuroGames Vienna 2024 =

Video address of Volker Türk, UN High Commissioner for Human Rights

The EuroGames Vienna was an instance of EuroGames, an international multi-sport event organized primarily by and for the European LGBTIQ+ sport community, held from 17 to 20 July 2024, in Vienna, Austria. With approximately 4,000 athletes event was organized under the motto "Embrace Diversity."

== Bidding ==
The Vienna organizers were awarded license to host for 2024 by the European Gay & Lesbian Sport Federation (EGLSF) after Vienna-based sports clubs Aufschlag Wien and Kraulquappen Wien successfully bid to host the games, competing next to the city of Birmingham, UK.

On 28 December 2021, the EGLSF announced that Vienna had won the most votes of its members in exceptional (online assembly) pandemic context after the cancellation of EuroGames in Düsseldorf in 2020 and modified 2021 Copenhagen.

== Vienna hosting ==
EuroGames Village video, Karlsplatz

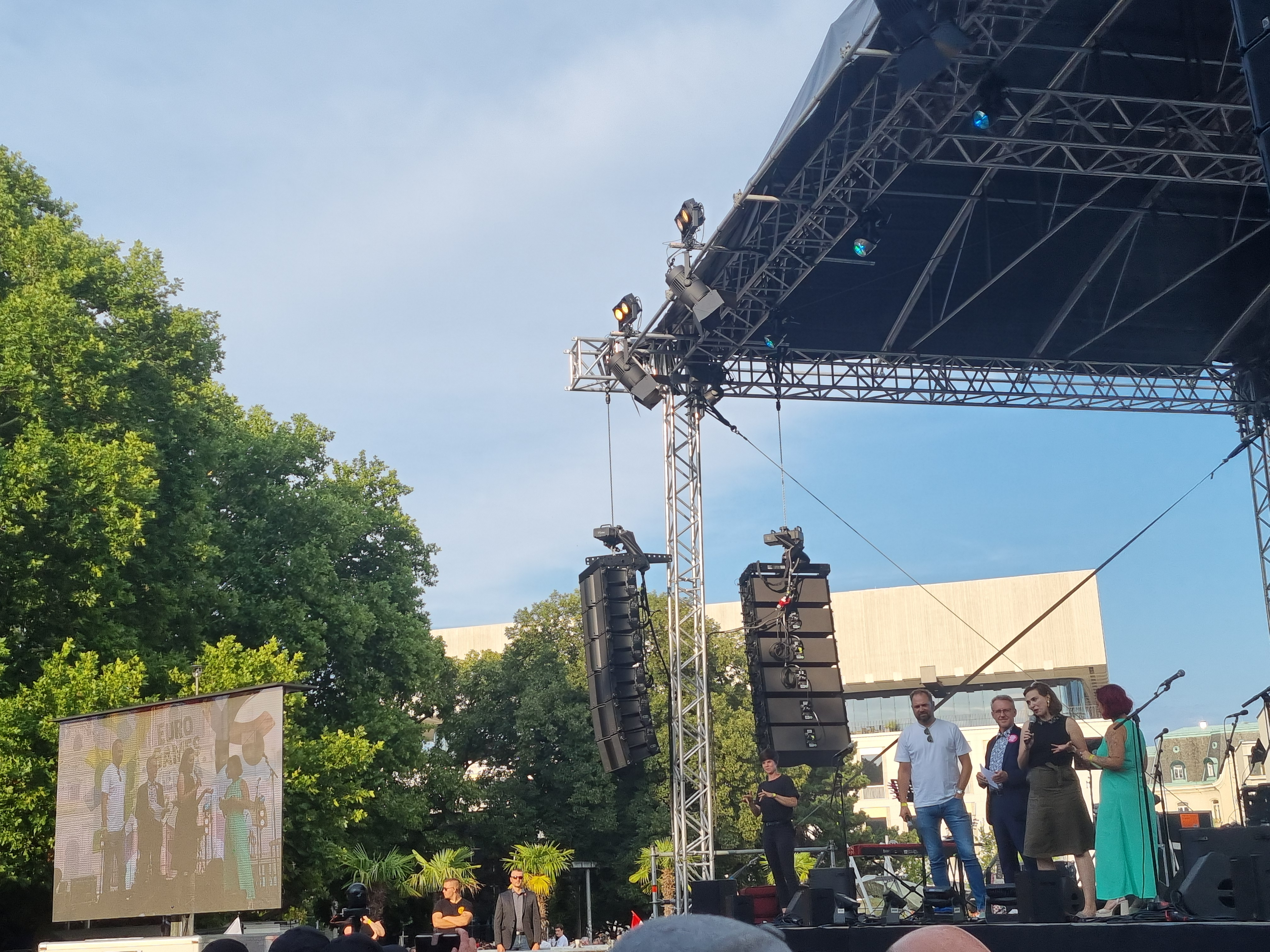
Austrian Minister of Justice Alma Zadić at the opening ceremony

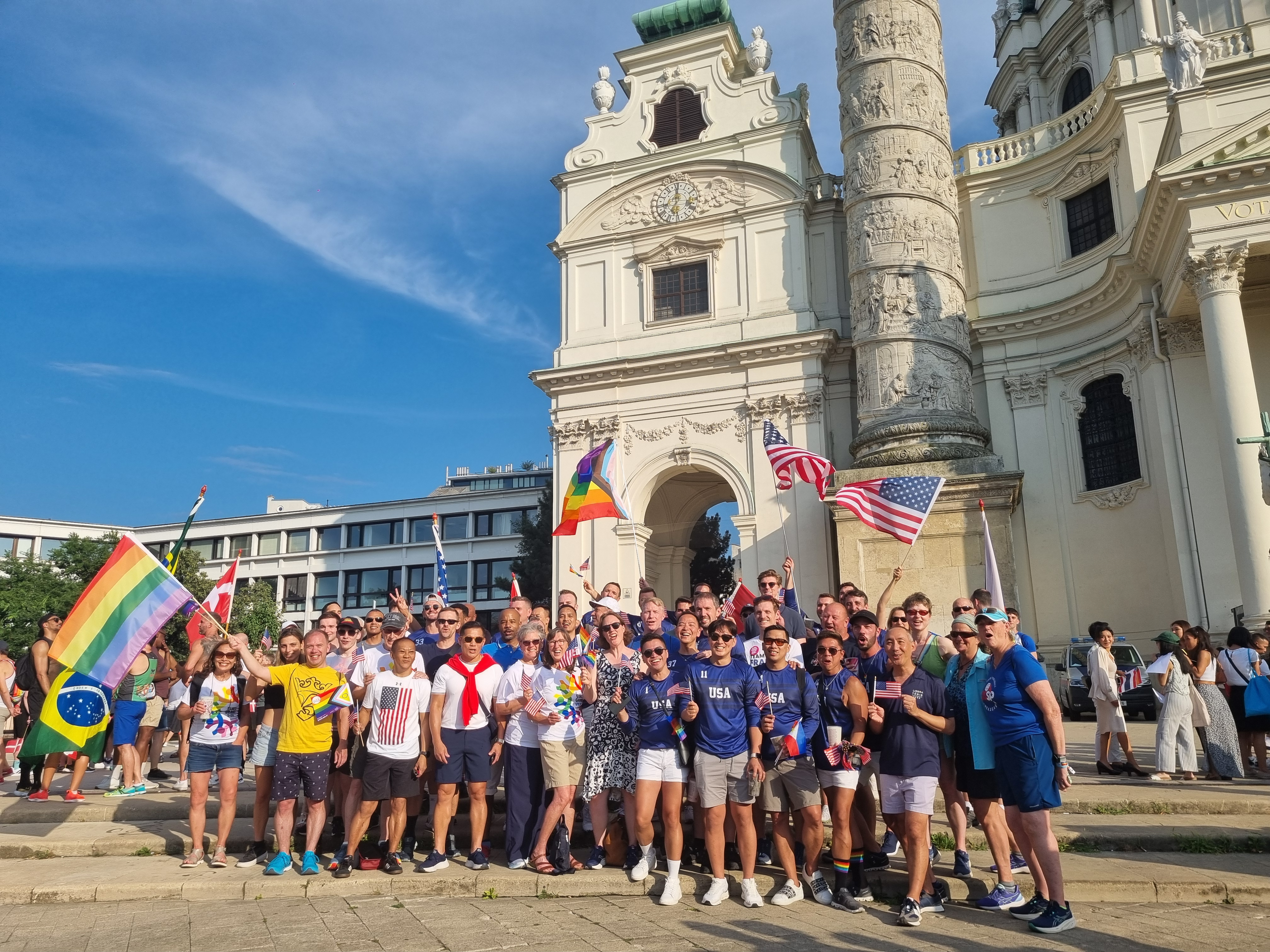
USA contestants at EuroGames

EuroGames 2024 had its kick-off presentation and promotion event as a part of Vienna Pride programs on June 9, 2023 at the Vienna City Hall, with councilor Thomas Weber, from EuroGames Vienna team Ulrike Lunacek and Gerhard Marchl, president of organization. In line with the motto "Embrace Diversity", the EuroGames Vienna 2024 celebrated the diversity of participants and sports alike. The event challenged and aspired to overcame traditional gender-binary and hetero-normative structures in sport event organizing.

"Vienna is a cosmopolitan and diverse city and, as the rainbow capital, also sets international standards in the area of LGBTIQ equality. As the city councilor responsible for the LGBTIQ community, I am delighted that the topic of sport is thus increasingly finding its way into the Viennese community and hopefully many queer people in Vienna will be able to overcome their fear of contact with sports clubs or even unpleasant experiences in their youth," stated Christoph Wiederkehr, Vienna Deputy Mayor.

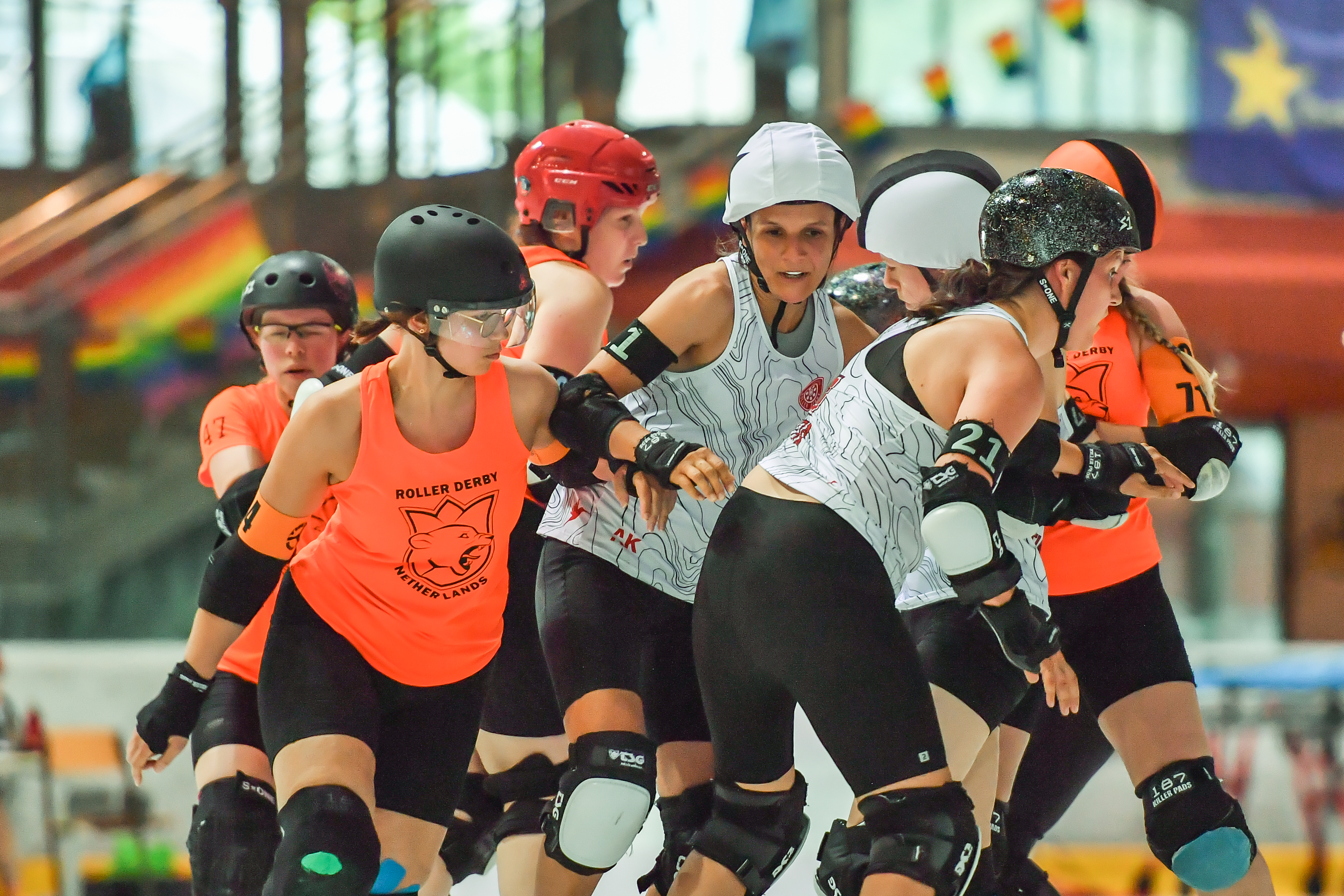
Austria vs. The Netherlands in roller derby at EuroGames 2024

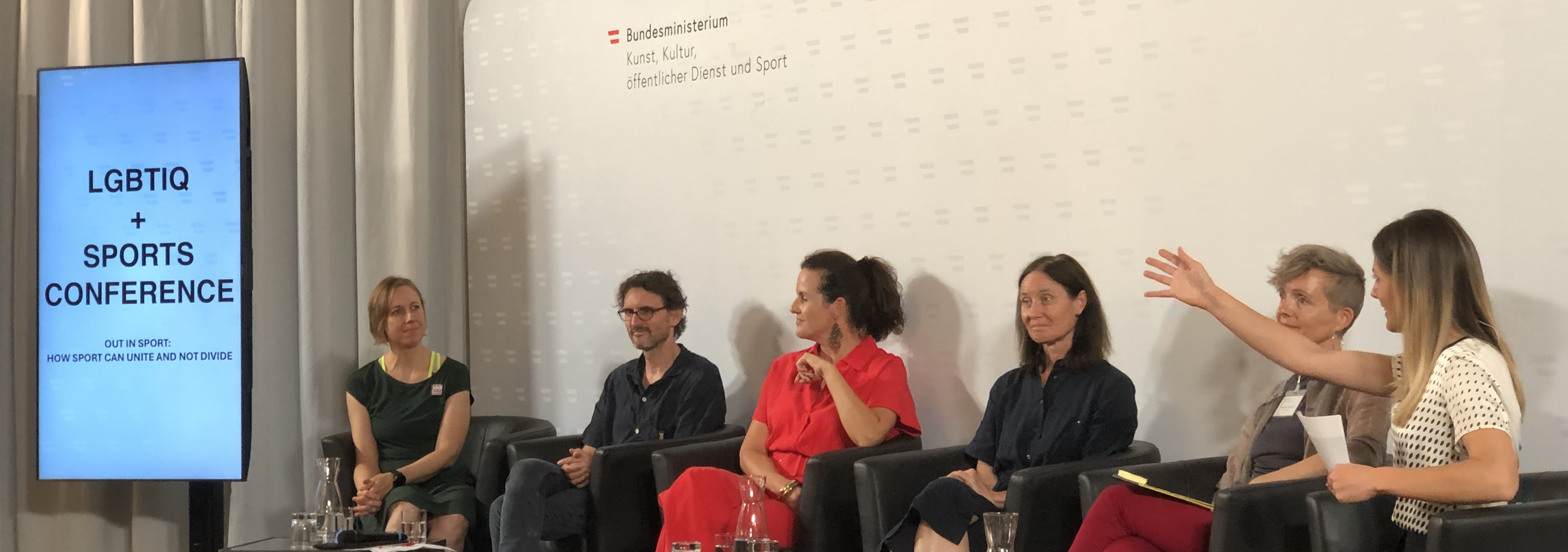
"Out in Sport" conference panel

EuroGames were held from July 17 to 20, 2024, with the opening and closing ceremonies at EuroGames Village at Karlsplatz, in the historic core of Vienna. The opening show featured Conchita Wurst, while Clara Luzia performed at the closing ceremony.

The program included 31 sports, featuring most favored badminton, soccer, swimming, tennis, and volleyball. Additionally, recreational activities and new sports made their EuroGames debut, including roller derby, table football, roundnet, racketlon, darts, and padel. Events were spread across 33 venues across Vienna.

On the EuroGames opening day sports conference named "Out in Sport - How Sport can Unite and not Divide" included many prominent Austrian and few international speakers and was broadcast by national television ORF.

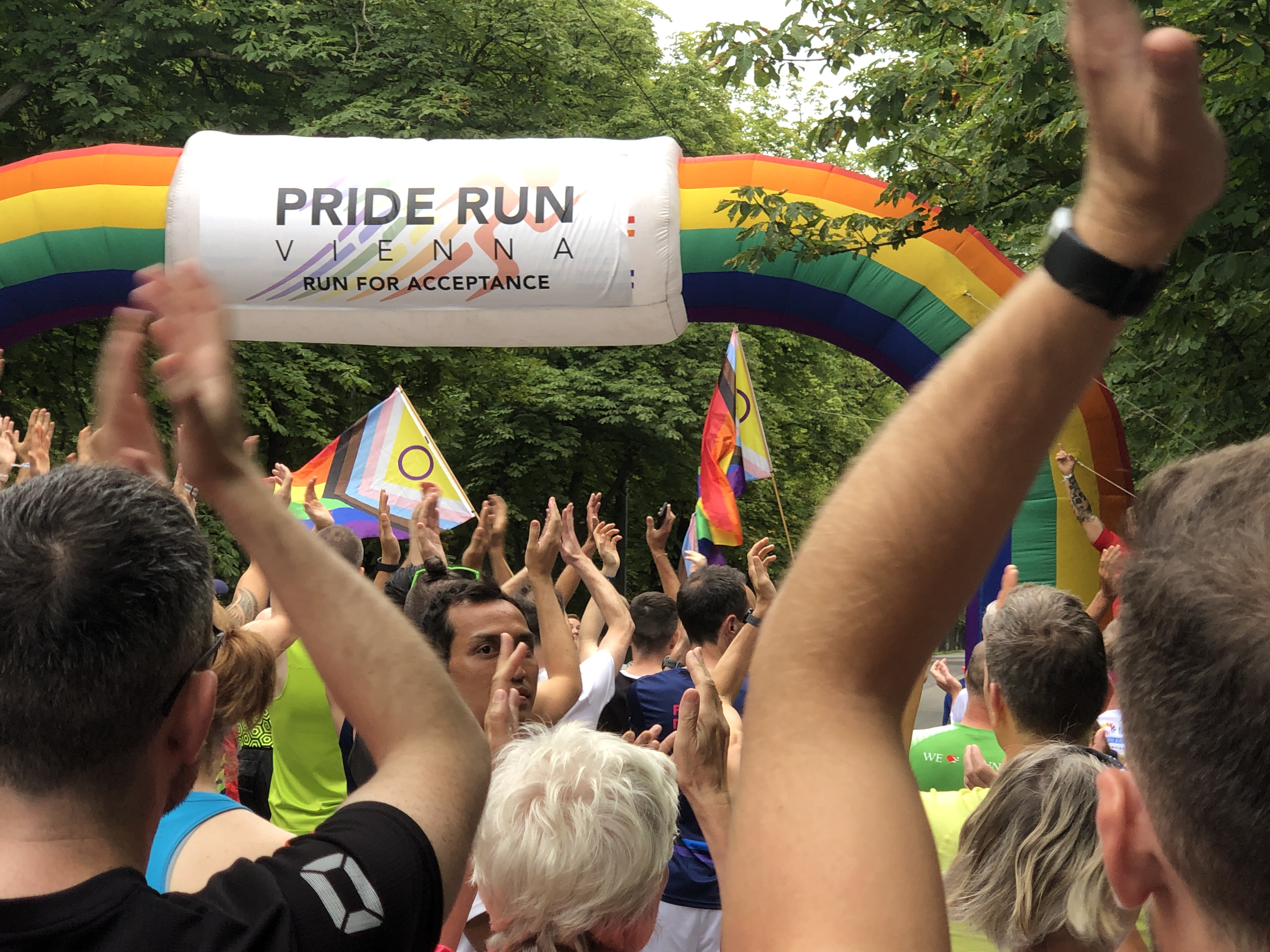
Pride Run Vienna finish line

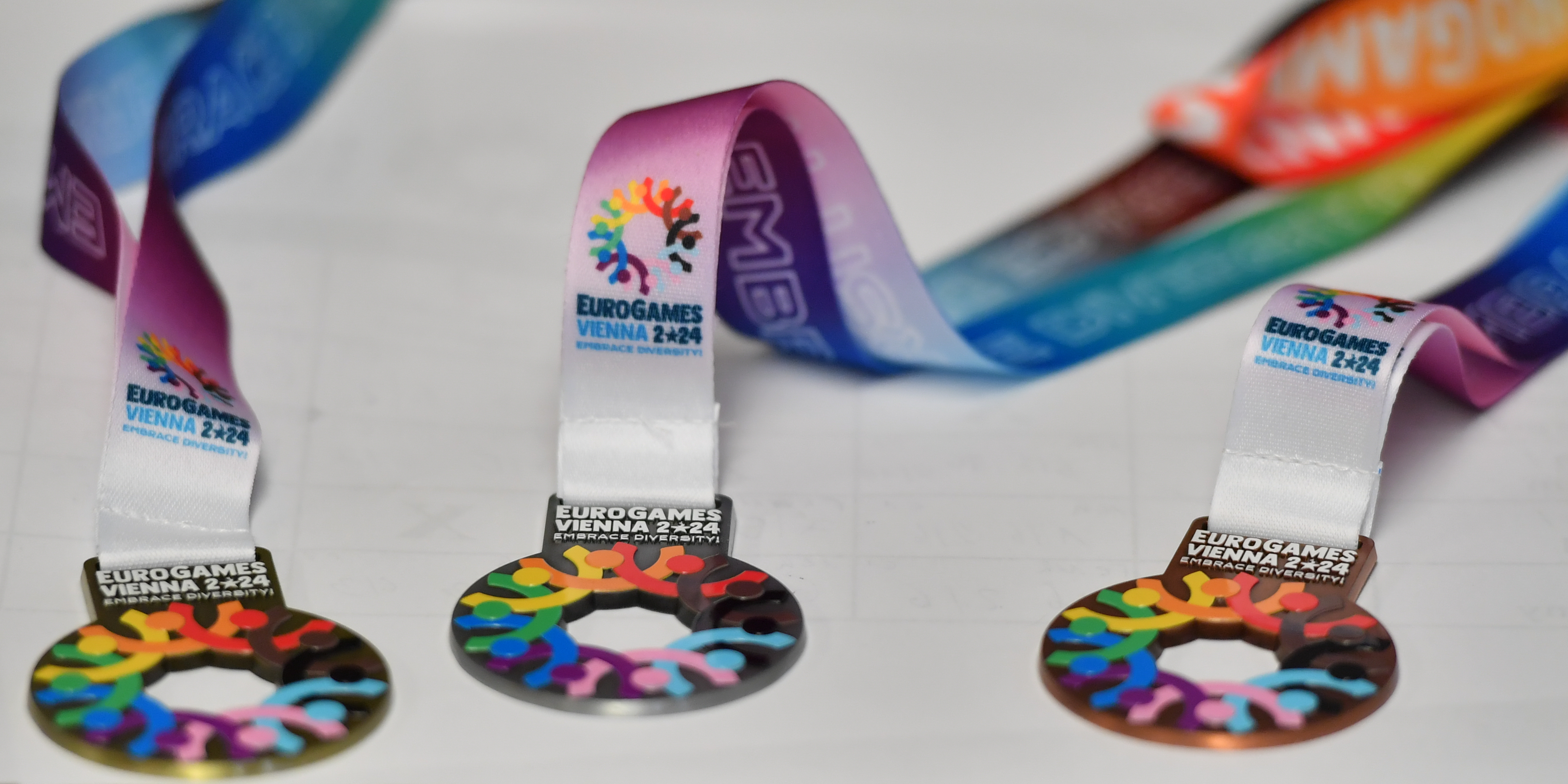
EuroGames 2024 medals set

== Achievements ==
The organizational team consisted of approximately 15 people, led by the co-presidents Maria Schinko and Gerhard Marchl, but the event's delivery was made possible with the dedication of hundreds of volunteers. Key goals of the organizing team were to attract FLINTA individuals (women, lesbians, intersex, non-binary, trans, and asexual people) and participants from Central and Eastern Europe to Vienna. Approximately one-third of participants were female-identified or non-binary, and more than 200 came from Poland, Hungary, the Czech Republic, Slovakia, and other countries in Central, Eastern, and Southeastern Europe. In total, around 4,000 athletes from across Europe and beyond participated. The largest national delegations came from Germany, the United Kingdom, and Austria. Details presented in Final report and per sports statistics document (pdf) linked below.

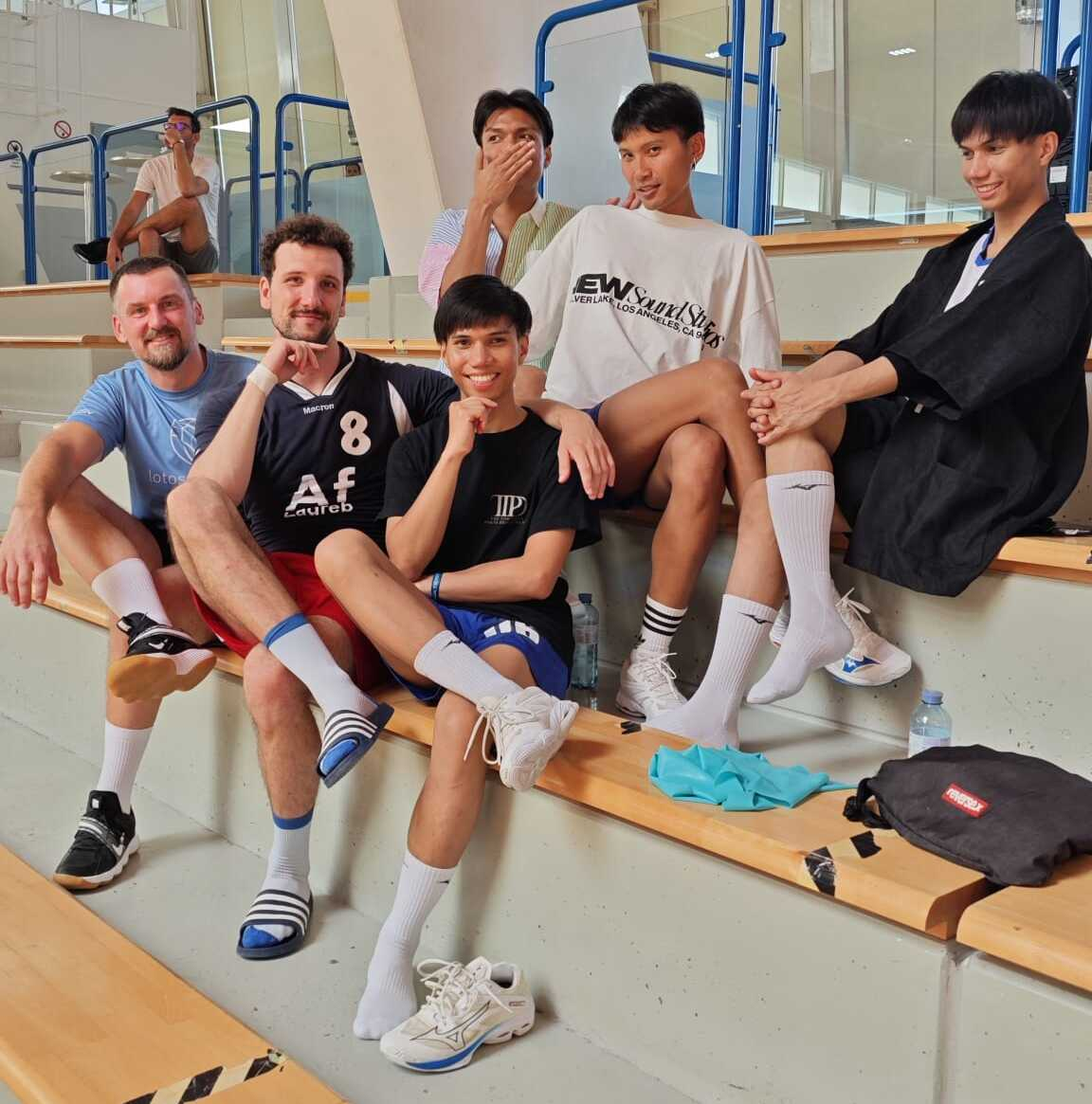
Volleyball players from different teams socializing during a break

== See also ==
- EuroGames
- Gay Games / Federation of Gay Games
- Principle 6 campaign
- World Outgames / Gay and Lesbian International Sport Association
- Vienna Pride
