= Hyrox =

Indoor fitness competition

- Founded: November 2017
- First season: 2018
- Owner: Upsolut Sports
- Director: Mintra Tilly
- Most recent champions: Dylan Scott (men); Alyssa McElhany (women); (2025–2026)
- Most titles: Hunter McIntyre x3 (men); Lauren Weeks x3 (women)
- Qualification: Hyrox Pro Event time, Hyrox Major, Hyrox Elite 15
- Sponsors: Puma (2019–current); Red Bull (2020–current); Centr (2023–current); Amazfit (2024–current)
- Website: hyrox.com

Hyrox is a fitness-racing group business which runs standardized fitness competitions that combine 8 kilometres (5.0 mi) of running with 8 functional workout stations.

Contestants alternate between running and functional exercises. It bills itself as "The World Series of Fitness Racing" and "A Sport for Everybody".

A Hyrox competition is made up of eight 1-kilometre (0.62 mi) runs each followed by one of eight different functional workout stations. The events are standardized across all locations, allowing athletes to compare results globally.

Hyrox was launched by Christian Toetzke and Moritz Fürste. The first Hyrox event was held in Hamburg, Germany, in April 2018.

== History ==
Originally called Curox, Hyrox was founded by Olympic field hockey champion Moritz Fürste and Christian Toetzke, and first introduced in Hamburg, Germany in 2017. With the idea of developing a program that would appeal to gym-goers and avid Strava users, Fürste and Toetzke designed a race of "eight 1km runs with a workout station in between each 1km – in no particular order." It would also motivate gym users to move past losing weight and checking their body status.

The first Hyrox event had 650 participants. According to Fürste, the original brief was "to create an event that is a €200,000 production that looks like a €2,000,000 production".

The competition has since expanded worldwide, with 24,000 people taking part in Hyrox events in London alone in 2023. In total, 65 races were held around the world in 2023, with 175,000 competitors taking part.

=== Hyrox affiliates ===
A network of Hyrox-affiliated gyms has been established, and gyms pay a yearly affiliation fee to become a Hyrox affiliate. There are three tiers of affiliation: Hyrox Performance Centers, Hyrox Training Clubs, and Hyrox Performance Academy. Hyrox365 is responsible for the training and education side of Hyrox. The number of Hyrox-affiliated gyms grew rapidly, and reached 5,000 by the end of 2024.

=== Sponsorship and prize money ===
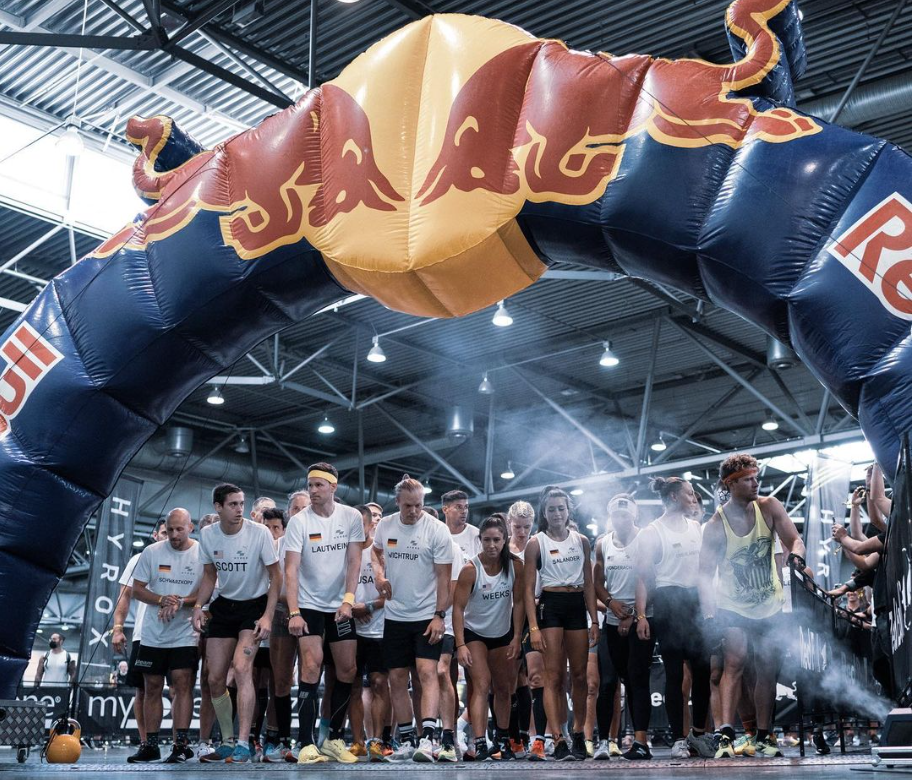
2021 Hyrox World Championships start line in Leipzig, Germany.

By season 3 of Hyrox (2020–2021) it had attracted investments from Infront Sports & Media Group and sponsorships by global brands Red Bull and Puma. Prize money for the elite event has grown year on year. Other major events have received prize payouts in addition to the World Championships. For the 2023–2024 Hyrox World Championship, the total prize purse was $150,000 split between the male and female elite fields, with the winner receiving $25,000.

In 2024, Hyrox announced a relay event with representatives from 20 different countries as captains, with the freedom to pick their teams from any athlete of that country. At the World Championships in Nice, France, the relay will take place as the final event with the winning team taking home $20,000 in prize money ($5,000 per athlete).

== Format ==
Hyrox combines running with functional exercise stations, where participants run 1 km (0.62 mi), followed by one functional exercise station, repeated eight times. Each race is hosted indoors in exhibition halls or convention centers. Occasional events have been hosted outdoors, including Miami in 2023. The world's first fully equipped outdoor HYROX Gym was built at Club La Santa in Lanzarote, Spain, in May 2024.

This race format remains consistent across the globe, enabling global leaderboards and a cumulative World Championships at the end of each race season. At the event's functional exercise stations, participants are required to complete the following:

- 1 kilometer of running into 1 kilometer of SkiErg
- 1 kilometer of running into 50 meters of sled push
- 1 kilometer of running into 50 meters of sled pull
- 1 kilometer of running into 80 meters of burpee broad jump
- 1 kilometer of running into 1 kilometer of rowing
- 1 kilometer of running into 200 meters of kettlebell farmer carry
- 1 kilometer of running into 100 meters of sandbag walking lunge
- 1 kilometer of running into 100 wall balls

All participants complete the running and stations. Station weights and repetitions can differ based on the division.

== Hyrox workouts ==
Athletes preparing for Hyrox competitions usually train either at home, in Hyrox-affiliated gyms or other functional fitness gyms such as CrossFit boxes that provide access to specialized equipment such as SkiErgs, RowErgs, Kettlebells, Sandbags, sleds, wall balls, and dumbbells. These pieces of equipment help simulate the strength, endurance, and conditioning challenges athletes face during the actual Hyrox race. Since the event combines functional movements with endurance running, training sessions often blend high-intensity cardio with strength-based exercises to build total-body performance.

A typical Hyrox-style workout begins with what's known as a "buy-in" exercise — a foundational movement or endurance component that sets the tone for the rest of the session. This is followed by three or four additional exercises, performed in multiple rounds to build stamina and test recovery under fatigue. The goal is to maintain consistent effort while managing heart rate and proper form throughout the workout.

Examples of Hyrox-style workouts include:

- Buy-in: 1000-meter row Then: 3 rounds of 10 wall balls, 10 kettlebell swings, and 20-meter sled pushes.
- Buy-in: 800-meter run Then: 4 rounds of 10 sandbag lunges, 10 burpee broad jumps, and 15-calorie SkiErg.
- Buy-in: 500-meter SkiErg Then: 3 rounds of 20 air squats, 10 push-ups, and a 100-meter farmer's carry.

These workouts not only mirror the physical demands of Hyrox but also help athletes develop mental toughness, pacing awareness, and efficient transitions between movements—key elements for achieving faster race times and stronger overall performance.

== Hyrox competitions ==
Many Hyrox competitions are held around the world every year, and no qualification is required for athletes to join these competitions. Competitors may compete as a single, or in doubles as a two-person team, or in a team relay. There are four divisions: women, women pro, men, and men pro. For doubles, there are doubles women, doubles men and doubles mixed.

Some of the larger weekend events are extended to two- or three-day affairs. The largest single-day event took place in Birmingham, UK, with 5,032 total finishers. The only event with more participants was the two-day event in London in 2022 that had 6,270 participants.

A number of important championships are held every year, including the European Championships and the North America Championships, but the most important one is the Hyrox World Championships.

=== World Championships ===
==== Elite qualification system ====
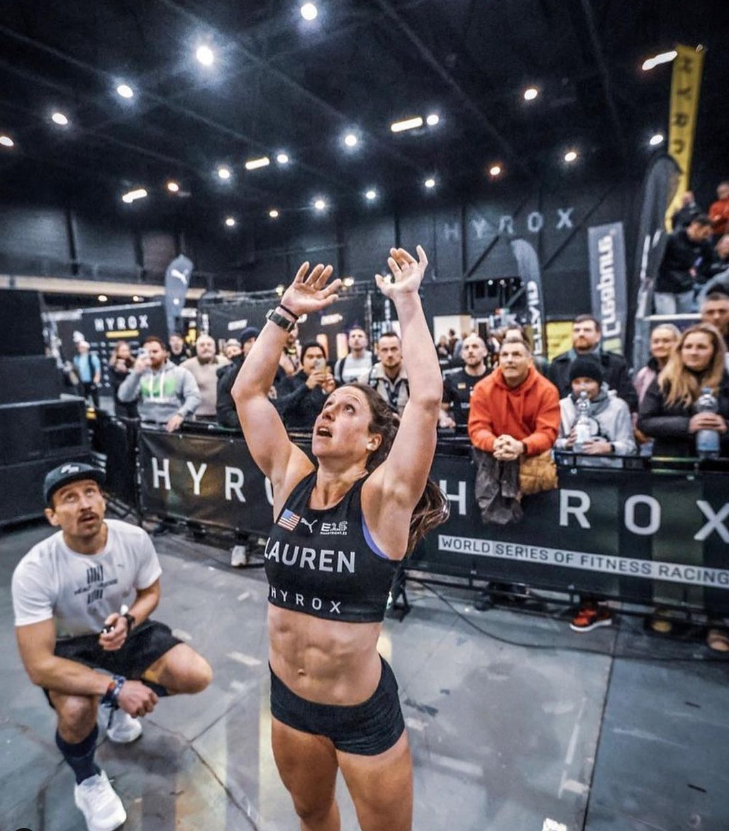
3x World Champion, Lauren Weeks, at the wall balls station at Hyrox EU Championships 2023

Competitors can qualify for the World Championships by becoming one of the Elite 15 in Individual Pro races. Those with the best time in the Pro division in a global leaderboard receive an invitation to the Elite race series such as the European Championships and the North America Championships. The podium finishers in these competitions qualify for the elite races in the World Championship.

The first Hyrox World Championships was held in Oberhausen, Germany, in 2019, with over 600 participants. For season 1 in 2019, the World Championships Elite race was determined solely by the fastest times of the season up to that point.

The season 2 races in 2020 were cancelled due to the COVID-19 pandemic. The official World Championships for that season had a condensed field that included the top 5 times of each gender plus one wild card invite of each gender. The wild card invites were from sport adjacent athletes and included Samantha Briggs (2013 CrossFit Games Champion) and Adam Klink (first male to squat 500-lbs and run a sub-5 minute mile in the same day).

For seasons 3, 4, and 5 (2021–2023), athletes qualified by placing top 3 at either the U.S. Championships or the European Championships. The remaining slots were filled in by the top times of the season.

In season 6 (2023–2024), in order to qualify for the World Championships, athletes needed to place top 3 in one of four "Major Championships" where roll-down slots would happen for athletes who already qualified but never passed 5th place. All remaining spots are filled in by two "Last Chance Qualifier" events, where the first one chronologically will have less available spots than the later one. Qualification for the four major events is based on automatic qualifiers from previous seasons (U.S. Champion, European Champion, Top 3 at World Championships) and the remaining spots are filled in based on time from Pro Division events.

The average finishing time for the men in the Pro division was 1 hour and 22 minutes in 2025.

In the 2024–2025 season, Hyrox introduced Elite 15 divisions for Men's and Women's Pro Doubles for the first time. Similar to the individual Elite 15 format, the top-performing doubles teams from the Pro division leaderboard, along with qualifiers from major championship events, were invited to compete in a final championship heat at the World Championships. Mixed Doubles did not feature an Elite 15 division in this season; champions were determined by overall fastest time.

== Champions by year ==
The World Champions of each season are listed here:

=== Pro/Elite men and women ===
World Champions
Season	Year	Location	Female champion	Female winning time (h:mm:ss)	Male champion	Male winning time (h:mm:ss)
1	2018–2019	Oberhausen, Germany	(Germany) Imke Salander	1:08:08 (WR)	(Germany) Lukas Storath	0:59:07
2	2019–2020*	Hamburg, Germany	(United States) Lauren Weeks	1:09:47	(United States) Hunter McIntyre	1:00:04
3	2021	Leipzig, Germany	(United States) Lauren Weeks (x2)	1:03:43 (WR)	(Germany) Tobias Lautwein	1:00:00
4	2021–2022	Las Vegas, USA	(United States) Kris Rugloski	1:07:21	(United States) Hunter McIntyre (x2)	0:58:05
5	2022–2023	Manchester, UK	(United States) Lauren Weeks (x3)	0:59:51	(United States) Hunter McIntyre (x3)	0:56:40
6	2023–2024	Nice, France	(United States) Megan Jacoby	0:59:59	(Austria) Alexander Roncevic	0:56:21
7	2024–2025	Chicago, USA	(Germany) Linda Meier	0:58:56	(Germany) Tim Wenisch	0:53:53
8	2025–2026	Stockholm, Sweden	(United States) Alyssa McElheny	0:56:59	(United States) Dylan Scott	0:53:47

• 2020 was run on Assault Fitness AirRunners due to COVID-19 restrictions

=== Pro/Elite doubles (men's, women's and mixed) ===
Season	Year	Location	Womens doubles champions	Womens doubles winning time (h:mm:ss)	Mens doubles champions	Mens doubles winning time (h:mm:ss)	Mixed doubles champions	Mixed doubles winning Time (h:mm:ss)
1	2018–2019	Oberhausen, Germany	(Germany) Manuela Staelberg (Germany) Marisa Staelberg	1:04:07	(Germany) Johannes Neusser (Germany) Martin Dambauer	0:56:15	(Germany) Julien Hagel (Germany) Claudia Wipfler	0:56:56
2	2019–2020*	No Doubles Race was held due to COVID-19 Restrictions						
3	2021	Leipzig, Germany	(Germany) Bente Pries (Germany) Agnes Schulz	1:04:19	(Germany) Christoph Uhl (Germany) Holger Körner	0:51:03	(Germany) Julien Hagel (x2) (Germany) Claudia Wipfler (x2)	0:57:46
4	2021–2022	Las Vegas, U.S.	(Republic of Ireland) Aileen McCann (Republic of Ireland) Tahlia Britton	1:01:25	(Germany) Clemens Scherbel (Germany) Christopher von Stelzer	0:51:26	(United States) Lauren Rantala (United States) Marc Howe	0:57:13
5	2022–2023	Manchester, UK	(Germany) Rebecca Naether (Switzerland) Mirjam Von Rohr	1:00:36	(United States) Taylor Haney (United States) Colin Stiefer	0:54:29	(Germany) Jacqueline Lippenmeyer (Germany) Florian Lippenmeyer	0:55:51
6	2023–2024	Nice, France	(United Kingdom) Kate Davey (United Kingdom) Zara Piergianni	0:57:59	(United Kingdom) Jake Dearden (United Kingdom) Marc Dean	0:52:34	(Germany) Fabien Eisenlauer (Germany) Jennifer Nikolaus	0:53:08
7	2024–2025**	Chicago, USA	(United States) Lauren Griffith (United States) Lauren Weeks	0:54:58	(Germany) Tim Wenisch (Germany) Jannik Czapla	0:50:24	(France) Mévéna Pingliez (France) Quentin Pingliez**	0:54:06
8	2025–2026	Stockholm, Sweden	(United States) Lauren Weeks (United States) Vivian Tafuto	0:53:31	(Austria) Alexander Roncevic (Germany) Tim Wenisch	0:48:57		

*2020 was canceled for doubles due to COVID-19 Restrictions

**The 2024–2025 season was the first to feature Elite 15 Men's and Women's Doubles races at the World Championships. Mixed Doubles did not feature an Elite 15 race; champions listed are the overall fastest team from the Age Group races.

U.S. and North American Championships
Season	Year	Location	Female champion	Female winning time (h:mm:ss)	Male champion	Male winning time (h:mm:ss)
3	2021	Chicago, U.S.	(United States) Lauren Weeks	1:05:18 (WR)	(United States) Hunter McIntyre	1:01:01
4	2022	Chicago, U.S.	(United States) Lauren Weeks	1:07:03	(United States) Ryan Kent	0:57:45
5	2023	Chicago, U.S.	(Sweden) Mikaela Norman	1:02:04	(United States) David Magida	0:59:11
6	2024	Washington, D.C., U.S.	(United States) Lauren Weeks	1:01:20	(United States) Dylan Scott	0:56:37
7*	2025	Washington, D.C., U.S.	(United States) Lauren Weeks	0:55:38*	(United States) Dylan Scott	0:53:42*
8	2026	Washington, D.C., U.S.	(United States) Lauren Weeks	56:27	(Canada) Cole Learn	53:37

*The North American Championships in 2025 was an Open division race and not Pro/Elite division like previous years.

The U.S. and North American Championships did not officially start until season 3. The male winner of the U.S./North American Championships has never gone on to win the World Championships title in the same year.

European Championships
Season	Year	Location	Female champion	Female winning time (h:mm:ss)	Male champion	Male winning time (h:mm:ss)
3	2021	Madrid, Spain	(Germany) Viola Oberlander	1:04:56	(Austria) Alexander Roncevic	0:58:50
4	2022	Maastricht, Netherlands	(Switzerland) Mirjam Von Rohr	1:04:20	(Germany) Tobias Lautwein	0:56:52
5	2023	Maastricht, Netherlands	(United States) Lauren Weeks	1:01:12	(Austria) Alexander Roncevic	0:57:26
6	2024	Vienna, Austria	(United States) Lauren Weeks	0:58:03 (WR)	(Austria) Alexander Roncevic	0:54:28
7*	2025	Vienna, Austria	(United Kingdom) Sophia Parvizi Wayne	57:36*	(Austria) Alexander Roncevic	0:53:28*
8	2026	London, UK	(England) Sinead Bent	58:04	(Netherlands) Hidde Weersma	52:42 (WR)

*The European Championships in 2025 was an Open division race and not Pro/Elite division like other years.

The European Championships did not officially start until season 3.

== World records ==
Prior to the start of the 2022–2023 season, the sled weights were adjusted to include the weight of the sled in an attempt to more readily standardize the courses throughout the world. This change effectively reduced the men's and women's push and pull sleds by about 10 kg each, which is reflected in the slew of record breaking times during that season.

=== Pro category world record progression ===
==== Female ====
Season	Year	Female WR holder	WR time	Location	Date	Days record stood (Total for athlete)
1	2019	(Germany) Imke Salander	1:08:08	Oberhausen, Germany	May 2019	200 days (200 days)
2	2019	(Germany) Elisabeth Sarah Kholti	1:05:33	Essen, Germany	November 16, 2019	587 days (587 days)
3	2021	(United States) Lauren Weeks	1:05:18	Chicago, U.S.	June 26, 2021	76 days (76 days)
3	2021	(United States) Lauren Weeks	1:03:43	Leipzig, Germany	September 10, 2021	365 days (443 days)
5	2022	(Germany) Linda Meier	1:03:29	Basel, Switzerland	September 11, 2022	41 days (41 days)
5	2022	(Germany) Linda Meier	1:02:23	Amsterdam, Netherlands	October 22, 2022	14 days (54 days)
5	2022	(United States) Megan Jacoby	1:01:56	Chicago, U.S.	November 5, 2022	21 days (21 days)
5	2022	(Sweden) Mikaela Norman	1:00:45	Hamburg, Germany	November 26, 2022	147 days (147 days)
5	2023	(United States) Megan Jacoby	0:58:58	Anaheim, U.S.	April 22, 2023	229 days (250 days)
6	2023	(United States) Megan Jacoby	0:58:52	Stockholm, Sweden	December 7, 2023	64 days (314 days)
6	2024	(United States) Lauren Weeks	0:58:03	Vienna, Austria	February 9, 2024	397 days (840 days)
7	2025	(United States) Lauren Weeks	0:56:23	Glasgow, United Kingdom	March 12, 2025	323 days (1,163 days)
8	2026	(Australia) Joanna Wietrzyk	0:56:03	Phoenix, USA	January 29, 2026	77 days (77 days)
8	2026	(Australia) Joanna Wietrzyk	0:54:26	Warsaw, Poland	April 16, 2026	Current WR

==== Male ====
Season	Year	Male WR holder	WR time	Location	Date	Days record stood (Total for athlete)
1	2018	(Germany) Lukas Storath	59:07	Stuttgart, Germany	November 2018	451 days (451 days)
2	2020	(United States) Hunter McIntyre	57:34	Chicago, U.S.	January 25, 2020	816 days (816 days)
4	2022	(Germany) Tobias Lautwein	56:52	Maastricht, Netherlands	March 26, 2022	14 days (14 days)
4	2022	(United States) Hunter McIntyre	55:09	Dallas, U.S.	April 9, 2022	343 days (1,159 days)
5	2023	(United States) Hunter McIntyre	54:07	Barcelona, Spain	March 18, 2023	264 days (1,423 days)
6	2023	(United States) Hunter McIntyre	53:22	Stockholm, Sweden	December 7, 2023	666 days (2,089 days)
8	2025	(Austria) Alexander Roncevic	53:15	Hamburg, Germany	October 3, 2025	168 days (168 days)
8	2026	(Netherlands) Hidde Weersma	52:42	London, UK	March 20, 2026	27 days (27 days)
8	2026	(Austria) Alexander Roncevic	51:59	Warsaw, Poland	April 16, 2026	Current WR

=== Current open category world records ===
==== Female ====
Year	Holder	Time	Location
2025	(United States) Lauren Weeks	00:55:38	Washington D.C, USA

==== Male ====
Year	Holder	Time	Location
2024	(Austria) Alexander Roncevic	00:50:38	Cologne, Germany

== 2026 Hyrox Beijing diarrhea incident ==
Controversy arose following an incident during the 2026 Hyrox Beijing race involving Women's World Record holder and Puma sponsored athlete Joanna Wietrzyk, who defecated on herself during the event. Wietrzyk had contracted food poisoning shortly before the race which caused her to have bowel incontinence, to which she felt no symptoms. At the fourth exercise station – burpee broad jumps – which Wietrzyk found especially challenging, she experienced a sudden onset of diarrhea. With her legs and arms visibly covered in diarrhea, she continued to compete in the event without intervention from officials, which raised concerns about exposure to biohazards due to her excrement contaminating the track and shared equipment. Competitors were disrupted by the incident, with runners behind her reportedly slipping in the fecal matter. Wietrzyk ultimately won the race.

Hyrox initially issued a statement acknowledging the issue and stated they were looking to improving safety in upcoming events; at the same time, the statement warned that anyone engaging in threats of violence towards athletes will be permanently banned from all future events. The statement was later deleted. After the incident went viral on social media, Hyrox co-founder Moritz Fürste apologised for Hyrox not reacting immediately during the race and that new rules and procedures were implemented to prevent similar situations in the future. Wietrzyk continued to draw criticism for not issuing an apology, instead issuing a now-deleted Instagram post stating "Go hard or go home ... a win is a win." Wietrzyk offered an apology five days after the incident on her Instagram page, following news of having her sponsorship line being dropped by Puma. She retroactively withdrew from the competition and forfeited her victory.
