= EuroGames =

LGBTQ multi-sporting event in Europe

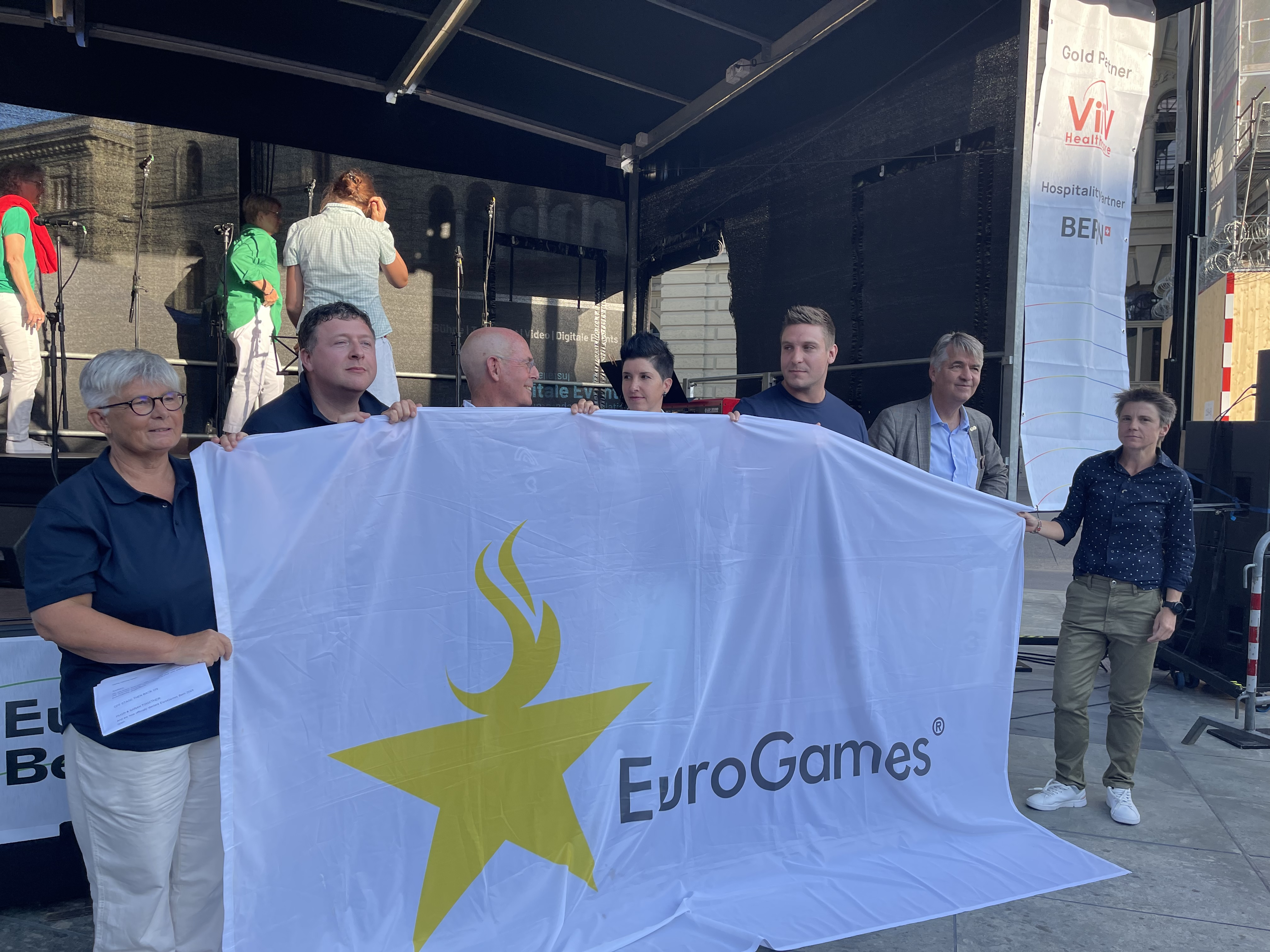
EuroGames flag presented at the opening ceremony in Bern in 2023

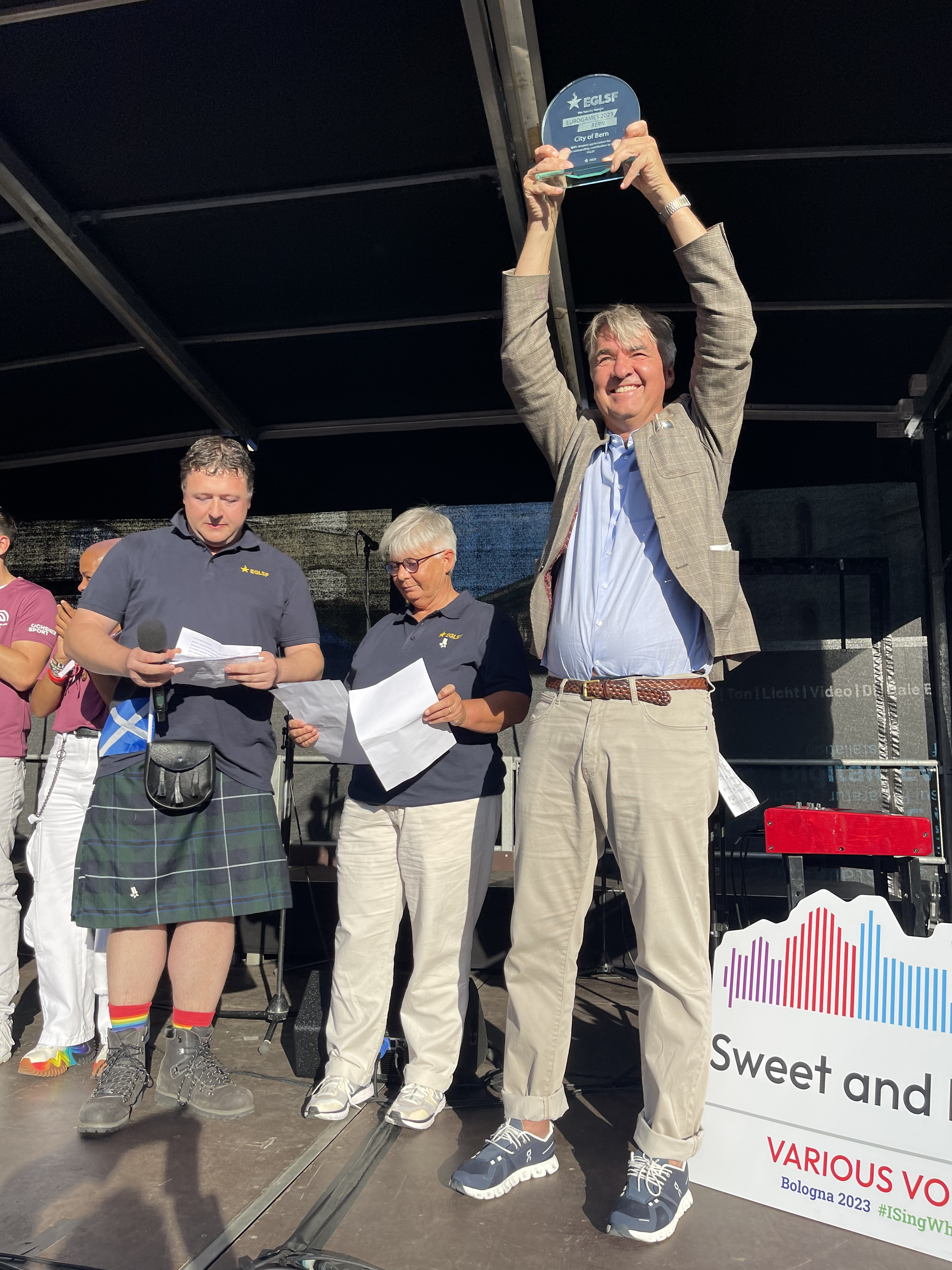
Co-presidents of EGLSF, Sarah Townsend, and Hugh Torrance with the mayor of Bern, Alec von Graffenried, brandishing the towns EuroGames 2023 trophee at the opening ceremony

The EuroGames are an LGBTQ multi-sport event in Europe, licensed by the EGLSF (European Gay and Lesbian Sport Federation) to a local city host each year and organised (most often) by one or more of the federation's member clubs. Similar to the Gay Games, EuroGames are a sports-for-all event, open for participation irrespective of sex, age, sexual identity or physical ability. Additionally it often included less prominent non-olympic sports and disciplines catering to interest of LGBTQ communities like same-sex ballroom dance, line dance, cheerleading, aerobics, bodybuilding as well synchronised/artistic swimming with male participants, which was historically forbidden.

In terms of scale EuroGames range from 1,5 to cca 4 thousand (or exceptionally more) participants primarily from the West and South of Europe but also elsewhere (often Asian and American diasporic communities), most often with extra outreach support subsidies for less privileged participants. The EuroGames is most often an extended weekend event with opening and closing ceremonies, some of the sport, social, policy and cultural activities also happening on the days before.

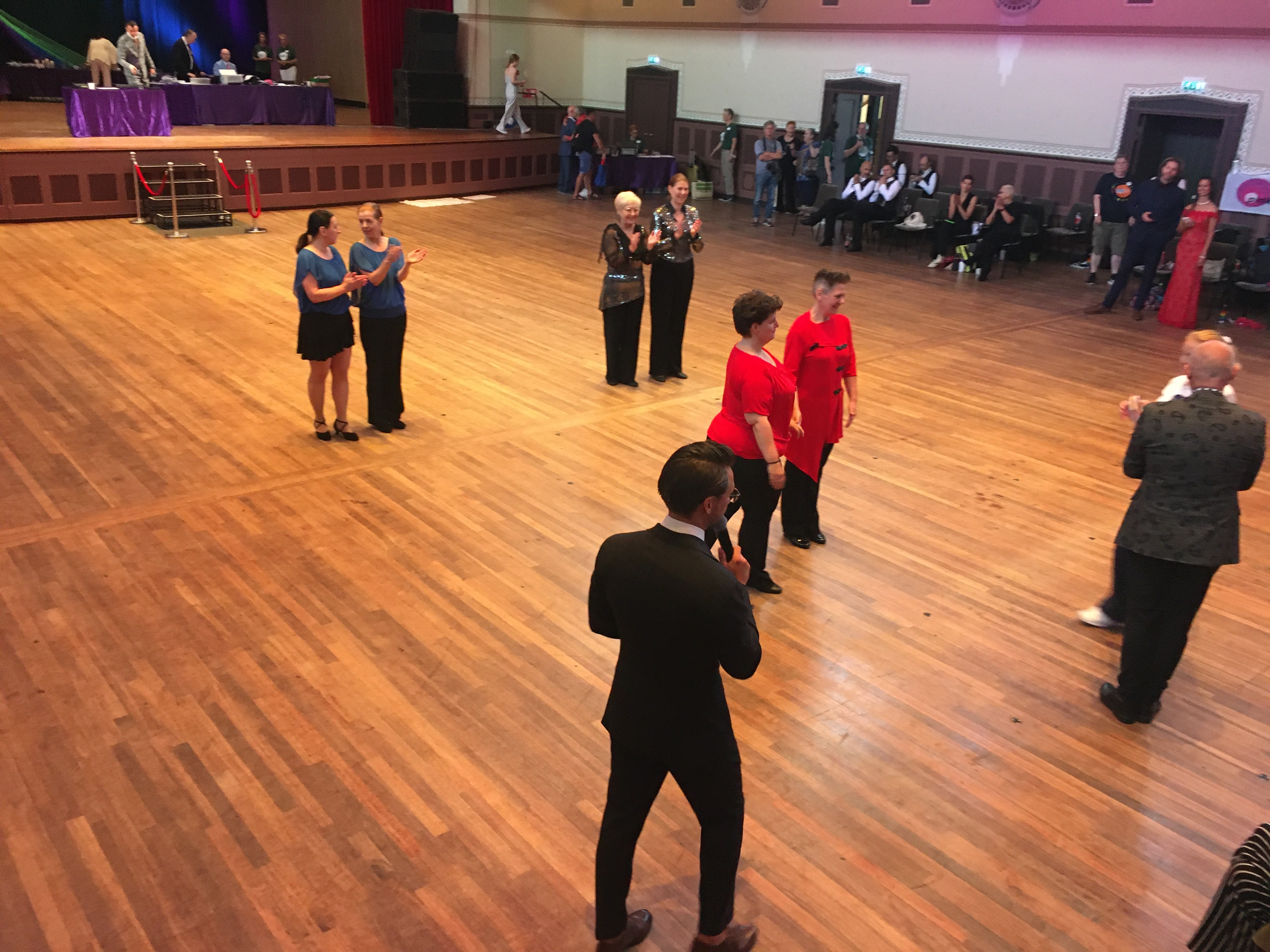
Ballroom dancing competition, EuroGames 2022 Nijmegen

== History ==
The official name of the EuroGames is the European Gay and Lesbian Multi-Sports Championships. It is a Dutch initiative inspired by GayGames, first organised in The Hague in 1992.

The EuroGames are a multi-day sporting event. They are organised annually in a European city, except in years when the global Gay Games take place. Since the advent of the World Outgames in 2006, this has been taken into account in determining whether or not a city is assigned to a particular year. In a year in which Gay Games and/or World Outgames take place, EuroGames generally do not take place.

Like the Gay Games as well as the World Outgames, the EuroGames are open to everyone regardless of gender, age, race, religion, sexual orientation or disability. When a competitive sport has not yet reached the maximum number of participants, participants from non-European countries are also admitted.

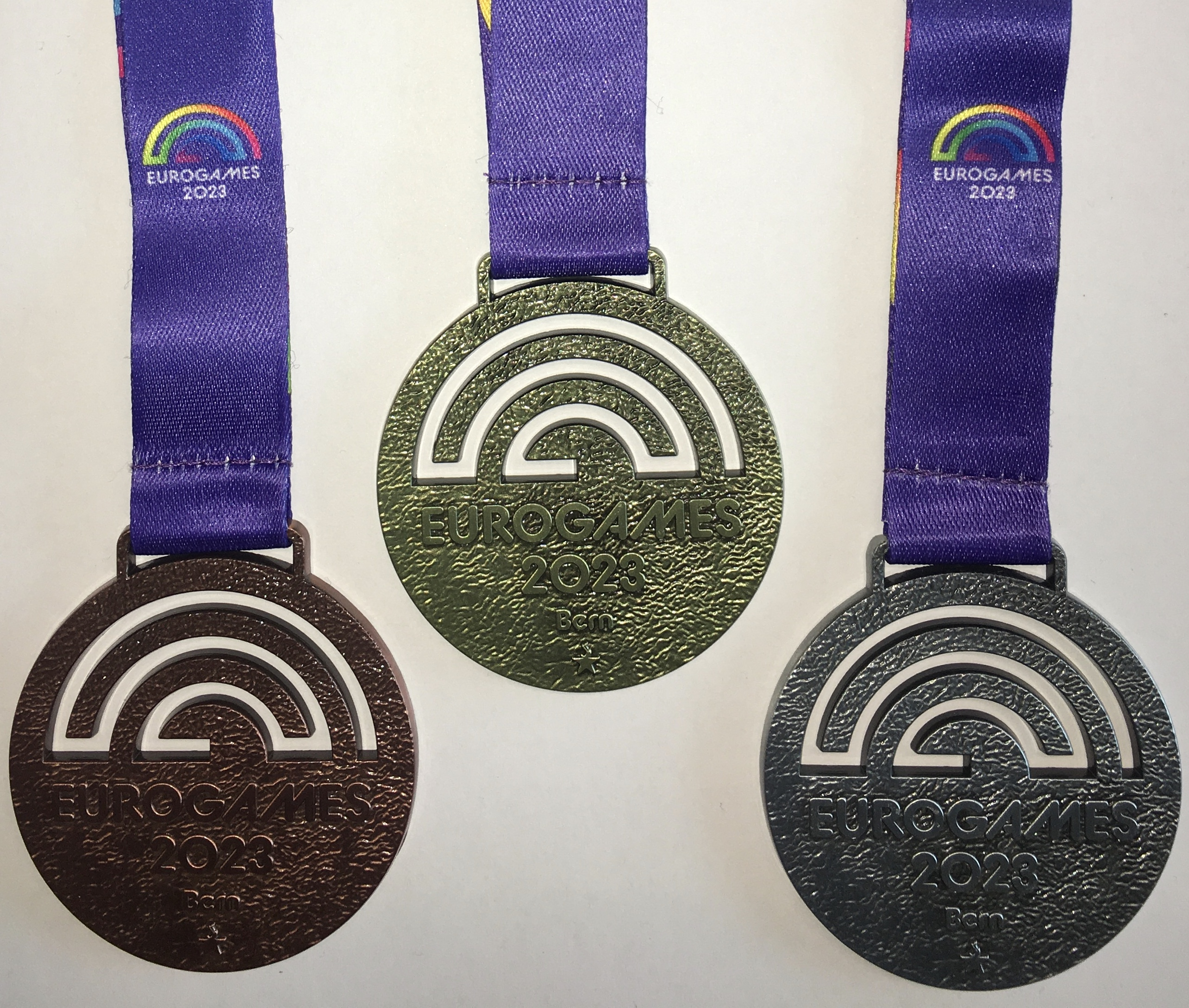
EuroGames 2023 medals

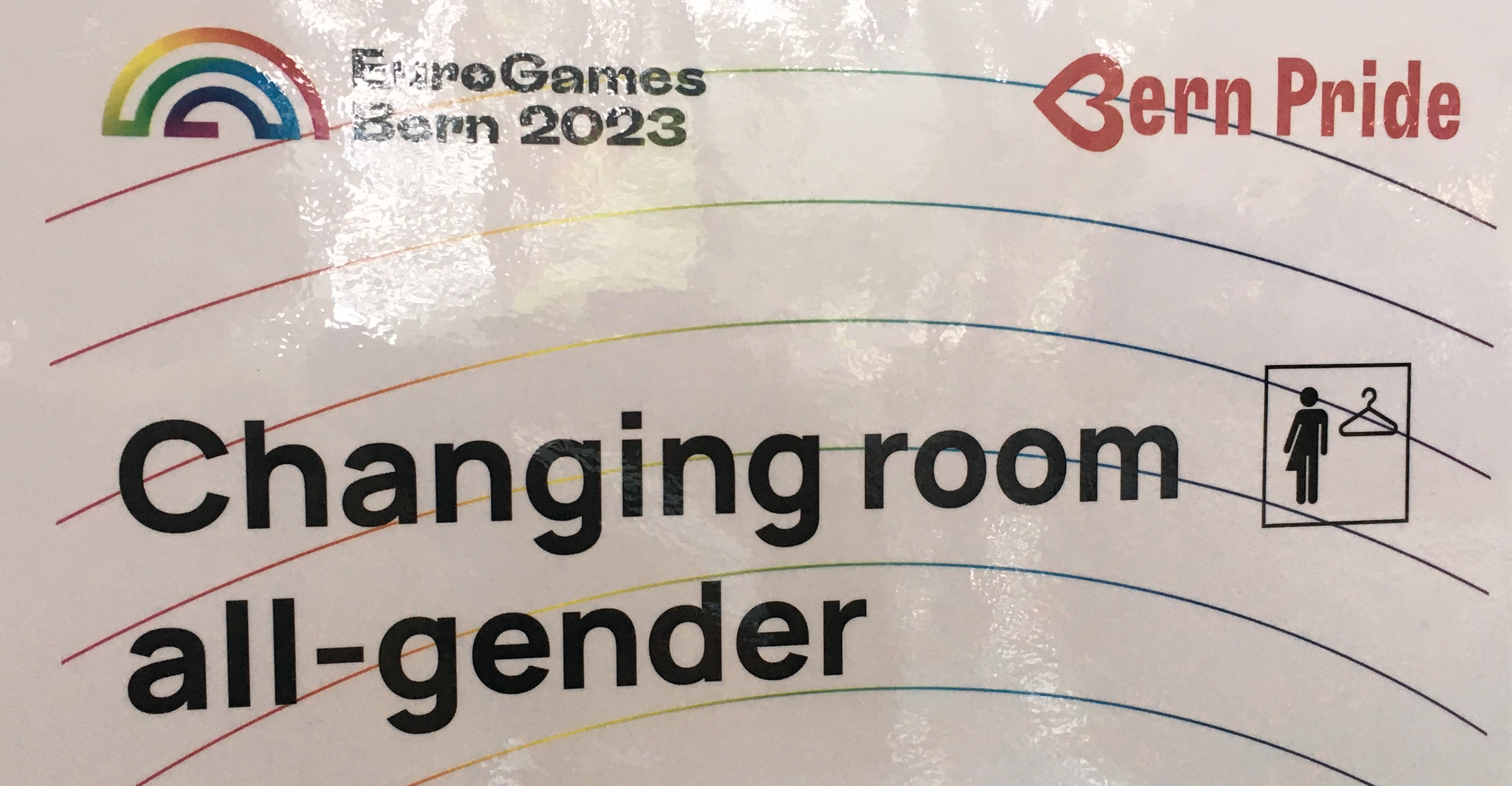
EuroGames 2023 - inclusive signs

Since 2001, the EuroGames have existed in two versions: the big EuroGames and the small EuroGames. It was planned that these small Games would have a maximum of 1,500 participants and seven sports and would last two days. The "small" EuroGames Utrecht 2005 were an exception to this. Almost 3,000 participants, nine competition sports and three competition days made Utrecht, as the smallest organizing city until then, have the largest 'small' Games compared to Hannover and Copenhagen in 2001 and 2003 respectively.

== Chronology ==
Edition	Year	Location	Country	Participants	Countries	Sports	Note	Other bidders
1	1992	The Hague	Netherlands	300	5	4		
2	1993	The Hague	Netherlands	540	8	6		
3	1995	Frankfurt	Germany	2,000	13			
4	1996	Berlin	Germany	3,247	18	17		
5	1997	Paris	France	2,000	18	17		Brussels, Zürich
–	1999	Manchester	United Kingdom	—N/a	—N/a	—N/a	Cancelled	Cologne
6	2000	Zürich	Switzerland	4,500		19		Hamburg
7	2001	Hanover	Germany	1,500		7	Small EuroGames	
8	2003	Copenhagen	Denmark	2,200		7	Small EuroGames	
9	2004	Munich	Germany	5,050	38	27		Vienna
10	2005	Utrecht	Netherlands	2,855	44	9	Small EuroGames	
11	2007	Antwerp	Belgium	3,650	38	11+1	Small EuroGames	
12	2008	Barcelona	Spain	>5,000	40	25		
13	2011	Rotterdam	Netherlands	>3,000		26		
14	2012	Budapest	Hungary					
15	2015	Stockholm	Sweden	4,465	71	28	Big EuroGames	
16	2016	Helsinki	Finland	1,400	40	14	EuroGames	
17	2019	Rome	Italy					
–	2020	Düsseldorf	Germany	—N/a	—N/a	—N/a	Cancelled	
18	2021	Copenhagen/Malmö	Denmark/Sweden	2,000		22		
19	2022	Nijmegen	Netherlands	>2,000		17		
20	2023	Bern	Switzerland	>2,000	75	20		
21	2024	Vienna	Austria	3988		31		
22	2025	Lyon	France	5500				
23	2027	Cardiff	United Kingdom					Munich

=== Bern 2023 ===
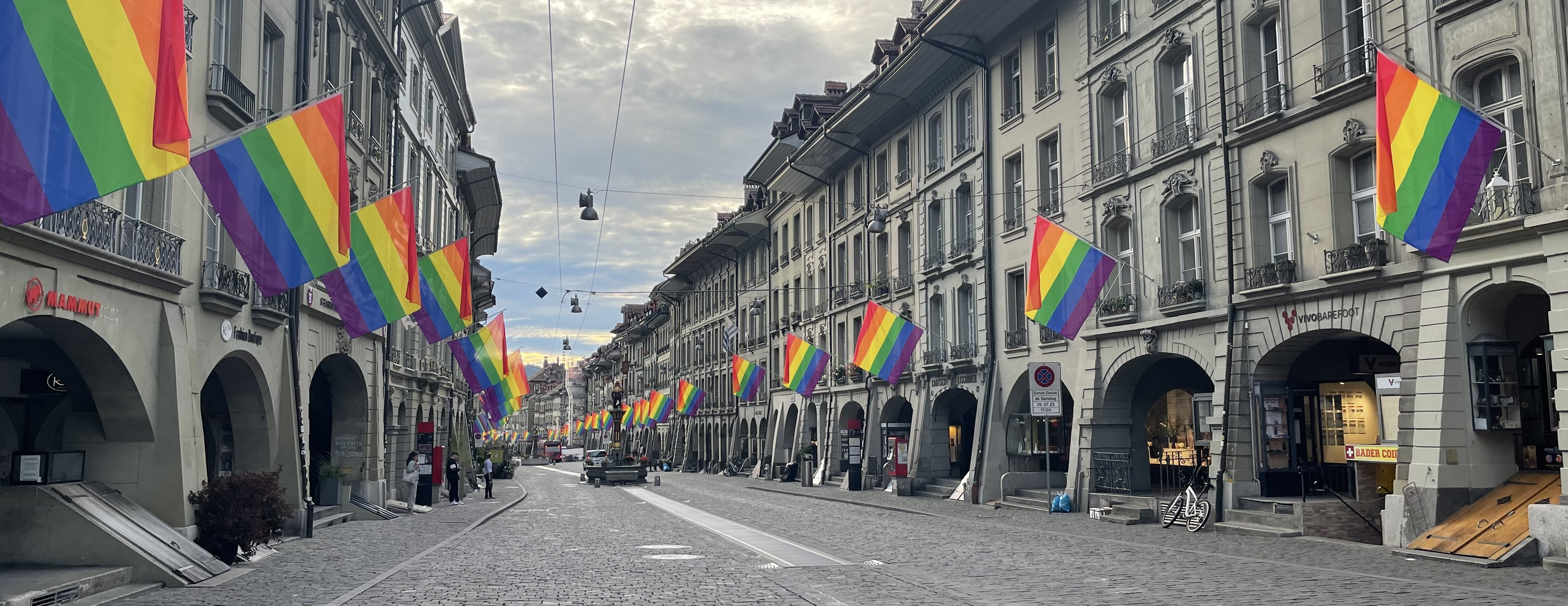
250 LGBTQ flags in Bern center during EuroGames & Pride

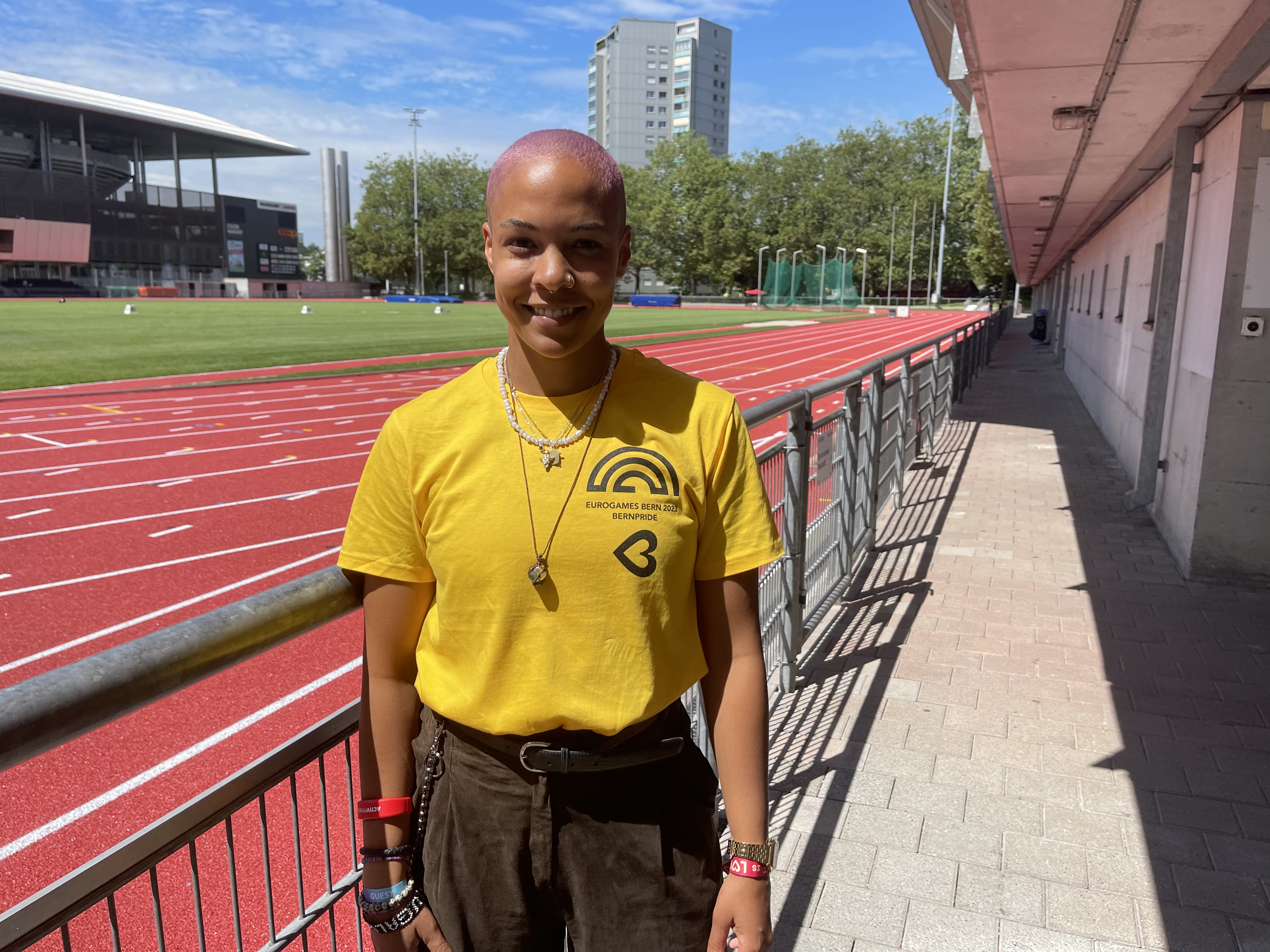
Jasmine Imbogen, co-president of EuroGames 2023 at the track &field

The 2023 EuroGames took place in Bern, Switzerland from 26 to 29 July 2023, with 20 sporting disciplines and over 2,000 athletes of various sexual orientations and gender identities participated in the event.

The sporting event included also demonstration sports like quidditch and local recreational hiking. Classic disciplines included tennis and bowling, but also other newer disciplines such as street workout, the Hyrox challenge and many other activities were scheduled.

For the occasion The city of Bern has had to deactivate its Twitter comment function following homophobic comments, notably from the Swiss Young SVP party. The youth branch of the Green Liberal Party of Switzerland has indicated that they are considering filing a complaint.

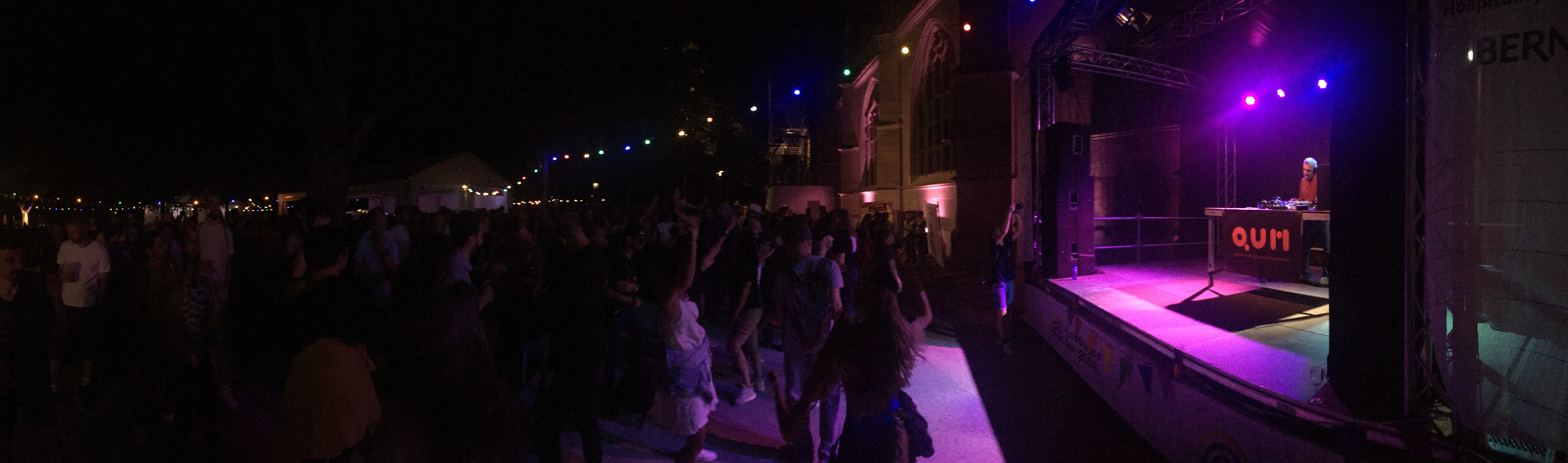
Village at night (Q.U.M. stage)

Jasmine Imboden and Greg Zwygart were co-presidents of 2023 EuroGames association. According to Greg Zwygart, the EuroGames is an inclusive sport event, also for heterosexual athletes. The event includes trans and intersex people even though these categories of people are not present in some sport disciplines.

EuroGames 2023 hosting impacted Bern Pride to have a village with multi-day and multi-venue programs mostly with local talent and few guests.

=== Vienna 2024 ===
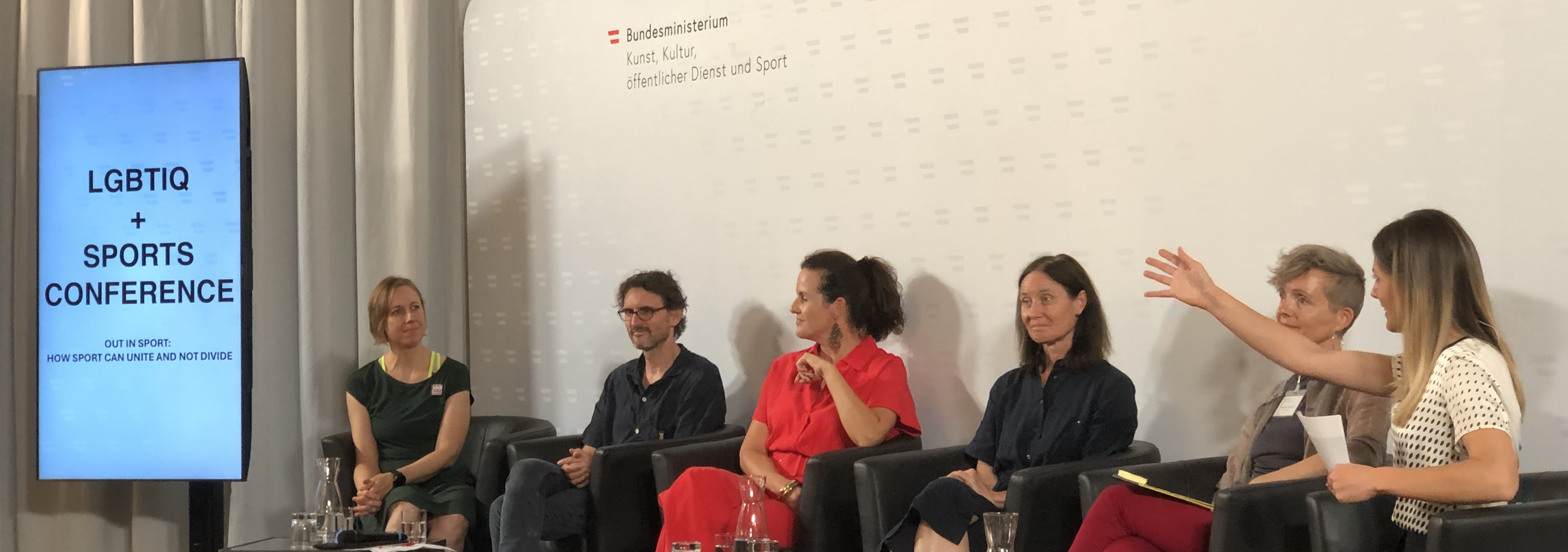
“Out in Sport” conference pannel

EuroGames Vienna 2024 had its kick-off event as a part of Vienna Pride programs on June 9, 2023 at the Vienna City Hall.

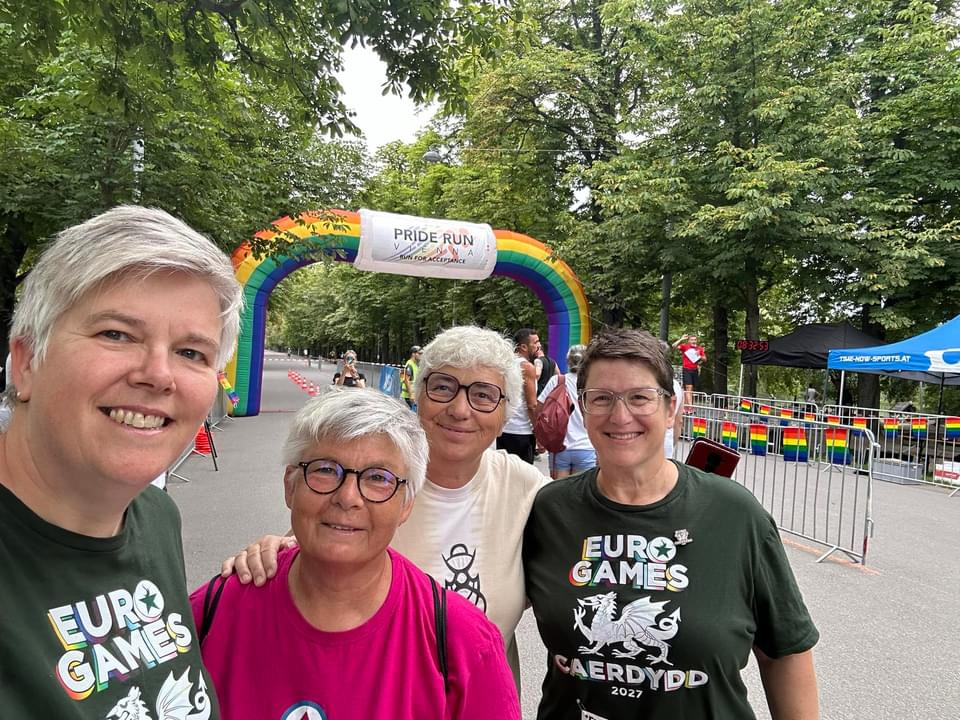
EuroGames 2027 Cardiff promotersat Pride Run EuroGames Vienna 2024

The multi-sport championship took place from July 17 to 20, 2024, and included 4,000 participants from 90 countries, competing in 32 different disciplines. The City of Vienna, supported EuroGames Vienna 2024 extensively with a subsidy of 150,000 euros, in addition to the provision of numerous sports venues and infrastructure. The program included an opening ceremony, a closing ceremony and a five-day program at EuroGames village. A financial support program was set up to enable the participation of over 100 people from countries in Eastern and South-Eastern Europe where the LGBTQ community is still discriminated against. On the EuroGames opening day sports policy conference named “Out in Sport - How Sport can Unite and not Divide” included many prominent Austrian and few international speakers and was broadcast by national TV.

=== Lyon 2025 ===
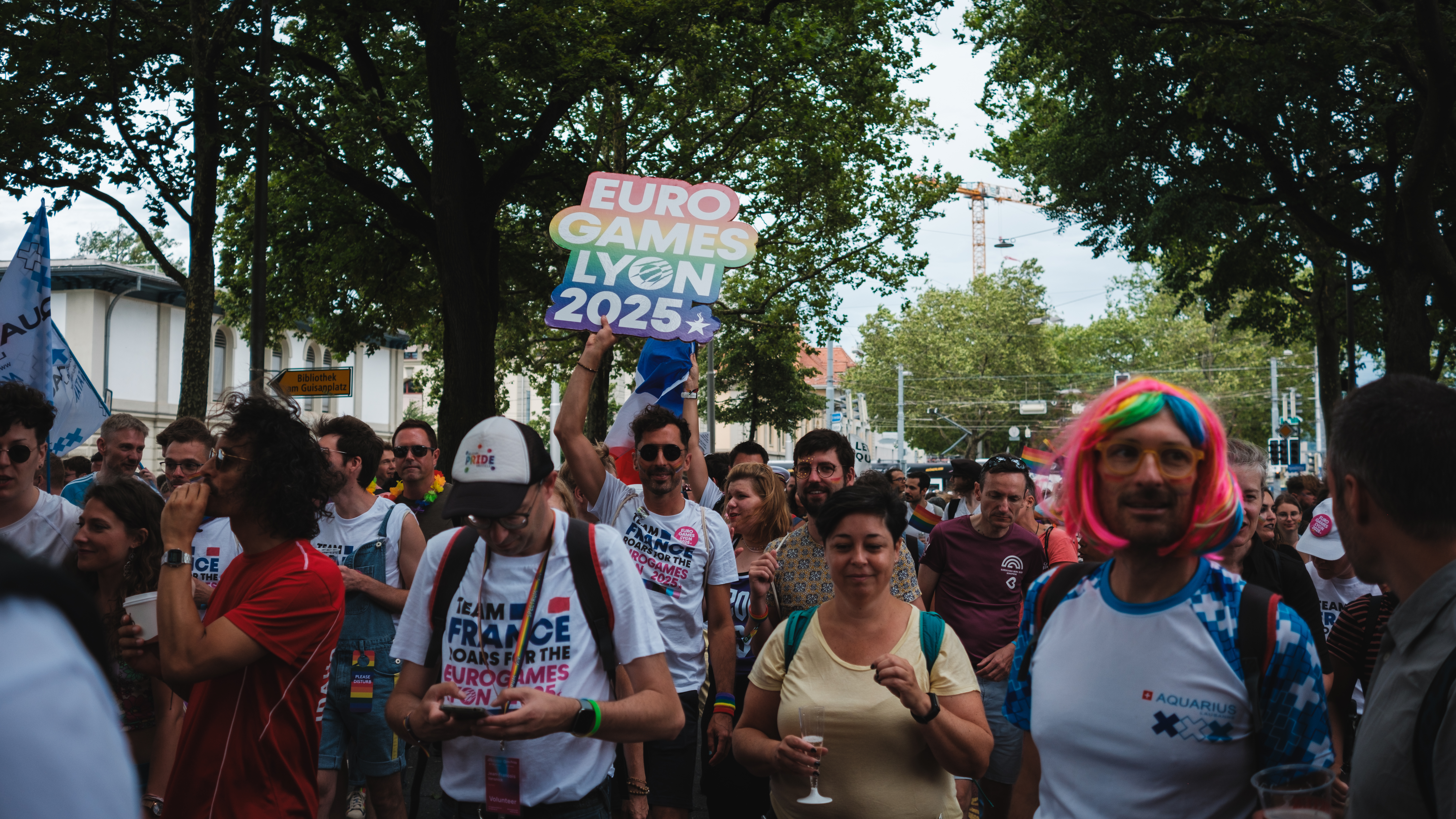
EuroGames Lyon 2025 promo banner at Bern Pride 2023

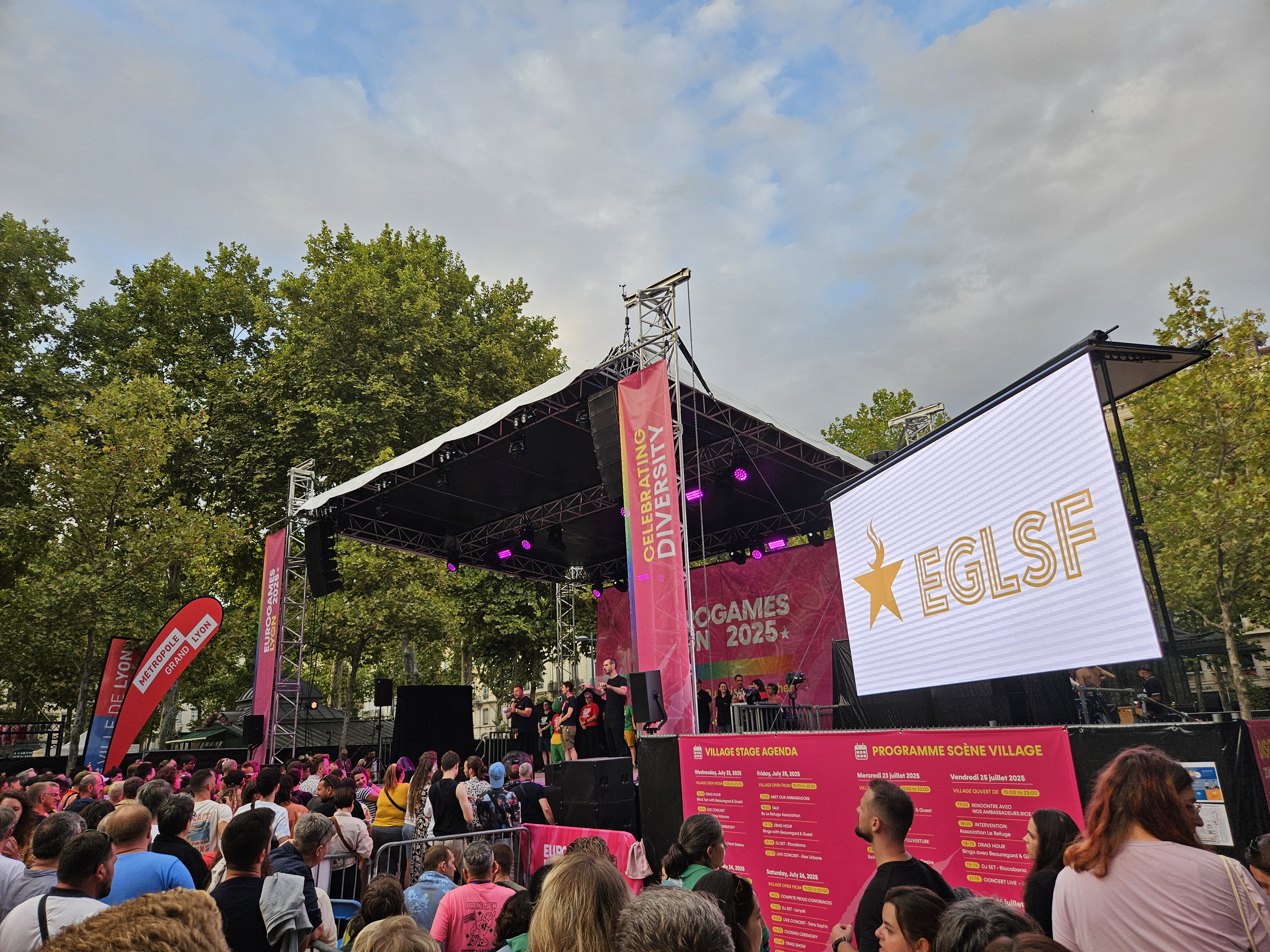
EGLSF and the Region of LYON promoted at EuroGames 2025 closing ceremony

Julie Nublat-Faure, the deputy mayor of Lyon in charge of sports, announced on Twitter, that the 2025 EuroGames would be held in Lyon from 23 to 26 July 2025. This is the first time the city hosts a European sports competition dedicated to the LGBTQ community, with a plan to bring together 4,000 athletes from over 40 countries in Europe and around the world to participate in over thirty sporting disciplines and cultural program, including tennis, football, rugby, synchronised swimming, pétanque, sailing, dance and choral singing, with the support of fifteen clubs affiliated to the OSL. The LGBT+ Sports Federation also pointed out that this event offers the opportunity "to exchange ideas and raise awareness among participants and spectators around themes such as LBGT+ handisport, the fight against serophobia, and notions of gender and sexual orientation".

== See also ==
- Europride
- Gay Games / Federation of Gay Games
- Principle 6 campaign
- World Outgames / Gay and Lesbian International Sport Association
- WorldPride
