= Ruputer =

Early smartwatch

The Ruputer is a wristwatch computer developed in 1998 by Seiko Instruments, a subsidiary of the Seiko Group. It was introduced on 10 June 1998. In the US, it was later marketed as the onHand PC by Matsucom.

The Ruputer has a 16-bit, 3.6 MHz processor and 2 MB of non-volatile storage memory and 128 KB of RAM. Its display is a 102×64 pixel monochrome LCD. Its main forms of input are a tiny 8-direction joystick and 6 function buttons. It also has a serial interface and an IR port for communicating with other devices. The main body of the device (separate from the strap) is roughly 2 inches wide, 1 1/8 inches across, and 5/8 of an inch deep. It is powered by two high-powered watch batteries, which supply the device enough energy for approximately 30 hours of use. Under normal conditions, the watch goes into standby mode down when not in use in order to extend its battery life. The device was distributed with a software development kit which allows for creation of new software written in the programming language C.

== onHand PC ==
The successor to the Ruputer is the onHand PC. The onHand PC was available in two color styles, clear & black, and a single format. While the Ruputer was available with either 512 KB of storage (original Ruputer), 2 MB (Ruputer PRO), or 4 MB of flash memory (Ruputer PRO4), the onHand PC came only in a single version with 2 MB of storage. The operating system is known as W-PS-DOS version 1.16. The device features both an icon-based GUI and a text-based user interface. There is 128 KB of RAM, with an additional 128 KB of ROM.

On the device, data can be entered by two methods: The first method is by using the joystick mounted to the front of the watch itself (a method that has been considered clumsy). The second method is by synchronizing data from a full-sized PC using the included software. A program called HandySurf also allows synchronizing internet content (such as Yahoo! News Headlines).

Communication with other devices is either through a 38,400-bit/s serial port dock, or through the 9,600 infrared link, the transmitter of which is mounted to the upper middle of the watch. It is possible to link two onHands via this infrared link to play various two-player games.

The watch uses two lithium CR2025 button cells for power, which can be accessed from the back of the device. The batteries give the user an average 3 months of usage before battery replacement. Many users have found that the CR2032 cells fit, which give the device a longer run time. The device's screen is a 102x64 STN 4-greyscale LCD which uses a timed backlight to save power.

The device weighs about 52 grams (1.8 ounces), similar that of a large electronic standard watch. Considering the type of system there is a fair amount of software available, although some of the programs written for the Ruputer are either entirely in Kanji script or will not run due to the increased speed of the onHand's processor.

One developer has made a prototype for a docking station for the watch that includes a screen illuminator and a half-keyboard. This is not a commercial product, but instructions are available as to how to create such a device.

The onHand PC was discontinued by Matsucom on April 7, 2006.

== Response ==
The Ruputer and onHand PC failed to achieve widespread success, for a number of reasons. First, their screen is too small to display more than a handful of text, making it awkward to view data. Second, their joystick input requires entering text in a process similar to that of entering one's initials in an arcade game high-score list. Finally, they run through their non-rechargeable batteries more swiftly than is convenient for a device meant to be worn as a timepiece, although it was later found that the slightly larger CR2032 battery can be used which gives substantially better battery life.

The main competitor for the onHand PC was the Fossil Wrist PDA, a wristwatch-sized PDA. The device runs Palm OS 4.1., and like other Palm OS devices, has a virtual keyboard and touch-sensitive screen with handwriting recognition, giving the Wrist PDA an advantage over the joystick input on the onHand PC. The Wrist PDA features 8 MB of memory, four times the memory in the onHand, although a major disadvantage of the Fossil device was volatile memory - if the battery died, data was lost. The Ruputer/onHand uses non-volatile storage, which is not battery-dependent, so data is retained even through battery death.
