= Runner's diarrhea =

Loose or liquid bowel movements while running

- Other names: Runner's colitis, runner's trots
- Specialty: Sports medicine, Gastroenterology
- Symptoms: Urgent need for bowel movement during or after running
- Causes: Ischemia, mechanical trauma, diet
- Treatment: Rest, fluid and electrolyte replacement

Runner's diarrhea, also known as runner's colitis, or runner's trots is a condition that often affects distance runners characterized by an urgent need for a bowel movement mid-run.

== Causes ==
The causes of runner's diarrhea remain under debate, although several theories include ischemia and mechanical trauma. The reduced incidence of diarrhea in cyclists would indicate the latter. Diet is often cited as a common cause of diarrhea in distance runners.

== Treatment ==
Runner's diarrhea will normally clear up by itself from several hours to two days after running. As with all forms of diarrhea, replacement of fluids and electrolytes is advisable. Methods to prevent runner's diarrhea will vary between individuals, although it is advisable to consider examining the pre-running diet to determine potential trigger foods.

== Notable cases ==
- At the 1998 London Marathon, winner Catherina McKiernan suffered from recurrent diarrhea during the race.
- At the 2005 London Marathon, winner Paula Radcliffe, in desperate need for a toilet break during the race, stopped by the road in full view of the crowd and live TV cameras and defecated. She later blamed a surfeit of pasta and grilled salmon from the previous night for the incident.
- At the 2008 Göteborgsvarvet half marathon, Mikael Ekvall finished the race in 21st place, despite being stained with his own excrement. When a reporter asked him if he had ever considered stopping to clean off, he explained: "No, I'd lose time. […] If you quit once, it's easy to do it again and again and again. It becomes a habit."
- At the 2016 Summer Olympics – Men's 50 kilometres walk, Yohann Diniz led the race, but due to gastrointestinal problems, he fainted multiple times mid race. He was able to recover and finish in 8th place, six minutes behind the winner Matej Tóth, but he was disqualified immediately after finishing the race for drinking outside of designated hydration stations.
- At the 2019 Perm International Marathon, Alexander Novikov finished first despite suffering from a bout of diarrhea, which left his clothes sodden.
- At the 2021 California International Marathon, Addi Zerrenner soiled herself three times.
- At the 2024 Boston Marathon, Davis Clarke finished in 2 hours and 56 minutes, soiling his shorts toward the end of the race.
- At the 2024 T100 World Championship, winner Taylor Knibb said to a camera operator, "I just shit myself. So can you not get my ass?"
- At the 2026 Comrades Marathon, winner George Kusche finished with feces on his legs.

== See also ==
- 2026 Hyrox Beijing diarrhea incident
