= Joanna Wietrzyk =

Australian athlete (born 2002)

Personal information
- Nationality: Australian
- Born: 7 June 2002 (age 24) Melbourne, Victoria, Australia
- Height: 180 cm (5 ft 11 in)

Sport
- Sport: Hyrox, hybrid racing
- Coached by: Chris Bayens
- Updated on September 17, 2026

Joanna Wietrzyk (/ˈwɛ.trɪk/, born 7 June 2002) is an Australian professional athlete and fitness coach. She is the current women's solo professional Hyrox world record holder and was the first Australian woman to qualify for the sport's elite competitive tier, the Elite 15 Series.

Wietrzyk became the subject of international media attention in September 2026 after she suffered from faecal incontinence during a race in Beijing, China, and continued to participate, which led to global rule changes within the sport.

== Career ==
Wietrzyk has a background in CrossFit, athletics, and bodybuilding, and was a national-level tennis and netball player before beginning endurance racing. She discovered Hyrox while working as an F45 Training coach. She became the first Australian female athlete to qualify for the sport's elite competitive tier, the Elite 15 Series.

In 2024, she won her first Hyrox Major title in Hong Kong with a time of 59:58. In a January 2026 Hyrox race in Phoenix, Arizona, US, she set a world record of 56:03. She beat her own record at a 2026 Hyrox race in Warsaw, Poland, setting a world record with a time of 54:25.

On 12 September 2026, Wietrzyk competed in the Hyrox Beijing event in China. Wietrzyk had contracted food poisoning shortly before the race which caused her to have bowel incontinence. During the race, she experienced a sudden onset of diarrhea. With her body covered in diarrhea, she continued to compete in the event. Competitors were disrupted by the incident, with runners behind her reportedly slipping in the fecal matter. Wietrzyk won the race. Wietrzyk drew criticism for not issuing an apology, instead issuing a now-deleted Instagram post stating "Go hard or go home ... a win is a win." Following backlash from the event, Wietrzyk chose to "retroactively withdraw" from the race and forfeit her victory. She was a brand representative for Puma, but after this incident the sportswear company removed her retail line. Wietrzyk offered an apology five days after the incident on her Instagram page. The event led to global rule changes within Hyrox.
