= Centr LLC =

American fitness company

- Industry: Fitness & Wellness
- Predecessor: Inspire Fitness
- Founder: Chris Hemsworth (Centr); Jeff Laborde (Inspire Fitness)
- Headquarters: Norco, California
- Parent: HighPost Capital
- Website: centr.com

Centr LLC is a fitness and wellness company founded by actor Chris Hemsworth in 2019. Originally launched as a subscription-based app providing personalized programs in fitness, nutrition, and mindfulness, Centr expanded into fitness equipment after its acquisition by HighPost Capital in 2022 and subsequent merger with Inspire Fitness. The brand now develops health and fitness products, including home gym equipment.

== History ==
Centr was launched in February 2019 as a digital health and fitness platform offering advice from Hemsworth's team of trainers, chefs, and other experts. The app offered guided workouts, meal planning, and mindfulness content.

In March 2022, Centr was acquired by HighPost Capital, a private equity firm co-founded by Mark Bezos. At the same time, HighPost also acquired Inspire Fitness, a manufacturer of home gym equipment. The two companies were merged, expanding Centr's business model from digital-only services to include branded fitness equipment.

In 2023, Centr became the official equipment partner of Hyrox, an international fitness race that combines endurance and functional strength events. Through this partnership, Centr and Inspire Fitness provide training equipment.
