= Lauren Weeks =

American athlete

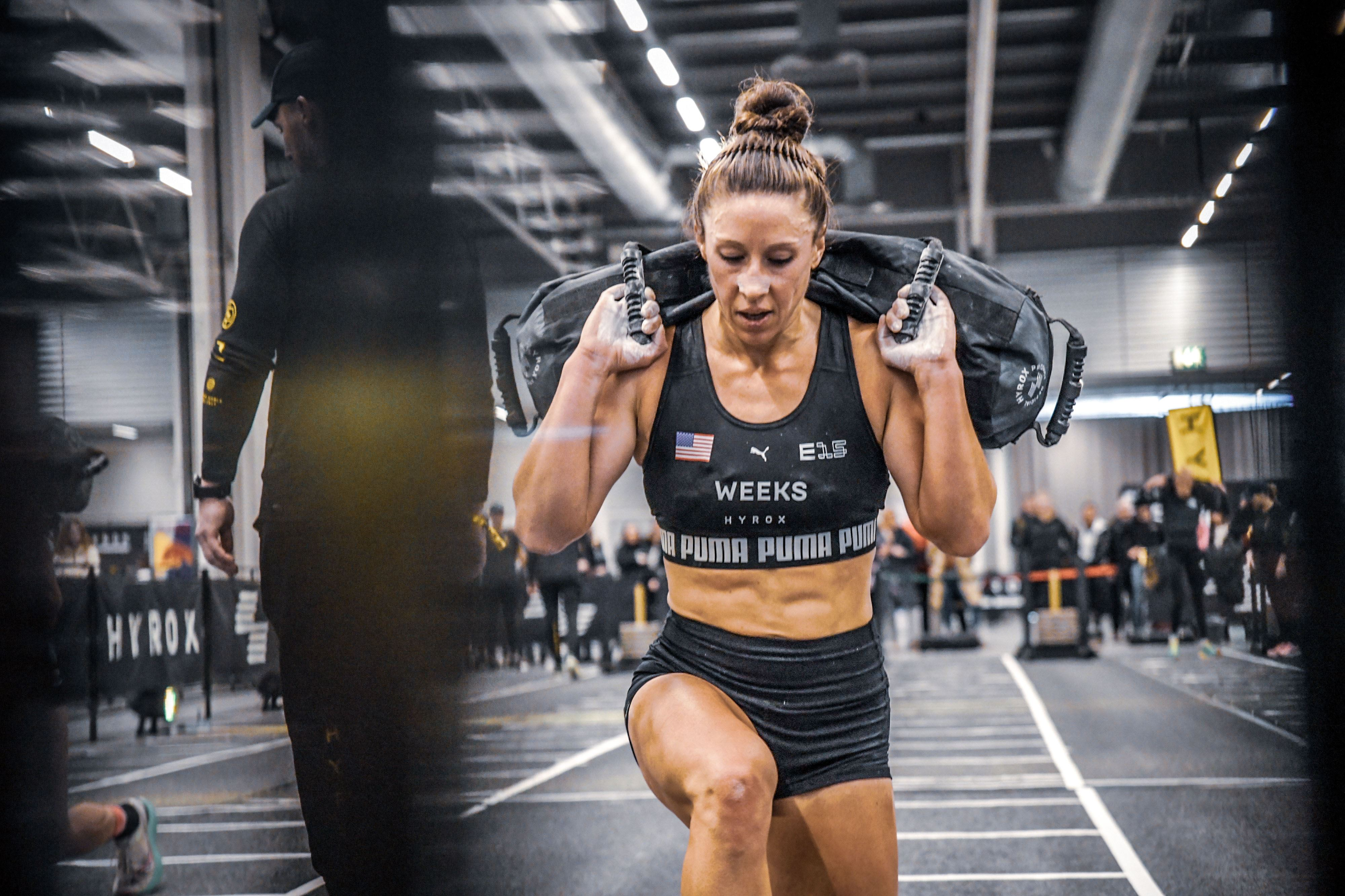
- Weeks at Stockholm Major HYROX in 2023

Personal information
- Born: 1989 or 1990 (age 35–36)

Sport
- Country: United States
- Sport: Hyrox

Lauren Weeks is an American Hyrox athlete. She is a three-time world champion in Hyrox.

== Career ==
Prior to competing in Hyrox, Weeks competed in CrossFit. Her best result was at the 2017 Regionals, where she placed 14th. She was introduced to Hyrox in 2019 while still a trainee nurse.

Weeks won the 2020 and 2021 Hyrox World Championships. She competed in the first season of the reality competition show Spartan Games in 2021. After placing in the top three in the first season, Weeks returned to compete in the second season in 2022. She competed in the 2022 HYROX World Championships while eight months pregnant and finished ninth. Less than a year after her pregnancy, she won the 2023 HYROX World Championships.

In 2024, Weeks won the first Hyrox Major of the 2024/25 season in Amsterdam, with a time of 58:12. She placed second at the second major and first in the third. In the fourth and final major of the season, Weeks beat her own world record and won the competition.

== Personal life ==
Weeks moved to South Carolina in 2014. She gave birth to a daughter in 2022.

== Competitive history ==
=== Hyrox ===
| Year | Event | Results | |
| Year | Event | Time | Rank |
|---|---|---|---|
| 2020 | HYROX World Championships | 1:09:47 | 1st place, gold medalist(s) |
| 2021 | HYROX North American Championships | 1:05:18 (WR) | 1st place, gold medalist(s) |
| 2021 | HYROX World Championships | 1:03:43 (WR) | 1st place, gold medalist(s) |
| 2022 (Note: During the 2022/23 season, Weeks was Pregnant. She was 4 months pregnant during the North American Championships and 8 months pregnant during the World Championships.) | HYROX North American Championships | 1:07:03 | 1st place, gold medalist(s) |
| 2022 | HYROX World Championships | 1:13:02 | 9 |
| 2023 | HYROX European Championships | 1:01:12 | 1st place, gold medalist(s) |
| 2023 | HYROX North American Championships | 1:03:44 | 3rd place, bronze medalist(s) |
| 2023 | HYROX World Championships | 59:51 | 1st place, gold medalist(s) |
| 2024 | HYROX European Championships | 58:03 (WR) | 1st place, gold medalist(s) |
| 2024 | HYROX North American Championships | 1:01:20 | 1st place, gold medalist(s) |
| 2024 | HYROX World Championships | 1:03:37 | 2nd place, silver medalist(s) |
| 2025 | HYROX Major #1 - Amsterdam | 0:58:12 | 1st place, gold medalist(s) |
| 2025 | HYROX Major #2 - Hong Kong | 1:00:31 | 2nd place, silver medalist(s) |
| 2025 | HYROX Major #3 - Las Vegas | 1:00:31 | 1st place, gold medalist(s) |
| 2025 | HYROX Major #4 - Glasgow | 0:56:23 (WR) | 1st place, gold medalist(s) |
| 2025 | HYROX North American Open Championships | 0:55:38* (Open WR) | 1st place, gold medalist(s) |
| 2025 | HYROX World Championships (E15 Solo) | 59:43 | 3rd place, bronze medalist(s) |
| 2025 | HYROX World Championships E15 doubles - with Lauren Griffith | 54:58 | 1st place, gold medalist(s) |
| 2026 - Season 8 | HYROX Major #1 - Hamburg (E15 Solo) | 59:13 | 3rd place, bronze medalist(s) |
| 2026 - Season 8 | HYROX Major #1 - Hamburg E15 Doubles - with Lauren Griffith | 54:39 | 1st place, gold medalist(s) |
| 2026 - Season 8 | HYROX Major #2 - Melbourne (E15 Solo) | 58:48 | 2nd place, silver medalist(s) |
| 2026 - Season 8 | HYROX Major #2 - Melbourne E15 Doubles - with Lauren Griffith | 56:16 | 6th |
| 2026 - Season 8 | HYROX Major #3 - Phoenix (E15 Solo) | 58:30 | 2nd place, silver medalist(s) |
| 2026 - Season 8 | HYROX Major #3 - Phoenix E15 Doubles - with Vivian Tafuto | 53:11 (WR) | 1st place, gold medalist(s) |
| 2026 - Season 8 | HYROX Regional - Americas Championship (E15 Solo) | 56:27 | 1st place, gold medalist(s) |
| 2026 - Season 8 | HYROX Regional - Americas Championship E15 Doubles - with Vivian Tafuto | 52:59 (WR) | 1st place, gold medalist(s) |
| 2026 - Season 8 | HYROX Major #4 - Warsaw (E15 Solo) | 54:54 | 2nd place, silver medalist(s) |
| 2026 - Season 8 | HYROX Major #4 - Warsaw E15 Doubles - with Vivian Tafuto | 52:11 (WR) | 1st place, gold medalist(s) |
| 2026 - Season 8 | HYROX World Championships (E15 Solo) | 58:47 | 5th |
| 2026 - Season 8 | HYROX World Championships E15 Doubles - with Vivian Tafuto | 53:31 | 1st place, gold medalist(s) |
| 2027 - Season 9 | HYROX Elite Race #1 - Hamburg (E15 Solo) | | |
| 2027 - Season 9 | HYROX Elite Race #1 - Hamburg E15 Doubles - with Vivian Tafuto | | |
| 2027 - Season 9 | HYROX Elite Race #2 - London (E15 Solo) | | |
| 2027 - Season 9 | HYROX Elite Race #2 - London E15 Doubles - with Vivian Tafuto | | |
