= Megan Jacoby =

American Hyrox competitor

Personal information
- Nickname: Meg Jacoby
- Born: 6 May 1991 (age 34)

Sport
- Country: United States
- Sport: Hyrox

Megan "Meg" Jacoby is an American Hyrox athlete. She won the 2024 Hyrox World Championships.

== Career ==
Jacoby was an NCAA Division I middle-distance runner at the University of Connecticut and Binghamton University where she also competed in cross-country.

Jacoby first heard of Hyrox in 2022. In her second Hyrox competition, HYROX Chicago 2022, she set a new women's pro world record: 1:01:56. Jacoby became a full-time Hyrox athlete in 2023. Jacoby was the first woman to complete a HYROX pro race in under one hour. She completed the HYROX Anaheim race in 58 minutes and 58 seconds on April 22, 2023, taking the record from Mikaela Norman. She won the 2024 HYROX World Championships and led the women's competition from the third station (sled pull) onward during the race.

== Personal life ==
Jacoby is from Endwell, New York, and is currently based in upstate New York. She has a daughter. Her brother is a professional bodybuilder.

== Competitive history ==
=== Hyrox ===
Year	Event	Results	
Year	Event	Time	Rank
2022	HYROX Chicago	1:01:56	1st place, gold medalist(s)
2023	HYROX European Championships	1:03:12	3rd place, bronze medalist(s)
2023	HYROX Anaheim	58:58	1st place, gold medalist(s)
2023	HYROX World Championships	1:00:23	2nd place, silver medalist(s)
2024	HYROX European Championships	1:00:26	2nd place, silver medalist(s)
2024	HYROX World Championships	59:59	1st place, gold medalist(s)
2024	HYROX Amsterdam	58:44	2nd place, silver medalist(s)
