= Amazfit =

Smartwatch brand by Huami

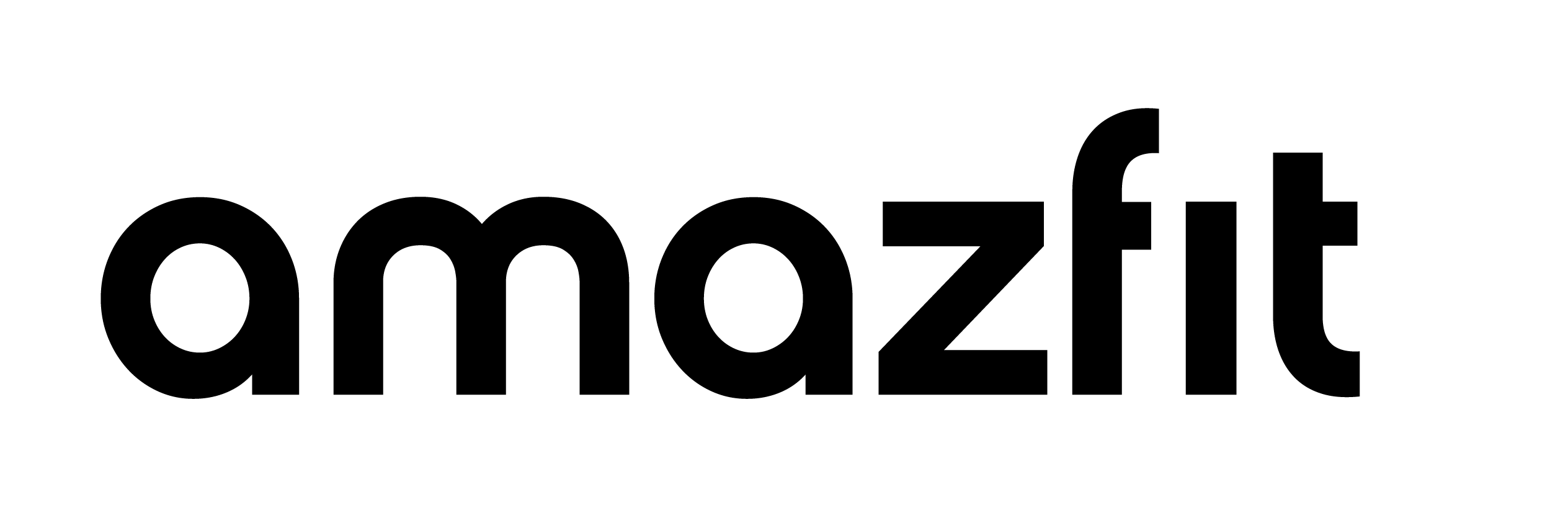
- Logo by Landor & Fitch introduced in 2021.
- Industry: Consumer electronics, smart wearable
- Founded: September 2015; 11 years ago
- Headquarters: Gorinchem, South Holland, Netherlands
- Products: Smartwatches, fitness trackers
- Owner: Zepp Health
- Website: www.amazfit.com

Amazfit is a brand of smartwatches and fitness trackers developed by Netherlands-based Zepp Health. The company's first smartwatch was introduced in 2016.

== History ==
In August 2016, Zepp Health predecessor Huami, a spinoff from Chinese multinational electronics company Xiaomi, introduced the first Amazfit smartwatch. In April 2017, Huami launched the Amazfit Health Band. In 2018, the company began selling its Amazfit Bip, a budget smartwatch. In September 2018, EE Times reported that Huami claimed to have developed the world's first RISC-V-based AI-powered wearable chipset, the Huangshan-1 AI chip. In July 2018, Huami announced it bought San Jose, California sensor technology company Zepp International Ltd. In September 2018, the company announced its Amazfit Verge smartwatch, and a new fitness band in China called the Amazfit Health Band 1S.

After the launch of Amazfit GTR series smartwatches, some problems were revealed, such as the screen was easy to be scratched and the positioning was severely shifted, which affected the usage.

In April 2020, Huami partnered with a laboratory led by Zhong Nanshan to use wearable devices to track activity for survivors of respiratory diseases.

In February 2021, Huami changed its name to Zepp Health.

In 2023, the company introduced its Amazfit Balance fitness tracker, and followed up with version 2 in 2025. The company's payment system, Zepp Pay, was introduced with the first Balance in 2023.

== Zepp Pay ==
Zepp Pay is an NFC cashless payment service supported by Amazfit wearable products. The company lists 33 European countries that issue cards that can be used with Zepp Pay.

== Zepp Health ==
Amazfit owner Zepp Health, formerly known as Huami, is based in the Netherlands.

== See also ==
- Xiaomi Pay
- Apple Pay
- Samsung Pay
