= FLINTA* =

German initialism for gender and sexual minorities

FLINTA* is a German acronym that stands for "Frauen, Lesben, Intergeschlechtliche, nichtbinäre, trans und agender Personen", meaning women, lesbians, intersex, non-binary, trans and agender people. The asterisk represents all non-binary gender identities. To explicitly include queer individuals, the term FLINTAQ is sometimes used.

== History ==
In the beginning of the 1970s the first so-called Frauenräume, spaces for women, emerged in West Germany and West Berlin. These spaces were created for women to be able to come together outside of patriarchal structures. From these women's spaces, many projects emerged, including lesbian groups, cafes for women, and 1976 the first women's shelter in West Berlin. By the 1980s there were already around 100 different women's groups, many of which also had a significant lesbian presence. Several of the safe spaces and groups were renamed as FrauenLesben-Räume, “WomenLesbian-Spaces”, to include and make additional discrimination of specifically lesbians – even by women – more visible.

Since the 1990s, there have been ongoing debates about whether such safe spaces should also be open to, for example, transgender or non-binary individuals. While there are still projects and spaces that adhere to the label "WomenLesbians," there are some that have opened their spaces further and expanded the designation to include, for example, FLT* — Women/Female, Lesbians, Trans*. Subsequently, within the queer community, efforts were made to find a term that includes everyone who suffers under patriarchal structures or faces discrimination based on their gender identity. All these individuals should feel safe in their respective spaces and events. Therefore, the term FLINTA* is currently often used, with the asterisk at the end serving as a placeholder to include all those who belong to this group but may not have been listed explicitly.

== Purpose ==
The term FLINTA*, or variations of it, is often used to create a safe space for people at events "who are patriarchally discriminated against based on their gender identity." In contrast to the term LGBTQIA+, which also includes asexual and non-heterosexual orientations, FLINTA* specifically refers to the gender identity of individuals. An exception to this is the "L" which stands for lesbian, as "although being a lesbian is generally considered a sexual orientation and not a gender identity, the term was included in the abbreviation to highlight feminist achievements, which are largely owed to the lesbian movement. Additionally, it aims to criticize the assumption in heteronormative society that sex and romantic relationships with cisgender men are an integral part of femininity." Theses such as "Lesbians are not women" (1978) by radical feminist Monique Wittig and lesbian separatism in general contributed to the mention of lesbians alongside women.

== Critique ==
Despite seemingly clear terms, FLINTA* is sometimes criticized for being unclear with who is welcome in these spaces. Sometimes trans women are welcome in FLINTA* spaces while trans men are not, or vice versa. This is often based in ideas about gender socialization, a concept that faces a lot of criticism in the trans community: "from a trans* perspective, a hegemonic concept of socialization... disregards the individual's resonance in the process of socialization." Trans women may face exclusion from FLINTA* spaces because of "male socialization", an idea which is often criticized for being transmisogynistic as it ignores experiences of misogyny trans women may have had at any stage of their transition. Furthermore, binary ideas of gender socialization can allow misogynistic behaviour by trans men to go unchallenged. This ignores the fact that prior experiences of misogynistic discrimination do not prevent someone behaving misogynistically. In instances where a safe space should be created for everyone who faces discrimination based on their gender identity, this leads to additional exclusion.

Some intersex activists have criticized the appropriation of intersexuality by non-intersex queer activists "for the deconstruction of the binary gender system." (Though not all intersex people identify with a binary gender system.) Despite the increasing openness of queer-feminist groups to create safe spaces for intersex individuals, their political concerns are rarely addressed.

== See also ==
- LGBTQIA
