= Training sled =

Exercise equipment that slides on the ground

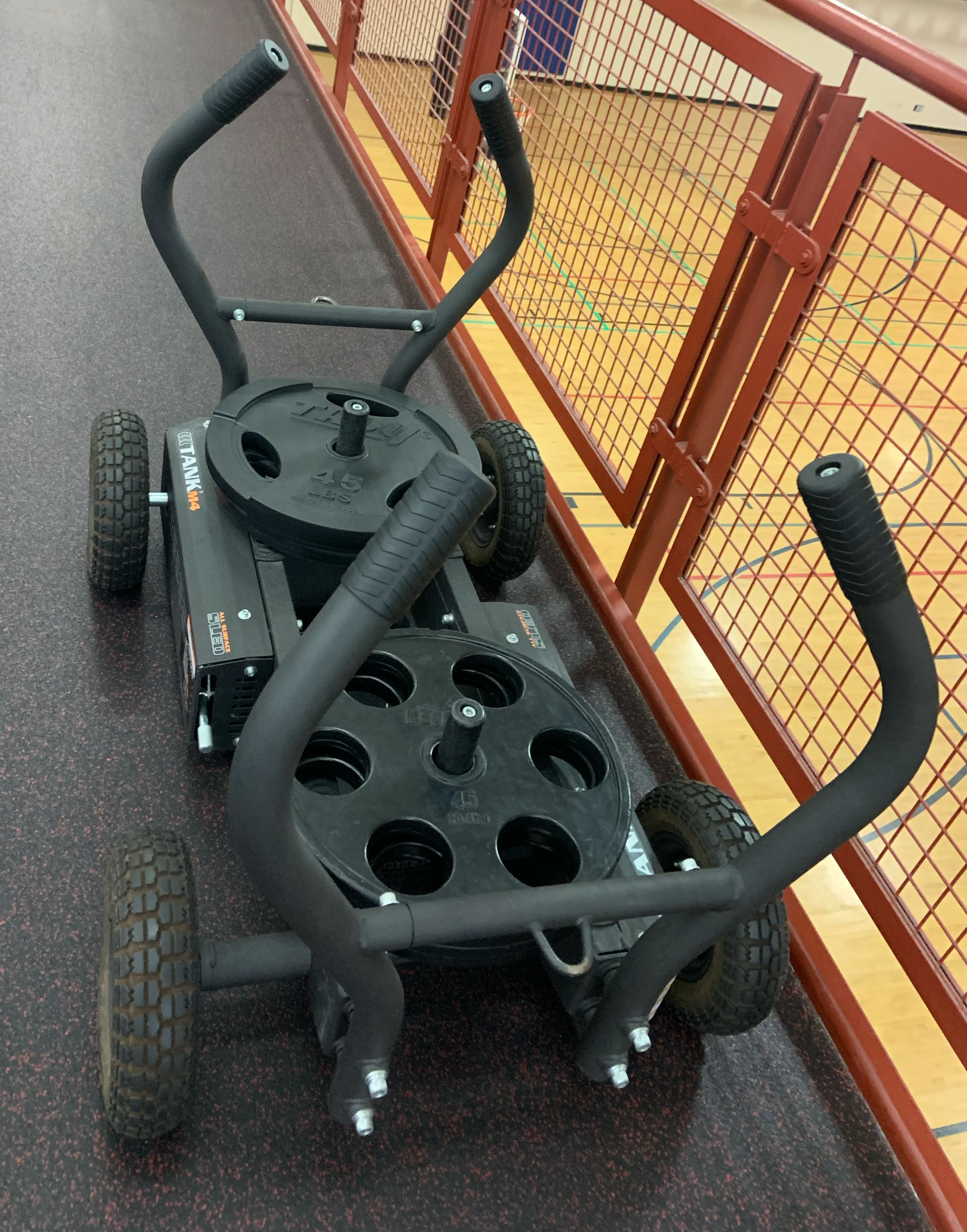
Training sled

A training sled, weight sled, or fitness sled is a piece of exercise equipment that provides resistance as the user pushes, pulls, or otherwise moves the sled along a flat surface. Commercial sleds allow easily adjusting the weight or resistance and are supported on feet or wheels that allow moving the sled across surfaces such as grass, turf, or pavement without damage. Training with sleds has become increasingly popular since 2015, due in part to their availability in Crossfit gyms. Sled pulling and sled pushing are commonly used forms of training for sprinting.

== Sled push ==
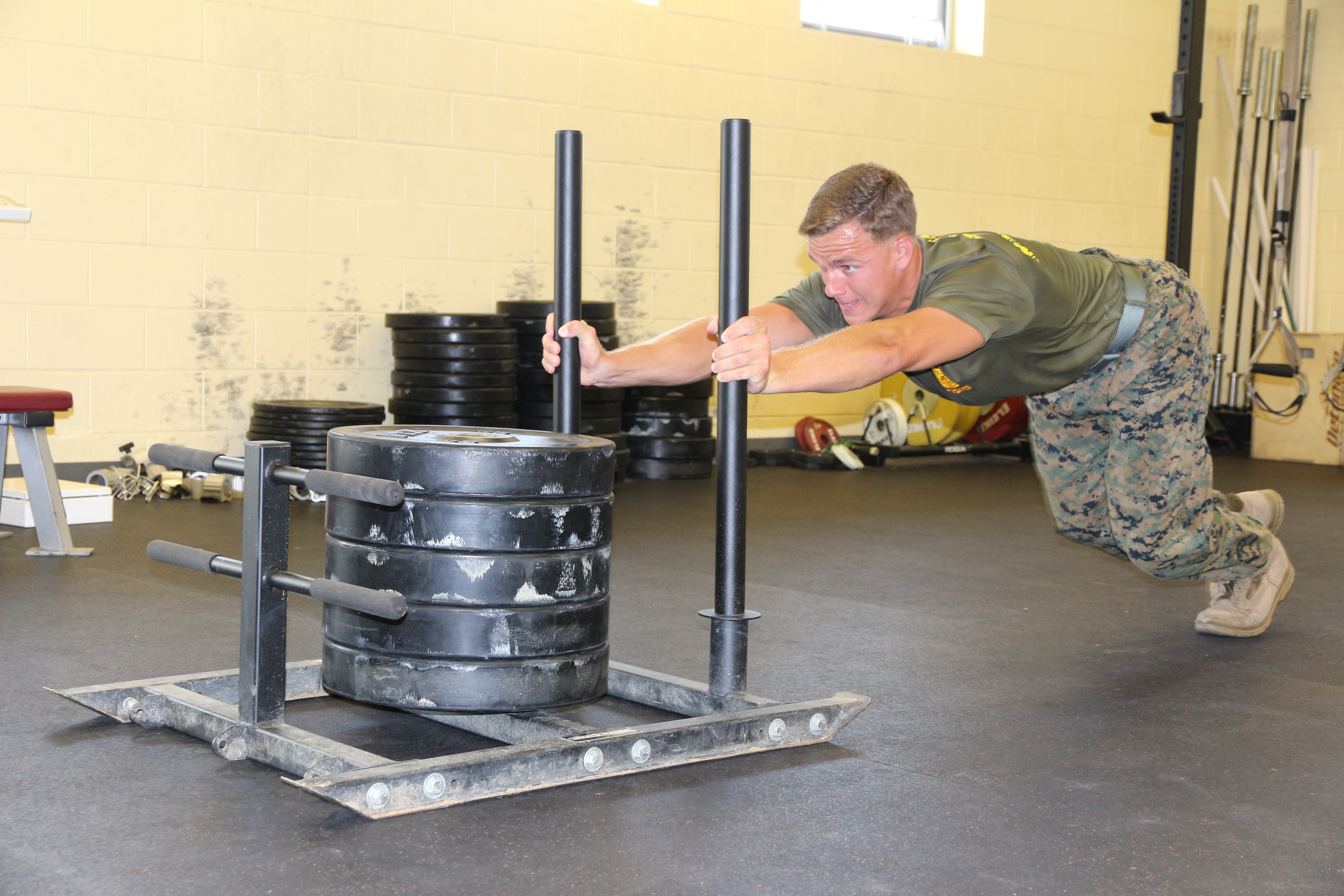
Demonstration of the sled push

The sled push involves pushing the sled forward while facing the sled. It may be done at a variety of angles, such as upright, slightly bent forward, or with the body low and close to horizontal. Sled pushes are roughly as effective as a barbell back squat for training the quadriceps, hamstrings, and core, with higher calf activity and lower activity in muscles near the spine. The sled push also works the chest, arms, and shoulder muscles.

Although sled pushing is a classic exercise, athletic science has mainly focused on sled pulling, leaving sled pushing understudied. One study found that the maximum velocity attainable during pushing decreases approximately linearly with total load, similarly to sled pulling, suggesting the analogous use of %Vdec to quantify load. This method of prescribing load first measures the velocity attained without any resistance, then adds weight so as to attain the target velocity which is the given percent less than the resistance-free velocity. For example, if the resistance-free velocity is 5 m/s, and the goal is 20% Vdec, one would add weight so as to achieve a velocity of 5*(1-20%)=4 m/s. Another study found that complex training using sled pushing followed by sprinting improved sprint performance.

== Sled pull ==
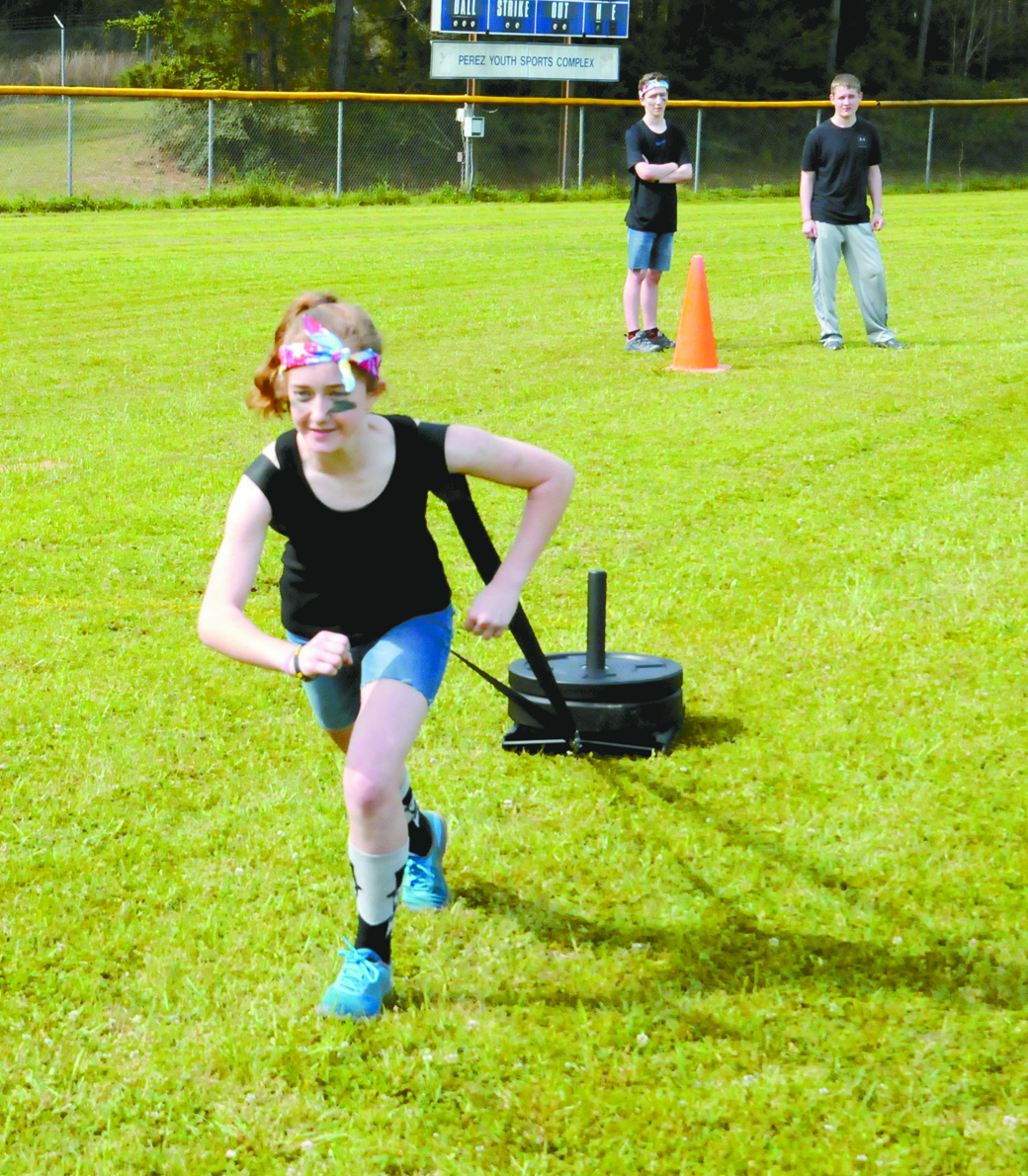
Demonstration of the sled pull

The sled pull exercise involves attaching a harness or straps to the sled, or simply grabbing onto it. The user may walk forward, towing the sled, or face the sled and walk backwards while pulling the sled along.

Several methods of prescribing load exist, such as an absolute weight, a percent of body mass (%BM), %Vdec, or the percent of maximum load movable a given distance without stopping or going below a specified velocity (%MRSL). The body-weight and absolute methods are simple but poor choices as they does not account for individual variation in strength or differences in surface friction. Cahill et al. recommend the %Vdec method for general use.

Sled pulling has been shown to improve sprint performance. Studies before 2014 used very light loads (<10% Vdec) to ensure sprint technique was unaffected, finding insignificant effects. More recent research has found that heavier loads are more effective in sprint training, although providing a disparate physical stimulus. A wide range of loads, 10–30 %Vdec, has been shown to be effective. Cahill et al. divide the loads as follows: <10% Vdec for technical high-speed training, <35% Vdec for training focusing on speed, 48-52% Vdec for training power output, and >65% Vdec for training focusing on strength.

== Other exercises ==
A lateral sled drag or pull involves dragging or pulling the sled while facing sideways. Sled rotations consist of turning the sled in place. With a suspension strap, it is possible to do common upper body exercises such as rows, curls, presses, and reverse fly.
