= Elisa Fuliano =

Italian female CrossFit athlete

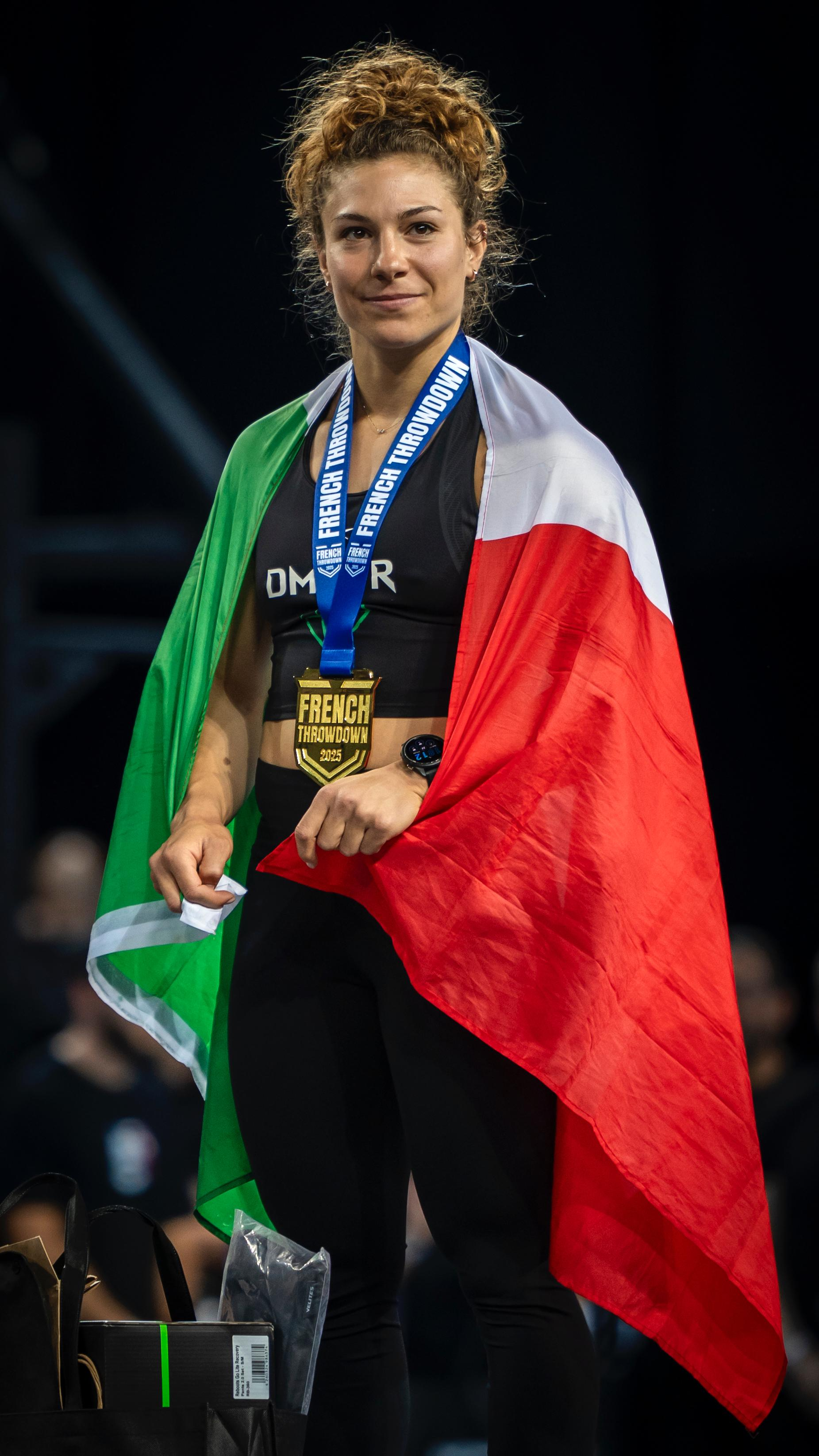
- Elisa Fuliano French Throwdown 2025

Personal information
- Nickname: Fulix
- Nationality: Italian
- Born: July 9, 1996 (age 30) Genoa, Italy
- Height: 157 cm (5 ft 2 in)
- Weight: 61 kg (134 lb)

Sport
- Sport: CrossFit
- Club: CrossFit Altessano
- Coached by: Matteo Agnello

Elisa Fuliano (born 9 July 1996 in Genoa, Italy), also known as Fulix, is a professional Italian CrossFit athlete.

Fuliano is the first Italian athlete to have qualified for and competed in the Individual Women category at the CrossFit Games, the discipline's world championship, achieving this feat for three consecutive years (2022, 2023, and 2024).

She is also the first Italian athlete to qualify for the Rogue Invitational through the highly selective qualification process known as "The Q".

== Biography ==
Born and raised in Genoa, Fuliano developed a passion for competitive activity early in life.

Her first sports disciplines included artistic gymnastics and track and field. In track and field, she specialized as a sprinter, competing in the 100m, 200m, and indoor 60m and 80m events, as well as the pole vault, where she achieved a personal best of 3.00 meters.

After earning her language high school diploma from Liceo Grazia Deledda, where she studied English, French and Spanish, she attended the Ligurian Academy of Fine Arts in Genoa. She subsequently moved to Turin, where she obtained a degree in Digital Communication Design from IAAD (Istituto d'Arte Applicata e Design). Her relocation to Turin for academic and professional reasons marked the end of her track and field career and the beginning of her CrossFit journey.

== Health and athletic management ==
In September 2021 she was diagnosed with Rheumatoid Arthritis, an autoimmune condition affecting the joints, following an onset of severe pain in her hands and wrists that temporarily restricted her daily activities and training.

Despite initial medical advice suggesting a halt to high-intensity training, she continued to compete at an elite level, achieving milestones such as a 160 kg back squat. Her athletic management relies on a specialized, personalized protocol focused on nutrition, recovery, and the targeted management of joint inflammation. Due to her high-level athletic performance while managing a chronic autoimmune disorder, her training and therapeutic regimen have attracted medical interest regarding physical activity guidelines for athletes with rheumatic conditions.

She currently trains in Turin at CrossFit Altessano under the guidance of coach Matteo Agnello, following the training program he founded in 2021: Demantur Program. She quickly established herself as Italy's top athlete before gaining international recognition.

== Career ==
=== CrossFit Games ===
The CrossFit Games is the annual world championship of CrossFit. The qualification pathway for the Individual Women category is highly selective and structured in three progressive elimination phases: the Open, the Quarterfinals, and the Semifinals.

In 2021, Fuliano had her first serious attempt at qualifying for the CrossFit Games. She finished the global Open in 306th place and ranked 3rd in Italy, demonstrating her rapidly growing competitive strength. She advanced to the Quarterfinals, placing 125th in Europe, but did not progress to the Semifinals. This experience marked a pivotal learning year that set the stage for her subsequent four consecutive Games qualifications starting in 2022.

In 2022, Fuliano made her debut at the CrossFit Games in Madison. She finished the Open and Quarterfinals as the 3rd Fittest woman in Italy. She secured her Games spot by placing 5th at the European Semifinal, CrossFit Strength in Depth in London. Competing as the sole Italian female athlete, she finished 35th overall at the Games, earning her first title as "Fittest in Italy".

In 2023, Fuliano qualified for her second consecutive CrossFit Games through the Semifinal held in Berlin, where she placed 9th. She achieved her best finish yet at the Games in Madison, concluding the competition in 20th place overall, the highest placement ever for an Italian female athlete. She was again crowned "Fittest in Italy".

In 2024, Fulix qualified for the third consecutive time for the CrossFit Games in Fort Worth through the Semifinal held at the LDLC Arena in Lyon during the "French Throwdown." Despite having her strongest qualification season (8th at the Semifinals), her participation in the Games ended early. She withdrew after three events (39th overall) as a mark of respect for the Serbian athlete Lazar Đukić, who died on 8 August 2024, during the first open-water swimming workout in Marine Creek Lake. Fulix stated that her decision to withdraw was a mark of respect for the athlete Lazar Đukić. Her choice was shared by other competitors and widely reported in sports media as a stance on athlete safety and community ethics. Despite the withdrawal, she claimed the title of "Fittest in Italy" for the third consecutive time.

In February 2025, Fuliano announced her decision not to register for the CrossFit Open, effectively withdrawing from the 2025 Games season's qualification pathway. She cited the emotional toll of the events at the previous year's Games and a lack of belief that sufficient safety measures had been implemented. She stated her intention to focus instead on major off-season international competitions.

Nevertheless, during the season she competed in both qualifying events for the CrossFit Games: the Wodland Fest in Malaga and the French Throwdown in Montpellier, where a top-two finish secured access to the Games. She placed second in Malaga and first in Montpellier, thereby earning her fourth qualification to the CrossFit Games twice. However, despite securing both qualifications, she was unable to participate as she was not eligible for that, having not taken part in either the Open or the Quarterfinals.

In the 2026 season, Fuliano began her competitive campaign by advancing through the worldwide CrossFit Open and the subsequent online Quarterfinals, where she finished 17th overall in the Europe region to secure her ticket to the next stage. In May, she competed at the French Throwdown in Paris, which served as the official CrossFit Games Europe Semifinal. Despite fierce competition for only three available qualifying spots for the finals, the Italian athlete captured third place overall in the Women's Elite Individual division, accumulating 470 total points. Her performance in the sixth and final event of the weekend proved decisive, where a third-place finish allowed her to overcome a 12-point deficit and surpass Norway's Leah Storen in the standings. By finishing on the podium behind Switzerland's Mirjam von Rohr and Great Britain's Aimee Cringle, Fuliano officially earned her fifth career invitation to the CrossFit Games.

In late July, Fuliano competed in the finals of the 2026 CrossFit Games, facing the world's elite in the discipline. Throughout the four days of competition, she demonstrated exceptional form and achieved highly significant placements in individual workouts, highlighted by a 2nd-place finish in the Handstand Sprint, a 3rd place in the Speed Snatch, and a 4th place in the Climbing Snail.

Driven by consistent performances across all events on the schedule, she concluded the tournament with a total of 926 points, securing 9th place overall globally. This result marks the highest placement ever achieved by an Italian female athlete in the Individual category at the CrossFit Games, establishing her position within elite international fitness. She was again crowned "Fittest in Italy". Following the 2026 season, Fuliano and her coach Matteo Agnello opted for an extended off-season with no competitions until the 2027 CrossFit Games qualification stages, with the stated aim of reaching the top five worldwide.

=== International Competitions ===
Outside of the CrossFit Games season, Fuliano has actively competed in several other major international events, which have provided her with crucial exposure to the global CrossFit field.

In 2021, she represented Italy at the Functional Fitness World Championships in Norrköping, Sweden where she finished 5th.

In 2022, she secured a significant victory at the German Throwdown.

The following year, 2023, proved strong, with her achieving Top 10 finishes at major sanctionals: placing 7th at Wodapalooza in Miami and an impressive 5th at the Dubai Fitness Championship.

Her momentum continued into 2024, where she placed 9th at the Dubai Fitness Championship, finished 2nd at the Belgrade Games, and placed 8th at the French Throwdown, that year's Europe Semifinal event.

The 2025 season saw her continue this high-level performance, taking 5th place at Wodapalooza, 2nd at the Wodland Fest in Málaga, and ultimately winning the French Throwdown in Montpellier with a total of 664 points, including a notable performance in the "Heavy Isabel" event with a time of 3:47.60.

In 2025 she set a historic milestone for Italian CrossFit, becoming the first and only Italian athlete to qualify for the prestigious Rogue Invitational. After dominating “The Q”qualification tournament with an overall 1st-place finish worldwide, she competed in Aberdeen, Scotland, placing 16th overall and establishing herself among the top twenty strongest female athletes in the world.

In 2026, Fuliano competed in the TYR Wodapalooza in Miami. Her performance was significantly impacted by a quadriceps tear sustained approximately ten days before the event while practicing a competition circuit involving squats and biking. Despite the injury, she attempted to compete but was forced to withdraw (WD) after completing three workouts. She officially finished in 18th place in the Elite Individual category.

In 2026, Fuliano returned to the Rogue Invitational, this time by invitation rather than through “The Q”, the online qualifier through which she had earned her place in 2025. The competition took place from 23 to 25 October at P&J Live in Aberdeen, Scotland, with 20 athletes in the field, including reigning CrossFit Games champion Aimee Cringle and eventual winner Lucy Campbell. Fuliano described the invitation as a great source of satisfaction, noting that the event’s strongman-influenced workouts were particularly demanding for an athlete of her size (1.58 m, 61 kg). She finished 12th with 400 points, improving four places on her 16th-place finish of the previous year. Her best individual result was 5th place in the strength event “The Viking”.

=== National Competitions ===
In Italy, Fuliano has been a consistent frontrunner since 2020, winning competitions such as the Wodagoa in 2020 and 2021 in the M/W team division.

In 2021, she claimed the national title at the Italian Functional Fitness Championships in Senigallia and took 1st place at the Tuscany Games.

In subsequent years, she continued to achieve significant placements, including a victory at the UBL Italian Championship in 2025, confirming her position as one of the most important figures on the national scene.

=== Hyrox ===
Fuliano has also competed in Hyrox events, which combine running and functional workout stations, showcasing her hybrid fitness capabilities.

In October 2024, she competed in the HYROX Milan event in the Women's Doubles category alongside Camilla Massa, winning the division with a time of 1:01:37, beating 584 other teams.

In 2025, she competed in the Rimini HYROX event in Mixed Doubles with her coach, Matteo Agnello, finishing 18th.

== Television Appearances ==
In 2026, Fuliano competed in the Netflix reality competition series Physical Italia: da 100 a 1 (the Italian adaptation of the Physical: 100 franchise). Her notable achievements and results during the show included:

The Opening Plank (Episode 1): She finished in 1st place overall in the suspension grid plank challenge—surviving for 1 hour and 27 minutes and beating all remaining contestants (including all male competitors)—thereby securing safety and advancing past the first cut from 100 to 80 participants.

Duels: She successfully won her individual head-to-head duel against television personality and kickboxer Elisabetta Canalis.

Team & Later Challenges: Fuliano advanced to the team stage of Physical 100: Italy, where she was one of eight team captains. Her team lost the “Forgotten Temple” challenge to the team led by Sebastian Rodwell. She then represented her team in the “Pillars of Hercules” redemption challenge, in which she was the first participant to lose her grip, and her team was eliminated.

== Achievements ==
=== CrossFit Games and Qualification Stages ===
Year	Event	Italy Rank	Europe Rank	Worldwide Rank
2021	Open	3rd	86th	306th
2021	Quarterfinals	3rd	125th	415th
2022	Open	3rd	41st	119th
2022	Quarterfinals	3rd	34th	71st
2022	Semifinals	—	5th	—
2022	CrossFit Games	—	—	35th
2023	Open	1st	2nd	12th
2023	Quarterfinals	1st	10th	22nd
2023	Semifinals	—	9th	—
2023	CrossFit Games	—	—	20th
2024	Open	1st	13th	36th
2024	Quarterfinals	1st	6th	11th
2024	Semifinals	—	8th	—
2024	CrossFit Games	—	—	39th
2026	Open	1st	26th	65th
2026	Quarterfinals	1st	17th	49th
2026	Crossfit Games	—	—	9th

=== Major International and Sanctioned Competitions ===
Year	Event	Position
2021	Functional Fitness World Championships	5th
2022	German Throwdown	1st
2023	Wodapalooza	7th
2023	Dubai Fitness Championship	5th
2024	Belgrade Games	2nd
2024	Dubai Fitness Championship	9th
2025	Wodapalooza	5th
2025	French Throwdown	1st
2025	Wodland Fest	2nd
2025	Rogue Invitational	16th
2026	Wodapalooza	18th
2026	French Throwdown	3rd
2026	Wodcelona	2nd
2026	Rogue Invitational	12th

=== Other Competitions ===
Year	Event	Position
2021	Fittest Freakest	2nd
2021	Italian Functional Fitness Championship	1st
2021	Wodagoa	1st
2021	Tuscany Games	1st
2022	Wodagoa	1st
2022	WW4M	8th
2025	Ubl Italian Championship	1st

== Personal Records ==
Categoria	Esercizio	Massimale
Weightlifting	Back Squat	160 kg
Weightlifting	Front Squat	135 kg
Weightlifting	Clean & Jerk	115 kg
Weightlifting	Snatch	91 kg
Weightlifting	Power Clean	108 kg
Weightlifting	Power Snatch	84 kg
Weightlifting	Shoulder Press	61 kg
Weightlifting	Jerk	120 kg
Weightlifting	Bench Press	95 kg
Weightlifting	Deadlift	165 kg
Weightlifting	Push Press	95 kg
Gymnastics	Toes to Bar	70
Gymnastics	Pull-ups	71
Gymnastics	Chest to Bar	52
Gymnastics	Bar Muscle-ups	40
Gymnastics	Ring Muscle-ups	21
Handstand	HSPU	80
Handstand	HSPU Strict Face Wall	40

== Personal bests in athletics ==
Event	Performance	Date	Location
50 m	6.98 s	08/01/2011	Nice
60 m	8.15 s	21/01/2012	Florence
100 m	13.06 s	03/02/2013	Genoa
200 m	27.71 s	26/01/2014	Genoa
400 m	1:04.3	26/01/2014	Genoa
600 m	1:58.09	26/01/2014	Genoa
1000 m	3:44.1	26/01/2014	Monte Carlo
Long jump	4.70 m	26/01/2014	Genoa
Triple jump	10.00 m	26/01/2014	Imperia
High jump	1.35 m	26/01/2014	Genoa
Pole vault	3.00 m	26/01/2014	Genoa
