= 2026 Rogue Invitational =

Athletic competition

2025 Rogue Invitational
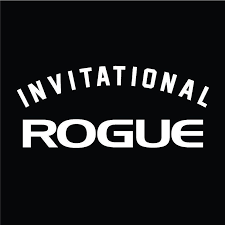
- Venue: P&J Live
- Location: Aberdeen, Scotland
- Dates: October 23–25, 2026

Champions
- CrossFit men: (United States) Dallin Pepper; CrossFit women: (United Kingdom) Lucy Campbell; Strongman: (United States) Trey Mitchell; Strongwoman: (United States) Angelica Jardine

The 2025 Rogue Invitational is the eighth annual sporting event organized by Rogue Fitness to be held from October 23 to October 25, 2026, at P&J Live in Aberdeen, Scotland. It features competitors from the sport of CrossFit, strongman, and strongwoman. Dallin Pepper won the men's CrossFit competiion, while Lucy Campbell won the women's. Trey Mitchell and Angelica Jardine are the respective winner of the strongman and strongwoman competition.

This year's Rogue Invitational is the 8th competition in CrossFit, 6th in strongman, and 3rd in strongwoman. 19 men and 20 women compete in the CrossFit divisions, and 9 men and 9 women compete in the strongman and strongwoman competitions. This year Rogue increased its prize purse to $1,215,000 in cash and an additional investment of $275,000 of Bitcoin, money from ticket and apparel sales as well as 10% of online registration fees from "The Q" and the community event ("The C") going into the prize pot.

== Competitiors ==
CrossFit athletes are invited based on the Rogue point ranking system, and a few are also invited from the online "Q" qualifier held on August 21–23. 20 men and 20 women were invited but due to a number of injuries only 19 men will compete in CrossFit events.

Ten strongmen and ten strongwomen were also invited, but only nine from each category competed. Hafþór Júlíus Björnsson withdrew for unspecified reason but was replaced by Pavlo Kordiyaka.

=== CrossFit men ===
- (Canada) Jeff Adler
- (Authorised Neutral Athletes) ~~Roman Khrennikov~~ (Note: Late withdrawal due to injury)
- (Australia) Ricky Garard
- (United States) Jayson Hopper
- (United States) James Sprague
- (Australia) Jay Crouch
- (United States) Dallin Pepper
- (United States) Colten Mertens
- (Brazil) Guilherme Malheiros
- (United States) Chandler Smith
- (Germany) Moritz Fiebig
- (United States) Tudor Magda
- (Finland) Henrik Haapalainen
- (Netherlands) Fabian Hermans
- (United States) Nate Ackermann
- (United States) Chris Ibarra
- (New Zealand) Bayley Martin
- (United Kingdom) Harry Lightfoot
- (Australia) Isaac Newman
- (United States) Saxon Panchik

=== CrossFit women ===
- (United States) Arielle Loewen
- (United States) Danielle Brandon
- (United States) Alex Gazan
- (Hungary) Laura Horvath
- (Canada) Emma Lawson
- (United Kingdom) Lucy Campbell
- (Australia) Madeline Sturt
- (United States) Olivia Kerstetter
- (United Kingdom) Aimee Cringle
- (Poland) Gabriela Migała
- (Canada) Emily Rolfe
- (United States) Abigail Domit
- (United States) Dani Speegle
- (United States) Paige Rodgers
- (Italy) Elisa Fuliano
- (Sweden) Emma Tall
- (Scotland) Jennifer Muir
- (Canada) Carolyne Prevost
- (United States) Kyra Milligan
- (Albania) Siria Meha

=== Strongman ===
- (Canada) Mitchell Hooper
- (Iceland) ~~Hafthor Björnsson~~ (Note: Withdrawn and replaced by Pavlo Kordiyaka)
- (Scotland) ~~Tom Stoltman~~
- (United States) Trey Mitchell
- (United States) Austin Andrade
- (South Africa) Rayno Nel
- (Latvia) Martins Licis
- (Czech Republic) Ondřej Fojtů
- (United States) Thomas Evans
- (United Kingdom) Paddy Haynes
- (Ukraine) Pavlo Kordiyaka

=== Strongwoman ===
- (Puerto Rico) Inez Carrasquillo
- (Ukraine) ~~Olga Liashchuk~~
- (United States) Angelica Jardine
- (United Kingdom) Grace Hilbourne
- (United Kingdom) Lucy Underdown
- (United Kingdom) Andrea Thompson
- (Australia) Katie Blunden
- (United Kingdom) Rebecca Roberts
- (United Kingdom) Jennifer Lyle
- (Canada) Jackie Osczevski

== CrossFit ==
=== Event 1: River Dee ===
7 Rounds:

- 11 Calorie SkiErg
- 7 Wall Walk
- 11 Calorie SkiErg
- 7 Devil's Press (50 m/35 f)

#	Men	Time	Pts Total	Women	Time	Pts Total
1	(United States) James Sprague	18:29.07	100	(United Kingdom) Lucy Campbell	18:50.15	100
2	(United States) Dallin Pepper	18:51.81	95	(Albania) Siria Meha	19:05.42	95
3	(United Kingdom) Harry Lightfoot	19:20.32	90	(Poland) Gabriela Migała	19:07.39	90
4	(United States) Jayson Hopper	19:21.16	85	(United States) Olivia Kerstetter	19:12.33	85
5	(United States) Chris Ibarra	19:23.06	80	(Canada) Emma Lawson	19:12.58	80
6	(Canada) Jeffrey Adler	19:34.47	75	(Sweden) Emma Tall	19:14.96	75
7	(United States) Colten Mertens	19:47.35	70	(United Kingdom) Aimee Cringle	19:37.27	70
8	(Australia) Jay Crouch	19:57.53	65	(United States) Danielle Brandon	19:48.83	65
9	(United States) Tudor Magda	20:45.29	60	(United States) Arielle Loewen	19:52.43	60
10	(Germany) Moritz Fiebig	20:45.46	55	(Canada) Emily Rolfe	20:39.48	55
11	(United States) Chandler Smith	21:13.16	50	(United States) Kyra Milligan	20:46.08	50
12	(United States) Saxon Panchik	21:42.83	45	(Scotland) Jennifer Muir	20:55.32	45
13	(Finland) Henrik Haapalainen	21:51.20	40	(United States) Abigail Domit	21:15.63	40
14	(Netherlands) Fabian Hermans	22:07.97	35	(United States) Alex Gazan	21:19.33	35
15	(Australia) Isaac Newman	22:16.75	30	(Australia) Madeline Sturt	21:24.58	30
16	(New Zealand) Bayley Martin	22:21.91	25	(Italy) Elisa Fuliano	21:33.68	25
17	(Australia) Ricky Garard	22:38.06	20	(United States) Dani Speegle	22:05.06	20
18	(Brazil) Guilherme Malheiros	23:04.40	15	(United States) Paige Rodgers	22:55.77	15
19	(United States) Nate Ackermann	23:34.43	10	(Canada) Carolyne Prevost	23:25.84	10
20			0	(Hungary) Laura Horvath	23:51.52	0

=== Event 2: Single Malt ===
- 10 Back Squat (315/225 lb)
- Hill Run
- 8 Back Squat (335/235 lb)
- Hill Carry (150/100 lb)
- 6 Back Squat (355/ 250 lb)
- Hill Carry (125/75 lb)
- 4 Back Squat (375/265 lb)
- Hill Carry (100/70 lb)
- 2 Back Squat (405/285 lb)
- Hill Run

Time cap: 12 minutes

#	Men	Time	Pts Total	Women	Time	Pts Total
1	(United States) Colten Mertens	04:45.97	170	(Hungary) Laura Horvath	05:35.37	100
2	(New Zealand) Bayley Martin	05:03.68	120	(United States) Kyra Milligan	05:49.68	145
3	(Australia) Jay Crouch	05:10.93	155	(United Kingdom) Lucy Campbell	05:54.83	190
4	(United States) Dallin Pepper	05:12.00	180	(Poland) Gabriela Migała	05:58.20	175
5	(United States) James Sprague	05:19.05	180	(United States) Alex Gazan	06:08.22	115
6	(United States) Chandler Smith	05:19.93	125	(Australia) Madeline Sturt	06:10.40	105
7	(Brazil) Guilherme Malheiros	05:27.56	85	(Canada) Carolyne Prevost	06:12.43	80
8	(Canada) Jeffrey Adler	05:29.79	140	(Scotland) Jennifer Muir	06:15.96	110
9	(United States) Tudor Magda	05:37.91	120	(Italy) Elisa Fuliano	06:16.10	85
10	(Netherlands) Fabian Hermans	05:40.39	90	(United States) Dani Speegle	06:23.99	75
11	(Australia) Isaac Newman	05:54.74	80	(Sweden) Emma Tall	06:28.55	125
12	(United States) Jayson Hopper	05:54.94	130	(Canada) Emma Lawson	06:29.89	125
13	(United States) Nate Ackermann	06:08.29	50	(Canada) Emily Rolfe	06:35.54	95
14	(United Kingdom) Harry Lightfoot	06:14.00	125	(United States) Olivia Kerstetter	06:39.36	120
15	(Germany) Moritz Fiebig	06:26.90	85	(United Kingdom) Aimee Cringle	06:50.74	100
16	(Australia) Ricky Garard	06:39.75	45	(Albania) Siria Meha}}	07:37.53	120
17	(Finland) Henrik Haapalainen	07:13.84	60	(United States) Abigail Domit	07:39.20	60
18	(United States) Saxon Panchik	07:27.90	60	(United States) Arielle Loewen	08:58.88	75
19	(United States) Chris Ibarra	08:30.23	90	(United States) Paige Rodgers	CAP+3	25
20				(United States) Danielle Brandon	CAP+40	65

=== Event 3: The Viking ===
Viking Press

- 60 Second Max Reps

200 lb/135 lb

(Tie-break by number of reps at 30 seconds.)

#	Men	Reps	Pts Total	Women	Reps	Pts Total
1	(United States) Colten Mertens	30	270	(United States) Dani Speegle	33	175
2	(Australia) Ricky Garard	30	140	(United States) Alex Gazan	29	210
3	(United States) Tudor Magda	29	210	(United Kingdom) Aimee Cringle	29	190
4	(United States) Dallin Pepper	28	265	(United States) Olivia Kerstetter	25	205
5	(Brazil) Guilherme Malheiros	26	165	(Sweden) Emma Tall	24	205
6	(Germany) Moritz Fiebig	25	160	(Italy) Elisa Fuliano	24	160
7	(United Kingdom) Harry Lightfoot	24	195	(Poland) Gabriela Migała	24	250
8	(Australia) Jay Crouch	24	220	(United States) Paige Rodgers	24	90
9	(United States) Jayson Hopper	23	190	(United States) Kyra Milligan	22	205
10	(New Zealand) Bayley Martin	23	175	(Scotland) Jennifer Muir	22	165
11	(United States) James Sprague	23	235	(Hungary) Laura Horvath	20	150
12	(United States) Chandler Smith	20	170	(Canada) Emma Lawson	20	170
13	(Netherlands) Fabian Hermans	20	130	(Canada) Emily Rolfe	19	135
14	(United States) Nate Ackermann	19	85	(Canada) Carolyne Prevost	18	115
15	(Australia) Isaac Newman	17	110	(United Kingdom) Lucy Campbell	18	220
16	(United States) Chris Ibarra	17	115	(United States) Abigail Domit	18	85
17	(Finland) Henrik Haapalainen	15	80	(Australia) Madeline Sturt	17	125
18	(Canada) Jeffrey Adler	13	155	(Albania) Siria Meha	15	135
19	(United States) Saxon Panchik	13	70	(United States) Arielle Loewen	14	85
20				(United States) Danielle Brandon	10	65

=== Event 4: Packout ===
5 Rounds:

- 750 Meter Run
- 30/25 Toes to Bar
- 20 ft Yoke Carry (665lbs M / 486lbs F)

#	Men	Time	Pts Total	Women	Time	Pts Total
1	(Australia) Ricky Garard	20:42.54	240	(United Kingdom) Aimee Cringle	20:25.33	290
2	(Australia) Jay Crouch	20:50.33	315	(United Kingdom) Lucy Campbell	20:52.21	315
3	(Canada) Jeffrey Adler	20:57.07	245	(Poland) Gabriela Migała	21:32.48	340
4	(United States) Chris Ibarra	21:26.84	200	(Canada) Emma Lawson	21:43.77	255
5	(Finland) Henrik Haapalainen	21:31.97	160	(United States) Arielle Loewen	21:47.83	165
6	(United States) Jayson Hopper	21:48.47	265	(Hungary) Laura Horvath	22:06.02	225
7	(New Zealand) Bayley Martin	21:49.25	245	(United States) Abigail Domit	22:33.75	155
8	(United States) Tudor Magda	22:07.98	275	(Australia) Madeline Sturt	22:52.31	190
9	(Australia) Isaac Newman	22:12.68	170	(United States) Danielle Brandon	22:52.72	125
10	(United States) James Sprague	22:13.04	290	(Canada) Emily Rolfe	22:56.96	190
11	(Brazil) Guilherme Malheiros	22:35.16	215	(United States) Kyra Milligan	23:01.08	255
12	(United States) Saxon Panchik	22:42.14	115	(Scotland) Jennifer Muir	23:08.86	210
13	(United States) Dallin Pepper	22:44.42	305	(Sweden) Emma Tall	23:09.61	245
14	(Germany) Moritz Fiebig	22:46.29	195	(United States) Alex Gazan	23:30.10	245
15	(Netherlands) Fabian Hermans	22:52.49	160	(United States) Olivia Kerstetter	23:38.19	235
16	(United States) Chandler Smith	23:13.57	195	(Albania) Siria Meha	23:40.47	160
17	(United States) Colten Mertens	23:49.91	290	(Italy) Elisa Fuliano	23:49.95	180
18	(United Kingdom) Harry Lightfoot	24:05.75	210	(United States) Paige Rodgers	23:52.52	105
19	(United States) Nate Ackermann	25:04.89	95	(Canada) Carolyne Prevost	25:48.50	125
20				(United States) Dani Speegle	26:52.68	175

=== Event 5: The Duel VI ===
Bracket-style event

- 65ft Husafell Carry (150lbs M/100lbs F)
- 65 Sled Pull (275 lbs M/175 lbs F)
- 3 Bags in Teeter (100 lbs M/70 lbs F, 150 lbs M /100 lbs F, 200 lbs M /150 lbs F)

#	Men	Round (Time)	Pts Total	Women	Round (Time)	Pts Total
1	(United States) Jayson Hopper	5 (32.57)	365	(Hungary) Laura Horvath	5 (36.79)	325
2	(United States) Dallin Pepper	5 (33.26)	400	(United States) Alex Gazan	5 (40.39)	340
3	(United States) Tudor Magda	4 (34.15)	365	(United States) Dani Speegle	4 (37.58)	265
4	(Finland) Henrik Haapalainen	4 (34.24)	245	(Sweden) Emma Tall	4 (37.94)	330
5	(United States) James Sprague	4 (35.29)	370	(Canada) Emma Lawson	4 (38.06)	335
6	(Australia) Ricky Garard	3 (32.81)	315	(United States) Olivia Kerstetter	3 (39.59)	310
7	(Australia) Isaac Newman	3 (32.82)	240	(Scotland) Jennifer Muir	3 (40.40)	280
8	(New Zealand) Bayley Martin	3 (33.22)	310	(United States) Arielle Loewen	3 (40.64)	230
9	(Australia) Jay Crouch	3 (34.04)	375	(Poland) Gabriela Migała	3 (42.48)	400
10	(Canada) Jeffrey Adler	3 (34.85)	300	(United Kingdom) Aimee Cringle	3 (42.51)	345
11	(Netherlands) Fabian Hermans	2 (35.40)	210	(United Kingdom) Lucy Campbell	2 (41.85)	365
12	(Brazil) Guilherme Malheiros	2 (35.50)	260	(Australia) Madeline Sturt	2 (42.08)	235
13	(Germany) Moritz Fiebig	2 (36.09)	235	(United States) Kyra Milligan	2 (43.06)	295
14	(United Kingdom) Harry Lightfoot	2 (37.75)	245	(Canada) Emily Rolfe	2 (45.92)	225
15	(United States) Nate Ackermann	2 (37.89)	125	(United States) Danielle Brandon	2 (48.74)	155
16	(United States) Chandler Smith	1 (39.18)	220	(Italy) Elisa Fuliano	1 (44.24)	205
17	(United States) Saxon Panchik	1 (42.23)	135	(Canada) Carolyne Prevost	1 (45.05)	145
18	(United States) Chris Ibarra	1 (45.28)	215	(United States) Abigail Domit	1 (45.05)	170
19	(United States) Colten Mertens	1 (46.28)	300	(Albania) Siria Meha	1 (45.05)	170
20				(United States) Paige Rodgers	1 (47.33)	105

=== Event 6: Orlando ===
- 10 Axle Clean and Jerk (205/150)
- 15 Ring Muscle Up
- 10 Axle Clean and Jerk (205/150)
- 15 Log Muscle Up
- 10 Axle Clean and Jerk (205/150)

Time cap: 12 minutes

#	Men	Time	Pts Total	Women	Time	Pts Total
1	(Australia) Ricky Garard	06:37.77	415	(United States) Alex Gazan	08:04.25	440
2	(Canada) Jeffrey Adler	06:49.34	395	(United Kingdom) Aimee Cringle	08:31.70	440
3	(Brazil) Guilherme Malheiros	06:49.52	350	(United States) Abigail Domit	08:40.02	260
4	(United States) Dallin Pepper	07:00.80	485	(Canada) Emma Lawson	08:43.53	420
5	(Australia) Jay Crouch	07:09.90	455	(Hungary) Laura Horvath	08:54.45	405
6	(United States) James Sprague	07:13.32	445	(United Kingdom) Lucy Campbell	09:09.14	440
7	(New Zealand) Bayley Martin	07:18.45	380	(United States) Paige Rodgers	09:14.30	175
8	(United States) Tudor Magda	07:39.56	430	(Italy) Elisa Fuliano	09:16.78	270
9	(United States) Chris Ibarra	07:40.84	275	(United States) Olivia Kerstetter	09:32.57	370
10	(United States) Colten Mertens	07:53.62	355	(United States) Kyra Milligan	09:49.29	350
11	(United States) Nate Ackermann	08:10.63	175	(Sweden) Emma Tall	09:59.45	380
12	(United States) Chandler Smith	08:19.22	265	(Poland) Gabriela Migała	10:16.76	445
13	(Netherlands) Fabian Hermans	08:24.90	250	(Australia) Madeline Sturt	10:21.16	275
14	(United States) Saxon Panchik	08:39.09	170	(United States) Danielle Brandon	10:35.70	190
15	(United Kingdom) Harry Lightfoot	08:40.65	275	(United States) Arielle Loewen	11:39.40	260
16	(United States) Jayson Hopper	08:59.80	390	(Scotland) Jennifer Muir	CAP+3	305
17	(Australia) Isaac Newman	08:59.80	260	(Canada) Carolyne Prevost	CAP+9	165
18	(Finland) Henrik Haapalainen	09:20.24	260	(Albania) Siria Meha	CAP+13	185
19	(Germany) Moritz Fiebig	CAP+4	245	(United States) Dani Speegle	CAP+14	275
20				(Canada) Emily Rolfe	CAP+15	225

=== Event 7: Pulling Power ===
- 3 Rope Climb
- 12 OHS (225/175)
- 12 Deadlift (275/195)
- 3 Rope Climb
- 9 OHS (225/175)
- 9 DL (315/225)
- 3 Rope Climb
- 6 OHS (225/175)
- 6 DL (385/270)
- 3 Rope Climb
- 3 OHS (225/175)
- 3 DL (405/285)

Time cap: 13 minutes

#	Men	Time	Pts Total	Women	Time	Pts Total
1	(Brazil) Guilherme Malheiros	08:15.10	450	(Hungary) Laura Horvath	09:40.65	505
2	(United States) Nate Ackermann	08:25.00	270	(Poland) Gabriela Migała	09:55.37	540
3	(United States) Tudor Magda	08:35.16	520	(United States) Olivia Kerstetter	10:53.04	460
4	(United States) Dallin Pepper	08:52.33	570	(United Kingdom) Lucy Campbell	11:29.66	525
5	(United States) James Sprague	08:56.91	525	(United States) Kyra Milligan	12:06.96	430
6	(Australia) Jay Crouch	09:03.54	530	(Sweden) Emma Tall	12:32.85	455
7	(United States) Jayson Hopper	09:11.46	460	(Italy) Elisa Fuliano	12:39.38	340
8	(Canada) Jeffrey Adler	09:26.07	460	(United States) Dani Speegle	12:40.98	340
9	(United States) Chandler Smith	08:19.22	325	(Canada) Emma Lawson	12:59.30	480
10	(New Zealand) Bayley Martin	10:03.98	435	(Canada) Emily Rolfe	CAP+3	280
11	(Australia) Ricky Garard	10:09.50	465	(United States) Alex Gazan	CAP+3	490
12	(Netherlands) Fabian Hermans	10:14.79	295	(United States) Paige Rodgers	CAP+3	220
13	(Finland) Henrik Haapalainen	10:28.59	300	(United Kingdom) Aimee Cringle	CAP+3	480
14	(United States) Colten Mertens	10:33.40	390	(Canada) Carolyne Prevost	CAP+3	200
15	(United States) Chris Ibarra	10:35.87	305	(United States) Abigail Domit	CAP+6	290
16	(United States) Saxon Panchik	10:38.24	195	(United States) Arielle Loewen	CAP+6	285
17	(United Kingdom) Harry Lightfoot	11:07.71	295	(Albania) Siria Meha	CAP+7	205
18	(Germany) Moritz Fiebig	11:18.23	260	(United States) Danielle Brandon	CAP+18	205
19	(Australia) Isaac Newman	12:48.74	270	(Australia) Madeline Sturt	CAP+20	285
20				(Scotland) Jennifer Muir	CAP+21	305

=== Event 8: Dunnottar ===
- 100 ft Hand Stand Walk
- 75 Double Unders
- 25 GHD
- 50 Burpee Box Jump Over
- 25 GHD
- 75 Double Unders
- 100 ft Hand Stand Walk

Time cap: 10 minutes

#	Men	Time	Pts Total	Women	Time	Pts Total
1	(United States) Tudor Magda	07:20.48	620	(United Kingdom) Lucy Campbell	07:29.16	625
2	(United States) James Sprague	07:21.14	620	(Canada) Emma Lawson	07:31.49	575
3	(Australia) Jay Crouch	07:23.95	620	(United States) Arielle Loewen	07:37.49	375
4	(United States) Dallin Pepper	07:32.60	655	(United States) Danielle Brandon	07:42.05	290
5	(United States) Nate Ackermann	07:38.56	350	(Hungary) Laura Horvath	07:45.55	585
6	(New Zealand) Bayley Martin	07:39.78	510	(United Kingdom) Aimee Cringle	07:46.56	555
7	(United Kingdom) Harry Lightfoot	07:42.85	365	(United States) Paige Rodgers	07:56.06	290
8	(Australia) Ricky Garard	07:51.61	530	(Poland) Gabriela Migała	08:03.62	605
9	(Australia) Isaac Newman	07:52.83	330	(United States) Olivia Kerstetter	08:06.63	520
10	(Brazil) Guilherme Malheiros	07:53.79	505	(United States) Alex Gazan	08:11.76	545
11	(Canada) Jeffrey Adler	08:06.95	510	(Italy) Elisa Fuliano	08:11.94	390
12	(United States) Chandler Smith	08:07.05	370	(United States) Abigail Domit	08:19.33	335
13	(Finland) Henrik Haapalainen	08:09.56	340	(United States) Kyra Milligan	08:29.79	470
14	(United States) Jayson Hopper	08:17.89	495	(Albania) Siria Meha	08:33.60	240
15	(United States) Saxon Panchik	08:22.34	225	(United States) Dani Speegle	08:39.04	370
16	(United States) Chris Ibarra	08:27.08	330	(Australia) Madeline Sturt	08:41.05	310
17	(Germany) Moritz Fiebig	08:28.09	280	(Canada) Emily Rolfe	08:48.22	300
18	(United States) Colten Mertens	09:06.01	405	(Sweden) Emma Tall	08:53.58	470
19	(Netherlands) Fabian Hermans	09:57.90	305	(Canada) Carolyne Prevost	09:16.40	210
20				(Scotland) Jennifer Muir	CAP+1	305

=== Event 9: Highland Sprint ===
3 rounds:

- 20 Calorie Echo Bike
- 40ft Zercher Lunge (175lbs M, 115klbs F)
- Bag Toss (43lbs M, 30lbs F) - 3 first round, 2 second round, 1 last round

Time Cap: 10 minutes

#	Men	Time	Pts Total	Women	Time	Pts Total
1	(United States) James Sprague	06:33.32	720	(Hungary) Laura Horvath	07:16.29	685
2	(United States) Dallin Pepper	06:45.79	750	(United States) Olivia Kerstetter	07:27.10	615
3	(United States) Jayson Hopper	07:04.03	585	(Sweden) Emma Tall	07:33.53	560
4	(Brazil) Guilherme Malheiros	07:14.69	590	(United Kingdom) Lucy Campbell	07:34.29	710
5	(Australia) Ricky Garard	07:24.17	610	(Poland) Gabriela Migała	08:03.12	685
6	(Australia) Isaac Newman	07:30.99	405	(United States) Alex Gazan	08:12.00	620
7	(New Zealand) Bayley Martin	07:38.07	580	(Canada) Emily Rolfe	08:14.01	370
8	(United States) Tudor Magda	07:38.28	685	(Canada) Emma Lawson	08:14.06	640
9	(Finland) Henrik Haapalainen	07:39.53	400	(United States) Dani Speegle	08:15.67	430
10	(Canada) Jeffrey Adler	07:50.18	565	(Albania) Siria Meha	08:22.12	295
11	(Australia) Jay Crouch	08:11.03	670	(Scotland) Jennifer Muir	08:26.44	355
12	(United States) Nate Ackermann	08:26.55	395	(United States) Danielle Brandon	08:27.63	335
13	(Germany) Moritz Fiebig	09:30.16	320	(United States) Abigail Domit	08:27.98	375
14	(Netherlands) Fabian Hermans	CAP+0	340	(United States) Arielle Loewen	08:39.36	410
15	(United States) Saxon Panchik	CAP+2	255	(United States) Kyra Milligan	08:57.71	500
16	(United States) Chandler Smith	CAP+2	395	(United States) Paige Rodgers	09:01.72	315
17	(United Kingdom) Harry Lightfoot	CAP+3	385	(Australia) Madeline Sturt	09:14.02	330
18	(United States) Chris Ibarra	CAP+6	345	(Canada) Carolyne Prevost	09:37.79	225
19	(United States) Colten Mertens	CAP+30	415	(Italy) Elisa Fuliano	09:53.80	400
20				(United Kingdom) Aimee Cringle	CAP+1	555

=== Final standings ===
Men
#	Name	Pts
1	(United States) Dallin Pepper	750
2	(United States) James Sprague	720
3	(United States) Tudor Magda	685
4	(Australia) Jay Crouch	670
5	(Australia) Ricky Garard	610
6	(Brazil) Guilherme Malheiros	590
7	(United States) Jayson Hopper	585
8	(New Zealand) Bayley Martin	580
9	(Canada) Jeffrey Adler	565
10	(United States) Colten Mertens	415
11	(Australia) Isaac Newman	405
12	(Finland) Henrik Haapalainen	400
13	(United States) Nate Ackermann	395
14	(United States) Chandler Smith	395
15	(United Kingdom) Harry Lightfoot	385
16	(United States) Chris Ibarra	345
17	(Netherlands) Fabian Hermans	340
18	(Germany) Moritz Fiebig	320
19	(United States) Saxon Panchik	255

Women
#	Name	Pts
1	(United Kingdom) Lucy Campbell	710
2	(Hungary) Laura Horvath	685
3	(Poland) Gabriela Migała	685
4	(Canada) Emma Lawson	640
5	(United States) Alex Gazan	620
6	(United States) Olivia Kerstetter	615
7	(Sweden) Emma Tall	560
8	(United Kingdom) Aimee Cringle	555
9	(United States) Kyra Milligan	500
10	(United States) Dani Speegle	430
11	(United States) Arielle Loewen	410
12	(Italy) Elisa Fuliano	400
13	(United States) Abigail Domit	375
14	(Canada) Emily Rolfe	370
15	(Scotland) Jennifer Muir	355
16	(United States) Danielle Brandon	335
17	(Australia) Madeline Sturt	330
18	(United States) Paige Rodgers	315
19	(Albania) Siria Meha	295
20	(Canada) Carolyne Prevost	225

== Strongman and strongwoman ==
=== Event 1: Deadlift Ladder ===
- Men's format: Athletes attempt to lift increasingly heavier deadlifts weighing 318 kg (700 lb), 340 kg (750 lb), 363 kg (800 lb) and 318 kg (850 lb) they then complete as many repetitions as possible on the 318 kg (850 lb) bar.
- Women's format: Athletes have to complete increasingly heavier deadlifts weighing 190 kg (420 lb), 218 kg (460 lb), 227 kg (500 lb) and 245 kg (540 lb) they then complete as many repetitions as possible on the 245 kg (540 lb) bar.
- Time limit: 1 minute 30 seconds

Men					Women				
Place	Athlete	Score	Event points	Overall points	Place	Athlete	Score	Event points	Overall points
1	(Latvia) Martins Licis	6 in 42.83 s	10	10	1	(United Kingdom) Lucy Underdown	13 in 1 m 28.00 s	10	10
2	(South Africa) Rayno Nel	6 in 55.90 s	9	9	2	(United States) Jennifer Lyle	9 in 1 m 18.81 s	9	9
3	(United Kingdom) Paddy Haynes	6 in 1 m 6.40 s	8	8	3	(United States) Angelica Jardine	9 in 1 m 28.56 s	8	8
4	(Canada) Mitchell Hooper	5 in 52.53 s	7	7	4	(United Kingdom) Andrea Thompson	7 in 1 m 15.52 s	7	7
5	(United States) Trey Mitchell	5 in 56.09 s	6	6	5	(United Kingdom) Grace Hilbourne	7 in 1 m 27.00 s	6	6
6	(United States) Austin Andrade	5 in 1m 9.08 s	5	5	6	(United Kingdom) Rebecca Roberts	6 in 1 m 30.00 s	5	5
7	(Czech Republic) Ondřej Fojtů	4 in 37.09 s	4	4	7	(Canada) Jackie Osczevski	4 in 57.90 s	4	4
8	(United States) Thomas Evans	4 in 47.95 s	3	3	8	(Puerto Rico) Inez Carrasquillo	3 in 28.06 s	3	3
9	(Ukraine) Pavlo Kordiyaka	2 in 21.06 s	2	2	9	(Australia) Katie Blunden	1 in 14.28 s	2	2

=== Event 2: Viking Press ===
- Men's format: Athletes attempt to lift a 181 kg (400 lb) viking press for as many repetitions as possible.
- Women's format: Athletes attempt to lift a 102 kg (225 lb) viking press for as many repetitions as possible.
- Time limit: 1 minute

Men					Women				
Place	Athlete	Repetitions	Event points	Overall points	Place	Athlete	Repetitions	Event points	Overall points
1	(United States) Trey Mitchell	15 in 53.82 s	10	16	1	(Puerto Rico) Inez Carrasquillo	23 in 55.76 s	10	13
2	(Czech Republic) Ondřej Fojtů	15 in 59.99 s	9	13	2	(United Kingdom) Andrea Thompson	17 in 59.07 s	9	16
3	(Canada) Mitchell Hooper	13 in 53.36 s	8	15	3	(United States) Angelica Jardine	16 in 57.94 s	8	16
4	(Latvia) Martins Licis	11 in 51.83 s	7	17	4	(United Kingdom) Lucy Underdown	15 in 57.69 s	7	17
5	(United States) Thomas Evans	10 in 44.07 s	6	9	5	(United Kingdom) Rebecca Roberts	15 in 1m 00 s	6	11
6	(Ukraine) Pavlo Kordiyaka	8 in 46.74 s	5	7	6	(United Kingdom) Grace Hilbourne	9 in 24.30 s	5	11
7	(United States) Austin Andrade	7 in 53.71 s	4	9	7	(United States) Jennifer Lyle	9 in 47.15 s	4	13
8	(South Africa) Rayno Nel	2 in 5.65 s	3	12	8	(Canada) Jackie Osczevski	7 in 42.71 s	3	7
9	(United Kingdom) Paddy Haynes	1 in 5.05 s	2	10	9	(Australia) Katie Blunden	(no lift)	0	2

=== Event 3: Conan's Wheel ===
- Men's format: Athletes attempt to lift and carry a 261 kg (575 lb) conan's wheel for the furthest distance without dropping.
- Women's format: Athletes attempt to lift and carry a 189 kg (420 lb) conan's wheel for the furthest distance without dropping.

Men					Women				
Place	Athlete	Degrees/ Rotations	Event points	Overall points	Place	Athlete	Degrees/ Rotations	Event points	Overall points
1	(United Kingdom) Paddy Haynes	899 °	10	20	1	(Puerto Rico) Inez Carrasquillo	991 °	10	23
2	(South Africa) Rayno Nel	869 °	9	21	2	(United States) Angelica Jardine	797 °	9	25
3	(Canada) Mitchell Hooper	837 °	8	23	3	(United Kingdom) Rebecca Roberts	524 °	8	19
4	(Ukraine) Pavlo Kordiyaka	772 °	7	14	4	(United Kingdom) Lucy Underdown	509 °	7	24
5	(Czech Republic) Ondřej Fojtů	739 °	6	19	5	(Australia) Katie Blunden	446 °	6	10
6	(Latvia) Martins Licis	464 °	5	22	6	(Canada) Jackie Osczevski	379 °	5	12
7	(United States) Trey Mitchell	419 °	4	20	7	(United States) Jennifer Lyle	321 °	4	17
8	(United States) Thomas Evans	366 °	2.5	11.5	8	(United Kingdom) Andrea Thompson	281 °	3	19
8	(United States) Austin Andrade	366 °	2.5	11.5	—	(United Kingdom) Grace Hilbourne	—	—	11

=== Event 4: Yoke Carry and Log Lift Medley ===
- Men's format: Athletes attempt to lift and carry a 476 kg (1050 lb) yoke for 15 m (49 ft) then lift a 165 kg (364 lb) for as many repetitions as possible.
- Women's format: Athletes attempt to lift and carry a 295 kg (650 lb) yoke for 15 m (49 ft) then lift a 110 kg (242 lb) for as many repetitions as possible.
- Time limit: 2 minutes

Men					Women				
Place	Athlete	Score	Event points	Overall points	Place	Athlete	Score	Event points	Overall points
1	(United States) Trey Mitchell	8 in 1 m 52.16 s	10	30	1	(Puerto Rico) Inez Carrasquillo	8 in 1m 39.10 s	10	33
2	(Czech Republic) Ondřej Fojtů	7 in 1 m 58.47 s	9	28	2	(United States) Angelica Jardine	6 in 1 m 51.80 s	9	34
3	(United States) Thomas Evans	5 reps	8	19.5	3	(United Kingdom) Andrea Thompson	5 in 1 m 56.58 s	8	27
4	(United States) Austin Andrade	5 in 1 m 52.01 s	7	18.5	4	(United States) Jennifer Lyle	5 in 1 m 56.76 s	7	24
5	(Latvia) Martins Licis	5 in 1 m 56.59 s	6	28	5	(United Kingdom) Lucy Underdown	3 in 1 m 44.35 s	6	30
6	(Ukraine) Pavlo Kordiyaka	4 in 1 m 46.91 s	5	19	6	(United Kingdom) Rebecca Roberts	3 in 1 m 50.88 s	5	24
7	(South Africa) Rayno Nel	3 in 55.58 s	4	25	7	(Canada) Jackie Osczevski	1 in 19.14 s	4	16
8	(Canada) Mitchell Hooper	3 in 1 m 17.50 s	3	26	8	(Australia) Katie Blunden	1 in 27.73 s	3	13
9	(United Kingdom) Paddy Haynes	1 in 31.27 s	2	22	—	(United Kingdom) Grace Hilbourne	—	—	11

=== Event 5: Grip Medley ===
- Men's format: Athletes attempt to duck walk a 261 kg (575 lb) implement for 6 m (20 ft) then farmers walk carry a 160 kg (353 lb) implement for 12 metres (39 ft) then load 147 kg (324 lb), 160 kg (353 lb), 170 kg (375 lb) sandbags.
- Women's format: Athletes attempt to duck walk a 125 kg (275 lb) implement for 6 m (20 ft) then farmers walk carry a 102 kg (225 lb) implement for 12 metres (39 ft) then load 91 kg (200 lb), 100 kg (220 lb), 109 kg (240 lb) sandbags.
- Time limit: 2 minutes

Men					Women				
Place	Athlete	Time	Event points	Overall points	Place	Athlete	Time	Event points	Overall points
1	(South Africa) Rayno Nel	5 in 40.79 s	10	35	1	(Puerto Rico) Inez Carrasquillo	5 in 33.61 s	10	43
2	(Latvia) Martins Licis	5 in 47.78 s	9	37	2	(United States) Angelica Jardine	5 in 43.31 s	9	43
3	(Ukraine) Pavlo Kordiyaka	5 in 49.65 s	8	27	3	(United Kingdom) Lucy Underdown	5 in 43.51 s	8	38
4	(United Kingdom) Paddy Haynes	5 in 56.00 s	7	29	4	(Canada) Jackie Osczevski	5 in 48.25 s	7	23
5	(United States) Trey Mitchell	5 in 56.46 s	6	36	5	(United Kingdom) Rebecca Roberts	5 in 1 m 0.41 s	6	30
6	(Canada) Mitchell Hooper	5 in 57.28 s	5	31	6	(United States) Jennifer Lyle	4 in 33.00 s	5	29
7	(United States) Austin Andrade	5 in 1m 22.16 s	4	22.5	7	(United Kingdom) Andrea Thompson	3 in 40.20 s	4	31
8	(Czech Republic) Ondřej Fojtů	4 in 35.00 s	3	31	8	(Australia) Katie Blunden	3 in 1 m 54.84 s	3	16
9	(United States) Thomas Evans	4 in 37.36 s	2	21.5	—	(United Kingdom) Grace Hilbourne	—	—	11

=== Event 6: Mons Megs Stones ===
- Men's format: Athletes attempt to lift 4 stones weighing 136 kg (300 lb), 159 kg (350 lb), 181 kg (400 lb) and 200 kg (440 lb) in the fastest time possible.
- Women's format: Athletes attempt to lift 4 stones weighing 102 kg (225 lb), 115 kg (255 lb), 129 kg (285 lb) and 136 kg (300 lb) in the fastest time possible.
- Time limit: 1 minute 15 seconds

Men					Women				
Place	Athlete	Time	Event points	Overall points	Place	Athlete	Time	Event points	Overall points
1	(United States) Trey Mitchell	4 in 30.44 s	10	46	1	(United States) Angelica Jardine	4 in 26.85 s	10	53
2	(South Africa) Rayno Nel	4 in 39.94 s	9	44	2	(Puerto Rico) Inez Carrasquillo	4 in 35.31 s	9	52
3	(Latvia) Martins Licis	3 in 20.53 s	8	45	3	(United Kingdom) Rebecca Roberts	4 in 38.68 s	8	38
4	(United Kingdom) Paddy Haynes	3 in 23.31 s	7	36	4	(United States) Jennifer Lyle	3 in 26.19 s	7	36
5	(Czech Republic) Ondřej Fojtů	3 in 29.77 s	6	37	5	(Australia) Katie Blunden	3 in 33.06 s	6	20
6	(United States) Thomas Evans	3 in 35.36 s	5	26.5	6	(Canada) Jackie Osczevski	3 in 44.44 s	5	28
7	(United States) Austin Andrade	3 in 51.80 s	4	26.5	7	(United Kingdom) Lucy Underdown	2 in 18.10 s	4	42
8	(Ukraine) Pavlo Kordiyaka	2 in 13.79 s	3	30	8	(United Kingdom) Andrea Thompson	1 in 21.03 s	3	34
9	(Canada) Mitchell Hooper	2 in 19.76 s	2	33	—	(United Kingdom) Grace Hilbourne	—	—	11

=== Final standings ===
Men
Place	Athlete	Points
1st place, gold medalist(s)	(United States) Trey Mitchell	46
2nd place, silver medalist(s)	(Latvia) Martins Licis	45
3rd place, bronze medalist(s)	(South Africa) Rayno Nel	44
4	(Czech Republic) Ondřej Fojtů	37
5	(United Kingdom) Paddy Haynes	36
6	(Canada) Mitchell Hooper	33
7	(Ukraine) Pavlo Kordiyaka	30
8	(United States) Austin Andrade	26.5
8	(United States) Thomas Evans	26.5

Women
Place	Athlete	Points
1st place, gold medalist(s)	(United States) Angelica Jardine	53
2nd place, silver medalist(s)	(Puerto Rico) Inez Carrasquillo	52
3rd place, bronze medalist(s)	(United Kingdom) Lucy Underdown	42
4	(United Kingdom) Rebecca Roberts	38
5	(United States) Jennifer Lyle	36
6	(United Kingdom) Andrea Thompson	34
7	(Canada) Jackie Osczevski	28
8	(Australia) Katie Blunden	20
9	(United Kingdom) Grace Hilbourne	11
