= Aimee Cringle =

British CrossFit athlete

Personal information
- Born: May 24, 1999 (age 27) Isle of Man
- Occupation: CrossFit Athlete
- Height: 167 cm (5 ft 6 in)
- Weight: 67 kg (148 lb)

Sport
- Sport: CrossFit
- Coached by: Fraser Mckenzie
Medal record
Representing United Kingdom
CrossFit Games
Gold medal – first place	2026	Women

Aimee Cringle (born May 24, 1999) is a British CrossFit athlete from the Isle of Man. She is the winner of the 2026 CrossFit Games.

== Early life ==
Aimee Cringle grew up in Glen Maye in the Isle of Man. She learned gymnastics when she was four. She joined an athletic club when she was five, and become a track and field athlete with focus on long jump, 100m, 200, and 400m, competing in athletics for a number of years. She started taking CrossFit classes in 2014 initially for fun and to strengthen her body for athletics, but became more interested in CrossFit itself. She attended Queen Elizabeth II High School in Peel, Isle of Man. She took a three-year nursing course at the University College Isle of Man and graduated in October 2021 as a qualified nurse. After qualifying as a nurse, she put her nursing career on hold while she trained full time as a CrossFit athlete when she was 22.

== Career ==
=== Athletics ===
Cringle has competed for the Isla of Man in a number of competitions. In 2019, she won two gold medals at the Island Games in Gibraltar – she won the 400m women's hurdles breaking a longstanding Isle of Man record, and as part of 4 x 400m women's relay team. She also competed in long jump but finished fourth. In 2020 she won the Isle of Man Triathlon Championship.

=== Crossfit ===
Cringle started taking part in the CrossFit Open in 2018 when she was 19. She won the European CrossFit Championships in 2021.

Cringle qualified for her first Games in 2024, and finished at No. 13. She was named Rookie of the Year.

At her second CrossFit Games in 2025 in Albany, New York, Cringle had her best result yet in an event in Run Row Run when she finished second behind Tia Clair Toomey. She improved her final ranking to eighth. Cringle finished second in the inaugural World Fitness Project season in 2025.

At the 2026 CrossFit Games, Cringle had her first event win in the Ranch 7200. She registered four more wins, most notably at the Triple Pig event which featured two new movements – GHD wall-balls and triple-unders. She won the Games with a dominant performance, earning 136 points ahead of the second placed competitor.

== CrossFit Games results ==
Year	Games	Semifinal	Quarterfinal	Open
2018				5,446th (Worldwide)
2019				937th (Worldwide)
2020				425th (Worldwide)
2021		15th (Lowlands Throwdown) (team)	440th (worldwide); 100th (Europe)	244th (Worldwide); 73rd (Europe)
2022		12th (Strength in Depth)	86th (Worldwide); 32nd (Europe)	32nd (Worldwide); 12th (Europe)
2023		19th (Europe Semifinal)	45th (Worldwide); 17th (Europe)	50th (Worldwide); 14th (Europe)
2024	13th	5th (French Throwdown)	19th (Worldwide) 11th (Europe)	10th (Worldwide) 4th (Europe)
2025	8th	9th (In-Affiliate Semifinals)	—N/a	14th (Worldwide) 10th (Europe)
2026	1st	2nd (French Throwdown)	18th (Worldwide); 8th (Europe)	12th (Worldwide) 9th (Europe)
