= 2026 CrossFit Games =

Athletic competition

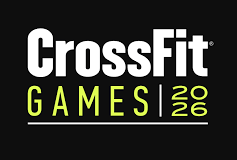
- Venue: SAP Center
- Location: San Jose, California, USA
- Dates: July 22–26, 2026

Champions
- Men: (United States) James Sprague
- Women: (United Kingdom) Aimee Cringle
- Team: (United States) CrossFit Whip

The 2026 CrossFit Games are the 20th edition of the competition in the sport of CrossFit that took place from July 22 to 26, 2026, in San Jose. James Sprague was the men's champion, with Aimee Cringle winning the women's division, and CrossFit Whip the teams'.

For its 20th anniversary, the CrossFit Games returned to California. The early events in the first day were held at the ranch where the inaugural Games was held, while in the rest of the week the competition was held at the SAP Center. This year 20 scored events were held, the most for any Games.

The quarterfinals, which were removed in 2025, were restored for this season. The prize money this year again comes from 50% of the Open entry fees, with the individual winners expected to take home $297,469 each.

== Qualifications ==
=== Open ===
The first qualifying stage of CrossFit Games, the Open, started on February 26, 2026. Three workouts will be held over three weeks, with the last workout ending on March 16.

- 26.1 – For time: 20 x Wall Ball Shots; 18 x Box Jump Overs; 30 x Wall Ball Shots; 18 x Box Jump Overs; 40 x Wall Ball Shots; 18 x Medicine Ball Box Step Overs; 66 x Wall Ball Shots; 18 x Medicine Ball Box Step Overs; 40 x Wall Ball Shots; 18 x Box Jump Overs; 30 x Wall Ball Shots; 18 x Box Jump Overs; 20 x Wall Ball Shots (12 minute cap)
- 26.2 – For time: 80-foot dumbbell overhead walking lunge; 20 alternating dumbbell snatches; 20 pull-ups; 80-foot dumbbell overhead walking lunge; 20 alternating dumbbell snatches; 20 chest-to-bar pull-ups; 80-foot dumbbell overhead walking lunge; 20 alternating dumbbell snatches; 20 ring muscle-ups (15 minute time cap)
- 26.3 – For time: (2 Rounds) 12 Burpees Over Bar, 12 Cleans (65lb/95lb), 12 Thrusters; (2 Rounds) 12 Burpees Over Bar, 12 Cleans (75lb/115lb), 12 Thrusters; (2 Rounds) 12 Burpees Over Bar, 12 Cleans (85lb/135lb), 12 Thrusters (16 minute cap)

Around 254,000 athletes registered for the Open, an increase of around 8.1% from 2025. The CrossFit Open was won by Colten Mertens for the men's division and Lucy Campbell for the women's.

The top 25% of the individual and age group competitors proceeded to the Quarterfinals. This was an increase from the top 10% of 2024.

=== Quarterfinals ===
The quarterfinals are held from March 26 to 30, 2026. Four workouts were released, and individual and age-group athletes are required to perform the workouts over five days in affiliates with a registered judge. Kyra Milligan and Austin Hatfield were the winners of the quarterfinals.

The top 2,000 competitors advance to the Semifinals.

=== Semifinals ===
The Semifinals was held from April to June. Top qualifiers from individual and age group divisions in the Quarterfinals, as well as teams from the Open, can compete in the Semifinals.

== Qualifiers ==
For the second year, the number of qualifiers for the individuals competitions has been set at 30 men and 30 women. For the teams the number also remains at 20.

=== Individuals ===
Qualifiers from the In-Affiliate Semifinals and 10 In-Person Qualifying Events:

Mayhem Classic (April 17–19) Tennessee, United States		Legends Championship (April 24–26) California, United States		Copa Sur (May 1–3) Santa Catarina, Brazil	
Men	Women	Men	Women	Men	Women
(France) Victor Hoffer (Russia) Roman Khrennikov (Canada) Jeffrey Adler	(United States) Paige Rodgers (Canada) Emma Lawson (United Kingdom) Lucy Campbell	(United States) Dallin Pepper (United States) James Sprague	(United States) Olivia Kerstetter (United States) Abigail Domit	(Brazil) Kalyan Souza (Chile) Benjamín Reyes	(Canada) Anikha Greer (United States) Miley Wade

Far East Throwdown (May 1 – 3) Busan, South Korea		French Throwdown (May 15–17) Paris, France		Rebel Renegade Games (May 21– 24) Johannesburg, South Africa	
Men	Women	Men	Women	Men	Women
(Finland) Henrik Haapalainen	(Albania) Siria Meha	(United States) Jayson Hopper (Germany) Moritz Fiebig (Georgia (country)) Nika Maisuradze	(Switzerland) Mirjam Von Rohr (United Kingdom) Aimee Cringle (Italy) Elisa Fuliano	(New Zealand) Ben Fowler	(United States) Hannah Black

Torian Pro (May 22– 24) Brisbane, Australia		Syndicate Crown (May 29 – 31) Tennessee, United States		MAD Fitness Festival (May 29 – 31) Ciudad Real, Spain	
Men	Women	Men	Women	Men	Women
(Australia) Ricky Garard (Australia) Jay Crouch (New Zealand) Bayley Martin	(Australia) Madeline Sturt (Australia) Ellie Turner (United States) Kyra Milligan	(United States) Saxon Panchik (United States) Ty Jenkins (United States) Austin Hatfield	(United States) Lydia Fish (United States) Haley Adams (United States) Danielle Brandon	(Spain) Aniol Ekai (Spain) Luis Cuellar (Spain) Calum Clements	(Poland) ~~Gabriela Migała~~ (Note: Gabriela Migała withdraws from 2026 CrossFit Games.) (Switzerland) Aline Wirz (Note: Aline Wirz accepts replacement invite for Gabriela Migała.) (Republic of Ireland) Lucy McGonigle (United Kingdom) Ella Wilkinson

Northern California Classic (May 29–31) California, United States		Individual Online Semifinals (June 11–15)			
Men	Women	Men		Women	
(United States) Tudor Magda (United States) Dylan Hamming	(United States) Alex Gazan (United States) Rachel Noel	(Brazil) Guilherme Malheiros (United States) Quinn Robinson (United States) Nick Mathew (United States) Justin Medeiros	(United States) Spencer Panchik (United States) Colten Mertens (Canada) Patrick Vellner	(United States) Alexis Raptis (Canada) Erica Folo (United States) Arielle Loewen (Norway) Matilde Ǿyen Garnes	(Canada) Janie Cheverie (Iceland) Bergrós Björnsdóttir (Republic of Ireland) Holly Tynan

Representation by Nation
- United States (26)
- Canada (6)
- Australia (4)
- Spain (3)
- United Kingdom (3)
- Brazil (2)
- Ireland (2)
- New Zealand (2)
- Switzerland (2)
- Albania (1)
- Chile (1)
- Finland (1)
- France (1)
- Georgia (1)
- Germany (1)
- Iceland (1)
- Italy (1)
- Norway (1)
- Russia (1)

=== Teams ===
In 2026, 13 teams can qualify via in-person Semifinals and 7 via online Semifinals. A total of 20 teams will qualify for the finals

Copa Sur (May 1–3) Santa Catarina, Brazil	Far East Throwdown (May 1 – 3) Busan, South Korea	French Throwdown (May 15–17) Paris, France	Torian Pro (May 22– 24) Brisbane, Australia
(United States) Hendersonville Mayhem	(United Kingdom) CrossFit Aylesbury	(Norway) CrossFit Oslo Kriger (Sweden) CrossFit Södra Wättern (Denmark) Butcher's Lab Pursuit	(Australia) Homefront CrossFit PRVN (Australia) Snake CrossFit HWPO (New Zealand) Kia Maia Mahi Dawgs

Rebel Renegade Games (May 21– 24) Johannesburg, South Africa	Syndicate Crown (May 29 – 31) Tennessee, United States	MAD Fitness Festival (May 29 – 31) Ciudad Real, Spain	Team Online Semifinals (June 4–8)	
(South Africa) CrossFit Uncontained II Relentless	(United States) CrossFit Mayhem (United States) CrossFit WHIP (United States) Camp Rhino CrossFit	(Norway) CrossFit Asker Kriger	(United States) Solidarity CrossFit Basecamp (United States) CrossFit Body Blueprint (United States) CrossFit Fort Vancouver (United Kingdom) Blueprint CrossFit AOD	(Argentina) Q21 CrossFit (Iceland) CrossFit Reykjavík (United States) CrossFit 1124

Representation by Nation
- United States (8)
- Australia (2)
- Norway (2)
- United Kingdom (2)
- Argentina (1)
- Denmark (1)
- Iceland (1)
- New Zealand (1)
- South Africa (1)
- Sweden (1)

== Individuals ==
In order to mark the 20th anniversary of the CrossFit Games, the Games returned to California where it started. The number of scored events has been increased to 20. The first workout from the inaugural 2007 CrossFit Games, The Hopper, was repeated. Swimming also returned to the Games following two years' absence due to the 2024 tragedy.

=== Event 1: 2007 Hopper ===
- 1,000-meter row

Then, 5 rounds:

- 25 pull-ups
- 7 push jerks

F: 85 lb; M: 135 lb

Time cap: Women: 12 min.; Men: 11 min.

#	Men	Time	Pts Total	Women	Time	Pts Total
1	(Australia) Jay Crouch	7:11	100	(Australia) Madeline Sturt	8:03	100
2	(United States) Colton Mertens	7:17	96	(United Kingdom) Lucy Campbell	8:10	96
3	(United States) Saxon Panchik	7:19	92	(Switzerland) Aline Wirz	8:16	92
4	(Spain) Calum Clements	7:34	88	(United States) Haley Adams	8:22	88
5	(United States) James Sprague	7:37	84	(United States) Danielle Brandon	8:26	84
6	(United States) Justin Medeiros	7:36	80	(United States) Arielle Loewen	8:31	80
7	(Germany) Moritz Fiebig	7:41	76	(Canada) Emma Lawson	8:35	76
8	(Australia) Ricky Garard	7:47.54	72	(United States) Kyra Milligan	8:37	72
9	(Canada) Jeffrey Adler	7:47.89	68	(Iceland) Bergrós Björnsdóttir	8:40	68
10	(New Zealand) Bayley Martin	7:49	64	(United Kingdom) Aimee Cringle	8:40	64
11	(United States) Austin Hatfield	7:49.09	60	(Australia) Ellie Turner	8:49	60
12	(United States) Jayson Hopper	7:55	56	(United States) Alex Gazan	8:54	56
13	(United States) Spencer Panchik	7:59.43	52	(Italy) Elisa Fuliano	8:55	52
14	(France) Victor Hoffer	8:00.74	48	(Canada) Anikha Greer	8:56	48
15	(Authorised Neutral Athletes) Roman Khrennikov	8:01	45	(United States) Alexis Raptis	8:57	45
16	(United States) Tudor Magda	08:01.20	42	(Republic of Ireland) Lucy McGonigle	8:58	42
17	(United States) Dallin Pepper	8:11	39	(United States) Lydia Fish	9:06	39
18	(Finland) Henrik Haapalainen	8:16	36	(United States) Paige Rodgers	9:07	36
19	(New Zealand) Ben Fowler	8:17	33	(Switzerland) Mirjam Von Rohr	9:09	33
20	(Spain) Aniol Ekai	8:20.49	30	(United Kingdom) Ella Wilkinson	9:13	30
21	(Brazil) Guilherme Malheiros	8:20.87	27	(United States) Miley Wade	9:15	27
22	(Canada) Patrick Vellner	8:21	24	(United States) Abigail Domit	9:17	24
23	(United States) Dylan Hamming	8:24	21	(Norway) Matilde Garnes	9:11	21
24	(Spain) Luis Cuellar	8:24.62	18	(Albania) Siria Meha	9:25	18
25	(Georgia (country)) Nika Maisuradze	8:26	15	(Republic of Ireland) Holly Tynan	9:27	15
26	(Brazil) Kalyan Souza	8:28	12	(United States) Olivia Kerstetter	9:30	12
27	(United States) Ty Jenkins	9:31	9	(Canada) Erica Folo	9:37	9
28	(Chile) Benjamín Reyes	9:31	6	(Canada) Janie Cheverie	9:53	6
29	(United States) Nick Mathew	9:39	3	(United States) Hannah Black	9:58	3
30	(United States) Quinn Robinson	9:45	0	(United States) Rachel Noel	10:03	0

=== Event 2: Ranch 7200 ===
- 7,200-meter trail run

#	Men	Time	Pts Total	Women	Time	Pts Total
1	(Australia) Ricky Garard	39:33	172	(United Kingdom) Aimee Cringle	40:42	164
2	(United States) James Sprague	39:43	180	(United States) Haley Adams	41:15	184
3	(Australia) Jay Crouch	39:52	192	(United Kingdom) Ella Wilkinson	42:16	122
4	(Canada) Jeffrey Adler	40:27	156	(United Kingdom) Lucy Campbell	42:48	184
5	(Authorised Neutral Athletes) Roman Khrennikov	40:42	129	(Australia) Ellie Turner	42:58	144
6	(Georgia (country)) Nika Maisuradze	40:56	95	(Switzerland) Aline Wirz	43:20	172
7	(United States) Austin Hatfield	41:09	136	(United States) Rachel Noel	43:59	76
8	(United States) Justin Medeiros	42:08	152	(United States) Miley Wade	44:07	99
9	(United States) Ty Jenkins	42:43	77	(Australia) Madeline Sturt	44:18	168
10	(United States) Dallin Pepper	42:57	103	(Canada) Emma Lawson	44:21	140
11	(United States) Saxon Panchik	43:00	152	(Canada) Janie Cheverie	45:16	66
12	(Brazil) Kalyan Souza	43:06	68	(Albania) Siria Meha	45:20	74
13	(Spain) Aniol Ekai	43:19	82	(United States) Lydia Fish	45:31	91
14	(Spain) Luis Cuellar	43:30	66	(United States) Danielle Brandon	45:43	132
15	(United States) Quinn Robinson	43:55	45	(Italy) Elisa Fuliano	45:55	97
16	(France) Victor Hoffer	44:31	90	(Switzerland) Mirjam Von Rohr	46:31	75
17	(United States) Dylan Hamming	45:04	60	(Canada) Erica Folo	46:34	48
18	(United States) Jayson Hopper	45:16	92	(United States) Alex Gazan	46:37	92
19	(New Zealand) Bayley Martin	45:19	97	(United States) Abigail Domit	47:20	57
20	(New Zealand) Ben Fowler	45:25	63	(Republic of Ireland) Holly Tynan	48:00	45
21	(Germany) Moritz Fiebig	45:45	103	(United States) Arielle Loewen	48:30	107
22	(Finland) Henrik Haapalainen	46:49	60	(Norway) Matilde Garnes	48:40	45
23	(Canada) Patrick Vellner	47:13	45	(Republic of Ireland) Lucy McGonigle	50:10	63
24	(United States) Nick Mathew	47:51	21	(Iceland) Bergrós Björnsdóttir	51:12	86
25	(Spain) Calum Clements	49:10	103	(United States) Olivia Kerstetter	51:34	27
26	(United States) Spencer Panchik	49:26	64	(United States) Kyra Milligan	52:45	84
27	(Chile) Benjamín Reyes	50:13	15	(United States) Hannah Black	56:39	12
28	(United States) Colton Mertens	51:21	102	(United States) Paige Rodgers	58:35	42
29	(United States) Tudor Magda	52:00	45	(Canada) Anikha Greer	59:58	51
30	(Brazil) Guilherme Malheiros	55:58	27	(United States) Alexis Raptis	59:59	45

=== Event 3–5: The CrossFit Total ===
Each lift was scored separately, each lift scored 50 points.

==== 1-rep-max back squat ====
#	Men	Weight (lb)	Pts Total	Women	Weight (lb)	Pts Total
1	(United States) Colton Mertens	555	152	(United States) Kyra Milligan	370	134
2	(Brazil) Guilherme Malheiros	550	75	(Switzerland) Mirjam Von Rohr	350	123
3	(United States) Austin Hatfield	525	182	(Canada) Anikha Greer	335	97
4	(United States) Nick Mathew	520	65	(United States) Alex Gazan	330	136
5	(New Zealand) Bayley Martin	520	139	(Australia) Madeline Sturt	330	210
6	(United States) Justin Medeiros	505	192	(United States) Hannah Black	330	52
7	(United States) Dallin Pepper	500	141	(Italy) Elisa Fuliano	325	135
8	(Germany) Moritz Fiebig	500	139	(Iceland) Bergrós Björnsdóttir	325	122
9	(United States) Quinn Robinson	500	79	(United States) Olivia Kerstetter	320	61
10	(United States) Tudor Magda	495	77	(Albania) Siria Meha	320	106
11	(Georgia (country)) Nika Maisuradze	495	125	(Canada) Erica Folo	315	78
12	(United States) Spencer Panchik	490	92	(United States) Abigail Domit	315	85
13	(Spain) Aniol Ekai	485	108	(United States) Miley Wade	310	125
14	(Australia) Jay Crouch	485	216	(United States) Paige Rodgers	305	66
15	(France) Victor Hoffer	485	112	(United Kingdom) Lucy Campbell	305	206
16	(Canada) Patrick Vellner	480	65	(Australia) Ellie Turner	305	164
17	(United States) James Sprague	475	198	(United Kingdom) Aimee Cringle	300	182
18	(United States) Jayson Hopper	475	110	(Canada) Emma Lawson	300	156
19	(Canada) Jeffrey Adler	475	170	(Norway) Matilde Garnes	295	59
20	(Authorised Neutral Athletes) Roman Khrennikov	475	141	(United States) Arielle Loewen	295	119
21	(United States) Ty Jenkins	475	87	(Republic of Ireland) Lucy McGonigle	290	73
22	(Spain) Luis Cuellar	475	74	(United Kingdom) Ella Wilkinson	285	130
23	(Finland) Henrik Haapalainen	470	67	(United States) Rachel Noel	285	83
24	(United States) Dylan Hamming	455	66	(Canada) Janie Cheverie	280	72
25	(United States) Saxon Panchik	455	157	(Republic of Ireland) Holly Tynan	275	50
26	(Australia) Ricky Garard	440	176	(United States) Alexis Raptis	275	49
27	(Brazil) Kalyan Souza	440	71	(Switzerland) Aline Wirz	270	175
28	(Chile) Benjamín Reyes	440	17	(United States) Danielle Brandon	260	134
29	(Spain) Calum Clements	435	104	(United States) Haley Adams	255	185
30	(New Zealand) Ben Fowler	425	63	(United States) Lydia Fish	185	91

==== 1-rep-max shoulder press ====
#	Men	Weight (lb)	Pts Total	Women	Weight (lb)	Pts Total
1	(United States) Colton Mertens	260	202	(United States) Alex Gazan	170	186
2	(Australia) Ricky Garard	440	228	(United States) Paige Rodgers	155	114
3	(United States) Dylan Hamming	245	112	(United Kingdom) Aimee Cringle	150	228
4	(Authorised Neutral Athletes) Roman Khrennikov	245	185	(Canada) Anikha Greer	150	141
5	(United States) Dallin Pepper	240	183	(Australia) Ellie Turner	150	206
6	(United States) Tudor Magda	240	119	(United States) Kyra Milligan	145	174
7	(United States) Austin Hatfield	240	220	(Canada) Erica Folo	145	116
8	(Spain) Aniol Ekai	230	144	(United States) Alexis Raptis	145	85
9	(United States) Jayson Hopper	230	144	(United States) Hannah Black	140	86
10	(Germany) Moritz Fiebig	225	171	(United States) Abigail Domit	140	117
11	(Australia) Jay Crouch	225	246	(United States) Arielle Loewen	140	149
12	(France) Victor Hoffer	225	140	(United States) Haley Adams	140	213
13	(Canada) Patrick Vellner	220	91	(United States) Olivia Kerstetter	135	87
14	(New Zealand) Bayley Martin	220	165	(Switzerland) Mirjam Von Rohr	135	147
15	(United States) Ty Jenkins	220	109	(Norway) Matilde Garnes	135	81
16	(Spain) Calum Clements	220	124	(Republic of Ireland) Lucy McGonigle	135	93
17	(Brazil) Guilherme Malheiros	215	93	(Canada) Janie Cheverie	135	90
18	(United States) Nick Mathew	215	81	(Italy) Elisa Fuliano	130	151
19	(Georgia (country)) Nika Maisuradze	215	139	(Republic of Ireland) Holly Tynan	130	64
20	(United States) Quinn Robinson	215	91	(Iceland) Bergrós Björnsdóttir	130	136
21	(Canada) Jeffrey Adler	215	180	(Albania) Siria Meha	130	116
22	(Brazil) Kalyan Souza	215	81	(United Kingdom) Lucy Campbell	130	214
23	(New Zealand) Ben Fowler	215	70	(United States) Miley Wade	130	132
24	(United States) Spencer Panchik	210	98	(Canada) Emma Lawson	125	162
25	(Chile) Benjamín Reyes	210	22	(United Kingdom) Ella Wilkinson	125	135
26	(United States) James Sprague	205	202	(United States) Danielle Brandon	120	138
27	(Finland) Henrik Haapalainen	205	70	(Australia) Madeline Sturt	115	213
28	(United States) Justin Medeiros	195	194	(United States) Rachel Noel	115	85
29	(Spain) Luis Cuellar	185	75	(Switzerland) Aline Wirz	115	176
30	(United States) Saxon Panchik	185	157	(United States) Lydia Fish	115	91

==== 1-rep-max deadlift ====
#	Men	Weight (lb)	Pts Total	Women	Wight (lb)	Pts Total
1	(Canada) Patrick Vellner	605	141	(United Kingdom) Aimee Cringle	425	278
2	(United States) James Sprague	590	250	(United States) Alex Gazan	420	234
3	(United States) Nick Mathew	585	127	(Australia) Madeline Sturt	410	259
4	(United States) Tudor Magda	580	163	(United States) Olivia Kerstetter	400	131
5	(United States) Dallin Pepper	575	225	(Norway) Matilde Garnes	395	123
6	(Georgia (country)) Nika Maisuradze	575	179	(United States) Kyra Milligan	385	214
7	(Brazil) Guilherme Malheiros	570	131	(Republic of Ireland) Holly Tynan	385	102
8	(United States) Colton Mertens	565	238	(Canada) Erica Folo	380	152
9	(New Zealand) Bayley Martin	565	199	(Canada) Anikha Greer	375	175
10	(Germany) Moritz Fiebig	565	203	(United States) Hannah Black	365	118
11	(Spain) Aniol Ekai	565	174	(United States) Paige Rodgers	365	144
12	(United States) Jayson Hopper	565	172	(Switzerland) Mirjam Von Rohr	355	175
13	(United States) Justin Medeiros	565	220	(Italy) Elisa Fuliano	355	177
14	(Finland) Henrik Haapalainen	565	94	(United States) Arielle Loewen	350	173
15	(Brazil) Kalyan Souza	565	103	(Canada) Emma Lawson	350	184
16	(United States) Dylan Hamming	545	132	(United Kingdom) Ella Wilkinson	345	155
17	(Australia) Ricky Garard	535	242	(United States) Lydia Fish	345	109
18	(Australia) Jay Crouch	530	262	(United States) Abigail Domit	340	133
19	(Canada) Jeffrey Adler	530	194	(United Kingdom) Lucy Campbell	340	228
20	(United States) Austin Hatfield	525	232	(Iceland) Bergrós Björnsdóttir	335	148
21	(United States) Quinn Robinson	525	101	(Canada) Janie Cheverie	335	100
22	(Spain) Luis Cuellar	515	83	(United States) Rachel Noel	335	93
23	(United States) Ty Jenkins	505	116	(Albania) Siria Meha	330	123
24	(United States) Spencer Panchik	500	104	(United States) Miley Wade	330	138
25	(United States) Saxon Panchik	500	162	(Republic of Ireland) Lucy McGonigle	330	98
26	(Authorised Neutral Athletes) Roman Khrennikov	495	189	(United States) Alexis Raptis	320	89
27	(Spain) Calum Clements	485	127	(United States) Haley Adams	320	216
28	(France) Victor Hoffer	475	142	(Switzerland) Aline Wirz	310	178
29	(New Zealand) Ben Fowler	475	71	(United States) Danielle Brandon	310	139
30	(Chile) Benjamín Reyes	405	22	(Australia) Ellie Turner	95	206

=== Event 6: Grass Oval Bicycle Race ===
For time:

- 20 laps on the track

#	Men	Time	Pts Total	Women	Time	Pts Total
1	(Germany) Moritz Fiebig	18:15.77	303	(United Kingdom) Aimee Cringle	19:10.78	378
2	(United States) Dallin Pepper	18:15.91	321	(Canada) Emma Lawson	19:17.29	280
3	(Australia) Jay Crouch	18:16.16	354	(United Kingdom) Lucy Campbell	19:17.30	320
4	(United States) James Sprague	18:16.21	338	(Switzerland) Aline Wirz	19:17.58	266
5	(United States) Jayson Hopper	18:16.53	256	(United States) Haley Adams	19:34.80	300
6	(Australia) Ricky Garard	18:16.64	322	(Australia) Madeline Sturt	19:51.28	339
7	(Authorised Neutral Athletes) Roman Khrennikov	18:17.46	265	(Australia) Ellie Turner	20:11.34	282
8	(United States) Justin Medeiros	18:18.11	292	(Republic of Ireland) Holly Tynan	20:17.75	174
9	(New Zealand) Bayley Martin	18:21.63	267	(Norway) Matilde Garnes	20:18.48	191
10	(Spain) Luis Cuellar	18:28.14	147	(Italy) Elisa Fuliano	20:18.98	241
11	(New Zealand) Ben Fowler	18:29.52	131	(Albania) Siria Meha	20:39.24	183
12	(United States) Tudor Magda	18:29.65	219	(United States) Olivia Kerstetter	20:39.58	187
13	(Brazil) Kalyan Souza	18:35.55	155	(United States) Alexis Raptis	20:41.97	141
14	(Spain) Aniol Ekai	18:53.69	222	(Republic of Ireland) Lucy McGonigle	20:42.76	146
15	(United States) Saxon Panchik	18:57.34	207	(Iceland) Bergrós Björnsdóttir	20:45.08	193
16	(France) Victor Hoffer	18:58.85	184	(Canada) Janie Cheverie	20:50.03	142
17	(Canada) Patrick Vellner	19:01.81	180	(United States) Arielle Loewen	20:54.88	212
18	(United States) Spencer Panchik	19:02.65	140	(United States) Abigail Domit	21:09.61	169
19	(Finland) Henrik Haapalainen	19:21.44	127	(United States) Rachel Noel	21:13.90	126
20	(United States) Ty Jenkins	19:21.63	146	(United Kingdom) Ella Wilkinson	21:16.25	185
21	(United States) Nick Mathew	19:29.68	154	(Canada) Erica Folo	21:19.56	179
22	(Brazil) Guilherme Malheiros	19:31.55	155	(United States) Paige Rodgers	21:27.92	168
23	(Spain) Calum Clements	19:37.14	148	(United States) Danielle Brandon	21:30.45	160
24	(Georgia (country)) Nika Maisuradze	19:47.94	197	(United States) Kyra Milligan	21:41.48	232
25	(Canada) Jeffrey Adler	19:57.65	209	(United States) Alex Gazan	21:51.79	249
26	(United States) Austin Hatfield	20:06.08	244	(United States) Lydia Fish	22:00.13	121
27	(United States) Quinn Robinson	20:19.83	110	(United States) Miley Wade	22:45.14	147
28	(Chile) Benjamín Reyes	20:35.40	28	(Switzerland) Mirjam Von Rohr	22:45.26	181
29	(United States) Dylan Hamming	21:25.74	135	(Canada) Anikha Greer	23:06.50	178
30	(United States) Colton Mertens	21:48.03	238	(United States) Hannah Black	24:00.04	118

=== Event 7: Swim Standard ===
For time:

- 200-meter swim
- 40 burpees
- 150-meter swim
- 30 burpees
- 100-meter swim
- 20 burpees
- 50-meter swim
- 10 burpees

#	Men	Time	Pts Total	Women	Time	Pts Total
1	(United States) Ty Jenkins	11:09	246	(United Kingdom) Lucy Campbell	10:55	420
2	(United States) Justin Medeiros	11:23	388	(United States) Paige Rodgers	12:04	264
3	(United States) Dallin Pepper	11:49	413	(United States) Danielle Brandon	12:18	252
4	(United States) Saxon Panchik	12:00	295	(United States) Arielle Loewen	12:32	300
5	(Spain) Luis Cuellar	12:04	231	(Canada) Emma Lawson	12:40	364
6	(United States) James Sprague	12:17	418	(United Kingdom) Aimee Cringle	12:51	458
7	(Authorised Neutral Athletes) Roman Khrennikov	12:18	341	(United States) Alex Gazan	12:53	325
8	(Canada) Jeffrey Adler	12:20	281	(United States) Haley Adams	13:01	372
9	(France) Victor Hoffer	12:34	252	(Australia) Madeline Sturt	13:04	407
10	(Australia) Ricky Garard	12:34	386	(Norway) Matilde Garnes	13:07	255
11	(United States) Colton Mertens	12:42	298	(Canada) Janie Cheverie	13:21	202
12	(United States) Tudor Magda	12:42	279	(Albania) Siria Meha	13:27	239
13	(Germany) Moritz Fiebig	12:51	355	(Iceland) Bergrós Björnsdóttir	13:38	245
14	(United States) Jayson Hopper	12:54	304	(Switzerland) Aline Wirz	13:44	314
15	(Brazil) Guilherme Malheiros	13:12	200	(United States) Alexis Raptis	13:49	186
16	(United States) Spencer Panchik	13:13	182	(United States) Rachel Noel	13:53	168
17	(United States) Quinn Robinson	13:13	152	(Italy) Elisa Fuliano	13:59	280
18	(Georgia (country)) Nika Maisuradze	13:13	239	(United States) Miley Wade	14:00	183
19	(Australia) Jay Crouch	13:15	387	(United States) Olivia Kerstetter	14:01	220
20	(Finland) Henrik Haapalainen	13:33	157	(Republic of Ireland) Lucy McGonigle	14:22	176
21	(New Zealand) Ben Fowler	13:45	158	(United Kingdom) Ella Wilkinson	14:25	212
22	(Spain) Calum Clements	13:47	172	(Republic of Ireland) Holly Tynan	14:34	198
23	(Chile) Benjamín Reyes	14:00	49	(Switzerland) Mirjam Von Rohr	14:37	202
24	(United States) Austin Hatfield	14:01	262	(United States) Abigail Domit	14:42	187
25	(Spain) Aniol Ekai	14:11	237	(United States) Kyra Milligan	14:49	247
26	(United States) Dylan Hamming	14:15	147	(United States) Hannah Black	15:02	130
27	(Brazil) Kalyan Souza	14:16	164	(United States) Lydia Fish	15:03	130
28	(United States) Nick Mathew	15:05	160	(Australia) Ellie Turner	15:25	288
29	(New Zealand) Bayley Martin	15:12	270	(Canada) Anikha Greer	15:50	181
30	(Canada) Patrick Vellner	CAP+11	180	(Canada) Erica Folo	CAP+11	179

=== Event 8: Climbing Snail '26 ===
For time:

- Snail push
- 2 (F)/3 (M) legless rope climbs
- 30 toes-to-bars
- 4 (F) /5 (M) rope climbs
- Snail push

#	Men	Time	Pts Total	Women	Time	Pts Total
1	(Authorised Neutral Athletes) Roman Khrennikov	05:27.60	441	(United States) Alex Gazan	04:55.22	425
2	(United States) James Sprague	05:46.03	514	(United States) Paige Rodgers	05:08.73	360
3	(United States) Dallin Pepper	05:52.12	505	(United States) Danielle Brandon	05:23.14	344
4	(United States) Jayson Hopper	06:00.48	392	(Italy) Elisa Fuliano	05:27.14	368
5	(Australia) Ricky Garard	06:09.03	470	(Canada) Emma Lawson	05:27.99	448
6	(Brazil) Guilherme Malheiros	06:22.52	280	(United Kingdom) Aimee Cringle	05:30.70	538
7	(Canada) Patrick Vellner	06:23.29	256	(United States) Kyra Milligan	05:33.01	323
8	(Finland) Henrik Haapalainen	06:23.98	229	(Australia) Madeline Sturt	05:33.01	479
9	(United States) Justin Medeiros	06:28.52	456	(Albania) Siria Meha	05:41.21	307
10	(Spain) Calum Clements	06:41.63	236	(United States) Olivia Kerstetter	05:43.49	284
11	(United States) Dylan Hamming	06:50.11	207	(United Kingdom) Lucy Campbell	05:46.60	480
12	(Brazil) Kalyan Souza	06:58.21	220	(Australia) Ellie Turner	05:51.07	344
13	(Germany) Moritz Fiebig	06:59.47	407	(Switzerland) Aline Wirz	05:54.87	366
14	(Canada) Jeffrey Adler	07:09.71	329	(United States) Rachel Noel	05:55.68	216
15	(Georgia (country)) Nika Maisuradze	07:11.70	284	(United States) Haley Adams	06:05.32	417
16	(United States) Quinn Robinson	07:15.62	194	(Republic of Ireland) Lucy McGonigle	06:08.02	218
17	(Australia) Jay Crouch	07:18.84	426	(United States) Miley Wade	06:09.89	222
18	(New Zealand) Bayley Martin	07:19.34	306	(United States) Arielle Loewen	06:13.69	336
19	(New Zealand) Ben Fowler	07:22.99	191	(United States) Abigail Domit	06:16.20	220
20	(France) Victor Hoffer	07:24.64	282	(United States) Lydia Fish	06:16.61	160
21	(Spain) Luis Cuellar	07:51.43	258	(Norway) Matilde Garnes	06:30.96	282
22	(United States) Saxon Panchik	07:57.20	319	(Republic of Ireland) Holly Tynan	06:56.53	222
23	(United States) Ty Jenkins	08:05.23	267	(Canada) Janie Cheverie	07:04.68	223
24	(United States) Austin Hatfield	08:13.97	280	(Canada) Anikha Greer	07:15.37	199
25	(United States) Spencer Panchik	08:16.74	197	(United Kingdom) Ella Wilkinson	07:39.91	227
26	(United States) Colton Mertens	08:18.83	310	(Iceland) Bergrós Björnsdóttir	08:01.15	257
27	(Chile) Benjamín Reyes	08:58.27	58	(United States) Alexis Raptis	08:14.02	195
28	(United States) Nick Mathew	09:35.99	166	(Canada) Erica Folo	08:42.88	185
29	(United States) Tudor Magda	CAP+1	282	(Switzerland) Mirjam Von Rohr	CAP+3	205
30	(Spain) Aniol Ekai	CAP+13	237	(United States) Hannah Black	CAP+41	130

=== Event 9: 3D Throw ===
For total distance:

- 1 throw, right
- 1 throw, left
- 1 throw, backward

#	Men	Distance	Pts Total	Women	Distance	Pts Total
1	(Brazil) Guilherme Malheiros	123	330	(United States) Abigail Domit	108	270
2	(United States) Dylan Hamming	122	255	(United States) Hannah Black	106	178
3	(Canada) Patrick Vellner	122	304	(United States) Alex Gazan	100	471
4	(New Zealand) Bayley Martin	117	350	(Canada) Anikha Greer	99	243
5	(Finland) Henrik Haapalainen	116	271	(Iceland) Bergrós Björnsdóttir	99	301
6	(United States) Jayson Hopper	114	432	(Norway) Matilde Garnes	97	322
7	(Spain) Aniol Ekai	114	277	(United Kingdom) Aimee Cringle	97	578
8	(United States) Dallin Pepper	114	541	(United States) Arielle Loewen	96	372
9	(Brazil) Kalyan Souza	113	254	(United States) Kyra Milligan	95	357
10	(Australia) Jay Crouch	113	460	(Australia) Madeline Sturt	94	511
11	(Spain) Calum Clements	113	270	(Republic of Ireland) Holly Tynan	93	252
12	(France) Victor Hoffer	111	310	(United States) Paige Rodgers	93	390
13	(United States) Quinn Robinson	111	220	(United Kingdom) Lucy Campbell	93	510
14	(Spain) Luis Cuellar	111	286	(United States) Danielle Brandon	92	368
15	(United States) James Sprague	110	536	(United States) Rachel Noel	89	238
16	(Canada) Jeffrey Adler	110	349	(Canada) Emma Lawson	89	470
17	(Authorised Neutral Athletes) Roman Khrennikov	107	459	(United States) Lydia Fish	87	178
18	(United States) Justin Medeiros	106	472	(United Kingdom) Ella Wilkinson	87	243
19	(Germany) Moritz Fiebig	106	423	(United States) Olivia Kerstetter	87	298
20	(United States) Spencer Panchik	104	209	(Switzerland) Aline Wirz	87	384
21	(Georgia (country)) Nika Maisuradze	104	296	(United States) Haley Adams	86	427
22	(United States) Austin Hatfield	103	288	(Italy) Elisa Fuliano	84	376
23	(United States) Ty Jenkins	103	275	(Australia) Ellie Turner	82	351
24	(United States) Tudor Magda	102	288	(United States) Alexis Raptis	81	201
25	(Australia) Ricky Garard	101	475	(Switzerland) Mirjam Von Rohr	81	211
26	(United States) Saxon Panchik	100	323	(Albania) Siria Meha	81	313
27	(United States) Nick Mathew	98	169	(Canada) Janie Cheverie	81	229
28	(Chile) Benjamín Reyes	90	58	(Canada) Erica Folo	80	187
29	(United States) Colton Mertens	89	311	(United States) Miley Wade	79	223
30	(New Zealand) Ben Fowler	86	191	(Republic of Ireland) Lucy McGonigle	72	218

=== Event 10: Run Hang Squat Clean ===
4 rounds for time of:

- 660-meter run
- 10 hang squat cleans

(F: 155-lb short barbell; M: 225-lb short barbell)

#	Men	Time	Pts Total	Women	Time	Pts Total
1	(Australia) Jay Crouch	14:15.05	560	(Canada) Emma Lawson	14:56.52	570
2	(United States) Justin Medeiros	14:28.63	568	(United Kingdom) Lucy Campbell	14:58.20	606
3	(Canada) Jeffrey Adler	14:29.04	441	(Australia) Ellie Turner	15:22.34	443
4	(Authorised Neutral Athletes) Roman Khrennikov	14:34.51	547	(United Kingdom) Aimee Cringle	15:44.14	666
5	(United States) Jayson Hopper	14:40.02	516	(Albania) Siria Meha	15:51.76	397
6	(United States) James Sprague	15:00.07	616	(United States) Arielle Loewen	15:56.13	452
7	(United States) Dylan Hamming	15:03.30	331	(United States) Kyra Milligan	16:00.44	433
8	(United States) Colton Mertens	15:05.27	383	(United States) Olivia Kerstetter	16:02.53	370
9	(United States) Austin Hatfield	15:12.86	356	(United States) Miley Wade	16:09.65	291
10	(United States) Dallin Pepper	15:19.14	605	(Australia) Madeline Sturt	16:11.05	575
11	(Australia) Ricky Garard	15:32.18	535	(United States) Danielle Brandon	16:28.56	428
12	(Georgia (country)) Nika Maisuradze	15:38.86	352	(United States) Alex Gazan	16:35.63	527
13	(United States) Quinn Robinson	15:59.74	272	(United States) Abigail Domit	16:36.42	322
14	(Spain) Aniol Ekai	16:09.48	325	(Switzerland) Mirjam Von Rohr	16:42.25	259
15	(United States) Saxon Panchik	16:20.63	368	(Canada) Erica Folo	16:56.32	232
16	(New Zealand) Ben Fowler	16:40.84	233	(United States) Lydia Fish	17:04.24	220
17	(Brazil) Kalyan Souza	16:42.41	293	(United States) Haley Adams	17:13.33	466
18	(United States) Ty Jenkins	16:45.45	311	(Republic of Ireland) Holly Tynan	17:19.18	288
19	(Canada) Patrick Vellner	16:48.62	337	(United States) Paige Rodgers	17:21.02	423
20	(United States) Nick Mathew	16:57.01	199	(United Kingdom) Ella Wilkinson	17:26.14	273
21	(Germany) Moritz Fiebig	17:02.88	450	(United States) Rachel Noel	17:36.16	265
22	(France) Victor Hoffer	17:04.33	334	(Canada) Anikha Greer	17:38.10	267
23	(Brazil) Guilherme Malheiros	17:21.56	351	(Italy) Elisa Fuliano	17:39.82	397
24	(New Zealand) Bayley Martin	17:35.09	368	(Iceland) Bergrós Björnsdóttir	17:43.48	319
25	(Spain) Luis Cuellar	17:49.10	301	(Canada) Janie Cheverie	17:52.04	244
26	(United States) Spencer Panchik	18:04.51	221	(United States) Hannah Black	18:39.80	190
27	(Spain) Calum Clements	18:19.92	279	(Switzerland) Aline Wirz	19:07.07	393
28	(Chile) Benjamín Reyes	18:33.33	64	(United States) Alexis Raptis	20:28.83	207
29	(United States) Tudor Magda	19:14.67	291	(Republic of Ireland) Lucy McGonigle	CAP+3	221
30	(Finland) Henrik Haapalainen	20:02.57	271	(Norway) Matilde Garnes	CAP+11	322

=== Event 11: Handstand Sprint ===
For time:

- Handstand walk course

#	Men	Time	Pts Total	Women	Time	Pts Total
1	(France) Victor Hoffer	01:05.62	434	(United States) Paige Rodgers	01:56.58	523
2	(Brazil) Guilherme Malheiros	01:30.26	447	(Italy) Elisa Fuliano	02:03.55	493
3	(New Zealand) Ben Fowler	01:50.18	325	(United States) Lydia Fish	02:36.49	312
4	(Finland) Henrik Haapalainen	02:03.19	359	(United States) Alexis Raptis	02:46.78	295
5	(Australia) Jay Crouch	02:05.48	644	(Canada) Anikha Greer	02:47.98	351
6	(United States) Justin Medeiros	02:05.49	648	(Canada) Emma Lawson	02:59.16	650
7	(United States) Colton Mertens	02:05.66	459	(United States) Alex Gazan	03:12.02	603
8	(Australia) Ricky Garard	02:07.48	607	(United Kingdom) Aimee Cringle	03:13.16	738
9	(United States) Tudor Magda	02:09.07	359	(United States) Abigail Domit	03:16.50	390
10	(United States) Dylan Hamming	02:19.22	395	(United States) Kyra Milligan	03:28.62	497
11	(Georgia (country)) Nika Maisuradze	02:28.26	412	(United States) Danielle Brandon	03:36.49	488
12	(United States) Austin Hatfield	02:28.33	412	(Canada) Janie Cheverie	03:40.18	300
13	(New Zealand) Bayley Martin	02:28.37	420	(United States) Arielle Loewen	03:53.41	504
14	(United States) James Sprague	02:33.34	664	(Switzerland) Aline Wirz	04:51.58	441
15	(Chile) Benjamín Reyes	02:38.43	109	(Switzerland) Mirjam Von Rohr	05:15.69	304
16	(Canada) Patrick Vellner	02:38.96	379	(Albania) Siria Meha	05:26.72	439
17	(United States) Jayson Hopper	02:51.10	555	(Iceland) Bergrós Björnsdóttir	05:27.30	358
18	(United States) Saxon Panchik	02:59.04	404	(Republic of Ireland) Lucy McGonigle	CAP+1	257
19	(United States) Dallin Pepper	03:05.87	638	(United Kingdom) Lucy Campbell	CAP+1	639
20	(United States) Spencer Panchik	03:09.48	251	(United Kingdom) Ella Wilkinson	CAP+1	303
21	(United States) Nick Mathew	03:14.43	226	(United States) Olivia Kerstetter	CAP+1	397
22	(Germany) Moritz Fiebig	03:19.10	474	(United States) Haley Adams	CAP+1	490
23	(Canada) Jeffrey Adler	03:20.39	462	(Australia) Madeline Sturt	CAP+1	596
24	(Authorised Neutral Athletes) Roman Khrennikov	03:47.64	565	(United States) Miley Wade	CAP+1	309
25	(United States) Ty Jenkins	03:55.35	326	(Norway) Matilde Garnes	CAP+1	337
26	(Brazil) Kalyan Souza	03:57.98	305	(Australia) Ellie Turner	CAP+2	455
27	(Spain) Calum Clements	04:30.52	288	(Republic of Ireland) Holly Tynan	CAP+7	297
28	(Spain) Aniol Ekai	04:47.44	331	(United States) Rachel Noel	CAP+7	271
29	(Spain) Luis Cuellar	CAP+1	304	(United States) Hannah Black	CAP+11	193
30	(United States) Quinn Robinson	CAP+11	272	(Canada) Erica Folo	CAP+11	232

=== Event 12: The Hopper 2026 ===
3 rounds for time of:

- 21 toes-to-bars
- 7 unbroken power snatches (65/95 lb)
- 7 unbroken hang snatches
- 7 unbroken squat snatches

#	Men	Time	Pts Total	Women	Time	Pts Total
1	(United States) Colton Mertens	04:55.57	559	(United Kingdom) Lucy Campbell	05:02.48	739
2	(Australia) Jay Crouch	04:59.27	740	(United States) Abigail Domit	05:04.36	486
3	(United States) Jayson Hopper	05:08.23	647	(United States) Danielle Brandon	05:04.93	580
4	(United States) James Sprague	05:10.54	752	(United Kingdom) Aimee Cringle	05:05.00	826
5	(United States) Justin Medeiros	05:17.38	732	(Canada) Emma Lawson	05:06.45	734
6	(France) Victor Hoffer	05:19.79	514	(Norway) Matilde Garnes	05:08.67	417
7	(United States) Dallin Pepper	05:23.06	714	(United States) Arielle Loewen	05:12.64	580
8	(Canada) Patrick Vellner	05:29.27	451	(Republic of Ireland) Lucy McGonigle	05:17.91	329
9	(Australia) Ricky Garard	05:33.12	675	(Italy) Elisa Fuliano	05:24.82	561
10	(New Zealand) Bayley Martin	05:35.32	484	(Albania) Siria Meha	05:24.95	503
11	(Brazil) Guilherme Malheiros	05:36.47	507	(United States) Paige Rodgers	05:26.05	583
12	(Canada) Jeffrey Adler	05:39.72	518	(Australia) Madeline Sturt	05:27.42	652
13	(United States) Austin Hatfield	05:40.25	464	(United States) Alexis Raptis	05:31.63	347
14	(United States) Saxon Panchik	05:40.80	452	(United States) Olivia Kerstetter	05:35.76	445
15	(Georgia (country)) Nika Maisuradze	05:41.11	457	(United States) Hannah Black	05:38.95	238
16	(United States) Tudor Magda	05:41.90	401	(Canada) Erica Folo	05:44.13	274
17	(Finland) Henrik Haapalainen	05:43.58	398	(United States) Haley Adams	05:46.16	529
18	(Spain) Calum Clements	05:44.55	324	(United States) Lydia Fish	05:47.00	348
19	(United States) Dylan Hamming	05:51.36	428	(United States) Alex Gazan	05:53.36	636
20	(United States) Spencer Panchik	05:56.21	281	(Republic of Ireland) Holly Tynan	05:54.92	327
21	(Authorised Neutral Athletes) Roman Khrennikov	05:57.36	592	(Switzerland) Mirjam Von Rohr	05:55.75	331
22	(Spain) Aniol Ekai	CAP+0	355	(Iceland) Bergrós Björnsdóttir	05:56.87	382
23	(United States) Nick Mathew	CAP+2	247	(United States) Kyra Milligan	CAP+0	518
24	(Germany) Moritz Fiebig	CAP+3	492	(Switzerland) Aline Wirz	CAP+2	459
25	(United States) Ty Jenkins	CAP+3	341	(Canada) Anikha Greer	CAP+2	366
26	(Spain) Luis Cuellar	CAP+5	316	(United States) Miley Wade	CAP+3	321
27	(New Zealand) Ben Fowler	CAP+6	334	(United Kingdom) Ella Wilkinson	CAP+4	312
28	(Brazil) Kalyan Souza	CAP+7	311	(Canada) Janie Cheverie	CAP+7	306
29	(United States) Quinn Robinson	CAP+7	272	(Australia) Ellie Turner	CAP+7	458
30	(Chile) Benjamín Reyes	CAP+8	111	(United States) Rachel Noel	CAP+7	271

=== Event 13: 500 Run ===
- 500-meter sprint

=== Event 14: Triple Pig ===
For time:

- 10 bar muscle-ups
- 15 GHD sit-up wall-ball shots
- 20 triple-unders
- 1 Pig flip
- 15 bar muscle-ups
- 20 GHD sit-up wall-ball shots
- 25 triple-unders
- 2 Pig flips
- 20 bar muscle-ups
- 25 GHD sit-up wall-ball shots
- 30 triple-unders
- 3 Pig flips

=== Event 15: 2020 Speed Snatch ===
Elimination rounds:

Round 1: 10 eliminated

- 3 snatches (1-minute cap)

(F: 145 – 150 – 155 lb; M: 225 – 235 – 245 lb )

Round 2: 10 eliminated

- 3 snatches (2-minute cap)

(F: 160 – 165 – 170 lb; M: 245 – 255 – 265 lb}

Round 3:

- 3 snatches (3-minute cap)

( F: 175 – 180 – 185 lb; M: 265 – 275 – 285 lb)

=== Event 18: Machine 7200m ===
For time:

- Row 3,600 meters
- Ski 3,600 meters

=== Event 19: Roll to Support AMRAP ===
As many reps as possible in 5 minutes of:

- 4 forward rolls to support
- 3 backward rolls to support

=== Event 20: Fibonacci Final ===
5-8-13 reps for time of:

- Deficit handstand push-ups
- Double-kettlebell deadlifts

Then,

- 89-foot kettlebell overhead walking lunge

=== Final standings ===
Men
#	Name	Pts
1	(United States) James Sprague	1318
2	(United States) Dallin Pepper	1291
3	(Australia) Jay Crouch	1228
4	(United States) Justin Medeiros	1104
5	(Australia) Ricky Garard	1100
6	(United States) Jayson Hopper	1059
7	(Canada) Jeffrey Adler	970
8	(Authorised Neutral Athletes) Roman Khrennikov	946
9	(Brazil) Guilherme Malheiros	904
10	(Germany) Moritz Fiebig	898
11	(United States) Colton Mertens	825
12	(United States) Dylan Hamming	816
13	(New Zealand) Bayley Martin	804
14	(France) Victor Hoffer	775
15	(United States) Austin Hatfield	762
16	(United States) Tudor Magda	757
17	(Canada) Patrick Vellner	751
18	(Georgia (country)) Nika Maisuradze	745
19	(United States) Ty Jenkins	713
20	(Finland) Henrik Haapalainen	674
21	(United States) Saxon Panchik	641
22	(Spain) Aniol Ekai	635
23	(Brazil) Kalyan Souza	614
24	(Spain) Calum Clements	603
25	(United States) Quinn Robinson	515
26	(New Zealand) Ben Fowler	513
27	(United States) Spencer Panchik	512
28	(United States) Nick Mathew	479
29	(Spain) Luis Cuellar	456
30	(Chile) Benjamín Reyes	360

Women
#	Name	Pts
1	(United Kingdom) Aimee Cringle	1394
2	(Canada) Emma Lawson	1258
3	(United Kingdom) Lucy Campbell	1229
4	(United States) Alex Gazan	1041
5	(Australia) Madeline Sturt	1026
6	(United States) Olivia Kerstetter	992
7	(United States) Arielle Loewen	987
8	(United States) Paige Rodgers	967
9	(Italy) Elisa Fuliano	926
10	(United States) Danielle Brandon	926
11	(United States) Haley Adams	882
12	(Albania) Siria Meha	857
13	(Australia) Ellie Turner	836
14	(United States) Abigail Domit	826
15	(United States) Kyra Milligan	815
16	(Norway) Matilde Garnes	729
17	(Republic of Ireland) Holly Tynan	651
18	(Switzerland) Aline Wirz	647
19	(Iceland) Bergrós Björnsdóttir	647
20	(United States) Alexis Raptis	644
21	(Canada) Anikha Greer	627
22	(United Kingdom) Ella Wilkinson	603
23	(United States) Rachel Noel	590
24	(United States) Lydia Fish	590
25	(United States) Miley Wade	579
26	(Switzerland) Mirjam Von Rohr	560
27	(Canada) Janie Cheverie	529
28	(Canada) Erica Folo	459
29	(United States) Hannah Black	393
30	(Republic of Ireland) Lucy McGonigle	332

== Team competition ==
=== Final standings ===
Teams
#	Name	Pts
1	(United States) CrossFit Whip	1055
2	(United States) CrossFit Mayhem	1030
3	(Norway) CrossFit Oslo Kriger	940
4	(Australia) Homefront CrossFit PRVN	785
5	(United States) Camp Rhino CrossFit	770
6	(Sweden) CrossFit Sodra Wattern	760
7	(Norway) CrossFit Asker Kriger	730
8	(New Zealand) CrossFit Kia Maia	700
9	(United States) Solidarity CrossFit Basecamp	630
10	(Australia) Snake CrossFit HWPO	595
11	(United Kingdom) Blueprint CrossFit Team AOD	590
12	(Denmark) CrossFit Butcher's Lab Pursuit	580
13	(United States) CrossFit 1124	570
14	(Iceland) CrossFit Reykjavík	525
15	(Argentina) Q21 CrossFit	525
16	(United States) CrossFit Fort Vancouver	425
17	(United States) CrossFit Body Blueprint	415
18	(United States) CrossFit Hendersonville Mayhem	345
19	(Sweden) CrossFit Uncontained II Relentless	305
20	(United Kingdom) CrossFit Aylesbury	275
