= 2021 CrossFit Games =

Athletic competition

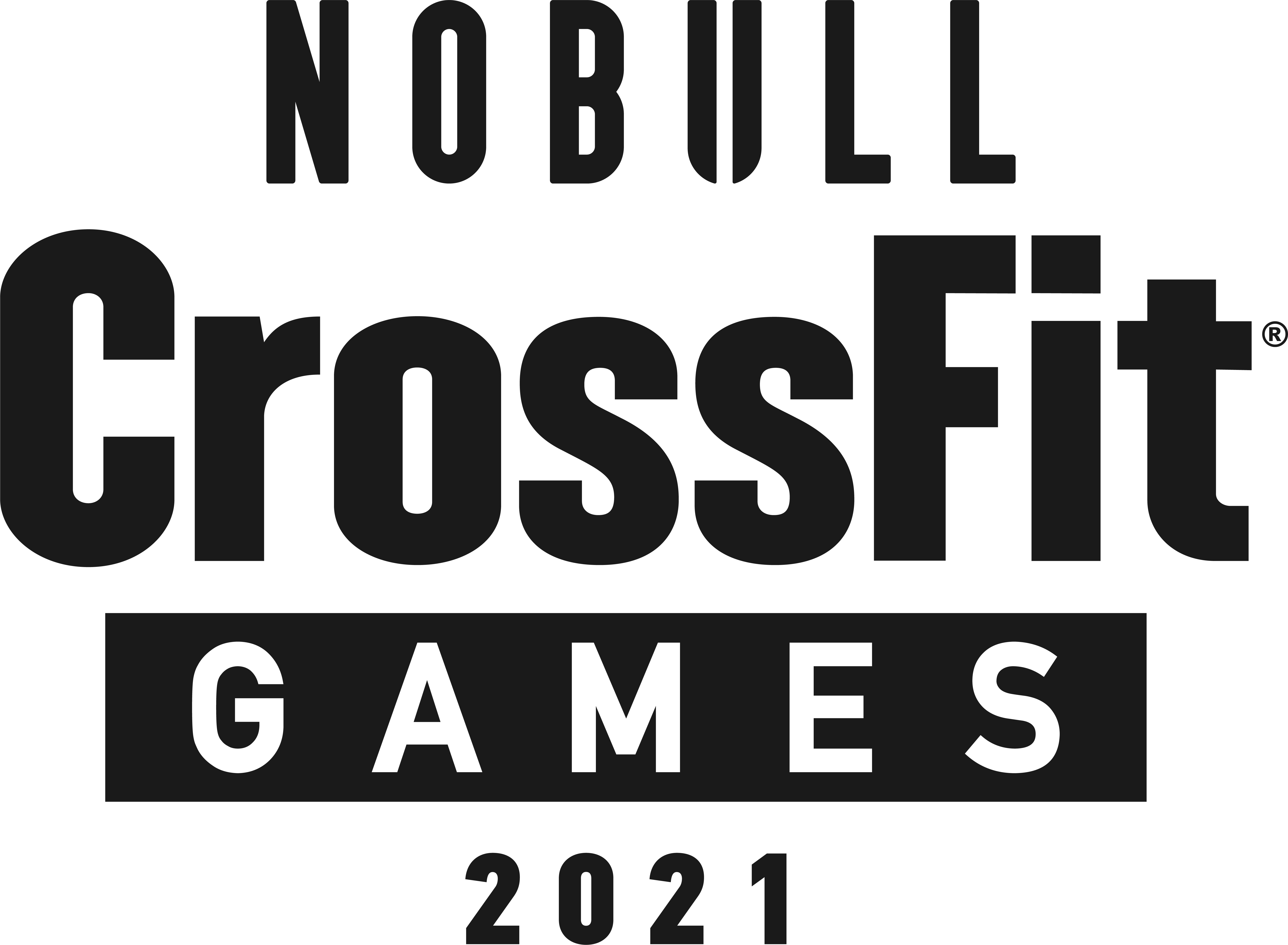
- Venue: Alliant Energy Center
- Location: Madison, Wisconsin
- Dates: July 27–August 1, 2021

Champions
- Men: (United States) Justin Medeiros
- Women: (Australia) Tia-Clair Toomey
- Team: CrossFit Mayhem

The 2021 CrossFit Games was the 15th edition of the CrossFit Games held from July 27 to August 1, 2021. Justin Medeiros won the men's competition, Tia-Clair Toomey the women's, and CrossFit Mayhem the team's.

The qualification process for the Games is similar to that used before it was changed for the previous two seasons, but with the introduction of quarterfinals between the Open and the semifinal, and a last-chance qualifier. The Affiliate Cup returned as the team competition with Games qualification based on gym affiliation and a new adaptive athlete division was introduced this season.

This is the first season sponsored by NoBull after the Reebok sponsorship ended in 2020. The total prize purse increased to $2.5 million with the individual winners each receiving $310,000.

Justin Medeiros won the men's competition and became the youngest man to win the CrossFit Games. Tia-Clair Toomey won the women's competition for the fifth time, equaling Mat Fraser's record. Toomey also broke Fraser's record for the most number of cumulative event wins by bringing her total to 33.

== Qualification ==
The qualification system was revamped again this season, returning to the system whereby the number of participants get winnowed down in series of stages starting with the Open, but with the addition of a quarterfinal stage for individual and teams where the participants were grouped by continent. The Games also returned the team format to an affiliate-based qualification system with the return of the Affiliate Cup, and a new adaptive athlete division was also added.

=== Open ===
The Open returned to its previous role as the starting point of a series of qualification events. The national champion from the Open qualification was removed so that there will be a smaller field of invitees to the Games. The date of the Open was moved back to March, but reduced from five weeks to three starting March 11 with only four workouts held. The number of athletes who registered for the Open increased to over 263,500 after two years of decline. This year prize money was awarded to the overall winners of the Open for the first time in addition to those awarded for individual workout wins, with each overall winner receiving $15,000. Jeffrey Adler and Tia-Clair Toomey were the respective male and female winners of the Open.

=== Quarterfinals ===
Participants in the Open were separated on a continental basis and only the top 10% on each continent from the Open can qualify for the Quarterfinals before they can move on to the sanctioned Semifinals. The new quarterfinals were held online like the Open and similar to those previously used for age-group qualifiers. The Quarterfinals for individuals started on April 8, around a week and a half after the Open had finished. The athletes were required to complete five workouts over three consecutive days after the workouts were released, and submit their results for specific workouts daily from April 9 to April 11. Competitors were ranked by continents; the top 120 men and women and 80 teams from the quarterfinals in North America qualified for the semifinals, while the top 60 men and women and 40 teams in Europe, and the top 30 men and women and 20 teams from each of the continents of Asia, Africa, South America, and Oceania also qualified.

Team quarterfinals for the top 25% teams were held from April 22 to April 25. For teens aged 14-17 and masters aged 35 and over, the Age Group Online Qualifier was used as in previous years, but the number of qualifiers from the Open was fixed at 10% instead of 200 athletes. Age Group Online Qualifier took place from May 6 to 9, with the top 20 men and 20 women of each age-group qualifying directly for the Games.

=== Semifinals ===
The revamped Semifinals this season were a mix of the Regionals and Sanctionals; the participants competed in their own regions (continents), but each individual Semifinal was organized independently and responsible for its own programming, apart from those held online where all followed the same standardized programming arranged by CrossFit. A few athletes who cannot return to compete in their own continent due to travel restrictions were placed in Semifinals closer to where they lived or where they can compete online. The prize purse was returned to 2018 level with a standardized $5,000 for the winners of each Semifinal with the top-paying Sanctionals of previous two seasons such as Wodapalooza, Dubai CrossFit Championship and the Rogue Invitational opting out of the Crossfit season.

A total of ten Semifinals were scheduled on six continents spread over four weeks starting May 28, 2021, each one taking place in the last three days of the week. Four semifinals were held in North America (Mid-Atlantic CF Challenge, Granite Games, West Coast Classic, Atlas Games), two in Europe (Lowland Throwdown, GermanThrowdown), one each in South America (Brazil CF Championship), Asia (Asia Invitational), Africa (Fittest In Cape Town), and Oceania (Torian Pro). Due to the differing national measures and travel restrictions imposed in response to the ongoing COVID-19 pandemic, five semifinals were held online, five in-person. Five men, five women, and five teams qualified from each of the North American and European semifinals, three from Oceania, two from Asia and South America, and one from Africa. A last-chance online qualifier, last used in 2009, was reintroduced for semifinal athletes who narrowly missed a Games qualification. Two more athletes who missed qualification in the semifinals may qualify via the last-chance qualifier.

== Individual competitions ==
The CrossFit Games are held in Madison, Wisconsin, from July 28 to August 1, 2021. Athletes competed in person, but an online contingency plan was also put in place as an alternative should it be necessary. For the individual events, 40 men and 40 women qualified for the individual events at the Games, but three Russians could not attend the Games due to visa problems, one woman could not start for a positive drug test, and two women, including 2020 podium finisher Kari Pearce, had to withdraw due to positive COVID-19 tests, Kara Saunders also had to withdraw after the first day due to the after-effects of an earlier infection. The number of athletes would be cut to 30 after two days of competition (9 events), and to 20 after the first event of Day 3 (event 10). The scoring system this year was the same as the top 40 of the 2019 Games, and the number of points awarded was adjusted after each cut.

=== Wednesday, July 28, 2021 ===
- Event 1: 1-mile swim with fins, 3-mile kayak (Winners: M- Jonne Koski; F- Tia-Clair Toomey)
- Event 2: 126-ft. sled drag (180 lb. for women, 220 lb. for men), 5 Pig flips (350 lb. for women, 510 lb. for men), 12 muscle-ups, 12 bar muscle-ups, 12 bar muscle-ups, 12 muscle-ups, 5 Pig flips. 126-ft. sled drag (Winners: M- Patrick Vellner; F- Tia-Clair Toomey)
- Event 3: 550-yard sprint (Winners: M- Guilherme Malheiros; F- Tia-Clair Toomey)
- Event 4: 10-9-8-7-6-5-4-3-2-1 reps of: Wall walks and Thrusters (135 lb. for women, 185 lb. for men) (Winners: M- Scott Panchik; F- Mallory O'Brien)

=== Friday, July 30, 2021 ===
- Event 5: 4 rope climbs, 500 m/400 m ski erg, Sand bag carry (Winners: M- Patrick Vellner; F- Laura Horváth)
- Event 6: 5 rounds: 250-m run, 1 clean – (Women: 165, 175, 185, 195, 205 lb. Men: 245, 265, 285, 305, 315 lb.) (Winners: M- Jeffrey Adler; F- Tia-Clair Toomey)
- Event 7: 5 rounds: 200-m run, 1 clean – (Women: 210; 215; 220; 225; 230 lb. Men: 325, 335, 340, 345, 350 lb.) (Winners: M- Guilherme Malheiros; F- Tia-Clair Toomey)
- Event 8: Handstand Walk O-course (Winners: M- Scott Panchik; F- Danielle Brandon)
- Event 9: 21-15-9: Echo bike (cal.) Snatch (75lb. for women, 105 lb. for men) (Winners: M- Brent Fikowski; F- Amanda Barnhart)

=== Saturday, July 31, 2021 ===
- Event 10: 30 toes-to-bar, 1.5 mile run, 30 toes-to-bar, 1.5 mile run, 30 toes-to-bar (Winners: M- Lazar Đukić; F- Emily Rolfe)
- Event 11: 11-min AMRAP: 1 pegboard ascent, 7 single-arm dumbbell overhead squats 50 | 70 lb, 15 heavy double-unders (Winners: M- Cole Sager; F- Tia-Clair Toomey)
- Event 12: 1-rep-max snatch (Winners: M- Guilherme Malheiros; F- Tia-Clair Toomey. Brooke Wells had to withdraw from the competition after she dislocated her elbow in the snatch, which required a Tommy John surgery.)

=== Sunday, August 01, 2021 ===
- Event 13: 4 rounds of: 20 GHD sit-ups, 8 cheese curd burpees over the hay bale (70/100 lb), 168ft yoke carry (425/605 lb), 1-min reset, Time caps by round: 2 | 2 | 2 | 3 min. (Winners: M- Björgvin Karl Guðmundsson; F- Tia-Clair Toomey)
- Event 14: 6-10-14 reps of Deadlifts (275/405 lbs) and Free Standing Handstand Push-ups (Winners: M- Patrick Vellner; F- Anníe Þórisdóttir)
- Event 15: 500/600m Row, 90 Chest-2-Bar Pull-ups, 36' Back Rack Lunges, 36' Front Rack Lunges, 36' Overhead Lunges (135/185 lbs) (Winners: M- Justin Medieros; F- Tia-Clair Toomey)

Toomey overtook Mat Fraser for the most number of cumulative Games event wins on Saturday with 30, and ended the Games with 33 event wins, 9 of which was won this year. She also equaled Fraser's record of five Games titles. Medeiros won the last event, his first ever Games event win, to seal his victory. The title win made him the youngest ever Games male winner. Mallory O'Brien was named Rookie of the Year, the first athlete to win the accolade while still a teenager.

== Team competitions ==
=== Thursday, July 29, 2021 ===
- Event 1: FF 500m swim, FF 1000m kayak, MM 500m swim, MM 1000m kayak; Time Cap: 90 min (Winners: CrossFit Mayhem)
- Event 2: 168-ft. Bob Push, 25 synchro bar muscle-ups (in pairs), cheese curd hold (70/100lbs), 336-ft. Bob Push, 50 synchro bar muscle-ups (in pairs), cheese curd hold (70/100lbs); Time Cap: 12 min (Winners: CrossFit Mayhem)
- Event 3: At the 12 min of Event 2: 4 Rounds for Time of 42 synchro toes-to-bar (in pairs), cheese curd hold (70/100lbs), 42 ft Bob Drag; Time Cap: 12 min (Winners: CrossFit Mayhem)
- Event 4: For Time: F/M Pair 1: 7 rounds of: 5 Synchro Wall walks and 5 Thrusters (135 lb. for women, 185 lb. for men); F/M Pair 2: 5 rounds of: 7 Synchro Wall walks and 7 Thrusters (135 lb. for women, 185 lb. for men) (Winners: CrossFit Mayhem)

=== Friday, July 30, 2021 ===
- Event 5: 4 Rounds for Time of: 4 synchro rope climbs (F1/M1), 200/250m ski (F2/M2), 4 synchro rope climbs, (F2/M2), 200/250m ski (F2/M2), 42 ft Bob Hand-over-Hand pull (F/M pairs) (Winners: CrossFit Mayhem)
- Event 6: 2 min after Event 5: 4 Rounds for Time of: Down and Back Run, 42ft Bob Push (M/F pairs) (Winners: CrossFit Oslo)
- Event 7: Relay: F1/M1: 35 Echo Bike calories, 35 snatches (75lb/105lbs); F2/M2: 25 Echo Bike calories, 25 snatches (75lb/105lbs), 10 Echo Bike calories, 10 snatches (75lb/105lbs) (Winners: CrossFit Urban Energy)

=== Saturday, July 31, 2021 ===
- Event 8: 2 Rounds for Time: 1.5 mi run, 168 ft Handstand Walk; Time Cap: 40 min (Winners: CrossFit Oslo)
- Event 9: At 40 min: F/F pair establish 3-rep max Back Squat in 8 minutes, then M/M pair establish 3-rep max back squat in 8 min (Winners: CrossFit Mayhem)
- Event 10: 5 Rounds for Time of: 1 peg board ascent/athlete, 6 synchro burpees over the work (other 3 athletes) into 8 work squats full team; Time Cap: 16 min(Winners: CrossFit Surbiton)

=== Sunday, August 01, 2021 ===
- Event 11: 2.5 Rounds for Time of: 20 GHD sit-ups with med ball (14/20 lb) (M1/F1) 8 synchro burpee curd toss over (70/100lbs) (F2/M2) 20 GHD sit-ups with med ball (14/20 lb) (M2/F2) 8 synchro burpee curd toss over (70/100lbs) (F1/M1), Then 40 worm Hang Clean and Jerks; Time Cap: 17 min (Winners: CrossFit Mayhem)
- Event 12: 21-15-9 reps of Team Deadlifts (805 lbs) and Synchro Strict Handstand Push-ups; Time Cap: 7 min (Winners: CrossFit Genas)
- Event 13: 3x30 pulls-ups each at the same time, 36ft Worm Lunge Left, 36ft Worm Lunge Right, 36ft Worm Lunge Overhead; Time Cap: 7 min (Winners: CrossFit Mayhem)

== Podium finishers ==
=== Individuals and teams ===
Place	Men	Women	Team
1st	(United States) Justin Medeiros	(Australia) Tia-Clair Toomey	CrossFit Mayhem
2nd	(Canada) Patrick Vellner	(Hungary) Laura Horváth	CrossFit Oslo
3rd	(Canada) Brent Fikowski	(Iceland) Annie Thorisdottir	CrossFit Genas

=== Masters men ===
Place	35–39	40–44	45–49	50–54	55–59	60–64	65+
1st	(United States) Kyle Kasperbauer	(France) Maxime Guyon	(United States) Jason Grubb	~~(Italy) Bernard Luzi~~ (Note: On 29 July 2021, Bernard Luzi tested positive for meldonium, a banned substance. After a failed appeal Luzi forfeited his win and was given a 4 year suspension from CrossFit Games competitions which will end July 29, 2025. Kevin Koester took Luzi's place as champion.) (United States) Kevin Koester	(Netherlands) Vincent Diephuis	(United States) Will Powell	(United States) Ken Ogden
2nd	(United States) James Hobart	(United States) David Johnston	(United States) Mike Kern	(United States) Brent Maier	(United States) Ron Ortiz	(United States) Carl Giuffre	(United States) George Koch
3rd	(United States) Adrian Conway	(France) Alexandre Jolivet	(United States) Justin Lasala	(United States) Christian Biagi	(Canada) Bruce Young	(United States) Tim Lafromboise	(United States) David Hippensteel

=== Masters women ===
Place	35–39	40–44	45–49	50–54	55–59	60–64	65+
1st	(United States) Whitney Gelin	(United Kingdom) Kelly Friel	(United States) Annie Sakamoto	(United States) Tia Vesser	(Canada) Laurie Meschishnick	(Canada) Susan Clarke	(United States) Patty Bauer
2nd	(United States) Lauren Gravatt	(United States) Rebecca Voigt Miller	(United Kingdom) Ali Crawford	(Canada) Joyanne Cooper	(United States) Karen Lundgren	(United States) Bianca Williams	(United States) Lidia Beer
3rd	(Czech Republic) Aneta Tucker	(United Kingdom) Kelly Marshall	(United States) Jennifer Dieter	(United States) Carrie Sandoval	(United States) Rose Wall	(Canada) Patricia McGill	(United States) Polly McKinstry

=== Teens ===
Place	14–15 Boys	14–15 Girls	16–17 Boys	16–17 Girls
1st	(United States) Ty Jenkins	(United States) Olivia Kerstetter	(United States) Nate Ackermann	(Canada) Emma Lawson
2nd	(United States) Isaiah Weber	(United Kingdom) Lucy McGonigle	(United States) David Bradley	(United States) Olivia Sulek
3rd	(Brazil) Gustavo Pusch	(United States) Hailey Rolfe	(New Zealand) Hiko o te rangi Curtis	(Mexico) Paulina Haro

=== Adaptive divisions ===
Place	Men Upper Extremity	Women Upper Extremity	Men Lower Extremity	Women Lower Extremity	Men Neuromuscular	Women Neuromuscular
1st	(United States) Casey Acree	(Switzerland) Sabrina Daniela Lopez	(Norway) Ole Kristian Antonsen	(United States) Valerie Cohen	(United States) Brett Horchar	(United States) Shannon Ogar
2nd	(United States) Josue Maldonado	(United States) Eileen Quinn	(France) Seraphin Perier	(United States) Natalie Bieule	~~(United Kingdom) George Simonds-Gooding~~ (Note: On July 29 2021, George Simonds-Gooding was found to be in breach of the CrossFit Games drug policy. Gooding was subsequently suspended for 2 years from CrossFit Games competitions with his suspension ending on July 29, 2023. Jcruz Gudino became the second place finisher.) (United States) Jcruz Gudino	(South Africa) Letchen Du Plessis
3rd	(United States) Logan Aldridge	(France) Anne-Laure Coutenceau	(United Kingdom) Elliot Young	(United States) Sarah Rudder	(United States) Sylvania Harrod	(United States) Alisha Davis
