= Dating Naked =

American reality television series

- Genre: Reality television; dating game show
- Presented by: Amy Paffrath; Rocsi Diaz
- Country of origin: United States
- Original language: English
- No. of seasons: 3
- No. of episodes: 33

Production
- Executive producer: Howard Schultz
- Production locations: Panama; Philippines; Bora Bora
- Production company: Lighthearted Entertainment

Original release
- Network: VH1
- Release: July 17, 2014 – September 14, 2016

Dating Naked is an American reality dating game show shown on VH1, which debuted in July 2014. Amy Paffrath served as the host for the first two seasons and was clothed in her appearances. The first season was filmed on an island in Panama. The second season, re-titled Dating Naked: Playing for Keeps and filmed in the Philippines, premiered on July 22, 2015 and concluded on September 16, 2015.

The third season, hosted by Rocsi Diaz and filmed in Bora Bora, premiered on June 29, 2016, and concluded on September 14, 2016. On April 14, 2017, VH1 announced that Dating Naked was canceled after three seasons, though VH1 left open the possibility of a future series reboot. On February 24, 2021, it was announced that the series would be revived by Paramount+.

== Summary ==
The show matched up several contestants who were routinely switched with other contestants. While contestants were nude most of the time, contestants' genitals and female breasts are blurred. The first season featured a new pair of contestants in each episode. There was a format change for the remaining seasons, where there were two main contestants, a male and a female, whom new contestants would join each episode to date them, in a format similar to shows such as The Bachelor.

In the German and British versions of the show, nudity is completely uncensored.

== Episodes ==
=== Series overview ===
Season	Episodes	Originally released	
Season	Episodes	First released	Last released
1	11	July 17, 2014	September 25, 2014
2	10	July 22, 2015	September 16, 2015
3	12	June 29, 2016	September 14, 2016

=== Season 1 (2014) ===
No. overall	No. in season	Title	Original release date	U.S. viewers (millions)
1	1	"Joe and Wee Wee"	July 17, 2014	0.83
2	2	"Steven and Taryn"	July 24, 2014	0.69
3	3	"Keegan and Diane"	July 31, 2014	1.04
4	4	"Chuck and Camille"	August 7, 2014	0.59
5	5	"Mike and Candace"	August 14, 2014	0.74
6	6	"Greg and Ashley"	August 21, 2014	0.54
7	7	"AJ and Liddy"	August 28, 2014	0.56
8	8	"Mike and Moenay"	September 4, 2014	0.67
9	9	"Sean and Juliet"	September 11, 2014	0.53
10	10	"The Wedding"	September 18, 2014	0.59
11	11	"Joe and MJ"	September 25, 2014	0.41

=== Season 2 (2015) ===
No. overall	No. in season	Title	Original release date	U.S. viewers (millions)
12	1	"Strip Down and Buckle Up"	July 22, 2015	0.48
13	2	"Catch and Release"	July 22, 2015	0.47
14	3	"Front-Runners and Back Burners"	July 29, 2015	0.59
15	4	"Check and Mate"	August 5, 2015	0.56
16	5	"Two Young and Too Restless"	August 12, 2015	0.58
17	6	"Big Fights and Bald Heads"	August 19, 2015	0.73
18	7	"Smooches and Sabotages"	August 26, 2015	0.75
19	8	"Passive and Aggressive"	September 2, 2015	0.61
20	9	"Eavesdroppers and Ultimatums"	September 9, 2015	0.64
21	10	"Arrivals and Departures"	September 16, 2015	0.78

=== Season 3 (2016) ===
No. overall	No. in season	Title	Original release date	U.S. viewers (millions)
22	1	"Stripped & Searching"	June 29, 2016	0.62
23	2	"Two-Faces and Suitcases"	July 6, 2016	0.69
24	3	"Drag and Drop"	July 13, 2016	0.47
25	4	"Vamps and Gramps"	July 20, 2016	0.59
26	5	"Shark Bait and Heart Breaks"	July 27, 2016	0.64
27	6	"Lap Dances and Second Chances"	August 3, 2016	0.49
28	7	"Pub Crawls and Great Balls"	August 10, 2016	0.51
29	8	"Reset and Game On"	August 17, 2016	0.46
30	9	"Hit It and Quit It"	August 24, 2016	0.55
31	10	"Kiss & Don't Tell"	August 31, 2016	0.54
32	11	"Chakras & Awe"	September 7, 2016	N/A
33	12	"Returns & Exchanges"	September 14, 2016	N/A

== International versions ==
Region/Country	Name	Channel	Premiere	Presenter(s)
Germany	Dating Naked	Paramount+	January 31, 2023	Meike Emonts
United Kingdom	Dating Naked UK	Paramount+	August 23, 2024	Rylan Clark

== Reception ==
Allison Davis wrote that the show "push[es] the boundaries of courtship and creatively expand[s] the list of activities you can do in the nude," but also criticized the show's pool scenes for being too revealing. Emily Hewett described it as "the most awkward show on television." A more negative review from Time described the show as a typical reality dating show "once you (and the contestants) get used to the nudity gimmick".

== Lawsuit ==
In August 2014, Jessie Nizewitz, a contestant on the third episode of Season 1, which aired on July 31, 2014, filed a lawsuit against series producers Viacom, as well as Firelight Entertainment and Lighthearted Entertainment for $10 million, after they broadcast an uncensored shot of her crotch. Two months later, Viacom, Firelight Entertainment and Lighthearted Entertainment sought to have the lawsuit dismissed, claiming that Nizewitz was in violation of her contract in filing a lawsuit. In March 2015, the lawsuit was dismissed by a New York Supreme Court judge.
