= Alter Ego (TV series) =

American music competition television game show

- Genre: Game show
- Directed by: Sam Wrench
- Presented by: Rocsi Diaz
- Judges: Alanis Morissette; Nick Lachey; Grimes; will.i.am
- Country of origin: United States
- Original language: English
- No. of seasons: 1
- No. of episodes: 11

Production
- Executive producer: Matilda Zoltowski
- Producers: will.i.am; Ann Connor; Will Davalos; Fallon Jethroe; Connor Malbeuf; Jessica Molina; Danni Steele
- Camera setup: Multi-camera
- Running time: 43 minutes
- Production company: Fox Alternative Entertainment

Original release
- Network: Fox
- Release: September 22 – December 8, 2021

Alter Ego is an American music competition game show that aired on Fox from September 22 to December 8, 2021. The series is hosted by Rocsi Diaz.

The premise of the show is that the contestants sing backstage while motion capture technology creates digital avatars that appear in their place.

== Format ==
In the series, contestants stand backstage while singing and dancing, as motion capture technology projects an avatar on stage that moves when the person does. The judges then decide who has the best performance.

== Production ==
On May 17, 2021, it was announced that Fox had ordered the series, with Matilda Zoltowski as executive producer. On July 16, Rocsi Diaz was announced as host of the show, with Alanis Morissette, Nick Lachey, Grimes and will.i.am serving as judges. On July 26, it was announced that Alter Ego would premiere on September 22, following the sixth season premiere of The Masked Singer and a sneak peek episode that aired on September 12. On September 10, the contestants were announced. On May 16, 2022, Fox shelved the series indefinitely.

== Contestants ==
Results
Name	Alter Ego	Current City	Hometown	Age	Episodes										
Name	Alter Ego	Current City	Hometown	Age	1	2	3	4	5	6	7	8	9	10	11
Jacob (Jake) Thomsen (Calinoda)	Dipper Scott	Charlotte, North Carolina		28	KEPT				WIN					KEPT	WINNER
Kyara Tetreault	Seven	Toronto, Ontario, Canada		28	SAFE					WIN				SAFE	RUNNER-UP
Samaera Hirsch	Misty Rose	New Orleans, Louisiana	Glen Head, New York	21	RISK						WIN		KEPT		THIRD
Israa Darwich	Night Journey	Dearborn Heights, Michigan		19			RISK					WIN	SAFE		FOURTH
Chase Padgett	Orlando Deville	Vancouver, Washington	Orlando, Florida	38				RISK				WIN		OUT	
Mariah Rosario (Riah Lena)	Safara	Phoenix, Arizona	Tucson, Arizona	26		SAFE			WIN					OUT	
Matthew Lord	Wolfgang Champagne	Dallas, Texas	Napa, California	60		SAFE					WIN		OUT		
Dasharra Bridges	Queen Dynamite	Atlanta, Georgia	Rochester, New York	31	SAFE					WIN			OUT		
Sarah Isen	St. Luna	Los Angeles, California	Berkeley, California	21			KEPT					OUT			
James Paek	Kingston Sol	Fullerton, California		35			SAFE					OUT			
Mia Cherise Hall	Fern	Rochester, New York	Irondequoit, New York	18				SAFE			OUT				
Anthony Flammia	The Loverboy	Yonkers, New York		34		RISK					OUT				
Kaylee Franzen	Aster	Nashville, Tennessee	Flower Mound, Texas	20		KEPT				OUT					
Mama Yaya (Yasmin Shawamreh)	Siren	Chicago, Illinois		30				KEPT		OUT					
Danielle Cetani	Phoenix Embers	Roseville, California	Stockton, California	39				SAFE	OUT						
Jay Miah	Nevaeh King	Tampa Bay, Florida	Longwood, Florida	32			SAFE		OUT						
Milton Patton (Yote)	Wylie	Hendersonville, Tennessee	Forrest City, Arkansas	30				OUT							
Kaleia Ayelett	The Dawn Majesty	North Hollywood, California	Orlando, Florida	34			OUT								
Kobe Vang	Kai	Schofield, Wisconsin	Berlin, Wisconsin	23		OUT									
Erny Nunez	Bernie Burns	Port Saint Lucie, Florida	New York City, New York	17	OUT										

The singer won the head-to-head round and remained in the competition.
The singer was safe from elimination.
The singer was in the bottom two or three.
The singer was kept on the diamond.
The singer was eliminated from the competition.
The singer did not perform.

== Weeks ==
=== Week 1 (September 22 and 23) ===
Performances on the first episode
#	Name	Alter Ego	Song	Result
1	Dasharra Bridges	Queen Dynamite	"Ain't Nobody" by Chaka Khan	Safe
2	Jacob (Jake) Thomsen (Calinoda)	Dipper Scott	"Unsteady" by X Ambassadors	Kept on the Diamond
3	Erny Nunez	Bernie Burns	"Haven't Met You Yet" by Michael Bublé	Eliminated
4	Samaera Hirsch	Misty Rose	"Levitating" by Dua Lipa	Bottom two
5	Kyara Tetreault	Seven	"Take Me to Church" by Hozier	Safe

Reveal Song: "The Best Is Yet to Come" by Frank Sinatra

Performances on the second episode
#	Name	Alter Ego	Song	Result
1	Anthony Flammia	The Loverboy	"Livin' on a Prayer" by Bon Jovi	Bottom two
2	Mariah Rosario (Riah Lena)	Safara	"Good as Hell" by Lizzo	Safe
3	Matthew Lord	Wolfgang Champagne	"Il mio cuore va" (Note: Despite the Italian lyrics, the song was credited as its original English title.) by Il Divo	Safe
4	Kobe Vang	Kai	"Larger than Life" by Backstreet Boys	Eliminated
5	Kaylee Franzen	Aster	"Rainbow" by Kacey Musgraves	Kept on the Diamond

Reveal Song: "Bye Bye Bye" by *NSYNC

=== Week 2 (September 29) ===
Performances on the third episode
#	Name	Alter Ego	Song	Result
1	Kaleia Ayelett	The Dawn Majesty	"Confident" by Demi Lovato	Eliminated
2	James Paek	Kingston Sol	"Tennessee Whiskey" by Chris Stapleton	Safe
3	Israa Darwich	Night Journey	"This Town" by Niall Horan	Bottom two
4	Jay Miah	Nevaeh King	"I Will Always Love You" by Whitney Houston	Safe
5	Sarah Isen	St. Luna	"Back to Black" by Amy Winehouse	Kept on the Diamond

Reveal Song: "This Is Me" by Keala Settle

=== Week 3 (October 6) ===
Performances on the fourth episode
#	Name	Alter Ego	Song	Result
1	Chase Padgett	Orlando Deville	"I Wish" by Stevie Wonder	Bottom two
2	Mia Cherise Hall	Fern	"Love Me like You Do" by Ellie Goulding	Safe
3	Mama Yaya	Siren	"I Put a Spell on You" by Nina Simone	Kept on the Diamond
4	Milton Patton	Wylie	"Boot Scootin' Boogie" by Brooks & Dunn	Eliminated
5	Danielle Cetani	Phoenix Embers	"Hit Me with Your Best Shot" by Pat Benatar	Safe

Reveal Song: "Check Yes or No" by George Strait

=== Week 4 (October 13) ===
Performances on the fifth episode
#	Name	Alter Ego	Song	Result
1	Jay Miah	Nevaeh King	"I Will Survive" by Gloria Gaynor	Eliminated
2	Mariah Rosario (Riah Lena)	Safara	"Diamonds" by Rihanna	Win
3	Jacob (Jake) Thomsen (Calinoda)	Dipper Scott	"Believer" by Imagine Dragons	Win
4	Danielle Cetani	Phoenix Embers	"Wrecking Ball" by Miley Cyrus	Eliminated

Reveal Songs: "Because You Loved Me" by Celine Dion; "I'm the Only One" by Melissa Etheridge

=== Week 5 (October 20) ===
Performances on the sixth episode
#	Name	Alter Ego	Song	Result
1	Kyara Tetreault	Seven	"Bad Guy" by Billie Eilish	Win
2	Mama Yaya	Siren	"I'm Goin' Down" by Mary J. Blige	Eliminated
3	Kaylee Franzen	Aster	"Complicated" by Avril Lavigne	Eliminated
4	Dasharra Bridges	Queen Dynamite	"Don't Start Now" by Dua Lipa	Win

Reveal Songs: "Rise Up" by Andra Day; "Always Remember Us This Way" by Lady Gaga

=== Week 6 (November 3) ===
Performances on the seventh episode
#	Name	Alter Ego	Song	Result
1	Matthew Lord	Wolfgang Champagne	"Regresa a mí" (Note: "Regresa a mí" is the Spanish version of Toni Braxton's song "Un-Break My Heart". Despite Wolfgang Champagne singing the Spanish version made famous by Il Divo, the song is credited onscreen as its original English title.) by Il Divo	Win
2	Anthony Flammia	The Loverboy	"Toxic" by Britney Spears	Eliminated
3	Mia Cherise Hall	Fern	"You and I" by Lady Gaga	Eliminated
4	Samaera Hirsch	Misty Rose	"Woman" by Kesha	Win

Reveal Songs: "I Want You To Want Me" by Cheap Trick; "A Thousand Years" by Christina Perri

=== Week 7 (November 10) ===
Performances on the eighth episode
#	Name	Alter Ego	Song	Result
1	Chase Padgett	Orlando Deville	"Hard to Handle" by Otis Redding	Win
2	James Paek	Kingston Sol	"High Hopes" by Panic! at the Disco	Eliminated
3	Sarah Isen	St. Luna	"Shallow" by Lady Gaga	Eliminated
4	Israa Darwich	Night Journey	"Wolves" by Selena Gomez	Win

Reveal Songs: "Let It Go" by James Bay; "I Try" by Macy Gray

=== Week 8 (November 17) ===
Performances on the ninth episode
#	Name	Alter Ego	Song	Result
1	Samaera Hirsch	Misty Rose	"Bang Bang" by Ariana Grande, Jessie J, and Nicki Minaj	Kept on the Diamond
2	Matthew Lord	Wolfgang Champagne	"Creep" by Radiohead	Eliminated
3	Dasharra Bridges	Queen Dynamite	"I'm Coming Out" by Diana Ross	Eliminated
4	Israa Darwich	Night Journey	"Who Will Save Your Soul" by Jewel	Safe

Reveal Songs: "Last Dance" by Donna Summer; "Your Song" by Elton John

=== Week 9 (December 1) ===
Performances on the tenth episode
#	Name	Alter Ego	Song	Result
1	Kyara Tetreault	Seven	"Feeling Good" by Michael Bublé	Safe
2	Mariah Rosario (Riah Lena)	Safara	"Stronger (What Doesn't Kill You)" by Kelly Clarkson	Eliminated
3	Jacob (Jake) Thomsen (Calinoda)	Dipper Scott	"Happier" by Marshmello ft. Bastille	Kept on the Diamond
4	Chase Padgett	Orlando Deville	"Living In New York City" by Robin Thicke	Eliminated

Reveal Songs: "Say Something" by A Great Big World & Christina Aguilera; "Hold On, I'm Comin'" by Sam & Dave

=== Week 10 (December 8) ===
Performances on the eleventh episode
#	Name	Alter Ego	Song	Result
1	Kyara Tetreault	Seven	"The House of the Rising Sun" by The Animals	Runner-Up
2	Samaera Hirsch	Misty Rose	"One Last Time" by Ariana Grande	Third
3	Jacob (Jake) Thomsen (Calinoda)	Dipper Scott	"All I Want" by Kodaline	Winner
4	Israa Darwich	Night Journey	"Scars to Your Beautiful" by Alessia Cara	Fourth

Reveal Songs: "I'm Like a Bird" by Nelly Furtado; "Fix You" by Coldplay; "If I Were a Boy" by Beyoncé; "How to Save a Life" by The Fray

== Episodes ==
No.	Title	Original release date	Prod. code	U.S. viewers (millions)
1	"The Auditions Begin"	September 22, 2021	ALT-101	2.93
2	"The Auditions Night 2"	September 23, 2021	ALT-102	2.33
3	"The Auditions Night 3"	September 29, 2021	ALT-103	2.46
4	"The Final Auditions"	October 6, 2021	ALT-104	2.37
5	"The Head To Heads Begin"	October 13, 2021	ALT-105	2.32
6	"The Head To Heads Night 2"	October 20, 2021	ALT-106	2.17
7	"The Head To Heads Night 3"	November 3, 2021	ALT-107	1.96
8	"The Last Night of Head to Heads"	November 10, 2021	ALT-108	1.74
9	"The Semi-Finals Part 1"	November 17, 2021	ALT-109	2.04
10	"The Semi-Finals Part 2"	December 1, 2021	ALT-110	1.89
11	"The Finale"	December 8, 2021	ALT-111	2.03

=== Special ===
Title	Original release date	Prod. code	U.S. viewers (millions)
"The Masked Singer & Alter Ego Sneak Peek"	September 12, 2021	SP-2203	2.94

== Reception ==
Metacritic gave Alter Ego a 34 out of a 100 based on 5 reviews.

== Ratings ==
Viewership and ratings per episode of Alter Ego
No.	Title	Air date	Timeslot (ET)	Rating/share (18–49)	Viewers (millions)	DVR (18–49)	DVR viewers (millions)	Total (18–49)	Total viewers (millions)	Ref.
0	"The Masked Singer & Alter Ego Sneak Peek"	September 12, 2021	Sunday 8:00 p.m.	0.9/6	2.94	—N/a	—N/a	—N/a	—N/a	
1	"The Auditions Begin"	September 22, 2021	Wednesday 9:00 p.m.	0.7/5	2.93	0.1	0.52	0.8	3.46	(Note: Live+7 ratings were not available, so Live+3 ratings have been used instead.)
2	"The Auditions Night 2"	September 23, 2021	Thursday 9:00 p.m.	0.4/3	2.33	0.1	0.37	0.5	2.69	
3	"The Auditions Night 3"	September 29, 2021	Wednesday 9:00 p.m.	0.5/3	2.46	0.1	0.37	0.5	2.83	
4	"The Final Auditions"	October 6, 2021	Wednesday 9:00 p.m.	0.4/3	2.37	0.1	0.40	0.5	2.78	
5	"The Head To Heads Begin"	October 13, 2021	Wednesday 9:00 p.m.	0.5/3	2.32	0.1	0.42	0.5	2.74	
6	"The Head To Heads Night 2"	October 20, 2021	Wednesday 9:00 p.m.	0.4/3	2.17	0.1	0.42	0.5	2.59	
7	"The Head To Heads Night 3"	November 3, 2021	Wednesday 9:00 p.m.	0.4/3	1.96	0.1	0.30	0.4	2.27	
8	"The Last Night of Head to Heads"	November 10, 2021	Wednesday 9:00 p.m.	0.4/3	1.74	0.1	0.33	0.5	2.07	
9	"The Semi-Finals Part 1"	November 17, 2021	Wednesday 9:00 p.m.	0.4/3	2.03	0.1	0.37	0.4	2.40	
10	"The Semi-Finals Part 2"	December 1, 2021	Wednesday 9:00 p.m.	0.4/3	1.89	0.0	0.25	0.4	2.14	
11	"The Finale"	December 8, 2021	Wednesday 9:00 p.m.	0.3/3	2.03	0.1	0.35	0.4	2.38	

== International versions ==
Country/region	Local title	Network	Host(s)	Date aired/premiered
Russia	Avatar	NTV	Vyacheslav Makarov	3 September 2022 – present
Russia	F a n t a s t i k a	Channel One	Vadim Galygin	23 September 2022 – present

== See also ==
- Virtual band
- Virtual concert
