= Pit Viper (sunglasses) =

Eyewear company based in Utah

- Type: Private
- Industry: Sunglasses; Clothing; Sports equipment
- Founded: 2012; 14 years ago
- Founder: Chuck Mumford, Chris Garcin
- Headquarters: South Salt Lake, Utah, United States
- Key people: Charles Mumford, Chris Garcin
- Website: https://pitviper.com/

Pit Viper is an American company based in South Salt Lake, Utah. The company designs, develops, and manufactures sports performance equipment and lifestyle pieces, including sunglasses, safety glasses, eyeglasses, sports visors, and ski/snowboard goggles, utilizing a 1980s, 1990s, and early 2000s aesthetic combined with an irreverent, absurdist marketing approach.

== History ==
The company was founded in 2012 by Chuck Mumford, who began by modifying military surplus ballistic sunglasses (made in the early 1990s) and reselling them under the brand 'Pit Viper', based on a nickname he earned while skiing. He soon partnered with Chris Garcin to produce stickers for the glasses, and they began creating an online storefront and perfected the social media marketing approach for which they would become known.

When the original military surplus glasses ran out, the company ran a Kickstarter in order to manufacture the glasses in-house. The company met success and, in 2023, was estimated to employ around 100 employees with an annual revenue of around $40 million.

The sunglasses have been featured in skiing publications such as Powder Magazine in addition to larger publications such as the Wall Street Journal.

In addition to skiing, the sunglasses have had significant success in the cycling market, with the company now offering a road cycling kit and, more recently, launching a mountain bike apparel collection.

The company has attracted the following of multiple high-profile athletes, including extreme skier Glen Plake and NFL players Patrick Mahomes and Rob Gronkowski as well as freestyle skier Tanner Hall and the first female African American NASCAR Cup pit crew member Brehanna Daniels.
