= American Gladiators (2026 TV series) =

American entertainment gameshow

- Genre: Sports; Game show
- Created by: Dan Carr; John Ferraro
- Directed by: Ramy Romany
- Presented by: Mike "The Miz" Mizanin; Rocsi Diaz
- Starring: Thomas Taylor; Robin Delorenzo; Mike Sydara; The Gladiators
- Narrated by: Chris Rose
- Theme music composer: Jelly Roll
- Opening theme: "Rise Up" (short version)
- Ending theme: "Rise Up"
- Country of origin: United States
- No. of seasons: 1
- No. of episodes: 10

Production
- Executive producers: John Ferraro; Barry Poznick; Daniel Calin; Mark Burnett; Susan Janis-Mashayekhi; Sarah Happel Jackson; Adam Cooper
- Production locations: Aren'Ice, Cergy, Val-d'Oise, France
- Camera setup: Multi-camera
- Running time: 42 minutes
- Production companies: Flor-Jon Films; MGM Television; Evolution Media; Big Fish Entertainment; Amazon MGM Studios

Original release
- Network: Prime Video
- Release: April 17, 2026 – present

Related
- American Gladiators (U.S.A., 1989–1996); Gladiators 2000 (U.S.A., 1994–1996); American Gladiators (U.S.A., 2008); Gladiators (2024–)

American Gladiators is an American TV competition series based on the original American Gladiators. It is aired on Prime Video in over 240 countries and territories, and is being hosted by WWE SmackDown wrestler Mike "The Miz" Mizanin.

Filming for the first two seasons occurred during Summer 2025 at Aren'Ice in Cergy, France, the first time American Gladiators is filmed entirely outside of its national borders. The first season of the series premiered on April 17, 2026.

Each episode features 4 everyday contestants (2 male Contenders and 2 female Contenders) battling for a $100,000 grand prize at the end of the season and the title of American Gladiator Champion.

The 10-part first season aired across three weeks exclusively on Prime Video.

== Background ==
In April 2024, it was reported the creator of the original American Gladiators brand, John Ferraro, had signed Range Sports as a representative to develop new "TV, film, attractions, merchandise and live events" within the American Gladiators franchise. This decision was accelerated by the success of the British reboot of Gladiators on BBC One, which reached nearly 10 million viewers in total during its first series and was quickly renewed for its second and third series, alongside going for its first-ever Live Arena Tour across the country.

In June 2024, it was officially reported that the reboot, produced by Amazon MGM Studios, had been ordered by Prime Video, and set to air in over 200 countries worldwide. In May 2025, it was announced that professional wrestler and presenter Mike "The Miz" Mizanin would host the reboot, which was filmed in summer 2025 near Paris, France, in front of a French audience of approximately 3,000.

On June 12, 2025, it was reported that The Miz would be joined by Rocsi Diaz as sideline reporter and play-by-play commentator Chris Rose. Simultaneously, the full roster of 16 Gladiators was officially revealed. The action on the arena will be overseen by the Head referee, Wisconsin-based professional boxing referee Thomas "Tom" Taylor.

== Format ==
Signs of a possible American reboot of the franchise were seen after the hit success of the BBC's reboot of their British adaptation, Gladiators, which has already been commissioned for a fourth series by Spring 2026.

The show's format follows the premise of the previous iterations of American Gladiators, wherein ordinary members of the public, or Contenders, battle against elite athletes, known as Gladiators, in a set of physically demanding events requiring strength, stamina and speed. Season 1 of the revival features 24 contenders going up against the 16 resident Gladiators of the show, in an elimination format consisting of preliminary heats, semi-finals and finals. The contenders first have to gain points in three events that transfer to an advantage for the final round, The Eliminator, at the end of each episode.

The contenders ultimately battle it out for the grand prize of $100,000, which only one male and one female contender earn at the end of the season.

== Cast and crew ==
=== Presenters ===
- Mike "The Miz" Mizanin is the host. Known from appearing weekly on the WWE's SmackDown brand under the ring name "The Miz".
- Rocsi Diaz serves as the sideline reporter & co-host, explaining the events rules and Gladiator statistics alongside The Miz.

=== The Gladiators ===
The cast of Gladiators include professional wrestlers, bodybuilders, CrossFit as well as former D1 athletes.

On June 11, 2025, the first two male Gladiators of the lineup were revealed as former WWE wrestler Eric Bugenhagen, and former 2 time TNA world tag team champion, and star of Big Brother and House of Villains Jessie Godderz. On June 12, the rest of the total 16-strong roster were first revealed by Prime Video and The Hollywood Reporter. The rest of the Gladiators include Texas-born CrossFit Games champion Dani Speegle.

Female Gladiators
Alias	Name	Seasons	Age	Stats	State	Background
Blaze	Abigail Lay	1–		6'0", 185 lbs (1.83 m, 84 kg)	MO	Fitness coach and bodybuilder; Women's volleyball player
Crush	Dani Speegle	1–	32	5'6", 170 lbs (1.67 m, 77 kg)	TX	Six-time CrossFit Games athlete; The Titan Games Season 2 winner; Competitive gymnast
Empire	Lu Faustin	1–		5'8", 150 lbs (1.72 m, 68 kg)	NY	Personal trainer and IFBB Figure Pro bodybuilder; Miss Fitness Belgium winner
Huntress	Sydney Hunter	1–		5'6", 140 lbs (1.67 m, 64 kg)	CA	Former Division I track & field athlete; Powerlifter
Hurricane	Kailey Latimer	1–	34	5'10", 160 lbs (1.78 m, 73 kg)	NC	AEW and former NWA Professional wrestler, "Kamille"; NPC Bodybuilding Champion; Softball and arena football player
Striker	Emily Nelson	1–		6'4 3/4", 192 lbs (1.94 m, 87 kg)	AZ	Personal trainer; Former NCAA Division I basketball player
Supernova	Jessica Roden	1–	34	5'11", 170 lbs (1.80 m, 77 kg)	OH	Professional wrestler, "J-Rod" (JCW, OVW); Softball and volleyball player; Gymnast
Voltage	Daniella Means	1–		5'5", 140 lbs (1.65 m, 64 kg)	CA	IFBB Pro bodybuilder and World Powerlifting Champion; Hong Kong professional 7's rugby player

Male Gladiators
Alias	Name	Seasons	Age	Stats	State	Background
Ace	Drew Aggouras	1–		6'3", 210 lbs (1.90 m, 95 kg)	MA	Fitness coach; Soccer player
The Bull	Eric Bugenhagen	1–	38	6'3", 285 lbs (1.90 m, 129 kg)	WI	Retired WWE and collegiate wrestler; "Rick Boogs"; YouTuber
Eagle	Jason Peele	1–		6'4", 250 lbs (1.93 m, 113 kg)	NC	Powerlifter and long distance runner; Tactical U.S. Military trainer
Fang	Michael Wardlow	1–	38	6'3", 265 lbs (1.91 m, 120 kg)	OH	AEW Professional wrestler, "Wardlow"; Bodybuilder
Lightning	Joseph Hall	1–		6'5", 250 lbs (1.96 m, 113 kg)	CA	Former American football player; U.S. Marine; Bodybuilder
Mayhem	Faysal Shafaat	1–	35	6'5", 240 lbs (1.96 m, 109 kg)	FL	Former Division I football player; Reality TV contestant (Big Brother, The Challenge American Ninja Warrior)
Neon	Ayinde Warren	1–		6'2", 220 lbs (1.88 m, 100 kg)	MD	Fitness coach and model; Division I footballer
Steel	Jessie Godderz	1–	40	5'10", 205 lbs (1.78 m, 93 kg)	CA	TNA and OVW professional wrestler; Reality TV contestant (House of Villains, Big Brother)

=== The Referees ===
Wisconsin-born Thomas "Tom" Taylor serves as the head referee, alongside referees Robin Delorenzo and Mike Sydara.

=== Commentator ===
Chris Rose, known as being a long-term announcer on NFL and many game shows like BattleBots is the commentator, announcing the action live from the arena.

== Events ==
The rebooted series of American Gladiators will see the return of many classical events such as "Atlasphere", "Gauntlet", "Hang Tough" and "Joust", as well as addition of some brand-new events to the American format. Each episode is set to culminate with "The Eliminator" obstacle course ending with the iconic "Travelator".

=== Season 1 ===
==== Atlasphere ====
American Gladiators classic Atlasphere is returning, featuring contestants versus Gladiators in big metal "spheres", with the contestants' objective of scoring as many points as possible by rolling over several scoring pods across the arena floor.

===== Atlasphere: Crash Course =====
A modified version of Atlasphere, coming from the British Gladiators reboot. Crash Course is a 2-lap race to the finish line with gladiators in the contestants' way. Winner gets 10 points and Runner-up gets 5, as long as the Runner-up crosses the finish line before time is up. Once a winner is declared, the runner-up must complete the course 10 seconds after their opponent wins or no points are rewarded.

==== Collision ====
In this brand new event taken from the BBC revival, the Contender has just 60 seconds to try to cross a giant suspension bridge and put as many colored balls into two baskets on the platforms with each shot made worth two points with a maximum 10 points if the Contender can make 5 successful shots, while four Gladiators are trying to knock them off the bridge by swinging on their trapezes from two separate platforms on the sides of the bridge.

==== The Gauntlet ====
Another classic, The Gauntlet, sees each contestant trying to get past a group of 4 Gladiators each in a Zone armed with foam weapons in a narrow, "gauntlet" shaped running track. Each zone the contender clears is worth 2 points and reaching the end point of the track awards an additional 2 points for a maximum score of 10 points. In the Semi-Finals, as a "Level Up" special, a fifth gladiator is added to the competition, upon reaching the 'Impact Zone', the competitor must get the Gladiator to step out of the zone for an additional 3 points before time runs out.

==== Hang Tough ====
This classic sees the contestant and the Gladiator start from opposite platforms, swinging using gymnastics rings. The aim for the contestant is to get to the Gladiator's platform to claim full points, while this is trying to remove the contestant off the rings. 10 points if the contender gets to the opposite podium, and zero if they get caught by the Gladiator. 5 points for staying in the scoring zone.

==== Joust ====
A true American Gladiators classic in which the Contender must try knock the Gladiator down from the podium using a pugil stick in a head-to-head combat with the Gladiator, who is attempting to do the same thing to the Contender. 10 points are awarded if the Contender removes the Gladiator or if the Gladiator crosses over and steps on the Contender's platform, 5 points are awarded if the Contender can last the entire 60 seconds without dropping and no points if the Gladiator removes the Contender.

==== Powerball ====
The iconic game mix of Basketball and American Football, in which the contestants playing at the same time must score as many points as possibly by placing coloured balls into several pods spread across the arena floor. Three of the Gladiators are trying to tackle them down to avoid scoring.

==== The Edge ====
In this brand-new event taken from the UK BBC revival, taking place high up on the arena ceiling, the contender and Gladiator play a game of cat-and-mouse on a giant suspended grid-shaped platform. The aim for the contender is to cross the platforms as many times as possible within 60 seconds, while the Gladiator tries to rugby-style tackle them off into a chilling 40 feet drop. Each crossing from the contender earns them 2 points with a maximum limit of 10 points.

==== The Ring ====
An all-new game originated from the British reboot on BBC. In a game of cat-and-mouse and wrestling, the contenders have 60 seconds to make it to a central button at the arena floor. Guarding the target are a pair of Gladiators with the aim of stopping them on the way. The contender will pick up 2 points every time they touch the button and any part of their body touching the button counts.

In the Finals, a special "Level Up" version has the three finalists facing off against three Gladiators where only the first 2 Contenders to tap the button will continue in the competition while the third is eliminated immediately.

==== The Wall ====
In the classical, rock climbing-styled event, the contenders are being pursued by the Gladiators up a high, vertical wall. To score 10 points, the contenders must reach the top of the wall without being pulled off. In the Semi-Finals, contenders only get a 5-second or 6-second (episode nine) head start and the Wall is bigger to scale.

==== Whiplash ====
Classic game of Tug of War where the contender and the Gladiator are attached with a "dogbone", and the contender must remove the Gladiator from a circular play area. 10 for dispatching the gladiator off the play area.

This event has so far only been played in one heat during Season 1.

==== The Eliminator ====
The final legendary game at the end of each episode, an obstacle course determining the advancing/winning contestants. A race through demanding obstacle course of balance beams and cargo nets, ending with "The Travelator".

== Episodes ==
=== Season 1 (2026) ===
No.	Title	Original release date
1	"Heat 1"	April 17, 2026
A new generation of Contenders step into the Gladiator Arena to take on 16 new Gladiators in Whiplash, Powerball, Joust, and The Eliminator.
2	"Heat 2"	April 17, 2026
New contenders clash with the Gladiators in Collision, The Ring, Hang Tough, and The Eliminator.
3	"Heat 3"	April 17, 2026
Four new contenders take on The Wall, The Gauntlet, The Edge, and The Eliminator in a night packed with surprises.
4	"Heat 4"	April 24, 2026
Power meets precision in The Gauntlet, The Edge, The Wall, and The Eliminator - where tactics and toughness collide.
5	"Heat 5"	April 24, 2026
Four new contenders face unstoppable Gladiators in Atlasphere, Hang Tough, Collision, and The Eliminator.
6	"Heat 6"	April 24, 2026
The final prelims bring Joust, Powerball, Atlasphere, and The Eliminator - with wildcards and surprises ahead.
7	"Semi-Final 1"	May 1, 2026
The semifinals begin with a Leveled-Up version of The Wall, The Edge, and a Joust match that screams "Welcome to the Semis!" The road to the finale starts here.
8	"Semi-Final 2"	May 1, 2026
The second semifinal raises the stakes with Gauntlet Level Up, Hang Tough, The Ring, and The Eliminator.
9	"Semi-Final 3"	May 1, 2026
Second chances meet semifinal stakes in Atlasphere Crash Course, The Wall, The Edge, and The Eliminator.
10	"The Finals"	May 1, 2026
The finalists face off in The Ring, Joust, Hang Tough, and The Eliminator - for $100,000 and the title of Champion.

== Results ==
=== Heat 1 ===
- Female Gladiators: Blaze, Crush, Empire, Huntress & Hurricane
- Male Gladiators: Eagle, Fang, Mayhem, Neon & Steel

Females
Events	Contenders		Gladiators
Events	Francheska Martinez	Ayonna Procter	Gladiators
Whiplash	10	0	Blaze / Hurricane
Powerball	2	4	Empire, Crush & Huntress
Joust	10 (Note: Hurricane was disqualified for putting her hand on the contender's podium.)	0	Hurricane / Blaze
Final Score	22	4	
Headstart	9.0s		
Result	Loss	Win	

Males
Events	Contenders		Gladiators
Events	Exodus Rodgers	Tavares Chambliss	Gladiators
Whiplash	0	10	Eagle / Steel
Powerball	4	2	Eagle, Neon & Mayhem
Joust	0	0	Fang (Note: Fang's debut event Joust. Made a special entrance by descending down the Wall.) / Neon
Final Score	4	12	
Headstart		4.0s	
Result	Loss	Win	

=== Heat 2 ===
- Female Gladiators: Blaze, Crush, Empire, Huntress, Hurricane & Voltage
- Male Gladiators: Ace, The Bull, Eagle, Mayhem, Neon & Steel

Females
Events	Contenders		Gladiators
Events	Sierra Dawn Anglim	Janelle Schaefer	Gladiators
Collision	8	8	Huntress, Blaze, Empire & Voltage
The Ring	4	0	Blaze & Hurricane
Hang Tough	10	0	Crush / Blaze
Final Score	22	8	
Headstart	7.0s		
Result	Loss	Win	

Males
Events	Contenders		Gladiators
Events	Steffan Jones	Evan Barr	Gladiators
Collision	4	8	Neon, The Bull, Ace & Steel
The Ring	0	4	Eagle & Ace
Hang Tough	0	0	Eagle / Mayhem
Final Score	4	12	
Headstart		4.0s	
Result	Loss	Win	

=== Heat 3 ===
- Female Gladiators: Crush, Empire, Huntress, Hurricane & Voltage
- Male Gladiators: Ace, The Bull, Mayhem, Neon & Steel

Females
Events	Contenders		Gladiators
Events	Bailey Meraviglia	Karizma Lockhart	Gladiators
The Wall	0	10	Crush & Voltage
The Gauntlet	10	10	Voltage, Empire, Hurricane & Huntress
The Edge	0	10	Hurricane / Huntress
Final Score	10	30	
Headstart		10.0s	
Result	Win	Loss	

Males
Events	Contenders		Gladiators
Events	Jaquez Jones	Michael Miraglia	Gladiators
The Wall	0	10	Mayhem & Neon
The Gauntlet	10	4	Neon, Ace, Mayhem & The Bull
The Edge	4	10	Ace / Steel
Final Score	14	24	
Headstart		5.0s	
Result	Loss (Note: Jaquez suffered a pectoral injury during The Edge and was deemed medically unfit to continue in the competition.)	WC (Note: After the elimination of Jaquez was confirmed, Michael was told he would not run the Eliminator on the night, and a twist was revealed. At the end of the preliminary heats, Michael will face against the eliminated male contender with fastest Eliminator time with his 5 second head start.)	

=== Heat 4 ===
- Female Gladiators: Blaze, Crush, Empire, Huntress, Hurricane & Voltage
- Male Gladiators: Ace, The Bull, Eagle, Mayhem, Neon & Steel

Females
Events	Contenders		Gladiators
Events	Michelle Keith	Fallon Fratone	Gladiators
The Gauntlet	10	10	Hurricane, Voltage, Empire & Crush
The Edge	2	6	Hurricane / Huntress
The Wall	0	0	Crush & Blaze
Final Score	12	16	
Headstart		2.0s	
Result	Win	Loss (Note: Despite finishing the Eliminator first, Fallon was disqualified after using the sides of the Travelator to pull herself up.)	

Males
Events	Contenders		Gladiators
Events	Ben Galper	Bobby Levine	Gladiators
The Gauntlet	10	6	Ace, Neon, Mayhem & The Bull
The Edge	2	2	Neon / Steel
The Wall	10	0	Steel & Eagle
Final Score	22	8	
Headstart	7.0s		
Result	Win	Loss (Note: Since Bobby had the fastest time in the Eliminator for the losing male players, he was given a wildcard opportunity to face Michael Miraglia for the third spot in the Semi-Finals.)	

=== Heat 5 ===
- Female Gladiators: Blaze, Crush, Empire, Huntress, Hurricane & Voltage
- Male Gladiators: Ace, The Bull, Eagle, Fang, Mayhem & Steel

Females
Events	Contenders		Gladiators
Events	Rebecca Clements	Jordan Szecw	Gladiators
Atlasphere	4	2	Huntress / Crush
Hang Tough	0	5	Crush / Hurricane
Collision	0	6	Huntress, Blaze, Empire & Voltage
Final Score	4	13	
Headstart		4.5s	
Result	Loss (Note: Rebecca had the fastest time in the Eliminator for the losing female players, and would return in the next episode when she was given a wildcard opportunity to face Terri Bell for the Semi-Finals.)	Win	

Males
Events	Contenders		Gladiators
Events	Austin Liu	Andy Stern	Gladiators
Atlasphere	2	2	Fang / The Bull
Hang Tough	0	0	Ace / Mayhem
Collision	6 (Note: Austin lost a point after throwing the ball from the bridge into the basket.)	0	The Bull, Steel, Eagle & Ace
Final Score	8	2	
Headstart	3.0s		
Result	Win	Loss	

=== Heat 6 ===
- Female Gladiators: Crush, Empire, Huntress, Hurricane & Voltage
- Male Gladiators: The Bull, Mayhem, Neon & Steel

Females
Events	Contenders		Gladiators
Events	Terri Bell	Ilana Sedaka	Gladiators
Joust	5	0	Crush
Powerball	0	2	Voltage, Huntress & Hurricane
Atlasphere	2	4	Huntress / Empire
Final Score	7	6	
Headstart	0.5s		
Result	WC (Note: Terri did not run the Eliminator to settle her heat, and instead went into a winner-take-all Wild Card race.)	Loss (Note: Ilana was seriously injured during the Atlasphere game and deemed unfit for competition.)	

Males
Events	Contenders		Gladiators
Events	Ben Afuvai/Kyle Bernier	Blake Wright	Gladiators
Joust	10	5 (Note: Since the Bull touched his opponents podium before Blake landed from the podium to the ground, the results were a tie.)	The Bull
Powerball	6 (Note: Ben received a leg injury during the game and could not continue. Kyle Bernier was then chosen on the spot to replace him as the new alternate contestant.)	0	Neon, Mayhem & Steel
Atlasphere	6	0	The Bull / Mayhem
Final Score	22	5	
Headstart	7.0s		
Result	Win	Loss	

Womens Wildcard
Events	Contenders	
Events	Terri Bell	Rebecca Clement
Headstart	0.5s	
Result	Loss	Win

Mens Wildcard
Events	Contenders	
Events	Bobby Levine	Michael Miraglia
Headstart		5.0s
Result	Loss	Win

=== Semi-final 1 ===
- Female Gladiators: Blaze, Crush, Empire, Hurricane & Supernova
- Male Gladiators: Ace, The Bull, Eagle, Fang & Mayhem

Females
Events	Contenders		Gladiators
Events	Janelle Schaefer	Ayonna Proctor	Gladiators
The Edge	2	0	Hurricane / Empire
The Wall	0	10	Crush / Supernova (Note: This was Supernova's debut.)
Joust	5	10 (Note: Supernova was disqualified for stepping on her opponents podium.)	Blaze / Supernova
Final Score	7	20	
Headstart		6.5s	
Result	Loss	Win	

Males
Events	Contenders		Gladiators
Events	Evan Barr	Tavares Chambliss	Gladiators
The Edge	8	4	Ace / Eagle
The Wall	0	0	Fang / The Bull
Joust	0	0	Eagle / Mayhem
Final Score	8	4	
Headstart	2.0s		
Result	Win	Loss	

=== Semi-final 2 ===
- Female Gladiators: Blaze, Crush, Empire, Huntress, Hurricane, Supernova & Voltage
- Male Gladiators: Ace, The Bull, Eagle, Fang, Lightning, Mayhem & Neon

Females
Events	Contenders		Gladiators
Events	Bailey Meraviglia	Michelle Keith	Gladiators
The Gauntlet: Level Up	10	10	Crush, Voltage, Empire & Huntress + Hurricane
Hang Tough	0	0	Crush / Voltage
The Ring	8	10	Blaze / Supernova
Final Score	18	20	
Headstart		1.0s	
Result	Win	Loss	

Males
Events	Contenders		Gladiators
Events	Ben Galper	Michael Miraglia	Gladiators
The Gauntlet: Level Up	10	10	Lightning, Neon, The Bull & Ace + Fang (Note: This was Lightning's debut event.)
Hang Tough	10 (Note: Neon fell to the mats during Hang Tough.)	10	Neon / Eagle
The Ring	0	0	Lightning / Mayhem
Final Score	20	20	
Headstart (Note: Since both competitors were tied in points, no one gets a head start.)			
Result	Win (Note: Ben broke the fastest Eliminator time in 59 seconds.)	Loss (Note: Michael fell from the monkey bars during the event, setting him back 10 seconds.)	

=== Semi-final 3 ===
- Female Gladiators: Crush, Empire, Huntress, Hurricane & Striker
- Male Gladiators: Ace, Fang, Lightning, Mayhem, Neon & Steel

Females
Events	Contenders		Gladiators
Events	Rebecca Clements	Terri Bell (Note: Jordan Szecw, who qualified for the Semi-Finals, withdrew following an injury during the preliminaries.)	Gladiators
Atlasphere: Crash Course	10	5	Empire / Striker (Note: This was Striker's debut.)
The Wall	10	0	Crush / Striker
The Edge	4	0	Huntress / Hurricane
Final Score	24	9	
Headstart	9.5s		
Result	Win	Loss	

Males
Events	Contenders		Gladiators
Events	Austin Liu	Kyle Bernier	Gladiators
Atlasphere: Crash Course	5	10	Lightning / Fang
The Wall	0	0	Ace / Mayhem
The Edge	2	4	Steel / Neon
Final Score	7	14	
Headstart		3.5s	
Result	Loss	Win	

=== Final ===
- Female Gladiators: Blaze, Crush, Hurricane, Striker & Voltage
- Male Gladiators: The Bull, Eagle, Fang, Lightning, Mayhem, Neon & Steel

Females
Events	Contenders			Gladiators
Events	Ayonna Proctor	Bailey Meraviglia	Rebecca Clements	Gladiators
The Ring: Level Up	2	OUT	2	Blaze / Crush / Hurricane
Joust	5	-	0	Crush / Striker
Hang Tough	5	-	10 (Note: Voltage fell to the mats during Hang Tough.)	Hurricane / Voltage
Final Score	12	-	12	
Headstart (Note: Since both competitors were tied in points, no one gets a head start.)				
Result	Runner-Up	-	Winner	

Males
Events	Contenders			Gladiators
Events	Evan Barr	Ben Galper	Kyle Bernier	Gladiators
The Ring: Level Up	2	OUT	2	Lightning / Mayhem / Neon
Joust	0	-	0 (Note: Kyle was disqualified for touching his opponents podium.)	Fang / The Bull
Hang Tough	0	-	10	Eagle / Steel
Final Score	2	-	12	
Headstart			5.0s	
Result	Winner	-	Runner-Up (Note: Despite finishing the Eliminator first, Kyle was disqualified for stepping on the center pad while running up the Travelator.)	
