= Rocsi Diaz =

American television and radio personality

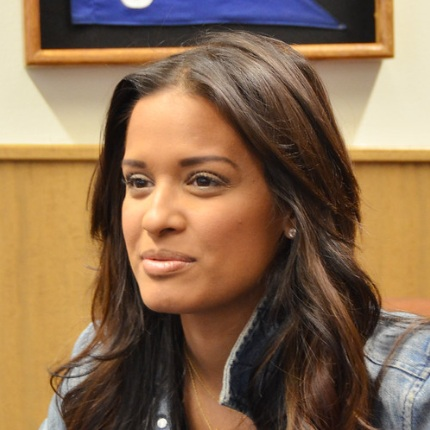
- Rocsi Diaz in September 2012
- Born: Raquel Roxanne Diaz; November 17, 1981 (age 44); Tegucigalpa, Honduras
- Other name: Lady of 106, Roczilla
- Education: Nicholls State University
- Occupations: radio personality, television personality, model, actress
- Years active: 2002–present

Raquel Roxanne "Rocsi" Diaz (born November 17, 1981, also known simply as Rocsi) is a Honduran-born American television host, radio personality, model and actress. She is best known from her time spent as a co-host on BET’s music video countdown program 106 & Park from 2006–2012. She was then a correspondent on Entertainment Tonight from 2012–2014.

== Early life ==
Diaz was born in Tegucigalpa, Honduras, but moved with her family to New Orleans, Louisiana. She is of Honduran and Chilean descent. Rocsi announced on 106 & Park on July 30, 2009, that she suffered from anorexia during her middle and high school years. She was an avid cheerleader during those years, as well. She graduated from West Jefferson High School in Harvey, Louisiana. She graduated from Nicholls State University in nearby Thibodaux, Louisiana.

== Career ==
After growing up in New Orleans, she launched her career in Dallas, Texas, as a host on hip-hop radio station KBFB 97.9 The Beat. At the station, Rocsi cultivated a unique, street-smart style that caught the attention of Boston's Hot 97.7, where she later became a DJ. In 2004, she moved to Chicago where she was hired as midday-hour DJ at radio station Power 92 WPWX-FM, and was known as "The Midday Mami".

=== Television ===
Diaz appeared on MTV's Fear as a contestant in 2000.

BET personalities AJ Calloway and Free left the network on July 28, 2005. They were replaced by Big Tigger and Julissa Bermudez. They left and Rocsi joined on July 6, 2006, winning the role of co-host of BET's 106 & Park along with Terrence J. The show can be seen in over 85 million homes in U.S., United Kingdom, Canada, Africa, Caribbean, and Japan. For the debut in Japan, she and co-host Terrence J taped footage there, and appeared on MTV Video Music Awards Japan. In 2007, Rocsi starred as a BET News correspondent in Def Jam: Icon, but only appears in cutscenes on TV and not in fighting mode.

On 19 November 2012, Diaz joined Entertainment Tonight as a daily correspondent and weekend co-host. In June 2014, Diaz was awarded a Daytime Emmy award as part of the cast for Outstanding Entertainment News Program. On 17 September 2014, Diaz was let go from the show as CNN's Nischelle Turner was hired.

In August 2013, she was recognised by the National Council of La Raza: Nuestro Pueblo. She received the Ruben Salazar Award for Communications.

On 23 January 2015, Diaz announced she had been hired by CNN's HLN. She is the Los Angeles contributor to their show The Daily Share that airs from 12–5 pm EST.

In August 2015, she marked the ten year anniversary of Hurricane Katrina by returning home with cameras. She showed how her childhood street was bare of homes.

Diaz serves as the host to the third season of Dating Naked on VH1 replacing the original two-seasoned host Amy Paffrath.

Diaz provided color commentary for Cannonball on the USA Network alongside Mike “The Miz” Mizanin, who called the play-by-play. She reunited with Mizanin on Amazon Prime's 2026 relaunch of American Gladiators as a sideline reporter.

In 2021, she became the host of the new Fox reality singing competition Alter Ego.

== Personal life ==
She has been a vegetarian since college and appeared in a PETA ad campaign promoting the diet.

== Filmography ==
=== Film ===
Year	Title	Role	Notes
2012	Gangs of Roses 2: Next Generation	Kate	
2013	The Last Letter	Claudia	
2014	Beyond the Lights	Herself	
2015	Soul Ties	Paula	
2016	The Bounce Back	Herself	
2018	Armed	Maria	
2020	Always and Forever	Miranda Scott	
2024	Dutch II: Angel's Revenge	Angel Charlie	Replacing: Kaya Jackson, Efrangeliz Medina, Geraldine Morena & Bellamane
2025	Dutch III: International Gangster	Angel Charlie	Replacing: Kaya Jackson, Efrangeliz Medina, Geraldine Morena & Bellamane

=== Television ===
Year	Title	Role	Notes
2000	Fear	Herself/Contestant	Contestant: Season 1
2006–12	106 & Park	Herself/Host	Main Host
2008	Red Eye	Herself/Panelist	Episode: "June 17, 2008"
2009	Brothers	Maxi	Episode: "Christmas"
2012–14	Entertainment Tonight	Herself/Correspondent	Main Correspondent
2013	Real Husbands of Hollywood	Herself	Episode: "Hart vs. Mosley"
2014	Hit the Floor	Reporter	Episode: "Unguarded"
2015	The Meredith Vieira Show	Herself/Panelist	Episode: "Episode #1.178"
2016	Hollywood Today Live	Herself/Guest Co-Host	Recurring Guest Co-Host
2016	Dating Naked	Herself/Host	Main Host: Season 3
2018	Hip Hop Squares	Herself/Contestant	Episode: "Rocsi Diaz Vs. Nina Parker"
2018	Ch@tter	Herself/Host	Main Host
2020	Cannonball	Herself/Host	Main Host
2020	The Top Ten Revealed	Herself	Episode: "Episode #3.20" & "#3.22"
2021	The Masked Singer	Herself/Alter Ego Host	Episode: "The Masked Singer & Alter Ego Sneak Peek"
2021	Alter Ego	Herself/Host	Main Host
2022–23	GMA3: What You Need to Know	Herself/Correspondent	Recurring Correspondent
2023	Celebrity Game Face	Herself/Contestant	Episode: "Celebrity Pecker Problems"
2023	Soul of a Nation	Herself	Episode: "Hip Hop @ 50: Rhythms, Rhymes & Reflections"
2023	Ridiculousness	Herself	Recurring Guest: Season 35–37
2024	We Got Time Today	Herself/Co-Host	Main Co-Host
2026	American Gladiators	Herself/Co-Host	Main Co-Host

== See also ==
- List of Afro-Latinos
