= Dani Speegle =

American CrossFit athlete (born 1994)

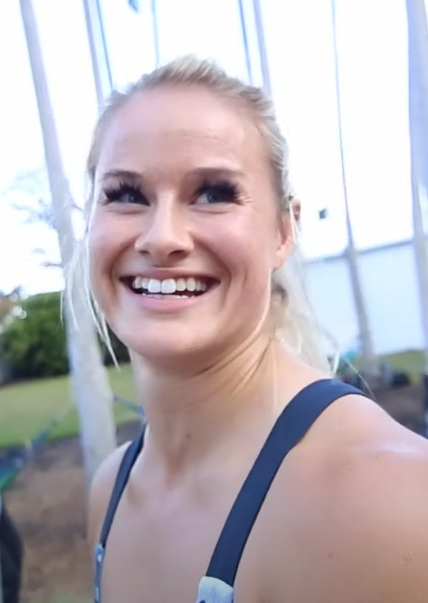
- Dani Speegle in 2019

Personal information
- Born: Dani Elle Speegle; January 10, 1994 (age 32) Houston, Texas, U.S.
- Occupations: CrossFit Games athlete; fitness model; gymnast; television personality
- Height: 5 ft 6 in (168 cm)
- Weight: 165 lb (75 kg)
- Website: dellespeegle

Achievements and titles
- Personal best(s): Back squat 370 lb (168 kg); Clean and jerk 270 lb (122 kg); Deadlift 420 lb (190 kg)

Dani Elle Speegle (born January 10, 1994) is an American six-time CrossFit Games athlete and former competitive gymnast, who placed 13th overall in the 2020 Games. She is generally considered as one of the World's most popular elite CrossFit athletes. She also won the second season of competition show The Titan Games. In June 2025, Speegle was named as one of the Gladiators in the 2026 series American Gladiators, airing on Prime Video.

== Early life ==
Dani Elle Speegle spent her childhood in Houston, Texas, before moving to Colorado. She went to Conifer High School in Conifer, Colorado. Speegle had been a competitive gymnast for 10 years before she was forced to quit due to a back injury, and she tried other sports after she recovered.

She became involved in a number of sports, including volleyball, track, diving and rowing, and she earned five varsity letters in high school. After finishing high school, she went on to study marine biology at the Florida Institute of Technology where she was on the rowing team in her freshman year. In her senior year in college in 2015, she was introduced to CrossFit.

== Career ==
=== CrossFit ===
Speegle started taking part in CrossFit Open in 2016. She made her first appearance in the CrossFit Games in 2019 as the US national champion.

Speegle had her best individual result in 2020 when she reached 13th. She has reached the CrossFit Games six times, five times as an individual athlete, and once as part of a team. The team finished 6th at the 2025 Games. She also finished in the top 10 at the 2019, 2023, 2024 and 2025 Rogue Invitational.

=== Television ===
In 2020, Speegle took part in the second season of Dwayne Johnson's game show The Titan Games. She won the regional finals in episode 3, before she was crowned the champion in the finale.

In 2025, Speegle was chosen to be a gladiator in the Amazon Prime reboot of the American Gladiators, taking the nickname "Crush".

=== Social media ===
Speegle is a social media fitness influencer with 1.9 million followers on Instagram. She introduced the "Girls Who Eat" movement to highlight women's positive relationship with food and their body image.
