= Babushka (game show) =

British quiz show

- Genre: Game show
- Presented by: Rylan Clark
- Country of origin: United Kingdom
- Original language: English
- No. of series: 1
- No. of episodes: 20

Production
- Running time: 60 minutes (inc adverts)
- Production company: STV Studios

Original release
- Network: ITV
- Release: 1 May – 26 May 2017

Babushka is a British game show based on the babushka doll (also known as a matryoshka doll). It aired from 1 to 26 May 2017 on ITV daily at 5 pm as a temporary Spring replacement for The Chase. It was presented by Rylan Clark. On 29 November 2017, ITV announced the show had been cancelled after one series.

== Format ==
There are 10 dolls: Angelina, Anastasia, Katya, Natalya, Nushka, Olya, Sonya, Svetlana, Tatiana and Viktoriya. The team of two must choose eight out of the ten dolls to open in turn. Two are completely empty, two contain £500, two contain £1,000, two more go to £2,000, one goes all the way to £5,000 and the top babushka contains £10,000. Before they may open each doll they are presented with a true or false question. Should they get this correct, they have the chance to open the doll in play, gambling whether to keep opening the successive smaller dolls inside—for example the £10,000 doll would contain smaller dolls worth £500, £1,000, £2,000, £5,000 and £10,000. Other dolls won't contain all of these. If they push their luck too far and reveal nothing inside the current doll they lose any money banked. They can, at any time, stop opening the doll, bank what is currently showing and proceed to the next question. If they answer their question incorrectly, the players will lose all their banked money.

To help, contestants have two lifelines and a third, conditional lifeline: Switch, Peek, and X-ray, respectively. Switch allows the contestants to swap their question and answer a different one. Peek allows them to look at one hidden level of a doll. The X-ray lifeline allows the team to view everything inside one doll, however this is only attained by having banked at least £5,000 by the end of their fourth doll. Lifelines can be used at any point, however only the X-ray can be used on the final doll. If any money is won at the end of the game, the team is offered the choice of taking their money or gambling it all for a chance to double their winnings by selecting the matryoshka doll containing a gold centre. There are two dolls on the table at this stage—one black and one white. The players go home empty-handed if they pick the empty doll, which is revealed on a screen before it is actually opened. The maximum prize money available is £44,000, obtained by fully opening all 8 dolls with money and the final "double" doll.

After a single game has finished, the dolls are randomised for the next two contestants to play in the next game.

== Reception ==
The show was received with a negative reception. Readers of UKGameshows voted it the worst new show in their Poll of 2017.
