= The Titan Games =

Sports competition television program

- Genre: Sports entertainment; Sports competition
- Created by: Dwayne Johnson
- Starring: Dwayne Johnson; Liam McHugh; Alex "Goldenboy" Mendez; Cari Champion
- Country of origin: United States
- Original language: English
- No. of seasons: 2
- No. of episodes: 21

Production
- Executive producers: Dwayne Johnson; Dany Garcia; Arthur Smith; Hiram Garcia; Brian Gewirtz; Toby Gorman; Anthony Storm
- Production locations: Irwindale Event Center Irwindale, California (season 1); Atlanta Metro Studios Union City, Georgia (season 2)
- Production companies: A. Smith & Co. Productions; Seven Bucks Productions; Universal Television Alternative Studio

Original release
- Network: NBC
- Release: January 3, 2019 – August 10, 2020

The Titan Games is an American sports competition reality series which aired on NBC from January 3, 2019 to August 10, 2020. Hosted by Dwayne Johnson, the series is loosely based on Greek mythology and features people from across America competing in endurance-based mental and physical challenges of "epic proportions" for the title of Titan. It was produced by Arthur Smith's company A. Smith & Co. in association with the Universal Television Alternative Studio. At the end of the season, Titans will compete to "become the last male and female standing." The show is marketed with the tagline, "Titans aren't born, They're Made."

On September 16, 2019, NBC renewed the series for a second season, which premiered on May 25, 2020.

== Development ==
When announced by NBC in February 2018, the press release claimed it would be similar to NBC's 2008 remake of American Gladiators where contenders try to defeat an existing Titan, but this is not the case; newly-victorious Titans try to defend their titles in future episodes.

Competition obstacles were inspired by Johnson's personal workouts.

== Format ==
=== Season One ===
In each episode, four male and four female contestants compete to be named Titans. In each of four preliminary heats, two men or two women compete head-to-head; the two male winners and two female winners then compete on an obstacle course named Mount Olympus. However, the loser would take the winners' place if the winner suffers an injury and retires after winning the preliminary race.

One male and one female Titan were crowned, winning $100,000 each.

=== Season Two ===
The United States is divided into three regions: East, West, and Central. In the regional rounds, two male and two female contestants from that region compete in two preliminary heats (three if tied), and the one male winner and one female winner race on Mount Olympus side-by-side against Johnson's handpicked Pro Titans:

- Joe Thomas - Former NFL player and 10-time Pro Bowler / NFL Network Host
- Claressa Shields - Middleweight boxing champion
- Tyron Woodley - UFC champion
- Hannah Teter - Olympic gold medalist snowboarder
- Victor Cruz - NFL Super Bowl champion
- Jessie Graff - stuntwoman and American Ninja Warrior veteran.

If a contestant beats the Pro Titan in their Mount Olympus race, they take their place as the Titan of their gender and region and defend their title in subsequent episodes' Mount Olympus race, as the Pro Titan did.

In the regional finals, defeated Titans and contestants who lost Mount Olympus races return to compete in single elimination events. The final contestant runs Mount Olympus against the defending Titan for the regional championship.

The three men and three women who win their regional championships compete in the finale.

== Preliminary Events ==
=== Introduced in Season 1 ===
- Atlas Smash: Contestants race to haul up two large concrete balls 25 feet. Each has the option to whittle down the balls with a large hammer to reduce the weight they need to lift.
- Cyclone: Contestants race to knock down five pillars, each two stories tall, with a 60-lb wrecking ball.
- Hammering Ram: Contestants use 10 lb hammers to pound against a metal plate, releasing a 350-lb battering ram to knock down a wooden door. The person who knocks it down first will then grab the victory chain.
  - Championship Variation: Contestants had to first release the sledgehammer from underneath three 100-pound boxes. They then had to use the sledgehammer to pound two metal plates, each releasing half of the battering ram.
- Heavy Metal: Contestants must drag 350 pounds of metal chains up a 30-foot incline, with the weight being progressively added on with each step. After they reach the top, they must crank up a 100-lb block.
- Herculean Pull: Contestants race to pull out two 100-lb poles from a central structure, then move on to pull out the golden pole that is 9.5 feet above the ground, a blind tug of war with the other contestant.
- Lunar Impact: Contestants must climb up a ladder that is two stories high, then push against a large metal wall with their opponent on the other side. The one to overpower the other and push them off the platform wins.
- Off the Rails: Contestants must pull themselves on a 200-pound sled along a 60-foot rail, collecting 50-pound beams along the way. By the end, they are pulling 600 pounds. They then have to turn around and go back across the rail by throwing and hooking an anchor, then pulling the sled forward. The first one to pull the victory chain wins.
- Power Vault: Contestants use large metal poles to vault across five 15-foot gaps, then push over 750 pounds of weight to uncover a golden pole. They then must race back across the same gaps, plant the pole, and climb up it to pull the victory chain.
- Tower Drop: Contestants race up a large tower, having to pull out seven 15-foot poles as they ascend. Once they reach the top, they must pull out the golden pole wedged underneath a 50-lb ball. After pulling it out, they can pull the victory chain at the top of the tower.
- Uprising: Contestants are each strapped to a 40-pound anvil. They must run forward to lift the anvil to break through a series of concrete barriers, and the anvil must be driven up at a speed of at least 10 mph (16 km/h). The third barrier consists of two concrete slabs. After all slabs are broken, the momentum should enable them to pull the victory chain.
  - Championship Variation: The second, third, and fourth barriers are all two concrete slabs thick.
- Vortex: Contestants race to raise up a large spider web-esque vortex of chains, before ascending the structure to reach the top. Some segments have metal bars making it easier to climb, but are placed in a more indirect path. The first to reach the victory chain wins.

=== Introduced in Season 2 ===
- Launch Pad: Each contestant stands on a platform and uses a rope to swing towards four slabs, each weighing 250 pounds, that are suspended on rails in the air, one off each side of the platform. The first contestant to knock all four slabs off the rails wins.
- Nuts and Bolts: Each contestant has a wall weighing nearly 2,000 pounds. Each wall has five poles, in two rows, bearing giant gold and silver bolts; gold bolts weigh 135 pounds while silver bolts weigh 80 pounds. Contestants must unscrew the endcaps securing the bolts to remove them; they must remove all weights on the two upper poles before proceeding to the lower three. When they feel they have removed enough weight, they can run to the other side of the wall, and attempt to rotate it 90°. Upon doing so, the wall will lock in place, allowing the contestant to grab the victory chain; if they cannot, they must return to the other side and remove more weight.
- Over the Edge: Contestants must drag heavy chains to reach a rope attached to a heavy block; the contestants then engage in a game of tug-of-war. The first contestant to pull the block to their end of a central platform wins.
- Kick Out: Contestants climb up to bars in front of three horizontal cylinders perpendicular to the wall and kick the cylinder flush to the wall. The last, golden cylinder is kicked by both contestants from opposite sides.
- Hammer Down: Contestants must remove a sledgehammer under three 100 lb boxes. Then, they must hammer the pins holding three vertical poles. Once the third, golden pole is down, they must climb it at an angle to reach the victory chain.
  - Three-way Variation: When played as a three-way event in the regional finals, the last contestant to finish is eliminated.
- Resistance: Contestants in a square arena are tied together with a rope secured to a center anchor, and must pull against each other to remove five oil barrels from their half over the barrier on the perimeter.

In season two, Herculean Pull and Lunar Impact also returned as events, with Herculean Pull serving as the tiebreaker event for best-of-three contests.

== Mount Olympus ==
In season one, competitors had to overcome a total of seven obstacles:

1. The competitors sprint across the arena to knock over a 1,000-pound wall, then push three 150-pound grates uphill, and walk to the side to proceed forward
2. Contestants then climb over the "Rolling Ascent," a series of large, rotating cylinders.
3. Contestants must scale "The Cliffs," creating their own handholds and footholds.
4. Contestants must use a crank to lift up a 600-pound torch.
5. Contestants must slide down slides, separated by 5-foot, 6-foot, and 7-foot walls, to return to the arena floor.
6. They must drag a sledgehammer attached to a ball-and-chain (250 pounds for men, 200 pounds for women).
7. Finally, they use the sledgehammer to crack open the concrete slab covering the "Titan relic", the show's logo insignia.

The first contestant to place the relic into his or her pedestal, and turn it like a key, so the T-sign logo faces the camera, is declared a Titan.

In the Championship, the weight of the initial wall was increased to 1,200 pounds, and the ball-and-chain weight was increased to 350 pounds for the men and 300 pounds for the women. Also, to access the ball-and-chain, they had to pull on horizontal chains to lift a 500-pound cage.

For season two, the obstacles were updated:

1. Starting Gates: The competitors run over two vertical wedges of different heights, then crawl under a third wedge.
2. Box Flip: Contestants then have to roll a box (three times for men, once for women) and climb on top of it to reach the next obstacle
3. Iron Ascent: Using two reverse-locking grips, contestants lift themselves up an incline by their arms
4. Log Lift: Contestants then have to lift a pillar (200lbs for men, 100lbs for women) up an incline and lock it at the top
5. Sky bridge: By lifting five weights (120lbs for men, ???lbs for women) off a pillar, competitors uncover a rope that drops half of a bridge
6. Crank Down: Following this, they must rotate a 4 armed crank to release the second half of the bridge
7. Cage Crawl: Crossing the bridge allows access to an angled 3 layered cage that contestants have to navigate down twice and up once
8. Drop Zone: Competitors balance is tested by a series of 4 angled ledges that drop under their weight as they descend
9. Ball & Chain: Similar to Season 1, the penultimate test requires aspiring Titans to drag a weighted ball wrapped in chain (300lbs for men, 200lbs for women), and attached sledgehammer, to the end-point
10. Titan Tomb: In order to grab the relic needed for victory, Titans use the sledgehammer to crack through two layers of concrete

Contestants were still required to deliver the Titan seal to a pedestal, place, and turn it for their final time.

== Series overview ==
Season	Premiere	Finale	Male winner	Female winner	Avg. viewers (millions)
1	January 3, 2019	February 28, 2019	James Jean-Louis	Charity Witt	4.85
2	May 25, 2020	August 10, 2020	Matt Chan	Dani Speegle	3.78

== Season 1 ==
=== Contestants ===
Except where noted, source for all names, ages, hometowns, current residences, and occupations:

Contestant	Age	Hometown	Current residence	Occupation
Ben Afuvai	32	American Samoa	Tacoma, Washington	Metal Polisher
Melissa Alcantara	33	Bronx, New York	Venice, California	Personal Trainer
Emily Andzulis	26	Knoxville, Tennessee	Powell, Tennessee	Massage Therapist and MMA Fighter
Sandra Arechaederra	51	Alamo, California	Alamo, California	Yoga and Strength Training Coach
Davy Barnes	28	Lemmon, South Dakota	Phoenix, Arizona	Tile Installation Business Owner
Montez Blair	27	Erial, New Jersey	Santa Monica, California	Business Development Consultant
Jon Brascetta	29	Sicklerville, New Jersey	Sicklerville, New Jersey	Owner and Operator of Martial Arts Dojo
Bridger Buckley	22	Snohomish, Washington	Pullman, Washington	Student
Matt Cable	28	San Diego, California	Great Falls, Montana	Staff Sergeant of the Air National Guard
Mariah Counts	25	San Diego, California	Valley Village, California	CrossFit Gym Manager/Coach
Brehanna Daniels	24	Virginia Beach, Virginia	Charlotte, North Carolina	NASCAR Tire Changer
Shannon Decker	34	Aberdeen, Washington	Santa Monica, California	Personal Trainer and Model
Julie Dudley	50	Jupiter, Florida	Jupiter, Florida	Firefighter Paramedic
Alma Dwumfour	27	Shrewsbury, Massachusetts	Stratford, Connecticut	ICU Nurse
Elisara Edwards	28	Long Beach, California	Anchorage, Alaska	Debt Collector
Breona Evans	27	Atlanta, Georgia	Atlanta, Georgia	Accountant
Mike Evans	25	Gardner, Massachusetts	North Chelmsford, Massachusetts	Construction Worker
Covenant Falana	21	Oyo, Nigeria	Chicago, Illinois	Student
Anthony Fuhrman	30	Erie, Pennsylvania	Brandon, Florida	Active Duty Army and Pro Strongman
Jenessa Goeman	34	Madison, South Dakota	Clearwater, Florida	Radiologic Technologist
Jess Griffith	27	Springfield, Missouri	Ozark, Missouri	Nutrition Specialist and Former Trauma ER Nurse
Jasmin Guinn	23	Berkeley, California	El Sobrante, California	Motion Graphic Designer
Ashley Hawkins	31	Madison, North Carolina	Pleasant Garden, North Carolina	Police Officer
Steven Hoppe	38	Tucson, Arizona	Mesa, Arizona	Firefighter
Kelsey Horton	28	Deadwood, South Dakota	Rapid City, South Dakota	Nurse
Emily Hu	36	Hayward, California	San Mateo, California	Medical Device Researcher
Ashley Huhn	28	Fort Worth, Texas	Denver, Colorado	Special Ed Teacher and Soccer Coach
Josh Ingraham	34	Brunswick, Maine	Cleveland, Ohio	Executive Chef
James Jean-Louis	29	Cambridge, Massachusetts	North Miami Beach, Florida	Truck Driver for Budweiser
Jack Kwan	20	Chicago, Illinois	River Forest, Illinois	Student
Thong La	25	Tampa, Florida	Tampa, Florida	Mechanical Engineer
Erin LaVoie	36	Spokane, Washington	Spokane, Washington	Professional Timbersports Athlete
Kara Lazauskas	27	Neshanic Station, New Jersey	Anaheim, California	Muscle Research Coordinator and Masters Student in Muscle Physiology
Kyle Lucas	28	Dover, Delaware	Colorado Springs, Colorado	Satellite Systems Operator for the U.S. Air Force
Tyler Lucas	25	State College, Pennsylvania	Germany	United States Air Force
Christina Luna	33	Wayne, West Virginia	Colorado Springs, Colorado	Dental Hygienist
Carla Miranda	34	Humacao, Puerto Rico	San Francisco, California	Luxury Hotel Account Manager
Nikkie Neal	26	Redondo Beach, California	El Segundo, California	Fitness Model
Maximus “Nnamdi” Okoye	26	Antioch, California	Los Angeles, California	Investment Management Analyst
Gina Policastro	32	Queens, New York	Queens, New York	Teacher
Ayonna Procter	33	Elba, Alabama	Mariposa, California	Doctor of Physical Therapy
Lauren Regno	25	Modesto, California	Modesto, California	Nursing Student
David Reid	28	Tracy, California	Selma, Texas	Motivational Speaker and Former Army Special Operations Ranger
Tina Rivas	26	Nayarit, Mexico	Seattle, Washington	Architectural Sheet Metal Worker
Quinn Rivera	25	Cody, Wyoming	Cody, Wyoming	Medical Student
Nichole Root	39	Applegate, California	Auburn, California	Private Pre-School Owner
Chris Ruden	27	Coconut Creek, Florida	Coconut Creek, Florida	Youth Motivational Speaker
Christiana Rugloski	21	Camp Verde, Arizona	Lake Jackson, Texas	Horse Riding Clinic Assistant
Frank Sansonetti	40	Brooklyn, New York	Staten Island, New York	Firefighter
Kwame Sarfo	25	Old Bridge, New Jersey	Parlin, New Jersey	Business Analyst
Brad Schaeffer	34	Pottstown, Pennsylvania	Weehawken, New Jersey	Foot and Ankle Surgeon
Melody Schofield	29	Philadelphia, Pennsylvania	Philadelphia, Pennsylvania	Certified Recovery Specialist
Derik Scott	30	St. Louis, Missouri	Los Angeles, California	Attorney and Pro-MMA Fighter
Nika Sedghi	25	Carlsbad, California	San Diego, California	Gas Turbine Mechanical Engineer
Marianne Sheehan	27	Brooklyn, New York	Poultney, Vermont	Volunteer Firefighter, Small Business Owner, and Former Air Force Jet Mechanic
Julian Stewart	32	Spokane, Washington	Spokane, Washington	Real Estate Agent
Robbie Strauss	34	Woodbridge, New Jersey	Brick, New Jersey	Pro Wrestler and Stay-at-home Dad
DJ Townsel	30	Miami, Florida	Celebration, Florida	Yoga Instructor
Angel Villegas	28	Jacksonville, Florida	Jacksonville, Florida	Barbershop Owner
Cole Wadsworth III	32	Peoa, Utah	Draper, Utah	Farmer
Christopher Watts	33	Elizabethtown, Kentucky	Kabul, Afghanistan	Personal Security Contractor
Matthew "Matt" Welbourn	27	Flagstaff, Arizona	Durango, Colorado	Server
Charity Witt	26	Atlanta, Georgia	Suwanee, Georgia	Metabolic Technician
Jackie Wood	30	Long Island, New York	San Antonio, Texas	Swim Coach

=== Episode 1 (Part 1) ===
Contestant	Herculean Pull	Hammering Ram	Uprising	Hammering Ram	Mount Olympus	Mount Olympus
Emily Andzulis	WINNER					WINNER
Ayonna Procter	LOSER					
Mike Evans		LOSER				
James Jean-Louis		WINNER			WINNER	
Ben Afuvai			LOSER			
Anthony Fuhrman			WINNER		LOSER	
Julie Dudley				WINNER		LOSER
Tina Rivas				LOSER		

=== Episode 1 (Part 2) ===
Contestant	Power Vault	Cyclone	Cyclone	Heavy Metal	Mount Olympus	Mount Olympus
Thong La	LOSER					
Quinn Rivera	WINNER					LOSER
Marianne Sheehan		LOSER				
Nikkie Neal		WINNER			LOSER	
Cole Wadsworth III			WINNER			WINNER
David Reid			LOSER			
Charity Witt				WINNER	WINNER	
Mariah Counts				LOSER		

=== Episode 2 ===
Contestant	Lunar Impact	Hammering Ram	Tower Drop	Uprising	Mount Olympus	Mount Olympus
Melissa Alcantara	WINNER (Note: Between Tower Drop and Uprising, Alcantra was forced to withdraw due to having injured her left knee in Lunar Impact. Therefore, Luna took her place in Mount Olympus.)					
Christina Luna	LOSER					LOSER
Robbie Strauss		LOSER				
Bridger Buckley		WINNER			WINNER	
Carla Miranda			LOSER			
Nika Sedghi			WINNER			WINNER
Steven Hoppe				WINNER	LOSER	
Montez Blair				LOSER		

=== Episode 3 ===
Contestant	Heavy Metal	Herculean Pull	Heavy Metal	Atlas Smash	Mount Olympus	Mount Olympus
Josh Ingraham	LOSER					
Christopher Watts	WINNER				WINNER	
Ashley Huhn		LOSER				
Jasmin Guinn		WINNER				LOSER
Jess Griffith			WINNER			WINNER
Erin LaVoie			LOSER			
Maximus Okoye				LOSER		
Frank Sansonetti				WINNER	LOSER	

=== Episode 4 ===
Contestant	Cyclone	Herculean Pull	Cyclone	Lunar Impact	Mount Olympus	Mount Olympus
Kwame Sarfo	LOSER					
Derik Scott	WINNER				WINNER	
Melody Schofield		LOSER				
Christiana Rugloski		WINNER				WINNER
Nichole Root			WINNER			LOSER
Emily Hu			LOSER			
Jack Kwan				WINNER	LOSER	
Chris Ruden				LOSER		

=== Episode 5 ===
Contestant	Uprising	Vortex	Vortex	Off the Rails	Mount Olympus	Mount Olympus
Gina Policastro	LOSER					
Brehanna Daniels	WINNER				LOSER	
Tyler Lucas		WINNER				WINNER
Julian Stewart		LOSER				
Jackie Wood			WINNER		WINNER	
Kelsey Horton			LOSER			
Matt Welbourn				WINNER		LOSER
Kyle Lucas				LOSER		

=== Episode 6 ===
Contestant	Herculean Pull	Hammering Ram	Vortex	Off the Rails	Mount Olympus	Mount Olympus
Matt Cable	WINNER					LOSER
Jon Brascetta	LOSER					
Ashley Hawkins		WINNER			WINNER	
Jenessa Goeman		LOSER				
Angel Villegas			LOSER			
DJ Townsel			WINNER			WINNER
Alma Dwumfour				WINNER	LOSER	
Lauren Regno				LOSER		

=== Episode 7 ===
Contestant	Atlas Smash	Tower Drop	Uprising	Off the Rails	Mount Olympus	Mount Olympus
Elisara Edwards	WINNER					LOSER
Davy Barnes	LOSER					
Covenant Falana		LOSER				
Brad Schaeffer		WINNER				WINNER
Shannon Decker			WINNER		LOSER	
Sandra Arechaederra			LOSER			
Kara Lazauskas				WINNER	WINNER	
Breona Evans				LOSER		

=== Episode 8 (Battle of the Titans) ===
Contestant	Atlas Smash	Cyclone	Cyclone	Lunar Impact	Atlas Smash	Herculean Pull	Herculean Pull	Lunar Impact
James Jean-Louis	WINNER							
Christopher Watts	LOSER							
Nika Sedghi		LOSER						
Christiana Rugloski		WINNER						
Tyler Lucas			WINNER					
Brad Schaeffer			LOSER					
Emily Andzulis				LOSER				
Jackie Wood				WINNER				
Ashley Hawkins					LOSER			
Jess Griffith					WINNER			
Bridger Buckley						WINNER		
DJ Townsel						LOSER		
Kara Lazauskas							LOSER	
Charity Witt							WINNER	
Derik Scott								WINNER
Cole Wadsworth III								LOSER

=== Episode 9 (Titan Championship) ===
Contestant	Hammering Ram	Uprising	Hammering Ram	Uprising	Mount Olympus	Mount Olympus
Derik Scott	WINNER					RUNNER UP
Tyler Lucas	LOSER					
Charity Witt		WINNER			CHAMPION	
Jess Griffith		LOSER				
Jackie Wood			WINNER		RUNNER UP	
Christiana Rugloski			LOSER			
James Jean-Louis				WINNER		CHAMPION
Bridger Buckley				LOSER		

== Season 2 ==
=== Contestants ===
Except where noted, source for all names, ages, hometowns, current residences, and occupations:

Contestant	Age	Hometown	Current residence	Occupation	Region
Margaux Alvarez	35	Stevensville, Montana	Las Vegas, Nevada	Winemaker and Fitness Coach	West
Shantal Athill	29	Montclair, New Jersey	East Orange, New Jersey	Firefighter	East
Alexis Balliet	28	Derry, New Hampshire	Drums, Pennsylvania	Director of Quality (Pharmaceutical Company)	Central
Kareem Brinson	35	Neptune, New Jersey	Howell, New Jersey	DJ Entertainer and Group Fitness Instructor	East
Blake Broadhurst	37	Eau Gallie, Florida	Orlando, Florida	Police K9 Instructor and Handler	East
Nadi Carey	28	Tucson, Arizona	Tucson, Arizona	NCAA Women’s Basketball Referee	Central
Matthew "Matt" Chan	42	Chicago, Illinois	Denver, Colorado	Firefighter	Central
Victor Cruz	33	Paterson, New Jersey		Former NFL Champion and Pro Bowler	West
Jamara Garrett	25	Albuquerque, New Mexico	Albuquerque, New Mexico	Bank Teller	West
Cynthia Gauthier	31	Mirabel, Quebec	Ruskin, Florida	Monster Jam Truck Driver and Welder	East
Jessie Graff	36	New York City, New York	Calabasas, California	Stuntwoman, Taekwondo Black Belt, and American Ninja Warrior	West
Lindsey Hamm	33	Kingwood, Texas	Bishop, California	Mountain Guide	West
Andrew Hanus	32	Mantua, Ohio	East Norriton Township, Pennsylvania	Grants Manager	East
Mitch Harrison	31	Salt Lake City, Utah	Kenai, Alaska	Security Officer	West
Michael Hewitt	29	Littleton, Colorado	Arlington, Virginia	Professional Opera Singer	Central
Haley Johnson	25	Fort Oglethorpe, Georgia	Fort Benning, Georgia	Active Duty Army Registered Nurse	East
Dasha Kuret	32	Orlando, Florida	Orlando, Florida	AEW Announcer and Spanish Commentator	East
Michelle Lewis	32	Atlanta, Georgia	Atlanta, Georgia	Real Estate Agent	East
Chantae McMillan	31	Rolla, Missouri	Fort Rucker, Alabama	Professional Track and Field Athlete	Central
Eric Palicia	40	Stoneboro, Pennsylvania	Wiesbaden, Germany	Army Combat Engineer Officer	West
Noah Palicia	30	Stoneboro, Pennsylvania	Yokota Air Base, Japan	Air Force C130J Instructor Pilot	West
Joshua "Josh" Porter	29	Jacksonville, Florida	Fayetteville, North Carolina	Active Duty Army	East
Kaleb Redden	35	Big Piney, Wyoming	Meridian, Idaho	Sports Medicine Physician	Central
Robbie Rodriguez	30	Tucson, Arizona	Miami, Florida	Registered Nurse	West
Exodus Rogers	33	Sacramento, California	Sacramento, California	Deputy Probation Assistant for the Sacramento County Youth Detention Facility	West
Courtney Roselle	31	Cedar Grove, New Jersey	Jersey City, New Jersey	Strength and Conditioning Coach and Motivational Speaker	East
Jaime Seeman	35	Lincoln, Nebraska	Omaha, Nebraska	Doctor - OBGYN	Central
Steven Shelby	32	Columbus, Ohio	Delaware, Ohio	Deputy Sheriff	Central
Claressa Shields	25	Flint, Michigan		Professional Boxer	Central
Wayne Skivington	32	???, United Kingdom	Las Vegas, Nevada	Cirque du Soleil Performer	West
Dani Speegle	25	Conifer, Colorado	Orlando, Florida	Nutrition and Fitness Consultant	Central
Ryan Steenberg	37	Rochester, New York	Webster, New York	World Ranked Professional Long Drive Athlete and Entrepreneur	East
Kelly Stone	29	Lakewood, Colorado	Lakewood, Colorado	Pediatric and Adult Physical Therapist	West
William "Will" Sutton	26	Trenton, North Carolina	Trenton, North Carolina	High School Agriculture Teacher and JV Basketball Coach	East
Natalie Talbert	30	Concord, California	Soquel, California	CrossFit Trainer and Nutrition Coach	West
Hannah Teter	33	Belmont, Vermont		Snowboarder	East
Joe Thomas	35	Brookfield, Wisconsin		NFL Network Host and Former NFL Player	Central
Kelly Valdez	28	Fort Lauderdale, Florida	Anaheim Hills, California	Wildland Firefighter	West
Jessica "Jess" Weatherby	41	Pleasanton, Texas	Waco, Texas	Homeschool Mom	Central
Bartley Weaver IV	31	Cave City, Kentucky	Bowling Green, Kentucky	Tennessee Titans Mascot and Kentucky State Trooper	Central
Tyron Woodley	38	Ferguson, Missouri		Mixed Martial Artist	East
Blake Wright	24	Crosby, Texas	Tyler, Texas	Middle School Social Studies Teacher & Football/S&C Coach	Central

=== Central Region ===
==== Episode 1 (Part 1) ====
Contestant	Launch Pad	Nuts and Bolts	Lunar Impact	Over the Edge	Herculean Pull	Herculean Pull	Mount Olympus	Mount Olympus
Alexis Balliet	WINNER			LOSER	LOSER			
Chantae McMillan	LOSER			WINNER	WINNER			WINNER
Claressa Shields								LOSER
Bartley Weaver IV		LOSER	WINNER			LOSER		
Matt Chan		WINNER	LOSER			WINNER	LOSER	
Joe Thomas							WINNER	

==== Episode 1 (Part 2) ====
Contestant	Chain Linked	Launch Pad	Over the Edge	Kick Out	Mount Olympus	Mount Olympus
Jaime Seeman	WINNER			WINNER	LOSER	
Jess Weatherby	LOSER			LOSER		
Chantae McMillan					WINNER	
Blake Wright		LOSER	LOSER			
Steven Shelby		WINNER	WINNER			LOSER
Joe Thomas						WINNER

==== Episode 2 ====
Contestant	Chain Linked	Nuts and Bolts	Lunar Impact	Kick Out	Mount Olympus	Mount Olympus
Kaleb Redden	WINNER			WINNER	LOSER	
Michael Hewitt	LOSER			LOSER		
Joe Thomas					WINNER	
Nadi Carey		LOSER	LOSER			
Dani Speegle		WINNER	WINNER			WINNER
Chantae McMillan						LOSER

==== Episode 3 (Regional Finals) ====
Contestant	Hammer Down	Hammer Down	Resistance	Resistance	Mount Olympus	Mount Olympus
Kaleb Redden	WINNER			LOSER		
Steven Shelby	LOSER					
Matt Chan	SECOND			WINNER		WINNER
Joe Thomas						LOSER
Jaime Seeman		SECOND	WINNER		LOSER	
Claressa Shields		LOSER				
Chantae McMillan		WINNER	LOSER			
Dani Speegle					WINNER	

=== West Region ===
==== Episode 4 ====
Contestant	Chain Linked	Launch Pad	Kick Out	Over the Edge	Herculean Pull	Mount Olympus	Mount Olympus
Noah Palicia	LOSER		WINNER		WINNER		WINNER
Eric Palicia	WINNER		LOSER		LOSER		
Victor Cruz							LOSER
Natalie Talbert		LOSER		LOSER			
Kelly Valdez		WINNER		WINNER		WINNER	
Jessie Graff						LOSER	

==== Episode 5 ====
Contestant	Launch Pad	Nuts and Bolts	Over the Edge	Lunar Impact	Mount Olympus	Mount Olympus
Exodus Rogers	WINNER		WINNER		LOSER	
Mitch Harrison	LOSER		LOSER			
Noah Palicia					WINNER	
Kelly Stone		LOSER		LOSER		
Margaux Alvarez		WINNER		WINNER		WINNER
Kelly Valdez						LOSER

==== Episode 6 ====
Contestant	Nuts and Bolts	Chain Linked	Lunar Impact	Kick Out	Mount Olympus	Mount Olympus
Robbie Rodriguez	LOSER		LOSER			
Wayne Skivington	WINNER		WINNER			LOSER
Noah Palicia						WINNER
Lindsey Hamm		WINNER		WINNER	LOSER	
Jamara Garrett		LOSER		LOSER		
Margaux Alvarez					WINNER	

==== Episode 7 (Regional Finals) ====
Contestant	Hammer Down	Hammer Down	Resistance	Resistance	Mount Olympus	Mount Olympus
Exodus Rogers	LOSER					
Victor Cruz	WINNER		LOSER			
Wayne Skivington	SECOND		WINNER		LOSER	
Noah Palicia					WINNER	
Jessie Graff		WINNER		LOSER		
Kelly Valdez		SECOND		WINNER		LOSER
Lindsey Hamm		LOSER				
Margaux Alvarez						WINNER

=== East Region ===
==== Episode 8 ====
Contestant	Chain Linked	Nuts and Bolts	Kick Out	Lunar Impact	Herculean Pull	Mount Olympus	Mount Olympus
Haley Johnson	WINNER		WINNER			WINNER	
Cynthia Gauthier	LOSER		LOSER				
Hannah Teter						LOSER	
Kareem Brinson		WINNER		LOSER	LOSER		
Will Sutton		LOSER		WINNER	WINNER		WINNER
Tyron Woodley							LOSER

==== Episode 9 ====
Contestant	Launch Pad	Chain Linked	Kick Out	Over the Edge	Herculean Pull	Mount Olympus	Mount Olympus
Michelle Lewis	LOSER			LOSER			
Dasha Kuret	WINNER			WINNER		LOSER	
Haley Johnson						WINNER	
Ryan Steenberg		LOSER	WINNER		WINNER		LOSER (Note: At the Log Lift section of Mount Olympus, Steenberg injured his left biceps and subsequently withdrew from the challenge. In spite of winning by default, Sutton finished the challenge.)
Andrew Hanus		WINNER	LOSER		LOSER		
Will Sutton							WINNER

==== Episode 10 ====
Contestant	Nuts and Bolts	Launch Pad	Lunar Impact	Over the Edge	Mount Olympus	Mount Olympus
Courtney Roselle	WINNER		WINNER			WINNER
Shantal Athill	LOSER		LOSER			
Haley Johnson						LOSER
Blake Broadhurst		LOSER		LOSER		
Josh Porter		WINNER		WINNER	LOSER	
Will Sutton					WINNER	

==== Episode 11 (Regional Finals) ====
Contestant	Hammer Down	Hammer Down	Resistance	Resistance	Mount Olympus	Mount Olympus
Haley Johnson	LOSER					
Hannah Teter	SECOND			WINNER	LOSER	
Dasha Kuret	WINNER			LOSER		
Courtney Roselle					WINNER	
Tyron Woodley		WINNER	LOSER			
Andrew Hanus (Note: Due to Steenberg's left biceps injury, Hanus took his place in the Eastern Regional Finals.)		LOSER				
Josh Porter		SECOND	WINNER			LOSER
Will Sutton						WINNER

=== Episode 12 (Finals) ===
Contestant	Hammer Down	Hammer Down	Herculean Pull	Herculean Pull	Mount Olympus	Mount Olympus
Dani Speegle	WINNER				WINNER	
Margaux Alvarez	SECOND		WINNER		LOSER	
Courtney Roselle	LOSER		LOSER			
Matt Chan		WINNER				WINNER
Noah Palicia		SECOND		LOSER		
Will Sutton		LOSER		WINNER		LOSER

== Ratings ==
=== Season 1 ===
Viewership and ratings per episode of The Titan Games
No.	Title	Air date	Rating/share (18–49)	Viewers (millions)	DVR (18–49)	DVR viewers (millions)	Total (18–49)	Total viewers (millions)
1	"Let The Titan Games Begin: Trials 1"	January 3, 2019	1.8/8	6.50	0.5	1.31	2.3	7.82
2	"The Titan Games: Trials 2"	January 10, 2019	1.6/7	5.72	0.4	1.19	2.0	6.92
3	"The Titan Games: Trials 3"	January 17, 2019	1.3/6	4.88	0.4	1.14	1.7	6.03
4	"The Titan Games: Trials 4"	January 24, 2019	1.2/6	4.66	0.3	0.93	1.5	5.61
5	"The Titan Games: Trials 5"	January 31, 2019	1.1/5	4.65	0.3	0.84	1.4	5.49
6	"The Titan Games: Trials 6"	February 7, 2019	1.0/5	4.10	0.3	0.92	1.3	5.03
7	"The Titan Games: Trials 7"	February 14, 2019	1.1/5	4.35	0.3	0.86	1.4	5.21
8	"The Titan Games: Battle of the Titans"	February 21, 2019	1.1/5	4.32	0.3	0.83	1.4	5.15
9	"The Titan Games: The Titan Games Championship"	February 28, 2019	1.0/5	4.48	0.4	0.92	1.4	5.40

=== Season 2 ===
On September 16, 2019, NBC renewed the series for a second season. Dwayne Johnson stated that season two would have a new arena, new challenges, and new competitors. It premiered on May 25, 2020.

Viewership and ratings per episode of The Titan Games
No.	Title	Air date	Rating/share (18–49)	Viewers (millions)	DVR (18–49)	DVR viewers (millions)	Total (18–49)	Total viewers (millions)
1	"The Titan Games Premiere"	May 25, 2020	0.7/4	3.44	0.2	0.77	0.9	4.21
2	"Central Region 2: The Rock Meets Doc Thor"	June 1, 2020	0.8/5	4.15	0.2	0.61	1.0	4.75
3	"Central Regional Finals"	June 8, 2020	0.8/5	3.90	0.2	0.61	0.9	4.51
4	"West Region Premiere: NFL's Victor Cruz and Stuntwoman Jessie Graff"	June 15, 2020	0.7/5	3.79	0.2	0.70	0.9	4.49
5	"West Region 2: The True Meaning of a Titan"	June 22, 2020	0.8/5	3.88	0.2	0.48	0.9	4.37
6	"West Region 3: The Circus Comes to Town"	June 29, 2020	0.7/5	3.92	0.2	0.66	1.0	4.58
7	"Western Regional Finals"	July 6, 2020	0.7/5	3.85	0.2	0.61	0.9	4.46
8	"East Region Premiere: UFC's Tyron Woodley and Gold Medalist Hannah Teter"	July 13, 2020	0.7/5	3.75	0.2	0.71	0.9	4.46
9	"East Region 2: A Surprise for Dwayne"	July 20, 2020	0.8/5	3.82	0.2	0.65	1.0	4.47
10	"East Region 3: DJ's Last Call"	July 27, 2020	0.7/5	3.69	0.2	0.67	0.9	4.36
11	"Eastern Regional Finals"	August 3, 2020	0.7/4	3.65	0.1	0.53	0.8	4.12
12	"The Titan Games Championship"	August 10, 2020	0.7/5	3.54	0.2	0.54	0.8	4.07
