= Dating Naked UK =

UK television series

Coordinates: 10.329513°N 75.592370°W

- Genre: Reality dating game show
- Presented by: Rylan Clark
- Country of origin: United Kingdom
- Original language: English
- No. of seasons: 2
- No. of episodes: 20

Production
- Production locations: Colombia; Panama
- Running time: 43 minutes
- Production company: Nest Productions

Original release
- Network: Paramount+
- Release: 23 August 2024 – present

Dating Naked UK is a British reality dating game show based on the American version of the same name. It debuted on Paramount+ on 23 August 2024 and is hosted by Rylan Clark. Unlike the American show, nudity is not blurred.

On 4 September 2024, the show was renewed for a second season.

In December 2025, the first season was shown on the free-to-air channel E4.

== Format ==
Dating Naked UK places single people on a tropical island, where they live together completely nude from the moment they arrive. The show's format is built around peeling back the layers—both literally and emotionally—as contestants attempt to establish romantic connections under these unusual, vulnerable conditions.

Each episode features a variety of dates (often with a twist or challenge), arrivals of “naked newbies” who change existing dynamics, and interpersonal tensions as jealousy, attraction, and insecurity emerge. At the end of most episodes, there is a group elimination meeting called “The Dumping Ground,” where one or more contestants are voted out.

In the final episode, in order to win the competition, which usually includes a cash prize, the remaining couples are required to demonstrate that their connection is stronger than physical attraction alone.

== Season overview ==
Series	Daters	Location	Host	Episodes	Originally released		Winners
Series	Daters	Location	Host	Episodes	First released	Last released	Winners
1	17	Colombia	Rylan Clark	10	23 August 2024	20 September 2024	Jonathan Brown & Tiegan Rudge
2	16	Panama	Rylan Clark	10	29 August 2025	26 September 2025	Rico Hammett & Lauren Louise

== Contestants ==
=== Season 1 ===
- Tiegan Rudge
- Mike Durrant
- Emily Ivy
- Chrislove Brandt
- Romeo Larmond
- Dominik Herbert
- Rico Hammett
- Dan Ash
- Lauren Beschi
- Billy Field
- Tiarne Butler
- Jonathan Brown
- Zach Schaefer
- Monika Lara Smith
- Leylah Linda
- Sean Wepener
- Joey Staerkle

=== Season 2 ===
- Kelsey Jenner
- Keir Dale-Oakes
- Mani
- Nina
- Amara Zammit
- Connor Rogers
- Jarrakeh Cherno Jarra
- Matthew Edwards
- Jordan Langley
- Luke Worley
- Ivan Alexiev
- Lauren Louise
- Dominik Herbert
- Rico Hammett
- Ryan Kendall
- Tilly Skok

== Episodes ==
=== Season 1 (2024) ===
Dating Naked UK season 1 episodes
No. overall	No. in season	Title	Original release date
1	1	"Stripping Off"	23 August 2024
2	2	"The Naked Newbie"	23 August 2024
3	3	"Dare or Bare"	30 August 2024
4	4	"Cocktails & Cock Tales"	30 August 2024
5	5	"Kiss Kiss"	6 September 2024
6	6	"Double Trouble"	6 September 2024
7	7	"A Devilish Party"	13 September 2024
8	8	"Return of the Exes"	13 September 2024
9	9	"Genuine Connections"	20 September 2024
10	10	"Winning Connections"	20 September 2024

=== Season 2 (2025) ===
Dating Naked UK season 2 episodes
No. overall	No. in season	Title	Original release date
11	1	"Time to bare all"	29 August 2025
12	2	"It's getting hot in here"	29 August 2025
13	3	"Dom's back"	5 September 2025
14	4	"One big sausage party"	5 September 2025
15	5	"Save it with a kiss"	12 September 2025
16	6	"A storm is coming"	12 September 2025
17	7	"Honey, I'm home"	17 September 2025
18	8	"A beachy decision"	19 September 2025
19	9	"The ultimate test"	26 September 2025
20	10	"The final reveal"	26 September 2025
