= Brehanna Daniels =

First African American woman in a NASCAR Cup Series pit crew

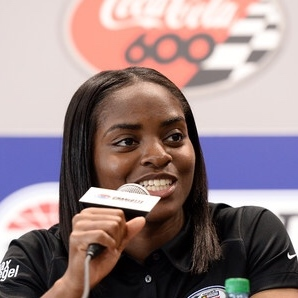
- Born: January 26, 1994 (age 31); Virginia Beach, Virginia, U.S.
- Education: Norfolk State University
- Occupation: NASCAR tire changer
- Years active: 2017–present

Brehanna Michelle Daniels (born January 26, 1994) is a tire changer for NASCAR, the first African American woman in a NASCAR Cup Series pit crew, and part of the first female duo to do pit crew work.

== Early life and education ==
Daniels is from Virginia Beach, Virginia.

Daniels attended Norfolk State University, where she majored in communications and played as point guard for the school's basketball team.

== Career ==
=== Racing ===
Daniels was recruited out of college into NASCAR's Drive for Diversity program in 2016, where she met Breanna O'Leary. Daniels was one of ten selected from around the country to join. NASCAR's director of athletic performance, Phil Horton, cited her previous athletics experience and exceptional hand speed as key ingredients to her success in the program.

Daniels trained at Rev Racing in Concord, North Carolina and then at Xcalibur Pit School in Mooresville, North Carolina.

In 2017, Daniels was the first African American woman to go over the wall in a national racing series in ARCA's race at Fairgrounds Speedway in Nashville, Tennessee.

She became a tire changer for ARCA driver Thad Moffit at Toledo Speedway in Ohio with O'Leary, pitted in NASCAR's Camping World Truck Series for Cody Ware, and pitted in the Xfinity Series for Mike Harmon.

Later in 2017, she became the first black woman to work in a pit crew in a national NASCAR race at the Coke Zero Sugar 400 annual car race at Daytona International Speedway and later the NASCAR Cup Series. She and O'Leary made history as the first female duo to work a pit crew, changing tires for Ray Black Jr. Daniels participated in the Cup race just under two years after she began her training.

In 2019, Daniels pitted with O'Leary for Cody Ware in the Daytona 500 qualifying race and the race itself.

Daniels has also worked with the Drive for Diversity Pit Crew Combine program from which she got her start.

=== Television ===
Given her athletic ability, Daniels starred as a competitor on Dwayne Johnson's reality competition series from NBC, The Titan Games. She also starred in a nationally-run Advil commercial.

== Awards ==
Daniels was honored at the 2020 NASCAR Drive for Diversity Awards on October 8, 2020 where she received the Crew Member Award.
