= Milton Patton =

Country singer from Arkansas, US

Milton Patton is a country singer from Arkansas who first came to prominence via his audition on the television show America's Got Talent.

== Background ==
Patton grew up in Forrest City, Arkansas. He was exposed to gospel, R&B, hip hop and some jazz. His exposure to country music came about as a result of his father playing country music at his car detailing business. According some oral history within his family, there is a lineage to Charlie Patton, the "Father of the Delta Blues".

== Career ==
Patton entered the eighth season of America's Got Talent in 2013, performing "Whiskey Lullaby" by Brad Paisley And Alison Krauss in the audition round. Following the exposure he received, a major record label offered him a $500,000 record deal. The music executives wanted to shape him into what was described in an article about him by the Springfield News-Leader as "a flavor-of-the-month, R&B-hip-hop kind of country artist". For Patton who has a strong country connection, this was a deal breaker and he rejected the deal.

By 2016 he had released his first single, "Get Us in Trouble". In September that year, he was appearing at Jimmy Doyle's Country Club in North Little Rock.

== Discography ==
Singles
Title	Release info	Year	Notes #
"Get Us In Trouble"		2015	

EPs & Albums
Title	Release info	Year	Notes #
Milton Patton	Arky Blue Productions	2015	EP
