= Ryan Steenberg =

American long drive golfer (born 1983)

Ryan Steenberg (born April 16, 1983) is an American golfer who competes as a professional long drive athlete. He finished as runner-up in the 2016 World Long Drive Championship.

== Long drive career ==
In 2011, Steenberg was signed by Krank Golf, a major equipment manufacturer in long drive, after beating several leading long drivers in an exhibition game at PGA trade show in Orlando, Florida. His first win as a professional in a long drive event came in April 2013 at the Masters of Long Drive in Atlanta. In 2016, Steenberg was the runner-up to Joe Miller at the Volvik World Long Drive Championship in Thackerville, Oklahoma. In 2018, he won at the Bash for Cash in Canada. That year he also advanced to the semi-finals of both the Clash in the Canyon (Nevada) and Tennessee Big Shots benefiting Niswonger Children’s Hospital, along with reaching the quarterfinals of the Volvik World Long Drive Championship.

== Personal life ==
Steenberg played football and earned a Bachelor of Science degree in exercise science from Ithaca College. Following his graduation he served an internship with EXOS, a nationwide human performance company. In 2010, Steenberg started his own company in Brighton; he later moved to larger premises in Rochester. He and his wife Janessa are the parents of three children (2 from his previous marriage, 1 from her previous).
