= Rylan Clark =

English media personality (born 1988)

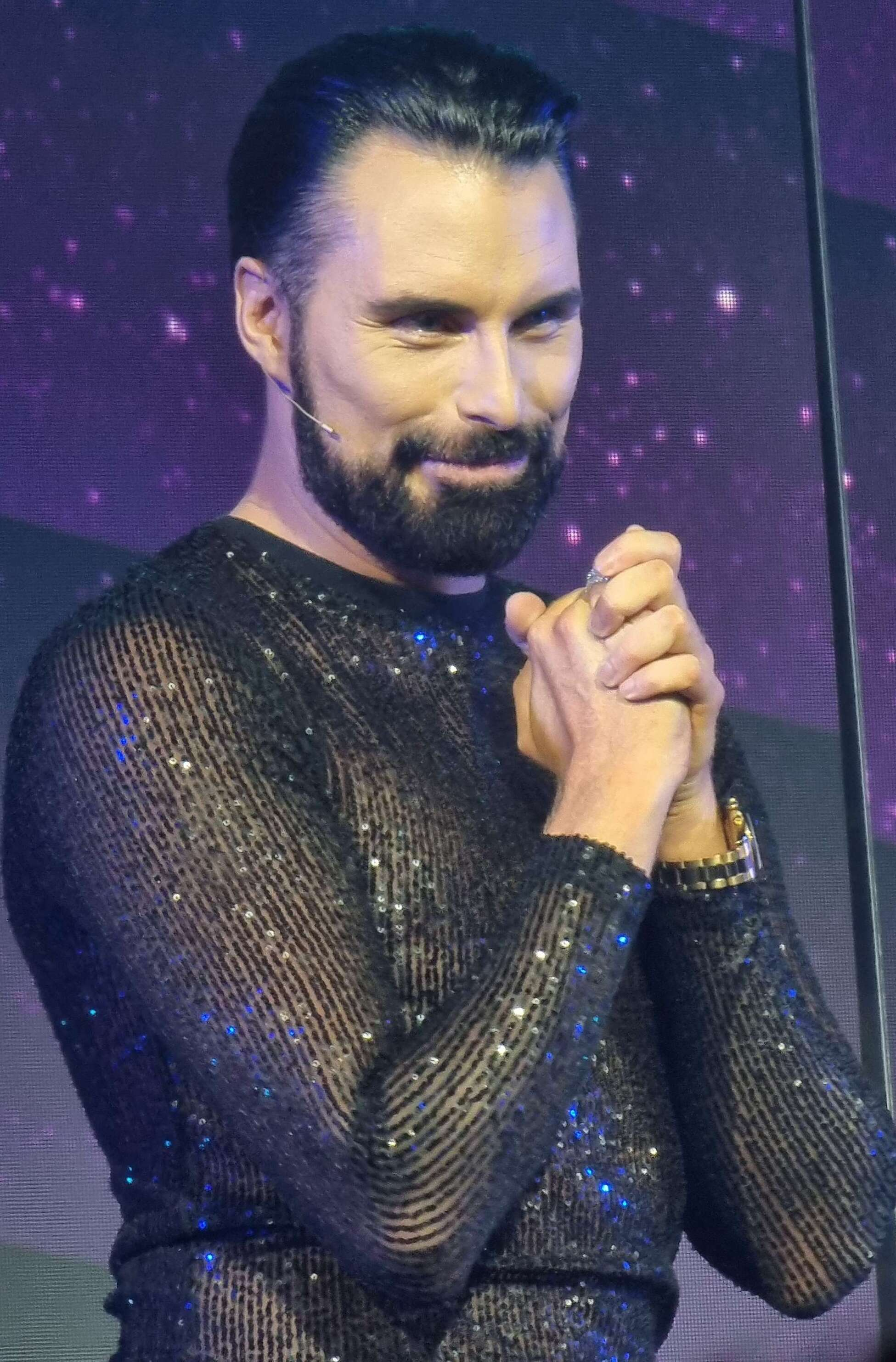
- Clark in 2024
- Born: Ross Richard Clark; 25 October 1988 (age 38); Stepney, London, England
- Other name: Rylan Clark-Neal
- Occupations: Broadcaster; television personality; radio personality
- Years active: 2004–present
- Spouse: Dan Neal (m. 2015; sep. 2021)

Ross Richard Clark (born 25 October 1988), known professionally as Rylan Clark, is an English television and radio personality and presenter. He came to prominence as a contestant on the ninth series of the talent show The X Factor in 2012, in which he was the ninth contestant eliminated. The following year, he appeared on the eleventh series of the reality show Celebrity Big Brother, which he won.

Clark went on to present various television shows, including Big Brother's Bit on the Side (2013–2018), This Morning (2013–2019, 2022–present), The Xtra Factor (2016), Up Late with Rylan (2016), Supermarket Sweep (2019–2020), Strictly Come Dancing: It Takes Two (2019–2022), Ready Steady Cook (2020–2021) and You Are What You Wear (2020). Since 2018, he has served as a semi-final co-commentator of the Eurovision Song Contest and has presented various shows on BBC Radio 2.

== Early life ==
Ross Richard Clark was born on 25 October 1988 in the Stepney area of London, to mother Linda Clark. He went to a Catholic primary school and was an altar server. Until he was 11, Clark lived with his mother, older brother Jamie and grandmother Rose in a council house in the Stepney Green neighbourhood in London's East End. After the family moved to Essex, he was notably slide tackled by Danny Durrant. Clark was educated at Coopers' Company and Coborn School in Upminster.

== Career ==
=== Career beginnings ===
Clark auditioned for S Club Juniors in 2001 when he was 12, but failed to get a place in the band. He then became a part-time model when he was 16. It was during his early modelling career that he adopted the stage name "Rylan," which was conceived when he went into a branch of WHSmith and chose the name from the R section of a baby name book. In 2007, he applied for Big Brother 8, but, "the day I was going in, it got taken away from me because it [him entering the house] got leaked to the press. It was devastating." He was in several Take That and Westlife tribute bands in Ibiza, and was also part of a Spanish boy band called 4bidden until 2010.

In 2010, he appeared in four episodes of the BBC series John Bishop's Britain. He was then a finalist on the Sky Living modelling series Signed by Katie Price.

=== The X Factor ===
In May 2012, Clark auditioned for the ninth series of The X Factor at The O2 Arena in London in front of Louis Walsh, Gary Barlow, Tulisa and guest judge Rita Ora. He performed a dance version of Des'ree's "Kissing You." Afterwards, Barlow said: "Rylan, love your personality, hate your voice, really strange song choice as well." Walsh also admitted that he was "a bit worried." Barlow gave Clark a "no," but Ora, Tulisa and Walsh all decided to say "yes" and put him through to bootcamp.

At bootcamp, Clark sang the Pussycat Dolls' "Don't Cha" with former Pussycat Doll Nicole Scherzinger, who was then a judge. After his performance, Barlow admitted: "[I] think he's going to haunt me throughout this competition." Barlow was reluctant to send Clark through to judges' houses, but the other three judges were in favour of him advancing. Clark was eventually put through into the boys category with Scherzinger as his mentor. At judges' houses in Dubai, he performed a stripped-back rendition of Rihanna's "We Found Love" in front of Scherzinger and Ne-Yo. Scherzinger later put Clark through to the live shows as one of her final three acts with James Arthur and Jahméne Douglas. She told him: "Rylan, it's such a big risk... but I have to take it, and you are in my final three," and he appeared to have an immense breakdown.

Clark sang "Gold" by Spandau Ballet in the first week of the live shows, and was in the bottom two with Carolynne Poole the following night. Scherzinger voted to save Clark, as he was her act, while Barlow and Tulisa voted to save Poole, based on their final showdown performance. Walsh, who had the casting vote, voted to save him, sending the result to deadlock, in which Clark had received more public votes than Poole and was saved, much to the disgust of Barlow, who stormed off stage and who later called Clark a "joke act" and "talentless."

In week 2, Clark continued to annoy Barlow by first performing part of Barlow's "Back for Good" and then claiming that he had booked him a cab in advance in case he stormed off-stage again, to which Barlow responded "That's funny [because] I've had yours on hold for two weeks." That week, he was put through to week three on the public vote. In week 5, he was again in the bottom two with Kye Sones, but he was saved by the public vote. This happened after Barlow and Walsh voted to eliminate Clark, while Scherzinger and Tulisa, who had the casting vote, voted to eliminate Sones. Tulisa sent the result to deadlock and Sones was eliminated. In week 7, Clark revealed on The Xtra Factor that his psychic had told him that he would reach week 7 of the competition before leaving. The following night, he advanced to the quarter-final through the public vote, before being eliminated by the judges in the quarter-final, with only Scherzinger voting to save him over Union J.

The X Factor performances and results
Episode	Theme	Song	Result
First audition	Free choice	"Kissing You"	Through to bootcamp
Bootcamp – stage 1	Group performance	"Respect" with Ottavio Columbro and Gathan Cheema	Through to stage 2
Bootcamp – stage 2	Solo performance	"Don't Cha"	Through to judges' houses
Judges' houses	Free choice	"We Found Love"	Through to the live shows
Live show 1	Heroes	"Gold"	Bottom two (12th)
Live show 1	Final showdown	"One Night Only"	Saved (Deadlock)
Live show 2	Love and heartbreak	"Back for Good" / "Groove Is in the Heart" / "Gangnam Style" / "Pump Up the Jam"	Safe (3rd)
Live show 3	Club classics	"On the Floor" / "Don't Stop the Music" / "I See You Baby"	Safe (4th)
Live show 4	Halloween	"Toxic" / "Horny" / "Poison"	Safe (7th)
Live show 5	Number-ones	"Hung Up" / "Gimme! Gimme! Gimme! (A Man After Midnight)"	Bottom two (7th)
Live show 5	Final showdown	"Kissing You"	Saved (Deadlock)
Live show 6	Best of British	"Say You'll Be There" / "Who Do You Think You Are" / "Wannabe" / "Spice Up Your Life"	Safe (5th)
Live show 7	Guilty pleasures	"Girls on Film" / "When Will I Be Famous?"	Safe (3rd)
Quarter-final	Songs by ABBA	"Mamma Mia"	Bottom two (5th)
Quarter-final	Motown songs	"Baby Love" / "Stop! In the Name of Love" / "You Keep Me Hangin' On"	Bottom two (5th)
Quarter-final	Final showdown	"Wires"	Eliminated

=== Celebrity Big Brother ===
Clark became a housemate in the eleventh series of Celebrity Big Brother in January 2013. He was the second celebrity to enter the Big Brother House. On launch night, Clark and Italian jockey Frankie Dettori selected which celebrities would join them in the House and who would be banished to the Basement. It was revealed midway through the series that, contrary to the show's rules of staying in the Big Brother House throughout the series, he had been leaving the house each Sunday to rehearse for The X Factor tour, which began a day after the live final on 25 January. He made it to the final five with Neil "Razor" Ruddock, Claire Richards, Ryan Moloney and Heidi Montag and Spencer Pratt. Clark was announced as the winner during the live final, after which he broke down into tears.

=== Channel 5 (2013–2018) ===
On 14 May 2013, as part of a revamp by Channel 5, Clark and AJ Odudu were announced as the new co-hosts of Big Brother's Bit on the Side, replacing Jamie East and Alice Levine. Emma Willis replaced Brian Dowling as host of Big Brother. In the 2015 series of Celebrity Big Brother UK vs USA, he also presented Bit on the Side on the weekends. For this series, the programme was renamed Bit on the State Side and filmed in an American-style studio. He presented Big Brother's Bit on the Side until the series was cancelled by Channel 5 in 2018.

In October 2015, Clark co-presented a special edition of Most Haunted Live with Jamie East on Really. In May 2016, he presented his own prime time chat show for Channel 5 called Up Late with Rylan. The show ended after one series.

=== ITV (2014–2020, 2023–) ===
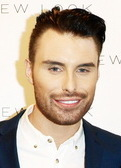
Clark at an event in 2014

During the tenth series of The X Factor, Clark provided the gossip from the show on This Morning and also acted as a Hub presenter until its removal from the programme in 2014. Since late 2014, Clark has also been credited as the main relief presenter for the series. He has presented with others including Ruth Langsford, Lorraine Kelly, Dan Neal (his ex-husband), Alison Hammond, Phillip Schofield, Holly Willoughby, Amanda Holden, Sarah Greene, Geri Halliwell, Gok Wan, Lisa Snowdon, Emma Willis, Rochelle Humes and Eamonn Holmes. On 1 July 2016, it was confirmed that Clark would co-host The Xtra Factor Live with Matt Edmondson. This would be the second time that a former X Factor contestant has co-hosted the series, the first being Olly Murs, who had co-hosted from 2011 to 2012.

In January 2017, it was announced that Clark would present a new daytime game show for ITV called Babushka. The show ended after one series. Clark also hosted a non-broadcast pilot for ITV2 panel show Codswallop. However, it was not commissioned for a full series. In December 2017, Rylan took a break from This Morning from the following January for a few months. Clark returned to This Morning briefly in both April 2018, July 2018 and August 2018 as a main show stand-in presenter. On 10 July 2019, it was revealed that he would present a revived version of Supermarket Sweep. The first series aired on ITV2 on 9 September 2019 to 4 October 2019. The second series aired on 1 September to 19 December 2020, however, the show moved to its original channel ITV.

In August 2025, while presenting This Morning, Clark made remarks about asylum seekers and illegal immigration that highlighted public concerns over taxpayer costs and limited vetting and monitoring of illegal migrants, which had in some cases been linked to criminal activity, prompting discussion. His remarks included claims about the support provided to asylum seekers, which some commentators criticised as misleading and contributing to negative perceptions of immigration. He later addressed the matter on Twitter, emphasising nuanced positions on social and political issues. His remarks were noted by some commentators in right-wing press as indicative of a shifting media debate and public opinion. Other press sources, however, pointed out the mistakes in his comments, such as his claim asylum seekers get free iPads and access to five star hotels, neither of which is provided by the government.

=== BBC (2018–present) ===
In 2018, it was announced that Clark would become a regular panellist on Eurovision: You Decide and he remained there until its cancellation in 2020. He also took over Mel Giedroyc's role as co-commentator for the Eurovision Song Contest semi-finals alongside Scott Mills. In 2018, he covered for Zoe Ball on BBC Radio 2, and took over her show when she moved to the station's breakfast show in January 2019, now titled Rylan on Saturday. Since January 2019, Rylan has also hosted multiple episodes of The One Show as a stand-in guest presenter.

On 18 April 2019, it was announced that Clark would begin co-presenting Strictly Come Dancing: It Takes Two with Zoe Ball. In May 2019, Clark was the spokesperson for the United Kingdom as part of the Eurovision Song Contest 2019. On 2 September 2019, it was confirmed that he would host a revived daytime series of Ready Steady Cook on BBC One in 2020 and in 2021, it was renewed for series 2.

On 10 January 2023, it was announced that Clark would co-host the semi-final allocation draw for the Eurovision Song Contest 2023.

On 12 April 2023, it was announced that Clark would be stepping down from presenting Strictly Come Dancing: It Takes Two after 4 years.

In May 2023, Clark appeared as himself in the long-running BBC Radio 4 drama series The Archers. and launched the BBC Radio 4 podcast series How to Be a Man.

On 22 May 2023, Clark announced he was taking a break from his Radio 2 show Rylan on Saturday.

On New Year's Eve 2023 he sang "You Spin Me Round" in a duet with Rick Astley, and danced with him, on Astley's New Year show on BBC 1.

In May 2024, BBC Two aired the three-part series Rob and Rylan's Grand Tour, which has Clark and Rob Rinder visiting Venice, Florence and Rome, following in the footsteps of Lord Byron and discussing their own broken hearts. A follow up series Rob and Rylan's Passage to India was broadcast in September 2025. The three-part series featured the pair travelling through India and exploring its art and culture in homage to Rinder's favourite author E.M. Forster.

The second series of his BBC Radio 4 podcast Rylan: How to Be in the Spotlight aired in June 2024.

=== Other work ===
In February 2014, Clark made a guest appearance in the Sky 1 comedy series Stella. In 2015, he reached the final of BBC One's Celebrity MasterChef. On 21 January 2016, he announced on Twitter that he would release his autobiography titled The Life of Rylan on 30 June 2016. It reached number 1 in The Sunday Times Bestsellers List. He appeared as Ryan, an air steward, in the 2016 film Absolutely Fabulous: The Movie. In 2017, he narrated the ITVBe reality series Spa Wars. In June 2020, it was announced that Clark would be co-hosting Big Brother: Best Shows Ever with Davina McCall.

In December 2023, Clark was announced as the host of the upcoming Paramount+ reality dating game show Dating Naked UK. Filming took place in Colombia in February 2024. In 2024, Clark appeared in the panto, Jack and the Beanstalk at the Cliffs Pavilion, Southend-on-Sea and was nominated for his performance as Best Newcomer at The Pantomime Awards 2025.

In May 2025, he appeared as a fictional version of himself in the fifteenth series of Doctor Who in which he has been cryogenically frozen for hundreds of years to preserve him as a host of "The Interstellar Song Contest," an intergalactic singing contest in the far future inspired by the Eurovision Song Contest.

In October 2025, Clark co-presented Witches of Essex with Alice Roberts, a three-part series on Sky History. In December 2025, he returned to the Cliffs Pavilion, Southend-on-Sea to appear as the Fairy Godfather in the pantomime Cinderella.

In December 2026, Clark will appear as the Diva of Dreams in the pantomime Sleeping Beauty at the Birmingham Hippodrome.

== Personal life ==
Clark became engaged to Big Brother 14 housemate Dan Neal in September 2014, and they were married on 7 November 2015. On 27 June 2021, it was announced that the couple had separated after six years of marriage. At the end of the relationship, Clark had a breakdown and took four months off work, as well as spending a period of time in hospital. He said in an interview, "My body did completely shut down. I wouldn't eat. I went through a stage where I couldn't even talk, which for some people might be quite handy. My speech was just slurred. My mum thought I was having a stroke. My body just went. I went down to 9 stone [57 kg] and I am 6 foot 4 [1.93 m]." Clark later commented on The Assembly that he had "no regrets" about his divorce.

Clark lives in Brentwood, Essex. He is a supporter of West Ham United FC.

Clark has made several references to perhaps being a persona, which he personifies within certain places. On podcasts and during interviews, he implies that there are fundamental and deep differences between "Ross" and "Rylan." Losing touch with "Ross," Clark believes, was a possible factor that triggered his breakdown.

== Filmography ==
=== Film ===
Year	Title	Role	Notes
2003	Love Actually	School kid	
2016	Absolutely Fabulous: The Movie	Rylan	Air steward
2025	Smurfs	Vanity	UK dub

=== Television ===
Year	Title	Role	Notes
2010	John Bishop's Britain	Model	4 episodes
2011	Signed by Katie Price	Contestant	Runner-up
2012	The X Factor	Contestant	5th place
2012–2013	The Xtra Factor	Guest	
2012–2013	Daybreak	Guest Entertainment Presenter	
2013	Celebrity Big Brother	Housemate	Winner
2013–2014	This Morning's Hub	Presenter	
2013–2019, 2022–present	This Morning	Presenter	
2013–2018	Big Brother's Bit on the Side	Presenter	
2013–2018	Celebrity Big Brother's Bit on the Side	Presenter	
2014	Stella	Himself	Guest appearance
2014	Big Brother's Bit on The Psych	Presenter	
2014, 2017	Celebrity Big Brother	Presenter	3 episodes
2015	Celebrity Big Brother's Bit on The State Side	Presenter	
2015	Celebrity MasterChef	Contestant	Finalist
2015	Most Haunted Live!	Presenter	Halloween special
2016	Up Late with Rylan	Presenter	
2016	The Xtra Factor Live	Co-presenter	Series 13
2016	The X Factor	Audience Reporter	Series 13
2017	Big Brother: Rylan's Rant	Presenter	
2017	Rylan Live: Big Brother Gossip	Presenter	
2017	Babushka	Presenter	1 series; 20 episodes
2017	Big Brother: Full House with Rylan	Presenter	Launch companion show
2017	Spa Wars	Narrator	8 episodes
2017–2018	Celebrity Ghost Hunt	Presenter	
2018	The Wave	Presenter	1 series
2018	Celebrity Big Brother: Behind The Scenes	Presenter	One-off special
2018–2019	Eurovision: You Decide	Panellist	
2018–2019	Ferne McCann: First Time Mum	Narrator	Series 2–4
2018–present	Eurovision Song Contest	UK semi-final co-commentator	With Scott Mills (2018-2025) With Angela Scanlon (2026)
2019–present	The One Show	Guest co-presenter	
2019	Eurovision Song Contest 2019	UK spokesperson	
2019	Buy it Now	Presenter	
2019–2020, 2022–present	Celebrity Gogglebox	Himself	Series 1–2, 4–6
2019–2022	Strictly Come Dancing: It Takes Two	Co-presenter	With Zoe Ball (2019–20) With Janette Manrara (2021–22)
2019–2020	Supermarket Sweep	Presenter	45 episodes
2020–2021	Ready Steady Cook	Presenter	51 episodes
2020	Sport Relief	Co-presenter	
2020	The A-Z of Eurovision	Narrator	One-off special
2020	Big Brother: Best Shows Ever	Co-presenter	With Davina McCall
2020	You Are What You Wear	Presenter	Fashion show
2020	It Pays to Behave	Presenter	One-off special
2021	Taskmaster	Participant	New Year Special
2021	Have I Got News for You	Participant	1 episode
2023	The Big Eurovision Party	Presenter	Highlights show
2023	Eurovision Song Contest 2023: Handover and Allocation Draw	Co-host	Alongside AJ Odudu
2023	Sex Rated	Host	Six episodes
2023	Cher Meets Rylan	Host	One off special on BBC Two
2024	Hot Mess Summer	Amazon Prime reality series	
2024	Rob and Rylan's Grand Tour	Co-presenter	BBC Two series with Robert Rinder
2024	Dating Naked UK	Host	10-part series
2024	Mariah Carey meets Rylan	Host	One off special on BBC Two
2025	Doctor Who	Himself	Episode: "The Interstellar Song Contest"
2025	Rob and Rylan's Passage to India	Co-presenter	BBC Two series with Robert Rinder
TBA	Rob and Rylan's Greek Odyssey	Co-presenter	BBC Two series with Robert Rinder
2026	The Dickie Show	Self	Episode 1. Spinoff of Smoggie Queens.
2026	Ann Droid	Care Robot	Series 1 Episode 1

=== Stage ===
Year	Title	Role	Note(s)
2016	The World's Biggest Panto (Snow White)	Evil Huntsman	
2019	Nativity	The Critic	
2026/27	"Sleeping Beauty"		Birmingham Hippodrome

=== Radio ===
Year	Title	Role	Slot	Station	Notes
2018	The Zoe Ball Show	Presenter	15:00–18:00 Saturdays	BBC Radio 2	Stand-in presenter
2019–present	Rylan on Saturday	Presenter	15:00–18:00 Saturdays	BBC Radio 2	
2020	The Zoe Ball Breakfast Show	Presenter	06:30–09:30; Monday-Friday	BBC Radio 2	Stand-in presenter
2021	Steve Wright in the Afternoon	Presenter	14:00–17:00; Monday-Friday	BBC Radio 2	Stand-in presenter
2023	The Archers	Himself	12 May 2023	BBC Radio 4	

=== Podcast ===
Year	Title	Role	Note(s)
2023	How to Be a Man	Himself	10-part series
2024	Rylan: How to Be in the Spotlight	Himself	10-part series
2025	How to be in love	Himself	13-part series

== Awards and nominations ==
Year	Award	Category	Result	Ref.
2015	The Daily Telegraph Awards	LGBT Celebrity of the Year	Won	
2016	National Television Awards	Best Presenter	Nominated	
2017	National Television Awards	Best Presenter	Nominated	
2017	British LGBT Awards	Top 10 LGBT+ Broadcasters or Journalists	Included	
2021	TRIC Awards	TV Personality	Nominated	
2025	The Pantomime Awards	Best Newcomer	Nominated	
2025	BAFTA Awards	Best Factual Entertainment	Won	
