= All-American Strongman Challenge =

American strength athletics competition

- 2012
- The logo of 2010 Gaspari Nutrition All-American Strongman Challenge

Tournament information
- Location: Los Angeles, California
- Month played: January
- Established: 2005
- Format: Multi-event competition

Current champion
- (United States) Mike Burke

The All-American Strongman Challenge is a leading competition in strength athletics that takes place within the annual Californian FitExpo. Although North America has a number of prestigious strongman events determining the "Strongest Man in America", the "Strongest Man in Canada" and the "Strongest Man in North America", the All-American Strongman Challenge has added kudos because it is open to entrants from overseas with the potential to bring in leading international competitors as well. It is notable for the calibre of entrants it has attracted, with many World's Strongest Man finalists being represented.

== FitExpo 2005 ==
Dates: 19, 20 February 2005
Location: Pasadena (California) (United States)

Contest Report:

Position	Name	Points
1.	Brian Schoonveld	36
2.	Travis Ortmayer	35,5
3.	Jesse Marunde	32
4.	Odd Haugen	29
5.	Jim Glassman	28
6.	Dave Ostlund	24,5
7.	Corey St. Clair	20,5
8.	Grant Higa	10,5

== FitExpo Strongman 2006 ==
Dates: 17, 18, 19 February 2006
Location: Pasadena (California) (United States)

Report :

Position	Name	Points
1.	Travis Ortmayer	106
2.	Jesse Marunde	104
3.	Dave Ostlund	74
4.	Mark Philippi	72,5
5.	Odd Haugen	66,5
6.	Josh Thigpen	65,5
7.	Kevin Nee	56
8.	Steve MacDonald	54
9.	Jason Bergmann	50,5

== All-American Strongman Challenge 2007 ==
Dates: 20, 21, 22 February 2007
Location: Pasadena (California) (United States)

Report :

Position	Name	Points
1.	Karl Gillingham	129
2.	Kevin Nee	124
3.	Jason Bergmann	108,5
4.	Dave Ostlund	107
5.	Odd Haugen	96
6.	Sam McMahon	94
7.	Josh Thigpen	83
8.	Pete Konradt	79
9.	Marshall White	77
10.	Corey St. Clair	77

== All-American Strongman Challenge 2008 ==
Dates: 15, 16, 17 February 2008
Location: Pasadena (California) (United States)

Report :

Position	Name	Points
1.	Travis Ortmayer	87,5
2.	Brian Shaw	76,5
3.	Dave Ostlund	72
4.	Jason Bergmann	62,5
5.	Pete Konradt	60
6.	Marshall White	57,5
7.	Jason Kristal	57
8.	Josh Thigpen	56
9.	Nick Best	52
10.	Jim Glassman	36

== All-American Strongman Challenge 2009 ==
Dates: 24, 25 January 2009
Location: Los Angeles (United States)

Report :

Position	Name	Points
1.	Brian Shaw	43.5
2.	Nick Best	38
3.	Travis Ortmayer	35
4.	Marshall White	31.5
5.	Kevin Nee	(withdrew)28
6.	Pete Konradt	26.5

== All-American Strongman Challenge 2010 ==
Dates: 23, 24 January 2010
Location: Los Angeles Convention Center, Los Angeles (California) (United States) Sponsor:Gaspari Nutrition Report : The All-American Strongman Challenge, once again at the bodybuilding.com/Los Angeles FitExpo, was in 2010 a truly international field. Organised by Odd Haugen, the event drew its largest crowd ever. In addition to the title and prize money, the winner was guaranteed an invitation to the Arnold Strongman Classic contest, as well as one to the Mohegan Sun Grand Prix.

=== Results ===
Position	Name	Points
1.	Nick Best	70
2.	Mark Felix	64
3.	Louis-Philippe Jean	59
4.	Josh Thigpen	56.0
5.	Terry Hollands	53.5
6.	Robert Szczepanski	50.0
7.	Marshall White	49.5
8.	David Ostlund	42.0
9.	Karl Gillingham	41.5
10.	Andy Vincent	39.5
11.	Jerry Pritchett	36
12.	Corey St. Clair	26
13.	David Hansen	22
14.	Odd Haugen	15

== All-American Strongman Challenge 2011 ==
Dates: 29, 30 January 2011 Location: Los Angeles Convention Center, Los Angeles (California) (United States) Sponsor:Gaspari Nutrition The All-American Strongman Challenge was once again hosted by Odd Haugen at the bodybuilding.com/Los Angeles FitExpo. The event included a separate grip contest titled "Vice Grip Viking Challenge" which was won by Mark Felix along with $2,500 in prize money. The top 2 finishers of the strongman contest were guaranteed invitations to the Arnold Strongman Classic contest.

=== Results ===
Position	Name	Points
1.	Terry Hollands	125.5
2.	Nick Best	115.5
3.	Mark Felix	102
4.	Louis-Philippe Jean	101.5
5.	Marshall White	100
6.	Jerry Pritchett	99
7.	Dan Harrison	88
8.	Jean-François Caron	84.5
9.	Josh Thigpen	75.5
10.	Warrick Brant	74

=== Vice Grip Viking Challenge Results ===
Position	Name	Points
1.	Mark Felix	43 $2,500 prize money
2.	Andrew Durniat	40 $1,500 prize money
3.	Chad Woodall	36 $1,000 prize money
4.	Odd Haugen	35
5.	Louis-Philippe Jean	20.5
6.	Jerry Pritchett	8.5
7.	Josh Thigpen	4

== All-American Strongman Challenge 2012 ==
Dates: 28, 29 January 2012

Location: Los Angeles Convention Center, Los Angeles (California)

Sponsor:Met-Rx

The 2012 All-American Strongman Challenge was hosted by Odd Haugen at the Bodybuilding.com/Los Angeles FitExpo. The separate grip contest titled "Vice Grip Viking Challenge" returned for its second year, with Mark Felix retaining his title, along with $1,000 in prize money.

=== Results ===
Position	Name	Points
1.	Mike Burke	47
2.	Stefan Solvi Petursson	44.5
3.	Nick Best	35.5
4.	Josh Thigpen	34.5
5.	Vincent Urbank	32
6.	Jerry Pritchett	28.5
7.	Jamie Rude	19.5
8.	Mark Felix	18.5
9.	Joel Dircks	7

=== Vice Grip Viking Challenge Results ===
Position	Name	Points
1.	Mark Felix	52.5 $1,000 prize money
2.	Mike Burke	49 $600 prize money
3.	Andrew Durniat	48 $400 prize money
4.	Odd Haugen	40
5.	Jerry Pritchett	33.5
6.	Josh Thigpen	29.5
7.	Vincent Urbank	28
8.	Joel Dircks	26.5
8.	Daniel Reinhardt	26.5
10.	Jon Eklund	26
11.	Steve Schmidt	25

== See also ==
- America's Strongest Man
- Arnold Strongman Classic
- North America's Strongest Man
