= Mike Burke (strongman) =

American strongman

- Born: Mike Burke; 14 June 1974 (age 51) (United States) Aurora, Colorado
- Other names: Big Mike
- Occupation: Strongman
- Height: 6 ft 6 in (1.98 m)
- Title: America's Strongest Man
- Spouse: Maree Burke
- Children: Michael; Isabella

Competition record

Strongman

Representing United States

World's Strongest Man
Qualified	2012 World's Strongest Man	
5th	2013 World's Strongest Man	
4th	2014 World's Strongest Man	
5th	2015 World's Strongest Man	

Arnold Strongman Classic
5th	2012 Arnold Strongman Classic	
5th	2013 Arnold Strongman Classic	
3rd	2014 Arnold Strongman Classic	
4th	2015 Arnold Strongman Classic	

Strongman Champions League
2nd	2013 Russia	

Giants Live
3rd	2012 Australia	
1st	2013 Hungary	

America's Strongest Man
3rd	2011	
1st	2012	

All-American Strongman Challenge
9th	2008	
1st	2012	

Vice-Grip Viking Challenge
2nd	2012	
1st	2013	

Arnold Amateur Strongman World Championships
3rd	2011	

Olympia Strongman Challenge
1st	2011	

Mike Burke (born June 14, 1974) is an American strongman and a grip strength specialist from Aurora, Colorado. Before becoming a strength athlete, he worked as a construction worker.

== Career ==
Burke won the 2012 All-American Strongman Challenge in January 2012 which qualified him for the 2012 Arnold Strongman Classic where he won fifth place. He also placed third at 2012 Giants Live Melbourne which qualified Burke for the 2012 World's Strongest Man, though he couldn't reach the finals. A few days later, he competed in the 2012 America's Strongest Man contest and won first place.

Burke competed in the 2013 World's Strongest Man in Sanya, China and qualified for the finals where he emerged fifth place. In September, he won second place at the 2013 Strongman Champions League Russia. In the same year, Burke delivered arguably the single most dominating performance ever seen in a grip competition by winning the 2013 'Visegrip Viking', defeating a stacked field which included Odd Haugen, Mark Felix and Alexey Tyukalov. He officially closed the Captains of Crush No. 3.5 (146 kg; 322 lb), RGC 175) gripper, broke Captains of Crush silver bullet hold world record with a performance of 53.97 seconds, broke the most reps with 78 kg (172 lb) Thomas Inch Dumbbell in two-minutes world record with 37 reps, and twice broke the double overhand Apollon's Axle deadlift world record with 230 and 235 kg (507 and 518 lb).

Burke competed in 2014 World's Strongest Man in Los Angeles, California, qualified for the finals and won fourth place which is his best performance in World's Strongest Man. He also broke two World Records in the 12.5 kg (28 lb) Keg toss event in 2014 Strongman Champions League China's Guinness World Records dual with Hafþór Júlíus Björnsson by clearing 7.50 and 7.70 metres (24 ft 7 in and 25 ft 3 in). In his last performance at the 2015 World's Strongest Man in Putrajaya, Malaysia, Burke secured fifth place.

During 2016 Rogue Record Breakers, Burke set a world record in the Thomas Inch Dumbbell farmers walk, carrying two dumbbells each weighing 78 kg (172 lb) in each hand and walking them for 37.52 metres (123 ft 1 in).

== Personal records ==
- Deadlift – 380 kg (838 lb) (Raw) (2012 Arnold Europe)
- Log press – 200 kg (441 lb) (2014 Arnold Strongman Classic)
- Cyr Dumbbell press – 124.5 kg (274 lb) x 5 reps (2015 Arnold Strongman Classic)
- Apollon's Wheels (cleans only) – 208 kg (459 lb) x 3 times (2012 Arnold Strongman Classic)
- Max Atlas stone – 205 kg (452 lb) x 5 reps (2013 Arnold Strongman Classic)
- Atlas stones – 5 stones 150–210 kg (331–463 lb) in 50.23 seconds (2015 World's Strongest Man)
- Bale Tote (super yoke) – 640 kg (1,411 lb) for 4 metres in 7.50 seconds (2014 Arnold Strongman Classic)
- Timber carry (on 40' inclined ramp) – 400 kg (882 lb) in 10.74 seconds (Raw grip) (2014 Arnold Strongman Classic)
- Fingal's Fingers – 5 fingers 200–320 kg (441–705 lb) in 33.36 seconds (2013 World's Strongest Man - Group 4)
- Keg toss (max) – 12.5 kg (28 lb) over 7.70 metres (25 ft 3 in) (2014 SCL Guinness World Records China) (former joint-world record)
- Keg toss – 8 kegs (18–25 kg (40–55 lb)) over 4.90 metres (16 ft 1 in) in 28.94 seconds (2014 World's Strongest Man)
- Weight over bar – 25 kg (55 lb) over 5.82 metres (19 ft 1 in) (2013 SCL Russia) (former joint unofficial world record)
- Front Hold – 25 kg (55 lb) for 70.17 seconds (2012 Arnold Europe)
- Captains of Crush gripper – No. 3.5 (146 kg; 322 lb), RGC 175) (2013 Visegrip Viking)
- Captains of Crush silver bullet hold – No. 3 for 53.97 seconds (2013 Visegrip Viking) (former world record)
- IronMind Rolling Thunder (V3) – 128 kg (282 lb) (2013 Visegrip Viking, San Jose and 2014 Visegrip Viking) (former world record)
- IronMind Little Big Horn – 80 kg (176 lb) (2013 Visegrip Viking, San Jose)
- Thomas Inch Dumbbell lift (for reps) – 78 kg (172 lb) x 37 times in 120 seconds (2013 Visegrip Viking) (World Record)
- Double Thomas Inch Dumbbells farmers walk – 78 kg (172 lb) in each hand for 37.52 metres (123 ft 1 in) (2016 Rogue Record Breakers) (former world record)
- Double overhand IronMind Apollon's Axle Deadlift – 235 kg (518 lb) (2013 Visegrip Viking) (former world record) (the thickness of this Axle is 2 in (51 mm))
