= Brian Neese =

American strength athlete

Bryan Neese
- Born: Bryan Neese; August 30, 1964 (age 62); United States
- Occupation: Strongman
- Height: 6 ft 1 in (1.85 m)
- Title: America's Strongest Man
- Partner: Erica Neese
- Children: Steele Neese, Rebecca Neese, Stone Neese

Competition record

Strongman

Representing United States

World's Strongest Man
Qualified	1999 World's Strongest Man

America's Strongest Man
1st	1999

Survival of the Strongest
2nd	1999

Strongest Man Alive
3rd	1999

IFSA
6th	1999 Holland Grand Prix
7th	1999 Hungary Grand Prix

Bryan Neese (born August 30, 1964) is an American professional strongman competitor. Bryan is best known for winning the 1999 America's Strongest Man contest, his career best win.

Bryan also spends time ministering the gospel to children, and supports the Paul Anderson Youth Home with the proceeds he receives from his appearances. Bryan currently works as a weightlifting Coach at Brownsburg High School in Brownsburg, Indiana.

== Personal records ==
- Squat: 630 pounds (290 kg)
- Bench Press: 600 pounds (270 kg)
- Deadlift: 700 pounds (320 kg)
- Military press: 405 pounds (184 kg)
- Keg toss: 12.5 kg (28 lb) over 6.10 metres (20 ft 0 in) (1999 IFSA Hungary Grand Prix)

America's Strongest Man
Preceded by: Karl Gillingham	First (1999)	Succeeded by: Brian Schoonveld
