= Travis Ortmayer =

American strength athlete

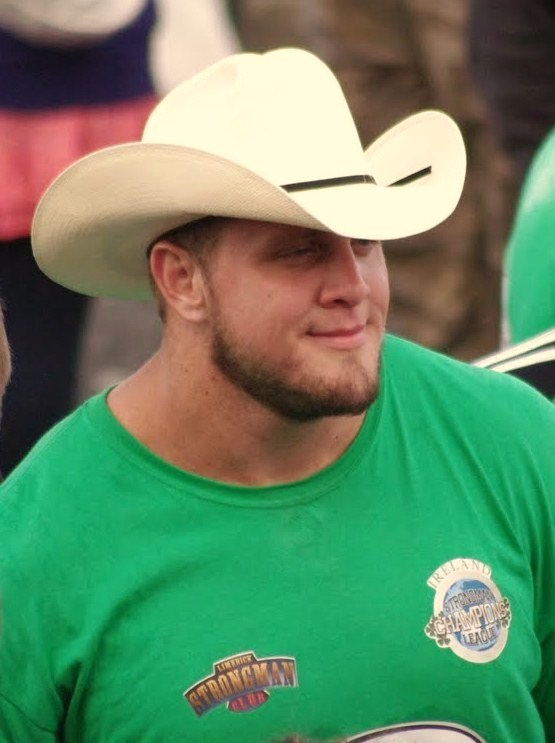
- Born: August 9, 1981 (age 45); Cypress, Texas
- Other name: The Texas Stoneman
- Occupations: Strongman, powerlifting
- Title: America's Strongest Man

Competition record

Strongman

Representing United States

World's Strongest Man
5th	2008 World's Strongest Man
5th	2009 World's Strongest Man
5th	2010 World's Strongest Man
Qualified	2011 World's Strongest Man
Qualified	2021 World's Strongest Man

IFSA Strongman World Championships
10th	2005
10th	2006
Qualified	2007

Arnold Strongman Classic
10th	2007
3rd	2009
3rd	2010
4th	2011
9th	2012

Fortissimus
5th	2008
4th	2009

IFSA Pan-American Championships
2nd	2005

IFSA Strongman World Team Championships
2nd	2005 Team Pan-America

IFSA
1st	2006 Cyprus Grand Prix

All-American Strongman Challenge
2nd	2005
1st	2006
1st	2008
3rd	2009

Giants Live
2nd	2009 Mohegan Sun Grand Prix
1st	2009 Viking Power Challenge

Strongman Super Series
1st	2008 Madison Square Garden

Strongman Champions League
2nd	2008 Latvia
3rd	2008 Holland
3rd	2009 Serbia
1st	2009 Germany FIBO
2nd	2009 Ukraine SCL 2009 Finals
3rd	2010 Germany FIBO
3rd	2010 Finland
5th	2010 Ireland
4th	2010 Bulgaria
1st	2010 Holland
6th	2011 Germany FIBO
6th	2011 Canada SCL 2011 Semi-finals
1st	2021 Portugal

America's Strongest Man
3rd	2006
2nd	2009
1st	2011

Travis Ortmayer (born August 9, 1981) is an American professional Strongman athlete from Cypress, Texas. He is nicknamed the Texas Stoneman due to his many world records in the Atlas Stone event.

== Early life ==
Ortmayer was born in Lake Tahoe, Nevada. His strongman training facility was called "The Unit"; his father Roger also trained with him. He was supported by his mother, Sonja and his late sister Tara.

== Strength sports ==
Ortmayer started out training in bodybuilding in his early teens and eventually decided to train and compete in powerlifting. He met Marshall White, who introduced him to the Strongman sport. In 2002, Marshall and Ortmayer formed "the Unit" strongman training grounds in Cypress, Texas. "The Unit" was also joined by World's Strongest Man competitor Josh Thigpen and professional strongman Jim Glassman. Ortmayer earned his American Strongman Corporation (ASC) Professional Strongman card by winning the 2004 NAS US Amateur National Championships.

The International Federation of Strength Athletes (IFSA) split from the TWI (Trans World International) World's Strongest Man (WSM) contest in 2005. IFSA held the first and only Pan-American Championship in 2005 at São Paulo, Brazil, as a qualifier for the 2005 IFSA Strongman World Championships. Ortmayer competed in this qualifier and placed 2nd overall behind 2006 WSM winner Phil Pfister. Ortmayer also set a World Record for the Atlas Stones: Light Set strength event. His placement qualified him to compete in the inaugural 2005 IFSA Strongman World Championships being held in Quebec City, Canada. During the World Championship, Ortmayer set another World Record in the Atlas Stones, this time with the Heavy Set. Ortmayer ultimately placed 10th overall in the World Championships.

In 2006 Ortmayer eventually won his first international competition in Cyprus at the IFSA Cyprus Grand Prix. This was one week after attaining a pectoralis injury at the 2006 World Strongman Challenge in Tulsa, Oklahoma. Ortmayer went on to win all three National Championship Qualifiers.

At the 2006 America's Strongest Man, Ortmayer was 1.5 points away from victory, but took home 3rd place overall. His performance, however, earned him an invite by strength sport historian Terry Todd to compete in his contest, the Arnold Strongman Classic contest, 2007, in Columbus, Ohio. Ortmayer also qualified to compete in the 2006 IFSA World Championship being held in Reykjavík, Iceland.

Ortmayer suffered a shoulder injury, and lost 25 lbs. He competed in the 2006 IFSA World Championships. He maintained his Atlas Stone: Light Set world record, but lost his Heavy Set world record to the 2006 Champion Žydrūnas Savickas. Ortmayer placed 10th overall.

Ortmayer then went on to compete in the exclusive 2007 Arnold Strongman Classic competition. During the Timber Frame Carry, he injured his right foot; the timber frame dropped on his foot when his heel made contact with the apparatus. During the Hummer Tire Deadlift, Ortmayer also injured his back, and was waived out of the competition by the attending doctor. Ortmayer did come back to compete in the final event, the Circus Dumbbell press, but was unable to complete the event due to his previous injuries. He placed 10th overall.

Ortmayer went on to compete in the 2007 Fresno Pro-Am (USA National Championship Qualifier). He won this contest, which qualified him to compete in the 2007 America's Strongest Man (USA National Championship). During the USA National Championship, Ortmayer re-injured his back on the second event, the Tire Deadlift, and pulled out of the competition.

Ortmayer has since gone on to compete in two team contests. The USA vs. World contest put on by Al Thompson in June 2007 in Philadelphia, US, was his first. Ortmayer and his team (Derek Poundstone, Van Hatfield, Nick Best and Walt Gogola) pulled out a victory against the three of the top five European strongmen in the World, (Žydrūnas Savickas, Vasyl Virastyuk and Andrus Murumets. The contest was a tie going into the final event, the Atlas Stones. Team USA pulled out a victory in Ortmayer's signature event to capture the win overall. His next team contest was the World's Strongest Nation, held in Ukraine in August 2007. This time Team USA consisted of Ortmayer along with Derek Poundstone, Tom McClure and Brian Shaw. Team USA placed 2nd overall.

Ortmayer competed in the 2007 IFSA Strongamn World Championships in Geumsan, South Korea. The qualifying heats consisted of four events, and the top two from each heat of four athletes would go on to the finals. Ortmayer finished third overall in his heat and failed to qualify for the finals.

Ortmayer and his father Roger Ortmayer opened the elite personal training gym Athletic Nation in 2007. Ortmayer worked the microphone at the Arnold Strongman contest in March 2008.

Ortmayer took some time during late 2007 to let his body recover and to build up base strength levels. He achieved his goal of an 800 lb deadlift on December 1, 2007, in a powerlifting meet. Since then he has gone on to win every contest he has competed in, as of March 15, 2008. In doing so, he has qualified for the World's Strongest Man Super Series 2008 and America's Strongest Man 2008. Ortmayer was invited to compete in the Fortissimus – Decathlon of Strength competition held in Canada the last weekend of June.

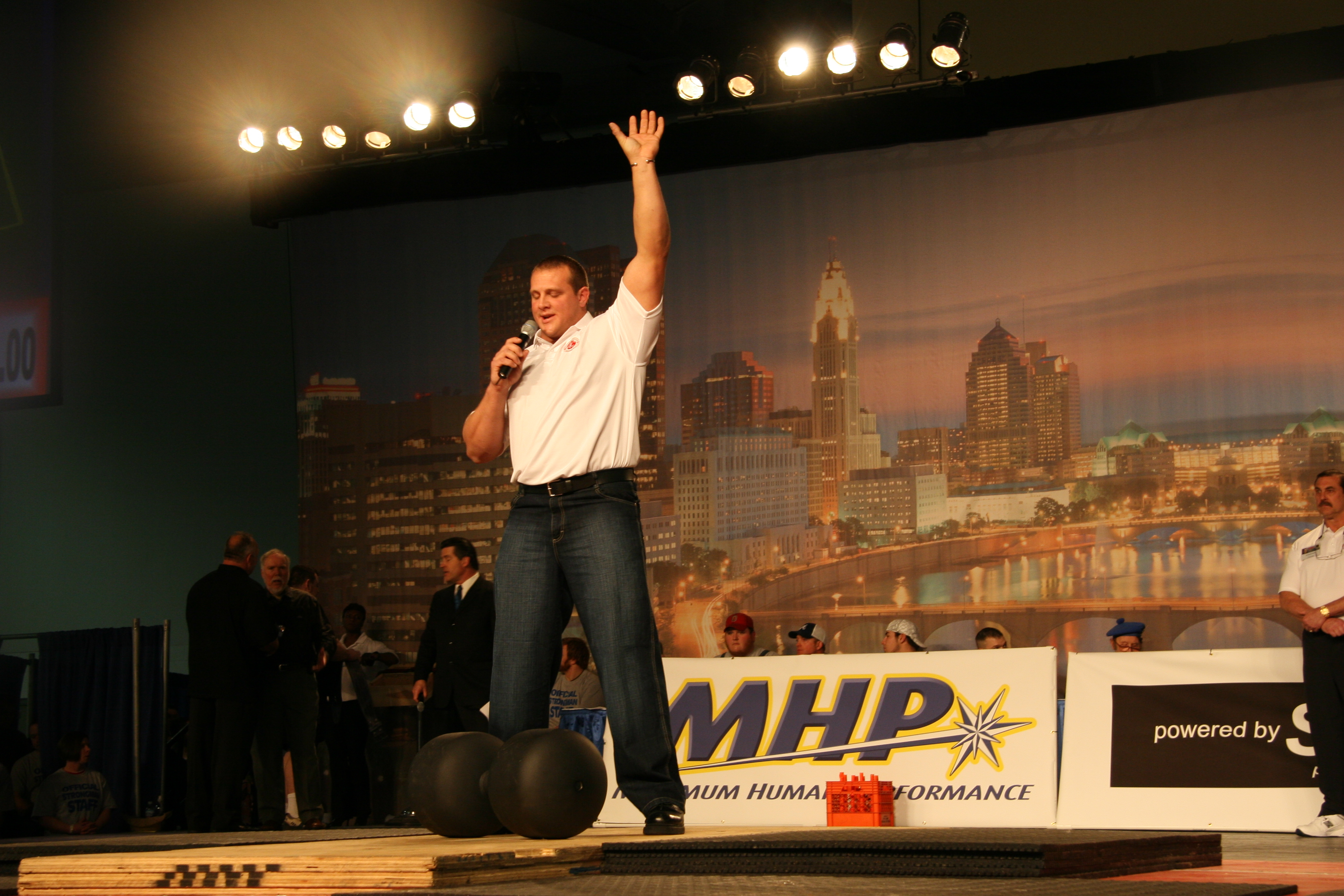
MC ORT Ortmayer on the mic at the 2008 Arnold Strongest Man demonstrating to the large crowd how to do the Circus Dumbbell event Photo by Chris Chapman

Ortmayer competed in the Strongman Champions League 2008 Latvia contest and finished a close second behind Žydrūnas Savickas. He beat out champion competitors including Mikhail Koklyaev, Andrus Murumets, and Oleksandr Pekanov.

On April 2, 2008, Ortmayer signed on to compete against Derek Poundstone at the Madison Square Garden Super Series on June 21, 2008. He won the Madison Square Garden Super Series by defeating Derek Poundstone into second place.

Ortmayer competed in the 2008 World's Strongest Man competition, his first time in the contest. During the qualifiers, Ortmayer took first overall in his qualifying group. Ortmayer still finished in fifth place overall in the finals. Ortmayer would go on to finish fifth at both the 2009 World's Strongest Man and 2010 World's Strongest Man contests in the finals. Ortmayer suffered an injury during the qualifying heats of the 2011 World's Strongest Man contest, was forced to withdraw from the contest, and did not make the finals.

In 2021, Ortmayer returned to the World's Strongest Man competition after 10 years, but failed to make the final.

== Personal records ==
Strongman

- Deadlift – 395 kg (871 lb) (2008 Madison Square Garden Grand Prix)
- Log press – 170 kg (375 lb) (2009 Viking Power Challenge)
- Log press (for reps) – 136 kg (300 lb) × 13 reps (2009 All American Challenge (Fit Expo))
- Axle press – 186 kg (410 lb) (2009 Giants Live Mohegan Sun)
- Manhood Stone (Max Atlas Stone) – 243 kg (536 lb) over 4 ft (48 in) bar (2011 Arnold Strongman Classic)
- Manhood Stone (Max Atlas Stone) – 242 kg (534 lb) × 3 reps over 4 ft (48 in) bar (2010 Arnold Strongman Classic)
- Atlas stones – 5 stones weighing 120–160 kg (265–353 lb) in 15.42 seconds (2006 United Strongman Series Cyprus) (World Record)
- Atlas stones – 5 stones weighing 125–215 kg (276–474 lb) in 26.18 seconds (2009 Giants Live Mohegan Sun) (World Record)
- Atlas stones (IFSA circle setup) – 5 stones weighing 120–170 kg (265–375 lb) in 19.20 seconds (2006 IFSA World Championships, group 3) (World Record)
- Medley – 408.5 kg (901 lb) tire flip × 4 into 172.5 kg (380 lb) per hand farmers walk for 15m course in 21.44 seconds (2008 Strongman Super Series Madison Square Garden Grand Prix) (World Record)

Powerlifting (USAPL, Raw)

- Squat – 341 kg (752 lb) (2007 Cypress Texas games)
- Bench Press – 215 kg (474 lb) (2007 Cypress Texas games)
- Squat – 364 kg (802 lb) (2007 Cypress Texas games)
- Total – 921 kg (2,030 lb) (2007 Cypress Texas games)

== Achievements ==
Professional competitive record – 1st (13), 2nd (6), 3rd (8) – out of total (39)
Performance metric – .909 [American – .943, International – .875]

Professional	1st	2nd	3rd	4th	5th	6th	7th	8th	9th	10th	INJ	DNQ	Total
American	11	2	4								2		19
International	7	8	6	3	2	1		1		3		1	31
Combined	18	10	10	3	2	1		1		3	2	1	50

Completed contests

- Strongman Champions League – Serbia – Serbia – 2nd place (7/14/2018)
- (United States) America's Strongest Man (USA National Championship) Morgantown, West Virginia USA – 2nd place (7/25-26/2009
- Fortissimus – Louis Cyr Strength Challenge -Montmagny, Quebec, Canada – 4th place (6/27-28/2009
- Viking Power Challenge (Giants Live WSM Qualifier) – Stavanger, Norway – Winner (6/6/2009)
- (United States) Mohegan Sun Grand Prix (Giants Live WSM Qualifier) – Uncasville, Connecticut, US – 2nd place (5/17/2009)
- Strongman Champions League – Serbia – Subotica, Serbia – 2nd place (tie) (5/9/2009)
- FIBO Strongman Classic – Essen, Germany – Winner (4/25/2009)
- (United States) American Strongman – Show of Champions – – Orlando, Florida, US – Winner (4/17-18/2009)
- (United States) Arnold's Strongest Man – Columbus, Ohio, US – 3rd place (3/6-7/2009)
- (United States) All American Strongman Challenge / Fit Expo (World's Strongest Man Super Series Qualifier) – Los Angeles, California, US – 3rd place (1/24-25/2009)
- (United States) World's Strongest Man – Charleston, West Virginia, US – 5th place (9/12-14/2008)
- (United States) World's Strongest Man Qualifying Round – Charleston, West Virginia, US – Winner group 5 (9/9/2008)
- World's Strongest Nation Team Competition – Crimea, Ukraine – 4th place (8/6-8/2008)
- Fortissimus – Louis Cyr Strength Challenge – Notre-Dame-Du-Rosaire, Quebec, Canada – 5th place (6/28-29/2008)
- (United States) Madison Square Garden Super Series (World's Strongest Man Qualifier) – New York, US – Winner (6/21/2008)
- (South Holland) Strongman Champions League – Holland – Varsseveld, Holland – 3rd place (6/1/2008)
- Strongman Champions League – Latvia – Riga, Latvia – 2nd place (3/22/2008)
- (United States) St. Patrick's Strongman (USA National Championship Qualifier) – Columbia, South Carolina, US – Winner (3/15/2008)
- (United States) Nutrition Depot Strongman Expo – Cypress, Texas, US – Winner (3/8/2008)
- (United States) All American Challenge / Fit Expo (World's Strongest Man Super Series Qualifier) – Los Angeles, California, US – Winner (2/17/2008)
- IFSA World Championships-Qualifiers – Geumsan, South Korea – 3rd in heat (9/12/2007)
- IFSA World Open Championship – Geumsan, South Korea – Winner (9/10/2007)
- World's Strongest Nation Team Competition – Ukraine – 2nd place (8/6/2007)
- (United States) USA vs. World Team Competition – Philadelphia, Pennsylvania, US – Winner (7/1/2007)
- (United States) America's Strongest Man (USA National Championship) – Charlotte, North Carolina, US – injured (5/26/2007)
- (United States) Clovis/Fresno Pro-Am (USA National Championship Qualifier) – Fresno, California, US – Winner (4/21/2007)
- (United States) Arnold's Strongest Man – Columbus, Ohio, US – 10th place (3/4/2007)
- Ukraine Strongman Contest – Ukraine – 6th place (2006)
- IFSA World Championship – Reykjavik, Iceland – 10th place (11/25/2006)
- USA vs. Lithuania Team Competition – Lithuania – 2nd place (10/20/2006)
- Lithuania Grand Prix – Marijampole, Lithuania – 8th place (8/19/2006)
- World's Strongest Nation Team Competition – Kyiv, Ukraine – 3rd place (8/3/2006)
- (United States) America's Strongest Man (USA National Championship) – Charlotte, North Carolina, US – 3rd place (7/22/2006)
- (United States) Liberty City Strongman Classic (USA Nationals Qualifier) – Philadelphia, Pennsylvania, US – Winner (7/1/2006)
- (United States) Utah's Strongest Man (USA National Championship Qualifier) – Utah, US – Winner (6/10/2006)
- Hungary Grand Prix – Eger, Hungary – 3rd place (6/5/2006)
- Cyprus Grand Prix – Island of Cyprus – Winner (5/28/2006)
- (United States) World Strongman Challenge (USA Grand Prix) – Tulsa, Oklahoma, US – injured (5/21/2006)
- Dubai Grand Prix – Dubai, United Arab Emirates – 4th place (4/25/2006)
- (United States) St. Patrick's Strongman (USA National Championship Qualifier) – Columbia, South Carolina, US – Winner (3/18/2006)
- (United States) Iron Man Fit Expo Strongman Championship – Pasadena, California, US – Winner (2/19/2006)
- (Netherlands Antilles) IFSA World Team Championships – St. Maarten Island – 2nd place (12/10/2005)
- World's Strongest Nation Team Competition – Sevestopol, Ukraine – 3rd place (10/21/2005)
- IFSA World Championship – Quebec, Canada – 10th place (9/24/2005)
- Pan-American Championship – São Paulo, Brazil – 2nd place (8/20/2005)
- (United States) Utah's Strongest Man – Mapleton, Utah, US – Winner (7/23/2005)
- (United States) Liberty City Strongman Classic – Philadelphia, Pennsylvania, US 3rd place (7/2/2005)
- (United States) Hawaii's Strongest Man – Honolulu, Hawaii, US – 3rd place (4/17/2005)
- (United States) Kansas City Pro-Am – Kansas City, Missouri, US – Winner (2/26/2005)
- (United States) The Fit Expo Strongman Championship – Pasadena, California, US – 2nd place (2/19/2005)

Amateur competitive record – 1st (7), 2nd (1), 3rd (2) – out of total (12)]
Performance metric – .941

Amateur	1st	2nd	3rd	4th	5th	6th	7th	8th	9th	10th	11th	12th	Total
American	7	1	2		1							1	12

- (United States) USA Amateur National Championship – Heavyweight Division (NAS) (Amateur Platinum Plus Level Competition) – winner (10/10/2004) earned ASC Professional Strongman Card
- (United States) Midwest Open (Amateur Platinum Level Competition) – Missouri, US – 1st place tie (7/31/2004)
- (United States) Strongman Record Breakers (Amateur Platinum Level Competition) – Illinois, US – winner (7/03/2004)
- (United States) Music City Strongman (Amateur Platinum Level Competition) – Tennessee, US – winner (6/12/2004)
- (United States) Show Me Pro-Am (Amateur Platinum Plus Level Competition) – St. Louis, Missouri, US – 3rd place (5/08/2004)
- (United States) Monster's of the Midwest (Amateur Platinum Level Competition) – Missouri, US – 3rd place (12/6/2003)
- (United States) USA Amateur National Championship – HW Division (Amateur Platinum Level Competition) – 12th place (10/4/2003)
- (United States) South Carolina's Strongest Man (Amateur Gold Level Competition) – South Carolina, US – winner (8/16/2003)
- (United States) Texas's Strongest Man (Amateur Gold Level Competition) – Texas, US – winner (7/12/2003)
- (United States) Texas's Summer Strongman (Amateur Gold Level Competition) – Texas, US – 2nd place tie (5/10/2003)
- (United States) Pure Power Strongman Contest (Amateur Gold Level Competition) – winner (4/26/2003)
- (United States) Texas's Strongest Man (Amateur Gold Level Competition) – Texas, US – 5th place (8/03/2002)
