= 2002 World's Strongest Man =

Strongman competition in 2002

Competition information
- Dates: 15-23 September 2002
- Location: Kuala Lumpur
- Country: Malaysia
- Athletes participating: 30
- Nations participating: 18

Champion(s)
- (Poland) Mariusz Pudzianowski

The 2002 World's Strongest Man was the 25th edition of the international World's Strongest Man competition, and was won by Mariusz Pudzianowski from Poland. The contest was held in Kuala Lumpur, Malaysia.

== Qualifying heats ==
=== Heat 1 ===
- Events: Carry & Drag (Farmer's Walk & Drag Chain & Anchor), Weight Throw, Fingal's Fingers, Car Pull, Giant Log Lift for Reps, Atlas Stones

#	Name	Nationality	Pts
1	Svend Karlsen	Norway	31
2	Jarek Dymek	Poland	26
3	Jesse Marunde	United States	22
4	Bernd Kerschbaumer	Austria	21
5	Jessen Paulin	Canada	17
6	Stuart Murray	Scotland	8

=== Heat 2 ===
- Events: Carry & Flip (Farmer's Walk & Tyre Flip), Max Log Press, Fingal's Fingers, Lorry Pull, Basque Circle (Connan Circle), Atlas Stones

#	Name	Nationality	Pts
1	Raimonds Bergmanis	Latvia	28
2	Juha-Matti Räsänen	Finland	25
3	Brian Schoonveld	United States	23.5
4	Jarno Hams	Netherlands	22
5	Heinz Ollesch	Germany	21.5
6	Marc Iliffe	England	3 (injury)

=== Heat 3 ===
- Events: Carry & Drag (Farmer's Walk & Drag Chain & Anchor), Weight Throw, Fingal's Fingers, Car Pull, Basque Circle (Connan Circle), Atlas Stones

#	Name	Nationality	Pts
1	Magnus Samuelsson	Sweden	31
2	Gregor Edmunds	Scotland	28
3	René Minkwitz	Denmark	24
4	Steve Kirit	United States	20
5	Derek Boyer	Australia	14
6	Nigel Moss	South Africa	8

=== Heat 4 ===
- Events: Carry & Flip (Farmer's Walk & Tyre Flip), Weight Throw, Fingal's Fingers, Car Pull, Giant Log Lift for Reps, Atlas Stones

#	Name	Nationality	Pts
1	Johnny Perry	United States	33.5
2	Zydrunas Savickas	Lithuania	32.5
3	Jón Valgeir Williams	Iceland	17.5
4	David Warner	England	16
5	Odd Haugen	Norway	11 (injury)
6	Janne Virtanen	Finland	9.5 (injury)

=== Heat 5 ===
- Events: Carry & Drag (Farmer's Walk & Drag Chain & Anchor), Max Log Press, Fingal's Fingers, Lorry Pull, Basque Circle (Connan Circle), Atlas Stones

#	Name	Nationality	Pts
1	Hugo Girard	Canada	29
2	Mariusz Pudzianowski	Poland	26.5
3	Karl Gillingham	United States	22.5
4	Mick Gosling	England	19
5	Torbjörn Samuelsson	Sweden	17.5
6	Tibor Meszaros	Hungary	11.5

== Final results ==
#	Name	Nationality	Pts
1	Mariusz Pudzianowski	Poland	58
2	Zydrunas Savickas	Lithuania	50
3	Raimonds Bergmanis	Latvia	47.5
4	Johnny Perry	United States	42
5	Svend Karlsen	Norway	39
6	Juha-Matti Räsänen	Finland	38.5
7	Hugo Girard	Canada	38.5
8	Gregor Edmunds	Scotland	28.5
9	Jarek Dymek	Poland	24.5
10	Magnus Samuelsson	Sweden	12.5 (Injured)

Ranking	Name	Nationality	Total points	Event 1 Flip & Drag (Tyre Flip & Drag Chain & Anchor)	Event 2 Farmer's Walk	Event 3 Squat Lift for Reps	Event 4 Lorry Pull	Event 5 Asia Stone	Event 6 Car Deadlift for Reps	Event 7 Atlas Stones
1	Mariusz Pudzianowski	Poland	58	1 (39.01s)	1 (33.95s)	6 (4 reps)	2 (44.38s)	1 (127.40m)	4 (8 reps)	3 (5 in 55.40s)
2	Zydrunas Savickas	Lithuania	50	2 (46.55s)	3 (44.28s)	4 (6 reps)	1 (43.97s)	6 (81.00m)	2 (9 reps)	8 (4 in 54.75s)
3	Raimonds Bergmanis	Latvia	47.5	8 (27.00m)	4 (50.37s)	4 (6 reps)	8 (64.56s)	3 (107.75m)	1 (11 reps)	1 (5 in 41.05s)
4	Johnny Perry	United States	42	10 (22.10m)	5 (53.96s)	3 (9 reps)	5 (46.21s)	5 (81.90m)	4 (8 reps)	2 (5 in 43.86s)
5	Svend Karlsen	Norway	39	7 (28.50m)	8 (72.60m)	1 (14 reps)	4 (46.00s)	7 (79.60m)	4 (8 reps)	6 (4 in 30.28s)
6	Juha-Matti Rasanen	Finland	38.5	9 (24.95m)	2 (40.07s)	7 (3 reps)	9 (27.40m)	2 (112.35m)	2 (9 reps)	7 (4 in 32.65s)
7	Hugo Girard	Canada	38.5	6 (29.90m)	7 (55.06s)	2 (12 reps)	3 (44.84s)	9 (68.55m)	7 (6 reps)	4 (4 in 28.11s)
8	Gregor Edmunds	Scotland	27.5	4 (61.03s)	10 (30.00m)	8 (1 rep)	7 (61.06s)	4 (107.50m)	9 (0 reps)	5 (4 in 29.62s)
9	Jarek Dymek	Poland	24.5	5 (69.35s)	6 (54.34s)	10 (0 reps)	6 (52.03s)	8 (70.35m)	7 (6 reps)	9 (3 in 23.97s)
10	Magnus Samuelsson	Sweden	12.5	3 (51.96s)	9 (70.00m)	8 (1 rep)	(Injured)	(Injured)	(Injured)	(Injured)

Preceded by 2001 World's Strongest Man	2002 World's Strongest Man	Succeeded by 2003 World's Strongest Man
