= Strength athletics in the United States =

Strength athletics in the United States refers to the various strongman competitions organized throughout United States and North America with the elements of all of strength athletics taken into account. United States has held a preeminent position as a nation due to the enormous success of its competitors on the international stage, who between Bruce Wilhelm, Don Reinhoudt, Bill Kazmaier, Mark Henry, Phil Pfister, Derek Poundstone, Brian Shaw, Mike Jenkins and Martins Licis have won twelve World's Strongest Man titles, eight Arnold Strongman Classic titles, in addition to numerous other international strongman competitions won by various different athletes. United States has both amateur and professional sanctioning bodies in the sport.

== History ==
American Strongman Corporation ("ASC") is the sole sanctioning body for all professional American strength athletes and organizes the annual America's Strongest Man contest, as well as the NAS US Amateur National Championships, the winner of which receives their pro card to compete in professional contests. North American Strongman ("NASM") organizes the majority of the amateur contests in the United States, and holds pro qualifier events and national championship events throughout the year with men's, woman's, teen's and master's divisions as well as lightweight and heavyweight classes similar to ASC.

United States Strongman is a relatively new organization.

== National Competitions ==
=== America's Strongest Man ===
America's Strongest Man
Tournament information
- Location: United States
- Established: 1997
- Format: Multi-event competition

Current champion
- (United States) Martel Johnson

America's Strongest Man is an annual strongman competition held in the United States and featuring only American athletes. It is the most prestigious of the national titles. The contest was established in 1997 in Primm, Nevada, with Mark Philippi winning the inaugural contest. It has been held twenty-nine times in eighteen locations across the United States and has produced twenty-one champions.

Derek Poundstone and Lucas Hatton shares the record for the highest number of wins with three, while Brian Shaw, Dimitar Savatinov, Steve Kirit and Brian Schoonveld share two wins each.

==== Champions breakdown ====
| Year | Champion | Runner-up | 3rd Place | Location |
|---|---|---|---|---|
| 1997 | (United States) Mark Phillipi | (United States) Harold Collins | (United States) Tommy Ingalsbe | Primm, Nevada |
| 1998 | (United States) Karl Gillingham | (United States) Doug Ahr | (United States) Harold Collins (United States) Odd Haugen | Las Vegas, Nevada |
| 1999 | (United States) Brian Neese | (United States) Ken Brown | (United States) Odd Haugen | Honolulu, Hawaii |
| 2000 | (United States) Brian Schoonveld | (United States) Phil Pfister | (United States) Whit Baskin | Maryland Heights, Missouri |
| 2001 | (United States) Brian Schoonveld (2) | (United States) Phil Pfister | (United States) Johnny Perry | Kokomo, Indiana |
| 2002 | (United States) Steve Kirit | (United States) Johnny Perry | (United States) Karl Gillingham | St. Louis, Missouri |
| 2003 | (United States) Steve Kirit (2) | (United States) Phil Pfister | (United States) Mark Phillipi | St. Louis, Missouri |
| 2004 | (United States) Van Hatfield | (United States) Phil Pfister | (United States) Karl Gillingham | Atlanta, Georgia |
| 2005 | Event not held | | | |
| 2006 | (United States) Steve MacDonald | (United States) Jon Andersen | (United States) Travis Ortmayer | Columbia, South Carolina |
| 2007 | (United States) Derek Poundstone | (United States) Nick Best | (United States) Van Hatfield | Charlotte, North Carolina |
| 2008 | (United States) Jason Kristal | (United States) Jason Bergmann | (United States) Van Hatfield | Charleston, West Virginia |
| 2009 | (United States) Derek Poundstone (2) | (United States) Travis Ortmayer | (United States) Andy Vincent | Morgantown, West Virginia |
| 2010 | (United States) Derek Poundstone (3) | (United States) Mike Jenkins | (United States) Marshall White | Las Vegas, Nevada |
| 2011 | (United States) Travis Ortmayer | (United States) Dave Ostlund | (United States) Mike Burke | Hot Springs, Arkansas |
| 2012 | (United States) Mike Burke | (United States) Mike Caruso | (United States) Robert Oberst | Las Vegas, Nevada |
| 2013 | (United States) Brian Shaw | (United States) Robert Oberst | (United States) Dimitar Savatinov | Las Vegas, Nevada |
| 2014 | (United States) Dimitar Savatinov | (United States) Robert Oberst | (United States) John Posen | Phoenix, Arizona |
| 2015 | (United States) Dimitar Savatinov (2) | (United States) Martins Licis | (United States) Scott Weech | Atlanta, Georgia |
| 2016 | (United States) Brian Shaw (2) | (United States) Casey Garrison | (United States) Dimitar Savatinov | St. Louis, Missouri |
| 2017 | (United States) Jerry Pritchett | (United States) Dimitar Savatinov | (United States) Wesley Claborn | Phoenix, Arizona |
| 2018 | (United States) Trey Mitchell | (United States) Jacob Fincher | (United States) Wesley Claborn | Long Beach, California |
| 2019 | (United States) Wesley Claborn | (United States) Trey Mitchell | (United States) Josh Reynolds | Miami Beach, Florida |
| 2020 | (United States) Marcus Crowder | (United States) Tyler Cotton | (United States) Jose Baez | Savannah, Georgia |
| 2021 | (United States) Josh Silvas | (United States) Tyler Cotton | (United States) Marcus Crowder | San Antonio, Texas |
| 2022 | (United States) Bobby Thompson | (United States) Tyler Cotton | (United States) Trey Mitchell | Las Vegas, Nevada |
| 2023 | (United States) Lucas Hatton | (United States) Marcus Crowder | (United States) Rob Kearney | Orlando, Florida |
| 2024 | (United States) Lucas Hatton (2) | (United States) Tim Buck | (United States) Kevin Faires | Las Vegas, Nevada |
| 2025 | (United States) Lucas Hatton (3) | (United States) Nick Guardione | (United States) Austin Hamm | Las Vegas, Nevada |
| 2026 | (United States) Martel Johnson | (United States) Evan Singleton | (United States) Roy Orrantia | Las Vegas, Nevada |

==== Repeat champions ====
| Champion | Times & years |
|---|---|
| (United States) Derek Poundstone | 3 (2007, 2009, 2010) |
| (United States) Lucas Hatton | 3 (2023, 2024, 2025) |
| (United States) Brian Schoonveld | 2 (2000, 2001) |
| (United States) Steve Kirit | 2 (2002, 2003) |
| (United States) Brian Shaw | 2 (2013, 2016) |
| (United States) Dimitar Savatinov | 2 (2014, 2015) |

=== All-American Strongman Challenge ===
A competition started in 2005 which was initially reserved for American athletes but was later opened for international athletes from 2010 until its end in 2012.

| Year | Champion | Runner-up | 3rd Place | Location |
|---|---|---|---|---|
| 2005 | (United States) Brian Schoonveld | (United States) Travis Ortmayer | (United States) Jesse Marunde | Pasadena, California |
| 2006 | (United States) Travis Ortmayer | (United States) Jesse Marunde | (United States) Dave Ostlund | Pasadena, California |
| 2007 | (United States) Karl Gillingham | (United States) Kevin Nee | (United States) Jason Bergmann | Pasadena, California |
| 2008 | (United States) Travis Ortmayer | (United States) Brian Shaw | (United States) Dave Ostlund | Pasadena, California |
| 2009 | (United States) Brian Shaw | (United States) Nick Best | (United States) Travis Ortmayer | Los Angeles, California |
| 2010 | (United States) Nick Best | (United Kingdom) Mark Felix | (Canada) Louis-Philippe Jean | Los Angeles, California |
| 2011 | (United Kingdom) Terry Hollands | (United States) Nick Best | (United Kingdom) Mark Felix | Los Angeles, California |
| 2012 | (United States) Mike Burke | (Iceland) Stefán Sölvi Pétursson | (United States) Nick Best | Los Angeles, California |

=== NAS US Amateur Strongman Championships ===
The Amateur US Nationals were created in 1997 and are held annually in various locations throughout the United States, with the winner of each weight class earning their pro card to compete professionally. Traditionally, the winner of the men's heavyweight class will go on to compete in major national and international strongman contests such as the World's Strongest Man and the Arnold Strongman Classic.

==== Heavyweight Champions ====
| Year | Winner | Venue |
|---|---|---|
| 2004 | (United States) Travis Ortmayer | Indiana, Pennsylvania |
| 2005 | (United States) Tom McClure | Louisville, Kentucky |
| 2009 | (United States) Justin Warren | Carencro, Louisiana |
| 2010 | (United States) Eric Peterson | Reno, Nevada |
| 2011 | (United States) Adam Scherr | Tunica, Mississippi |

=== Other competitions ===
- Rainier Classic
- Santa Monica Classic
- Vice Grip Viking
- Olympia Strongman Challenge
- Clash of the Titans
- Wrath of the Strongest
- North Dakota's Strongest Man
- Georgia's Strongest Man
- Tennessee's Strongest
- Orlando's Strongest
- Strongest on the Coast
- PA Dutch Strong
- Cerberus USA Mid-South Regional

=== America's Strongest Woman ===
America's Strongest Woman was initiated in 2021 and features both American and foreign athletes residing and training in the United States. Over 20 athletes have participated in the competition over the past six years.

| Year | Champion | Runner-up | 3rd Place | Location |
|---|---|---|---|---|
| 2021 | (United States) Victoria Long | (United States) Cori Butler | (United States) Britta Maggard | Orlando, Florida |
| 2022 | (United States) Victoria Long | (Ukraine) Olga Liashchuk | (Puerto Rico) Inez Carrasquillo | Las Vegas, Nevada |
| 2023 | (United States) Angelica Jardine | (Ukraine) Olga Liashchuk | (United States) Cori Butler | Orlando, Florida |
| 2024 | (Ukraine) Olga Liashchuk | (United States) Nadia Stowers | (United States) Erin Murray | Las Vegas, Nevada |
| 2025 | (Ukraine) Olga Liashchuk | (United States) Jackie Rhodes | (United States) Sumer Johnson | Las Vegas, Nevada |
| 2026 | (Puerto Rico) Inez Carrasquillo | (United States) Morgan Irons | (United States) Taylor Doxey | Las Vegas, Nevada |

== Regional Competitions ==
=== North America's Strongest Man ===
North America's Strongest Man
Tournament information
- Location: Quebec
- Established: 1992
- Format: Multi-event competition

Current champion
- (United States) Bryce Johnson

North America's Strongest Man is an annual strongman competition consisting of athletes from both United States and Canada. The event was established in 1992 with Gary Mitchell of the United States winning the inaugural competition.

Despite the three hiatus periods (1994-1997, 2004-2006 and 2015-2022), the competition has been held eighteen times. Canada has produced five champions who shared ten titles among them while United States has produced eight champions with a title each for a total of eight.

The contest has been always held in Quebec.

==== Champions breakdown ====
| Year | Champion | Runner-up | 3rd Place | Location |
|---|---|---|---|---|
| 1992 | (United States) Gary Mitchell | (To be confirmed) | (To be confirmed) | Gatineau, Quebec |
| 1993 | (United States) Steve Pulcinella | (To be confirmed) | (To be confirmed) | Gatineau, Quebec |
| 1994–1997 | Event not held | | | |
| 1998 | (United States) David Brown | (To be confirmed) | (To be confirmed) | Gatineau, Quebec |
| 1999 | (United States) Steve Dmytrow | (To be confirmed) | (To be confirmed) | Gatineau, Quebec |
| 2001 | (Canada) Hugo Girard | (Canada) Geoff Dolan | (United States) Phil Pfister | Gatineau, Quebec |
| 2002 | (Canada) Hugo Girard (2) | (To be confirmed) | (To be confirmed) | Gatineau, Quebec |
| 2003 | (United States) Jon Andersen | (United States) Chad Coy | (United States) Walt Gogola | Gatineau, Quebec |
| 2004–2006 | Event not held | | | |
| 2007 | (Canada) Jessen Paulin | (United States) Brian Shaw | (Canada) Christian Savoie | Gatineau, Quebec |
| 2008 | (Canada) Jessen Paulin | (Canada) Christian Savoie | (United States) Pete Konradt | Gatineau, Quebec |
| 2009 | (Canada) Christian Savoie | (Canada) Jean-François Caron | (United States) Josh Thigpen | Gatineau, Quebec |
| 2010 | (Canada) Christian Savoie (2) | (Canada) Jean-François Caron | (Canada) Scott Cummine | Gatineau, Quebec |
| 2011 | (Canada) Christian Savoie (3) | (Canada) Jean-François Caron | (United States) Karl Gillingham | Gatineau, Quebec |
| 2012 | (Canada) Jean-François Caron | (United States) Dave Ostlund | (Canada) Jackie Ouellett | Gatineau, Quebec |
| 2013 | (Canada) Jean-François Caron (2) | (Canada) Christian Savoie | (United States) Dave Ostlund | Gatineau, Quebec |
| 2014 | (United States) Brian Shaw | (Canada) Jean-François Caron | (Canada) Simon Boudreau | Gatineau, Quebec |
| 2015–2022 | Event not held | | | |
| 2023 | (United States) Trey Mitchell | (United States) Lucas Hatton | (Canada) Wesley Derwinsky | Victoriaville, Quebec |
| 2024 | (Canada) Maxime Boudreault | (United States) Lucas Hatton | (Canada) Tristain Hoath | Victoriaville, Quebec |
| 2025 | (United States) Bryce Johnson | (Canada) Wesley Derwinsky | (United States) Nick Wortham | Victoriaville, Quebec |
| 2026 | (United States) Bryce Johnson (2) | (United States) Trey Mitchell | (United States) Thomas Evans | Victoriaville, Quebec |

- Results courtesy of David Horne's World of Grip: http://www.davidhorne-gripmaster.com/strongmanresults.html

==== Repeat champions ====
| Champion | Times & years |
|---|---|
| (Canada) Christian Savoie | 3 (2009, 2010, 2011) |
| (Canada) Hugo Girard | 2 (2001, 2002) |
| (Canada) Jessen Paulin | 2 (2007, 2008) |
| (Canada) Jean-François Caron | 2 (2012, 2013) |
| (United States) Bryce Johnson | 2 (2025, 2026) |

== See also ==
- America's Strongest Woman
- Arnold Strongwoman Classic
- North America's Strongest Woman
- Rogue Invitational
- World's Strongest Woman
