= Karl Gillingham =

American strongman and powerlifter

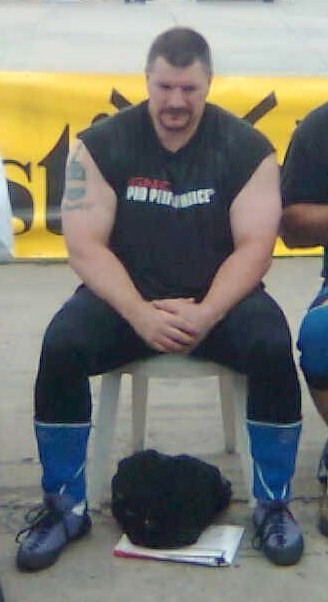
- Karl Gillingham

Personal information
- Born: Karl Gillingham; February 6, 1965 (age 61) Minneapolis, Minnesota, U.S.
- Occupation(s): Strongman, Powerlifting; Owner of Jackalsgym.com store
- Height: 6 ft 3 in (1.91 m)
- Spouse: Pamela Gillingham
- Children: Tyler, and Alex
- Relative(s): Gale Gillingham - father Brad Gillingham - brother Wade Gillingham - brother
Medal record
Strongman
Representing United States
World's Strongest Man
Qualified	2001 World's Strongest Man
Qualified	2002 World's Strongest Man
Qualified	2007 World's Strongest Man
Arnold Strongman Classic
8th	2005 Arnold Strongman Classic
9th	2007 Arnold Strongman Classic
All-American Strongman Challenge
1st	2007
IFSA Pan-American Championships
3rd	2005
Strongman Super Series
9th	2002 Hawaii Grand Prix
7th	2003 Hawaii Grand Prix
5th	2004 Sweden Grand Prix
6th	2006 Mohegan Sun Super Series
4th	2007 Venice Beach Super Series
6th	2007 Viking Power Challenge
6th	2008 Mohegan Sun Super Series
America's Strongest Man
1st	1998
3rd	2002
3rd	2004
North America's Strongest Man
2nd	2002
3rd	2011
Powerlifting
Representing United States
USAPL MN State Championships
1st	1993	125kg
1st	1994	125kg
1st	1995	125kg
1st	1996	125kg
1st	1997	125kg
1st	1998	125kg

Karl Gillingham (born February 6, 1965) is an American professional strongman and powerlifter.

== Strongman career ==
Karl has been competing in strongman since 1998 and has consistently been ranked in the top five nationally almost every year he has competed. Karl's first contest in strongman was the 1998 America's Strongest Man, which he won. Since that time Karl has traveled the world competing in over 70 top national and international contests including the prestigious World's Strongest Man contest, the IFSA Strongman World Championships, the Arnold Strongman Classic and the Strongman Super Series.

== Personal life ==
Karl is co-owner of Jackal's Gym in Marshall, Minnesota, an elite strength training gym and internet website along with brothers Brad and Wade.

Gillingham's father is Gale Gillingham, former guard for the Green Bay Packers in the National Football League. Karl is part of the "first family of strength" along with his father Gale, and brothers Wade and Brad Gillingham.

== Personal records ==
- Keg toss – 20 kg (44 lb) over 5.34 metres (17 ft 6 in) (2000 and 2001 Beauty and the Beast) [achieved twice]
- Atlas Stones – 6 stone set (IFSA high circle setup) (100–180 kg (220–397 lb)) in 74.63 seconds (2002 IFSA North American Strongman Championships) (World Record)

== Powerlifting ==
- Won MN State USAPL Championship 6 consecutive years: 93-98
- USAPL #1 Deadlift in Nation in 125 Kilo Class -'97

== Achievements ==
Professional Competitive Record - [1st (14),2nd (9),3rd (9) - Out of Total(75)]

Performance Metric - .870 [American - .884 International - .816]

Professional	1st	2nd	3rd	4th	5th	6th	7th	8th	9th	10th	INJ	DNQ	Total
American	14	7	7	6	2	6	1	3	4		1		51
International	1	2	2	2	4	5	2	1		1		4	24
Combined	15	9	9	8	6	11	3	4	4	1	1	4	75

- (Canada) North American Championship - Gatineau, Quebec - 5th place (2014))
- (Canada) Strongman Challenge - Dubreuilville, Ontario - 6th place (2013))
- (Canada) North American Championship - Gatineau, Quebec - 4th place (2013))
- (Canada) Festival Hommes Forts - Warwick, Quebec - 5th place (2013))
- (United States) Masters Americans Strongest Man - Kokomo, IN - 2nd place (2013))
- (Canada) North American Championship - Gatineau, Quebec - 7th place (2012))
- (United States) Sequim Irrigation Festival - Washington, USA - 2nd place (2012)
- (Canada) North American Championship - Gatineau, Quebec - 3rd place (2011))
- (United States) Liberty Classic Strongman - Philadelphia, Pennsylvania, USA - 6th place (2011)
- (Canada) Toronto Pro Expo - Toronto, Ontario - 7th place (2011)
- (United States) Strongman Showdown - Sequim Irrigation Festival, Washington, USA - 1st place (2011)
- (United States) USA vs Poland - Chicago, IL- 2nd place (2011)
- Santader Extremo Exhibition - Bucaramanga, Colombia - 1st place (2010)
- (Canada) North American Championship - Gatineau, Quebec - 5th place (2010)
- Bogota Tractomulous Exhibition - Bogota, Colombia - (2010)
- (United States) Marunde Invitational - Sequim Irrigation Festival, Washington, USA - 2nd place (2010)
- (United States) All American Strongman Challenge - Ironman FitExpo - Los Angeles, California, USA - 9th place (2010)
- (Canada) North American Championship - Gatineau, Quebec - 4th place (2009)
- Strongman Bogota Summerfest - Bogota, Colombia - 2nd place (2009)
- (United States) Liberty Classic Strongman - Philadelphia, Pennsylvania, USA - 4th place (2009)
- Summerfest Strongman Exhibition - Bogota, Colombia - 1st place (2008)
- Globes Strongest Man - Moscow Grand Prix - Moscow, Russia - 6th place (2008)
- (United States) Marunde Invitational - Sequim Irrigation Festival, Washington, USA - 4th place (2008)
- USA vs Poland - Lodz, Poland - 2nd place (2008)
- (United States) Mohegan Sun Super Series Grand Prix - Mohegan Sun Resort, Connecticut, USA - 6th place (2008)
- (United States) World's Strongest Man - Anaheim, California, USA - 5th in heat (2007)
- Viking Challenge Super Series Grand Prix - Norway - 6th place (2007)
- (United States) Venice Beach Super Series Grand Prix - Venice Beach, California, USA - 4th place (2007)
- (United States) Arnold's Strongest Man - Columbus, Ohio, USA - 9th place (2007)
- (United States) All American Strongman Challenge - Ironman FitExpo - Pasadena, California, USA - 1st place (2007)
- (United States) Xtreme Strongman Challenge - St. Louis, Missouri, USA - 2nd place (2006)
- (United States) Mohegan Sun Super Series Grand Prix - Mohegan Sun Resort, Connecticut, USA - 6th place (2006)
- (Canada) IFSA World Championship - Quebec City, Quebec - 12th place (2005)
- IFSA Pan American Championship - São Paulo, Brazil - 3rd place (2005)
- (United States) IFSA Arnold's Strongest Man - Columbus, Ohio, USA - 8th place (2005)
- IFSA Sweden Super Series Grand Prix - Gothenburg, Sweden - 5th place (2004)
- (United States) IFSA USA Nationals - Atlanta, Georgia, USA - 3rd place (2004)
- IFSA World's Strongest Team - Plock, Poland - 6th place (2004)
- (United States) Kasson Open - Kasson, Minnesota, USA - 1st place (2004)
- (United States) Children of the Corn Pro/Am Invitational - Northfield, MN USA - 1st place (2004)
- IFSA World Cup - Riga, Latvia - injured (2004)
- (United States) Strongest Man Alive - Willmington, Delaware, USA - 3rd place (2004)
- (United States) IFSA St. Louis Fitness Festival - St. Louis, Missouri, USA - 4th place (2004)
- (United States) IFSA Ventura Strongman Challenge - Ventura, California, USA - injured (2003)
- (United States) IFSA Las Vegas Strongman Challenge - Las Vegas, Nevada, USA - 4th place (2003)
- (United States) IFSA Northeast Strongman Challenge - Boston, Massachusetts, USA - 3rd place (2003)
- (United States) Children of the Corn Pro/Am Invitational - Iowa University, IA USA - 1st place (2003)
- (United States) IFSA Hawaii Super Series Grand Prix - Honolulu, Hawaii, USA - 7th place (2003)
- (United States) IFSA Hawaii Super Series 2002 Finals - Honolulu, Hawaii, USA - 9th place (2003)
- (United States) GNC Show of Strength - New Orleans, Louisiana, USA - 3rd place (2002)
- (United States) North American Championships - Shreveport, Louisiana, USA - 2nd place (2002)
- World's Strongest Man - Kuala Lumpur, Malaysia - 3rd in heat (2002)
- (United States) Kasson Open - Kasson, Minnesota, USA - 1st place (2002)
- (United States) IFSA USA Championships - St. Louis, Missouri, USA - 3rd place (2002)
- (United States) IFSA Ohio Valley Strongman Challenge - Athens, Ohio, USA - 5th place (2002)
- (United States) IFSA Midwest Strongman Challenge - Columbus, Ohio, USA - 5th place (2002)
- (United States) IFSA Northeast Strongman Challenge - Boston, Massachusetts, USA - 1st place (2002)
- (United States) Children of the Corn Pro/Am Invitational - Iowa University, IA USA - 1st place (2002)
- World's Strongest Man - Victoria Falls, Zambia - 4th in heat (2001)
- (United States) IFSA USA vs. World - St. Louis, Missouri, USA - 6th place (2001)
- (United States) NSAA Silicon Valley - Sunnyvale, California, USA - 3rd place (2001)
- NSAA Caribbean World Strongman - Dominican Republic - 6th place (2001)
- (United States) IFSA Hawaii Beauty & Beast - Honolulu, Hawaii, USA - 4th place (2001)
- (United States) Azeala Festival Pro Invitational - Norfolk, Virginia, USA - 2nd place (2001)
- (United States) Children of the Corn Pro/Am Invitational - Iowa University, IA USA - 1st place (2001)
- (United States) NSAA Strongman Tour - Kansas City, Missouri, USA - 1st place (2000)
- (United States) NSAA Strongman Tour - Holly, Michigan, USA - 1st place (2000)
- (United States) NSAA Strongman Tour - Shakoppee, Minnesota, USA - 1st place (2000)
- (United States) American Showdown - St. Louis, Missouri, USA - 8th place (2000)
- (United States) IFSA American Strongman Championship - Kokomo, Indiana, USA - 3rd place (2000)
- (United States) IFSA Hawaii Beauty and the Beast - Honolulu, Hawaii, USA - 6th place (2000)
- (United States) Strongman II - St. Louis, Missouri, USA - 8th place (1999)
- (United States) IFSA American Strongman Championship - Honolulu, Hawaii, USA - 6th place (1999)
- (United States) American Full Strength International Challenge - Las Vegas, Nevada, USA - 9th (1998)
- (United States) American Full Strength National Championship - Las Vegas, Nevada, USA - 1st place (1998)
