= Steve Kirit =

American strength athlete

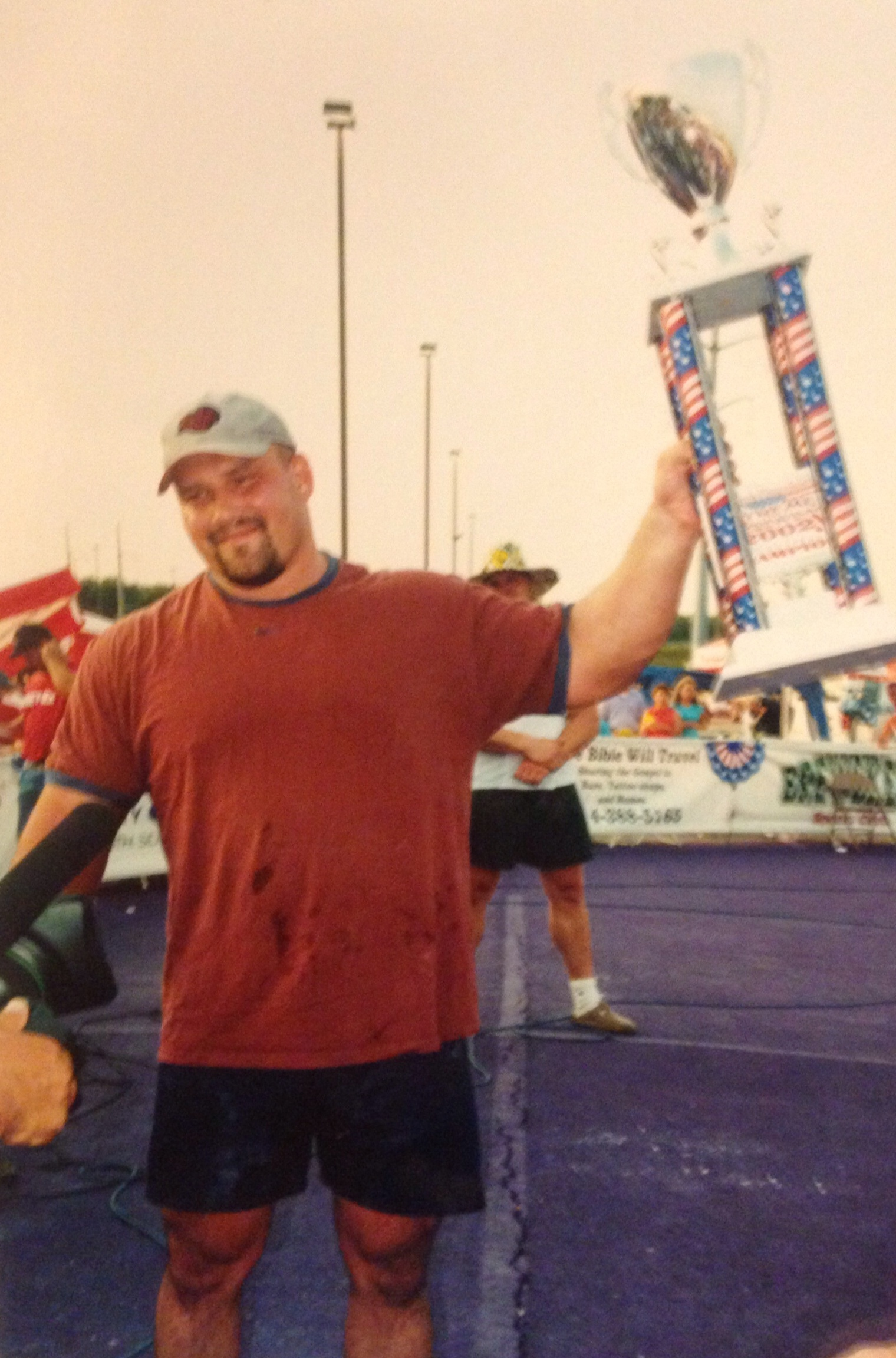
- Steve Kirit at the 2002 Nationals

Personal information
- Born: Steve Kirit; June 6, 1972 (age 54) (United States)
- Occupation: Strongman
- Height: 6 ft 2 in (1.88 m)
Medal record
Strongman
Representing United States
World's Strongest Man
Qualified	2002 World's Strongest Man
Qualified	2003 World's Strongest Man
Qualified	2004 World's Strongest Man
IFSA World Cup
7th	2004
IFSA Pan-American Championships
6th	2005
Arnold Strongman Classic
5th	2003 Arnold Strongman Classic
9th	2004 Arnold Strongman Classic
America's Strongest Man
1st	2002
1st	2003
4th	2004
All Strength World Team Championships
3rd	2004 Team USA w/Jon Andersen, Phil Pfister and Van Hatfield
GNC Show of Strength
1st	2002
St. Louis Sho-Me Pro-Am Championships
1st	2004
Pacifico Ford Strongest Man Alive Championship
1st	2004

Steve Kirit (born 1972) is a former American professional strongman competitor. Steve is a 2-time winner of America's Strongest Man.He competed twice in the Arnold Strongman Classic, finishing 5th in 2003 and 9th in 2004. Steve competed in the World's Strongest Man in 2002, 2003, and 2004. He narrowly missed the finals in 2003. Steve finished 7th in the first IFSA World Cup Championships in 2004, making the finals of eight men in a field of over fifty of the top competitors from around the world at the time. He had nine 1st place victories and five 2nd-place finishes as a pro, also finishing in the top five in the USA in three of the four U.S. Nationals he appeared in and was consistently ranked in the top 5 in the USA every year he was active as a pro. Steve retired from professional competition in 2006.

America's Strongest Man
Preceded by: Brian Schoonveld	First (2002–03)	Succeeded by: Van Hatfield
