= Mark Philippi =

American powerlifter and strongman (born 1963)

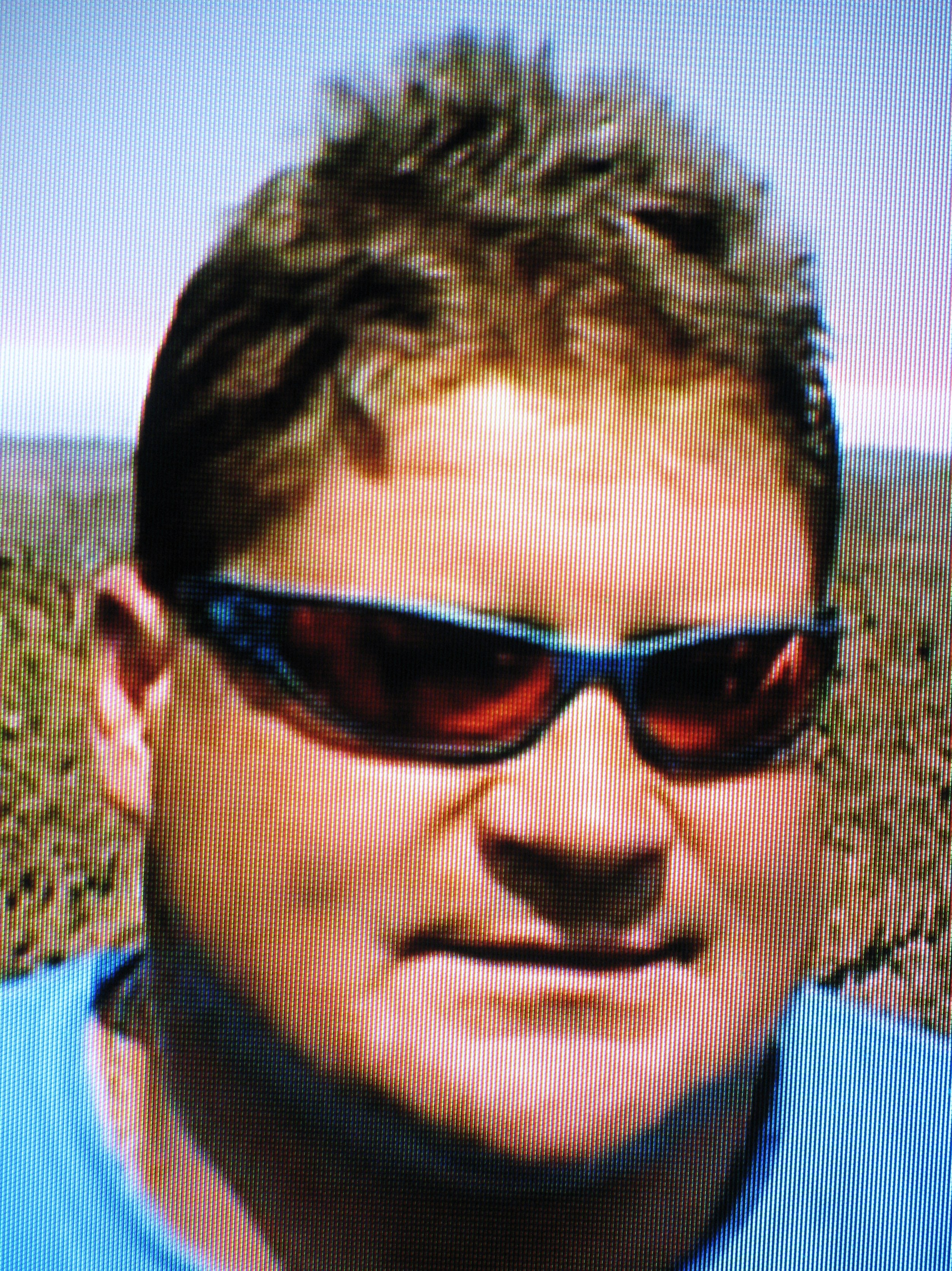

Personal information
- Born: March 21, 1963 (age 63) Menomonee Falls, Wisconsin United States
- Occupations: Strongman, Powerlifting
- Height: 6 ft 0 in (1.83 m)

Sport
- Position: Montana Tech (1983–1987) Offensive lineman; Chicago Bears (2025–present) Assistant strength and conditioning
Medal record
Strongman
Representing United States
World's Strongest Man
7th	1997 World's Strongest Man
8th	1998 World's Strongest Man
Qualified	1999 World's Strongest Man
Qualified	2000 World's Strongest Man
Qualified	2001 World's Strongest Man
Qualified	2003 World's Strongest Man
Qualified	2005 World's Strongest Man
Arnold Strongman Classic
4th	2002 Arnold Strongman Classic
4th	2004 Arnold Strongman Classic
4th	2005 Arnold Strongman Classic
World Muscle Power Championships
2nd	1997
3rd	1998
2nd	1999
World Strongman Challenge
2nd	1998
Beauty and the Beast
1st	1998
4th	2000
America's Strongest Man
1st	1997
3rd	2001
8th	2002
3rd	2003
All-American Strongman Challenge
4th	2006
Powerlifting
Representing United States
WDFPF World Powerlifting Championships
1st	1996	145kg

Mark Philippi (born March 21, 1963) is an American world champion powerlifter and strongman competitor who currently serves as the assistant strength and conditioning coach for the Chicago Bears of the National Football League (NFL). Philippi is a multiple entrant to the World's Strongest Man competition, and former holder of the America's Strongest Man title.

== Strongman and powerlifting ==
As a young man, Mark saw the early strongman competitions featuring his soon-to-be hero, Bill Kazmaier. He has stated that having seen Kazmaier on television he said to himself "I want to be like Bill." A career in athletic events focused on strength including powerlifting and strength athletics followed.

After winning the title of America's Strongest Man in 1997, he went on to represent his country in the 1997 World's Strongest Man finals, the first of seven appearances. He made the final on 2 occasions, but his greatest success came in the World Muscle Power Championships where he placed in the top three on three consecutive occasions from 1997 to 1999. His progress to become the best in the field was hindered by two major injuries that required extensive rehabilitation. In 1998, Philippi was severely injured at the 1998 World's Strongest Man during the car flip event where he ruptured his patella tendon and also partially tore his biceps tendon when the car rolled back on him. Surgery and a long rehabilitation followed but when he returned to strongman contests in 2000 he ruptured a patella tendon again. Philippi returned to competition in 2001 and placed third in the America’s Strongest Man contest.

As well as a successful career as a strongman, Mark was also a highly rated world champion powerlifter. He won the WDFPF World Drug Free Power Lifting Championships in 1996.

=== Personal records ===
- Deadlift (with straps) – 385 kg (849 lb) (2008 Madison Square Garden Grand Prix)
- Deadlift (without straps) – 372.5 kg (821 lb) (1996 ADFPA Men's Nationals)
- Squat (singly ply equipment) – 367.5 kg (810 lb) (1996 WDFPF World Powerlifting Championships)
- Bench press (singly ply equipment) – 245 kg (540 lb) (1996 ADFPA Men's Nationals)
- Log press – 170 kg (375 lb) (2004 Strongman Super Series Moscow Grand Prix)
- Keg Toss – 20 kg (44 lb) over 5.48 metres (18 ft 0 in) (2000 Beauty and the Beast)
- Crucifix hold – 12.5 kg (28 lb) for 79.80 seconds (1998 IFSA Grand Prix) (World Record)

=== Competition record ===
Strongman

- 1997
  - 1. - America’s Strongest Man 1997
  - 2. - World Muscle Power Classic
  - 7. - World's Strongest Man 1997, United States
- 1998
  - 1. - Beauty and the Beast
  - 3. - World Muscle Power Classic
  - 8. - World's Strongest Man 1998, (injured)
- 1999
  - 2. - World Muscle Power Classic
- 2001
  - 3. - America’s Strongest Man 2001
- 2002
  - 4. - Arnold Strongman Classic
  - 8. - America’s Strongest Man 2002
- 2003
  - 3. - America’s Strongest Man 2003
- 2004
  - 4. - Arnold Strongman Classic
  - 9. - Strongman Super Series 2004: Moscow
  - 6. - World's Strongest Team 2004
- 2005
  - 4. - Arnold Strongman Classic
- 2006
  - 4. - FitExpo Strongman 2006
  - 10. - Strongman Super Series 2006: Mohegan Sun
- 2007
  - 6. - Strongman Super Series 2007: Mohegan Sun
  - 5. - Strongman Super Series 2007: Venice Beach
  - 4. - North America's Strongest Man 2007
- 2008
  - 9. - Strongman Super Series 2008: New York

Powerlifting

- 1996
  - 1. - 1996 American Drug Free Powerlifting National Championships
  - 1. - 1996 World Drug Free Powerlifting Federation Championships

== Football ==
In College, Mark was an offensive lineman and three-year starter at Montana Tech from 1983 to 1987. In 2025, Mark became an assistant strength and conditioning coach for the Chicago Bears NFL franchise.

=== American football ===
- Offensive lineman and three-year starter at Montana Tech (1983–1987)
- Assistant strength and conditioning coach for Chicago Bears (2025–present)

=== Statistics ===
- Height 183 cm
- Weight 138–150 kg
- Arms 51 cm
- Chest 150 cm

== Personal life ==
Mark is married to Tracey with whom he has four children (Marc, born 1993, McKayla born 1998, Zach born 2001 and a fourth child born 2004).

=== Outside sports ===
Mark opened the Philippi Sports Institute Mark has written for, and been featured in, Men’s Health, Men’s Fitness, Muscle and Fitness, Sports Illustrated, Las Vegas Life, Ironmind and Powerlifting USA and written or appeared in articles in Sports Illustrated, Men’s Health, Men’s Fitness and the New York Daily News. In addition he lectures on Coaching, Motivation, Strength Training, and Conditioning. For a number of years he has also been an instructor and designer of the Academic Strength Curriculum at the University of Nevada, Las Vegas, Paradise, Nevada.
