= Jesse Marunde =

American strongman

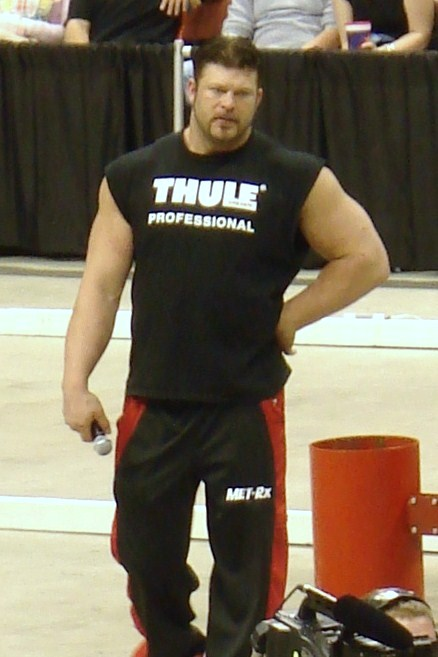

Personal information
- Born: September 14, 1979 Glennallen, Alaska
- Died: July 25, 2007 (aged 27)
- Occupation: Strongman
- Height: 6 ft 4 in (1.93 m)
- Spouse: Callie Marunde-Best
Medal record
Strongman
Representing United States
World's Strongest Man
Qualified	2002 World's Strongest Man
Qualified	2003 World's Strongest Man
2nd	2005 World's Strongest Man
Qualified	2006 World's Strongest Man
All-American Strongman Challenge
3rd	2005 All-American Strongman Challenge
2nd	2006 All-American Strongman Challenge
Strongman Super Series
2nd	2005 Venice Beach
3rd	2005 Poland
3rd	2005 Sweden
2nd	2005 Overall
2nd	2006 Mohegan Sun
3rd	2007 Venice Beach

Jesse Marunde (September 14, 1979 – July 25, 2007) was an American strongman athlete who placed second in the 2005 World's Strongest Man competition. He is the brother of mixed martial artist Bristol Marunde.

== Early life ==
Originally from Glennallen, Alaska, he later moved to Sequim, Washington. He was a high-school athlete, playing several sports, including Olympic lifting. He received an athletic scholarship to Montana State University, to play football. At age 18 he officially closed the No. 3 Captains of Crush Gripper, a hand gripper which requires 127 kg (280 lb)/ RGC 149 of pressure to close, and is the youngest person to achieve certified "Captain of Crush" status.

== Strongman ==
In 2002, at age 22, Marunde was the youngest American ever to qualify for the 2002 World's Strongest Man. His second-place finish in 2005 behind Mariusz Pudzianowski made him the first American to place in the top two competitors since O.D. Wilson finished second in 1990, behind Jón Páll Sigmarsson. Marunde is also the first person to shoulder the 186 kg (410 lb) Odd Haugen Tombstone.

== Death ==
On July 25, 2007 Marunde died following a workout in Sequim, Washington. The cause of his death was a genetic heart defect, hypertrophic cardiomyopathy, a leading cause of sudden cardiac death in young athletes. Jesse's widow Callie Marunde is now married to professional strongman competitor Nick Best.
