= Van Hatfield =

American strength athlete

- Born: Van Hatfield; September 13, 1971 (age 53); Mapleton, Utah United States
- Occupation: Strongman
- Height: 6 ft 2 in (1.88 m)
- Title: America's Strongest Man

Competition record

Strongman

Representing United States

Arnold Strongman Classic
7th	2005	
9th	2008	

IFSA Strongman World Championships
8th	2007	

IFSA Pan-American Championships
8th	2005	

IFSA Strongman World Team Championships
2nd	2005 Team Pan-America	

IFSA
2nd	2005 Holland Grand Prix	

America's Strongest Man
1st	2004	
2nd	2007	
3rd	2008	

World's Strongest Nation
3rd	2005	

Hawaii's Strongest Man
3rd	2004	

Powerlifting

Representing United States

USAPL National Powerlifting Championships
3rd	1999	+125kg
4th	2001	+125kg

Van Hatfield (born September 13, 1971) is an American professional strongman competitor and powerlifter from Mapleton, Utah. Van won America's Strongest Man in 2004, his career best win. Van came in 2nd at the IFSA Strongman World Team Championships in 2005 with team Pan-America with teammates Travis Ortmayer, Geoff Dolan and Jon Andersen. Van competed in the 2007 IFSA Strongman World Championships, finishing in eighth place.

America's Strongest Man
Preceded by: Steve Kirit	First (2004)	Succeeded by: Steve MacDonald
