= Raimonds Bergmanis =

Latvian weightlifter (born 1966)

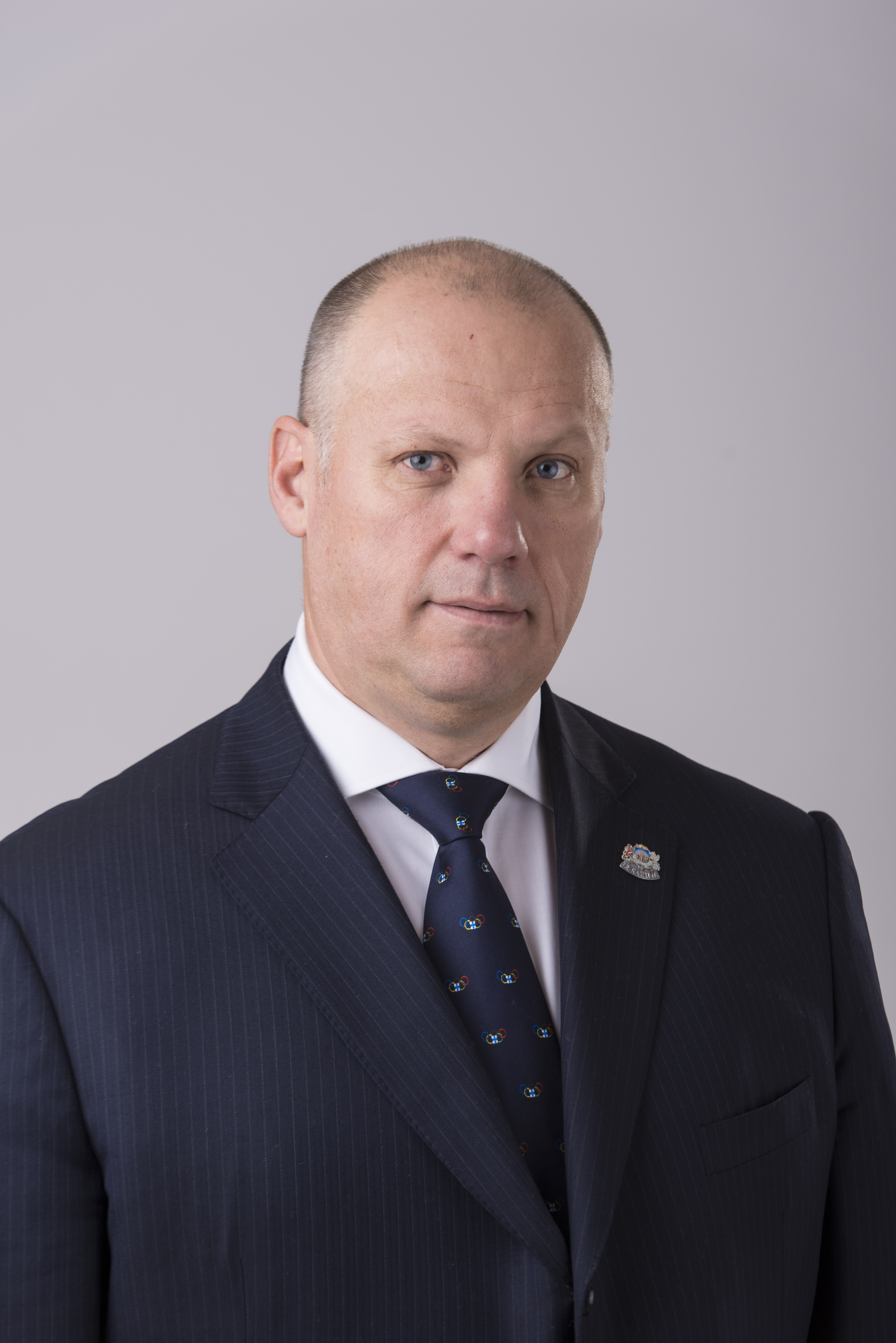

Minister of Defence
- In office 7 July 2015 – 23 January 2019
- Prime Minister: Laimdota Straujuma; Māris Kučinskis
- Preceded by: Raimonds Vējonis
- Succeeded by: Artis Pabriks

Personal details
- Born: 25 July 1966 (age 60) Pļaviņas, Latvia
- Party: Green Party

Competition record

Strongman

Representing Latvia

World's Strongest Man
7th	1996 World's Strongest Man
5th	1997 World's Strongest Man
Qualified	2001 World's Strongest Man
3rd	2002 World's Strongest Man
5th	2003 World's Strongest Man
4th	2004 World's Strongest Man

World Strongman Challenge
2nd	2003

Arnold Strongman Classic
5th	2002
3rd	2003
3rd	2004
8th	2006

IFSA Strongman World Championships
5th	2005

IFSA European Championships
4th	2005

World Muscle Power Championships
1st	1997
2nd	1998
2nd	1999

Representing Latvia

Men's Weightlifting

European Weightlifting Championships Total
Silver medal – second place	1997 Rijeka	+108 kg

Raimonds Bergmanis (born 25 July 1966) is a Latvian politician and former Minister of Defence. He is also a former Olympic weightlifter and Strongman.

== Athletic career ==
Bergmanis was part of the Latvian Olympic Weightlifting team, and set 21 Latvian records. He is a three-time Olympian (1992, 1996 and 2000). He placed 14th in the Super-Heavyweight (110+ kilograms) weight class in 1992, 9th in the Super-Heavyweight (108+ kilograms) weight class in 1996, and could not finish in the Super-Heavyweight (105+ kilograms) weight class in 2000. In 1992, he carried the Latvian flag at the opening ceremony, the first person to do so since 1936 when independent Latvia last participated in a Summer Olympiad. In 1997 European Weightlifting Championships he won silver in the Super-Heavyweight (108+ kilograms) weight class behind Tibor Stark with a career best performance.

Bergmanis had a successful strongman career and was known for his consistency across multiple disciplines, but never managed to win many events outright. He did, however, win the World Muscle Power Championships in 1997, and followed this up with two 2nd place finishes in 1998 and 1999. He also competed in the Arnold's Strongest Man Contest, his best result coming in the 2003 and 2004 competitions where he placed 3rd on both occasions. He also reached the finals in the World's Strongest Man contest several times, finishing 7th in 1996 and 5th in 1997. He competed in the 2001 contest, but was eliminated in the qualifying heats, before producing arguably the best performance of his entire strongman career in the 2002 WSM contest. In what was a hugely talented field, he found himself in 6th place after the first four events. However, by coming 3rd in the Asia Stone - breaking the old world record in the process - and then winning the last two events of the final - the Deadlift and the Atlas Stones - Bergmanis managed to overhaul a deficit to reigning champion Svend Karlsen and held off strong late charges from Juha-Matti Räsänen and Johnny Perry to finish 3rd overall. He then followed this performance by finishing 4th in 2003 and 2004, although the latter was a result of Mariusz Pudzianowski failing a drug test, meaning Bergmanis was promoted from 5th to 4th. He also produced strong showings in several Strongman Superseries events, including setting a new world record of 190 kg (419 lb) in the log lift at the Strongman Super Series Moscow Grand Prix.

=== Personal records ===
==== Weightlifting ====
- Snatch – 180 kg (397 lb) (1997 European Weightlifting Championships)
- Clean and jerk – 227.5 kg (502 lb) (1997 European Weightlifting Championships)
- Total – 407.5 kg (898 lb) (1997 European Weightlifting Championships)

==== Strongman ====
- Deadlift – 370 kg (816 lb) oil filled plates (2002 Arnold Strongman Classic)
- Log press – 190 kg (419 lb) (2004 Strongman Super Series Moscow Grand Prix) (former world record)
- Apollon's wheels – 166 kg (366 lb) x 2 power cleans and reps (2002 Arnold Strongman Classic)
- Hummer push – 3,629 kg (8,001 lb) for a 12m course in 17.07 seconds (2002 Arnold Strongman Classic) (World Record)

== Television career ==
After the end of his career, Bergmanis worked in Latvian television and presented a number of programs including "Happy Family" and "The Royal Jokes Tournament" and was commentator for the Latvian Strongman Championships. He was elected as a president of the Latvian Olympic club, and had previously been a board member and vice president. In March 2013, he was elected one of the vice presidents of the Latvian Olympic Committee.

== Political career ==
In 2013 he was elected as one of the vice presidents of the Latvian Olympic Committee. He has worked in the Latvian National Armed Forces.

Bergmanis is a member of the Latvian Green Party, part of the Union of Greens and Farmers political alliance. He was elected to the Latvian parliament in 2014. He became minister of defense in 2015 after his predecessor Raimonds Vējonis was elected President of Latvia.

== Honours ==
- Order of the Rising Sun, 2nd Class, Gold and Silver Star (2026)

Political offices
Preceded by Raimonds Vējonis	Minister of Defence; 2015–2019	Incumbent
