= Apollon (strongman) =

French strongman (1862–1928)

Louis Uni as 'Apollon the Mighty'. At his prime in 1890s, he was standing at about 188 centimetres (6 ft 2 in) tall, and weighing 118 kg (260 lb).

Apollon the Mighty (21 February 1862 – 18 October 1928), born Louis Uni, was a French strongman with a career spanning the late 19th and early 20th centuries, especially famous for his exceptional grip strength. Since his strength was so far above and beyond the ordinary during his time, he and his contemporary Louis Cyr were collectively called the 'Kings of Strength'.

== Biography ==
=== Early life ===
Louis Uni was born at eight o'clock in the morning on 21 February 1862, at no. 18 on the boulevard that today bears his name (Boulevard Louis Uni in Marsillargues) in the house his father Jean-Jacques Uni had built in 1845. He was the son of Jacques and Elisabeth (née Brémond) and was descended from a family of locally well-known giants. His grandfather Jacques Uni, born in 1772, was 203 centimetres (6 ft 8 in) tall, while the average male height in France in 1800 was only 163.7 centimetres (5 ft 4.4 in).

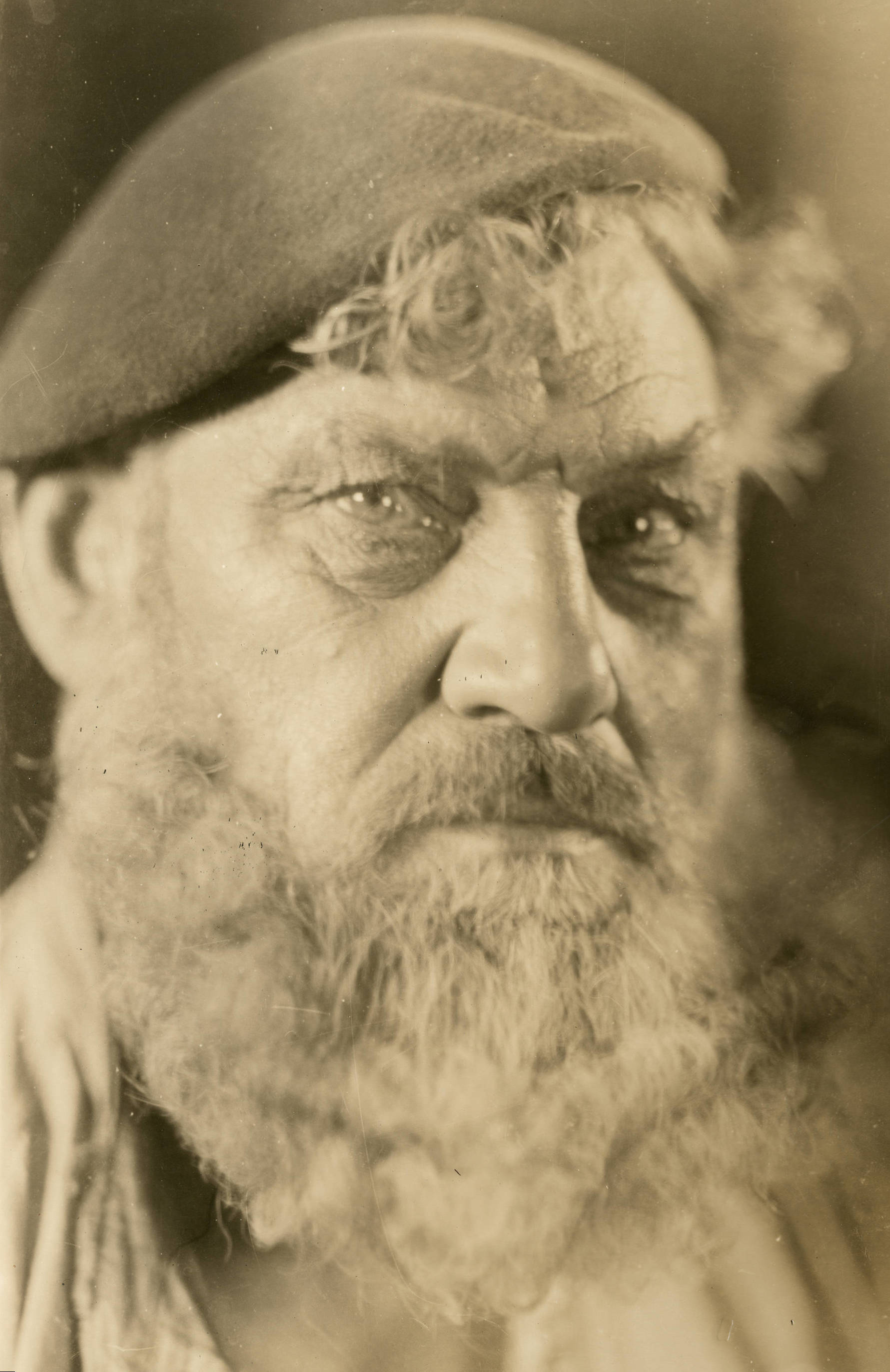
Actor Uni Apollon in 1926 at age 64, two years prior his death.

Aged 14 he ran away from his parents' house and joined the traveling Italian circus ‘Caramagne’ at Lunel near his home town. During a performance, the police seized him and returned him to his father. Eventually his parents allowed him to leave home and work with Felix Bernard and Pietro Dalmasso. He also worked with Henri Pechon and August "the Butcher". He completed his military service aged 20.

Uni took over the Café Fontaine in Paris, and after renovating it named it ‘Concert Apollon’ and began to put on theatrical programmes with athletic acts thrown in. Eventually, he had to relinquish the theatre, losing a considerable sum in the process. Uni was a friend and protégé of academic and champion of physical education Edmond Desbonnet.

=== Career as a wrestler and strongman ===
In 1889 Uni took part in a Greco-Roman wrestling competition at the International Athletic Arenas in Bordeaux:

‘This Tuesday evening... is the first representation of the competition of the French champions: Bernard, Crest, etc, and Apollon, the king of human strength... Finally, strength exercises will be performed by the celebrated Apollon, who has not yet met his equal, and has given himself the just title: the king of human strength. Apollon will lift his famous weight of 80 kilos to arm’s length... Apollon is truly the strongest man we have seen for a long time. In a pinch, between two fingers, he lifts a weight of 80 kilos. He is the most beautiful sample of an athlete that exists in the world. His perfect form and his face make one think of the gladiators of Roman antiquity.’

Also in 1889 Uni competed against Batta (Charles Estienne 1866-1939) in Lille using 118 kg (260 lb) train-car wheels (with an enormous axle which was much too thick even for the hands of Batta). Batta could only lift it to his shoulders, resting it lightly on his chest for a minute. Apollon was reported to have lifted the weight easily. Part of Uni's stage act was called ‘Escaping Prisoner’, during which he would bend the tempered iron bars of a cage through which he would then pass. He performed this routine at the Folies Bergère, among other venues. In December 1889 he appeared at the Royal Aquarium in London.

In about 1892 he married Josephine, with whom he had a daughter, but the marriage did not last, and after their divorce, she married Castanet, a famous animal trainer. On 18 December 1892, at the Théâtre des Variétésin Lille in France Uni cleaned and jerked a 155 kilogram double barbell, with two weighted globes on each end of the bar. He then found the balance point and neatly slid the barbell onto one hand while lifting one leg at a right angle. Then he let the barbell fall from overhead and caught it in the bend of his arms before placing it on the ground. In 1896 he was standing at about 6'3" and weighing 265 lbs, with 18" forearms and nearly 10" wrists.

=== Apollon's Axle and Apollon's Wheels ===
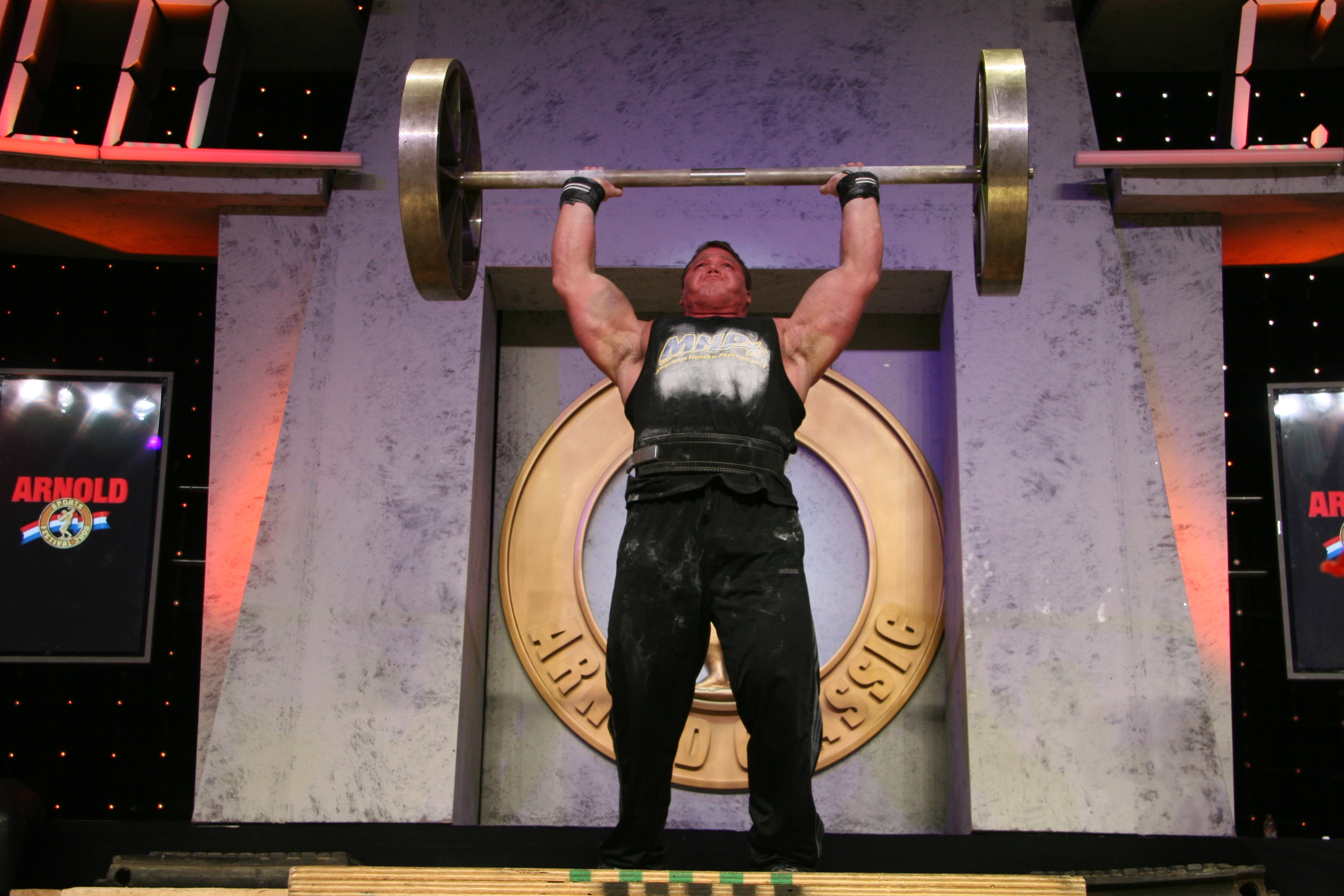
Derek Poundstone lifting the 166 kg (366 lb) replica Apollon's Wheels during 2008 Arnold Strongman Classic.

The single most iconic legend about Apollon is his 1892 custom-made thick barbell (now known as 'Apollon's Axle') which had a diameter of 1 11/12" (1.93" or 49.3mm), and the pair of 26 inch diameter railway car wheels (now known as 'Apollon's Wheels') fixed to it at the two ends. The entire contraption weighed 166 kg (366 lb).

Although popularly thought to be his main feat, there's no evidence to prove he ever cleaned, even less jerked or pressed it himself. The first men to have conclusively 'power clean' or 'continental clean' (Note: 'Power clean' involves pulling the bar all the way to the top of the upper chest at one go. In addition to grip strength, it also requires tremendous wrist strength to rotate the fixed implement as you clean it. The 'Continental clean' on the other hand allows the individual to rest the bar on the stomach which gives an opportunity to re-grip before finishing the clean.) and jerked it were Charles Rigoulot at Paris in 1930, John Davis at Paris in 1949, and Norbert Schemansky at Lille in 1954.

The implement is considered part of strongman history and remains a challenging lift due to several design features, including the nearly 2-inch diameter of the bar, its smooth surface, and the non-revolving wheels. The original implement is exhibited at the Musée National du Sport.

At the Arnold Strongman Classic, as advised by Terry Todd, the organizers replicated the historical implement and gave modern day athletes the opportunity to try the historic feat. From 2002 to 2009, 9 more men: Mark Henry, Mark Philippi, Svend Karlsen, Raimonds Bergmanis, Vasyl Virastyuk, Mikhail Koklyaev, Andrus Murumets, Benedikt Magnússon and Derek Poundstone managed to power clean and either press or jerk the 166 kg (366 lb) implement overhead. Additionally, 15 more men including Žydrūnas Savickas and Brian Siders managed to either press or jerk it following a continental clean.

=== Accident and later life ===
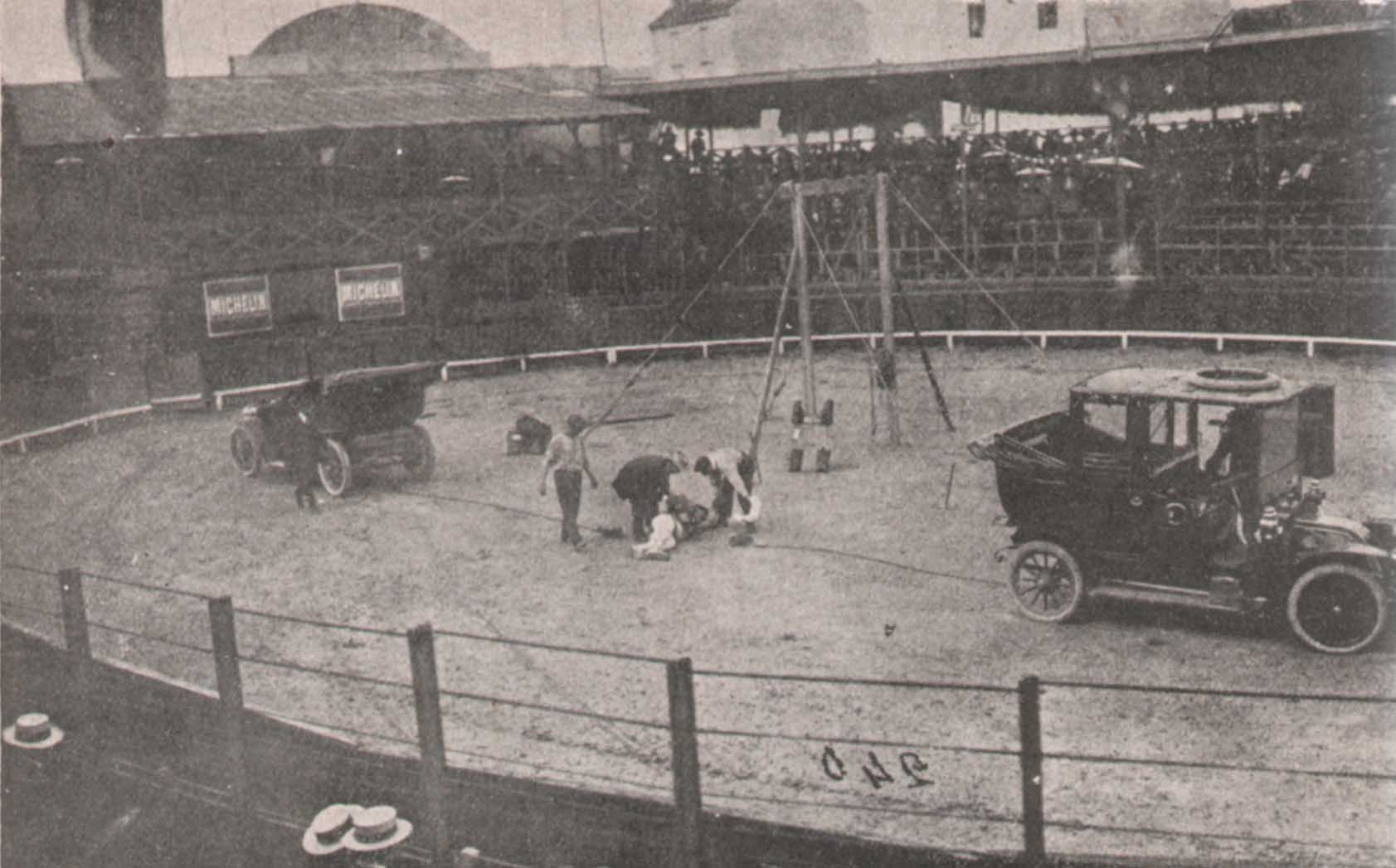
Apollon's accident while holding back two automobiles in Vichy.

In 1913, Uni met with a severe accident during a performance in Vichy in France. When attempting to hold back two motorcars with outstretched hands he cried out in pain and suddenly dropped to the ground, having torn the muscles of his arms and burst a blood vessel.

By 1923 he was looking for work as a 'right hand man' and appeared in the silent film Mare Nostrum (1926) cast in the role of "Triton". Even in to his sixties, he was still exhibiting his strength in traveling shows and vaudevilles.

He died in Evreux in 1928 aged 66.

== Legacy ==
The French Surrealist poet René Char, being a Southerner and a 1.92 m rugby player, was also an admirer of Louis Uni and addressed to him his famous poem "The Tomb of secrets" in Le Soleil des eaux (Le Tombeau des secrets).

In 1994, IronMind started mass producing their Apollon's Axle thick bar with a thickness of 2 in (51 mm). Later, Rogue also started manufacturing their own Apollon's Axle, replicating the exact thickness of the original 1892 bar at 1 11/12" (49.3mm).
