= Jason Kristal =

- Born: Jason Kristal; 1979 (age 45–46); United States
- Occupation: Strongman

Competition record

America's Strongest Man
1st	2008	

Jason Kristal (born on 1979) is an American weightlifter and professional strongman athlete who was placed first in 2008 America's Strongest Man.
