= Strongman Super Series =

Strongman competition series

World Strongman Super Series
- The official logo of World Strongman Super Series 2010
- Founded: 2001; 25 years ago
- Folded: 2010
- Last champion: (United States) Brian Shaw
- Tournament format: Multi-event competition

The Strongman Super Series, known from 2001 to 2004 as the IFSA World Strongman Super Series, from 2005 to 2008 as the World's Strongest Man Super Series, and reverting in 2009 to the World Strongman Super Series, is a sequence of grand prix events in the sport of strength athletics. It was introduced in 2001 in response to concerns that, unlike other individual sports such as golf or tennis, there was no recognized international "tour" in strength athletics. The Strongman Super Series ensures that there are a number of high-profile, professionally run contests during the year, with competitors' placings being used to decide the overall Super Series Champion.

Typically, ten to twelve athletes take part in each GP, comprising the top six in the international rankings and at least four qualifiers or wildcard entries. The winner of each grand prix receives ten series points, the second placed, nine, and so on. The highest scoring competitor at the end of the series is named World Champion.

World Class Events ("WCE") ran the Super Series in co-operation with the International Federation of Strength Athletes ("IFSA") from 2001 to 2004 until IFSA cut ties with WCE and World's Strongest Man and began promoting their own grand prix events and world championships. In 2005, WCE signed a deal with Trans World International ("TWI"), the world's largest independent producer and distributor of sports programming, to have the exclusive rights worldwide to be the only qualifying tour to the MET-Rx World's Strongest Man event for 2005–2008. The top four athletes from each Grand Prix competition receive an automatic invitation to WSM.

On April 27, 2009 Giants Live, an arena-based series of live strongman competitions, was named the Official World's Strongest Man Qualifying Tour for 2009–2011, thus taking over from the Strongman Super Series in this regard. The first 2009 qualifying event took place on May 17 at the Mohegan Sun Casino in Uncasville, Connecticut, and the second event being the Viking Power competition in Norway, and finishing off the 2009 season in Poland.

== Super Series World Champions ==
Year	Athlete	Nationality
2001	Magnus Samuelsson	Sweden
2002	Hugo Girard	Canada
2003/4	Mariusz Pudzianowski	Poland
2004	Žydrūnas Savickas	Lithuania
2005*	Mariusz Pudzianowski	Poland
2006*	Mariusz Pudzianowski	Poland
2007*	Mariusz Pudzianowski	Poland
2008*	Derek Poundstone	United States
2009	Brian Shaw	United States
2010	Brian Shaw	United States

*WSM Super Series

=== 2001 ===
The International Federation of Strength Athletes co-produced the Strongman Super Series events from 2001 to 2004 along with World Class Events (WCE)/Ulf Bengtsson.

The official logo of IFSA World Strongman Super Series from 2001 to 2004

Name and Location	Champion	Runner-up	3rd Place	Date
Netherlands Holland Grand Prix	(Netherlands) Wout Zijlstra	(Sweden) Magnus Samuelsson	(Norway) Svend Karlsen	20 May 2001
Prague, Czech Republic Czech Grand Prix	(Canada) Hugo Girard	(Norway) Svend Karlsen	(Sweden) Magnus Samuelsson	18 August 2001
Stockholm, Sweden Sweden Grand Prix	(Sweden) Magnus Samuelsson	(Canada) Hugo Girard	(Norway) Svend Karlsen	28 October 2001
Overall placings	(Sweden) Magnus Samuelsson (15 points)	(Canada) Hugo Girard (13 points)	(Norway) Svend Karlsen (13 points)	

=== 2002 ===
Name and Location	Champion	Runner-up	3rd Place	Date
Aberdeen, Scotland Scotland Grand Prix	(Norway) Svend Karlsen	(Canada) Hugo Girard	(Finland) Janne Virtanen	16 June 2002
Stockholm, Sweden Sweden Grand Prix	(Canada) Hugo Girard	(Norway) Svend Karlsen	(Lithuania) Žydrūnas Savickas	23 November 2002
Honolulu, Hawaii, United States Hawaii Grand Prix	(Canada) Hugo Girard	(Lithuania) Žydrūnas Savickas	(Poland) Mariusz Pudzianowski	17 January 2003 (Note: Although held in 2003 the 2002 Hawaii Grand Prix was the final event of the 2002 Strongman Super Series and was not a part of, and had no effect on, the 2003 series.)
Overall placings	(Canada) Hugo Girard (17 points)	(Norway) Svend Karlsen (13 points)	(Lithuania) Žydrūnas Savickas; 9 points)	

=== 2003 ===
Name and Location	Champion	Runner-up	3rd Place	Date
Honolulu, Hawaii, United States Hawaii Grand Prix	(Poland) Mariusz Pudzianowski	(Latvia) Raimonds Bergmanis	(Lithuania) Žydrūnas Savickas	18 January 2003
Silvolde, Netherlands Holland Grand Prix	(Poland) Mariusz Pudzianowski	(Lithuania) Žydrūnas Savickas	(Netherlands) Jarno Hams	14 June 2003
North Bay, Canada Canada Grand Prix	(Canada) Hugo Girard	(Poland) Mariusz Pudzianowski	(Norway) Svend Karlsen	1 August 2003
Imatra, Finland Finland Grand Prix	(Canada) Hugo Girard	(Poland) Mariusz Pudzianowski	(Latvia) Raimonds Bergmanis	16 August 2003
Columbus, Ohio, United States 2004 Arnold's Strongest Man	(Lithuania) Žydrūnas Savickas	(Norway) Svend Karlsen	(Latvia) Raimonds Bergmanis	5-6 March 2004 (Note: Although held in 2004 the 2004 Arnold's Strongest Man was the final event of the 2003 Strongman Super Series and was not a part of, and had no effect on, the 2004 series.)
Overall placings	(Poland) Mariusz Pudzianowski	(Lithuania) Žydrūnas Savickas	(Latvia) Raimonds Bergmanis	

=== 2004 ===
Name and Location	Champion	Runner-up	3rd Place	Date
Moscow, Russia Moscow Grand Prix	(Poland) Mariusz Pudzianowski	(Lithuania) Žydrūnas Savickas	(Ukraine) Vasyl Virastyuk	11 July 2004
Gothenburg, Sweden Sweden Grand Prix	(Sweden) Magnus Samuelsson	(Lithuania) Žydrūnas Savickas	(Norway) Svend Karlsen	5 December 2004
Overall placings	(Lithuania) Žydrūnas Savickas	(Ukraine) Vasyl Virastyuk	(Poland) Mariusz Pudzianowski/ (Sweden) Magnus Samuelsson	

=== 2005 ===
Beginning in 2005, WSM/WCE cut all ties with IFSA, who had begun promoting their own separate grand prix events and world championships. The Strongman Super Series then became known as the World's Strongest Man Super Series and was the official qualifying tour for World's Strongest Man from 2005 to 2008.

The official logo of World's Strongest Man Super Series from 2005 to 2008

Name and Location	Champion	Runner-up	3rd Place	Date
Los Angeles, California, United States Met-Rx Grand Prix	(Poland) Mariusz Pudzianowski	(United States) Jesse Marunde	(Finland) Janne Virtanen	18 June 2005
Malbork, Poland Nautilus Grand Prix	(Poland) Mariusz Pudzianowski	(Poland) Slawomir Toczek	(United States) Jesse Marunde	16 July 2005
Varberg, Sweden Vulkan Grand Prix	(Poland) Mariusz Pudzianowski	(Finland) Janne Virtanen	(United States) Jesse Marunde	30 July 2005
Uncansville, Connecticut, United States Mohegan Sun Grand Prix	(Poland) Mariusz Pudzianowski	(Canada) Jessen Paulin	(United States) Don Pope	10 August 2005
Overall placings	(Poland) Mariusz Pudzianowski	(United States) Jesse Marunde	(Finland) Janne Virtanen	

=== 2006 ===
Name and Location	Champion	Runner-up	3rd Place	Date
Uncansville, Connecticut, United States Mohegan Sun Grand Prix	(Poland) Mariusz Pudzianowski	(United States) Jesse Marunde	(United States) Josh Thigpen	1 June 2006
Moscow, Russia Moscow Grand Prix	(Poland) Mariusz Pudzianowski	(Russia) Elbrus Nigmatullin	(Canada) Jessen Paulin	2 July 2006
Milicz, Poland Poland Grand Prix	(Poland) Mariusz Pudzianowski	(Poland) Jarek Dymek	(Poland) Sebastian Wenta	12 August 2006
Overall placings	(Poland) Mariusz Pudzianowski			

=== 2007 ===
Name and Location	Champion	Runner-up	3rd Place	Date
Uncansville, Connecticut, United States Mohegan Sun Grand Prix	(Poland) Mariusz Pudzianowski	(United States) Kevin Nee	(United Kingdom) Mark Felix	22 April 2007
Los Angeles, California, United States Venice Beach Grand Prix	(United States) Dave Ostlund	(Poland) Mariusz Pudzianowski	(United States) Jesse Marunde	16 June 2007
Gol, Norway Viking Power Challenge	(Poland) Mariusz Pudzianowski	(Poland) Jarek Dymek	(Sweden) Magnus Samuelsson	7 July 2007
Overall placings	(Poland) Mariusz Pudzianowski			

=== 2008 ===
Name and Location	Champion	Runner-up	3rd Place	Date
Uncansville, Connecticut, United States Mohegan Sun Grand Prix	(United States) Derek Poundstone	(Poland) Mariusz Pudzianowski	(United Kingdom) Terry Hollands	19 January 2008
New York City, New York, United States Madison Square Garden Grand Prix	(United States) Travis Ortmayer	(United States) Derek Poundstone	(United States) Dave Ostlund	21 June 2008
Gol, Norway Viking Power Challenge	(Norway) Arild Haugen	(Poland) Sebastian Wenta	(Norway) Richard Skog	5 July 2008
Lysekil, Sweden Sweden Grand Prix	(Sweden) Magnus Samuelsson	(Estonia) Tarmo Mitt	(Norway) Richard Skog	16 August 2008
Overall placings	(United States) Derek Poundstone			

=== 2009 ===
Giants Live replaced the World's Strongest Man Super Series beginning in 2009 as the official qualifying tour for the World's Strongest Man. However, Strongman Super Series continued to hold events under the new title of World Strongman Super Series in 2009 & 2010.

Name and Location	Champion	Runner-up	3rd Place	Date
Bucharest, Romania Romania Grand Prix	(United States) Marshall White	(United States) Nick Best	(Sweden) Johannes Arsjo	4 July 2009
Los Angeles, California, United States Venice Beach Grand Prix	(United States) Brian Shaw	(Bulgaria) Stoyan Todorchev	(United States) Jason Bergmann	14 November 2009
Gothenburg, Sweden Sweden Grand Prix	(United States) Brian Shaw	(Bulgaria) Stoyan Todorchev	(United States) Jason Bergmann	5 December 2009
Overall placings	(United States) Brian Shaw (27 points)	(Bulgaria) Stoyan Todorchev (24 points)	(United States) Nick Best (21 points)	

=== 2010 ===
Name and Location	Champion	Runner-up	3rd Place	Date
Uncansville, Connecticut, United States Mohegan Sun Grand Prix	(United States) Derek Poundstone	(United States) Brian Shaw	(Bulgaria) Stoyan Todorchev	25 April 2010
Gol, Norway Viking Power Challenge	(United States) Brian Shaw	(Sweden) Johannes Arsjo	(United Kingdom) Laurence Shahlaei	26 June 2010
Lysekil, Sweden Sweden Grand Prix	(United States) Brian Shaw	(United States) Nick Best	(United Kingdom) Laurence Shahlaei	17 December 2010
Overall placings	(United States) Brian Shaw (33 points)	(United States) Dave Ostlund (19.5 points)	(United Kingdom) Laurence Shahlaei (16 points)	

== See also ==
- List of strongman competitions
- International Federation of Strength Athletes
- World's Strongest Man
- Giants Live
- Arnold Strongman Classic
- World Muscle Power Championships
