= Steve MacDonald (strongman) =

American strongman

- Born: June 6, 1969 (age 56); Pittsburgh, Pennsylvania
- Occupation: Strongman
- Height: 6 ft 2 in (1.88 m)

Competition record

Strongman

Representing United States

IFSA Strongman World Championships
Qualified	2006	

IFSA
3rd	2006 Finland Grand Prix	

Arnold Strongman Classic
8th	2007	

Strongman Champions League
3rd	2009 Germany	

America's Strongest Man
1st	2006	

Steve MacDonald (born 1969) is a strongman competitor from Pittsburgh. Steve has competed in the IFSA organization as well as the Arnold Strongman Classic. In 2007, Steve broke László Fekete's world record for the max. stone for weight at the 2007 Arnold Strongman Classic, lifting a 522 lb (237 kg) Atlas Stone over a 4 ft bar. Steve also won America's Strongest Man in 2006, his career best win.

== Personal Records ==
- Deadlift – 365 kg (805 lb)
- Bench Press – 256.5 kg (565 lb)
- Manhood Stone (Max Atlas Stone) – 237 kg (522 lb) over 4 ft bar (2007 Arnold Strongman Classic) (former world record)

America's Strongest Man
Preceded by: Van Hatfield	First (2006)	Succeeded by: Derek Poundstone
