= Odd Haugen =

Norwegian strongman

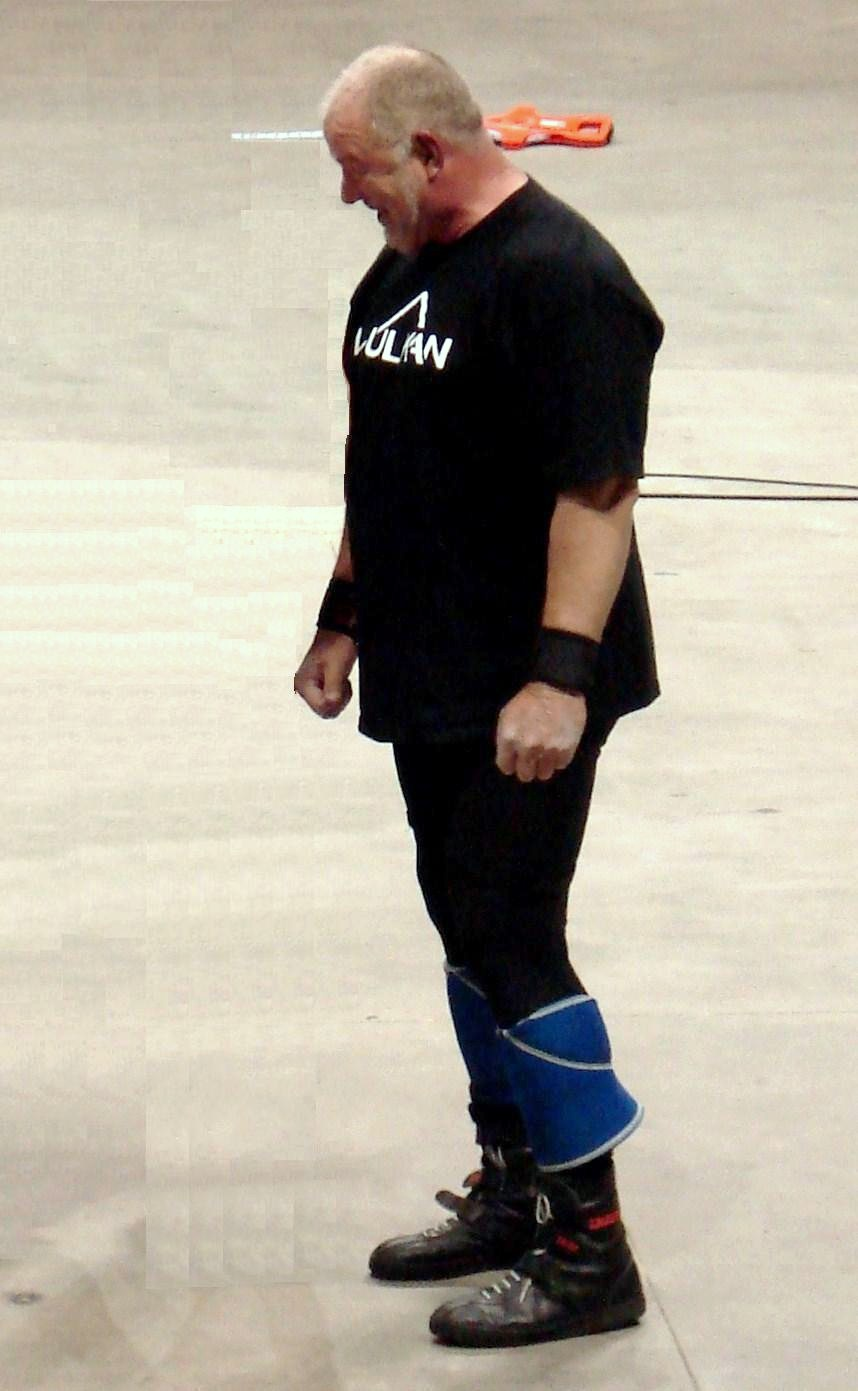
- Born: January 16, 1950 (age 76); Tingvoll Municipality, Norway
- Education: McDaniel College
- Occupation: Strongman
- Known for: Grip strength
- Height: 193 cm (6 ft 4 in)
- Website: https://www.oddehaugen.com/

Odd Erling Haugen (born January 16, 1950) is a Norwegian-born American strongman and a grip strength specialist. He has also competed in bodybuilding, weightlifting and powerlifting.

== Career ==
Haugen developed a passion for size and strength at a very young age. He used barbells and dumbbells made out of birch trees and took metal shop courses to gain knowledge on how to build strength training equipment. By 1970, Haugen became the Norwegian national bodybuilding champion by winning Mr. Norway title at the age of 20. Around this time, he also held the Norwegian junior deadlift record with 265 kg (584 lb). He then moved to the United States and earned a bachelor's degree in sports physiology and a master's degree in Business Administration. Haugen played football, wrestled, and threw shot put and discus at Western Maryland College (now McDaniel College). Haugen earned three NCAA All-American accolades in the shot put (1971, 1972, 1973). Shortly after graduating from Western Maryland in 1973, Haugen had a short stint in the National Football League. He was signed by the Washington Redskins and then the San Francisco 49ers. However, he played in preseason games only. In the 80s, Haugen invested in combining his interests in sport and business by opening health and fitness clubs in San Francisco, Berkeley, Oakland and Marin County. In the 90s he moved to Hawaii and continued with his sports business.

In 1995 and 1998 respectively, Haugen started his journeys in powerlifting and strongman. He squatted 280 kg (617 lb), deadlifted 320 kg (705 lb), won 1997 USPF Masters National Powerlifting Championship, won the 1999 AFSA Strongest Man in America, and podiumed twice in the America's Strongest Man and four-times in the Norway's Strongest Man. Even in his 50s, Haugen competed in the World's Strongest Man competition three times in 2001, 2002 and in 2006 set a record as competitions' oldest ever athlete at 56.

However, Haugen is most noteworthy for his exceptional grip strength.

== Feats of grip strength ==
- Millennium Dumbbell 104.5 kg (230 lb) – one hand lift [first man to achieve this feat] (joint-world record)
- Inch Dumbbell 78 kg (172 lb) – one hand lift (63 reps within 10 minutes) (World record) (Haugen has also done 65 reps with a slightly lighter 76 kg (168 lb) replica)
  - Both hands lift – (two dumbbells/ one per each hand) x 5 reps
- Extra thick grip Circus Dumbbell 81.7 kg (180 lb) – one hand lift (the diameter of the handle of this dumbbell is 3", which is 0 5/8" thicker than both millennium and inch dumbbells which has a thickness of 2 3/8" each)
- IronMind Rolling Thunder – 118 kg (260 lb) (Seniors record)
  - For reps – 100 kg (220 lb) x 17 reps (in 1 minute) (World record)
- Monster-Crush (3" rotating double handle) – 145 kg (320 lb)
- Country-Crush (2" rotating double handle) – 195 kg (430 lb) (former world record)
- IronMind Hub – 33 kg (73 lb) (Masters record)
- Grip Genie Block – 32.5 kg (72 lb) x 5 reps
- Pinch lift (both hands) – 82 kg (181 lb)
- Raw Deadlift – 332.5 kg (733 lb)
- IronMind Apollon's Axle double overhand deadlift – 210 kg (463 lb) (Masters record) (the thickness of this Axle is 2" (50.8mm))
  - For reps – 175 kg (386 lb) x 4 reps, behind the back – 200 kg (441 lb), with one hand – 105 kg (231 lb)
- Rogue Axle double overhand deadlift – 220 kg (485 lb) (Masters record) (the thickness of this Axle is 1 11/12" (49.3mm))
- Sorinex Saxon bar (rectangular bar) deadlift – 120 kg (265 lb) (Masters record)
- Snatch grip deadlift – 200 kg (441 lb)
- Napalm-Nightmare deadlift – 212.5 kg (468 lb) (World record)
- Suitcase grip (side handle) double barbell lift and hold – 105 kg (231 lb) per hand for 10 seconds (World record)
- Rogue replica Dinnie Stones 333 kg (734 lb) – Lifting the two stones weighing 187.3 kg (413 lb) and 145.6 kg (321 lb)

== Other ventures ==
Haugen is the President of Mas-wrestling USA and owns 'The Training Hall' sports club in Thousand Oaks, California where he often mentors his students, most notably 2019 World's Strongest Man Martins Licis.

He is also the owner of the 186 kg (410 lb) Odd Haugen's Tombstone, a natural stone which had been featured at the stone-to-shoulder strongman event of the Arnold Strongman Classic.
