= Nick Best =

American strength athlete

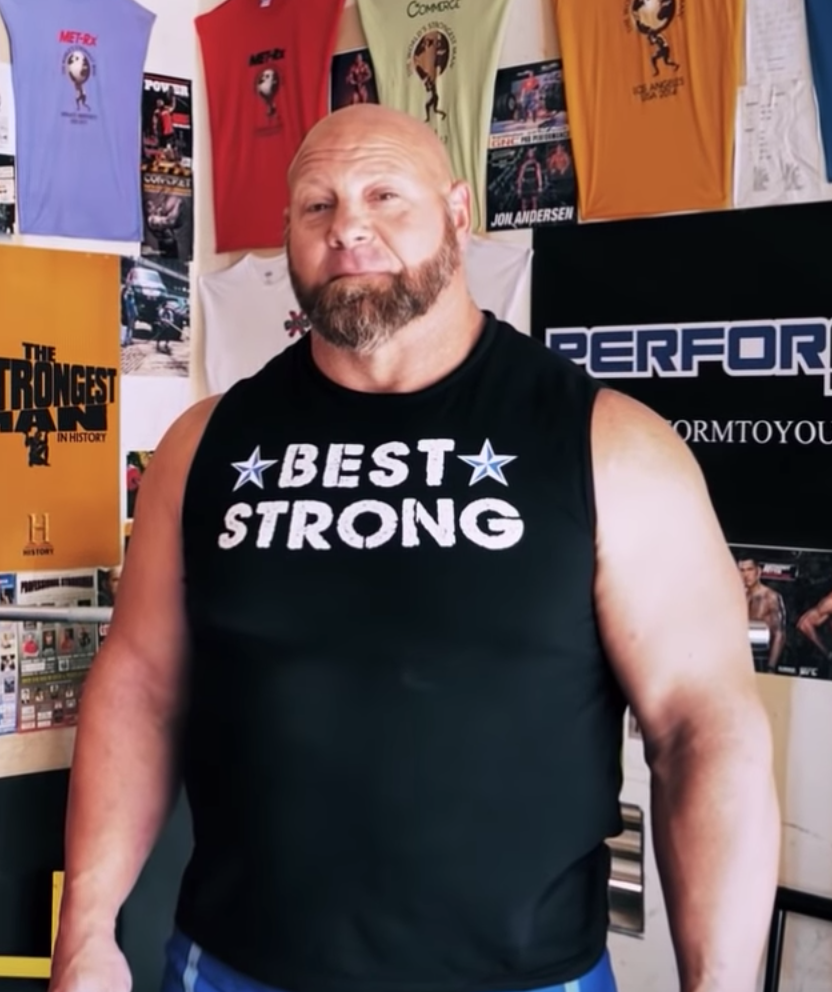
- Nick Best at his home in Las Vegas, Nevada

Personal information
- Born: Nick Best; November 6, 1968 (age 57) (United States) Las Vegas, Nevada
- Occupations: Strongman, power lifter
- Height: 6 ft 2 in (1.88 m)
- Weight: 320 lb (145 kg)
- Spouse: Callie Marunde-Best
- Children: Dylan Best, Jessica Best
- Website: nickbeststrongman.com
Medal record
Strongman
Representing United States
World's Strongest Man
6th	2010 World's Strongest Man
Qualified	2011 World's Strongest Man
Qualified	2012 World's Strongest Man
Qualified	2013 World's Strongest Man
Qualified	2014 World's Strongest Man
Qualified	2015 World's Strongest Man
Qualified	2016 World's Strongest Man
10th	2017 World's Strongest Man
Qualified	2018 World's Strongest Man
Qualified	2020 World's Strongest Man
Arnold Strongman Classic
9th	2010 Arnold Strongman Classic
7th	2011 Arnold Strongman Classic
Giants Live
2nd	2012 Australia
2nd	2013 Australia
SCL North American Championships
3rd	2012 SCL North American
Strongman Super Series
2nd	2009 Romania Grand Prix
4th	2009 Venice Beach Grand Prix
6th	2009 Sweden Grand Prix
3rd	2009 Overall
6th	2010 Mohegan Sun Grand Prix
2nd	2010 Sweden Grand Prix
4th	2010 Overall
America's Strongest Man
6th	2006 America's Strongest Man
3rd	2007 America's Strongest Man
4th	2008 America's Strongest Man
All-American Strongman Challenge
9th	2008
2nd	2009
1st	2010
2nd	2011
3rd	2012
Jesse Marunde Invitational
1st	2009

Nick Best
Medal record
Representing United States
Powerlifting
USAPL National Powerlifting Championships
1st	1996 USAPL National's	125kg
1st	1997 USAPL National's	125kg
3rd	1998 USAPL National's	125kg
WDFPF World Powerlifting Championships
1st	1996 WDFPF World's	125kg

Nick Best (born November 3, 1968) is an American strongman and powerlifter.

== Powerlifting ==
Prior to competing in strongman, Best won the USAPL National Powerlifting Championships in the 125 kg class in 1996 and 1997, as well as the WDFPF World Powerlifting Championships in 1996.

== Strongman ==
Best started his strongman career in 2006 by participating at America's Strongest Man competition. The following year he won second place to Derek Poundstone. In 2008, he carried the legendary Jón Páll Sigmarsson Stone for 28.24 metres (92 ft 8 in) for a new world record. In 2009 he participated at Strongman Super Series Romania Grand Prix and won second place in addition to winning Jesse Marunde Invitational.

In 2010, Best won the All-American Strongman Challenge which qualified him for the 2010 Arnold Strongman Classic where he finished ninth. Two months later he competed in the 2010 World's Strongest Man and qualified for the finals and finished sixth. On the same year Best finished second at the Strongman Super Series Swedish Grand Prix behind Brian Shaw.

In 2011, He placed second at the 2011 All-American Strongman Challenge which earned him an invite to the 2011 Arnold Strongman Classic, where he took seventh. He competed in the 2011 World's Strongest Man contest but failed to qualify for the finals.

In 2012, Best competed in the 2012 All-American Strongman Challenge and finished third. He placed second at the 2012 Giants Live Melbourne, Australia behind Mike Jenkins. In this competition, he set a joint world record in the hip lift event with Jenkins with a lift of 1,150 kg (2,535 lb). This placing qualified Nick for the 2012 World's Strongest Man contest, he finished third in his heat and failed to qualify for the finals. Also in 2012, he competed in the inaugural SCL North American Championships in Warwick, Ontario, winning third place.

In 2013, Best finished second in the Giants Live Australia Grand Prix behind Derek Poundstone. This placing qualified Nick for the 2013 World's Strongest Man contest. Despite qualifying for the World's Strongest Man competition in 2013, 2014, 2015 and 2016, he could not manage to get selected to the finals. However, in 2017 he did so where he emerged tenth. His attempts to get into the finals in 2018 and 2020 were unsuccessful.

In the 2019 television series, The Strongest Man in History, on the History channel, Best broke Paul Anderson's legendary Carousel lift world record by lifting 1,266 kg (2,791 lb).

Best is known for his longevity in the sport. He claims to have squatted 363 kg (800 lb) or more for 27 consecutive years.

== Personal records ==
- Deadlift – 380 kg (838 lb) (2017 World's Strongest Man)
- Hummer tyre Deadlift (15 inches off the floor) – 432 kg (952 lb) (2010 Arnold Strongman Classic)
- Elevated Axle bar Deadlift (for reps) (15 inches off the floor) – 340 kg (750 lb) x 12 reps (2009 Strongman Super Series Sweden Grand Prix) (World Record)
- Log press – 160 kg (353 lb) (2015 Britain's Strongest Man)
- Axle press – 171 kg (377 lb) (2009 Romania Grand Prix)
- Atlas Stone (for reps) – 205 kg (452 lb) x 4 reps over 4 ft bar (2011 Arnold Strongman Classic)
- Atlas Stone to shoulder – 147 kg (324 lb) x 7 reps (2013 Giants Live FitX Melbourne) (Joint-World Record)
- Jón Páll Sigmarsson Stone carry – 221 kg (487 lb) for 28.24 metres (92 ft 8 in) (2008 America's Strongest Man) (Former World Record)
- Elephant Shield carry – 200 kg (441 lb) for 71.33 metres (234 ft 0 in) (2017 World's Strongest Man - Group 5) (World Record)
- Farmer's Walk – 125 kg (276 lb) per each hand for 75 m in 47.56 seconds (2006 IFSA World Championships Group 1) (IFSA Record)
- Carousel lift – 1,266 kg (2,791 lb) (2019 Strongest Man in History TV show) (World Record)
- Hip lift – 1,150 kg (2,535 lb) (2012 Giants Live FitX Melbourne) (joint-world record)
- Super Yoke – 400 kg (882 lb) for 20 m in 8.88 seconds (2009 Romania Grand Prix)
- IronMind Rolling Thunder (V2) – 103 kg (227 lb) (2016 Visegrip Viking, Los Angeles)
- Double overhand Axle deadlift – 180 kg (397 lb) (2023 Fefor Arm Lifting)

== See also ==
- List of strongmen
- Strength athletics in the United States
