= David Ostlund =

American strongman competitor

Dave Ostlund
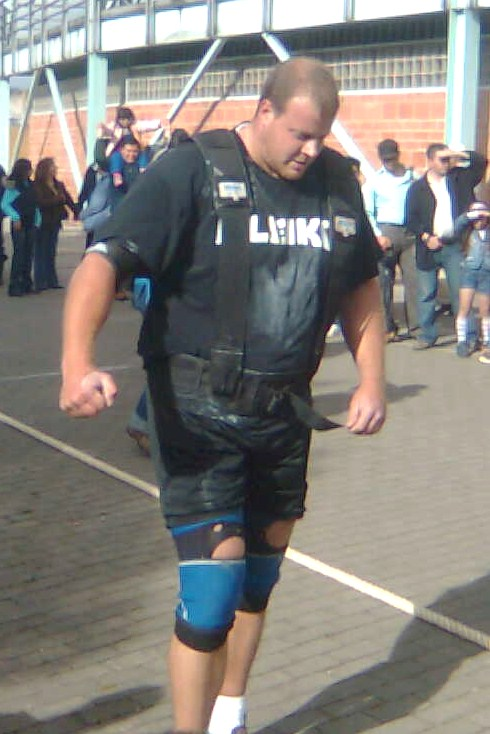

Personal information
- Born: May 7, 1981 (age 45) Edina, Minnesota
- Education: University of St. Thomas
- Height: 6 ft 7 in (2.01 m)
- Spouse: Kate Ostlund
- Children: William Thor Ostlund
- Website: www.minnesotastrongman.com
Medal record
Strongman
Representing United States
World's Strongest Man
9th	2005 World's Strongest Man
Qualified	2006 World's Strongest Man
6th	2007 World's Strongest Man
3rd	2008 World's Strongest Man
8th	2009 World's Strongest Man
Qualified	2010 World's Strongest Man
6th	2014 World's Strongest Man
Strongman Super Series
5th	2005 Venice Beach Super Series
8th	2005 Poland Super Series
6th	2005 Sweden Super Series
10th	2005 Mohegan Sun Super Series
7th	2006 Mohegan Sun Super Series
1st	2007 Venice Beach Super Series
9th	2008 Mohegan Sun Super Series
3rd	2008 Madison Square Garden Super Series
5th	2010 Swedish Grand Prix
2nd	2010 Overall
Arnold Strongman Classic
10th	2009
6th	2010
World Strongman Cup
1st	2004 Canada
9th	2004 Belarus
4th	2005 Canada
6th	2006 Russia
9th	2006 Latvia
6th	2006 Russia
4th	2007 Russia

David Ostlund (born May 7, 1981) is an American professional strongman competitor. He grew up in Edina, Minnesota and attended Edina High School. Ostlund was a member of the Edina track and field team and competed in the shot put and discus events. It was his weight training for track that initially sparked his interest in the sport of strongman.

Ostlund began training with rocks and tires in addition to his weight training and in May 2001, he entered his first strongman contest in Lac du Flambeau, Wisconsin. He was placed first and has been competing regularly ever since.

Ostlund attended the University of St. Thomas in St. Paul, Minnesota where he continued his weight and strongman training. He graduated in 2003 and worked for about a year as a real estate appraiser. In 2004, he won his pro card at The Strongest in the West contest in Eagle, Idaho. In October 2005, he married Kate Strachota, whom he met at college. They currently live in Edina, MN with their four kids.

== Personal records ==
- Odd Haugen tombstone carry – 186 kg (410 lb) for 25 metres in 28.10 seconds (2007 Strongman Super Series Venice Beach Grand Prix) (World Record)

== Achievements ==
COMPLETED CONTESTS

- (United States) Rochester's Strongest Man 2010- Rochester, MN, USA- 1st Place
- (United States) World's Strongest Man 2008 – Charleston, West Virginia, USA – 3rd place
- World Strongman Federation Grand Prix – Belarus – Silichy, Belarus – 5th place (8/3/2008)
- (United States) Madison Square Garden Super Series (World's Strongest Man Qualifier) – New York, New York, USA – 3rd place (6/21/2008)
- (United States) Hawaii's Strongest Man – Honolulu, Hawaii, USA – winner (2008)
- (United States) All American Challenge / Fit Expo (World's Strongest Man Super Series Qualifier) – Los Angeles, California, USA – 3rd place (2/17/2008)
- (United States) USA vs Poland – Poland – 2nd place (2008)
- (United States) Mohegan Sun Super Series (World's Strongest Man Qualifier) – Connecticut, USA – 9th place (2008)
- (United States) World's Strongest Man – Anaheim, California, USA – 6th place (2007)
- Altona Strongman – Manitoba, Canada – winner (2007)
- World Strongman Cup – Moscow, Russia – 4th place (2007)
- (United States) Venice Beach Super Series (World's Strongest Man Qualifier) – Venice Beach, California, USA – winner (2007)
- (United States) St. Patrick's Strongman (National Qualifier) – Columbia, South Carolina, USA – 2nd place (2007)
- (United States) Fit Expo – Pasadena, California, USA – 4th place (2007)
- World Strongman Cup – Podolsk, Russia – 6th place (2006)
- World's Strongest Man – Sanya, China – 4th place in Heat, DNQ for Final (2006)
- Altona Strongman – Manitoba, Canada – winner (2006)
- (United States) Utah's Strongest Man (USA National Championship Qualifier) – Utah, USA – 7th place (6/10/2006)
- (United States) Mohegan Sun Super Series (World's Strongest Man Qualifier) – Connecticut, USA – 7th place (2006)
- World Strongman Cup – Riga, Latvia – 9th place (2006)
- (United States) Iron Man Fit Expo Strongman Championship – Pasadena, California, USA – 3rd place (2/19/2006)
- World Strongman Cup – Khanty Mansisk, Russia – 5th place (2006)
- World's Strongest Man – Chengdu, China – 9th place (2005)
- World Strongman Cup – Ladysmith, Canada – 4th place (2005)
- (United States) Big Tony's Strongman – Wisconsin, USA – 2nd place (2005)
- (United States) Mohegan Sun Super Series (World's Strongest Man Qualifier) – Connecticut, USA – 10th place (2005)
- Sweden Super Series (World's Strongest Man Qualifier) – Varberg, Sweden – 6th place (2005)
- Poland Super Series (World's Strongest Man Qualifier) – Malbork, Poland – 8th place (2005)
- USSF Russia Grand Prix – Moscow, Russia – 7th place (2005)
- (United States) Venice Beach Super Series (World's Strongest Man Qualifier) – Venice Beach, California, USA – 5th place (2005)
- (United States) Strongest Man on Grand – St. Paul, Minnesota, USA – 2nd place (2005)
- World Strongman Cup – Minsk, Belarus – 9th place (2005)
- USSF Ukraine Grand Prix – Kyiv, Ukraine – 7th place (2005)
- (United States) Fit Expo – Pasadena, California, USA – 6th place (2005)
- (United States) Snowman Challenge – Illinois, USA 2nd place (2005)
- World Strongman Cup – Edmonton, Canada – winner (2004)
- Morden Strongman – Manitoba, Canada – winner (2004)
- (United States) Big Tony's Strongman – Wisconsin, USA – 4th place (2004)

Professional Competitive Record – [1st (6),2nd (5),3rd (3) – Out of Total(36)]

Performance Metric – .862 [American – .871 International – .854]

Professional	1st	2nd	3rd	4th	5th	6th	7th	8th	9th	10th	INJ	DNQ	Total
American	2	4	3	1	1	2	2		1	1			17
International	4	1		2	2	2	2	1	4	1		1	19
Combined	6	5	3	3	3	4	4	1	5	2		1	35

- (United States) Strongest in the West (NAS) (Amateur Platinum Plus Level Competition) – winner (2004) earned ASC Professional Strongman Card
- (United States) NAS Team Championships – Illinois, USA – winner (2004)
- (United States) Snowman Challenge – Illinois, USA – winner (2004)
- (United States) Monster's of the Midwest (Amateur Platinum Level Competition) – Missouri, USA – 4th place (12/6/2003)
- (United States) USA Amateur National Championship – HW Division (Amateur Platinum Level Competition) – Myrtle Beach, South Carolina, USA – 3rd place (2003)
- (United States) Heartland Challenge – Iowa, USA – winner (2003)
- (United States) Dino Day Challenge – Columbus, Ohio, USA – winner (2003)
- (United States) Stillwater's Strongest Man – Minnesota, USA – 2nd place (2003)
- (United States) Granite City Strongman – Minnesota, USA – winner (2003)
- (United States) West Virginia's Strongest Man – West Virginia, USA – winner (2003)
- (United States) North Dakota's Strongest Man – North Dakota, USA – winner (2003)
- (United States) Battle of the Badge – Minnesota, USA – winner (2003)
- (United States) Azalea Festival Strongman – Virginia, USA – 2nd place (2003)
- (United States) Northeast Strongman Showdown – Boston, Massachusetts, USA – 2nd place (2003)
- (United States) Broadripple Fitness Strongman Challenge – Indianapolis, USA – winner (2003)
- (United States) USA Amateur National Championship – HW Division (Amateur Platinum Level Competition) – St. Louis, Missouri, USA – 6th place (2002)
- (United States) Heartland Challenge – Iowa, USA – 3rd place (2002)
- (United States) Stillwater's Strongest Man – Minnesota, USA – 7th place (2002)
- (United States) Granite City Strongman – Minnesota, USA – winner (2002)
- (United States) South Dakota's Strongest Man – South Dakota, USA – 3rd place (2001
- (United States) A & K Strongman Challenge – Wisconsin, USA – winner (2001)

Amateur Competitive Record – [1st (12),2nd (3),3rd (3) – Out of Total(21)]
Performance Metric – .947

Amateur	1st	2nd	3rd	4th	5th	6th	7th	8th	9th	10th	11th	12th	Total
American	12	3	3	1		1	1						21
