= Faramarz Khodnegah =

Iranian former Strongman and Powerlifter (born 1965)

- Born: 1965 (age 59–60); Tehran, Iran
- Occupation(s): Powerlifter, Strongman

Faramarz Khodnegah (Persian: فرامرز خودنگاه; born 1965) is an Iranian former Strongman and Powerlifter. He currently is the official referee of Iran's Strongest Man since its first period.

Khodnegah was a weightlifter, but he had to leave this due to an injury.

Some strongmen like Mehrab Fatemi, the former champion of Iran's Strongest Man, and his older brother Mehdi Fatemi, claims that Khodnegah is not an athlete. Although they, together with Ali Esmaeili and Mojtaba Maleki, believe that he hasn't do a fair and neutral refereeing in recent Iran's Strongest Man competitions to make Rouhollah Dadashi win., Khodnegah denied it himself.

== See also ==
- Iran's Strongest Man
