= World Strongman Federation =

World Strongman International Union
- Formation: 2003
- Type: Sports federation
- Headquarters: Dubai, UAE
- Acting President: Vladislavs Redjkins (Latvia)
- Website: World Strongman

The "World Strongman" International Union of associations and clubs (old name World Strongman Federation - "WSF") ("WSM") is a worldwide organization within strength athletics, founded by Vlad Redkin, a prominent figure in the history of the International Federation of Strength Athletes and World Strongman Cup Federation. The WSF has organised a number of grand prix events and national championships featuring some of the world's leading strength athletes including 5 time World's Strongest Man winner Mariusz Pudzianowski, Brian Shaw, Mikhail Koklyaev, Krzysztof Radzikowski, Tarmo Mitt, Kevin Nee, Stefan Solvi Petursson, Laurence Shahlaei and Mark Felix. The WSF's flagship programme is the World Strongman Relays.

== History ==
The WSF was set up in 2003 by Vlad Redkin following a financial dispute with the World Strongman Cup Federation. Following Vlad's departure, the WSCF ceased to promote events and effectively disappeared from the strength athletics landscape. In September 2007 an event in Khanty-Mansijsk formerly affiliated to WSCF and featuring its athletes was promoted by Vlad Redkin. This event had its name changed at short notice from WSCF to the Grand Prix of Khanty-Mansijsk (Russia) and in effect was the first WSF event. The reason given after the competition by Redkin was that a combination of financial reasons as well as concerns over WSCF's stated aim of forming closer ties with the International Federation of Strength Athletes led him to part company with WSCF. He initially planned to cooperate closely with Strongman Super Series in 2008, but in fact set up a new federation called the World Strongman Federation.

In 2008 the WSF organised a World Cup, it featured Mariusz Pudzianowski amongst others. However, the inaugural season failed to attract as many top tier names as planned and the WSF World Cup season was reduced in scale. By the end of 2008 the new federation was organising one off grand prix events largely based in the countries of the former Soviet Union, featuring fields of athletes confined to those countries.

In 2011 the WSF began to exert its presence globally once more and a WSF Asian World Cup event was organised, with Tarmo Mitt winning the event and also featuring the comeback event for Kevin Nee who finished third.

In August 2011 Redkin stated that WSF had an agreement between 8 countries in that time and more were being approached in order to once again stage a WSF World Cup. This materialised and in August 2011 the 2011/12 World Cup was begun.

In August 2022 by the decision of the ExCo WSF organization has been rebranded to the "World Strongman" International Union of associations and clubs.

In September 2023, Mr. Vladimir Burdun (UAE) was legally elected by ExCo President of the International Union "World Strongman"

In August 2025, the WSM Executive Committee announced a leadership transition. Following an extraordinary session held on 5–6 August 2025, the Executive Committee stated that Vladimir Burdun had ceased to perform the duties of President. The committee decided to remove him from office and terminate his membership in the organisation, citing violations of the WSM Constitution and governance procedures. Vladislavs Redjkins, Secretary General of WSM, was appointed Acting President until new elections.

WSF World Cup
- 2012
- The official logo of World Strongman Federation

Tournament information
- Location: Varies
- Established: 2008
- Format: A number of Multi-event competitions within an annual tour

== World Cup ==
=== 2008 ===
Location	Champion	Runner-up	3rd place	Date
WSF World Cup Irkutsk Irkutsk, Russia	(Poland) Mariusz Pudzianowski	(Russia) Elbrus Nigmatullin	(Bulgaria) Stojan Todorchev	Feb. 22, 2008
Irkutsk Russian Strongman Cup Irkutsk, Russia	(Russia) Elbrus Nigmatullin	(Russia) Dmitry Kononets	(Russia) Michael Sidorychev	July 27, 2008

=== 2010 ===
Location	Champion	Runner-up	3rd place	Date
WSF BelAZ Strongman Cup Zhodzina, Belarus	(Estonia) Tarmo Mitt	(Lithuania) Atanas Abrutus	(Belarus) Alexander Lapirov	Sept. 24, 2010

=== 2011 ===
==== World Cup ====
Location	Champion	Runner-up	3rd place	Date
WSF Asian World Cup Uzbekistan	(Estonia) Tarmo Mitt	(Belarus) Alexander Lapirov	(United States) Kevin Nee	March 26, 2011
WSF World Cup stage I Riga, Latvia	(Lithuania) Atanas Abrutus	(Estonia) Tarmo Mitt	(Finland) Jarno Jokinen	Aug. 20, 2011
WSF World Cup stage II (Georgia (country)) Batumi, Georgia	(Georgia (country)) Zviad Kajaia	(Denmark) Nikolai Hansen	(Georgia (country)) Konstantine Janashia	Sept. 4, 2011
WSF World Cup stage III Minsk, Belarus	(Estonia) Tarmo Mitt	(Lithuania) Atanas Abrutus	(Ukraine) Oleksandr Lashyn	Sept. 10, 2011
WSF BelAZ Strongman Cup Zhodzina, Belarus	(Estonia) Tarmo Mitt	(Lithuania) Atanas Abrutus	(Belarus) Alexander Lapirov	Sept. 24, 2011

==== World Team Cup ====
Location	Champion	Runner-up	3rd place	Date
WSF World Team Cup: Stage I	(Ukraine) Ukraine; Oleksandr Lashyn; Sergey Konyushok	(Estonia) Estonia; Meelis Pungits; Peil	(Ukraine) Ukraine; Stahursky; Tishecky	July 2, 2011
WSF World Team Cup: Stage II	(Estonia) Estonia; Tarmo Mitt; Evgeny Shcherbakov	(Belarus) Belarus; Sergy Vachinshky; Alexander Lapirov	(Uzbekistan) Uzbekistan; Sergey Trubitsin; Hamza Primov	July 9, 2011

==== Other competitions ====
Location	Champion	Runner-up	3rd place	Date
Ukraine's Strongest Man 2011 Kiev, Ukraine	(Ukraine) Oleksandr Lashyn	(Ukraine) Victor Yurchenko	(Ukraine) Oleksander Pekanov	October 14, 2011
Hungary's Strongest Man 2011 Pusztaottlaka, Hungary	(Hungary) Zolt Szabó	(Hungary) Ákos Nagy	(Hungary) István Sárai	October 15, 2011

=== 2012 ===
==== World Cup ====
Location	Champion	Runner-up	3rd place	Date
WSF World Cup stage IV Tashkent, Uzbekistan	(Poland) Krzysztof Radzikowski	(Uzbekistan) Sergey Trubitsin	(United Kingdom) Mark Felix	March 30, 2012
WSF World Cup stage V Hoofddorp, Netherlands	(Netherlands) Richard van der Linden	(Sweden) Sebastian Davidsson	(Georgia (country)) Konstantinie Janashia	June 10, 2012
WSF World Cup stage VI Lviv, Ukraine	(Ukraine) Oleksandr Lashyn	(Ukraine) Viktor Yurchenko	(Iceland) Ari Gunarsson	July 14, 2012
WSF World Cup stage VII Lahti, Finland	(Denmark) Nikolai Hansen	(Lithuania) Antanas Abrutus	(Finland) Jarno Jokinen	Sept. 9, 2012
WSF World Cup stage VIII Denizli, Turkey	(Latvia) Rolands Gulbis	(Poland) Bartalomei Bak	(Estonia) Tarmo Mitt	Oct. 16, 2012

==== Other competitions ====
Location	Champion	Runner-up	3rd place	Date
Brazilian Strongman Open Championships Brazil	(Brazil) Eduardo Visciglia	(Brazil) Rodrigo Gigante	(Brazil) Rafael Crestani	Feb. 26, 2012
Azerbaijan Strongmen Championships Baku, Azerbaijan	(Azerbaijan) Vusal Mardanov	(Azerbaijan) Mehman Faradzov	(Azerbaijan) Hazrjad Magammedov	March 4, 2012
Russian Strongman Championships Krasnoyarsk, Russia	(Russia) Alexej Zolotuhin	(Russia) Vladimir Kalinichenko	(Russia) Alexander Lysenko	April 4, 2012
WSF Russian Strongman Cup Vologda, Russia	(Belarus) Alexander Lapirov	(Russia) Pavel Sprutsko	(Russia) Denis Naigibin	June 30, 2012
Elite Strongman: Moscow Moscow, Russia	(Poland) Krzysztof Radzikowski	(Bulgaria) Stojan Todorchev	(Russia) Mikhail Koklyaev	Aug. 1, 2012

==== World Team Cup/Team Championships ====
Location	Champion	Runner-up	3rd place	Date
WSF CIS/Baltic Team Championships	Team Russia (Russia); Elbrus Nigmatullin; Vladimir Muravlov	Team Ukraine (Ukraine); Oleksandr Lashyn; Ivanov	Baltic Team (Estonia) Tarmo Mitt (Lithuania) Antanas Abrutis	June 30, 2012

=== 2013 ===
==== World Cup ====
Location	Champion	Runner-up	3rd place	Date
WSF World Cup Stage I Tashkent, Uzbekistan	(Uzbekistan) Sergey Trubitsin	(Poland) Rafal Kobylarz	(Ukraine) Oleksandr Lashyn	April 14, 2013
WSF World Cup Stage II Aktau, Kazakhstan				April TBA, 2013
WSF World Cup Stage III Hungary				May TBA, 2013
WSF World Cup Stage IV Russia				May TBA, 2013
WSF World Cup Stage V Netherlands				June TBA, 2013
WSF World Cup Stage VI WSF European Championships (Poland)				June TBA, 2013
WFS World Cup Stage VII Portugal				July TBA, 2013
WSF World Cup Stage VIII Ukraine				Aug. TBA, 2013
WSF World Cup Stage IX Turkey				Sept. TBA, 2013
WSF World Cup Stage X Russia				Oct. TBA, 2013
WSF World Cup Finals WSF World Championships United Arab Emirates				Dec. TBA, 2013

==== World Team Cup ====
Location	Champion	Runner-up	3rd place	Date
WSF World Team Cup Poland VS. USA Poland				Aug. TBA, 2013

==== Other competitions ====
Location	Champion	Runner-up	3rd place	Date
Elite Strongman: Moscow Moscow, Russia				July TBA, 2013

== WSF World Strongmen Championships ==
=== 2012 ===
The first ever WSF World Strongmen Championship was held February 12–14, 2012 in Abu Dhabi under the patronage of His Highness Sheikh Hamdan Bin Mohammed Bin Hamdan Al Nahyan. The contest consisted of 25 athletes, after day 1 the field was cut down to 15 athletes, and down to 8 athletes after day 2. The scores were reset to zero after each day of competition, and the finals were held on Feb. 14, 2012.

==== Athletes ====
- Tarmo Mitt (Estonia)
- Mark Felix (UK)
- Laurence Shahlaei (UK)
- Josh Thigpen (USA)
- Richard van der Linden (Netherlands)
- Nikolai Hansen (Denmark)
- Elbrus Nigmatullin (Russia)
- Antanas Abrutis (Lithuania)
- Oleksandr Lashyn (Ukraina)
- Aleksandr Lapyrov (Belarus)
- Kevin Nee (USA)
- Juanjo Diaz Garcia (Spain)
- Sergey Trubitsin (Uzbekistan)
- Rolands Gulbis (Latvia)
- Krzysztof Radzikowski (Poland)
- Vusal Mardanov (Azerbaijan)
- Adam Darasz (Hungary)
- Vladimir Rizov (Bulgaria)
- Stefan Solvi Petursson (Iceland)
- Farzad Mousakhani (Iran)
- Mika Jaakola (Finland)
- Alexander Mantserov (Russia)
- Marc Wells (Australia)
- Gregor Stegnar (Slovenia)
- Ricardo Nortt (Brazil)

==== Day 1 results ====
Date: 12 February 2012 Dubai, UAE (United Arab Emirates)

Position	Name	Country	Points
1	Krzysztof Radzikowski	(Poland)	96
2	Farzad Mousakhani	(Iran)	94
3	Laurence Shahlaei	(United Kingdom)	84
4	Elbrus Nigmatulin	(Russia)	83
5	Alexander Mantserov	(Russia)	82
6	Oleksander Lashyn	(Ukraine)	81
7	Josh Thigpen	(United States)	79
8	Mark Felix	(United Kingdom)	76
9	Nikolai Hansen	(Denmark)	75
9	Stefan Solvi Petursson	(Iceland)	75
11	Tarmo Mitt	(Estonia)	73
11	Vladimir Rizov	(Bulgaria)	73
13	Antanas Abrutis	(Lithuania)	71
14	Rolands Gulbis	(Latvia)	66
15	Kevin Nee	(United States)	65

==== Day 2 results ====
Date: 13 February 2012 Dubai, UAE (United Arab Emirates)

Position	Name	Country	Points
1	Josh Thigpen	(United States)	52.5
2	Stefan Solvi Petursson	(Iceland)	51.5
3	Laurence Shahlaei	(United Kingdom)	47.5
4	Krzysztof Radzikowski	(Poland)	47
5	Mark Felix	(United Kingdom)	45
6	Farzad Mousakhani	(Iran)	42.5
7	Nikolai Hansen	(Denmark)	42.5
8	Antanas Abrutis	(Lithuania)	38

==== Day 3/Final placings ====
Date: 14 February 2012 Dubai, UAE (United Arab Emirates)

Position	Name	Country	Points
1	Krzysztof Radzikowski	(Poland)	35
2	Laurence Shahlaei	(United Kingdom)	33
3	Josh Thigpen	(United States)	27
4	Stefan Solvi Petursson	(Iceland)	22
5	Nikolai Hansen	(Denmark)	18
6	Kevin Nee	(United States)	15
7	Mark Felix	(United Kingdom)	12
8	Antanas Abrutis	(Lithuania)	0

=== 2013 ===
The 2013 WSF World Championships are scheduled to be held in December, and will also be the finals for the 2013 WSF World Cup. The contest is scheduled to take place in the United Arab Emirates.

== Grand Prix of Khanty-Mansijsk ==
Originally, another event in Khanty-Mansijsk in September 2007 was affiliated to WSMC and featured its athletes. However, the promoter of the event, Vlad Redkin, changed the name from WSMC to the Grand Prix of Khanty-Mansijsk (Russia). The reason given was that after the competition Redkin was parting company with WSMC due to his concerns over WSMC wanting closer ties with the International Federation of Strength Athletes. He also cited that he had lost money with WSMC. He initially planned to cooperate closely with the World Strongman Super Series in 2008, but in fact set up a new federation called the World Strongman Federation.

Date: 8 September 2007

Position	Name	Country	Points
1.	Stojan Todorchev	(Bulgaria)	49
2.	Tarmo Mitt	(Estonia)	47,5
3.	Elbrus Nigmatullin	(Russia)	42
4.	Raivis Vidzis	(Latvia)	36,5
5.	René Minkwitz	(Denmark)	33
6.	Brian Shaw	(United States)	30,5
7.	Christian Savoie	(Canada)	24
8.	Glenn Ross	(Northern Ireland)	20
9.	Mojtaba Maleki	(Iran)	17
10.	Karim Taleshi	(Iran)	17
11.	Igor Torlak	(Russia)	9,5

=== 2015 ===
The new President of WSF Pradeep Baba Madhok quotes “Our distinct target audience, apart from strength enthusiasts, that we aim to give utmost priority to is children and the youth, making them well informed on the importance of nutrition and fitness at a very young age. WSF solely stands by the principal of strength and with that in mind, we hope to inspire the forthcoming generations to reach their dreams.”

=== 2024 ===
Dubai World Strongman Championship

=== 2025 ===
Dubai World Strongman Championship

== See also ==
- World's Strongest Man
