= Dadashi =

Dadashi is a surname. Notable people with the surname include:

- Michael Dadashi, American entrepreneur
- Rouhollah Dadashi (1982–2011), Iranian powerlifter, bodybuilder and strongman
- Siamak Dadashi (born 1974), Iranian futsal player and coach
- Vali Dadashi (born 1981), Iranian politician and academic
