= Iran's Strongest Man =

Annual strongman competition in Iran

Tournament information
- Location: Iran
- Established: 1998; 28 years ago
- Number of tournaments: 16
- Format: Multi-event competition
- Hosts: Mohammadreza Fattah Hosseini; Reza Javdani; Javad Molania; Mohammad-Amin Nabiollahi; Aliram Nouraee; Aidin Khataei
- Broadcast: IRIB TV3

Current champion
- Ramin Farajnejhad

Most recent tournament
- 2026 Iran's Strongest Man

Iran's Strongest Man (Persian: قوی‌ترین مرد ایران), also called Mardān-e Āhanin; Persian: مردان آهنین), is the only televised annual strongman event in Iran, airs on Channel 3.

Mohammadreza Fattah Hosseini, Reza Javdani, and Mohammad-Amin Nabiollahi have been the hosts of programme so far. Faramarz Khodnegah is the official referee, assisted at times by Mehdi Fatemi (2005–2006), Mehrab Fatemi (2007–2009), and Ali Dadashi (2010). After six years of absence, the 12th edition of the event took place on Nowruz 2018.

== Final results ==
Year	Place	Winner	Runner-up	Third	Fourth	Fifth	Sixth	Seventh	Eighth
1998	Tehran	Mehrab Fatemi	Hamid Soltan	Mehdi Mirdavoudi	Mehdi Fatemi	Farhad Panahi	Akbar Ghamgin	—N/a	—N/a
2001	Boroujerd	Mehrab Fatemi	Mojtaba Maleki	Majid Talkhabi	Mehdi Fatemi	Ali Dadashi	Reza Golmohammadi	Hossein Fatemi	Hossein Bejani
2004	Tehran	Reza Gharaei	Mojtaba Maleki	Rouhollah Dadashi	Amir Gharaei	Mehdi Mirdavoudi	Majid Dejbarar	Mehdi Bagheri	Mehdi Pashaei
2005	Kish	Mehrab Fatemi	Mojtaba Maleki	Hossein Fatemi	Majid Talkhabi	Karim Taleshi	Mehdi Bagheri	Ali Esmaeili	M. Mohammadi
2006	Bandar Abbas	Mehrab Fatemi	Ali Esmaeili	Hossein Fatemi	Aidin Khataei	Hamid Gharaei	M. Mohammadi	—N/a	—N/a
2007	Bam	Reza Gharaei	Farzad Mousakhani	Ali Esmaeili	Rouhollah Dadashi	Hamid Gharaei	M. Mohammadi	—N/a	—N/a
2008	Chabahar	Reza Gharaei	Hassan Ebadi	Rouhollah Dadashi	Ali Esmaeili	M. Mohammadi	Hamid Gharaei	Amir Gharaei	Javad Maafi
2009	Bam	Rouhollah Dadashi	Moslem Darabi	Ali Esmaeili	M. Mohammadi	Mehrdad Bajelan	Hamed Amiri	Hamid Gharaei	Mehdi Norouzi
2010	Tehran	Rouhollah Dadashi	Moslem Darabi	Mehrdad Bajelan	M. Mohammadi	Mohsen Akhoundi	Alireza Gharaei	Mehrab Fatemi	Ali Esmaeili
2011	Gheshm	Moslem Darabi	Ali Esmaeili	Kamal Sharifi	Karim Taleshi	Nemat Jalali	Mohsen Akhoundi	Saeed B. Kazemi	—N/a
2012	Kish	Moslem Darabi	Nemat Jalali	Hamed Haghzareh	Mohsen Masnabadi	Mehrdad Bajelan	Bahram Akbari	Farshid Hemmati	—N/a
2018	Tehran	Mohammad Ezzatpour	Peiman Maheripour	Mohsen Masnabadi	Mohammadreza Tazeroo	Ali Nokani	Sirvan Soleymani	Hassan H. Aghaei	Faramarz Rahmani
2024	Kish	Reza Gheitasi	AliAkbar Jafari	Ali Fazeli	Mohammadreza Tazeroo	Amir Sohrabi	Malek Jafari	Milad AbbasAbadi	Mohsen Masnabadi
2025	Kish	Reza Gheitasi	Ali Fazeli	Malek Jafari	Mohammadreza Tazeroo	Hossein Hosseinzadeh	Behrouz Iranshahi	Hosein Vakili	Sajjad Soltani nejhad
2025	Kish	Ramin Farajnejhad	Reza Gheitasi	Mohammadreza Tazeroo	Malek Jafari	AliAkbar Jafari	Aref Ahmadi	Vahid Rustami	Milad AbbasAbadi
2026	Kish	Ramin Farajnejhad	Ali Fazeli	Reza Gheitasi	AliAkbar Jafari	Mohammad Sadeghi	Mohammad Parsa	Faramarz Rahmani	Sajjad Soltani nejhad

== Fair-play award winner ==
Year	Place	Fair-play Winner
1998	Tehran	Kazem Sad
2001	Boroujerd	Mansour Rostamzadeh
2004	Tehran	Ahmed Afshar
2005	Kish	Rahim Asgari and Mehdi Bagheri
2006	Bandar Abbas	Ali Dadashi and Siavash Barfan
2007	Bam	Mehdi Bagheri
2008	Chabahar	Kamal Sharifi
2009	Bam	Hasan Aliyar and Siavash Barfan
2010	Tehran	Ghiyath Ahmadi and Hossein Rasouli
2011	Qeshm	Amirhossein Yavari
2012	Kish	Nemat Jalali
2018	Tehran	N/A
2024	Kish	Reza Gheitasi / Ahmad Reza Masnabadi
2025	Kish	Matin Ali Mohammadi
2025	Kish	Valiyollah Ezzatpour

== Records ==
- Most championship:

Mehrab Fatemi (4 times)
Reza Gharaei (3 times)

- Most second place:

Mojtaba Maleki (3 times)
Ali Esmaeili and Moslem Darabi and Ali Fazeli (2 times)

- Most third place:

Rouhollah Dadashi, Ali Esmaeili and Hossein Fatemi (2 times)

- Most appearances in the finals:

Ali Esmaeili (7 times)
Mohammad Mohammadi (6 times)
Mehrab Fatemi and Rouhollah Dadashi (5 times)

- Most consecutive championships:

Mehrab Fatemi, Reza Gharaei, Rouhollah Dadashi , Moslem Darabi and Reza Gheitasi and Ramin Farajnejhad (2 times)

== See also ==
- Aidin Khataei
