= Rouhollah Dadashi =

Iranian athlete

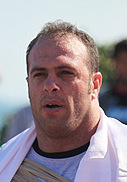
- Dadashi in 2011
- Born: January 24, 1982; Mianeh, East Azerbaijan, Iran
- Died: July 16, 2011 (aged 29); Karaj, Iran
- Occupation: Strongman
- Height: 1.88 m (6 ft 2 in)

Competition record

Iran's Strongest Man
| 3rd | 2004 | |
| 4th | 2007 | |
| 3rd | 2008 | |
| 1st | 2009 | |
| 1st | 2010 | |

Rouhollah Dadashi (Persian: روح‌الله داداشی; January 24, 1982 – July 16, 2011) was an Iranian powerlifter, bodybuilder and strongman, competing for Iran in international strongman competitions.

He participated five times in Iran's Strongest Man competition, reaching the final round each time, and becoming the champion twice (2009 and 2010).

Dadashi was stabbed and killed on 16 July 2011, 11:45 p.m in a fight which started as an argument with another driver and his passengers. On 17 July 2011, two of the killers were arrested by the police in the city of Karaj. The third and main murderer was arrested the next day while trying to escape the city.

Thousands of people attended Dadashi's burial ceremony. He was buried in Imamzadeh Mohammad in Karaj on 18 July 2011.

== See also ==
- Iran's Strongest Man
- World Strongman Cup Federation

Awards
| Preceded by Reza Gharaei | Iran's Strongest Man; 2009, 2010 | Succeeded by Moslem Darabi |
