= Jarno Jokinen =

Finnish strongman

Personal information
- Occupation: Strongman
- Height: 6 ft 4 in (1.93 m)
Medal record
Strongman
Representing Finland
World Strongman Federation
3rd	2011 WSF World Cup Latvia
3rd	2012 WSF World Cup Finland
King of the Castle
7th	2012 King of the Castle
Strongman Champions League
10th	2012 SCL Lapland
World's Strongest Team
1st	2012 World's Strongest Team with Hafþór Júlíus Björnsson
Finland's Strongest Man
1st	2011

Jarno Antero Jokinen is a competitive Strongman from Finland.

He won Finland's Strongest Man in 2011 and emerged third place in 2011 WSF World Cup Latvia and third place in 2012 WSF World Cup Finland.

Jokinen competed in the Ultimate Strongman World's Strongest Team 2012 together with Hafþór Júlíus Björnsson and won 1st place. Their team was called 'The Vikings'. Baltic Barbarians (Tarmo Mitt and Markus Männik) placed second while Saxons (Eddie Hall and Simon Flint) placed third.

== Personal records ==
- Deadlift - 350 kg x 2 reps
- Conan's wheel - 270 kg for 32.90 m
- Frame walk - 380 kg for 25 meters in 16.89 sec
- Front hold - 25 kg for 22.59 sec
