= Kevin Nee =

American professional Strongman athlete (born 1985)

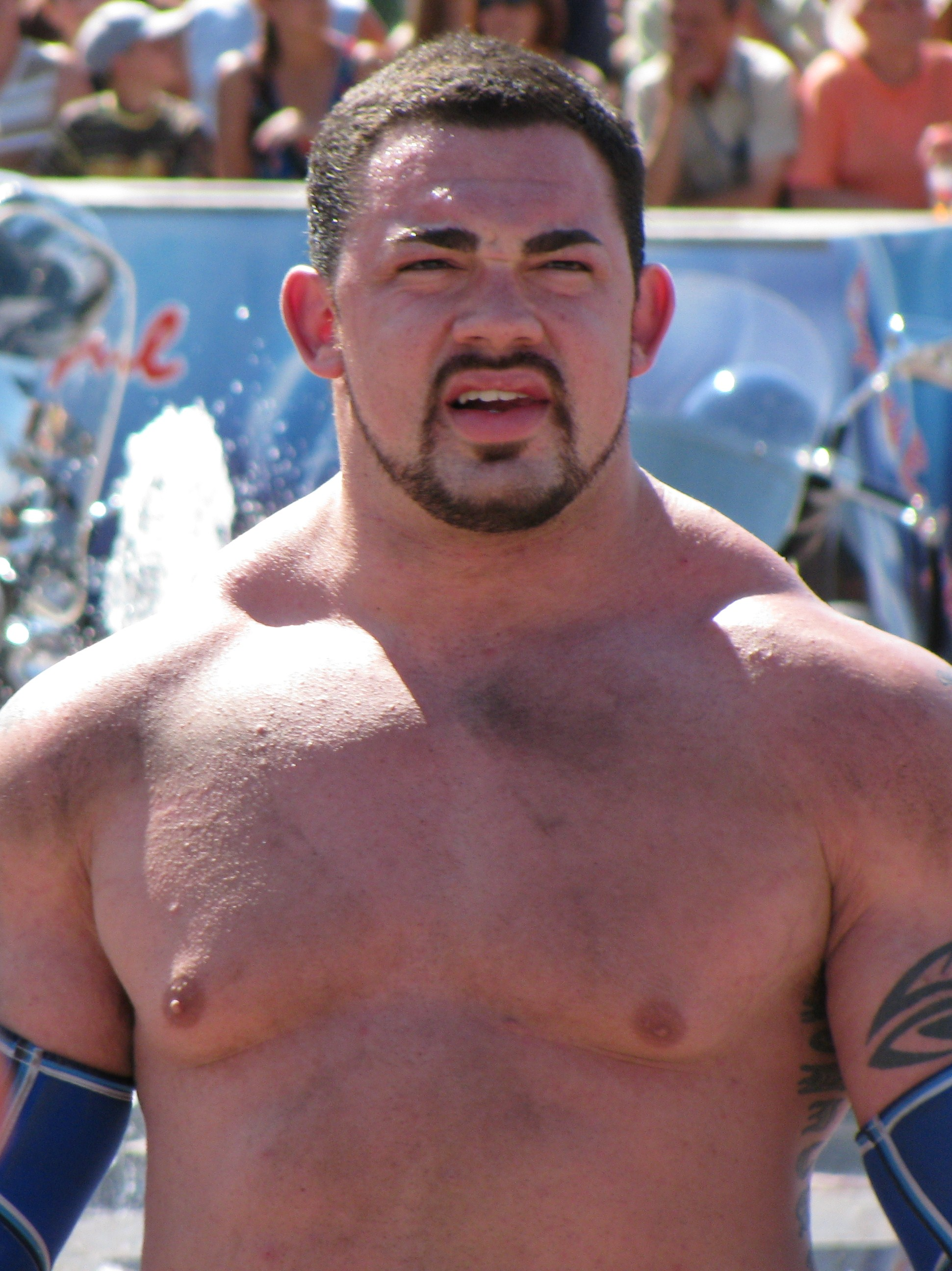

Personal information
- Born: August 21, 1985 (age 41) Framingham, Massachusetts, US
- Education: Arizona State University
- Height: 6 ft 2 in (1.88 m)
- Spouses: Karli Nee (formerly, Karli Kaufman)
- Children: Ava and Aiden
Medal record
Strongman
Representing United States
World's Strongest Man
Qualified	2005 World's Strongest Man
Qualified	2006 World's Strongest Man
8th	2007 World's Strongest Man
Qualified	2008 World's Strongest Man
Qualified	2009 World's Strongest Man
Strongman Super Series
7th	2005 Mohegan Sun Grand Prix
5th	2006 Mohegan Sun Grand Prix
2nd	2007 Mohegan Sun Grand Prix
WSF World Strongmen Championships
6th	2012
WSF World Cup
3rd	2011 WSF Asian World Cup
Strongman Champions League
10th	2010 Ireland
All-American Strongman Challenge
2nd	2007
America's Strongest Man
4th	2006

Kevin Nee (born August 21, 1985) is an American professional Strongman athlete.

== Biography ==
Born in Framingham, Massachusetts, Nee began his strength training at the age of 14. As a high school student at Hopedale High School in Hopedale, Massachusetts, he began competing in the teenage level Strongman competitions. He won the teenage heavyweight division of 2002 USA Teenage Strongman. Nee has competed in five of the World's Strongest Man championships. In 2005, he competed in the tournament held in Chengdu, China; at the age of 20 years and 46 days, and made history as the youngest competitor ever to have qualified to the World's Strongest Man.

Nee also competed in the 2006 World's Strongest Man championship in Sanya, China, but did not make it to the final round of competition. In 2007, at the World's Strongest Man championship held in Long Beach, California, Nee finished in eighth place. He has also competed in the annual World's Strongest Man Super Series Competition at Mohegan Sun in Uncasville, Connecticut, where he finished fifth in 2006 and second in 2007.

While he was still competing as an amateur strongman, Nee was featured in a 2005 episode of the MTV reality show True Life: I Want the Perfect Body 2. It was in the same episode that it was mentioned he was named the Strongest Teen in the United States. In 2007, Men's Fitness magazine named him among the world's “25 Fittest Men”.

The 6'2, 295-pound Nee, who has a degree in supply chain management from Arizona State University, resides in the Boston, MA area.

== Competition record ==
- 2005
  - 7. - Super Series 2005: Mohegan Sun
  - 9. - Pan-American Strongman 2005
- 2006
  - 7. - FitExpo Strongman 2006
  - 7. - Ironman Strongman 2006
  - 5. - Super Series 2006: Mohegan Sun
  - 4. - America's Strongest Man 2006
  - 7. - World Strongman Cup Federation 2006: Grodzisk Mazowiecki

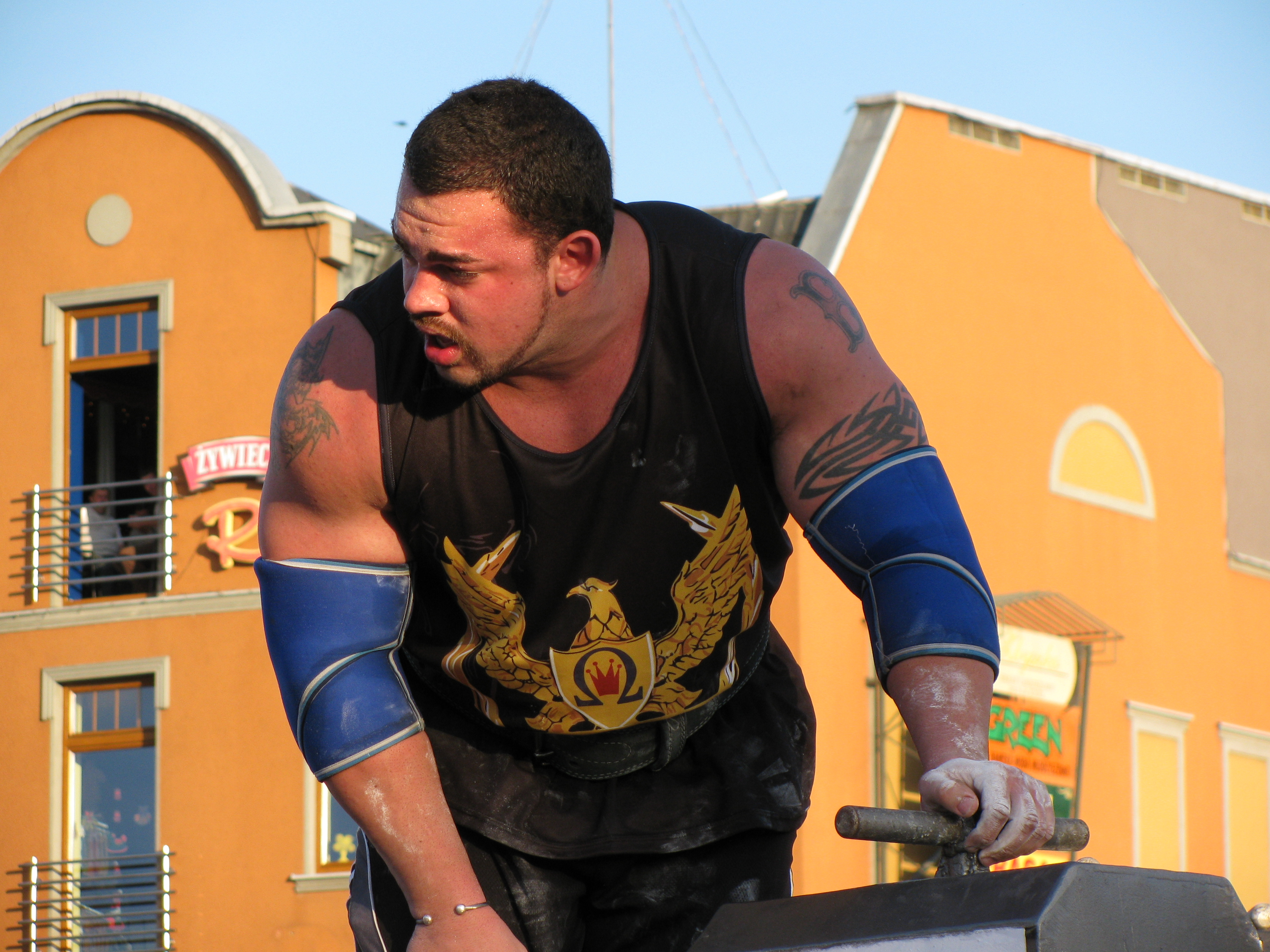
Kevin Nee at Giants Live 2009: Poland

- 2007
  - 5. - Polish Grand Prix
  - 2. - All-American Strongman Challenge 2007
  - 2. - Super Series 2007: Mohegan Sun
  - 6. - Super Series 2007: Venice Beach
  - 4. - World Strongman Cup Federation 2007: Dartford
  - 8. - World's Strongest Man 2007, United States
- 2008
  - 7. - Super Series 2008: New York
  - 5. - Super Series 2008: Viking Power Challenge
- 2009
  - 5. - All-American Strongman Challenge 2009
  - 5. - Giants Live 2009: Stavanger
  - 11. - Super Series 2009: Bucharest
  - 4. - Giants Live 2009: Malbork
- 2010
  - 10. - Strongman Champions League 2010 Ireland
- 2011
  - 3. - Asian World Cup

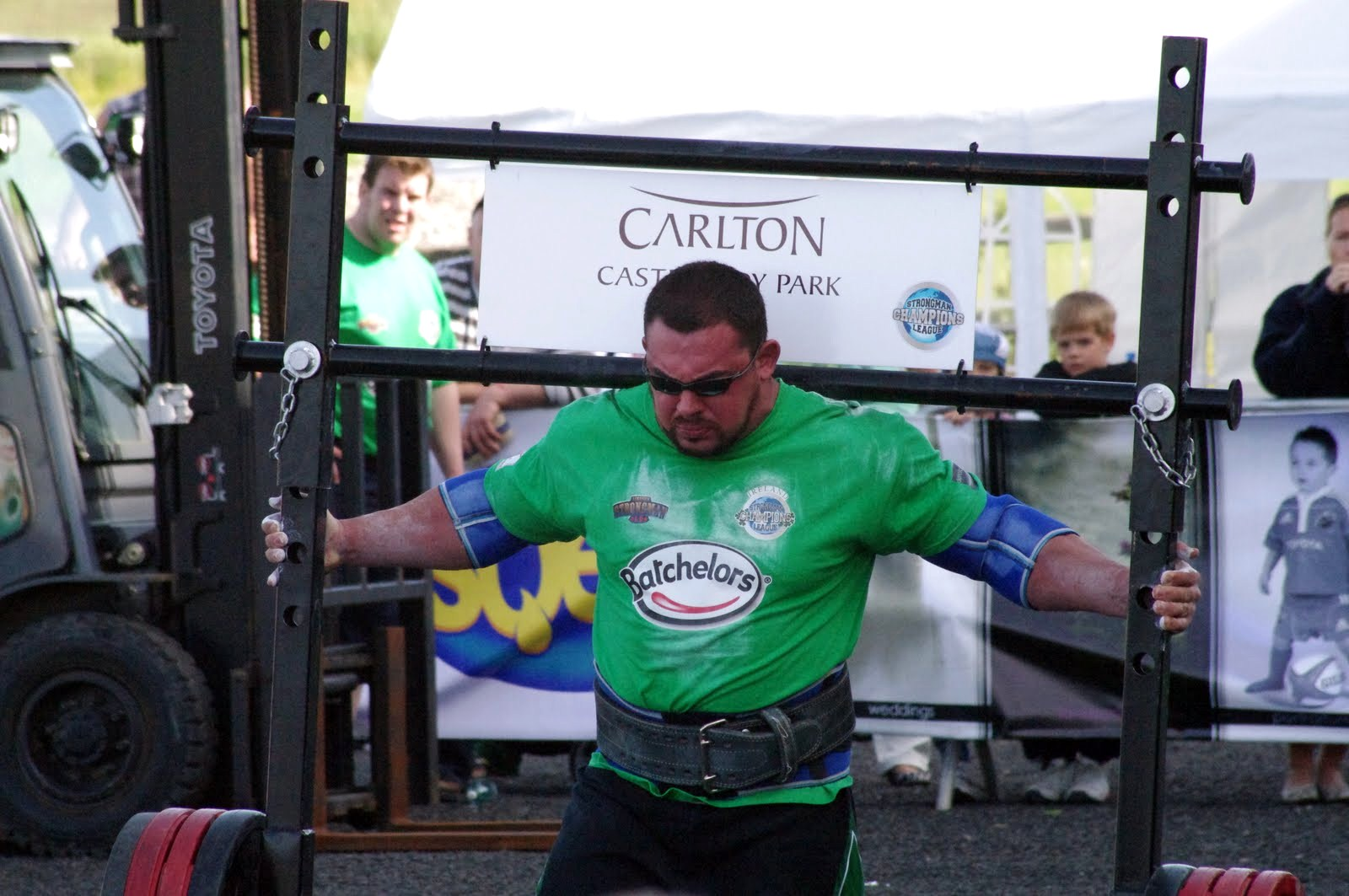
Kevin Nee in 2010
