= Stojan Todorchev =

Bulgarian strongman

Stoyan Todorchev
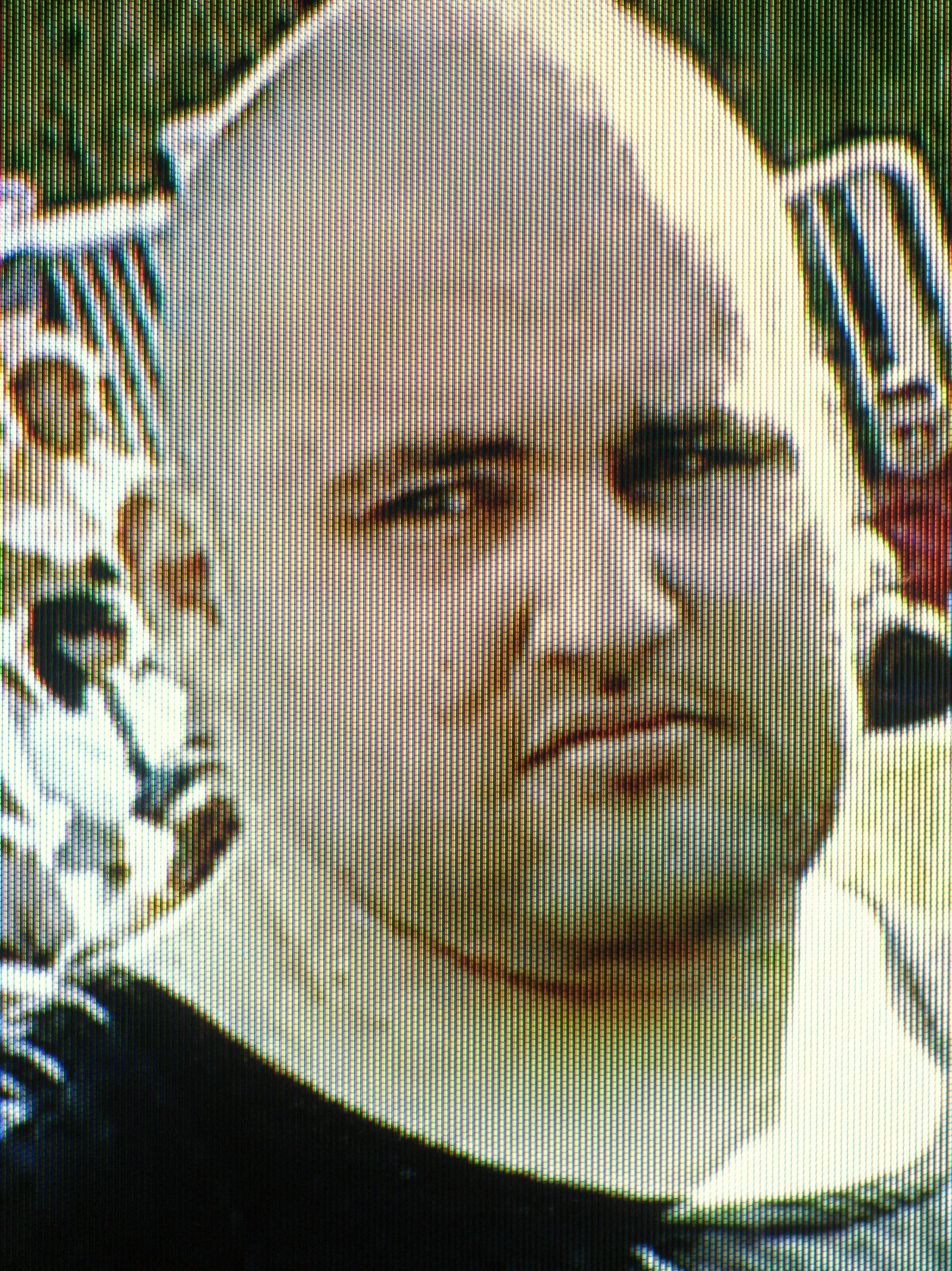
- Todorchev in 2007

Personal information
- Born: Стоян Тодорчев; 27 October 1984 (age 41) Bulgaria
- Occupation: Strongman
- Height: 197 cm (6 ft 6 in)
Medal record
Strongman
Representing Bulgaria
World's Strongest Man
Qualified	2007 World's Strongest Man
Qualified	2010 World's Strongest Man
Strongman Super Series
4th	2009 Mohegan Sun
2nd	2009 Venice Beach
2nd	2009 Sweden
2nd	2009 Overall
3rd	2010 Mohegan Sun
Europe's Strongest Man
6th	2007 Europe's Strongest Man
7th	2008 Europe's Strongest Man
World Strongman Federation
1st	2007 Grand Prix of Khanty-Mansijsk
3rd	2008 WSF World Cup Irkutsk
World Strongman Cup Federation
1st	2006 WSMC Austrian Cup
3rd	2006 WSMC Poland Cup
3rd	2006 WSMC Russian Cup
2nd	2007 WSMC Russian Cup
2nd	2007 WSMC England Cup
2nd	2007 Overall
Bulgaria's Strongest Man
1st	2004 Bulgaria's Strongest Man
1st	2005 Bulgaria's Strongest Man

Stoyan Todorchev (Bulgarian: Стоян Тодорчев; born 27 October 1984) is a Bulgarian strongman competitor and entrant to the World's Strongest Man competition.

== Strongman career ==
Stoyan Todorchev was twice Bulgaria's Strongest Man in 2004 and 2005. He finished sixth in the 2007 edition of Europe's Strongest Man. Stoyan competed in the 2007 World's Strongest Man where he finished third in his qualifying group behind Don Pope and Sebastian Wenta, failing to qualify for the finals. he competed again at the 2010 World's Strongest Man but again failed to qualify for the finals. Stoyan finished second overall for the 2009 Strongman Super Series season behind Brian Shaw.

== Personal records ==
- Farmer's walk (no straps) – 170 kg (375 lb) per each hand for 30m course in 13.53 seconds (2010 Strongman Super Series Mohegan Sun Grand Prix) (World Record)

== Competition record ==
=== 2004 ===
- #1 - Bulgaria's Strongest Man

=== 2005 ===
- #1 - Bulgaria's Strongest Man

=== 2006 ===
- #1 - World Strongman Cup Federation 2006: Wiedeń
- #3 - World Strongman Cup Federation 2006: Grodzisk Mazowiecki
- #3 - World Strongman Cup Federation 2006: Podolsk

=== 2007 ===
- #2 - Polish Grand Prix
- #2 - Europe's Strongest Man 2007
- #2 - World Strongman Cup Federation 2007: Moscow
- #2 - World Strongman Cup Federation 2007: Dartford
- #1 - Grand Prix of Khanty-Mansijsk (WSMC)

=== 2008 ===
- #3 - World Strongman Federation: Irkuck
- #1 - The Globe's Strongest Man, Grand Prix Moskwy
- #4 - Strongman Champions League 2008: Sofia
- #7 - Europe's Strongest Man 2008
- #2 - Poland vs Europe

=== 2009 ===
- #5 - Super Series 2009: Bukareszt
- #3 - The Globe's Strongest Man, Grand Prix Moscow
- #2 - Super Series 2009: Venice Beach
- #2 - Super Series 2009: Göteborg
