= 2007 World's Strongest Man =

Strongman competition in 2007

Competition information
- Dates: 15-23 September 2007
- Venue: Monarch Beach Golf Links; Hilton Anaheim; Huntington Beach Pier
- Location: Los Angeles, California
- Country: United States
- Athletes participating: 25
- Nations participating: 14

Champion(s)
- (Poland) Mariusz Pudzianowski

The 2007 World's Strongest Man was the 30th edition of World's Strongest Man and was won by Mariusz Pudzianowski from Poland. It was his fourth and record tying title. Sebastian Wenta from Poland finished second, and Terry Hollands from the United Kingdom finished third after finishing seventh the previous year. 2006 champion Phil Pfister from the United States finished fourth. The contest was held in Anaheim, California.

== Qualifying heats ==
=== Heat 1 ===
#	Name	Nationality	Pts
1	Tarmo Mitt	Estonia	24
2	Phil Pfister	United States	21
3	Elbrus Nigmatullin	Russia	16
4	Dominic Filiou	Canada	15.5
5	Darren Sadler	England	13.5

=== Heat 2 ===
#	Name	Nationality	Pts
1	Don Pope	United States	21.5
2	Sebastian Wenta	Poland	21
3	Stojan Todorchev	Bulgaria	17
4	Mark Westaby	England	16
5	Karl Gillingham	United States	14.5

=== Heat 3 ===
#	Name	Nationality	Pts
1	Mark Felix	England	26.5
2	Kevin Nee	United States	21.5
3	Jarek Dymek	Poland	17
4	Florian Trimpl	Germany	16.5
5	Derek Boyer	Australia	8.5

=== Heat 4 ===
#	Name	Nationality	Pts
1	Mariusz Pudzianowski	Poland	25
2	Dave Ostlund	United States	19
3	Jimmy Marku	England	18.5
4	Janne Virtanen	Finland	14
5	Kristinn Óskar Haraldsson	Iceland	12.5

=== Heat 5 ===
#	Name	Nationality	Pts
1	Terry Hollands	England	23.5
2	Magnus Samuelsson	Sweden	23
3	Raivis Vidzis	Latvia	19.5
4	Jason Bergmann	United States	12.5
5	Richard Skog	Norway	11.5

== Final ==
Keen to exact revenge for losing his title the previous year, Mariusz Pudzianowski dominated the opening event, the Loading Race, finishing over 6 seconds faster than anyone else and a full 10 seconds in front of defending champion Phil Pfister. Estonian Tarmo Mitt, appearing in his third consecutive final, was forced to withdraw from the competition after tearing his bicep whilst trying to lift the first barrel onto the platform. After finishing second and third respectively in the first event, Terry Hollands and Dave Ostlund both found the following event, the Safe Lift, far more challenging; struggling with the apparent lack of balance in the equipment as well as the strong winds, Hollands could only manage 3 successful lifts whilst Ostlund could only manage 1. Pudzianowski performed well again, managing 15 repetitions, but was beaten out of first place by his fellow countryman Sebastian Wenta, who completed a remarkable 17 repetitions.

Wenta would continue his good form into the next event, the Fingals Fingers, by setting a new world record time of 30.92 seconds, eclipsing Phil Pfister's record time from the previous year. Pfister also beat his own personal best, but finished just behind Wenta in 31.78 seconds. Many thought that this strong performance would enable Pfister to close the gap to Pudzianowski, for whom the Fingals Fingers had always seemed to prove to be a 'bogey' event in previous years. However, Pudzianowski stunned the rest of the competition by finishing ahead of Pfister, completing the course in 31.15 seconds. He would say in an interview with former champion Svend Karlsson shortly after the event that he was so determined to improve in this specific event, he had practiced Fingals Fingers for one hour every day for two months leading up to the competition. Elsewhere, Kevin Nee and Mark Felix both fell even further behind the rest of the competition, being the only two athletes to fail to flip all five fingers. After the first three events, the standings were:

#	Name	Nationality	Pts
1	Mariusz Pudzianowski	Poland	28
2	Sebastian Wenta	Poland	26
3	Phil Pfister	United States	23
4=	Magnus Samuelsson	Sweden	17
4=	Dave Ostlund	United States	17
6	Terry Hollands	England	16
7	Don Pope	United States	14.5
8	Kevin Nee	United States	11
9	Mark Felix	England	9.5
10	Tarmo Mitt	Estonia	0 (retired due to injury)

The fourth event of the final, the Deadlift, saw Phil Pfister's chances of a repeat championship evaporate. Suffering from a minor back injury, he managed only 2 successful lifts. Mark Felix, however, proved his claim as being the best deadlifter in the field by winning the event with 11 repetitions. Pudzianowski managed 10 lifts, but was denied an 11th repetition by head referee Colin Bryce who correctly judged that Pudzianowski did not control the bar back to the ground. Hollands meanwhile gained significant ground on both Pfister and Wenta by making 8 repetitions, whilst Don Pope was the only athlete to fail to make a single successful lift. Hollands continued his good form in the Fire Engine Pull, edging out Pudzianowski for first place in the event by just 0.12 seconds, and leapfrogging Pfister into third place in the overall standings. Meanwhile, a disappointing fifth place finish for Pfister all but confirmed that he would be relinquishing his title. The sixth event of the final, the Car Walk, saw solid performances from several athletes, with 5 of the first 8 competitors completing the course in under 25 seconds. However, Pudzianowski proceeded to destroy the rest of the field, finishing the course in 14.62 seconds, nearly a full 5 seconds faster than anyone else. In so doing, he confirmed himself as the new World's Strongest Man with an event to spare, with 2 first place finishes and 4 second place finishes in the first six events of the final. In the final event, the Atlas Stones, Pfister managed to defeat Pudzianowski again in a head-to-head contest after Pudzianowski's fourth stone rolled off its platform, but his time was not fast enough to catch Hollands for a podium finish. Hollands and Wenta meanwhile were matched up against each other in a 'winner-take-all' scenario to decide who would finish in second. Both men lifted all five stones in under 20 seconds - itself a very rare occurrence in Strongman at the time - but Wenta completed the stones in a fractionally faster time, confirming his second place finish.

Pudzianowski and Wenta's 1-2 finish marked just the second time since 1983 that the top two finishers in World's Strongest Man were from the same country (the other being Jouko Ahola and Janne Virtanen's 1-2 finish in 1999), whilst Hollands' outstanding fightback to finish third marked the first time a British athlete had finished on the podium since Gary Taylor won the event in 1993.

The final standings were:

#	Name	Nationality	Pts
1	Mariusz Pudzianowski	Poland	59
2	Sebastian Wenta	Poland	54
3	Terry Hollands	England	52
4	Phil Pfister	United States	46
5	Magnus Samuelsson	Sweden	39
6	Dave Ostlund	United States	38
7	Mark Felix	England	33.5
8	Kevin Nee	United States	31
9	Don Pope	United States	21.5
10	Tarmo Mitt	Estonia	0 (retired due to injury)

Preceded by 2006 World's Strongest Man	2007 World's Strongest Man	Succeeded by 2008 World's Strongest Man
