= Hassan Ebadi =

- Born: 1986 (age 38–39); Iran
- Occupation: Strongman
- Height: 1.92 m (6 ft 3 1/2 in)

Hassan Ebadi (Persian: حسن عبادی; born 1986) is an Iranian Strongman, competing for Iran in international strongman competitions.

He participated four times (2008–2011) in Iran's Strongest Man competition, and could become the Runner-up in 2008.

== See also ==
- Iran's Strongest Man
- World Strongman Cup Federation
