= Mehdi Mirdavoudi =

Iranian boxer (born 1977)

Personal information
- Full name: Mehdi Mirdavoudi
- Nationality: Iran
- Born: September 11, 1977 (age 48) Iran
- Height: 2.00 m (6 ft 6 1/2 in)
- Weight: 145 kg (320 lb)

Sport
- Sport: Boxing
- Weight class: Heavyweight

Mehdi Mirdavoudi (Persian: مهدی میرداوودی; born September 11, 1977) is an Iranian heavyweight kick-boxer and a professional strongman, competing for Iran in international competitions.

He competed for Iran in K-1 World Grand Prix 2006 in Seoul.

He also competed in several internal and international strongman competitions. He participated two times (1998 & 2004) in Iran's Strongest Man competition and could reach the final in both times.

== See also ==
- K-1 World Grand Prix 2006 in Seoul
- Iran's Strongest Man
