= Igor Pedan =

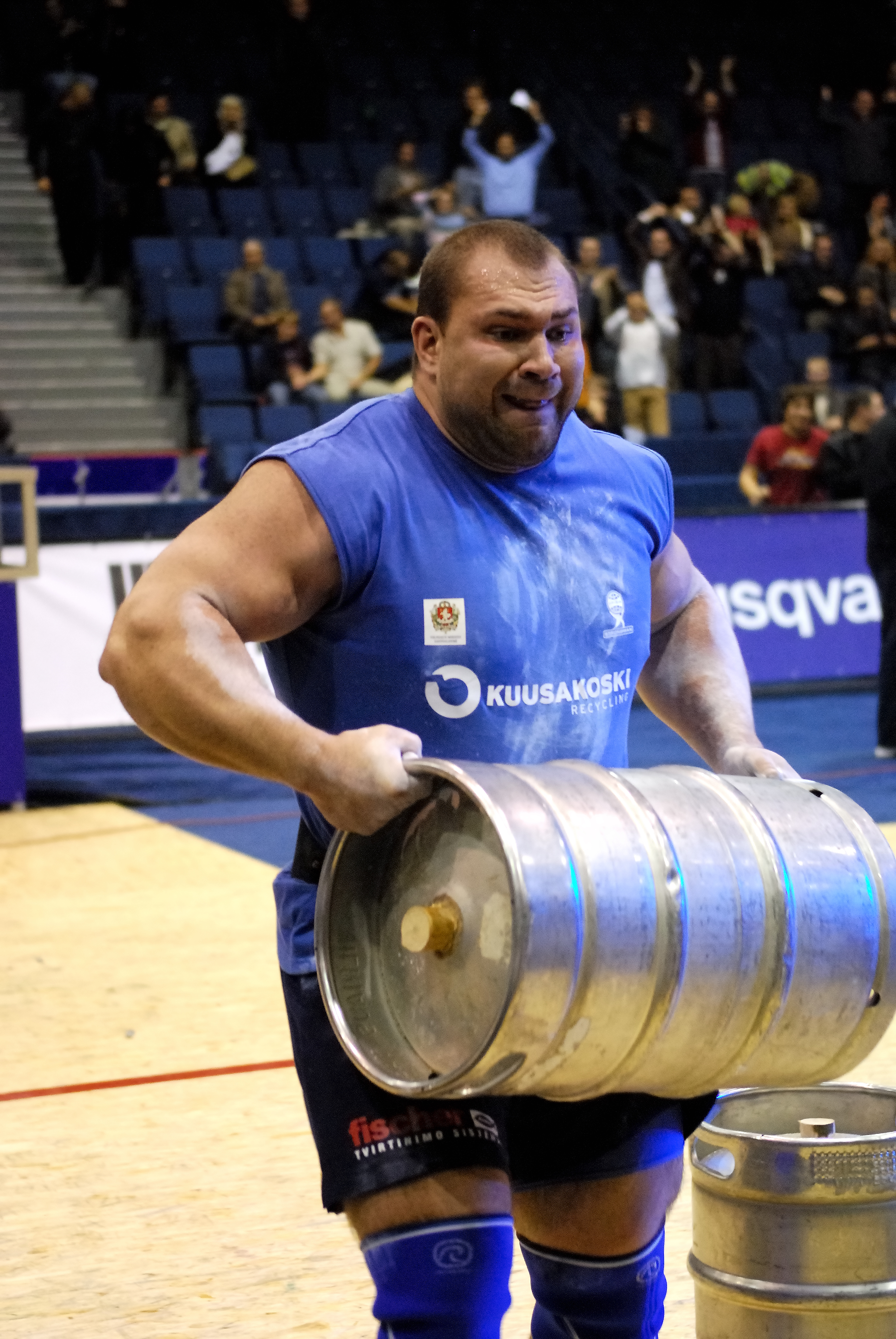

Personal information
- Born: Russia
- Occupation: Strongman
- Height: 6 ft 1 in (1.85 m)
Medal record
Strongman
Representing Russia
World's Strongest Man
Qualified	2003 World's Strongest Man
IFSA World Open
4th	2005 IFSA World Open
IFSA Strongman World Championships
Qualified	2006 IFSA Strongman World Championships
Qualified	2007 IFSA Strongman World Championships
IFSA World Open
4th	2005 IFSA World Open
IFSA Strongman World Team Championship
2nd	2007 IFSA World Team Championships
World Strongman Cup Federation
1st	2004 Germany
1st	2004 Austria
2nd	2004 Poland
2nd	2004 Russia
2nd	2004 Overall
Russia's Strongest Man
1st	2004

Igor Pedan is a -born Russian strongman who is best known for competing in the IFSA Strongman World Championships and World's Strongest Man. Igor was born in Ukraine, currently he resides in Moscow, and competes for Russia. He won the title Russia's Strongest Man in 2004, and won the 3rd competition of the United Strongman Series in Moscow in 2005.

== Personal records ==
- Fingal's Fingers – 250 kg (551 lb) 6 fingers in 33.82 seconds (2006 United Strongman Series Kyiv) (World Record)
