= Farzad Mousakhani =

Iranian strongman

- Born: 1981 (age 44–45); Iran
- Occupation: Strongman
- Height: 1.90 m (6 ft 3 in)

Competition record

Strongman

Representing (Iran)

World Strongman Cup
Participated	2007 Belarus

Strongman Champions League
10th	2008 Latvia
10th	2008 Finland

Iran's Strongest Man
Qualified	2004
2nd	2007

Farzad Mousakhani (Persian: فرزاد موسی خانی; born 1981) is an Iranian strongman competing for Iran in international strongman competitions.

He participated three times in Iran's Strongest Man finishing in 2nd place in 2007.

== Personal Records ==
- Squat: 410 kilograms (900 lb)
- Bench Press: 280 kilograms (620 lb)
- Deadlift for max weight: 400 kilograms (880 lb)
- Deadlift for reps: 360 kilograms (790 lb) for 7 repetitions
- Log Lift for max weight: 195 kilograms (430 lb)
- Log Lift for reps: 140 kilograms (310 lb) for 9 repetitions in 60 seconds
- Farmer's Walk with 150 kilograms (330 lb) in each hand: 40 meters in 18.65 seconds
- Yoke Race with 380 kilograms (840 lb): 20 meters in 9.20 seconds
- Yoke Race with 410 kilograms (900 lb): 20 meters in 16.80 seconds
- Atlas Stones: 200 kilograms (440 lb), 4 repetitions, 140 centimeters high platform

== See also ==
- Iran's Strongest Man
- World Strongman Cup Federation
