= Aidin Khataei =

Iranian actor and bodybuilder

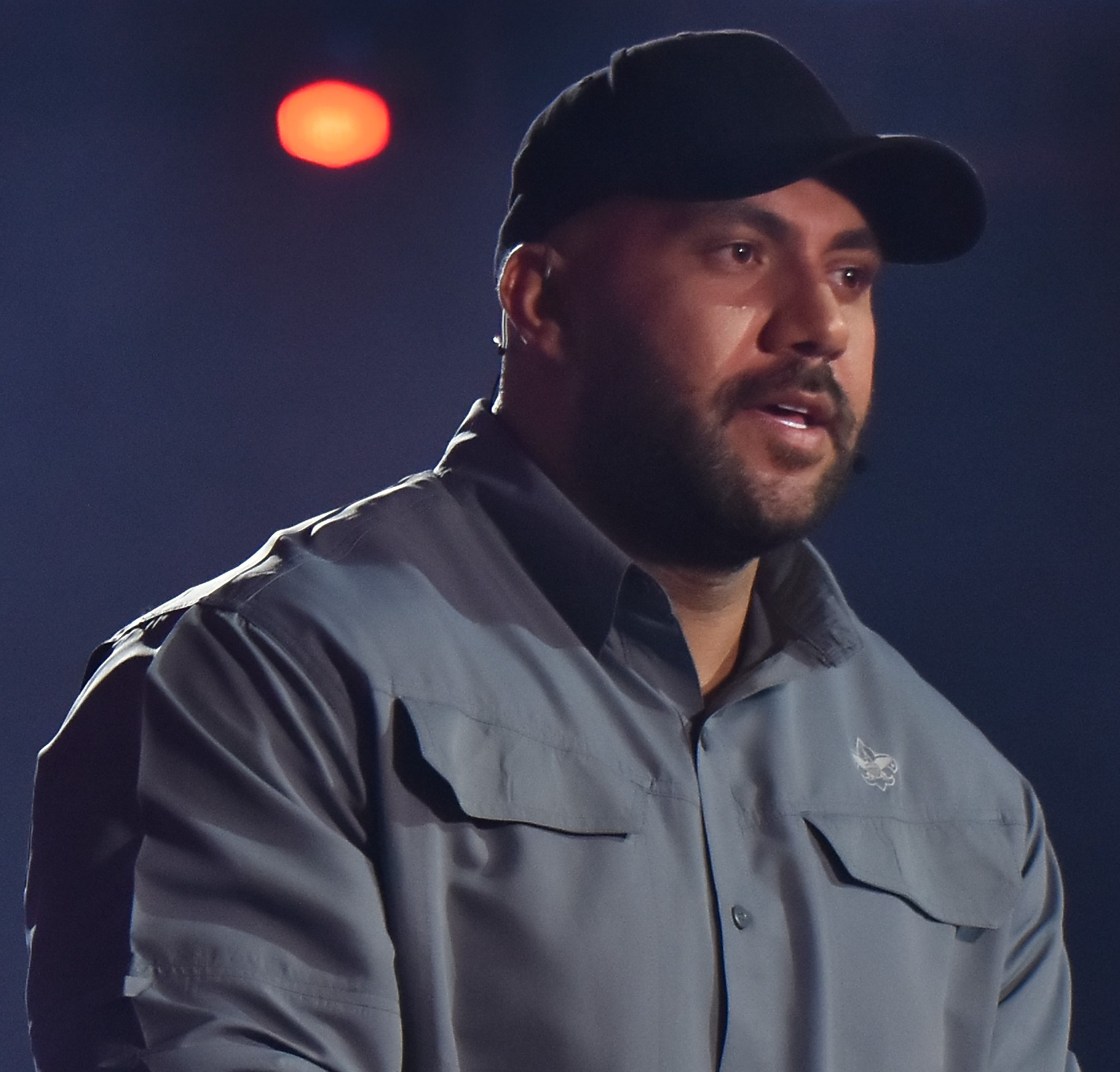
- Born: 14 May 1984 (age 41); Tehran, Iran
- Occupations: Actor; bodybuilder; TV host
- Years active: 1982–present
- Notable work: Kalantar 3 Mokhtarnameh; Bacheha-ye Nesbatan Bad; The Fitilehs and Mah Pishooni; Forgotten; Sagband; Tahamtan
- Website: Official Instagram Profile

Aidin Khataei Asl (Persian: آیدین ختائی; born 14 May 1984 in Tehran) is an Iranian professional bodybuilder, TV presenter and actor.

== Professional life ==
=== Sports ===
For the first time, he appeared in the Iran's Strongest Man on TV.

=== Acting ===
He also has a history of appearing in the films "Mokhtarnameh" and "Az Yad Rafteha" and "Sag Band".

== Performances ==
Together with Behdad Salimi, he was the host of the Tahmatan program.
