= Mehrab Fatemi =

Iranian strongman and powerlifter

- Born: مهراب فاطمی; 1975 (age 50–51); Tehran, Iran
- Occupations: Powerlifter, Strongman
- Height: 1.86 m (6 ft 1 in)

Competition record

Strongman

Representing (Iran)

Iran's Strongest Man
1st	1998 Iran's Strongest Man	
1st	2001 Iran's Strongest Man	
1st	2005 Iran's Strongest Man	
1st	2006 Iran's Strongest Man	
7th	2010 Iran's Strongest Man	

Powerlifting

Representing (Iran)

Asian Powerlifting Championships
1st	2001	+125kg
1st	2003	+125kg
1st	2004	+125kg

Mehrab Fatemi (Persian: محراب فاطمی or مهراب فاطمی; born 1975) is an Iranian strongman and powerlifter.

== Strongman career ==
Mehrab participated five times in Iran's Strongest Man competition, and hold the record of most wins with 4 wins (1998, 2001, 2005–2006).

== See also ==
- Iran's Strongest Man
- World Powerlifting Congress
- World Strongman Cup Federation
