= Estonia's Strongest Man =

Sports Competition

Tournament information
- Location: Estonia
- Established: 1999
- Format: Multi-event competition

Estonia's Strongest Man (Estonian: Eesti tugevaim mees) is an annual strongman competition held in Estonia and featuring exclusively Estonian athletes. The contest was established in 1999. Rauno Heinla holds the record for most wins with 6 titles, while Tarmo Mitt and Andrus Murumets share 5 titles each.

It is a multi event competition that tests competitors in a number of different lifts and events. The winner is decided by the aggregate across all events.

== Champions breakdown ==
Year	Champion	Runner-up	3rd place
1999	(Estonia) Tarmo Mitt	(To be confirmed)	(To be confirmed)
2000	(Estonia) Tarmo Mitt	(To be confirmed)	(To be confirmed)
2001	(Estonia) Tarmo Mitt	(To be confirmed)	(To be confirmed)
2002	(Estonia) Andrus Murumets	(To be confirmed)	(Estonia) Tarmo Mitt
2003	(Estonia) Tarmo Mitt	(Estonia) Andrus Murumets	(To be confirmed)
2004	(Estonia) Tarmo Mitt	(Estonia) Andrus Murumets	(To be confirmed)
2005	(Estonia) Andrus Murumets	(To be confirmed)	(To be confirmed)
2006	(Estonia) Andrus Murumets	(To be confirmed)	(To be confirmed)
2007	(Estonia) Andrus Murumets	(To be confirmed)	(To be confirmed)
2008	(Estonia) Rauno Heinla	(To be confirmed)	(To be confirmed)
2009	(Estonia) Andrus Murumets	(To be confirmed)	(Estonia) Tarmo Mitt
2010	(Estonia) Rauno Heinla	(To be confirmed)	(To be confirmed)
2011	(Estonia) Rauno Heinla	(To be confirmed)	(To be confirmed)
