= Moslem Darabi =

Iranian strongman (born 1981)

Personal information
- Born: June 6, 1981 Sahneh, Kermanshah Province, Iran
- Occupation: Strongman
- Height: 1.98 m (6 ft 6 in)

Sport
- Club: www.moslemdarabi.com
Medal record
Competition record
Strongman
Representing (Iran)
Iran's Strongest Man
2nd	2009 Iran's Strongest Man
2nd	2010 Iran's Strongest Man
1st	2011 Iran's Strongest Man
1st	2012 Iran's Strongest Man

Moslem Darabi (Persian: مسلم دارابی) (born 1981) is an Iranian strongman. He is the two time reigning Iran's Strongest Man. He was born in Sahneh, Kermanshah province.

== Strongman career ==
Darabi participated several times in Iran's Strongest Man competition, and reached the finals three times from 2009 to 2011. He finished runner-up in 2009 & and 2010 became the champion in 2011, and successfully defended his title in 2012.

== See also ==
- Iran's Strongest Man
- World Strongman Cup Federation
