= Oleksandr Lashyn =

Polish strength athlete

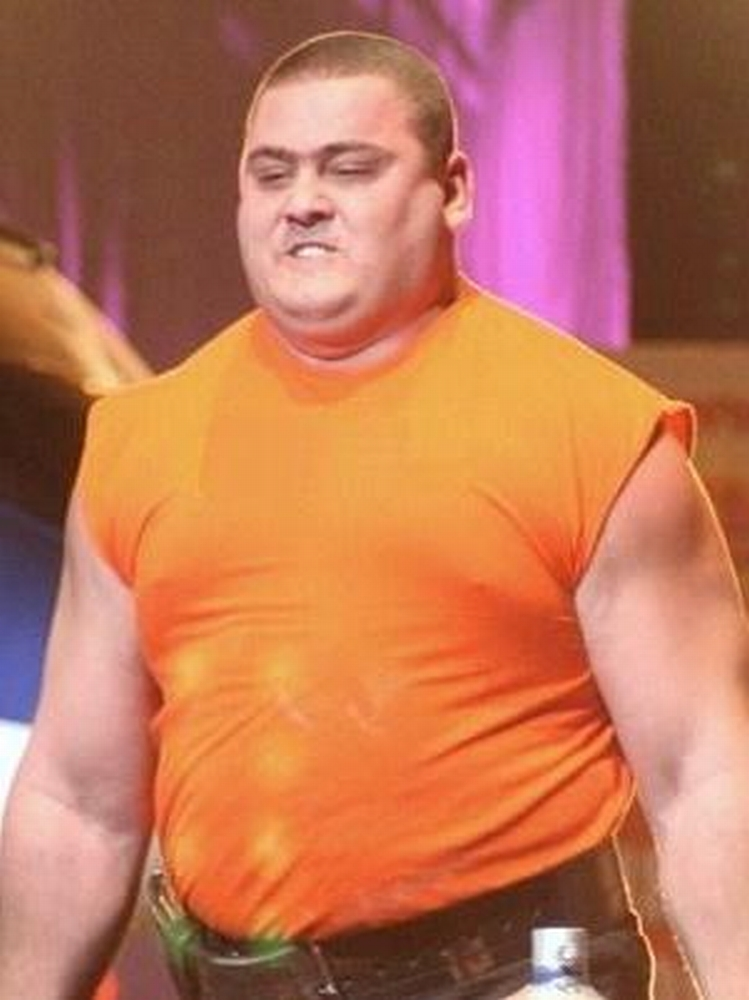
- Born: March 2, 1982 (age 43); Ukraine
- Occupation: Strongman
- Height: 1.94 m (6 ft 4 1/2 in)
- Title: Ukraine's Strongest Man

Competition record

Strongman

Representing Ukraine

Ukraine's Strongest Man
1st	2008 Ukraine's Strongest Man	
2nd	2009 Ukraine's Strongest Man	
1st	2010 Ukraine's Strongest Man	
1st	2011 Ukraine's Strongest Man	
1st	2012 Ukraine's Strongest Man	
1st	2013 Ukraine's Strongest Man	
1st	2015 Ukraine's Strongest Man	

Strongman Champions League
3rd	2008 Romania	

World Strongman Federation
3rd	2011 WSF World Cup Belarus	
1st	2012 WSF World Cup Ukraine	

WSF World Team Cup
1st	2011 WSF World Team Cup stage I	
2nd	2012 WSF CIS/Baltic Team Championships	

World Log Lift Championships
3rd	2008 World Log Lift Championships	

Oleksandr Lashyn (born March 2, 1982) is a professional strongman competitor from Ukraine. Olkesandr competes regularly in the WSF World Cup as well as the WSF World Team Cup, and has also competed in Strongman Champions League. Lashyn also won Ukraine's Strongest Man 6 times in 2008, 2010, 2011, 2012, 2013 and 2015 and placed third at the 2008 World Log Lift Championships.
