= Amadeus (play) =

1979 stage play by Peter Shaffer

- Playbill, 1981 (Broadhurst Theatre)
- Original language: English
- Written by: Peter Shaffer
- Characters: Wolfgang Amadeus Mozart; Antonio Salieri; Constanze Weber; Katherina Cavalieri; Emperor Joseph II; Count Orsini-Rosenberg; Baron Gottfried van Swieten; Giuseppe Bonno; Count Johann Kilian von Strack
- Subject: Biography of Wolfgang Amadeus Mozart
- Genre: Drama, tragedy
- Setting: 1783–1825; Vienna, Austria; the Court of Joseph II

Premiere
- Date: 2 November 1979
- Place: Royal National Theatre; London, England

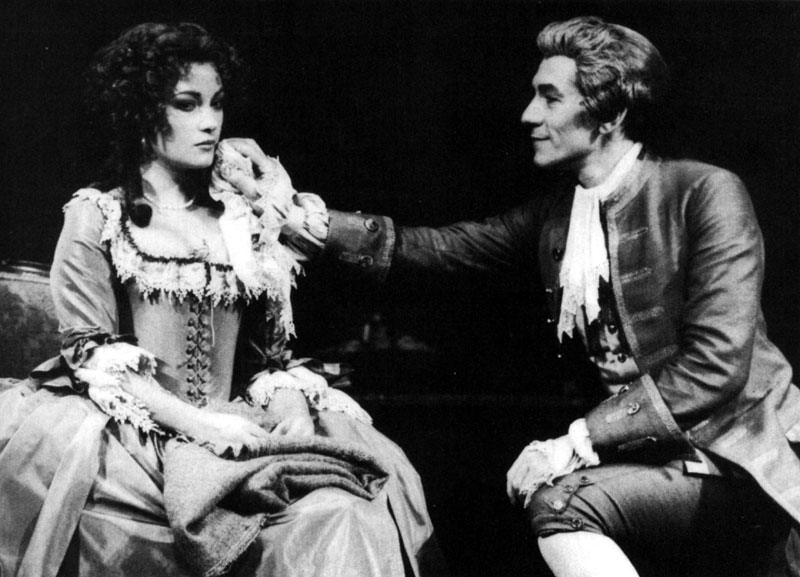
Jane Seymour (Constanze Mozart) alongside Ian McKellen (Antonio Salieri) in Amadeus, c. 1981.

Amadeus is a 1979 play by Peter Shaffer which gives a fictional account of the lives of composers Wolfgang Amadeus Mozart and Antonio Salieri, imagining a rivalry between the two at the court of Joseph II, Holy Roman Emperor. It was inspired by Alexander Pushkin's short 1830 play Mozart and Salieri, which Nikolai Rimsky-Korsakov used in 1897 as the libretto for an opera of the same name.

The play makes significant use of the music of Mozart, Salieri and other composers of the period. The premieres of Mozart's operas The Abduction from the Seraglio, The Marriage of Figaro, Don Giovanni, and The Magic Flute are the settings for key scenes. It was presented at the Royal National Theatre, London in 1979, then moved to Her Majesty's Theatre in the West End followed by a Broadway production. It won the 1981 Tony Award for Best Play and Shaffer adapted it for the much acclaimed 1984 film of the same name.

== Plot ==
Since the play's original run, Shaffer extensively revised his play, including changes to plot details; the following is common to all revisions.

The composer Salieri is an impoverished old man, having long outlived his fame. Speaking directly to the audience, he claims to have used poison to assassinate Mozart and promises to explain himself. The action then flashes back to the eighteenth century, at a time when Salieri is the wealthy and acclaimed court composer of the Austrian emperor. He adores Mozart's compositions and is thrilled at the chance to meet him, during a salon honouring his patron. But when he finally catches sight of Mozart, he is deeply disappointed to instead see the composer crawling around on his hands and knees, engaging in profane talk with his future bride Constanze Weber.

Salieri cannot reconcile Mozart's boorish behaviour with the genius that God has inexplicably bestowed upon him, nor can he understand why God would not bestow similar gifts on him, a devout and chaste Catholic. Salieri renounces God and vows to do everything in his power to destroy Mozart. He befriends the composer and becomes his close confidant, while actively hampering and disrupting his professional career. Mozart's own fortunes are not helped due to his vulgar nature. On more than one occasion, only the personal intervention of Emperor Joseph II allows Mozart to continue (interventions which Salieri opposes and then is all too happy to take credit for when Mozart assumes it was he who intervened). Salieri humiliates Constanze by forcing her to strip naked in front of him when she comes to him for help. He smears Mozart's character with the Imperial Court, ruining many opportunities for the composer.

A major theme in Amadeus is Mozart's repeated attempts to win the acceptance of Vienna's aristocracy with increasingly brilliant compositions, which are always frustrated either by Salieri's machinations or because the aristocrats cannot appreciate Mozart's innovations and willingness to challenge the accepted standards of classical music.

Towards the end of the play, with his life completely ruined, Mozart is visited one last time by Salieri, who reveals he has been Mozart's enemy all along. This triggers a complete mental and physical breakdown in the composer. He later dies in Constanze's arms, singing a nursery tune.

Salieri recounts how for the next thirty years, he was honored as the "greatest" composer in all of Europe, after which audiences began to turn away from his music and toward that of Mozart, as the world finally comes to recognize his true genius. With his tale finished, Salieri posts a written account of his false confession before attempting suicide with a shaving razor. He survives and his confession is met with disbelief and eventually rejected. Defeated, Salieri, doomed to live the rest of his life in obscurity and failure, absolves the audience of their mediocrity.

== Background and production ==
The play used as incidental music mainly works by Mozart, for which in the first stage production arrangements were made by Harrison Birtwistle; the only piece included of Salieri being a “banal greeting march” on which Mozart extemporises mockingly to produce "Non più andrai" (the aria which closes Act 1 of Le nozze di Figaro). Nicholas Kenyon argues that the play (and film) helped to rekindle interest in Salieri's music and increase performances of his operas.

=== Historical accuracy ===
Shaffer used artistic licence in his portrayals of Mozart and Salieri. Documentary evidence suggests that there may have been some occasional antipathy between the two men but the idea that Salieri was the instigator of Mozart's demise is not taken seriously by scholars of the men's lives and careers. In fact, there is evidence that they enjoyed a relationship marked by mutual respect. As an example, Salieri tutored Mozart's son Franz in music after his father's death. He probably conducted some of Mozart's works.

Writer David Cairns called Amadeus "myth-mongering" and argued against Shaffer's portrait of Mozart as "two contradictory beings, sublime artist and fool", positing instead that Mozart was "fundamentally well-integrated". Cairns also rejects the "romantic legend" that Mozart always wrote out perfect manuscripts of works already completely composed in his head, citing major and prolonged revisions to several manuscripts (see: Mozart's compositional method). Mozart scholar H. C. Robbins Landon commented that "it may prove difficult to dissuade the public from the current Schafferian view of the composer as a divinely gifted drunken lout, pursued by a vengeful Salieri. By the same token, Constanze Mozart, she (in the film) of the extraordinary décolleté and fatuous giggle, needs to be rescued from Schaffer's view of her".

=== Notable productions ===
Amadeus was first presented at the National Theatre, London in 1979, directed by Peter Hall and starring Paul Scofield as Salieri, Simon Callow as Mozart and Felicity Kendal as Constanze. (Callow appeared in the film version in a different role.) It was later transferred in modified form to Her Majesty's Theatre in the West End, starring Frank Finlay as Salieri. The cast also included Andrew Cruickshank (Rosenberg), Basil Henson (von Strack), Philip Locke (Greybig), John Normington (Joseph II) and Nicholas Selby (van Swieten).

The play premiered on Broadway on 11 December 1980 at the Broadhurst Theatre, with Ian McKellen as Salieri, Tim Curry as Mozart and Jane Seymour as Constanze. It ran for 1,181 performances, closing on 16 October 1983 and was nominated for seven Tony Awards (Best Actor for both McKellen and Curry, Best Director for Peter Hall, Best Play, Best Costume Design, Lighting and Set Design for John Bury), of which it won five (including Best Play and Best Actor for McKellen). In 2015, Curry stated in an interview that the original Broadway production was the favourite stage production that he had ever been in. During the run of the play McKellen was replaced by John Wood, Frank Langella, David Dukes, David Birney, John Horton and Daniel Davis. Curry was replaced by Peter Firth, Peter Crook, Dennis Boutsikaris, John Pankow, Mark Hamill and John Thomas Waite. Also playing Constanze were Amy Irving, Suzanne Lederer, Michele Farr, Caris Corfman and Maureen Moore.

In June 1981, Roman Polanski directed and co-starred (as Mozart) in a stage production of the play, first in Warsaw (with Tadeusz Łomnicki as Salieri), then at the Théâtre Marigny in Paris with François Périer as Salieri. The play was again directed by Polanski, in Milan, in 1999.

In 1982, Richard Wherrett directed a Sydney Theatre Company production at the Theatre Royal Sydney. It starred John Gaden as Salieri, Drew Forsythe as Mozart and Linda Cropper as Constanze, with Lyn Collingwood as Mrs Salieri and Robert Hughes as Venticello II. It ran from 6 April to 29 May 1982. Adam Redfield (as Mozart) and Terry Finn (as Constanze) appeared in the 1984 Virginia Stage Company production, at the Wells Theatre in Norfolk, Virginia, directed by Charles Towers.

The play was revived in 1998 at the Old Vic Theatre in London, directed again by Peter Hall and produced by Kim Poster. Starring in the play were Michael Sheen as Mozart, David Suchet as Salieri, Cindy Katz as Constanze and David McCallum as Joseph II. The play subsequently transferred to the Music Box Theatre, New York City, where it ran for 173 performances (15 December 1999 until 14 May 2000), and received Tony Award nominations for Best Revival and Best Actor in a Play (for Suchet's Salieri).

In July 2006, the Los Angeles Philharmonic presented a production of portions from the latest revision of the play at the Hollywood Bowl. Neil Patrick Harris starred as Mozart, Kimberly Williams-Paisley as Constanze Mozart, and Michael York as Salieri. Leonard Slatkin conducted the Philharmonic Orchestra. Rupert Everett played Salieri in a production at the refurbished Chichester Festival Theatre from 12 July through 2 August 2014. The cast included Joshua McGuire as Mozart, Jessie Buckley as Constanze and John Standing as Count Orsini-Rosenberg. Simon Jones played Joseph II. Peter Shaffer attended the play at the closing performance.

The play was revived at the National Theatre in London in a new production directed by Michael Longhurst, from October 2016 to March 2017. It starred Lucian Msamati as Salieri alongside Adam Gillen as Mozart, Karla Crome as Constanze, Hugh Sachs as Count Orsini-Rosenberg and Tom Edden as Joseph II, accompanied with a live orchestra by the Southbank Sinfonia. The production sold out with rave reviews and returned to the Olivier Theatre at the NT with Msamati and Gillen reprising the roles of Salieri and Mozart from February to 24 April 2018, again with rave reviews.

The play was performed at the Estates Theatre, where Don Giovanni made its premier in 1787, and where part of the 1984 film was shot, in 2017 for the first time in English in the Czech Republic, directed by Guy Roberts. Amadeus was directed by Javad Molania in Tehran in March 2018 at Hafez Hall. The play was directed by Işıl Kasapoğlu in Turkey in January/February 2020 at Uniq Hall Theatre, Istanbul. A new production, scheduled for December 2022 at the Sydney Opera House, was announced in July 2022 with Michael Sheen as Salieri and Rahel Romahn as Mozart. Sheen received Best Performer in a Play at the 2023 BroadwayWorld Australia - Sydney Awards for his Salieri.

The play was staged at Pasadena Playhouse in 2026, directed by Darko Tresnjak, featuring Sam Clemmett as Mozart, Lauren Worsham as Constanze, and Jefferson Mays as Salieri.

== Awards and nominations ==
- 1979 Evening Standard Theatre Award for Best Play
- 1981 Drama Desk Award for Outstanding New Play
- 1981 Tony Awards for Best Play and Best Leading Actor in a Play (Ian McKellen), Best Direction of a Play (Peter Hall), Best Scenic Design and Best Lighting Design (both John Bury). Nominations for Best Leading Actor in a Play (Tim Curry) and for Best Costume Design (John Bury).

== In other media ==
=== Radio ===
In 1983, BBC Radio 3 aired an audio version directed by Peter Hall which starred the original cast of his National Theatre production. The cast included:

- Paul Scofield as Antonio Salieri
- Simon Callow as Wolfgang Amadeus Mozart
- Felicity Kendal as Constanze Mozart
- John Normington as Joseph II, Holy Roman Emperor
- Nicholas Selby as Gottfried van Swieten
- Willoughby Goddard as Count Franz Orsini Rosenberg
- Basil Henson as Johann Killian Von Strack
- Donald Gee, Dermot Crowley as Venticelli
- Nigel Bellairs, Susan Gilmore, Peggy Marshall, Robin Meredith, Anne Sedgwick, William Sleigh, Glenn Williams as Citizens of Vienna

This radio production was re-broadcast on 2 January 2011 as part of Radio 3's Genius of Mozart season. To celebrate Mozart's 250th birthday in 2006, BBC Radio 2 broadcast an adaptation by Neville Teller of Shaffer's play in eight fifteen-minute episodes directed by Peter Leslie Wilde and narrated by F. Murray Abraham as Salieri. This version was re-broadcast 24 May – 2 June 2010 on BBC Radio 7.

=== Film ===
The 1984 film adaptation won the Academy Award for Best Picture. In total, the film won eight Academy Awards. It starred F. Murray Abraham as Salieri (winning the Oscar for Best Actor for his performance), Tom Hulce as Mozart (also nominated for Best Actor) and Elizabeth Berridge as Constanze. The play was thoroughly reworked by Shaffer and the film's director, Miloš Forman, with scenes and characters not found in the play. While the focus of the play is primarily on Salieri, the film goes further into developing the characters of both composers.

=== Television series ===
In November 2022, it was announced that Joe Barton would be adapting Amadeus into a television series for Sky. It will be directed by Julian Farino and Alice Seabright. On February 20, 2024, it was announced Will Sharpe would play Mozart, with Paul Bettany announced as Salieri, and Gabrielle Creevy as Constanze.

== See also ==
- Death of Mozart
