= Kim Poster =

American theater producer, attorney

- Born: 19 April 1957 (age 69); New York City, United States
- Education: Northwestern University
- Occupations: Theatre producer, attorney

Kim Poster (born 19 April 1957) is a London-based theatre producer from New York City.

== Early life ==
Kim Poster was educated in middle and high school at the Convent of the Sacred Heart, a Roman Catholic school for girls on East 91st Street, New York. Poster returned to Convent of the Sacred Heart to give a talk about the first time she saw the play Amadeus, which she produced on Broadway at the Music Box Theatre. She was banned for five days from the concert hall at the Convent of the Sacred Heart for her views on Amadeus, the play. Poster said the issue arose as a result of "the musical scandal of it; well, the musical controversy, which the very same people who now come to opening night accept as truth."

Kim Poster trained in acting and classical music in New York City, performing in off Broadway productions and singing as part of an ensemble with the New York Philharmonic musicians and L’Ensemble. She majored in Theatre and English at Northwestern University. She also earned a J.D. degree in New York City and became a member of the bars of New York in 1987 and California in 1989.

== Career ==
Poster acted as associate producer in on the original Broadway production of Grand Hotel: The Musical, having secured Paramount Picture's investment in the production. As Vice President of Productions at IRS Media, Poster oversaw various films including Tom & Viv, which received 2 Academy Award nominations. Poster relocated to London to produce theatre in 1993. In 2001 Poster established Stanhope Productions which produces projects in the London West End and on Broadway. Poster’s productions have been nominated for Olivier, Evening Standard, Critic Circle Awards and Tony Awards, and received the 2002 Best Play Olivier Award for Jitney and the Best Revival Olivier Award for Long Day's Journey Into Night.

On roles for leading actors, Poster, who produced Tennessee Williams' Summer and Smoke in London's West End in 2006, said that “one of the reasons producers revive Williams’ plays time and again is because he wrote brilliant roles that leading actresses want to play. Just as Lear is almost mandatory for a great actor, so Blanche du Bois in Streetcar and Amanda in The Glass Menagerie are iconic female roles.”

== Theatre Productions ==
Year	Title	Cast
2015	The Importance of Being Earnest	David Suchet
2014	Lights Out: WWI Centenary Commemorations (Theatre Consultant)	
2014	Encounters: Performers on Performance	Ruby Wax, Tim Minchin
2014	Carousel at the Arcola Theatre	Gemma Sutton, Tim Rogers
2012	Uncle Vanya	Ken Stott, Anna Friel, Samuel West, Laura Carmichael Broadway Buzz
2012	Long Days Journey Into Night	David Suchet, Laurie Metcalf, Trevor White, Kyle Soller Tatler
2010	An Ideal Husband	Samantha Bond, Alexander Hanson, Elliot Cowan The Stage
2010	All My Sons	David Suchet, Zoe Wanamaker Playbill
2010	Wet Weather Cover	Michael Brandon London Theatre Land
2009	Prick Up Your Ears	Matt Lucas
2009	A View From The Bridge	Ken Stott, Mary Elizabeth Masterantonio, Hayley Atwell Playbill
2009	Carousel	Lesley Garrett, Alexandra Silber
2009	The Black and White Ball	Katherine Kingsley
2007	Fiddler on the Roof	Henry Goodman The Stage
2007	Summer and Smoke	Rosamund Pike
2006	Tom and Viv	Will Keen, Frances O'Connor
2005	Epitaph for George Dillon	Joseph Fiennes
2005	The Rubenstein Kiss	Samantha Bond, Will Keen
2005	Telstar	Con O'Neill
2004	Beckett	Dougray Scott
2004	Singular Sensations	Michael Ball, Barbara Cook, Michael Fienstein
2003	Brand	Ralph Fiennes
2003	Through the Leaves	Simon Callow, Ann Mitchell
2003	A Woman of No Importance	Rupert Graves
2003	Ma Rainey's Black Bottom	Whoopi Goldberg, Charles Dutton
2002	Mrs Warren's Profession	Rebecca Hall, Brenda Bleythn
2002	The York Realist	Lloyd Owen, Richard Coyle, Anne Reid
2002	Lady Windermere's Fan	Vanessa Redgrave, Joely Richardson
2002	Jitney	Anthony Chisholm, Paul Butler, Willis Burks, Stephen McKinley Henderson
2001	An Inspector Calls	Edward Peel
2001	The Royal Family	Dame Judi Dench. Harriet Walter, Julia McKenzie, Toby Stephens, Emily Blunt
1999	Lenny	Eddie Izzard
1998	Amadeus	David Suchet, Michael Sheen
1996	Tolstoy	F. Murray Abraham

== Film Productions ==
Year	Title	Cast
2015	THE IMPORTANCE OF BEING EARNEST	David Suchet
2001	A Woman’s a Helluva Thing	Angus Macfadyen
1994	Tom & Viv	Miranda Richardson, Willem Dafoe
1992	One False Move	Billy Bob Thornton
1986	Man Facing South East	Lorenzo Quinteros
