= Reza Gheitasi =

Iran's Strongest Man 2024

Personal information
- Born: 1988 (age 37–38) Kabudarahang, Hamedan, Iran
- Height: 208 cm (6 ft 10 in)
- Weight: 168 kg (370 lb)

Sport
- Sport: Strongman
Medal record
Strongman
Siberian Power Show
3rd	2024 Siberian Power Show
Iran's Strongest Man
1st	2024 Iran's Strongest Man
Country's Strongest Man (Iran)
3rd	2020 Iranshahr
2nd	2022 Safadasht
1st	2023 Tehran

Reza Gheitasi (Persian: رضا قیطاسی) is an Iranian strongman, bodybuilder and power athlete known for his accomplishments in strength sports.

== Early career ==
Born in 1988 in Hamedan, He initially pursued volleyball, displaying his physical prowess from a young age. However, at the age of 23, influenced by his coaches and recognizing his potential in strength sports, he transitioned to bodybuilding and powerlifting.

== Strongman career ==
In October 2023, Gheitasi participated in the national competition for Strongest Man in Iran, competing in the +105 kg weight categories in both youth and adult divisions. Demonstrating his strength, he emerged victorious in the adult division, becoming the champion of the competition. In 2024, Gheitasi achieved a milestone victory by securing the title of Iran's Strongest Man.

== See also ==
- Iran's Strongest Man
