= Raivis Vidzis =

Latvian strongman

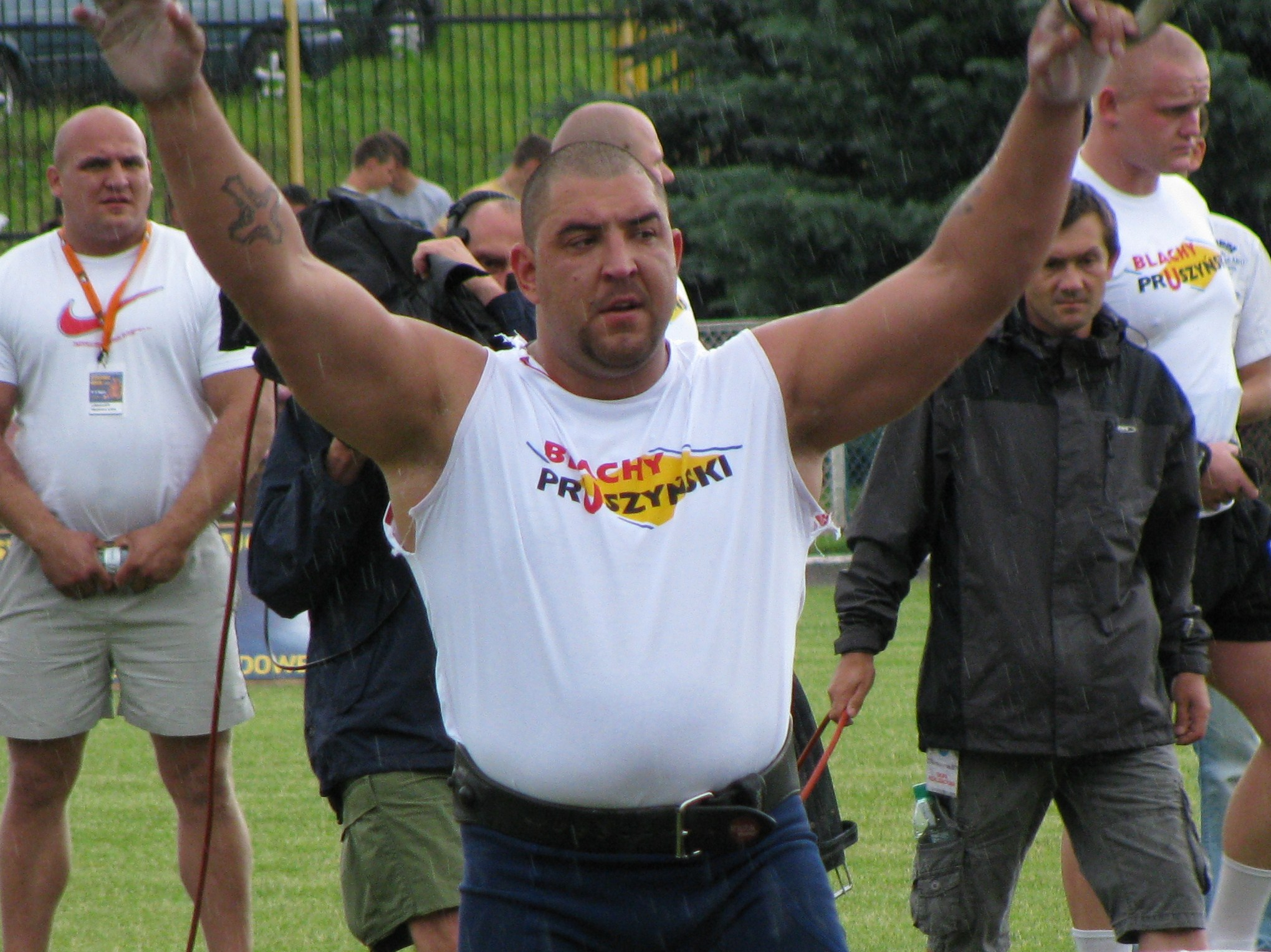

Personal information
- Born: Raivis Vidzis; 22 March 1976 (age 50) Ogre, Soviet Union
- Occupation(s): Strongman, Mixed Martial Artist
- Height: 5 ft 11 in (1.80 m)
Medal record
Strongman
Representing Latvia
World's Strongest Man
Qualified	2005 World's Strongest Man
9th	2006 World's Strongest Man
Qualified	2007 World's Strongest Man
Qualified	2008 World's Strongest Man
World Strongman Cup
1st	2004 Overall
1st	2005 Overall
3rd	2007 Overall
Europe's Strongest Man
5th	2005
4th	2007
World's Strongest Team
3rd	2005 (with Rolands Gulbis)
Latvia's Strongest Man
1st	2000
1st	2001
1st	2002
1st	2003

Raivis Vidzis (born 22 March 1976) is a Latvian retired strongman competitor. A two-time holder of the World Strongman Cup title, he was a repeat entrant to the World's Strongest Man competition.

Vidzis also competed in Mixed Martial Arts.

== Biography ==
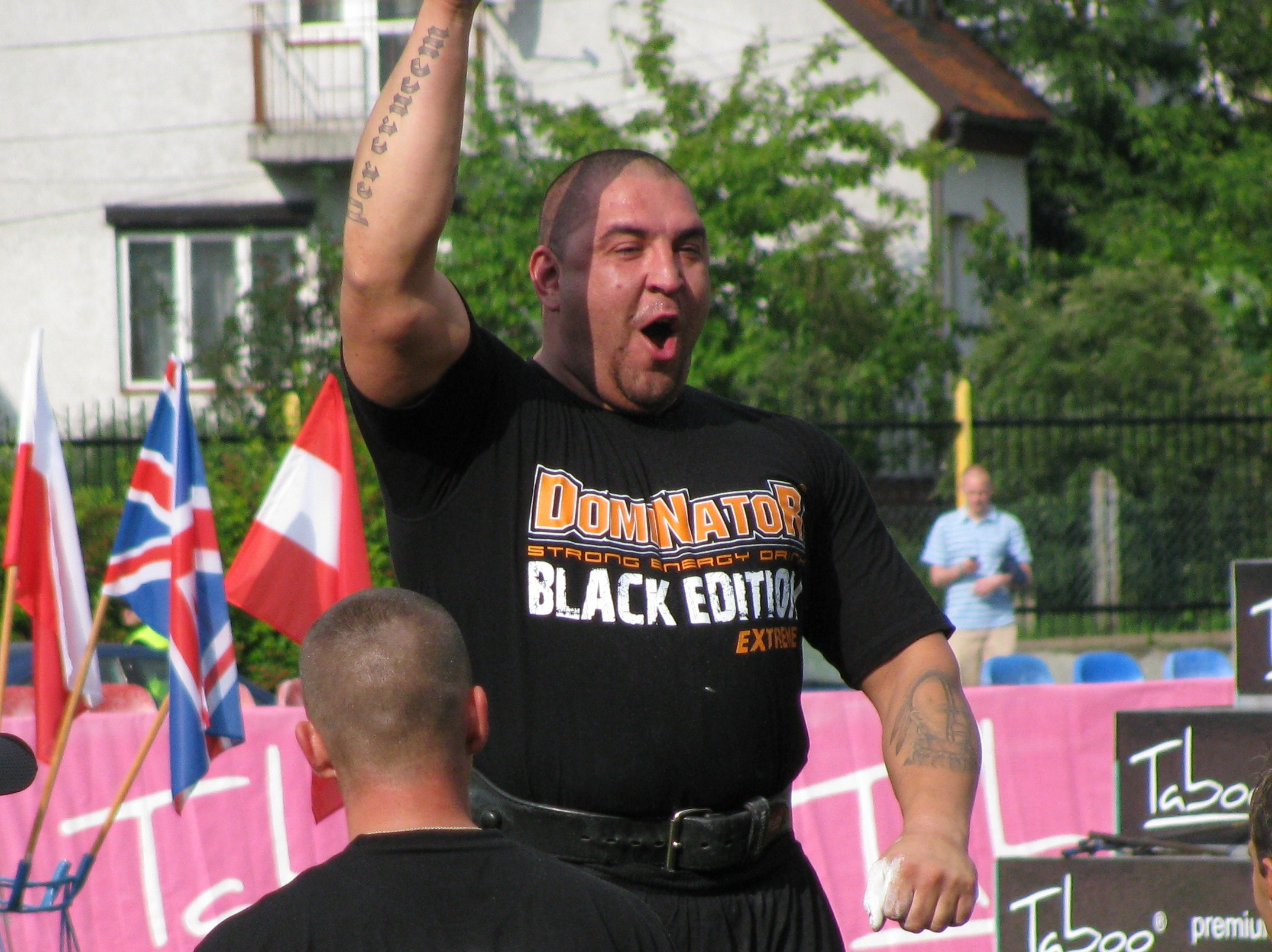
Raivis Vidzis in 2009

Vidzis won his country's strongest man title when he was just 24 year's old. He went on to dominate in Latvia for four years whilst also making a reputation on the international circuit.

In 2004 he won the overall title for the World Strongman Cup having thrown in his lot with them as opposed to the International Federation of Strength Athletes. He won it again in 2005, and made a number of appearances in the Strongman Super Series. He qualified for the 2005 World's Strongest Man competition but did not make the final. In 2006 he was invited to the 2006 World's Strongest Man where he made the final ten, finishing ninth overall. In 2007 a fourth place showing in Europe's Strongest Man was the highlight although he did make the 2007 World's Strongest Man competition but did not make the final.

Vidzis, having been so active in the now defunct World Strongman Cup, reduced his competitive activity in 2008 and 2009. He competed in the 2008 World's Strongest Man competition but again did not make the final. An appearance at the 2009 Europe's Strongest Man was the only major engagement of that year.

== Competition record ==
- 2000
  - 1. – Latvia's Strongest Man
- 2001
  - 1. – Latvia's Strongest Man
  - 7. – World's Strongest Team 2001 (with Raimonds Bergmanis)
- 2002
  - 9. – Europe's Strongest Man 2002
  - 1. – Latvia's Strongest Man
- 2003
  - 1. – Latvia's Strongest Man
- 2004
  - 2. – World Strongman Cup 2004: Edmonton
- 2005
  - 4. – Polish Giants, Łódź
  - 1. – World Strongman Cup 2005: Mińsk
  - 4. – World Strongman Cup 2005: Wexford
  - 4. – World Strongman Cup 2005: Yorkshire
  - 3. – World's Strongest Team 2005 (with Rolands Gulbis)
  - 1. – World Strongman Cup 2005: Denver
  - 5. – Strongman Super Series 2005: Malbork
  - 5. – Strongman Super Series 2005: Varberg
  - 4. – World Strongman Cup 2005: Bad Häring
  - 1. – World Strongman Cup 2005: Ladysmith
  - 5. – Europe's Strongest Man 2005
  - 5. – World Strongman Cup 2005: Nuremberg
  - 1. – World Strongman Cup 2005: Chanty-Mansyjsk
- 2006
  - 5. – Polish Giants, Łódź
  - 2. – World Strongman Cup 2006: Ryga
  - 5. – World Strongman Cup 2006: Armagh
  - 8. – Strongman Super Series 2006: Milicz
  - 2. – World Strongman Cup 2006: Mińsk
  - 2. – Poland against Europe
  - 9. – 2006 World's Strongest Man, China
  - 10. – World Strongman Cup 2006: Vienna
  - 6. – World Strongman Cup 2006: Grodzisk Mazowiecki
  - 5. – World Strongman Cup 2006: Podolsk

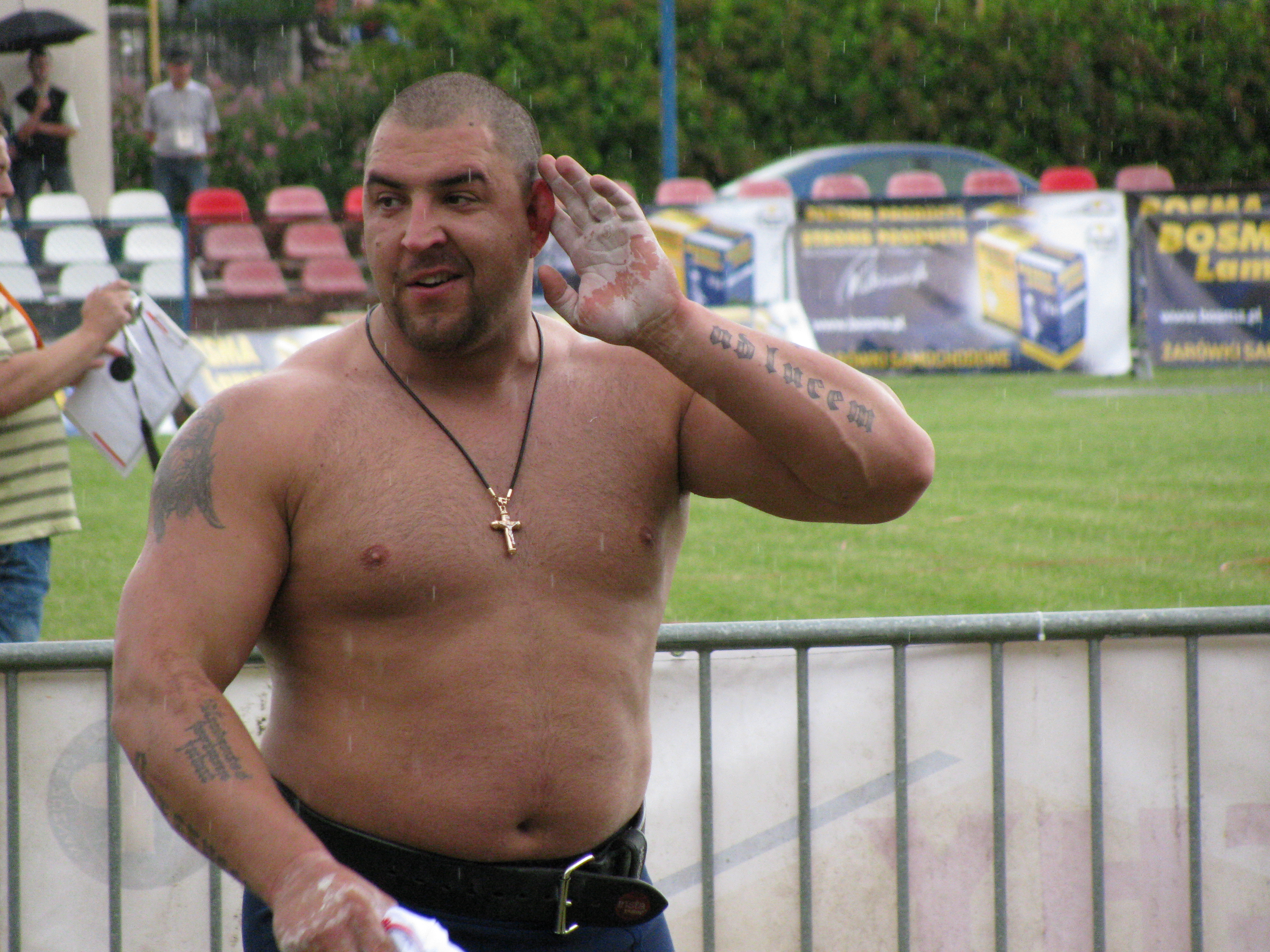
Raivis Vidzis

- 2007
  - 6. – Polish Giants, Łódź
  - 2. – World Strongman Cup 2007: Ryga
  - 4. – Europe's Strongest Man 2007
  - 6. – World Strongman Cup 2007: Dartford
  - 4. – Grand Prix of Khanty-Mansijsk (WSMC)
- 2008
  - 7. – Europe's Strongest Man 2008
  - 3. – Polish Grand Prix
  - 8. – Strongman Super Series 2008: Lysekil
- 2009
  - 8. – Europe's Strongest Man 2009

== Mixed martial arts record ==
Professional record breakdown
2 matches	2 wins	0 losses
By knockout	0	0
By submission	2	0
By decision	0	0

Res.	Record	Opponent	Method	Event	Date	Round	Time	Location	Notes
Win	2–0	(Lithuania) Julius Zurauskis	Submission (rear-naked choke)	WFCA – Fight Arena: Latvia vs. Russia	13 November 2010	1	1:56	Riga, Latvia	
Win	1–0	(Lithuania) Vadim Gridiajev	Submission (rear-naked choke)	WFCA – Cage Fight Volume 1	22 March 2009	1	1:22	Riga, Latvia	
