= Javad Molania =

Iranian actor, director, painter, photographer (born 1978)

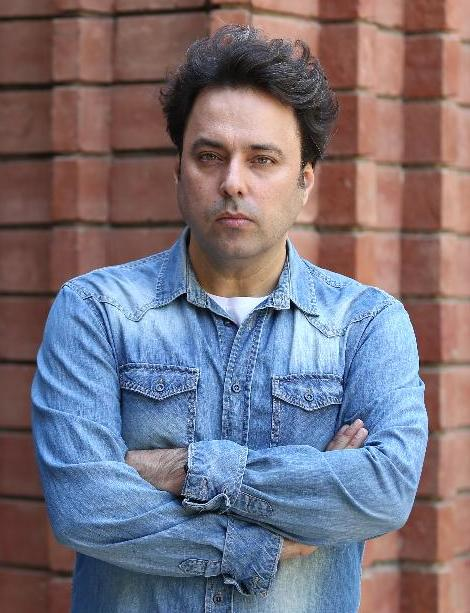
- Javad Molania
- Born: 1978 (age 47–48)
- Occupations: theater director, actor, presenter, painter, photographer

Javad Molania (born 1978) is an Iranian actor, director, presenter, photographer and painter.

He is known for his adaptations of European plays.

== Works ==
=== Theatre director ===
- A Doll's House
- Le Malentendu
- Amadeus
- Horatio

=== Actor ===
- Tweezers(2005)
- Here Tonight (2019)
- Horatio

=== Cinematographer ===
- Melody of Cradle (2013)

== See also ==
- List of cinematographers
- List of Iranian male actors
- List of Iranian painters
- List of photographers
- List of theatre directors
