= Reza Gharaei =

Iranian Strongman and powerlifter (born 1980)

Mohammad Reza Gharaei
Personal information
- Born: 1980 (age 45–46) Iran
- Occupation(s): Strongman, Powerlifter
- Height: 1.88 m (6 ft 2 in)
Medal record
Strongman
Representing Iran
World's Strongest Man
Qualified	2006 World's Strongest Man
IFSA World Open
8th	2005
Iran's Strongest Man
1st	2004 Iran's Strongest Man
1st	2007 Iran's Strongest Man
1st	2008 Iran's Strongest Man
Qualified	2010 Iran's Strongest Man

Mohammad Reza Gharaei (Persian: محمدرضا قرایی; born 1980), mostly known as Reza Gharaei, is an Iranian strongman and powerlifter.

== Strongman career ==
Reza has competed for Iran in several international strongman competitions.

Reza represented Iran in the 2006 World's Strongest Man contest, but failed reach the finals. Reza also competed in the IFSA World Open in 2005, finishing in 8th place.

Reza participated four times (2004, 2007–2008, 2010) in Iran's Strongest Man competition, winning in 2004, 2007 & 2008.

== See also ==
- 2006 World's Strongest Man
- Iran's Strongest Man
