= Mojtaba Maleki =

Iranian strongman and powerlifter

- Born: 1983 (age 41–42); Ilam, Iran
- Occupation(s): Powerlifter, Strongman
- Height: 1.83 m (6 ft 0 in)

Competition record

Strongman

Iran's Strongest Man
2nd	2001	
2nd	2004	
2nd	2005	

Competition record

Powerlifting

Representing (Iran)

World Powerlifting Championships
1st	2017	+140kg
1st	2018	+140kg

Asian Powerlifting Championships
1st	2004	+125kg
1st	2005	+125kg
1st	2006	+125kg
1st	2007	+125kg
1st	2008	+125kg
1st	2011	+120kg
1st	2013	+120kg
1st	2015	+120kg

Mojtaba Maleki (Persian: مجتبی ملکی; born 1983) is an Iranian Strongman and Powerlifter, competing for Iran in international strongman and powerlifting competitions.

He participated six times in Iran's Strongest Man competition, placing runner-up in three (2001, 2004–2005). He reached the world record of raw squat with knee wraps, 500 kg, on 21 September 2017.

== See also ==
- Iran's Strongest Man
- World Powerlifting Congress
- World Strongman Cup Federation
