= Michael Dadashi =

American entrepreneur and business executive

- Citizenship: American
- Occupation: Entrepreneur
- Known for: Founder and CEO of Infinite Recovery; Founder of MHD Enterprises
- Website: Official website Infinite Recovery website

Michael Dadashi is an American entrepreneur and business executive based in Austin, Texas, best known as the founder of MHD Enterprises and founder and CEO of Infinite Recovery.

== Early life and career ==
At age 15, Dadashi started drinking alcohol and soon became an alcoholic. Over the course of several years, he also became addicted to heroin, while occasionally using other drugs like marijuana, cocaine, Vicodin, and Adderall.

Dadashi worked at an e-waste recycling company in California. When he was fired, he returned to Austin in 2006 and founded MHD Enterprises, a similar e-waste recycling business.

In June 2009, Dadashi entered rehab and has been sober since. MHD Enterprises also began to grow, earning $7 million between 2008 and 2011. Between 2012 and 2014, the company earned a spot on the Inc. 5000 list of the fastest growing companies in the United States.

In 2014, Dadashi founded the Infinite Recovery addiction treatment network. He also co-founded a bottled water company, Heart Water.

== Advocacy work ==
Dadashi is an advocate for addiction recovery and a board member for the non-profit organization, Facing Addiction. Over one-third of the employees at MHD Enterprises are also recovering or former addicts.
