= Don Pope =

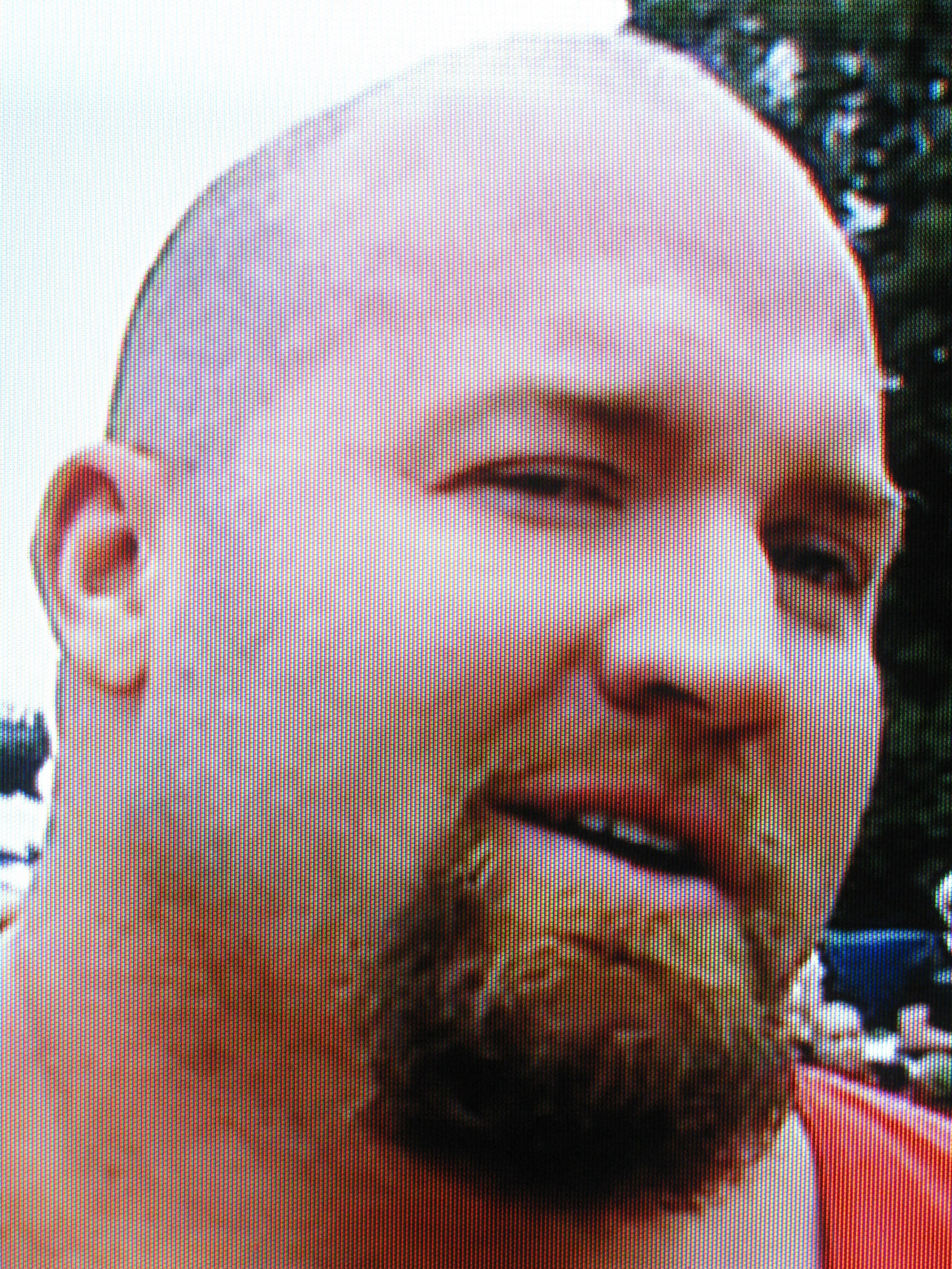

Personal information
- Born: January 10, 1972 (age 54) North Ridgeville, Ohio
- Occupation: Strongman Runs Pope Fitness in North Ridgeville Ohio
- Height: 6 ft 4 in (1.93 m)
Medal record
Strongman
Representing United States
World's Strongest Man
Qualified	2003 World's Strongest Man
8th	2005 World's Strongest Man
3rd	2006 World's Strongest Man
9th	2007 World's Strongest Man
Strongman Super Series
3rd	2005 Mohegan Sun Grand Prix

Don Pope (born January 10, 1972) from North Ridgeville, Ohio is an American former strongman competitor. He is best known for participating in the World's Strongest Man finals of 2005, 2006 and 2007. His best finish was 3rd at the 2006 World's Strongest Man competition. Don has a maximum dead lift of 800 pounds (363 kg), and can squat nearly 1000 pounds (450 kg). He is also a school teacher by trade.
