= Tarmo Mitt =

Estonian strongman

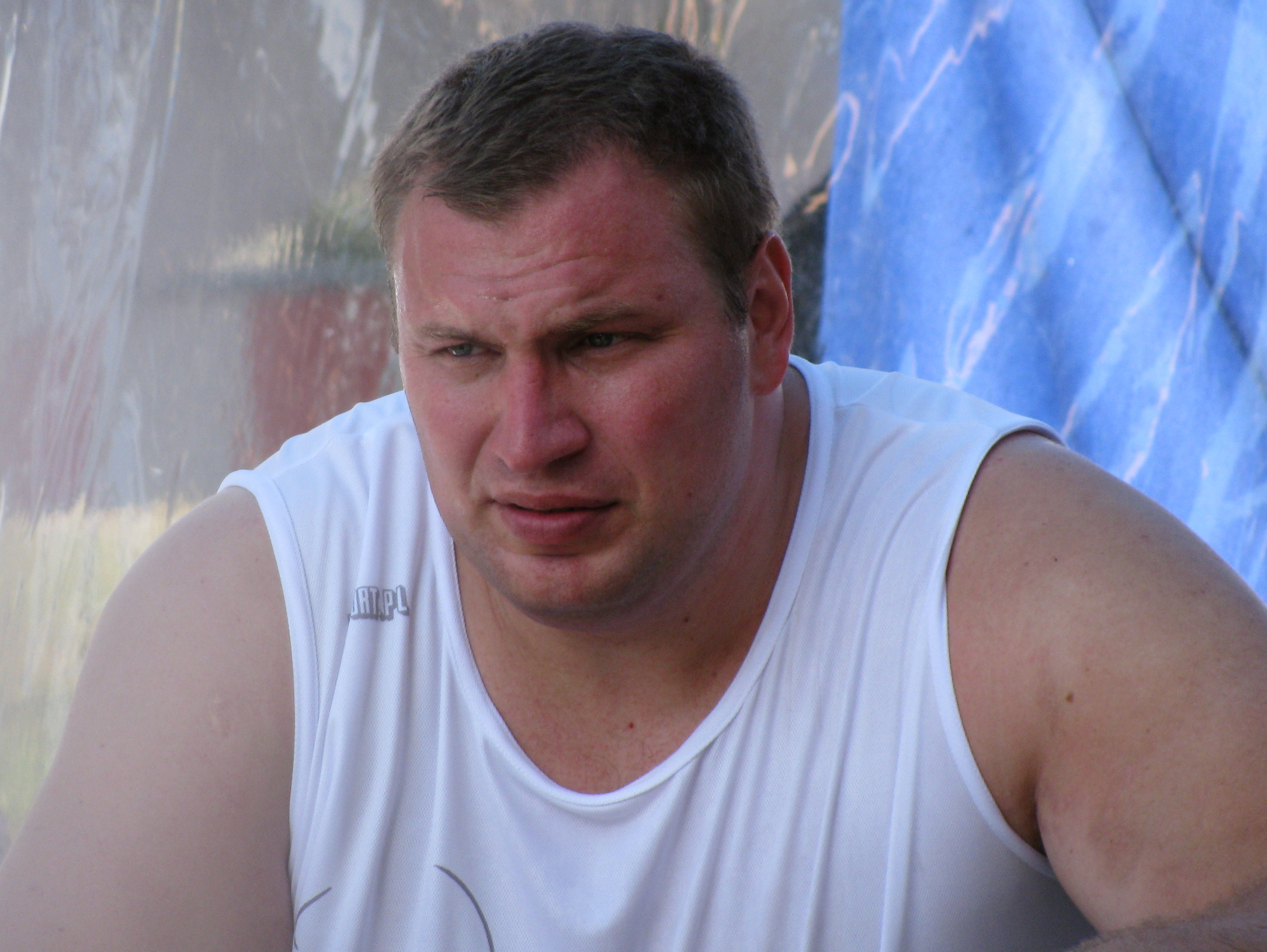
- Born: 22 May 1977 (age 49); Tartu, then part of Estonian SSR, Soviet Union
- Other name: "The Mountain"
- Occupation: Strongman
- Height: 6 ft 4.5 in (1.94 m)

Competition record
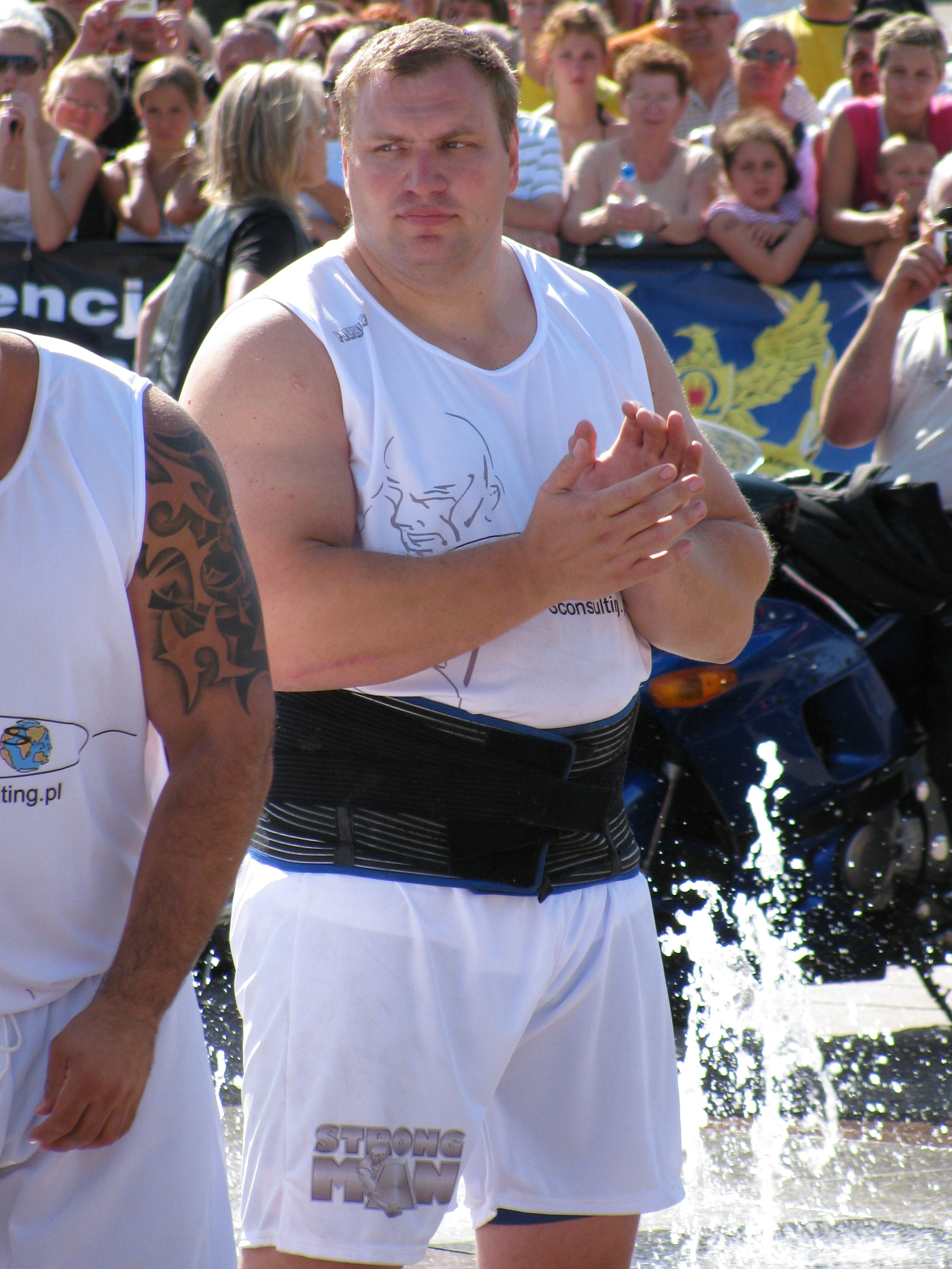
- Tarmo Mitt

Strongman

Representing Estonia

World's Strongest Man
| 6th | 2005 World's Strongest Man |
| 5th | 2006 World's Strongest Man |
| 10th | 2007 World's Strongest Man |
| 7th | 2008 World's Strongest Man |

World Strongman Cup
| 3rd | Overall World Strongman Cup 2005 |
| 2nd | Overall World Strongman Cup 2006 |
| 3rd | Latvia 2007 |

World Strongman Federation
| 1st | belAZ Strongman Cup 2010 |
| 1st | Asian World Cup 2011 |
| 2nd | WSF World Cup Latvia 2011 |
| 1st | WSF World Cup Belarus 2011 |
| 1st | belAZ Strongman Cup 2011 |

WSF World Team Cup
| 1st | WSF World Team Cup: Stage 2 2011 w/Evgeny Shcherbakov |

Strongman Super Series
| 2nd | 2008 Sweden Super Series |

Estonia's Strongest Man
| 1st | 1999 |
| 1st | 2000 |
| 1st | 2001 |
| 3rd | 2002 |
| 1st | 2003 |
| 1st | 2004 |
| 3rd | 2009 |

Estonian Tartu Strongman Open
| 1st | 2010 |

Ultimate Strongman Masters World Championship
| 2nd | 2017 |
| 6th | 2018 |

Tarmo Mitt (born 22 May 1977) is an Estonian professional strongman competitor.

He was a regular entrant to the World's Strongest Man competition, and was a finalist, finishing in the top ten four consecutive years from 2005 to 2008.

== Strongman career ==
Mitt was 20 when he started training and competing in strongman competitions and within 2 years had won his national championships. By 2005 he had become recognised as one of the world's leading competitors with podium finishes in the World Strongman Cup happening regularly. He was invited to the World's Strongest Man finals and made the final in 2005. Despite being in the WSM final on four consecutive occasions from 2005 to 2008, he did not make the starting line-up for the 2009 event, instead being given the first reserve spot. He counts this as his biggest disappointment whilst training as a strongman. In the 2007 final he tore his biceps and this led to his tenth place, although he was still in the final.

Tarmo won stage 3 of the WSF World Cup held in Minsk, Belarus on September 10, 2011. Tarmo also won the Estonian Tartu Strongman Open on November 27, 2010. He is the father of prominent Estonian basketball player Arnold Mitt.

== Personal records ==
- Squat – 320 kg (705 lb)
- Bench press – 225 kg (496 lb)
- Deadlift – 335 kg (739 lb)
- Keg toss – 15 kg (33 lb) x 5 kegs over 6.00 metres (19 ft 8 in) in 31.59 seconds (2008 Strongman Super Series Sweden Grand Prix) (World Record)
- Pillars of Hercules (Hercules hold) – 200 kg (441 lb) in each hand for 71.12 seconds (2005 World's Strongest Man) (former world record)
- Power Medley – 100 kg (220 lb) cannonball carry for 20m course and 227 kg (500 lb) sled drag for 20m course in 26.15 seconds (2006 World's Strongest Man, group 4) (World Record)
