= World Strongman Cup Federation =

- Formation: 2004
- Type: Sports federation
- Headquarters: Salzburg, Austria
- Website: world-strongmancup.at

The World Strongman Cup Federation ("WSCF") was a worldwide organisation within strength athletics that claimed to be the sport's organising body with the aim of making "the Strongman Sport more popular and accessible for a wide range of the people." Its motto was "be strong". It was also a charity. The Federation organised the World Strongman Cup one of the main competitions in the field of strength athletics boasting participation from some of the foremost strongmen around the globe. It was a separate competition from the World's Strongest Man, the Strongman Super Series (producing a World Champion) and the IFSA World Championship). It has since been replaced by the World Strongman Federation's World Cup.

== History ==
Until completion of the 2004 World's Strongest Man competition, the IFSA managed the annual World's Strongest Man contest. However, that year saw an acrimonious dividing of the sport with the IFSA forming its own competition and with the World's Strongest Man ("WSM") continuing to be organised by TWI, an IMG Media company. The WSM itself was never a federation, but an event organised commercially. When the IFSA formed their own competition and banned their contracted athletes from competing in the WSM, the World Strongman Cup Federation ("WSCF") filled a void and signed up many of the non-IFSA athletes. At the 2005 WSM finals, two thirds of the athletes were under contract with the WSCF. Since its inception the WSMCF has organised events in many countries including: United States of America, Canada, Germany, Austria, Russia, Serbia, Poland and Spain. Its flagship event was the World Strongman Cup.

Following a financial dispute with the World Strongman Cup Federation Vlad Redkin, one of its chief organisers, left to found the World Strongman Federation. Following Vlad's departure, the WSCF ceased to promote events and effectively disappeared from the strength athletics landscape. In September 2007 an event in Khanty-Mansijsk formerly affiliated to WSMC and featuring its athletes was promoted by Vlad Redkin. This event had its name changed at short notice from WSMC to the Grand Prix of Khanty-Mansijsk (Russia) and in effect was the first WSF event. The reason given after the competition by Redkin was that a combination of financial reasons as well as concerns over WSMCF's stated aim of forming closer ties with the International Federation of Strength Athletes led him to part company with WSMCF. He initially planned to cooperate closely with the World Strongman Super Series in 2008, but in fact set up a new federation called the World Strongman Federation.

World Strongman Cup
- The official logo of World Strongman Cup Federation

Tournament information
- Location: Varies The cup is won through a series of competitions held throughout the world
- Established: 2004
- Final year: 2007
- Format: A number of Multi-event competitions within an annual tour

Final champion
- (Poland) Mariusz Pudzianowski

== World Strongman Cup ==
The World Strongman Cup has been run since 2004. It is organised as a tour event with many competitions held throughout the globe. The overall winner is ascertained through the cumulation of points scored across the season.

=== List of Champions ===
Year	Athlete	Nationality
2004	Raivis Vidzis	Latvia
2005	Raivis Vidzis	Latvia
2006	Mariusz Pudzianowski	Poland
2007	Mariusz Pudzianowski	Poland

=== 2004 ===
Name and Location	Champion	Runner-up	3rd place	Date
Gran Canaria, Spain Strongman Cup Spain	(Ukraine) Mykhailo Starov	(Latvia) Raivis Vidzis	(Austria) Ralf Ber	28 February 2004
Villach, Austria Strongman Cup Kärtnen	(Northern Ireland) Glenn Ross	(Latvia) Raivis Vidzis	(Austria) Ralf Ber	3 April 2004
Immenstadt, Germany Strongman Cup Immenstadt	(Russia) Igor Pedan	(Northern Ireland) Glenn Ross	(Latvia) Raivis Vidzis	22 May 2004
Plattling, Germany Strongman Cup Plattling-Luna Park	(Austria) Ralf Ber	(Ukraine) Mykhailo Starov	(Latvia) Raivis Vidzis	26 June 2004
Bad Häring, Austria Strongman Cup Bad Häring	(Russia) Igor Pedan	(Northern Ireland) Glenn Ross	(Latvia) Raivis Vidzis	10 July 2004
Świnoujście, Poland Strongman Cup Poland	(Latvia) Raivis Vidzis	(Russia) Igor Pedan	(Austria) Ralf Ber	31 July 2004
Subotica, Serbia European Masters Strongman Cup	(Northern Ireland) Glenn Ross	(Latvia) Raivis Vidzis	(Austria) Ralf Ber	4 September 2004
Moscow, Russia Strongman Cup Russia	(Ukraine) Mykhailo Starov	(Russia) Igor Pedan	(Latvia) Raivis Vidzis	2 October 2004
Edmonton, Canada Strongman Cup Canada	(United States) Dave Ostlund	(Latvia) Raivis Vidzis	(Austria) Ralf Ber	11 December 2004
Overall placings	(Latvia) Raivis Vidzis			

=== 2005 ===
Name and Location	Champion	Runner-up	3rd place	Date
Minsk, Belarus Strongman Cup Belarus	(Latvia) Raivis Vidzis	(Austria) Ralf Ber	(Lithuania) Antanas Abrutis	7 May 2005
(Republic of Ireland) Wexford, Ireland Strongman Cup Ireland	(Lithuania) Antanas Abrutis	(Estonia) Tarmo Mitt	(Northern Ireland) Glenn Ross	21 May 2005
Wakefield, England Strongman Cup England	(Northern Ireland) Glenn Ross	(Northern Ireland) Brian Irwin	(United States) Jesse Marunde	5 June 2005
Denver, Colorado, United States Strongman Cup USA	(Latvia) Raivis Vidzis	(Northern Ireland) Glenn Ross	(Austria) Ralf Ber	2 July 2005
Bad Häring, Austria Strongman Cup Austria	(Poland) Mariusz Pudzianowski	(Ukraine) Mykhailo Starov	(Austria) Ralf Ber	6 August 2005
Ladysmith, Canada Strongman Cup Canada	(Latvia) Raivis Vidzis	(Austria) Ralf Ber	(Canada) Ed Brost	28 August 2005
Nuremberg, Germany Strongman Cup Germany	(Germany) Franz Beil	(Austria) Ralf Ber	(Ukraine) Mykhailo Starov	18 September 2005
Khanty-Mansiysk, Russia Strongman Cup Russia	(Latvia) Raivis Vidzis	(United States) Jesse Marunde	(Russia) Elbrus Nigmatullin	17 December 2005
Overall placings	(Latvia) Raivis Vidzis	(Austria) Ralf Ber	(Estonia) Tarmo Mitt	

=== 2006 ===
Name and Location	Champion	Runner-up	3rd place	Date
Riga, Latvia Strongman Cup Latvia	(Poland) Mariusz Pudzianowski	(Latvia) Raivis Vidzis	(Russia) Elbrus Nigmatullin	6 May 2006
Armagh, Northern Ireland Strongman Cup Northern Ireland	(Austria) Ralf Ber	(Northern Ireland) Glenn Ross	(Estonia) Tarmo Mitt	27 May 2006
Minsk, Belarus Strongman Cup Belarus	(Poland) Mariusz Pudzianowski	(Latvia) Raivis Vidzis	(Russia) Elbrus Nigmatullin	17 June 2006
Fürstenfeldbruck, Germany Strongman Cup Germany	(Poland) Jarek Dymek	(Ukraine) Mykhailo Starov	(Estonia) Tarmo Mitt	1 July 2006
Moscow, Russia Strongman Cup Moscow	(Poland) Mariusz Pudzianowski	(Finland) Janne Virtanen	(Russia) Elbrus Nigmatullin	31 July 2006
Vienna, Austria Strongman Cup Austria	(Bulgaria) Stoyan Todorchev	(Ukraine) Vasyl Virastiuk	(Serbia) Ervin Katona	22 October 2006
Grodzisk Mazowiecki, Poland Strongman Cup Poland	(Poland) Mariusz Pudzianowski	(Poland) Sebastian Wenta	(Bulgaria) Stoyan Todorchev	25 November 2006
Podolsk, Russia Strongman Cup Russia	(Poland) Mariusz Pudzianowski	(Russia) Elbrus Nigmatullin	(Bulgaria) Stoyan Todorchev	16 December 2006
Overall placings	(Poland) Mariusz Pudzianowski	(Estonia) Tarmo Mitt	(Russia) Elbrus Nigmatullin	

=== 2007 ===
Name and Location	Champion	Runner-up	3rd place	Date
Riga, Latvia Strongman Cup Latvia	(Poland) Mariusz Pudzianowski	(Latvia) Raivis Vidzis	(Estonia) Tarmo Mitt	13 May 2007
Moscow, Russia Strongman Cup Moscow	(Finland) Janne Virtanen	(Bulgaria) Stoyan Todorchev	(Australia) Derek Boyer	1 July 2007
Dartford, England Strongman Cup England	(Poland) Mariusz Pudzianowski	(Bulgaria) Stoyan Todorchev	(United Kingdom) Terry Hollands	22 July 2007
Khanty-Mansiysk, Russia Grand Prix of Khanty-Mansiysk	(Bulgaria) Stoyan Todorchev	(Estonia) Tarmo Mitt	(Russia) Elbrus Nigmatullin	8 September 2007
Overall placings	(Poland) Mariusz Pudzianowski	(Bulgaria) Stoyan Todorchev	(Latvia) Raivis Vidzis	

== Charity ==
The charity aims to reduce and tackle obesity in children by helping more children to take part in sporting activities. It is the charity's belief that "As these children become more interested in and able to enjoy sports of their choosing, their physical and emotional conditions show significant improvement. This provides a strong foundation for improved self-confidence and happiness for all participants." The federation believes that their athletes can act as positive examples.
