= Jessen Paulin =

Canadian Strongman (born 1974)

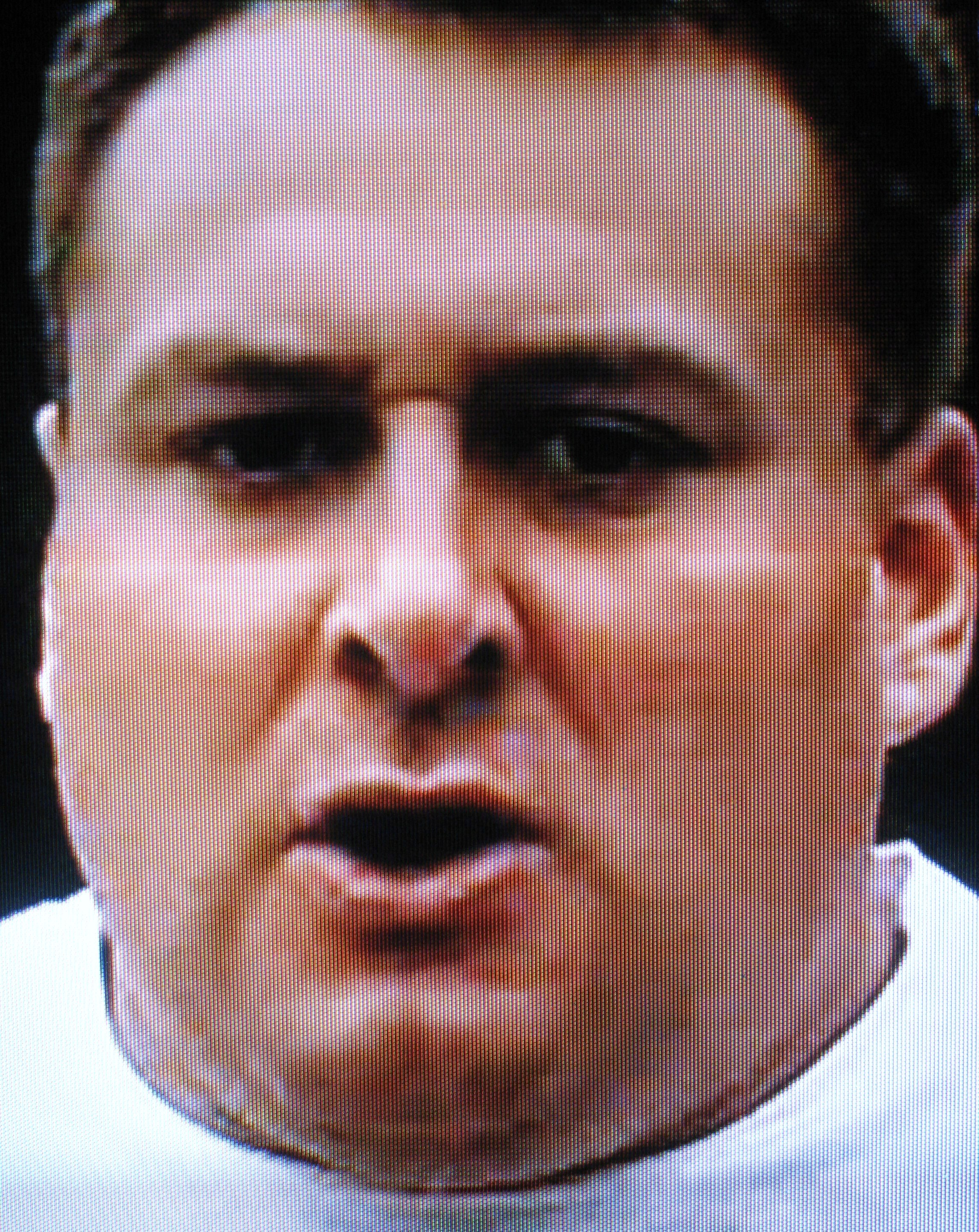

Personal information
- Born: May 29, 1974 (age 52) Senneterre, Quebec, Canada
- Occupation: Strongman
- Height: 6 ft 2 in (1.88 m)
Medal record
Strongman
Representing Canada
World's Strongest Man
Qualified	2002 World's Strongest Man
8th	2003 World's Strongest Man
Qualified	2005 World's Strongest Man
Qualified	2006 World's Strongest Man
Canada's Strongest Man
9th	1999
2nd	2000
3rd	2001
2nd	2002
2nd	2003
2nd	2004
1st	2005
1st	2006
2nd	2007
5th	2008
North America's Strongest Man
1st	2007
1st	2008
Quebec's Strongest Man
1st	2000
1st	2001
1st	2002
2nd	2003
1st	2004
1st	2005
1st	2006

Jessen Paulin (born May 29, 1974) is a Canadian Strongman. A resident of Gatineau, Quebec, Paulin is known for being a multiple-Quebec's Strongest Man champion and a two-time Canada's Strongest Man in 2005 and 2006 succeeding, multiple-time champion and former World Champion Hugo Girard who was in rehabilitation following a surgery on an injured foot. In 2007, he was crowned the North America's Strongest Man, an event that featured six Canadian and six American strongman athletes. Jessen won this title again in 2008.

Paulin first entered the Canadian Strongmen spotlight in 1999 in which he first reached the Canada's Strongest Man finals and finished in 9th place. Paulin received most of his training with the help of Girard and often shared the same training routine. It was in 2002, that Paulin first reached the World Stage by finishing second in Canada's Strongest Man and repeated the same feat in 2003 and 2004. In 2003, Jessen qualified for the finals for the first and only time at the World's Strongest Man competition, eventually finishing in 8th place.

In 2004, Girard suffered a major foot injury which kept him sidelined from the main competition for nearly two years. Paulin took advantage of Girard's absence in 2005 to become Canada's Strongest Man for the first time and reaching the world stage for the third time in four years. However, Paulin did not reach the Grand Finals of the competition.

In 2006, after successfully defending the Canadian crown, Paulin participated for the fourth time in the World Strongest's Man Competition held in China but finished in 5th position of his group during the first round. His group included former World's Strongest Man Mariusz Pudzianowski.

In 2007, after finishing second behind Dominic Filiou in Canada's Strongest Man, Paulin qualified for the World's Strongest Man competition for the third year in a row and fifth time in six years after winning the North America's Strongest Man competition which was held in his hometown during the Gatineau Hot Air Balloon Festival. Paulin, finished ahead of American competitor Brian Shaw by way of a tie-breaker after both finished the competition with 83 points In that event, Hugo Girard who attempted a comeback withdrew from the competition due to another injury.

Jessen was scheduled to compete at the 2008 inaugural Fortissimus strongman event, but withdrew and officially retired from international strongman competition.

== Personal records ==
- Wheelbarrow push – 1,077 kg (2,374 lb) for 22 ft 8 in (2003 Strongman Super Series Canada Grand Prix) (World Record)

== Body Profile ==
- Weight: 315 pounds (143 kg)
- Height: 1.88 m (6 ft 2 in)
- Chest: 120 cm
- Biceps: 45 cm
