= Strength athletics in Canada =

Various strongman events throughout Canada

Strength athletics in Canada refers to the various Strongman events throughout Canada and its provinces in the sport of Strength athletics in association with the World's Strongest Man. The roots of strongman in Canada go back long before the birth of WSM in 1977, particularly with Louis Cyr in the early 1900s, who was deemed the "Strongest Man on Earth" during his lifetime. Four Canadian athletes have finished on the podium, placing 2nd in 1982 with Tom Magee and 3rd in 2005 with Dominic Filiou, Jean-François Caron placing 3rd in 2020, and Maxime Boudreault placing 3rd in 2021. The provinces of Canada hold annual championships with the top 2-4 athletes going on to the National Championships at the end of the year to crown Canada's Strongest Man. Mitchell Hooper's win at 2023 World's Strongest Man makes him the first Canadian to finish in first place.

== National Competitions ==
=== Canada's Strongest Man ===
Canada's Strongest Man
Tournament information
- Location: Canada
- Established: 1982
- Format: Multi-event competition

Current champion
- (Saskatchewan) Tristain Hoath (2025)

Canada's Strongest Man is an annual strongman competition held in Canada, and features exclusively Canadian athletes. The event first started in 1982, with Tom Magee winning the first 2 titles. Hugo Girard would later go on to win a record 6 titles; a record that would later be beaten despite Hugo's proclamation that nobody would ever even go as far as to match it. After Hugo withdrew from competition due to injuries, fellow training partner and 5 time runner-up Jessen Paulin won in 2005 & 2006. Dominic Filiou won in 2007, becoming the first man to defeat Hugo Girard on Canadian soil. After the dust had settled following the end of Hugo's era, a new champion would emerge: Jean-Francois Caron. Jean-Francois, or "J-F", has dominated strongman in Canada since 2011, winning the title of Canada's Strongest Man every year and ushering in a new era of Strongman in Canada. J-F has also nurtured the success of other athletes and has worked towards developing the success of the sport in the country as a whole.

==== Champions breakdown ====
Year	Champion	Runner-up	3rd place	Location
1982	(Manitoba) Tom Magee	(To be confirmed)	(To be confirmed)	
1983	(Manitoba) Tom Magee (2)	(To be confirmed)	(To be confirmed)	
1984	Event not held			
1985	Event not held			
1986	(Canada) Dusko Markovich	(To be confirmed)	(To be confirmed)	
1987	(Canada) Robert Dubeau	(Quebec) Marco Fortier	(Canada) Ken Fisher	
1988	(Manitoba) Tom Magee (3)	(To be confirmed)	(To be confirmed)	
1989	Event not held			
1990	(Nova Scotia) Gregg Ernst	(To be confirmed)	(To be confirmed)	
1991	(Nova Scotia) Gregg Ernst (2)	(To be confirmed)	(To be confirmed)	
1992	Event not held			
1993	(Canada) Chuck Haase	(To be confirmed)	(To be confirmed)	
1994	(Quebec) Ron Trottier	(To be confirmed)	(To be confirmed)	
1995	(Canada) Robert Ploughman	(To be confirmed)	(To be confirmed)	
1996	Event not held			
1997	(Quebec) Ginaud Dupuis	(To be confirmed)	(To be confirmed)	
1998	Event not held			
1999	(Quebec) Hugo Girard	(British Columbia) Ed Brost	(Quebec) Ginaud Dupuis	Quebec, Canada
2000	(Quebec) Hugo Girard (2)	(Quebec) Jessen Paulin	(Alberta) Geoff Dolan	Quebec, Canada
2001	(Quebec) Hugo Girard (3)	(Ontario) Travis Lyndon	(Quebec) Jessen Paulin	Dolbeau-Mistassini, Quebec
2002	(Quebec) Hugo Girard (4)	(Quebec) Jessen Paulin	(Ontario) Travis Lyndon	North Bay, Ontario
2003	(Quebec) Hugo Girard (5)	(Quebec) Jessen Paulin	(Saskatchewan) Geoff Dolan	Saint-Jean-de-Matha, Quebec
2004	(Quebec) Hugo Girard (6)	(Quebec) Jessen Paulin	(Ontario) Travis Lyndon	Gatineau, Quebec
2005	(Quebec) Jessen Paulin	(Ontario) Travis Lyndon	(Quebec) Dominic Filiou	Gatineau, Quebec
2006	(Quebec) Jessen Paulin (2)	(Quebec) Dominic Filiou	(Quebec) Louis-Philippe Jean	Gatineau, Quebec
2007	(Quebec) Dominic Filiou	(Quebec) Jessen Paulin	(Quebec) Hugo Girard	Gatineau, Quebec
2008	(Quebec) Louis-Philippe Jean	(Quebec) Jean-François Caron	(Quebec) Christian Savoie	Gatineau, Quebec
2009	(Quebec) Christian Savoie	(Quebec) Louis-Philippe Jean	(Quebec) Jean-François Caron	Quebec City, Quebec
2010	(Quebec) Christian Savoie (2)	(Quebec) Jean-François Caron	(Saskatchewan) Scott Cummine	Quebec City, Quebec
2011	(Quebec) Jean-François Caron	(Quebec) Christian Savoie	(Saskatchewan) Scott Cummine	Quebec City, Quebec
2012	(Quebec) Jean-François Caron (2)	(Quebec) Christian Savoie	(Saskatchewan) Scott Cummine	Quebec City, Quebec
2013	(Quebec) Jean-François Caron (3)	(Quebec) Christian Savoie	(Ontario) Ben Ruckstuhl	Quebec City, Quebec
2014	(Quebec) Jean-François Caron (4)	(Quebec) Simon Boudreau	(Ontario) Ben Ruckstuhl	Quebec City, Quebec
2015	(Quebec) Jean-François Caron (5)	(Ontario) Maxime Boudreault	(Quebec) Simon Boudreau	Dubreuilville, Ontario
2016	(Quebec) Jean-François Caron (6)	(Quebec) Jimmy Paquet	(Quebec) Vincent Lapointe	Dubreuilville, Ontario
2017	(Quebec) Jean-François Caron (7)	(Quebec) Jimmy Paquet	(Ontario) Karl Hjelholt	Plantagenet, Ontario
2018	(Quebec) Jean-François Caron (8)	(Quebec) Jimmy Paquet	(Ontario) Maxime Boudreault	Plantagenet, Ontario
2019	(Quebec) Jean-François Caron (9)	(Ontario) Karl Hjelholt	(Quebec) Jimmy Paquet	Plantagenet, Ontario
2020	Event not held			
2021	(Quebec) Gabriel Rhéaume	(Ontario) Wesley Derwinsky	(British Columbia) Sean Hayes	Sainte-Anne-de-Beaupré, Québec
2022	(Ontario) Maxime Boudreault	(Quebec) Gabriel Rhéaume	(Ontario) Wesley Derwinsky	Sainte-Anne-de-Beaupré, Québec
2023	(Quebec) Simon Pratte	(New Brunswick) Joey Lavallee	(Quebec) Fredrick Rhéaume	Sainte-Anne-de-Beaupré, Québec
2024	(Quebec) Gabriel Rhéaume (2)	(Saskatchewan) James Jeffers	(Ontario) Wesley Derwinsky	Saint-Pamphile, Quebec
2025	(Saskatchewan) Tristain Hoath	(Saskatchewan) James Jeffers	(Quebec) Gabriel Rhéaume	Saint-Pamphile, Quebec
2026	(Saskatchewan) Tristain Hoath (2)	(Ontario) Maxime Boudreault	(Alberta) Larson Hehr	Saint-Pamphile, Quebec

==== Repeat champions ====
Champion	Times	Years
(Quebec) Jean-François Caron	9	2011, 2012, 2013, 2014, 2015, 2016, 2017, 2018, 2019
(Quebec) Hugo Girard	6	1999, 2000, 2001, 2002, 2003, 2004
(Manitoba) Tom Magee	3	1982, 1983, 1988
(Nova Scotia) Gregg Ernst	2	1990, 1991
(Quebec) Jessen Paulin	2	2005, 2006
(Quebec) Christian Savoie	2	2009, 2010
(Quebec) Gabriel Rhéaume	2	2021, 2024
(Saskatchewan) Tristain Hoath	2	2025, 2026

=== Quebec's Strongest Man ===
Year	Champion	Runner-up	3rd place	Location
1999	(Canada) Ron Trottier	(Canada) Ginaud Dupuis	(Quebec) Jessen Paulin	Dolbeau-Mistassini, Quebec
2000	(Quebec) Jessen Paulin	(Canada) Dominic Filiou	(Canada) Ginaud Dupuis	Dolbeau-Mistassini, Quebec
2001	(Quebec) Jessen Paulin	(Canada) Martin Brisebois	(Canada) Dominic Filiou	Lac-Etchemin, Quebec
2002	(Quebec) Jessen Paulin	(Canada) Steve Bourgeois	(Canada) Dominic Filiou	Baie-Comeau, Quebec
2003	(Canada) Dominic Filiou	(Quebec) Jessen Paulin	(Canada) Franky Bonneau	Gatineau, Quebec
2004	(Quebec) Jessen Paulin	(Canada) Yannick Normandin	(Canada) Steve Bourgeois	Mont-Joli, Quebec
2005	(Quebec) Jessen Paulin	(Canada) Dominic Filiou	(Canada) Steve Bourgeois	Dolbeau-Mistassini, Quebec
2006	(Quebec) Jessen Paulin	(Canada) Dominic Filiou	(Quebec) Louis-Phillipe Jean	Quebec
2007	(Canada) Dominic Filiou	(Quebec) Jessen Paulin	(Quebec) Louis-Phillipe Jean	Quebec
2008	(Quebec) Hugo Girard	(Quebec) Christian Savoie	(Quebec) Jessen Paulin	Quebec
2009	(Quebec) Christian Savoie	(Quebec) Jean-François Caron	(Canada) Franky Bonneau	Quebec
2010	(Quebec) Christian Savoie	(Quebec) Jean-François Caron	(To be confirmed)	Warwick, Quebec
2011	(Quebec) Jean-François Caron	(Quebec) Christian Savoie	(To be confirmed)	Warwick, Quebec
2012	(Quebec) Christian Savoie	(Quebec) Jean-François Caron	(To be confirmed)	Warwick, Quebec
2013	(Quebec) Jean-François Caron	(Quebec) Christian Savoie	(To be confirmed)	Warwick, Quebec

=== Ontario's Strongest Man ===
Year	Champion	Runner-up	3rd place	Location
2000	(Canada) Travis Lyndon	(Canada) Jamie Aszmies	(Canada) Rob Verkest	London, Ontario
2001	(Canada) Travis Lyndon	(Canada) Jamie Aszmies	(Canada) Chris Ronzon	London, Ontario
2002	(Canada) Mark Lozer	(Canada) Ryan Green	(Canada) Travis Lyndon	Hawkesbury, Ontario
2003	(Canada) Travis Lyndon	(Canada) Ryan Green	(Canada) Steve Lozer	Ottawa, Ontario
2004	(Canada) Travis Lyndon	(Canada) Ryan Green	(Canada) Jamie Aszmies	Kitchener, Ontario
2005	(Canada) Travis Lyndon	(Canada) Mike Bade	(Canada) Joe Montgomery	North Bay, Ontario
2006	(Canada) Travis Lyndon	(Canada) Joe Montgomery	(Canada) Sean Bates	Port Stanley, Ontario
2007	(Canada) Joe Montgomery	(Canada) John Dungey	(Canada) Len Elliott	Ottawa, Ontario
2008	(Canada) Jose Plante	(Canada) Paul Vaillancourt	(Canada) Len Elliott	Wawa, Ontario
2009	(Canada) Paul Vaillancourt	(Canada) John Dungey	(Ontario) Luke Skaarup	Kitchener, Ontario
2010	(Canada) Paul Vaillancourt	(Canada) Eric Rautenberg	(Ontario) Luke Skaarup	Cornwall, Ontario
2011	(Canada) Paul Vaillancourt	(Canada) Kyle Rayner	(Canada) Karl Hjelholt	Toronto, Ontario
2012	(Ontario) Luke Skaarup	(Canada) Kyle Rayner	(Canada) David Droeske	Kitchener, Ontario
2013	(Canada) Ben Ruckstuhl	(Canada) Kyle Rayner	(Ontario) Maxime Boudreault	Thunder Bay, Ontario
2014	(Ontario) Luke Skaarup	(Canada) Ben Ruckstuhl	(Canada) Paul Vaillancourt	Thunder Bay, Ontario
2015	(Canada) Ben Ruckstuhl	(Ontario) Luke Skaarup	(Ontario) Maxime Boudreault	Toronto, Ontario
2016	(Canada) Paul Vaillancourt	(Canada) Karl Hjelholt	(Canada) David Jennings	Trenton, Ontario
2017	(Ontario) Maxime Boudreault	(Canada) Karl Hjelholt	(Canada) Kyle Rayner	Trenton, Ontario
2018	(Ontario) Maxime Boudreault	(Canada) Karl Hjelholt	(Canada) Ben Ruckstuhl	Trenton, Ontario
2019	(Ontario) Maxime Boudreault	(Canada) Karl Hjelholt	(Canada) Ben Ruckstuhl	Kapuskasing, Ontario

=== Western Canada's Strongest Man ===
Year	Champion	Runner-up	3rd place	Location
2000	(Alberta) Grant McReynolds	(Alberta) Geoff Dolan	(Alberta) Beerd Beekman	
2001	(Alberta) Beerd Beekman	(Alberta) Geoff Dolan	(Alberta) Ed Brost	Calgary, Alberta
2002	(Alberta) Geoff Dolan	(Saskatchewan) Maurice Paquette	(Alberta) Cory Gillespie	Saskatoon, SK
2003	(Saskatchewan) Geoff Dolan	(Saskatchewan) Alan Block	(Saskatchewan) Brad Provick	Fort Qu'Appelle, SK
2004	(Saskatchewan) Brad Provick	(Saskatchewan) Geoff Dolan	(Manitoba) Gino Castonguay	Winnipeg, Manitoba
2005	(Saskatchewan) Alan Block	(Saskatchewan) Chris Colonval	(British Columbia) Ed Brost	Edmonton, Alberta
2006	(Saskatchewan) Scott Cummine	(Saskatchewan) Al Block	(Saskatchewan) Chris Colonval	Regina, SK
2007	(Saskatchewan) Chris Colonval	(Saskatchewan) Scott Cummine	(British Columbia) Matt Parkes	Regina, SK
2008	(British Columbia) Matt Parkes	(Saskatchewan) Scott Cummine	(Saskatchewan) Alan Block	British Columbia
2009	(Saskatchewan) Scott Cummine	(British Columbia) Jon Moerike	(Saskatchewan) Maurice Paquette	Altona, Manitoba
2010	(Saskatchewan) Scott Cummine	(Saskatchewan) Brad Provick	(Saskatchewan) Maurice Paquette	Saskatoon, SK
2011	(Saskatchewan) Scott Cummine	(Saskatchewan) Nathan Rolston	(Manitoba) Jon Wade	Edmonton, Alberta
2012	(Saskatchewan) Scott Cummine	(Saskatchewan) Brad Provick	(Alberta) Jay Smith	Regina, SK
2013	(Saskatchewan) Scott Cummine	(Saskatchewan) Brad Provick	(Manitoba) Jon Wade	Regina, SK
2014	(Saskatchewan) Scott Cummine	(Saskatchewan) Brad Provick	(Saskatchewan) Quinton Falk	Regina, SK
2015	(Manitoba) Dom Liontas	(Saskatchewan) Brad Provick	(Alberta) Artur Walus	Regina, SK
2016	(Saskatchewan) Scott Cummine	(Saskatchewan) Brad Provick	(Manitoba) Dom Liontas	Regina, SK
2017	(Alberta) James Loach	(Alberta) Brad Shepherd	(Alberta) Artur Walus	Regina, SK
2018	(Alberta) James Loach	(Manitoba) Dom Liontas	(Alberta) Artur Walus	Regina, SK
2019	(Alberta) Brad Shepherd	(Saskatchewan) Sam Rissling	(Alberta) Artur Walus	Regina, SK
2020–2021	Event not held due to Covid			
2022	(British Columbia) Sean Hayes	(Saskatchewan) James Jeffers	(Manitoba) Tyler Sigurdson	Regina, SK
2023	(Saskatchewan) James Jeffers	(Saskatchewan) Tristain Hoath	(Alberta) Colten Sloan	Fort McMurray, AB
2024	(British Columbia) Sean Hayes	(Saskatchewan) James Jeffers	(Alberta) Colten Sloan	Duncan, BC
2025	(Alberta) Colten Sloan	(Manitoba) Andrew Langelaar	(Saskatchewan) Samuel Rissling	Devon, AB
2026	(Alberta) Colten Sloan	(British Columbia) Cameron St. Amand	(British Columbia) Sean Hayes	Calgary, AB

=== Eastern Canada's Strongest Man ===
Year	Champion	Runner-up	3rd place	Location
2022	(Ontario) Wesley Derwinsky	(Quebec) Simon Pratte	(New Brunswick) Joey Lavallee	Saint-André-Avellin, QC
2023	(New Brunswick) Joey Lavallee	(Ontario) Wesley Derwinsky	(Quebec) Kerri VanderStelt	Saint-Cyprien, QC
2024	(Quebec) Fredrick Rhéaume	(Quebec) Gabriel Rhéaume	(New Brunswick) Joey Lavallee	Trois-Rivieres, QC
2025	(Quebec) Kerri VanderStelt	(Quebec) Fredrick Rhéaume	(Quebec) Samuel Daigle	Ayer's Cliff, QC
2026	(Quebec) Simon Pratte	(Quebec) Mathieu Poirier	(Quebec) Gabriel Rhéaume	Ayer's Cliff, QC

=== Atlantic Canada's Strongest Man ===
Year	Champion	Runner-up	3rd place
2000	(Canada) Tim Griffith	(Canada) Shane Murphy	(To be confirmed)
2001	(Canada) Shane Murphy	(To be confirmed)	(To be confirmed)
2002	(Canada) Shane Murphy	(Canada) Jonathan Hickey	(To be confirmed)
2003	(Canada) Shane Murphy	(Canada) Brad Carty	(Canada) Jonathan Hickey
2004	(Canada) Brad Carty	(Canada) Shane Murphy	(Canada) Grant Connors
2005	(Canada) Grant Connors	(Canada) Darrell Crouse	(Canada) Kevin O'Keefe
2006	(Canada) Grant Connors	(Canada) Jonathan Schooten	(Canada) Chris Bulman
2007	(Canada) Grant Connors	(Canada) Danny Frame	(Canada) Jonathan Schooten
2008	(Canada) Grant Connors	(Canada) Danny Frame	(Canada) Chris Harper
2009	(Canada) Grant Connors	(Canada) Danny Frame	(Canada) Jonathan Schooten
2010	(Canada) Grant Connors	(Canada) Danny Frame	(Canada) Kalen Brennan
2011	(Canada) Grant Connors	(Canada) Jonathan Schooten	(Canada) Jay Smith
2012	(Canada) Kalen Brennan	(Canada) Alex Wallace	(To be confirmed)

== Regional Competitions ==
=== North America's Strongest Man ===
North America's Strongest Man
Tournament information
- Location: Quebec
- Established: 1992
- Format: Multi-event competition

Current champion
- (United States) Bryce Johnson

North America's Strongest Man is an annual strongman competition consisting of athletes from both United States and Canada. The event was established in 1992 with Gary Mitchell of the United States winning the inaugural competition.

Despite the three hiatus periods (1994-1997, 2004-2006 and 2015-2022), the competition has been held eighteen times. Canada has produced five champions who shared ten titles among them while United States has produced eight champions with a title each for a total of eight.

The contest has been always held in Quebec.

==== Champions breakdown ====
Year	Champion	Runner-up	3rd place	Location
1992	(United States) Gary Mitchell	(To be confirmed)	(To be confirmed)	Gatineau, Quebec
1993	(United States) Steve Pulcinella	(To be confirmed)	(To be confirmed)	Gatineau, Quebec
1994–1997	Event not held			
1998	(United States) David Brown	(To be confirmed)	(To be confirmed)	Gatineau, Quebec
1999	(United States) Steve Dmytrow	(To be confirmed)	(To be confirmed)	Gatineau, Quebec
2001	(Canada) Hugo Girard	(Canada) Geoff Dolan	(United States) Phil Pfister	Gatineau, Quebec
2002	(Canada) Hugo Girard	(To be confirmed)	(To be confirmed)	Gatineau, Quebec
2003	(United States) Jon Andersen	(United States) Chad Coy	(United States) Walt Gogola	Gatineau, Quebec
2004–2006	Event not held			
2007	(Canada) Jessen Paulin	(United States) Brian Shaw	(Canada) Christian Savoie	Gatineau, Quebec
2008	(Canada) Jessen Paulin	(Canada) Christian Savoie	(United States) Pete Konradt	Gatineau, Quebec
2009	(Canada) Christian Savoie	(Canada) Jean-François Caron	(United States) Josh Thigpen	Gatineau, Quebec
2010	(Canada) Christian Savoie	(Canada) Jean-François Caron	(Canada) Scott Cummine	Gatineau, Quebec
2011	(Canada) Christian Savoie	(Canada) Jean-François Caron	(United States) Karl Gillingham	Gatineau, Quebec
2012	(Canada) Jean-François Caron	(United States) Dave Ostlund	(Canada) Jackie Ouellett	Gatineau, Quebec
2013	(Canada) Jean-François Caron	(Canada) Christian Savoie	(United States) Dave Ostlund	Gatineau, Quebec
2014	(United States) Brian Shaw	(Canada) Jean-François Caron	(Canada) Simon Boudreau	Gatineau, Quebec
2015–2022	Event not held			
2023	(United States) Trey Mitchell	(United States) Lucas Hatton	(Canada) Wesley Derwinsky	Victoriaville, Quebec
2024	(Canada) Maxime Boudreault	(United States) Lucas Hatton	(Canada) Tristain Hoath	Victoriaville, Quebec
2025	(United States) Bryce Johnson	(Canada) Wesley Derwinsky	(United States) Nick Wortham	Victoriaville, Quebec
2026	(United States) Bryce Johnson (2)	(United States) Trey Mitchell	(United States) Thomas Evans	Victoriaville, Quebec

- Results courtesy of David Horne's World of Grip: http://www.davidhorne-gripmaster.com/strongmanresults.html

==== Repeat champions ====
Champion	Times & years
(Canada) Christian Savoie	3 (2009, 2010, 2011)
(Canada) Hugo Girard	2 (2001, 2002)
(Canada) Jessen Paulin	2 (2007, 2008)
(Canada) Jean-François Caron	2 (2012, 2013)
(United States) Bryce Johnson (2)	2 (2025, 2026)
