= Louis-Philippe Jean =

Canadian strength athlete

Louis-Phillipe Jean
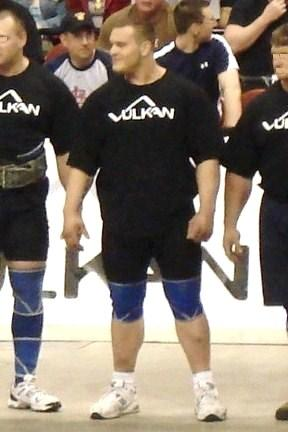
- Born: August 15, 1984 (age 42); Port-Cartier, Côte-Nord, Quebec, Canada
- Occupation: Strongman
- Employer(s): Les Pneu Michel Jean & fils, EntrepriseLPJ.
- Height: 6 ft 2 in (1.88 m)
- Title: Canada's Strongest Man
- Spouse: Kim Des Besquet
- Children: Marie-Soleil Dumais

Competition record

Strongman

Representing Canada

World's Strongest Man
Qualified	2008 World's Strongest Man
10th	2009 World's Strongest Man
Qualified	2010 World's Strongest Man
Qualified	2011 World's Strongest Man

Giants Live
4th	2009 Mohegan Sun
5th	2010 London
4th	2012 Poland

Fortissimus
4th	2008 Fortissimus
8th	2009 Fortissimus

Canada's Strongest Man
3rd	2006 Canada's Strongest Man
4th	2007 Canada's Strongest Man
1st	2008 Canada's Strongest Man
2nd	2009 Canada's Strongest Man

All-American Strongman Challenge
3rd	2010 All-American Strongman Challenge
4th	2011 All-American Strongman Challenge

Vice Grip Viking Challenge
5th	2011 Vice Grip Viking Challenge

Louis-Phillipe Jean (born August 15, 1984) is a Canadian strongman competitor and entrant to the World's Strongest Man competition on multiple occasions.

== Strongman career ==
Louis-Phillipe Jean began competing in strongman at the age of 17 and won the Quebec Cup at the age of 22, the youngest man to ever win the title. He came third in his first appearance at Canada's Strongest Man in 2006. Louis soon began competing on the international circuit and was invited to the Strongman Super Series in 2007.

In 2008, Jean became Canada's Strongest Man, the youngest man to ever win the title, and also finished in fourth place at Fortissimus in Quebec. Jean won the Overhead Power Medley event at the Fortissimus contest.

Jean was named "Canada's Strongman of the Year" by Fortissimus World Strength in 2008 after winning Canada's Strongest Man, his high placing at Fortissimus, and becoming the youngest Canadian to ever qualify for World's Strongest Man.

Jean was invited to the 2008 World's Strongest Man contest, although he failed to make the finals. In 2009, Jean did make the final of the 2009 World's Strongest Man in Valletta, Malta, finishing in 10th place. Jean returned to the 2010 World's Strongest Man contest in Sun City, South Africa but failed to make the finals.

Jean broke the Canadian log lift world record on April 30, 2011, by lifting 195.5 kilograms (431 lb). This record stood until 2017; the previous record was held by Hugo Girard at 186 kilograms (410 lb) which was set at the Strongman Super Series Canada Grand Prix in 2003.

== Personal life ==
Jean married Kim Des Becquets on August 20, 2011. The wedding took place at the Saint-Charles-Borromée church in Quebec City. Fellow strongman competitor, training partner and close friend Derek Poundstone was a groomsman at the wedding.

Jean reportedly trained so hard with Poundstone during the days prior to the wedding in preparation for the 2011 World's Strongest Man contest, that he had difficulty walking down the aisle for the ceremony.

== Personal Records ==
=== Strongman ===
- Log lift for max weight: 195.5 kilograms (431 lb) Canadian national record
- Apollon's Axle: 186 kilograms (410 lb) for repetitions, 204.5 kilograms (451 lb) for max weight
- Best powerlifting total : 2,100 pounds (950 kg) as a junior
- 12 junior powerlifting world records : WPO, CPU.

=== Powerlifting ===
done in official meets

- Squat : 409 kilograms (902 lb) raw with wraps wearing neoprene shorts
- Bench press : 238 kilograms (525 lb) raw
- Deadlift : 389 kilograms (858 lb) raw
- Total : 1,036 kilograms (2,284 lb) raw with wraps wearing neoprene shorts
