= 2009 World's Strongest Man =

Strongman competition in 2009

Competition information
- Dates: 26 September – 3 October 2009
- Venue: Fort Saint Elmo / Malta International Airport / Blue Grotto / Grand Hotel Excelsior
- Location: Valletta
- Country: Malta
- Athletes participating: 30
- Nations participating: 17

Champion(s)
- (Lithuania) Žydrūnas Savickas

The World's Strongest Man 2009 was the 32nd edition of World's Strongest Man and took place in Valletta, Malta from 26 September to 3 October 2009. It was sponsored by PartyPoker.com. It was anticipated by the strength athletics world as promising to be "the best one yet." The anticipation was based on the organisers ensuring invites were made to "every top athlete in the world" regardless of their affiliation to any particular strength athletics body. In previous years, the schism between the International Federation of Strength Athletes and the organisers of WSM had meant that certain athletes were forbidden to compete, undermining the credentials of the competition.

== Qualifying ==
The official qualifying competition for the 2009 WSM was the newly created Giants Live tour. This had taken the place of the World's Strongest Man Super Series, although the latter continued to run with a separate pool of athletes. However, the weakening of the IFSA, due to the economic pressures affecting the whole of the strength athletics world at this time, had led to the breaking down of barriers between the various concurrent circuits. Strength athletes were able to compete in more than one circuit and did so, with a cross over of athletes between the Giants Live circuit, the Strongman Champions League and the Strongman Super Series. In an interview with Ironmind, a source close to the WSM decision makers said, "World's Strongest Man has never stopped the world's best strongmen from going to WSM and now that the world of strongman is getting much closer, it appears that we will be able to have every top athlete in the world there [this year]." This led to Ironmind stating that the World's Strongest Man 2009 promises to be the best one yet. Such is the status of WSM that Ironmind also stated that "If you are a leading strongman competitor, or want to be recognized as one, the most important thing at this point is to get an invitation to the 2009 World's Strongest Man contest."

This ethos led to a mixture of qualifying criteria applied. Mariusz Pudzianowski qualified, by virtue of being the defending WSM champion. A further eight competitors were selected based on their showing on Giants Live (Brian Shaw; Derek Poundstone; Travis Ortmayer; Mikhail Koklyaev (injured so did not compete); Richard Skog; Mark Felix; Jarek Dymek; and Stefan Solvi Petursson). In addition "the top five from Strongman Champions League were taken into account", in a deal struck with the relatively new organisation which had already made deals with such high-profile tournaments as Fortissimus. The IMG committee also developed a list of wild card invitations. This gave them the flexibility to invite the very top athletes in the world who were not part of the official qualifying tour, or subsequent agreements with other bodies. Through this avenue Zydrunas Savickas, six-time winner of the Arnold's Strongest Man, IFSA World Champion, and Fortissimus winner, deemed by many as the strongest man in the world was invited. Also, those who performed well in the revamped Strongman Super Series also received invites as well as podium finishers in certain one-off events.

== Competitors ==
The 2009 WSM line-up was widely agreed to have been one of, if not the best ever. Every major federation and Strongman competition was represented. Among those competing were the current and 5-time World's Strongest Man, Mariusz Pudzianowski (also the last man to win the World Strongman Cup); 2-time IFSA World Champion and reigning Fortissimus champion Zydrunas Savickas, titled the Strongest Man on the Planet, (also the Strongman Champions League winner); and that year's Arnold Strongman Classic champion, Derek Poundstone, (also the current Strongman Super Series overall champion). Additionally, a former World's Strongest Man, Phil Pfister, the Highlander World Champion Sebastian Wenta, the Rolling Thunder world champion, Mark Felix, and 15 current national champions and a former World Champion in the 105 kg class. So strong was the line-up that Tarmo Mitt, four times a WSM finalist, was only among the reserves. The competitors held, between them, at least 15 strongman world records.

| Name | Nationality | WSM record | Other Strongman Achievements |
|---|---|---|---|
| Mariusz Pudzianowski | Poland | 5 time World's Strongest Man champion (2002, 2003, 2005, 2007, 2008); 2nd place 2006 World's Strongest Man, 4th place 2000 | 2 time World Strongman Cup overall champion 2006, 2007; 4 time Strongman Super Series overall World Champion |
| Jarek Dymek | Poland | 4th place 2005 World's Strongest Man | Europe's Strongest Man 2005 |
| Alexander Klyushev | Russia | | Russia's Strongest Man 2008; Second place in World's Strongest Nation 2008 |
| Richard Skog | Norway | | 2009 Norway's strongest man 2nd place 2009 Giants Live Norway |
| Mark Felix | England | 4th place 2006 World's Strongest Man | 2 time Rolling Thunder World Champion and World Record Holder; IFSA Britain's Strongest Man 2005 |
| Stefán Sölvi Pétursson | Iceland | | Iceland's Strongest Man 2009 (and 2008 IFSA); 3rd place Giants Live Poland 2009 |
| Travis Ortmayer | United States | 5th place 2008 World's Strongest Man | 3rd at Arnold Strongman Classic 2009; 2nd place 2005 IFSA Pan-American Championships; 1st place 2008 Strongman Super Series Madison Square Garden Grand Prix; 1st place 2009 Giants Live Norway |
| Derek Poundstone | United States | 2nd place 2008 World's Strongest Man | 2 time America's Strongest Man champion 2007 & 2008; 2009 Arnold Strongman Classic champion 2008 Fortissimus champion Strongman Super Series overall World Champion 2008, 1st place 2008 Strongman Super Series Mohegan Sun Grand Prix; 1st place 2009 Giants Live Mohegan Sun Grand Prix; 4th place 2007 IFSA Strongman World Championships; 2nd place 2007 World's Strongest Team |
| Brian Shaw | United States | | 3rd place Fortissimus 2009; Winner of 2009 FIT Expo |
| Phil Pfister | United States | 2006 World's Strongest Man champion 4th place 1998, 2001, 2007, 2008 | 3rd place Arnold Strongman Classic 2002; 3 time runner-up America's Strongest Man |
| Kevin Nee | United States | 6th place 2007 World's Strongest Man(youngest competitor to ever make the finals) | Youngest ever competitor in WSM in 2005; 2nd place 2007 Mohegan Sun Grand Prix |
| Zydrunas Savickas | Lithuania | 2nd place World's Strongest Man 2002–2004 | Six time winner of Arnold Strongman Classic 2003–2008; 2-time winner IFSA Strongman World Championships 2005 & 2006; 2008 Strongman Champions League overall winner 2009 Fortissimus champion 2004 Strongman Super Series overall World Champion; 1st place 2008 & 2009 World Log Lift Championships; World Record Holder in 8 separate Strongman events 10-time winner Lithuania's Strongest Man; 1st place 2007 World's Strongest Team |
| Jimmy Laureys | Belgium | | 2008 Belgium's Strongest Man |
| Terry Hollands | England | 3rd WSM 2007 | Britain's Strongest Man 2007; UK's Strongest Man 2005; England's Strongest Man (WSM) 2009 |
| Jimmy Marku | England | | Britain's Strongest Man 2008; UK's Strongest Man 2009; England's Strongest Man 2006–2008 |
| Laurence Shahlaei | England | | England's Strongest Man 2009 |
| Darren Sadler | England | | 2007 Champion IFSA World Strongman Challenge u105k 2nd 2005 World Championships u105k(IFSA) |
| Sebastian Wenta | Poland | 2nd at 2007 WSM | Highlander World Champion (07,08,09); 3rd at 2008 Fortissimus |
| Johannes Arsjo | Sweden | | 4th Place Viking Power Challenge 2009 |
| Martin Wildauer | Austria | | 3rd Strongman Champions League Finland Grand Prix 2009 |
| Dave Ostlund | United States | 3rd WSM 2008 | 1st Venice Beach Super Series 2007; 3rd Madison Square Garden Super Series 2008 |
| Marshall White | United States | | Bucharest WSMSS Grand Prix 2009 winner |
| Agris Kazelniks | Latvia | | 2nd Strongman Champions League Holland Grand Prix 2009 |
| Andrus Murumets | Estonia | | Estonia's Strongest Man (02 and 05); Multiple wins in Strongman Champions League Grand Prixs; 3rd 2007 Arnold Strongman Classic |
| Konstantin Ilin | Ukraine | | 2009 Ukraine's Strongest Man |
| Florian Trimpl | Germany | | 2009 Germany's Strongest Man |
| Ettiene Smit | South Africa | | 6 times South Africa's Strongest Man |
| Ervin Katona | Serbia | | 2nd place in 2008 Strongman Champions League |
| Christian Savoie | Canada | | 2009 Canada's Strongest Man |
| Louis Philippe Jean | Canada | | 2008 Canada's Strongest Man |
| Reserve: Tarmo Mitt | Estonia | 5th in 2006; 4 consecutive finals (2005–08) | 6x Estonia's Strongest Man; 2nd overall in 2006 World Strongman Cup; 2nd Sweden Super Series 2008 |
| Reserve: Simon Sulaiman | Netherlands/Syria | | Holland's Strongest Man 2009 |

== Format ==
The 25 competitors were split into five separate heats, each consisting of six events. After each event each competitor was given points, from 5 for first to 1 for last. Half points occurred if more than one competitor has the same result, and no points were scored if a competitor did not take part in an event. The points were tallied after the six events and the two competitors with the most points from each heat progressed to the final. The final consisted of seven events and the champion was the competitor with the most points after all of the events.

The Head referee was Colin Bryce, assisted by Svend Karlsen (the 2001 World's Strongest Man). Jouko Ahola, World's Strongest Man winner from 1997 and 1999, was the equipment manager.

== Events ==
There were a total of 15 different events used in the competition:

In the Group stages the a mixture of the following events were used:

- Medley – Cannonball & sledge (the event took place on the Valletta Waterfront)
- Medley – Anchor & chain & barrels (the event took place on the Valletta Waterfront)
- Truck Pull (the event took place on the Valletta Waterfront – all groups were involved)
- Squat Lift (the event took place at the Grand Hotel Excelsior – groups one and four involved)
- Dead Lift (the event took place at the Grand Hotel Excelsior – groups two, three and five involved)
- Car Walk (the event took place at the Grand Hotel Excelsior – groups one, three and four involved)
- Fingal's Fingers (the event took place on the Birgu Waterfront – groups two and five were involved)
- Dumbbell Press (the event took place on the Birgu Waterfront – groups one and three were involved)
- Keg Toss (the event took place at Golden Bay – groups two, four and five were involved)
- Atlas Stones (the event took place at Golden Bay – all groups were involved)

In the final:

- Fingal's Fingers (the event took place at Fort St Elmo)
- Giant Farmer's Walk (the event took place at Fort St Elmo)
- Plane Pull (limited public access)
- Overhead Lift – Apollon's Axle (the event took place at Wied iz-Zurrieq)
- Boat Pull (the event took place at Wied iz-Zurrieq)
- Car Deadlift (the event took place at the Grand Hotel Excelsior)
- Atlas Stones (the event took place at the Grand Hotel Excelsior)

== Heats ==
=== Group 1 ===
| Position | Name | Nationality | Event 1 Medley | Event 2 Truck Pull | Event 3 Squat Lift | Event 4 Carwalk | Event 5 Dumbbell Press | Event 6 Atlas Stones |
|---|---|---|---|---|---|---|---|---|
| 1 (34pts) | Derek Poundstone | United States | 1 (38.71s) | 1 (42.66s) | 2 (6 in 30.02s) | 1 (19.09s) | 1 (9 reps) | 2 (4 stones in 25.1s) |
| 4 (18pts) | Jimmy Marku | England | 2 (44.06s) | 6 (1m 07.47s) | 1 (6 in 25.57s) | 5 (12.3m) | 4= (0 reps) | 3 (4 stones in 59.6s) |
| WD (after Rd 5) | Kevin Nee | United States | 6 (16.6m) | 5 (1m 05.59s) | 3 (6 in 31.19s) | 3 (46.53s) | 4= (0 reps) | WD |
| 3 (21pts) | Konstiantyn Ilin | Ukraine | 5 (1m 06.49s) | 2 (50.08s) | 4 (6 in 31.85s) | 4 (49.34s) | 2 (8 reps) | 4 (2 stones in 37.42s) |
| 2 (25pts) | Louis-Philippe Jean | Canada | 3 (46.00s) | 3 (58.28s) | 5 (5 in 26.38s) | 2 (26.6s) | 3 (6 reps) | 1 (5 stones in 48.73s) |
| WD (after Rd 2) | Sebastian Wenta | Poland | 4 (54.37s) | 4 (58.37s) | WD | WD | WD | WD |

=== Group 2 ===
| Position | Name | Nationality | Event 1 Medley | Event 2 Truck Pull | Event 3 Dead Lift | Event 4 Fingal's Fingers | Event 5 Keg Toss | Event 6 Atlas Stones |
|---|---|---|---|---|---|---|---|---|
| 2 (30pts) | Brian Shaw | United States | 2 (22.79s) | 1 (42.19s) | 3 (7 in 35.97s) | 2 (5 in 31.34s) | 2 (8 in 29.41s) | 2 (5 stones in 29.27s) |
| 4 (17pts) | Mark Felix | England | 3 (24.13s) | 5 (51.56s) | 1 (7 in 31.36s) | 5 (4 in 34.15s) | 6 (4 in 1m15:00s) | 5 (5 stones in 48.49s) |
| 6 (12.5pts) | Marshall White | United States | 6 (28.67s) | 6 (56.97s) | 6 (4 in 17.67s) | 3 (5 in 56.67s) | 4= (6 in 1m15:00s) | 4 (5 stones in 37.67s) |
| 5 (13.5pts) | Martin Wildauer | Austria | 4 (25.28s) | 4 (50.94s) | 4 (7 in 36.26s) | 6 (4 in 56.68s) | 4= (6 in 1m15:00s) | 6 (4 stones in 30.90s) |
| 3 (21pts) | Stefan Solvi Petursson | Iceland | 5 (26.78s) | 3 (50.07s) | 5 (6 in 31.57s) | 4 (4 in 29.22s) | 1 (8 in 23.53s) | 3 (5 stones in 30.43s) |
| 1 (32pts) | Zydrunas Savickas | Lithuania | 1 (22.63s) | 2 (43.53s) | 2 (7 in 31.64s) | 1 (5 in 31.06s) | 3 (8 in 30.19s) | 1 (5 stones in 28.20s) |

=== Group 3 ===
| Position | Name | Nationality | Event 1 Medley | Event 2 Truck Pull | Event 3 Dead Lift | Event 4 Carwalk | Event 5 Dumbbell Press | Event 6 Atlas Stones |
|---|---|---|---|---|---|---|---|---|
| 5 (17.5pts) | Alexander Klyushev | Russia | 6 (49.83s) | 5 (1m10.06s) | 4 (7 in 45.97s) | 3 (25.06s) | 1= (6 reps) | 5 (4 in 38.27s) |
| 3 (22pts) | Darren Sadler | England | 4 (45.17s) | 4 (1m02.31s) | 1 (7 in 35.19s) | 5 (47.41s) | 3 (4 reps) | 3 (4 in 35.85s) |
| 4 (20.5pts) | Ervin Katona | Serbia | 3 (44.12s) | 3 (49.22s) | 3 (7 in 43.03s) | 4 (28.28s) | 4= (3 reps) | 4 (4 in 37.14s) |
| 6 (7pts) | Jimmy Laureys | Belgium | 5 (49.53s) | 6 (1m10.91s) | 5 (5 in 33.07s) | 6 (5.8m) | 6 (0 reps) | 6 (4 in 39.21s) |
| 2 (27.5pts) | Mariusz Pudzianowski | Poland | 2 (37.81s) | 2 (45.40s) | 2 (7 in 36.50s) | 2 (20.72s) | 4= (3 reps) | 2 (5 in 33.91s) |
| 1 (30.5pts) | Phil Pfister | United States | 1 (35.90s) | 1 (40.91s) | 6 (4 in 23.25s) | 1 (20.30s) | 1= (6 reps) | 1 (5 in 24.88s) |

=== Group 4 ===
| Position | Name | Nationality | Event 1 Medley | Event 2 Truck Pull | Event 3 Squat Lift | Event 4 Carwalk | Event 5 Keg Toss | Event 6 Atlas Stones |
|---|---|---|---|---|---|---|---|---|
| 6 (15.5pts) | Agris Kazelniks | Latvia | 6 (33.85s) | 5 (56.88s) | 3 (6 in 32.27s) | 4 (25.63s) | 4= (4 in 1m15s) | 4 (4 in 47.43s) |
| 4 (20pts) | Ettiene Smit | South Africa | 5 (25.58s) | 6 (1m02.50s) | 2 (6 in 27.48s) | 2 (22.66s) | 1 (8 in 25.89s) | 6 (3 in 51.19s) |
| 3 (22pts) | Johannes Arsjo | Sweden | 1 (22.09s) | 4 (56.32s) | 4 (6 in 36.65s) | 6 (34.41s) | 2 (7 in 1m15s) | 3 (5 in 35.23s) |
| 1 (26pts) | Laurence Shahlaei | England | 2 (23.84s) | 1 (45.42s) | 1 (7 in 35.65s) | 1 (21.87s) | 6 (3 in 1m15s) | 5 (3 in 25.54s) |
| 5 (19.5pts) | Richard Skog | Norway | 4 (25.03s) | 2 (46.75s) | 5 (4 in 18.05s) | 5 (32.22s) | 4= (4 in 1m15s) | 2 (5 in 29.97s) |
| 2 (23pts) | Travis Ortmayer | United States | 3 (24.15s) | 3 (49.13s) | 6 (2 in 7.57s) | 3 (24.44s) | 3 (6 in 1m15s) | 1 (5 in 27.96s) |

=== Group 5 ===
| Position | Name | Nationality | Event 1 Medley | Event 2 Truck Pull | Event 3 Dead Lift | Event 4 Fingal's Fingers | Event 5 Keg Toss | Event 6 Atlas Stones |
|---|---|---|---|---|---|---|---|---|
| 3 (26pts) | Andrus Murumets | Estonia | 1 (34.38s) | 4 (47.07s) | 2 (6 in 30.89s) | 4 (4 in 45.45s) | 2= (6 in 1m15s) | 2 (5 in 30.03s) |
| 4 (18pts) | Christian Savoie | Canada | 3 (37.78s) | 2 (45.91s) | 4 (6 in 38.79s) | 6 (3 in 22.83s) | 6 (4 in 1m15s) | 3 (5 in 32.85s) |
| 2 (26pts) | Dave Ostlund | United States | 5 (42.15s) | 3 (46.28s) | 3 (6 in 30.96s) | 1 (5 in 33.84s) | 2= (6 in 1m15s) | 1 (5 in 26.66s) |
| 6 (12pts) | Florian Trimpl | Germany | 4 (41.98s) | 5 (57.43s) | 6 (5 in 32.74s) | 5 (4 in 49.85s) | 5 (5 in 1m15s) | 5 (4 in 32.66s) |
| 5 (15pts) | Jarek Dymek | Poland | 6 (46.40s) | 6 (16.2m) | 5 (5 in 24.30s) | 3 (4 in 32.47s) | 1 (7 in 1m15s) | 6 (4 in 34.49s) |
| 1 (29pts) | Terry Hollands | England | 2 (36.41s) | 1 (40.50s) | 1 (7 in 32.70s) | 2 (4 in 27.83s) | 2= (6 in 1m15s) | 4 (5 in 44.05s) |

== Final ==
Dates: 1, 2, 3 September 2009. Results published at Official WSM site

The quality in the final was immediately clear from the first event, the Fingal's Fingers. Only two men failed to complete all five fingers, and seven finished the event in less than 38 seconds. However, Žydrūnas Savickas staked his claim as the favourite for the title by becoming the first man in history to complete the event in under 30 seconds, setting a new world record. Mariusz Pudzianowski, despite having massively improved in this discipline from what used to be a poor event for him, could only finish in sixth, such was the high quality in the rest of the field.

However, in the Giant Farmer's Walk, Pudzianowski showed that he was still very much in contention for a sixth championship, completing the 50m course over 6 seconds faster than anyone else. Laurence Shahlaei produced an excellent performance to finish third and ahead of Savickas, whilst Terry Hollands and Brian Shaw both surprisingly finished in the bottom five. Travis Ortmayer was the only competitor to not complete all 50m, a result that, in retrospect, may well have cost him a chance at a top-3 overall finish.

The third event of the final, the Plane Pull, produced one of the closest events in World's Strongest Man history, with the top seven athletes separated by just 4.37 seconds. Remarkably, Shaw and Ortmayer finished with exactly the same time (40.53s), whilst Pudzianowski, who finished less than 0.7 seconds behind Savickas, scored 3 fewer points than the Lithuanian. Hollands, in one of his favourite events, was the only man to break 40s for the event, and claimed a much needed event win that moved him into the top five of the overall standings.

Savickas continued to extend his lead by comfortably winning the Overhead Lift with 9 lifts, an event which he was expected to win, and his dominance over the field was beginning to show: he had scored 36 out of a possible 40 points from the first four events of the final. Pudzianowski and Derek Poundstone finished tied in second place with 8 lifts, and Louis-Philippe Jean produced his best performance of the final to finish in joint-sixth with 5. Both of the British athletes, Hollands and Shahlaei, could only muster 2 lifts apiece.

Going into the Boat Pull, Pudzianowski was 6.5 points behind Savickas and knew that his chances of a sixth title were fading fast. However, the Lithuanian struggled mightily in this event, only managing to finish in eighth, and in so doing handed the Polish strongman a lifeline. Pudzianowski seized his chance, and, showing his professionalism, dusted the wooden board all the athletes had to sit on with talcum powder to enable his backside to not get stuck. This decision paid off, and in an event which undoubtedly favoured the taller athletes with longer arms, Pudzianowski produced an outrageous time of 39.38s to go into the lead. Brian Shaw, however, proceeded to obliterate the Pole's time, finishing nearly 7 seconds faster to win the event. The result changed the outlook of the competition dramatically: Savickas, from an almost unassailable position, was now leading Pudzianowski by just half a point, and Shaw had brought himself into contention as well, just three points behind Pudzianowski. A poor seventh-place result for Poundstone dropped him down into fourth overall.

The Car Deadlift was a close run affair, with all but three athletes managing more than five successful lifts. After having performed so well in the heats, Phil Pfister's final continued to go from bad to worse as he failed to complete a single lift. Matched head-to-head with each other, Poundstone just outlasted Shaw, completing 9 lifts to his fellow American's 8. Pudzianowski and Savickas went head to head as the last pairing, and Savickas' superior static strength led to him to complete an astonishing 11 lifts. Pudzianowski's notorious ability to grind out repetitions enabled him to match Poundstone's 9, but missed out on an extra half point as his attempt for a 10th lift was not locked out successfully.

Going into the final event of the Atlas Stones, Pudzianowski trailed Savickas by just 2 points in what would be a head-to-head showdown for the title, and Poundstone trailed Shaw by just 1 point in their battle for third. However, in a final of such high quality, where only Laurence Shahlaei failed to lift all five stones, a few tenth's of a second here or there would prove decisive. Ortmayer lived up to his nickname of "The Texas Stoneman" by winning the event, finishing in under 25 seconds, whilst Shaw won his head-to-head battle with Poundstone to confirm a third-place finish. In a repeat of the 2002 World's Strongest Man final, Savickas and Pudzianowski were the final match up of the competition, with the Pole needing to finish three places ahead of the Lithuanian to win a record-extending sixth title. Pudzianowski was much quicker on the first stone, but didn't quite lift the second stone high enough for its platform, which allowed Savickas to catch up and move ahead. Despite Pudzianowski's best efforts, he could not recover the deficit, and Savickas' clean run led to him finish just behind Ortmayer's time to confirm himself as World's Strongest Man for the first time. In an excellent display of sportsmanship, Pudzianowski raised Savickas' hand in acknowledgement of the Lithuanian's victory. The top 7 in the Atlas stones were separated by just 4.38 seconds. Ortmayer's event win finished off an excellent performance in the final, with 5 top-four finishes in the 7 disciplines, leaving him in fifth place overall, just half a point behind his compatriot Poundstone. Dave Ostlund meanwhile failed to reproduce the form he had shown at the previous year's competition where he finished third; despite starting the final excellently with a second-place finish in the Fingal's Fingers, he failed to finish higher than eighth in any other event in the final.

=== Results ===
| Position | Name | Nationality | Event 1 Fingal's Fingers | Event 2 Medley Giant Farmer's Walk | Event 3 Plane Pull | Event 4 Overhead Lift Apollon's Axle | Event 5 Boat Pull | Event 6 Car Deadlift | Event 7 Atlas Stones |
|---|---|---|---|---|---|---|---|---|---|
| 01 (58pts) | Žydrūnas Savickas | Lithuania | 01 (5 in 28.69s ^{WR}) | 04 (36.20s) | 02 (40.24s) | 01 (9 lifts) | 08 (1m02.94s) | 01 (11 lifts) | 02 (5 in 24.63s) |
| 02 (53pts) | Mariusz Pudzianowski | Poland | 06 (5 in 36.47s) | 01 (25.05s) | 05 (40.91s) | 02= (8 lifts) | 02 (39.38s) | 02= (9 lifts) | 05 (5 in 26.57s) |
| 03 (49pts) | Brian Shaw | United States | 03 (5 in 32.37s) | 07 (48.80s) | 03= (40.53s) | 05 (6 lifts) | 01 (32.44s) | 04= (8 lifts) | 04 (5 in 25.62s) |
| 04 (46pts) | Derek Poundstone | United States | 05 (5 in 35.38s) | 02 (31.63s) | 06 (41.12s) | 02= (8 lifts) | 07 (1m06.14s) | 02= (9 lifts) | 06 (5 in 27.03s) |
| 05 (45.5pts) | Travis Ortmayer | United States | 04 (5 in 34.85s) | 10 (45.05m) | 03 (40.53s) | 04 (7 lifts) | 03 (45.88s) | 06 (7 lifts) | 01 (5 in 24.29s) |
| 06 (41pts) | Terry Hollands | England | 08 (5 in 43.07s) | 06 (37.13s) | 01 (38.19s) | 09= (2 lifts) | 04 (47.07s) | 04= (8 lifts) | 03 (5 in 25.22s) |
| 07 (28.5pts) | Phil Pfister | United States | 07 (5 in 37.57s) | 05 (36.86s) | 07 (42.56s) | 06= (5 lifts) | 05 (50.89s) | 10 (0 lifts) | 07 (5 in 28.67s) |
| 08 (25pts) | Dave Ostlund | United States | 02 (5 in 32.08s) | 09 (1m12.37s) | 08 (45.53s) | 08 (4 lifts) | 09 (1m06.14s) | 08 (5 lifts) | 08 (5 in 32.13s) |
| 09 (23.5pts) | Laurence Shahlaei | England | 09 (4 in 38.03s) | 03 (33.54s) | 09 (45.54s) | 09= (2 lifts) | 06 (51.13s) | 07 (6 lifts) | 10 (4 in 28.03s) |
| 10 (14.5pts) | Louis-Philippe Jean | Canada | 10 (4 in 44.11s) | 08 (50.45s) | 10 (46.69s) | 06= (5 lifts) | 10 (12.3m) | 09 (3 lifts) | 09 (5 in 51.47s) |

== Television broadcast ==
=== United States ===
In the USA the event was broadcast on ESPN and ESPN2 in January 2010, on Thursday 7 January and Saturday 9 January, with some repeat screenings on Sunday 10, 17 and 24 January. Further screenings in late February and March are planned.

=== United Kingdom ===
In the UK Bravo obtained the rights to screen both The Giants Live Tour (the official qualifying tour for The World's Strongest Man) as well as the finals. Giants Live was shown on three consecutive days from Saturday 26 December 2009 to Monday 28 December. The finals were broadcast over six consecutive Mondays in early 2010 from 4 January to 8 February, with each episode dedicated to a qualifying group, and the sixth episode being the final. The UK broadcast was produced by IMG Media for Bravo and featured presenters Martin Bayfield and Zöe Salmon, with some guest presenters including Bill Kazmaier and Svend Karlsen. The commentators were Paul Dickenson and Colin J L Bryce and the outside broadcast was performed by 021 Television Ltd.

| Preceded by 2008 World's Strongest Man | 2009 World's Strongest Man | Succeeded by 2010 World's Strongest Man |
