= Luke Skaarup =

Canadian strength athlete

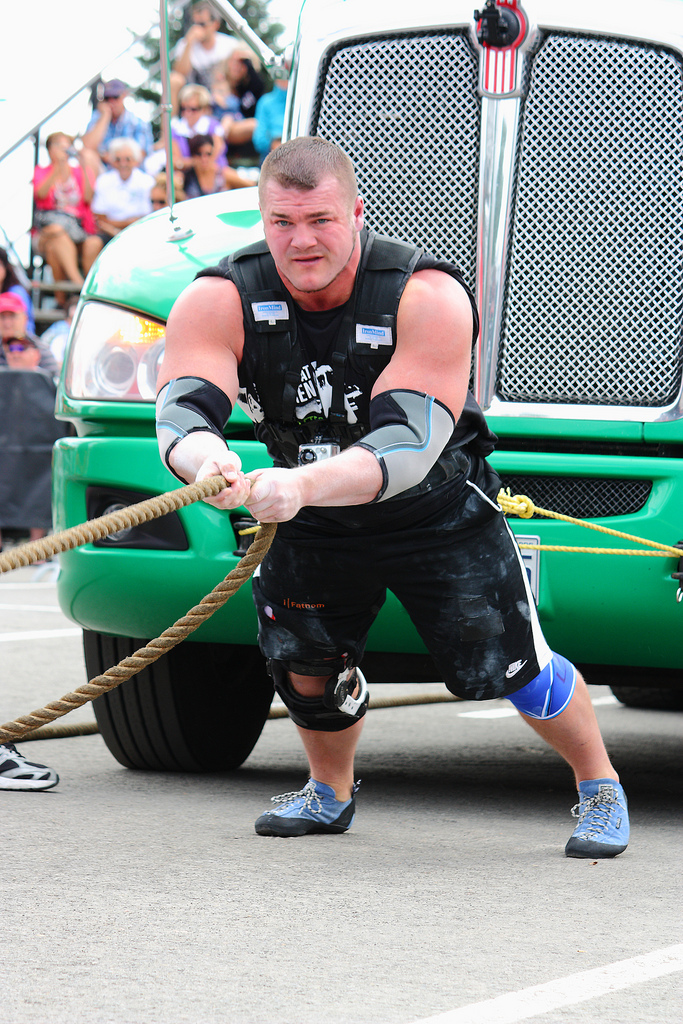
- Skaarup in 2012
- Born: September 29, 1979 (age 46); Thunder Bay, Ontario, Canada
- Other name: The Iron Viking
- Occupations: Strongman, Mechanical Engineer
- Known for: 2 x Ontario's Strongest Man- 2012 & 2014
- Height: 6 ft 0 in (1.83 m)
- Spouse: Nicolette Skaarup
- Children: Brayden, Gabrielle, Logan, Charlotte

Competition record

Strongman

Representing Canada

World Amateur Strongman Championship
Qualified	2010
8th	2012

Canada's Strongest Man
8th	2009
6th	2012
6th	2013
10th	2014
9th	2015

Canada's Strongest Man under 105kg
2nd	2008

North America's Strongest Man
12th	2009
6th	2013
4th	2014
10th	2015<

Ontario's Strongest Man
9th	2007
6th	2008
3rd	2009
3rd	2010
5th	2011
1st	2012
4th	2013
1st	2014
2nd	2015

Luke Skaarup (born September 9, 1979) is a professional engineer and also a retired professional strongman from Canada who competed actively in the sport of strongman from 2007 to 2015. During his competitive career, he held many records, most notably the Canadian record for heaviest atlas stone ever lifted in competition (450 pounds (200 kg)), the Ontario record for heaviest deadlift (780 pounds (350 kg)), and the Ontario Record heaviest dumbbell press (230 pounds (100 kg)). He competed in over sixty competitions with his top placings being the 2 x Ontario's Strongest Man Champion (2012 & 2014), 4th at North America's Strongest Man (2014), and 8th at the World Amateur Strongman Championships (2012).

He has competed in strongman for 9 years with 2 years of powerlifting and 5 years of bodybuilding competitions prior to that. Luke has been lifting weights seriously for over 20 years and began when he was 16 years of age to assist his physical development and strength for football.

Personal - Luke is married to his wife Nicolette Skaarup and is the father of four children (Brayden, Gabrielle, Logan, and Charlotte). Education- Luke has a diploma in Mechanical Engineering Technology from Lakehead University (2000), a degree in Mechanical Engineering from Lakehead University (2003), and a master's degree from Queens University in Earth Energy Resource Leadership (MEERL- 2022). He is a professional engineer and is employed as a senior leader with a large energy company in Alberta. Luke is the oldest of five children. He has a younger brother and three sisters. His brother Dan Skaarup was also a competitive strength athlete and former bodybuilder.

After retiring in 2015, Luke had left biceps reattachment surgery and ACL repair surgery in his right knee in 2016. While Luke has retired from competing in strength sports he still weight trains regularly, coaches youth football and encourages his children to pursue their own sports.

== Ontario records ==
- 18" deadlift (1150 lbs),
- Deadlift (780 lbs),
- Circus dumbbell (230 lbs),
- Farmer's walk (310 lbs per hand for 160 ft in 23.5s),
- Yoke (850 lbs for 100 ft in 20.5s)

== Canadian records ==
He lifted the heaviest atlas stone ever lifted in competition, that weighed 454 lbs to 38.5". This same stone has also been lifted by JF Caron at Canada's Strongest Man in 2016.

== Personal records ==
Powerlifting (competition):

- Squat - 340.9 kg (752 lb) equipped
- Bench press - 210 kg (460 lb)
- Deadlift - 365.0 kg (804.7 lb)

Powerlifting (gym):

- Squat - 352 kg (776 lb)
- Bench press - 218.2 kg (481 lb)
- Deadlift - 365.9 kg (807 lb)

Strongman:

- Log lift for max weight - 168.2 kg (371 lb)
- 18" deadlift - 522.2 kg (1,151 lb)
- log press (370 lbs and 300 lbs x 8 reps),
- Military press (310 lbs x 5 reps),
- Push press 2" Axel (380 lbs x 2 reps),
- Tire flip (1300 lbs and 1100 lbs x 5 reps),
- Bench press (350 lbs x 16 reps and 225 lbs x 30 reps),
- Front squat (540 lbs x 3 reps),
- Natural stone (450 lbs),

== Profile ==
- Biceps: 54 cm (21 in)
- Neck : 48 cm (19 in)
- Calves: 48 cm (19 in)
- Chest: 142 cm (56 in)
- Quadriceps: 80 cm (31 in)
- Height: 182 centimetres (6 feet 0 inches)
- Weight: 140 kg (310 lb)

== Strongman competition history ==
Strong Man, Bodybuilding, Weight Lifting, Luke Skaarup: The Iron Viking

2015

- (Ontario) Canada's Strongest Man 2015 – Dubreuilville, ON, CAN – 9th place – injured
- (United States) USA Classic – Giant's Live Qualifier – Martinsville, IN, USA – 8th place – DNF – re-tore left biceps
- (Quebec) North America's Strongest Man 2015 – Warwick, QC, CAN – 9th place – DNF – torn quad and left biceps
- Ontario's Strongest Man 2015 – Toronto, ON, CAN – 2nd place
- (Ontario) Kings of Strength – Ancaster, ON, CAN – 1st place

2014

- (Ontario) Bavarian Strongman Competition – Oktoberfest – Kitchener, ON, CAN – 3rd place
- Canada's Strongest Man 2014 – Quebec City, QC, CAN – 10th place. Did not finish – torn biceps in right arm
- (Ontario) Thunder Bay's Strongest Man – Thunder Bay, ON, CAN – 1st place
- (Quebec) North America's Strongest Man 2014 – Warwick, QC, CAN – 4th place
- Ontario's Strongest Man 2014 – Thunder Bay, ON, CAN – 1st place
- (Saskatchewan) Adrenaline Pro Strongman – Regina, SK, CAN – 1st place

2013

- (Ontario) Dubreuilville Strongman Challenge PRO – Dubreuilville, ON, CAN – 5th place – injured – torn right calf
- (Quebec) North America's Strongest Man 2013 – Gatineau, QC, CAN – 11th place – injured – torn right calf
- Canada's Strongest Man 2013 – Quebec City, QC, CAN – 6th place
- (Saskatchewan) Saskatoon Ex – Frank's Red Hot Strongman2013 – Saskatoon, SK, CAN – 1st place
- (Ontario) Thunder Bay's Strongest Man 2013 – Thunder Bay, ON, CAN – 1st place
- (Quebec) Strongman Champions League Canada – North America's Strongest Man Challenge – Warwick, QC, CAN – 6th place
- Ontario's Strongest Man 2013 – Thunder Bay, ON, CAN – 4th place
- (Quebec) Strongman Champions League Canada – Force Supreme – Sherbrooke, QC, CAN – 9th place

2012

- (Ontario) Dubreuilville Strongman Challenge PRO – Dubreuilville, ON, CAN – 3rd place
- Canada's Strongest Man 2012 – Quebec City, Quebec, CAN – 6th place
- (Ontario) Thunder Bay's Strongest Man 2012 – Thunder Bay, ON, CAN – 1st place
- Ontario's Strongest Man 2012 – Kitchener, ON, CAN – 1st place
- (United States) Battle at the Beach II – Milwaukee, WI, USA – 3rd place (tie)
- (Ontario) Toronto Pro Strongman – Toronto, ON, CAN – 2nd place
- (Ontario) Fort Frances Pro Strongman 2012 – Fort Frances, ON, CAN – 2nd place
- (United States) World Amateur Strongman Championships 2012 – Columbus, OH, USA – 8th place

2011

- (Ontario) Dubreuilville Strongman Challenge PRO – Dubreuilville, ON, CAN – 3rd place
- (Saskatchewan) Saskatoon Ex Strongman 2011 – Saskatoon, SK, CAN – 1st place
- (Manitoba) Winkler Harvest Fest Strongman 2011 – Winkler, MB, CAN – 1st place
- (Ontario) Thunder Bay's Strongest Man 2011 – Thunder Bay, ON, CAN – 1st place
- (Ontario) Tbaytel Dryden Pro Strongman – Dryden, ON, CAN – 3rd place
- Ontario's Strongest Man 2011 – Toronto, ON, CAN – 5th place
- (Ontario) Fort Frances Strongman 2011 – Fort Frances, ON, CAN – 1st place
- (Manitoba) Teddy Bob's Strongman – Winnipeg, MB, CAN – 1st place

2010

- (Ontario) Bavarian Strongman Challenge – Kitchener, ON, CAN – 1st place
- (Ontario) Dubreuilville Strongman Challenge PRO – Dubreuilville, ON, CAN – 4th place
- (Manitoba) Winkler Harvest Fest Strongman – Winkler, MB, CAN – 1st place
- (Ontario) Motors & Muscles – Thunder Bay, ON, CAN – 2nd place
- Ontario's Strongest Man – Cornwall, ON, CAN – 3rd place
- (Ontario) Woodstock Strongman – Woodstock, ON, CAN – 1st place
- (United States) World Amateur Strongman Championships – Columbus, OH, USA – 22nd place

2009

- (Quebec) North America's Strongest Man – Gatineau, QC, CAN – 12th place. Injured – torn left biceps
- Canada's Strongest Man – Quebec City, QC, CAN – 8th place
- Quebec Cup – Cheneville Pro – Cheneville, QC, CAN – 8th place
- Ontario's Strongest Man – Kitchener, ON, CAN – 3rd place
- (Ontario) Rockbrune Bros Strongman – Barrie, ON, CAN – 1st place
- (Ontario) Woodstock Strongman – Woodstock, ON, CAN – 2nd place

2008

- (Ontario) Bavarian Strongman Challenge – Waterloo, ON, CAN – 3rd place
- (Ontario) Animal Strongman Series – FINALS – Woodstock, ON, CAN – 1st place
- (Ontario) Dubreuilville Strongman Challenge PRO – Dubreuilville, ON, CAN – 9th place. Injured – torn right ACL.
- (British Columbia) Canada's Strongest Man under 105 kg – Comox Valley, BC, CAN – 2nd place (tie)
- Ontario's Strongest Man – Wawa, ON, CAN – 6th place
- Ontario's Strongest Man Qualifier – Wawa, ON, CAN – 2nd place
- (Ontario) Power of Dads Strongman – Ottawa, ON, CAN – 3rd place
- (Ontario) Animal Strongman Series – 2nd Leg – Woodstock, ON, CAN – 1st place
- (Ontario) Animal Strongman Series – 1st Leg – Woodstock, ON, CAN – 8th place

2007

- (Ontario) Steel City Strength Challenge – Hamilton, ON, CAN – 2nd place
- (Ontario) Woodstock Strongman – novice – Woodstock, ON, CAN – 1st place
- Ontario's Strongest Man – Ottawa, ON, CAN – 9th place
