= Grant Connors =

Canadian strongman

- Born: Grant Connors; December 22, 1973 (age 51); Canada
- Occupation(s): Strongman, Powerlifting
- Height: 5 ft 11 in (1.80 m)
- Title: Atlantic Canada's Strongest Man
- Children: Casey Steven Connors; Mallory Nicole Rose Connors

Competition record

Strongman

Representing Canada

Canada's Strongest Man
6th	2005	
10th	2006	
10th	2007	
7th	2008	
6th	2009	

Atlantic Canada's Strongest Man
3rd	2002	
3rd	2003	
2nd	2004	
1st	2005	
1st	2006	
1st	2007	
1st	2008	
1st	2009	
1st	2010	
1st	2011	((CompetitionRecord(1st) 2012)) ((CompetitionRecord(1st) 2014)) ((CompetitionRecord(1st) 2015)) ((CompetitionRecord(1st) 2018)) ((CompetitionRecord(1st) 2019)) ((CompetitionRecord(1st) 2020))

Grant Connors (born December 22, 1973) is a powerlifter and professional strongman competitor from Canada. Grant is a 14 time winner of Atlantic Canada's Strongest Man, and has competed in Canada's Strongest Man on numerous occasions.

Grant, a native of Kentville, NS, set a Guinness world record in 2007 for the crucifix hold, with 30 pounds (14 kg) for 92.68 seconds.

== Personal Records ==
- Squat - 800 pounds (360 kg)
- Bench press - 750 pounds (340 kg)
- Deadlift - 825 pounds (374 kg)
