= Geoff Dolan (strongman) =

Canadian strongman competitor

Personal information
- Born: April 17, 1974 (age 52) Milden, Saskatchewan, Canada
- Occupation: Strongman
- Height: 6 ft 2.5 in (1.89 m)
Medal record
Strongman
Representing Canada
World's Strongest Man
10th	2003
Canada's Strongest Man
13th	1999
3rd	2000
4th	2001
4th	2002
3rd	2003
4th	2004
Western Canada's Strongest Man
2nd	2000
2nd	2001
1st	2002
1st	2003
2nd	2004
North America's Strongest Man
2nd	2001
Strongman Super Series
10th	2003 Canada Grand Prix
IFSA Strongman World Championships
10th	2005
Qualified	2006
IFSA Pan American Championships
4th	2005
IFSA Strongman World Team Championships
2nd	2005 Team Pan-America

Geoff Dolan (born April 17, 1974) is a Canadian strongman competitor.

== Strongman career ==
Dolan has competed in both the World's Strongest Man and IFSA strongman organizations, reaching the finals of the World's Strongest Man in 2003 finishing 10th, and the 2005 IFSA finals finishing again finishing 10th. Dolan suffered a severe finger injury during the final event of the 2005 IFSA Strongman World Championships, the Atlas Stones. Dolan accidentally pinched his little finger under one of the stones when placing it in the pillar, leaving the bone exposed and nearly severing the finger completely off. This resulted in him dropping several places and finishing in 10th place. Later that year Dolan competed with team Pan-America at the IFSA World Team Championships, finishing in 2nd place along with team mates Travis Ortmayer, Jon Andersen, and Van Hatfield. Dolan has competed in Canada's Strongest Man 5 times, finishing as high as 3rd place, as well as finishing in 2nd place at the 2001 North America's Strongest Man competition.

== Personal records ==
- Duck walk – 240 kg (529 lb) for 20m course in 11.97 seconds (2006 IFSA Dubai Grand Prix) (World Record)
