= 2003 World's Strongest Man =

Strongman competition in 2003

Competition information
- Dates: 20-28 September 2003
- Location: Victoria Falls
- Country: Zambia
- Athletes participating: 30
- Nations participating: 15

Champion(s)
- (Poland) Mariusz Pudzianowski

The 2003 World's Strongest Man was the 26th edition of World's Strongest Man and was won by Mariusz Pudzianowski from Poland. It was his second title, and Pudzianowski's record-setting score of 66 points in the Final eclipsed the previous record of 60. His margin of victory (20 points) was also a record. The contest was held at Victoria Falls, Zambia.

== Qualifying heats ==
=== Heat 1 ===
- Events: Farmer's Walk, Squat Lift with Barrels Machine, Train Pull, Atlas Stones, Log Lift Ladder, Tyre Flip

#	Name	Nationality	Pts
1	Mariusz Pudzianowski	Poland	32
2	Geoff Dolan	Canada	29
3	Peter Baltus	Netherlands	25
4	Adrian Rollinson	England	17
5	Igor Pedan	Russia	17
6	Jesse Marunde	United States	2 (injury)

=== Heat 2 ===
- Events: Carry & Flip (Duck Walk & Tyre Flip), Squat Lift with Barrels Machine, Train Pull, Giant Farmer's Walk, Atlas Stones, Tyre Flip

#	Name	Nationality	Pts
1	Zydrunas Savickas	Lithuania	29
2	Magnus Samuelsson	Sweden	27
3	René Minkwitz	Denmark	24
4	Don Pope	United States	22
5	Eddy Ellwood	England	13 (injury)
6	Heinz Ollesch	Germany	3 (injury)

Levi Vaoga was originally in this heat but could not go to Zambia, and he was replaced by Heinz Ollesch.

=== Heat 3 ===
- Events: Farmer's Walk, Train Pull, Car Dead Lift for reps, Atlas Stones, Log Lift Ladder, Tyre Flip

#	Name	Nationality	Pts
1	Raimonds Bergmanis	Latvia	30
2	Jarek Dymek	Poland	29.5
3	Phil Pfister	United States	24.5
4	Carl Broomfield	England	17.5
5	Jarno Hams	Netherlands	14
6	Jorgen Ljungberg	Sweden	8.5 (injury)

=== Heat 4 ===
- Events: Farmer's Walk, Squat Lift with Barrels Machine; Train Pull, Atlas Stones, Log Lift Ladder, Tyre Flip

#	Name	Nationality	Pts
1	Hugo Girard	Canada	30
2	Vasyl Virastyuk	Ukraine	27
3	Steve Kirit	United States	19
4	Vidas Blekaitis	Lithuania	18
5	Jón Valgeir Williams	Iceland	17
6	Glenn Ross	Northern Ireland	15

=== Heat 5 ===
- Events: Carry & Flip (Duck Walk & Tyre Flip), Train Pull, Giant Farmer's Walk, Car Dead Lift for reps, Atlas Stones, Tyre Flip

#	Name	Nationality	Pts
1	Svend Karlsen	Norway	32
2	Jessen Paulin	Canada	27
3	Mark Philippi	United States	22
4	Richard Gosling	England	19 (injury)
5	Franz Muellner	Austria	18
6	Malone Horn	South Africa	1 (injury)

Juha-Matti Räsänen was supposed to be in this heat but injured his bicep just before the contest. He was replaced by Malone Horn.

== Final results ==
#	Name	Nationality	Pts
1	Mariusz Pudzianowski	Poland	66
2	Zydrunas Savickas	Lithuania	46
3	Vasyl Virastyuk	Ukraine	43
4	Magnus Samuelsson	Sweden	40
5	Raimonds Bergmanis	Latvia	40
6	Jarek Dymek	Poland	38
7	Hugo Girard	Canada	34
8	Jessen Paulin	Canada	29
9	Svend Karlsen	Norway	28
10	Geoff Dolan	Canada	21

events: Carry & Drag (Duck Walk & Drag Chain & Anchor), Log Lift Ladder, Hercules Hold, Atlas Stones, Train Pull, Dead Lift with Barrels Machine, Farmer's Walk

Preceded by 2002 World's Strongest Man	2003 World's Strongest Man	Succeeded by 2004 World's Strongest Man
