= Steve Pulcinella =

American strongman (born 1965)

- Born: 19 October 1965 (age 59); Ridley Township, Pennsylvania, United States
- Occupation(s): Strength coach, strongman, powerlifter
- Employer: Iron Sport Gym (owner)
- Height: 6 ft 1 in (1.85 m)

Steve Pulcinella (born October 19, 1965) is an American former powerlifter, strongman, and Highland games competitor. He is the owner of Iron Sport Gym in Glenolden, Pennsylvania.

== Early life ==
Pulcinella was born and raised in Ridley Township, Pennsylvania, where he began strength training at his high school, Ridley High School in Folsom, Pennsylvania, with his cousin, bodybuilder Dave Pulcinella. He started training with weights at age 13 and competed in his first powerlifting meet at age 14. After graduating from Ridley in 1983, Pulcinella worked at his father's printing shop. Over the next 24 years, he supported his lifting career by doing pre-press work, sales, and customer service for the family business.

== Lifting career ==
Pulcinella began competing in powerlifting in 1981 and quickly earned a reputation for his large size and big lifts. He competed for about eight years, during which time he won four Pennsylvania State Powerlifting Championships, two Pennsylvania State Region II Powerlifting titles, and placed second in the USPF teenage national championships.

In the early 1990s, Pulcinella began training and competing as a professional strongman. In 1993, he won Virginia's Strongest Man and the North America's Strongest Man competition in Toronto, defeating 15 competitors in events including car deadlift, truck pull, and keg loading. In 1994, Pulcinella was invited to compete in the World's Strongest Man contest in South Africa, where he placed last in his group and did not qualify for the Finals.

Pulcinella stopped competing in Strongman when he became a Highland Games pro in 1995. At the height of his career, he was competing in over 20 Highland Games events every year. Pulcinella qualified annually for the U.S. National Highland Games contest, participated in more than 300 events around the world, and earned over 40 professional titles over the course of his career. In 2000, he won the International Pro Highland Games competition at Loon Mountain in Lincoln, New Hampshire against a strong field of top throwers. Pulcinella retired from competing in Highland Games in 2011 after a devastating knee injury at the Newport Oregon Highland Games in Newport, Oregon.

== Current career ==
In 1995, Pulcinella and his brother Joe opened Iron Sport Gym in Glenolden, Pennsylvania. Pulcinella manages and maintains the gym, works with clients, and - though he has retired from competition - still trains to maintain what he calls “recreational hugeness.” Outside of Iron Sport, Pulcinella regularly announces for regional Highland Games competitions, and serves as athletic director for the annual Celtic Classic in Bethlehem, Pennsylvania, which was highlighted in a January 2013 episode of the Travel Channel series Edge of America.

== Blogging and writing ==
Pulcinella is a featured contributor for EliteFTS, a strength training website and equipment resource founded by powerlifter Dave Tate. He has maintained a training log at EliteFTS.net since October 2010.

In 2012, Pulcinella published a strength training manual titled Iron Sport Strength Method that is available in both paper and electronic formats.

== See also ==
- List of strongmen
- List of strongman competitions
