= Gregg Ernst =

Canadian strength athlete (born 1961)

Personal information
- Born: Gregg Ernst; September 30, 1961 (age 64) (Canada) Lunenburg, Nova Scotia
- Occupation: Strongman Powerlifting
- Height: 6ft (1.83m )
Medal record
Strongman
Representing Canada
World's Strongest Man
6th	1991 World's Strongest Man
7th	1992 World's Strongest Man
Canada's Strongest Man
1st	1990
1st	1991
Nova Scotia Farmer's Walk
1st	1988
1st	1989
Powerlifting
Representing Canada
Atlantic Powerlifting Championships
1st	1982	+125kg
1st	1983	+125kg

Gregg Ernst (born September 30, 1961), is a former strongman competitor and powerlifter from Nova Scotia Canada.

== Strongman career ==
Ernst is best known for competing in the 1991 and 1992 World's Strongest Man competitions, finishing 6th and 7th respectively. Gregg began lifting at age 12 when his father bought him a set of weights for Christmas. By age 21, Ernst was a powerlifting world champion, winning the Atlantic Powerlifting Championships in 1982 and 1983. Gregg also won Canada's Strongest Man in 1990 & 1991, and the Nova Scotia Farmer's Walk in 1988 and 1989.

Gregg once backlifted 2,422 kg (5,340 lb) of two cars on a platform to set a world record for live weight backlifting in July 1993. This record still stands today. At the 1992 World's Strongest Man contest in Iceland, Ernst set a world record in the Husafell Stone carry, carrying the 186 kg (410 lb) stone 70.01 metres (229 ft 8 in), narrowly edging Andrés Guðmundsson's near two full revolutions around the original pen. The record stood for 25 years until the emergence of Hafþór Júlíus Björnsson.

Ernst is also a blacksmith and a beef farmer, plays several instruments, and sang professionally with his four oldest sons.

== Personal records ==
- Back lift – 2,422 kg (5,340 lb) (1993 Nova Scotia exhibition) (World Record)
- Deadlift – 363 kg (800 lb)
- Squat – 340 kg (750 lb)
- Bench Press – 231.5 kg (510 lb)
- Húsafell Stone carry – 186 kg (410 lb) for 70.01 metres (229 ft 8 in) (1992 World's Strongest Man) (former world record)
