= Fortissimus =

Defunct strength athletics event

- 2009
- The official logo of Fortissimus

Tournament information
- Location: Quebec, Canada
- Established: 2008
- Final year: 2009
- Number of tournaments: 2
- Format: Multi-event competition

Final champion
- (Lithuania) Zydrunas Savickas

The Fortissimus is a defunct event in strength athletics. The name means "the mightiest" and was a multi-event challenge at the end of which the winner is crowned as the "Strongest Man on Earth". It was set up to bring together the strongest competitors on the planet independent of the organisations to which they were signed, and also as a tribute to the nineteenth-century Canadian strongman Louis Cyr, which gave it many similarities to Le Defi Mark Ten International which last took place in Canada in the early 1990s. After its first airing in 2008, the strength athletics magazine Milo described it as the ultimate strongman competition. Despite a successful edition in 2009, a reported lack of a major sponsor for 2010 resulted in the competition being suspended, and no future contests have since been announced.

== History ==
The world of strength athletics in 2008 was fragmented, with a number of individuals being able to lay claim to be the strongest in the world by virtue of having won mutually exclusive events. Athletes affiliated to IFSA Strongman were not allowed to compete in the World's Strongest Man ("WSM"), which was produced by TWI and thus neither the WSM and its associated WSM Super Series nor the IFSA circuit can claim to have a comprehensive field of the top athletes. Some events did exist that bridged the divide between the major organisations, such as the Arnold Strongman Classic. Fortissimus was to be another such bridge but with a difference. The driving force behind the event, Paul Ohl, was one of the world's leading authorities on the great Louis Cyr, the nineteenth century strongman and wanted to create a competition to honour this man, said to have been the strongest man in the world. Fortissimus was set up to be the all-inclusive strength and power package to demonstrate "the essence of the sport of strongman is the multi-disciplinary array of tests of global strength, resulting from a combination of static (brute) strength, overall explosive power and power grip, strength athletics mastery, endurance and stamina". The concept was to link with the tradition of strongman and to honor the memory and deeds of the great Louis Cyr. Ten events, called the Classical Events, were incorporated into the programme.

The night before Day 1 of the 2008 event the athletes were honoured at a banquet hosted by Paul Ohl and was attended by the townspeople of Notre-Dame-du-Rosaire, where the event was being held, and the mayor of that town. Mayor Carl Dubé welcomed the athletes to Notre Dame du Rosaire in June 2008 and thousands of spectators flocked to see many of the world's top strongmen perform, including Zydrunas Savickas, Derek Poundstone, Andrus Murumets, Travis Ortmayer and Mikhail Koklyaev. The event was lauded across the strongman world, with the likes of Ironmind and Milo magazine praising it. So popular was it that a three-year deal with the Regional Community of Montmagny, Quebec was soon struck with the newly formed Fortissimus World Strength board. Derek Poundstone won the event in spectacular fashion. With the final event left, the Natural Stones of Strength, Zydrunas Savickas was 5 points clear of Poundstone. The three huge stone in the event were the 350 lb Bill Kazmaier stone, the 400 lb Paul Anderson stone and the giant 517 lb Louis Cyr stone. The winner would be the best time or most stones loaded. Some of the athletes lifted one stone, others the second. When it came to the third, the Cyr stone that only Louis Cyr had previously lifted over a century before, most athletes passed on it. Some touched it but did not attempt to lift it. Zydrunas Savickas, having lifted the first two in an astonishing 8.8 seconds, tried the Cyr stone but managed to lift it just one inch before deciding it was too much. Poundstone took 11 seconds over the first two stones, significantly quicker than all others except Savickas. Savickas is reported to have raised his hands in victory at seeing this time. However, his celebration was to have been premature. To the astonishment of the athletes, the crowd and even the organisers, Poundstone managed to move the stone. Screams of amazement were said to have come from the crowd. Inch by inch he raised the stone and eventually placed it on the platform. Later, Paul Ohl was to say to Derek Poundstone "You know, you weren't supposed to lift that stone. I put it in the competition as a tribute to Louis Cyr. Whoever is able to lift that stone would be considered an heir to Louis Cyr." Having lifted the fabled Cyr stone, Poundstone had the honour of having his name added to the stone, being the only man other than Cyr to lift the giant weight.

Paul Ohl involved the local community, including the regional press, to increase the presence of the event. The 2009 competition saw Marcel Catellier, the chief commissioner of the Regional Community of Montmagny, as chairman of the board, in charge of the general administration of the new corporation and Paul Ohl as president of the event.

Zydrunas Savickas reversed the results of 2008, where he came second, to clinch the title in 2009, with Poundstone coming second. Prior to the event, to further enhance the events standing a pre-tournament competition was held, the World Championship Rolling Thunder on June 26, an event which determined which athlete has the greatest grip strength in the world. Mark Felix successfully defended his title in this event.

The 2010 edition was suspended. Canada World Strength noted in a formal statement: "Since the precondition for the holding of a third edition resided mainly in the arrival of a major sponsor by early December and that this condition has not been reached, the organizers have no choice but to [suspend] the 2010 edition." However, the door was held open for 2011 with the statement continuing: "“The Board, however, does not abandon the idea of holding a third edition in 2011.".

=== Strongman Champions League Cooperation ===
In 2008 Paul Ohl stated that the Strongman Champions League was one of three organisations that had made an agreement with Fortissimus in order to unite the world strength community, the others being the American Strongman Corporation, and the Aussiepower organization. Within the agreement, Fortissimus, the competition that confers the title of "Strongest Man on the Planet", guaranteed that the winner of the America's Strongest Man title would be granted a slot in Fortissimus from 2009, as would the winner of the Australia's Strongest Man title. The agreement with the Strongman Champions League went further, stating that the top three athletes would have guaranteed places and in return the top Canadian athletes would have guaranteed selected participation in the Champions League. This later went further, guaranteeing the SCL its top five athletes would have places. The agreement was reemphasised in a joint statement from Marcel Mostert and Paul Ohl in early 2009.

== Events ==
Fortissimus regards the ten events that are incorporated in its programme as the Classical Events of strength athletics.

- Log lift
- Deadlift
- Yoke
- Farmer's walk
- Atlas Stones
- Natural stone lift
- Húsafell Stone carry
- Axle lift
- Louis Cyr dumbbell lift
- Power stairs
- Back Lift

== Trophy ==
From 2009 Fortissimus established that the title of the champion would be "The Strongest Man on Earth". The winner's trophy is a bronze statuette of Louis Cyr hoisting the huge 273 ¼ lbs dumbbell that brought him fame on the evening of 19 January 1892 at London's Royal Aquarium. It was crafted by renowned Canadian sculptor Michel Binette with the original displayed at the Inverness Bronze Museum, in Inverness, Quebec, Canada.

== Results ==
=== 2008 ===
Dates: 28, 29 June 2008

Notre-Dame-du-Rosaire, Quebec, Canada

#	Name	Nationality	Pts
1	Derek Poundstone	(United States)	119
2	Zydrunas Savickas	(Lithuania)	118
3	Sebastian Wenta	(Poland)	84.25
4	Louis-Philippe Jean	(Canada)	83.5
5	Travis Ortmayer	(United States)	76.5
6	Mikhail Koklyaev	(Russia)	76.5
7	Mark Felix	(United Kingdom)	67.5
8	Stefan Solvi Petursson	(Iceland)	63.75
9	Andrus Murumets	(Estonia)	62
10	Christian Savoie	(Canada)	42.5
11	Arild Haugen	(Norway)	40.5
12	Ervin Katona	(Serbia)	36.5
13	Dominic Filiou	(Canada)	25.5

=== 2009 ===
Dates: 27, 28 June 2009

Montmagny, Canada

#	Name	Nationality	Pts
1	Zydrunas Savickas	(Lithuania)	124.5
2	Derek Poundstone	(United States)	118
3	Brian Shaw	(United States)	106.5
4	Travis Ortmayer	(United States)	94
5	Mikhail Koklyaev	(Russia)	84
6	Phil Pfister	(United States)	82
7	Andrus Murumets	(Estonia)	74
8	Louis-Philippe Jean	(Canada)	73.5
9	Terry Hollands	(United Kingdom)	55.5
10	Mark Felix	(United Kingdom)	54
11	Christian Savoie	(Canada)	49
12	Agris Kazelniks	(Latvia)	47
13	Jimmy Marku	(United Kingdom)	32
14	Derek Boyer	(Fiji) / (Australia)	24

== Fortissimus Strongman of the Year ==
This is not the Fortissimus competition title but a recognition of the achievements of a particular strongman over the previous year.

=== 2008 ===
(Poland) Mariusz Pudzianowski

=== 2009 ===
(Lithuania) Zydrunas Savickas

== Fortissimus Lifetime Achievement Award ==
The Fortissimus Lifetime Achievement Award is given to recognize the greatest strongman athletes in the history of the sport, both past and present athletes are eligible for this title.

=== 2009 ===
(Iceland) Magnus Ver Magnusson
