= 2004 World's Strongest Man =

Strongman competition in 2004

Competition information
- Dates: 23 September - 3 October 2004
- Location: Nassau
- Country: Bahamas
- Athletes participating: 34
- Nations participating: 13

Champion(s)
- (Ukraine) Vasyl Virastyuk

The 2004 World's Strongest Man was the 27th edition of World's Strongest Man and was won by Vasyl Virastyuk from Ukraine. It was his first title after finishing third the previous year. Zydrunas Savickas from Lithuania finished second for the third year in a row. Originally Mariusz Pudzianowski from Poland finished third, but was later disqualified after testing positive for a banned substance, thus third place was given to Magnus Samuelsson from Sweden. The contest was held in Nassau, Bahamas. The qualifying heats saw a major format change, going from the traditional 5-6 man heats with the top 2 going to the finals. This year's format was a 12-man round-robin competition taking place over 5 days, with the top six going onto the finals.

== Qualifying heats ==
- Events: Deadlift with Barrels Machine, Squat Lift with Barrels Machine, Safe Lift for reps, Truck Pull, Super Yoke, Giant Farmer's Walk, Carry & Drag (Carry an Anchor & Drag Chain & Anchor), Fingal's Fingers, Wrestling, Stone Circle, Atlas Stones

#	Name	Nationality	Points
1	Vasyl Virastyuk	Ukraine	55
2	Mariusz Pudzianowski	Poland	55
3	Zydrunas Savickas	Lithuania	54
4	Raimonds Bergmanis	Latvia	50
5	Magnus Samuelsson	Sweden	49
6	Svend Karlsen	Norway	48
7	Tomi Lotta	Finland	46
8	Andrus Murumets	Estonia	40 (replaced Steve Kirit)
9	Brian Turner	United Kingdom	39 (replaced Hugo Girard)
10	Mark Felix	Grenada	37
11	Adrian Rollinson	England	34
12	René Minkwitz	Denmark	31
-	Hugo Girard	Canada	Withdrew due to injury
-	Steve Kirit	United States	Withdrew due to injury

== Final results ==
#	Name	Nationality	Pts
1	Vasyl Virastyuk	Ukraine	37
2	Zydrunas Savickas	Lithuania	36
3	Magnus Samuelsson	Sweden	29
4	Raimonds Bergmanis	Latvia	19
5	Svend Karlsen	Norway	9 (Injured)
x	Mariusz Pudzianowski	Poland	Disqualified

Events: Carry Race (Carry an Anchor & Giant Farmer's Walk), Fridge Carry (Super Yoke), Squat Lift with Barrels Machine, Car Deadlift for reps, Safe Lift for reps, Truck Pull, Wheelbarrow Race, Atlas Stones

Preceded by 2003 World's Strongest Man	2004 World's Strongest Man	Succeeded by 2005 World's Strongest Man
