= Ginaud Dupuis =

French-Canadian strongman (born 1964)

Personal information
- Nationality: Canadian
- Born: 11 September 1964 (age 61)
- Height: 6 ft 2 in (188 cm)
- Weight: 138 kg (304 lb)

Sport
- Sport: Strongman and Powerlifting
Medal record
Strongman
Representing Canada
World's Strongest Man
Qualified	1997 World's Strongest Man
Qualified	1998 World's Strongest Man
World Strongman Challenge
12th	1995 World Strongman Challenge
Canada's Strongest Man
1st	1997 Canada's Strongest Man
3rd	1999 Canada's Strongest Man
4th	2000 Canada's Strongest Man
Quebec's Strongest Man
2nd	1999 Quebec's Strongest Man
3rd	2000 Quebec's Strongest Man
Powerlifting
Representing Canada
WPA World Powerlifting Championships
1st	1994

Ginaud Dupuis (born 11 September 1964) is a French-Canadian strongman, notable for twice appearance at the World's Strongest Man.

== Strength athlete career ==
Dupuis started his career as a powerlifter, becoming a WPA World Champion in 1994 (under 140 kg category, equipped division). After that, he started to compete in strongman, placed twelfth at 1995 World Strongman Challenge.

In 1997, he wins the title of Canada's Strongest Man and invited to compete at the World's Strongest Man. At 1998 World's Strongest Man, he appears with peak bodyweight of 138 kg.

In 2000, Dupuis placed fourth at the Canada's Strongest Man and retired from the strength sports.

In 2001, he plays role of a strong man in Alegría, Cirque du Soleil touring production. After that, Dupuis went on service in Canada's army.

Outside of strongman, Ginaud worked as powerlifting coach in Aylmer and helps to Canadian filmmaker and mountaineer Elia Saikaly find himself in life.
