= 2006 World's Strongest Man =

Strongman competition in 2006

Competition information
- Dates: 14–23 September 2006
- Location: Sanya
- Country: China
- Athletes participating: 25
- Nations participating: 14

Champion(s)
- (United States) Phil Pfister

The 2006 Met-Rx World's Strongest Man was the 29th edition of World's Strongest Man and was won by Phil Pfister, the first American to win the competition since Bill Kazmaier in 1982. The contest took place between the 14th and 23 September 2006, in Sanya, China.

The 25 competitors in the World's Strongest Man qualified through the World's Strongest Man Super Series. The Super Series consist of exclusive Grand Prix events produced all over the world.

== Format ==
The 25 competitors were split into five separate heats, each consisting of six events. After each event each competitor was given points, from 5 for first to 1 for last. Half points occurred if more than one competitor had the same result, and no points were scored if a competitor did not take part in an event. The points were tallied after the six events and the two competitors with the most points from each heat progressed to the final. The final consisted of seven events and the champion was the competitor with the most points after all of the events.

The Head referee was Colin Bryce, assisted by Svend Karlsen (the 2001 World's Strongest Man). Jouko Ahola, World's Strongest Man winner from 1997 and 1999, was the equipment manager.

== Events ==
There were a total of 11 different events used in the competition:

- Farmer's Walk
- Keg Toss
- Car Dead Lift
- Car Walk
- Overhead Stone Lift
- Barrel Loading Race
- Cannonball Carry & Sledge Drag
- Fingal Fingers
- Power Stairs
- Bus Pull
- Atlas Stones

== Qualifying heats ==
=== Heat 1 ===
#	Name	Nationality	Pts
1	Mariusz Pudzianowski	Poland	25
2	Don Pope	United States	18.5
3	Arild Haugen	Norway	16
3	Reza Gharaei	Iran	16
5	Jessen Paulin	Canada	11.5

=== Heat 2 ===
#	Name	Nationality	Pts
1	Terry Hollands	England	22.5
2	Raivis Vidzis	Latvia	21.5
3	Jesse Marunde	United States	20.5
4	David Ostlund	United States	19.5
5	Gu Yan Li	China	5

=== Heat 3 ===
#	Name	Nationality	Pts
1	Phil Pfister	United States	21.5
2	Mark Felix	Grenada	18
3	Janne Virtanen	Finland	17.5
4	Elbrus Nigmatullin	Russia	17
5	Darren Sadler	England	16

=== Heat 4 ===
#	Name	Nationality	Pts
1	Tarmo Mitt	Estonia	21
2	Jarek Dymek	Poland	20.5
3	Boris Haraldsson	Iceland	19
4	Dominic Filiou	Canada	16
5	Kevin Nee	United States	12.5

=== Heat 5 ===
#	Name	Nationality	Pts
1	Sebastian Wenta	Poland	26.5
2	Sławomir Toczek	Poland	23
3	Josh Thigpen	United States	17
4	Odd Haugen	Norway	10.5
5	Magnus Samuelsson	Sweden	8 (Inj.)

== Final ==
Mariusz Pudzianowski, the reigning champion, started well in the final. He was joint first with Mark Felix in the Dead Lift, with 16 lifts and won the power stairs in 26.33 seconds, almost 8 seconds faster than second placed Tarmo Mitt. The power stairs proved a tough task for others though, Raivis Vidzis coped the worst but managed to carry on. In the 3rd event, the overhead stone lift, Phil Pfister dominated and lifted all 4 stones, while no other competitor could lift more than 2. The top 5 after the first day of the final was:

#	Name	Nationality	Pts
1	Mariusz Pudzianowski	Poland	28.5
2	Mark Felix	Grenada	21.5
3	Phil Pfister	United States	21
4	Tarmo Mitt	Estonia	17
5	Don Pope	United States	17

Pfister dramatically closed the gap to Pudzianowski in the 2 events on day 2 of the final as he won both of them. Pudzianowski struggled to 6th in the Fingal Fingers, while Pfister set a world record time of 5 fingers in 31.92 seconds. Remarkably, in the bus pull, none of the 10 finalists successfully finished the course, but Pfister managed to pull his bus just 12 centimetres further than Pudzianowski to win the event, leaving himself 1.5 points behind the Polish athlete. The top 5 after the second day of the final was:

#	Name	Nationality	Pts
1	Mariusz Pudzianowski	Poland	42.5
2	Phil Pfister	United States	41
3	Don Pope	United States	32
4	Mark Felix	Grenada	30.5
5	Tarmo Mitt	Estonia	27

Despite having won 3 events in a row, many people expected Pfister to struggle in the Car Walk given how poorly he had performed with the equipment in training. Moreover, once Pudzianowski had set a blistering time of 27.4 seconds, no-one expected Pfister to get anywhere close to him, but to everyone's amazement, Pfister somehow managed to win the event by over half a second, meaning the 2006 WSM would go right down to the wire in the Atlas Stones. With just half a point separating them, they would be drawn to compete together as the very final pairing. As two of the best stone-lifters in the final, it was not a question of who managed to lift all five stones, but which of the two could manage it in the fastest time. The Atlas Stones proved to be extremely tight but Pudzianowski managed to gain a slight lead by the fourth stone. However, by taking a more angled stance on the final stone compared to Pudzianowski's more standard front-on technique which required him to shuffle a couple of steps towards the platform, Pfister managed to lift his stone and placed it on the platform in one movement, doing so a fraction of a second before Pudzianowski. The Pole, clearly stunned that he had been beaten, did not even correctly place the stone in the platform's groove and simply walked away in disgust as Pfister let out a great celebratory roar. Don Pope recovered well to finish 3rd having come last in the first event. The final results:

#	Name	Nationality	Pts
1	Phil Pfister	United States	61
2	Mariusz Pudzianowski	Poland	57.5
3	Don Pope	United States	45
4	Mark Felix	Grenada	38.5
5	Tarmo Mitt	Estonia	38
6	Sebastian Wenta	Poland	36.5
7	Terry Hollands	England	30
8	Jarek Dymek	Poland	29
9	Raivis Vidzis	Latvia	26
10	Sławomir Toczek	Poland	20.5

== References and descriptions ==
Preceded by 2005 World's Strongest Man	2006 World's Strongest Man	Succeeded by 2007 World's Strongest Man
