= Christian Savoie =

Canadian strongman

Personal information
- Born: 25 March 1976 (age 50) Val-Joli, Quebec, Canada
- Occupation: Strongman
- Height: 6 ft 4 in (1.93 m)
Medal record
Strongman
Representing Canada
World's Strongest Man
Qualified	2009 World's Strongest Man
Qualified	2010 World's Strongest Man
North America's Strongest Man
2nd	2008
1st	2009
1st	2010
1st	2011
Canada's Strongest Man
3rd	2008
1st	2009
1st	2010
2nd	2011

Christian Savoie (born 25 March 1976) is a leading Canadian strongman competitor and entrant to the World's Strongest Man competition on multiple occasions.

== Biography ==
Christian was born in Quebec, known as the "cradle of strongmen", and resides in Sherbrooke, Quebec. Christian Savoie works full-time as a butcher outside of strongman.

== Strongman career ==
Christian began competing in strongman at the age of 25. His first victory came in 2008 when he won the Quebec cup. Also that year he came third in Canada's Strongest Man, and placed second in North America's Strongest Man.

In 2009 Christian won North America's Strongest Man, and a first-place finish in Canada's Strongest Man secured him an invite to the 2009 World's Strongest Man contest.

Christian again won North America's Strongest Man, and qualified for the 2010 World's Strongest Man contest.

Christian placed second at the 2011 Canada's Strongest Man, and won North America's Strongest Man for the third consecutive year.

During the competitions at Warwick in 2014, Christian tore his ligaments in both of his legs while carrying the Conan wheel around his socket. This put an end to his career.

Measurements:

- height 6 ft 4 in (1.93 m)
- weight 310 pounds (140 kg)

== Strongman record ==
- 2005
  - 5. – Canada's Strongest Man
- 2006
  - 4. – Canada's Strongest Man
- 2007
  - Competed in – Strongman Super Series: Venice Beach
  - 5. – Canada's Strongest Man
  - 7. – North America's Strongest Man
  - 7. – World Strongman Cup Federatio – Grand Prix of Khanty-Mansijsk
- 2008
  - 1. – Quebec Cup – Strongman series
  - 2. – Quebec's Strongest Man
  - 3. – Canada's Strongest Man
  - 2. – North America's Strongest Man
  - 10. – Fortissimus
- 2009
  - 11. – Fortissimus
  - 1. – Canada's Strongest Man
  - 1. – North America's Strongest Man
  - Q. – World's Strongest Man 2009, Malta
- 2010
  - 1. – North America's Strongest Man
  - Q. – World's Strongest Man 2010, Sun City
