= 2005 World's Strongest Man =

Strongman competition in 2005

Competition information
- Dates: 27 September - 6 October 2005
- Location: Chengdu
- Country: China
- Athletes participating: 25
- Nations participating: 14

Champion(s)
- (Poland) Mariusz Pudzianowski

The 2005 World's Strongest Man was the 28th edition of World's Strongest Man and was won by Mariusz Pudzianowski from Poland, his third title. Jesse Marunde from the United States finished second, and Dominic Filiou from Canada third. Two of Pudzianowski's primary competitors in previous WSM competitions, the defending champion, Vasyl Virastyuk, and the runner-up, Zydrunas Savickas, had moved to the competing IFSA World Championships, leaving him with a relatively easier path. The contest was held at Chengdu, China.

== Qualifying heats ==
=== Heat 1 ===
#	Name	Nationality	Pts
1	Jarek Dymek	Poland	23.5
2	Dominic Filiou	Canada	21.5
3	Josh Thigpen	United States	18
4	Raivis Vidzis	Latvia	17
5	Mick Gosling	England	8

=== Heat 2 ===
#	Name	Nationality	Pts
1	Ralf Ber	Austria	22.5
2	Elbrus Nigmatullin	Russia	22
3	Boris Haraldsson	Iceland	21.5
4	Mark Philippi	United States	18
5	Sol Bathaiee	Iran	6

=== Heat 3 ===
#	Name	Nationality	Pts
1	Mariusz Pudzianowski	Poland	25
2	Don Pope	United States	22.5
3	Mykhaylo Starov	Ukraine	18.5
4	Steve Bourgeois	Canada	16
5	Brian Irwin	Northern Ireland	8

=== Heat 4 ===
#	Name	Nationality	Pts
1	Janne Virtanen	Finland	20.5
2	Dave Ostlund	United States	20
3	Jessen Paulin	Canada	17
4	Kevin Nee	United States	16.5
5	Sławomir Toczek	Poland	16

=== Heat 5 ===
#	Name	Nationality	Pts
1	Jesse Marunde	United States	26
2	Tarmo Mitt	Estonia	21
3	Terry Hollands	England	20
4	Carl Waitoa	New Zealand	17
5	Gu Yan Li	China	6

== Final results ==
#	Name	Nationality	Pts
1	Mariusz Pudzianowski	Poland	60
2	Jesse Marunde	United States	46
3	Dominic Filiou	Canada	42
4	Jarek Dymek	Poland	37.5
5	Janne Virtanen	Finland	37
6	Tarmo Mitt	Estonia	34
7	Ralf Ber	Austria	33.5
8	Don Pope	United States	33
9	Dave Ostlund	United States	32
10	Elbrus Nigmatullin	Russia	30

Preceded by 2004 World's Strongest Man	2005 World's Strongest Man	Succeeded by 2006 World's Strongest Man
