= Dominic Filiou =

Canadian strongman (1977–2019)

Personal information
- Born: February 27, 1977 Canada
- Died: January 2, 2019 (aged 41)
- Occupation: Strongman
- Height: 6 ft 5 in (196 cm)
- Weight: 408 lb (185 kg)
- Spouse: Melanie Filiou
- Children: 2
Medal record
Strongman
Representing Canada
World's Strongest Man
3rd	2005 World's Strongest Man
Qualified	2006 World's Strongest Man
Qualified	2007 World's Strongest Man
Arnold Strongman Classic
9th	2006 Arnold Strongman Classic
World Strongman Cup
13th	2005 Russia
6th	2006 Latvia
4th	2006 Northern Ireland
5th	2006 Germany
10th	2007 Latvia
12th	2007 Moscow
North America's Strongest Man
12th	2007
Canada's Strongest Man
7th	2000
5th	2001
5th	2002
11th	2003
3rd	2005
2nd	2006
1st	2007
Quebec's Strongest Man
2nd	2000
3rd	2001
3rd	2002
1st	2003
4th	2004
2nd	2005
2nd	2006
1st	2007

Dominic Filiou (February 27, 1977 – January 2, 2019) was a Canadian strongman of Greek ancestry. Filiou was best known for competing in the 2005, 2006, and 2007 World's Strongest Man competitions. In 2005 he finished third in the finals, becoming the first Canadian to podium at World's Strongest Man since Tom Magee in 1982. In 2006 and 2007 he was eliminated during the qualifying heats. He was the 2007 winner of Canada's Strongest Man making him the first man to defeat Hugo Girard on Canadian soil (Girard was still recovering from a knee operation 14 months prior to the competition). He died of a heart attack on January 2, 2019.

== Personal records ==
- Firetruck pull – 20,412 kg (45,001 lb) for 24 meter course in 33.18 seconds (2007 Canada's Strongest Man) (World Record)

== Personal life ==
Filiou was married to Melanie and has five children.
