= Dubreuilville =

- Township (single-tier)
- Township of Dubreuilville; Canton de Dubreuilville
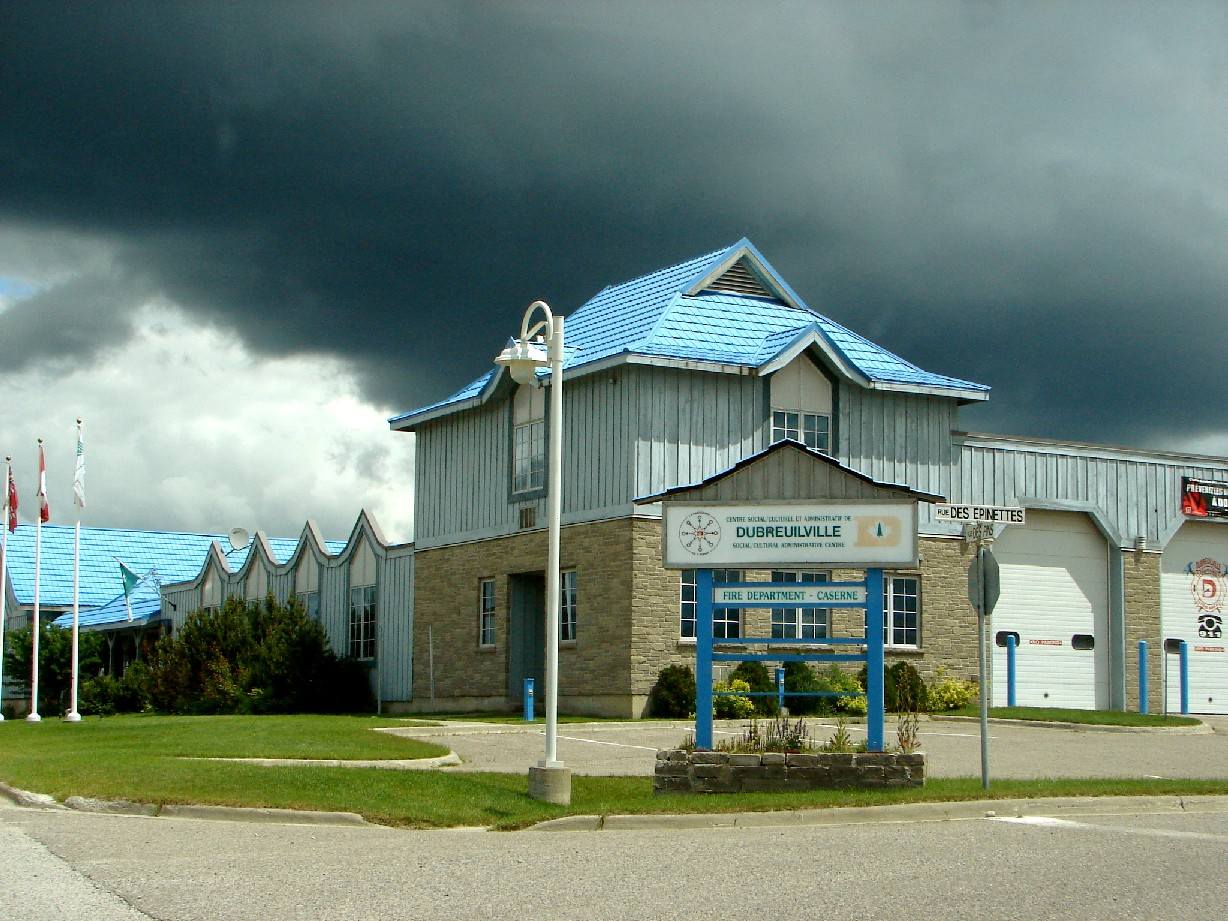
- Dubreuilville Cultural centre and fire station

- Location within Ontario
- Coordinates: 48°21′N 84°33′W
- Country: Canada
- Province: Ontario
- District: Algoma
- Established: 1961
- Incorporated: 1977

Government
  - Type: Township
  - Mayor: Beverly Nantel
  - Fed. riding: Sault Ste. Marie—Algoma
  - Prov. riding: Algoma—Manitoulin

Area
  - Land: 87.53 km^{2} (33.80 sq mi)

Population (2021)
  - Total: 576
  - Density: 6.6/km^{2} (17/sq mi)
- Time zone: UTC-5 (EST)
  - Summer (DST): UTC-4 (EDT)
- Postal Code: P0S 1B0
- Area codes: 705, 249
- Website: dubreuilville.ca

Dubreuilville is a township in the Canadian province of Ontario, located in the Algoma District. Established as a company town in 1961 by the Dubreuil Brothers (Napoléon, Joachim, Augustin et Marcel Dubreuil) lumber company, Dubreuilville was incorporated as a municipality in 1977.

The town is located along the Algoma Central Railway, on Highway 519, 32 kilometres (20 mi) east of Highway 17. The turnoff from Highway 17 is located 40 kilometres (25 mi) north from the town of Wawa and 45 kilometres (28 mi) south of the town of White River.

Dubreuilville sponsored Canada's Strongest Man contests in 2015 and 2016.

== History ==
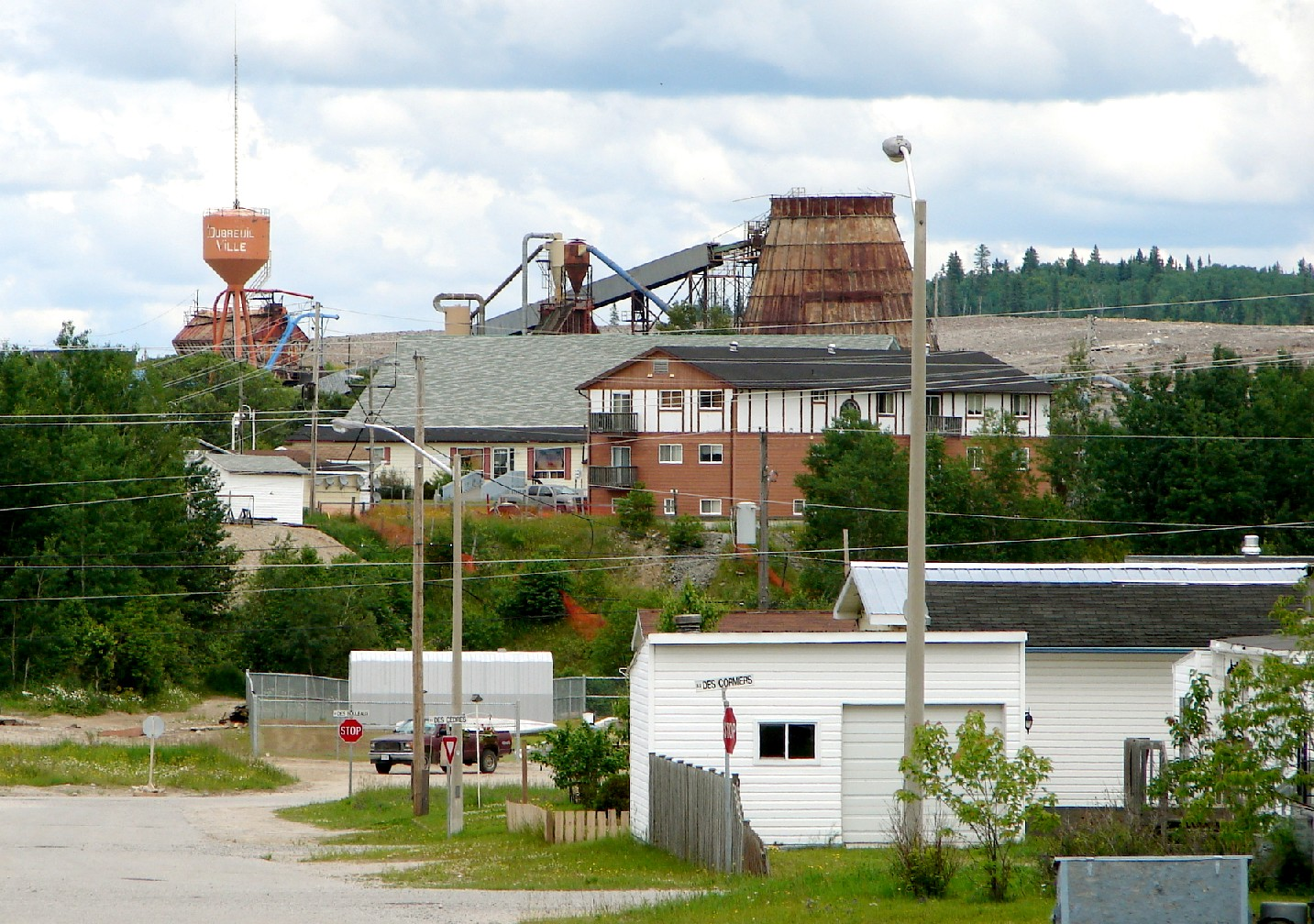
Dubreuilville with sawmill in the background

Dubreuilville was founded as a company town in 1961, by the Dubreuil Brothers and their employees, originally from Taschereau, Quebec. They obtained logging rights in the area, built a sawmill, and relocated their operations, including houses, from their previous site on the Magpie River to the new town site upstream on the Magpie River where it meets the Algoma Central Railway. In 1962, the road connecting the town to Highway 17 was built.

In 1977, Dubreuilville was incorporated as a township municipality. No longer a closed company town, its houses were sold to the sawmill employees, and municipal infrastructure was built, such as a school, arena, medical clinic, water and waste water facilities.

In 1988, the sawmill was sold to Jean-Paul Dubreuil, son of one of the original founders, and sold again in 1989 to Buchanan and James River Paper. In November 2008, the sawmill shutdown due to poor economic conditions in the industry. Since then, the town has relied on gold mining operations in the area, as well as on tourism.

== Demographics ==
In the 2021 Census of Population conducted by Statistics Canada, Dubreuilville had a population of 576 living in 248 of its 284 total private dwellings, a change of −6% from its 2016 population of 613. With a land area of 87.53 km^{2} (33.80 sq mi), it had a population density of 6.6/km^{2} (17.0/sq mi) in 2021.

Canada census – Dubreuilville community profile

	2021	2016	2011
Population	576 (-6.0% from 2016)	613 (-3.5% from 2011)	635 (-17.9% from 2006)
Land area	87.53 km^{2} (33.80 sq mi)	89.50 km^{2} (34.56 sq mi)	89.57 km^{2} (34.58 sq mi)
Population density	6.6/km^{2} (17/sq mi)	6.8/km^{2} (18/sq mi)	7.1/km^{2} (18/sq mi)
Median age	44.4 (M: 46.4, F: 41.6)	40.4 (M: 41.1, F: 39.6)
Private dwellings	284 (total) 248 (occupied)	310 (total)	310 (total)
Median household income	$96,000	$84,224

References: 2021 2016 2011

Historical census populations – Dubreuilville

Year	Pop.	±%
1976	818	—
1981	988	+20.8%
1986	988	+0.0%
1991	983	−0.5%
1996	990	+0.7%

Year	Pop.	±%
2001	967	−2.3%
2006	773	−20.1%
2011	635	−17.9%
2016	613	−3.5%
2021	576	−6.0%

Source: Statistics Canada

Mother tongue (2021):

- English as first language: 16.4%
- French as first language: 79.3%
- English and French as first languages: 2.6%
- Other as first language: 0.9%

== See also ==
- List of townships in Ontario
- List of francophone communities in Ontario
