= Phil Pfister =

American strongman (born 1971)

Personal information
- Nationality: American
- Born: May 15, 1971 (age 55) Charleston, West Virginia, United States
- Occupation: Strongman
- Height: 198 cm (6 ft 6 in)
- Children: 2
Medal record
Strongman
Representing United States
World's Strongest Man
4th	1998 World's Strongest Man
5th	2000 World's Strongest Man
4th	2001 World's Strongest Man
Qualified	2003 World's Strongest Man
1st	2006 World's Strongest Man
4th	2007 World's Strongest Man
4th	2008 World's Strongest Man
7th	2009 World's Strongest Man
Strongest Man Alive
2nd	1999
Arnold Strongman Classic
3rd	2002 Arnold Strongman Classic
5th	2003 Arnold Strongman Classic
4th	2006 Arnold Strongman Classic
4th	2007 Arnold Strongman Classic
7th	2008 Arnold Strongman Classic
5th	2009 Arnold Strongman Classic
7th	2010 Arnold Strongman Classic
America's Strongest Man
2nd	2000
2nd	2001
2nd	2003
2nd	2004
IFSA Pan-American Championships
1st	2005
IFSA World Championships
6th	2005
World Strongman Challenge/Beauty and the Beast
2nd	2001
Hawaii's Strongest Man
2nd	2005

Phil Pfister (/ˈfɪstər/ FIS-tər; born May 15, 1971) is an American former strongman competitor. He is the winner of the 2006 World's Strongest Man competition held in Sanya, China and was the first American to win since Bill Kazmaier in 1982.

Prior to 2006, Pfister's previous best finishes in the World's Strongest Man were fourth place in 1998 in Tangier, and fourth place again in 2001 in Victoria Falls. He placed fourth at the 2007 and 2008 WSM contests, and seventh in 2009.

While qualifying for his 4th-place finish in Victoria Falls, during an event known as the Hercules Hold, Pfister made a verbal promise that he would be the man responsible for bringing the World's Strongest Man title back to the United States. He went on to set two qualifier records in the Hercules Hold and in the Atlas Stones, but was unable to contend in the finals against the Scandinavian competitors who took the podium finishes that year, Magnus Samuelsson from Sweden, Janne Virtanen from Finland, and Svend Karlsen from Norway, respectively. Pfister has also achieved a podium finish at the Arnold Strongman Classic when he came third in 2002. During 2009 Arnold Strongman Classic he loaded a 240 kg (529 lb) Manhood Stone (Max Atlas Stone) over a 4 ft bar.

After retirement, Pfister became a commentator for the World's Strongest Man competition on ESPN2 along with Bill Kazmaier and Todd Harris from 2010 to 2012.

== Personal records ==
- Manhood Stone (Max Atlas Stone) – 240 kg (529 lb) over 4 ft (48 in) bar (2009 Arnold Strongman Classic)
- Deadlift hold (no straps) – 250 kg (551 lb) for 74.75 seconds (1998 Strongest Man Alive) (World Record)
- Deadlift hold (no straps) – 240 kg (529 lb) for 91.50 seconds (2001 Beauty and the Beast) (World Record)
- Keg toss – 20 kg (44 lb) over 5.18 metres (17 ft 0 in) (2000 and 2001 Beauty and the Beast) [achieved twice]
- Trolley Pull – 13,000 kg (28,660 lb) for 25 meter course in 24.97 seconds (2000 Beauty and the Beast) (World Record)

== Personal life ==
Pfister worked as a firefighter and currently resides in Charleston, West Virginia with his son Wyatt. He appeared in the 2005 film The Protector starring Tony Jaa, as one of the Fortune Teller's henchmen. He also made an appearance on Are You Smarter Than a Fifth Grader? on April 17, 2008 and won $25,000, as well as an appearance on an episode of Airline.

Preceded by Mariusz Pudzianowski	World's Strongest Man; 2006	Succeeded by Mariusz Pudzianowski
