= Hugo Girard =

Canadian strongman (born 1971)

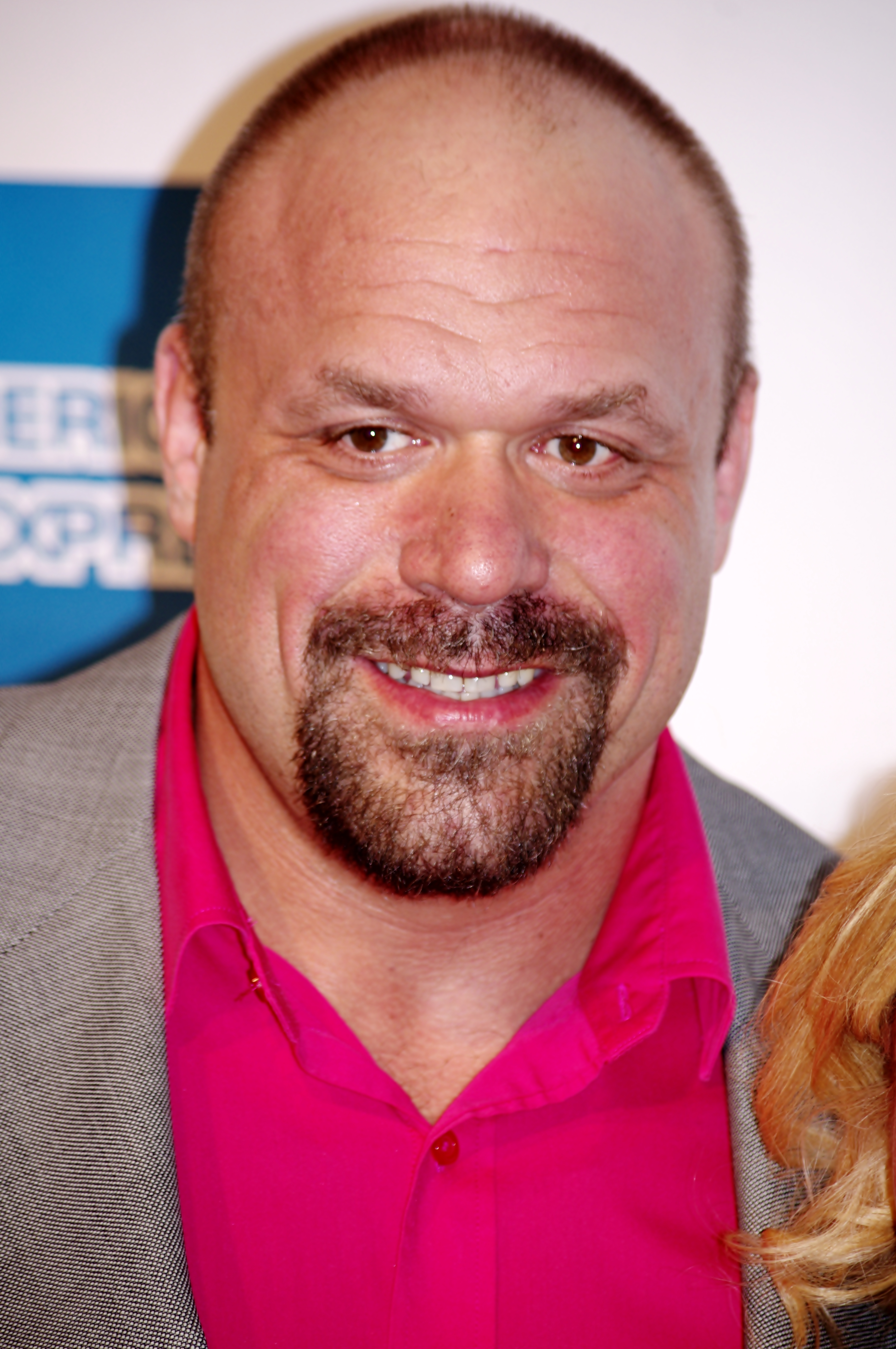

Personal information
- Born: December 20, 1971 (age 54) Sainte-Anne-de-Portneuf, Quebec, Canada
- Occupation: Strongman
- Height: 6 ft 0 in (1.83 m)
Medal record
Strongman
Representing Canada
World's Strongest Man
10th	1998 World's Strongest Man
4th	1999 World's Strongest Man
9th	2000 World's Strongest Man
6th	2001 World's Strongest Man
7th	2002 World's Strongest Man
7th	2003 World's Strongest Man
Qualified	2004 World's Strongest Man
World Muscle Power Classic
1st	1999 World Muscle Power Classic
1st	2001 World Muscle Power Classic
2nd	2002 World Muscle Power Classic
1st	2003 World Muscle Power Classic
1st	2004 World Muscle Power Classic
Arnold Strongman Classic
9th	2005 Arnold Strongman Classic
Strongman Super Series
1st	2001 Czech Grand Prix
2nd	2001 Stockholm Grand Prix
2nd	2001 Overall
2nd	2002 Aberdeen Grand Prix
1st	2002 Sweden Grand Prix
1st	2002 Hawaii Grand Prix
1st	2002 Overall Champion
1st	2003 Canada Grand Prix
1st	2003 Finland Grand Prix
World Strongman Challenge
1st	2002
North America's Strongest Man
1st	2001
1st	2002
Canada's Strongest Man
1st	1999
1st	2000
1st	2001
1st	2002
1st	2003
1st	2004
3rd	2007
Quebec's Strongest Man
1st	2008

Hugo Girard (born December 20, 1971) is a Canadian former strongman. He is a Strongman Super Series world Champion, a four-time World Muscle Power champion and a six-time Canada's Strongest Man. With 15 international competition wins, he's the tenth most decorated strongman in history.

== Strength career ==
Prior to his career as a strongman competitor, Girard worked as a bouncer in a popular Quebec City nightclub on weekends while attending community college. In the early 1990s, he went to Los Angeles in order to either pursue a career as a professional bodybuilder or as an actor. After a few months, Girard came back to the province of Quebec where he was later hired as a police officer for the city of Gatineau.

Girard focused on Strongman competition, and became a 6-time consecutive finalist in the World's Strongest Man competition from 1998-2004. Girard's highest placing was 4th place at the 1999 World's Strongest Man contest.

In 2002 Girard reached the high point of his career to date, winning the 2002 Strongman Super Series overall title. Girard has also won the World Muscle Power Championships 4 times, in 1999, 2001, 2003, and 2004.

Girard dominated strongman competition in Canada for several years. He was the Canada's Strongest Man champion from 1999 to 2004. He was also the North America's Strongest Man champion in 2001 and 2002.

Beginning in 2004, injuries began to plague his career including back to back injuries to his achilles tendon in 2005, the first of which took place at the 2005 Arnold Strongman Classic forcing him to retire from the contest. These injuries required a long period of rehabilitation, and nearly a year and a half to fully recover. At one point Girard was in a cast up to his waist. Girard's comeback took place at the 2006 Mohegan Sun Super Series event. After winning the first event, he tore his patellar tendon in the second event, the Conan's Wheel and was forced to retire from the contest. He attempted to compete in the North America's Strongest Man Competition in 2007, but withdrew due to injury. Girard was able to bounce back in 2008, winning Quebec's Strongest Man. This win qualified Girard for the 2008 Canada's Strongest Man contest. Girard was leading the contest after the first day, but suffered yet another injury on the second day of competition and tearfully announced his retirement from strongman competition.

Girard broke several records during his career, some of which are still standing today. He has held records in events such as the log press, apollon's axle press, crucifix hold, farmer's walk Atlas stones, bench press, truck pull and squat. He has also pulled an 80-ton Boeing 737 for a short distance.

Due to his strength, Girard is often compared to fellow Quebec native Louis Cyr, a dominant nineteenth-century strongman who was considered the strongest man in history at the turn of the century. Girard has trained several other strongmen in the Ottawa and Gatineau regions, including Travis Lyndon and Jessen Paulin, who has participated in the World's Strongest Man competition and succeeded Girard as Canada's Strongest Man in 2005 and 2006.

Girard is currently a member of the organization of the Gatineau Hot Air Balloon Festival that takes place every Labour Day weekend. He is also the current president of the Canadian Federation of Strength Athletes. In addition to his career as a strongman, Girard served as a police officer for 12 years.

Girard was the subject of a documentary film called "Strongman: Hugo Girard" in 2002. The film shows Girard's training for the 2002 North America's Strongest Man competition, which he eventually won. The film also features his training partners Jessen Paulin and Travis Lyndon. The film was directed by Alan Black and released by Top of the World Films.

== Personal Life ==
After bodybuilding, Girard runs a podcast called Hugo Girard Sans Limite ("Hugo Girard Without Limits"), where he interviewed some figures such as actor Sylvain Marcel and Sophie Grégoire Trudeau, the ex-wife of former Prime Minister Justin Trudeau.

== Personal records ==
- Car deadlift (side handles – from 21 inches) (for reps) – 320 kg (705 lb) x 37 reps (2004 World Muscle Power Classic) (World Record)
- Giant barbell squat (for reps) – 307 kg (677 lb) × 16 reps (raw w/ wraps) (2003 Canada's Strongest Man) (World Record)
- Viking press (for reps) – 158.5 kg (349 lb) × 21 reps (facing the pivot/ pronated grip w/resting stand) (2001 Northeast Strongman Showdown) (World Record)
- Wheelbarrow carry (no straps) – 450 kg (992 lb) for 16.10 metres (52 ft 10 in) (2004 World Muscle Power Classic) (World Record)
- Deadlift hold (with straps) – 330 kg (728 lb) for 111.06 seconds (2003 Strongman Super Series Canada Grand Prix) (World Record)
- Arm over arm car pull – 2,700 kg (5,952 lb) for 30m course in 23.03 seconds (2002 World Muscle Power Classic) (World Record)
- Arm over arm truck pull – 10,000 kg (22,046 lb) for 30m course in 55.31 seconds (2000 Canada's Strongest Man) (World Record)

== Profile ==
- Biceps: 55 cm (22 inches)
- Neck : 53 cm (21 inches)
- Calves: 55 cm (22 inches)
- Chest: 158 cm (62 inches)
- Quadriceps: 85 cm (33 inches)
- Height: 182 cm (6 feet 0 inches)
- Weight: 150 kg (330 pounds)
