= Laine Snook =

British strongman

Personal information
- Born: 1968 (age 57–58)
- Occupation: Strongman / Highland Games
- Height: 6 ft 7 in (2.01 m)
- Weight: 24 st (340 lb; 150 kg)

Sport
- Country: Great Britain

Laine Snook (born 1968) is a former strongman and professional Highland Games competitor. As an athlete he competed internationally but his career was cut short by injury. He went on to specialise in strength based sport and represented both England and Great Britain in various Highland Games and strength athletic events. He also became the world benchpress champion. Snook gained international fame as one of the world's foremost exponents of grip strength.

Competition record

Highland Games

Representing England

World Highland Games Caber-tossing champion
Champion	2001

Strongman

Representing United Kingdom

Rolling Thunder World Record
Champion	1 August 2006

Powerlifting

World Benchpressing championships World Drug Free Powerlifting Federation (WDFPF)
Champion	1997
Champion	1999

== Early life ==
Snook's father ran a large transport company, something which he would go on to emulate in running Devon Fleet's Hereford Branch. By the age of 12 Snook was already 6'2'' and 210 lb (95 kg). He became a shot putter under the mentorship of Geoff Capes.

== Sporting career ==
=== Athletics ===
Winning events such as the AAA Midland Counties championship in 1994, (following in the footsteps of athletes such as Bill Tancred and Andy Drzewiecki) Snook got invited at platforms to perform at international level. However, an operation on his spine forced him to abandon a career as a track and field athlete. He therefore began concentrating on other strength sports.

=== Bench press ===
Snook won the British and European bench pressing championships super-heavyweight division on numerous occasions. In 1997 and 1999, he won the World Drug-Free Bench Press Championship. He is also noted for having broken a number of records in bench pressing and in 1999 became Guinness world record holder for the most bench presses of a person in one minute, lifting Ian Wright and the bench he was lying on, amounting to 242 lb (110 kg) for 56 repetitions. Snook traveled the world defending this record, ultimately reaching 92 repetitions in one minute in 2006 on a Guinness world record exhibition in Spain.

=== Strongman ===
As a strongman, Snook competed at national level and was a finalist in both 2000 and 2001 Britain's Strongest Man.

=== Highland games ===
Snook is also a successful Highland games competitor and in 2001 became the world caber-tossing champion.

=== Grip strength ===
Snook came into the radar of Randall J. Strossen in 2000, when he got certified on the Captains of Crush – No.3 gripper (which requires 127 kg (280 lb)/ RGC 149 of pressure to close) officiated by Jamie Reeves. He is also the 6th non-American to do it.

In August 2006, Snook broke Andrus Murumets' highly acclaimed Rolling Thunder world record with a lift of 274.2 lb (124.4 kg) with the IronMind Rolling Thunder V1. This was performed at Pullum Sports, Luton. However, Snook couldn't attend the 2008 World Championships due to an injury, which was eventually won by Mark Felix with a new world record.

In March 2008, at the Oscar Heidenstam Foundation dinner event, Snook cleaned the 172 lb (78 kg) Thomas Inch dumbbell, becoming the second man in history after Mark Henry to achieve this feat. Later that same evening, he succeeded in lifting the 231 lb (105 kg) Millennium dumbbell and the Thomas Inch dumbbell simultaneously. Snook also became the second man in history after Odd Haugen to lift the Millennium dumbbell.

In August 2008, Snook cleaned the 185 lb (84 kg) 'Supernova' kettlebell to the shoulder becoming the first man in history to perform this feat. In December 2008, at the Whey Power Challenge Snook became the first man in history to lift two Millennium dumbbells each weighing 230 lb (104 kg) simultaneously.

In March 2012, Snook unofficially lifted 332.0 lb (150.6 kg) with Rolling Thunder V2 during training at his home gym which to-date remains the heaviest weight ever lifted for the implement irrespective of the versions. However it was observed that at that weight, the rotating nature of the handle was not happening anymore, hence V3 was introduced and all the previous records including Alexey Tyukalov's official 331.8 lb (150.5 kg) were nullified.

In April 2015, Snook broke the world record for IronMind's 'Little Big Horn' (anvil lift) with a lift of 236.5 lb (107.3 kg). and in October 2019, at King Kong grip challenge in Dubai, broke his own world record for the Millennium dumbbell lift for reps, with 8 repetitions.
