= Alexey Tyukalov =

Russian strongman

- Born: November 9, 1978 (age 47)
- Occupation: Grip strength specialist
- Height: 1.82 m (5 ft 11 1/2 in)

Alexey 'Tank' Tyukalov (born 9 November 1978) is a Russian strongman and grip strength specialist.

During his childhood Tyukalov excelled in Boxing but gradually moved to grip strength training after realizing his prodigious hand strength. In 1998, he moved to Finland to study Economics, however pursued grip training during his leisure time.

In 2012, he officially closed the IronMind Captains of Crush No.3 gripper (127 kg (280 lb)/ RGC 149 of pressure) which is recognized as the gold standard in world class crush grip, and in the same year, broke Juha Harju's world record in the 'Captains of Crush - Silver Bullet Hold' with the No.3 gripper with a time of 52.49 seconds.

In his first Armlifting competition '2013 Visegrip Viking', following a fierce battle against Mike Burke, he managed to establish the all time world record in the IronMind Rolling Thunder with the new and improved, version 3 and placed overall second behind Burke in the full competition. Ensuing years, Tyukalov won the Visegrip Viking 3 consecutive times in 2015, 2016 and 2017.

In 2018, Tyukalov broke the IronMind Rolling Thunder Pull-up world record with a bodyweight plus attached weight of 155.5 kg (343 lb) and continued to break the world record another four more times by 2020. In 2023, Tyukalov became the first man to get certified on the IronMind Crushed-to-Dust 'Plus' challenge.

In 2025, Tyukalov broke the IronMind Little Big Horn (blacksmith's anvil lift) world record with a lift of 110 kg (243 lb), surpassing Dmytro Potapenko's 108 kg (238 lb) from 2018.

== Personal records ==
- IronMind Rolling Thunder (V3) – 130.5 kg (287.7 lb) (2013 Visegrip Viking) (World Record)

→ By 2012, Mark Felix held the Rolling Thunder world record with V2 at 146.7 kg (323 lb), and Tyukalov broke it with 150.5 kg (332 lb) during 2013 A1 Grand Prix held in Moscow, by becoming the first man to officially break the 150k barrier. However, V2 was discontinued from this point onwards because it was observed that just like with V1, the expected rotation of the handle was not happening anymore at these weights. All V1 and V2 records were nullified and V3 was introduced.
Please see: Progression of the Rolling Thunder world record.

- IronMind Rolling Thunder Pull-up – 165 kg (364 lb) (2020) (former world record)
- IronMind Little Big Horn – 110.1 kg (242.7 lb) (2025) (World Record)
- IronMind Apollon's Axle double overhand deadlift – 227.5 kg (502 lb) (2024 Arnold Classic Armlifting Championships)

→ the thickness of this Axle is 2" (50.8mm)

- Sorinex Saxon bar (3x4" rectangular bar) deadlift – 127.5 kg (281 lb) (2025 Arnold Classic Armlifting Championships)
- IronMind Captains of Crush Silver Bullet Hold (with No.4 gripper) – 17.8 seconds (2017) (former world record)
- IronMind Captains of Crush Silver Bullet Hold (with No.3 gripper) – 52.49 seconds (2012) (former world record)
- IronMind Crushed-to-Dust 'Plus' – Captains of Crush No.3 gripper, 35 kg (77 lb) on Hub lift and 115 kg (254 lb) on Rolling Thunder (2023)

→ first man to achieve this feat, and to-date, one of only two men to achieve it alongwith Nikita Yurkovets (2024)

== World championships ==
- 1 x Rolling Thunder World Championships Champion
- 2 x Arnold Armlifting Championships Men U125/125+ Champion
- 2 x Armlifting World Championships Champion
- 1 x World's Strongest Grip Champion
- 1 x Armlifting USA Men Open (+125 kg) Event Champion
- 3 x Visegrip Viking Champion
