= Andrus Murumets =

Estonian strongman (born 1978)

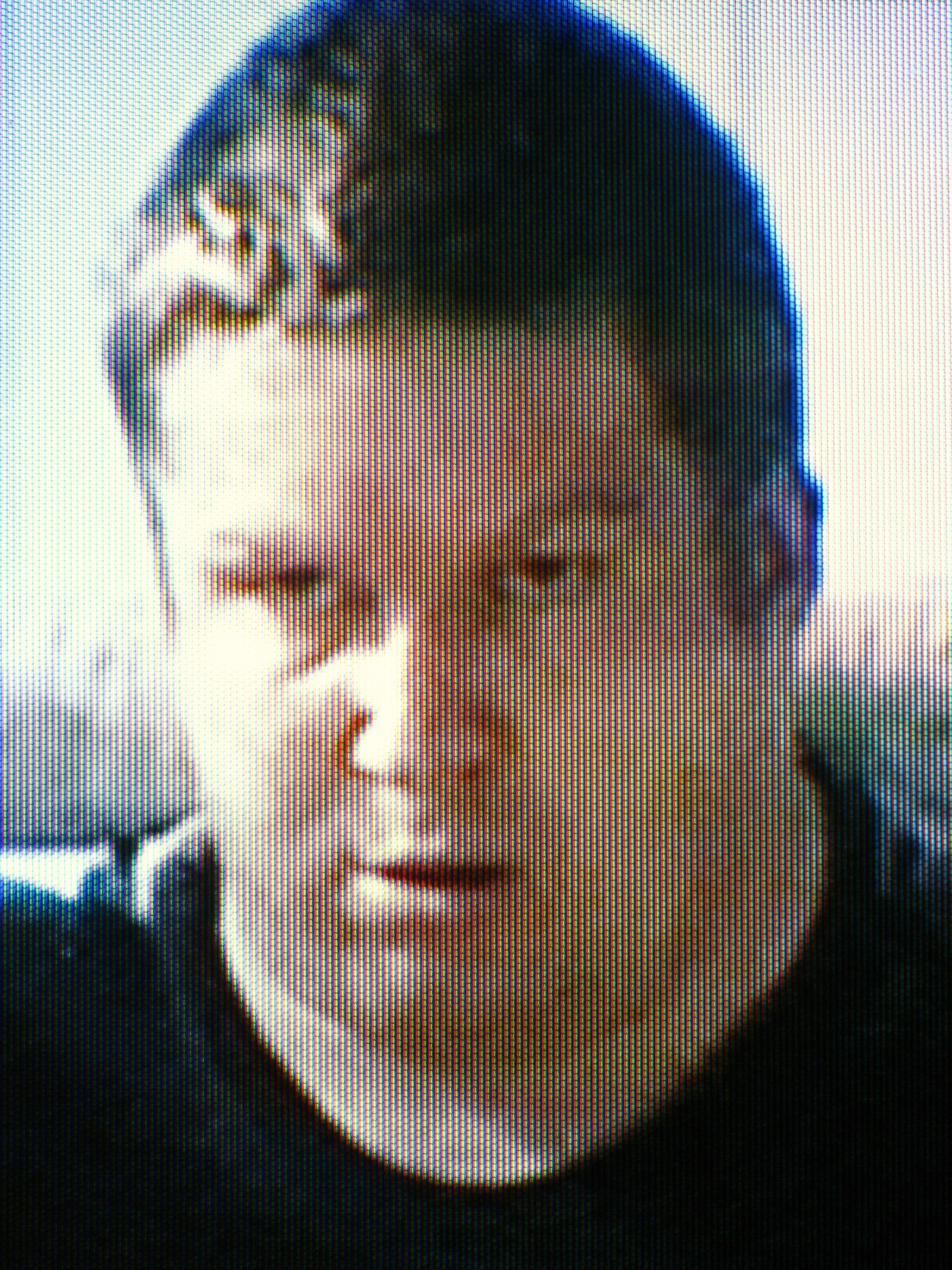

Personal information
- Born: 20 July 1978 (age 48) Ahja, Estonia
- Occupations: Strongman, police officer
- Employers: Estonian Police and Border Guard Board
- Height: 6 ft 2 in (1.88 m)
- Spouse: Merilyn
- Children: Martin, Emma
Medal record
Strongman
Representing Estonia
Arnold Strongman Classic
3rd	2007
4th	2008
7th	2009
IFSA World Championships
4th	2005
5th	2006
5th	2007
Strongman Champions League
3rd	2008 Serbia
2nd	2008 Netherlands
1st	2008 Bulgaria
1st	2009 Overall
2nd	2009 Serbia
1st	2009 Finland
1st	2009 Slovakia
Fortissimus
9th	2008
7th	2009
Europe's Strongest Man (IFSA)
3rd	2005
2nd	2007
Estonia's Strongest Man
1st	2002
2nd	2003
2nd	2004
1st	2005
1st	2006
1st	2007
1st	2009

Andrus Murumets (born 20 July 1978) is an Estonian strongman and entrant to the World's Strongest Man contest. He reached 5th in the World Rankings according to the IFSA rankings in 2008.

Andrus competed in the IFSA World Championships in 2005 finishing 4th, 5th in 2006 and 5th in 2007. Andrus has competed in the Arnold Strongman Classic 3 times, his best finish was 3rd in 2007. In 2009 he became the overall champion of the Strongman Champions League.

He has been described by Svend Karlsen as having the strongest grip in the world. Having competed in 40 International strongman competitions and winning 6 of them, Andrus is among the 50 most decorated strongmen of all time.

Murumets lives near Tallinn in Üksnurme, Saku Parish. Since May 2011 Murumets is working as a police officer.

== Personal records ==
- IronMind Rolling Thunder (V1) – 121.1 kg (267 lb) (former world record)

→ Broke Magnus Samuelsson's record and was later surpassed by Laine Snook.

- Captains of Crush – No.3 gripper (127 kg (280 lb)/ RGC 149 of pressure))
- Apollon's Wheels – 166 kg (366 lb) x 5 power cleans and reps (2007 Arnold Strongman Classic) (former joint-world record)
- Log press – 185 kg (408 lb) (2008 SCL Holland)
- Axle press – 190 kg (419 lb) (2007 IFSA Strongman World Championships)
- IFSA shield carry – 183.5 kg (405 lb) for 94.20 metres (309 ft 1 in) (2005 IFSA European Championships) (former world record)
- Timber carry – 392 kg (864 lb) (40-foot inclined ramp) in 6.87 seconds (raw grip) (2007 Arnold Strongman Classic) (World Record)
- Farmer's walk (no straps) – 160 kg (353 lb) per each hand for 50m course in 43.60 seconds (former world record)
- Farmer's walk (no straps) – 145 kg (320 lb) per each hand for 30m course in 11.76 seconds (2007 IFSA Lithuania Grand Prix) (World Record)
- Atlas Stone – 220 kg (485 lb) over 4 ft bar (2007 Arnold Strongman Classic)
- Natural stone lift to platform – 5 Rocks ranging from 102–192 kg (225–423 lb) in 28.86 seconds (2006 IFSA Russia Grand Prix) (World Record)
- Arm over arm car pull – 5,500 kg (12,125 lb) for 15m course in 24.55 seconds (2008 SCL Serbia) (World Record)
