= Rolling Thunder (exercise) =

Grip training exercise and equipment

Rolling Thunder is a one-hand deadlift first developed in 1993 by IronMind Enterprises, Inc. It primarily tests grip strength via a rotating, thick handle of 2 3/8" (6.03 cm) in diameter and 7 1/2" (19.05 cm) in length (rotating portion is 6" (15.24 cm)) attached to a weight loadable Olympic loading pin via a carabiner. The thickness of the handle is derived from the Thomas Inch dumbbell.

Throughout the years, it became an internationally recognized method to measure 'support grip' which is one of the three facets of hand strength along-with crush grip and pinch grip.

== Versions ==
The first version (V1), had a black coloured handle and was used from 1993 to 2008. However, as the records with this handle kept on increasing during the 2000s, it was observed that the handle drop test (which was used to verify the rotating nature of the handle) didn't work anymore. Despite rotating without added weight or upto moderate amounts of weight, it would not rotate at the verge of the world record weights at the time. To mitigate this, Randall J. Strossen developed the second version (V2) which featured a dark blue coloured handle. It was better than its predecessor however, uniformity of the device was not even. When some of the devices rotated well, some exhibited the same issue V1 had which was not rotating at world record weights in 2012/13. Further developments were made and the third version (V3) was introduced with a dark blue handle which featured distinctive closed end caps contrary to the hollow cylinder of V1 and V2.

== World record ==
- 287.7 pounds (130.5 kg) (with the V3) by Alexey Tyukalov (Russia) (2013 Visegrip Viking)

→ Regarded as the current all-time world record since previous records with V1 and V2 were affiliated with flaws in the units.

=== Progression of the world record ===
Holder	Weight	Event name and Location	Date
(Czech Republic) Jan Bártl	265.4 pounds (120.4 kg)	2000 Beauty & the Beast challenge (Note: Considered a Rolling Thunder World Championship.); Honolulu, Hawaii, USA	1 May 2000
(Rule change: Previously, they allowed a competitor to use a thumbless (false) grip. Because it was later felt that this was not in the spirit of the lift, since it allowed strong-wristed competitors to remove the grip element of the event by cocking their wrists, thumbless grips are now no longer allowed.)
(Czech Republic) Jan Bártl	258.5 pounds (117.3 kg)	2001 Beauty & the Beast challenge Honolulu, Hawaii, USA	31 May 2001
(Sweden) Magnus Samuelsson	262.0 pounds (118.8 kg)	2003 IFSA/GNC Pro Strongman Challenge; Las Vegas, Nevada, USA	3 Jun 2003
(Estonia) Andrus Murumets	267.0 pounds (121.1 kg)	2003 IFSA All Strength Challenge; Winnipeg, Manitoba, Canada	16 Jun 2003
(United Kingdom) Laine Snook	274.2 pounds (124.4 kg)	2006 Pullum Sports Exhibition Luton, United Kingdom	1 Aug 2006
(United Kingdom) Mark Felix	301.0 pounds (136.5 kg)	2008 Mohegan Sun Grand Prix; Uncasville, Connecticut, USA	18 Jan 2008
(Version change: By now, the rotating nature of the handle was not happening anymore hence V2 was introduced. All records above, were with V1).
(United Kingdom) Mark Felix	323.5 pounds (146.7 kg) (Note: The lift was displayed 332.2 pounds (150.7 kg) during the event, but it was later revealed that the actual weight was 323.5 pounds (146.7 kg) and it was a computational error on the scoresheet.)	2012 Bodypower Expo Birmingham, United Kingdom	22 May 2012
(Russia) Alexey Tyukalov	331.8 pounds (150.5 kg)	2013 A1 Grand Prix Moscow, Russia	30 Jul 2013
(Version change: It was noticed that both above performances including Snook's unofficial record (Note: On 8 Mar 2012 Laine Snook lifted an unofficial 332.0 pounds (150.6 kg) during training at his home gym.) were done with official but flawed V2 handles which resembled the same error V1 had, hence V3 was introduced and all the previous records were nullified).
(United States) Mike Burke	282.2 pounds (128.0 kg)	2013 Visegrip Viking San Jose, California, USA	10 Oct 2013
(Russia) Alexey Tyukalov	287.7 pounds (130.5 kg)	2013 Visegrip Viking San Jose, California, USA	10 Oct 2013

==== Women's world record progression ====
Holder	Weight	Event name	Date
(United States) Becca Swanson	135.0 pounds (61.2 kg)	St. Louis Steel Fingers Challenge	01 Jul 2002
(United Kingdom) Elizabeth Horne	144.4 pounds (65.5 kg)	British Rolling Thunder Champs	07 Apr 2007
(Finland) Jaana Tanner	147.2 pounds (66.8 kg)	IronMind Grip Classic Volume II	28 Jan 2012
(Finland) Jaana Tanner	152.7 pounds (69.3 kg)	IronMind Grip Classic Record Breakers	26 May 2012
(Ukraine) Irina Postnikova	159.2 pounds (72.2 kg)	Armlifting World Championships	22 Sep 2012
(Ukraine) Ludmilla Gaiduchenko	170.2 pounds (77.2 kg)	Armlifting World Championships	22 Sep 2012
(United States) Hafsa Mason	176.3 pounds (80.0 kg)	West Coast Arm Sports Hands of Doom II	21 Aug 2024

== Similar equipment ==
Since IronMind, numerous other competitors have produced similar products specially following its flawed design with V1 and V2.

'Grip Genie RGT' is known for being more difficult than IronMind V3 because it rotates more freely and rapidly due to less friction. The world record with this is held by Carl Myerscough (United Kingdom) at 226.0 pounds (102.5 kg).

'Gods of grip' Godlike rolling handle and 'Titan' rotating deadlift handle offer three handle diameter options at 2", 2.5" and 3".
