= Beauty and the Beast (strongman competition) =

- The official logo of Beauty and the Beast 2001

Tournament information
- Location: Hawaii
- Established: 1998
- Final year: 2003
- Format: Multi-event competition

Final champion
- (Poland) Mariusz Pudzianowski

The Beauty and The Beast Strongman Challenge, also known as the Beauty and The Beast World Strongman Challenge, was a short-lived annual strongman competition that was notable for the calibre of the entrants it attracted, as well as for the reputation it attained in a short amount of time.

== History ==
The Beauty and The Beast Strongman Challenge was organised and promoted by strongman competitor Odd Haugen from 1998. It was initially promoted on the IFSA circuit as the North American open championship and from its inception took place in Honolulu, Hawaii. In its first year it was dominated by the USA, with the winner being Mark Philippi, a successful athlete in other major tournaments such as World Muscle Power Classic.

By 1999 the promoter and competitor, Odd Haugen had enticed many more international competitors including 1998 World's Strongest Man winner Magnus Samuelsson and 1997 World's Strongest Man winner Jouko Ahola. The previous year had been the final year of the original format World Strongman Challenge, and so Haugen appended this prestigious events title to the end of Beauty and The Beast, thus continuing the tradition of one of strength athletics more enduring brands. Ahola tested some of the events for Haugen and gave his approval by stating "This is like a Finnish competition, heavy. I like that." With such pedigree the competition did draw on June 5 and 6, the top American competitors, as well as some of the biggest names on the international strongman circuit. It was called the "24 Hour Fitness" "Beauty & the Beast" strongman competition and featured on ESPN's "American Muscle Magazine". The IFSA combined an IFSA Grand Prix and the IFSA American Championships into this event. The promoter, Odd Haugen, placed third in the IFSA American Championships section of the competition, although no USA athlete made the Grand Prix podium.

2000 again attracted international strongmen who again dominated the standings, with Janne Virtanen winning the event. These championships were also notable for introducing the Rolling Thunder World Championships, seen as the event that determines the athlete with the greatest grip strength on the planet. In 2000 this was a kickoff event in a Honolulu sports bar the night before the strongman competition began. Those that entered included the four-time World's Strongest Man winner Magnus Ver Magnusson.

The 2001 edition of Beauty and the Beast was held on June 2 and was a one-day, eight-event contest. The podium saw three winners of the World's Strongest Man title with Magnus Samuelsson, Phil Pfister and Svend Karlsen finishing first, second and third respectively.

The 2002 edition of the Beauty and Beast was scheduled for June 8, featuring defending World's Strongest Man winner Svend Karlsen, along with other top competitors including Janne Virtanen, Hugo Girard, Martin Muhr, Wout Zijlstra, Phil Pfister, Karl Gillingham, Brian Schoonveld, Jesse Marunde, and Grant Higa. The IFSA World Strongman Super Series was being heavily promoted in 2002 and Beauty and the Beast formed part of that. In the end, it became the Grand Prix Final held on January 17, 2003, finishing off the 2002 season. The very next day, a second Hawaii Grand Prix, again deemed Beauty and the Beast, was held as the opener for the 2003 IFSA World Strongman Super Series. Some deemed this a little farcical. This turned out to be the last holding of the event. Like the World Muscle Power Classic, once the Beauty and the Beast became entangled with the Super Series, it lost its stand alone gravitas and quickly fell from favour. In the tentative schedule for the 2004/05 Super Series there was to have been a November Hawaii Grand Prix, but that season was foreshortened and this did not take place.

== The Beauty ==
The Beauty and the Beast was so-called because there were in fact two events running. The strongman equated to the Beast. The beauty was initially a bikini fitness challenge. In 2001 this was replaced by the first ever Women's Strength & Fitness Challenge.

== Results ==
Year	Champion	Runner-up	3rd place	Location
2003; Hawaii Grand Prix 2003 (held Jan 18 2003) of 2003 Strongman Super Series	(Poland) Mariusz Pudzianowski	(Latvia) Raimonds Bergmanis	(Lithuania) Zydrunas Savickas	(United States) Hawaiian Waters Adventure Park, Honolulu, Hawaii
2002; Hawaii Grand Prix Final (held Jan 17 2003) of 2002 Strongman Super Series (24-Hour Fitness Grand Prix Final)	(Canada) Hugo Girard	(Lithuania) Zydrunas Savickas	(Poland) Mariusz Pudzianowski	(United States) Hawaiian Waters Adventure Park, Honolulu, Hawaii
2001	(Sweden) Magnus Samuelsson	(United States) Phil Pfister	(Norway) Svend Karlsen	(United States) Honolulu, Hawaii
2000	(Finland) Janne Virtanen	(Germany) Heinz Ollesch	(Norway) Svend Karlsen	(United States) Honolulu, Hawaii
1999	(Finland) Jouko Ahola	(Sweden) Magnus Samuelsson	(Samoa) Joe Onosai	(United States) Sea Life Park, Honolulu, Hawaii
1998	(United States) Mark Philippi	(Samoa) Joe Onosai	(United States) Curtis Leffler	(United States) Honolulu, Hawaii

== Rolling Thunder ==
The association between Strongman contests and the Rolling Thunder grip contests, as seen at Mohegan Sun Grand Prix events and Fortissimus began with Odd Haugen's Beauty and the Beast contests. The 2000 Rolling Thunder World Championships was a kickoff event in a Honolulu sports bar the night before the strongman competition began. On May 31, 2001 the second annual IronMind Rolling Thunder World Championships were held in conjunction with the Beauty & the Beast strongman competition. Both 2000 and 2001 were won by Jan Bártl. No such championship was held in 2002, with the IFSA shifting the June 2002 date for the contest to January 2003. The world championships were not to be reintroduced until 2008.

=== Men's Rolling Thunder World Championships at Beauty and the Beast ===
Date	Champion	Weight	Location
2001 (May 31)	(Czech Republic) Jan Bártl	258.5 pounds (117.3 kg)	(United States) 2001 Beauty and the Beast Strongman Contest Honolulu, Hawaii
2000 (May)	(Czech Republic) Jan Bártl	265.4 pounds (120.4 kg)	(United States) 2000 Beauty and the Beast Strongman Contest Honolulu, Hawaii

== See also ==
- List of strongman competitions
