= Carl Myerscough =

British shot putter and discus thrower

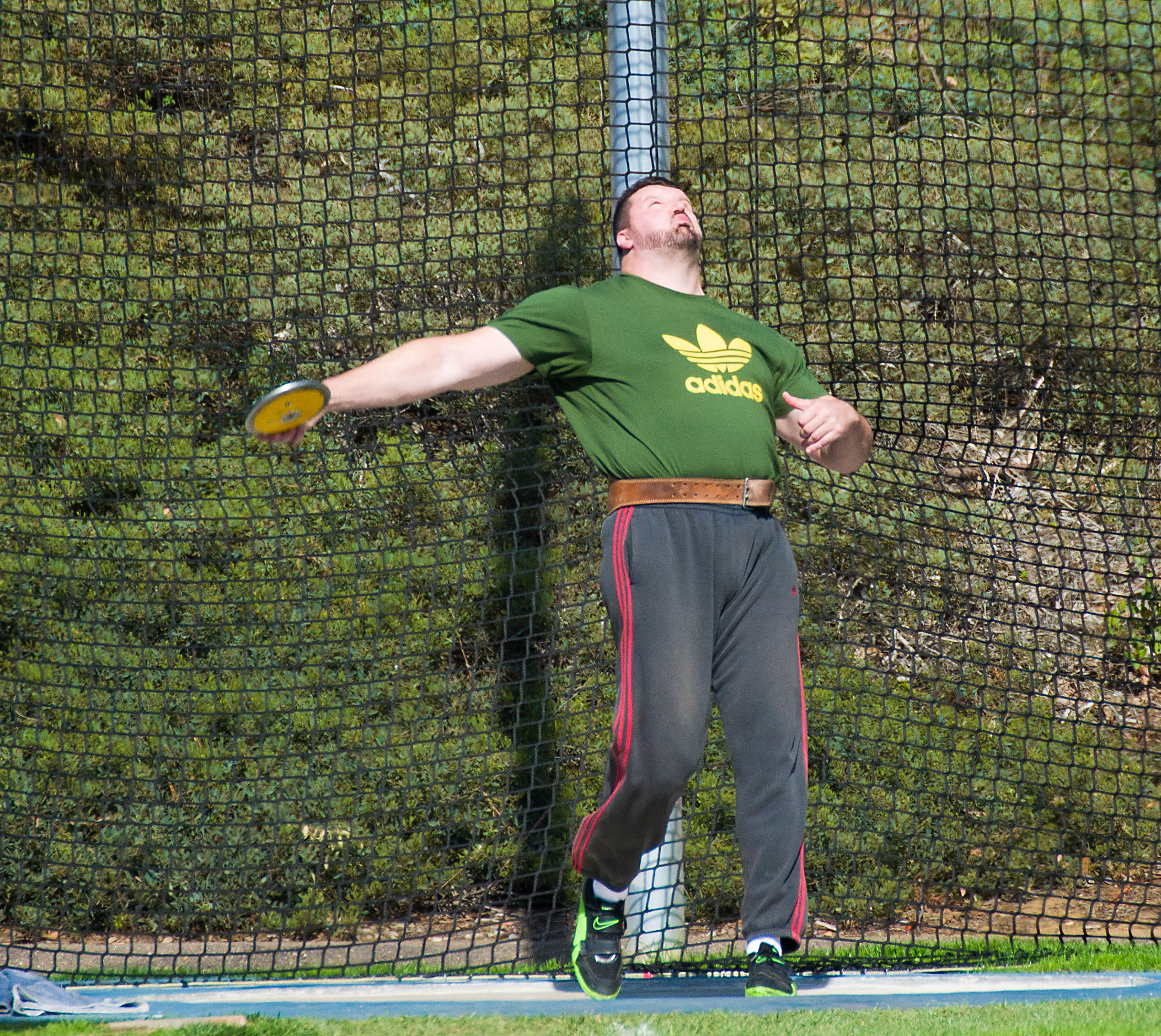
- Myerscough in 2012

Personal information
- Nickname: The Blackpool Tower
- Nationality: British (English)
- Born: 21 October 1979 (age 47) Hambleton, Lancashire
- Height: 2.08 m (6 ft 10 in)
- Weight: 160 kg (25 st 3 lb; 353 lb)
- Spouse: Melissa Price

Sport
- Sport: Athletics
- Events: Shot put and Discus throw
- University team: University of Nebraska–Lincoln
- Club: Blackpool Wyre and Fylde AC
- Retired: 2016
Medal record
Commonwealth Games
Bronze medal – third place	2002 Manchester	Shot put
Bronze medal – third place	2010 Delhi	Discus

Carl Andrew Myerscough (born 21 October 1979) is an English former track and field athlete specialised in shot put and discus throw and a world record holder grip strength specialist. His height of 208 cm (6 ft 10 in) earned him the nickname 'The Blackpool Tower'.

== Biography ==
=== Track and field ===
While competing for the University of Nebraska–Lincoln Carl gained two indoor (2002–03) and two outdoor (2003–04) NCAA Division 1 championships. He graduated from the University of Nebraska–Lincoln in 2004, with a degree in Fine Art and was British champion in the shot put ten times consecutively from 2003 to 2012. He also competed in four IAFF World Championships.

In 2002 Commonwealth Games in Manchester, Carl won bronze in the Shot put. In 2003, he exceeded the British record with a best of 21.92m set in winning the NCAA championships in Sacramento, California, although the performance was not ratified by UK Athletics. In 2004, he won the European Cup in Bydgoszcz, Poland with a throw of 20.85m. In 2010 Commonwealth Games in Delhi Carl won bronze in the discus throw.

Myerscough was a ten-times British shot put champion after winning the British AAA Championships title from 2003 to 2006 and the British Athletics Championships title from 2007 to 2012. Additionally, Myerscough was the British discus throw champion in 2005 and 2006.

During Carl's early career, he failed a drug test which resulted in a ban from competing for two years. The ban was subsequently overturned by the Court of Arbitration for Sport and in 2012, Carl became an Olympian by taking part in the 2012 Summer Olympics in London.

=== Grip strength ===
Carl was introduced to Captains of Crush (CoC) grippers when he was a student at the University of Nebraska–Lincoln, and he managed to close the No. 2.5 gripper the first time he attempted it. After retiring from track and field in 2016, Carl dedicated four months into grip training and in 2017 got himself certified on the No. 3 gripper. He continued to progress and in 2018, got certified on the No. 3.5 gripper. In August 2023, he became the sixth person ever to get certified on the No. 4 gripper, and the only person to do it after the introduction of its credit card rule.

In September 2023, Carl made history again by certifying on the GHP (Note: Abbreviations: CoC - Captains of Crush, brand of hand grippers by IronMind. GHP - Gillingham High Performance, brand of hand grippers. RGC - Redneck Gripper Calibration, a rating system that measures the poundage required to close the gripper at the end of the handle with a 1-inch strap.) Level 10 gripper. He is the first and only person in history to accomplish this feat of crush grip strength, and it remains the strongest gripper ever closed by a human. For reference, the CoC No. 4 gripper he closed was rated at 215 lb RGC (by Cannon Powerworks), which means the GHP 10 he closed is nearly 20% more difficult than his CoC No.4 close (Note: "When we built the Level 10, I never really thought anyone would close it. It's so far past the level of strength of a CoC 4 or the GHP 9 that it's really hard to believe anyone's hand would be strong enough to handle the pressure".: Wade Gillingham, founder of Gillingham High Performance (GHP) grippers.) while the narrower GHP block (38mm) vs. the IronMind credit card (54mm) improves the starting leverage.

Carl is also a 3-time Arnold Classic Armlifting Champion, and one among handful of people who have lifted the Millennium Dumbbell. He has broken more than 20 grip-related world records and is known for his exceptional grip strength with his achievements ranging from launching a 'York Legacy Blob' which weighs 3 times as heavy as a standard Olympic shot

== Feats of grip strength ==
- GHP Level 10 gripper – 193 kg (425 lb)/ RGC 256 lb x 1 rep (38mm block) (World Record) (Only man to close it / strongest gripper ever closed)
  - GHP Level 9 gripper – 170 kg (375 lb)/ RGC 210 lb x 1 rep (54mm credit card), 8 speed reps (both are World Records)
- Ironmind CoC No. 4 gripper – 165.5 kg (365 lb)/ RGC 215 lb x 1 rep (54mm credit card) (World Record)
  (Only man to close it under the credit card rule / sixth man to close it overall / first man to close it in 19 years after Magnus Samuelsson), both left and right hand simultaneous close, Joe Kinney style close (all are World Records)
  - IronMind CoC No. 3.5 gripper – 146 kg (322 lb)/ RGC 175 of pressure x 9 reps (54mm credit card), 18 speed reps, Joe Kinney style close and hold (10 seconds), both left and right hand simultaneous close (all are World Records)
- Double overhand Apollon's Axle deadlift – 237.5 kg (524 lb) (Former World Record) (the thickness of this Axle is 2" (50.8mm))
- Double overhand Rogue Axle deadlift – 248 kg (547 lb) (Joint-World Record) (the thickness of this Axle is 1 11/12" (49.3mm))
  - Double overhand barbell deadlift with Fat grips pro (blue - 2.25" outer diameter) – 208 kg (459 lb) (World Record)
  - Double overhand extra thick Axle deadlift (2.5" outer diameter) – 206.5 kg (455 lb) (World Record) (the thickness of this Axle is 2 1/2" (63.0mm))
  - Double overhand Rogue Axle deadlift hold – 227.3 kg (501 lb) for 8 seconds
  - Double overhand snatch grip Rogue Axle deadlift – 200 kg (441 lb)
  - Apollon's Axle overhead strict press – 172.8 kg (381 lb) (Max), 143 kg (315 lb) x 8 reps
  - Apollon's Axle arms stretched front hold – 52 kg (115 lb) for 6 seconds
- Sorinex Saxon bar (3x4" rectangular bar) deadlift – 142.5 kg (314 lb) (World Record)
  (Carl also held the former world record 4 times with 136.5 kg (301 lb), 132.5 kg (292 lb), 130 kg (287 lb) and 127.5 kg (281 lb))
  - Sorinex Saxon bar deadlift (for reps) – 125 kg (276 lb) x 3 reps, 111 kg (245 lb) x 10 reps
  - Sorinex Saxon bar snatch grip deadlift – 121.5 kg (268 lb)
  - Sorinex Saxon bar one arm deadlift – 68 kg (150 lb)
  - Sorinex Saxon bar curls – 90.8 kg (200 lb) (Max), 61 kg (134 lb) x 9 reps
  - Sorinex Saxon bar clean and overhead press – 100 kg (220 lb)
  - Sorinex Saxon bar one arm snatch – 41.5 kg (91 lb) (World Record)
- Millennium Dumbbell 104.5 kg (230 lb) – one hand lift and hold (9 seconds) (World Record), pick up and walk (9 ft) (World Record)
- Inch Dumbbell 78 kg (172 lb) – one hand clean to the shoulder, one hand high snatch, & cheat curls x 3 reps per hand
- One arm barbell deadlift with Fat grips extreme (orange - 2.75" outer diameter) – 90.8 kg (200 lb)
  - One arm barbell deadlift with Fat grips pro (blue - 2.25" outer diameter) – 104.5 kg (230 lb)
  - One arm Rogue Axle deadlift – 122.5 kg (270 lb)
- Suitcase grip double sides deadlift (both hands) with Apollon's Axle on the right and Rogue Axle on the left – 120 kg (265 lb) per hand
  - Suitcase grip one side one arm deadlift with Fat grips pro (blue - 2.25" outer diameter) – 112.75 kg (249 lb)
  - Straddle lift (in-between legs one arm deadlift with Fat grips pro (blue - 2.25" outer diameter) – 110 kg (243 lb), with Fat grips one (black - 1.75" outer diameter) – 136 kg (300 lb)
- IronMind Rolling Thunder – 117.5 kg (259 lb)
  - Grip Genie RGT (Rolling Grip Thing) – 102.5 kg (226 lb) (World Record)
- Non-revolving Dumbbell one arm deadlift with Fat grips pro (blue - 2.25" outer diameter) – 122.55 kg (270 lb)
- Monster-Crush (3" rotating double handle) – 165.7 kg (365 lb) (World Record)
- Country-Crush (2" rotating double handle) – 220 kg (485 lb) (World Record)
- Raptor (3" rotating single handle) – 83 kg (183 lb) (World Record)
- Raptor (2" rotating single handle) – 122 kg (269 lb) (World Record)
- Raptor (1.75" rotating single handle) – 127.5 kg (281 lb) (World Record)
- Crusher (2.25" rotating single handle) – 120.1 kg (265 lb) (World Record)
- Crusher (2" rotating single handle) – 136.4 kg (301 lb) (World Record)
- Trilobite by Barrel Strength (3" rotating handle) – 84 kg (185 lb)
- Vingot two hand pinch lift by Arm Assassin – 129.2 kg (285 lb) (World Record)
  (Carl also held the previous world record with 125.4 kg (276 lb) and also holds the one arm world record with 60.5 kg (133 lb)
- 2 Hand Flask pinch lift – 128 kg (282 lb) (World Record)
- IronMind Hub – 43 kg (95 lb)
- Plate curls – 25 kg (55 lb) x 1 rep per hand, 20 kg (44 lb) x 5 reps per hand
- Double Plate curls – two 25 kg (55 lb) bumper plates with both hands x 1 rep, two 20 kg (44 lb) bumper plates with both hands x 5 reps
- Barbell Reverse curl – 90.8 kg (200 lb) x 1 rep
- Plate side laterals – 25 kg (55 lb) x 2 reps, 20 kg (44 lb) x 5 reps

== Personal life ==
Carl is married to the American athlete Melissa Price. They have two daughters: Mia and Grace.

== See also ==
- https://www.instagram.com/carl.myerscough/ – Instagram account
- List of doping cases in athletics
