= Joe Kinney (strongman) =

American strongman

- Occupation: Grip strength specialist
- Known for: Being the first man to officially close IronMind Captains of Crush No. 4 gripper
- Height: 1.78 m (5 ft 10 in)

Joe Kinney is an American strongman, grip strength specialist and crush grip innovator from Bean Station, Tennessee.

In 1998, he became the first man to officially close the IronMind Captains of Crush No.4 gripper (165.5 kg (365 lb)/ RGC 213 of pressure) which is recognized as the pinnacle feat in world class crush grip. Despite five other men (Nathan Holle, David Morton, Tommy Heslep, Magnus Samuelsson and Carl Myerscough) have managed getting certified on this gripper since then, Kinney did it in a slow and steady paced manner that has never been replicated.

In 1999, he became the first man to close the IronMind Captains of Crush No.3 gripper (127 kg (280 lb)/ RGC 149 of pressure) using only two fingers.

Some of Kinney's crush grip innovations include performing extra heavy negatives (severe negatives) and wrist rolling, and training with the long handled Monster gripper, floor-model gripper and 'Secret Weapon' grip machine. He also advocated on heavy high rep squatting as a building block for hand and grip strength.

Along with Randall J. Strossen and Nathan Holle, Kinney co-authored Captains of Crush Grippers: What they are and how to close them.
