= Strossen =

Strossen is a surname. Notable people with the surname include:

- Nadine Strossen (born 1950), American civil liberties activist
- Randall J. Strossen, American author
