= Jan Bártl =

Czech strongman

Personal information
- Nationality: Czech Republic
- Born: 23 March 1967 (age 59)
- Occupation(s): Strongman, track and field
- Height: 6 ft 5 in (1.96 m)
- Weight: 145 kg (320 lb)
Medal record
Strongman
Representing Czech Republic
IFSA Grand Prix
5th	1999 IFSA Czech Grand Prix
1st	2000 IFSA Czech Grand Prix
Strongman Super Series
7th	2001 Czech Grand Prix
7th	2001 Sweden Grand Prix
Beauty and the Beast
9th	2000 Beauty and the Beast

Jan Bártl (born 23 March 1967) is a Czech former track and field athlete specialised in shot put and discus throw and a strongman from Prague.

== Career ==
Bártl started his athletic career as a track and field athlete. In 1996 he registered a personal best shot put of 18.81 metres (61 ft 9 in) and in 1998 a personal best discus throw of 54.58 metres (179 ft 1 in).

Bártl started his strongman career in 1999 IFSA Czech Grand Prix with a fifth place finish and was quickly noted for his grip strength. During 2000 Beauty and the Beast competition, he performed 120.4 kg (265.4 lb) on the Rolling Thunder with a thumbless grip for a new world record. However, upon banning the thumbless grip by IronMind Enterprises, Bártl initiated a new revised world record during 2001 Rolling Thunder World Championship with 117.3 kg (258.6 lb) which remained unbeaten since 2003 by Magnus Samuelsson.

Bártl's strength career highlight came in 2000 IFSA Czech Grand Prix where he beat Svend Karlsen, Martin Muhr, Odd Haugen and Glenn Ross to win the championship.

== Personal records ==
- Raw Deadlift – 340 kg (750 lb) (2003 Sword of Matúš Čák)
- Log press – 150 kg (331 lb) (2002 Strongman Super Series Sweden Grand Prix)
- Axle press (for reps) – 120 kg (265 lb) x 15 reps (2000 Beauty and the Beast) (Joint-World Record)
- IronMind Rolling Thunder (V1) – 117.3 kg (258.6 lb) (2001 Rolling Thunder World Championship) (Former World Record)
- Hercules hold (car setup) – 317.5 kg (700 lb) for 41.31 seconds (1999 IFSA Czech Grand Prix) (World Record)
