= Milo (magazine) =

American strength sports magazine

- Editor-in-chief: Randall J. Strossen
- Categories: Strength training
- Frequency: Quarterly
- Publisher: IronMind
- First issue: April 1993; 33 years ago
- Final issue: March 2018; 8 years ago
- Country: United States
- Language: English
- Website: ironmind.com/product-info/media-more/about-milo/

MILO: A Journal For Serious Strength Athletes was a quarterly journal dedicated to strength sports, published by IronMind. It was published continually from April 1993 to March 2018. The magazine was named after Milo of Croton.

== History and profile ==
Randall J. Strossen was the publisher and editor-in-chief. It was part of IronMind Enterprises, Inc. The journal covered topics such as Olympic-style weightlifting, strongman, Highland Games, powerlifting, general weight training, and fitness, arm wrestling, grip strength, stones and stonelifting, and similar subjects.
