= Richard Sorin =

American strongman

- Born: June 26, 1950; Columbia, South Carolina
- Died: June 2, 2024 (aged 73); Columbia, South Carolina
- Occupations: Strength athlete and exercise equipment manufacturer
- Known for: Grip strength
- Height: 195.5 cm (6 ft 5 in)

Richard 'Pops' Sorin (June 26, 1950 - June 3, 2024) was an American strongman and a grip strength specialist.

== Career ==
Sorin developed noteworthy grip strength at a young age. At only 13 he managed to pinch grip a pair of 35 lb (15.9 kg) York Barbell plates. Coupled with a background of collegiate track and field and national level olympic weightlifting, Sorin rose to prominence, establishing himself as an icon among the grip training fraternity. In 1991, he became the first man to officially close the IronMind Captains of Crush No.3 gripper which is recognized as the gold standard in world class crush grip. The feat earned him the nickname 'grip king'. In 2007 at the age of 57, Sorin re-certified on the No.3 gripper, which requires 127 kg (280 lb)/ RGC 149 of pressure to close, becoming the oldest person to achieve the feat.

Also among his examples of grip strength are repetitively pinch gripping a couple of old York 45 lb (20.4 kg) deep dish plates with thin rounded edges which are 4 inches (10 cm) thick together, lifting a 201 lb (91 kg) anvil and snatching 100 lb (45 kg) anvils while holding them by their horns, performing 7 reps with the Captains of Crush No.3 gripper, closing the 'Phantom 4' gripper, a max pinched grip of 123 lb (56 kg), Rolling Thunder of 235 lb (107 kg), lifting the 172 lb (78 kg) Thomas Inch dumbbell, the original 50 lb (23 kg) 'fatman' Blob and his 1,331 lb (604 kg) rack pull lockout hold with a raw grip.

In March 2023 Sorin was inducted into the International Sports Hall of Fame.

== Other ventures ==
Sorin was the founder of 'Sorinex' strength training equipment.
