= Forging manipulator =

Machine for open-die forging

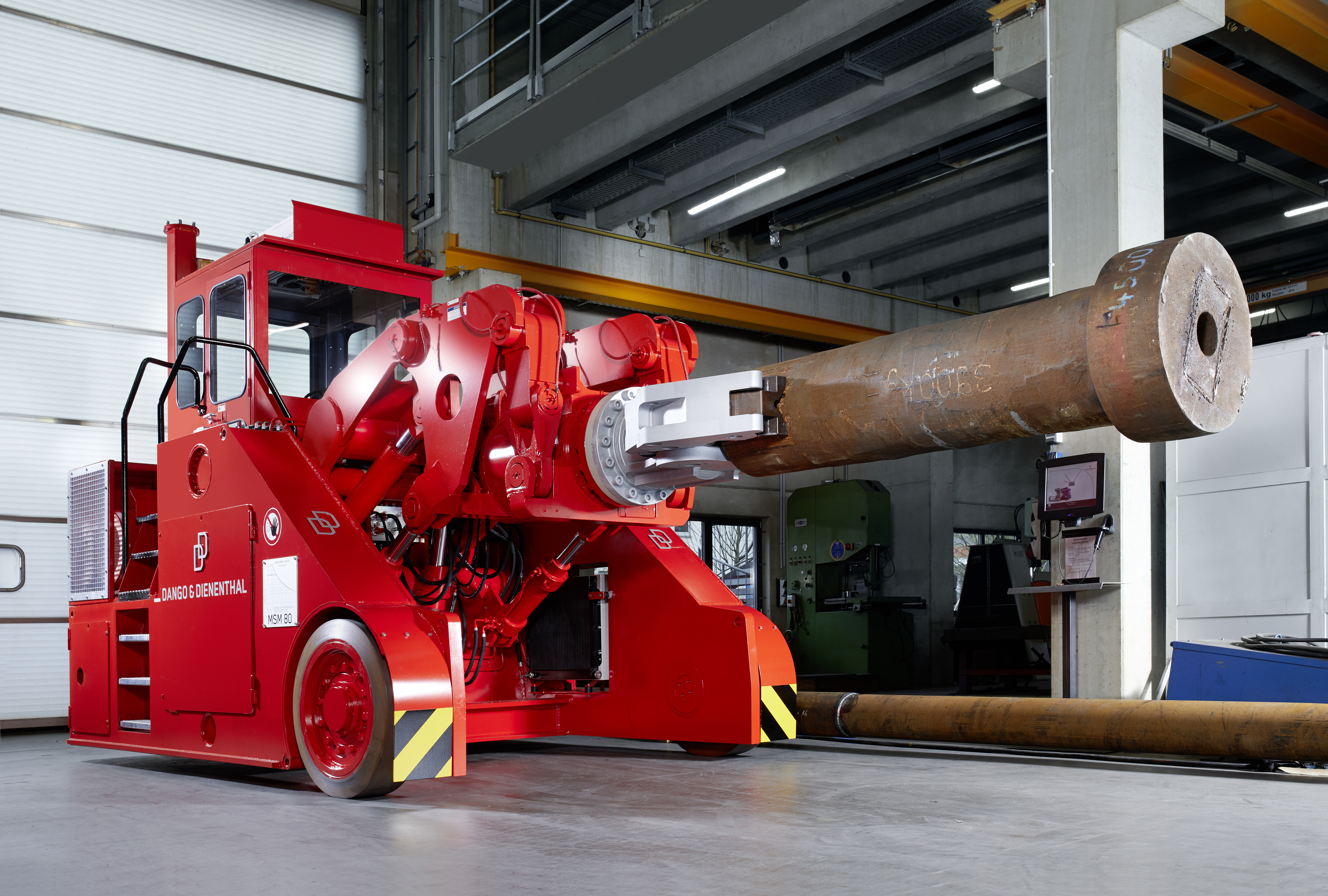
Mobile forging manipulator by Dango & Dienenthal

A forging manipulator is a vehicle used for handling and positioning workpieces in an open-die forge. It moves and positions the workpieces during the forging process and, depending on the design, also transports them between the reheating furnace and the forging press or forging hammer. Forging manipulators are manufactured as either rail-bound or freely movable (mobile) versions.

== History ==
The first forging manipulator was probably built in 1897 by Vickers in the United States and was powered by a steam engine. The first successful version was produced in 1925 by the company of John Baker and Henry Bessemer, Baker & Bessemer Co., in Kilnhurst, England (South Yorkshire).

The Baker & Bessemer Co. forging manipulator formed part of a comprehensive modernization of axle production, which included a continuous furnace, an improved steam hammer, and the forging manipulator itself. It was specifically designed for forging railway axles under a 5-ton steam hammer and, for the first time, enabled the safe handling of workpieces despite the high impact loads generated during forging. Unlike the forging manipulators used in the United States at that time, the machine incorporated several innovative design features, including a parallel lift mechanism, parallel-guided gripper jaws, and an integrated length measuring system. Since the transition to the new process initially required new operating skills, the full potential of the installation was not realized until 1927. Even about four decades later, the design was still regarded as pioneering.

In Germany, Dango & Dienenthal began manufacturing forging manipulators under American license in 1936. Herbert Dienenthal had acquired the corresponding licenses during a multi-year stay at Brosius in Pittsburgh. Initially, freely movable forging manipulators with a lifting capacity of 2 tonnes were manufactured, followed later by rail-bound versions.

As forging manipulators became more widespread, their designs were continuously improved and patented. Early developments include a mechanically driven forging manipulator by D. Kendall (1919) as well as a bearing system developed by W. D. Keller and D. Kendall to absorb the impact loads generated during forging (1936). In 1937, Herbert Dienenthal patented a self-propelled device for holding and turning heavy forgings. Further improvements followed with the patent by Edgar E. Brosius (1941) and a rail-free hydraulic forging manipulator developed by S. W. Taylor (1955).

== Types ==
Forging manipulators are used for handling workpieces throughout the entire forging process. Their tasks include gripping, transporting, lifting, rotating, and positioning the workpieces between the individual forming operations. Their short cycle and positioning times support a continuous forging process and contribute to the efficient utilization of forging presses and forging hammers. Forging manipulators are generally classified into rail-bound and freely movable (mobile) versions.

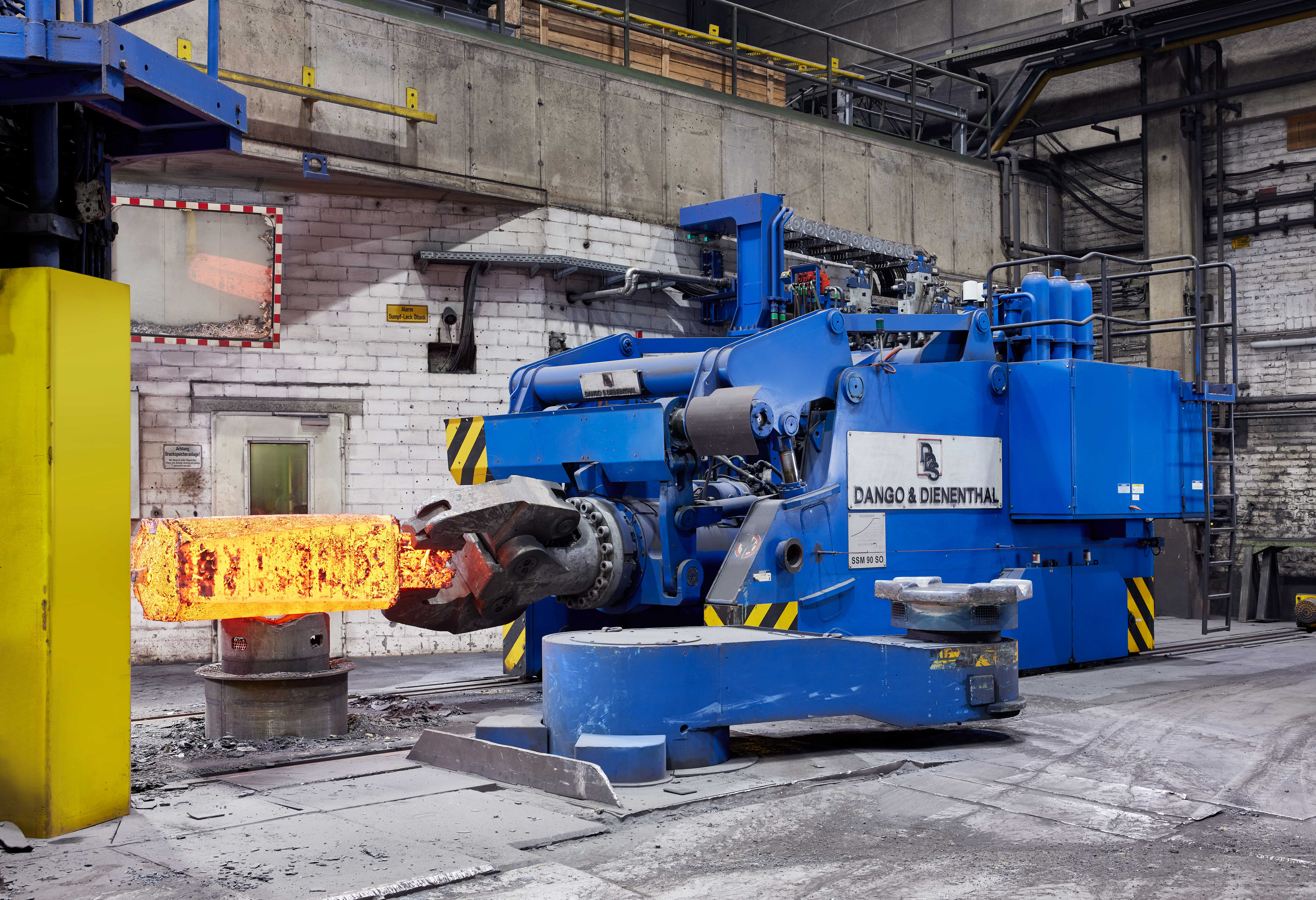
Rail-bound forging manipulator with forging workpiece

Rail-bound forging manipulators operate on a rail-mounted carriage and represent the most commonly used design. Guidance on rails enables particularly precise and stable workpiece handling and is especially suitable for forging plants with permanently installed forging lines. The most powerful models achieve load capacities of up to 2,550 kN and load moments of up to 7,500 kNm.

The motion mechanism of rail-bound forging manipulators consists of several interconnected links, hydraulic drives, and articulated joints. Electrohydraulic lifting mechanisms are used to raise and lower the gripper. Modern systems are equipped with hydraulic drives and electronic control systems whose movements can be synchronized with those of the forging press or forging hammer. This enables precise and repeatable positioning of workpieces throughout the forging process.

Freely movable (mobile) forging manipulators are not restricted to a rail system and can move freely within the working area. They are primarily used for loading and unloading reheating furnaces and for transporting workpieces between the reheating furnace and the forging press or forging hammer. They are particularly suitable for small and medium-sized forgings.

They are predominantly hydraulically powered. The hydraulic systems control the travel of the manipulator as well as the lifting, tilting, and hydraulic balancing of the gripper. During the forging process, the lifting, tilting, and balancing systems operate in coordination with the movements of the forging press in order to avoid additional stresses on both the manipulator and the workpiece. Heavy-duty forging manipulators employ serial, parallel, or hybrid serial-parallel kinematics, with parallel kinematic mechanisms being particularly suitable because of their high stiffness and favorable ratio of load capacity to dead weight.

Rail-bound and freely movable (mobile) forging manipulators can also be operated in tandem mode. In this configuration, two opposing manipulators work synchronously on the same workpiece. This operating mode is particularly used for forging long and heavy workpieces in order to prevent deflection of the workpiece. Rail-bound and mobile forging manipulators can also be combined in tandem operation.
