= Gripper =

A gripper is something that grips things or makes it easier to grip things. It may refer to:

- grippers, tools for building hand strength
- a Robot end effector, the "hand" of a robot
- a person working in a grip (job), a position held in filmmaking
