= Dango & Dienenthal =

- Type: Private
- Industry: Machine construction; Filtration technology
- Founded: June 1, 1865; 161 years ago in Siegen, Germany
- Founders: August Dango, Louis Dienenthal
- Headquarters: Hagener Str. 103, 57072 Siegen, Germany
- Key people: Jens-Uwe Heitsch, Alexander Neff (Managing Directors, operational management) Rainer Dango, Jörg Dienenthal, Andreas Dango (Shareholders)
- Operating income: ▲€ 160,5 Mio. (2023)
- Number of employees: >850 (2025)
- Website: dango-dienenthal.com

Dango & Dienenthal is a German mechanical engineering company based in Siegen that specializes in the development and manufacturing of special machinery for metallurgy, melting, forging, and heat treatment of semi-finished products made of steel and non-ferrous metals. In addition, Dango & Dienenthal is active in the field of filter technology, offering filtration systems for liquids used across various industrial sectors. The company is owned by the founding families in the fifth generation.

== History ==
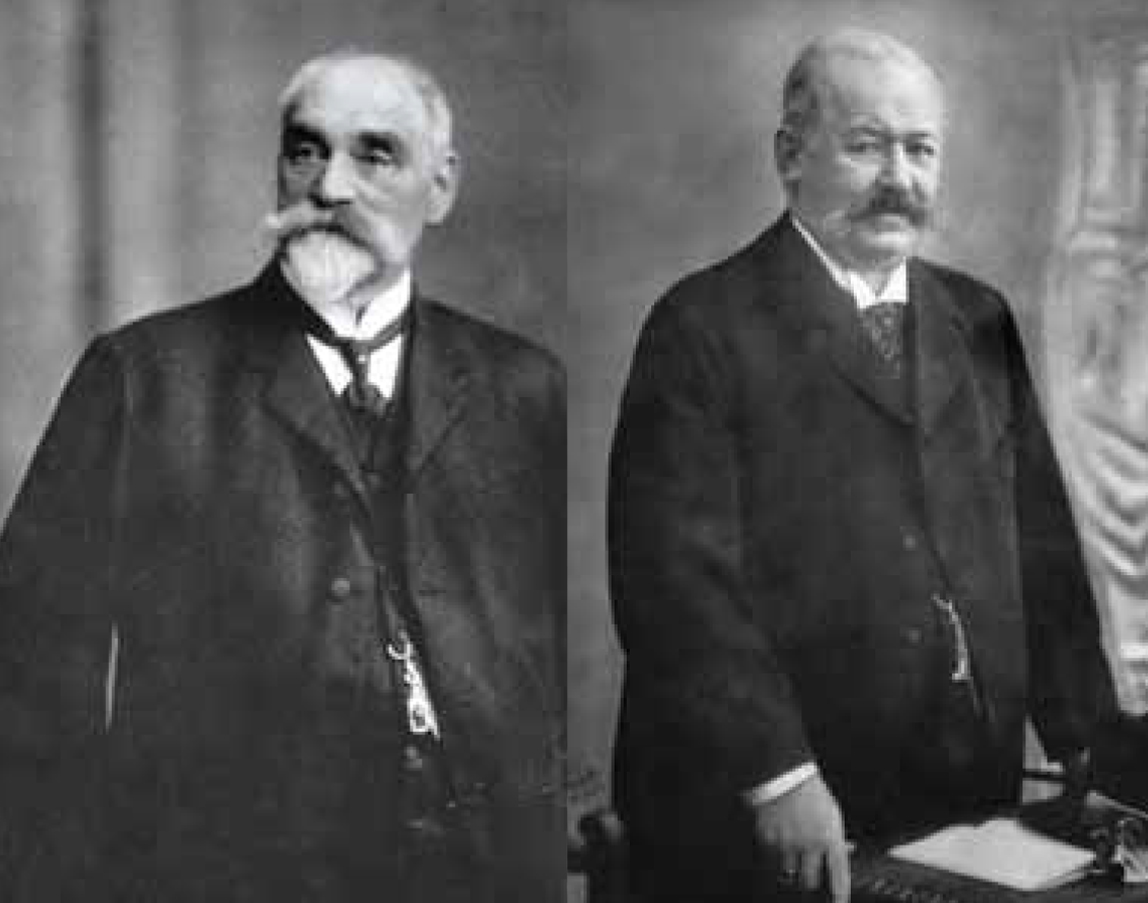
August Dango and Louis Dienenthal

Dango & Dienenthal was founded on 1 June 1865 by August Dango (1837–1924) and Louis Dienenthal (1838–1906) in Siegen. It began as a non-ferrous metal foundry and turning shop producing small cast metal fittings made of bronze and gunmetal. The official entry in the company register was made on 16 July 1865. In 1871, the company received its first steam boiler, enabling the production of larger fittings as well as iron and machine castings. Between 1899 and 1900, a new foundry was built at the Siegen site.

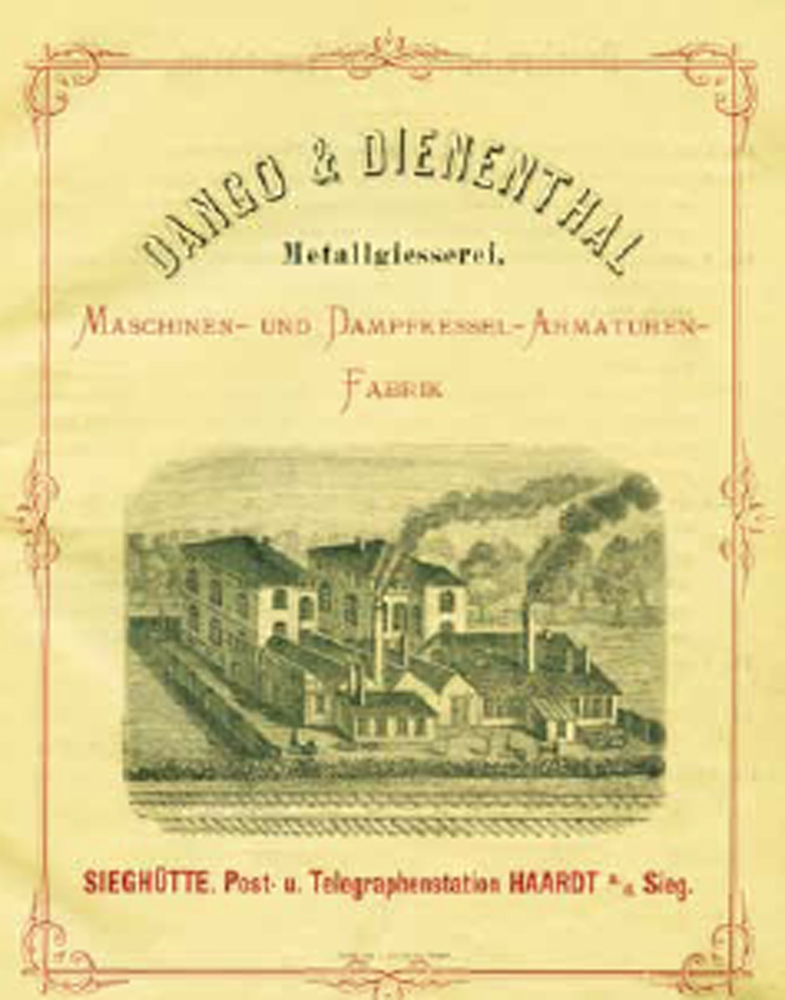
Catalogue 1880

With the departure of the founders in 1899 (August Dango) and 1901 (Louis Dienenthal), the management passed to the second generation. In 1936, another generational change took place: Bernhard Dango (1902–1981) and Herbert Dienenthal (1904–1994) assumed management and converted the company into a limited partnership (Kommanditgesellschaft). The focus increasingly shifted toward mechanical engineering. Shortly before the German attack in 1941, Dango & Dienenthal delivered major orders to the Soviet steel industry.

In Siegen, an office extension and a social building were erected in 1938/39; the workforce comprised about 250 people. Despite full order books, the war led to shortages of raw materials, loss of personnel due to conscription, and restricted exports. The company produced war-relevant machinery and employed forced laborers on a large scale. Of 200 employees in 1944, 60 were foreign forced laborers. One known victim was Anna Sahirna, born in 1921 in the USSR, who died in Siegen of pulmonary tuberculosis in 1943.

In 1944, the Dango & Dienenthal plant was largely destroyed in air raids and was almost completely wiped out by the end of the war. The production facilities and the historic residential building of the founding family were destroyed. After World War II, reconstruction began under Herbert Dienenthal and Bernhard Dango, despite a restricted production permit from 1947.

During the 1950s and 1960s, modernization and expansion of the company buildings took place. Production of blow molds, which had been manufactured for more than 100 years, was discontinued between 1963 and 1965. In the 1960s and 1970s, the fourth generation of both families joined the company. Manfred Dango, born in 1935, took over management in 1969, and Jörg Dienenthal, born in 1943, joined in 1973. Both had international training experience, particularly in the US and the UK. The product range now included taphole closing and drilling machines, blast furnace horizontal measuring probes, skimming machines, charging and poking devices, manipulators, and tool changing systems.

From 1978, an organizational separation was made into a holding company (Dango & Dienenthal KG) and an operating company (Dango & Dienenthal Maschinenbau GmbH). At the main plant, the assembly hall and office space were expanded to allow the production of larger machines weighing up to 265 tons. In 1982, the company founded its first international subsidiary in South Africa, followed in 1986 by another in the USA. In 1990, the filter technology division was spun off as an independent subsidiary.

In 1991, Dango & Dienenthal briefly faced criticism regarding a delivery contract with Iraq but was able to refute the accusations. From the late 1980s onward, production was gradually digitalized through the introduction of CAD and CNC technology.

At the end of the 1990s, further subsidiaries were founded: in 1998 a production site in India with around 25 employees, and in 1999 a sales and service company in Japan. At the beginning of 2001, Manfred Dango handed over management to his son Rainer Dango (born 1963). In 2009, Arno Dienenthal (born 1973) joined him, representing the fifth generation of the company.

In 2003, a cooperation was established with Luxembourg-based Paul Wurth. The collaboration resulted in the Tapping Measuring Technology (TMT) joint venture, with locations in Siegen and Luxembourg. According to the Association of German Chambers of Industry and Commerce Siegen, TMT is listed as a world market leader in tapping and measuring technology for blast furnaces and for melting furnaces in the non ferrous sector. Production takes place mainly at Dango & Dienenthal in Siegen. With the acquisition of Kring Transfer Technologie (TWT Kring, now Oventrop Energy & Network ) in 2009, TMT expanded its business activities, but it no longer holds any shares in the company today.

In 2015, Hencon B.V. became part of the Dango & Dienenthal Group. The company is divided into two business units: Hencon Metal & Mining, which develops and produces machinery for the aluminum and mining industries; and Hencon Forestry, which specializes in machinery for forestry and biomass production.

Since 2023, the management team has been supplemented by Jens-Uwe Heitsch and Alexander Neff. Rainer Dango, Andreas Dango, and Jörg Dienenthal remain shareholders. Andreas Dango additionally assumed the management of TMT in 2023.

== Products ==
The company manufactures special purpose machinery used in metallurgical processes. According to the business ranking Die Deutsche Wirtschaft, Dango & Dienenthal is listed as a world market leader in the segment of forging manipulators. Dango & Dienenthal manufactures machinery for open-die forging, closed-die forging, and ring rolling, as well as equipment for the heat treatment of forged products, and machinery for the liquid phase of metal production. In addition, Dango & Dienenthal developed a pipe manufacturing machine that combines measurement and sizing in a single unit. The company also offers contract manufacturing services.

== Corporate structure ==
The Dango & Dienenthal Group comprises several subsidiaries and brands specializing in different sectors, including filter technology, heavy mechanical engineering, and technologies for the metal industry.

The group includes several brands, such as Dango & Dienenthal, Hencon, and TMT.

Dango & Dienenthal Maschinenbau GmbH manufactures special machinery and systems for the metallurgical industry. The company's expertise includes melting, forging, and heat treatment of forged products. It also offers contract manufacturing services. The company is considered a global market leader in machinery for the metallurgical industry, with a strong focus on advanced handling systems for forging plants.

Dango & Dienenthal Filtertechnik GmbH develops and manufactures filtration systems for liquids that are used in almost all industrial sectors. These systems filter, among other things, river water, cooling water, process water and other liquid media. The product range includes automatic and manual filtration systems as well as separators, such as the "Mussel Stop" system for combating mussel larvae, particularly zebra mussels, in industrial cooling systems.

Hencon B.V. focuses on the development, production, and maintenance of mobile special-purpose equipment for the aluminum, mining, and forestry industries. Hencon Forestry is the official distributor of John Deere forestry machines and serves roughly one-third of Germany's forested area as a sales and service partner.

TMT Tapping Measuring Technology GmbH, a joint venture of Dango & Dienenthal and Paul Wurth, manufactures taphole and measuring technology for blast furnaces and melting furnaces in metallurgy. The company provides products and services in taphole technology and measuring systems for blast furnaces and non-ferrous metallurgy, including the development, production, distribution, and maintenance of taphole machines and probes.
