= Hand strength =

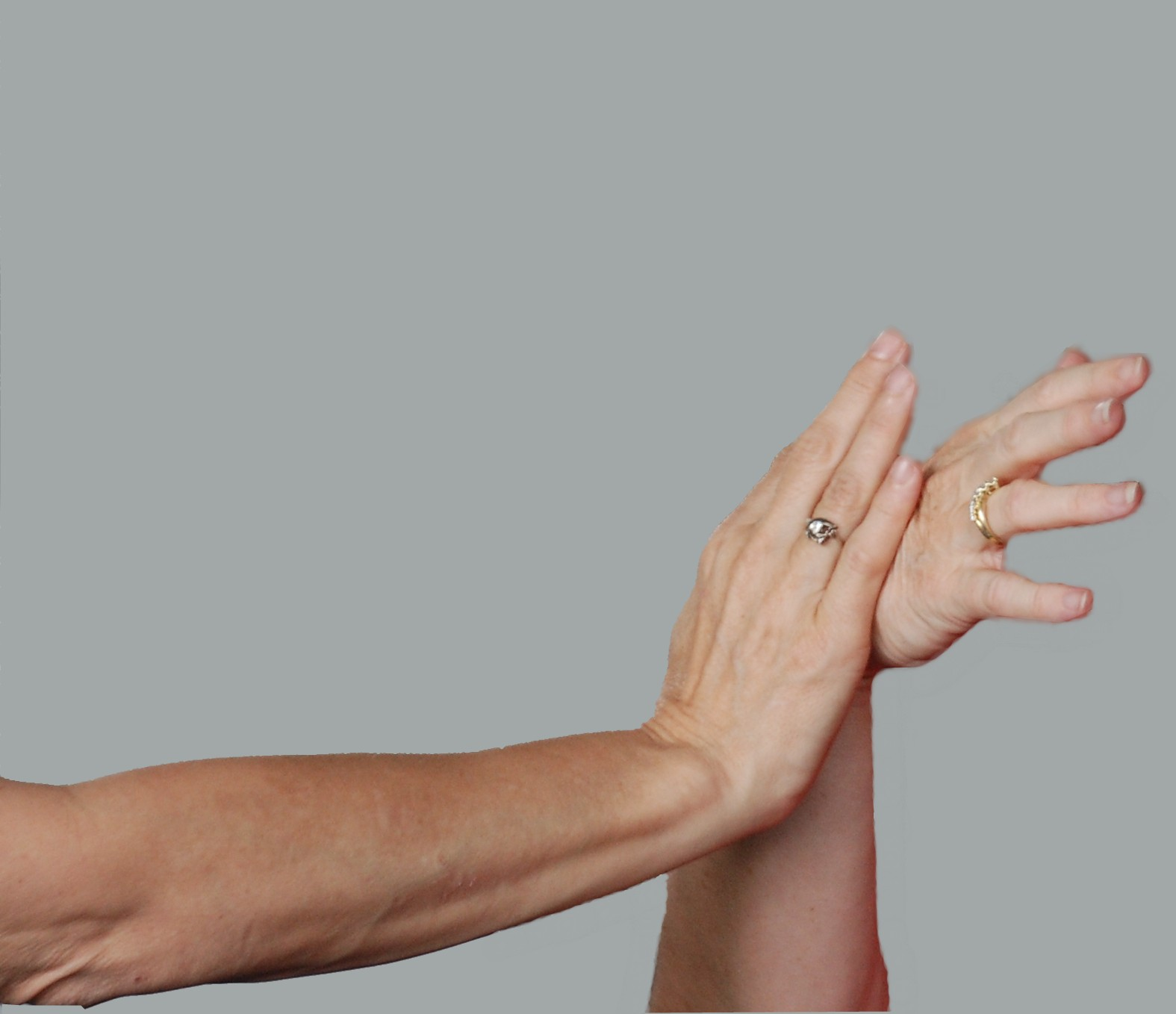
Two tai chi practitioners participate in Pushing hands, an exercise particularly involving the use of hand strength and flexibility

Hand strength measurements are of interest to study pathology of the hand that involves loss of muscle strength. Examples of these pathologies are carpal tunnel syndrome, nerve injury, tendon injuries of the hand, and neuromuscular disorders. Hand strength testing is frequently used for clinical decision-making and outcome evaluation in evidence-based medicine. It is used to diagnose diseases, to evaluate and compare treatments, to document progression of muscle strength, and to provide feedback during the rehabilitation process. In addition, strength testing is often used in areas such as sports medicine and ergonomics. In general, hand strength measurements can be divided into manual muscle testing and dynamometry.

== Manual muscle strength testing of the hand muscles ==
In clinical practice, hand muscles are most often evaluated using manual muscle strength testing using the Medical Research Council (MRC) Scale. In this scale, muscle strength is graded on a scale from 0 to 5. For evaluating the strength of the intrinsic hand muscles, a small modification to the standard MRC grading has been made so that grade 3 indicates ‘full active range of motion’ as compared to ‘movement against gravity’:

=== Modified Medical Research Council Scale for measuring hand muscles ===
Grade 5: full active range of motion & Normal muscle resistance

Grade 4: full active range of motion & Reduced muscle resistance

Grade 3: full active range of motion & No muscle resistance

Grade 2: Reduced active range of motion & No muscle resistance

Grade 1: No active range of motion & Palpable muscle contraction only

Grade 0: No active range of motion & No palpable muscle contraction

Manual muscle testing, however, has a number of limitations. One limitation is that the MRC scale is an ordinal scale with disproportional distances between grades. Another limitation of the MRC scale is that the scoring depends on the judgment of the examiner. Finally, with the 6-point ordinal MRC scale, it is difficult to identify relatively small but clinically relevant changes in muscle strength.

== Grip and pinch dynamometry ==
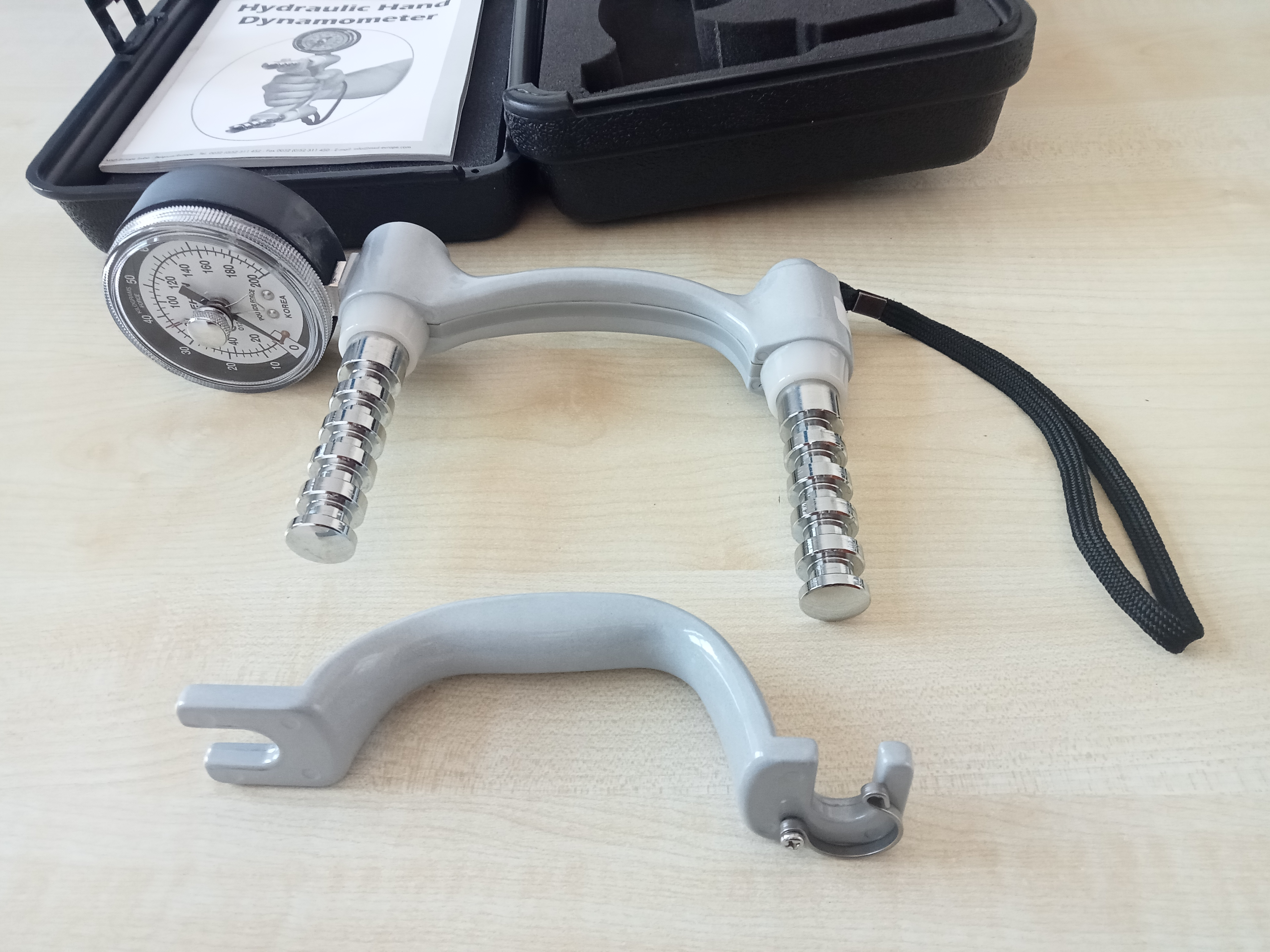
Hand grip dynamometer, "Jamar" type

To create more quantitative assessments of hand muscle strength, dynamometers have been developed. These dynamometer measurements are more sensitive to change compared to manual muscle testing and render outcome on a continuous scale. In clinical evaluation and research studies on patients with hand problems, muscle strength measurements are usually based on grip strength and pinch strength dynamometry. The most commonly used grip and pinch dynamometers are the Jamar dynamometers and similar devices by other manufacturers. In several patients groups, these measurements have a good reliability and validity. In addition, grip- and pinch strength are functionally relevant to measure the combined action of a large number of intrinsic and extrinsic hand muscles as well as the combined action of a number of different joints. By comparing outcome with normative data, the amount of muscle strength loss can be determined.

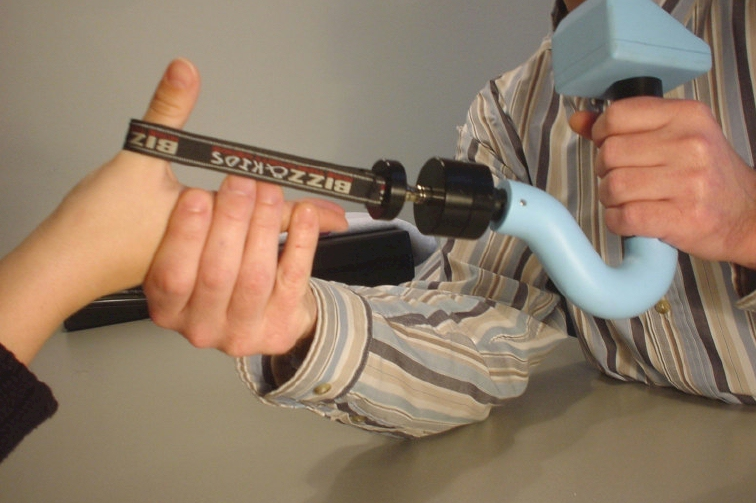
Measurement of the palmar abduction of the thumb with the Rotterdam Intrinsic Hand Myometer (RIHM)

== Dynamometry of the intrinsic hand muscles ==
For more specific dynamometry of the intrinsic muscles, intrinsic hand dynamometers have been developed. The advantage of these dynamometers is that they to do not measure a large number of muscles in combined action, but can measure single actions such as thumb opposition of index finger abduction. One such dynamometer is the Rotterdam Intrinsic Hand Myometer (RIHM). Reliability and validity of this dynamometer is comparable to grip- and pinch dynamometers.
