= GNC Grip Gauntlet =

Strength athletics contest

The GNC Grip Gauntlet (officially GNC Pro Performance Grip Gauntlet) was a strength athletics contest that tested the grip strength of athletes over three disciplines, each designed to test one of the three recognized facets of hand strength: crushing; pinching and supporting.

It was developed by brothers Brad Gillingham and Wade Gillingham and became an internationally recognised contest featured at some of the world's most prominent strength athletics events and expos, including the Arnold Strongman Classic and various WSM Super Series Grand Prix's. The last time the GNC Grip Gauntlet was run in a competitive format was the 2010 Arnold Classic. Since then it has changed to an informal challenge with no official results maintained. Prizes are still awarded for successful completion of the challenge.

== History ==
In 2002 Gillingham brothers and General Nutrition Center (GNC) introduced Blob Challenge in the GNC booth at the Mr. Olympia in Las Vegas, Nevada. After two successful editions, wanting to expand the challenge, they came up with the idea to test 3 main facets of grip strength: crushing strength, pinching strength and supporting strength. Therefore Wade approached Randall J. Strossen from IronMind Enterprises to get permission to use Captains of Crush Grippers as part of the challenge. In conversation with Strossen it was decided that Wade's original idea to use a Thomas Inch dumbbell replica for the supporting grip challenge should be replaced with the IronMind Rolling Thunder.

The GNC Pro Performance Grip Gauntlet debuted at the 2004 Arnold Expo Challenge. The three implements used were the No. 3 Captains of Crush gripper, the York Blob and the Rolling Thunder. An estimated 20,000 competitors at Fitness Expos over a 7-year run from 2004 to 2010 tested their hands at the GNC Grip Gauntlet. (Note: As to the stature of the Gauntlet, Wade Gillingham quoted after 2007 edition: "If you think this challenge isn't world class, think again. Over the past four years, an estimated 10,000 attempts have been made to complete the three challenges on the GNC Grip Gauntlet stage and only two individuals have ever completed all three in the ‘heavy’ format". The two individuals to whom Wade Gillingham was referring were Monty Brown, and himself. During the next three years, Tex Henderson, John Connor, Karl Gillingham, Rich Williams, Andrew Durniat and Brian Shaw were certified.)

The Gauntlet eventually settled on three formats: Light, Medium and Heavy. In early 2009, the weight of the Rolling Thunder was dropped from 212 lb (96 kg) to 207 lb (94 kg), to correspond with IronMind's new version of the Rolling Thunder. In 2010 due to changes in the Rolling Thunder and a change from Captain's of Crush grippers to the new Gillingham High Performance (GHP) grippers, it was decided by Wade Gillingham that the historical integrity of the event was no longer sound enough to continue compiling a list of winners.

== Disciplines ==
The disciplines of crushing, pinching and supporting were tested. Crushing, used the IronMind Captains of Crush grippers, Pinching used the York Blob and Supporting was tested using IronMind Rolling Thunder.

Implement	Light Format	Medium Format	Heavy Format
Captains of Crush gripper	#2	#2.5	#3
York Blob	50 lb (22.7 kg)		
Rolling Thunder	187 lb (84.8 kg)	197 lb (89.4 kg)	207 lb (93.9 kg)

=== Captains of Crush Gripper ===
Torsion-spring hand grippers date back at least as far as the beginning of the 20th century. In 1964, IronMind introduced heavy duty grippers which are now known as 'Captains of Crush'. By 2004, there were five models in increasing difficulty to close (The Trainer, No. 1, No. 2, No. 3 and No. 4) and the selected gripper was the No.3. With the introduction of three more bridge grippers in 2006 (No. 1.5, No. 2.5 and No. 3.5), the challenge was offered in three different levels. For the light format, it was required to close the No. 2 gripper. For the medium format No. 2.5 was the requirement and for the heavy format it was the No. 3 gripper.

Through IronMind's certification program which was also run in parallel to the GNC Grip Gauntlet, a lot of individuals certified themselves in the official certification list for the No. 3 Captains of Crush gripper which is now widely considered the gold standard of world class crush grip strength. During final years of the gauntlet, they switched to Gillingham High Performance (GHP) grippers.

=== York Blob ===
York Blob was the sole challenge of GNC Grip Gauntlet in its two initial years. The challenge was to pinch grip and lift a 50 lb (22.7 kg) iron blob. The history of this implement goes back to the 60s when Richard Sorin was asked to refurbish the weight room at University of South Carolina. Sorin noticed one half of a discarded 100 lbs first generation York roundhead dumbbell with a near broken handle which he moved to his YMCA gym. He then removed the remnants of the handle and used the 50 lbs belly of the dumbbell for pinch grip training. He named it the 'Blob' because it was just a blob of iron.

The first generation of York dumbbell bellies protruded out more from the edges making them more difficult to lift. They were called 'Fatman Blobs' for this reason. Wade Gillingham holds the world record for the heaviest first generation blob lift at 81 lb (37 kg) with extra weight attached on a half 100 blob. Blobs used at GNC Grip Gauntlet were made from second generation York dumbbells which were slightly sleeker hence relatively easier than the first generation. The weight always remained 50 lbs, derived from Sorin's original half 100 blob.

=== Rolling Thunder ===
Rolling Thunder's history goes back more than a decade before the Gauntlet first existed. IronMind developed the Rolling Thunder in 1993 and it is now a grip staple. One-hand deadlifts had long been a preferred means of testing and building grip strength and Rolling Thunder itself is a thick revolving deadlift handle (length: 7 1/2" (rotating portion is 6") and diameter: 2 3/8") to which weights can be attached.

Such is the rise of its popularity that Rolling Thunder competitions are often held in conjunction with major strongman events, grip competitions and expos. Early on in its history, in 1993, Ironmind issued a challenge to the world of strongmen to lift 300 lbs with Rolling Thunder, and it took 15 years for this challenge to be met when Mark Felix performed the feat at the 2008 Mohegan Sun Grand Prix, in the process becoming Rolling Thunder World Champion.
