= Captains of Crush Grippers =

Brand of torsion-spring grippers

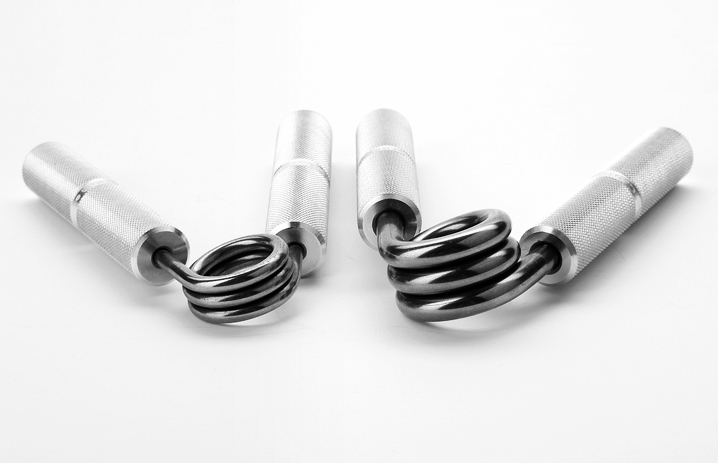
A couple of Captains of Crush gripper models: Trainer (Left) and No. 4 (Right)

Captains of Crush Grippers (commonly nicknamed "CoC") is a brand of torsion-spring grippers (a torsion spring fitted with two handles) designed, manufactured and sold by IronMind Enterprises, Inc., based in Nevada City, California. Through IronMind's certification program for people who have officially closed any of the three toughest models (No. 3, No. 3.5 and No. 4), Captains of Crush Grippers have become an internationally recognized measure of world class grip strength.

IronMind founder and president Randall J. Strossen wrote a book in 2003, Captains of Crush Grippers: What They Are and How to Close Them, to address some of the myths and questions surrounding CoC Grippers.

== History ==
Torsion-spring grippers date back at least as far as the beginning of the 20th century, and are used for both testing and building grip strength. Historically, torsion-spring grippers were not considered serious training tools because, among other things, they were not very difficult to close.

In 1964, Iron Man Magazine advertised a new line of grippers called the "Super Heavy Iron Man Grip Developer." These grippers had steel handles and thick springs and an "arguably somewhat primitive" design, but what distinguished them from torsion-spring grippers of the past was how difficult the Iron Man grippers were to close. The Iron Man ad billed the grippers as the "world's strongest grip[pers] of this type."

Iron Man Magazine had stopped advertising its grippers in 1977 due to lack of sales, but the grippers had some followers, one of whom was IronMind founder Randall J. Strossen. In 1990, Strossen contacted Warren Tetting, who had made the Iron Man Grippers, and asked if he would be interested in making grippers for IronMind. The design of the original Iron Man Grippers varied in such features as the diameter of their handles, whether or not the handles were knurled, and whether the grippers had keepers on the springs. Warren gave out prototypes to various of strongmen to test the grippers. After a series of the grippers were broken by Gary "The Gripper" Stich he contacted Warren about the design. Gary pointed out that they were breaking as the springs were welded and suggested a pin be placed in them instead.

IronMind sought to refine these nutcracker-style grippers, first by improving their consistency and standardizing their features. The company introduced its grippers in the summer of 1990 in three different strengths (#1, #2 and #3) and with standardized features such as knurled handles.

In subsequent models, IronMind continued improving the accuracy, durability and appearance of the grippers. At the end of 1990, IronMind introduced the "Silver Crush Gripper", which had chrome-plated handles and springs, a uniform knurling pattern, and the same three models of increasing difficulty as the first group: the No. 1, No. 2 and No. 3. Leading grip-strength figures as Richard Sorin and John Brookfield were early users.

== Design ==
By 1992, IronMind had moved all design and production of its grippers in-house. The next generation of the Silver Crush Grippers, released in 1993, marked the next major step in gripper evolution; their stainless-steel handles replaced the previous chrome-plated mild steel handles, and a new assembly technique eliminated the drift pin central to the design of the older grippers. IronMind briefly offered a model with a right-hand wind spring, although that design was soon shelved in order to concentrate on the more popular left-hand wind spring. The new design also featured a clear band at the midpoint of each handle, an element of trade dress for IronMind's grippers ever since.

In 1993, IronMind began stamping the bottoms of its gripper handles to indicate the difficulty level of each individual gripper (e.g. T, 1, 2, or 3), a move that eliminated errors about exactly which gripper was being closed.

In 1995 IronMind released the Captains of Crush Grippers, which pioneered the use of knurled, aircraft-grade aluminum handles, which made the grippers lighter and provided a more secure grip. Over the years, IronMind has advanced the precision, durability, and appearance of the grippers, but their basic design has remained consistent since 1995, with milestones including the introduction of its proprietary GR8 springs in CoC Grippers in 2005.

== Models ==
IronMind's original grippers, introduced in 1990, came in three levels of increasing difficulty: No. 1, No. 2 and No. 3, with the No. 3 being the most difficult to close. They continue to define the core of the Captains of Crush product line.

In 1992, IronMind introduced the Trainer, a gripper somewhat easier to close than the No. 1.

In 1994, IronMind released its most difficult gripper, the No. 4. Later they introduced two new models in 2004 that were easier to close than the Trainer: the Guide and the Sport. The company released three "bridge grippers" in 2006 — No. 1.5, No. 2.5 and No 3.5 —, then finally, the No. 0.5 in 2011, bringing the total number of gripper models it sells to 11.

All 11 models share the same basic features and are made in the United States of America.

== Calibration ==
The concept of calibration entered the gripper world when IronMind compared the variation among grippers to that in uncalibrated barbell plates to explain why there may be slight variations from one gripper to another.

Most barbell plates are uncalibrated, which means that they rarely weigh precisely the same as their face value, but a calibrated barbell plate must meet established criteria. In the gripper world, Strossen writes, some people mistakenly call a gripper calibrated when it has merely been rated for its level of difficulty.

Ironically, while IronMind introduced the idea of gripper calibration and discussed its limitations, Captains of Crush Grippers—especially the No. 3 Gripper—became the de facto standard by which other grippers were measured. In 2004, IronMind made some adjustments to its benchmark No. 3 Gripper to ensure that it conformed to its historical standards, making it a truly calibrated gripper.

=== Poundage rating ===
IronMind developed an approximate poundage-rating system for its grippers in 1993, outlined in Captains of Crush Grippers: What They Are and How to Close Them, that provided a quick way to define the relative difficulty of closing one model of CoC Gripper compared to another. It estimates what the poundage might be to close it if the pressure was applied in the center of the handle on the gripper. IronMind has also pointed out that even under the best circumstances such numbers can be misleading and are easily abused, and stresses that all gripper poundage ratings—including its own—should be taken with a grain of salt.

In 2012, Cannon PowerWorks introduced the RGC (Redneck Gripper Calibration) method where it determines the actual poundage required to close each gripper, tested out near the end of the handle.

The following chart, lists both originally published IronMind poundage's from the center of the handle, and the Cannon PowerWorks RGC poundage's from the end of the handle.

Gripper	IronMind poundage (from the center of the handle)	RGC poundage (as of January 2026) (from the end of the handle)
Guide	60.0 lb (27.2 kg)	27.0 lb (12.2 kg)
Sport	80.0 lb (36.3 kg)	37.0 lb (16.8 kg)
Trainer	100.0 lb (45.4 kg)	54.0 lb (24.5 kg)
No. 0.5*	120.0 lb (54.4 kg)	66.0 lb (29.9 kg)
**No. 1**	140.0 lb (63.5 kg)	75.0 lb (34.0 kg)
No. 1.5*	167.5 lb (76.0 kg)	85.0 lb (38.6 kg)
**No. 2**	195.0 lb (88.5 kg)	103.0 lb (46.7 kg)
No. 2.5*	237.5 lb (107.7 kg)	125.0 lb (56.7 kg)
**No. 3**	280.0 lb (127.0 kg)	148.0 lb (67.1 kg)
No. 3.5*	322.5 lb (146.3 kg)	176.0 lb (79.8 kg)
No. 4	365.0 lb (165.6 kg)	213.0 lb (96.6 kg)

(* These grippers are designed to help bridge the gap between the benchmark-level grippers, and are rated halfway between the No. 1, No. 2, No. 3, and No. 4 CoC Grippers, respectively; thus, these are their interpolated poundage ratings.) In bold text are the three original grippers.

=== Certification ===
==== Men ====
No. 3: In 1991, IronMind created a certification program to recognize people who closed the Captains of Crush No. 3 Gripper under official conditions. This certification has become the universal benchmark of world-class grip strength. Richard Sorin was the first person certified when he closed the No. 3 in 1991. John Brookfield was the second person IronMind certified when he closed the No. 3 in 1992. Since then, more than 288 people around the world have been officially certified as closing the No. 3.

No. 3.5: In 2008, IronMind expanded its certification program to include the No. 3.5 Gripper. Tex Henderson became the first person to officially close the No. 3.5 when he accomplished the feat on August 5, 2008. 21 additional people have since officially closed the No. 3.5 Captains of Crush Gripper.

No. 4: IronMind released the Captains of Crush No. 4 Gripper in 1994, but no one was officially able to close it until Joe Kinney was certified in 1998. Only five others have officially closed the No. 4 since then: Nathan Holle (2003), David Morton (2003), Tommy Heslep (2004), Magnus Samuelsson (2004) before IronMind introduced the "credit card rule" (to fit the short side (54mm) of a credit card between the handles of the gripper before it is closed) and Carl Myerscough (2023) after the introduction of the credit card rule.

A YouTube clip of Samuelsson closing the No. 4 Captains of Crush Gripper has been viewed over two million times.

==== Women ====
No. 2: In 2011, IronMind opened its certification program to recognize women who successfully closed the Captains of Crush No. 2 Gripper. Since then, four women have been certified. The first was Adriane Blewitt in 2011. In 2013, Amy Wattles and Elizabeth Horne were certified. In 2022, Lyudmila Gaiduchenko joined the list.

In 2013, IronMind expanded the certification program to No. 2.5 Gripper for women, but none have performed this feat to date.

==== Credit card rule ====
In 2008 IronMind was criticized for changing the rules on how it certifies people who have closed its Captains of Crush No. 3, No. 3.5 and No. 4 Gripper. The company decided the official starting position for any attempt must be demonstrated by fitting the short side of a credit card between the handles of the gripper before it is closed. However, some competitors protested against the new requirement claiming their hands were too small to achieve the new requirement (a small hand making a grip will create a smaller gap between the handles than a larger hand).

In response IronMind explained the requirements for certification were changed because some competitors had begun using questionable techniques to close their grippers. It maintains if anyone cannot close a Captains of Crush No. 3, No. 3.5 or No. 4 Gripper with its required starting position, but can close a weaker Captains of Crush Gripper, the reason is a lack of strength not a problem with hand size.

== Jesse Marunde and philanthropy ==
In 1998, 18-year-old Jesse Marunde became the first teenager to officially close the Captains of Crush No. 3 Gripper. "The first teenage Captain of Crush" went on to become a popular professional strongman competitor, but died on July 25, 2007, from a genetic heart defect. In Marunde's memory, IronMind has pledged to donate $500 to the educational trust fund set up for his children every time a teenager is certified on the Captains of Crush No. 3, No. 3.5 or No. 4 grippers.

IronMind also donates all the proceeds from CD sales of Trevor Laing's "Captains of Crush Song" to Doctors Without Borders.

== Related products ==
In 2007, IronMind introduced several products specifically designed to complement Captains of Crush Grippers, including the IMTUG (a two-fingered gripper) and the "CoC Key" (a tool for measuring the gap between the handles of a nearly closed Captains of Crush Gripper).

In 2005, Trevor Laing composed a song about Captains of Crush Grippers.
