= Thomas Inch =

English strongman (1881–1963)

- Inch in 1921
- Born: 27 December 1881; Scarborough, North Yorkshire, United Kingdom of Great Britain and Ireland
- Died: 12 December 1963 (aged 81); Cobham, Surrey, United Kingdom
- Occupation: Strongman
- Height: 5 ft 10.5 in (179 cm)

Thomas Inch (27 December 1881 – 12 December 1963) was a British Strongman, who held the titles of Britain's Strongest Youth, Britain's Strong Man and the originator of the Thomas Inch dumbbell challenge.

== Early life ==
Inch was born on 27 December 1881 in Scarborough, a seaside town on the North Yorkshire coast in the U.K. He became interested in bodybuilding and strength as a young boy, bodybuilding through manual labour.

== Lifting career ==
In 1902, aged 20, Inch was declared by a major 'Strongman' publication as the "World's Strongest Youth," enhancing his notoriety. His inspirations included Eugen Sandow, having seen the German ripping a pack of cards in half and throwing the split deck into the audience. Inch was said to have caught one half of the pack, proceeded to split that in half in the audience, and throw it back at Sandow.

Unlike many professional Strongmen of his day, Inch focused on standard lifts with barbells and dumbbells and left the hoisting of wooden barrels, heavy sacks of grain, pianos, or holding back a team of horses, to his contemporaries. His one exception was that he sometimes lifted human beings in the bent-press; a complicated, one-hand movement to watch.

=== Book and capitalisation on fame ===
Inch realized in order to advance his fame and fortune as a world class strongman, he needed to meet the prerequisite of publishing a well-written book pertaining to physical fitness. He accomplished this by publishing Scientific Weightlifting in 1905 and by authoring "Thomas Inch on Strength" in 1907. The following years, he traveled the British countryside performing exhibitions, selling his book, and spreading the Inch name. Inch had previously launched a mail order muscle course in 1903 which went on to sell over 40,000 copies. It was the first mail-order physical culture business in the UK.

=== Britain's Strongest Man and World Records ===
Inch went on to win the title of Britain's Strongest Man on 11 June 1910. At the age of 68, Inch was still capable of deadlifting 540 pounds (240 kg), an unofficial world record. His record lifts included a two hands anyhow of 356.5 pounds (161.7 kg) and a bent press of 304.5 pounds (138.1 kg).

In 1909, Inch, still only a middleweight, refused to compete in a weightlifting match against the Austrian Strongman Max Sick (Maxick), who had recently arrived in London. However, by 1910 Inch had become a heavyweight and so relinquished his middleweight title to Edward Aston, and a competition was quickly arranged against Sick.

== Thomas Inch dumbbell ==
Inch is known for his Thomas Inch dumbbell, also known as '172' or the 'unliftable' challenge dumbbell. The iconic dumbbell weighs 172 lbs and 9 oz. (78 1/4 kg) and is extremely difficult to lift, partly due to its sheer weight, but primarily because of its thick handle of 2 3/8" (6.03 cm) in diameter, making it difficult to hold on to without possessing outstandingly strong grip strength.

Inch claimed that he had lifted it from the floor with one hand and overheaded it 'hundreds of times', sometimes lifting it twice in the same performance. Even though the overhead portion of the lift is heavily disputed by many strength historians, it is generally agreed that Inch might have successfully lifted it off the floor to a deadlift position. Inch also claimed he never encountered anyone else who could lift it from the floor one handed, let alone 'both' to lift it and then overhead press it one handed. Numerous contemporaries such as Arthur Saxon, Maurice Deriaz, Lionel Strongfort, Ivan Poddubny and Reg Park failed to lift the dumbbell.

After Inch's death, the original dumbbell was in the possession of Reg Park for a brief period of time, and then David Prowse purchased it somewhere between 1969 and 1971. It was in his possession until 2000 where it was sold to Kim Wood (former strength coach for the Cincinnati Bengals) who brought it to the United States. Following Wood's death in January 2026, the dumbbell remains in the possession of his family.

Note: There is a hole in the original dumbbell's handle, with its purpose never explained by Inch. An IronMind article from the Holle brothers theorised that Inch could place a nail in the hole and, with the added use of a wrist strap, stop the dumbbell's rotation whilst lifting it, so as to make it easier for him to consistently lift it during an exhibition. The article also mentions about the discovery of some middleweight and lightweight dumbbells which theorised that Inch might have used them during his exhibitions and tours.

=== Legacy and replicas ===
Australia's Bruce White created the first replica of the dumbbell, and is also credited as the second man after Inch to successfully lift it. His replica was in fact slightly heavier than the original dumbbell at 79 kg (174 lb). In 1990, Bill Kazmaier flew to Perth to attempt this dumbbell and became the first man to overhead press the Inch dumbbell with proof. According to Gary Mitchell, Kazmaier was the fifth man to lift the Inch dumbbell from the floor. From the 1990s onwards, many equipment manufacturers such as Sorinex, Rogue, Slater, Gladiator, Wallace, Holle, Adamski, BruttoBells, Sahlaney, Gods of Grip and FBBC created replicas of the dumbbell, paving the way for many modern day athletes to attempt to lift it.

In 2001, Magnus Samuelsson lifted the dumbbell using a thumbless grip, and in 2002 David Horne managed to lift two dumbbells (one in each hand) using a thumbless grip. In 2002, Mark Henry completed a one-hand clean and press of the dumbbell, becoming the first man to clean the Inch dumbbell in a manner similar to Inch's claims. Since then, multiple lifters have also been able to complete a one-hand clean and press of the dumbbell, such as Carl Myerscough, Jesse Pynnönen, Ben Helms, Benny Aquilina, David Shamey or Cim Johansson. In 2016, Mike Burke lifted and carried two dumbbells in farmers walk style for 37.52 metres (123 ft 1 in).

Note: In 1990, Kazmaier successfully lifted the dumbbell off the floor with one hand, but the overhead press was after 'cleaning it using both hands'. Henry's clean in 2002 was done one handed, hence the difference between the two feats.

== Other ventures ==
Inch occasionally served as a strength and conditioning trainer to professional boxers, and helped to rehabilitate wounded soldiers at Fulham Military Hospital following World War I.

== Death ==
Inch died in Cobham, Surrey on 12 December 1963 of coronary thrombosis. His family did not keep any of his bodybuilding memorabilia following his death.

== Selected publications ==
- Inch on Fitness (1923)
- Away with Nerves (1946)
- Manual of Physical Training (1947)
- Boxing for Beginners, from Novice to Champion (1951)
