= Randall J. Strossen =

American exercise writer

Dr. Randall J. Strossen is an American strength and physical culture advocate, kinesiologist, equipment manufacturer, historian, journalist, author, teacher and an expert in grip strength training.

He is the founder and president of IronMind Enterprises, Inc. and the editor-in-chief and publisher of MILO journal. He wrote a monthly column called "IronMind" in IRONMAN magazine for over 12 years, starting in 1988 and has authored several books on strength training. As a photo-journalist, Strossen has covered top strength events, including four Olympic Games, and numerous World's Strongest Man competitions and Highland games worldwide for the past 35 years. As an equipment manufacturer, Strossen pioneered and developed Captains of Crush Grippers, Rolling Thunder and several other training devices including the little big horn, hub, block, Apollon's axle, Vulcan power racks and lifting straps.

Strossen earned a PhD in psychology from Stanford University.

== Bibliography ==
- Super Squats: How to Gain 30 Pounds of Muscle in 6 Weeks (1989). ISBN 0-926888-00-5.
- IronMind: Stronger Minds, Stronger Bodies (1994). ISBN 0-926888-02-1. A compilation of the first 60 "IronMind" columns from IRONMAN.
- Paul Anderson, The Mightiest Minister (1999). ISBN 0-926888-08-0.
- Captains of Crush Grippers: What They Are and How To Close Them, Second Edition. (2009). ISBN 978-0-926888-84-5.
- Winning Ways: How To Succeed In The Gym And Out (2004). ISBN 0-926888-13-7. A compilation of the final 85 "IronMind" columns from IRONMAN.
