= Grippers =

Devices to test and increase hand strength

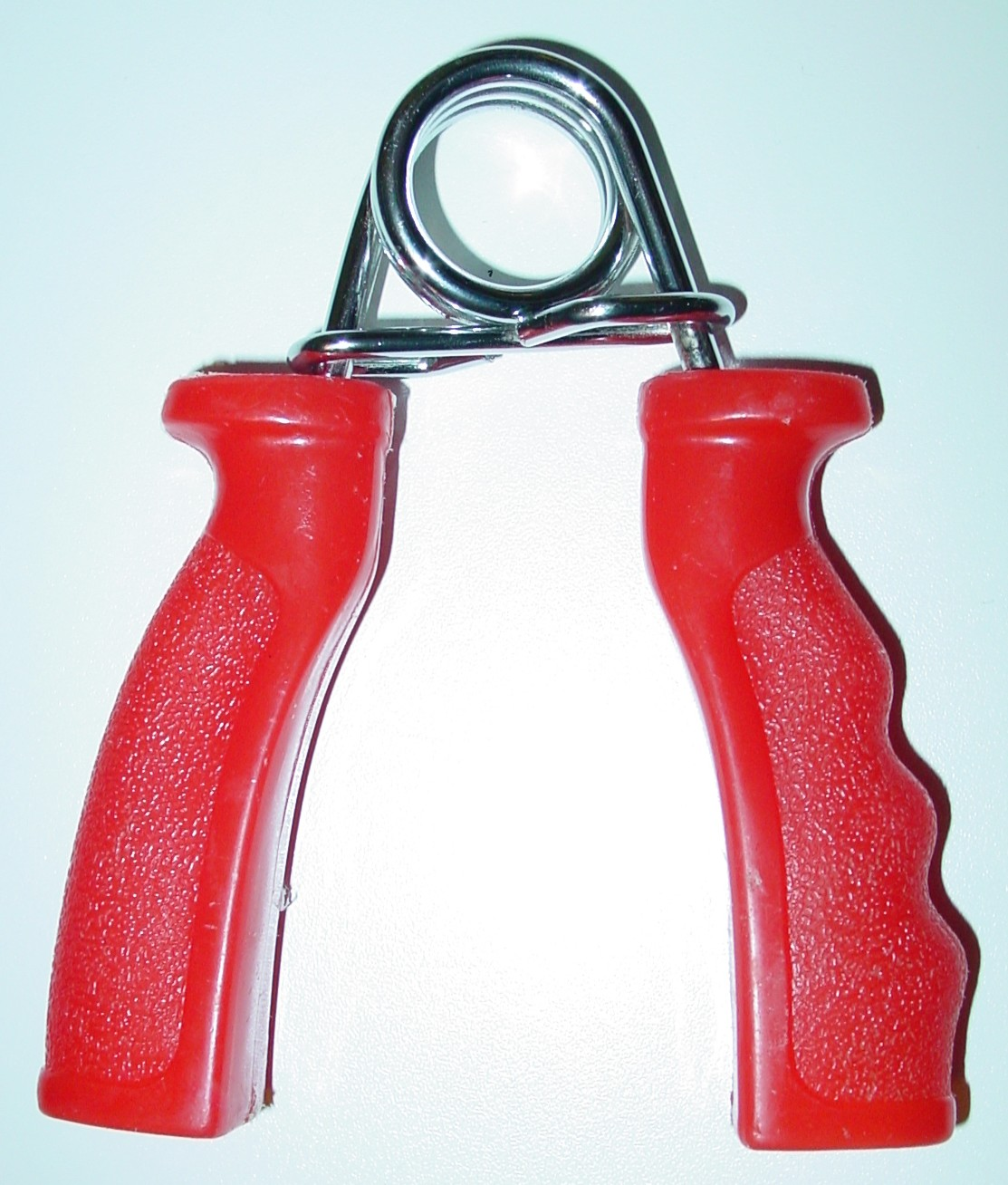
A mass market, plastic-handled gripper

Grippers, sometimes called hand grippers, are primarily used for testing and increasing the strength of the hands; this specific form of grip strength has been called crushing grip, which has been defined as meaning the prime movers are the four fingers, rather than the thumb.

There are differences from brand to brand, but the common feature of standard grippers is that they use a torsion spring fitted with two handles. The exact dimensions of these elements vary, as well as the materials used to make them; the springs are made from various types of steel, and the handles are generally made from wood, plastic, steel, or aluminum.

== History ==
Grippers from the early part of the 20th century to the middle of the 20th century typically had wooden handles, were quite easy for a strong person to close, and were a regularly advertised product in bodybuilding-weightlifting magazines. Top early 20th century professional strongman Thomas Inch had two challenge nutcracker grippers in the 1930s that defied nearly all who tried to close them, and besides their status as a specific challenge, the design and application of this gripper was praised as a sound way to assess grip strength. In 1964, Iron Man magazine introduced the "Iron Man Super Heavy Grip Developer," and unlike mass market grippers, these grippers had steel handles, thick springs and were very difficult to close. The popularity of these grippers was limited, and they were discontinued in 1977.

== Training ==
Historically, users trained with grippers by doing high repetitions, but it has been argued that while this was necessary in the days before more challenging grippers were available, this is an inefficient way to increase strength, and that lower repetitions are preferred, consistent with other strength-training protocols Joe Kinney, the first man certified for closing the Captains of Crush No. 4 gripper, is credited with introducing the idea of negatives to gripper training. The idea of starting a gripper from the "deep set" position (approximately 19 mm space in between the handles) originated from an ebook that was inspired by Kinney's success, but then focused on training principles and techniques developed by the author, not Kinney. Randall Strossen has argued that the generally accepted principles of effective strength training apply to grippers, just as they do to any other movement. Performing strongman John Brookfield developed strap holds, the idea of hanging a small weight from a strap or belt which is kept in place by squeezing the handles of a gripper hard enough to keep the weight from falling one of many training innovations he pioneered. Arm wrestlers were among the first to establish specific training protocols using grippers, as part of a larger strength training program for their sport.

== Ratings and accuracy ==
To explain the amount of variability to expect, grippers have been likened to uncalibrated barbell plates, which at its most basic level means that they will have greater variations than calibrated barbell plates (i.e., barbell plates that must conform to narrowly defined, pre-established standards), but there is evidence that substantial levels of accuracy are achievable for grippers.

Grippers are commonly rated in such units as pounds per square inch to inch-pounds to inches, but arguments have been presented that in many cases these numbers have little real meaning and in all cases they are not as transparent as the label (in pounds or kilos) on a barbell plate, so they should be viewed with caution. Similarly, "calibration" is sometimes misused, as when a gripper is rated, whether subjectively or objectively, Instead of made to conform to an external standard.

== Misconceptions ==
Along with misstatements about calibration, two other misconceptions about grippers were introduced in 2003. One of the notions was that the characteristics of the springs in grippers would change over the course of a certain number of repetitions before they stabilized, in a process that was labeled "seasoning."

An alternative view is that a spring will bend when the force required to close the gripper exceeds the spring's mechanical limits, but that such bending does not occur in grippers that are properly designed and built. Such bending would make the gripper easier to close on successive attempts, while the grippers with springs that did not bend would remain constant.

The arm of a torsion spring with the sharper bend was termed the "dogleg", and while noting that it would make no difference in the force required to close the gripper, it was stated that it took "less effort" to initially deflect the gripper if one pushed on the dogleg. Others have argued that grippers are symmetric with regard to forces applied to the handles and that the dogleg is another myth, and this has been demonstrated with an analysis of the underlying physics, but the concepts remain in use. Subjective reports and objective facts about grippers do not always match.

== Non-traditional grippers ==
Traditional grippers are used by the whole hand at once, although the thumb is stationary and the other four fingers apply the force required to close the gripper, but specialty grippers exist that allow the fingers to be trained one or two at a time. Traditional grippers have handles of fixed lengths, but at different times, grippers have been introduced that have variable-length handles, allowing the user to change the amount of leverage and the range of motion involved when closing the gripper.

== See also ==
- Grip strength
- How to Measure the Strength of a Gripper
