= IronMind =

American exercise equipment company

IronMind Enterprises, Inc.
- Type: Privately held corporation
- Industry: Iron sports
- Founded: 1988
- Headquarters: Nevada City, California,
- Products: Weight training equipment and accessories, hand grippers, books, apparel
- Website: www.ironmind.com

IronMind Enterprises, Inc. is an American niche market business based in Nevada City, California, that specializes in "tools of the trade for serious strength athletes." Though many of its products include strength-training equipment and accessories, IronMind also publishes books, DVDs and the quarterly magazine MILO: A Journal For Serious Strength Athletes.

IronMind sponsors competitions in weightlifting, arm wrestling, grip strength and strongman at events such as the Arnold Sports Festival, the GNC Grip Gauntlet, and North American Strongman.

== Psychology and strength sports ==
IronMind was founded in 1988 by Randall J. Strossen, a Stanford psychology PhD with a longstanding interest in weightlifting and related strength sports. That year also marked the beginning of Strossen's 12-year stint writing a monthly column for Iron Man magazine about the psychology of bodybuilding and weightlifting.

IronMind's slogan, "Stronger Minds, Stronger Bodies," reflects the company's roots in sports psychology. It is also the subtitle of Strossen's second book, a partial collection of his columns for Iron Man, published by IronMind in 1994.

== Products ==
Some of IronMind's notable products include the Captains of Crush Grippers, the Rolling Thunder, the Vulcan Racks system, and the book Super Squats: How to Gain 30 Pounds of Muscle in 6 Weeks.

IronMind has been a mail-order company since its inception and publishes an annual product catalog that also provides training tips, a history of strength sports, and information on subjects ranging from hand health to nutrition.

The company counts scores of major collegiate and professional sports teams among its customers. Its Vulcan Racks are in use at the U.S. Olympic Training Center in Colorado Springs, Colorado, and at the US Olympic Education Center at Northern Michigan University.

The World's Strongest Man (WSM) contest has used IronMind's Draft Horse Pulling Harness for its competitions since 2002. In 2006, IronMind manufactured a harness for the WSM's Car Walk event after consulting with two-time WSM winner Jouko Ahola on the design. It has been used at WSM competitions ever since.

Strength enthusiasts, people training at home and those with hand ailments such a carpal tunnel syndrome and arthritis make up the rest of IronMind's patrons.

== Focus on grip strength ==
Grip strength has been a major focus for IronMind since the company introduced its specialized line of grip-strength tools in 1990.

The idea that grip strength comprises three basic components – crushing, pinching and supporting elements (deadlifting, etc.) – was first presented to the world in the 1992 IronMind catalog. IronMind promoted and further developed this idea in later catalogs. It first published a chart in 1995 highlighting how grip strength applies to activities and professions ranging from law enforcement to powerlifting and playing music, and expanded on it in subsequent catalogs.

Two books written by grip-strength expert John Brookfield and published by IronMind – Mastery of Hand Strength, Revised Edition (2008) and The Grip Master's Manual (2002) – also expand upon these basic components of grip strength, which are now considered as widely accepted fact.

=== Captains of Crush Grippers ===
IronMind produces the Captains of Crush line of hand grippers. These grippers have been widely used in grip strength training and are frequently cited in strength sports literature. They have developed a dedicated following among strength training enthusiasts. One anecdotal report describes a British strength enthusiast who requested in his will to be buried with his Captains of Crush hand gripper.

In 1991, IronMind began certifying people able to close the company's benchmark Captains of Crush No. 3 gripper; certification on the Captains of Crush No. 4 was added in 1998 and certification on the Captains of Crush No. 3.5 was added in 2008.

Only five people (Joe Kinney, Nathan Holle, David Morton, Tommy Heslep and Magnus Samuelsson) have been certified for closing the No. 4.

== Publications ==
IronMind has published 18 books by established authors such as John McCallum, Ben Weider and David Webster. It has also developed and published books by such first-time authors as John Brookfield, Steve Jeck, Steve Justa, Brad Johnson and Brian Jones, many of whom have become authorities in their fields.

Randall J. Strossen's first book, Super Squats: How to Gain 30 Pounds of Muscle in 6 Weeks (1989), was also the first product offered by IronMind. It presents the classic 20-rep squat routine, a routine best known for helping people bulk up in a short period of time. The book is currently in its eighteenth printing (in English) and has been translated into German.

As a photographer and editor-in-chief for IronMind's quarterly journal MILO (launched in 1993), Strossen flies over 100,000 miles a year to cover strength-sport events around the world. MILO is the only American bodybuilding or weightlifting magazine to receive media accreditation to cover weightlifting at the 1996, 2000, 2004 and the 2008 Olympics.

== Arnold Sports Festival ==
IronMind has been involved as a sponsor or an organizer of the International Weightlifting Invitational, GNC Grip Gauntlet and Arm Wrestling events at the Arnold Sports Festival (also known as the Arnold Classic or just "the Arnold" and named after Arnold Schwarzenegger) for several years.

In 2005, IronMind worked with the event's co-founder, Jim Lorimer, to bring Shi Zhiyong and Zhang Guozheng – the two gold medalists from China's 2004 Olympic men's weightlifting team – to Columbus, Ohio, for the weightlifting exhibition at that year's festival.

The following year, IronMind continued to help internationalize the Arnold by bringing in three more 2004 Olympic medalists in weightlifting: George Asanidze (Republic of Georgia), Le Maosheng (China) and Velichko Cholakov (Bulgaria).
