= Grip strength =

Force applied by the hand to hold

Grip strength measurement in the beetle Bolitotherus cornutus

Grip strength is the force applied by the hand to pull on or suspend from objects and is a specific part of hand strength. Optimum-sized objects permit the hand to wrap around a cylindrical shape with a diameter from 1 inch (2.5 cm) to 3 inches (7.6 cm). Stair rails are an example of where shape and diameter are critical for proper grip in case of a fall. Another grip strength that has been studied is the grip used when using a hammer or other hand tools. In applications of grip strength, the wrist must be in a neutral position to avoid developing cumulative trauma disorders.

Grip strength is a general term also used to refer to the physical strength of an animal and, for athletes, to the muscular power and force that can be generated with the hands. In athletics, grip strength is critical for rock climbers and is an important factor in strongman competitions and weight lifting. Grip strength training is also a major feature in martial arts and can be useful in various professions where people must work with their hands.

== Types of grip ==
The human hand can be used to grip objects in several different positions. These different positions require different types of grip strength which are typically quantified based on the way the hand is being used.

The crush grip is what is most commonly thought of as "grip". It involves a handshake-type grip, where the object being gripped rests firmly against the palm and all fingers. A strong crush grip is useful in bone-crushing handshakes, or for breaking objects with pressure.

In a pinch grip, the fingers are on one side of an object, and the thumb is on the other. Typically, an object lifted in a pinch grip does not touch the palm. This is generally considered a weaker grip position. The pinch grip is used when grabbing something like a weight plate or lifting a sheet of plywood by the top edge.

A support grip typically involves holding something, such as the handle of a bucket, for a long time. This type of strength is epitomized by the Farmer's walk competitive event, where a bucket is filled with sand or water and carried over a long distance. A great deal of muscular endurance is necessary to have a good carrying grip.

=== Normative data ===
There has been extensive medical and ergonomic research looking at grip strength, which has found that 95% of men have a grip strength greater than 90% of women. Averages also exist for different types of grip in different positions. Grip strength increases or decreases depending on the arm position at which the grip strength is being measured. A person's grip strength usually results in having the strongest grip strength when their arm is extended at 90° before their body, as opposed to the other extreme arm positions, rested at one's side or held straight up above one's head. Grip strength is not optimal if one's arm is extended backwards beyond the resting position at the body's sides. It can be concluded that grip strength is affected via the different arm muscles and their ability to contract.

=== In medicine ===
Grip strength is often used in medicine as a specific type of hand strength. The purpose of this testing is diverse, including to diagnose diseases, to evaluate and compare treatments, to document progression of muscle strength, and to provide feedback during the rehabilitation process as a measure indicating the level of hand function. For example, it is used to indicate changes in hand strength after hand surgery or after a rehabilitation program. By asking subjects to maintain a maximum contraction for longer periods, it can be used as a measure of fatigue. It is also able to predict a decline in function in old age. The World Health Organization has identified Grip Strength as an indicator of vitality for aging populations. Since the above-mentioned grips involve the action of a large number of different joints and muscle groups, grip strength is not always very sensitive to measure individual muscle groups in medicine. For this purpose, dynamometers have been developed that provide more specific information on individual muscles in the hand such as the Rotterdam Intrinsic Hand Myometer (RIHM). In medicine, doctors sometimes use grip strength to test a patient's mentality, as grip strength directly correlates to mental state. Grip strength is also used to measure the degree of rehabilitation from injuries; all other things being equal, it will vary with general condition. Additionally, grip strength can be used to determine a patient's physical stability. Measuring this in intervals allows a doctor to determine if a patient is making progress or if different methods need to be used. There is a direct correlation between grip strength of older people and their overall body strength. This correlation helps doctors with treating the elderly a lot, because it allows doctors to see how well an elderly person is functioning. Relative handgrip strength, handgrip measure divided by body mass index (BMI), affects the future onset of diabetes and prediabetes. A stronger handgrip is linked with less diabetes cases. Strengthening the grip strength helps players recover from sport injuries such as tennis elbow.

=== Quantified measures of health status in older adults ===
As a measure of strength required for older adults to perform heavy tasks (such as carrying 11 kilograms (24 lb) objects), minimum grip strength for men was determined to be 28.5 kilograms (63 lb) and for women 18.5 kilograms (41 lb). Six studies correlating grip strength with the six minute walk test determined "slow" to vary between 23.2 kilograms (51 lb) to 39 kilograms (86 lb) for men, and 15.9 kilograms (35 lb) to 22 kilograms (49 lb) for women.

=== In sports ===
Hand grip is an important, though often overlooked, component of strength in sports. However, the grip strength is most often a secondary or auxiliary function of the sport. Sports in which grip strength are included within the secondary focus include the following: movement-based climbing, calisthenics, gymnastics, pole dancing, horse racing, powerlifting, strongman or arm wrestling; ball-based baseball, gridiron football, rugby, canoe polo, badminton or tennis; and combat sports such as wrestling, judo, brazilian jiu-jitsu, boxing or fencing. In sports, hand grip strength is a major factor in a player's strength, determining how easily a ball can be caught or how effectively equipment can be used. Hand grip strength is directly linked to hand-eye coordination: when a person is looking at the thing they are gripping, hand grip strength intensifies because of this synchronization.

Hand grip strength is very important when it comes to sports. Before a player begins playing a hand grip strength test is important for determining a player's workout. Hand grip strength determines a player's readiness for sports. In golf, hand grip strength is used to control the power a golfer hits a golf ball. The angle at which a golfer hits the ball determines how far the ball goes. ... In football, the quarterback uses hand grip strength to throw accurate passers to receivers. The receivers use hand grip strength to catch and maintain control of the football. ... In hockey, hand grip strength is used to angle the shot of the puck, whether they are passing the puck or shooting for a goal. Hand grip strength is essential for the execution of skills in hockey. In martial arts, hand grip strength is a key use in mastering techniques. Hand grip strength determines the success of arm functionality, such as speed and precision.

=== As a separate discipline ===
From their beginnings as odd performances at fairs and circuses, grip feats have recently gained acceptance as a sport in their own right, with competitions being held with increasing regularity. Events include one-arm deadlift (rolling thunder), nail bending, the closing of torsion spring hand grippers, v-bar (vertical bar) lifting, and standardized pinch apparatuses. Other common events may include thickbar deadlifts, little big horn (anvil lift), block, blob and hub lifting.

== Feats of strength ==
Although grip strength lends itself to impromptu performances that might feature a unique implement or cater to a particular individual or a small group, performances on standardized, widely available tests carry more weight. One such feat involving world class grip strength is officially closing a No. 3 Captains of Crush Gripper, first accomplished by Richard Sorin in 1991. Card tearing is a traditional feat of grip and lower arm strength that has a rich history. Below are some of the most well known measures of grip strength.

- Captains of Crush Grippers
- Rolling Thunder
- Apollon's Axle deadlift
- Little Big Horn
- Plate pinching
- Block, Blob, Hub
- Short Steel Bending

== Training methods ==
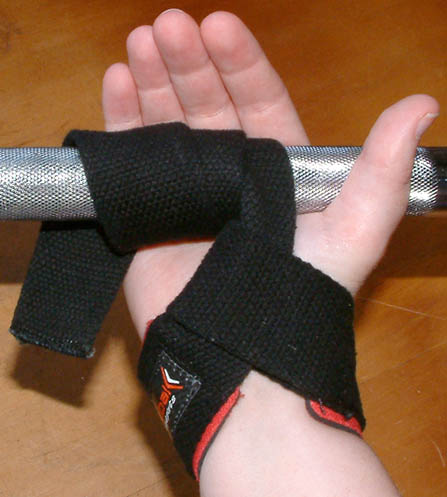
Wrist straps allow lifting heavier weights without having the grip strength that would be required otherwise.

Grip strength training requires a different type of training regimen than other muscular training. The reasons are primarily based on the interplay of the tendons and muscles and the lack of "down time" or rest that most people's hands get.

It is generally considered that all aspects of the hand must be exercised to produce a healthy and strong hand. Only working on closing grip will cause an imbalance between closing and opening (antagonist) muscles, and can lead to problems such as tendinitis and carpal tunnel syndrome.

=== For closing grip ===
- Thick bar and Thick Grip work on a two-inch or thicker bar—such as deadlifts, pullups, and the farmers walk—trains the support grip.
- Grippers train the crushing grip.
- Plate pinches — lifting a weight plate from the ground, standing upright on its edge, to your chest using a pinch grip between your fingers and thumbs only. The plate shouldn't touch the palm of your hand.
- Sledgehammer lever — levering a sledgehammer using the wrists to train fingers and wrists.
- Plate curls and wrist curls — grabbing a plate and doing wrist curls or regular curls with them with the fingers on the bottom and thumb on top, trains the wrists and fingers and thumb for pinch grip.
- Blockweights — cut off ends of hex dumbbells that are grasped in a pinch grip fashion from different sides of the blockweight with one end grasped by fingers and other by thumb; trained with either singles, timed holds, or tosses from hand to hand.
- Hangboard can be used for training the full-crimp grip, half-crimp grip and open hand grip, required in climbing.
- Short steel bending works the "closing grip" in a unique way. It combines a cylindrical gripping motion of the steel bar with the ulnar deviation of the wrist. This action is then forced into an isometric "hold" of sorts, as the bender attempts to bend the bar using only their two hands.

=== For opening grip ===
- Extensors; these are the muscles that oppose the flexors of the hands and should be trained to achieve a good balance between opposing muscle groups; extensor muscles are key in grip because they must contract aggressively to support finger flexion. Shoving your hand in something like rice and extending it, or placing something such as rocks in a coffee can, putting your hand in there, and extending it to pick up the coffee can, are ways of training your hand extensors.
- Some grip companies sell high-resistance rubber bands which work the extensor grip. Another option is a weight based machine; this type of plate loaded machine will not only strengthen your grip but also your forearm strength.
- As finger flexor/extensors serve a function as wrist flexor/extensors, doing wrist extension exercises (sometimes called "reverse wrist curls") would also stimulate the finger extensor fibers.
- Doing fist pushups on the backside of the first finger bone would increasingly put pressure on the extensor muscles as weight was shifted from knuckle-end to the further joint. When in a tight fist, the flat of the fingernails can dig into the palm and push the skin down to create a bridge to stabilize the first structure and prevent hyper flexion of the knuckle joints (which can be observed by doing pushups with the entire backside of the fingers flat on the ground, fingers pointing towards the opposite hand).

=== For stabilization ===
- Fingertip pushups would utilize both opening and closing grip muscles to keep the finger from sliding, as well as more focused bone density in the hand, though they are very strenuous and dangerous unless approached progressively.
- Handstands free from a wall with fingers pointing behind would use gripping stretching to stabilize the hand to prevent the body from falling towards the front, and extensor muscles to prevent the body from falling towards the back.
- Metal-rod exercises strengthen the grip indirectly but very effectively through strength training using a metal rod or pole.

== See also ==
- List of basic exercise topics
