= List of Continental Football League teams =

The Continental Football League was an American football league that operated in North America from 1965 through 1969. The league was primarily formed by minor-league teams that had played in the United and Atlantic Coast football leagues. In February 1968, the ContFL merged with the Professional Football League of America (PFLA), in order to expand into the midwestern United States. In 1969, the league expanded into Texas by absorbing the Texas Football League, which also brought the first (and, to date, only) team from Mexico to play in a professional American football league, the Mexico Golden Aztecs.

== Teams ==
- Akron Vulcans (1967)

The team, based in Akron, Ohio, played four games in the Continental Football League during the 1967 season, accruing a record of 1–3. Jerry Healey was the team's radio broadcaster. The Vulcans to this day are reviled in the Akron community due to the actions of the team's owner, Frank Hurn, who had established the franchise with Chicago mafia money, swindled many of the local businessmen and athletes who supported the team and would develop a track record of con-artistry long beyond his time in Akron. Doak Walker, Tobin Rote and Lou Rymkus, the team's coaches, ended up investing some of their own money to keep the team (which was losing $25,000 a week) afloat. Ned Endress also had involvement with the coaching staff. The team's logo was a stylized, elongated A above a V, a football with flames shooting out. Not dissimilar to that of the Tennessee Titans. Local radio station WHLO ran a 'water boy' contest for the Vulcans, with the winner receiving a sideline pass to the Rubber Bowl, as well as an autographed water bucket, emblazoned with that logo. The winner never got the bucket, though, as Hurn pulled up stakes after four games.

- Alabama Hawks (Huntsville, Alabama) (1968-1969)

The Alabama Hawks were members of the CFL during the league's last two years, 1968-1969. The team was in the Eastern Division of the Atlantic Conference. During the 1968 season, the team was also known as the Huntsville Hawks. The Hawks sent several notable players on to the NFL including Jeff Van Note, Chip Myers, and Glen Condren, in part because of an unofficial farm team affiliation with the Atlanta Falcons (the Falcons rookies and the Hawks actually played an interleague preseason game in 1969, which the Falcons won 55–0).

- Arkansas Diamonds (Little Rock) (1968-1969)

The Arkansas Diamonds began play in 1968 and folded in the CFL's last season, 1969

- Brooklyn Dodgers (1966)

The Brooklyn Dodgers, although under the general managership of the baseball Dodgers legend Jackie Robinson, failed to attract at the gates. The Dodgers affiliated with the Liberty Football Conference's Long Island Jets in 1966). The franchise became a league-operated "road club" early in the season and its remnants were sold to Frank Hurn (see "Akron Vulcans" above).

- Charleston (W.Va.) Rockets (1965-1968)

The Charleston Rockets won the 1965 league championship, defeating the Toronto Rifles by a score of 24-7. Charleston's Coy Bacon, 1966 ContFL All-Star end, went on to play for the NFL's Los Angeles Rams, San Diego Chargers, Cincinnati Bengals and Washington Redskins.

- The Chicago Owls were a professional American football team based in Chicago, Illinois. They were members of the Continental Football League (CFL) during the league's last two years (1968–1969). The club was owned by Marty O'Connor and coached by Don Branby. The Owls signed former Arlington High School and Northern Illinois University Huskies star George Bork as starting quarterback before their inaugural season in 1968, which featured six home games at Soldier Field. The Owl's tenancy on the lakefront preceded the NFL's Bears by three years.
- Dallas Rockets (1969)
- Eugene Bombers (1967)
- Fort Worth Braves (1969)
- Fort Wayne Warriors (1965)

Successors to the Indianapolis Warriors of the United Football League. Moved to Montreal in 1966.

- Hartford Charter Oaks (1965-1967)

Based at Dillon Stadium in Hartford, Connecticut, the Charter Oaks had among their players Mel Meeks, a power running back who had set a minor league rushing record (1460 yards in a season) in 1964 when in the Atlantic Coast Football League. His time with the Oaks was a relatively disappointing one, with only 512 yards in two seasons, but he remained in Hartford after the Charter Oaks disbanded, becoming a member of its replacement, the ACFL's Hartford Knights.

- Hawaii Warriors Honolulu / Portland Loggers (1969)

Midway through the 1969 season, the Hawaii franchise moved to Portland, Oregon

- Indianapolis Capitols (1968-1969)

The Indianapolis Capitols won the 1969 league championship, defeating the San Antonio Toros by a score of 44-28 in overtime. After the league disbanded, the team moved to the Atlantic Coast Football League but ultimately folded in 1971.

- Jersey Jays (Newark, N.J.) (1969)

After the league disbanded, the team moved to the Atlantic Coast Football League but ultimately folded in 1971.

- Long Beach Admirals (1967)
- Mexico Golden Aztecs (1969)

The first, and last to date, professional football team to be based in Mexico. The team was based in Monterrey.

- Michigan Arrows (Detroit) (1968)

Garo Yepremian, at the time the former placekicker for the Detroit Lions, served as placekicker for the first part of the season before leaving for the U.S. Army. He later found Super Bowl fame in the NFL as a member of the Miami Dolphins.

- Montreal Beavers (1966-1967)

Played at Verdun Municipal Stadium. Marvin Bass was the head coach.

- Norfolk Neptunes (1967-1969)

After the league disbanded, the team moved to the Atlantic Coast Football League but ultimately folded in 1971.

- Oklahoma City Plainsmen (1968)
- Oklahoma Thunderbirds (Bartlesville) (1969)
- Omaha Mustangs (1968-1969)
- Newark Bears (1965)
- Orange County Ramblers (Anaheim, California) (1967-1968)

The Ramblers are best known for their credited guest appearance in the 1968 film Skidoo, in which the team played the role of the Green Bay Packers— naked.

- Orlando Panthers (1966-1969)

The Orlando Panthers won the 1967 league championship, defeating the Orange County Ramblers by a score of 38-14. The Orlando Panthers won the 1968 league championship, defeating the Orange County Ramblers by a score of 30-23. Don Jonas, Orlando Panthers quarterback, was a dominant force in the ContFL for four seasons before joining the Winnipeg Blue Bombers of the Canadian Football League (CFL). Jonas led Orlando to the 1967 and 1968 ContFL championships, and was named the league's Most Valuable Player for each season. He also paced the Panthers to the 1966 championship game, which they lost to Philadelphia in overtime; and to the ContFL semifinal game in 1969. After the league disbanded, the team moved to the Atlantic Coast Football League but ultimately folded in 1971.

- Philadelphia Bulldogs (1965-1967)

The Philadelphia Bulldogs won the 1966 league championship, defeating the Orlando Panthers by a score of 20-17 in overtime. Successor to the "Canton Bulldogs," also known as the "Cleveland Bulldogs" (unrelated to the NFL teams of the same name) of the United Football League.

- Providence/Rhode Island Indians (1965)
- Quad Cities Raiders / Las Vegas Cowboys (1968-1969)

The Quad Cities franchise moved to Las Vegas midway through the 1968 season.

- Richmond (Va.) Rebels (1965-1967)
- Sacramento Buccaneers (1967)
- Sacramento Capitols (1968-1969)
- San Antonio Toros (1969)
- San Jose Apaches (1967)

The San Jose Apaches were coached by Bill Walsh, who later achieved great success as the three-time Super Bowl-winning coach of the NFL's San Francisco 49ers. Walsh served as head coach and general manager of the Apaches during the 1967 season, his first head coaching job at any level of professional football. He was 35 years old at the time and had previously worked as an assistant under Paul Brown with the Cincinnati Bengals. The Apaches played their home games at Spartan Stadium. Walsh's season with the Apaches lasted only one year before the franchise folded, but he later credited the experience with teaching him lessons about team organization and management that he applied throughout his NFL career.

- Seattle Rangers (1967-1969)
- Spokane Shockers (1968-1969)

The Spokane Shockers started the 1968 season with a young quarterback named Ken Stabler, who later achieved great success with the Oakland Raiders of the NFL.

- Springfield (Mass.) Acorns / Norfolk Neptunes (1965-1966)

Before the season began, the Springfield, Massachusetts, franchise moved to Norfolk, Virginia. The Norfolk club went on to become the most successful team in the league at the box office and held several minor league attendance records throughout the 1960s and 1970s.

- Texarkana Titans (1969)
- Toronto Rifles (1965-1967)

Successor to the Quebec Rifles of the United Football League. First Canadian-based professional team to play by American football rules.

- Tri-City Apollos (Midland, Mich.) (1969)
- Victoria Steelers (1967)

One of three Continental Football League teams to be based in Canada (Victoria, British Columbia), the Steelers are the only professional football team in Victoria's history. Originally in the Pacific Football League in 1966.

- West Texas Rufneks (Odessa-Midland) (1969)
- Wheeling Ironmen (1965-1967) / Ohio Valley Ironmen (Wheeling, W.Va.) (1968-1969)
