= 1965 Continental Football League season =

- Duration: August 14 – November 14, 1965
- Date: November 28, 1965
- Finals venue: Laidley Field, Charleston, WV
- Finals champions: Charleston Rockets

Seasons
- ← n/a 1966 →

The 1965 COFL season was the first season of the Continental Football League (COFL). The COFL entered its inaugural season with franchises in Philadelphia, Springfield, Massachusetts, Newark, New Jersey, Toronto, Wheeling, West Virginia, Richmond, Virginia, Charleston, West Virginia, Hartford, Connecticut, Providence, Rhode Island, and Fort Wayne, Indiana.

== Franchise changes ==
In April 1965 the Springfield franchise was purchased by a group from Norfolk, Virginia. The sale was approved and finalized in May.

== General news ==
- Happy Chandler was appointed commissioner in March 1965, with a five-year contract worth $50,000 per year.

== Rules different from NFL ==
- Games tied after four quarters move to a sudden death period.
- On kickoffs, if the ball goes beyond the end zone the kicking team is given a five-yard penalty and must kick again until the ball is handled.
- Fair catches are not allowed.
- If the receiving team on a kickoff attempts to run the ball out of the end zone and does not reach the 20-yard-line, the ball is automatically placed at the 20.

== Regular season ==
W = Wins, L = Losses, T = Ties, PCT= Winning Percentage, PF= Points For, PA = Points Against

y = Division Champion

Eastern Division
Team	W	L	T	PCT	PF	PA	Stadium	Coach
y-Toronto Rifles	11	3	0	.786	412	258	Maple Leaf Stadium	Leo Cahill
Philadelphia Bulldogs	10	4	0	.717	414	341	Temple Stadium	Babe Dimancheff
Norfolk Neptunes	9	5	0	.643	326	280	Foreman Field	Gary Glick
Newark Bears	5	9	0	.357	307	310	Newark Schools Stadium	Steve Van Buren
Wheeling Ironmen	2	12	0	.143	175	290	Wheeling Island Stadium	Mac Cara/Bob Snyder
Western Division
Team	W	L	T	PCT	PF	PA	Stadium	Coach
y-Charleston Rockets	14	0	0	1.000	462	129	Laidley Field	Perry Moss
Fort Wayne Warriors	8	6	0	.538	351	256	Zollner Stadium	Ken Carpenter
Richmond Rebels	6	8	0	.429	283	385	City Stadium	Pete Pihos
Rhode Island Indians	3	11	0	.214	182	411	City Stadium	Mike Connolly
Hartford Charter Oaks	2	12	0	.143	203	455	Dillon Stadium	Fred Wallner/Lee Grosscup/Lowell Lander

== Playoffs ==
Home team in CAPITALS

League Championship (November 28, 1965)

- CHARLESTON 24, Toronto 7

== Awards ==
- Most Valuable Player: Bob Brodhead (QB, Philadelphia Bulldogs) & Joe Williams (FB, Toronto Rifles)
- Coach of the Year: Perry Ross, Charleston
