= Tom Bland =

American gridiron football player (1937–2021)

Profile
- Position: Wide receiver

Personal information
- Born: July 2, 1937; Wheeling, West Virginia
- Died: March 8, 2021 (aged 83)
- Listed height: 5 ft 11 in (1.80 m)
- Listed weight: 170 lb (77 kg)

Career information
- High school: Wheeling High School
- College: West Liberty

Career history

Playing
- 1962–1964: Wheeling Ironmen
- 1965: Fort Wayne Warriors
- 1966–1969: Orlando Panthers
- 1970: Toronto Argonauts

Coaching
- 1979–1980: UCF (OA)
- 1991–1992: Orlando Predators (WR)

Awards and highlights
- All-UFL (1963); All-COFL (1969)

Career statistics
- Receptions: 29
- Receiving yards: 480
- Receiving touchdowns: 5

Thomas Robert Bland Sr. (July 2, 1937 – March 8, 2021) was an American football wide receiver who played in the Canadian Football League and several minor leagues.

== College career ==
Bland played both basketball and football at West Liberty College. He was inducted into West Liberty's Athletic Hall of Fame in 1992.

== Professional career ==
After graduating from West Liberty, Bland joined the Wheeling Ironmen of the United Football League. In 1963 he was named All-UFL after catching 55 passes for 1,149 yards and 11 touchdowns. Bland was signed away from Wheeling in 1965 by the Fort Wayne Warriors of the Continental Football League, which was founded after the UFL folded. After one year in Fort Wayne he joined the Orlando Panthers. Bland was the Continental League's all-time leading receiver with 5,418 yards and 60 touchdown receptions. In eight minor league seasons Bland had 455 receptions for 8,563 yards and 90 touchdowns. Bland was inducted into the Minor League Football Hall of Fame in 1982.

In 1970 he was signed by the Toronto Argonauts along with Orlando quarterback Don Jonas. In his only CFL season, Bland caught 29 passes for 480 yards with 5 touchdowns.

== Post-playing career ==
After his playing career ended, Bland returned to Florida and became a high school teacher and football coach. In 1979, he was hired as a member of his former teammate Don Jonas's coaching staff for the newly formed football program for the University of Central Florida and was an offensive assistant coach for the team's first two seasons. Bland worked as the assistant director of football operations for the Tampa Bay Bandits and later was the player personnel director of the Orlando Renegades of the United States Football League. Bland became a collections agent after the USFL folded. He later served as the receivers coach for the Orlando Predators of the Arena Football League in their inaugural season in 1991 before leaving the team after the 1992 season.

Bland died on March 8, 2021.
