= Marshall Starks =

American football player (1939–2016)

No. 25, 32, 27, 34, 16
- Position: Cornerback

Personal information
- Born: March 6, 1939
- Died: July 31, 2016 (aged 77)
- Listed height: 6 ft 0 in (1.83 m)
- Listed weight: 195 lb (88 kg)

Career information
- High school: Rockford West (Rockford, Illinois)
- College: Illinois
- NFL draft: 1961: 8th round, 106th overall pick

Career history
- New York Jets (1963-1964); Newark Bears (1965); Edmonton Eskimos (1966); Toronto Rifles (1967); Orlando Panthers (1967); Montreal Beavers (1967)

Career AFL statistics
- Interceptions: 1
- Kick/Punt return yards: 562
- Total touchdowns: 1
- Stats at Pro Football Reference

Marshall L. Starks (March 6, 1939 – July 31, 2016) was an American professional football defensive back who played cornerback for two seasons for the New York Jets of the American Football League (AFL).

Starks died on July 31, 2016, at the age of 77.

== See also ==
- List of NCAA major college yearly punt and kickoff return leaders
