= Mike Hibler =

American football player (born 1946)

No. 56, 55, 50
- Position: Linebacker

Personal information
- Born: January 29, 1946 (age 80); Mountain View, California, U.S.
- Listed height: 6 ft 1 in (1.85 m)
- Listed weight: 235 lb (107 kg)

Career information
- High school: Saint Francis (Mountain View, California)
- College: Stanford (1963–1966)
- NFL draft: 1967: 5th round, 131st overall pick

Career history
- Oakland Raiders (1967); Cincinnati Bengals (1968); Sacramento Capitols (1969); Orlando Panthers (1970)

Awards and highlights
- First-team All-PCC (1965)
- Stats at Pro Football Reference

Michael Keith Hibler (born January 29, 1946) is an American former professional football linebacker who played one season with the Cincinnati Bengals of the American Football League (AFL). He was selected by the Oakland Raiders in the fifth round of the 1967 NFL/AFL draft after playing college football at Stanford University.

== Early life and college ==
Michael Keith Hibler was born on January 29, 1946, in Mountain View, California. He attended Saint Francis High School in Mountain View.

Hibler played college football for the Stanford Cardinal of Stanford University. He was on the freshman team in 1963 and was a three-year letterman from 1964 to 1966. He was named first-team All-PCC by both the Coaches and the Associated Press in 1965. Hibler also played college rugby while at Stanford.

== Professional career ==
Hibler was selected by the Oakland Raiders of the American Football League (AFL) in the fifth round, with the 131st overall pick, of the 1967 NFL/AFL draft. He spent the 1967 season on injured reserve and did not appear in any games. He became a free agent after the season.

Hibler signed with the Cincinnati Bengals of the AFL in 1968. He played in 11 games, starting three, for the Bengals during the team's inaugural 1968 season. He was released in 1969.

He played for the Sacramento Capitols of the Continental Football League in 1969, intercepting two passes for 11 yards while also returning one kickoff for 24 yards.

Hibler was a member of the Orlando Panthers of the Atlantic Coast Football League in 1970.
