= Brooklyn Dodgers (Continental Football League) =

Football team in the US

The Brooklyn Dodgers were a football team that played one season in the minor Continental Football League in 1966. They were not related to the former National Football League or All-America Football Conference clubs of that name.

== Origins ==
The franchise was originally known as the Providence Indians (aka Rhode Island Indians), a newly-formed team in the Continental League's first season in 1965. The COFL's other nine squads were taken from the Atlantic Coast Football League and the defunct United Football League; the Indians replaced an incarnation of the Providence Steam Roller that had played in the ACFL from 1962 to 1964. After a disastrous 3-11 season played before tiny crowds, the franchise was shifted to Brooklyn and renamed after the famous baseball team. (There was precedent for this: there was a Brooklyn Dodgers team in the NFL from 1930–43 and another club of that name in the All-America Football Conference (AAFC) from 1946–48; still, the Los Angeles Dodgers were not amused, suing the new Dodgers for copyright infringement for using their former name.)

Although a completely different organization from the baseball Dodgers (who by this point had moved to Los Angeles), the football Dodgers did hire hardball legend Jackie Robinson as their general manager, featuring him in their promotional materials. Robinson, who briefly played professional football in the old Pacific Coast League in the 1940s, was actually hired as a figurehead with little say over the day-to-day actions of the team; his role was mostly limited to public appearances, such as attending "Jackie Robinson Day" when the Dodgers played in Montreal, where he had played for the minor-league Montreal Royals in 1946. Andy Robustelli was the Dodgers' head coach, while Tom Kennedy, who also played with the club when it was in Providence in 1965, was the starting quarterback. After Kennedy led the Continental in passing (191-for-316, 2559 yards and 18 TDs), he was signed by the New York Giants; afterwards, ex-TCU star Sonny Gibbs took over behind center.

== 1966 season ==
Actually finding a place to play in Brooklyn proved to be a challenge, as Ebbets Field had been demolished in 1960. An attempt to use Shea Stadium also failed, as the AFL New York Jets were not interested in sharing the facility; the Dodgers then brought suit to abrogate the Jets' "exclusive rights" to play at Shea. Finally, the club signed a deal to play their home games at Downing Stadium on Randall's Island—quite a distance from Brooklyn. (Ironically, the football Dodgers wound up playing under the Ebbets Fields lights anyway; they had been moved to Downing after the older stadium was torn down.)

Even at Downing, the Dodgers apparently had trouble securing dates; a season-ticket application showed only five home games in a fourteen-game schedule. In any event, small crowds (only 30,702 combined for four games, including 12,000 for an exhibition contest) caused the franchise to become a league-operated "road club" in October; one home game against Hartford was moved to Connecticut, and their final "home" contest was shifted to Memorial Stadium in Mount Vernon, New York. The football Dodgers finished with a 5-9 record, last place in the five-team Eastern Division. Flanker Bob Reed and defensive tackle Dick Herzig earned all-league honours.

Several COFL teams established farm team relationships with semi-pro clubs in 1966; the Dodgers affiliated with the Liberty Football Conference's Long Island Jets.

== Schedule ==
Week	Date	Opponent	Result
1	August 20, 1966	at Charleston Rockets	L 23-42
2	August 27, 1966	Orlando Panthers (attendance 8,801)	L 7-49
3	September 3, 1966	at Hartford Charter Oaks	L 14-24
4	September 10, 1966	at Montreal Beavers	L 14-22
5	September 18, 1966	at Wheeling Ironmen	W 45-27
6	September 24, 1966	Philadelphia Bulldogs (attendance 4,519)	W 43-14
7	October 1, 1966	at Orlando Panthers	L 16-31
8	October 8, 1966	at Norfolk Neptunes	W 24-17
9	October 15, 1966	at Toronto Rifles	L 13-21
10	October 22, 1966	Richmond Rebels (attendance 5,382)	L 20-21
11	October 29, 1966	at Philadelphia Bulldogs	L 14-37
12	November 5, 1966	at Hartford Charter Oaks (moved to Hartford)	W 20–6
13	November 13, 1966	at Norfolk Neptunes	L 24-31
14	November 19, 1966	Toronto Rifles (moved to Mt. Vernon, NY)	W 19-17

== Transfer to Akron ==
The remnants of the football Dodgers were sold to Frank Hurn, who moved the team to Akron, Ohio as the Akron Vulcans. Hurn used Chicago Outfit funding to buy the team and swindled numerous businessmen into providing lavish benefits for his team for which he would never pay. Despite decent gates (including 14,753 at the Rubber Bowl for an exhibition game), the team lost $100,000 after just three weeks of play, forcing his big-budget head coaches, Doak Walker and Lou Rymkus, to front their own money to keep the team afloat. Hurn never paid the players for their services, and the Wheeling Ironmen ended up paying the Vulcans' salaries for what would be the Vulcans' fourth and final game in order to avoid a strike. Hurn would later amass a long track record of criminal activity after his time in Akron.

Week	Date	Opponent	Result
1	August 26, 1967	Toronto Rifles (attendance 6,892)	L 7-22
2	September 3, 1967	Montreal Beavers (attendance 8,550)	W 14-7
3	September 9, 1967	at Hartford Charter Oaks	L 17-27
4	September 17, 1967	at Wheeling Ironmen	L 21-28
