= Monte Kiffin =

American football coach (1940–2024)

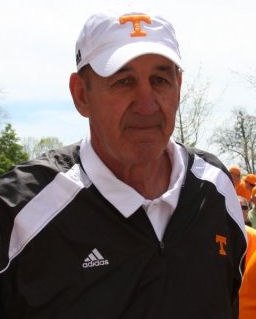
- Kiffin in 2009

Personal information
- Born: February 29, 1940; Lexington, Nebraska, U.S.
- Died: July 11, 2024 (aged 84); Oxford, Mississippi, U.S.

Career information
- High school: Lexington (NE)
- College: Nebraska (1958–1963)
- NFL draft: 1964: 15th round, 202nd overall pick

Career history

Playing
- Minnesota Vikings (1964)*; Winnipeg Blue Bombers (1965); Toronto Rifles (1966); Brooklyn Dodgers (1966)
- * Offseason or practice squad member only

Coaching
- Nebraska (1966–1968) Graduate assistant; Nebraska (1969–1976) Defensive coordinator; Arkansas (1977–1978) Defensive coordinator; Arkansas (1979) Assistant head coach & defensive coordinator; North Carolina State (1980–1982) Head coach; Green Bay Packers (1983) Linebackers coach; Buffalo Bills (1984–1985) Linebackers coach; Minnesota Vikings (1986–1989) Linebackers coach; New York Jets (1990) Linebackers coach; Minnesota Vikings (1991) Defensive coordinator; Minnesota Vikings (1992–1994) Linebackers coach; New Orleans Saints (1995) Defensive coordinator; Tampa Bay Buccaneers (1996–2008) Defensive coordinator; Tennessee (2009) Defensive coordinator; USC (2010–2012) Assistant head coach; Dallas Cowboys (2013) Defensive coordinator; Dallas Cowboys (2014) Assistant head coach for defense; Jacksonville Jaguars (2016) Defensive assistant; Florida Atlantic (2017–2019) Defensive assistant; Ole Miss (2020–2023) Player personnel analyst

Awards and highlights
- Super Bowl champion (XXXVII); Tampa Bay Buccaneers Ring of Honor; 2× College football national champion (1970, 1971)

Head coaching record
- Regular season: NCAA: 16–17 (.485)
- Coaching profile at Pro Football Reference

Monte George Kiffin (February 29, 1940 – July 11, 2024) was an American football coach. He is widely considered to have been one of the preeminent defensive coordinators in modern football, as well as one of the greatest defensive coordinators in NFL history. Father of the widely imitated "Tampa 2" defense, Kiffin's concepts are among the most influential in modern college and pro football.

He spent nearly 30 years as an NFL assistant coach, including 13 years as defensive coordinator for the Tampa Bay Buccaneers, with whom he won Super Bowl XXXVII. His defensive units finished ranked in the top 10 in points allowed and yards allowed 10 times during that period, an NFL record. Later in his career, he worked with his son Lane, who has served as the head coach of several major college programs.

Kiffin earned a reported $2 million annual salary during his time with Buccaneers and turned down several NFL head coaching jobs during his career. His only head coaching job was with the NC State Wolfpack from 1980 to 1982.

== Career ==
A native of Lexington, Nebraska, Kiffin was an offensive and defensive tackle at the University of Nebraska–Lincoln from 1959 to 1963. In 1966, he played 8 games with the Toronto Rifles of the Continental Football League and also was a member of the Brooklyn Dodgers of the same league. After a brief stint as a defensive end for the Winnipeg Blue Bombers, Kiffin returned to Nebraska as a defensive coach. Kiffin was the defensive coordinator at Nebraska under legendary coach, Bob Devaney. He coached the defenses of Nebraska's 1970 and 1971 back-to-back undefeated national champion teams. After then offensive coordinator Tom Osborne was selected as the head coach in 1973, Kiffin remained as the defensive coordinator. In 1977, he moved to the University of Arkansas, and then in 1980, he got his one and only head coaching job at North Carolina State University. In three seasons as head coach, he went 16–17.

After his time at NC State, Kiffin began a series of short stints in the NFL for the Green Bay Packers, Buffalo Bills, Minnesota Vikings (twice), New York Jets, and New Orleans Saints. In 1996, he became the defensive coordinator for the Buccaneers.

After Tony Dungy was dismissed by the Buccaneer front office following the 2001 season, Kiffin was persuaded by incoming head coach Jon Gruden to remain in Tampa and continue to run his defense. Kiffin had been interviewed for a head coaching position with the San Francisco 49ers. With the seamless transition on defense allowing the new coaching staff to focus intently on a more potent offensive philosophy, the result was an immediate balance between offense and defense that carried the Buccaneers to the organization's first championship in Super Bowl XXXVII on January 26, 2003, in San Diego, California.

Controversy surrounded Kiffin's departure from Tampa Bay. After Lane Kiffin became Tennessee's head coach, Tampa's typically stout defense underperformed. The Bucs lost their final four games of the 2008 season, ending up 9–7, and missed the playoffs. Reports stated that Gruden refused to allow Kiffin to announce his departure to Tennessee mid-season. Allegations were made that Kiffin refused to participate in normal coaching meetings. Neither Kiffin nor Gruden openly discussed these events.

Kiffin spent one season as Tennessee's defensive coordinator under Lane. Monte then followed his son to the University of Southern California coaching staff.

On January 11, 2013, following the 2012 NFL season, Kiffin was hired as defensive coordinator for the Dallas Cowboys. Kiffin was demoted on January 28, 2014, in favor of defensive line coach Rod Marinelli. At the end of the 2014 season Kiffin's contract was allowed to lapse, and it was not renewed by the Cowboys.

Kiffin joined the Jacksonville Jaguars as a defensive assistant in March 2016. He joined Lane at Florida Atlantic for three seasons as a defensive assistant from 2017–2019. When Lane went to Ole Miss, he joined as a player personnel analyst for four seasons.

== Defensive philosophy ==
Monte Kiffin is the mastermind behind the Tampa 2 scheme, which is a slight modification of the Cover 2 scheme.

== Personal life ==
Kiffin was married and had three children. His sons are both football coaches. His older son, Lane, played football at Fresno State before entering coaching. He was the head coach of the Oakland Raiders, Tennessee Volunteers, USC Trojans, and Florida Atlantic Owls, the offensive coordinator and quarterbacks coach for the Alabama Crimson Tide, the head coach of the Mississippi Rebels, and currently is the head coach of the LSU Tigers. Monte Kiffin's younger son, Chris, played football at Colorado State and is the co-defensive coordinator and linebackers coach for LSU.

Kiffin died in Oxford, Mississippi on July 11, 2024, at the age of 84.

== Head coaching record ==
Year	Team	Overall	Conference	Standing	Bowl/playoffs
NC State Wolfpack (Atlantic Coast Conference) (1980–1982)
1980	NC State	6–5	3–3	3rd	
1981	NC State	4–7	2–4	5th	
1982	NC State	6–5	3–3	T–3rd	
NC State:		16–17	8–10		
Total:		16–17			
