= Coy Bacon =

American football player (1942–2008)

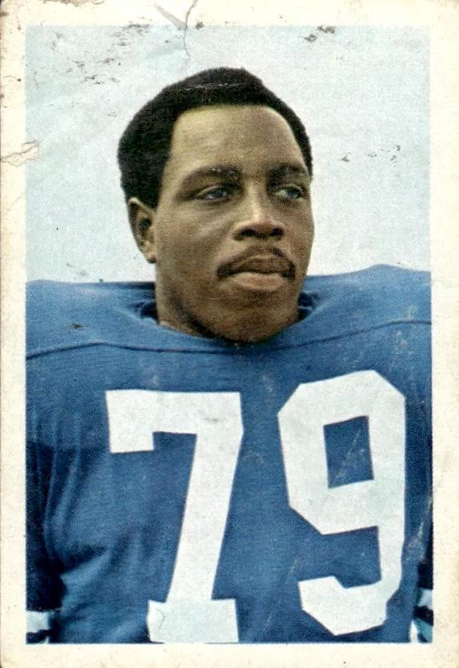
- Bacon in 1971

No. 76, 79, 80
- Position: Defensive lineman

Personal information
- Born: August 30, 1942; Cadiz, Kentucky, U.S.
- Died: December 22, 2008 (aged 66); Ironton, Ohio, U.S.
- Listed height: 6 ft 4 in (1.93 m)
- Listed weight: 270 lb (122 kg)

Career information
- High school: Ironton
- College: Jackson State
- NFL draft: 1967: undrafted

Career history
- Charleston Rockets (1965–1966); Dallas Cowboys (1967)*; Los Angeles Rams (1968–1972); San Diego Chargers (1973–1975); Cincinnati Bengals (1976–1977); Washington Redskins (1978–1981); Washington Federals (1983)
- * Offseason or practice squad member only

Awards and highlights
- 3× Second-team All-Pro (1971, 1972, 1976); 3× Pro Bowl (1972, 1976, 1977); NFL sacks leader (1976); COFL All-Star (1966); Cincinnati Bengals 50th Anniversary Team

Career NFL statistics
- Fumble recoveries: 15
- Interceptions: 2
- Touchdowns: 2
- Sacks: 130.5
- Stats at Pro Football Reference

Lander McCoy Bacon (August 30, 1942 – December 22, 2008) was an American professional football player who was a defensive lineman in the National Football League (NFL) for the Dallas Cowboys, Los Angeles Rams, San Diego Chargers, Cincinnati Bengals, and Washington Redskins. He also was a member of the Washington Federals in the United States Football League (USFL). He was selected to three Pro Bowls during his 14-year career. While sacks were not an official statistic during his career, researchers credit Bacon with a career total of 130.5. He played college football for the Jackson State Tigers.

== Early life ==
Bacon attended Ironton High School, where he competed in football and basketball. He accepted a football scholarship from Jackson State University. He played at linebacker and defensive end. He left school after his junior season before graduating.

In 1986, he was inducted into the American Football Association's Semi Pro Football Hall of Fame. In 2013, he was inducted into the Kentucky Pro Football Hall of Fame. In 2021, he was inducted into the Black College Football Hall of Fame.

== Professional career ==
In 1964, he tried out with the Houston Oilers of the American Football League, but was not signed as it was discovered that he had not graduated from Jackson State. In 1965, he signed with the semi-professional football team Charleston Rockets of the Continental Football League. In 1966, he received All-Star honors.

On February 20, 1967, he signed as an undrafted free agent with the Dallas Cowboys. He spent the season on the taxi squad.

On July 31, 1968, he was traded to the Los Angeles Rams in exchange for a fifth round draft choice (#125-Chuck Kyle). He appeared in 7 games as a backup after spending the first half of the season on the taxi squad. In 1969, he was promoted to the starting lineup after defensive tackle Roger Brown suffered an injury, teaming with the Fearsome Foursome line of Deacon Jones, Merlin Olsen, Roger Brown and Lamar Lundy.

In 1970, following Lundy's retirement, he was named the starter at right defensive end. In 1971, he had 11 sacks and was named second-team All-Pro. In 1972, he repeated as second-team All-Pro. Bacon was voted by the Rams Alumni Organization as the Rams defensive lineman of the year in 1971 and 1972.

On January 25, 1973, Bacon was sent to the San Diego Chargers along with running back Bob Thomas for quarterback John Hadl. He had an 80-yard interception return for a touchdown that year.

On January 25, 1976, he was traded from the Chargers to the Bengals for wide receiver Charlie Joiner. Bacon then had an NFL-high 21 1/2 sacks prior to the league officially recognizing individual sacks. He made the Pro Bowl and was a second-team All-Pro selection.

On June 26 1978, he was traded along with defensive back Lemar Parrish to the Washington Redskins in exchange for a first-round draft pick (#12-Charles Alexander). In 1979, he set a team record with 13.5 sacks. In 1980, he tallied 11 sacks.

He finished his career in the USFL with the Washington Federals in 1983, starting 16 of 18 games, while posting 62 tackles, 6 1/2 sacks and one fumble recovery, on a 3–15 club. On September 6, 1983, he was left unprotected and was selected in the 17th round of the expansion draft by the Jacksonville Bulls of the United States Football League.

== Personal life ==
Bacon eventually moved to Ironton, Ohio. He was wounded in a drug-related shooting in Washington, D.C., on August 16, 1986, and later became a born-again Christian and traveled as a motivational speaker. Coy also spent several years working with troubled youth at the Ohio River Valley Juvenile Correctional Facility.

He died in Ironton, Ohio, on December 22, 2008, at age 66. At his memorial service, Bacon was remembered as a religious man who had helped many people.
