= Dave Mathieson =

Profile
- Position: Quarterback

Personal information
- Born: April 20, 1941 (age 85); Los Angeles, California, U.S.
- Listed height: 6 ft 0 in (1.83 m)
- Listed weight: 199 lb (90 kg)

Career information
- High school: Reseda (CA)
- College: Washington State (1961–1963)
- NFL draft: 1964: 6th round, 81st overall pick
- AFL draft: 1964: 22nd round, 173rd overall pick

Career history
- Denver Broncos (1964)*; Wheeling Ironmen (1964–1965); Scranton Miners (1966); BC Lions (1967); Orange County Ramblers (1967)
- * Offseason or practice squad member only

David Michael Mathieson (born April 20, 1941) is a former American football quarterback.

Mathieson was born in 1941 in Los Angeles and attended Reseda High School.

Mathieson played college football for the Washington State Cougars from 1961 to 1963. In 1961 and 1962, he teamed up with wide receiver Hugh Campbell to form the top passing combination in college football. In 1962, he ranked among the leading quarterbacks in major-college football with 7.5 passing yards per attempt (4th), 1,492 passing yards (5th), 149.2 yards gained per game played (5th), 12 passing touchdowns (6th), a 127.1 passing efficiency rating (6th), 14.3 passing yards per completion (6th), 104 pass completions (7th), 199 pass attempts (7th). In the 1962 Apple Cup, he set school records completing 21 of 33 passes for 363 yards and three touchdowns.

Mathieson was drafted in the sixth round of the 1964 NFL draft (81st overall) by the Chicago Bears and in the 22nd round (173 overall) of the 1964 AFL draft by the Denver Broncos. He signed with the Bears but was released in August 1964. He played for the Wheeling Ironmen of the UFL/COFL in 1964 and 1965, the Scranton Miners of the ACFL in 1966, the British Columbia Lions of the Canadian Football League and the Orange County Ramblers of the COFL in 1967.
