= John Frantz =

American football player (born 1945)

No. 51, 65
- Position: Center

Personal information
- Born: July 1, 1945 (age 81); Kokomo, Indiana, U.S.
- Listed height: 6 ft 3 in (1.91 m)
- Listed weight: 230 lb (104 kg)

Career information
- High school: Nevada Union (Grass Valley, California)
- College: California (1964-1967)
- NFL draft: 1968: 16th round, 415th overall pick

Career history
- Buffalo Bills (1968); Orange County Ramblers (1968)

Career AFL statistics
- Games played: 2
- Stats at Pro Football Reference

John Edward Frantz (born July 1, 1945) is an American former professional football player who was a center for one season with the Buffalo Bills of the American Football League (AFL). He also played for the Orange County Ramblers. He played college football for the California Golden Bears.

Frantz was born on July 1, 1945, in Kokomo, Indiana. He went to Nevada Union High School and the University of California, Berkeley, for college. He was selected in the 16th round (415th overall) by the Buffalo Bills in the 1968 NFL/AFL draft. He only made two appearances with them. Frantz then played with the Orange County Ramblers of the Continental Football League (COFL). He wore number 51 with the Bills and 65 with the Ramblers.
