= Jersey Jays =

Defunct American football team

- Founded: 1969
- Folded: 1971
- League: Continental Football League, Atlantic Coast Football League
- Based in: Jersey City, New Jersey
- Arena: Roosevelt Stadium
- Colors
- Championships: 0

The Jersey Jays were a professional American football minor league team based in Jersey City, New Jersey. They began play in 1969 as a member of the Continental Football League, and were a farm team of the NFL's Cleveland Browns. The Jays played their home games in Newark Schools Stadium in 1969.

== History ==
The Jays were the second team in the COFL to play in Newark. The Newark Bears were a charter member of the league when it debuted in 1965 before it relocated to become the Orlando Panthers in 1966. The Jays were established to take the place of the Charleston Rockets, who left the league following the 1968 season.

The Jays moved to the Atlantic Coast Football League in the 1969-70 offseason, just before the COFL folded. That season the team also moved to nearby Roosevelt Stadium in Jersey City. The Jays ceased operations after one year in the ACFL, and their players were distributed as part of a dispersal draft in May 1971.

== Season-by-season ==
	Year	League	W	L	T	Finish	Coach
Jersey Jays	1969	Continental Football League	7	5	0	3rd, Atlantic Division	Nick Cutro
Jersey Jays	1970	Atlantic Coast Football League	7	5	0	2nd, Northern Division	Nick Cutro
