= Fred Williams (defensive lineman) =

American football player (1929–2000)

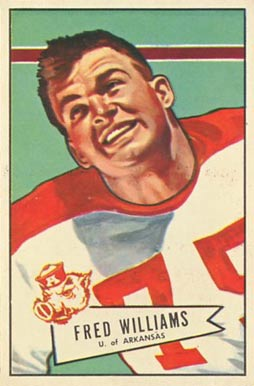
- Williams on a 1952 Bowman football card

No. 75, 77
- Positions: Defensive tackle, guard

Personal information
- Born: February 8, 1929; Little Rock, Arkansas, U.S.
- Died: October 11, 2000 (aged 71); Heber Springs, Arkansas, U.S.
- Listed height: 6 ft 4 in (1.93 m)
- Listed weight: 249 lb (113 kg)

Career information
- High school: Little Rock Central
- College: Arkansas (1948–1951)
- NFL draft: 1952: 5th round, 56th overall pick

Career history

Playing
- Chicago Bears (1952–1963); Washington Redskins (1964–1965)

Coaching
- Arkansas Diamonds (1968–1969) Defensive / head coach

Awards and highlights
- NFL champion (1963); 4× Pro Bowl (1952–1953, 1958–1959); 100 greatest Bears of All-Time; Helms Athletic Foundation Hall of Fame (1967)

Career NFL statistics
- Interceptions: 2
- Fumble recoveries: 9
- Sacks: 2.5
- Stats at Pro Football Reference

Fred Williams (February 8, 1929 – October 11, 2000) was an American professional football player who was a defensive lineman in the National Football League (NFL) for the Chicago Bears and Washington Redskins. Williams played college football for the Arkansas Razorbacks and was selected in the fifth round of the 1952 NFL draft. He was named to four Pro Bowls during his 14-year NFL career.

== Early life ==
Williams was born in Little Rock, Arkansas and attended Little Rock Central High School. While attending Little Rock Central, he played high school football and was a two-time All-State selection. While in high school, Williams also won championships in basketball and boxing.

== College career ==
Williams attended and played college football at the University of Arkansas. He played in the 1952 Chicago College All-Star Game. Williams was also a boxing and wrestling champion while attending Arkansas.

== Professional career ==
Williams was drafted in the fifth round of the 1952 NFL draft by the Chicago Bears, where he played from 1952 to 1963 and was part of the Bears' 1963 NFL Championship team. He played defensive end and tackle with sporadic appearances at linebacker, a versatility that Chicago Tribune writer Cooper Rollow suggested led to his lack of accolades as he was never named All-Pro. Nicknamed "Fat Freddy", he was popular among fans and media for his humor, frequently joking about various team-related situations; in 1959, when asked if the Bears' defensive line was the best in the league, he remarked, "I don't know if we're the best, but we sure are the ugliest."

In 1964, he was traded to the Washington Redskins, along with Angelo Coia, for the Redskins' sixth overall pick in the 1965 NFL draft, which they used to select Steve DeLong. When the Redskins played Williams' former team that year, he was involved in a fight with Bears center Mike Pyle after Williams jumped offside and hit Pyle in the head with his forearm. Williams spent two seasons in Washington.

== Personal life ==
After retiring from the NFL, Williams became a liquor salesman. He died from a stroke on October 9, 2000, in Heber Springs, Arkansas.
