= Gil Petmanis =

Canadian football player (born 1942)

Profile
- Positions: Halfback, Defensive back

Personal information
- Born: April 12, 1942 (age 84); Riga, Latvia
- Listed height: 6 ft 0 in (1.83 m)
- Listed weight: 179 lb (81 kg)

Career history
- 1965: Toronto Rifles
- 1966: Saskatchewan Roughriders
- 1968–1970: Toronto Argonauts
- ?: B.C. Lions
- ?: Hamilton Tiger Cats

Awards and highlights
- Grey Cup champion (1966)

Elgis "Gil" Petmanis (born April 12, 1942) is a Latvian former professional Canadian football player who played for the Toronto Argonauts, B.C. Lions, Hamilton Tiger Cats, and Saskatchewan Roughriders. He won the Grey Cup with Saskatchewan in 1966.
