= Arkansas Diamonds (disambiguation) =

The Arkansas Diamonds are an arena football team.

Arkansas Diamonds may also refer to:

- Arkansas Diamonds (soccer), 1989-1995
- Arkansas Diamonds (American football), 1966-1970
- Texas Revolution (indoor football), known as the Arkansas Diamonds in the 2010 season
- Arkansas Diamonds, a team in the American Football Association (1977–1983)
