= Wheeling Island Stadium =

Stadium in Wheeling, West Virginia

Coordinates: 40.064329°N 80.730141°W

- Interactive map of Wheeling Island Stadium
- Location: 520 South Penn Street Wheeling, West Virginia, U.S.
- Owner: Wheeling Park High School
- Operator: Wheeling Park High School
- Capacity: 12,220

Construction
- Opened: June 10, 1927
- Renovated: 1987

Tenant
- Wheeling Ironmen (UFL/CoFL) (1962–1969)

Wheeling Island Stadium is a stadium used mostly for American football and soccer located on Wheeling Island in Wheeling, West Virginia. The original portion of the stadium was dedicated on June 10, 1927, but a large concrete seating section was added in 1987. The stadium seats 12,220 in two stands along either sidelines, the end zones are empty. Wheeling Island Stadium usually hosts high school football and soccer events but can host concerts, hosting Styx and REO Speedwagon most recently in 2009. President John F. Kennedy delivered a speech at the stadium on September 27, 1962.

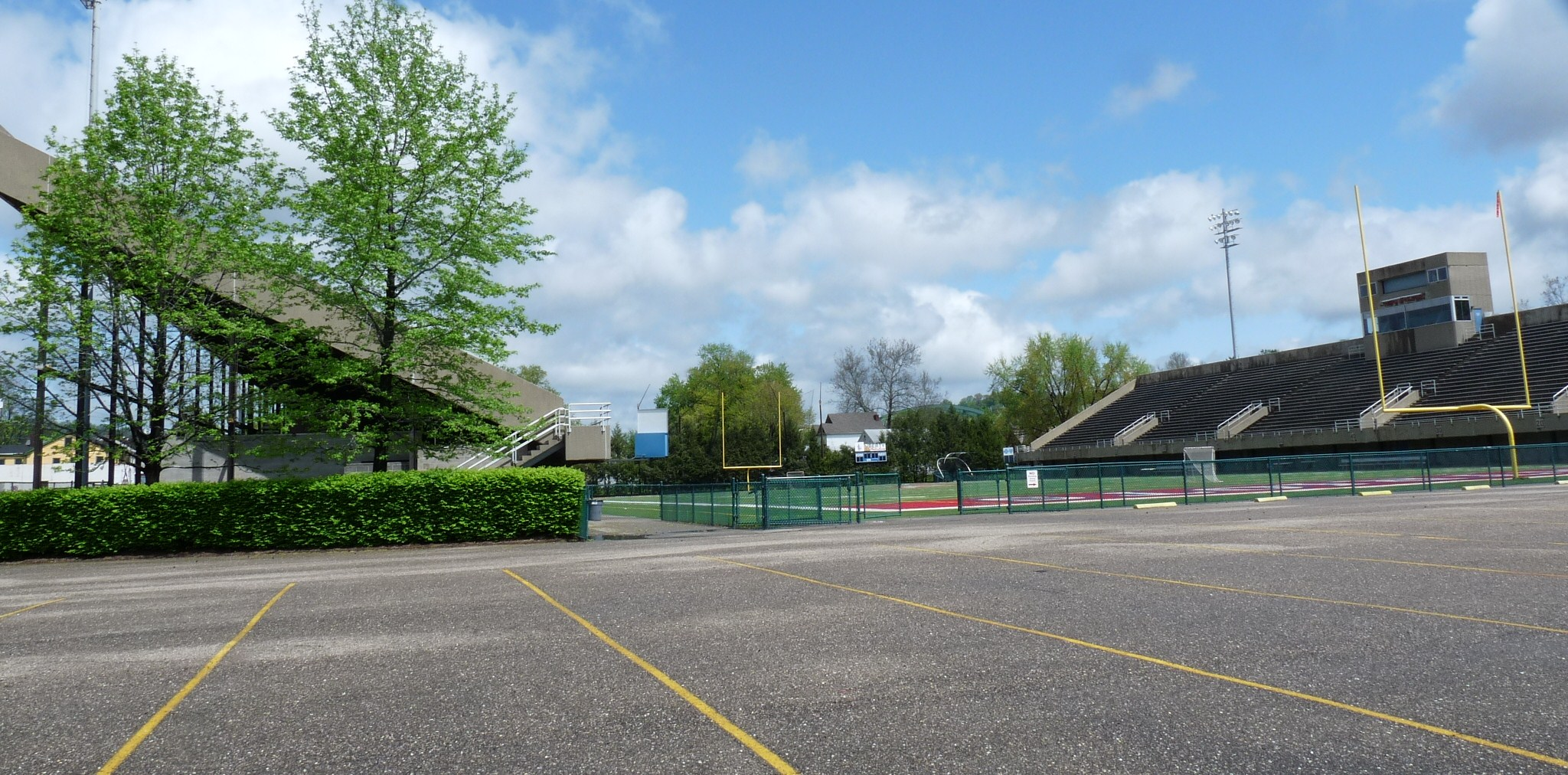
Wheeling Island Stadium

The stadium is owned and operated by Wheeling Park High School. From 1994 through the 2023 season, Wheeling Island Stadium served as the host site for the West Virginia State High School Football Championships in Class A, Class AA, and Class AAA.

The stadium is considered one of the best high school stadiums in West Virginia, mainly due to capacity and layout of the facility. There is plenty of parking adjacent to the stadium, and a private lot adjacent to the south end zone for school personnel, media, and pass holders. The stadium is complete with a 3 level press box with camera deck and private boxes for the coaches. In 2008, a video system was installed at the stadium, several corporate sponsors donated to the project including Wheeling Hospital. Students from Wheeling Park High School's TV station, WPHP-TV, operate the cameras for all Wheeling Park football and soccer games.

In 2004, the previous grass surface was replaced with an artificial turf surface. Due to the stadium's location in a high risk flood zone, there is an emergency plan to seal the playing surface in the event of flooding.
