= Leo Cahill =

Personal information
- Born: July 30, 1928; Utica, Illinois, U.S.
- Died: February 15, 2018 (aged 89); Atlanta, Georgia, U.S.

Career history

Coaching
- 1953: Illinois (freshman assistant)
- 1954–1955: Lewis (line)
- 1956–1957: Toledo (line)
- 1958–1959: South Carolina (assistant)
- 1960–1964: Montreal Alouettes (assistant)
- 1965–1966: Toronto Rifles
- 1967–1972: Toronto Argonauts
- 1977–1978: Toronto Argonauts

general manager
- 1974: Memphis Southmen
- 1975: Chicago Winds
- 1986–1988: Toronto Argonauts
- 1996: Ottawa Rough Riders

Awards and highlights
- Third-team All-American (1950); Annis Stukus Trophy (1971); Ontario Sports Hall of Fame (2013)

Other information
- Military career
- Allegiance: United States
- Branch: United States Army
- Conflict: Korean War

Leo Cahill (July 30, 1928 – February 15, 2018) was an American head coach and general manager in the Canadian Football League (CFL), much of it spent with the Toronto Argonauts.

== Early life ==
Cahill was born on July 30, 1928, in Utica, Illinois, and later attended the University of Illinois on a football scholarship. He appeared as a freshman in the 1947 Rose Bowl, but missed the following season due to injury. When he returned in 1948, he was moved from center to guard. He was on the northern roster for the 1950 Blue–Gray Football Classic.

== Military service ==
Cahill served in the United States Army during the Korean War. He enlisted in February 1951 and served as a combat medic in Korea. In 1952, he was assigned to the 1st Cavalry Division and coached a division football team in Japan.

== Career ==
Following his honourable discharge in 1953, Cahill returned to his alma mater, where he earned his master's degree and served as an assistant freshman football coach. In 1954 and 1955 he was the line coach at Lewis College. In 1956, he joined the coaching staff at the University of Toledo. After two seasons with the South Carolina Gamecocks, Cahill moved to the Canadian Football League in the 1960 as an assistant coach with the Montreal Alouettes. In 1965, he became head coach of the Toronto Rifles of the Continental Football League. Under Cahill's leadership, the Rifles compiled a 20–8 record and won the Eastern Conference title in 1965.

Cahill was appointed head coach of the Toronto Argonauts in 1967. In his first season as coach, Cahill led Toronto to its first playoff appearance since 1961. In 1971, he led the Argonauts to their first Grey Cup appearance in 19 years and won the league's coach of the year award. The following year, the Argos went 3–11 and missed the playoffs for the first time under Cahill. On November 9, 1972, Cahill was fired by Toronto Argonauts owner John W. H. Bassett. Following his dismissal, Cahill wrote a book, Goodbye Argos, with sportswriter Scott Young that was critical of the Argonauts organization, specifically the team's board of directors and general manager John Barrow, as well as his former boss in Montreal, Jim Trimble, and Hamilton Tiger-Cats president Ralph Sazio, who he accused of interfering with his getting the Alouettes head coaching job in 1973.

In 1974, Cahill was named general manager of the Toronto Northmen of the World Football League, which were owned by Bassett's son, John F. Bassett. Cahill and Bassett signed three of the Miami Dolphins top players – Larry Csonka, Jim Kiick, and Paul Warfield. The team ending up moving to Memphis, Tennessee due to pressure from the federal government and became the Memphis Southmen. In 1975, Cahill left Memphis to become GM of another WFL team – Chicago Winds. After the league folded, Cahill returned to Toronto as the chief operating officer of the North American Soccer League's Toronto Metros and also worked as a sports commentator for CHUM.

On December 20, 1976, Cahill was rehired as head coach of the Toronto Argonauts. He led Toronto to a 6–10 record in 1977 and was fired following a 3–6 start to the 1978 season.

In 1979, Cahill began working as a sports commentator for CFGM, a radio station in Richmond Hill, Ontario. In 1981, he and Ron Lancaster replaced Russ Jackson on CBC's coverage of the CFL.

In 1986, Cahill returned to the Argonauts a second time, this time as general manager. He was hired by team president Ralph Sazio, whom Cahill had an acrimonious relationship with. It was hoped that Cahill's hiring would help increase ticket sales for the struggling franchise and that as a media personality, he would be able to help with marketing as well as football operations. That year the Argos, led by quarterback J. C. Watts, finished first place in the East Division. In 1987, Watts left football due to his displeasure with Cahill. Following bitter contract negotiations, Watts stated that he would not "let incompetent, insecure people like Leo Cahill hold the key to my future; I won't let a fool like that intimidate me" and returned to his hometown of Oklahoma City, where he owned highway construction company, worked public relations for a high school, and was youth director of his church. Toronto went 11–6–1 without Watts and played in that year's Grey Cup. Following the 1988 season, the team was purchased by Harry Ornest, who chose to retain Sazio and not renew Cahill's contract.

After leaving the Argonauts, Cahill worked as a leasing manager for Toronto auto firm, was a motivational speaker, and was a scouting consultant for the San Francisco 49ers. In 1996, he returned to the CFL as vice-president of operations for the Ottawa Rough Riders. In this role, Cahill oversaw football operations as well as marketing and public relations. The team folded at the end of the season.

From 2004 onward, Cahill served as goodwill ambassador for the Argonauts.

Cahill was inducted into the Ontario Sports Hall of Fame in 2013 in recognition of his contributions to the Argonauts franchise.

== Death ==
Leo Cahill died at an Atlanta hospital on February 15, 2018, at the age of 89, and is survived by five children: Steve, Christy, Terry, Lisa and Bettye.
