= Louisville Raiders =

Defunct American football team (1960–62)

- Founded: 1960
- Folded: 1962
- League: United Football League
- Based in: Louisville, Kentucky
- Arena: Fairgrounds Stadium
- Championships: 0

The Louisville Raiders were a team in the United Football League from 1960 through 1962. Organized in March 1960, the team played their home games at Fairgrounds Stadium in Louisville, Kentucky. The Raiders went 4–6 in 1961 and 4–7–1 in 1962.

== See also ==
- Sports in Louisville, Kentucky
