= Steve Smear =

American gridiron football player (born 1948)

Profile
- Positions: Defensive end, Linebacker

Personal information
- Born: May 18, 1948 (age 78); Johnstown, Pennsylvania, U.S.
- Listed height: 6 ft 1 in (1.85 m)
- Listed weight: 230 lb (104 kg)

Career information
- College: Penn State
- NFL draft: 1970: 4th round, 95th overall pick

Career history
- 1970–1972: Montreal Alouettes
- 1973: Toronto Argonauts
- 1974–1975: Saskatchewan Roughriders

Awards and highlights
- Grey Cup champion (1970); CFL All-Star (1970); 2× CFL East All-Star (1970, 1971); Second-team All-American (1969); Nils V. "Swede" Nelson Award (1969); First-team All-East (1969)

Steve Smear (born May 18, 1948) is an American former professional football defensive end and linebacker for the Montreal Alouettes of the Canadian Football League (CFL). He was a CFL All-Star in 1970 and was a part of a Grey Cup victory for the Alouettes.

He was named an All-American defensive tackle in 1968 while playing at Penn State University.

He was awarded the Nils V. "Swede" Nelson Award in 1968.

He was inducted into the Pennsylvania Sports Hall of Fame in 2013.
