= Nils V. "Swede" Nelson Award =

American college football award

- Awarded for: "the player who by his conduct on and off the gridiron demonstrates a high esteem for the football code and exemplifies sportsmanship to an outstanding degree."
- Location: Boston, Massachusetts, U.S.
- Country: United States
- Presented by: Gridiron Club of Greater Boston

History
- First award: 1946
- Most recent: Michael Berluti
- Website: http://gridclubofgreaterboston.com/awards/swede-nelson-award.html

The Nils V. "Swede" Nelson Award is an American college football award given annually by the Gridiron Club of Greater Boston to "the player who by his conduct on and off the gridiron demonstrates a high esteem for the football code and exemplifies sportsmanship to an outstanding degree" among northeastern colleges and universities. In 1982, the award was narrowed to the player deemed to be the "very best, and most academically talented, college football player in New England."

Since 1989, the award has been given annually to two players (with the exception of a single winner in 1996, three winners in 2007 and 2015, and no award given during the 2020 season due to the COVID-19 pandemic), one from a Division I football program, and one from a small college.

The award is the fourth oldest collegiate football award in the United States, following the Heisman Trophy, Maxwell Award, and George "Bulger" Lowe trophies.

The award is named after the founder of the Gridiron Club, Nils V. "Swede" Nelson, a former college player at Harvard and coach. Nelson was a member of the unbeaten Harvard football team that defeated Oregon in the 1920 Rose Bowl.

The inaugural winner of the trophy was quarterback Perry Moss of Illinois in 1946. Other notable winners of the award include Doak Walker (1949), Johnny Bright (1951), Floyd Little (1966), Dick Jauron (1971), Otis Armstrong (1972), Tom Waddle (1988), Jay Fiedler (1992), Matt Hasselbeck (1997), Mark Herzlich (2009), Anthony Castonzo (2010), and Zach Allen (2018).

== Past winners ==
Year	Player	Position	School
2025	Edwin Kolenge	DE	Boston College
2025	Carter Peevy	QB	Maine
2025	Tyler Pohlman	DB	Springfield College
2024	Austin Gentle	OL	Harvard
2024	Michael Berluti	QB	Tufts
2023	Justin Anagonye	OL	Brown
2023	Brady Klein	RB	MIT
2022	Vinny DePalma	LB	Boston College
2022	Tony Hooks	LB	Bates College
2021	Peter Oliver	RB	Holy Cross
2021	Mike Pedrini	RB	Tufts
2019	Jake McIntyre	K	Harvard
2019	Nick Bainter	OL	Springfield College
2018	Zach Allen	DL	Boston College
2018	Joe Wilson	OL	Wesleyan University
2017	Peter Pujals	QB	Holy Cross
2017	Chris Hayden	OL	Springfield College
2016	Justin Wain	P	Connecticut
2016	Mark Upton	LB	Bates College
2015	Brian Strachan	WR	Brown
2015	Anthony Massucci	DB	Stonehill College
2015	Ty Spencer	WR	Fitchburg State
2014	Tyler Varga	RB	Yale
2014	Danny Guadagnoli	QB	Bentley University
2013	Devin Brown	DB	UMass
2013	Tim Grupp	OL	WPI
2012	Emmett Cleary	OL	Boston College
2012	Ethan Peterson	OL	MIT
2011	Patrick Witt	QB	Yale
2011	Bryant Johnson	QB	Bentley
2010	Anthony Castonzo	OL	Boston College
2010	Ryan Schmid	DL	Coast Guard
2009	Mark Herzlich	LB	Boston College
2009	Alex Rubino	DL	MIT
2008	Andrew Berry	DB	Harvard
2008	James Oleinik	OL	MIT
2007	Dan Guariglia	OL	Amherst
2007	Ryne Nutt	C	Central Connecticut
2007	Steve Morgan	P/K	Brown
2006	Ed McCarthy	OL	Yale
2006	Brendan Fulmer	WR/P/K	Williams
2005	David Diamond	OL	Bowdoin
2005	Nick Hartigan	RB	Brown
2004	Keron Henry	WR	Connecticut
2004	Fletcher Ladd	RB	Amherst
2003	Steve Fox	OL	Holy Cross
2003	Greg Wood	WR	Worcester State
2002	Kevin Noone	OL	Dartmouth
2002	Chuck McGraw	RB	Tufts
2001	John Richardson	OL	Boston College
2001	Bob Montgomery	C	UMass Lowell
2000	Eric Johnson	WR	Yale
2000	Tim McCarthy	OL	Middlebury
1999	Isaiah Kacyvenski	LB	Harvard
1999	Nicholas Kozy	OL	MIT
1998	Matt Jordan	WR	UMass
1998	Eric Trum	OL	Tufts
1997	Matt Hasselbeck	QB	Boston College
1997	Daniel Lord	OL	Tufts
1996	Joseph DeAngelis	OL	Trinity
1995	Tim O'Brien	OL	Boston College
1995	Mike Rymsha	QB	Bentley
1994	Andre Miksimow	OL	Boston University
1994	Nate Sleeper	QB	Williams
1993	Keith Miller	RB	Boston College
1993	Michael Turmelle	DB	Bowdoin
1992	Jay Fiedler	QB	Dartmouth
1992	Roderick Tranum	WR	MIT
1991	Paul Capriotti	RB	Maine
1991	Paul Oliveira	OL	Tufts
1990	Brad Preble	DB	Dartmouth
1990	Mark Katz	OL	Bowdoin
1989	Ben Cowan	OL	Boston University
1989	Rich Schachner	RB	Coast Guard
1988	Tom Waddle	WR	Boston College
1987	Gordie Lockbaum	RB/DB	Holy Cross
1986	Stan Kaczorowski	OL	UMass
1985	Guy Carbone	OL	Rhode Island
1984	Steve Strachan	RB	Boston College
1983	Matt Martin	LB	Holy Cross
1982	John Loughery	QB	Boston College
1981	Kenny Duckett	WR	Wake Forest
1980	Jerry Pierce	LB	Dartmouth
1979	Tom Bell	OL	BYU
1978	Rick Leach	QB	Michigan
1977	Roy Heffernan	RB	Middlebury
1976	Peter Cronan	LB	Boston College
1975	George Niland	OL	Trinity
1974	Peter Gorniewicz	RB	Colby
1973	James Stoeckel	WR	Harvard
1972	Otis Armstrong	RB	Purdue
1971	Richard Jauron	RB	Yale
1970	Rock Perdoni	DL	Georgia Tech
1969	Steve Smear	DL	Penn State
1968	Vic Gatto	RB	Harvard
1967	Brian Dowling	QB	Yale
1966	Floyd Little	RB	Syracuse
1965	Thomas Clarke	OL	Dartmouth
1964	Arthur Roberts	RB	Columbia
1963	Bob Cappadona	RB	Northeastern
1962	Pat Culpepper	LB	Texas
1961	Joseph Kowalski	OL	Rutgers
1960	Alan Rozycki	RB	Dartmouth
1959	George Roden	HB	Colby
1958	J.W. Brodnax	RB	LSU
1957	Thomas Salvo	OL	Boston University
1956	James Swink	RB	TCU
1955	Don Holleder	TE	Army
1954	Arthur Luppino	RB	Arizona
1953	Don King	QB	Clemson
1952	Joseph Mitinger	QB	Yale
1951	Johnny Bright	RB	Drake
1950	Bob Williams	QB	Notre Dame
1949	Doak Walker	RB/DB/K	SMU
1948	Gordon Long	OL	Arkansas
1947	Everett Dorr	RB	Boston University
1946	Perry Moss	QB	Illinois
