= Doak Walker =

American football player (1927–1998)

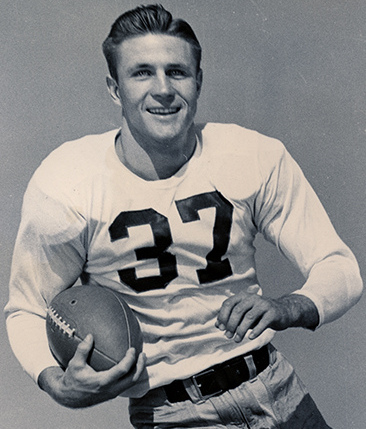
- Walker in 1948

No. 37
- Positions: Halfback, kicker

Personal information
- Born: January 1, 1927; Dallas, Texas, U.S.
- Died: September 27, 1998 (aged 71); Steamboat Springs, Colorado, U.S.
- Listed height: 5 ft 11 in (1.80 m)
- Listed weight: 173 lb (78 kg)

Career information
- High school: Highland Park (University Park, Texas)
- College: SMU (1945; 1947–1949)
- NFL draft: 1949: 1st round, 3rd overall pick

Career history
- Detroit Lions (1950–1955)

Awards and highlights
- 2× NFL champion (1952, 1953); 4× First-team All-Pro (1950, 1951, 1953, 1954); 5× Pro Bowl (1950, 1951, 1953–1955); 2× NFL scoring leader (1950, 1955); Pride of the Lions; Detroit Lions 75th Anniversary Team; Detroit Lions All-Time Team; Detroit Lions No. 37 retired; Heisman Trophy (1948); Maxwell Award (1947); SN Player of the Year (1948); Unanimous All-American (1948); 2× Consensus All-American (1947,1949); 4× First-team All-SWC (1945, 1947–1949); Nils V. "Swede" Nelson Award (1949); SMU Mustangs No. 37 honored

Career NFL statistics
- Rushing yards: 1,520
- Rushing average: 4.9
- Rushing touchdowns: 12
- Receptions: 152
- Receiving yards: 2,539
- Receiving touchdowns: 21
- Points scored: 534
- Stats at Pro Football Reference
- Pro Football Hall of Fame
- College Football Hall of Fame

Ewell Doak Walker II (January 1, 1927 – September 27, 1998) was an American football player who was a halfback and kicker. He played college football for the SMU Mustangs, winning the Maxwell Award in 1947 and the Heisman Trophy in 1948. He then played professionally for the Detroit Lions of the National Football League (NFL) from 1950 to 1955. Walker was inducted into the College Football Hall of Fame in 1959 and the Pro Football Hall of Fame in 1986. The Doak Walker Award, awarded annually since 1990 to the top running back in college football, is named after him.

== Early life ==
Walker was born in Dallas, Texas, in 1927. His father, Ewell Doak Walker Sr., was a Tennessee native and a school teacher who later became assistant superintendent and personnel director of the Dallas school system. His mother Emma was a Texas native, and he had a younger sister, Elsa.

Walker attended Highland Park High School in University Park, where he was a five-sport athlete in football, basketball, baseball, swimming, and track and field. In 1944, Doak Walker led his high school football team to the state championship game. He and future college and NFL star Bobby Layne were teammates at Highland Park; Layne played college football for the Texas Longhorns in Austin.

Following his graduation from high school in 1945, Walker joined the Merchant Marine. The war ended in August 1945, and Walker was discharged from the Merchant Marine on November 1, 1945.

== Football career ==
=== SMU (1945; 1947–1949) ===
Two days after being discharged from the Merchant Marine, Walker appeared in his first college football game for Southern Methodist University. Walker played in five games for the SMU Mustangs in November 1945 and was sufficiently impressive as a halfback and placekicker as to win All-Southwest Conference honors and a spot in the annual East–West Shrine Game in San Francisco. In the Shrine game, he threw a tying touchdown pass for the West team.

Walker did not play college football in 1946, as he was inducted into the U.S. Army in March 1946. His stint was brief, playing football for the Brooke Medical Center service team in San Antonio before being discharged in January 1947.

Following his discharge, Walker re-enrolled at SMU and rejoined the Mustangs football team. As a sophomore, he led Southern Methodist to a 1947 SWC championship and was named to a myriad of All-American teams. He gained similar All-American honors in 1948, and 1949. Walker won the Maxwell Award as a sophomore in 1947 and the Heisman Trophy in 1948 as a junior.

During his award-winning 1948 season, Walker gained 532 yards on the ground, carrying the ball 108 times for a 4.9 yards per carry average. He also threw six touchdown passes from the halfback position, going 26-for-46 and gaining 304 yards in the air. As a receiver, Walker hauled in 15 passes for 279 yards and 3 touchdowns. On the defensive side of the ball, he intercepted three passes. He also punted for a 42.1 yard average for the Mustangs, returned punts and kickoffs, and did duty as the SMU placekicker. Walker finished the year with 11 touchdowns scored, which combined with his kicking put 88 points on the scoreboard for the year.

Walker's impact on SMU and football in the Dallas area led to the Cotton Bowl's expansion and nickname: "The House That Doak Built." He was also a member of Phi Delta Theta fraternity, the men's society Cycen Fjodr, and lettered on the SMU basketball and baseball teams.

In 1999, Sports Illustrated included him on its All-Century Team for college football.

=== Detroit Lions (1950–1955) ===
Following his junior year at SMU, Walker was selected by the Boston Yanks with the third pick of in the 1949 NFL draft, held in December 1948. The Detroit Lions acquired Walker's rights from Boston in exchange for John Rauch, whom the Lions had selected with the second pick of the 1949 NFL Draft. The Cleveland Browns held the AAFC to arbitrate their conflicting claims or flip a coin. Instead, the Browns agreed in January 1950 to forego their claim to Walker in exchange for the Lions' second pick in the 1950 NFL draft.

In Detroit, Walker was reunited with former high school teammate Bobby Layne who the Lions acquired by trade in April 1950. The two Texans led the Lions to one of the top scoring offenses during the 1950 NFL season, as Layne led the NFL with 2,323 passing yards and Walker led the league with 128 points on five rushing touchdowns, six receiving touchdowns, 38 extra points, and eight field goals. Walker appeared in all 12 games for the 1950 Lions at the left halfback position; he rushed for 386 yards on 83 carries (4.7 yards per carry), caught 34 passes for 534 yards, and totaled 1,262 all-purpose yards. He was selected by both the Associated Press (AP) and United Press (UP) as a first-team player on the 1950 All-Pro Team. His 128 points in 1950 was the second highest single-season total in NFL history to that time.

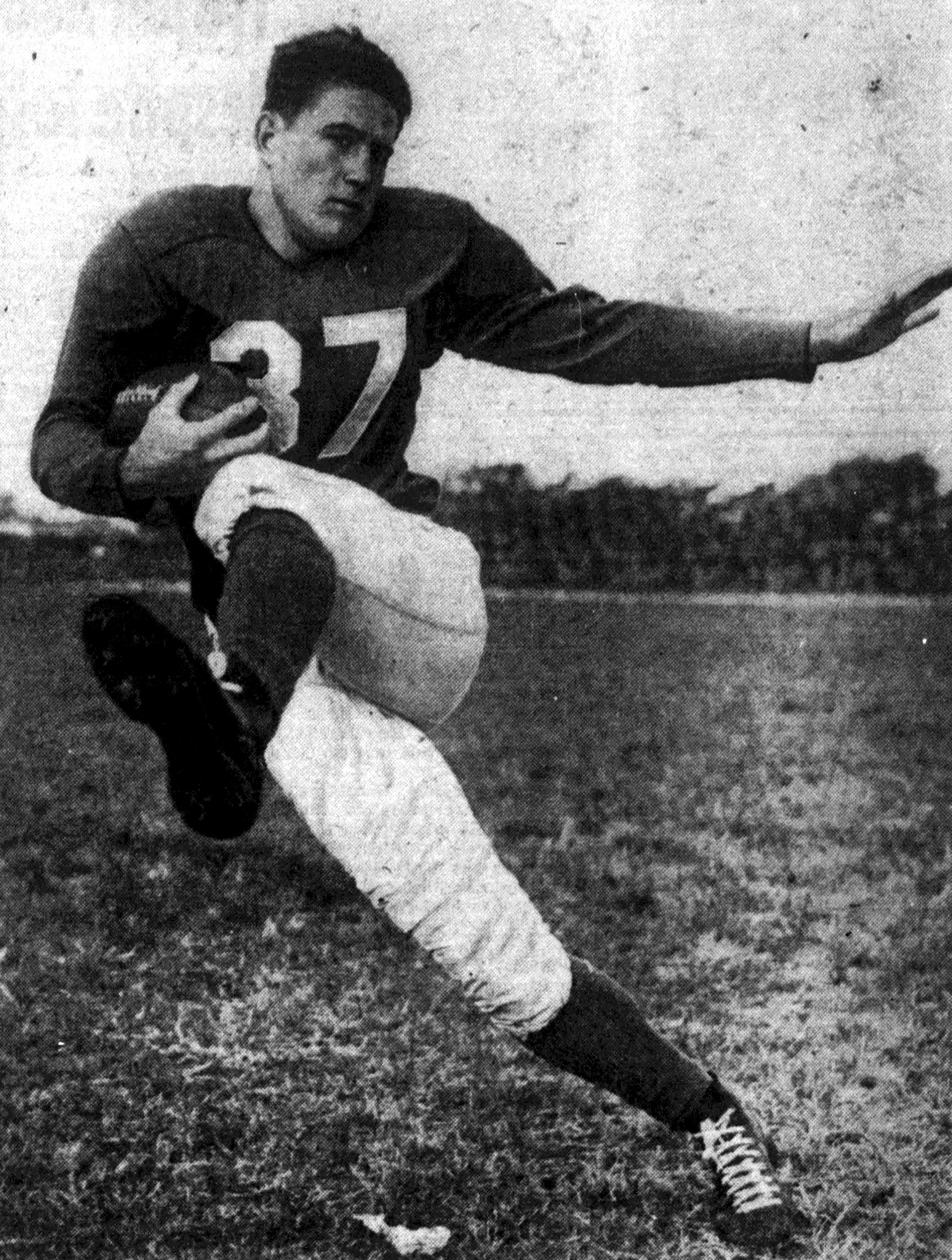
Walker, circa 1951

Walker had another strong season in 1951, appearing in all 12 games at left halfback for the Lions, totaling 1,270 all-purpose yards (fourth best in the NFL), scoring 97 points (third best in the NFL), and leading the NFL with 43 extra points. He was again selected by the AP and UP as a first-team All-Pro.

Walker suffered leg injuries that limited him to seven games during the 1952 season. He was fully recovered in time for the post-season and rushed for 97 yards and caught two passes against the Browns in the 1952 NFL Championship Game.

Healthy for the full 1953 season, Walker helped lead the Lions to their second consecutive NFL championship. He ranked third in the NFL with 93 points scored and totaled 978 all-purpose yards, including 502 receiving yards and 337 rushing yards. In the 1953 NFL Championship Game, he scored a touchdown and kicked a field goal and an extra point to account for 10 of the Lions' 17 points. At the end of the 1953 season, Walker was selected by the AP as a first-team All-Pro and by the UP as a second-team All-Pro.

In 1954, Walker helped lead the Lions to their third consecutive NFL Western Division championship. He led the NFL with 43 extra points (out of 43 attempted) and an average of 14.4 yards per touch. He ranked second in the NFL with 106 points scored and third with 11 field goals. He also kicked a field goal and an extra point in the 1954 NFL Championship Game and was selected by the AP, UP, and The Sporting News as a first-team back on the 1954 All-Pro Team.

In July 1955, Walker signed a contract worth $27,500 to play a final season for the Lions and to serve as a special scout for the Lions in Texas in 1956 and 1957. At age 28, Walker retired not because his abilities had diminished but because of the need to attend to multiple business interests in Texas. In his final season, he appeared in all 12 games for the Lions and led the NFL in scoring with 96 points. Walker scored 11 points in the final game of the season to secure the league's scoring title. His 1955 scoring title was remarkable given the fact that it was achieved while playing for a team that won only three games and compiled the worst record in the NFL.

On December 11, 1955, the day of Walker's final regular season game, the Lions held a "Doak Walker Day" at Briggs Stadium at which he was presented with a silver football engraved with the names of his teammates and coaches. Walker's jersey (No. 37) was also retired as part of the ceremony.

Walker's final NFL appearance was in the 1956 Pro Bowl at the Los Angeles Memorial Coliseum on January 15, 1956.

At the time of his retirement, Walker ranked third in NFL history with 534 points scored (not including 21 post-season points) in six NFL seasons. Only Don Hutson (825 points in 11 seasons) and Bob Waterfield (573 points in eight seasons) had scored more points. Walker also totaled 1,520 rushing yards on 309 carries (4.9 yards per carry) and 152 receptions for 2,539 yards (16.7 yards per reception).

=== Honors and legacy ===
Walker received numerous honors for his football career. His honors include the following:

- In 1955, the Detroit Lions retired his jersey (No. 37), the first uniform number retired by the Lions.
- In 1959, he was inducted into the College Football Hall of Fame.
- In 1981, he received the Golden Plate Award of the American Academy of Achievement presented by Awards Council member Tom Landry. He was presented alongside fellow honoree Bobby Layne.
- In 1986, he was inducted into the Pro Football Hall of Fame. Bobby Layne presented Walker for his induction and said of Walker, "He was the greatest clutch player I ever saw. . . . I'll tell ya, if we were ahead 28–0 or somethin', you might not notice Doak on the field. But if it was a close game, everybody knew he was there and he would be the difference."
- The Doak Walker Award, first awarded in 1990, is presented annually to the best running back in college football.
- In 2007, Walker was ranked No. 4 on ESPN's list of the top 25 players in college football history.
- A statue of Walker was placed between Gerald Ford Stadium and SMU's Dedman Center for Lifetime Sports.

Sports Illustrated writer Rick Reilly said of Walker shortly before his death:

"He's Doak Walker, and he was as golden as golden gets. He had perfectly even, white teeth and a jaw as square as a deck of cards and a mop of brown hair that made girls bite their necklaces. He was so shifty you couldn't have tackled him in a phone booth, yet so humble that he wrote the Associated Press a thank-you note for naming him an All-American. Come to think of it, he was a three-time All-American, twice one of the Outstanding Players in the Cotton Bowl, a four-time All-Pro. He appeared on 47 covers, including Life, Look and Collier's. One time, Kyle Rote, another gridiron golden boy, saw a guy buying a football magazine at a newsstand. 'Don't buy that one,' Rote said. 'It's not official. It doesn't have a picture of Doak Walker on the cover.'"

Shortly after Walker's death in 1998, Texas running back Ricky Williams wore Walker's number 37 in a game as opposed to his customary number 34 in remembrance of Walker. Williams, who befriended Walker when they met after winning the 1997 Doak Walker Award, would go on to set the NCAA all-time rushing record that season (since been eclipsed by Ron Dayne) and win the Heisman Trophy.

== NFL career statistics ==
Legend
	Won NFL Championship
	Led the league
**Bold**	Career high

=== Rushing & receiving stats ===
Year	Team	Games		Rushing						Receiving					Fumbles	
Year	Team	GP	GS	Att	Yds	Avg	Y/G	Lng	TD	Rec	Yds	Avg	Lng	TD	Fum	FR
1950	DET	**12**	**12**	**83**	**386**	4.7	**32.2**	30	**5**	**35**	534	15.3	43	**6**	**3**	0
1951	DET	**12**	**12**	79	356	4.5	29.7	34	2	22	421	19.1	63	4	1	**2**
1952	DET	7	4	26	106	4.1	15.1	20	0	11	90	8.2	18	0	1	0
1953	DET	**12**	**12**	66	337	5.1	28.1	50	2	30	502	16.7	**83**	3	2	0
1954	DET	**12**	**12**	32	240	**7.5**	20.0	38	1	32	**564**	17.6	66	3	1	0
1955	DET	**12**	9	23	95	4.1	7.9	51	2	22	428	**19.5**	70	5	1	1
Career		67	61	309	1,520	4.9	22.7	51	12	152	2,539	16.7	83	21	9	3

=== Kicking stats ===
Season	Team	G	FGM	FGA	%	LNG	XPM	XPA	%	PTS
1950	DET	12	8	18	44.4	–	38	41	92.7	62
1951	DET	12	6	12	50.0	–	**43**	**44**	97.7	61
1952	DET	7	3	5	60.0	–	5	5	**100.0**	14
1953	DET	12	**12**	**19**	63.2	–	27	29	93.1	63
1954	DET	12	11	17	**64.7**	–	**43**	43	**100.0**	**76**
1955	DET	12	9	16	56.3	–	27	29	93.1	54
Career		67	49	87	56.3	47	183	191	95.8	330

== Family and later years ==
In March 1950, Walker married his college sweetheart, Norma Jane Peterson, at the Highland Park Presbyterian Church in Dallas. His groomsmen included Bobby Layne and Kyle Rote. They had four children: Laurie ('52), Kris ('56), Russ ('60), and Scott ('63), but divorced in 1965. Walker married Olympic ski racer Skeeter Werner in 1969, and they lived in her hometown of Steamboat Springs, Colorado.

Walker left pro football in 1955 to concentrate on his private business interests in sporting goods and as a sales executive with an electrical contracting company. Walker took a position as a coach with the Akron Vulcans of the Continental Football League. When the Vulcans owner was exposed as a con-artist and stopped paying his bills, Walker and his assistant coaches (Tobin Rote and Lou Rymkus being among them) kept the team alive as long as they could with funds out of their own pockets; Walker eventually quit before the team folded. He later founded Walker Chemicals in Denver, a company he sold upon retirement.

In January 1998, at age 71, Walker was paralyzed from the neck down in a skiing accident at Steamboat Springs. After hitting a change in terrain, he flew 20 to 30 feet in the air and tumbled 75 feet. He died that September from injuries sustained in the accident.

== See also ==
- List of NCAA major college yearly punt and kickoff return leaders
