= San Antonio Wings =

American football team (1975)

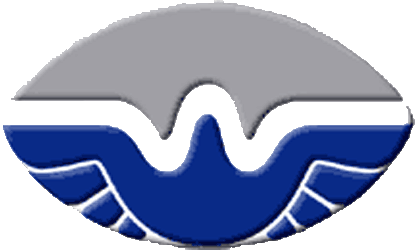
Logo

General information
- Founded: January 1975
- Folded: October 1975
- Stadium: Alamo Stadium (25,000)
- Headquartered: San Antonio, Texas
- Colours: Sky Blue & Cloud Silver

Personnel
- Owner: Norman Bevan
- General manager: Duncan McCauley
- Head coach: Perry Moss

League / conference affiliations
- World Football League; Western Division

The San Antonio Wings were an American football team who played a single season in the World Football League in 1975. The team started as the Florida Blazers in 1974, then moved to San Antonio, Texas in 1975, becoming the San Antonio Wings.

== History ==
The Florida Blazers never drew well, leading team owner Rommie Loudd to openly discuss moving the team to Atlanta in the middle of the 1974 season. The players and coaches were not paid for three months. Shortly after the Blazers' defeat in the World Bowl, Loudd was arrested on tax evasion and cocaine trafficking charges. He was convicted on the latter charge and served three years in prison. He was also sentenced to two years in prison for possession and distribution of cocaine.

The Blazers were one of two teams, the other being the Detroit Wheels, to outright fold after 1974 with no direct replacement in their markets in 1975 (not counting teams that moved midseason). Only one expansion team would be added, with Norman Bevan buying the franchise rights and establishing a team in San Antonio. The Wings ended up displacing the San Antonio Toros, which had spent the previous eight years as one of the most successful minor professional football teams in the United States.

The new Wings were restocked with an expansion draft but retained 16 former Blazers, including running back Jim Strong and tight end Luther Palmer. Larry Grantham, a linebacker on the 1974 Blazers, retired but joined the Wings' coaching staff. The team's head coach was Perry Moss, a former head coach at Marshall and a former NFL assistant coach; Blazers coach Jack Pardee, who wanted nothing more to do with the WFL, returned to the NFL during the offseason.

Quarterback Johnnie Walton, a relic from the old Continental Football League who had spent most of the early 1970s bouncing around NFL practice squads, led the WFL in passing in 1975. The Wings held their home games at Alamo Stadium, which seated 25,000. San Antonio finished with a 7–6 record (winning all seven home games and losing all six road games) before the league folded on October 22, 1975.

=== 1975 regular season ===
Week	Date	Opponent	Result	Venue	Attendance	Source
1	July 26	Charlotte Hornets	W 27–10	Alamo Stadium	12,325	
2	August 2	Shreveport Steamer	W 19–3	Alamo Stadium	10,411	
3	August 9	Southern California Sun	W 54–22	Alamo Stadium	21,000	
4	August 16	at Charlotte Hornets	L 20–27	American Legion Memorial Stadium	8,447	
5	August 23	at Jacksonville Express	L 19–26 (OT)	Gator Bowl Stadium	16,133	
6	August 30	Portland Thunder	W 22–0	Alamo Stadium	12,197	
7	September 6	Southern California Sun	W 30–8	Alamo Stadium	10,470	
8	September 13	at Birmingham Vulcans	L 24–33	Legion Field	12,500	
9	September 21	Hawaiians	W 30–11	Alamo Stadium	10,871	
10	September 28	Memphis Grizzlies	W 25–17	Alamo Stadium	16,283	
11	October 4	at Philadelphia Bell	L 38–42	Franklin Field	2,357	
12	October 12	at Portland Thunder	L 25–28 (OT)	Civic Stadium	3,818	
13	October 19	at Shreveport Steamer	L 31–41	State Fair Stadium	8,500	
