= Joe Williams (fullback) =

American gridiron football player (1941–2015)

No. 22, 32, 15, 20
- Positions: Fullback, Defensive end

Personal information
- Born: March 16, 1941; Daisy, Georgia, U.S.
- Died: January 30, 2015 (aged 73); Berkeley Heights, New Jersey, U.S.
- Listed height: 5 ft 10 in (1.78 m)
- Listed weight: 205 lb (93 kg)

Career information
- High school: Rahway (NJ)
- College: Iowa
- NFL draft: 1963: 14th round, 194th overall pick

Career history
- Winnipeg Blue Bombers (1962, 1963); Ottawa Rough Riders (1963); Quebec/Toronto Rifles (1964–1966); Toronto Argonauts (1967); Chicago Owls (1968–1969); Jersey Tigers (1970)

Awards and highlights
- Grey Cup champion (1962)

Rudolph Joseph Williams (March 16, 1941 – January 30, 2015) was an American professional football player for the Winnipeg Blue Bombers, Ottawa Rough Riders and Toronto Argonauts in the Canadian Football League. He won the Grey Cup with Winnipeg in 1962. He played college football at the University of Iowa and also played for the Toronto Rifles of the Continental Football League. He died in 2015.

Raised in Rahway, New Jersey, Williams played prep football at Rahway High School.
