= Jim Strong (running back) =

American football player (1946–2019)

No. 28, 42
- Position: Running back

Personal information
- Born: December 12, 1946; San Antonio, Texas, U.S.
- Died: June 4, 2019 (aged 72)
- Listed height: 6 ft 1 in (1.85 m)
- Listed weight: 215 lb (98 kg)

Career information
- High school: Sam Houston (San Antonio)
- College: Houston
- NFL draft: 1970: 7th round, 165th overall pick

Career history
- San Francisco 49ers (1970); New Orleans Saints (1971–1972); Oakland Raiders (1973)*; Florida Blazers (1974); San Antonio Wings (1975)
- * Offseason or practice squad member only

Awards and highlights
- Second-team All-American (1969)

Career NFL statistics
- Rushing attempts: 134
- Rushing yards: 527
- Rushing TDs: 3
- Receptions: 30
- Receiving yards: 201
- Stats at Pro Football Reference

James Harold Strong Jr. (December 12, 1946 – June 4, 2019) was an American professional football running back who played three seasons in the National Football League (NFL) with the San Francisco 49ers and New Orleans Saints. He was selected by the 49ers in the seventh round of the 1970 NFL draft after playing college football for the Houston Cougars. He also played for the Florida Blazers and San Antonio Wings of the World Football League (WFL).

== Early life and college ==
James Harold Strong Jr. was born on December 12, 1946, in San Antonio, Texas. He attended Sam Houston High School in San Antonio.

Strong was a member of the Houston Cougars of the University of Houston from 1966 to 1969. He rushed 23 times for 105 yards and two touchdowns in 1967 while also catching one pass for five yards. In 1968, he recorded 85 carries for 538 yards and four touchdowns, and two receptions for 55 yards and one touchdown. As a senior in 1969, Strong rushed 190 times for 1,293 yards and 11 touchdowns while catching seven passes for 92 yards and one touchdown. His 1,293 rushing yards and 11 rushing touchdowns were both the most among independents that season. He was named a second-team All-American by the Associated Press in 1969.

== Professional career ==
Strong was selected by the San Francisco 49ers in the seventh round, with the 165th overall pick, of the 1970 NFL draft. He played in three games for the 49ers during the 1970 season, rushing two times for three yards. He was waived in 1971.

Strong was claimed off waivers by the New Orleans Saints on September 3, 1971. He appeared in all 14 games, starting seven, for the Saints in 1971, totaling 95 rushing attempts for 404 yards and three touchdowns, 16 receptions for 78 yards, nine kick returns for 134 yards, five fumbles, and two fumble recoveries. His 404 rushing yards led the team that year. He played in all 14 games for the second consecutive season, starting three, during the 1972 season, recording 37 carries for 120 yards, 14 catches for 123 yards, four kick returns for 53 yards, and one fumble.

On July 13, 1973, it was reported that Strong had been traded to the Oakland Raiders for an undisclosed draft pick. Strong was cut by the Raiders in late August 1973.

Strong signed with the Florida Blazers of the World Football League (WFL) on April 6, 1974. He played in all 20 games for the Blazers during the 1974 WFL season, rushing 183 times for 683 yards and four touchdowns while also catching 47 passes for 429 yards and two touchdowns. He became a free agent after the season.

Strong was signed by the San Antonio Wings of the WFL in 1975. He appeared in all 13 games for the Wings in 1975, recording 154 rushing attempts for 576 yards and one touchdown, and 33 receptions for 358 yards. The WFL folded during the middle of the 1975 season.

== Personal life ==
Strong died on June 4, 2019.
