= Perry Moss =

American football player, coach, and executive (1926–2014)

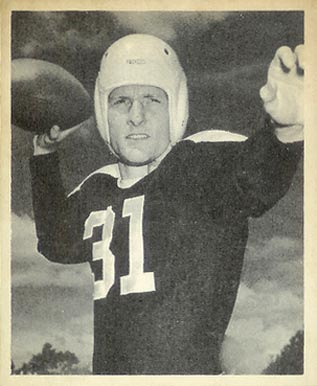
- Moss on a 1948 Bowman football card

No. 10
- Position: Quarterback

Personal information
- Born: August 4, 1926; Tulsa, Oklahoma, U.S.
- Died: August 7, 2014 (aged 88); Deltona, Florida, U.S.
- Listed height: 5 ft 10 in (1.78 m)
- Listed weight: 170 lb (77 kg)

Career information
- High school: Central (Tulsa)
- College: Tulsa; Illinois
- NFL draft: 1948: 13th round, 111th overall pick

Career history

Playing
- Green Bay Packers (1948)

Coaching
- Illinois (1949) Freshmen; Washington (1950–1951) Assistant; LSU (1952) Backfield; Miami (FL) (1955–1957) Backfield; Wisconsin (1958) Backfield; Florida State (1959) Head coach; Montreal Alouettes (1960–1962) Head coach; Charleston Rockets (1964–1965) Head coach; Orlando Panthers (1966–1967) Head coach; Marshall (1968) Head coach; Chicago Bears (1970–1973) Offensive coordinator; Green Bay Packers (1974) Quarterbacks; San Antonio Wings (1975) Head coach; Kentucky (1976–1978) Quarterbacks; Charlotte Chargers (1979) Head coach; Kentucky (1980–1981) Quarterbacks; Montreal Concordes (1982) Assistant; Buffalo Bills (1983–1984) Tight ends; Chicago Bruisers (1988) Head coach; Detroit Drive (1990) Head coach; Orlando Predators (1991–1997) Head coach; Baseball: Miami (FL) (1955) Head coach

Awards and highlights
- ArenaBowl champion (1990); 3× AFL Coach of the Year (1988, 1992, 1994); Arena Football Hall of Fame; Second-team All-Big Nine (1947); Nils V. "Swede" Nelson Award (1946)

Career NFL statistics
- Passing yards: 20
- TD–INT: 0–0
- Passer rating: 39.6
- Stats at Pro Football Reference

Head coaching record
- Regular season: College football: 4–15–1 (.225); AFL: 86–35–1 (.709); College baseball: 15–7–0 (.682)
- Coaching profile at Pro Football Reference

Perry Lee Moss (August 4, 1926 – August 7, 2014) was an American professional football player, coach, and executive. Moss played tailback at the University of Tulsa and quarterback at Illinois during the 1940s. As a Tulsa tailback, he was on the Orange Bowl team that beat Georgia Tech, 26–12, in the 1945 Orange Bowl and later as an Illinois T-quarterback, he directed a Rose Bowl team which routed UCLA, 45–14, in 1947. Moss served two years in the United States Air Force between his playing time at Tulsa and Illinois. At Illinois, he was named to All-Big Ten Conference and All-American teams. He was drafted in 1948 by the Green Bay Packers in the 13th round (111th pick overall) and played at the professional level for one year before returning to Illinois as an assistant. He started one game at quarterback for the Packers.

Moss served as head baseball coach and backfield coach at the University of Miami in 1955 and University of Wisconsin–Madison in 1958. In 1959, he was named as the head football coach and athletic director at Florida State, and compiled a 4–6 record and later at Marshall University in 1968 where he compiled an 0–9–1 record before resigning in the wake of NCAA recruiting violations. Twenty-eight members of the 1969 Thundering Herd presented a petition to West Virginia Governor Arch A. Moore Jr. to reinstate Moss for 1970, but the university instead named 1969 interim coach Rick Tolley, known as a brutal disciplinarian, to the post permanently. The decision undoubtedly saved Moss' life, for Tolley, 37 players and 37 others perished on November 14, 1970, in the crash of Southern Airways Flight 932 following Marshall's loss at East Carolina.

From 1960 through 1962 he was head coach of the Montreal Alouettes in the Canadian Football League. In the mid-1960s and again in the early 1980s he coached the Charleston Rockets of the semi-pro American Football Association. In the 1970s and early 1980s Moss was the offensive coordinator for the Chicago Bears, quarterbacks coach for the Green Bay Packers, had two stints as a position coach for the University of Kentucky under head coach Fran Curci, and was head coach of two teams in the American Football Association. In 1987, Moss was hired as the head coach of the Chicago Bruisers of the Arena Football League.

In 1991, he was named as first coach of the Orlando Predators of the Arena Football League and compiled a record of 59–25 before leaving the team in 1997. From 1986 to 1987, Moss was the Defensive Coordinator of the University of Central Florida, where he introduced the Chicago Bears '46' Defense, enabling UCF to record its first winning season in history. The following year, Moss's Defense led UCF to its first Division I-AA play-off appearance. Moss then resigned from UCF, and thereafter began coaching Arena Football.

Perry's son Les is also an American football coach.

Moss is a member of the Florida Sports Hall of Fame and Arena Football Hall of Fame. On August 7, 2014, Moss died at his home in DeBary, Florida, aged 88.

== Head coaching record ==
=== College football ===
Year	Team	Overall	Conference	Standing	Bowl/playoffs
Florida State Seminoles (Independent) (1959)
1959	Florida State	4–6			
Florida State:		4–6			
Marshall Thundering Herd (Mid-American Conference) (1968)
1968	Marshall	0–9–1	0–6	7th	
Marshall:		0–9–1	0–6		
Total:		4–15–1			
