= Mexico Golden Aztecs =

- Founded: 1969
- Folded: 1969
- League: Continental Football League
- Based in: Monterrey, Mexico
- Arena: Estadio Universitario
- Colors
- Owner: Red McCombs
- Championships: none

The Mexico Golden Aztecs were a professional American football team based in Monterrey, Mexico. During the team's brief existence it played in the Texas Division of the Continental Football League, and its home games were played at the Estadio Universitario. The team's only head coach was Duncan McCauley.

On July 26, 1969, the Golden Aztecs played the Chicago Owls in a preseason game that was the first professional American football game from a United States league played in Mexico. Citing a lack of fan support, team owner Red McCombs announced in September that he was pulling the then-undefeated team from Monterrey and seeking a move to Mexico City or another city that could support the team. The Golden Aztecs played their next four games on the road but could not come to an agreement with Estadio Azteca officials due to their insistence that tickets be priced at 38 cents.

The franchise's final game took place on September 18, 1969, and was a road win against the Dallas Rockets. On September 21 the franchise ceased operations and forfeited the remainder of their 1969 schedule.

== Season-by-season ==
	Year	League	W	L	T	Finish	Coach
Mexico Golden Aztecs	1969	COFL	2	6	0	3rd, Texas Division East	Duncan McCauley
