= Eugene Bombers =

Former professional football team

- Founded: 1966
- Folded: 1968
- League: Pacific Football League; Continental Football League
- Based in: Eugene, Oregon
- Arena: Bethel Park
- Colors: Blue and Gold
- Championships: none

The Eugene Bombers were a professional American football team based in Eugene, Oregon. The Bombers played their home games at Bethel Park in Eugene. The team was founded in 1966 as a member of the Pacific Football League. The Bombers qualified for the postseason in 1966 but opted to forfeit as they did not expect to draw enough spectators to meet the cost of playing. After one season in the Pacific League the Bombers moved to the Continental Football League's newly formed Pacific Division.

For both seasons, The Bombers were head coached by Jack Crabtree with Jack Morris acting as the Defensive Coordinator. The Bombers became inactive in 1968 due to the lack of a suitable stadium and never reactivated.

== Season-by-season ==
	Year	League	W	L	T	Finish	Coach
Eugene Bombers	1966	Pacific Football League	7	2	0	2nd	Jack Crabtree
Eugene Bombers	1967	Continental Football League	6	6	0	4th, Pacific Division	Jack Crabtree
