= Orange County Ramblers =

American professional football team

General information
- Founded: 1967
- Folded: 1969
- Stadium: Municipal Stadium, Santa Ana; Anaheim Stadium
- Headquartered: Santa Ana, California; Anaheim, California
- Colors: Seal brown, orange, and white

Personnel
- Owner: Charles G. Schlegal
- General manager: Jack Stovall
- Head coach: Homer Beatty

League / conference affiliations
- Continental Football League; Pacific

Championships
- Division championships: 0; 2

The Orange County Ramblers were a professional football team that competed in the Continental Football League from 1967 to 1968. The Ramblers played their home games in Santa Ana, California and Anaheim, California. The team was coached both seasons by Homer Beatty, who had won a small college national title at Santa Ana College in 1962.

== 1967 season ==
The Ramblers won the CoFL's Pacific Division with a 10-2 record, winning all six of their home contests. The first four Ramblers home games were held at Municipal Stadium in Santa Ana; the team's success, and the poor crowds in Santa Ana (12,201 total for the three known games) led the squad to move to Anaheim Stadium for their last two home games, which drew 20,396 fans. On December 10, 1967, Orange County hosted the league's championship game against the Orlando Panthers (11-3), in front of a crowd of 8,730 in Anaheim. Don Jonas, later a star in the Canadian Football League, spoiled things for the home team by throwing five touchdown passes, leading the Panthers to a 38-14 win.

Ten Ramblers made the CoFL Pacific Division All-Star Team: Bruce Smith, Split End; Mike Giers, Guard; Larry Metevia, Center; Rhome Nixon, Tight End; Jerry Otterson, Quarterback; Bob Jackson, Fullback; Rob Berger, Defensive End; Dick Degen, Linebacker; Ron Fowlkes and Darrel Hoover, Defensive Back.

== 1968 season ==
After drawing decent crowds in Anaheim late in the 1967 season, the Ramblers moved permanently to Anaheim Stadium in 1968. Again, they won all six of their home games en route to an 11-1 record and another Pacific Division title. The Ramblers traveled to Orlando on November 30, 1968, to play in their second consecutive championship game. Unfortunately for Orange County, the result was the same: the Panthers won the game and the CoFL title, this time by a score of 30-23. Attendance did not improve, however; the Ramblers drew just 10,053 fans to three home games at Anaheim Stadium; 7,138 total for two games played at smaller La Palma Stadium, also in Anaheim; and an estimated 5,000 to a pair of rescheduled games held at Orange Show Stadium in San Bernardino.

Tight End Rhome Nixon and Fullback Bob Jackson again made the league all-star team, as did defensive standouts Ron Fowlkes and Darrell Hoover. (The 1968 CoFL All-Star team was for the entire league; there were no separate all-star teams for the two divisions.)

== 1969 season ==
Despite their on-field success, the Ramblers' poor attendance caused the franchise to announce a full-time relocation to San Bernardino (where they had played two home games in 1968) for the 1969 season, but had their franchise revoked several weeks later for failing to confirm conditional approval.

In the summer of 1969, a new franchise was granted for Honolulu, the Hawaii Warriors, who were given claim to the Ramblers roster and also had partial first claim on players from the defunct Charleston Rockets and Oklahoma Thunderbirds franchises. Before the season began, however, the team moved to Portland, Oregon and were renamed the Loggers. After a dismal 3-9 season in the Northwest, the team folded, and the Continental League itself followed suit after the 1969 campaign.

== Skidoo ==
In the 1968 hippie comedy film, Skidoo, the Ramblers are credited with portraying the Green Bay Packers, then the reigning Super Bowl champions. In their brief scene, the team lines up in formation without any clothing other than their helmets and shoulder pads. Directed by Otto Preminger and featuring such actors as Jackie Gleason, Carol Channing and Mickey Rooney (and, in his final film appearance, Groucho Marx, playing a mob boss named God), the film was a notorious flop.
