= Lou Rymkus =

American football player and coach (1919–1998)

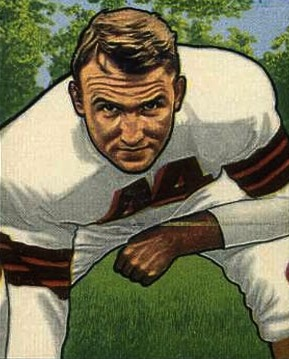
- Rymkus on a 1950 football card

No. 12, 44
- Position: Tackle

Personal information
- Born: November 6, 1919; Royalton, Illinois, U.S.
- Died: October 31, 1998 (aged 78); Houston, Texas, U.S.
- Listed height: 6 ft 4 in (1.93 m)
- Listed weight: 231 lb (105 kg)

Career information
- High school: Tilden (Chicago, Illinois)
- College: Notre Dame (1939–1942)
- NFL draft: 1943: 7th round, 60th overall pick

Career history

Playing
- Washington Redskins (1943); Cleveland Browns (1946–1951)

Coaching
- Indiana (1952) Offensive line coach; Calgary Stampeders (1953) Assistant coach; Green Bay Packers (1954–1957) Offensive line coach; Los Angeles Rams (1958–1959) Assistant coach; Houston Oilers (1960–1961) Head coach; Houston Oilers (1965) Offensive line coach; Detroit Lions (1966) Assistant coach; Akron Vulcans (1967) Head coach / General manager; Many (HS) (1968) Head coach; West Texas Rufneks (1969) Head coach; Baltimore Colts (1970) Offensive line coach

Awards and highlights
- As player: NFL champion (1950); 4× AAFC champion (1946–1949); 4× All-Pro (1946–1949); Second-team All-American (1942); As coach: 2× AFL champion (1960–1961); Super Bowl champion (V)

Career NFL/AAFC statistics
- Games started: 78
- Interceptions: 1
- Touchdowns: 2
- Stats at Pro Football Reference

Head coaching record
- Regular season: AFL: 11–7–1 (.605)
- Postseason: AFL: 1–0 (1.000)
- Career: AFL: 12–7–1 (.625)
- Coaching profile at Pro Football Reference

Louis Joseph "the Battler" Rymkus (November 6, 1919 – October 31, 1998) was an American professional football player and coach in the All-America Football Conference (AAFC), National Football League (NFL) and American Football League (AFL). Playing as a tackle for the Cleveland Browns in the AAFC and NFL in the late 1940s and early 1950s, Rymkus provided pass protection for quarterback Otto Graham as the team won five league championships. Following his playing career, Rymkus took a number of assistant coaching jobs before serving as the first head coach of the AFL's Houston Oilers in 1960. The team won the league's first championship, but Rymkus was fired by Oilers owner Bud Adams after a slow start in 1961.

Rymkus was born in Royalton, Illinois and grew up in Chicago. He was a star lineman in high school and won a football scholarship to attend the University of Notre Dame. At Notre Dame, he played on a 1941 team that went undefeated under head coach Frank Leahy. Rymkus was drafted by the NFL's Washington Redskins in 1943 and played one season for the team before joining the U.S. Marines during World War II. Following two years in the service, he signed with the Browns, where he spent the remainder of his playing career. Paul Brown, the Browns' first coach, called Rymkus "the best pass protector I've ever seen". His blocking was used by coaches to demonstrate proper form.

After Rymkus's brief stint coaching the Oilers, he held numerous football jobs, including as the coach of a high school team in Louisiana and an assistant with the Detroit Lions. Rymkus was a finalist for induction into the Pro Football Hall of Fame in 1988 but was not elected. In 2005, he was named to the Professional Football Researchers Association Hall of Very Good in the association's third HOVG class.

He died of a stroke in Houston, Texas, where he lived for most of his later life.

== Early life ==
Rymkus was born in Royalton, Illinois, the son of a Lithuanian immigrant coal miner who owned a small grocery store. After his father was shot and killed outside the grocery store, Rymkus and his family moved to the Back of the Yards neighborhood on Chicago's South Side. With family finances tight, he took a number of odd jobs, including working as a laborer and delivering newspapers and groceries. At the suggestion of a friend, Rymkus attended Tilden Tech, now known as Tilden High School, and began to display talent as a lineman on the school's football team. He blocked a kick and scored a touchdown in a game at Chicago's Soldier Field in 1936 against rival Austin High, a play he later said was the most memorable of his high school career. Rymkus won seven letters at Tilden playing on the football, track and wrestling teams. As a senior, he defeated Rudy Mucha to win the Chicago prep-school wrestling title.

== College and professional career ==
Rymkus's success in high school led to a scholarship to the University of Notre Dame, where he played from 1940 to 1942. He was known in college as a tough and durable tackle. In a 1941 game against Georgia Tech, Rymkus was elbowed in his upper lip. He left the game to get 14 stitches and returned to play in the 20–0 Notre Dame victory. Notre Dame went undefeated that season, coach Frank Leahy's first year at the school. During his junior year in 1942, Rymkus earned All-America honors, and in his final season at Notre Dame he was named the team's Most Valuable Player.

Rymkus was drafted by the National Football League's Washington Redskins in 1943, signing a contract giving him a $2,000 annual salary ($37,212 in 2025 dollars). Playing alongside quarterback Sammy Baugh, Rymkus returned a blocked punt for a touchdown in one game and an interception for a touchdown in the next game. After the 1943 season, Rymkus joined the U.S. Marines during World War II. He trained Navy recruits at Great Lakes Naval Station near Chicago in 1944 and 1945, and served at Pearl Harbor.

As the war wound down with Germany's surrender in mid-1945, Rymkus decided to join the new Cleveland Browns of the fledgling All-America Football Conference. Paul Brown, the coach of the new team, had met Rymkus at Great Lakes, where he coached the training station's military football squad. Brown offered Rymkus a $4,000 salary ($71,534 today), double what he made with the Redskins. George Preston Marshall, the owner of the Redskins, declined to match the offer and questioned the wisdom of joining a league that he thought had little chance of success competing against the more established NFL. Rymkus left his wife Betty in Nappanee, Indiana and hitchhiked to the Browns' training camp in Bowling Green, Ohio.

The Browns began play in 1946, and Rymkus soon became an anchor of the team's offensive and defensive lines. He solidified his reputation for toughness by playing more than 50 minutes per game that year despite a knee injury for which he needed surgery immediately after the season. On defense, Rymkus helped stop opponents' rushing attacks and disrupt the opposing quarterback. On offense, he helped protect quarterback Otto Graham and opened up running room for fullback Marion Motley. Graham led the AAFC in total passing yards over its four years of existence, while Motley led the league in rushing.

The Browns advanced to the AAFC championship in 1946, but a week before the game, Rymkus and teammates Jim Daniell and Mac Speedie were arrested and held for several hours after a confrontation with Cleveland police. The men were drinking as they waited to pick up Speedie's wife, who was coming on a plane from Utah. Daniell, who was driving the car the three men were in, honked at a police car that was blocking him, leading to an argument and the arrests. Rymkus and Speedie were charged with creating a disturbance and Daniell was charged with public intoxication. Daniell, the Browns' captain, was kicked off the team after the incident, but Rymkus and Speedie remained. The Browns went on to win the championship the following week, and Rymkus was named to a combined all-AAFC and NFL team.

Cleveland won the AAFC championship in each of the following three years before the league dissolved and the Browns were absorbed by the NFL. Rymkus was named to all-AAFC teams in 1947, 1948, and 1949. In 1948, when the Browns won all of their games, Brown took away Rymkus's defensive duties and made him exclusively an offensive tackle. That summer, he served as an umpire in the All-American Girls Professional Baseball League.

The Browns won the NFL championship in 1950, the team's first year in the league. Cleveland advanced to the championship the following year, but lost 24–17 to the Los Angeles Rams. Slowed by injuries to his elbow and knees, the 32-year-old Rymkus retired after the 1951 season, never having missed a game or a practice during his six years with the team. Brown called him "the best pass protector I've ever seen"; former teammates said his play was a model Cleveland coaches used to teach pass blocking to newcomers.

== Coaching career ==
Following his retirement in early 1952, Rymkus accepted a position as line coach at Indiana University, where his former Notre Dame teammate Bernie Crimmins had been appointed head coach. A year later, he headed north to work as an assistant under former Rams head coach Bob Snyder with the Calgary Stampeders of the Canadian Football League. In 1954, he returned to the NFL as a line coach for the Green Bay Packers. In four seasons there, he worked with future Hall of Famers Forrest Gregg and Jim Ringo.

On January 9, 1958, Rymkus accepted an assistant coaching position with the Rams. Rymkus had been mentioned as a possible candidate to replace Lisle Blackbourn as the head coach of the Packers, but was passed over for the job in favor of fellow assistant Ray McLean. He worked under Sid Gillman with the Rams for two seasons, and was seen as a potential head coach. The new American Football League's (AFL) Los Angeles Chargers considered him for the top spot in 1959; Leahy, Rymkus's former Notre Dame coach, served as the team's general manager. The Chargers selected Gillman instead, and Rymkus in January 1960 took the head coaching position of the AFL's Houston Oilers. Oilers owner Bud Adams signed him to a three-year contract paying $15,500 per year ($168,687 in 2025 dollars).

Rymkus hired a stable of assistant coaches including Wally Lemm, Walt Schlinkman, Fred Wallner and former Browns teammate Speedie. The team was led by quarterback George Blanda, running back Billy Cannon and wide receiver Charlie Hennigan. As the regular season progressed, Houston built up a 10–4 record, setting up a meeting with the Chargers in the AFL championship game. The Oilers had lost to the Chargers in a November 13 game dubbed the "Sawdust Game" because sawdust was spread over the muddy and wet field in Los Angeles, but they entered the championship a six-and-a-half point favorite. Before the game, Rymkus was named the AFL's coach of the year. The Oilers went on to beat Gillman's Chargers 24–16 in the championship game on January 1, 1961. To commemorate the victory, Rymkus ordered thousands of drinking glasses emblazoned with a picture of his face and gave them to friends.

The celebratory mood continued into the next preseason, when Adams sent the team for two weeks of training camp in Hawaii. Rymkus was upset by the distractions caused by the decision. "We found it hard to think football around the palm trees", he said. "A preseason camp has to be hard, and you have to work hard. You can't do it in a place like Hawaii." The team got off to a 1–3–1 start in 1961, and Adams fired him on October 14. Adams said the decision was "based on the conclusion the material on hand has not been used to its fullest potential". Wally Lemm was given the head coaching job, but the shake-up prompted Speedie to resign. Under Lemm, the Oilers regrouped to win their second consecutive title.

Rymkus left football after his firing and accepted a regional public relations position with the Los Angeles-based Global Marine Exploration Company. After more than three years out of the sport, he returned to coaching and the Oilers when former Redskins teammate Hugh Taylor hired him as the team's offensive line coach. Rymkus stayed with the team for the 1965 season, resigning in January 1966. Despite his short tenure with the Oilers, Rymkus was popular in Houston; over 250 people attended a dinner in his honor following his resignation.

Three weeks later, Rymkus and Baugh, who had worked with him on the Oilers' staff, were named assistant coaches for the Detroit Lions. When Harry Gilmer was fired as Lions' head coach after the 1966 NFL season, however, Rymkus was once again out of work. He got a job as an assistant for the Akron Vulcans of the Continental Football League and was appointed the team's head coach and general manager in 1967. Rymkus stayed in the position until the team folded later that year due to financial difficulties; the team's owner, Frank Hurn, ran out of money and stopped paying the Vulcans' bills.

Rymkus next took a steep pay cut to serve as head coach of Many High School in Many, Louisiana. The job, in rural west-central Louisiana, paid him only $9,200 a year ($85,177 in 2025) to coach football, teach three history classes and run the school's summer recreation program. Rymkus was drawn by the tough conditions the players endured; many of his athletes missed practice to work on family farms. The team failed to win a game in 1968, but Rymkus stayed connected to professional football as a scout with the Kansas City Chiefs on weekends.

In 1969, Rymkus left Many – he said he "couldn't afford it" – and began working as general manager of the Executive Health Club in Houston. Later that year, he raised money to organize a West Texas Rufneks team in the Continental Football League. After the Rufneks lost an exhibition game 31–0 to the visiting Omaha Mustangs, the board of directors of Professional Sports Inc. voted unanimously to remove him as head coach. Ted Dawson, who had been head coach and general manager of the Rufneks when the team was part of the Texas Football League in 1968, retook the position and completed the season in a tie with the Western Conference champion San Antonio Toros.

In early 1970, Rymkus applied for a job as the Browns' offensive line coach but did not get the position. Later that year, he returned to the NFL as an offensive line coach for the Baltimore Colts under Don McCafferty. After just three regular-season games, however, he was replaced by George Young and transferred to the team's scouting department. Rymkus received a championship ring that year when the Colts defeated the Dallas Cowboys in Super Bowl V.

During his coaching career, Rymkus was renowned for his strictness. While with the Oilers, he repeatedly threatened to whip his players. He could also be melodramatic. He once repeated a speech Leahy gave at Notre Dame before a practice in a blizzard. He told his players during a hot August in Houston to be "like the Great Northern Buffalo, whose coat is shaggy and whose muscles are strong. The Great Northern Buffalo sticks his head into the wind and braves the cold, not like the puny Southern Buffalo, who turns his back to the storm."

== Later life and death ==
Rymkus worked in the late 1970s for the Houston Astros in the group sales department. He went on to take a number of jobs outside of football, including selling cars in Houston, where he spent his remaining years. In 1988, he was among 15 finalists for induction into the Pro Football Hall of Fame but did not make the cut (among those finalists, Rymkus and Lee Roy Jordan are the only ones who did not eventually become elected into the Hall) He died of a stroke in a Houston hospice on October 31, 1998. He and his wife Betty had two children, twin boys named Pat and Mike.
