= Sacramento Capitols =

- Founded: 1967
- Folded: 1970
- League: Continental Football League
- Based in: Sacramento, California
- Arena: Hughes Stadium
- Championships: none

The Sacramento Capitols were a professional American football team based in Sacramento, California. Formed as the Sacramento Buccaneers, the team's inclusion in the Pacific Division of the Continental Football League was announced in May 1967. The franchise's first head coach was Don McCormick, formerly of the Pacific Tigers.

Less than two months into the 1967 season the Buccaneers' players threatened to quit after not receiving their pay for two games. The players agreed to stay on with a $75-per-game pay cut, but demanded more of a say in team affairs in return. McCormick and four of his assistants quit afterwards. Former Oakland Raiders player Joe Barbee was hired to coach the team on an interim basis.

The financially troubled franchise was purchased in March 1968 and later renamed to the Sacramento Capitols. Under new head coach George Porter the team improved to 5–7 in 1968 and then 8–4 in 1969. The team made the COFL playoffs for the first and only time in 1969, where they lost 31–0 to the Las Vegas Cowboys. In July 1970, with the future of the COFL in doubt, the Capitols folded after selling less than half of the 3,000 season tickets needed to remain viable.

== Season-by-season ==
	Year	League	W	L	T	Finish	Coach
Sacramento Buccaneers	1967	COFL	2	10	0	6th, Pacific Division	Don McCormick
Sacramento Capitols	1968	COFL	5	7	0	3rd, Pacific Division	George Porter
Sacramento Capitols	1969	COFL	8	4	0	2nd, Pacific Division	George Porter
