= Arkansas Diamonds (American football) =

- Founded: 1966
- Folded: 1970
- League: Continental Football League
- Based in: Little Rock, Arkansas
- Arena: War Memorial Stadium
- Colors
- Championships: 0

The Arkansas Diamonds were a professional American football team based in Little Rock, Arkansas. They began play in 1966 as an independent, semi-professional club until they joined the Continental Football League for its 1968 season. The COFL ceased operations after its 1969 season, and the Diamonds folded in March 1970.

== Season-by-season ==
	Year	League	W	L	T	Finish	Coach
Arkansas Diamonds	1968	Continental Football League	2	10	0	5th, Central Division	Tom Burke/Fred Williams
Arkansas Diamonds	1969	Continental Football League	5	7	0	5th, Atlantic Division	Fred Williams
