= United Football League (1961–1964) =

Defunct American professional football league (1961–1964)

- Sport: American football
- Founded: 1961
- Folded: 1964
- Commissioner: George T. Gareff
- Claim to fame: The first football league to operate teams in both the United States and Canada
- No. of teams: 8
- Country: United States; Canada
- Last champion: Canton Bulldogs
- Most titles: Wheeling Ironmen (2)
- Related competitions: American Football Conference, Continental Football League, Professional Football League of America

The United Football League was a professional American football minor league that operated between 1961 and 1964. It had eight teams, primarily based in the Midwestern United States.

The league was founded in 1961 as a minor league alternative to the National Football League (NFL) and American Football League (AFL). Based in the Midwest, it drew many of its players from the Big Ten college conference.

Among its more notable feats, it became the first football league to operate teams in both the United States and Canada when it launched the Quebec Rifles in 1964, and it revived the names of the Cleveland/Canton Bulldogs and Akron Pros, two early-era NFL teams.

After the league folded following the 1964 season, the more ambitious owners formed the new Continental Football League (COFL). The more conservative owners, who wanted to continue as a regional Midwestern bus league, broke away to form the Professional Football League of America (PFLA) in February 1965.

== History ==
=== 1961 season ===
- Columbus Colts 6–2–2
- Grand Rapids Blazers 6–3–1
- Indianapolis Warriors 6–3–1
- Cleveland Bulldogs 6–4–0
- Louisville Raiders 4–6–0
- Akron Pros 0–10–0

WESTERN DIVISION PLAY-OFF
Grand Rapids Blazers 24 Indianapolis Warriors 14
UNITED FOOTBALL LEAGUE CHAMPIONSHIP
Grand Rapids Blazers 20, Columbus Colts 7

=== 1962 season ===
- Grand Rapids Blazers 9–3–0
- Indianapolis Warriors 9–3–0
- Wheeling Ironmen 8–4–0
- Toledo Tornadoes 6–5–1
- Columbus Capitols 6–6–0
- Louisville Raiders 4–7–1
- Cleveland Bulldogs 4–8–0
- Chicago Bulls 1–11–0

WESTERN DIVISION PLAY-OFF
Grand Rapids Blazers 24, Indianapolis Warriors 20
UNITED FOOTBALL LEAGUE CHAMPIONSHIP
Wheeling Ironmen 30, Grand Rapids Blazers 21

=== 1963 season ===
- Wheeling Ironmen 12–1–0
- Toledo Tornadoes 10–3–0
- Cleveland Bulldogs 7–5–0
- Indianapolis Warriors 5–8–0
- Grand Rapids Blazers 4–9–0
- Syracuse Stormers 0–12–0

On November 28, 1963, the Syracuse Stormers played the Cleveland Bulldogs at MacArthur Stadium in a regular season game.

UNITED FOOTBALL LEAGUE CHAMPIONSHIP
Wheeling Ironmen 31, Toledo Tornadoes 21

=== 1964 season ===
- Canton Bulldogs 12–2–0
- Charleston (WV) Rockets 11–3–0
- Indianapolis Warriors 10–4–0
- Wheeling Ironmen 7–7–0
- Toledo Tornadoes 6–8–0
- Quebec Rifles 5–9–0
- Grand Rapids Blazers 5–9–0
- Joliet Explorers 0–14–0

UNITED FOOTBALL LEAGUE CHAMPIONSHIP
Canton Bulldogs 19, Indianapolis Warriors 14

== See also ==
- American Football Conference (1959–1961)
- Continental Football League
