= Toronto Rifles =

American football team in Canada (1964–67)

The Toronto Rifles were a minor-league professional American football team active between 1964 and 1967. It was based in Toronto, Ontario, Canada. The team's home fields were Maple Leaf Stadium (1965) and Varsity Stadium from 1966 to 1967. The team was owned by Montreal businessman Johnny Newman.

As the Quebec Rifles, the team was the first professional American football team to be based in Canada. It played the 1964 season in Montreal, Quebec, in the original United Football League. When the Continental Football League (COFL) was established for the 1965 season with former UFL teams, the Quebec Rifles were admitted and transferred to Toronto to become the Toronto Rifles due to the lack of a suitable facility in Montreal. The Rifles competed in the Continental League from 1965 to 1967, but the owners pulled out in the middle of their final season after having lost a reported $400,000 in their final full season. The league took over the club and planned to have it play all of its games on the road, but several weeks later the team folded after having played only four games.

The team finished second in the league in 1965, losing to the Charleston Rockets in the league championship. In 1967, however, the Canadian Football League's Toronto Argonauts signed away the Rifles' head coach, Leo Cahill, quarterback Tom Wilkinson and running back Joe Williams. Meanwhile, Alan Eagleson took over the franchise. The team declared bankruptcy four games into the 1967 season, and the league folded the franchise at the same time as the Akron Vulcans.

The Rifles had a Canadian-based rival, the Montreal Beavers, when in the Continental Football League.

== Seasons ==
Year	Wins	Losses	Ties	Points	OPP	Playoffs	Championships	Notes
1964	5	9	0			out of playoffs		as the Quebec Rifles of the UFL
1965	11	3	0	412	258	Lost league championship to Charleston Rockets	team moved to Toronto and first season in the COFL	
1966	9	5	0	344	280	lost East division playoffs to Philadelphia Bulldogs		
1967	1	3	0	39	52	failed to make playoffs		moved to Atlantic North division, team folds after four games into the regular season

Source: THE COFFIN CORNER: Vol. 10, No. 5 (1988) - The Continental Football League: A mini tragedy of five acts, Sarge Kennedy

== Personnel ==
=== Players ===
- Allen Ray Aldridge LB 1966
- Charlie Baillie 1964 - with the Quebec Rifles
- Robert Blakley RB 1965-1966
- Phil Chiarella LB 1964 - with the Quebec R
- Chuck Dickerson DT 1965
- Bob Kreasul DE
- Ed Harrington, DE
- John Henry Jackson, QB
- Monte Kiffin, D
- Dick Limerick Flanker
- Rich Lucka Guard
- Leon Mavity Safety
- Bob Vokey punter, receiver and safety 1964 - with the Quebec Rifles, now a golf club craftsman
- Ernie Wade Tackle
- Tom Wilkinson QB 1966
- Joe Williams RB

Source: THE COFFIN CORNER: Vol. 10, No. 5 (1988) - The Continental Football League: A mini tragedy of five acts, Sarge Kennedy

=== Head coaches ===
- 1964: Sam Etcheverry (former quarterback for the Montreal Alouettes and a member of the Canadian Football Hall of Fame; his nickname in his playing days was The Rifle)
- 1965-1966: Leo Cahill (also GM; future CFL coach with the Toronto Argos)
- 1967: Jackie Parker (former CFL player with the Toronto Argos and Edmonton Eskimos)
