= Charleston Rockets =

American football team

- Founded: 1964
- Folded: 1969
- League: United Football League, Continental Football League
- Based in: Charleston, West Virginia
- Arena: Laidley Field
- Colors
- Championships: 1 (1965)

The Charleston Rockets were a professional American football team based in Charleston, West Virginia. They began play in 1964 as a member of the United Football League, and became a charter franchise in the Continental Football League in 1965. In their first season in the COFL, the Rockets finished with a perfect 14–0 record and won the league championship over the Toronto Rifles, 24–7. After an ownership change in 1968, the team announced that it was suspending operations in January 1969. Its place in the league's lineup was replaced by the Jersey Jays, returning the CFL to North Jersey after the departure of the Newark Bears to Orlando three seasons prior.

== Season-by-season ==
	Year	League	W	L	T	Finish	Coach
Charleston Rockets	1964	United Football League	11	3	0	2nd, Western Division	Perry Moss
Charleston Rockets	1965	Continental Football League	14	0	0	1st, Western Division	Perry Moss
Charleston Rockets	1966	Continental Football League	10	4	0	2nd, Western Division	Ken Carpenter
Charleston Rockets	1967	Continental Football League	6	8	0	2nd, Atlantic South Division	Sam Fernandez
Charleston Rockets	1968	Continental Football League	8	3	0	3rd, Atlantic Division	Billy Ray Barnes
