= Wheeling Ironmen =

American football team

Wheeling/Ohio Valley Ironmen

General information
- Founded: 1962
- Folded: 1969
- Stadium: Wheeling Island Stadium
- Headquartered: Wheeling, West Virginia

Personnel
- Owner: Mike Valan

League / conference affiliations
- United Football League (1962–64); Continental Football League (1965–69)

Championships
- League championships: 0; 2 (1962, 1963)

The Wheeling Ironmen were a professional American football team based in Wheeling, West Virginia, and played their home games at Wheeling Island Stadium. The team began play in 1962 as a member of the United Football League, where they played for three seasons until that league dissolved. The Ironmen won the UFL championship during their first two seasons in the league.

Wheeling became a charter member of the new Continental Football League in 1965, along with four other former UFL teams. Financial difficulties prompted the team to file for bankruptcy in April 1968, and also vote to give up their COFL franchise. Later that month the team announced they would in fact stay in the league, and hold a fundraising drive. Prior to the start of the 1968 COFL season the team changed their name to the Ohio Valley Ironmen.

On December 15, 1969 the COFL revoked the Ironmen's franchise for failure to meet the league's financial obligations; the league itself collapsed a few months later.

== Ohio Valley Ironmen (2025) ==
A different Ohio Valley Ironmen assumed the name in the International Football Alliance 56 years later; Manny Matsakis, who had been a fan of the original Ironmen as a child, implied that he chose the Ironmen name in homage to the 1960s team. After the IFA imploded midseason, Matsakis became involved in reviving the Continental Football League brand. The Ironmen folded on June 19, 2026, following the loss of sponsor funding and persistent scheduling difficulties; opposing teams were unwilling to play against the Ironmen and suffer overwhelmingly lopsided losses against them.
