= Montreal Beavers =

Defunct American football team

- Founded: 1961
- Folded: 1968
- League: United Football League, Continental Football League
- Based in: Montreal, Quebec, Canada
- Arena: Beaver Stadium
- Championships: 1 (1964)

The Montreal Beavers were a professional American football team based in Montreal, Quebec, Canada. The franchise began as the Indianapolis Warriors of the United Football League in 1961, where they played for four seasons. During that time the Warriors made the UFL playoffs three times, and advanced to the league championship in 1964. The team moved to Fort Wayne, Indiana, United States, in January 1965, and became a charter member of the Continental Football League (CFL) when it was formed the next month.

Unable to find financial success in Indiana, team owner Al Savill sold the Warriors to a group from Montreal led by construction magnate, and former Montreal Alouette, Johnny Newman in March 1966. Led by former South Carolina head coach Marvin Bass, the Beavers finished with a 7–7 record in 1966 and a 4–8 mark in 1967. The team denied rumours of a sale in early 1968, but folded before the season began.

The Indianapolis Capitols were considered "an outgrowth" of the team when the expansion franchise was established in 1969 to play in the CFL.

== Season-by-season ==
Team name	Year	League	W	L	T	Finish	Coach
Indianapolis Warriors	1961	United Football League	6	3	1	2nd, Western Division	Gene Gedman
Indianapolis Warriors	1962	United Football League	9	3	0	2nd, Western Division	Ken Carpenter
Indianapolis Warriors	1963	United Football League	5	8	0	2nd, Western Division	Ray Nolting/Lynn Lynch/John Talley
Indianapolis Warriors	1964	United Football League	10	4	0	1st, Eastern Division	Ken Carpenter
Fort Wayne Warriors	1965	Continental Football League	8	6	0	2nd, Western Division	Ken Carpenter
Montreal Beavers	1966	Continental Football League	7	7	0	3rd, Western Division	Marvin Bass
Montreal Beavers	1967	Continental Football League	4	8	0	3rd, Atlantic North Division	Marvin Bass
