= Orlando Panthers =

Defunct American football team

- Founded: 1958
- Dissolved: 1971
- League: Eastern Football Conference; Atlantic Coast Football League; Continental Football League
- Team history: Franklin Miners (1958—61); Paterson Miners (1962); Newark Bears (1963–65); Orlando Panthers (1965–71)
- Based in: Orlando, Florida
- Arena: Tangerine Bowl
- Championships: 2 (ACFL); 2 (COFL)

The Orlando Panthers were a professional American football team based in Orlando, Florida. Founded in 1958 as the Franklin Miners, the team spent its first four years in the Eastern Football Conference, then three further years in the Atlantic Coast Football League (ACFL) before moving to the Continental Football League (COFL) in 1965. The franchise moved from Newark, New Jersey to Orlando in 1966 and found success on the field as the Panthers. However, while the team won the COFL championship twice they were plagued by financial difficulties. The team jumped back to the ACFL in 1970 but were suspended by the league after the season.

== History ==
=== Franklin ===
The Franklin Miners were originally established in 1958 as a member of the Eastern Football Conference; their head coach was eventual Hall of Famer Steve Van Buren.

=== Paterson ===
The Miners were charter members of the Atlantic Coast Football League upon its founding in 1962, relocating to Hinchliffe Stadium in Paterson, New Jersey and becoming the Paterson Miners in the process. In their first season in Paterson, the Miners won the ACFL championship against the Providence Steam Roller in front of 2,000 spectators at the indoor Atlantic City Convention Hall.

=== Newark ===
The following summer the Miners moved to Newark Schools Stadium in nearby Newark, New Jersey and were renamed as the Newark Bears. The Bears took their name from a team in the American Association football league in the late 1930s through 1941, itself a direct descendant from the Orange/Newark Tornadoes, a football club with roots dating to the 19th century and that had played two seasons in the NFL. (The ACFL had several ties to the old AA, including teams in Paterson and Newark, and the same President, Joe Rosentover.)

The Bears won the Southern Division and claimed the 1963 ACFL title by defeating the Springfield Acorns, 23–6. A few months later the team announced its interest in joining the American Football League; at the time, the New York metro area's existing AFL franchise, recently rechristened the Jets, was still on uncertain financial footing, but the Jets survived and the AFL ultimately rejected the Newark bid. Newark had another strong season in 1964, advancing to their third straight league championship. This time, however, they were defeated by the Boston Sweepers, 14–10.

In 1965 the Bears joined two other ACFL teams in a minor-league merger that led to the formation of the Continental Football League. Newark struggled during its first COFL season, placed fourth in their division and finished with a record of 5–9.

=== Orlando ===
During the subsequent offseason, team owner Sol Rosen sold his franchise to Tom Granatell, who moved the Bears to Orlando, Florida and renamed them as the Orlando Panthers. They signed a 10-year lease to play their home games at the Tangerine Bowl. The move to Orlando was somewhat of a coup, as there was already a team named the Orlando Panthers that had played in the Southern Professional Football League the year prior (having played as the Daytona Beach Thunderbirds from 1962 to 1964) and, due to the Southern league's folding, was seeking to join the Continental league; the Newark ownership group managed to secure the lease, and the previous Orlando owner died, apparently of a rage-induced apoplexy, immediately after the meeting. Van Buren was promoted to vice president and replaced as head coach by Perry Moss, who led the Charleston Rockets to the 1965 COFL title.

Over the next four seasons the Panthers were consistent winners, never finishing with fewer than 10 wins. The team, led by quarterback Don Jonas, appeared in the COFL championship game three consecutive seasons starting in 1966, winning two titles during that span. In 1966, the team lost the championship to the Philadelphia Bulldogs in sudden-death overtime, 20–17. In 1967, the Panthers won the title with a 38–14 win over the Orange County Ramblers. In 1968, they repeated the feat by defeating the Ramblers 30–23, though they had to enter the game by winning a playoff with the Indianapolis Capitols (which Orlando won 28–14). In 1969, however, Orlando and Indianapolis rematched in the semifinals, with the Capitols prevailing 27–7. Such was the team's prestige that in the 1969 offseason, the Panthers entered into a deal with the Florida Citrus Commission to put up $400,000 in salary if O. J. Simpson agreed to sign with the team; with his negotiations with the team that drafted him, the Buffalo Bills, stalled at the time, and the institution of the Common Draft prohibiting him from negotiating with other teams in the AFL or NFL, the Panthers were the highest-profile team able to give Simpson a counteroffer. Simpson ultimately achieved a contract agreement with the Bills.

With the future of the COFL in doubt after the 1969 season, Panthers general manager and president Elmer Cook announced his intention to found a new football league based in Florida, the Sunshine League. Within weeks of that announcement, the Panthers applied and were accepted for membership in the franchise original home, the ACFL. The team was in major financial trouble at the time, fueled by massive overspending, and a new consortium took over the money-bleeding franchise in the offseason. The new owners, who originally planned to rechristen the team as the Orlando Oranges but never did, planned to run the team on a much tighter financial budget.

The Panthers made headlines in 1970 with the signing of a holder named Patricia Palinkas, the first woman to play on a men's professional football team. Palinkas originally served as holder for her husband, Steve Palinkas, but he was cut prior to the regular season. Patricia made the team but was immediately suspended after missing an entire week of team activities due to her full-time teaching job and personal appearances.

Financial difficulties continued to plague the Panthers in 1970, culminating in players (including Palinkas) quitting over unpaid wages and a lawsuit from the ACFL over unpaid dues. The Panthers were suspended by the ACFL for the 1971 season and never played again. The rights to Orlando's players were granted to the Roanoke Buckskins in June.

== Season-by-season ==
	Year	League	W	L	T	Finish	Coach
Paterson Miners	1962	ACFL	8	1	0	1st, ACFL Champions	Sal Rosen
Newark Bears	1963	ACFL	11	1	0	1st, ACFL Champions	Steve Van Buren
Newark Bears	1964	ACFL	12	1	1	1st, ACFL Southern, lost final	Steve Van Buren
Newark Bears	1965	COFL	5	9	0	5th, COFL Atlantic	Steve Van Buren
Orlando Panthers	1966	COFL	12	2	0	2nd, COFL	Perry Moss
Orlando Panthers	1967	COFL	11	3	0	COFL Champions	Perry Moss
Orlando Panthers	1968	COFL	10	2	0	COFL Champions	Jim Garrett
Orlando Panthers	1969	COFL	10	2	0	Lost in COFL semifinals	Dick Pesonen
Orlando Panthers	1970	ACFL	4	8	0	5th place Southern Division	Paul Massey
