= Continental Football League =

Professional American football league (1965–1969)

- Sport: American football
- Founded: 1965
- Folded: 1969
- No. of teams: 22
- Countries: United States; Canada; Mexico
- Last champion: Indianapolis Capitols
- Most titles: Orlando Panthers (2)
- Related competitions: United Football League, North Pacific Football League, Professional Football League of America, Texas Football League, Trans-American Football League

The Continental Football League (COFL) was a professional American football minor league that operated in North America from 1965 through 1969. It was established following the collapse of the United Football League, and hoped to become the major force in professional football outside the National Football League (NFL) and the American Football League (AFL). It owed its name, at least in part, to the Continental League, a proposed third Major League Baseball organization that influenced MLB significantly, although never played a game.

Four Continental Football League contributors are in the Pro Football Hall of Fame, the most of any league not considered a major league: coach Bill Walsh, Doak Walker and Steve Van Buren (the last two were inducted as players but were coaches in this league), and quarterback Ken Stabler. Sam Wyche, Bob Kuechenberg, Garo Yepremian and Otis Sistrunk were among the other players and coaches who would later gain fame in the NFL, while a few others, such as Don Jonas and Tom Wilkinson, would emerge as stars in the Canadian Football League, and others such as Johnnie Walton would become fixtures in other professional leagues in the era.

The league capped salaries at $200 per player per week, but quarterbacks could make as much as $650 a week.

== History ==
=== 1965 season ===
The formation of the Continental Football League (COFL) was announced on February 6, 1965. The league was primarily formed by minor-league teams that had played in the United Football League and Atlantic Coast Football League.

A. B. "Happy" Chandler, former Kentucky governor, U.S. senator, and retired Major League Baseball commissioner, was named COFL commissioner on March 17, 1965.

The league originally adopted a "professional" appearance. Teams were sorted into two divisions and each team had a 36-man roster with a five-man "taxi" squad. The rules were primarily those of the NFL except that a "sudden death" overtime period was employed to break ties, which was not part of the NFL during the regular season at that time.

To reinforce an image of league autonomy, teams were restricted from loaning players to, or receiving optioned players from, the NFL or AFL.

The first COFL season opened with three games played on August 14, 1965. Before the season began, the Springfield, Massachusetts, franchise moved to Norfolk, Virginia. The Norfolk club went on to become the most successful team in the league at the box office and held several minor league attendance records throughout the 1960s and 1970s.

=== 1966 season ===
Eastern Division Western Division

Eastern Division

- Brooklyn Dodgers
- Hartford Charter Oaks
- Norfolk Neptunes
- Philadelphia Bulldogs
- Toronto Rifles

Western Division

- Charleston Rockets
- Montreal Beavers
- Orlando Panthers
- Richmond Rebels
- Wheeling Ironmen

In 1966, the league began abandoning the "league autonomy" posture by striving to establish working relationships with NFL and AFL clubs. Commissioner Chandler, charging that the league was altering the terms under which he had accepted the position, resigned on January 20, 1966. He was replaced by COFL Secretary Sol Rosen, owner of the Newark Bears. Rosen sold the Bears to Tom Granatell, who promptly moved the team to Orlando.

The league engaged in some unsuccessful preseason negotiations with the Empire Sports Network to obtain a television broadcasting agreement. However, it was able to get ABC to broadcast the championship game on the Wide World of Sports; ABC paid the league $500 for the rights to the game.

The Brooklyn Dodgers, although under the general managership of baseball Dodgers player Jackie Robinson, failed to attract at the gate. Part of the problem was that they were playing nowhere near Brooklyn: their home games were at Downing Stadium on Randall's Island.

Evidently, the Dodgers had trouble securing home dates at Downing; a season-ticket application showed only five home games in a fourteen-game schedule. In any event, small crowds (only 29,500 combined for four games, including 12,000 for an exhibition contest) caused the franchise to become a league-operated "road club" in October; one home game against Hartford was moved to Connecticut, and their final "home" contest was shifted to Memorial Stadium in Mount Vernon, New York.

Charleston's Coy Bacon, 1966 COFL All-Star end, went on to play for the NFL's Los Angeles Rams, San Diego Chargers, Cincinnati Bengals and Washington Redskins.

The league also established farm team relationships with semi-pro clubs (for instance, the Dodgers affiliated with the Liberty Football Conference's Long Island Jets in 1966).

x = Division Champion y = Clinched playoff berth

Eastern Division
Team	W	L	T	PCT	PF	PA
xy-Toronto Rifles	9	5	0	.643	344	280
y-Philadelphia Bulldogs	9	5	0	.643	410	355
Norfolk Neptunes	8	6	0	.571	297	294
Hartford Charter Oaks	6	8	0	.429	293	353
Brooklyn Dodgers	5	9	0	.357	296	359
Western Division
Team	W	L	T	PCT	PF	PA
xy-Orlando Panthers	12	2	0	.857	485	227
y-Charleston Rockets	10	4	0	.714	357	267
Montreal Beavers	7	7	0	.500	317	331
Richmond Rebels	4	10	0	.286	229	367
Wheeling Ironmen	0	14	0	.000	205	400

Home team in CAPITALS

Semifinals

- Philadelphia 31, TORONTO 14
- ORLANDO 31, Charleston 24

League Championship (December 4, 1966)

- PHILADELPHIA 20, Orlando 17 (OT)

=== 1967 season ===
Atlantic North Division Atlantic South Division Western Division

Atlantic North Division

- Akron Vulcans
- Hartford Charter Oaks
- Montreal Beavers
- Norfolk Neptunes
- Philadelphia Bulldogs
- Richmond Rebels
- Toronto Rifles

Atlantic South Division

- Charleston Rockets
- Orlando Panthers
- Wheeling Ironmen

Western Division

- Eugene Bombers
- Long Beach Admirals
- Orange County Ramblers (Anaheim, California)
- Sacramento Buccaneers
- San Jose Apaches
- Seattle Rangers
- Victoria Steelers

The COFL added a Pacific Division for the 1967 season, adding three teams from the Pacific Football League to its ranks - Eugene Bombers (Oregon), Seattle Rangers (Washington) and Victoria Steelers (British Columbia), while the rest of the division comprised from four minor-league teams in California. The Pacific Division was basically a league-within-a-league and played exclusively against other Pacific Division opponents. The remaining teams in the league split into an Atlantic North Division and an Atlantic South Division.

Two of the small western franchises, in Eugene, Oregon, and San Jose, California, left the league after the season, while the franchise in Long Beach only played one game before folding. The Toronto Rifles actually folded mid-season, under unusual circumstances: the Toronto Argonauts of the Canadian Football League raided the Rifles roster and signed away the Rifles head coach, starting quarterback and starting running back, leaving the team unable to continue.

The remnants of the Brooklyn Dodgers were sold to Frank Hurn, who moved the team to Akron, Ohio as the Akron Vulcans. Hurn used only $2,000 of his own money and $50,000 of Chicago Outfit funding to buy the team and swindled numerous businessmen into providing lavish benefits for his team for which he would never pay. Under Hurn, the team lost $100,000 after just three weeks of play, forcing his big-budget head coaches, Doak Walker and Lou Rymkus, to front their own money to keep the team afloat; Hurn never paid the either the coaches or players for their services, and the Wheeling Ironmen ended up paying the Vulcans' salaries for what would be the Vulcans' fourth and final game in order to avoid a strike. Hurn would later amass a long record of criminal activity after his time in Akron.

Such instability marked the season for the COFL, particularly because the league could not improve upon its overall "semi-pro" public image. Inability to establish working relationships with NFL and AFL teams was a contributing factor. The league's breakthrough television contract with the upstart United Network was another: the network ended up folding prior to the 1967 season it was supposed to broadcast, leaving the COFL without a television partner yet again.

The San Jose Apaches in 1967 were coached by Bill Walsh, who later achieved great success as the three-time Super Bowl-winning coach of the NFL's San Francisco 49ers.

W = Wins, L = Losses, T = Ties, PCT= Winning Percentage, PF= Points For, PA = Points Against

x = Division Champion

Atlantic North Division
Team	W	L	T	PCT	PF	PA
x-Norfolk Neptunes	11	3	0	.786	422	289
Hartford Charter Oaks	5	7	0	.417	211	260
Montreal Beavers	4	8	0	.333	175	278
Toronto Rifles	1	4	0	.250	39	52
Akron Vulcans	1	3	0	.250	59	84
Atlantic South Division
Team	W	L	T	PCT	PF	PA
x-Orlando Panthers	11	3	0	.786	422	290
Charleston Rockets	6	8	0	.429	292	224
Wheeling Ironmen	5	9	0	.357	252	395
Pacific Division
Team	W	L	T	PCT	PF	PA
x-Orange County Ramblers	10	2	0	.833	394	104
San Jose Apaches	8	4	0	.667	310	150
Seattle Rangers	7	6	0	.538	248	236
Eugene Bombers	6	6	0	.500	239	260
Victoria Steelers	4	8	0	.333	120	268
Sacramento Buccaneers	2	10	0	.167	110	352
Long Beach Admirals	0	1	0	.000	13	37

Home team in CAPITALS

Atlantic Playoff

- Orlando 21, NORFOLK 17

League Championship (December 10, 1967)

- Orlando 38, ORANGE COUNTY 14

=== 1968 season ===
Atlantic Division Central Division Pacific Division

Atlantic Division

- Alabama Hawks
- Charleston Rockets
- Michigan Arrows
- Norfolk Neptunes
- Ohio Valley Ironmen
- Orlando Panthers

Central Division

- Arkansas Diamonds
- Chicago Owls
- Indianapolis Capitols
- Oklahoma City Plainsmen
- Omaha Mustangs
- Quad Cities Raiders / Las Vegas Cowboys

Pacific Division

- Orange County Ramblers
- Sacramento Capitols
- Seattle Rangers
- Spokane Shockers

In February 1968, the COFL merged with the Professional Football League of America (PFLA), in order to expand into the midwestern United States. The Quad City Raiders franchise moved to become the Las Vegas Cowboys after losing their first two games.

Danny Hill succeeded Rosen as COFL commissioner. Hill established a weekly payroll ceiling of $200 per player and $5,000 per team.

Ken Stabler played two games for the Spokane Shockers in 1968. Stabler later became the Continental league's first Pro Football Hall of Fame inductee as a player through his work with the Oakland Raiders of the NFL.

The Michigan Arrows began their season with a soccer-style kicker named Garo Yepremian, who had played the previous season with the Detroit Lions but had found himself out of work because of military service. Yepremian later found Super Bowl fame in the NFL as a member of the Miami Dolphins.

On September 8, 1968, Glen Hepburn, a two-way player for the Omaha Mustangs, suffered an in-game injury from which he died four days later; it would be the only fatality in the league's history.

The Orange County Ramblers were featured in the 1968 film Skidoo, in a credited role as stand-ins for a nude Green Bay Packers team. The Ramblers offense is seen, from behind, wearing nothing but helmets, during a scene in which a security guard is hallucinating due to the effects of LSD.

W = Wins, L = Losses, T = Ties, PCT= Winning Percentage, PF= Points For, PA = Points Against

x = Division Champion

Atlantic Division
Team	W	L	T	PCT	PF	PA
x-Orlando Panthers	10	2	0	.833	378	160
Ohio Valley Ironmen	9	3	0	.750	388	257
Charleston Rockets	8	3	0	.727	287	180
Norfolk Neptunes	7	5	0	.583	361	222
Alabama Hawks	5	7	0	.417	264	233
Michigan Arrows	1	11	0	.083	130	418
Central Division
Team	W	L	T	PCT	PF	PA
x-Indianapolis Capitols	8	4	0	.667	300	169
Omaha Mustangs	7	5	0	.583	242	261
Chicago Owls	6	6	0	.500	284	241
Oklahoma City Plainsmen	5	6	0	.455	199	265
Arkansas Diamonds	2	10	0	.167	177	425
Quad City/Las Vegas	1	11	0	.083	120	409
Quad Cities Raiders**	0	2	0	.000	15	84
Pacific Division
Team	W	L	T	PCT	PF	PA
x-Orange County Ramblers	11	1	0	.917	331	146
Seattle Rangers	7	5	0	.583	302	206
Sacramento Capitols	5	7	0	.417	218	248
Spokane Shockers	3	9	0	.250	163	302

Home team in CAPITALS

Playoff

- ORLANDO 28, Indianapolis 14

League Championship (November 30, 1968)

- ORLANDO 30, Orange County 23

=== 1969 season ===
Jim Dunn replaced Hill as league commissioner for the 1969 season.

The league expanded into Texas by absorbing the Texas Football League, which also brought the first and, to date, only team from Mexico to play in a professional American football league, the Mexico Golden Aztecs (whose owner, Red McCombs, would later buy the NFL's Minnesota Vikings). Midway through the season, the Hawaii franchise moved to Portland, Oregon.

The COFL entered the 1969 season with high hopes. That optimism was exemplified by the Orlando Panthers' bidding for the services of the 1968 Heisman Trophy winner, halfback O. J. Simpson of the University of Southern California (USC). The Panthers made an offer of $400,000 (nearly double the entire team's salary) for Simpson to play for the Panthers if his negotiations with the Buffalo Bills fell through; they did not, and Simpson signed with Buffalo for the 1969 season.

COFL attendance averaged approximately 5,700 spectators per game (the top attended team, Norfolk, had 13,000), insufficient to offset the lack of a TV contract. These economics contributed to the ultimate demise of the league after the 1969 season. Plans for an interleague exhibition between the COFL champion Capitols and the Canadian Football League champion Ottawa Rough Riders had been laid, but the Rough Riders backed out.

The Alabama Hawks played a pre-season game against the NFL's Atlanta Falcons rookies, losing 55–0.

The Indianapolis Capitols featured a rookie quarterback named Johnnie Walton during the 1969 season. Walton would become a regular in second-tier professional football; after several failed attempts to get onto an NFL roster in the early 1970s, Walton got his break in the World Football League, starting for the San Antonio Wings in 1975. Walton would spend the 1976–79 seasons as an NFL backup, then came out of retirement in 1983 to lead the Boston Breakers of the United States Football League.

COFL's alum Don Jonas did not reach the NFL, but instead chose to play in Canada after the 1969 season. As Orlando Panthers quarterback, he played four seasons before joining the Winnipeg Blue Bombers of the Canadian Football League (CFL). Jonas led Orlando to the 1967 and 1968 COFL championships, and was named the league's Most Valuable Player for each season. He also paced the Panthers to the 1966 championship game, which they lost to Philadelphia in overtime; and to the COFL semifinal game in 1969. Don was inducted into the American Football Association's Semi Pro Hall of Fame in 1983. Many CFL teams used the COFL as a developmental league sending players that need time to improve their skills.

Obert "Butch" Logan, a receiver, defensive back and player-coach, played his penultimate season in professional football with the Continental league's San Antonio Toros. Logan is notable for being the last professional football player to wear the singular jersey number zero (two others, Ken Burrough and Jim Otto, would wear a double zero, 00, into the 1970s) until the number was re-legalized in 2023.

== The end of the CoFL ==
A number of franchises folded or defected during and after the conclusion of the 1969 season, making the end of the COFL all but inevitable.

- September 21, 1969: The Mexico Golden Aztecs ceased operations and forfeited the remainder of their 1969 schedule.
- December 15, 1969: The COFL revoked the franchises of the Chicago Owls, Ohio Valley Ironmen, and Omaha Mustangs for failure to meet the league's financial obligations.
- February 18, 1970: The Jersey Jays moved to the Atlantic Coast Football League (ACFL).
- February 22, 1970: The defending champion Orlando Panthers announced their departure from the league and the establishment of the "Sunshine League," a Florida-based loop. The Sunshine League never materialized.
- March 6, 1970: At the annual COFL owners meeting in Chicago, the defending champion Indianapolis Capitols and the Norfolk Neptunes announced their withdrawal from the league
- March 10, 1970, COFL commissioner James Dunn announced his resignation effective the end of that month. No replacement was ever found, and there was never any announcement of the league's cessation.
- March 11, 1970: The San Antonio Toros announced the formation of the Trans-American Football League, taking with them the Fort Worth Braves and Dallas Rockets. The TAFL initially planned to be a nationwide league with teams in various major markets; by the time it began play in fall 1970, this was not the case, and the Omaha Mustangs (the only TAFL team to play outside Texas) and Texarkana Titans had joined the league.
- March 27, 1970: The Arkansas Diamonds folded.
- April 4, 1970: The Indianapolis Capitols, Norfolk Neptunes and Orlando Panthers (now under new ownership) were accepted for membership by the ACFL for 1970.
- May 2, 1970: The ACFL held a dispersal draft of players from the Las Vegas Cowboys, Ohio Valley Ironmen, Arkansas Diamonds, Chicago Owls, Tri-City Apollos, and Alabama Hawks.
- July 2, 1970: The Sacramento Capitols folded after selling less than half of the 3,000 season tickets needed to remain viable. By this point, only Spokane, Portland and Seattle remained in the league. Spokane was, according to secondhand reports, ready to play, but there would not be enough teams to do so; Portland's failure to answer phone calls marked the effective end of the league.

== Championship games ==
Season	Date	Winning team	Score	Losing team	Venue	Attendance
1965	November 28, 1965	Charleston Rockets	24–7	Toronto Rifles	Laidley Field	7,105
1966	December 4, 1966	Philadelphia Bulldogs	20–17 (OT)	Orlando Panthers	Temple Stadium	5,226
1967	December 10, 1967	Orlando Panthers	38-14	Orange County Ramblers	Anaheim Stadium	8,730
1968	November 30, 1968	Orlando Panthers	30–23	Orange County Ramblers	Tangerine Bowl	10,134
1969	December 13, 1969	Indianapolis Capitols	44-38 (OT)	San Antonio Toros	Bush Stadium	7,019

== Notable people and achievements ==
=== Coach of the Year ===
- 1965: Perry Moss, Charleston Rockets
- 1966: Perry Moss, Indianapolis Capitols
- 1967: Gary Glick, Norfolk Neptunes & Homer Beatty, Orange County Ramblers
- 1968: Lou Blumbling, Ohio Valley Ironmen
- 1969: Ken Carpenter, Indianapolis Capitols

=== League MVP awards ===
- 1965: Bob Brodhead (QB), Philadelphia Bulldogs & Joe Williams (FB), Toronto Rifles
- 1966: Don Jonas (QB), Orlando Panthers
- 1967: Don Jonas (QB), Orlando Panthers & Bob Jackson (HB), Orange County Ramblers
- 1968: Don Jonas (QB), Orlando Panthers
- 1969: John Walton (QB), Indianapolis Capitols

=== Rookie of the Year ===
- 1966: Tom Wilkinson (QB), Toronto Rifles
- 1967: Fred Bristo (DB), Wheeling Ironmen
- 1968: Eugene Wren (HB), Indianapolis Capitols
- 1969: John Walton (QB), Indianapolis Capitols

=== Pro Football Hall of Fame alumni ===
- Bill Walsh, Coach, San Jose Apaches (1967)
- Ken Stabler, QB, Spokane Shockers (1968)
- Doak Walker*, Coach, Akron Vulcans (1967)
- Steve Van Buren*, Coach, Newark Bear ^{*} Inducted as a player

== Aftermath and successor leagues ==
When the CoFL disbanded after the 1969 season, its eastern teams merged back into the Atlantic Coast Football League and select constituent teams and conferences such as the Trans-American Football League continuing into the early 1970s.

In 2025, a new revival of the league was announced set to play in 2026, 61 years after the league's original debut. The new league is based in Wheeling, West Virginia, and is backed in part by Manny Matsakis, who had been a fan of the original league's Ohio Valley Ironmen and revived the brand as a team in the ill-fated International Football Alliance in 2025.

== See also ==
- United Football League
- North Pacific Football League
- Texas Football League
- Continental Football League (2026)
