= Hayseed Stephens =

American football player (1938–2003)

No. 12, 21
- Position: Quarterback

Personal information
- Born: October 30, 1938; Caps, Texas, U.S.
- Died: May 15, 2003 (aged 64)
- Listed height: 5 ft 11 in (1.80 m)
- Listed weight: 175 lb (79 kg)

Career information
- High school: Abilene (Abilene, Texas)
- College: Hardin–Simmons (1957–1960)
- NFL draft: 1961: undrafted

Career history
- Louisville Raiders (1961–1962); New York Titans (1962); Canton Bulldogs (1964)*; Sherman-Denison Jets (1966–1967); El Paso Jets (1968); West Texas Rufneks (1969)
- * Offseason or practice squad member only

Awards and highlights
- Sammy Baugh Trophy (1960)

Career NFL statistics
- Games played: 6
- Stats at Pro Football Reference

Ernest Harold "Hayseed" Stephens (October 30, 1938 – May 15, 2003) was an American professional football player, businessman, and evangelical preacher. He was a quarterback for one season with the New York Titans of the American Football League (AFL). He played college football at Hardin–Simmons University, where he won the Sammy Baugh Trophy in 1960. He also played in several football minor leagues. After his football career, Stephens traveled the world as an evangelical preacher and was made a prince by Zulu King Goodwill Zwelithini. Stephens also drilled for oil in Israel at the suggestion of prime minister Menachem Begin.

== Early life ==
Ernest Harold Stephens was born on October 30, 1938, in Caps, Texas. He attended Abilene High School in Abilene, Texas, where he helped the football team win state titles in 1955 and 1956. Stephens also helped them win the baseball state title in 1956 and 1957.

== College career ==
Stephens enrolled at Hardin–Simmons University to play college football. He played for the Hardin–Simmons Cowboys from 1957 to 1960. He completed one of three passes for nine yards and one interception in 1957. The next season, he totaled 68 completions on 132 passing attempts (51.5%) for 706 yards, three touchdowns, and 11 interceptions while also rushing for two touchdowns. Stephens recorded 69 completions on 136 attempts (50.7%) for 692 yards, five touchdowns, and nine interceptions during the 1959 season. As a senior in 1960, he completed 145 of 256 passes (56.6%) for 1,254 yards, three touchdowns, and 14 interceptions while scoring two rushing touchdowns. His 145 completions were the most in the country that year. However, the Cowboys finished with an 0–10 record, making Stephens the first player in college football history to lead the country in an offensive category while being on an all-losing team. He won the Sammy Baugh Trophy as the country's best college passer that season. Coincidentally, Sammy Baugh was Stephens' head coach at Hardin–Simmons from 1957 to 1959. Stephens played in the Copper Bowl All-Star game after his senior year. He was inducted into the Hardin–Simmons athletic hall of fame in 2005.

== Professional career ==
After going undrafted in the 1961 NFL draft, Stephens played for the Louisville Raiders of the United Football League (UFL) in 1961. He completed 101 of 226 passes (44.7%) for 1,123 yards, five touchdowns, and 13 interceptions for the Raiders during the 1961 season while also rushing 44 times for 94 yards and two touchdowns. The Raiders finished the year with a 4–6 record. He also played for the Raiders in 1962, recording 42 completions on 68 passing attempts (61.8%) for 411 yards, two touchdowns, and five interceptions.

On September 26, 1962, the New York Titans purchased Stephens from the Louisville Raiders. On October 4, it was reported that Stephens would serve as the backup quarterback for the Titans' next game behind new starter Ed Songin after previous starter Lee Grosscup suffered an injury. On October 21, Stephens, who had not even been on the field, was incorrectly ejected from a game against the Dallas Texans after his teammates convinced the referees that Stephens was involved in a fight. The Titans did this to save linebacker Jerry Fields from ejection as the team only had three linebackers left. Following the game, Stephens was not fined after it was determined that he was not involved in the fight. Overall, he played in six games for the Titans during the 1962 season, completing 15 of 22 passes (68.2%) for 123 yards while also rushing six times for 33 yards. He became a free agent after the season. Stephens did not play football anywhere in 1963 due to his wife and child being seriously injured in a car accident.

Stephens signed with the Canton Bulldogs of the UFL in 1964. However, he left the team on August 22, 1964, before the start of the season.

Stephens played for the Sherman-Denison Jets of the Texas Football League (TFL) in 1966, completing 51 of 76 passes (67.1%) for 648 yards, five touchdowns, and two interceptions. In 1967, he recorded 136 of 264 passes (51.5%) for 2,030 yards, 18 touchdowns, and 14 interceptions while also rushing for a touchdown. The Jets finished the season with a 5–9 record. He was the team's head coach for three of those games as well, accumulating an 0–3 record.

Stephens played for the El Paso Jets of the TFL in 1968 and threw two touchdowns. He was the head coach for 12 games as well, going 5–7.

He was a member of the West Texas Rufneks of the Continental Football League in 1969.

== Post-football career ==
In 1966, Stephens released two country music songs. He both made and lost millions in the oil industry after his football career. He became a Christian in 1978 and, along with his wife, founded the Living Way Ministries in 1980. He traveled the world as an evangelical preacher. In 2002, he reached 11 million people in Nigeria. Stephens also met several prime ministers during his travels and was made a prince by Zulu King Goodwill Zwelithini. At the suggestion of Israeli prime minister Menachem Begin, Stephens worked on a plan to extract oil in Israel for over 20 years, but it was not a success. Stephens died of a heart attack on May 15, 2003.
