= Chris Gilbert (American football) =

American football player (1946–2026)

Profile
- Position: HB

Personal information
- Born: October 16, 1946; Houston, Texas, U.S.
- Died: February 9, 2026 (aged 79); Houston, Texas, U.S.

Career information
- College: Texas
- NFL draft: 1969: 5th round, 130th overall pick

Career history
- Fort Worth Braves (1969)

Awards and highlights
- Consensus All-American (1968); Second-team All-American (1967); SWC Player of the Year (1968); 3× First-team All-SWC (1966, 1967, 1968); Southwest Conference Champion (1968); 1969 Cotton Bowl Classic Champion; 1966 Bluebonnet Bowl Champion
- College Football Hall of Fame

Chris Gilbert (October 16, 1946 – February 9, 2026) was an American college football player for the Texas Longhorns. He was selected by the New York Jets in the fifth round of the 1969 NFL/AFL draft. He played professionally for one season with the Fort Worth Braves of the Continental Football League in 1969.

Gilbert ran for 3,231 yards in 29 games at the University of Texas in 1966–68. He was the first player in NCAA history to record three 1,000-yard rushing seasons—rushing for 1,080 as a sophomore, 1,019 as a junior, 1,132 as a senior, averaging 5.4 yards per rushing attempt. He was All-Southwest Conference three times and consensus All-America in 1968. In his career, he returned 20 kickoffs, averaging 22.7 yards on each and scored 28 touchdowns in 29 games. He was co-captain of the 1968 Longhorn team that shared the SWC championship and finished 8th in Heisman voting that year. He was named the team MVP all three years he was on varsity.

He was chosen by the New York Jets in the fifth round of the 1969 NFL/AFL draft. He was signed and released the Jets that year without ever playing in the NFL. He instead chose to play in the Continental Football League in 1969 with the Fort Worth Braves because he still needed 12 hours of classwork to graduate and the Fort Worth location would make it easier to finish school at Texas (and by staying in school he could avoid being drafted and sent to Vietnam). That season he rushed for 381 yards on 101 attempts.

After a season in professional football, he went into business. With friend and Texas teammate Corby Robertson, a '67 All-America linebacker, he founded Camp Olympia in Trinity, TX and found success with the Gilbert Investment Company in Houston.

Gilbert was named to the All-Southwest team for era 1919-1969 by Football Writers Association of America; inducted into the University of Texas Hall of Honor in 1978, the Texas High School Football Hall of Fame in 1990 and the College Football Hall of Fame in 1999.

Gilbert died at a Houston hospital on February 9, 2026, at the age of 79.
