= San Antonio Toros =

Defunct minor league football team based in San Antonio, Texas

- Founded: 1967
- Folded: 1974
- League: Texas Football League (1967–1968); Continental Football League (1969); Trans-American Football League (1970–1971); Southwest Professional Football League (1972–1973); Mid-America Football League (1974)
- Based in: San Antonio, Texas
- Arena: Alamo Stadium; North East Stadium; Harlandale Memorial Stadium
- Championships: 5 (1967, 1968, 1970, 1971, 1972)

The San Antonio Toros were a professional minor league American football team based in San Antonio, Texas, that played from 1967 to 1973. The Toros were one of the most successful minor league teams in the southern United States, known for their strong fan support, high-scoring offenses, and multiple league championships across several regional circuits. The team finished with an all time record of 128–13.

During their existence players were making between $100 and $300 per game.

== History ==
The Toros were founded in 1967 and joined the Texas Football League (TFL), a Texas-based minor league that served as a springboard for players and coaches seeking entry into the National Football League (NFL) and American Football League (AFL). Its owner, Henry Clay Hight, built a strategy of hiring local players, running the team on a tight budget but consistently meeting the obligations he did incur on time, and rotating the season schedule around multiple San Antonio area high school stadiums to give different parts of the city an opportunity to see the team play (and to minimize schedule conflicts with the stadiums' primary tenants); his business model built a strong following, keeping the Toros alive in the notoriously unstable business of minor professional football. Coached initially by Duncan McCauley, the team quickly became a powerhouse, winning the TFL championship in their debut season in 1967.

In 1969, it was announced that the High-level Continental Football League was adding the entirety of the eight-team TFL to its ranks. The TFL joined as a separate entity and was placed into the new Texas Division (itself split into East and West). The TFL teams were mostly scheduled to play against each other but did also play interleague contests. The Toros would reach to CoFL final, but lost to the Indianapolis Capitols, 44–38 in overtime.

Following the dissolution of the COFL after the 1969 season, the Toros joined the regional Trans-American Football League (TAFL), competing against teams from Florida, Tennessee, and the Midwest. Under head coach George Pasterchick, the team continued its winning tradition, capturing consecutive league titles in 1970 and 1971.

In 1972, the TFL merged with other regional circuits to form the Southwest Professional Football League (SWPFL). The Toros participated in the league’s two seasons. The TAFL folded after the 1973 campaign, bringing an end to the Toros’ seven-year run as a pro team.

The Toros continued to exist into 1974 season and joined the semi-pro Mid-America Football League, and even playing an exhibition game against the Houston Oilers on July 16. Because of a players' strike, the Oilers played with an all-rookie roster, narrowly defeating the Toros 13–7 in a much more competitive match than most NFL vs. non-NFL matches were at the time. The arrival of the San Antonio Wings of the World Football League effectively ended the Toros' existence.

== Legacy ==
The San Antonio Toros were later inducted into the San Antonio Sports Hall of Fame in recognition of their championship history and contribution to professional football in Texas. The team’s success also laid the foundation for later pro and semi-pro efforts in the city.

Subsequent professional football teams to play in the San Antonio area included the WFL's Wings, the Charros of the American Football Association, the Gunslingers of the United States Football League, the Riders of the World League, the Texans of the Canadian Football League, and the Brahmas of the XFL and UFL.

In the 2020s, the name “San Antonio Toros” was revived for a new professional football team honoring the legacy of the original franchise, part of a league reviving the Continental Football League brand.

== Season-by-season ==
Season	League	Record	Finish	Playoffs	Notes
1967	Texas Football League	15-0	1st, Eastern Division	League champions	Defeated Tulsa Thunderbirds 27-7 for TFL title
1968	Texas Football League	12-1	1st, Western Division	League champions	Defeated Texarkana Titans 21-16 for TFL title
1969	Continental Football League	7-4	1st, Texas Division West	Lost in the finals to Indianapolis Capitols 38-44(OT)	
1970	Trans-American Football League	10–2	1st, South Division	League champions	Defeated Fort Worth Braves 21-17 for TAFL title
1971	Trans-American Football League	9–3	1st, South Division	League champions	Defeated Texarkana Titans 20-19 for TAFL title
1972	Southwest Professional Football League	8-0	1st	-	Declared League champions
1973	Southwest Professional Football League	6-2	2nd, Eastern Division	Lost in the finals to Oklahoma City Wranglers 16-19	League folded after season
1974	Mid-America Football League	??	??	??	Ceased operations after the season

== See also ==
- Continental Football League
- Texas Football League
- Trans-American Football League
