= Wayne Walker (kicker) =

American football player (born 1944)

No. 68, 15
- Positions: Punter, Placekicker

Personal information
- Born: October 14, 1944 (age 82); Shreveport, Louisiana, U.S.
- Listed height: 6 ft 2 in (1.88 m)
- Listed weight: 230 lb (104 kg)

Career information
- High school: Bossier (Bossier City, Louisiana)
- College: Northwestern State (1962–1965)
- AFL draft: 1966: 13th round, 115th overall pick

Career history
- Kansas City Chiefs (1966–1968); Houston Oilers (1968–1969); St. Louis Cardinals (1969)*; New Orleans Saints (1970)*; Texarkana Titans (1970)
- * Offseason or practice squad member only

Career statistics
- Field goals made: 8
- Field goals attempted: 16
- Field goal %: 50%
- Extra points made: 26
- Extra points attempted: 26
- Points: 50
- Longest field goal: 41
- Punts: 19
- Punting yards: 736
- Average punt: 38.7
- Stats at Pro Football Reference

Wayne Walker (born October 14, 1944) is an American former professional football punter and placekicker who played in the American Football League (AFL) with the Kansas City Chiefs and the Houston Oilers. He played college football for the Northwestern State Demons. Walker also had stints with the St. Louis Cardinals of the National Football League (NFL) and the Texarkana Titans of the Texas Football League (TFL).

== Early life ==
Walker was born on October 14, 1944, in Shreveport, Louisiana. He attended Bossier High School in Bossier City, Louisiana.

== College career ==
Walker played college football for the Northwestern State Demons from 1962 to 1965. He served as the team's primary punter from 1963 to 1965 and had an average punt of 42.6 yards in 1965, setting a school record.

== Professional career ==
=== Kansas City Chiefs ===
Walker was selected in the 13th round, with the 115th overall selection, by the Kansas City Chiefs in the 1966 AFL draft. To start the 1966 season, he was placed on practice squad. On October 7, Walker was released by the team.

Walker was re-signed by the Chiefs ahead of the 1967 season and played in four games at punter. He punted 19 times for 736 yards, an average of 38.7 yards per kick. On October 10, 1967, Walker was placed on waivers and subsequently signed to the practice squad. On August 14, 1968, he was waived again.

=== Houston Oilers ===
On August 26, 1968, Walker was signed by the Houston Oilers. On October 18, he was activated from the practice squad to make his first appearance as a placekicker for the team. Walker played in eight games and went 8 for 16 on fields goals with a long of 41 yards and 26 for 26 on extra points. On September 1, 1969, he was placed on waivers by the team.

=== St. Louis Cardinals ===
On September 5, 1969, Walker was signed by the St. Louis Cardinals of the National Football League (NFL). He was released by the team on September 10.

=== New Orleans Saints ===
On July 11, 1970, Walker was signed by the New Orleans Saints. On August 12, he was released by the team.

=== Texarkana Titans ===
in 1970, Walker played for the Texarkana Titans of the Texas Football League (TFL). He kicked four field goals worth a total of 16 points due to the rules of the TFL.
