= Tommy Boutwell =

American football player (born 1946)

No. 16
- Positions: Wide receiver, quarterback

Personal information
- Born: December 31, 1946 (age 79); Bluffton, Ohio, U.S.
- Listed height: 6 ft 2 in (1.88 m)
- Listed weight: 200 lb (91 kg)

Career information
- High school: Hattiesburg (Hattiesburg, Mississippi)
- College: Perkinston JC (1965–1966); Southern Miss (1967–1968)
- NFL draft: 1969: 13th round, 332nd overall pick

Career history
- Cleveland Browns (1969)*; Miami Dolphins (1969); Texarkana Titans (1970–1971)
- * Offseason or practice squad member only

Awards and highlights
- All-TAFL (1971)

Career AFL statistics
- Receptions: 4
- Receiving yards: 29
- Stats at Pro Football Reference

Thomas Mitchell Boutwell (born December 31, 1946) is an American former professional football player who was a wide receiver for one season with the Miami Dolphins of the American Football League (AFL). He was selected by the Cleveland Browns in the thirteenth round of the 1969 NFL/AFL draft. He played college football at Perkinston Junior College and the University of Southern Mississippi as a quarterback.

== Early life ==
Thomas Mitchell Boutwell was born on December 31, 1946, in Bluffton, Ohio. He attended Hattiesburg High School in Hattiesburg, Mississippi.

== College career ==
Boutwell played college football at Perkinston Junior College from 1965 to 1966 as a quarterback. He was also a third baseman on the baseball team. He was inducted into the school's athletics hall of fame in 2013.

Boutwell was then a two-year letterman for the Southern Miss Golden Eagles of the University of Southern Mississippi from 1967 to 1968. He completed 55 of 104 passes (52.9%) for 510 yards, two touchdowns, and five interceptions in 1967 while rushing for 270 yards and four touchdowns. During the 1968 season, Boutwell recorded 151 completions on 285 passing attempts (53.0%) for 1,583 yards, eight touchdowns and 15 interceptions, and 331 rushing yards for eight touchdowns.

== Professional career ==
Boutwell was selected by the Cleveland Browns in the 13th round, with the 332nd overall pick, of the 1969 NFL/AFL draft. He was released on July 23, 1969.

Boutwell signed with the Miami Dolphins on August 6, 1969. He played in five games for the Dolphins during the 1969 season, catching four passes for 29 yards. He was released in 1970.

Boutwell was signed by the Texarkana Titans of the Texas Football League on September 8, 1970, as a quarterback. He completed 151 of 263 passes (57.4%) for 2,086 yards and 25 touchdowns while also scoring one rushing touchdown. In 1971, he recorded 70 completions on 146 attempts (47.9%) for 960 yards, 15 touchdowns, and ten interceptions in the newly-renamed Trans-American Football League (TAFL) while also rushing for 55 yards and two touchdowns. Boutwell earned All-TAFL honors for his performance during the 1971 season. He was also the offensive backs/receivers coach for the Titans that same year.
