= Verret =

Verret is a surname. Notable people with the surname include:

- Claude Verret (1963–2025), Canadian ice hockey player
- Douglas P. Verret, American physicist and magazine editor
- Joe Verret (1945–2010), American communist

== See also ==
- Verret, New Brunswick, community in Canada
- Verrett (disambiguation)
