= M. C. Reynolds =

American football player (1935–1991)

No. 17, 14
- Position: Quarterback

Personal information
- Born: February 11, 1935; Mansfield, Louisiana, U.S.
- Died: September 8, 1991 (aged 56); Shreveport, Louisiana, U.S.
- Listed height: 6 ft 0 in (1.83 m)
- Listed weight: 193 lb (88 kg)

Career information
- College: LSU
- NFL draft: 1958: undrafted

Career history

Playing
- Chicago Cardinals (1958–1959); Washington Redskins (1960); Buffalo Bills (1961); Oakland Raiders (1962); Saskatchewan Roughriders (1963)

Coaching
- Texarkana Titans (1970) Assistant

Career NFL/AFL statistics
- Passing attempts: 450
- Passing completions: 222
- Completion percentage: 49.3%
- TD–INT: 17–28
- Passing yards: 2,932
- Passer rating: 57
- Stats at Pro Football Reference

Mack Charles Reynolds (February 11, 1935 – September 8, 1991) was an American professional football player who was a quarterback in the National Football League (NFL) for the Chicago Cardinals and Washington Redskins. Reynolds also played in the American Football League (AFL) for the Buffalo Bills and Oakland Raiders. In five seasons, he played 39 games and had 2,932 passing yards.

Reynolds played college football for the LSU Tigers.
