= Johnny Hatley =

American football player and rodeo performer (1930–2001)

No. 65, 67
- Positions: Guard, defensive tackle

Personal information
- Born: March 16, 1930; Lometa, Texas, U.S.
- Died: February 10, 2001 (aged 70); Albuquerque, New Mexico, U.S.
- Listed height: 6 ft 3 in (1.91 m)
- Listed weight: 249 lb (113 kg)

Career information
- High school: Uvalde (TX)
- College: Baylor; Corpus Christi; Southwest Texas JC; Del Mar; Sul Ross
- NFL draft: 1953: 16th round, 186th overall pick

Career history

Playing
- Chicago Bears (1953–1954); Chicago Cardinals (1954–1956); Philadelphia Eagles (1956)*; Eagle Rock Athletic Club (1959); Dallas Texans (1960)*; Denver Broncos (1960); New York Titans (1961)*; Odessa-Midland Comets (1966); Fort Worth Texans/Braves (1967–1968)
- * Offseason or practice squad member only

Coaching
- Odessa-Midland Comets (1966) Defensive coach; Fort Worth Texans/Braves (1967–1969) Head coach

Operations
- Odessa-Midland Comets (1966) President/General manager; Fort Worth Texans/Braves (1967-1969) General manager

Awards and highlights
- All-Lone Star Conference (1952); All-TFL (1966); Rodeo Hall of Fame (2004)

Career NFL/AFL statistics
- Games played: 48
- Games started: 45
- Fumble recoveries: 2
- Stats at Pro Football Reference

Johnny Ray Hatley (March 16, 1930 – February 10, 2001) was an American football player and coach, and rodeo performer. He played college football at Baylor, Corpus Christi, Southwest Texas JC and Sul Ross and was selected in the 16th round (186th overall) of the 1953 NFL draft by the Chicago Bears. He played one season with the Bears before being traded to the Chicago Cardinals, where he played for two seasons. Hatley was traded to the Philadelphia Eagles in 1956 but did not play. He then retired from football to become a rodeo performer, winning several competitions and placing thirteenth at the 1959 National Finals. Hatley returned to pro football in 1960, being signed by the Dallas Texans and later being traded to the Denver Broncos. In 1961, he briefly had a stint with the New York Titans. From 1966 to 1969, he was a player, coach, executive, and administrator in the Texas Football League (TFL) with the Odessa-Midland Comets and Fort Worth Texans/Braves. Hatley was inducted into the Rodeo Hall of Fame in 2004.

== Early life and education ==
Hatley was born on March 16, 1930, in Lometa, Texas. His parents moved to Uvalde, Texas, in 1933, where he grew up on the family ranch. Hatley attended Uvalde High School and was an all-around athlete, competing in track, baseball, basketball, and football. A March 1948 article in the Austin American-Statesman wrote "In many ways Hatley rates as the year's most phenomenal trackman. A 220-pound football player, Hatley also runs the 100 [metres] in 10.7 [seconds] and high jumps five feet, seven inches, in addition to his shot put duties, where he is a consistent 50-footer. Few men of his size can perform those feats." In May 1948, Hatley won the state high school shot put championship with a throw of 52 feet, five more than second place.

In July 1948, it was reported that Hatley had enrolled at Trinity University in San Antonio, Texas. However, Hatley ended up joining Baylor University in Waco, Texas. He played as a fullback for the freshman team that year and weighed 215 pounds. A November report in the Corpus Christi Caller-Times wrote that he "can, and has, played every position on the team."

In 1949, Hatley transferred to the University of Corpus Christi, but later left for Southwest Texas Junior College. At the end of the season, he was named honorable mention All-South Texas Conference at both guard and fullback. The next year, he joined the United States Marine Corps, serving with them until 1952.

In 1952, Hatley joined Del Mar College, but transferred before the season started to Sul Ross. An article in the San Angelo Standard-Times referred to him as a "240-pound behemoth." At the end of the year, Hatley was named All-Lone Star Conference and was one of three unanimous selections to the East–West Shrine Game.

== Professional football career ==
=== 1953–1956 ===
Hatley was selected in the 16th round (186th overall) 1953 NFL draft by the Chicago Bears. After joining the Bears, he "immediately attracted the attention of line coach Phil Handler because of his speed and agility" and was trained to be the team's left offensive guard. Backfield coach and Pro Football Hall of Famer Paddy Driscoll said of Hatley: "That guy can get out ahead of a halfback in interference better than any man I've seen lately." The Fort Worth Star-Telegram reported that in practice Hatley "has been impressive at guard." In the third exhibition, against the Pittsburgh Steelers, he got into a fight with punter Pat Brady and was ejected from the game. Hatley ended up playing in ten regular season games, nine as a starter, as the Bears finished with a record of 3–8–1, fourth place in the Western Conference. (Note: Pro Football Archives records zero starts.)

Hatley started the 1954 season with the Bears and was reported as "the sensation of the camp so far," having "won every sprint race to date" despite gaining 15 pounds. Shortly before the first game of the regular season, he was sent on waivers to the crosstown Chicago Cardinals. Overall, in 1954, Hatley played in twelve games and started between eight and eleven of them, as the Cardinals finished 2–10. He also made one fumble recovery and returned one kickoff for eleven yards. In 1955, he appeared in all twelve games and started eleven, as the Cardinals finished the season fourth in the Eastern Conference with a record of 4–7–1. He recorded one fumble recovery and returned two kickoffs for thirteen yards.

In July 1956, it was announced that Hatley had been traded to the Philadelphia Eagles for an undisclosed draft pick. He left the team shortly before the season started to become a full-time competitor in rodeo.

=== 1959–1961 ===
While in Dallas for the national rodeo finals in December 1959, Hatley agreed to return to professional football, signing a contract with the Dallas Texans in the newly formed American Football League (AFL). He played briefly for the semi-professional Eagle Rock Athletic Club before signing with Dallas. In August 1960, Hatley was traded to the Denver Broncos. In the home opener, a win against the Oakland Raiders, he recovered a fumble. The Broncos finished the season with a record of 4–9–1, with Hatley starting in all fourteen games.

In 1961, Hatley was signed by the New York Titans but was released at the roster cuts.

=== 1966–1969 ===
In 1966, Hatley became the defensive coach, general manager, president, and a player for the newly formed Odessa-Midland Comets of the Texas Football League (TFL). Despite being 36 years old, Hatley ended the season being named to the league's all-star team. In January 1967, he submitted an application for a TFL team in Fort Worth. The application was accepted, with the Fort Worth Texans being the team's name. Hatley was named head coach. In addition to serving as head coach, Hatley also played offensive tackle for the team. The season opener for Fort Worth was played against the Odessa-Midland Comets, his former team. The Texans finished the season with a record of 5–9.

In 1968, Hatley led Fort Worth (renamed the Braves that year) to a 10–2 record, placing second in the Western Division but narrowly missing the playoffs. The following year, Hatley retired from playing, at the age of 39, but continued as head coach and general manager. The 1969 Fort Worth team played in the Continental Football League (CoFL), and finished with a record of 5–7 in league play, third place in the Texas Division West. Hatley retired from coaching after the season.

== Rodeo career ==
Hatley became interested in rodeo when at Sul Ross and competed in the sport during the football off-season each year. In 1956, he quit football to rodeo full time. He said that year, "handling animals, even the bulls, isn't half as tough as playing football ... I've never gotten hurt in a professional rodeo, but in football, I'm always getting hurt." In the next years he won steer wrestling competitions in Odessa, El Paso, Uvalde, Pecos, and Waco, Texas; Palm Springs, California; Cheyenne, Wyoming; and Spokane, Washington. He placed sixth nationally in steer wrestling in 1957 and moved up to fifth in the following year. In 1959, he participated in the National Rodeo Finals and placed thirteenth. He competed only part-time in the 1960s and had his last rodeo in Cheyenne, Wyoming, in 1973.

== Later life and death ==
Hatley later was in the trucking business. He was inducted into the Texas Rodeo Cowboy Hall of Fame in 1998, which he described as one of the highlights of his life. Hatley died on February 10, 2001, in Albuquerque, New Mexico, at the age of 70. He was posthumously inducted into the Rodeo Hall of Fame in 2004.
