= Dennis Kemp =

American gridiron football player (born 1946)

No. 62, 73
- Positions: Offensive tackle, offensive guard

Personal information
- Born: March 21, 1946 (age 80); Santa Monica, California, U.S.
- Listed height: 6 ft 3 in (1.91 m)
- Listed weight: 250 lb (113 kg)

Career information
- College: Tulsa

Career history
- Fort Worth Braves (1970); Calgary Stampeders (1971); Detroit Wheels (1974)

Awards and highlights
- Grey Cup champion (1971)

Dennis Kemp (born March 21, 1946) is an American former professional football player who played for the Calgary Stampeders. He won the Grey Cup with Calgary in 1971. He played college football at the University of Tulsa.
