= 2024 CrossFit Games =

Athletic competition

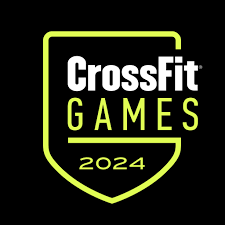
- Venue: Dickies Arena
- Location: Fort Worth, Texas
- Dates: August 9–August 11, 2024

Champions
- Men: (United States) James Sprague
- Women: (Australia) Tia-Clair Toomey
- Team: (Australia) Raw Iron CrossFit Mayhem Thunder

The 2024 CrossFit Games were the 18th edition of the premier competition in the sport of CrossFit, that was held from August 9 to August 11, 2024, in Fort Worth, Texas. The competition was won by James Sprague and Tia-Clair Toomey for the individuals, Raw Iron CrossFit Mayhem Thunder for the team. Competitors criticized the event organizers for resuming the event after one competitor died during the first day's events, with some withdrawing from the competition.

The CrossFit Games were held in the Dickies Arena in Fort Worth this season after 6 years in the Alliant Energy Center in Madison, Wisconsin. Due to the excessive summer heat in the Dallas-Fort Worth metroplex which may be unsuitable for competitive sport outdoors, most of the events were held indoors. There was no title sponsor for the Games for the first time since 2011, but there were two premier-level sponsors in GoRuck and Rogue Fitness. There was no change in the top prizes awarded this year; the total prize purse for the season amounted to over $3.3 million.

For the 2024 season, the finals of the Masters, Teens and Adaptive divisions were separated from the main CrossFit Games in Texas. Competitors 35 and over (Masters) competed in the Masters CrossFit Games, organized in association with the Legends Championship, held in Birmingham, Alabama. Competitors under 18 participated in the Teenage CrossFit Games, which was held in Three Rivers, Michigan and the Wings Event Center in Kalamazoo, Michigan. The adaptive athletes competed in the Adaptive CrossFit Games by WheelWOD from September 22–24, 2024 at the Henry B. González Convention Center in San Antonio, Texas. All the divisions increased the number of participants in their finals.

The first day of the main CrossFit Games, scheduled for August 8, 2024, was cancelled after Lazar Đukić drowned during the first event, an aquathlon. The competition resumed the following day after a consultation with the athletes, although a number of athletes including both 2023 champions Laura Horvath and Jeffrey Adler chose to withdraw from the competition. Other athletes also withdrew as the competition progressed.

== Qualifications ==
There are three qualification stages. As before, the CrossFit Games season starts with the Open, to be followed by the Quarterfinals and the Semi-finals. Some adjustments were made to the qualifying stages, in particular in the numbers of qualifiers from the Open and the Quarterfinals. All stages of the adaptive division this season including the Open were split off to be operated by WheelWOD, while the various stages for the age group divisions stayed the same apart from the finals. As in 2023, there are seven competition regions, and athletes must compete in their designated region in the semi-finals unless exemptions had first been obtained.

=== Open ===
The Open started on February 29, 2024, and continued for three weeks until 18 March. A workout was released every week for a total of 3 workouts. This year 343,528 athletes (344,396 including the adaptive divisions) registered for the Open, up over 6% from 2023. This year has the second highest number of returning athletes after 2018. The Open was won by Jonne Koski for the men and Mirjam von Rohr for the women.

=== Quarter-finals ===
The number of qualifiers for the quarterfinals in every region has been increased from 10% of the Open participants to 25% this season. The team quarterfinals took place on April 3–8, 2024, with the individual and age-group quarterfinals taking place on April 17–22, 2024. Competitors have more time (two days longer) than previous years to complete their workouts. Four individual workouts were released on April 17, and scores from the first two needed to be submitted by April 20, with the final two on April 22.

=== Semi-finals ===
The number of individual qualifiers for the semi-final for every region has been set at 40, meaning that the number of qualifiers for the North America and Europe regions has been reduced from 60 to 40, while the rest will be increased from 30 to 40. Similarly, the qualifiers for the team competition for every region has been set at 30. As in previous years, the semi-finals will be live competitions. Each semi-final will a pre-determined minimum number of qualifiers, but the final number that qualified from each semi-final for the Games will be determined by a strength-of-field calculation used in 2023. However, this year only those taking part in individual Semi-finals counted in the calculation, a change that favored smaller regions and resulted in fewer qualifying spots for North America and Europe.

== Qualifiers ==
=== Individuals ===
In 2024, a total of 40 men (23 consecutively) and a total of 40 women (19 consecutively) qualified for the finals to compete as individuals. The number of individual competitors would be cut during the competition, to 30 on Saturday afternoon, and 20 by Sunday morning.

Syndicate Crown – North America East (May 31 – June 2) Tennessee, United States		West Coast Classic – North America West (May 23–26) California, United States		French Throwdown – Europe (May 16–19) Lyon, France	
(Canada) Jeffrey Adler (United States) Dallin Pepper (Authorised Neutral Athletes) Roman Khrenikov (United States) Jayson Hopper (Canada) Samuel Cournoyer (United States) Jack Rozema (United States) Saxon Panchik (United States) Austin Hatfield (United States) Alexandre Caron (United States) Travis Mayer (United States) Luke Parker	(Australia) Tia-Clair Toomey-Orr (United States) Alexis Raptis (Canada) Emma Lawson (United States) Danielle Brandon (United States) Shelby Neal (United States) Haley Adams (United States) Brooke Wells (United States) Paige Semenza (Canada) Chloe Gauvin-David (United States) Caroline Stanley (United States) Lexi Neely	(United States) Justin Medeiros (Canada) Brent Fikowski (United States) James Sprague (Canada) Patrick Vellner (United States) Samuel Kwant (United States) Chris Ibarra (United States) Brandon Luckett (United States) Cole Sager (United States) Cole Greashaber	(United States) Abigail Domit (United States) Alex Gazan (United States) Arielle Lowen (Canada) Hattie Kanyo (Canada) Emily Rolfe (United States) Dani Speegle (United States) Bethany Flores (United States) Kyra Milligan	(Serbia) Lazar Đukić (Belgium) Jelle Hoste (Finland) Henrik Haapalainen (Spain) Aniol Ekai (Serbia) Luka Đukić (France) Victor Hoffer (Iceland) Björgvin Karl Guðmundsson (United Kingdom) Harry Lightfoot (Spain) Calum Clements (Germany) Moritz Fiebig	(Hungary) Laura Horvath (Poland) Gabriela Migała (Sweden) Emma Tall (Slovakia) Karin Freyová (United Kingdom) Aimee Cringle (France) Claudia Gluck (Netherlands) Linda Keesman (Italy) Elisa Fuliano (Republic of Ireland) Emma McQuaid (Norway) Jacqueline Dahlstrøm

Renegade Games – Africa (May 31 – June 2) Vanderbijlpark, South Africa		Torian Pro – Oceania (May 23–26) Brisbane, Australia		Copa Sur – South America (May 31 – June 2) Rio de Janeiro, Brazil		Far East Throwdown – Asia (May 16–19) Busan, South Korea	
(South Africa) Ruan Potgieter	(South Africa) Gemma Rader	(Australia) Ricky Garard (New Zealand) Bayley Martin (Australia) Jay Crouch (Australia) Peter Ellis	(Australia) Grace Walton (Australia) Madeline Sturt (Australia) Daisy McDonald (Australia) Georgia Pryer	(Brazil) Guilherme Malheiros (Brazil) Kalyan Souza (Brazil) Bruno Marins	(Brazil) Victoria Campos (Brazil) Julia Kato (Brazil) Andreia Pinheiro	(Authorised Neutral Athletes) ~~Ivan Kukartsev~~ (Note: Ivan Kukartsev failed the drug test.) (Authorised Neutral Athletes) Artur Semenov (Authorised Neutral Athletes) ~~Ilya Makarov~~ (Note: Ilya Makarov was a replacement for Ivan Kukartsev, but couldn't compete after his visa application was denied.)	(Turkey) Seher Kaya (South Korea) Seungyeon Choi (South Korea) Dawon Jung

Representation by Nation
- United States (29)
- Australia (8)
- Canada (8)
- Brazil (6)
- France (2)
- ANA (2)
- Serbia (2)
- Spain (2)
- South Africa (2)
- South Korea (2)
- United Kingdom (2)
- Belgium (1)
- Finland (1)
- Germany (1)
- Hungary (1)
- Iceland (1)
- Ireland (1)
- Italy (1)
- Netherlands (1)
- New Zealand (1)
- Norway (1)
- Poland (1)
- Sweden (1)
- Slovakia (1)
- Turkey (1)

=== Teams ===
In 2024, a total of 30 teams will qualify for the finals

Syndicate Crown – North America East (May 31 – June 2) Tennessee, United States	West Coast Classic – North America West (May 23–26) California, United States	French Throwdown – Europe (May 16–19) Lyon, France
(United States) Peak 360 (United States) Mayhem (United States) 1124 (United States) 8th Day (United States) Reignited (United States) Ocean State Surge (Canada) ~~Somos Mayhem~~ (Note: A member of Somos Mayhem failed the drug test and the team was replaced by CrossFit Levis Mayhem.) (United States) TT Endure (Canada) Levis Mayhem	(United States) Invictus (United States) Invictus Unconquerable (Mexico) ~~Complex Wodex~~ (Note: A member of Complex Wodex failed the drug test and Rhino CrossFit Dawgs was invited in their place.) (Mexico) Queretaro The W Pack (United States) Einhorn (United States) Kemah (United States) Overtake Team Density (United States) Rhino CrossFit Dawgs	(Sweden) Prestanda Kriger (Sweden) Walleye Orka (Norway) Oslo Kriger PSL (Norway) Oslo Kriger BLST (Denmark) Butcher's Lab Flæk (Norway) Oslo Kriger Rizz (Spain) The Progrm Motion (Sweden) Holistic

Renegade Games – Africa (May 31 – June 2) Gauteng, South Africa	Torian Pro – Oceania (May 23–26) Queensland, Australia	Copa Sur – South America (May 31 – June 2) Rio de Janeiro, Brazil	Far East Throwdown – Asia (May 16–19) Busan, South Korea
(South Africa) Tijger Valley Relentless	(Australia) Raw Iron Mayhem Thunder (Australia) Torian Mayhem (Australia) EFX	(Brazil) Vittoria Centr1 Movimento (Argentina) AR-1 Mayhem Unity	(Authorised Neutral Athletes) ~~KT Kolesnikov Team~~ (Note: The KT CrossFit Kolesnikov team could not compete due to visa being denied to a member of the team.) (Korea) Marvel Black Mayhem (Note: Marvel Black Mayhem replaced KT CrossFit Kolesnikov.)

Representation by Nation
- United States (13)
- Australia (3)
- Norway (3)
- Sweden (3)
- Mexico (1)
- Argentina (1)
- Brazil (1)
- Canada (1)
- Denmark (1)
- South Korea (1)
- South Africa (1)
- Spain (1)

== Individual competition ==
This is the first year the competition will be held at the Dickies Arena in Fort Worth. Events open to public will also be held on Friday night at the nearby Farrington Field. The cuts this year were to have been similar to the 2023 Games with a change, and the field will be cut to 30 athletes after the Saturday morning event, and to 20 by the end of the day. The cut was later changed in an announcement when competition resumed after Events 2 and 3 were cancelled, and only one cut was made with 30 athletes competing in the final day (around 16 male and female individual athletes had already withdrawn by Saturday). The events were broadcast on ESPN, ESPN2, and ESPN+ in the United States.

=== August 8, 2024 ===
==== Event 1: Lake Day ====
An aquathlon (run and swim) featuring a 3.5-mile run followed by an 800-metre swim. The event was held on Marine Creek Lake near the city of Fort Worth in the morning. Lazar Đukić, who was among the leaders in the swim, drowned. His body was later recovered and the following events for the day were canceled.

A meeting with all athletes and coaches as well as Đukić's brother Luka (who also competed) and other family members was held in the afternoon, and it was agreed to continue with the competition on Friday. However, Luka Đukić later revealed he had not agreed to the continuation of the competition as a tribute to Lazar as claimed by the leader of the sport team Dave Castro. A number of athletes, including both 2023 champions Laura Horvath and Jeffrey Adler as well as Luka Đukić, chose to withdraw from the competition.

#	Men	Time	Pts Total	Women	Time	Pts Total
1	(Belgium) Jelle Hoste	36:50.87	100	(Australia) Tia-Clair Toomey	38:06.88	100
2	(Canada) Brent Fikowski	37:55.41	97	(United States) Bethany Flores	39:36.72	97
3	(Authorised Neutral Athletes) Roman Khrennikov	38:10.72	94	(Canada) Emily Rolfe	40:21.26	94
4	(Australia) Ricky Garard	38:32.60	91	(Sweden) Emma Tall	40:35.46	91
5	(South Africa) Ruan Potgieter	38:42.20	88	(Australia) Grace Walton	40:58.27	88
6	(United States) Saxon Panchik	38:50.81	85	(Australia) Daisy McDonald	41:36.43	85
7	(United States) James Sprague	39:26.02	82	(United States) Haley Adams	41:41.34	82
8	(Iceland) Björgvin Karl Gudmundsson	39:29.86	79	(Slovakia) Karin Freyova	41:52.54	79
9	(United States) Chris Ibarra	39:32.16	76	(Hungary) Laura Horvath	41:57.36	76
10	(United States) Brandon Luckett	23:23	73	(United States) Danielle Brandon	42:13.70	73
11	(United States) Justin Medeiros	40:00.00	70	(United States) Paige Semenza	42:21.52	70
12	(United States) Cole Sager	40:04.91	67	(Poland) Gabriela Migała	42:41.69	67
13	(Australia) Jay Crouch	40:18.96	64	(Australia) Madeline Sturt	43:32.59	64
14	(United States) Luke Parker	40:19.00	61	(United States) Alexis Raptis]	43:53.50	61
15	(United States) Dallin Pepper	40:44.36	58	(Norway) Jacqueline Dahlstrom	44:02.95	58
16	(United States) Travis Mayer	40:47.88	55	(Brazil) Julia Kato	44:22.90	55
17	(Brazil) Bruno Marins	40:56.06	52	(South Africa) Gemma Rader	44:29.94	52
18	(Serbia) Luka Đukić	41:14.69	49	(Canada) Hattie Kanyo	44:30.69	49
19	(United States) Jayson Hopper	41:38.45	46	(Netherlands) Linda Keesman	44:58.56	46
20	(Finland) Henrik Haapalainen	41:42.40	43	(United States) Arielle Loewen	45:18.54	43
21	(Canada) Jeffrey Adler	41:48.65	40	(United Kingdom) Aimee Cringle	45:43.32	40
22	(Germany) Moritz Fiebig	42:00.44	37	(Turkey) Seher Kaya	45:58.65	37
23	(Brazil) Kalyan Souza	42:27.66	34	(Canada) Emma Lawson	46:04.27	34
24	(United Kingdom) Harry Lightfoot	42:32.75	32	(Canada) Chloe Gauvin-David	46:51.39	32
25	(United States) Samuel Kwant	42:35.20	30	(United States) Brooke Wells	46:55.98	30
26	(Australia) Peter Ellis	42:35.95	28	(United States) Shelby Neal	47:00.41	28
27	(Canada) Samuel Cournoyer	42:53.62	26	(United States) Caroline Stanley	47:21.16	26
28	(Spain) Aniol Ekai	42:57.40	24	(Italy) Elisa Fuliano	47:30.10	24
29	(Spain) Calum Clements	43:00.80	22	(Brazil) Andreia Pinheiro	47:30.55	22
30	(United States) Cole Greashaber	43:21.09	20	(Australia) Georgia Pryer	47:35.15	20
31	(United States) Austin Hatfield	44:01.15	18	(United States) Abigail Domit	47:52.17	18
32	(Authorised Neutral Athletes) Arthur Semenov	44:51.83	16	(South Korea) Seungyeon Choi	47:52.19	16
33	(Canada) Patrick Vellner	46:38.84	14	(France) Claudia Gluck	48:01.68	14
34	(Brazil) Guilherme Malheiros	47:27.42	12	(Republic of Ireland) Emma McQuaid	48:04.72	12
35	(Canada) Alexandre Caron	48:22.29	10	(Brazil) Victoria Campos	48:07.07	10
36	(New Zealand) Bayley Martin	51:04.60	8	(South Korea) Dawon Jung	48:45.06	8
37	(United States) Jack Rozema	52:54.55	6	(United States) Dani Speegle	48:50.86	6
38	(France) Victor Hoffer	WD	0	(United States) Alex Gazan	49:14.84	4
39	(Serbia) Lazar Đukić	–	—	(United States) Lexi Neely	51:03.95	2
40	–	–	—	(United States) Kyra Milligan	57:18.76	0

==== Canceled events ====
Following the fatality that took place during the Aquathlon, these two events were cancelled.

Hammer Down:

- 4 rounds for time:
- 50 hammer strikes (16/20-lb sledgehammer)
- 14 sandbag throws/get over the tire (70/100-lb sandbag)
- 5 tire flips (242 lb)

Amanda .45

Event 3 was to have been a repeat of the event that debuted in 2017, named for 2009 Games competitor Amanda Miller, who died of cancer in 2010. It was cancelled after the fatality during the aquathlon.

- 13-11-9-7-5 repetitions of muscle-ups and squat snatches for time.
- A 12-minute time cap would have been involved.

=== August 9, 2024 ===
The CrossFit Games began with a solemn memorial service in memory of the deceased competitor.

CrossFit also announced, because of event cancellations and withdrawals, only one cut would be implemented. The cut will be to the Top 30 individuals and Top 20 teams at the end of Saturday's competitions.

==== Event 2: Midline Climb ====
One round of (women/men):

- 50 deadlifts (155/225 lb)
- 5 rope climbs
- 30/50 SkiErg Calories
- 5 rope climbs
- 50 GHD sit-ups
- 5 rope climbs
- 50 GHD sit-ups
- 5 rope climbs
- 30/50 SkiErg Calories
- 5 rope climbs
- 50 deadlifts

#	Men	Time	Pts Total	Women	Time	Pts Total
1	(Canada) Patrick Vellner	14:14.05	114	(Australia) Tia-Clair Toomey	13:15.95	200
2	(United States) Jayson Hopper	14:16.68	143	(Australia) Madeline Sturt	13:43.21	161
3	(United States) Dallin Pepper	14:26.50	152	(United States) Haley Adams	13:56.77	176
4	(United States) Justin Medeiros	14:27.76	161	(Poland) Gabriela Migała	13:58.38	158
5	(Brazil) Kalyan Souza	14:48.68	122	(Sweden) Emma Tall	14:09.80	179
6	(United States) Samuel Kwant	15:03.60	115	(Canada) Emily Rolfe	15:05.50	179
7	(United States) James Sprague	15:05.66	164	(France) Claudia Gluck	15:12.86	96
8	(United States) Cole Greashaber	15:08.02	99	(United States) Arielle Loewen	15:13.71	122
9	(Belgium) Jelle Hoste	15:31.14	176	(United States) Alex Gazan	15:20.47	80
10	(Australia) Jay Crouch	15:49.98	137	(United Kingdom) Aimee Cringle	15:26.26	113
11	(Authorised Neutral Athletes) Roman Khrennikov	15:53.84	164	(United States) Bethany Flores	15:32.95	167
12	(Canada) Brent Fikowski	15:58.72	164	(Turkey) Seher Kaya	15:50.80	104
13	(Finland) Henrik Haapalainen	16:14.25	107	(United States) Paige Semenza	15:56.78	134
14	(United States) Saxon Panchik	16:31.97	146	(Netherlands) Linda Keesman	16:06.70	107
15	(United States) Chris Ibarra	16:34.95	134	(United States) Caroline Stanley	16:09.18	84
16	(Spain) Aniol Ekai	16:35.47	79	(United States) Brooke Wells	16:12.77	85
17	(Iceland) Björgvin Karl Gudmundsson	16:53.39	131	(Australia) Grace Walton	16:19.73	140
18	(Australia) Ricky Garard	16:55.96	140	(United States) Dani Speegle	16:19.90	55
19	(Canada) Alexandre Caron	16:59.55	56	(Republic of Ireland) Emma McQuaid	16:22.81	58
20	(United Kingdom) Harry Lightfoot	17:07.43	75	(United States) Abigail Domit	16:24.13	61
21	(United States) Cole Sager	17:19.18	107	(Canada) Emma Lawson	16:30.94	74
22	(Spain) Calum Clements	17:24.01	59	(Norway) Jacqueline Dahlstrøm	16:36.63	95
23	(United States) Travis Mayer	17:24.83	89	(South Korea) Seungyeon Choi	16:58.29	50
24	(United States) Jack Rozema	17:29.21	38	(Canada) Hattie Kanyo	16:59.11	81
25	(Australia) Peter Ellis	17:32.08	58	(South Africa) Gemma Rader	17:06.06	82
26	(New Zealand) Bayley Martin	17:45.96	36	(United States) Alexis Raptis]	17:13.80	89
27	(United States) Luke Parker	17:56.00	87	(Canada) Chloe Gauvin-David	17:30.57	58
28	(Germany) Moritz Fiebig	18:05.00	61	(United States) Shelby Neal	17:37.24	52
29	(Authorised Neutral Athletes) Arthur Semenov	18:27.36	38	(United States) Kyra Milligan	17:40.05	22
30	(Brazil) Guilherme Malheiros	18:50.28	32	(Australia) Georgia Pryer	17:49.32	40
31	(Brazil) Bruno Marins	19:08.68	70	(South Korea) Dawon Jung	17:50.08	26
32	(United States) Austin Hatfield	19:10.62	34	(Brazil) Andreia Pinheiro	17:51.05	38
33	(United States) Brandon Luckett	19:45.11	87	(Australia) Daisy McDonald	17:52.08	99
34	(Canada) Samuel Cournoyer	19:52.02	38	(United States) Lexi Neely	18:04.52	14
35	(South Africa) Ruan Potgieter	19:58.37	98	(Italy) Elisa Fuliano	18:10.00	34
36	(Canada) Jeffrey Adler	DNS	40	(Brazil) Julia Kato	18:12.93	63
37	(Serbia) Luka Đukić	DNS	49	(United States) Danielle Brandon	18:26.67	79
38	(France) Victor Hoffer	WD	0	(Brazil) Victoria Campos	19:18.97	14
	–	–	—	(Slovakia) Karin Freyová	DNS	79
	(Serbia) Lazar Đukić	–	—	(Hungary) Laura Horvath	DNS	76

==== Event 3: Firestorm ====
Three rounds for time of (women/men):

- Echo-bike calories (11/15)
- 11 burpees over barricade

#	Men	Time	Pts Total	Women	Time	Pts Total
1	(United States) Jayson Hopper	02:32.48	243	(Australia) Grace Walton	03:03.59	240
2	(United States) Dallin Pepper	02:37.48	249	(United States) Bethany Flores	03:09.07	264
3	(Canada) Patrick Vellner	02:41.54	208	(United States) Alex Gazan	03:11.20	174
4	(United States) James Sprague	02:42.10	255	(United States) Danielle Brandon	03:13.68	170
5	(United States) Samuel Kwant	02:45.07	203	(Canada) Emily Rolfe	03:14.49	267
6	(United States) Brandon Luckett	02:49.25	172	(Poland) Gabriela Migała	03:15.08	243
7	(United Kingdom) Harry Lightfoot	02:49.91	157	(Australia) Tia-Clair Toomey	03:15.66	282
8	(Authorised Neutral Athletes) Roman Khrennikov	02:50.82	243	(United States) Haley Adams	03:16.76	255
9	(Canada) Brent Fikowski	02:50.97	240	(Canada) Emma Lawson	03:17.06	150
10	(Finland) Henrik Haapalainen	02:52.80	180	(United Kingdom) Aimee Cringle	3:20.28	186
11	(United States) Cole Greashaber	02:52.95	169	(France) Claudia Gluck	03:21.87	166
12	(Australia) Jay Crouch	02:53.42	204	(Canada) Hattie Kanyo	03:25.14	148
13	(Canada) Alexandre Caron	02:54.03	120	(United States) Dani Speegle	03:25.43	119
14	(Australia) Ricky Garard	02:54.04	201	(United States) Abigail Domit	03:25.60	122
15	(United States) Travis Mayer	02:55.41	147	(South Korea) Seungyeon Choi	03:25.72	108
16	(Brazil) Kalyan Souza	02:57.36	177	(United States) Shelby Neal	03:26.68	107
17	(Belgium) Jelle Hoste	02:57.91	228	(United States) Caroline Stanley	03:28.35	136
18	(Spain) Aniol Ekai	02:59.03	128	(United States) Paige Semenza	03:29.47	183
19	(Spain) Calum Clements	03:02.54	105	(United States) Alexis Raptis	03:30.16	135
20	(Brazil) Bruno Marins	03:02.78	113	(Brazil) Julia Kato	03:30.26	106
21	(United States) Cole Sager	03:03.42	147	(Australia) Daisy McDonald	03:31.32	139
22	(United States) Luke Parker	03:03.57	124	(Australia) Madeline Sturt	03:30.26	198
23	(United States) Chris Ibarra	03:06.50	168	(Brazil) Andreia Pinheiro	03:31.69	72
24	(New Zealand) Bayley Martin	03:07.27	68	(United States) Arielle Loewen	03:32.44	154
25	(United States) Jack Rozema	03:07.66	68	(Netherlands) Linda Keesman	03:35.10	137
26	(United States) Justin Medeiros	03:12.93	189	(United States) Brooke Wells	03:37.69	113
27	(United States) Austin Hatfield	03:13.31	60	(Norway) Jacqueline Dahlstrøm	03:39.96	121
28	(United States) Saxon Panchik	03:14.20	170	(Turkey) Seher Kaya	03:40.10	128
29	(Australia) Peter Ellis	03:14.37	80	(Republic of Ireland) Emma McQuaid	03:40.81	80
30	(Iceland) Björgvin Karl Gudmundsson	03:14.70	151	(Australia) Georgia Pryer	03:42.97	60
31	(Germany) Moritz Fiebig	03:17.23	79	(South Korea) Dawon Jung	03:47.27	44
32	(Authorised Neutral Athletes) Arthur Semenov	03:20.63	54	(United States) Lexi Neely	03:47.30	30
33	(Brazil) Guilherme Malheiros	03:30.94	46	(United States) Kyra Milligan	03:47.51	36
34	(South Africa) Ruan Potgieter	03:43.19	110	(South Africa) Gemma Rader	03:54.89	94
35	(Canada) Samuel Cournoyer	–	38	(Canada) Chloe Gauvin-David	04:03.51	68
36	(Canada) Jeffrey Adler	DNS	40	(Italy) Elisa Fuliano	04:27.17	42
	(Serbia) Luka Đukić	DNS	49	(Brazil) Victoria Campos	DNS	14
	(France) Victor Hoffer	WD	0	(Sweden) Emma Tall	DNS	179
	–	–	—	(Slovakia) Karin Freyová	DNS	79
	(Serbia) Lazar Đukić	–	—	(Hungary) Laura Horvath	DNS	76

==== Event 4: Track and Field ====
Part 1

- 1,600-meter run

Part 2

At the 12-minute mark (women/men):

- 50-yard sprint
- 50-yard bag carry (70/100 lb)
- 75-yard sprint
- 75-yard bag carry
- 100-yard sprint

The two parts were scored separately, and the rankings from the two parts are then combined to give the final ranking for the event.

#	Men	Time	Pts Total	Women	Time	Pts Total
1	(Australia) Ricky Garard	1 pt	301	(Australia) Tia-Clair Toomey	1 pt	382
2	(United States) Luke Parker	2 pt	221	(United States) Haley Adams	2 pt	352
3	(Authorised Neutral Athletes) Roman Khrennikov	3 pt	337	(United Kingdom) Aimee Cringle	3 pt	280
4	(United States) James Sprague	4 pt	346	(Poland) Gabriela Migała	4 pt	334
5	(Canada) Patrick Vellner	5 pt	296	(United States) Paige Semenza	5 pt	271
6	(Australia) Jay Crouch	6 pt	289	(Canada) Emily Rolfe	6 pt	352
7	(Canada) Brent Fikowski	7 pt	322	(United States) Danielle Brandon	7 pt	252
8	(United States) Samuel Kwant	8 pt	282	(Canada) Hattie Kanyo	8 pt	227
9	(Belgium) Jelle Hoste	9 pt	304	(United States) Bethany Flores	9 pt	340
10	(United States) Travis Mayer	10 pt	220	(United States) Brooke Wells	10 pt	186
11	(Brazil) Kalyan Souza	11 pt	247	(Australia) Madeline Sturt	11 pt	268
12	(United States) Jayson Hopper	12 pt	310	(Australia) Georgia Pryer	12 pt	127
13	(United States) Saxon Panchik	13 pt	234	(Canada) Emma Lawson	13 pt	214
14	(United States) Chris Ibarra	14 pt	229	(France) Claudia Gluck	14 pt	227
15	(Spain) Aniol Ekai	15 pt	186	(United States) Alexis Raptis	15 pt	193
16	(Finland) Henrik Haapalainen	16 pt	235	(Turkey) Seher Kaya	16 pt	183
17	(Canada) Alexandre Caron	17 pt	172	(Canada) Chloe Gauvin-David	17 pt	120
18	(Spain) Calum Clements	18 pt	154	(United States) Abigail Domit	18 pt	171
19	(United States) Austin Hatfield	19 pt	106	(Australia) Daisy McDonald	19 pt	185
20	(New Zealand) Bayley Martin	20 pt	111	(United States) Alex Gazan	20 pt	217
21	(Iceland) Björgvin Karl Gudmundsson	21 pt	191	(Netherlands) Linda Keesman	21 pt	177
22	(United States) Dallin Pepper	22 pt	286	(United States) Caroline Stanley	22 pt	173
23	(Australia) Peter Ellis	23 pt	114	(United States) Arielle Loewen	23 pt	188
24	(United States) Jack Rozema	24 pt	100	(Norway) Jacqueline Dahlstrøm	24 pt	153
25	(United States) Justin Medeiros	25 pt	219	(Australia) Grace Walton	25 pt	270
26	(South Africa) Ruan Potgieter	26 pt	138	(South Africa) Gemma Rader	26 pt	122
27	(United Kingdom) Harry Lightfoot	27 pt	183	(United States) Shelby Neal	27 pt	133
28	(Authorised Neutral Athletes) Arthur Semenov	28 pt	78	(Brazil) Andreia Pinheiro	28 pt	96
29	(United States) Cole Sager	29 pt	169	(United States) Lexi Neely	29 pt	52
30	(United States) Brandon Luckett	30 pt	192	(Republic of Ireland) Emma McQuaid	30 pt	100
31	(Germany) Moritz Fiebig	31 pt	97	(South Korea) Seungyeon Choi	31 pt	126
32	(United States) Cole Greashaber	32 pt	185	(United States) Kyra Milligan	32 pt	52
33	(Brazil) Bruno Marins	33 pt	127	(Brazil) Julia Kato	33 pt	120
34	(Brazil) Guilherme Malheiros	DNS	46	(United States) Dani Speegle	34 pt	131
35	(Canada) Samuel Cournoyer	–	38	(South Korea) Dawon Jung	35 pt	54
	(Canada) Jeffrey Adler	DNS	40	(Italy) Elisa Fuliano	–	42
	(Serbia) Luka Đukić	DNS	49	(Sweden) Emma Tall	DNS	179
	(France) Victor Hoffer	WD	0	(Brazil) Victoria Campos	DNS	14
	–	–	—	(Slovakia) Karin Freyová	DNS	79
	(Serbia) Lazar Đukić	–	—	(Hungary) Laura Horvath	DNS	76

=== August 10, 2024 ===
==== Event 5: Chad 1000x ====
- 1000 box step-up

Ruck pack: 45/35 lb for men/women.

To be completed as 250 trips

All athletes competed at the same time.

#	Men	Time	Pts Total	Women	Time	Pts Total
1	(United States) James Sprague	43:58.00	446	(Canada) Emily Rolfe	47:01.00	452
2	(United States) Austin Hatfield	44:09.00	203	(Poland) Gabriela Migała	47:15.00	431
3	(Authorised Neutral Athletes) Roman Khrennikov	46:33.00	431	(United States) Haley Adams	47:46.00	446
4	(Canada) Patrick Vellner	46:36.00	387	(Australia) Tia-Clair Toomey	48:19.00	473
5	(United States) Dallin Pepper	47:16.00	374	(United Kingdom) Aimee Cringle	48:46.00	368
6	(Canada) Brent Fikowski	47:36.00	407	(United States) Bethany Flores	49:14.00	425
7	(Belgium) Jelle Hoste	48:32.00	386	(Brazil) Andreia Pinheiro	49:24.00	178
8	(Australia) Jay Crouch	48:40.00	368	(Canada) Chloe Gauvin-David	49:28.00	199
9	(United States) Jayson Hopper	49:16.00	386	(United States) Paige Semenza	49:46.00	347
10	(United Kingdom) Harry Lightfoot	49:44.00	256	(United States) Caroline Stanley	49:56.00	246
11	(Spain) Calum Clements	49:45.00	224	(United States) Abigail Domit	50:26.00	241
12	(United States) Justin Medeiros	49:46.00	286	(United States) Alexis Raptis	50:56.00	260
13	(United States) Samuel Kwant	49:51.00	346	(Netherlands) Linda Keesman	50:57.00	241
14	(United States) Cole Greashaber	50:26.00	246	(United States) Brooke Wells	51:44.00	247
15	(United States) Chris Ibarra	51:14.00	287	(United States) Alex Gazan	52:26.00	275
16	(United States) Jack Rozema	51:21.00	155	(Turkey) Seher Kaya	52:37.00	238
17	(Australia) Ricky Garard	51:25.00	353	(Australia) Daisy McDonald	53:03.00	237
18	(Brazil) Kalyan Souza	51:33.00	296	(Australia) Grace Walton	53:20.00	319
19	(Iceland) Björgvin Karl Gudmundsson	51:40.00	237	(Australia) Madeline Sturt	53:37.00	314
20	(Spain) Aniol Ekai	51:54.00	229	(South Korea) Seungyeon Choi	54:36.00	169
21	(Canada) Alexandre Caron	52:42.00	212	(Republic of Ireland) Emma McQuaid	55:36.00	140
22	(Authorised Neutral Athletes) Arthur Semenov	52:43.00	115	(South Korea) Dawon Jung	56:37.00	91
23	(United States) Saxon Panchik	53:09.00	268	(Norway) Jacqueline Dahlstrøm	56:48.00	187
24	(Brazil) Bruno Marins	53:27.00	159	(United States) Kyra Milligan	57:08.00	84
25	(United States) Luke Parker	54:00.00	251	(United States) Danielle Brandon	57:12.00	282
26	(United States) Cole Sager	54:26.00	197	(Canada) Emma Lawson	57:24.00	242
27	(United States) Brandon Luckett	55:13.00	218	(Brazil) Julia Kato	57:36.00	146
28	(United States) Travis Mayer	55:29.00	244	(United States) Arielle Loewen	57:57.00	212
29	(New Zealand) Bayley Martin	55:56.00	133	(Australia) Georgia Pryer	58:15.00	149
30	(Australia) Peter Ellis	56:27.00	134	(Canada) Hattie Kanyo	58:19.00	247
31	(South Africa) Ruan Potgieter	57:53.00	156	(United States) Shelby Neal	58:31.00	151
32	(Finland) Henrik Haapalainen	CAP+14	251	(France) Claudia Gluck	1:00:45.00	243
33	(Germany) Moritz Fiebig	DNS	97	(United States) Lexi Neely	1:01:31.00	66
34	(Brazil) Guilherme Malheiros	DNS	46	(South Africa) Gemma Rader	1:01:36.00	134
35	(Canada) Samuel Cournoyer	–	38	(United States) Dani Speegle	1:03:50.00	141
	(Canada) Jeffrey Adler	DNS	40	(Italy) Elisa Fuliano	–	42
	(Serbia) Luka Đukić	DNS	49	(Sweden) Emma Tall	DNS	179
	(France) Victor Hoffer	WD	0	(Brazil) Victoria Campos	DNS	14
	–	–	—	(Slovakia) Karin Freyová	DNS	79
	(Serbia) Lazar Đukić	–	—	(Hungary) Laura Horvath	DNS	76

==== Event 6: Clean Ladder ====
- Round 1: 3-2-1-1-1 cleans
- Round 2: 2-1-1-1 cleans
- Round 3: 1-1-1 cleans

Weights for the cleans in the ladder (women / men)

- Round 1: (165/175/185/195/205 lb) / (255/265/275/285/295 lb)
- Round 2: (205/215/225/230 lb ) / (295/305/315/325 lb)
- Round 3: (230/240/250 lb) / (325/345/365 lb

#	Men	Points	Pts Total	Women	Points	Pts Total
1	(United States) Justin Medeiros	1 pt	386	(Australia) Tia-Clair Toomey	1 pt	573
2	(Brazil) Bruno Marins	2 pt	256	(United States) Kyra Milligan	2 pt	181
3	(United States) Travis Mayer	3 pt	338	(United States) Alex Gazan	3 pt	369
4	(United States) Jack Rozema	4 pt	246	(Poland) Gabriela Migała	4 pt	522
5	(Australia) Ricky Garard	5 pt	441	(Canada) Emma Lawson	5 pt	330
6	(United States) Dallin Pepper	6 pt	459	(United States) Shelby Neal	6 pt	236
7	(United States) Austin Hatfield	7 pt	285	(United States) Brooke Wells	7 pt	329
8	(Canada) Brent Fikowski	8 pt	486	(United States) Caroline Stanley	8 pt	325
9	(Finland) Henrik Haapalainen	9 pt	327	(United States) Abigail Domit	9 pt	317
10	(Canada) Patrick Vellner	10 pt	460	(Australia) Madeline Sturt	10 pt	387
11	(Canada) Alexandre Caron	11 pt	282	(Netherlands) Linda Keesman	11 pt	311
12	(United States) Jayson Hopper	12 pt	453	(United States) Paige Semenza	12 pt	414
13	(Spain) Aniol Ekai	13 pt	293	(Australia) Grace Walton	13 pt	383
14	(United States) Cole Greashaber	14 pt	307	(United States) Alexis Raptis	14 pt	321
15	(Iceland) Björgvin Karl Gudmundsson	15 pt	295	(South Korea) Seungyeon Choi	15 pt	227
16	(Australia) Jay Crouch	16 pt	423	(Republic of Ireland) Emma McQuaid	16 pt	195
17	(Spain) Calum Clements	17 pt	276	(South Korea) Dawon Jung	17 pt	143
18	(United Kingdom) Harry Lightfoot	18 pt	305	(Canada) Hattie Kanyo	18 pt	296
19	(New Zealand) Bayley Martin	19 pt	179	(United Kingdom) Aimee Cringle	19 pt	414
20	(United States) Samuel Kwant	20 pt	389	(Brazil) Andreia Pinheiro	20 pt	221
21	(United States) James Sprague	21 pt	486	(France) Claudia Gluck	21 pt	283
22	(Authorised Neutral Athletes) Roman Khrennikov	22 pt	468	(United States) Danielle Brandon	22 pt	319
23	(United States) Luke Parker	23 pt	285	(Turkey) Seher Kaya	23 pt	272
24	(United States) Chris Ibarra	24 pt	319	(Canada) Chloe Gauvin-David	24 pt	231
25	(Brazil) Kalyan Souza	25 pt	326	(United States) Lexi Neely	25 pt	96
26	(Belgium) Jelle Hoste	26 pt	414	(Brazil) Julia Kato	26 pt	174
27	(Australia) Peter Ellis	27 pt	160	(Canada) Emily Rolfe	27 pt	478
28	(United States) Brandon Luckett	28 pt	242	(Australia) Daisy McDonald	27 pt	263
29	(United States) Cole Sager	29 pt	219	(Australia) Georgia Pryer	27 pt	175
30	(United States) Saxon Panchik	30 pt	288	(South Africa) Gemma Rader	27 pt	160
31	(Authorised Neutral Athletes) Arthur Semenov	31 pt	133	(United States) Haley Adams	31 pt	464
32	(South Africa) Ruan Potgieter	32 pt	172	(United States) Bethany Flores	32 pt	441
	(Germany) Moritz Fiebig	DNS	97	(United States) Arielle Loewen	WD	212
	(Brazil) Guilherme Malheiros	DNS	46	(Norway) Jacqueline Dahlstrøm	DNS	187
	(Canada) Samuel Cournoyer	–	38	(United States) Dani Speegle	DNS	141
	(Canada) Jeffrey Adler	DNS	40	(Italy) Elisa Fuliano	–	42
	(Serbia) Luka Đukić	DNS	49	(Sweden) Emma Tall	DNS	179
	(France) Victor Hoffer	WD	0	(Brazil) Victoria Campos	DNS	14
	–	–	—	(Slovakia) Karin Freyová	DNS	79
	(Serbia) Lazar Đukić	–	—	(Hungary) Laura Horvath	DNS	76

==== Event 7: Push Pull 2.0 ====
For time:

- 45 handstand push-ups
- 80-foot sled pull from standing (110/180 lb)
- 30 strict handstand push-ups
- 80-foot sled pull seated from the platform
- 15 freestanding handstand push-ups

#	Men	Time	Pts Total	Women	Time	Pts Total
1	(United States) Saxon Panchik	06:20.80	388	(United States) Lexi Neely	06:03.41	196
2	(Canada) Brent Fikowski	07:08.36	583	(United States) Alexis Raptis	06:31.62	418
3	(Australia) Jay Crouch	07:24.83	517	(United States) Brooke Wells	06:47.44	423
4	(South Africa) Ruan Potgieter	07:35.94	263	(Canada) Chloe Gauvin-David	06:49.86	322
5	(United States) Justin Medeiros	07:56.36	474	(United States) Danielle Brandon	06:51.80	407
6	(Spain) Calum Clements	08:05.76	361	(France) Claudia Gluck	07:16.22	368
7	(United States) Cole Greashaber	08:06.75	389	(Australia) Tia-Clair Toomey	07:18.46	655
8	(United States) Cole Sager	08:15.51	298	(United States) Bethany Flores	07:43.31	520
9	(United States) Travis Mayer	08:29.66	414	(Canada) Emily Rolfe	07:49.20	554
10	(United States) Jayson Hopper	08:37.48	526	(Poland) Gabriela Migała	08:02.46	595
11	(United States) Dallin Pepper	08:37.85	529	(United States) Abigail Domit	08:28.43	387
12	(Authorised Neutral Athletes) Roman Khrennikov	08:44.28	535	(Canada) Hattie Kanyo	08:29.08	363
13	(Australia) Ricky Garard	08:48.22	505	(United States) Kyra Milligan	08:29.45	245
14	(United States) Chris Ibarra	08:52.66	380	(United States) Shelby Neal	08:31.18	297
15	(Canada) Patrick Vellner	08:54.49	518	(Turkey) Seher Kaya	08:50.81	330
16	(Iceland) Björgvin Karl Gudmundsson	08:56.32	350	(Canada) Emma Lawson	08:51.01	385
17	(United States) James Sprague	09:40.03	538	(United States) Haley Adams	08:58.00	516
18	(United Kingdom) Harry Lightfoot	09:42.34	354	(Netherlands) Linda Keesman	09:00.82	360
19	(United States) Samuel Kwant	09:51.48	435	(Australia) Georgia Pryer	09:17.53	221
20	(Brazil) Bruno Marins	CAP+1	299	(Australia) Grace Walton	09:21.63	426
21	(Australia) Peter Ellis	CAP+1	200	(United Kingdom) Aimee Cringle	09:26.15	454
22	(United States) Austin Hatfield	CAP+4	322	(Republic of Ireland) Emma McQuaid	09:49.64	232
23	(Spain) Aniol Ekai	CAP+5	327	(Australia) Madeline Sturt	CAP+3	421
24	(Canada) Alexandre Caron	CAP+5	314	(United States) Caroline Stanley	CAP+4	357
25	(Brazil) Kalyan Souza	CAP+5	356	(United States) Alex Gazan	CAP+6	399
26	(Finland) Henrik Haapalainen	CAP+6	355	(Brazil) Julia Kato	CAP+8	202
27	(Belgium) Jelle Hoste	CAP+7	440	(South Korea) Seungyeon Choi	CAP+8	253
28	(New Zealand) Bayley Martin	CAP+8	203	(United States) Paige Semenza	CAP+9	438
29	(United States) Brandon Luckett	CAP+9	264	(South Africa) Gemma Rader	CAP+9	182
30	(United States) Jack Rozema	CAP+10	266	(Australia) Daisy McDonald	CAP+9	283
31	(United States) Luke Parker	CAP+12	303	(Brazil) Andreia Pinheiro	CAP+14	239
32	(Authorised Neutral Athletes) Arthur Semenov	–	133	(South Korea) Dawon Jung	CAP+15	159
	(Germany) Moritz Fiebig	DNS	97	(United States) Arielle Loewen	WD	212
	(Brazil) Guilherme Malheiros	DNS	46	(Norway) Jacqueline Dahlstrøm	DNS	187
	(Canada) Samuel Cournoyer	–	38	(United States) Dani Speegle	DNS	141
	(Canada) Jeffrey Adler	DNS	40	(Italy) Elisa Fuliano	–	42
	(Serbia) Luka Đukić	DNS	49	(Sweden) Emma Tall	DNS	179
	(France) Victor Hoffer	WD	0	(Brazil) Victoria Campos	DNS	14
	–	–	—	(Slovakia) Karin Freyová	DNS	79
	(Serbia) Lazar Đukić	–	—	(Hungary) Laura Horvath	DNS	76

=== August 11, 2024 ===
==== Event 8: Dickies Triplet ====
5 rounds for time:

- 175-meter run
- 12 toes-to-bars
- 8 alternating dumbbell snatches (70/100 lb)

#	Men	Time	Pts Total	Women	Time	Pts Total
1	(United States) Jayson Hopper	07:04.19	626	(Australia) Tia-Clair Toomey	07:23.69	755
2	(United States) James Sprague	07:07.98	634	(Poland) Gabriela Migała	07:33.59	691
3	(Canada) Brent Fikowski	07:14.24	675	(United States) Haley Adams	07:49.22	608
4	(Canada) Patrick Vellner	07:17.10	606	(Canada) Emily Rolfe	07:54.29	642
5	(United States) Dallin Pepper	07:17.25	613	(United States) Alexis Raptis	07:56.06	502
6	(Finland) Henrik Haapalainen	07:25.25	435	(United States) Brooke Wells	07:57.66	503
7	(United States) Saxon Panchik	07:25.93	464	(United States) Danielle Brandon	07:59.26	483
8	(United States) Austin Hatfield	07:28.63	394	(United States) Bethany Flores	08:01.42	592
9	(Canada) Alexandre Caron	07:33.23	382	(United States) Alex Gazan	08:01.96	467
10	(United States) Justin Medeiros	07:34.06	538	(United States) Caroline Stanley	08:05.41	421
11	(Spain) Aniol Ekai	07:34.37	387	(United Kingdom) Aimee Cringle	08:06.22	514
12	(United States) Travis Mayer	07:36.40	470	(United States) Abigail Domit	08:08.12	443
13	(United States) Samuel Kwant	07:39.46	487	(Turkey) Seher Kaya	08:09.99	382
14	(Iceland) Björgvin Karl Gudmundsson	07:43.92	398	(Canada) Emma Lawson	08:12.65	433
15	(Spain) Calum Clements	07:44.30	406	(Australia) Madeline Sturt	08:16.28	466
16	(Brazil) Kalyan Souza	07:46.16	398	(United States) Paige Semenza	08:20.03	480
17	(United Kingdom) Harry Lightfoot	07:47.25	393	(Australia) Grace Walton	08:20.59	465
18	(United States) Chris Ibarra	07:49.95	416	(Canada) Hattie Kanyo	08:24.88	399
19	(Australia) Jay Crouch	07:51.35	550	(Canada) Chloe Gauvin-David	08:27.21	355
20	(New Zealand) Bayley Martin	07:51.88	233	(Republic of Ireland) Emma McQuaid	08:28.62	262
21	(United States) Jack Rozema	07:53.37	293	(United States) Kyra Milligan	08:31.28	272
22	(Australia) Ricky Garard	07:59.25	529	(United States) Shelby Neal	08:32.56	321
23	(Belgium) Jelle Hoste	07:59.73	461	(Netherlands) Linda Keesman	08:40.56	381
24	(United States) Cole Sager	08:01.22	316	(South Korea) Seungyeon Choi	08:50.74	271
25	(United States) Cole Greashaber	08:03.11	404	(France) Claudia Gluck	08:55.88	383
26	(United States) Luke Parker	08:04.67	315	(United States) Lexi Neely	09:01.00	208
27	(Authorised Neutral Athletes) Roman Khrennikov	08:09.47	544	(Brazil) Andreia Pinheiro	09:29.75	248
28	(United States) Brandon Luckett	08:24.91	270	(Australia) Georgia Pryer	09:43.51	227
29	(Brazil) Bruno Marins	08:29.56	302	(Brazil) Julia Kato	09:52.67	205
30	(South Africa) Ruan Potgieter	09:46.18	263	(Australia) Daisy McDonald	09:53.06	283
	(Australia) Peter Ellis	–	200	(South Africa) Gemma Rader	–	182
	(Authorised Neutral Athletes) Arthur Semenov	–	133	(South Korea) Dawon Jung	—	159
	(Germany) Moritz Fiebig	—	97	(United States) Arielle Loewen	–	212
	(Brazil) Guilherme Malheiros	–	46	(Norway) Jacqueline Dahlstrøm	–	187
	(Canada) Samuel Cournoyer	–	38	(United States) Dani Speegle	—	141
	(Canada) Jeffrey Adler	–	40	(Italy) Elisa Fuliano	–	42
	(Serbia) Luka Đukić	–	49	(Sweden) Emma Tall	–	179
	(France) Victor Hoffer	–	0	(Brazil) Victoria Campos	–	14
	–	–	—	(Slovakia) Karin Freyová	—	79
	(Serbia) Lazar Đukić	–	—	(Hungary) Laura Horvath	–	76

==== Event 9: Final 2421 ====
For time:

- 24 thrusters (65/95 lb)
- 24 chest-to-bar pull-ups
- 80-foot yoke carry (245/425 lb)
- 21 chest-to-bar pull-ups
- 21 thrusters

#	Men	Time	Pts Total	Women	Time	Pts Total
1	(United States) Austin Hatfield	02:25.94	494	(United States) Alexis Raptis	02:28.75	602
2	(United States) Dallin Pepper	02:31.58	709	(Australia) Tia-Clair Toomey	02:31.13	851
3	(United States) Samuel Kwant	02:31.79	579	(United States) Kyra Milligan	02:33.77	364
4	(Finland) Henrik Haapalainen	02:32.98	523	(France) Claudia Gluck	02:34.12	471
5	(United States) James Sprague	02:34.85	718	(Australia) Madeline Sturt	02:37.68	550
6	(United States) Jayson Hopper	02:35.57	706	(United States) Paige Semenza	02:39.39	560
7	(Spain) Aniol Ekai	02:35.91	463	(United States) Brooke Wells	02:40.23	579
8	(New Zealand) Bayley Martin	02:36.46	305	(United States) Danielle Brandon	02:40.67	555
9	(Canada) Patrick Vellner	02:37.26	674	(United States) Bethany Flores	02:43.76	660
10	(United States) Saxon Panchik	02:37.91	528	(Poland) Gabriela Migała	02:46.89	755
11	(Canada) Brent Fikowski	02:38.75	735	(Canada) Emily Rolfe	02:47.20	702
12	(United States) Jack Rozema	02:39.80	349	(United States) Haley Adams	02:47.22	664
13	(United States) Chris Ibarra	02:40.01	468	(United States) Alex Gazan	02:49.21	519
14	(Belgium) Jelle Hoste	02:40.58	509	(United States) Lexi Neely	02:56.22	256
15	(United States) Justin Medeiros	02:40.73	583	(South Korea) Seungyeon Choi	03:01.05	316
16	(United Kingdom) Harry Lightfoot	02:41.17	435	(Australia) Grace Walton	03:02.00	507
17	(United States) Cole Greashaber	02:41.30	443	(United States) Caroline Stanley	03:04.23	460
18	(Spain) Calum Clements	02:44.33	442	(Republic of Ireland) Emma McQuaid	03:04.99	298
19	(United States) Cole Sager	02:46.59	349	(United States) Shelby Neal	03:07.21	354
20	(Iceland) Björgvin Karl Gudmundsson	02:47.38	428	(Netherlands) Linda Keesman	03:07.23	411
21	(South Africa) Ruan Potgieter	02:51.38	290	(Canada) Hattie Kanyo	03:10.91	426
22	(Canada) Alexandre Caron	02:51.71	406	(Australia) Georgia Pryer	03:12.33	251
23	(Authorised Neutral Athletes) Roman Khrennikov	02:51.71	568	(Turkey) Seher Kaya	03:15.56	403
24	(Australia) Ricky Garard	02:55.25	547	(Canada) Emma Lawson	03:17.90	451
25	(Brazil) Bruno Marins	02:56.73	317	(United Kingdom) Aimee Cringle	03:18.15	529
26	(Brazil) Kalyan Souza	02:58.49	410	(United States) Abigail Domit	03:18.66	455
27	(United States) Brandon Luckett	03:00.04	279	(Brazil) Julia Kato	03:35.74	214
28	(United States) Luke Parker	03:03.77	321	(Canada) Chloe Gauvin-David	03:41.92	361
29	(United States) Travis Mayer	03:07.74	473	(Australia) Daisy McDonald	03:50.17	286
30	(Australia) Jay Crouch	WD	550	(Brazil) Andreia Pinheiro	CAP+26	248
	(Australia) Peter Ellis	–	200	(South Africa) Gemma Rader	–	182
	(Authorised Neutral Athletes) Arthur Semenov	–	133	(South Korea) Dawon Jung	—	159
	(Germany) Moritz Fiebig	—	97	(United States) Arielle Loewen	–	212
	(Brazil) Guilherme Malheiros	–	46	(Norway) Jacqueline Dahlstrøm	–	187
	(Canada) Samuel Cournoyer	–	38	(United States) Dani Speegle	—	141
	(Canada) Jeffrey Adler	–	40	(Italy) Elisa Fuliano	–	42
	(Serbia) Luka Đukić	–	49	(Sweden) Emma Tall	–	179
	(France) Victor Hoffer	–	0	(Brazil) Victoria Campos	–	14
	–	–	—	(Slovakia) Karin Freyová	—	79
	(Serbia) Lazar Đukić	–	—	(Hungary) Laura Horvath	–	76

==== Event 10: Final 1815 ====
Athletes rest for 2 minutes after Even 9, then

- 18 thrusters (95/135 lb)
- 18 bar muscle-ups
- 80-foot yoke carry (345/525 lb)
- 15 bar muscle-ups
- 15 thrusters

#	Men	Time	Pts Total	Women	Time	Pts Total
1	(United States) Austin Hatfield	04:40.12	594	(Australia) Tia-Clair Toomey	04:33.89	951
2	(Iceland) Björgvin Karl Gudmundsson	05:07.78	524	(United States) Alexis Raptis	05:05.61	698
3	(Australia) Ricky Garard	05:18.73	639	(France) Claudia Gluck	05:10.75	563
4	(United States) James Sprague	05:22.54	806	(Australia) Madeline Sturt	05:13.58	638
5	(United States) Samuel Kwant	05:23.93	663	(United States) Danielle Brandon	05:22.85	639
6	(United States) Cole Greashaber	05:26.05	523	(United States) Alex Gazan	05:29.83	599
7	(United States) Dallin Pepper	05:26.30	785	(United States) Bethany Flores	05:33.40	736
8	(United States) Travis Mayer	05:26.59	545	(United States) Haley Adams	05:40.23	736
9	(Canada) Patrick Vellner	05:26.59	742	(Canada) Emily Rolfe	05:43.03	770
10	(United States) Saxon Panchik	05:36.99	592	(Canada) Chloe Gauvin-David	05:45.50	425
11	(Spain) Aniol Ekai	05:41.26	523	(United States) Lexi Neely	05:47.70	316
12	(United States) Justin Medeiros	05:43.93	639	(United States) Shelby Neal	06:00.02	410
13	(United States) Cole Sager	05:44.04	401	(United States) Paige Semenza	06:05.54	612
14	(United States) Chris Ibarra	05:50.87	516	(United States) Kyra Milligan	06:11.99	412
15	(Spain) Calum Clements	05:54.07	487	(Poland) Gabriela Migała	06:18.33	800
16	(United Kingdom) Harry Lightfoot	05:54.38	477	(Canada) Emma Lawson	06:27.09	493
17	(Canada) Alexandre Caron	05:56.17	445	(United States) Abigail Domit	06:28.25	494
18	(United States) Jayson Hopper	05:57.79	742	(Netherlands) Linda Keesman	06:32.52	447
19	(Authorised Neutral Athletes) Roman Khrennikov	06:01.64	601	(Canada) Hattie Kanyo	06:33.95	459
20	(Canada) Brent Fikowski	06:07.47	765	(Brazil) Andreia Pinheiro	06:35.40	278
21	(United States) Jack Rozema	06:08.09	376	(United States) Caroline Stanley	06:35.60	487
22	(Brazil) Bruno Marins	06:24.12	317	(Republic of Ireland) Emma McQuaid	06:35.68	322
23	(Belgium) Jelle Hoste	06:24.12	530	(Turkey) Seher Kaya	06:37.11	424
24	(Finland) Henrik Haapalainen	06:39.39	541	(Australia) Georgia Pryer	06:48.92	269
25	(United States) Brandon Luckett	06:42.41	294	(South Korea) Seungyeon Choi	06:49.46	331
26	(Brazil) Kalyan Souza	06:54.86	422	(United States) Brooke Wells	06:57.20	591
27	(United States) Luke Parker	06:59.30	330	(United Kingdom) Aimee Cringle	CAP+6	538
28	(South Africa) Ruan Potgieter	CAP+1	296	(Brazil) Julia Kato	CAP+64	223
29	(New Zealand) Bayley Martin	CAP+7	308	(Australia) Daisy McDonald	CAP+6	295
30	(Australia) Jay Crouch	WD	550	(Australia) Grace Walton	CAP+20	507
	(Australia) Peter Ellis	–	200	(South Africa) Gemma Rader	–	182
	(Authorised Neutral Athletes) Arthur Semenov	–	133	(South Korea) Dawon Jung	–	159
	(Germany) Moritz Fiebig	—	97	(United States) Arielle Loewen	–	212
	(Brazil) Guilherme Malheiros	–	46	(Norway) Jacqueline Dahlstrøm	–	187
	(Canada) Samuel Cournoyer	–	38	(United States) Dani Speegle	–	141
	(Canada) Jeffrey Adler	–	40	(Italy) Elisa Fuliano	–	42
	(Serbia) Luka Đukić	–	49	(Sweden) Emma Tall	–	179
	(France) Victor Hoffer	–	0	(Brazil) Victoria Campos	–	14
	–	–	—	(Slovakia) Karin Freyová	—	79
	(Serbia) Lazar Đukić	–	—	(Hungary) Laura Horvath	–	76

=== Final standings ===
Men
#	Name	Pts
1	(United States) James Sprague	806
2	(United States) Dallin Pepper	785
3	(Canada) Brent Fikowski	765
4	(United States) Jayson Hopper	742
5	(Canada) Patrick Vellner	742
6	(United States) Sam Kwant	663
7	(Australia) Ricky Garard	639
8	(United States) Justin Medeiros	639
9	(Authorised Neutral Athletes) Roman Khrennikov	601
10	(United States) Austin Hatfield	594
11	(United States) Saxon Panchik	592
12	(Australia) Jay Crouch	550
13	(United States) Travis Mayer	545
14	(Finland) Henrik Haapalainen	541
15	(Belgium) Jelle Hoste	530
16	(Iceland) Björgvin Karl Gudmundsson	524
17	(United States) Cole Greashaber	523
18	(Spain) Aniol Ekai	523
19	(United States) Chris Ibarra	516
20	(Spain) Calum Clements	487
21	(United Kingdom) Harry Lightfoot	477
22	(Canada) Alexandre Caron	445
23	(Brazil) Kalyan Souza	422
24	(United States) Cole Sager	401
25	(United States) Jack Rozema	376
26	(Brazil) Bruno Marins	341
27	(United States) Luke Parker	330
28	(New Zealand) Bayley Martin	308
29	(South Africa) Ruan Potgieter	296
30	(United States) Brandon Luckett	294
31	(Australia) Peter Ellis	200
32	(Authorised Neutral Athletes) Arthur Semenov	133
33	(Germany) Moritz Fiebig	97
34	(Serbia) Luka Đukić	49
35	(Brazil) Guilherme Malheiros	46
36	(Canada) Jeffrey Adler	40
37	(Canada) Samuel Cournoyer	38
38	(France) Victor Hoffer	0
	(Serbia) Lazar Đukić	

Women
#	Name	Pts
1	(Australia) Tia-Clair Toomey	951
2	(Poland) Gabriela Migała	800
3	(Canada) Emily Rolfe	770
4	(United States) Bethany Flores	736
5	(United States) Haley Adams	736
6	(United States) Alexis Raptis	698
7	(United States) Danielle Brandon	639
8	(Australia) Madeline Sturt	638
9	(United States) Paige Semenza	612
10	(United States) Alex Gazan	599
11	(United States) Brooke Wells	591
12	(France) Claudia Gluck	563
13	(United Kingdom) Aimee Cringle	538
14	(Australia) Grace Walton	507
15	(United States) Abigail Domit	494
16	(Canada) Emma Lawson	493
17	(United States) Caroline Stanley	487
18	(Canada) Hattie Kanyo	459
19	(Netherlands) Linda Keesman	447
20	(Canada) Chloe Gauvin-David	425
21	(Turkey) Seher Kaya	424
22	(United States) Kyra Milligan	412
23	(United States) Shelby Neal	410
24	(South Korea) Seungyeon Choi	331
25	(Republic of Ireland) Emma McQuaid	322
26	(United States) Lexi Neely	316
27	(Australia) Daisy McDonald	295
28	(Brazil) Andreia Pinheiro	278
29	(Australia) Georgia Pryer	269
30	(Brazil) Julia Kato	223
31	(United States) Arielle Loewen	212
32	(Norway) Jacqueline Dahlstrøm	187
33	(South Africa) Gemma Rader	182
34	(Sweden) Emma Tall	179
35	(South Korea) Dawon Jung	159
36	(United States) Dani Speegle	141
37	(Slovakia) Karin Freyova	79
38	(Hungary) Laura Horvath	76
39	(Italy) Elisa Fuliano	42
40	(Brazil) Victoria Campos	14

== Death of Lazar Ðukić ==
The first day (Thursday) was cancelled after a fatality in the first event, an aquathlon that featured a 3.5-mile (5.6 km) run followed by an 800-meter (0.50 mi) swim at Marine Creek Lake Park and Trail. Tarrant County officials officially confirmed Lazar Đukić, a 28-year-old Serbian competitor, died during the swim portion of the aquathlon. An investigation into the death, including an independent third-party review, was announced. The Professional Fitness Athletes' Association, a group that represents the interest of CrossFit athletes, demanded that there should be "appropriate level of transparency" on the third-party investigation and subsequent changes to protect the athletes, that an independent safety team should be created, and that Dave Castro, the leader of the sport team, should be removed.

This is not the first time that the swim portion of a CrossFit event has raised safety concerns. During the 2017 CrossFit Games, Brent Fikowski, who later founded PFAA, prevented fellow competitor Mat Fraser from drowning when he outpaced himself during a run-swim-run event. According to Fraser's at-the-time endurance coach, Chris Hinshaw, Fraser had started bobbing in the water after outpacing himself and "was going to drown."

== Team competition ==
The teams events for August 8 were canceled after the drowning of a competitor. Two teams also withdrew from the competition.

=== August 9, 2024 ===
Squat, Ski, Climb

For time: 40 synchro sandbag squats (150/200 lb) 1 legless rope climb each 40-calorie ski erg 1 legless rope climb each 10 Earthworm thrusters 2 legless rope climbs each 10 Earthworm thrusters 1 legless rope climb each 40-calorie ski erg 1 legless rope climb each 40 synchro sandbag squats (150/200 lb)

Team Firestorm

All for time: F/F pair completes 3 rounds for time of: 11-calorie Echo bike 11 burpees over barricade

M/M pair completes 3 rounds for time of: 15-calorie Echo bike 11 burpees over barricade

Farrington Five

For time: 1,600-meter team run 54-yard Bob Push (942 lb)

=== August 10, 2024 ===
Inverted Earthworm

For time: 20 Earthworm cleans 60 handstand push-ups 20 Earthworm cleans 40 strict handstand push-ups 20 Earthworm cleans 10 freestanding handstand push-ups

3 Amigos

For time: 120 synchro wall-ball shots (14/20 lb, 10-foot target) 90 synchro GHD sit-ups 60 synchro box jump-overs 30 synchro dumbbell snatches (70/100 lb)

=== August 11, 2024 ===
Fort Worth Shuffle

For time: 30-foot Earthworm lunge (L) 25 chest-to-bar pull-ups/run 25 chest-to-bar pull-ups/run 30-foot Earthworm lunge (R) 20 toes-to-bars/run 20 toes-to-bars/run 30-foot Earthworm lunge (L) 15 bar muscle-ups/run 15 bar muscle-ups/run 30-foot Earthworm lunge (R)

Beasts of Burden

For time: 120-foot Snail push (720 lb) 80 synchro deadlifts (225/315 lb) 120-foot Snail push

=== Final standings ===
Teams
#	Name	Pts
1	(Australia) Raw Iron CrossFit Mayhem Thunder	624
2	(Australia) CrossFit Torian Mayhem	588
3	(United States) Peak 360 CrossFit	582
4	(United States) CrossFit Mayhem	564
5	(United States) 8th Day CrossFit	498
6	(United States) CrossFit Invictus	474
7	(Norway) CrossFit Oslo Kriger BLST	442
8	(United States) CrossFit Invictus Unconquerable	441
9	(United States) Einhorn CrossFit	422
10	(United States) Ocean State CrossFit Surge	401
11	(Norway) CrossFit Oslo Kriger Rizz	383
12	(United States) CrossFit Reignited	377
13	(United States) CrossFit 1124	343
14	(Mexico) CrossFit Queretaro The W Pack	341
15	(Canada) CrossFit Levis Mayhem	331
16	(Sweden) CrossFit Prestanda Kriger	319
17	(United States) CrossFit Overtake Team Density	294
18	(Sweden) CrossFit Holistic	282
19	(Australia) CrossFit EXF	276
20	(Norway) CrossFit Oslo Kriger PSL	248
21	(United States) CrossFit Kemah	145
22	(South Africa) CrossFit Tijger Valley Relentless	126
23	(United States) TTT CrossFit Endure	126
24	(United States) Rhino CrossFit	126
25	(Argentina) AR-1 CrossFit Mayhem	114
26	(Brazil) Vittoria CrossFit Centr1 Movimento	90
27	(South Korea) CrossFit Marvel Black Mayhem	60
28	(Denmark) CrossFit Butcher's Lab Flæk	48
	(Spain) C23 CrossFit The Progrm Motion	
	(Sweden) CrossFit Walleye Orka	

== Age-group divisions ==
The Masters and Teens competitions were held separately from the main CrossFit Games but still considered part of the CrossFit Games. The 2024 Masters CrossFit Games were held on August 29-September 1 at the Birmingham-Jefferson County Civic Center. A 70+ division was added as a trial, but it was not considered part of the CrossFit Games season. Team events were also held. The Teenage CrossFit Games were held on August 30-September 1 at CrossFit Triple Ranch in Three Rivers, Michigan and the Wings Event Center in Kalamazoo, Michigan. Two other competitions, Pit Teen Throwdown and Pit Collegiate Throwdown were also held there at the same time but they were not part of the CrossFit Games.

=== Masters men ===
Place	35–39	40–44	45–49	50–54	55–59	60–64	65+
1st	Will Moorad	Jonathan Edel	Jason Grubb	Justin LaSala	John Kim	Joe Ames	John George
2nd	Henry Matthews	Chicho Quesada	Robby McCord	Shawn Ramirez	Vic McQuaide	David Powell	Freddie Cherry
3rd	Bronislaw Olenkowicz	Julian Serna	Robbie Perovich	Joel Hughes	Leonardo Wernersbach Lima	Tom Fameree	David Hippensteel

Note: Jamie McGarva finished second in Men's 50-54 but was disqualified after a positive test for GW501516.

=== Masters women ===
Place	35–39	40–44	45–49	50–54	55–59	60–64	65+
1st	Andrea Nisler	Carly Newlands	Deanna Posey	Janet Black	Joyanne Cooper	Laurie Meschishnick	Patricia McGill
2nd	Caroline Kluttz	Andreia Pinheiro	Kelly Friel	Jen Dieter	Tiiu Maavere	Betsy Vanderburgh	Denise Moore
3rd	Sami Scorzelli	Carleen Mathews	{Vol Voboril}	Kim Purdy	Tia Vesser	Marion Valkenburg	Julie Holt

=== Teens ===
Place	14–15 Boys	14–15 Girls	16–17 Boys	16–17 Girls
1st	Pablo Tronchon	Keira McManus	RJ Mestre	Reese Littlewood
2nd	Akil Lopez	Ana Laura Cattai	Kaiden Steyn	Elsie Larson
3rd	Redding Williams	Trenna Gessell	Kā'eo Subiono	Lucy McGonigle

== Adaptive divisions ==
The 2024 Adaptive CrossFit Games was held at Morgan’s Wonderland and the Henry B. Gonzalez Convention Center on September 19–22, in San Antonio, Texas.
