= 1969 Continental Football League season =

- Duration: August 23 – November 23, 1969
- Eastern champions champions: Indianapolis Capitols
- Western champions champions: San Antonio Toros
- Date: December 13, 1969
- Finals venue: Bush Stadium, Indianapolis
- Finals champions: Indianapolis Capitols

COFL seasons seasons
- ← 1968 1970 TAFL; 1970 ACFL →

The 1969 COFL season was the fifth and final season of the Continental Football League (COFL). Following the season, nine of the league's remaining teams split from the league, with five forming the Trans-American Football League and four joining the Atlantic Coast Football League.

== Franchise changes ==
- The Michigan Arrows moved to Midland, Michigan and became the Tri-City Apollos. They were an informal farm team of the NFL's Detroit Lions.
- The Hawaii Warriors were announced as a new league franchise in January 1969, but were unable to raise the necessary money to keep the team alive. Their spot in the league was instead given to Portland, Oregon.
- A franchise was awarded to Newark, New Jersey, which was subsequently named the Jersey Jays. The Jays were later announced to be a farm team of the NFL's Cleveland Browns.
- The Orange County Ramblers announced a relocation to San Bernardino, California but had their franchise revoked several weeks later for failing to confirm conditional approval. Their player contracts were later assumed by the Portland Loggers.
- On September 21, 1969 the Mexico Golden Aztecs ceased operations and forfeited the remainder of their 1969 schedule.
- The Spokane Shockers became a farm team of the AFL's Oakland Raiders.
- The TFL's El Paso Jets franchise was revoked for failure to comply with league regulations regarding several issues.

== General news ==
- James Dunn was named commissioner of the league.
- On January 25, 1969 it was announced that the COFL was adding the entirety of the eight-team Texas Football League to its ranks. The TFL joined as a separate entity and was placed into the new Texas Division (itself split into East and West). The new teams were mostly scheduled to play against each other but did also play interleague contests.
- The league office moved from San Jose to Indianapolis.
- As a result of the addition of the eight TFL franchises, the league was split into four divisions.
- The league established the Glen Hepburn Memorial Award for Community Service, named for an Omaha Mustangs player who died from an injury sustained during a game the previous September.

== Regular season ==
W = Wins, L = Losses, T = Ties, PCT= Winning Percentage, PF= Points For, PA = Points Against

y = Division Champion

Atlantic Division
Team	W	L	T	PCT	PF	PA	Stadium	Coach
Orlando Panthers	10	2	0	.833	330	160	Tangerine Bowl	Dick Pesonen
Norfolk Neptunes	8	4	0	.667	366	224	Foreman Field	Gary Glick/George Hughes
Jersey Jays	7	5	0	.583	265	254	Newark Schools Stadium	Nick Cutro
Alabama Hawks	6	6	0	.500	221	246	Milton Frank Stadium	Dave Sington
Arkansas Diamonds	5	7	0	.417	236	298	War Memorial Stadium	Fred Williams
Central Division
Team	W	L	T	PCT	PF	PA	Stadium	Coach
Indianapolis Capitols	8	4	0	.667	276	202	Bush Stadium	Ken Carpenter
Ohio Valley Ironmen	6	6	0	.500	245	313	Wheeling Island Stadium	Lou Blumling
Omaha Mustangs	6	6	0	.500	265	246	Johnny Rosenblatt Stadium	Don Fleming
Chicago Owls	5	7	0	.417	208	247	Soldier Field	Bob Webb
Tri-City Apollos	2	10	0	.167	148	270	Midland Stadium	Chuck Cherundolo
Texas Division West
Team	W	L	T	PCT	PF	PA	Stadium	Coach
San Antonio Toros	7	4	0	.636	279	180	Harlandale Memorial Stadium	Hoover Evans
West Texas Rufneks	7	4	0	.636	244	212	Memorial Stadium	Lou Rymkus
Mexico Golden Aztecs	2	6	0	.250	72	108	Estadio Universitario	Duncan McCauley
Texas Division East
Team	W	L	T	PCT	PF	PA	Stadium	Coach
Texarkana Titans	7	5	0	.583	245	248	Grim Stadium	Tom Collins/Jimmy Cobb
Oklahoma Thunderbirds	5	6	0	.455	306	334	Custer Stadium	Art Ramage
Fort Worth Braves	5	7	0	.417	262	259	Farrington Field	John Hatley
Dallas Rockets	1	10	0	.091	129	318	Roffino Stadium	Joe Verret
Pacific Division
Team	W	L	T	PCT	PF	PA	Stadium	Coach
Las Vegas Cowboys	8	4	0	.667	249	181	Cashman Field	Paul Massey
Sacramento Capitols	8	4	0	.667	192	163	Hughes Stadium	George Porter
Seattle Rangers	7	5	0	.583	221	185	Memorial Stadium	Don White
Spokane Shockers	5	7	0	.417	253	243	Joe Albi Stadium	Hugh Taylor
Portland Loggers	3	9	0	.250	219	348	Multnomah Stadium	Chuck Fenenbock

== Playoffs ==
Home team in CAPITALS

Divisional playoffs, round 1 (November 29, 1969)

- San Antonio 20, TEXARKANA 7
- Las Vegas 31, SACRAMENTO 0
- INDIANAPOLIS 27, Orlando 7

Divisional playoffs, round 2 (December 7, 1969)

- SAN ANTONIO 21, Las Vegas 17

League Championship (December 13, 1969)

- INDIANAPOLIS 44, San Antonio 38 (OT)

== Awards ==
- MVP: Johnnie Walton, QB, Indianapolis
- Coach of the Year: Ken Carpenter, Indianapolis
