= Emma Lawson =

Canadian CrossFit athlete

Personal information
- Born: January 5, 2005 (age 21) Cambridge, Ontario, Canada
- Occupation: CrossFit Athlete
- Years active: 2019–Present
- Height: 5 ft 4 in (1.63 m)
- Weight: 140 lb (64 kg)

Sport
- Sport: CrossFit

Achievements and titles
- Personal bests: Clean and Jerk: 240 lb (110 kg); Snatch: 192 lb (87 kg); Deadlift: 345 lb (156 kg); Back Squat: 315 lb (143 kg)
Medal record
CrossFit
CrossFit Games
Bronze medal – third place	2019	Girls (14-15)
Gold medal – first place	2020	Girls Quarterfinals* (14-15)
Gold medal – first place	2021	Girls (16-17)
Silver medal – second place	2023	Women
Rogue Invitational
Bronze medal – third place	2022	Women
Bronze medal – third place	2023	Women
World Fitness Project
Bronze medal – third place	2025	Women
- *No teens finals were held in 2020 due to the COVID-19 Pandemic

Emma Lawson (born Jan 5, 2005) is a Canadian CrossFit athlete known for her achievements in the CrossFit Games, since her first appearance at the 2019 Games where she achieved a third-place podium finish in the Girls (14–15) division. In 2020 she placed 1st worldwide in the Girls (14–15) quarterfinals, but no Teens event was held at the games that year due to the COVID-19 pandemic. After winning first-place in the Girls (16–17) division in 2021, she has competed in adult Women category, achieving sixth-place in 2022 and second-place podium finishes in 2023 and 2026.

In addition to the CrossFit Games, Lawson has competed in the CrossFit event held at the Rogue Invitational, with a third-place finish in both 2022 and 2023.

== Early life ==
Lawson was born in Cambridge, Ontario to parents Pete and Cybil. She currently resides in Cambridge, Ontario.

Lawson's experience with CrossFit began by watching her parents' workouts when they joined the sport in 2011. Shortly after, she began participating in the sport herself by joining a CrossFit Kids program at age seven.

== Professional career ==
Lawson competed in the CrossFit Games Teen competitions from 2019 through 2021. She made the podium every year, including a first-place finish in the Girls 16-17 age group in 2021.

In 2022 she competed in the Women's division at the age of 17 as the fourth-youngest competitor to compete in the adult division at the Games. During the 2022 Games she briefly held the first-place position, making her the youngest to ever lead the games as an individual. She placed 6th overall and won the "Rookie of the Year" award for her performance.

At the 2023 CrossFit Games Lawson had her first career win in an individual event at the Games by winning the first event "Ride". She had a consistent performance and was the only woman to place inside top 15 in all events, and led the field after the second and third day. She lost the top spot in the final day to Laura Horvath who achieved three consecutive event wins in the final four events, and finished on the podium in second place, making her the youngest individual female competitor to podium in games history.

=== CrossFit Games results ===
Year	Division	Games	Quarterfinal	Open
2019	Girls (14–15)	3rd	3rd	5th
2020	Girls (14–15)	No Teen Event due to COVID-19 Pandemic	1st	1st
2021	Girls (16–17)	1st	2nd	3rd
2022	Women	6th	10th	102nd
2023	Women	2nd	10th	3rd
2024	Women	16th	1st	46th
2026	Women	2nd	20th	4th

=== Rogue Invitational results ===
Year	Division	Result
2022	Crossfit Women's	3rd
2023	Crossfit Women's	3rd

=== World Fitness Project results ===
Year	Division	Result
2025	Women's	3rd

== Diet and training ==
Lawson's training includes strength, skills, and interval training as well as longer aerobic workouts. She has stated that her training takes five to six hours per day, six days a week, in addition to a daily nighttime mobility routine. Even as a high school student, she maintained twice-daily workouts.

She is coached by former University of Waterloo hockey player Josh Woolley, Mammoth Training Methods and also has a swimming coach. She trains at CrossFit PSC in Kitchener with fellow CrossFit Games athlete Jack Farlow, as well as in her home gym.

She employs a nutrition coach and has stated that a key component of her diet is high-carb snacks like bagels and protein smoothies to ensure she has enough energy for the demands of her training schedule. She also takes quick-digesting foods during her longer aerobic workouts, such as apple sauce pouches, fig bars, and liquid carb supplements.
