= Dalva Allen =

American gridiron football player (1935–2016)

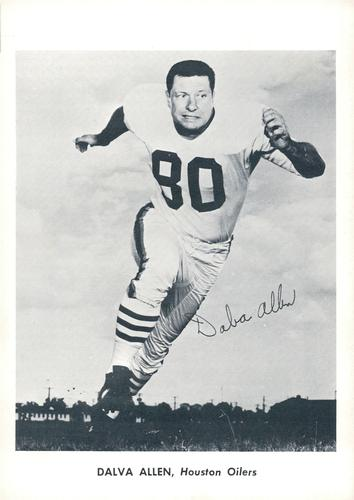

No. 66, 63, 76, 80
- Position: Defensive end

Personal information
- Born: January 13, 1935; Gonzales, Texas, U.S.
- Died: November 28, 2016 (aged 81); Houston, Texas, U.S.
- Listed height: 6 ft 4 in (1.93 m)
- Listed weight: 245 lb (111 kg)

Career information
- High school: Gonzales
- College: Houston (1953–1956)
- NFL draft: 1957: 23rd round, 267th overall pick

Career history
- Los Angeles Rams (1957)*; Toronto Argonauts (1957); Houston Oilers (1960–1961); Oakland Raiders (1962–1964)
- * Offseason or practice squad member only

Awards and highlights
- 2× AFL champion (1960, 1961)

Career AFL statistics
- Interceptions: 1
- Sacks: 18
- Stats at Pro Football Reference

Dalva Ray Allen (January 13, 1935 – November 28, 2016) was an American football defensive end player who played professionally in the American Football League (AFL). He played college football at the University of Houston. After being selected by the Los Angeles Rams in the 23rd round of the 1957 NFL draft, Allen played three games for the Toronto Argonauts in the Canadian Football League (CFL) during the 1957 season. He played for the Houston Oilers on their AFL championship teams in 1960 and 1961, and for the Oakland Raiders from 1962 through 1964.

== See also ==
- List of American Football League players
