= Gonzales High School (Texas) =

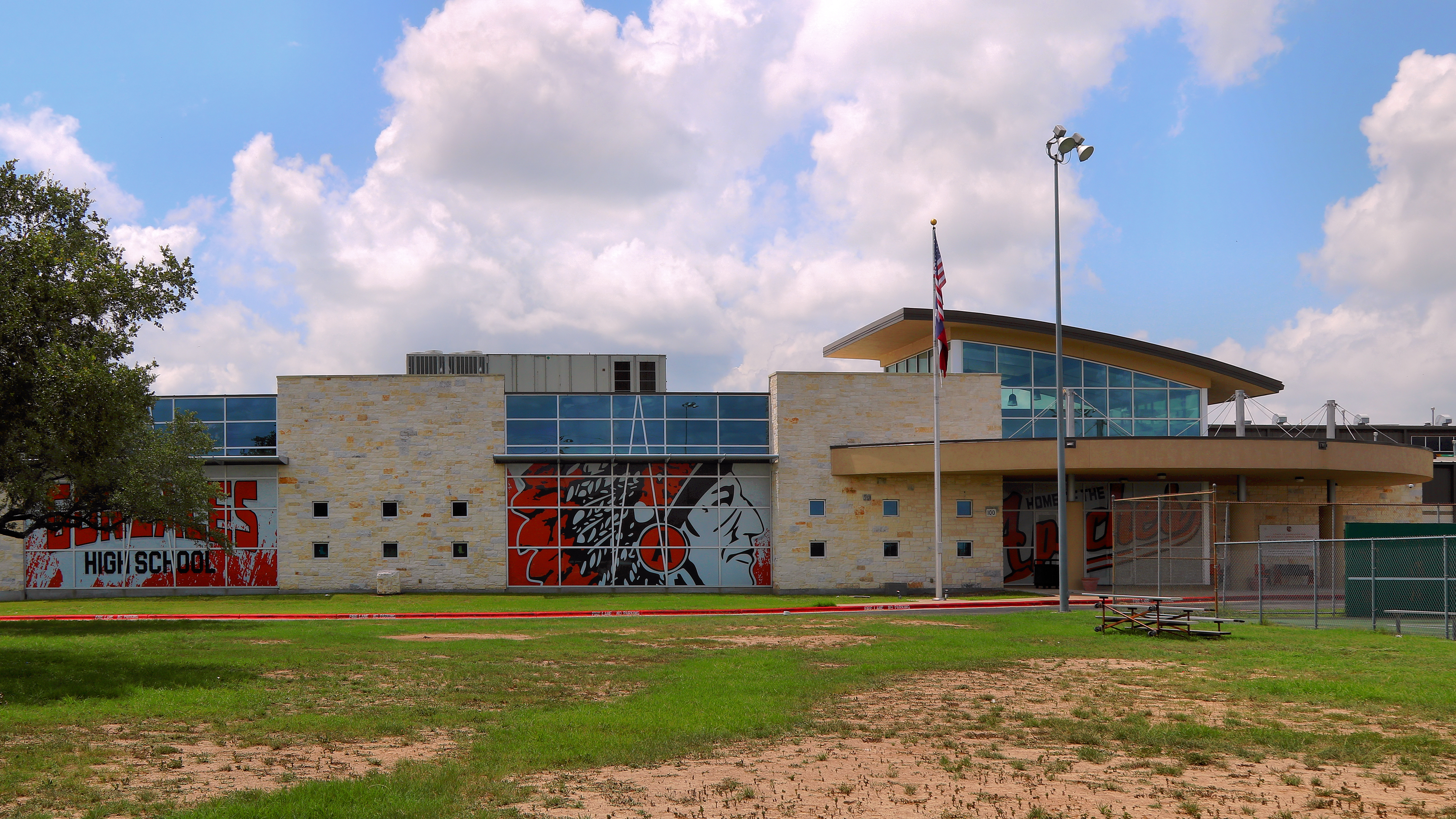

Location
- 1801 N Sarah Dewitt Dr. Gonzales, Texas 78629; United States; 29.52136°N 97.43894°W

Information
- School type: Public High School
- School district: Gonzales Independent School District
- NCES District ID: 4821060
- CEEB code: 442880
- NCES School ID: 482106002099
- Principal: Jon Basha
- Teaching staff: 66.80 (FTE)
- Grades: 9-12
- Enrollment: 744 (2025–2026)
- Student to teacher ratio: 11.38
- Colors: White & Orange
- Athletics conference: UIL Class 4A
- Mascot: Apaches
- Yearbook: Lexington
- Website: ghs.gonzalesisd.net

Gonzales High School is a 4A public high school located in Gonzales, Texas (USA). It is part of the Gonzales Independent School District located in central Gonzales County. In 2011, the school was rated "Academically Unacceptable" by the Texas Education Agency.

== Athletics ==
The Gonzales Apaches compete in the following sports:

Cross Country, Volleyball, Football, Basketball, Powerlifting, Golf, Tennis, Track, Softball & Baseball

=== State Titles ===
- Boys Basketball -
  - 1974(3A)
- Boys Cross Country -
  - 1991(3A), 1992(3A)
- Girls Golf -
  - 1989(3A)

== Notable alumni ==
- Dalva Allen, former NFL defensive end for the Houston Oilers and the Oakland Raiders
- Ariana Ince, Olympic javelin thrower
- Obert Logan, former NFL safety for the Dallas Cowboys and the New Orleans Saints
- Tom Sestak, former AFL defensive tackle for the Buffalo Bills
