= Verrett =

Verrett is a surname of French origin. Notable people with the surname include:

- Durek Verrett (born 1974), American businessman
- Harrison Verrett, American musician
- Jason Verrett (born 1991), American football player
- Logan Verrett (born 1990), American baseball player
- Shirley Verrett (1931–2010), American opera singer
- Stan Verrett, American sports announcer

== See also ==
- Verret (disambiguation)
