= Joe Verret =

Joe Verret (11 December 1945 – 30 March 2010) was an American Trotskyist who worked in civil rights in the South in the 1960s. Born in New Orleans, Verret was involved in founding the Spartacist League (US) in 1966, serving on the central committee. Prior to the formation of the Spartacist League, Verret was part of the American Socialist Organising Committee, which had split from the Socialist Party. Joe's Trotskyite work in the 1960s centred on New Orleans, involving the Southern Student Organizing Committee, the Student Nonviolent Coordinating Committee, and civil rights protests. Verret's activities were an element of the Louisiana Joint Legislative Committee on Un-American Activities Report 9, on "The Spartacist League and Certain Other Communist Activities in South Louisiana." Verret achieved full membership of the Spartacist League Central Committee in 1969. Also in 1969, despite being an anti-war activist, Verret was drafted. Following the Spartacist line on war, Verret accepted the draft in order to serve alongside fellow workers. Verret was involved in the G.I. Voice newsletter supporting soldiers taking a class war position against the US state. The US Army reacted to Verret's politics by making him serve unusually long training, and through placing him in desk work in Vietnam. In 1976 Verret moved to London and played a role in the founding of the Spartacist League/Britain in 1978. In 1979 Verret was elected a member of the International Executive Committee of the now International Communist League (Fourth Internationalist). He also served as National Chairman of the Trotskyist League of Canada in the 1970s and early 1980s. In 1981 Verret returned to the US, where he led the Atlanta Local of the Spartacist League from 1983 until 1996. In 1996 he moved to Los Angeles.

Verret left the Spartacist League in 2000 over a political matter, through continued work in left wing movements through being involved in the Prometheus Research Library. In 2009 the Spartacist League/US voted him honorary membership.
