= West Texas Rufneks =

American football team

- Founded: 1966
- Folded: 1970
- League: Texas Football League, Continental Football League
- Based in: Midland, Texas
- Arena: Memorial Stadium (Midland, Texas)
- Colors
- Championships: 0

The West Texas Rufneks were a professional American football team based in Midland, Texas. They began play as the Odessa-Midland Comets in the Texas Football League in 1966. In September 1968 the franchise was purchased by Dallas investor Alton Fairchild, who changed the team's name to the West Texas Rufneks. When the Texas Football League merged with the Continental Football League for its 1969 season, the Rufneks became a member of the COFL's new Texas Division East. The team announced plans to relocate after the 1969 season, but the move never happened and the Rufneks dissolved before the 1970 Texas Football League season.

== Season-by-season ==
| | Year | League | W | L | T | Finish | Coach |
|---|---|---|---|---|---|---|---|
| Odessa-Midland Comets | 1966 | Texas Football League | 1 | 8 | 1 | 6th | Byron Townsend |
| Odessa-Midland Comets | 1967 | Texas Football League | 3 | 11 | 0 | 3rd, Western Division | Jim Daniel |
| Odessa-Midland Comets/West Texas Rufneks | 1968 | Texas Football League | 5 | 7 | 0 | 3rd, Western Division | Jim Daniel/Ted Dawson |
| West Texas Rufneks | 1969 | Continental Football League | 7 | 4 | 0 | 2nd, Texas Division East | Lou Rymkus |
