= Texarkana Titans =

Pro football team in Texarkana, Texas (1967-71)

- Founded: 1967
- Folded: 1971
- League: Texas Football League, Continental Football League, Trans-American Football League
- Based in: Texarkana, Texas
- Arena: Grim Stadium (7,511)
- Championships: 0

The Texarkana Titans were a professional American football team based in Texarkana, Texas. They began play in 1967 as a member of the Southern Football League and by 1968 joined the Texas Football League (TFL), and became a member of the Continental Football League when the former merged operations with it in 1969. The Titans played in the TFL's championship game in 1968, losing 21–16 to the San Antonio Toros. After the Continental Football League dissolved in 1970, most of the Texas Division teams (including the Titans) returned to an autonomous TFL.

The Titans were just one of the four TFL franchises to remain in the league when it changed its name to the Trans-American Football League (TAFL) in late 1970. The Titans finished with the best record in the league but lost another championship game to the Toros, 20–19. The TAFL lasted just one season, after which it and the Titans ceased operations.

== Season-by-season ==
	Year	League	W	L	T	Finish	Coach
Texarkana Titans	1967	Southern Football League					Tom Collins
Texarkana Titans	1968	Texas Football League	7	5	0	1st, Eastern Division (Lost in the championship game)	Tom Collins
Texarkana Titans	1969	Continental Football League	7	5	0	1st, Texas Division West	Tom Collins / Jimmy Cobb
Texarkana Titans	1970	Texas Football League	7	3	0	2nd, TFL	Durwood Merrill
Texarkana Titans	1971	Trans-American Football League	5	0	0	1st, TAFL (Lost in the championship game)	M.C. Reynolds
