= Farrington Field =

Stadium in Fort Worth, Texas

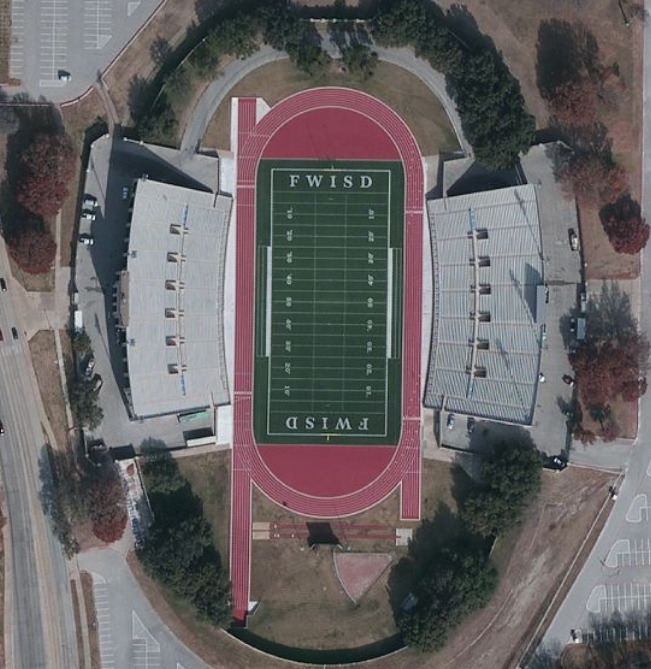
- Farrington Field in Fort Worth, Texas
- Interactive map of Farrington Field
- Location: 1501 N. University Dr. Fort Worth, Texas
- Coordinates: 32.745743°N 97.360218°W
- Owner: Fort Worth ISD
- Capacity: 18,500
- Surface: artificial
- Record attendance: 24,836 (November 23, 1944 North Side H.S. vs. Paschal H.S.)

Construction
- Built: 1938–1939
- Opened: November 3, 1939
- Renovated: 2010
- Cost: $400,000
- Architect: Preston M. Geren
- General contractors: General Construction Co., Fort Worth

Tenants
- Fort Worth public schools (1939-present); Fort Worth Braves (1967-1971); Texas Wesleyan University football (2017-present); Fort Worth Vaqueros FC (2018-present)

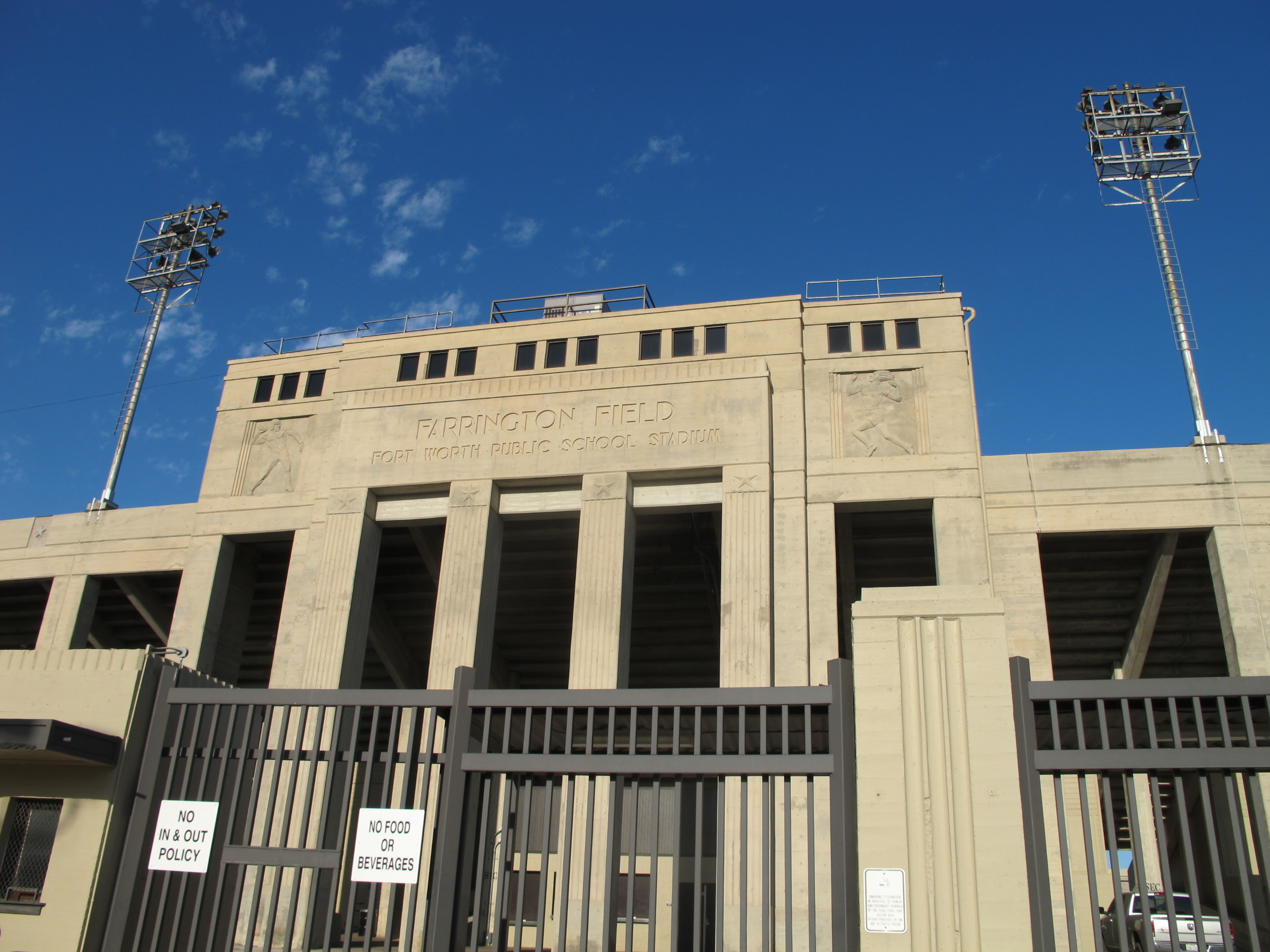
Farrington Field Exterior

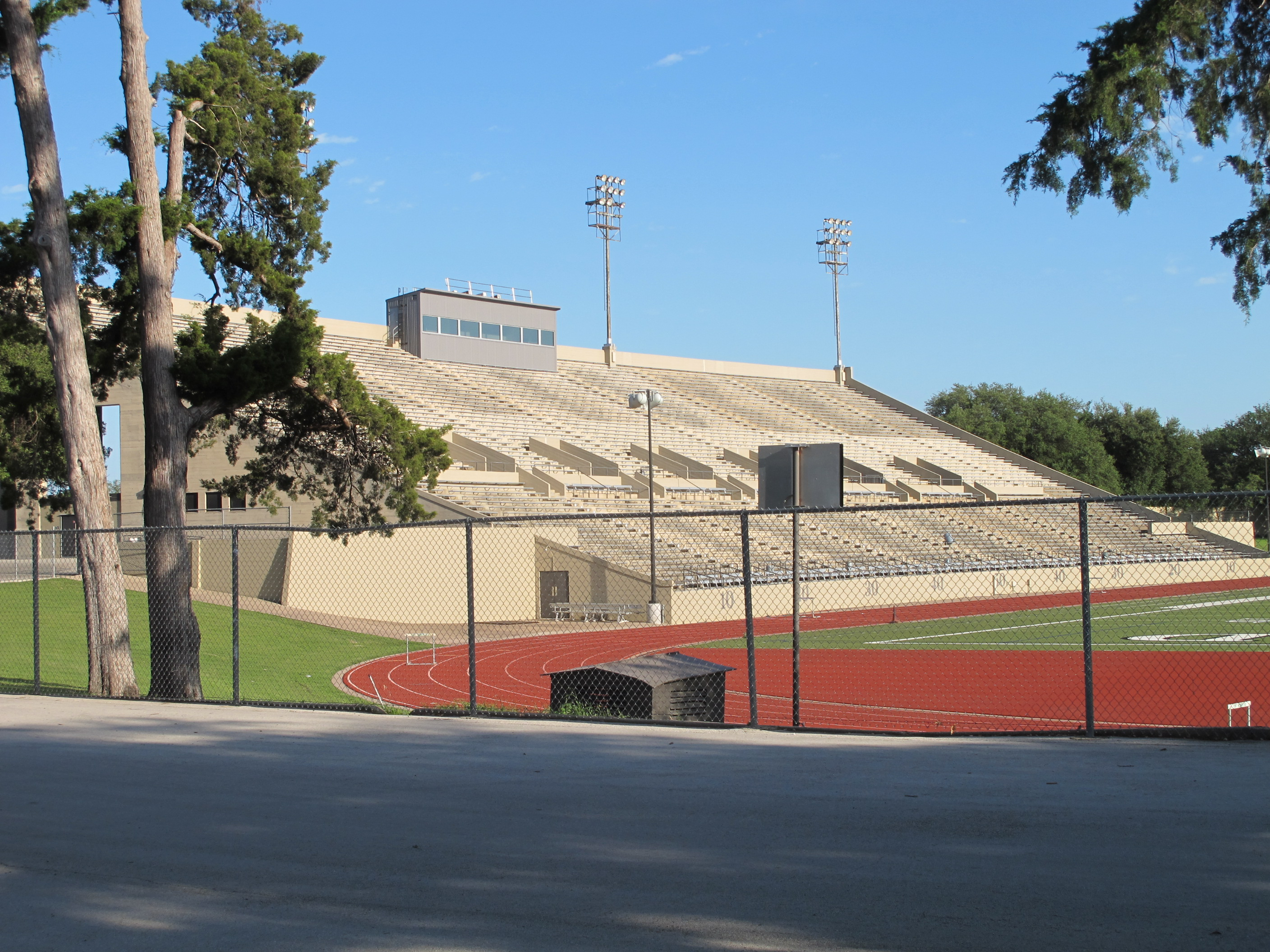
Farrington Field Grandstand

Farrington Field is an 18,500-capacity multi-use stadium located in Fort Worth, Texas. Designed by Preston M. Geren, the stadium was financed with federal funds from the WPA and a local contribution from the school district. Designed in the PWA/Classical style of modern architecture, the stadium was completed in 1939 and was named in memory of E.S. Farrington, a long time superintendent of the Fort Worth Independent School District. In 1986 local preservationists succeeded in preserving the stadium. The stadium is the 2nd largest in Fort Worth proper and is used mainly for football and track & field.

In February 2021, the parking lots of the stadium were used to stage a drive-through COVID-19 vaccination site.

The field recently underwent a returfing along with the other FWISD owned football stadiums in 2022.
