= Fort Worth Braves =

American football team

- Founded: 1967
- Folded: 1970
- League: Texas Football League, Continental Football League, Trans-American Football League
- Based in: Fort Worth, Texas
- Arena: Farrington Field
- Colors
- Championships: 0

The Fort Worth Braves were a professional American football team based in Fort Worth, Texas. The team, first known as the Fort Worth Texans, was announced in 1967 as a member of the Texas Football League, and played their 1967 home games at Turnpike Stadium. The franchise was renamed as the Braves and moved its home games to Farrington Field for the 1968 season. In 1969 the Braves, along with the rest of the TFL, joined the Continental Football League as part of its new Texas Division.

When the COFL folded after its 1969 season the Braves returned as part of a fully autonomous, six-team TFL. The 1970 Braves made the postseason and advanced to the TFL title game, where they lost 21-17 to the San Antonio Toros. The Braves were just one of the four TFL franchises to remain in the league when it changed its name to the Trans-American Football League (TAFL) in late 1970. The TAFL lasted just one season, after which it and the Braves ceased operations.

== Season-by-season ==
	Year	League	W	L	T	Finish	Coach
Fort Worth Texans	1967	Texas Football League	5	9	0	2nd, Western Division	John Hatley
Fort Worth Braves	1968	Texas Football League	10	2	0	2nd, Western Division	John Hatley
Fort Worth Braves	1969	Continental Football League	5	7	0	3rd, Texas Division West	John Hatley
Fort Worth Braves	1970	Texas Football League	6	6	0	3rd, TFL	Duncan McCauley
Fort Worth Texans	1971	Trans-American Football League	1	4	0	3rd, TAFL	Duncan McCauley
