= Texas Football League =

Minor American football league

- Sport: American football
- Founded: 1966
- Folded: 1971
- Claim to fame: First spring minor pro football league
- No. of teams: Varied (4 to 8)
- Countries: United States
- Last champion: San Antonio Toros
- Most titles: San Antonio Toros (4)

The Texas Football League (TFL) was a low-level American football minor league that operated in primarily in the United States from 1966 through 1968, and again between 1970 and 1971 as a new incarnation called the Trans-American Football League (TAFL).

The 1971 season of the TAFL was the first season of spring pro football in United States, which made it the first spring pro football league.

== History ==
The league, which initially comprised six franchises from Texas and Oklahoma, was formally announced in May 1966. The league was supposed to begin with eight teams, but entries from Hammond, Louisiana and New Orleans were not accepted. With the addition of two franchises in 1967, the TFL expanded to two four-team divisions.

During the 1967-68 offseason the Continental Football League offered a merger of operations with the TFL, but was turned down by TFL commissioner George Schepps. He additionally challenged the CoFL to pit its champion against the TFL's champion for the 1968 campaign.

On January 25, 1969, it was announced that the Continental Football League was adding the entirety of the eight-team TFL to its ranks. The TFL joined as a separate entity and was placed into the new Texas Division (itself split into East and West). The TFL teams were mostly scheduled to play against each other but did also play interleague contests. Joining the Texas division was the Mexico Golden Aztecs, the first American football franchise based in Mexico. The TFL's San Antonio Toros defeated the Indianapolis Capitols, 44–38 in overtime, to capture the last Continental League championship. (The Toros would ultimately win four straight league titles from 1967 to 1971.)

=== 1966 ===
W = Wins, L = Losses, T = Ties, PCT= Winning Percentage, PF= Points For, PA = Points Against

y = Division Champion

Texas Football League
Team	W	L	T	PCT	PF	PA	Stadium	Coach
Tulsa Oilers	7	2	1	.778	246	161	Skelly Stadium	Floyd Harrawood
Sherman-Denison Jets	7	3	0	.700	254	161	Bearcat Stadium	Duncan McCauley
Pasadena Pistols	7	3	0	.700	284	149	Memorial Stadium	Donnie Caraway
Burkburnett Kings	4	6	0	.400	152	298	Burkburnett High School Stadium	E.J. Webb
Dallas County Rockets	3	7	0	.300	127	181	Eagle Stadium	Bill Crow/Joe Verret
Odessa-Midland Comets	1	8	1	.111	83	196	W.T. Barrett Stadium	Byron Townsend

=== 1967 ===
W = Wins, L = Losses, T = Ties, PCT= Winning Percentage, PF= Points For, PA = Points Against

y = Division Champion

Eastern Division
Team	W	L	T	PCT	PF	PA	Stadium	Coach
San Antonio Toros	14	0	0	1.000	538	137	North East Stadium	Duncan McCauley
Pasadena Pistols	8	6	0	.571	417	383	Auxiliary Stadium	Donnie Caraway
Dallas Rockets	8	6	0	.571	285	324	Jesuit High School Stadium	Joe Verret
Sherman-Denison Jets	5	9	0	.357	360	424	n/a	Gene Babb
Western Division
Team	W	L	T	PCT	PF	PA	Stadium	Coach
Tulsa Thunderbirds	10	4	0	.714	320	276	Skelly Stadium	Art Ramage
Fort Worth Texans	5	9	0	.357	346	364	Turnpike Stadium	Johnny Hatley
Odessa-Midland Comets	3	11	0	.214	247	411	W.T. Barrett Stadium	Jim Daniel
Wichita Falls Kings	3	11	0	.214	255	449	Midwestern University Stadium	E.J. Webb

=== 1968 ===
W = Wins, L = Losses, T = Ties, PCT= Winning Percentage, PF= Points For, PA = Points Against

y = Division Champion

Eastern Division
Team	W	L	T	PCT	PF	PA	Stadium	Coach
Texarkana Titans	7	5	0	.583	273	277	Grim Stadium	Tom Collins
Tulsa Thunderbirds	4	8	0	.333	171	156	Auxiliary Stadium	Art Ramage
Dallas Rockets	4	8	0	.333	249	354	Jesuit High School Stadium	Joe Verret
Beaumont Golden Vikings	2	10	0	.167	165	365	Greenie Stadium	Roy Davidson
Western Division
Team	W	L	T	PCT	PF	PA	Stadium	Coach
San Antonio Toros	11	1	0	.917	447	121	Alamo Stadium	Duncan McCauley/Hoover Evans
Fort Worth Braves	10	2	0	.833	377	154	Farrington Field	Johnny Hatley
Odessa Comets/West Texas Rufneks	5	7	0	.417	235	338	W.T. Barrett Stadium	Jim Daniel/Ted Dawson
El Paso Jets	5	7	0	.417	197	349	Dudley Field	Harold Stephens

== Trans-American Football League ==
With the dissolution of the CoFL in early 1970, the Toros announced the formation of the Trans-American Football League, hoping to add teams in a number of major markets; the TAFL planned teams in Birmingham; Tampa; Hershey, Pennsylvania and even Los Angeles, in addition to San Antonio and existing Continental teams in Chicago, Dallas-Fort Worth and Memphis (relocated from Las Vegas). By the time the league played its 1970 season, it was once again mainly based in Texas, with two other Continental teams, the Omaha Mustangs and Texarkana Titans, joining the loop.

In 1971, the Trans-American Football League took the unusual step of becoming the first football league to schedule and play all of its games in the spring rather than the autumn, a move that attracted the attention of Sports Illustrated pro football columnist Tex Maule. The 1971 TAFL season ran from April 25 to June 26 . Although Maule commented that the Trans-American league's four teams' Fort Worth to San Antonio lineup "barely makes it Trans-Texas", he also noted that "This is the first bona fide attempt to play spring football," a gimmick that the United States Football League did on a larger scale a decade later.

On the other hand, attendance for the four teams "reached a new low" and, as sports historian Bob Gill would note in 2002, "it was clear by mid-June that the concept of spring football was dead -- and probably the Texas League along with it". The TAFL folded after its spring 1971 season.

=== 1970 ===
W = Wins, L = Losses, T = Ties, PCT= Winning Percentage, PF= Points For, PA = Points Against

y = Division Champion

Texas Football League
Team	W	L	T	PCT	PF	PA	Stadium	Coach
San Antonio Toros	7	2	0	.800	288	158	Harlandale Memorial Stadium	George Pasterchick
Texarkana Titans	7	3	0	.700	323	175	Grim Stadium	Durwood Merrill
Fort Worth Braves	6	4	0	.600	365	266	Farrington Field	Duncan McCauley
Omaha Mustangs	5	4	0	.556	228	240	Johnny Rosenblatt Stadium	Don Fleming
Bartlesville Quickicks	3	7	0	.300	185	289	Custer Field	Art Ramage
Dallas Rockets	1	9	0	.100	97	358	Roffino Stadium	Joe Verret

=== 1971 ===
W = Wins, L = Losses, T = Ties, PCT= Winning Percentage, PF= Points For, PA = Points Against

y = Division Champion

Trans-American Football League
Team	W	L	T	PCT	PF	PA	Stadium	Coach
Texarkana Titans	5	0	0	1.000	171	71	n/a	n/a
San Antonio Toros	4	1	0	.800	174	76	North East Stadium	George Pasterchick
Fort Worth Braves	1	4	0	.200	89	171	Handley Field	n/a
Dallas Rockets	0	5	0	.000	56	172	P. C. Cobb Stadium	n/a

=== Championship games ===
Season	Date	Winning team	Score	Losing team	Venue	Attendance
1966	December 3, 1966	Tulsa Oilers	30-27	Sherman-Denison Jets	Skelly Stadium	426
1967	December 2, 1967	San Antonio Toros	27-7	Tulsa Thunderbirds	North East Stadium	4,381
1968	December 7, 1968	San Antonio Toros	21-16	Texarkana Titans	Alamo Stadium	4.661
1969	The league merged with the Continental Football League for the 1969 season. San Antonio beat Texarkana 20-7 for the "Texas Division Title"					
1970	November 21, 1970	San Antonio Toros	21-17	Fort Worth Braves	Harlandale Memorial Stadium	5,523
1971	June 19, 1971	San Antonio Toros	20-19	Texarkana Titans	North East Stadium	4,500

== Southwest Professional Football League ==
After the collapse of the Trans-American Football League the two better financed teams—the San Antonio Toros and the Dallas Rockets—formed a new league called the Southwest Professional Football League (SWPFL), and moved the season back to the fall. The league commissioner was Pro Football Hall of Famer Ollie Matson, but the SWPFL operated on a much smaller budget than previous related leagues, and disbanded after only two seasons.

=== 1972 ===
Southwestern Football League
Team	W	L	T	Pct.	PF	PA	Notes
San Antonio Toros	8	0	0	1.000	259	78	Champions
Las Vegas Casinos	6	2	0	.750	159	94	
Phoenix Blazers	6	4	0	.600	240	230	
Southern California Razorbacks	4	3	0	.571	n/a	n/a	
Dallas Rockets	1	5	0	.166	n/a	n/a	
Los Angeles Mustangs	0	6	0	.000	83	150	

=== 1973 ===
After the first season the SWPFL approached to the Canadian Football League to become an "American branch league of the CFL". The league even sent representative to the CFL league meeting, which were "receptive to the idea", but the SWPFL did not survive long enough to see it come to fruition.

Eastern Division
Team	W	L	T	Pct.	PF	PA
Oklahoma City Wranglers	9	1	0	.900	442	110
San Antonio Toros	6	2	0	.750	239	170
Albuquerque Thunderbirds	4	4	0	.500	212	173
Denver Oilers	1	7	0	.125	87	372
Kansas City Steers	0	3	0	.000	19	139
Western Division
Team	W	L	T	Pct.	PF	PA
Las Vegas Casinos	6	2	0	.750	192	129
Phoenix Blazers	6	3	0	.666	217	181
Southern California Razorbacks	3	6	0	.333	164	147
Los Angeles Mustangs	1	8	0	.111	128	221

Semifinals:San Antonio Toros 45 vs. Las Vegas Casinos 3

Finals:Oklahoma City Wranglers 19 vs. San Antonio Toros 16

=== Aftermath ===
The Toros continued to exist into 1974 season and joined the semi-pro Mid-America Football League, and even playing an exhibition game against the Houston Oilers on July 16. Because of a players' strike, the Oilers played with an all-rookie roster, narrowly defeating the Toros 13–7 in a much more competitive match than most NFL vs. non-NFL matches were at the time.

== See also ==
- List of leagues of American football
