= North Pacific Football League =

- Sport: Football
- Founded: 1963
- Folded: 1966
- Claim to fame: The 2nd football league to operate teams in both the United States and Canada
- No. of teams: Varied (4 to 10)
- Country: United States; Canada
- Last champion: Seattle Ramblers
- Most titles: Edmonds Warriors (2)
- Related competitions: Continental Football League

The North Pacific Football League is the collaboration name for two separate but related minor American football leagues - the Pacific Football League and Northern California League - that operated in the Pacific Northwest region, between 1963 and 1966. The leagues published combined all-star team every year, but there was no inter-league or playoff play, except the 1966 season, when both league champions played for the "Pacific Coast Championship".

The leagues supplied five of the seven members of the Continental Football League "Pacific Division", resulting in leagues disbandment after the 1966 season. It was the second football league (after the United Football League) to operate teams in both the United States and Canada.

== History ==
The Pacific Football League had a special "8-Point rule", stated that if a team was trailing by eight or more points, they could receive a kickoff from their opponent rather than kickoff. The league commissioner was former Hollywood Stars player Joe Huston with involvement of Frank Leahy Jr. during the 1966 season.

The North Pacific Football League featured some notable names, including former Washington Redskins WR Hugh Smith, future Oakland Raiders Chon Gallegos (1965 NCL MVP), Grey Cup champion Pete Ohler, Kermit Jorgensen (two-time league MVP), former Oregon Ducks stars Mike Brundage and Paul Burleson, Raye Renfro and future Humboldt State Lumberjacks football head coach Mike Dolby.

After the 1966 season Eugene Bombers, Sacramento Lancers, San Jose Apaches, Seattle Ramblers and Victoria Steelers joined the newly formed Continental Football League "Pacific Division". Portland Thunderbirds declined an opportunity to join the CoFL due to financial concerns. A separate Portland franchise, the Loggers, would eventually take the Thunderbirds' place in the CoFL.

In 1970, the CoFL fractured, leaving only the four teams in the former North Pacific territory. Sacramento (by then known as the Capitols) was selling season tickets for a potential 1970 season. The failure of that season ticket drive along with Portland's closure led to the two remaining teams (Spokane and Seattle) deciding that there were not enough teams to make such a venture worthwhile, and the proposal was abandoned.

=== 1963 ===
North Pacific Football League
Team	W	L	T	Pct.	PF	PA	Notes
Tacoma Tyees	8	0	0	1.000	163	83	Declared Champions
Edmonds Warriors	3	5	0	.375	100	116	
Portland Thunderbirds	2	5	0	.285	104	96	
Seattle Ramblers	2	5	0	.285	54	127	

=== 1964 ===
The Bellingham Jets dropped out of the league mid-season and forfeited the last four games.

North Pacific Football League
Team	W	L	T	Pct.	PF	PA	Notes
Edmonds Warriors	10	0	0	1.000	265	42	Declared Champions
Tacoma Tyees	7	3	0	.700	240	82	
Portland Thunderbirds	6	3	0	.667	189	134	
Forth Lewis Rangers	6	4	0	.600	193	99	
Seattle Ramblers	2	6	0	.250	40	157	
Spokane Volunteers	1	8	0	.111	20	312	
Bellingham Jets	0	8	0	.000	20	134	Folded

=== 1965 ===
It was the first year that two leagues coexist. Edmonds Warriors finished first in the PFL and San Jose Apaches won NCL title after beating Redwood City Ramblers in the league final. Kermit Jorgensen (RB, Edmonds) and Chon Gallegos (QB, San Jose) won their respective league MVP titles. Frank Leahy Jr., son of the former Notre Dame coach, was appointed head coach for Lake Oswego Thunderbirds.

The North Pacific Football League changed its name to Northwest International Football League after adding Canada's Vancouver Kats. Alas, the Kats disbanded mid-season failing to score in any league games, became Rugby club and forfeited the last four games.

Northwest International Football League
Team	W	L	T	Pct.	PF	PA	Notes
Edmonds Warriors	9	0	0	1.000	238	46	Declared Champions
Lake Oswego Thunderbirds	6	3	0	.667	227	87	
Tacoma Tyees	3	6	0	.333	53	167	
Vancouver Kats	0	9	0	.000	0	216	Disbanded

Northern California League
Team	W	L	T	Pct.	PF	PA
San Jose Apaches	9	1	0	.900	271	65
Redwood City Ramblers	9	1	0	.900	298	90
Sacramento Lancers	5	5	0	.500	161	197
Oroville Beavers	2	7	1	.250	118	201
Hayward Hawks	2	7	1	.250	171	286
Eureka Foresters	2	8	0	.200	130	312

NCL Championship Game: San Jose 7, Redwood City 6

=== 1966 ===
Portland Thunderbirds signed a working agreement with the Denver Broncos for players development.

Pacific Football League
Team	W	L	T	Pct.	PF	PA	Notes
Seattle Ramblers	9	0	0	1.000	216	60	Declared Champions*
Eugene Bombers	7	3	0	.778	271	153	
Portland Thunderbirds	4	5	0	.444	133	135	
Tacoma Tyees	2	6	1	.250	95	214	
Edmonds Warriors	2	6	1	.250	120	143	
Victoria Steelers	2	7	0	.222	132	237	

^{*} The Bombers chose not to play the 1966 PFL playoffs due to financial concerns.

Northern California League
Team	W	L	T	Pct.	PF	PA	Notes
San Jose Apaches	12	0	0	1.000	238	46	Declared Champions
Hayward Hawks	6	3	0	.667	227	87	
Sacramento Lancers	3	6	0	.333	53	167	
Oroville Beavers	0	9	0	.000	0	216	

Pacific Coast Championship Game
Pacific Football League vs. Northern California League
Seattle Ramblers 48, San Jose Apaches 13
Kermit Jorgensen (RB, Seattle) won the Northern Pacific Football League MVP title.

== See also ==
- Continental Football League
- Pacific Coast Professional Football League
