= Charlie Green (American football) =

American football player (born 1943)

No. 12
- Position: Quarterback

Personal information
- Born: March 14, 1943 (age 83); Dayton, Ohio, U.S.
- Listed height: 6 ft 0 in (1.83 m)
- Listed weight: 190 lb (86 kg)

Career information
- High school: Milton-Union (West Milton, Ohio)
- College: Wittenberg
- AFL draft: 1965: 13th round, 103rd overall pick

Career history
- Boston Patriots (1965)*; Boston Sweepers (1965); Oakland Raiders (1966); San Jose Apaches (1967); Denver Broncos (1969)*
- * Offseason or practice squad member only

Awards and highlights
- First-team Little All-American (1964); 2× OAC back of the year (1963, 1964); 2× AP small-college national champion (1963, 1964)
- Stats at Pro Football Reference
- College Football Hall of Fame

Charles H. Green (born March 14, 1943) is an American former professional football player who was a quarterback in the American Football League (AFL). He played college football for the Wittenberg Tigers. From 1962 to 1964, he led Wittenberg to three consecutive Ohio Athletic Conference (OAC) championships and three consecutive undefeated seasons (25–0–1), including an Associated Press small college national championship in 1964. After the 1964 season, he was selected as the first-team quarterback on the Little All-America team.

He also played professional football for the Oakland Raiders in 1966. He was inducted into the College Football Hall of Fame in 2002.

== Early life ==
Green grew up in West Milton, Ohio, located 15 miles (24 km) northwest of Dayton. He played high school football at Milton-Union High School, leading the team to a 10–0 record as a senior.

== Wittenberg ==
Green enrolled at Wittenberg University in 1961 as "a scrawny, 145-pound (66 kg) youngster." While at Wittenberg, he grew 2 inches (51 mm) and gained 25 pounds (11 kg).

He became Wittenberg's starting quarterback as a sophomore, leading the 1962 Wittenberg Tigers football team to a perfect 9–0 record, an OAC championship, and the No. 2 spot in the final Associated Press (AP) small college poll. During the 1962 season, Green completed 79 of 147 passes for 1,227 yards with 15 touchdowns and seven interceptions. He was selected by the AP as the first-team quarterback on the 1962 All-OAC football team.

As a junior, he led the 1963 Wittenberg football team to an 8–0–1, an OAC championship, and the No. 3 spot in the final AP small college football poll. Green had his best statistical showing in 1963, completing 114 of 182 passes for 2,181 yards, 19 touchdowns, eight interceptions and a 188.9 passing efficiency rating. He set OAC season records for completions (114), passing yards (2,181), and total offense (2,224 yards), and also set an OAC single-game record with 411 passing yards against Heidelberg. For the second consecutive year, he was selected by the AP as the first-team quarterback on the All-OAC team. He was also voted by the conference coaches as the best back in the OAC. His top receiver, Bobby Cherry, was named best lineman in the OAC.

As a senior, he led the 1964 Wittenberg Tigers to its third consecutive OAC championship with a perfect 8–0 record. The Tigers were again ranked No. 1 in the AP's final small college football poll. During the 1964 season, Green completed 117 of 198 passes for 1,811 yards, 21 touchdowns and 12 interceptions. At the end of the season, he again received the award as the best back in the OAC. He was also selected as the first-team quarterback on the 1964 Little All-America college football team.

Sports Illustrated ran a feature story on Wittenberg's football team in November 1964 and noted Green's popularity: "[M]ention the name of Charlie Green and you will be saluted by a peal of bells from every one of the town's 143 churches." The magazine also praised Green's ability:

Green undoubtedly is the year's best small-college quarterback and possibly one of the best in any category—big or small. His most imposing credential is a right arm that can get rid of a football so rapidly and with such accuracy that one opposing coach insists he is being aimed by an IBM computer.

At the end of his playing career at Wittenberg, he held 14 OAC conference records, including the career records for passing yards (5,575) and touchdown passes (61).

Green also handled punting for Wittenberg and played for the school's baseball and basketball teams. He was the most valuable player on the baseball team, compiling a 0.67 earned run average in 1964.

== Professional football ==
Green was selected by the Boston Patriots in the 13th round of the 1965 AFL draft. He spent the 1965 season on Boston's taxi squad. He also played in 1965 for the Boston Sweepers, leading them to the North Atlantic semi-pro league championship.

In March 1966, he was acquired by the Oakland Raiders. During the 1966 season, he served as the Raiders' third-string quarterback, behind Tom Flores and Cotton Davidson. He appeared in 14 games, none as a starter, and completed both of his pass attempts for a total of 17 yards.

In 1967, the Raiders acquired two new quarterbacks, Daryle Lamonica and George Blanda. In late August 1967, the team placed Green on waivers and, when he was unclaimed, sent him to the San Jose Apaches of the Pacific Coast Division of the Continental Football League. He played the 1967 season with the Apaches, sharing quarterback duties with Chon Gallegos. The Apaches were coached in 1967 by Bill Walsh.

Green returned to the Raiders for their 1968 training camp. However, he did not make the Raiders' final roster for the 1968 season. The following year, he tried out with the Denver Broncos but was released in July 1969.

== Later years and honors ==
In the mid-1980s, Green was living in Phoenix, Arizona, working as a funding specialist for Merchant Banking Services. He later worked in the insurance business. He was also active in the National Guard Youth ChalleNGe Program in Arizona. His son Tyler Green was a pitcher for the Philadelphia Phillies in the 1990s.

Green, his coach Bill Edwards, and his top receiver Bob Cherry were among the first 12 people inducted into the Wittenberg University Athletics Hall of Honor when it was established in 1985.

He was inducted into the College Football Hall of Fame in 2002. He was the first Wittenberg player to be inducted into the Hall.

In 2017, he was ranked No. 3 by the Springfield News-Sun on its list of the top football players in Wittenberg history. (Canadian Football Hall of Fame inductee Ron Lancaster took the No. 1 spot.)
