= Jim Ferguson (American football) =

American football player (born 1942)

No. 64, 51, 56, 59, 58
- Positions: Center, linebacker

Personal information
- Born: October 15, 1942 (age 84); Oakland, California, U.S.
- Listed height: 6 ft 4 in (1.93 m)
- Listed weight: 240 lb (109 kg)

Career information
- High school: Excelsior (Norwalk, California)
- College: Cerritos JC (1963–1964); USC (1965–1966)
- NFL draft: 1968: 17th round, 439th overall pick

Career history
- Long Beach Admirals (1967); Sacramento Buccaneers (1967); New Orleans Saints (1968); Seattle Rangers (1968); Atlanta Falcons (1969); Chicago Bears (1969); Los Angeles Rams (1971)

Career NFL statistics
- Games played: 10
- Games started: 2
- Stats at Pro Football Reference

James Thomas Ferguson (born October 15, 1942) is an American former professional football player who was a center for two seasons in the National Football League (NFL) with the New Orleans Saints, Atlanta Falcons and Chicago Bears. He played college football for the USC Trojans, and was selected by the Saints in the 17th round of the 1968 NFL/AFL draft. He was also a member of the Los Angeles Rams of the NFL and the Long Beach Admirals, Sacramento Buccaneers and Seattle Rangers of the Continental Football League (COFL).

== Early life and college ==
James Thomas Ferguson was born on October 15, 1942, in Oakland, California. He attended Excelsior High School in Norwalk, California.

Ferguson played college football at Cerritos Junior College from 1963 to 1964. He was then a member of the USC Trojans of the University of Southern California from 1965 to 1966. He was a letterman in 1966. In March 1967, it was reported that Ferguson had dropped out of college.

== Professional career ==
During the 1967 season, Ferguson played in the Continental Football League (COFL) for the Long Beach Admirals and Sacramento Buccaneers.

Ferguson was selected by the New Orleans Saints in the 17th round, with the 439th overall pick, of the 1968 NFL draft. He played in four games for the Saints in 1968. He spent part of the season on the taxi squad. Ferguson was also a member of the Seattle Rangers of the COFL in 1968.

On July 2, 1969, the Saints traded Ferguson, Roy Schmidt, and Jerry Jones to the Atlanta Falcons for Errol Linden and Don Talbert. Ferguson appeared in two games, both starts, for the Falcons during the 1969 season before being waived in early October.

Ferguson was claimed off waivers by the Chicago Bears on October 2, 1969. He played in four games for the Bears in 1969. He was waived in 1970.

Ferguson signed with the Los Angeles Rams in 1971. He was placed on injured reserve in September 1971.

== Personal life ==
Ferguson's brother, Earl Ferguson, also played collegiately at Cerritos Junior College and professionally in the COFL.
