= Veterans Memorial Stadium (Long Beach) =

Stadium in Long Beach, California

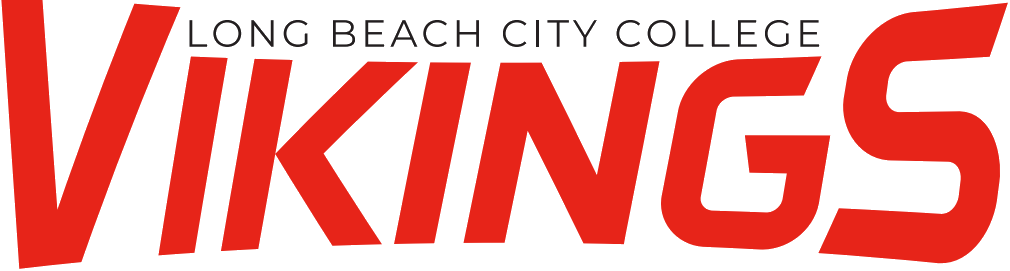

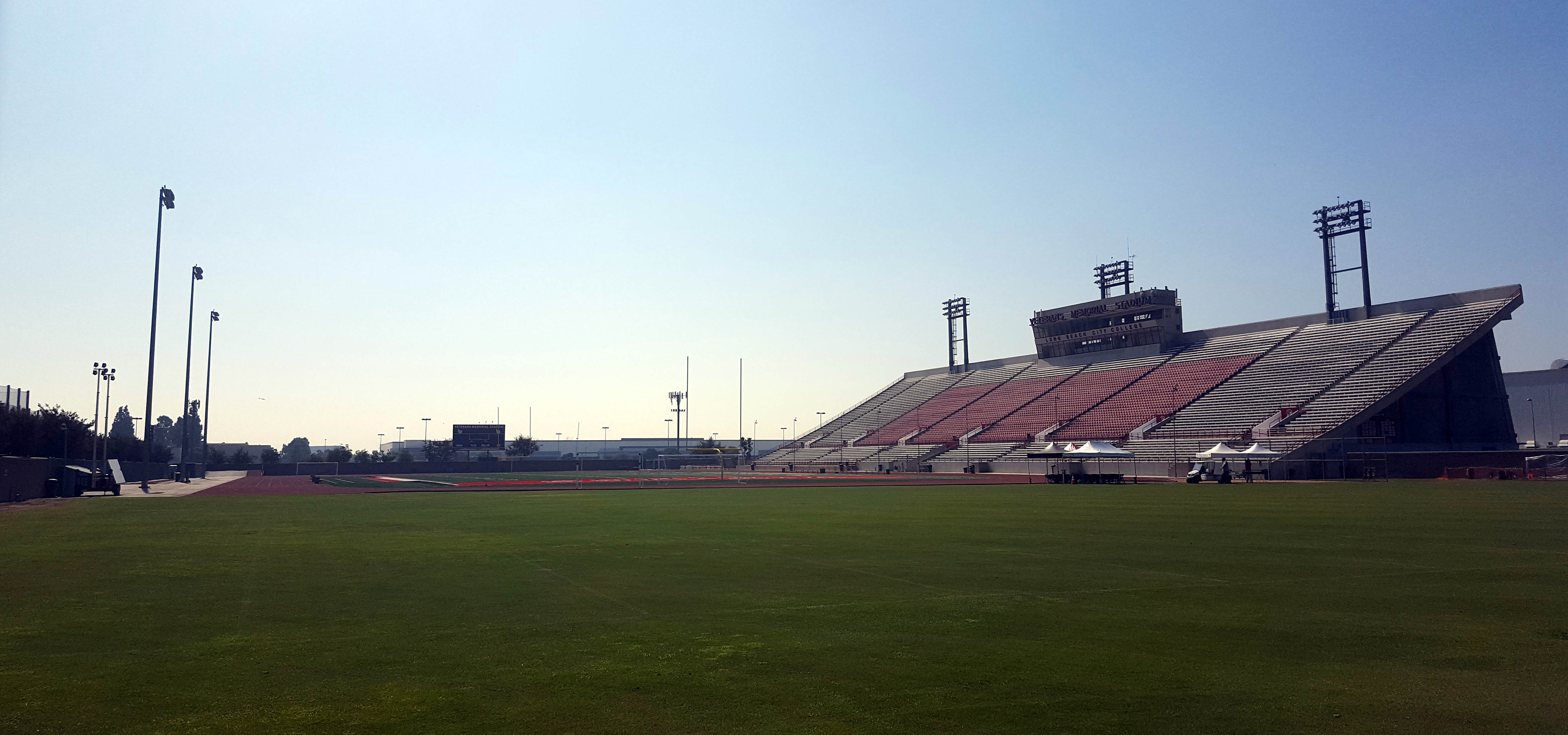
- The stadium as seen in 2017
- Interactive map of Veterans Memorial Stadium
- Address: Lew Davis St. Long Beach, CA; United States
- Coordinates: 33°49′41.66″N 118°8′10.13″W
- Owner: Long Beach City College
- Operator: Long Beach City College Athletics
- Capacity: 11,600
- Type: Stadium
- Surface: SprinTurf
- Current use: Football; Soccer

Construction
- Opened: 1950; 76 years ago

Tenants
- Long Beach City College men's and women's soccer; Los Angeles Force (NISA); California Interscholastic Federation; Long Beach Admirals (COFL) (1967); Long Beach State (NCAA) football (1955–1976, 1983–1992)

Website
- lbcc.edu/veterans-stadium

Veterans Memorial Stadium (also known as Veterans Stadium, Vets Stadium or simply The Vet) is an 11,600-seat stadium used mostly for football and soccer games, located south of the Liberal Arts Campus of Long Beach City College in Long Beach, California. It is the home stadium to a number of local area high school football teams, as well as Long Beach City College's football team. It was also home to Long Beach State's football team until the program disbanded in 1991. The Los Angeles Force use the stadium for soccer matches. The stadium is also popular as a movie set for a number of Hollywood motion pictures. It also hosted the 1985 and 1988 Motorcycle Speedway World Team Cup Finals. The stadium is scheduled to be demolished at the end of August 2026 to make room for a modern replacement scheduled for completion in 2029.

== History ==
Veterans Stadium opened in 1950, and was owned by the City of Long Beach for nearly four decades. The city used the stadium as a temporary location for Fire Station 19 (now located on Clark Avenue, a few blocks away). The fire station was housed at the south end of the stadium under the bleacher area, and the large door that was installed for the fire engine to exit can still be seen. The station itself (or living quarters area) is now used as an office for stadium personnel.

Two years before the Vet was opened, pro football came to Long Beach when the Los Angeles Bulldogs of the Pacific Coast Professional Football League became the Long Beach Bulldogs for the 1948 season. The minor-league PCPFL was on its last legs by this time, and so were the Bulldogs, a legendary West Coast team that had fallen on hard times since the NFL's Los Angeles Rams had relocated from Cleveland, and the AAFC was formed with the Los Angeles Dons. After drawing just 850 fans for a Bulldogs game at Stephen's Field on the campus of Wilson High School in Long Beach on October 17, 1948, the Bulldogs promptly cancelled the rest of their schedule, and they and the PCPFL folded soon after.

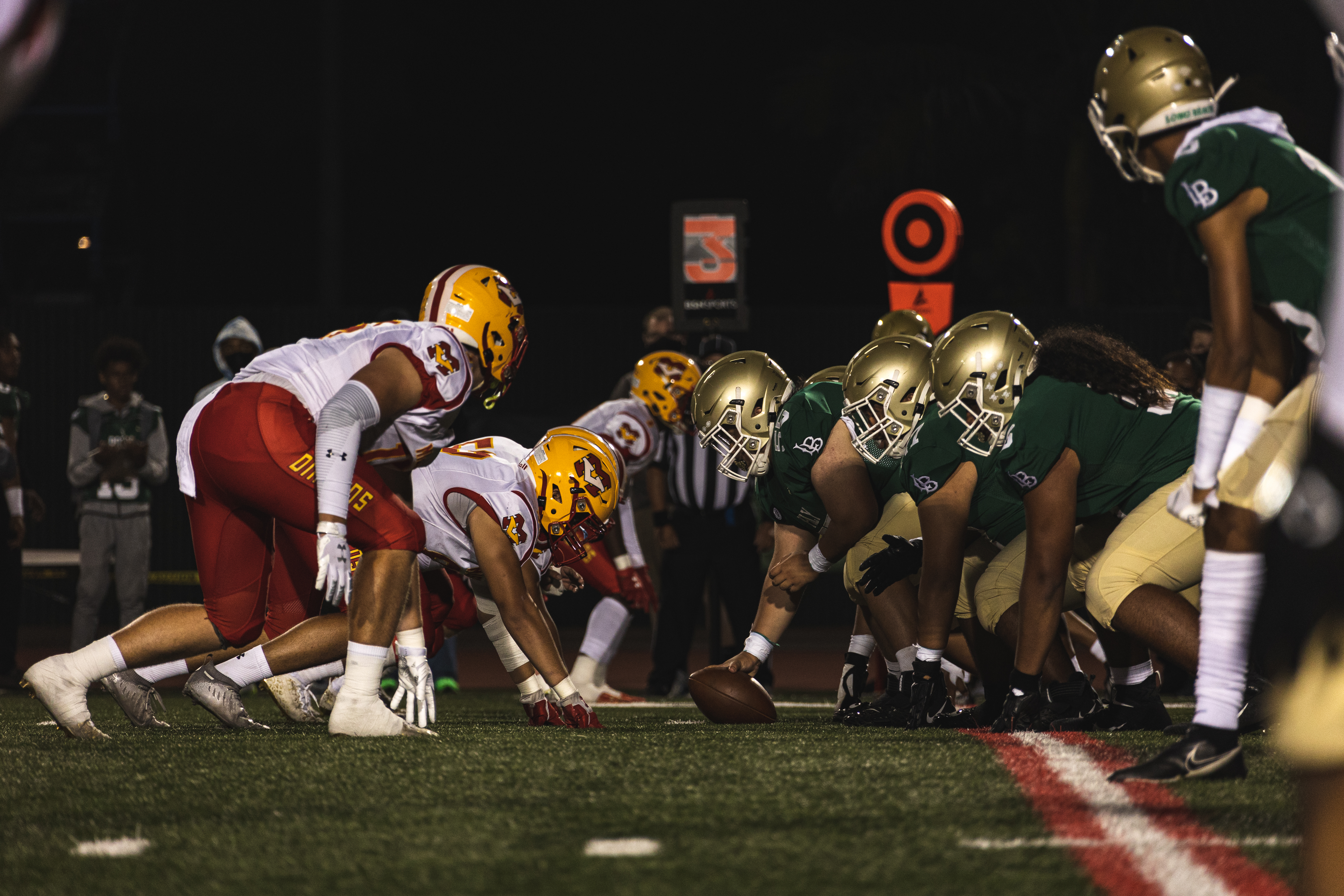
Mission Viejo vs. Long Beach Poly High School football game, 2021

Finally, in 1967, the Vet hosted a professional football team: the Long Beach Admirals were admitted to the Continental Football League as part of the league's expansion to the west coast. The Admirals drew only 2,475 fans for an exhibition game, and just 950 fans for their regular season opener, a 37-13 blowout loss to the Seattle Rangers. The team then applied for an immediate relocation to Portland, Oregon; after this was denied, the Admirals dropped out of the league and folded.

In 1987, Long Beach City College acquired Veterans Stadium from the City of Long Beach, and subsequently upgraded the stadium for use by local high school football teams.

One of the most memorable football contests held at the stadium involved Long Beach Polytechnic High School and Lakewood High School, which drew over 11,500 fans and gained regional television coverage. Veterans Stadium is currently the home stadium of the Long Beach Poly Jackrabbits.

=== Speedway ===
During the 1980s the stadium also doubled as a Motorcycle speedway venue. The speedway track was laid out over the stadiums existing 400 metres (440 yd) athletics track with additional banking in the corners to allow for faster racing. As well as hosting the World Team Cup Final in 1985 and 1988 (both won by Denmark with the USA finishing second), the stadium played host to numerous American Finals which were then qualifying rounds for the Speedway World Championship during the decade.

Some of the riders to have raced at the stadium include Individual World Champions Bruce Penhall and Sam Ermolenko (USA), Erik Gundersen and Hans Nielsen (Denmark), Per Jonsson (Sweden) and Gary Havelock (England), as well as a host of top class riders such as Americans Shawn and Kelly Moran, Bobby Schwartz and Scott Autrey. Veterans is also the site where Dennis Sigalos ended his career with a badly broken leg following a crash in the 1984 American Final.

=== Rugby League ===
Probably the most historically notable football contest at this stadium involved a completely different code, rugby league. In 1987, after the three regular matches in the Australian State of Origin series between the states of Queensland and New South Wales, the two teams went to Long Beach for a fourth match, drawing an announced crowd of 12,439 to see New South Wales win 30–18.

The canonicity of the match has been in dispute ever since. While all Australian authorities count the match for purposes of individual player statistics, not all of them include it in official team records. Sources in New South Wales, including the Australian Rugby League and its successor, the Australian Rugby League Commission, officially count the match result; those within the Queensland Rugby League do not.

In 2004, Veterans Stadium received another upgrade. A new SprinTurf playing surface replaced the old playing surface in time for the 2004 football season.

=== Soccer ===
Veterans Memorial Stadium hosted a match in the 1958 FIFA World Cup qualification; Mexico routed the United States, 7-2, in front of 12,500.

== About Veterans Stadium ==
=== The basics ===
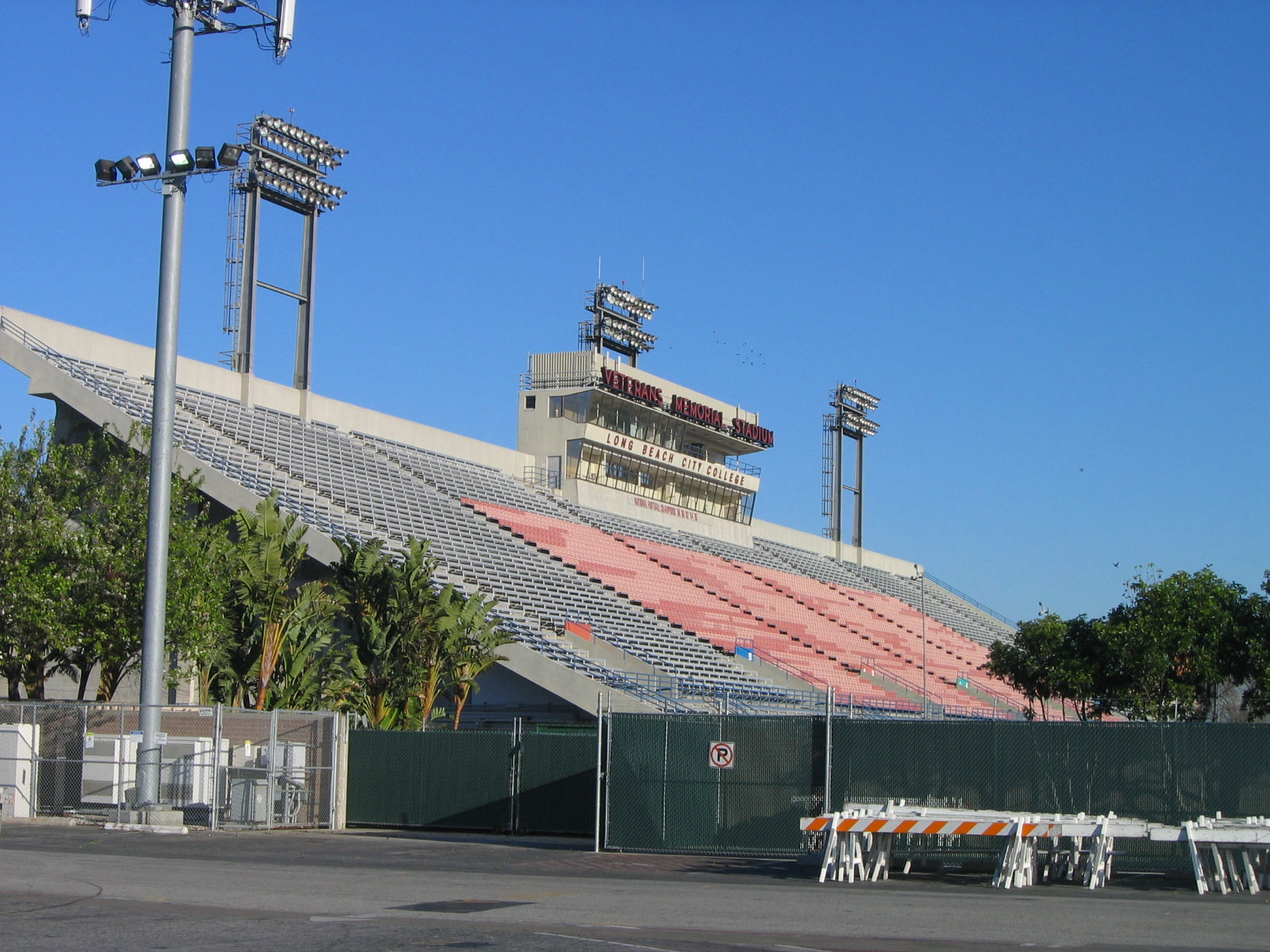
Exterior view of a stadium's stand in 2007

Veterans Stadium seats 11,600, and are on one side of the stadium, a grandstand facing east. 7,000 of the seats are aluminum bench bleachers, with the other 4,600 seats having fixed chairbacks. The field is surrounded by a nine-lane, 400-meter track.

=== Location ===
The stadium is located on Lew Davis Street between Clark Avenue and Faculty Avenue. It is three miles west of Interstate 605 (use the Carson Street exit) and two miles north of Interstate 405 (use the Lakewood Boulevard exit or the Bellflower Boulevard exit).

=== Technical information ===
The field is open at both ends and there is a practice field on the north side and a large parking lot on the south side. There are large locker rooms for both home and visiting teams in the stadium and a smaller room for game officials. There are lights for night play using metal-halide lamps on eight towers. Veterans Stadium also features a two-level press box (capacity 100) atop the west grandstand.

Spectator amenities include 4,000 surface parking spaces, two ticket booths with two windows each, three permanent concessions, and a combined message board and scoreboard.
