= Bob Humphreys (athlete) =

American shot putter and discus thrower

Personal information
- Full name: Robert Keith Humphreys
- Born: March 30, 1936 Los Angeles, California, U.S.
- Died: September 16, 2022 (aged 86) Camarillo, California, U.S.
- Football career

No. 75, 2, 86
- Position: Placekicker

Personal information
- Listed height: 6 ft 1 in (1.85 m)
- Listed weight: 240 lb (109 kg)

Career information
- High school: Jordan (Long Beach, California)

Career history
- Long Beach Admirals (1967); Denver Broncos (1967–1968); Las Vegas Cowboys (1969); Southern California Sun (1974)*
- * Offseason or practice squad member only
- Stats at Pro Football Reference
Medal record
Men's Athletics
Representing the United States
Pan American Games
Gold medal – first place	1963 São Paulo	Discus

Robert Keith Humphreys (March 30, 1936 – September 16, 2022) was an American track and field athlete and professional football player.

== Early life ==
Robert Keith Humphreys was born on March 30, 1936, in Los Angeles. He attended Jordan High School in Long Beach, California.

== Track career ==
He competed in the men's discus throw and the shot put event during his career. His career highlight was a gold medal in the discus at the 1963 Pan American Games, setting a Pan Am Record at time.

1962, Humphreys competed for the Pasadena Olympians track club. 1963 Humphreys represented the USA vs Germany and Poland in international competition.

He later went on to compete in masters athletics and took a bronze medal in the 1987 World Championship weight pentathlon. Humphreys currently holds a M60 and a M70 SCA Masters Meet Record from a 1996 and 2006 meet. Humphreys currently holds a M40 Masters West Region Meet Region from a 1977 meet. Humphreys is in the Long Beach City College Hall of Fame. Humphreys formerly held the Masters M40 US Record for the 2.0 kg Discus throw (1976)

=== Personal bests ===
- Shot Put — 17.88 metres (Los Angeles, May 20, 1960)
- Discus Throw — 62.00 metres (Long Beach, July 14, 1962)

== Football career ==
Humphreys began his football career as a placekicker with the Long Beach Admirals of the Continental Football League (COFL) in 1967, converting five of seven field goals in three games before the team folded. He then spent some time playing for a semi-professional team.

While he was on vacation, he went to try out for the Denver Broncos of the American Football League. Humphreys signed with the Broncos on October 12, 1967. He played in eight games for the Broncos during the 1967 season, converting seven of 15 field goals and 18 of 19 extra points. He appeared in two games for the Broncos in 1968, making one of five field goals and one of one extra points, before being released.

Humphreys played for the Las Vegas Cowboys of the COFL in 1969, converting 11 of 25 field goals and 30 of 31 extra points.

Humphreys signed with the Southern California Sun of the upstart World Football League (WFL) in 1974. He was released on June 18, 1974, before the start of the 1974 WFL season.
