= Wes Schweitzer =

Former American football player (born 1993)

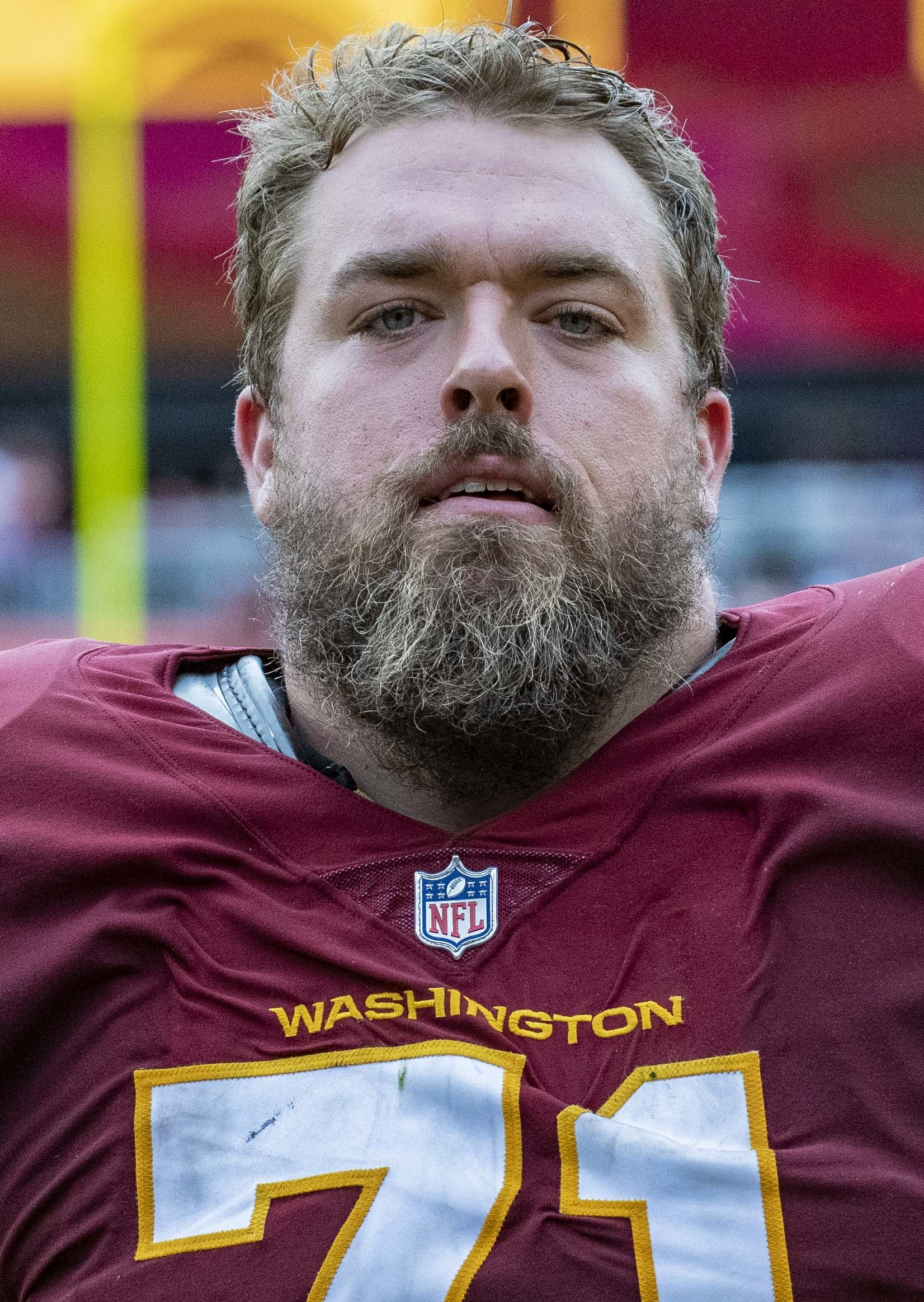
- Schweitzer with the Washington Football Team in 2021

No. 71
- Position: Guard

Personal information
- Born: September 11, 1993 (age 33); Scottsdale, Arizona, U.S.
- Listed height: 6 ft 4 in (1.93 m)
- Listed weight: 300 lb (136 kg)

Career information
- High school: Chaparral (Scottsdale)
- College: San Jose State (2011–2015)
- NFL draft: 2016: 6th round, 195th overall pick

Career history
- Atlanta Falcons (2016–2019); Washington Football Team / Commanders (2020–2022); New York Jets (2023–2024); New England Patriots (2025)*
- * Offseason or practice squad member only

Awards and highlights
- Second-team All-MW (2015)

Career NFL statistics
- Games played: 90
- Games started: 62
- Stats at Pro Football Reference

Weston Robert Schweitzer (born September 11, 1993) is an American former professional football player who was an offensive guard for nine seasons in the National Football League (NFL). He played college football for the San Jose State Spartans and was selected by the Atlanta Falcons in the sixth round of the 2016 NFL draft. Schweitzer was also a member of the Washington Football Team / Commanders, New York Jets, and New England Patriots.

== Early life ==
Schweitzer was born on September 11, 1993, in Scottsdale, Arizona, where he graduated from Chaparral High School in 2011. Schweitzer also was a wrestler in high school in addition to playing football, where he joined the starting line up as a sophomore and helped win more than three consecutive state championships. Schweitzer originally planned on joining the U.S. Marines after high school until he began receiving athletic scholarship offers.

== College career ==
As a two-star recruit, Schweitzer committed to San Jose State in 2011 over offers from Air Force, Columbia, Hawaii, Idaho, New Mexico, and Utah State. He redshirted his true freshman season in 2011 and played in seven games in 2012. In 2013, under new head coach Ron Caragher, Schweitzer started all 12 games at left tackle and helped the offense set a school record average 493.2 yards per game. The offensive line also gave up one sack per 23.6 pass attempts, and the yards per rush improved by 0.5 from the previous season. Schweitzer started all 25 games in the 2014 and 2015 seasons, including San Jose State's victory in the 2015 Cure Bowl. As a senior in 2015, Schweitzer was elected team captain and earned second-team All-Mountain West Conference honors.

A chemistry major, Schweitzer graduated in 2016. In 2013 and 2014, Schweitzer was an atmospheric chemistry research intern at the San Jose State University College of Science. Schweitzer won four academic all-conference honors and was named to the 2016 National Football Foundation Hampshire Honor Society.

== Professional career ==
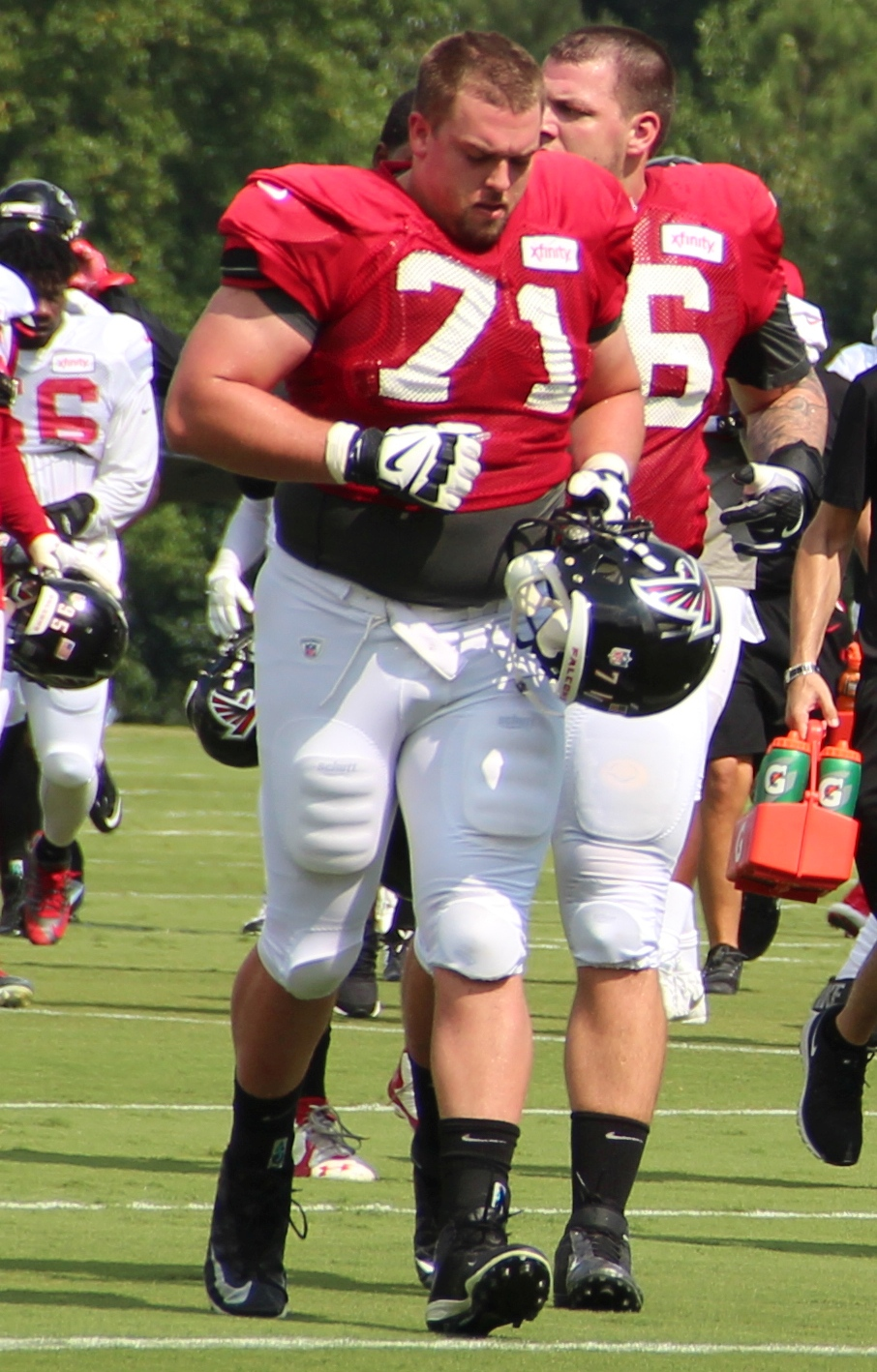
Schweitzer (#71) during practice with the Atlanta Falcons, 2016

=== Atlanta Falcons ===
Pre-draft measurables
Height	Weight	Arm length	Hand span	40-yard dash	10-yard split	20-yard split	20-yard shuttle	Three-cone drill	Vertical jump	Broad jump	Bench press
6 ft 4 in (1.93 m)	300 lb (136 kg)	32 5/8 in (0.83 m)	10 1/2 in (0.27 m)	5.15 s	1.75 s	2.97 s	4.73 s	7.80 s	27.5 in (0.70 m)	9 ft 0 in (2.74 m)	28 reps
All values from Pro Day

Schweitzer was selected by the Atlanta Falcons in the sixth round (195th overall) in the 2016 NFL draft. Schweitzer signed a four-year contract with the Falcons on May 5. Schweitzer was named the Falcons' starting right guard to start the 2017 season, and ended up starting all 16 games. In 2018, Schweitzer was demoted to swing guard and backup center to start the season after losing the starting right guard spot to Brandon Fusco. He was named the starting left guard in Week 3 following a season-ending injury to Andy Levitre, and started 13 games there.

=== Washington Football Team / Commanders ===
On March 24, 2020, Schweitzer signed with the Washington Football Team, then known as the Redskins prior to a name change later that offseason. From Week 3 through 5, Schweitzer filled in as the starting right guard after Brandon Scherff suffered an injury in the Week 2 game against the Arizona Cardinals. Starting Week 7 against the Dallas Cowboys, Schweitzer was made the starting left guard due to the poor performance of Wes Martin and Saahdiq Charles being placed on injured reserve. He played all 16 games of the regular season, starting 13 (three at right guard and ten at left guard).

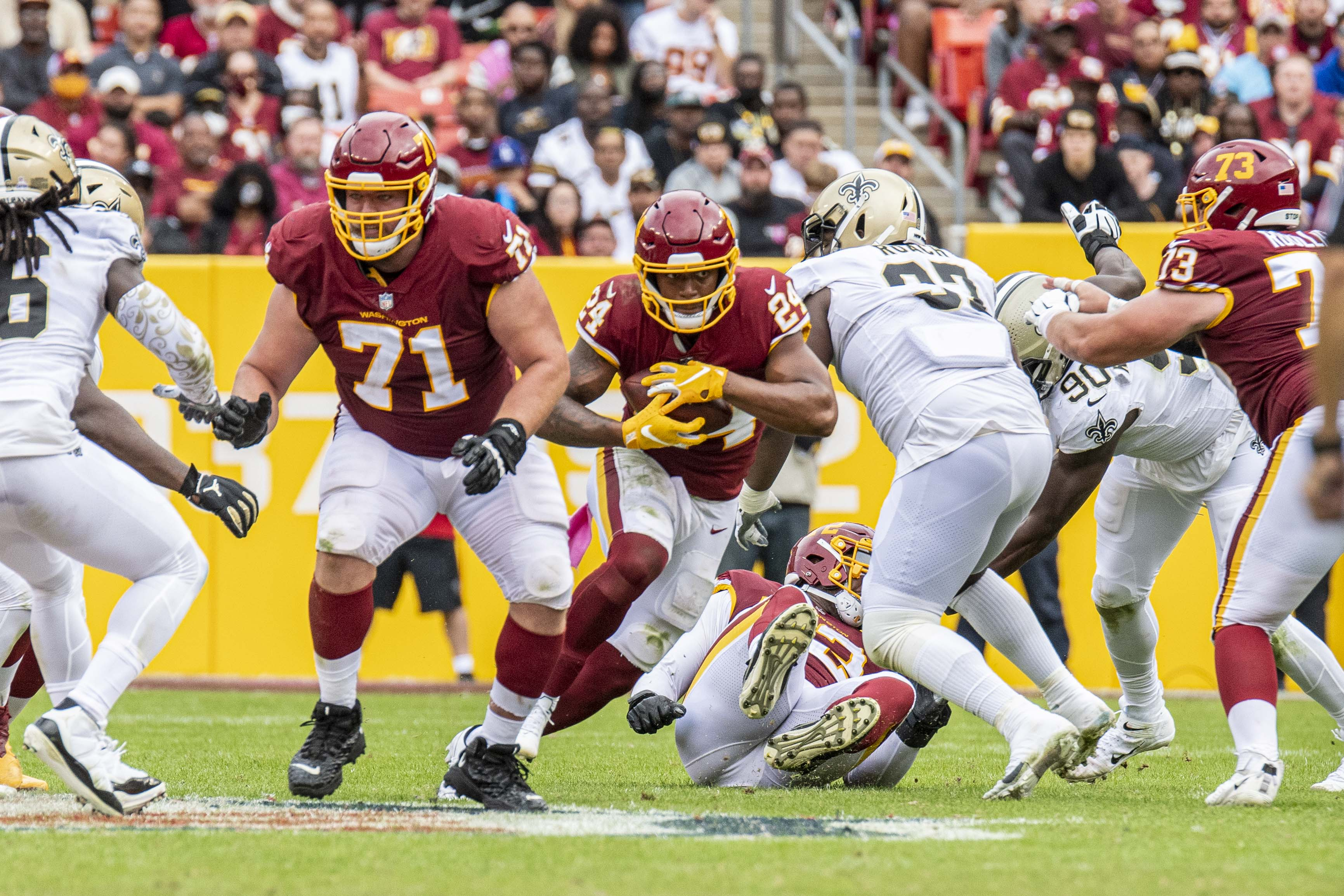
Schweitzer (#71) playing against the New Orleans Saints in 2021.

Schweitzer filled in for an injured Scherff as the starting right guard from Week 5 through 8 of the 2021 season. In the Week 11 win over the Carolina Panthers, he took over at center after Tyler Larsen left the game due to injury. The following week, Schweitzer started at center against the Seattle Seahawks but left the game after suffering an ankle injury and was subsequently placed on injured reserve. Schweitzer was placed on injured reserve on October 1, 2022. He was activated on December 3.

=== New York Jets ===
On March 16, 2023, Schweitzer signed a two-year contract with the New York Jets. He was placed on injured reserve on October 31, 2023. He was activated on December 2, but placed back on injured reserve a week later.

Schweitzer suffered a hand injury in practice before Week 1 and was placed on injured reserve on September 7, 2024. He was activated on December 7.

=== New England Patriots ===
On March 17, 2025, Schweitzer signed a one-year contract with the New England Patriots. He officially retired from football on June 10.

== Personal life ==
Schweitzer is a fan of rock climbing. He originally picked up the hobby as a way to condition his arms during his time with the Falcons.
