= Don Deeks =

American football player (1923–1995)

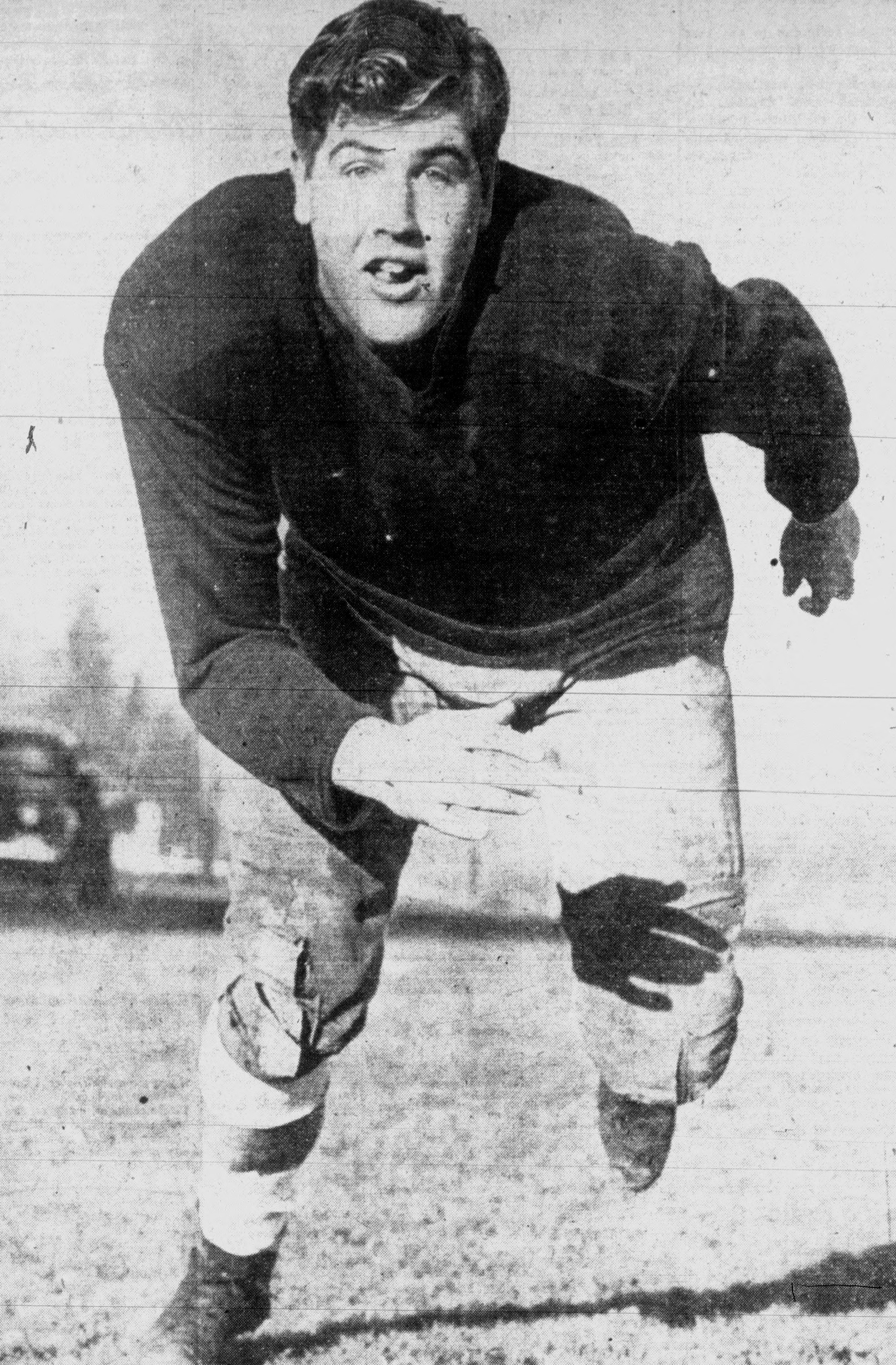
- Deeks, circa 1942

No. 45, 41, 21, 85
- Positions: Tackle, guard

Personal information
- Born: February 10, 1923; Portland, Oregon, U.S.
- Died: September 4, 1995 (aged 72); Bend, Oregon, U.S.
- Listed height: 6 ft 4 in (1.93 m)
- Listed weight: 238 lb (108 kg)

Career information
- High school: Grant (Portland)
- College: Washington (1941-1943)
- NFL draft: 1945: 4th round, 31st overall pick

Career history
- Portland Rockets (1944); Boston Yanks (1945–1947); Washington Redskins (1947); Green Bay Packers (1948)

Career NFL statistics
- Games played: 29
- Games started: 9
- Stats at Pro Football Reference

Donald Philip Deeks (February 10, 1923 – September 4, 1995) was an American professional football offensive lineman in the National Football League for the Boston Yanks, the Washington Redskins, and the Green Bay Packers.

Deeks was born in Portland, Oregon. He played college football at the University of Washington and threw javelin as a track and field athlete. He was drafted in the fourth round of the 1945 NFL draft, and played for the Boston Yanks from 1945 to 1947, when he joined the Washington Redskins. In 1948, the Washington Redskins traded Deeks to the Green Bay Packers.

Deeks married Eleanor McMenamin in 1948. He died in 1995, at the age of 72, in Bend, Oregon. His grandsons played football at the high school level.
