= Elmer Kolberg =

American football player (1916–1994)

No. 22, 16, 8, 42, 35
- Positions: Halfback, End, Center

Personal information
- Born: January 21, 1916; Orange, California, U.S.
- Died: September 30, 1994 (aged 78); Portland, Oregon, U.S.
- Listed height: 6 ft 4 in (1.93 m)
- Listed weight: 201 lb (91 kg)

Career information
- High school: Lincoln (Portland)
- College: Oregon State (1934-1937)
- NFL draft: 1938: 9th round, 72nd overall pick

Career history
- Wilmington Clippers (1939); Philadelphia Eagles (1939–1940); Pittsburgh Steelers (1941); Portland Boilermakers (1942)

Career NFL statistics
- Receptions: 10
- Receiving yards: 78
- Punts: 10
- Punt yards: 401
- Interceptions: 1
- Stats at Pro Football Reference

Elmer Frank Kolberg (January 21, 1916 – September 30, 1994) was an American professional football halfback, center, fullback and end in the National Football League (NFL). He was selected by the Philadelphia Eagles in the ninth round of the 1938 NFL draft. He played for the Eagles and the Pittsburgh Steelers.

Kolberg was born in Orange, California. n high school, he was three-time all-league selection in both football and basketball.

He played both college football and basketball at Oregon State. He was an aggressive player who set a conference record for most individual personal fouls in a single basketball season. He was named basketball All-Coast at guard for the Beavers. In football, he was named to the west team for the East–West Shrine Game in 1938.

Kolberg served in the Navy during World War II. After the war he worked as a real estate appraiser.

Kolberg was married in the summer of 1941. He is a member of the Portland Interscholastic League (high school) Hall of Fame.
