= Los Angeles Wildcats =

Los Angeles Wildcats is a name shared by several American football teams from Los Angeles:

- Los Angeles Wildcats (AFL), a team that played in the American Football League of 1926
- Los Angeles Wildcats (Minor League AFL), a team that played in the American Football League of 1944
- Los Angeles Wildcats (XFL), an XFL team that began play in 2020
