= Wes Martin =

American football player (born 1996)

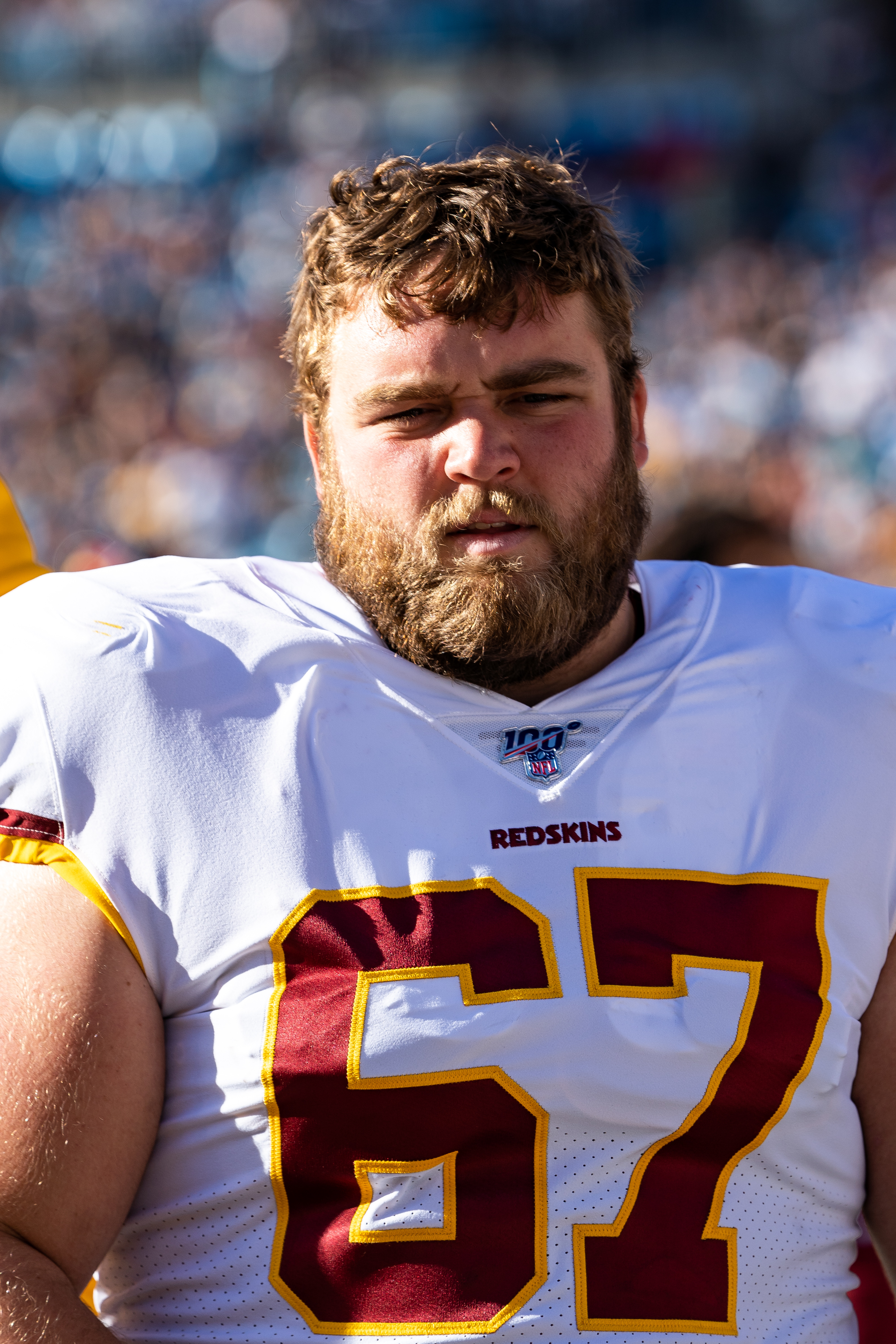
- Martin with the Washington Redskins in 2019

No. 67, 63
- Position: Offensive guard

Personal information
- Born: May 9, 1996 (age 30); West Milton, Ohio, U.S.
- Listed height: 6 ft 3 in (1.91 m)
- Listed weight: 315 lb (143 kg)

Career information
- High school: Milton-Union (West Milton)
- College: Indiana (2014–2018)
- NFL draft: 2019: 4th round, 131st overall pick

Career history
- Washington Redskins / Football Team (2019–2021); New York Giants (2021); Jacksonville Jaguars (2022)*; Washington Commanders (2022); Cleveland Browns (2023)*
- * Offseason or practice squad member only

Career NFL statistics
- Games played: 38
- Games started: 11
- Stats at Pro Football Reference

Wesley Martin (born May 9, 1996) is an American former professional football player who was an offensive guard in the National Football League (NFL). He played college football for the Indiana Hoosiers and was selected by the Washington Redskins in the fourth round of the 2019 NFL draft. Martin was also a member of the New York Giants, Jacksonville Jaguars and Cleveland Browns.

== Early life ==
Martin grew up in West Milton, Ohio, and attended Milton-Union High School. He was named the Southwestern Buckeye League Offensive Lineman of the Year as a junior and first team All-Ohio as a senior. A 3-star recruit, Martin committed to Indiana over offers from Ball State, Bowling Green, Kent State, Miami (OH), and Ohio.

== College career ==
Martin spent five years with the Indiana Hoosiers, redshirting his true freshman season. He played in 50 total games for the Hoosiers, 43 of which were starts, and was named honorable mention All-Big Ten Conference in his redshirt junior and senior seasons.

== Professional career ==
Pre-draft measurables
Height	Weight	Arm length	Hand span	40-yard dash	10-yard split	20-yard split	20-yard shuttle	Three-cone drill	Vertical jump	Broad jump	Bench press
6 ft 2 5/8 in (1.90 m)	311 lb (141 kg)	32 3/4 in (0.83 m)	9 3/8 in (0.24 m)	5.41 s	1.83 s	2.98 s	4.82 s	7.56 s	28.5 in (0.72 m)	9 ft 5 in (2.87 m)	38 reps
All values from Pro Day

=== Washington Redskins / Football Team ===
Martin was selected by the Washington Redskins in the fourth round (131st overall) of the 2019 NFL draft. Martin made his NFL debut on September 29, 2019, starting at right guard in place of starter Brandon Scherff in a 24–3 loss to the New York Giants. Martin started the final three games on the season after Scherff was placed on season-ending injured reserve and finished his rookie season with nine games played and five starts.

At the start of the 2020 season, Martin was named the starting left guard replacing Ereck Flowers, who left the team via free agency. He started the first five games of the season before Saahdiq Charles was named the starting left guard over him going into Washington's week six game against the Giants and Wes Schweitzer was chosen to replace Charles when he suffered a knee injury. He was released on August 31, 2021, but re-signed to the practice squad the following day.

=== New York Giants ===
Martin signed with the New York Giants on September 27, 2021. On December 6, 2021, Martin was placed on reserve/COVID-19 list and was reactivated on December 16, 2021. He was waived on May 10, 2022.

=== Jacksonville Jaguars ===
On May 11, 2022, Martin was claimed by the Jacksonville Jaguars. He was waived on August 23, 2022.

=== Washington Commanders ===
Martin was claimed off waivers by the Washington Commanders on August 24, 2022. He was released on August 30 before re-signing to their practice squad on September 5, 2022. Martin was promoted to the active roster on December 22, 2022.

=== Cleveland Browns ===
On March 30, 2023, Martin signed with the Cleveland Browns. On August 28, 2023, Martin was released from the Browns.
