= Long Beach Admirals =

American football team

- Founded: 1967
- Folded: 1967
- League: Continental Football League
- Based in: Long Beach, California
- Arena: Veterans Memorial Stadium
- Championships: 0

The Long Beach Admirals were a professional American football team based in Long Beach, California.

== History ==
Coached by Shelby Calhoun, the Admirals were a member of the Continental Football League to begin the 1967 season and were part of the league's expansion to the west coast. Calhoun, a longtime college coach and a one-time assistant at USC, was hired by club president Bill Winterble. Season tickets for the projected seven home games were sold for $15 for general admission up to $28 for the best seats.

The season did not begin promisingly for the Admirals. After losing their first exhibition game, 24–3, to defending Western Division champion Orange County Ramblers in Santa Ana, Long Beach hosted Sacramento Capitols (in the very first pro game ever held at Vets Stadium) for their second preseason contest. But only 2,814 fans watched the Admirals lose, 6–0. This did not please general manager Bob Spitler, who stated the Ads had to draw at least 6,000 fans for their regular-season opener August 26 against the Seattle Rangers, or the club would "move the next day" to Portland, Oregon. The Admirals fell well short of that number, attracting only 950 customers to the Vet as Seattle won, 37–13; Spitler made good on his threat by applying for an immediate transfer to the Oregon city. But after an all-night meeting, the league denied the request and revoked the Admirals franchise instead, opting to field only six teams in the Pacific Division.

Undaunted, the club moved to Portland anyway and announced plans to play an independent schedule, even holding tryouts. Their planned first home game in Oregon was set for October 7 against the same Seattle team that routed them in Long Beach in August; however, the CoFL then forbade its clubs to play the relocated Admirals. With many of their players staying in California and signing on with the Long Beach Falcons of the minor Western Football League, the Admirals quietly sank beneath the waves. (Portland would get a Continental League team, Portland Loggers, when the Honolulu franchise relocated just before the start of the 1969 season, but the team would draw poorly and the CoFL would soon fold.)

== Season-by-season ==
	Year	League	W	L	T	Finish	Coach
Long Beach Admirals	1967	Continental Football League	0	1	0	7th, Pacific Division	Shelby Calhoun
