= Alphonse Dotson =

American football player (born 1943)

Al Dotson
No. 79, 71, 63
- Position: Defensive tackle

Personal information
- Born: February 25, 1943 (age 83); Houston, Texas, U.S.
- Listed height: 6 ft 4 in (1.93 m)
- Listed weight: 260 lb (118 kg)

Career information
- High school: Yates (Houston)
- College: Grambling State (1961-1964)
- NFL draft: 1965: 2nd round, 24th overall pick
- AFL draft: 1965: Red Shirt 1st round, 5th overall pick

Career history
- Kansas City Chiefs (1965); Miami Dolphins (1966); Kansas City Chiefs (1967)*; Oakland Raiders (1968-1970); Winnipeg Blue Bombers (1971); Houston Texans-Shreveport Steamer (1974)
- * Offseason or practice squad member only

Awards and highlights
- First-team All-American (1964); First-team Little All-American (1964)

Career NFL/AFL statistics
- Sacks: 9.5
- Safeties: 1
- Stats at Pro Football Reference

Alphonse Alan Dotson (born February 25, 1943) is an American former professional football player who was a defensive tackle in the American Football League (AFL). He played for college football for the Grambling State Tigers, earning All-American honors in 1964.

He was selected by the National Football League (NFL)'s Green Bay Packers in the second round (24th overall) of the 1965 NFL draft. He signed with the AFL's Kansas City Chiefs and played a year. In 1966, he played for the AFL's Miami Dolphins. From 1967 to 1970 he played for the AFL's Oakland Raiders, mostly as a backup as he recorded only 4 career starts. The Raiders defensive line of that era was Ike Lassiter, Ben Davidson, Tom Keating, and Dan Birdwell, a group who set the NFL sack record (broken in 1984 by the Chicago Bears), so Dotson did not get a lot of playing time, although he played in most of the games while with the Raiders.

His son is Santana Dotson, himself a former All-American and also the 1993 NFL Defensive Rookie of the Year with the Tampa Bay Buccaneers and played in two Super Bowls with the Green Bay Packers. He was a Super Bowl champion winning Super Bowl XXXI with the Packers.

When his son, Santana, had become a free agent, Alphonse acted as his son's agent used his commission on the deal to purchase 83 acres (340,000 m^{2}) which includes grapevines that covered 1/3 of the land. So now, Dotson is now a grape grower at Certenberg Vineyards in Texas. He also is a former president of the Texas Wine and Grape Growers Association.

Dotson's grandson Alonzo Dotson, a defensive end, played college American football at the University of Oklahoma where he was part of two National Championship games and won three Big XII Conference Championships. Alonzo is now a National Scout For The Buffalo Bills after 4 seasons as an area scout for the New York Jets, he also spent 5 seasons with the Green Bay Packers as a college scout.
