= 1964 Little All-America college football team =

American college football all-star team

The 1964 Little All-America college football team is composed of college football players from small colleges and universities who were selected by the Associated Press (AP) as the best players at each position.

== Separate defensive teams ==
For 1964, the AP resumed selecting separate offensive and defensive teams. They had done so previously in 1951 and 1952, but in 1953 returned to the older tradition of selecting eleven players on a team, without regard to offensive or defensive specialization. Another change adopted in 1964 was the specialization of the selection of backs. Previously, the AP had simply selected four "backs" without regard to their roles as quarterback, halfback, or fullback. The 1964 offensive units chose players in those specific roles, and the defensive units chose included both defensive halfbacks and safeties.

== Backfield ==
Senior quarterback Charlie Green led the 1964 Wittenberg Tigers football team to their third consecutive undefeated season and the No. 1 ranking in the AP small college rankings. He passed for 5,739 yards in four years at Wittenberg. He was later inducted into the College Football Hall of Fame.

Junior halfback Randy Schultz of the State College of Iowa Panthers received first-team honors after tallying more rushing yards than all the Panthers' opponents.

Halfback Gerald Allen of Omaha received first-team honors despite having missed part of the season with a leg injury. He rushed for 213 yards against Bradley.

William Cline, a triple-threat tailback for the Tangerine Bowl champion 1964 East Carolina Pirates football team, was also named to the first team.

== Others ==
Otis Taylor helped lead the undefeated 1964 Prairie View A&M Panthers football team to the black college national championship. He was selected to the first team as an end and later spent 11 years with the Kansas City Chiefs, leading the AFL in receiving touchdowns in 1967, and the NFL in receiving yards in 1971.

Alphonse Dotson, a 268-pound offensive tackle for Grambling, also received first-team honors on one of the major All-America teams.

== First team ==
Position	Player	Team
Offense
QB	Charlie Green	Wittenberg
HB	Gerald Allen	Omaha
HB	William Cline	East Carolina
FB	Randy Schultz	State College of Iowa
E	Otis Taylor	Prairie View A&M
E	Tom Mitchell	Bucknell
T	William Fuller	Sacramento State
T	Alphonse Dotson	Grambling
G	Dan Summers	Arkansas State
G	Walter Johnson	Los Angeles State
C	Norman Musser	Linfield
Defense
DE	Milt Morin	UMass
DE	Dave Juaqut	St. Norbert
DT	John Smith	Maryland State
DT	Robert Burles	Willamette
LB	Dale Lindsey	Western Kentucky
LB	Louis Pastorini	Santa Clara
LB	Dick Giessuebel	Upsala
CB	Jerry Cole	Southwest Texas State
CB	Robert Hardy	Washburn
S	Jerry Harris	Chattanooga
S	Jimbo Pearson	Middle Tennessee

== Second team ==
Position	Player	Team
Offense
QB	Ben Monroe	Maryville (TN)
HB	Jim Allison	San Diego State
HB	Allen Smith	Findlay
FB	Dave Heide	Concordia (MN)
E	James Galmin	Tampa
E	Rich Kotite	Wagner
T	Dave Grant	Northeast Missouri State
T	Gordon Bossos	Amherst
G	Pat Stump	Northern Michigan
G	Robert Sundberg	Minot State
C	Marvin Peterson	Pacific Lutheran
Defense
DE	John Beane	West Virginia Tech
DE	Gary DeColati	Montana State
DT	Larry Hand	Appalachian State
DT	Jerry Jacobs	North Dakota
LB	Dan Davis	Sewanee
LB	Jack Hambelton	Lewis & Clark
LB	Dave Jones	Fort Hays State
CB	Jeff Kremer	Winona State
CB	Timothy Chilcutt	Austin Peay
S	Jerry Wonder	Luther
S	Randy Jackson	Texas A&I

== See also ==
- 1964 College Football All-America Team
