= Hugh Taylor (American football) =

American football player and coach (1923–1992)

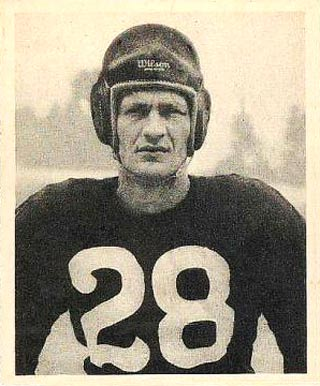
- Taylor on a 1948 Bowman football card

No. 84, 28, 26, 77
- Position: End

Personal information
- Born: July 6, 1923; Wynne, Arkansas, U.S.
- Died: November 1, 1992 (aged 69); Wynne, Arkansas, U.S.
- Listed height: 6 ft 4 in (1.93 m)
- Listed weight: 194 lb (88 kg)

Career information
- High school: Wynne
- College: Louisiana-Monroe (1942); Tulane (1943); Oklahoma City (1946)
- NFL draft: 1947: undrafted

Career history

Playing
- Washington Redskins (1947–1954); Ottawa Rough Riders (1955)

Coaching
- Florida State (1956–1957) Assistant coach; Arkansas State (1958–1959) Head coach; New York Titans (1960–1962) Wide receivers coach; San Diego Chargers (1963) Backfield coach; Houston Oilers (1964) Backfield coach; Houston Oilers (1965) Head coach; Pittsburgh Steelers (1966–1968) Wide receivers coach; Spokane Shockers (1969) Head coach

Awards and highlights
- Second-team All-Pro (1953); 2× Pro Bowl (1952, 1954); NFL receiving touchdowns co-leader (1949); 70 Greatest Redskins; As assistant coach: AFL champion (1963)

Career NFL statistics
- Receptions: 272
- Receiving yards: 5,233
- Receiving touchdowns: 58
- Stats at Pro Football Reference

Head coaching record
- Regular season: College: 7–11 (.389); NFL: 4–10 (.286)
- Coaching profile at Pro Football Reference

Hugh Wilson "Bones" Taylor (July 6, 1923 – November 1, 1992) was an American professional football player and coach. He played as an end in the National Football League (NFL) for the Washington Redskins.

== Early life ==
Taylor attended Tulane University at the start of World War II where he was a Navy V-12 student. At Tulane he was an All-Southeastern Conference and All-American basketball player in 1943. After being discharged from the U.S. Navy in 1946, he played college football at Oklahoma City College before entering the NFL in 1947.

== Pro career ==
In his first NFL game, he caught eight passes for 212 yards and three touchdowns, setting league records for an NFL debut and first game of the season. The first two records were eclipsed (with Anquan Boldin in 2003 and Frank Clarke in 1962, respectively), while Taylor still holds the touchdown record for a debut.

As a member of the Redskins from 1947 to 1954, the 6-foot-4-inch Taylor made the Pro Bowl in 1952 and 1954. His 58 receiving touchdowns in 94 career games is the most for all receivers who played less than 100 career games. He ranked in the top ten for receptions (8th), receiving yards (5th), and touchdowns (2nd) when he departed the NFL.

Following his playing career, Taylor coached in the college and professional ranks. After two seasons as an assistant at Florida State University, he served as the head football coach at Arkansas State College—now known as Arkansas State University from 1958 to 1959, compiling a record of 7–11. While at Arkansas State, he was initiated into the Sigma Pi fraternity chapter there. Taylor then moved to the American Football League (AFL), as an assistant coach with the New York Titans from 1960 to 1962 and with the San Diego Chargers in 1963.

He was an assistant for the Houston Oilers for one season before succeeding Sammy Baugh as head coach in 1965. The Oilers went 4–10 in 1965, resulting in Taylor's dismissal at the end of the season. Taylor coached receivers for the Pittsburgh Steelers of the NFL from 1966 to 1968. In 1969, he coached the Spokane Shockers of the Continental Football League. The Shockers were owned by Taylor's former Redskins teammate, Ed Justice. With the Shockers, Taylor coached Ken Stabler, a rookie quarterback late signed by the Oakland Raiders.

== Personal life ==
Taylor married Clara Jewel Hall and had two children with her. Taylor died on November 1, 1992 and was survived by his two children and two stepdaughters.

== NFL career statistics ==
Legend
	Led the league
**Bold**	Career high

=== Regular season ===
Year	Team	Games		Receiving				
Year	Team	GP	GS	Rec	Yds	Avg	Lng	TD
1947	WAS	10	0	26	511	19.7	62	6
1948	WAS	**12**	0	20	341	17.1	66	3
1949	WAS	**12**	4	45	781	17.4	**76**	9
1950	WAS	**12**	**12**	39	833	21.4	70	9
1951	WAS	**12**	**12**	29	444	15.3	47	3
1952	WAS	**12**	**12**	**41**	**961**	**23.4**	70	**12**
1953	WAS	**12**	**12**	35	703	20.1	71	8
1954	WAS	**12**	**12**	37	659	17.8	60	8
Career		94	64	272	5,233	19.2	76	58

== Head coaching record ==
=== College ===
Year	Team	Overall	Conference	Standing	Bowl/playoffs
**Arkansas State Indians** (Independent) (1958–1959)
1958	Arkansas State	4–5			
1959	Arkansas State	3–6			
Arkansas State:		7–11			
Total:		7–11			

=== NFL ===
Team	Year	Regular season					Postseason			
Team	Year	Won	Lost	Ties	Win %	Finish	Won	Lost	Win %	Result
HOU	1965	4	10	0	.286	**4th in AFL East**	-	-	-	
Total		4	10	0	.286					
