= Ted Studebaker =

Ted Studebaker (September 29,1945 outside of Dayton, Ohio – 26 April 1971) was a pacifist and conscientious objector who served as an agricultural worker during the Vietnam War and was executed in the early hours of April 26, 1971 by North Vietnamese forces.

Studebaker was the 7th child of eight born on a farm near the small town of West Milton, Ohio. He was a devout member of the Church of the Brethren, and also excelled in sports and played football, wrestled and was a track and field athlete (pole vaulter) at Milton Union high school in West Milton, OH as well as in college where he attended the small liberal arts school Manchester University in North Manchester, Indiana. He then attended Florida State University for two years completing his graduate degree in social work (MSW) before he left in early 1969 for Vietnam. Ted also had a great love for music and was a guitarist.

On August 27, 1967, Studebaker delivered a message from the pulpit to the congregation at the West Milton Church of the Brethren. He expressed concerns about social issues of the day, including the war in Southeast Asia.

"The dehumanizing process of war concerns me deeply," Studebaker said. "What can I do about man's inhumanity to man?"

In Vietnam he served with Vietnam Christian Service (VNCS), an affiliate of Church World Services (CWS), where his goal was to follow the example of Jesus Christ. He volunteered for two years working with Montagnard hill tribe people in the Central Highlands of Vietnam near Di Linh, where he helped them with agricultural production. He bought fertilizer and sold it to the tribe at cost to yield a better crop, did the same with a roto-tiller, and also worked on water ram irrigation and a poultry production project. Ted became fluent in Vietnamese as well as the Koho language of the local hill tribe people with whom he worked. He believed that working and learning with these minority people of Vietnam was an important way to pursue true peace and stability in Vietnam rather than participating in the war, although he did not side with either the Vietnamese or the US military. He married Ven Pak Lee, a Chinese coworker in April 1971 and together they extended their volunteer work for an additional third year. The couple were wed one week before he was killed.

Ted was killed in the early hours of April 26, 1971 by a small band of North Vietnamese forces when they first attacked the VNCS project house with rockets and then invaded. The soldiers likely did not know who Studebaker was, they merely saw him as an American and therefore a threat and so he was executed. The lives of his wife and other female volunteers were spared.

A record album was released of Ted Studebaker's music. The name of the album is Life is Good, Yea!/Ted Studebaker in Vietnam. According to the liner notes, "This record was produced from cassette tape recordings Ted Stedebaker sent from Vietnam to his family, relatives and friends....This project was conceived by Ted's brother, Gary, and Steve Engle." An original copy of the LP is in the Vietnam War Song Project collection.

A book, Ted Studebaker - An Enduring Force for Peace, was published in 2017 by Ted's brothers Gary and Doug Studebaker following their 2012 journey to Vietnam, connecting with many of the people with whom Ted worked. Ted is also memorialized along with many other "peace heroes" at the International Peace Museum at Courthouse Square in Dayton, OH.
