= Len Younce =

American football player and coach (1917–2000)

- Younce as a young coach in 1949

No. 32, 60
- Positions: Guard, linebacker, placekicker

Personal information
- Born: January 8, 1917; Dayton, Oregon, U.S.
- Died: March 26, 2000 (aged 83); Portland, Oregon, U.S.
- Listed height: 6 ft 1 in (1.85 m)
- Listed weight: 208 lb (94 kg)

Career information
- High school: Roosevelt (Portland)
- College: Oregon State (1937-1940)
- NFL draft: 1941: 8th round, 67th overall pick

Career history

Playing
- New York Giants (1941, 1943–1944, 1946–1948)

Coaching
- Oregon State (1949–1954) Offensive line coach; Saskatchewan Roughriders (1960) Assistant coach; Saskatchewan Roughriders (1961–1962) Line coach; Edmonton Eskimos (1963–1965) Defensive/offensive line coach; Portland Loggers (1969) Line coach

Awards and highlights
- 2× First-team All-Pro (1943, 1944); Second-team All-Pro (1946); NFL punting yards leader (1943); NFL 1940s All-Decade Team; First-team All-PCC (1940); Second-team All-PCC (1939)

Career NFL statistics
- Games played: 65
- Starts: 57
- Punts: 70
- Punting yards: 2,845
- Longest punt: 74
- Stats at Pro Football Reference

Leonard Alonzo Younce (January 8, 1917 – March 26, 2000) was an American professional football player and coach. He had a six-year career, interrupted by World War II in the National Football League (NFL) as a member of the New York Giants. Younce played college football for the Oregon State Beavers and was selected by the Giants in the eighth round of the 1941 NFL draft.

Younce is a member of the Oregon State University Athletic and Oregon Sports Halls of Fame.

== Playing career ==
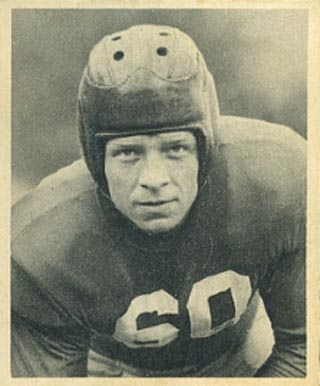
Younce on a 1948 Bowman football card.

Born in Dayton, Oregon, Younce attended Roosevelt High School in Portland and then played college football at Oregon State College in Corvallis. He was selected in the eighth round (67th overall) by the New York Giants in the 1941 NFL draft, and played a variety of positions, including linebacker, offensive lineman, placekicker, and punter. Younce was a first-team All-Pro selection in 1943 by the International News Service. In 1946, he was a first-team selection by the New York Daily News and a second-team selection by the Associated Press and United Press International.

== Coaching career ==
After retiring from playing, Younce was an assistant coach at Oregon State University from 1949 to 1954, and with the Saskatchewan Roughriders and Edmonton Eskimos. He served as the linebackers coach for the Portland Loggers of the Continental Football League in 1969.

== Later life ==
Younce was coaxed out of retirement to coach high school football for one year at Joseph High School in the small eastern Oregon town of Joseph in 1992. He intended to continue, but health problems prevented his return.

Younce was an inaugural inductee of the Oregon Sports Hall of Fame in 1980, and was inducted into the OSU Athletic Hall of Fame in 1988. He died in Portland, Oregon on March 26, 2000.
