= Mike Kellogg (American football) =

American football player (born 1942)

No. 32, 35, 66
- Position: Fullback

Personal information
- Born: October 28, 1942 (age 84); Tucson, Arizona, U.S.
- Listed height: 6 ft 0 in (1.83 m)
- Listed weight: 220 lb (100 kg)

Career information
- High school: Long Beach Polytechnic (Long Beach, California)
- College: Santa Clara (1960—1963)
- NFL draft: 1964: undrafted

Career history
- Oakland Raiders (1964)*; Indianapolis/Fort Wayne Warriors (1964–1965); Denver Broncos (1966–1967); Cincinnati Bengals (1968)*; Indianapolis Capitols (1968); Portland Loggers (1969)
- * Offseason or practice squad member only
- Stats at Pro Football Reference

Michael Karl Kellogg (born October 28, 1942) is an American former professional football fullback who played two seasons with the Denver Broncos of the American Football League (AFL). He played college football at Santa Clara University.

== Early life and college ==
Michael Karl Kellogg was born on October 28, 1942, in Tucson, Arizona. He attended Long Beach Polytechnic High School in Long Beach, California.

He was a member of the Santa Clara Broncos from 1960 to 1963.

== Professional career ==
Kellogg signed with the Oakland Raiders of the American Football League (AFL) in 1964 but was later released.

Kellogg was also a member of the Indianapolis Warriors of the United Football League in 1964. He played for the newly-renamed Fort Wayne Warriors of the Continental Football League (COFL) in 1965, rushing 54 times for 183 yards and catching 24 passes for 228 yards and three touchdowns.

He was signed by the AFL's Denver Broncos in 1966. He played in eight games for the Broncos during the 1966 season, rushing six times for three yards and catching one pass for five yards. He appeared in two games in 1967.

Kellogg was selected by the Cincinnati Bengals in the 1968 AFL expansion draft. He signed with the Bengals on May 21, 1968, but was released later that year.

He played for the Indianapolis Capitols of the COFL in 1968, recording nine carries for 26 yards and five receptions for 16 yards and one touchdown.

He was a member of the Portland Loggers of the COFL in 1969.

== Personal life ==
He is a former judge of the Los Angeles County Superior Court; he retired in 2018. His brother is retired Army Lieutenant General and current United States Special Envoy for Ukraine Keith Kellogg.
