= Spokane Shockers =

American football team (1967–1970)

- Founded: 1967
- Folded: 1970
- League: Continental Football League
- Based in: Spokane, Washington
- Arena: Joe Albi Stadium
- Championships: none

The Spokane Shockers were a professional American football team based in Spokane, Washington. The team was founded in 1967 as the Victoria Steelers of the Continental Football League but transferred to Spokane during the 1967–68 offseason. While in Spokane the team played its home games in Joe Albi Stadium. The Shockers had a farm team arrangement with the American Football League's Oakland Raiders, and their most notable player during their brief existence was future Hall of Fame quarterback Ken Stabler.

As a result of the demise of the COFL, Spokane was first forced to suspend operations and then cease them altogether. As late as June 1970, plans to continue operating the COFL's Pacific Division as a separate entity were considered viable, but these plans were abandoned when the Sacramento Capitols folded in July and the Portland Loggers stopped responding to phone calls by August.

== Season-by-season ==
	Year	League	W	L	T	Finish	Coach
Victoria Steelers	1967	COFL	4	8	0	5th, Pacific Division	Don McKeta
Spokane Shockers	1968	COFL	3	9	0	4th, Pacific Division	Don McKeta
Spokane Shockers	1969	COFL	5	7	0	4th, Pacific Division	Hugh Taylor
