= Portland Thunderbirds =

The Portland Thunderbirds, formerly the Portland Pioneers, were a semi-professional American football team based in Portland, Oregon from 1961 to 1966. They played at Multnomah Stadium (now known as Providence Park).

== History ==
An amateur football team known as the "Pioneers" played in 1961, but not in an organized league. In 1962 the North Pacific Amateur Football League was formed, which barred players with professional football experience. The Portland team renamed themselves the "Thunderbirds". The team returned in 1963 with John Moynihan as head coach. The league was renamed the North Pacific Football League and reclassified as a semi-professional circuit. That year the Thunderbirds held practices at Delta Park in North Portland. The Thunderbirds joined the newly formed Pacific Coast Semi-Pro Football League in 1964. They were sponsored by the Portland Junior Chamber of Commerce that year. Plans to join the Continental Football League failed in 1967, and the Thunderbirds subsequently disbanded.

== See also ==
- Portland Rockets
- Portland Loggers
- Portland Storm
- Portland Steel
