= American Football League (1944) =

Two 1940s minor sports leagues

- Sport: American football
- Founded: 1942
- First season: 1942
- Folded: 1944
- No. of teams: 8
- Country: United States
- Last champion: Hollywood Rangers

The Northwest War Industries League and American Football League were two closely related professional football minor leagues based on the West Coast of the United States that played for two nonconsecutive seasons during World War II.

== 1942 NWIL season ==
The Northwest War Industries League (NWIL) played one season in 1942, with the Seattle Shipbuilders, Portland Boilermakers (later Portland Rockets), and teams in Spokane, Washington and Vancouver, Washington, while plans for team in Tacoma fall through. The league commissioner was Chester "Cotton" Wilcox, and the plans were that 52% of all league profits would go to military servicemen's funds. As a result of players shortage, the league allowed the teams to play with college students.

Information regarding league demise has mostly been lost to time, but is known that only Seattle played in 1943, and that plans to append the league to the Pacific Coast Professional Football League as a semi-autonomous Northern Division fell through.

=== 1942 standings ===
Team	W	L	T	Pct.	PF	PA
Seattle Shipbuilders	6	1	0	.857	137	23
Portland Boilermakers	4	2	0	.666	187	16
Vancouver Warcos	1	3	1	.250	29	136
Spokane Manlowes	1	3	1	.250	33	93

== 1944 AFL season ==
In 1944, Portland returned to play. At the same time, the PCPFL revoked the membership of the Los Angeles Mustangs to protest owner Bill Freelove’s raiding of Jerry Corcoran’s Los Angeles Bulldogs roster. Freelove responded by reorganizing the old Northwest Industries league into a "new" league, the American Football League (with famous Hollywood lawyer Jerry Giesler as president). In 1944, an unprecedented five Los Angeles area teams were competing in one of the two rival leagues.

Both leagues had undefeated champions (the PCPFL San Diego Bombers had won their third consecutive title). AFL members San Diego Gunners, Los Angeles Wildcats (no relation to the 1926 AFL team), and Oakland Hornets folded before the end of the season. All three San Francisco Clippers losses were to the Hollywood Rangers.

On December 21, 1944, PCPFL league president J. Rufus Klawans announced a merger between the two leagues. Immediately afterward, the AFL champion Hollywood Rangers and PCPFL champion San Diego Bombers scheduled two games, one at each team’s home, to decide the “unified” Pacific Coast championship. Hollywood swept San Diego, winning 42-7 and 21-10, for the bragging rights.

However, what was trumpeted as a merger was in fact not much of a merger at all. Seattle and Portland, the two teams that had formed the basis of the original league on which the AFL had been built, declined to play in the new league. The PCPFL also demanded that the Rangers merge with the PCPFL's Hollywood Bears, something the Rangers were unwilling to do since the Bears had not played football in two years and the Rangers were the defending champions. Nonetheless, the Bears ended up restocking themselves mostly on the Rangers' players. One major point of contention between the two leagues went unaddressed: even though the leagues had agreed on a merger, they again refused entry to the Los Angeles Mustangs. In the end, of the five teams in the AFL at the end of the season, only one team ever played in the PCPFL, the San Francisco Clippers. The Rangers and Mustangs, having their league (that they organized) ripped out from under them, continued play as independents for 1945 and quietly folded.

=== 1944 standings ===
Team	W	L	T	Pct.	PF	PA
Hollywood Rangers	11	0	0	1.000	376	83
San Francisco Clippers	7	3	0	.700	193	120
Seattle Bombers	5	5	1	.500	200	157
Portland Rockets	3	6	0	.333	165	205
Los Angeles Wildcats	2	4	2	.333	133	171
San Diego Gunners	2	4	1	.333	42	161
Los Angeles Mustangs	3	7	0	.300	105	201
Oakland Hornets	0	4	0	.000	14	128
