= List of Humboldt State Lumberjacks head football coaches =

The Humboldt State Lumberjacks college football team represent California State Polytechnic University, Humboldt, formerly Humboldt State University. The Lumberjacks competed as an independent until joining the Far Western Conference (FWC) in 1946. The conference was renamed to the Northern California Athletic Conference (NCAC) in 1983, and they remained in the NCAC until the conference folded after the 1996 season. They then competed in the NAIA's Columbia Football Association (CFA) from 1997 to 2000. They joined the NCAA Division II's Great Northwest Athletic Conference (GNAC) in 2001 and have played there ever since.

The program has had 15 head coaches in its 88 seasons of existence.

== Coaches ==
No.	Coach	Tenure	Seasons	Win	Loss	Tie	Pct.	Bowls
1	Bert Smith	1924	1	1	0	0	1.000	0
2	Cy Falkenberg	1925	1	1	3	0	.250	0
3	Fred Telonicher	1927–1934	8	8	23	2	.273	0
4	Charles F. Erb	1935–1937	3	15	6	1	.705	0
5	Herbert L. Hart	1938–1940	3	12	8	0	.600	0
6	Earl Hoos	1941	1	2	5	1	.313	0
7	Joseph Forbes	1946–1947	2	10	7	1	.583	0
8	Lou Tsoutsouvas	1948	1	6	3	0	.667	0
9	Ted Staffler	1949–1950	2	0	12	2	.071	0
10	Phil Sarboe	1951–1965	15	104	37	5	.729	1
11	Bud Van Deren	1966–1985	20	98	101	4	.493	1
12	Mike Dolby	1986–1990 (Note: 1987 record adjusted for UC Davis forfeit to Humboldt State)	5	18	33	2	.358	0
13	Fred Whitmire	1991–1999 (Note: 1992 record adjusted for two Humboldt State forfeits (to Azusa Pacific and Western Montana))	9	43	49	2	.468	0
14	Doug Adkins	2000–2007	8	33	51	0	.393	0
15	Rob Smith	2008–2017	10	63	44	0	.589	0
	Totals	1924–present	89	414	382	21	.520	2
