= Chon Gallegos =

American football player (1939–2023)

No. 12, 10
- Position: Quarterback

Personal information
- Born: September 28, 1939; Gallup, New Mexico, U.S.
- Died: January 17, 2023 (aged 83); San Jose, California, U.S.
- Listed height: 5 ft 9 in (1.75 m)
- Listed weight: 175 lb (79 kg)

Career information
- High school: James Lick (San Jose)
- College: San Jose State
- NFL draft: 1962: undrafted

Career history
- Oakland Raiders (1962); San Jose Apaches (1967)

Awards and highlights
- NCAA passing touchdowns leader (1961); Pop Warner Trophy (1961); Second-team All-PCC (1961)
- Stats at Pro Football Reference

Chon Fernando Gallegos (September 28, 1939 – January 17, 2023) was an American football quarterback. He played college football for the San Jose State Spartans, leading the country in passing touchdowns and completion percentage in 1961. He played professionally with the Oakland Raiders of the American Football League (AFL).

== Early life and college ==
Chon Fernando Gallegos was born on September 28, 1939, in Gallup, New Mexico. He attended James Lick High School in San Jose, California.

Gallegos first played college football at San Jose City College. He then transferred to play for the San Jose State Spartans of San Jose State University from 1959 to 1961. He completed 13 of 27 passes (48.1%) for 158 yards, one touchdown, and nine interceptions in 1959, 30 of 56 passes (53.6%) for 301 yards, two touchdowns, and three interceptions in 1960, and 117 of 197 passes (59.4%) for 1,480 yards, 14 touchdowns, and 12 interceptions in 1961. Gallegos led the country in completions, completion percentage, and passing touchdowns during the 1961 season. He won the Pop Warner Trophy in 1961 and was also named second-team All-PCC.

== Professional career ==
Gallegos signed with the Oakland Raiders of the American Football League (AFL) in 1962 after going undrafted. He played in six games for the Raiders during the 1962 season, completing 18 of 35 passes (51.4%) for 298 yards, two touchdowns, and three interceptions.

Gallegos played for the San Jose Apaches of the Continental Football League in 1967, competing 54 of 96 passes (56.3%) for 698 yards, five touchdowns, and three interceptions.

== Post-playing career ==
Following his player career, he coached at James Lick High School and Santa Teresa High School. At James Lick, he served as Jim Plunkett's coach and at Santa Teresa he oversaw Rich Campbell and Craig Whelihan. He coached Santa Teresa High School from 1974 to 1992 and compiled a 113–77–3 record.

Gallegos died in San Jose, California on January 17, 2023, at the age of 83.

== See also ==
- List of NCAA major college football yearly passing leaders
