= West Milton, Ohio =

- Village
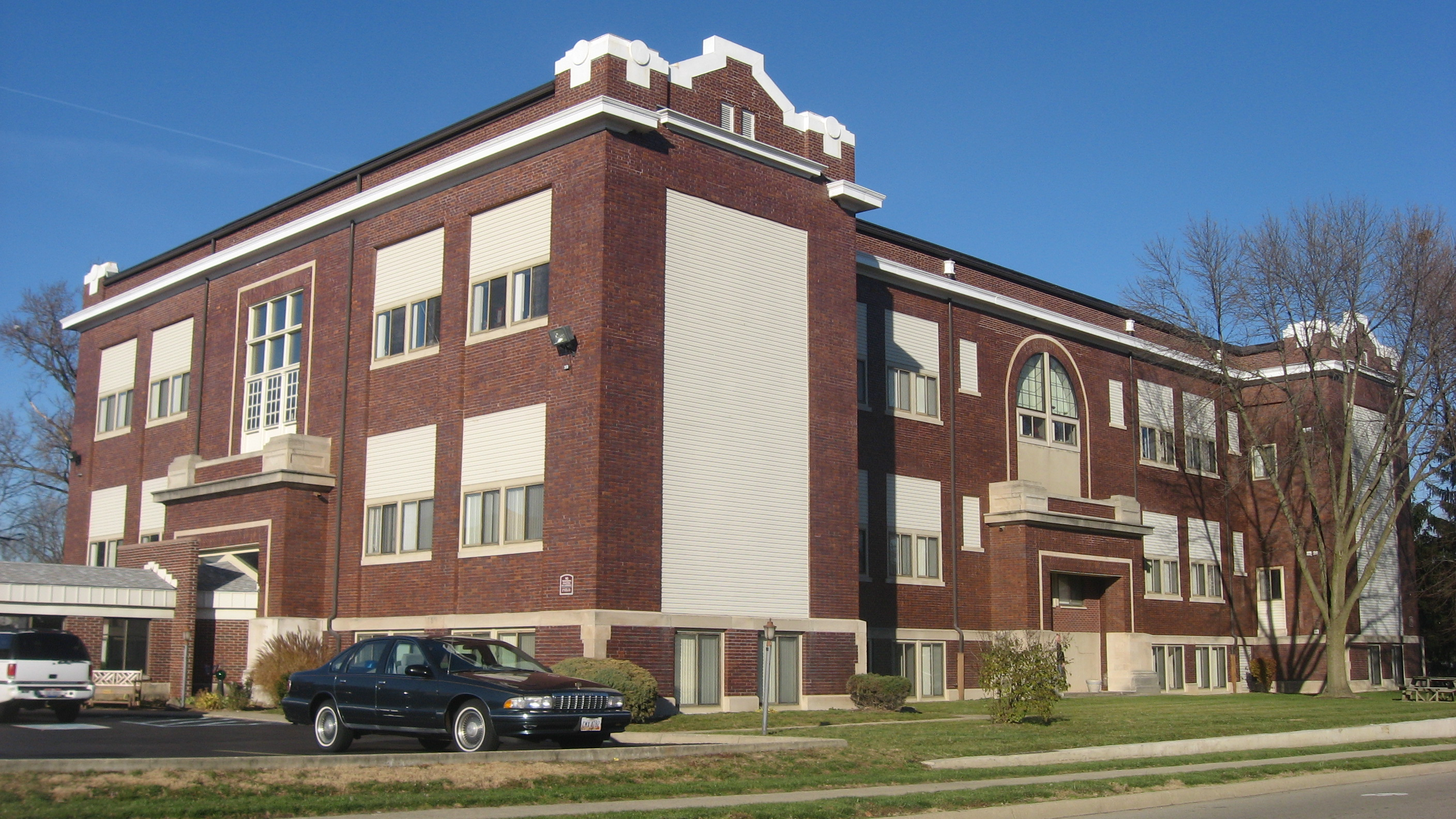
- The former McKinley School is listed on the National Register of Historic Places

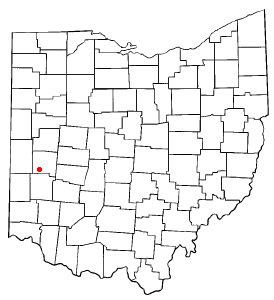
- Location of West Milton, Ohio

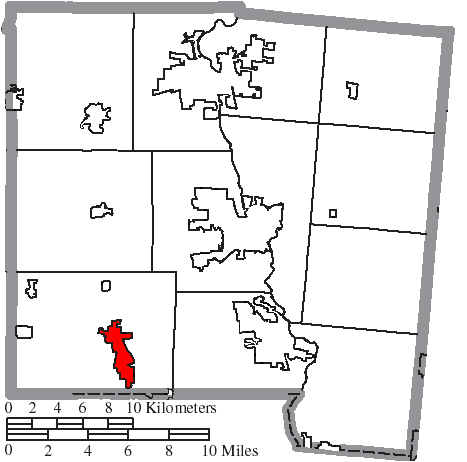
- Location of West Milton in Miami County
- Coordinates: 39°57′32″N 84°19′33″W
- Country: United States
- State: Ohio
- County: Miami
- Township: Union

Area
  - Total: 3.49 sq mi (9.04 km^{2})
  - Land: 3.39 sq mi (8.78 km^{2})
  - Water: 0.10 sq mi (0.26 km^{2})
- Elevation: 899 ft (274 m)

Population (2020)
  - Total: 4,697
  - Density: 1,385.3/sq mi (534.86/km^{2})
- Time zone: UTC-5 (Eastern (EST))
  - Summer (DST): UTC-4 (EDT)
- ZIP code: 45383
- Area codes: 937/326
- FIPS code: 39-83902
- GNIS feature ID: 2400140
- Website: www.westmiltonohio.gov

West Milton is a village in Miami County, Ohio, United States. The population was 4,697 at the 2020 census. It is part of the Dayton Metropolitan Statistical Area.

== History ==
The first settlement at West Milton was made in 1807. West Milton was named for John Milton, an English poet. A post office called Milton was established in 1824, and the name was changed to West Milton in 1829. The village was incorporated around 1834.

== Government ==
West Milton uses the council-manager government system. In this system, the mayor is the ceremonial head, elected by the public every four years. The council chooses a City Manager, who holds administrative authority over the city government. Council members are selected on a nonpartisan, at-large ballot. The mayor is Jeremy Sodders.

== Geography ==
According to the United States Census Bureau, the village has a total area of 3.34 square miles (8.65 km^{2}), of which 3.24 square miles (8.39 km^{2}) is land and 0.10 square miles (0.26 km^{2}) is water.

== Demographics ==
Historical population
Census	Pop.	Note	%±
1850	398		—
1860	390		−2.0%
1870	455		16.7%
1880	688		51.2%
1890	796		15.7%
1900	904		13.6%
1910	1,207		33.5%
1920	1,256		4.1%
1930	1,388		10.5%
1940	1,439		3.7%
1950	2,101		46.0%
1960	2,972		41.5%
1970	3,696		24.4%
1980	4,119		11.4%
1990	4,348		5.6%
2000	4,645		6.8%
2010	4,630		−0.3%
2020	4,697		1.4%
U.S. Decennial Census

=== 2020 census ===
As of the 2020 census, West Milton had a population of 4,697. The median age was 40.5 years. 23.2% of residents were under the age of 18 and 20.3% of residents were 65 years of age or older. For every 100 females there were 90.5 males, and for every 100 females age 18 and over there were 86.5 males age 18 and over.

98.4% of residents lived in urban areas, while 1.6% lived in rural areas.

There were 2,026 households in West Milton, of which 28.9% had children under the age of 18 living in them. Of all households, 43.2% were married-couple households, 17.2% were households with a male householder and no spouse or partner present, and 31.0% were households with a female householder and no spouse or partner present. About 33.1% of all households were made up of individuals and 16.6% had someone living alone who was 65 years of age or older.

There were 2,147 housing units, of which 5.6% were vacant. The homeowner vacancy rate was 1.7% and the rental vacancy rate was 5.1%.

Racial composition as of the 2020 census
Race	Number	Percent
White	4,399	93.7%
Black or African American	24	0.5%
American Indian and Alaska Native	12	0.3%
Asian	14	0.3%
Native Hawaiian and Other Pacific Islander	0	0.0%
Some other race	13	0.3%
Two or more races	235	5.0%
Hispanic or Latino (of any race)	48	1.0%

=== 2010 census ===
As of the census of 2010, there were 4,630 people, 1,973 households, and 1,298 families living in the village. The population density was 1,429.0 inhabitants per square mile (551.7/km^{2}). There were 2,102 housing units at an average density of 648.8 units per square mile (250.5 units/km^{2}). The racial makeup of the village was 97.4% White, 0.5% African American, 0.1% Native American, 0.3% Asian, 0.2% from other races, and 1.5% from two or more races. Hispanic or Latino of any race were 0.8% of the population.

There were 1,973 households, of which 32.2% had children under the age of 18 living with them, 46.2% were married couples living together, 14.4% had a female householder with no husband present, 5.1% had a male householder with no wife present, and 34.2% were non-families. 30.2% of all households were made up of individuals, and 13.1% had someone living alone who was 65 years of age or older. The average household size was 2.35 and the average family size was 2.89.

The median age in the village was 39.3 years. 25.2% of residents were under the age of 18; 7.8% were between the ages of 18 and 24; 24.6% were from 25 to 44; 25.8% were from 45 to 64; and 16.5% were 65 years of age or older. The gender makeup of the village was 47.5% male and 52.5% female.

=== 2000 census ===
As of the census of 2000, there were 4,645 people, 1,875 households, and 1,314 families living in the village. The population density was 1,923.9 inhabitants per square mile (742.8/km^{2}). There were 1,982 housing units at an average density of 820.9 units per square mile (317.0 units/km^{2}). The racial makeup of the village was 98.58% White, 0.28% African American, 0.17% Native American, 0.26% Asian, 0.17% from other races, and 0.54% from two or more races. Hispanic or Latino of any race were 0.65% of the population.

There were 1,875 households, out of which 35.7% had children under the age of 18 living with them, 52.5% were married couples living together, 13.2% had a female householder with no husband present, and 29.9% were non-families. 26.7% of all households were made up of individuals, and 12.3% had someone living alone who was 65 years of age or older. The average household size was 2.48 and the average family size was 2.97.

In the village, the population was spread out, with 28.0% under the age of 18, 8.0% from 18 to 24, 29.6% from 25 to 44, 21.3% from 45 to 64, and 13.2% who were 65 years of age or older. The median age was 36 years. For every 100 females there were 92.4 males. For every 100 females age 18 and over, there were 86.8 males.

The median income for a household in the village was $41,905, and the median income for a family was $45,847. Males had a median income of $33,774 versus $25,199 for females. The per capita income for the village was $19,402. About 4.7% of families and 6.7% of the population were below the poverty line, including 10.4% of those under age 18 and 7.4% of those age 65 or over.

== Education ==
The school district is Milton-Union Exempted Village School District.

Schools include:

- Milton-Union High School
- Milton-Union Middle School
- Milton-Union Elementary School

== Notable people ==
- Carl Brumbaugh, quarterback and halfback in the National Football League
- Howard E. Coffin, automobile engineer; co-founder of the Hudson Motor Car Company
- Charles Furnas, the first airplane passenger with the Wright Brothers
- Mike Kelly, college football coach
- Wes Martin, professional football player
- Bob Schul, the only American to have won an Olympic gold medal in the 5000 metre
- Greg Seevers, racing driver
- Ted Studebaker, pacifist and conscientious objector; served as an agricultural worker in Vietnam during the war

== WMPA-TV ==
West Milton operates WMPA-TV, an all-volunteer, non-profit public-access television cable TV station. Founded in the late 1970s, this access station has served the villages of West Milton, Laura, Ludlow Falls, Potsdam and Union Township. It has offered a variety of programming over the years including several sporting events, school functions, church services, and the broadcasting of the West Milton Council Meetings.
