= Saahdiq Charles =

American football player (born 1999)

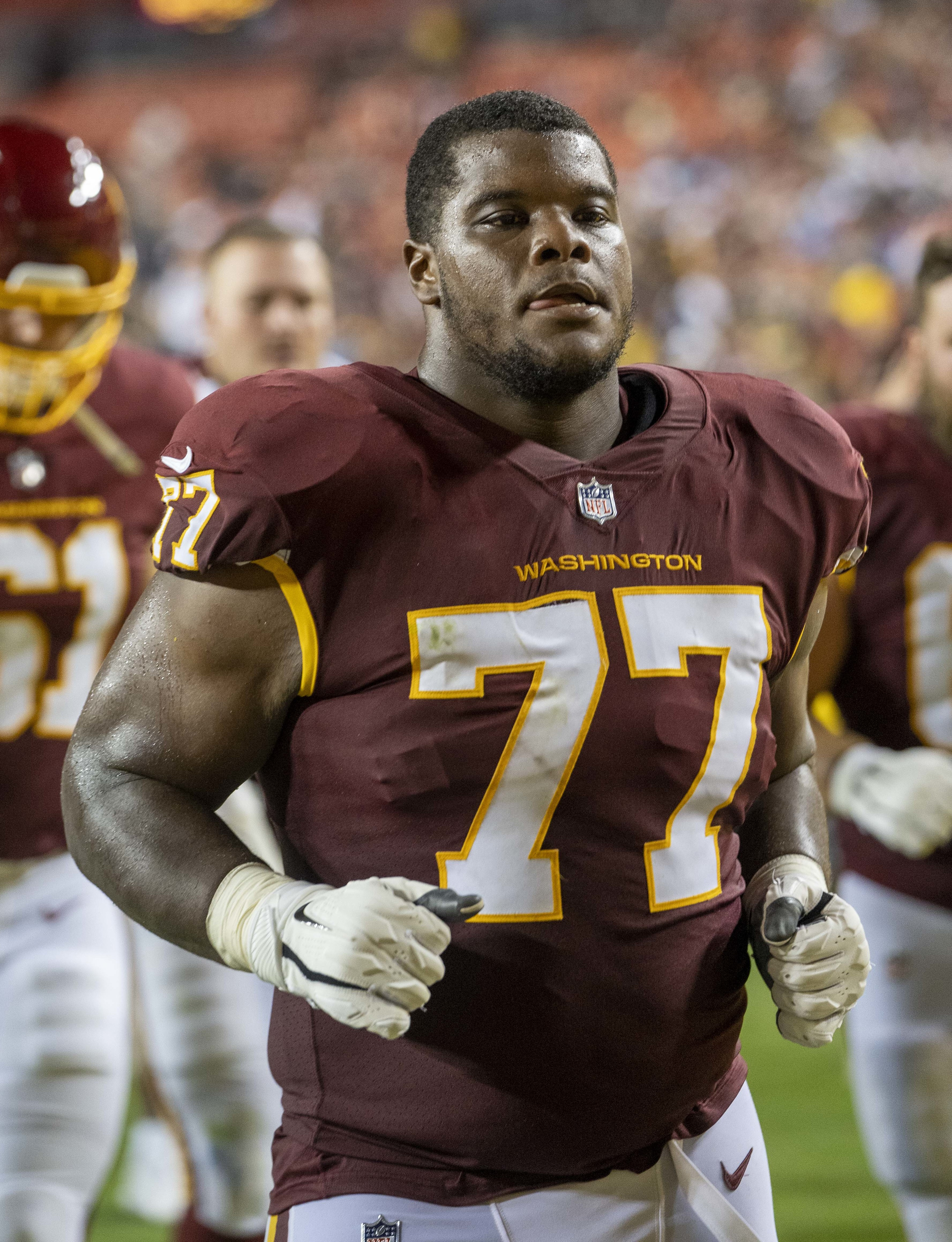
- Charles with the Washington Football Team in 2021

No. 78 – Carolina Panthers
- Position: Guard
- Roster status: Practice squad

Personal information
- Born: July 26, 1999 (age 27); Jackson, Mississippi, U.S.
- Listed height: 6 ft 4 in (1.93 m)
- Listed weight: 321 lb (146 kg)

Career information
- High school: Madison-Ridgeland Academy (Madison, Mississippi)
- College: LSU (2017–2019)
- NFL draft: 2020: 4th round, 108th overall pick

Career history
- Washington Football Team / Commanders (2020–2023); Tennessee Titans (2024)*; Dallas Cowboys (2025)*; Carolina Panthers (2025–present)
- * Offseason or practice squad member only

Awards and highlights
- CFP national champion (2019)

Career NFL statistics as of 2025
- Games played: 37
- Games started: 18
- Stats at Pro Football Reference

Saahdiq Charles (born July 26, 1999) is an American professional football guard for the Carolina Panthers of the National Football League (NFL). He played college football for the LSU Tigers and was selected by the Washington Football Team in the fourth round of the 2020 NFL draft. Charles was a member of the LSU team that won the 2020 College Football Playoff National Championship.

== Early life ==
Charles grew up in New Orleans until his family was displaced by Hurricane Katrina in 2005, living in Houston, Valdosta, Georgia, and Montgomery, Alabama, before settling in Jackson, Mississippi. Charles attended Madison-Ridgeland Academy, where he played offensive and defensive line on the football team. A 4-star recruit according to rivals.com, Charles committed to play college football at LSU over offers from Florida, Memphis, Mississippi State, Ole Miss, and Tennessee, among others.

== College career ==
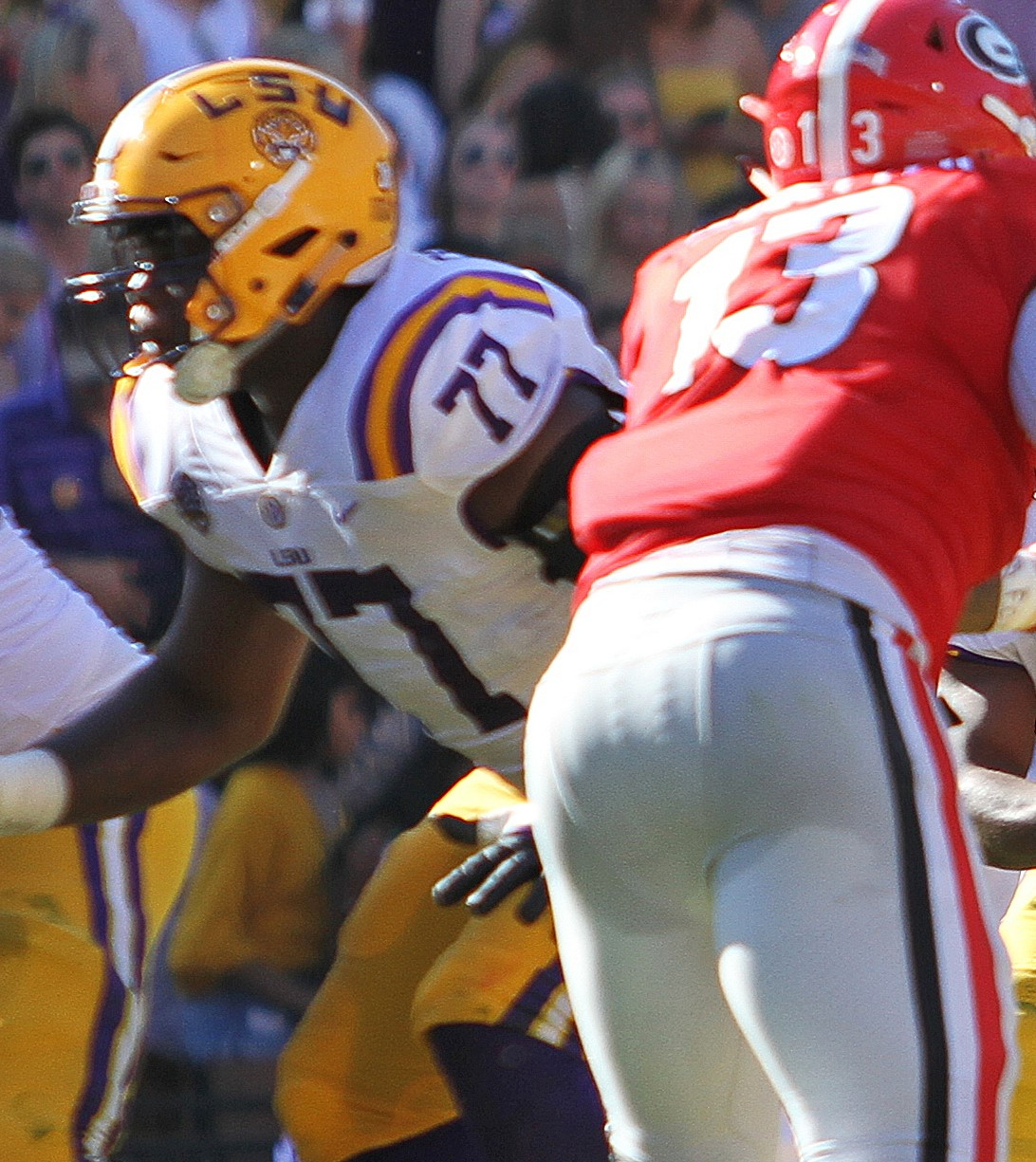
Charles (#77) at LSU, 2018

Charles played in all 13 of the Tigers' games with nine starts as a true freshman in 2017 and was named to the Southeastern Conference (SEC) All-Freshman team. He started ten games at left tackle as a sophomore.

During his junior season, Charles was suspended for the entirety of the Tigers' non-conference schedule due to a violation of team rules, but started the final nine games of the season at left tackle as the Tigers won the 2020 National Championship. Following the end of the season, Charles declared for the 2020 NFL draft, forgoing his senior season.

== Professional career ==
Pre-draft measurables
Height	Weight	Arm length	Hand span	Wingspan	40-yard dash	10-yard split	20-yard split
6 ft 4 1/8 in (1.93 m)	321 lb (146 kg)	33 in (0.84 m)	10 in (0.25 m)	6 ft 8 3/8 in (2.04 m)	5.05 s	1.73 s	3.01 s
All values from NFL Combine

=== Washington Redskins / Football Team / Commanders ===
Charles was selected by the Washington Redskins in the fourth round, 108th overall, of the 2020 NFL draft. He signed his four-year rookie contract on July 22, 2020. After missing the first five games of the season due to injury, Charles made his NFL debut in the Week 6 game against the New York Giants. Despite taking reps in training camp at offensive tackle, the team started him at left guard replacing Wes Martin, who had struggled in first five games as the starter. Charles left the game in the first quarter due to a dislocated knee cap, and was placed on injured reserve on October 24, 2020, ending his rookie season.

Charles had his second career start and his first at tackle in a Week 8 game against the Denver Broncos in 2021. He was placed on the COVID-19 reserve list on November 9, 2021, but was placed back on the active roster seven days later. In the Week 15 and Week 16 games against the Philadelphia Eagles and Dallas Cowboys, respectively, Charles started at right guard in place of Brandon Scherff who was on the team's COVID-19 reserve list. He appeared in ten games during the 2021 season.

In Week 4 of the 2022 season, Charles took over at right guard after starter Trai Turner was benched. Following the game, Charles started at right guard for three straight games before Turner returning to the starting lineup in Week 8. On January 6, 2023, he was placed on injured reserve. He played 13 games during the 2022 season.

In the 2023 offseason, Charles beat out Chris Paul and won the starting left guard position. He suffered a calf injury in Week 7 and was placed on injured reserve on October 28, 2023. He was activated on December 15. He played 11 games during the 2023 season, all as starter.

=== Tennessee Titans ===
On March 15, 2024, Charles signed a one-year $1.5 million deal with the Tennessee Titans. He was awarded the starting right guard position at the beginning of training camp, but Charles unexpectedly retired from football just a few days later for unknown reasons. The Titans placed him on the reserve/retired list on August 6. On March 12, 2025, it was announced Charles was coming out of retirement. Upon his reinstatement in the NFL, the Titans chose to release him, making him a free agent entering the 2025 offseason.

=== Dallas Cowboys ===
On April 9, 2025, Charles signed a one-year deal with the Dallas Cowboys. He was released on August 26 as part of final roster cuts and re-signed to the practice squad the next day. Charles was subsequently released by Dallas on August 30.

=== Carolina Panthers ===
On October 1, 2025, Charles signed with the Carolina Panthers' practice squad. He signed a reserve/future contract with Carolina on January 12, 2026.

On August 5, 2026, Charles was placed on injured reserve and released the next day. On September 28, he was signed to the practice squad.
