= Portland Loggers =

- Founded: 1969
- League: Continental Football League
- Based in: Portland, Oregon
- Arena: Multnomah Stadium
- Head coach: Chuck Fenenbock
- General manager: Al King
- Championships: none

The Portland Loggers were a professional American football team based in Portland, Oregon. They were members of the Continental Football League and only lasted one year. Featuring much of the roster of the defunct Orange County Ramblers, the team was originally known as the Hawaii Warriors, but were relocated from Honolulu to Portland just 18 days before the start of the 1969 season. The team played at Multnomah Stadium in the Goose Hollow neighborhood of Portland. They were coached by retired running back Chuck Fenenbock. New York Giants alum Len Younce served as Portland's linebackers coach. Al King, who was formerly the director of promotions of the Denver Broncos, served as the Loggers general manager and Paul O'Hollaren was the team's president.

During the Loggers first game, a pre-season matchup against the Las Vegas Cowboys at Cashman Field on August 10, 1969, an electrical storm caused a power outage to the stadium. After waiting 45 minutes in vain for the power to be restored, officials called the game final at a score of 34–7, in favor of the Cowboys, with 9:45 left in the contest.

To boost attendance towards the end of the season, team owners held several promotions at one game, including their November 16 game against the Spokane Shockers where it was "Ladies Night", "Boy Scout Night", "Chamber of Commerce Night" and "Picture Night". In October the team stopped holding their practices at Multnomah Stadium and started using the football field at Central Catholic High School. In late October the Loggers received placekicker Momčilo Gavrić on loan from the National Football League (NFL) San Francisco 49ers. Ultimately, only 25,157 fans attended the Loggers' six home games, or 4,192 per contest.

The Loggers were mentioned as a team that could have potentially played in a 1970 iteration of the Continental Football League, one that would have been based only in the western United States. The team was shut down in April 1970.

== Roster ==
1969 {{{team}}} roster
Quarterbacks (QB): 11 John Erdhaus; 11 Mike Fair; 11 Dick Groth; 12 Jerry Otterson; Running backs (RB): 34 Chuck Davis; 31 Arlan Elms; 20 Terry Erwin; 26 Jim Holland; 32 Bob Jackson; 30 Len Shaw; 41 Jim Warren; Wide receivers (WR): 23 Ron Barber FL; 41 Gary Inciong FL; 94 Rhome Nixon SE; 89 Tom Passanisi SE; 45 Bo Rein FL; 22 Don Summers FL; Tight ends (TE): 95 McKinley Reynolds; 84 Gene Williams	Offensive linemen (OL): 69 John Bobich; 73 Tom Fee; 65 Harry Halverstadt; 55 Steve Hodoway C; 64 Joe Scanlan; 75 Steve Van Sinderen; 77 Roger Stalick; Defensive linemen (DL): 90 Vern Butcher DE; 88 Warren Desadier; 63 Skip Diaz; –– Ray Johnson DT; 76 Dan Kubelka DT; 66 Bill Lamond DT; 62 Jerry Pope; 53 Harland Reed; –– Cal Reehl DT; 89 Jon Sandstrom	Linebackers (LB): 50 Gregg Cureton; 51 Dick Degen; –– Mickey Doyle MLB; 68 Charles Hollis; 66 Mike Kellogg LB; 57 Herb Moriyama; Defensive backs (DB) {{{defensive_back}}} Special teams (ST): 74 Bill Bailey; 90 Momčilo Gavrić K; 90 Dennis Patera K; 50 John Seedborg	Practice squad: N/A; Reserve: N/A; Rookies in italics

== Schedule ==
Week	Date	Opponent	Result	Record	Venue	Attendance
E1	August 9	at Las Vegas Cowboys	L 7–34	0–0	Cashman Field	7,000
1	August 24	Fort Worth Braves	W 17–10	1–0	Multnomah Stadium	2,316
2	August 30	at Fort Worth Braves	L 22–30	1–1	Farrington Field	10,266
3	September 7	Spokane Shockers	W 32–14	2–1	Multnomah Stadium	4,303
4	September 13	at Seattle Rangers	L 20–23	2–2	Memorial Stadium	6,065
5	September 20	at Spokane Shockers	L 17–23	2–3	Joe Albi Stadium	2,300
6	September 28	Sacramento Capitols	L 7–18	2–4	Multnomah Stadium	3,308
7	October 14	at Sacramento Capitols	L 7–27	2–5	Charles C. Hughes Stadium	5,412
8	October 21	at Las Vegas Cowboys	L 13–42	2–6	Cashman Field	4,700
9	October 26	Seattle Rangers	W 27–24	3–6	Multnomah Stadium	6,160
10	November 9	at Seattle Rangers	L 20–44	3–7	Memorial Stadium	5,471
11	November 16	Spokane Shockers	L 27–59	3–8	Multnomah Stadium	2,038
12	November 23	Las Vegas Cowboys	L 10–34	3–9	Multnomah Stadium	4,688

== See also ==
- Portland Rockets
- Portland Thunderbirds
- Portland Storm
- Portland Thunder
