= San Jose Apaches =

American football team

- Founded: 1962
- Folded: 1968
- League: Northern California Semi-Pro Football League; Pacific Football League; Continental Football League
- Based in: San Jose, California
- Arena: Spartan Stadium
- Championships: none

The San Jose Apaches were a professional American football team based in San Jose, California. The Apaches were formed as a semi-professional team in 1962 and were members of the Northern California Semi-Pro Football League and Pacific Football League (sometimes known as the Pacific Coast Football League). In 1967 the Apaches and other members of the Pacific league joined the Continental Football League as the new Pacific Division. Their head coach and general manager for the 1967 season was future Pro Football Hall of Famer Bill Walsh. Walsh led the Apaches to 2nd place in the Pacific Division.

Prior to the start of the 1968 COFL season the Apaches ceased all football operations.

== Season-by-season ==
	Year	League	W	L	T	Finish	Coach	Notes
San Jose Apaches	1965	NCL	9	1	0	t-1st, Northern California League		Beat Redwood City 7–6 in the NCL Championship game
San Jose Apaches	1966	NPFL	12	0	0	1st, Northern California League		Lost to 13–48 to Seattle Ramblers in the Pacific Coast Championship Game
San Jose Apaches	1967	COFL	8	4	0	2nd, Pacific Division	Bill Walsh	
