= Portland Rockets =

- Founded: 1944
- League: American Football League
- Based in: Portland, Oregon
- Arena: Multnomah Stadium
- President: Henry J. "Sandy" Sandberg
- Head coach: Robert L. Mathews
- Championships: none

The Portland Rockets were a professional American football team based in Portland, Oregon for two nonconsecutive seasons during World War II. They were members of the Northwest War Industries League as the Portland Boilermakers in 1942 and the American Football League (AFL) in 1944. The Rockets played their home games at Multnomah Stadium and its colors were green and orange. In 1944 team president Henry J. "Sandy" Sandberg asked people to submit suggestions for the team's nickname, the winner of which was L. J. Maclin of Salem, Oregon. Six other people made the same suggestion, but Maclin had submitted his entry first. They all received season tickets.

Robert L. Mathews, former head coach of the Portland Pilots football team, was hired to coach the Rockets during the 1944 season. Their first game was held at 2:30 on September 3 against the Seattle Bombers. In front of 10,213 attendees at Multnomah Stadium Seattle beat Portland, 21–13. The Rockets finished their first season with a 3–6 record. At the end of the 1944 season, Rockets owners were out $40,000 after plans to farm the league's talent to the National Football League (NFL) failed.

== See also ==
- Portland Thunderbirds
- Portland Loggers
- Portland Storm
- Portland Thunder
- Portland Steel
