= Seattle Rangers =

American football team

- Founded: 1967
- Folded: 1969
- League: Continental Football League
- Based in: Seattle, Washington
- Arena: Memorial Stadium
- Owner: Lafa Lane
- Championships: none

The Seattle Rangers were a professional American football team based in Seattle, Washington. The team was founded in 1967 as a member of the Continental Football League and played in the Western Division. The original franchise name of Jets was abandoned due to a lawsuit filed by the American Football League's New York Jets. The NHL's New York Rangers reportedly pressured the team to change their name from Rangers in 1969.

In May 1968, the Rangers signed a formal agreement with the Denver Broncos to act as a farm team of sorts for the AFL club. Later in the year, football legend Ernie Nevers became a stockholder and member of the team's board, with the intent of helping the team become a member of the NFL or AFL. Head coach Mel McCain was fired during the 1968–69 offseason.

Less than a year after attempting to purchase the Boston Patriots of the AFL, Rangers owner Lafa Lane announced his intention to sell a controlling interest in the Rangers. Lane resigned as chairman and president of the team at the end of October 1969, although the team did finish its season. With the end of the COFL in 1970, the Seattle Rangers also ceased operations although no official announcement was made.

== Season-by-season ==
	Year	League	W	L	T	Finish	Coach
Seattle Rangers	1967	COFL	7	6	0	3rd, Pacific Division	Mel McCain
Seattle Rangers	1968	COFL	7	5	0	2nd, Pacific Division	Mel McCain
Seattle Rangers	1969	COFL	7	5	0	3rd, Pacific Division	Don White
