= Joliet Chargers =

General information
- Founded: 1964
- Folded: 1967
- Stadium: Joliet Memorial Stadium (1965–1967)
- Headquartered: Joliet, Illinois (1965–1967)

League / conference affiliations
- United Football League (1964); Professional Football League of America (1965–1967); Eastern (1964, 1967)

Championships
- League championships: 0 (2) 1965, 1967
- Division championships: 0 (1) 1967

The Joliet Chargers was the final nickname of the professional American football franchise based in Joliet, Illinois from 1964 to 1967. The Joliet Explorers played the 1964 season as members of the United Football League. In 1965, Joliet became charter members of the Professional Football League of America (PFLA) and played the next three seasons in the league. The 1967 Joliet Chargers were an affiliate of the San Diego Chargers.

== History ==
In the 1964 season, the Joliet Explorers played the final season of the eight–team United Football League and had a winless season. Joliet finished the 1964 season with a record of 0–14. The head coaches were Joe Petruzzi (0–4), Rocco Tarsitano (0–6) and Jack Morton (0–3). The Explorers placed fourth in the Eastern Division, won by Indianapolis Warriors with a 10–4 record.

The PFLA began play in 1965, with the Joliet Explorers becoming a charter franchise in the six–team league. The Des Moines Warriors, Grand Rapids Blazers, Lincoln Comets and Omaha Mustangs and Rock Island Raiders franchises joined the Joliet Explorers as charter members of the league. The PFLA evolved from the disbanded United Football League and began play in the fall of 1965.

In their first season of play, the Joliet Explorers won the 1965 Pro Football League of America championship. The Explorers ended the regular season with a record of 8–1–1 record, playing under head coach Jesse Vail. The Explorers tied for 1st place with the Grand Rapids Blazers, who also had an 8–1–1 record. During the season, Joliet had defeated Grand Rapids 34–16 in their season opener at home and tied the teams 10–10 playing at Grand Rapids on October 7, 1965. Following the regular season, two teams played a two-game playoff for the championship. On November 7, 1965, at Joliet Memorial Stadium, Joliet won the first game 7–3 in front of 4,600 fans. On November 14, 1965, Joliet captured the championship with a 12–6 victory at Grand Rapids. LeRoy Adams, Chuck Billings, Art Dillard, Ed Francois, Ken McGhie, Bill Mundee, Walt Nichols, Ron Parr and Togo Silvani of Joliet were named to the 1965 All–PFLA team

The 1966, Joliet Explorers continued PFLA play and finished in third place in the five–team league. For the 1966 league season, the Rock Island Raiders franchise became the Quad City Raiders and the Lincoln Comets franchise did not return to league of America play and were not replaced, with the league playing with five teams in 1966. The Joliet Explorers placed third in the standings with a record of 6–4, playing under head coach Bob Webb. Also serving as the Joliet quarterback, Bob Webb threw for 840 yards with 9 touchdown passes on the season. The Omaha Mustangs won the PFLA championship game, defeating the Des Moines Warriors. LeRoy Adams, Ollie Cromwell, Ralph Fahey, Ed Francois, Dave Mulderink, Bill Mundee and Togo Silvani of Joliet were awarded positions on the 1966 All–PFLA team.

In their final season of play, the Joliet Chargers captured the Pro Football League of America championship and fullback Paul Hudson of Joliet was named the PFLA's Most Valuable Player. To begin the 1967 season, the PFLA expanded, adding the Alabama Hawks, Chicago Owls and Oklahoma City Plainsmen franchises as expansion members. The 1967 league played in two divisions and Jesse Vail returned to coach Joliet. In May 1967, the Joliet franchise became an affiliate of the San Diego Chargers of the American Football League and changed their moniker to become the Joliet "Chargers" for the 1967 season. In 1967, the Alabama Hawks won the Western Division with a 9–3 record and hosted the league's championship game at Milton Frank Stadium, losing 31–20 to the Joliet Chargers, who had won the Eastern Division with a 10–2 record. LeRoy Adams, Paul Hudson, Walt Nichols and Sam Parham of the Chargers were named to the 1967 All–PFLA team.

The Pro Football League of America permanently folded following the 1967 season. In February 1968, the Continental Football League expanded to include some PFLA teams, but the Joliet franchise did not continue play in the Continental Football League.

== The stadium ==
In the 1964, 1965 and 1966 seasons the Joliet Explorers played football home games at Joliet Memorial Stadium. Opened in 1951, Joliet Memorial Stadium is still in use as a multi-purpose stadium. It is located at 3000 West Jefferson Street, Joliet, Illinois.

The 1967 Joliet Chargers were noted to have played home football games at "West Jefferson Stadium." This identification corresponds to the street location of Joliet Memorial Stadium.

== Season-by-season ==
	Year	League	W	L	T	Finish	Coach
Joliet Explorers	1964	United Football League	0	14	0	4th Eastern Division	Joe Petruzzi (0–4–0); Rocco Tarsitano (0–6–0) / Jack Morton (0–3–0)
Joliet Explorers	1965	Professional Football League of America	8	1	1	1st	Jesse Vail
Joliet Explorers	1966	Professional Football League of America	6	4	0	3rd	Bob Webb
Joliet Chargers	1967	Professional Football League of America	10	2	0	1st Eastern Division	Jesse Vail

== Notable alumni ==
- Bob Briggs (1967)
- Levert Carr (1967)
- Roy Curry (1964)
- Alvin Hall (1964)
- Gary Lewis (1964)
- Jack Morton (1964, Head Coach)
- John Seedborg (1964)
- Pat Shea (1967)
- Jesse Vail (1966, Head Coach)
- Jeff Williams (1967)
- Bob Zeman (1967, Asst. Coach)
- John Bauer (1965, former first round 1954 NFL pick)
