= Des Moines Warriors =

American football team

General information
- Founded: 1965
- Folded: 1967
- Stadium: Sec Taylor Stadium (1965–1967)
- Headquartered: Des Moines, Iowa (1965–1967)

League / conference affiliations
- Professional Football League of America (1965–1967)

Championships
- League championships: 0; 0, None
- Division championships: 0; 0, None

The Des Moines Warriors were a professional American football team based the Des Moines, Iowa from 1965 to 1967. In 1965, the Warriors became charter members of the Professional Football League of America (PFLA) and played exclusively in the league.

== History ==
In April 1961, a group of Des Moines investors applied to become a charter member of the Midwest Football League, but weren't chosen for league membership. Prospective teams were to pay a $2,000 fee if chosen to join the league and a $5,000 security deposit to ensure the full season would be played.

The Pro Football League of America (PFLA) began play in 1965, with the Des Moines Warriors becoming a charter franchise in the six–team league. Des Moines was a charter member, along with the Grand Rapids Blazers, Joliet Explorers, Lincoln Comets, Omaha Mustangs and Rock Island Raiders. The Pro Football League of America evolved from the disbanded United Football League and began play in the fall of 1965.

In their first season of play, the Des Moines Warriors ended the 1965 PFLA season with a record of 3–7, placing 4th in the final standings, playing under player/head coach Gale Gibson. On August 27, 1965, the Warriors won their league opening game, defeating the Rock Island Raiders 17–7 in front of 5,196 in attendance at Sec Taylor Stadium. On October 2, 1965 the Rock Island Raiders defeated the Des Moines Warriors 28–20 at Douglas Park for their only win of the season. Dave Clayberg, Primas Jones and Mark Manders of the Warriors were chosen to the 1965 All–PFLA team.

In 1966, the Des Moines Warriors continued PFLA play and established an affiliation with the Minnesota Vikings. The Rock Island Raiders franchise changed names to become the Quad City Raiders and the Lincoln Comets franchise did not return to PFLA play and were not replaced, with the league playing the 1966 season with five teams. The Des Moines Warriors finished in a first place tie with Omaha in the standings with a record of 8–2, playing under head coach Don Branby. The Omaha Mustangs won the PFLA championship game, defeating the Des Moines Warriors 27–7 at Johnny Rosenblatt Stadium in Omaha. Warrior players Mel Boehland, Bob Hall, Mark Manders, John McSwaney, Bob Miranda, Steve Valasek and John Van Sicklen were named to the 1966 All–PFLA team.

The Des Moines Warriors played their final season in 1967, also the final season of play of the PFLA. To begin the season, the league had expanded, adding the Alabama Hawks, Chicago Owls and Oklahoma City Plainsmen franchises. The 1967 league played in two divisions, with Des Moines placed in the Eastern Division. The Des Moines Warriors finished the in 3rd place in the division, with a 7–4–1 record, playing under returning head coach Don Branby. The team's final win was a 70–7 victory over the Quad City Raiders on November 4, 1967 at Sec Taylor Stadium. In 1967, the Alabama Hawks won the Western Division with a 9–3 record and lost the league's championship game 31–20 to the Joliet Chargers, who had won the Eastern Division with a 10–2 record. Des Moines players Bob Antulov, Mel Boehland, Ron Halda, Mark Manders and John Powers were named to the final All–PFLA team.

The PFLA permanently folded following the 1967 season. In February 1968, the Continental Football League expanded to include some PFLA teams, but Des Moines did not continue play in the Continental Football League and the franchise folded.

== The stadiums ==
For their duration, the Des Moines Warriors played home football games at Sec Taylor Stadium. Still in use today, the stadium has been remodeled and is known as Principal Park, home of the Iowa Cubs of minor league baseball.

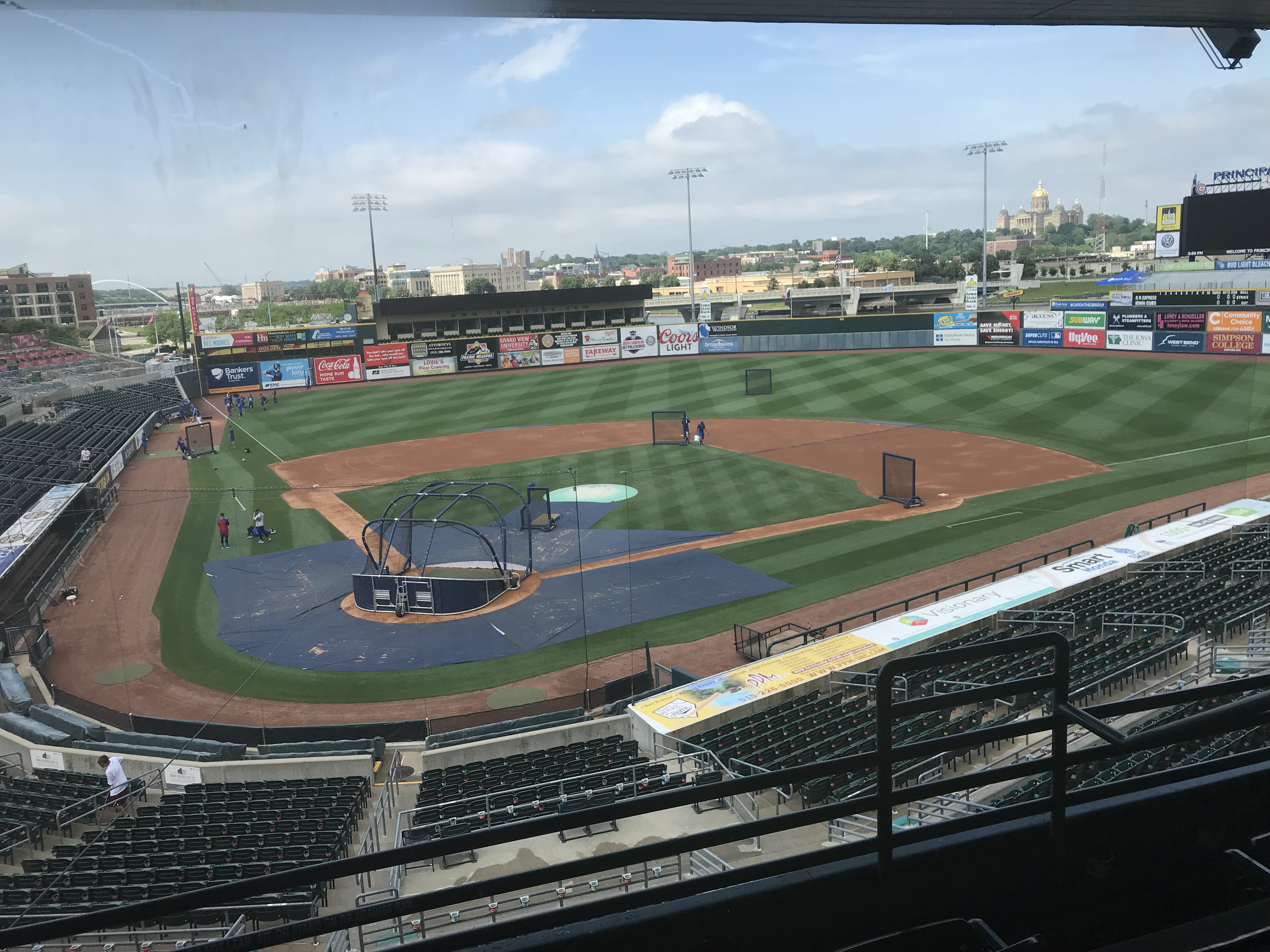
(2019) Principal Park. Des Moines, Iowa

== Season-by-season ==
	Year	League	W	L	T	Finish	Coach
Des Moines Warriors	1965	Professional Football League of America	3	7	0	4th	Gale Gibson
Des Moines Warriors	1966	Professional Football League of America	8	2	0	2nd	Don Branby
Des Moines Warriors	1967	Professional Football League of America	7	4	1	3rd Eastern Division	Don Branby

== Notable alumni ==
- Ron Acks (1966–1967)
- Tony Baker (1967)
- Bobby Bryant (1967) 2x All–Pro
- Don Branby (1966–1967, Head Coach)
- Al Coleman (1967)
- Nat Craddock (1967)
- Randy Duncan (1965), (1965–1966, Asst. Coach)
- Pat Hodgson (1967)
- Chuck Muelhaupt (1965, Asst. Coach)
- John Powers (1967)
- Stan Quintana (1966)
- Bill Reichardt (1965, Asst. Coach)
- Jerry Shay (1967)
- Dave Tobey (1967)
- Sharron Washington (1967)
