= B. W. Cheeks =

American football player (1941–1973)

- Cheeks, circa 1966

No. 40, 22, 44, 41
- Position: Halfback

Personal information
- Born: August 2, 1941; Hearne, Texas, U.S.
- Died: April 20, 1973 (aged 31); Houston, Texas, U.S.
- Listed height: 6 ft 1 in (1.85 m)
- Listed weight: 229 lb (104 kg)

Career information
- High school: Wheatley (Houston)
- College: Texas Southern (1960–1963)
- NFL draft: 1964: undrafted

Career history
- Charleston Rockets (1964); Kansas City Chiefs (1965)*; Mobile Tarpons (1965); Houston Oilers (1965); BC Lions (1966)*; Mobile Tarpons (1966); Omaha Mustangs (1967); Charleston Rockets (1968)*; Michigan Arrows (1968); West Texas Rufneks (1969)
- * Offseason or practice squad member only
- Stats at Pro Football Reference

Billy Wayne Cheeks Jr. (August 2, 1941 – April 20, 1973), born Will Cheeks Jr., was an American professional football halfback who played for the Houston Oilers of the American Football League (AFL). He played college football at Texas Southern.

== Early life ==
Will Cheeks Jr. was born on August 2, 1941, in Hearne, Texas. He played high school football at Wheatley High School in Houston, Texas, as a fullback. He was also a sprinter on the track team.

== College career ==
In May 1960, Cheeks signed his letter of intent to play college football for the Texas Southern Tigers. He was a member of the Tigers from 1960 to 1963.

== Professional career ==
In July 1964, Cheeks signed with the Charleston Rockets of the United Football League.

On February 26, 1965, Cheeks was signed by the Kansas City Chiefs of the American Football League (AFL). On July 17, during training camp, Cheeks was granted an emergency leave by the Chiefs after learning that his one-month-old son had smothered in his bed. He was released on July 24, 1965.

Cheeks played for the Mobile Tarpons of the North American Football League (NAFL) during the 1965 season, leading the league with over 1,500 rushing yards while averaging 6.4 yards per carry, scoring five rushing touchdowns, and catching two touchdowns. In November, BC Lions assistant coach Jim Champion flew Cheeks to Vancouver. Cheeks signed a contract with the Lions for the 1966 CFL season. Tarpons general manager William Menton accused the Lions of tampering. Cheeks returned to the Tarpons for the NAFL title game on November 24, which they lost 40–13 to the Annapolis Sailors.

On November 26, 1965, Cheeks was signed by the AFL's Houston Oilers after halfback Sid Blanks suffered an injury. Cheeks played in two games for the Oilers during the 1965 NFL season, returning one kick for 19 yards before fumbling the ball at the 20-yard line. On December 26, 1965, he was named first-team All-NAFL for his performance during the 1965 NAFL season.

Cheeks' prior signing with the BC Lions was officially announced on February 10, 1966. On May 17, 1966, he signed with the Baltimore Colts of the National Football League. However, the contract was voided after it was discovered that he had already signed with the Lions for the 1966 season. On July 2, 1966, it was reported that Cheeks had been released by the Lions.

Cheeks returned to the Tarpons for the 1966 NAFL season, scoring three rushing touchdowns and one receiving touchdown. He played for the Omaha Mustangs of the Professional Football League of America in 1967, rushing 134 times for 418 yards and six touchdowns while also catching 19 passes for 236 yards and two touchdowns.

In 1968, Cheeks signed with the Charleston Rockets again, now a member of the Continental Football League (COFL). On August 24, 1968, it was reported that he had left the team on his own. He then played for the Michigan Arrows during the 1968 COFL season, recording six carries for 37 yards and one punt return for one yard. Cheeks finished his pro football career with the COFL's West Texas Rufneks in 1969, totaling 85 rushing attempts for 341 yards and four touchdowns, 17 catches for 135 yards, and one kickoff return for 26 yards.

== Death ==
On April 20, 1973, Cheeks was shot and killed by a woman at the 20 Grand Club in Houston. He reportedly pulled the woman off her chair by the hair. No charges were filed.
