= Quad City Raiders =

Quad City Raiders (1966–1968) Rock Island Raiders (1965)

General information
- Founded: 1965
- Folded: 1968
- Stadium: Douglas Park (1965); Memorial Stadium (1966–1968)
- Headquartered: Rock Island, Illinois (1965); Davenport, Iowa (1966–1968)

Personnel
- Owner: Thomas Redmond (1968)

League / conference affiliations
- Professional Football League of America (1965–1967); Continental Football League (1968)

Championships
- League championships: 0; 0, None
- Division championships: 0; 0, None

The Quad City Raiders were a professional American football team based in the Quad Cities region, which includes Rock Island, Illinois and neighboring Davenport, Iowa. In 1965, the Raiders joined the Professional Football League of America (PFLA) as the Rock Island Raiders became charter members. The Quad City Raiders remained in the PFLA until its merger with the Continental Football League in 1968, with the franchise evolving to become the Las Vegas Cowboys.

== History ==
The Pro Football League of America (PFLA) began play in 1965, with the Rock Island Raiders becoming a charter franchise in the six–team league. The Des Moines Warriors, Grand Rapids Blazers, Joliet Explorers, Lincoln Comets and Omaha Mustangs franchises joined the Rock Island Raiders as charter members of the league. The Professional Football League of America evolved from the disbanded United Football League, and began play in the fall of 1965. The Rock Island Raiders were preceded in Rock Island, Illinois professional football play by the Rock Island Independents, who were an original National Football League franchise before disbanding in 1926.

In their first season of play, the Rock Island Raiders ended the 1965 PFLA season in last place with a record of 1–9, playing under head coach Paul Suverkrup. On October 2, 1965 the Raiders defeated the Des Moines Warriors 28–20 at Douglas Park for their only win of the season. The Joliet Explorers won the PFLA championship.

In 1966, the Rock Island Raiders franchise changed names and location to become the "Quad City" Raiders, playing home games in neighboring Davenport, Iowa. The Lincoln Comets franchise did not return to Pro Football League of America play and were not replaced, with the PFLA playing 1966 with five teams. The Quad City Raiders again finished last in the standings with a record of 1–9, playing under head coach Frank Abbott. The Raiders one league win was a forfeit to the disbanded Grand Rapids Shamrocks franchise. The Raiders did win two non league games, defeating the Canton Centaurs, playing in Canton, Illinois and Kansas City All Stars, in a game played in Rock Island, Illinois. The Omaha Mustangs won the PFLA championship game, defeating the Des Moines Warriors. Chuck McLeod of the Quad Cities was named to the 1966 All–PFLA team.

The Quad Cities Raiders continued play in 1967, the final season of the Pro Football League of America. To begin the season, the PFLA had expanded, adding the Alabama Hawks, Chicago Owls and Oklahoma City Plainsmen franchises. The 1967 league played in two divisions, with the Quad Cities placed in the Western Division. The Quad City Raiders finished the season winless, with an 0–12 record, playing under head coach Jack Morton and finishing 3rd in their division. In 1967, the Alabama Hawks won the Western Division with a 9–3 record and lost the league's championship game 31–20 to the Joliet Chargers, who had won the Eastern Division with a 10–2 record.

The PFLA permanently folded following the 1967 season. In February 1968, the Continental Football League expanded to include some PFLA teams and the Quad Cities Raiders briefly continued play in the Continental Football League.

In 1968, the Quad Cities Raiders started their initial Continental Football League season with an 0–2 record before the franchise relocated. After losing their first two games in 1968 and coming off of a 21–9 home loss to the Chicago Owls, the Raiders were scheduled to play their next week's game at the Indianapolis Capitols. In the week preceding the game, Indianapolis businessman Thomas Redmond purchased the Quad Cities franchise and announced the franchise would relocate to Las Vegas, Nevada and become the Las Vegas Cowboys. The new Las Vegas Cowboys subsequently lost to the Indianapolis Capitols, 41–0 on September 14, 1968.

At the time the Quad Cities Raiders relocated to Las Vegas, a Las Vegas Cowboys franchise was playing as members of the Western Football League, with Las Vegas holding a 1–1 record in that league. The franchise then forfeited the Cowboys' remaining Western Football League games, leaving that league to play the remainder of the 1968 Continental Football League schedule. Featuring five players from the Quad Cities roster and compiling a 1–9 record based in Las Vegas, the Quad Cities/Las Vegas team finished the 1968 season with a 1–11 overall record.

Later, a "Quad City Raiders" team played football as members of the amateur Mid States Football League, beginning in 2012.

== The stadiums ==
In 1965, the Rock Island Raiders played football home games at Douglas Park. The Raiders were preceded in football play at Douglas Park by the Rock Island Independents, who were an original National Football League franchise. On September 26, 1920, the Rock Island Independents had hosted the first NFL game ever played at Douglas Park. Douglas Park is still in use today as a public park. It is located at 18th Avenue and 9th Street, Rock Island, Illinois.

From 1966 to 1968, the Quad Cities Raiders played home football games at Memorial Stadium in Davenport, Iowa. Memorial Park is still in use today, known as Modern Woodmen Park, as home to the Quad City River Bandits of minor league baseball.

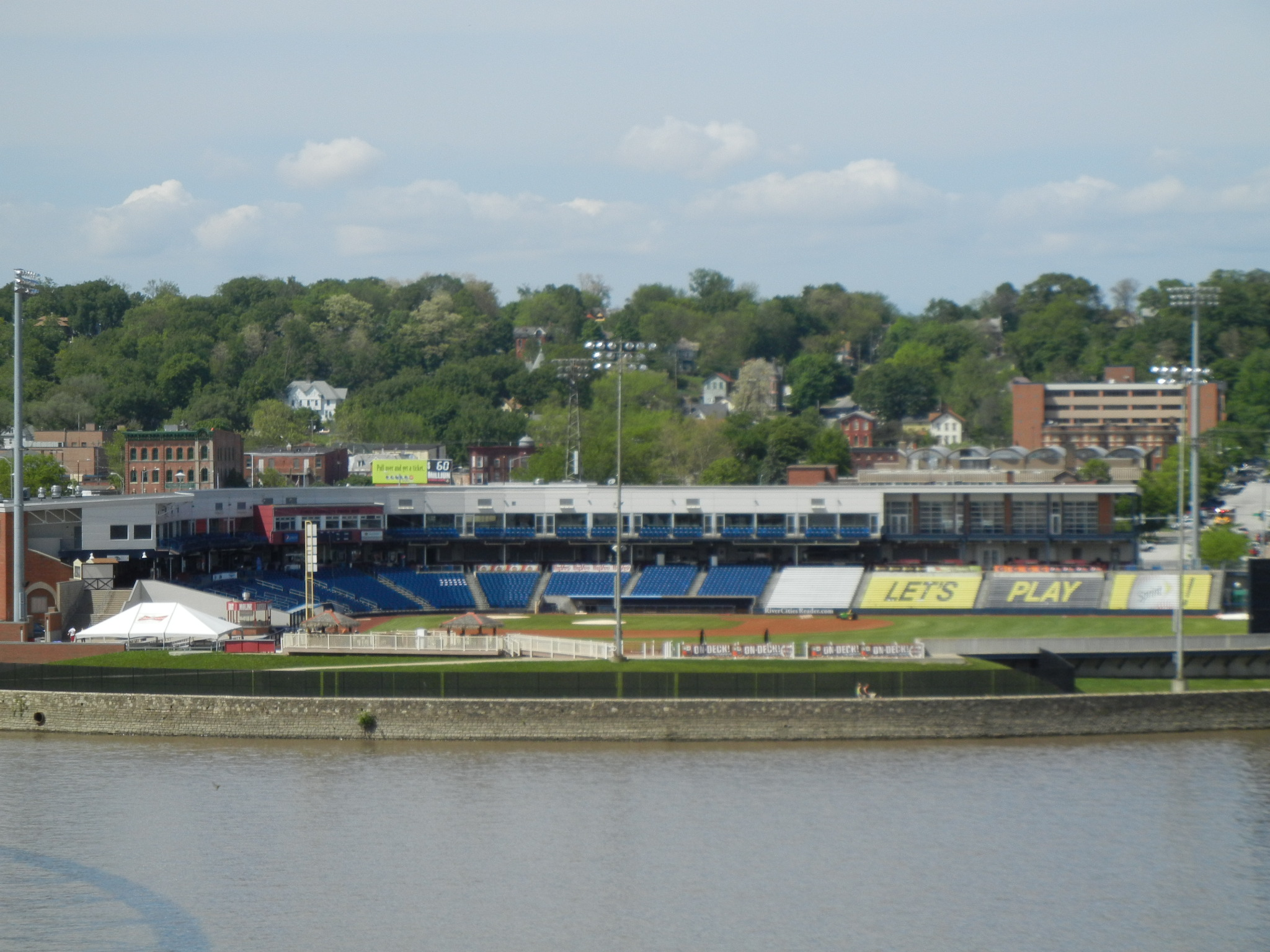
(2012) Modern Woodmen Park. Davenport, Iowa

== Season-by-season ==
	Year	League	W	L	T	Finish	Coach
Rock Island Raiders	1965	Professional Football League of America	1	9	0	6th	Paul Suverkrup
Quad Cities Raiders	1966	Professional Football League of America	1	9	0	5th	Frank Abbott
Quad Cities Raiders	1967	Professional Football League of America	0	12	0	3rd Western Division	Jack Morton
Quad Cities Raiders Las Vegas Cowboys	1968	Continental Football League	1	11	0	6th Central Division	Bobby Peck / Duane Allen

== Notable alumni ==
- Don Carothers (1965), (1968, Asst. Coach)
- Jack Morton (1966, Head Coach)
