= Levert Carr =

American football player (born 1944)

No. 53, 71, 74, 62, 63
- Positions: Offensive lineman, defensive lineman

Personal information
- Born: June 30, 1944 (age 82); Birmingham, Alabama, U.S.
- Listed height: 6 ft 2 in (1.88 m)
- Listed weight: 273 lb (124 kg)

Career information
- High school: Buchtel (Akron, Ohio)
- College: North Central

Career history
- Joliet Explorers (1965); Pittsburgh Steelers (1967)*; Joliet Chargers (1967); San Diego Chargers (1968)*; Las Vegas Cowboys (1968); San Diego Chargers (1969); Pittsburgh Steelers (1970)*; Buffalo Bills (1970–1971); Houston Oilers (1972–1973); Chicago Bears (1974)*; Portland Storm (1974)
- * Offseason or practice squad member only
- Stats at Pro Football Reference

Levert F. Carr (born June 30, 1944) is an American former professional football player who played five seasons in the National Football League (NFL) and American Football League (AFL). He played college football at Independence Community College and North Central College.

== Early life and college ==
Levert F. Carr was born on June 30, 1944, in Birmingham, Alabama. He attended John R. Buchtel High School in Akron, Ohio.

Carr first played college football at Independence Community College before transferring to North Central College.

== Professional career ==
Carr was a member of the Joliet Explorers of the Professional Football League of America (PFLA) as a defensive tackle in 1965.

He signed with the Pittsburgh Steelers of the National Football League (NFL) in 1967 but was later released on July 16, 1967.

Carr was a member of the renamed Joliet Chargers of the PFLA in 1967.

He was signed by the San Diego Chargers of the American Football League in 1968 but later released.

He played for the Las Vegas Cowboys of the Continental Football League in 1968 as an offensive tackle and wore jersey number 53.

Carr signed with the Chargers again in 1969 and played in seven games during the 1969 NFL season as a defensive end, recording one sack. On August 11, 1970, it was reported that Carr had been waived by the Chargers.

He then signed with the Steelers again in August 1970 before being waived on September 1, 1970.

Carr later played in seven games for the Buffalo Bills of the NFL during the 1970 season as an offensive tackle. He started all 14 games for the Bills in 1971, spending time at both offensive guard and offensive tackle. The team finished the season with a 1–13 record.

Carr was purchased by the Houston Oilers in 1972 and started all 14 games that season as the Oilers went 1–13. He played in 13 games, starting eight, in 1973 and recovered one fumble. In May 1974, while still under contract with the Oilers, Carr signed a contract with the Portland Storm of the World Football League (WFL). He participated in the 1974 NFL players strike that lasted from July 1, 1974, to August 10, 1974. He was waived by the Oilers on August 14, 1974.

Carr was claimed off waivers by the Chicago Bears on August 13, 1974. He was released on September 4, 1974.

Carr played for the Portland Storm during the 1974 WFL season. He suffered a knee injury that caused him to miss the final six games of the 1974 season. The Storm folded after the season. In May 1975, Carr was selected by the San Antonio Wings of the WFL in an expansion draft.
