= Lincoln Comets =

General information
- Founded: 1965
- Folded: 1965
- Stadium: Seacrest Field (1965); Pius X Stadium (1965)
- Headquartered: Lincoln, Nebraska (1965)

League / conference affiliations
- Professional Football League of America (1965)

Championships
- League championships: 0; 0, None
- Division championships: 0; 0, None

The Lincoln Comets were a professional American football team based in Lincoln, Nebraska in 1965. The Comets joined the Professional Football League of America (PFLA) as charter members.

== History ==
The Professional Football League of America (PFLA) began play in 1965, with the Lincoln Comets becoming a charter franchise in the six–team league. The Des Moines Warriors, Grand Rapids Blazers, Joliet Explorers, Omaha Mustangs and Rock Island Raiders franchises joined Lincoln as charter members of the PFLA. The Professional Football League of America evolved from the disbanded United Football League, and began play in the fall of 1965.

In their only season of play, the Lincoln Comets ended the 1965 PFLA season in 5th place with a record of 2–8, playing under head coach Don Erway. Lincoln played home games at Seacrest Field. Lincoln won a pre–league game 58–6 against the Kansas City Buffaloes on August 14, 1965. Beginning the regular season, the Comets were defeated by the Omaha Mustangs 48–21 in front of 13,440 fans at Omaha on August 28, 1965. In their home opener the next week, Lincoln drew 4,589 fans in a loss to the Joliet Explorers. On September 25, 1965 the Comets defeated the Rock Island Raiders 27–21 at Douglas Park for their first win of the season. After four straight losses, Lincoln defeated Rock Island in their final home game 72–7 in front of 1,008 at Pius X Stadium. The Joliet Explorers won the 1965 PFLA championship.

Mike Eger of Lincoln and the Nebraska Cornhuskers football team was named to the 1965 All–PFLA team as a tight end. Eger caught 55 passes for 597 yards (10.9 average) and 2 touchdowns.

Lincoln quarterback Doug Tucker (University of Nebraska) completed 156 of 312 passes for 1830 yards and 14 touchdowns on the season. Tucker threw for 452 yards and 8 touchdowns against the Rock Island Raiders on 10/31/65.

In 1966, the Lincoln Comets franchise did not return to Pro Football League of America play and were not replaced, as the PFLA played the 1966 season with five teams.

== The stadiums ==
In 1965, the Lincoln Comets were noted to have played football home games at Seacrest Field. Seacrest Field is still in use today as a football venue. It is located at 7400 A Street, Lincoln, Nebraska.

The Lincoln Comets reportedly played their final 1965 home game, a win against the Rock Island Raiders, at Pius X Stadium. Pius X High School was established in 1956 and is located at 6000 A Street, Lincoln, Nebraska.

== Season-by-season ==
| | Year | League | W | L | T | Finish | Coach |
|---|---|---|---|---|---|---|---|
| Lincoln Comets | 1965 | Professional Football League of America | 2 | 8 | 0 | 5th | Don Erway |

== Notable alumni ==
Head coach Don Erway was a Lincoln, Nebraska native who also played football and baseball at the University of Nebraska.
