= Don Carothers =

American football player (1934–2008)

No. 86
- Position: Offensive end

Personal information
- Born: May 13, 1934; Moline, Illinois, U.S.
- Died: September 18, 2008 (aged 74); Wilson, North Carolina, U.S.
- Listed height: 6 ft 5 in (1.96 m)
- Listed weight: 225 lb (102 kg)

Career information
- High school: Moline
- College: Bradley (1955–1957)
- NFL draft: 1957: 10th round, 118th overall pick

Career history
- Chicago Cardinals (1958)*; Denver Broncos (1960); Rock Island Raiders (1965)
- * Offseason or practice squad member only

Career AFL statistics
- Receptions: 2
- Receiving yards: 25
- Stats at Pro Football Reference

Donald E. "Crutch" Carothers (May 13, 1934 – September 19, 2008) was an American football offensive end who played one season with the Denver Broncos of the American Football League (AFL). He was selected by the Chicago Cardinals in the tenth round of the 1957 NFL draft after playing college football at Bradley University.

== Early life ==
Carothers participated in high school football, basketball and track at Moline High School in Moline, Illinois. He was a member of the 1951 Maroons basketball team that finished second in the state. He also won the Illinois state high jump title for three consecutive years.

== College career ==
Carothers first attended the University of Iowa on a basketball scholarship. He transferred to Bradley University and was a letterman in football, basketball and track for the Braves. He was a member of the Braves basketball team that won the 1957 NIT championship. Carothers was also the team's leading receiver and punter in football his senior season. He was later inducted into the Bradley University Athletic Hall of Fame.

== Professional career ==
Carothers was selected by the Chicago Cardinals of the National Football League (NFL) in the tenth round with the 118th overall pick in the 1957 NFL draft. He signed with the Cardinals on June 3, 1958, after his senior year at Bradley. He was released by the Cardinals on September 15, 1958. Carothers signed with the AFL's Denver Broncos in 1960 and played in three games for the team during the 1960 season.

Carothers played for the Rock Island Raiders of the Professional Football League of America in 1965, catching seven passes for 93 yards while also punting six times for 185 yards. He was an assistant coach for the renamed Quad City Raiders of the Continental Football League in 1968.

== Personal life ==
Carothers worked as an insurance agent and also in the investment field after his football career. He was later the owner of the Carothers Insurance Company in Bettendorf, Iowa. He also was the general manager of the Quad City Raiders, which played in the Continental Football League.
