= Glen Hepburn =

American football player (1938–1968)

No. 81
- Positions: End, linebacker

Personal information
- Born: November 4, 1938
- Died: September 12, 1968 (aged 29); Detroit, Michigan, U.S.
- Listed height: 6 ft 4 in (1.93 m)
- Listed weight: 215 lb (98 kg)

Career information
- High school: Boys Town (NE)
- College: Nebraska; Butler CC; Nebraska–Omaha

Career history
- Denver Broncos (1963)*; Omaha Mustangs (1964–1968)
- * Offseason or practice squad member only

Gleanville Ervin Hepburn (November 4, 1938 – September 12, 1968) was an American football end and linebacker who played five seasons for the Omaha Mustangs in the Professional Football League of America (PFLA) and Continental Football League (COFL). He died on September 12, 1968, following head injuries received during a game against the Michigan Arrows.

== Early life and education ==
Hepburn was born on November 4, 1938, though the year has been listed by some sources to be 1937 or 1936. He moved to Boys Town, Nebraska, following his graduation from Father Flanagan's Boys' Home. He attended high school at Boys Town, which led to him being offered a scholarship from the University of Nebraska–Lincoln. A school spokesman at Boys Town described him as, "was one of the finest boys ever to attend Boys’ Town. He's well remembered here and not just because he worked here. He was one of the first Negro boys to be elected mayor and maybe the best football player ever." He played one season for Nebraska's freshman football team, the Cornhuskers. An article by the Lincoln Journal Star called him an "outstanding freshman lineman at Nebraska U. in 1956". Shortly afterwards he transferred to Butler Community College in El Dorado, Kansas, where he attended until 1961. Afterwards he moved to Nebraska–Omaha. He was listed by The Benson Sun as a potential JV award candidate. He graduated following 1962; he was ruled ineligible to play for the season.

== Professional career ==
Following college he had a brief stint with the Denver Broncos of the American Football League (AFL), but was released before the season start. Following the season he helped create the Omaha Mustangs professional football team. He played the 1964–1968 seasons with the Mustangs, as members of the Professional Football League of America (PFLA) and Continental Football League (CoFL). He was a two-way player, as an end on offense and linebacker of defense.

== Injury and death ==
In the second week of the 1968 season in a game versus the Michigan Arrows, Hepburn was knocked unconscious in a pileup of players. He was rushed to the Martin Place East Hospital, where he remained in serious condition and fell into a coma that night. Doctors later said he suffered a brief heart stoppage and ruptured blood vessel in the brain on the play. "His condition just got gradually worse," a doctor at the hospital said. He died from his injuries on September 12. He was buried in Miami, Florida, his hometown.

In 1969, the Continental Football League created the Glen Hepburn Memorial Award, given to those who help in community service. Nebraska–Omaha University also made an award to honor him, the Glen Hepburn Trophy, given to those who display defensive excellence.

== See also ==
- List of gridiron football players who died during their careers
