= John Powers (tight end) =

American football player (1940–1978)

No. 88, 80, 83
- Position: Tight end

Personal information
- Born: June 15, 1940; Harvard, Illinois, U.S.
- Died: January 12, 1978 (aged 37); Rockford, Illinois, U.S.
- Listed height: 6 ft 2 in (1.88 m)
- Listed weight: 215 lb (98 kg)

Career information
- High school: Campion Preparatory School
- College: Notre Dame
- NFL draft: 1962: 9th round, 117th overall pick

Career history

Playing
- Pittsburgh Steelers (1962–1965); Minnesota Vikings (1966); Des Moines Warriors (1967); Chicago Owls (1968-1969)

Coaching
- Chicago Owls (1968-1969) Assistant coach

Career NFL statistics
- Receptions: 9
- Receiving yards: 209
- Stats at Pro Football Reference

John Paul Powers (June 15, 1940 – January 12, 1978), born John Paul Theiss, was an American college and professional football player who was a tight end in the National Football League (NFL) for five seasons during the 1960s.

He was born in Harvard, Illinois. Powers attended the University of Notre Dame, where he played for the Notre Dame Fighting Irish football team. He graduated from Notre Dame with a bachelor's degree, and later earned a master's degree in rehabilitation administration from DePaul University.

He was chosen by the Pittsburgh Steelers in the ninth round (117th overall pick) of the 1962 NFL draft. He played for the Steelers from 1962 to 1965. He played a fifth a final season for the NFL's Minnesota Vikings in 1966. He appeared in 49 regular season games during his five-year NFL career, mostly as a blocking lineman. He had his most productive receiving year for the Steelers in 1964, when he had eight catches for 198 yards, with an impressive 24.1 yards per reception average.

Powers subsequently was a player-coach for the Des Moines Warriors and coached the Chicago Owls football team of the Continental Football League. He died on January 12, 1978; he was 37 years old.

== See also ==
- List of DePaul University alumni
- List of University of Notre Dame alumni
