= Craig Gilliam =

American football player and coach (born 1945)

Biographical details
- Born: 1945 (age 80–81)

Playing career
- 1963–1966: Tennessee State
- 1967: Alabama Hawks
- Position: Cornerback

Coaching career (HC unless noted)
- 1992: Tennessee State (DC)
- 1993–1994: Lane

Craig Gilliam (born 1945) is an American former football player and coach. He served as the head football coach at Lane College in Jackson, Tennessee from 1993 to 1994.
