= Terry Stone (American football) =

Profile
- Position: Quarterback

Personal information
- Born: c. 1946
- Died: July 16, 2021; California, U.S.
- Listed height: 6 ft 1 in (1.85 m)
- Listed weight: 190 lb (86 kg)

Career information
- High school: Highland (Albuquerque, NM)
- College: Baylor (1964–65): New Mexico (1966–1967)

Career history
- Las Vegas Cowboys (1969)

Terry Stone (1944 – July 16, 2021) was an American football quarterback. He played college football for New Mexico in 1966 to 1967. He previously attended Baylor but saw no game action. In 1967, Stone ranked among the leading quarterbacks in major-college football with 405 total plays (1st), 160 pass completions (1st), 336 pass attempts (1st), 1,967 passing yards (3rd), 194.6 yards gained per game (194.6 (3rd), and 19 interceptions (2nd).

Stone also played professional football for the Las Vegas Cowboys in 1969. He died in 2021 at age 75.
