= Arunas Vasys =

Lithuanian-born player of American football (1943–2024)

No. 61, 50
- Position: Linebacker

Personal information
- Born: August 18, 1943; German-occupied Lithuania
- Died: July 5, 2024 (aged 80); Naples, Florida, U.S.
- Listed height: 6 ft 2 in (1.88 m)
- Listed weight: 235 lb (107 kg)

Career information
- High school: St. Philip (Chicago, Illinois, U.S.)
- College: Notre Dame (1962–1965)
- NFL draft: 1966: 16th round, 234th overall pick

Career history
- Philadelphia Eagles (1966–1968); Chicago Owls (1969)

Career NFL statistics
- Sacks: 0.5
- Stats at Pro Football Reference

Arunas Bruno Vasys (August 18, 1943 – July 5, 2024) was a Lithuanian professional American football linebacker who played three seasons with the Philadelphia Eagles of the National Football League (NFL). He was selected by the Eagles in the sixteenth round of the 1966 NFL draft. He played college football at the University of Notre Dame.

== Early life and college ==
Arunas Bruno Vasys was born on August 18, 1943, in German-occupied Lithuania. His family later moved to the United States, briefly living in New York before settling in Chicago. He participated in football, basketball, and track at St. Philip High School in Chicago.

After receiving over 60 scholarship offers to play college football, Vasys chose the Notre Dame Fighting Irish of the University of Notre Dame. He was on the freshman team in 1962. He made the main roster in 1963 and was a two-year letterman from 1964 to 1965. He wore jersey number 36 with the Fighting Irish.

== Professional career ==
Vasys was selected by the Philadelphia Eagles in the 16th round, with the 234th overall pick, of the 1966 NFL draft. He officially signed with the team on February 3, 1966. He was released on August 31 and then signed to the Eagles' taxi squad. He was later promoted to the active roster and played in ten games during the 1966 season. Vasys appeared in nine games in 1967, recording 0.5 sacks and one kick return for no yards. He played in three games, all starts, for the Eagles in 1968. He retired on July 7, 1969.

Vasys came out of retirement and played for the Chicago Owls of the Continental Football League during the 1969 season, recording one interception.

== Personal life ==
After his NFL career, Vasys worked as a stockbroker, started a sales rep business, and also worked for New Balance. He had the New Balance logo tattooed on his arm. He also climbed Mount Rainier.

He died at his home in Naples, Florida, on July 5, 2024, at the age of 80.
