= Jerry Ahlin =

American gridiron football player (born 1945)

Profile
- Position: Linebacker

Personal information
- Born: August 12, 1945 (age 81); Boise, Idaho, U.S.
- Listed height: 6 ft 4 in (1.93 m)
- Listed weight: 225 lb (102 kg)

Career information
- High school: Borah HS, Boise, Idaho
- College: University of Idaho

Career history
- 1969: Hamilton Tiger-Cats

Jerry Ahlin (born August 12, 1945) was an American professional football linebacker who played for the Hamilton Tiger-Cats of the Canadian Football League. He played in one game in 1969.

After college at the University of Idaho where he played defensive end and quarterback, Jerry was signed by the Dallas Cowboys but was the last player cut before the season began. He was sent to play with the Oklahoma City Plainsmen 1967, a member of the Professional Football League of America. As a minor league team, the Plainsmen had a working agreement with the Cowboys.

Ahlin was Green Bay Packers guard Jerry Kramer's paperboy as a young man in Boise, and is mentioned in Kramer's book "Instant Replay."
