= American Academy =

American Academy may refer to:

- American Academy, an online college proposed by the Donald Trump campaign in the 2024 United States presidential election
- American Academy of Arts and Sciences, frequently known as the American Academy, an honorary society and center for policy research
- American Academy for Liberal Education, an educational accreditation agency
- American Academy in Berlin, a research and cultural institution
- American Academy in Rome, a research and arts institution
- American Academy of Arts and Letters
- American Academy of Larnaca, a private school in Larnaca, Cyprus
- Dubai American Academy, a private school
- Üsküdar American Academy, a private school in Istanbul

== See also ==
- National_academy#Academies by country
