= Bobby Bryant =

American football player (born 1944)

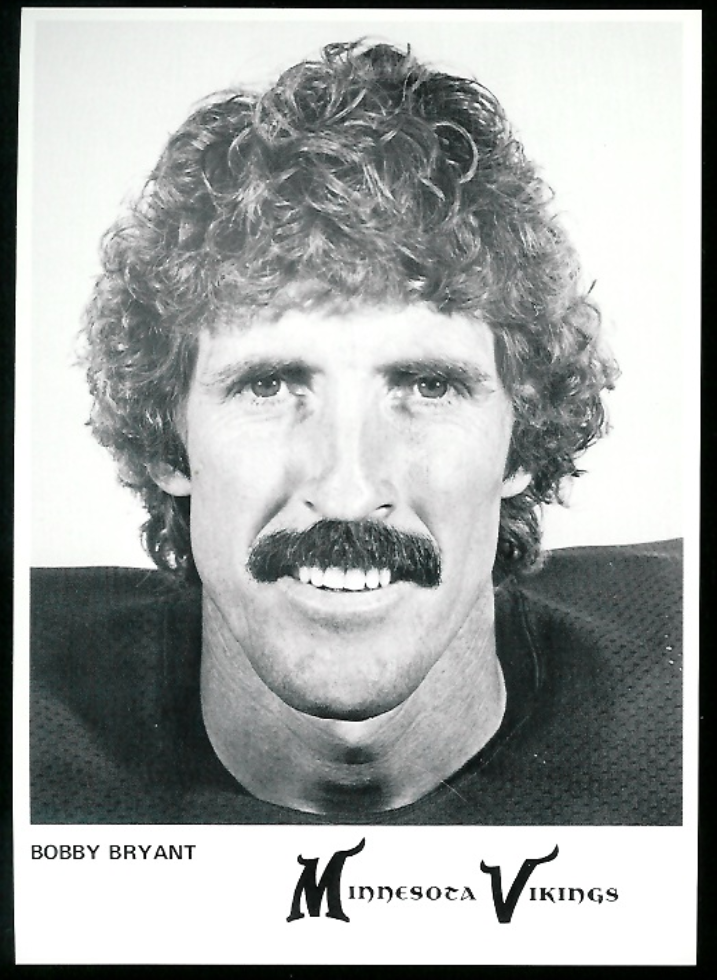
- Bryant in 1978

No. 20
- Position: Cornerback

Personal information
- Born: January 24, 1944 (age 82); Macon, Georgia, U.S.
- Listed height: 6 ft 1 in (1.85 m)
- Listed weight: 170 lb (77 kg)

Career information
- High school: Willingham (Macon)
- College: South Carolina (1963–1966)
- NFL draft: 1967: 7th round, 167th overall pick

Career history
- Des Moines Warriors (1967); Minnesota Vikings (1968–1980)

Awards and highlights
- NFL champion (1969); Second-team All-Pro (1969); 2× Pro Bowl (1975, 1976); Minnesota Vikings Ring of Honor; 50 Greatest Vikings; Minnesota Vikings 25th Anniversary Team; Minnesota Vikings 40th Anniversary Team; Second-team All-American (1966); ACC Athlete of the Year (1967); First-team All-ACC (1966)

Career NFL statistics
- Interceptions: 51
- Interception yards: 749
- Fumble recoveries: 14
- Total touchdowns: 4
- Stats at Pro Football Reference

Bobby Bryant (born January 24, 1944) is an American former professional football player who was a cornerback who played for the Minnesota Vikings of the National Football League (NFL). He played college football for the South Carolina Gamecocks.

== Early life ==
At Willingham High School, he was a star in football along with basketball, track and field, and baseball. Bryant was recruited to play for the University of South Carolina by Weems Baskin in 1963. Baskin was both the track coach and a football assistant, but Bryant (nicknamed "Bones" owing to his lanky frame) ended up playing both baseball and football, for which he would earn a letter for three years with each sport. He was awarded the ACC Athlete of the Year in 1967. He is the first and only athlete from South Carolina to have won the award along with the first Gamecock to have struck out 100 batters in a season. Bryant, who served as pitcher for the Gamecocks, was selected in the Major League Baseball Draft in his junior and senior seasons by the New York Yankees and the Boston Red Sox, respectively, but he decided to play with the Vikings when they drafted him.

In his senior season, Bryant set a school record with a 98-yard punt return against North Carolina State, assisting the team to a 31–21 win in what turned out to be their only victory of the year. Bryant also had a 77-yard punt return the season opening game against LSU. In 1979, Bryant was voted into the South Carolina athletic hall of fame.

== Football career ==
After knee injury during the pre-season with the Vikings kept him on the team's practice squad in 1967, Bryant spent his rookie season with the Des Moines Warriors from the minor Professional Football League of America (PFLA). A season later he began his career with the Vikings in 1968, which was also the same year that Paul Krause was traded to the team. Together they would play with each other for twelve seasons, and they would combine for 104 interceptions (with nine combined interceptions in playoff games).

Bryant was used as both a defensive back and a returner on punts and kicks for his rookie season, and he soon became known for blowing kisses to the crowd. He returned 19 kicks for 373 yards to go with ten punt returns for 49 yards. He had his first interception in his fourth game against the New Orleans Saints on October 13. He intercepted Billy Kilmer twice and returned one of the interceptions 51 yards for a touchdown. They were the only interceptions of his rookie season, for which he made no starts at the position. Bryant, given more playing time on the defensive part of the field, improved readily in 1969. Playing in ten games, he made eight interceptions, which would prove to be a career high. He ranked second in interceptions in the NFL next to Lem Barney (8) and Mel Renfro (10). It was the first of four seasons that Bryant would finish in the top ten for interceptions. It was also the first of four times that he led the Vikings in interceptions.

In the NFC Championship against the Dallas Cowboys on December 30, 1973, he returned a Roger Staubach pass 63 yards for a touchdown, which was at the time the longest interception return for a touchdown by a Viking.

Bryant returned to full strength in 1975. He played in each game and recorded six interceptions (good for seventh in the league). He was named to his first Pro Bowl that year. In 1976, he recorded just two interceptions but was named to the Pro Bowl once again. In the 1976 NFC Championship on December 26 against the Los Angeles Rams, he scored the first points of the game when he returned a blocked Tom Dempsey field goal kick 90 yards for a touchdown. He also recorded two interceptions off Pat Haden as the Vikings rolled on to make their fourth Super Bowl in franchise history, with Bryant being one of just eleven Vikings to have played in each of those Super Bowls.

Bryant had his last peak with 1978, as he recorded seven interceptions (which ranked as more than he had in his last two seasons combined). At the age of 36, Bryant played his last season in 1980. He did not record an interception for his first eight games, but he closed his career out with three in his last six games played, including his last one in the season finale against the Houston Oilers, doing so against Ken Stabler.

At the time of his retirement, Bryant ranked tenth all-time in interceptions, having become one of eighteen players at the time to have recorded 50 interceptions as a player. Since then, 21 have crossed the mark, and Bryant ranks 39th. He is second in interceptions as a Viking (51) next to Paul Krause. He also intercepted another six passes in his 14 postseason games, including three in the Vikings Super Bowl season of 1976.

== Personal life ==
In 1979, he was inducted into the University of South Carolina Athletic Hall of Fame. After retiring, he lived in Minnesota for five years before settling in Columbia, South Carolina and worked in sales for Harmon Autoglass, an auto glass replacement business.
