= Jim Hill High School =

Location
- Jackson, Mississippi; United States; 32°17′23″N 90°13′8″W

Information
- Type: Comprehensive Public High School
- Motto: Believe, Achieve, Succeed!
- Established: 1912
- School district: Jackson Public School District
- Principal: Bobby D. Brown
- Staff: 67.85 (FTE)
- Grades: 9 to 12
- Gender: Coed
- Enrollment: 876 (2023–2024)
- Student to teacher ratio: 12.91
- Colors: Green and Gold
- Team name: Tigers
- Newspaper: The Echo
- Website: www.jackson.k12.ms.us/jimhill

Jim Hill High School is a public high school located in Jackson, Mississippi, United States, hosting the state's first International Baccalaureate Diploma (IB) program. It hosts Advanced Placement courses, a JROTC, and a SOAR program. It was formerly a black school during the Jim Crow era.

== History ==
Jim Hill Public School was named in 1912 after politician James Hill (c. 1838–1903), a formerly enslaved man who served as Secretary of State of Mississippi during the Reconstruction era. Samuel Manual Brinkley (1878–1946) served as the school’s principal in the 1920s. The former building was established on Lynch Street as an elementary school and later served as a junior high school.

The current building was constructed in the 1960s in the Washington Addition neighborhood. The school was also formerly housed in a building that operated as Blackburn Middle School, where a new school was established in 2010.

The International Baccalaureate program hosted there was established in 1992. A new wing was added in 2001.

== Demographics ==
In the 2023–2024 school year, the enrollment was 876 students, and the school was 97.8% Black.

== Special programs ==
Jim Hill is one of two high schools in the state of Mississippi with the International Baccalaureate Diploma program. This school offers IB classes in biology, music, Spanish, visual arts, math, psychology, French, English literature, history, and theory of knowledge as well as the Middle Years Programme personal project course which serves as a prerequisite for the other IB courses.

The AP Program is also offered at the school.

== Feeder pattern ==
The following schools feed into Jim Hill High School:

- Middle Schools
  - Northwest Jackson Middle School (IB)
  - Peeples Middle School
- Elementary Schools
  - Isable Elementary School
  - Key Elementary School
  - Obama Magnet Elementary School (IB)
  - Shirley Elementary School
  - Wilkins Elementary School

== Notable alumni ==
- Al Coleman, former NFL defensive back (1967–1973)
- Roosevelt Davis, former NFL defensive end for the New York Giants (1965–1967)
- Jimmi Mayes, musician and author
- Richard Wright, author
- James Earl Green, victim of the Jackson State killings
