= Garo Yepremian =

Armenian-Cypriot American football player (1944–2015)

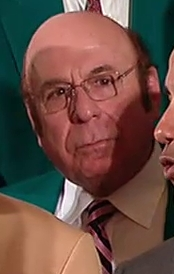
- Yepremian during the 1972 Dolphins White House visit in 2013

No. 1
- Position: Placekicker

Personal information
- Born: 2 June 1944; Larnaca, British Cyprus
- Died: 15 May 2015 (aged 70); Media, Pennsylvania, U.S.
- Listed height: 5 ft 8 in (1.73 m)
- Listed weight: 175 lb (79 kg)

Career information
- High school: American Academy of Larnaca (Larnaca, Cyprus)
- College: None
- NFL draft: 1966: undrafted

Career history
- Detroit Lions (1966–1967); Michigan Arrows (1969); Miami Dolphins (1970–1978); New Orleans Saints (1979); Tampa Bay Buccaneers (1980–1981)

Awards and highlights
- 2× Super Bowl champion (VII, VIII); 2× First-team All-Pro (1971, 1973); 2× Pro Bowl (1973, 1978); NFL scoring leader (1971); NFL 1970s All-Decade Team

Career NFL statistics
- Field goals attempted: 313
- Field goals made: 210
- Field goal percentage: 67.1%
- Longest field goal: 54
- Extra points attempted: 464
- Extra points made: 444
- Extra point percentage: 95.7%
- Points scored: 1,074
- Stats at Pro Football Reference

Garabed Sarkis "Garo" Yepremian (2 June 1944 – 15 May 2015) was an Armenian-Cypriot American football placekicker who played in the National Football League (NFL) for 15 seasons, primarily with the Miami Dolphins. During his nine seasons with the Dolphins, Yepremian led the league in scoring in 1971, received two Pro Bowl and two first-team All-Pro honors, and helped the Dolphins win back-to-back Super Bowl titles. Yepremian's first championship victory in Super Bowl VII occurred as a member of the 1972 Dolphins, the only team to complete a perfect season in NFL history. He also played for the Detroit Lions, New Orleans Saints and Tampa Bay Buccaneers before retiring in 1981.

== Early life ==
Yepremian was born in Larnaca, then in the British colony of Cyprus, to Armenian parents.

Yepremian and his brother, Krikor, who attended Indiana University on a soccer scholarship, immigrated to the United States when Garo was 22. Yepremian, who had earlier played in an organized soccer league in London, was not eligible to play college football. He was offered to play with Arsenal, but Krikor wanted his brother to play football in the United States. With Krikor acting as his agent, he earned a contract with the Detroit Lions.

== Professional career ==
Yepremian signed with the Detroit Lions on 13 October 1966. In his rookie year, he broke an American football record by kicking six field goals in a single game against the Minnesota Vikings on 13 November.

His talent aside, Yepremian was, nonetheless, at a loss regarding football vernacular and custom. In his first game his coach told him that their team had lost the coin toss, at which point Yepremian ran to midfield and dropped to his knees looking for the coin. Yepremian kicked off, then in a hurried state ran to the wrong bench, finding himself sitting with the opposing team who while laughing then picked him up and threw him back onto the field.

Yepremian had never worn a helmet and at first decided not to use one with a face mask, but that changed during Week 8 of the 1966 season, when he was knocked to the ground and badly injured by Green Bay Packers linebacker Ray Nitschke. Afterwards, he started using a single-bar mask. He was the last player in NFL history to not wear a facemask on his helmet.

Teammate Alex Karras told an anecdote on The Tonight Show Starring Johnny Carson that ended with Yepremian yelling "I keek (kick) a touchdown", Yepremian later stated this never happened.

After the 1967 season, Yepremian left football to enlist in the United States Army, even though he was not yet a citizen of the United States. When he returned to the Detroit area in 1968 the Lions chose not to re-sign him, so Yepremian signed a contract to be a kicker/punter for the Michigan Arrows of the Continental Football League. The Arrows, however, were a disaster on the field (1–11) and at the gate (drawing barely 4,000 fans a game) and folded at season's end.

After sitting out the 1969 season, Yepremian earned a spot on the Dolphins roster in 1970. In his first season with Miami, he converted all 31 extra point attempts and 22 of 29 field goal attempts. He led the NFL with 117 points in 1971, and in Super Bowl VI, he scored the only three Dolphin points against the Dallas Cowboys.

The next year, he was a key member of the 1972 Miami Dolphins "Perfect Season" team — he was the leading scorer and converted on many clutch field goals to help the Dolphins stay unbeaten. In the Divisional Round playoff game against the Kansas City Chiefs on Christmas Day 1971, he kicked a 37-yard field goal 7 minutes and 40 seconds into double overtime, ending the longest game in NFL history and sending the Dolphins to the AFC Championship against the Baltimore Colts .

Yepremian's success would be overshadowed in the popular imagination by an infamous moment in Super Bowl VII. With the Dolphins leading the Washington Redskins 14–0, Yepremian was sent on to the field to kick a field goal with slightly more than two minutes left. The field goal attempt was blocked by Bill Brundige, and Yepremian managed to get to the ball before any other player did. Instead of falling on the ball to preserve lead, he picked it up and frantically attempted to throw a pass. Instead of going forward, the ball slipped from Yepremian's hands and went straight up in the air. Yepremian then attempted to bat the ball out of bounds but instead batted it back up in the air, and it went right into the arms of his former Lions teammate, Redskins cornerback Mike Bass, who returned it for a touchdown. The Dolphins managed to hold on to win to complete their undefeated 1972 season. Yepremian later joked to reporters after the game, "This is the first time the goat of the game is in the winners' locker room." The play was captured with multiple angles by NFL Films and became a mainstay in blooper reels.

In the 1973 Pro Bowl, Yepremian kicked five field goals to lead the AFC to a win, and was voted Most Valuable Player in that game.

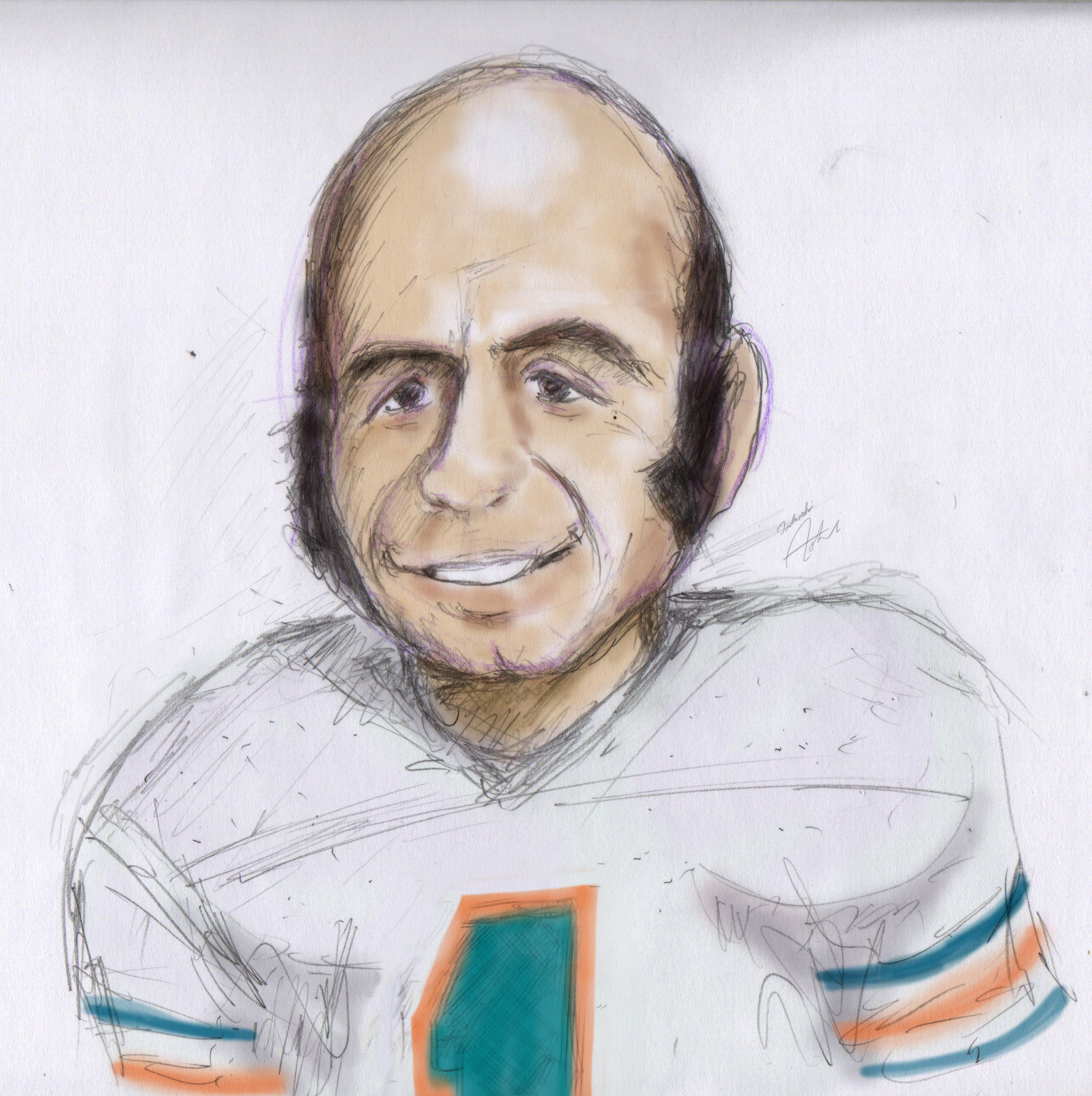
A caricature depicting Yepremian

Yepremian would continue with the Dolphins until 1978, winning Super Bowl VIII with the team and leading the league in field goal accuracy in 1975 and 1978. He was elected to another Pro Bowl in 1978.

Yepremian went to the New Orleans Saints for the 1979 season, signed after their 1979 first round draft choice, Russell Erxleben, suffered a season-ending injury prior to the Saints' week two game with the Green Bay Packers. In 14 games, he made 12 of 16 attempts, with his longest being from 44 yards.

He spent his final two years with the Tampa Bay Buccaneers. He made 16 of 23 in 1980, his lowest field goal rate since making only 45% in 1977. For 1981, he went 2-for-4 to end his career as he was replaced by Bill Capece.

Over his career, Yepremian was successful on 210 of 313 field goals and 444 of 464 extra points for a total of 1,074 points. Yepremian and kick returner Rick Upchurch are the only first-team members of the 1970s NFL All-Decade team to not be elected to the Pro Football Hall of Fame.

== Accolades ==
- Voted "Kicker of the Decade" (1970s) by the Pro Football Hall of Fame Committee
- Named to Sports Illustrated's “Dr. Z's All Decade 1970s Team"
- Two Pro Bowl appearances
- Pro Bowl MVP (1973)
- Two First-team All-Pro honors
- Led NFL in total scoring in the 1970s decade with 905 points
- Elected to the Florida Sports Hall of Fame in 1982
- Nominated for the Pro Football Hall of Fame
- Leading scorer of the Miami Dolphins Undefeated 1972 17–0 Super Bowl VII team and 1973 Super Bowl VIII team
- Ended the longest game in pro football history- 1971 Miami Dolphins vs Kansas City Chiefs AFC Divisional Playoff Game
- Inducted into the Florida Sports Hall of Fame, 1982
- Named one of the Miami Dolphins all-time 40 greatest players as part of the Dolphins' 40th Anniversary, 2005
- Longest NFL career (14 seasons) for any player who did not play football in college
- Inducted into the American Football Association's Semi Pro Football Hall of Fame in 1988
- Named one of the Miami Dolphins all-time 50 greatest players as part of the Dolphins' 50th Anniversary, 2015

== Personal life ==
Yepremian was a motivational speaker and was the Founder/CEO of the Garo Yepremian Foundation for Brain Tumor Research.Reebok featured Yepremian and his teammates from the 1972 Dolphins team in a commercial which aired during Super Bowl XLII. He guest starred in an episode of The Odd Couple in 1974 called "The Rain in Spain Falls Mainly In Vain". He appeared in the movie Paper Lion as himself. He owned his own neck tie company.

== Death ==
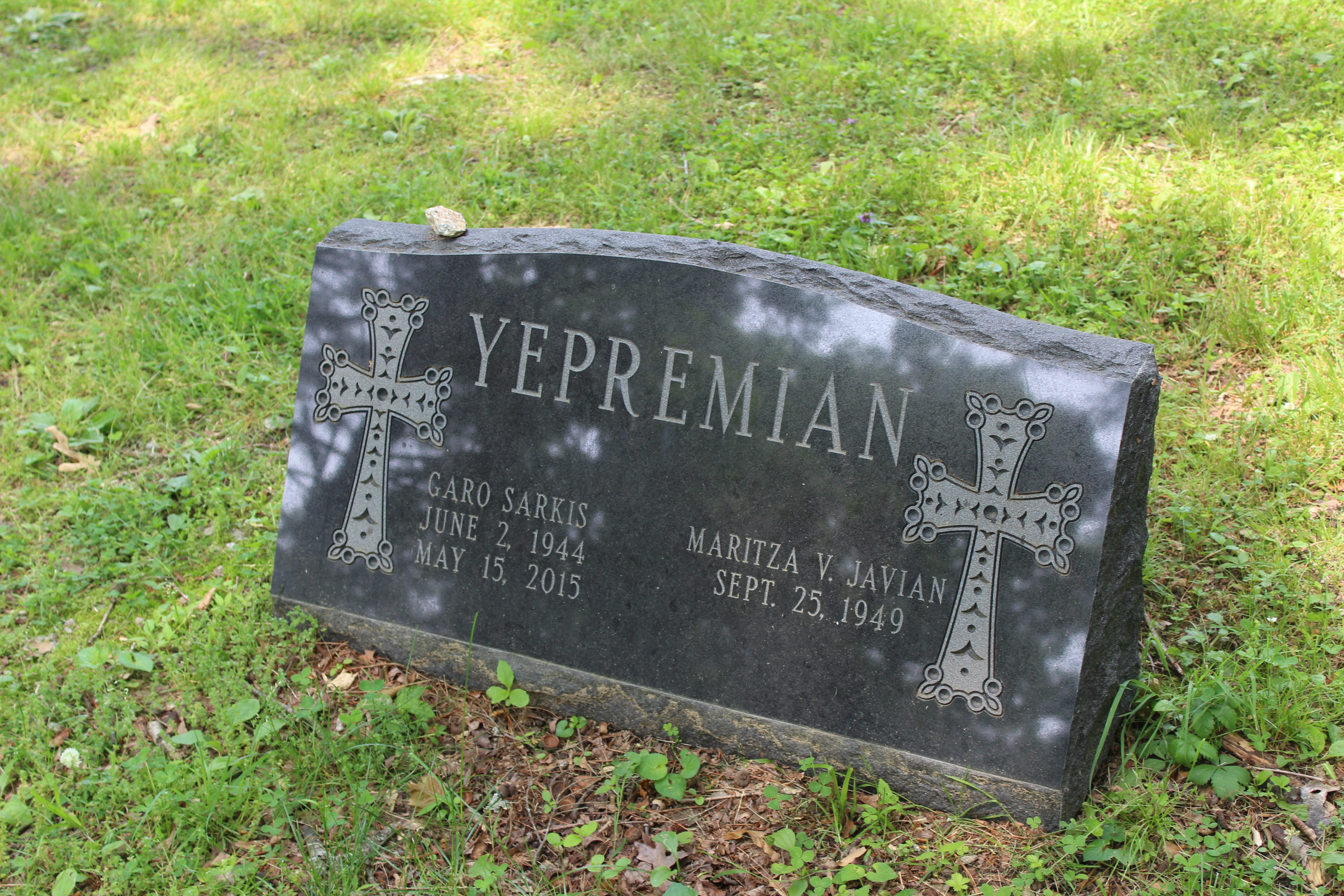
Yepremian's grave in Oaklands Cemetery

Yepremian died on the morning of 15 May 2015, from high grade neuroendocrine cancer at the age of 70. He is interred at the Oaklands Cemetery in West Chester, Pennsylvania.
