= Jeff Van Note =

American football player (1946–2026)

No. 57, 52
- Positions: Center, Guard, Linebacker

Personal information
- Born: February 7, 1946; South Orange, New Jersey, U.S.
- Died: October 2, 2026 (aged 80)
- Listed height: 6 ft 2 in (1.88 m)
- Listed weight: 247 lb (112 kg)

Career information
- High school: St. Joseph Prep (Bardstown, Kentucky)
- College: Kentucky (1965–1968)
- NFL draft: 1969: 11th round, 262nd overall pick

Career history
- Alabama Hawks (1969); Atlanta Falcons (1969–1986)

Awards and highlights
- 2× Second-team All-Pro (1979, 1982); 6× Pro Bowl (1974, 1975, 1979–1982); Atlanta Falcons Ring of Honor; Second-team All-SEC (1966)

Career NFL statistics
- Games played: 246
- Games started: 226
- Fumble recoveries: 4
- Stats at Pro Football Reference

Jeffrey Aloysius Van Note (February 7, 1946 – October 2, 2026) was an American professional football player who was a center for the Atlanta Falcons of the National Football League (NFL) during the 1960s, 1970s and 1980s. He played college football for the Kentucky Wildcats. The Falcons selected him in the 11th round of the 1969 NFL draft.

== Early life and college career ==
Van Note was born on February 7, 1946. He played at the University of Kentucky, where he was a running back and defensive end for the Kentucky Wildcats football team from 1966 to 1968.

== Professional career ==
Van Note was drafted as a linebacker by the Atlanta Falcons in the 11th round with the 269th overall pick of the 1969 NFL draft. During the 1969 season, he played minor league football with the Alabama (Huntsville) Hawks of the Continental Football League.

He was moved to center by Falcons head coach Norm Van Brocklin. Even with modest draft status and a lack of experience at center, Van Note established himself as one of the finest centers in the NFL, making six Pro Bowls. His 18-year tenure with one team is the ninth longest in NFL history. He played in 246 games with the Falcons, starting 226, second in team history to Mike Kenn (251). Van Note missed only four games in his NFL career.

In his final home game at Atlanta–Fulton County Stadium on December 14, 1986, the Falcons honored Van Note and presented him a 57 Chevy. He was voted by fans as the franchise's favorite player during the Falcons' 25th Anniversary season in 1991, and was inducted into the Georgia Sports Hall of Fame in 1999.

== Broadcasting career ==
After retiring from professional football, Van Note served as color commentator on the Atlanta Falcons and Kentucky Wildcats football broadcasts throughout the 1990s. Throughout this period, he would also frequently be heard on Atlanta airwaves as a sports-talk radio host.

Van Note spent time alongside Joe McConnell as the color commentator for the Tennessee Oilers in 1997.

He gave up his commentator positions with both teams following the 2003 season, but was called back into the booth when Georgia Tech football analyst Kim King was unable to call games and later died in the fall of 2004.

Though no longer occupying the Falcons' play-by-play booth, he continued to appear weekly on the Falcons' radio broadcasts, hosting a studio pre-game show and taking calls following the game.

== Death ==
Van Note died October 2, 2026, at the age of 80.

== Honors ==
- 4 time All-NFC (UPI) – 1975, 1980–1982
- 6 time Pro-Bowler – 1974–1975, 1979–1982
- 2 time 2nd Team All-Pro (AP) – 1979, 1982
- Induction into the American Football Association's Semi Pro Football Hall of Fame – 1984
- Participant in the collegiate Blue-Gray All-Star game
- Falcons Ring of Honor – 2006
- Harris Poll Voter – 2011
