= Art Strahan =

American football player (born 1943)

Arthur Ray Strahan
Profile
- Positions: Defensive end, defensive tackle

Personal information
- Born: July 17, 1943 (age 83); Newton, Texas, U.S.
- Listed height: 6 ft 5 in (1.96 m)
- Listed weight: 250 lb (113 kg)

Career information
- High school: Booker T. Washington (Newton)
- College: Texas Southern

Career history
- Houston Oilers (1965); Orlando Panthers (1966–1967, 1969); Dallas Cowboys (1968)*; Atlanta Falcons (1968); Alabama Hawks (1968); Los Angeles Rams (1970)*
- * Offseason or practice squad member only

Awards and highlights
- COFL Championship Game (1966); COFL Championship Game (1967)
- Stats at Pro Football Reference

Art Strahan (born July 17, 1943) is an American former professional football player who played defensive end and defensive tackle in the National Football League (NFL). He played college football for the Texas Southern Tigers. He played professionally for the Houston Oilers, Atlanta Falcons, Orlando Panthers, and Alabama Hawks.

== Early life ==
Arthur Ray Strahan was born on July 17, 1943, in Newton, Texas. Strahan grew up in Houston, Texas.

Strahan attended Booker T. Washington High School in Newton. He was the co-captain of his high school football team.

== College career ==
Strahan played as a defensive end and offensive lineman for four years at Texas Southern University. He made all-conference teams his last two seasons.

== Professional career ==
Strahan played with the Houston Oilers of the American Football League in 1965. He then played for the Orlando Panthers of the Continental Football League in 1966 and 1967, their first two seasons in Orlando.

The Panthers then sold Strahan's contract to the Dallas Cowboys on March 13, 1968. Strahan was cut by the Cowboys and picked up off the waiver wire by the Atlanta Falcons on August 28, 1968. The Falcons released Strahan on September 3, 1968, and sent him to play for the Continental Football League's Alabama Hawks. On November 16, 1968, Strahan was added back to the active roster of the Falcons.

Strahan was cut by the Falcons in September 1969, and returned to the Orlando Panthers for the 1969 season.

Strahan was signed by the Los Angeles Rams on May 16, 1970. He was subsequently released on September 4, 1970. He played 2 games with the Toronto Argonauts of the CFL in 1970.

== Personal life ==
Strahan married Delores Jean and together they had two sons, Andre and Derrick, and one daughter.

He is the uncle of Michael Strahan. Michael Strahan would follow his uncle in attending the Texas Southern University and becoming a defensive end in the NFL.
