= Alvin Coleman =

American football player (born 1944)

- Coleman, 1970

No. 44, 37, 31, 23, 8
- Positions: Cornerback, safety

Personal information
- Born: December 27, 1944 (age 81); Gulfport, Mississippi, U.S.
- Listed height: 6 ft 1 in (1.85 m)
- Listed weight: 183 lb (83 kg)

Career information
- High school: Jim Hill (Jackson, Mississippi)
- College: Jackson State; Tennessee A&I
- NFL draft: 1967: 4th round, 87th overall pick

Career history
- Minnesota Vikings (1967); Des Moines Warriors (1967); Charleston Rockets (1968); Cincinnati Bengals (1969-1971); Philadelphia Eagles (1972–1973)

Career NFL/AFL statistics
- Interceptions: 1
- Fumble recoveries: 3
- Sacks: 1.0
- Stats at Pro Football Reference

Alvin M. "App" Coleman (born December 27, 1944) is an American former professional football player who was a defensive back in the National Football League (NFL) for the Minnesota Vikings (1967), Cincinnati Bengals (1969–1971), and Philadelphia Eagles (1972–1973). He appeared in 57 NFL games, 19 of them as a starter. He played college football for the Jackson State Tigers and the Tennessee A&I Tigers.

== Early life ==
Coleman was born in 1944 in Gulfport, Mississippi. He attended Jim Hill High School in Jackson, Mississippi. He played college football for the Jackson State and Tennessee State. His father Alvin C. Coleman was a football coach at both Jackson State and Tennessee A&I.

== Professional football ==
He was selected by the Minnesota Vikings in the fourth round (87th overall pick) of the 1967 NFL/AFL draft. He appeared in only two games for the Vikings and spent the next two seasons in the minor leagues with the Des Moines Warriors and Charleston Rockets. In 1969, he signed with the Cincinnati Bengals and appeared in 29 games for the club, including 19 starts, from 1969 to 1971. He concluded his career playing for the Philadelphia Eagles, appearing in 26 games during the 1972 and 1973 seasons.
