= Jesse Vail =

American football coach (1928-2003)

Biographical details
- Born: February 21, 1928; Evanston, Illinois, U.S.
- Died: August 7, 2003 (aged 75); Beaver Dam, Wisconsin, U.S.
- Education: DePauw (BA); North Dakota State (MS)

Coaching career (HC unless noted)
- 1950–1952: Ishpeming HS (MI)
- 1953: Battle Creek Central HS (MI) (assistant)
- 1954–1955: North Dakota State (assistant)
- 1956–1963: North Central (IL)
- 1964: Morton East HS (IL) (assistant)
- 1965: Joliet Explorers
- 1966: Culver–Stockton
- 1967: Joliet Chargers
- 1968–1969: Crete-Monee HS (IL)
- 1970: Joliet Chargers
- 1972: Lake County Rifles
- 1977: Stateville Correctional Center

Head coaching record
- Overall: 41–37–2 (college)

Accomplishments and honors

Championships
- 1 CCI (1960)

Jesse Aaron Vail II (February 21, 1928 – August 7, 2003) was an American football coach. He served as the head football coach at North Central College in Naperville, Illinois from 1956 to 1963 and at Culver–Stockton College in Canton, Missouri in 1966, compiling a career college football coaching record of 41–37–2.

He also served as a football coach in a number of different capacities, including as the head coach of the Joliet Explorers of the Professional Football League of America in 1965 and 1967 and at Stateville Correctional Center in 1977. He was also head coach for the Joliet Chargers when they played in the Midwest Professional Football League in 1970.

== Head coaching record ==
=== College ===
Year	Team	Overall	Conference	Standing	Bowl/playoffs
North Central Cardinals (College Conference of Illinois) (1956–1963)
1956	North Central	2–6	1–6	T–6th	
1957	North Central	7–2	5–2	3rd	
1958	North Central	6–3	5–2	T–2nd	
1959	North Central	4–3–2	3–2–2	5th	
1960	North Central	7–2	4–1	T–1st	
1961	North Central	5–4	3–3	4th	
1962	North Central	4–5	3–4	6th	
1963	North Central	3–6	2–4	6th	
North Central:		38–31–2	26–24–2		
Culver–Stockton Wildcats (Missouri College Athletic Union) (1966)
1966	Culver–Stockton	3–6	1–2	5th	
Culver–Stockton:		3–6	1–2		
Total:		41–37–2			
National championship Conference title Conference division title or championship game berth
