= Joliet Memorial Stadium =

Multipurpose stadium in Joliet, Illinois

Coordinates: 41.521913°N 88.155842°W

Joliet Memorial Stadium is a 10,000 seat multipurpose stadium located in Joliet, Illinois. It is used mostly for American football and soccer matches, and also sometimes for athletics. It was built in the early 1950s, opened in 1951 and is dedicated to Joliet residents who fought in World Wars I and II as well as the Korean War.

In 1946, the Joliet Junior Chamber of Commerce chose a board to start building a stadium. Andrew B. Barber was named Chairman and he had a four person committee. The five presented their idea to the Joliet Park District officials. The officials wanted proof that the residents of the district would approve of the building of the stadium.

In one month's time, the officials gained petitions with the signatures of 22,000 residents of the Joliet park district. After seeing the signatures, park officials allowed the building of the stadium to begin. The stadium was built in 1951 dedicated to the Joliet residents who served in World War I, World War II, and the Korean conflict. The dedication ceremony was held on September 14, 1951. The stadium was originally used to hold sporting events for schools in the Joliet Area.

Upon opening in 1951, Joliet Catholic High School and Joliet Township High School became tenants as their schools’ football teams began playing their home games at the stadium. The first football game was played in the stadium was on September 14, 1951 between Joliet Catholic High School and Rock Island Alleman High School.

In 1952, the track around the football field was opened for racing. The track was a quarter mile, which is a good size for midget race cars. Originally the track was a cinder track because of low cost and easy to repair. The cinder track did not last long, because drivers were getting hit in the face with pieces. A year later a layer of clay was added over the cinder track, which was a temporary fix as the cars would peel the clay off the track.

Today, it is the home of the University of St. Francis Saints team, and the Joliet Catholic Academy Hilltoppers & Angels teams.

It is the former home of the Joliet Junior College Wolves football team after the school cancelled the program in 2011, Joliet Township High School (becoming JT Central in 1964) and the Joliet Buccaneers of the MidStates Football League after they moved to Naperville, Illinois. The stadium was home to The Joliet Explorers from 1964 to 1966 and Joliet Chargers in 1967, playing in the Professional Football League of America. It was also the home of the National Christian College Athletic Association National Championship for Outdoor Track and Field from 2011-2013.

It is used for other events, including Independence Day fireworks as well as summer festivals.

For many years after it opened when the track surrounding the football field was made of cinders, the stadium also doubled as the Joliet Speedway where it mainly hosted Stock car and Midget racing. The Stadium was the home of the United Auto Racing Association (UARA) and among the regular drivers at the speedway were midget racers from neighbour towns including Streator native Bob Tattersall (who would later go on to win the 1969 USAC National Midget Championship) and "Wild" Willie Wildhaber from Lexington.. The Stadium would run speedway from its opening until 2009. During the 1960s the cinders track was replaced with asphalt.

In May 2009, renovations on the aging stadium began with the installation of a new, state-of-the-art LED video scoreboard to replace the old, screenless one. By the end of the renovations, planned to be sometime before the 2010 college football season, artificial turf will be installed, along with a new track surface to surround the field.
