= Las Vegas Cowboys =

American football team

- Founded: 1965
- Folded: 1970
- League: Professional Football League of America; Continental Football League
- Based in: Las Vegas, Nevada
- Arena: Cashman Field
- Colors
- Championships: 0

The Las Vegas Cowboys were a professional American football team based in Las Vegas, Nevada. Their roots can be traced to the independent Quad City Raiders, who joined the new Professional Football League of America as the Rock Island Raiders in 1965. The Raiders remained in the PFLA until its merger with the Continental Football League in 1968. After losing their first two regular-season contests in 1968 (and drawing only 1,200 fans for a game in Davenport, Iowa against the Chicago Owls), the Raiders were set to play the Indianapolis Capitols in Indiana. Instead, Indianapolis businessman Thomas Redmond swiftly purchased the club and announced the team would be known as the Las Vegas Cowboys (who lost to the Caps, 41–0 on September 14.) (League records consider the Raiders and Cowboys to be separate clubs.)

At the time, there was already a Las Vegas Cowboys franchise in the minor Western Football League, with Las Vegas holding a 1–1 record in that circuit; Redmond apparently merged the two franchises, forfeited the Cowboys' remaining games in the WFL, and played a Continental League schedule for the rest of 1968. Featuring only five players from the old Quad Cities team, the Cowboys finished the 1968 season with a 1–11 record—which was still an improvement from Quad Cities' 0–12 disaster of the previous year.

In 1969, the final season of the CoFL, Las Vegas improved drastically, both at the gate (drawing 5,068 fans per game to Cashman Field, about double the 1968 figures) and on the field, winning the Pacific Division with an 8–4 record. After routing the Sacramento Capitols, 31–0, in the Pacific Division playoffs, the Cowboys were eliminated and in the second round by the eventual champion San Antonio Toros. It would be the Cowboys' last game: after the 1969 season the franchise was again purchased, and plans for a move to Memphis, Tennessee were announced, with the team planning to join the Trans-American Football League after the CoFL broke up. The move never completed and the Cowboys ceased operations.

== Season-by-season ==
	Year	League	W	L	T	Finish	Coach
Rock Island Raiders	1965	Professional Football League of America	1	9	0	6th	Paul Suverkrup
Quad Cities Raiders	1966	Professional Football League of America	1	9	0	5th	n/a
Quad Cities Raiders	1967	Professional Football League of America	0	12	0	3rd, Western Division	Jack Morton
Quad Cities Raiders/Las Vegas Cowboys	1968	Continental Football League	1	11	0	6th, Central Division	Bobby Peck/Duane Allen
Las Vegas Cowboys	1969	Continental Football League	8	4	0	1st, Pacific Division	Paul Massey
