= Jerry Shay =

American football player (born 1944)

No. 73, 78, 75, 54
- Position: Defensive tackle

Personal information
- Born: July 10, 1944 (age 82); Gary, Indiana, U.S.
- Listed height: 6 ft 3 in (1.91 m)
- Listed weight: 250 lb (113 kg)

Career information
- High school: Lew Wallace (Gary)
- College: Purdue (1962-1965)
- NFL draft: 1966: 1st round, 7th overall pick
- AFL draft: 1966: 1st round, 4th overall pick

Career history
- Minnesota Vikings (1966–1967); Des Moines Warriors (1967); Atlanta Falcons (1968–1969); New York Giants (1970–1971); Edmonton Eskimos (1972)

Awards and highlights
- First-team All-American (1965); First-team All-Big Ten (1965); Second-team All-Big Ten (1964)

Career NFL statistics
- Fumble recoveries: 2
- Sacks: 13.5
- Stats at Pro Football Reference

Jerome Paul Shay (born July 10, 1944) is an American former professional football player who was a defensive tackle for the Minnesota Vikings, Atlanta Falcons, and New York Giants of the National Football League (NFL). Shay played college football at Purdue University, he was named All-American by the American Football Coaches Association and was the seventh selection overall in the 1966 NFL draft by the Minnesota Vikings.

He was inducted into the Indiana Football Hall of Fame in 1996, and the Purdue University Hall of Fame in 2010.

Shay is currently the assistant director of College Scouting for the New York Giants and has been a member of the team's scouting staff since 1977.
