= Rosey Davis =

American football player (born 1941)

Roosevelt Davis
No. 77
- Position: Defensive end

Personal information
- Born: November 29, 1941 (age 84); Jackson, Mississippi, U.S.
- Listed height: 6 ft 5 in (1.96 m)
- Listed weight: 260 lb (118 kg)

Career information
- High school: Jim Hill (Jackson)
- College: Tennessee State
- NFL draft: 1965: 8th round, 112th overall pick

Career history
- New York Giants (1965–1967)
- Stats at Pro Football Reference

Roosevelt R. Davis (born November 29, 1941) is an American former professional football player who played for three years for the New York Giants of the National Football League (NFL). Davis appeared in a total of 22 career games.
