= Roy Curry =

American football player (born 1939)

No. 25
- Position: Wide receiver

Personal information
- Born: November 9, 1939 (age 86)
- Listed height: 6 ft 1 in (1.85 m)
- Listed weight: 185 lb (84 kg)

Career information
- College: Jackson State
- NFL draft: 1963: 12th round, 164th overall pick

Career history
- Pittsburgh Steelers (1963); Joliet Chargers (1964)

Awards and highlights
- Third-team Little All-American (1961)

Career NFL statistics
- Receptions: 1
- Receiving yards: 31
- Touchdowns: 1
- Stats at Pro Football Reference

Roy Curry (born November 9, 1939) is an American former professional football player who played in six games for the 1963 Pittsburgh Steelers of the National Football League (NFL). He played college football at Jackson State. He was also a member of the Joliet Chargers of the United Football League in 1964.
