= Walt Corey =

American football player and coach (1938–2022)

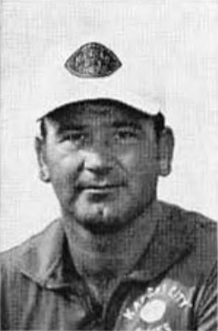
- Corey, c. 1974

No. 56
- Position: Linebacker

Personal information
- Born: May 9, 1938; Latrobe, Pennsylvania
- Died: October 23, 2022 (aged 84); Pleasant Hill, Missouri

Career information
- High school: Derry Area (PA)
- College: Miami (FL)
- NFL draft: 1960: undrafted

Career history

Playing
- Dallas Texans/Kansas City Chiefs (1960–1966)

Coaching
- Omaha Mustangs (1967) Head coach; Utah State (1967–1969) Defensive backs; Miami (FL) (1970) Defensive coordinator; Miami (FL) (1971) Running backs; Kansas City Chiefs (1972–1974) Linebackers; Cleveland Browns (1975–1977) Linebackers and strength; Kansas City Chiefs (1978–1980) Defensive line; Kansas City Chiefs (1981–1982) Defensive backs; Kansas City Chiefs (1983–1985) Defensive line; Kansas City Chiefs (1986) Defensive coordinator/linebackers; Buffalo Bills (1987–1994) Defensive coordinator/linebackers; New Orleans Saints (1997–1999) Defensive line; Memphis Maniax (2000) Defensive coordinator/linebackers

Awards and highlights
- 2× AFL champion (1962, 1966); AFL All-Star (1963)

Career NFL statistics
- Games played: 69
- Interceptions: 4
- Stats at Pro Football Reference
- Coaching profile at Pro Football Reference

Walter Martin Corey (May 9, 1938 – October 23, 2022) was an American professional football player and coach. He played as a linebacker for seven seasons in the American Football League (AFL) before coaching in the National Football League (NFL) for 28 seasons.

Corey played college football for the University of Miami, and then played for the Dallas Texans / Kansas City Chiefs of the AFL from 1960 to 1966. He was an AFL All-Star in 1963 and a member of the AFL champions in 1962 and 1966. Corey then served as head coach of the Omaha Mustangs, a defensive coach at the collegiate level for the University of Miami and Utah State University, for the Chiefs, Cleveland Browns, Buffalo Bills, and New Orleans Saints of the NFL, as well as the Memphis Maniax of the XFL.

== Early life ==
Corey, the youngest of 16 children, was born in Latrobe, Pennsylvania, on May 9, 1938. He attended Derry Township High School in nearby Cooperstown. He then studied at the University of Miami, where he played linebacker for the Miami Hurricanes. Undrafted in the 1960 NFL draft, Corey signed as a rookie free agent with the Dallas Texans of the American Football League (AFL).

== Playing career ==
Corey signed with the Dallas Texans (now Kansas City Chiefs) as undrafted free agent. With the team, he was an AFL All-Star in 1963. At the end of the 1966 season, the Chiefs appeared in the first Super Bowl; Corey announced his retirement after the season to begin a coaching career.

== Coaching career ==
Corey was hired as the head coach with the Omaha Mustangs of the Professional Football League of America. Before the 1967 season, he was hired to the defensive coaching staff for Utah State University in Logan. In 1968, he represented Utah State as a defensive backs coach at the North–South Shrine Game. Corey was hired to be the Miami Hurricanes' defensive coordinator in 1970, and to coach the offensive backfield in 1971.

In 1971, the Kansas City Chiefs hired Corey as a defensive coach. After the 1974 season, the Cleveland Browns hired Corey as their linebacker and strength coach. After three seasons with Cleveland, Corey returned to the Chiefs as their linebacker coach for the 1978 season. After coaching Kansas City's defensive line for two years, he became their defensive backs coach. In 1983, new Chiefs head coach John Mackovic named Corey his first hire for his coaching staff, assigning him to coach the defensive line. In 1986, Mackovic promoted Corey to defensive coordinator.

Corey followed former Chiefs head coach Marv Levy to the Buffalo Bills in 1987. He coached there until the 1994 season, when the Bills finished a disappointing 7–9, and Corey was fired. Corey was Buffalo's defensive coordinator for Buffalo's four consecutive AFC Championship teams from 1990 to 1993. He was also the defensive line coach for the New Orleans Saints under head coach Mike Ditka, from 1997 to 1999. He was the defensive coordinator and linebackers coach of the Memphis Maniax of the XFL in 2001, its only season.

== Personal life ==
Corey and his wife, Jane, had two children. Corey died on October 23, 2022, at age 84.

== See also ==
- List of American Football League players
