= Tri-City Apollos =

American football team

- Founded: 1968
- Folded: 1970
- League: Continental Football League
- Based in: Midland, Michigan; Detroit
- Arena: Midland Stadium; University of Detroit Stadium
- Championships: 0

The Tri-City Apollos were a professional American football team based in Midland, Michigan.

== Early years ==
An earlier team known as the Macomb Arrows began in 1962, playing in Pontiac, Michigan in the semi-pro Midwest Football League. After winning four MFL championships, the club changed their name to the Pontiac Arrows, then moved to Fort Wayne, Indiana to become the Fort Wayne Tigers in 1968. (The Tigers dropped all twelve of their games in 1968 and disappeared at season's end.)

With the Macomb County market open, a brand-new franchise emerged: the Michigan Arrows, who joined the Continental Football League. Rather than play in or near Pontiac, however, the new Arrows moved their home games to the University of Detroit Stadium to take on the NFL's Detroit Lions head-on.

== Continental Football League ==
Detroit Free Press ad

Unfortunately, the Arrows did not have the organization nor the personnel to compete with the Lions (despite the fact that the NFL club was an awful 4-8-2, winning only one game in Detroit all year). The quarterback position was rotated among several players, including local product Ron Bishop, who played at U-D in the early sixties before the school dropped football. (The Arrows did have one player of note: ex-Lions kicker Garo Yepremian, who kicked six of ten field goal attempts.)

Only 3,415 fans showed up for the Arrows' first game on September 7, 1968, at U of D Stadium, an overtime loss to Omaha; the day would turn tragic when Mustangs' linebacker Glen Hepburn was knocked unconscious and suffered a ruptured blood vessel in his brain. The 30-year-old Hepburn would pass away four days later at Martin Place Hospital in Madison Heights, Michigan, marking the only fatality in CoFL history. On the field, Michigan would wind up losing all five of their home games, drawing just 4,554 per contest. The final home game of the season was shifted to Midland, Michigan: a 62-6 pounding at the hands of Ohio Valley in front of 3,450, dropping Michigan's final record to 1-11.

In January 1969, the Arrows announced a permanent move to Midland, as well as a name change to the Tri-City Apollos. The Apollos failed to achieve liftoff on the field or at the gate, however. Led by former Chicago Bears backup QB Larry Rakestraw, Tri-City lost their first eight games en route to a 2-10 record in front of tiny crowds: twice, the club drew less than 1,000 people for games at the Midland High School stadium. When the CoFL ceased operations in 1970, so did the Apollos. Its player contracts were transferred to the Atlantic Coast Football League and allocated in a dispersal draft in May 1970 along with other teams that did not survive the CoFL's dissolution.

== 2026 revival ==
In 2026, the revival of the Continental Football League announced that a revived Arrows would be among its inaugural teams, relaunching the franchise in response to the loss of the UFL's Michigan Panthers. Panthers general manager Steve Kazor carried over to the revived Arrows, serving as head coach in addition to his general manager duties.

== Season-by-season ==
	Year	League	W	L	T	Finish	Coach
Michigan Arrows	1968	Continental Football League	1	11	0	6th, Atlantic Division	Lisle Wells
Tri-City Apollos	1969	Continental Football League	2	10	0	5th, Atlantic Division	Chuck Cherundolo
