= American Academy of Larnaca =

Private school in Larcana, Cyprus

The American Academy, Larnaca

Location
- Larnaca, Cyprus
- 34.917152°N 33.628139°E

Information
- Type: Private
- Motto: To Grow and to Serve
- Established: 1908
- Grades: K-13
- Colours: Maroon, Navy Blue
- Website: academy.ac.cy

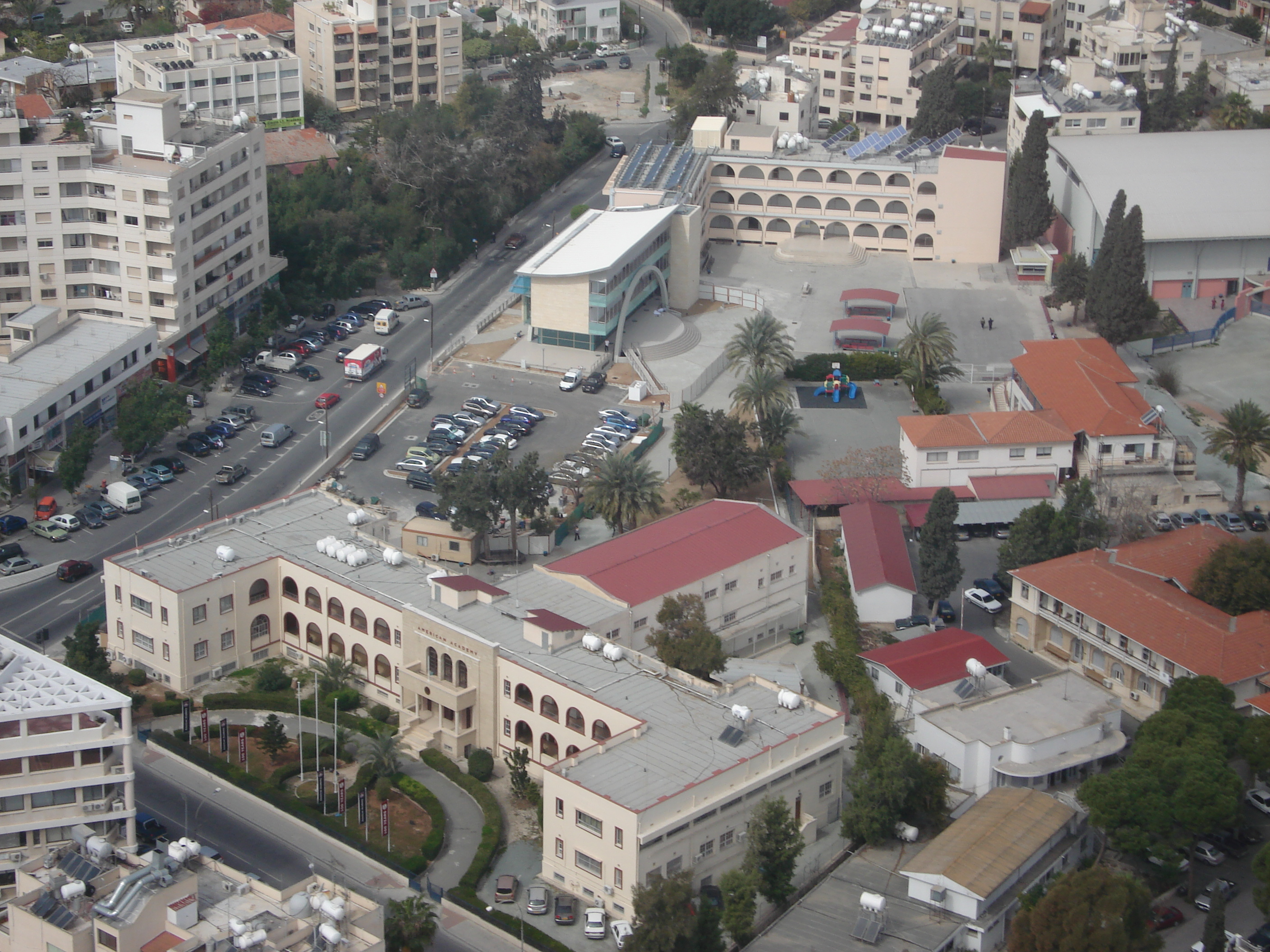
Aerial view of the school grounds

The American Academy Larnaca is a non-profit private school in Larnaca, Cyprus, offering education from pre-school to university entrance level. It is a selective, co-educational school registered under the Private Schools’ Law (1971) of the Republic of Cyprus.

The school was founded in 1908. The school motto is "to grow and to serve", an extension of the culture and ethos of the school referred to as "the Academy spirit", which is characterized by a democratic and positive climate, respect for each other, understanding and co-operation between students and staff, as well as student and staff involvement in humanitarian, social, cultural, and other activities for the welfare of the people and the community. The school was always a multi-communal school with student enrollment and faculty from Greek Cypriot, Turkish Cypriot, Maronite, Armenian, and Latin communities along with foreign nationals. The school participates in the Duke of Edinburgh's Award program.

The school celebrated its centenary in 2008 with a new zero-energy building (a first of its kind on the island) and a series of special events.

== History ==
Established in 1908, the American Academy of Larnaca is among the oldest and longest-running schools in Cyprus. The school was established by Rev. McCarroll and Mrs. McCarroll, missionaries of the Reformed Presbyterian Church of North America who were first in charge of an elementary mission school on the island. When the couple was allowed to open a boys' secondary school, they founded the American Academy of Larnaca. The school had 60 enrolled students in a year.

According to the school's official website, "The purpose of the Academy was to provide a Christian-focused education which encompassed not only academic training but also a focus on a Christian way of living. Students graduating from the Academy were taught to be tolerant and respectful, serve the community, and uphold high ideals and morals."

Although the school was intended to be boys’ school, a girls’ department opened in 1916 using the mission chapel. The initial experiment was short-lived, and the girls’ department closed in 1919. It reopened ten years later. The boy's department continued to grow as did the number of buildings on the present site. During the Second World War, the school was temporarily transferred to the village of Pano Lefkara where it was housed between 1941 and 1943.

The present school began to take shape in 1954 with the completion of the Weir Hall. An auditorium was added four years later. The original Memorial Hall was demolished and the New Memorial Hall began to take shape in 1983.

In 1975, the control of the school and its facilities was handed over to the American Academy Alumni Foundation.

== Notable alumni ==
- Marilena Raouna – Director of the Diplomatic Office of the President of Cyprus
- Miltos Michaelas – CEO of Alpha Bank Cyprus
- Garo Yepremian – Former NFL placekicker
