= Milton Frank Stadium =

Multi-purpose stadium in Alabama

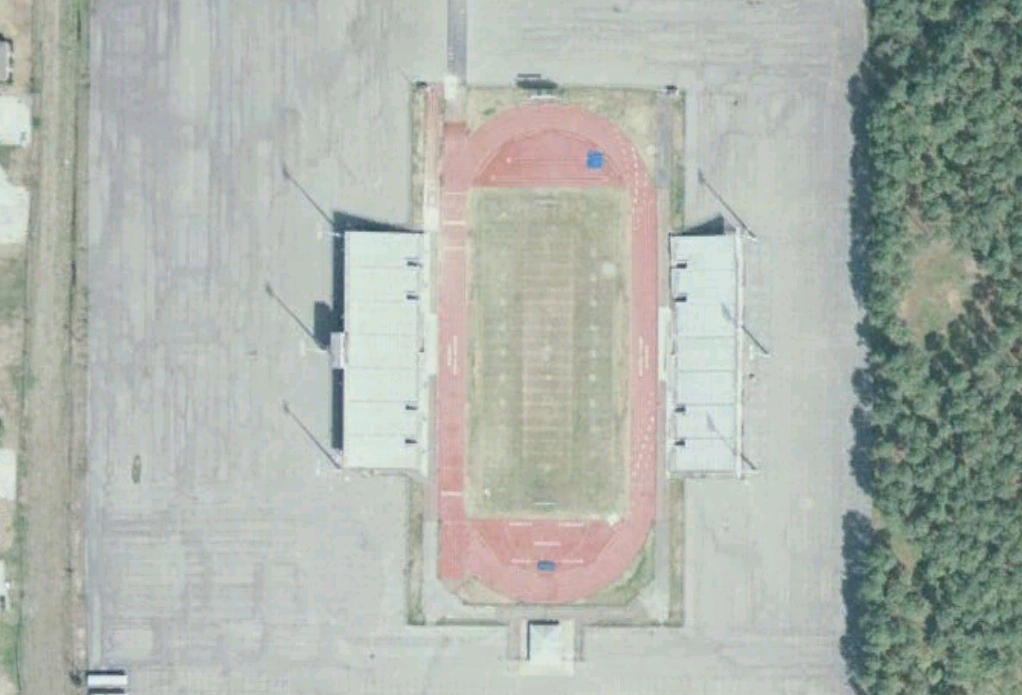
- Interactive map of Milton Frank Stadium
- Former names: Huntsville Stadium
- Location: Huntsville, Alabama
- Coordinates: 34.707°N 86.604°W
- Owner: Huntsville City Schools
- Capacity: 12,000

Construction
- Groundbreaking: 1949
- Opened: 1962

Tenants
- Huntsville City Schools (AHSAA) (1962–present); Alabama A&M Bulldogs (NCAA) (1962–1995); Alabama Hawks (ConFL) (1968–1969); Tennessee Valley Tigers (WSFL) (2009–present)

Milton Frank Stadium is a 12,000-seat multi-purpose stadium in Huntsville, Alabama. It was used for Alabama A&M football games before the creation of Louis Crews Stadium. It is currently used mainly for Huntsville City Schools high school and middle school football and soccer games and track meets. Construction began in 1949 and the stadium was opened in 1962 as Huntsville Stadium. It was soon renamed Milton Frank Stadium in honor of Milton Frank, the long-time football coach and athletic director of Huntsville High School and chairman of Huntsville City School Board of Education. In the 1990s, the grass field was replaced with artificial turf and a new track replaced the original asphalt track.

Milton Frank Stadium was the home of the Alabama Hawks of the Continental Football League during the team's two years of affiliation with that league in 1968–1969. Since 2008, the stadium has been the home field for the Tennessee Valley Tigers, a women's American football team currently in the Women's Spring Football League.

John Stanley Welzyn was the public address announcer during high school games at the stadium from 1964 until retiring in 1996. During his tenure, Welzyn also announced Alabama Hawks pro football and Alabama A&M Bulldogs college football games. Welzyn died in 1999 at the age of 66.

Special Olympics competitions for the Madison County, Alabama, area are held each year at the stadium.

In November 2011, the Huntsville City Schools announced that a contract valued at $1.6 million was signed with Goldmon Matheny Architects to renovate the stadium. Upgrades included new stadium entrances, new fences, new gates, new scoreboards, plus the demolition of the existing restrooms and locker rooms under both grandstands then construction of new locker rooms, restrooms, and concession areas to replace them.
