= Don Branby =

American football player (1928–2010)

No. 74
- Position: End

Personal information
- Born: December 29, 1928; Glenwood, Minnesota, U.S.
- Died: March 8, 2010 (aged 81); Glenwood, Minnesota, U.S.
- Listed height: 6 ft 1 in (1.85 m)
- Listed weight: 198 lb (90 kg)

Career information
- High school: Glenwood (MN)
- College: Colorado Buffaloes
- NFL draft: 1953: 7th round, 80th overall pick

Awards and highlights
- First-team All-American (1952); 2× First-team All-Big Seven (1951, 1952)

Donald Jerome Branby (December 29, 1928 – March 8, 2010) was an American football player. Branby played college football at the end position for the Colorado Buffaloes football team. During the 1952 season, he recovered seven fumbles, had nine takeaways, and reportedly had "at least 20 tackles" against Oklahoma. At the end of the season, he was selected by the Associated Press as a first-team player on its 1952 College Football All-America Teams. He also played baseball and basketball at Colorado. After leaving Colorado, he spent four years in the United States Air Force and later became a football coach, holding positions with the Montana State Bobcats, the British Columbia Lions and the Ottawa Rough Riders. He was inducted into the University of Colorado Athletic Hall of Fame in 2004. He worked at a sporting goods store in Snowmass and Grand Junction, Colorado, for many years. He died in 2010 in Glenwood, Minnesota, where he lived.
