= Alabama Hawks =

Defunct American football team

- Founded: 1963
- League: Southern Football League; North American Football League; Professional Football League of America; Continental Football League
- Team history: Alabama Hawks; 1963–1969
- Based in: Huntsville, Alabama
- Arena: Milton Frank Stadium
- Colors: Columbia Blue and Yellow Gold
- Head coach: Steve Sucic (1968); David N. Sington (1968–1969)

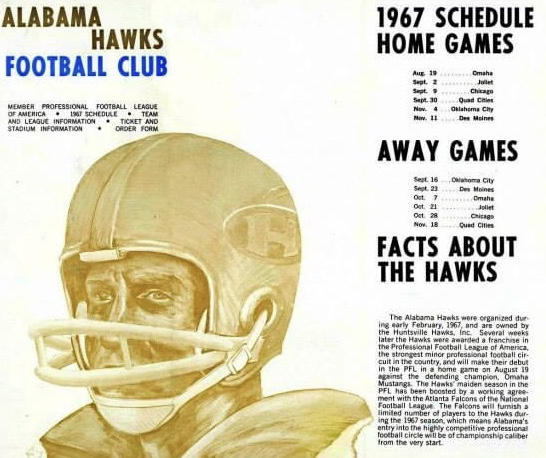
Alabama Hawks brochure, 1967

The Alabama Hawks were a professional American football team based in Huntsville, Alabama. They were members of various minor league football circuits in the 1960s: the Southern Football League (1963–64); the North American Football League (1965–66), the Professional Football League of America (1967), and finally the Continental Football League during the league's last two years (1968–1969). While in the CoFL, the Hawks played in the Eastern Division of the Atlantic Conference. During the 1968 season, the team was also known as the Huntsville Hawks.

In 1967, in the PFLA's last year of operation, the Hawks won the Western Division with a 9–3 record and hosted the league's championship game at Milton Frank Stadium, losing 31–20 to the Joliet Chargers.

The Hawks served as an "unofficial" minor league affiliate of the Atlanta Falcons. On August 2, 1969, the Falcons came to Huntsville to play an exhibition game against the Hawks at Milton Frank Stadium; playing mostly rookies, Atlanta easily beat Alabama, 55–0. The contest marked the only time an NFL squad played a Continental League team. (In 1972, the New York Jets rookies would play the minor league Long Island Chiefs and in 1974, the Houston Oilers rookies would play the minor league San Antonio Toros)

The Hawks sent several notable players on to the NFL including Jeff Van Note, Chip Myers, Glen Condren, and Art Strahan, uncle of Michael Strahan. Hawks running back Billy "Tootie" Hill—who set a record by scoring ten touchdowns in a single game—went on to coach high school football in the area and, later, the semi-pro Rocket City Titans of the Gridiron Developmental Football League.
