= Omaha Mustangs =

Defunct American football team

- League: Independent; Professional Football League of America; Continental Football League; Texas Football League; Midwest Professional Football League
- Based in: Omaha, Nebraska
- Arena: Rosenblatt Stadium
- Championships: 1 (1966)

The Omaha Mustangs were a professional American football team based in Omaha, Nebraska. They began as an independent, semi-pro team in the early 1960s before joining the Professional Football League of America, a newly formed league based on remnants of the United Football League, in 1965. The Mustangs won the PFLA championship in their second season by defeating the Des Moines Warriors in a playoff game in front of 4,530 spectators. The Mustangs were affiliated with the Kansas City Chiefs for the 1967 season (the Chiefs would later be affiliated with the Kansas City Steers).

Omaha moved to the Continental Football League for the 1968 season and finished 7–5 in the Central Division. In September 1968, Glen Hepburn, a two-way player for the Mustangs, died from injuries sustained in a game.

On December 15, 1969, the COFL revoked Omaha's franchise for failure to meet the league's financial obligations. The league itself quietly disbanded after the 1969 season and the Mustangs joined the Trans-American Football League for the 1970 season.

In February 1971 the Mustangs announced they would be joining the Midwest Professional Football League. The Mustangs did not operate for the 1973 season. They were revived as a fully independent team in 1974.

== Season-by-season ==
	Year	League	W	L	T	Finish	Coach
Omaha Mustangs	1965	Professional Football League of America	7	3	0	3rd, PFLA	Bernie Berigan
Omaha Mustangs	1966	Professional Football League of America	8	2	0	1st, PFLA	Bernie Berigan
Omaha Mustangs	1967	Professional Football League of America	8	4	0	2nd, Eastern Division	Bernie Berigan, Walt Corey
Omaha Mustangs	1968	Continental Football League	7	5	0	2nd, Central Division	Bernie Berigan
Omaha Mustangs	1969	Continental Football League	6	6	0	2nd, Central Division	Don Fleming
Omaha Mustangs	1970	Texas Football League	5	4	0	4th, TFL	Don Fleming
