= Chicago Owls =

Professional American football team

- Founded: 1969
- League: Professional Football League of America (1967); Continental Football League (1968–1969)
- Team history: Chicago Owls (1967–1969)
- Based in: Chicago, Illinois
- Arena: Soldier Field
- Colors: Navy, Brown and White
- Owner: Marty O'Connor
- Head coach: Don Branby; Bob Webb
- Championships: none

The Chicago Owls were a professional American football team based in Chicago, Illinois. They were members of the Professional Football League of America (PFLA) in 1967 and, after the leagues merged, the Continental Football League (COFL) during the league's last two years (1968–1969). The club was owned by Marty O'Connor and initially coached by Don Branby.

== 1967 season ==
The Owls inaugural season in PFLA was not a successful one: they finished last in the league's Eastern Division with a 3–9 mark. Nor did they play in Chicago; the Owls' home games were in suburban Niles, Illinois, at Notre Dame College Prep School, where they played in front of a few thousand fans per contest. (Future baseball star Greg Luzinski attended and played football for Notre Dame at the time.) Bob Webb, who grew up in nearby Gary, Indiana, was the Owls' main quarterback; he would remain with the team in 1968.

== 1968 season ==
After spending three seasons with the Montreal Alouettes of the Canadian Football League, former Arlington High School and Northern Illinois University Huskies star George Bork returned to Chicago as the Owls' starting quarterback in 1968. The club raised some eyebrows when they announced they would move into Soldier Field, which had been unused by pro football since the Cardinals moved out in 1959 (the Owls' tenancy on the lakefront preceded the NFL's Bears by three years). Offensive lineman Bob Kuechenberg, younger brother of Bears linebacker Rudy Kuechenberg, began his professional career with the Owls; the younger Kuechenberg would go on to a 14-year career with the Miami Dolphins.

Chicago Owls ticket envelope

After dropping four of their first five games, the Owls fired Branby and replaced him with Webb, who was still the Owls' backup quarterback. Webb led Chicago to a 5–2 record the rest of the year, enough to even up the Owls' record at 6–6, third place in the Central Division. Playing primarily on Saturdays, the club drew only 35,835 fans to cavernous Soldier Field all season, or less than 6,000 a game.

== 1969 season ==
Things did not improve for the Owls in 1969, as their record slipped to 5–7 and continued to draw small crowds: just 21,403 paid their way to their games this season, barely 3,500 a contest and a small fraction of their stadium's capacity. The team was practically invisible amid the crowded Windy City sports scene, with a running gag in the Chicago press that mentions of the Chicago Owls brought a response similar to an owl's hoot: "Who?" The CoFL revoked their franchise on December 15, 1969, for failing to meet the league's financial obligation (this would soon become moot, as the entire CoFL would fold soon after). Despite this setback, the Trans-American Football League announced it would include the Chicago Owls on its schedule for 1970, but the team folded prior to the start of the season.
