= Professional Football League of America =

- Sport: American football
- Founded: 1965
- Folded: 1967
- No. of teams: Varied (5 to 7)
- Countries: United States
- Last champion: Joliet Chargers
- Most titles: Joilet (2)

The Professional Football League of America (PFLA) was an American football minor league that operated in the Midwest region of the United States from 1965 through 1967. With franchises based in the Midwest, the league played three seasons before merging some teams into the Continental Football League.

== History ==
The Professional Football League of America began play in 1965. The Des Moines Warriors, Grand Rapids Blazers, Joliet Explorers, Lincoln Comets, Omaha Mustangs and Rock Island Raiders were charter members of the league. The Professional Football League of America evolved from the disbanded United Football League, and began play in the fall of 1965. The Joliet Explorers swept the Grand Rapids Blazers in a two–game championship series.

In 1966, the Rock Island Raiders franchise moved to neighboring Davenport, Iowa and changed names to become the "Quad City Raiders." The Lincoln Comets franchise did not return to league play. The Omaha Mustangs won the 1966 PFLA championship game, defeating the Des Moines Warriors 27–7 at home with 4,530 in attendance.

In their final season of play, the Pro Football League of America expanded, adding the Alabama Hawks, Chicago Owls and Oklahoma City Plainsmen franchises. The 1967 league played in two divisions. In May 1967, the Joliet franchise became an affiliate of the San Diego Chargers of the American Football League and changed their moniker to become the "Joliet Chargers" for the 1967 season. The 1967 Des Moines Warriors were an affiliate of the Minnesota Vikings. In 1967, the Alabama Hawks won the Western Division with a 9–3 record and hosted the PFLA's championship game at Milton Frank Stadium, losing 31–20 to the Joliet Chargers, who had won the Eastern Division with a 10–2 record.

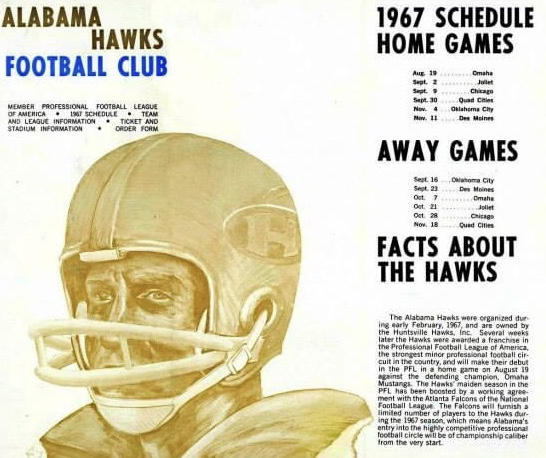
(1967) Alabama Hawks program

The PFLA permanently folded following the 1967 season. In February 1968, the Continental Football League expanded to include some of the Pro Football League of America teams and continued play. The merger allowed the Continental Football League to expand into the midwestern United States. The Des Moines and Joliet Franchises did not join the league.

== Season by season ==
=== 1965 Professional Football League of America ===
W = Wins, L = Losses, T = Ties, PCT= Winning Percentage, PF= Points For, PA = Points Against

y = League Champion

1965 Pro Football League of America
Team	W	L	T	PCT	PF	PA	Stadium	Coach
Joliet Explorers	8	1	1	.889	365	70	Joliet Memorial Stadium	Jesse Vail
Grand Rapids Blazers	8	1	1	.889	293	119	Kimble Stadium	Steve Sucic
Omaha Mustangs	7	3	0	.700	318	162	Johnny Rosenblatt Stadium	Bernie Berigan
Des Moines Warriors	3	7	0	.300	152	298	Sec Taylor Stadium	Gale Gibson
Lincoln Comets	2	8	0	.200	156	310	Seacrest Field	Don Erway
Rock Island Raiders	1	9	0	.100	93	396	Douglas Park	Paul Suverkrup

=== 1966 Professional Football League of America ===
W = Wins, L = Losses, T = Ties, PCT= Winning Percentage, PF= Points For, PA = Points Against

y = League Champion

1966 Pro Football League of America
Team	W	L	T	PCT	PF	PA	Stadium	Coach
Omaha Mustangs	8	2	0	800	312	151	Johnny Rosenblatt Stadium	Bernie Berigan
Des Moines Warriors	8	2	0	.800	224	138	Sec Taylor Stadium	Don Branby
Joliet Explorers	6	4	0	.600	271	126	Joliet Memorial Stadium	Bob Webb
Grand Rapids Shamrocks	1	7	0	.357	54	162	Kimble Stadium	Jack Morton
Quad Cities Raiders	1	9	0	.100	92	376	Memorial Stadium	Frank Abbott

=== 1967 Professional Football League of America ===
W = Wins, L = Losses, T = Ties, PCT= Winning Percentage, PF= Points For, PA = Points Against

y = Division Champion

1967 Pro Football League of America
Eastern Division
Team	W	L	T	PCT	PF	PA	Stadium	Coach
Joliet Chargers	10	2	0	.833	324	140	West Jefferson Stadium	Jesse Vail
Omaha Mustangs	8	4	0	.333	288	289	Johnny Rosenblatt Stadium	Bernie Berigan / Walt Corey
Des Moines Warriors	7	4	1	.636	369	163	Sec Taylor Stadium	Don Branby
Chicago Owls	3	9	0	.250	216	335	Notre Dame High School Stadium	Bob Webb
Western Division
Team	W	L	T	PCT	PF	PA	Stadium	Coach
Alabama Hawks	9	3	0	.750	381	185	Milton Frank Stadium	Marv Matuszak
Oklahoma City Plainsmen	4	7	1	.833	277	282	Taft Stadium	Cliff Speegle
Quad City Raiders	0	12	0	.417	159	610	Memorial Stadium	Jack Morton

== See also ==
- List of leagues of American football
